= 2026 NRL season results =

The 2026 NRL season was the 119th of professional rugby league in Australia and the 29th season run by the National Rugby League.

All times are listed in AEST (UTC+10).

Scores with an asterisk (*) indicate golden point games.

== Regular season ==
=== Round 1 ===
March 1–8

Home	Score	Away	Match information			
Home	Score	Away	Day & time	Venue	Referee	Attendance
Newcastle Knights	28–18	North Queensland Cowboys	Sunday 1 March, 12:15pm	Allegiant Stadium	Ashley Klein	45,719
Canterbury-Bankstown Bulldogs	15–14*	St. George Illawarra Dragons	Sunday 1 March, 2:30pm	Allegiant Stadium	Grant Atkins	45,719
Melbourne Storm	52–4	Parramatta Eels	Thursday 5 March, 7:00 pm	AAMI Park	Todd Smith	18,264
New Zealand Warriors	42–18	Sydney Roosters	Friday 6 March, 5:00 pm	Go Media Stadium	Wyatt Raymond	24,112
Brisbane Broncos	0–26	Penrith Panthers	Friday 6 March, 7:00 pm	Suncorp Stadium	Adam Gee	45,566
Cronulla-Sutherland Sharks	50–10	Gold Coast Titans	Saturday 7 March, 4:30 pm	Ocean Protect Stadium	Ziggy Przeklasa-Adamski	11,548
Manly Warringah Sea Eagles	28–29*	Canberra Raiders	Saturday 7 March, 6:30 pm	4 Pines Park	Liam Kennedy	17,253
Dolphins	30–40	South Sydney Rabbitohs	Sunday 8 March, 3:05 pm	Suncorp Stadium	Peter Gough	20,114
Bye: Wests Tigers
Sources:

- For a third consecutive season, the NRL season commenced with a split round, beginning with a double-header at Allegiant Stadium in Las Vegas, Nevada, as part of NRL's Rugby League Las Vegas venture.

=== Round 2 ===
March 12–15

Home	Score	Away	Match information			
Home	Score	Away	Day & time	Venue	Referee	Attendance
Brisbane Broncos	32–40	Parramatta Eels	Thursday, 7:00 pm	Suncorp Stadium	Wyatt Raymond	39,015
New Zealand Warriors	40–6	Canberra Raiders	Friday, 5:00 pm	Go Media Stadium	Peter Gough	23,067
Sydney Roosters	26–18	South Sydney Rabbitohs	Friday, 7:00 pm	Allianz Stadium	Adam Gee	41,424
Wests Tigers	44–16	North Queensland Cowboys	Saturday, 2:00 pm	Leichhardt Oval	Grant Atkins	17,637
St. George Illawarra Dragons	20–46	Melbourne Storm	Saturday, 4:30 pm	WIN Stadium	Gerard Sutton	11,511
Penrith Panthers	26–6	Cronulla-Sutherland Sharks	Saturday, 6:30 pm	Carrington Park	Ashley Klein	12,000
Manly Warringah Sea Eagles	16–36	Newcastle Knights	Sunday, 3:05 pm	4 Pines Park	Todd Smith	17,107
Dolphins	18–14	Gold Coast Titans	Sunday, 5:15 pm	Suncorp Stadium	Liam Kennedy	16,073
Bye: Canterbury-Bankstown Bulldogs

- The crowd of 41,424 for the Roosters and Rabbitohs match was the biggest crowd ever at Allianz Stadium during a home and away season.
- Alex Johnston scored his 213th try to surpass the all time try scorer Ken Irvine.

=== Round 3 (Multicultural Round) ===
March 19–22

Home	Score	Away	Match information			
Home	Score	Away	Day & time	Venue	Referee	Attendance
Canberra Raiders	10–14	Canterbury-Bankstown Bulldogs	Thursday, 7:00 pm	GIO Stadium	Adam Gee	13,723
Sydney Roosters	4–40	Penrith Panthers	Friday, 5:00 pm	Allianz Stadium	Grant Atkins	22,128
Melbourne Storm	14–18	Brisbane Broncos	Friday, 7:00 pm	AAMI Park	Todd Smith	28,245
Newcastle Knights	12–38	New Zealand Warriors	Saturday, 3:00 pm	McDonald Jones Stadium	Liam Kennedy	21,682
Cronulla-Sutherland Sharks	10–38	Dolphins	Saturday, 4:30 pm	Ocean Protect Stadium	Gerard Sutton	11,096
South Sydney Rabbitohs	20–16	Wests Tigers	Saturday, 6:30 pm	polytec Stadium	Wyatt Raymond	19,940
Parramatta Eels	30–20	St. George Illawarra Dragons	Sunday, 3:05 pm	CommBank Stadium	Ashley Klein	25,573
North Queensland Cowboys	30–16	Gold Coast Titans	Sunday, 5:15 pm	Queensland Country Bank Stadium	Peter Gough	16,999
Bye: Manly Warringah Sea Eagles

- Melbourne recorded their highest regular season game crowd at AAMI Park since round 8, 2014.
- Brisbane won in Melbourne at AAMI Park for the first time since round 25, 2016.

=== Round 4 ===
March 26–29

Home	Score	Away	Match information			
Home	Score	Away	Day & time	Venue	Referee	Attendance
Manly Warringah Sea Eagles	16–33	Sydney Roosters	Thursday, 7:00 pm	4 Pines Park	Wyatt Raymond	16,082
New Zealand Warriors	14–32	Wests Tigers	Friday, 5:00 pm	Go Media Stadium	Adam Gee	24,246
Brisbane Broncos	26–12	Dolphins	Friday, 7:00 pm	Suncorp Stadium	Ashley Klein	45,882
Canterbury-Bankstown Bulldogs	16–24	Newcastle Knights	Saturday, 2:00 pm	Accor Stadium	Peter Gough	20,572
Penrith Panthers	48–20	Parramatta Eels	Saturday, 4:30 pm	CommBank Stadium	Todd Smith	22,813
North Queensland Cowboys	28–24	Melbourne Storm	Saturday, 6:30 pm	Queensland Country Bank Stadium	Gerard Sutton	20,931
Canberra Raiders	22–34	Cronulla-Sutherland Sharks	Sunday, 3:05 pm	GIO Stadium	Grant Atkins	17,457
Gold Coast Titans	22–14	St. George Illawarra Dragons	Sunday, 5:15 pm	Cbus Super Stadium	Liam Kennedy	12,241
Bye: South Sydney Rabbitohs

- Manly Warringah coach Anthony Seibold became the earliest NRL coach sacked since Jason Taylor in 2017, after the Sea Eagles' 0–3 start to the season.
- Thomas Jenkins became the first player to score 10 tries in the opening four rounds since Jack Lindwall in 1947.

=== Round 5 (Easter Round) ===
April 2–6

Home	Score	Away	Match information			
Home	Score	Away	Day & time	Venue	Referee	Attendance
Dolphins	18–52	Manly Warringah Sea Eagles	Thursday, 7:00 pm	Kayo Stadium	Grant Atkins	10,023
South Sydney Rabbitohs	32–24	Canterbury-Bankstown Bulldogs	Friday, 3:05 pm	Accor Stadium	Todd Smith	49,813
Penrith Panthers	50–10	Melbourne Storm	Friday, 7:00 pm	CommBank Stadium	Ashley Klein	20,204
St. George Illawarra Dragons	0–32	North Queensland Cowboys	Saturday, 4:30 pm	St. George Venues Jubilee Stadium	Wyatt Raymond	8,491
Gold Coast Titans	12–26	Brisbane Broncos	Saturday, 6:30 pm	Cbus Super Stadium	Gerard Sutton	26,223
Cronulla-Sutherland Sharks	36–22	New Zealand Warriors	Sunday, 2:00 pm	Ocean Protect Stadium	Ziggy Przeklasa-Adamski	13,112
Newcastle Knights	32–12	Canberra Raiders	Sunday, 4:05 pm	McDonald Jones Stadium	Adam Gee	23,002
Parramatta Eels	20–22*	Wests Tigers	Monday, 4:05 pm	CommBank Stadium	Peter Gough	29,397
Bye: Sydney Roosters

- For the first time since 2003, Melbourne conceded 50 points.
- Penrith won 5 games in a row for the first time since 2022.

=== Round 6 ===
April 9–12

Home	Score	Away	Match information			
Home	Score	Away	Day & time	Venue	Referee	Attendance
Canterbury-Bankstown Bulldogs	32–16	Penrith Panthers	Thursday, 7:50 pm	Accor Stadium	Gerard Sutton	23,984
St. George Illawarra Dragons	18–28	Manly Warringah Sea Eagles	Friday, 6:00 pm	WIN Stadium	Adam Gee	11,381
Brisbane Broncos	31–35	North Queensland Cowboys	Friday, 8:00 pm	Suncorp Stadium	Ashley Klein	45,582
South Sydney Rabbitohs	34–36	Canberra Raiders	Saturday, 3:00 pm	Optus Stadium	Liam Kennedy	33,404
Cronulla-Sutherland Sharks	22–34	Sydney Roosters	Saturday, 5:30 pm	Optus Stadium	Todd Smith	33,404
Melbourne Storm	14–38	New Zealand Warriors	Saturday, 7:30 pm	AAMI Park	Grant Atkins	26,467
Parramatta Eels	10–52	Gold Coast Titans	Sunday, 2:00 pm	CommBank Stadium	Ziggy Przeklasa-Adamski	14,382
Wests Tigers	42–22	Newcastle Knights	Sunday, 4:05 pm	Campbelltown Sports Stadium	Wyatt Raymond	15,221
Bye: Dolphins

- For the first time since 2014, the Warriors won in Melbourne following a 17-match losing streak against the Storm.

=== Round 7 ===
April 16–19

Home	Score	Away	Match information			
Home	Score	Away	Day & time	Venue	Referee	Attendance
North Queensland Cowboys	6–38	Manly Warringah Sea Eagles	Thursday, 7:50 pm	Queensland Country Bank Stadium	Gerard Sutton	17,476
Canberra Raiders	26–22	Melbourne Storm	Friday, 6:00 pm	GIO Stadium	Peter Gough	17,321
Dolphins	22–23*	Penrith Panthers	Friday, 8:00 pm	TIO Stadium	Adam Gee	12,570
New Zealand Warriors	28–20	Gold Coast Titans	Saturday, 3:00 pm	Go Media Stadium	Wyatt Raymond	24,112
South Sydney Rabbitohs	30–12	St. George Illawarra Dragons	Saturday, 5:30 pm	Accor Stadium	Ziggy Przeklasa-Adamski	15,116
Wests Tigers	20–21	Brisbane Broncos	Saturday, 7:30 pm	Campbelltown Sports Stadium	Todd Smith	17,316
Sydney Roosters	38–24	Newcastle Knights	Sunday, 2:00 pm	Allianz Stadium	Ashley Klein	22,409
Parramatta Eels	38–20	Canterbury-Bankstown Bulldogs	Sunday, 4:05 pm	CommBank Stadium	Liam Kennedy	25,938
Bye: Cronulla-Sutherland Sharks

=== Round 8 (ANZAC Round) ===
April 23–26

Home	Score	Away	Match information			
Home	Score	Away	Day & time	Venue	Referee	Attendance
Wests Tigers	33–14	Canberra Raiders	Thursday, 7:50 pm	Leichhardt Oval	Ashley Klein	17,153
North Queensland Cowboys	46–34	Cronulla-Sutherland Sharks	Friday, 6:00 pm	Queensland Country Bank Stadium	Belinda Sharpe	17,886
Brisbane Broncos	32–12	Canterbury-Bankstown Bulldogs	Friday, 8:00 pm	Suncorp Stadium	Wyatt Raymond	42,775
St. George Illawarra Dragons	16–62	Sydney Roosters	Saturday, 4:00 pm	Allianz Stadium	Grant Atkins	40,381
New Zealand Warriors	20–18	Dolphins	Saturday, 6:05 pm	Hnry Stadium	Liam Kennedy	34,812
Melbourne Storm	6–48	South Sydney Rabbitohs	Saturday, 8:10 pm	AAMI Park	Adam Gee	25,694
Newcastle Knights	12–44	Penrith Panthers	Sunday, 2:00 pm	McDonald Jones Stadium	Gerard Sutton	23,986
Manly Warringah Sea Eagles	33–18	Parramatta Eels	Sunday, 4:05 pm	4 Pines Park	Peter Gough	17,389
Bye: Gold Coast Titans

- New Zealand recorded their biggest home crowd since round 1, 2012 and the biggest NRL crowd ever in Wellington.
- South Sydney won their first ever game in Victoria, breaking a 20 game losing streak in the state.
- Melbourne recorded their worst loss at home since round 20, 2001.

=== Round 9 ===
May 1–3

Home	Score	Away	Match information			
Home	Score	Away	Day & time	Venue	Referee	Attendance
Canterbury-Bankstown Bulldogs	12–28	North Queensland Cowboys	Friday, 6:00 pm	Accor Stadium	Peter Gough	15,132
Dolphins	28–10	Melbourne Storm	Friday, 8:00 pm	Suncorp Stadium	Ashley Klein	24,070
Gold Coast Titans	12–28	Canberra Raiders	Saturday, 3:00 pm	Cbus Super Stadium	Grant Atkins	14,913
Parramatta Eels	14–36	New Zealand Warriors	Saturday, 5:30 pm	CommBank Stadium	Gerard Sutton	16,657
Sydney Roosters	38–24	Brisbane Broncos	Saturday, 7:30 pm	Allianz Stadium	Adam Gee	25,239
Newcastle Knights	42–38	South Sydney Rabbitohs	Sunday, 2:00 pm	McDonald Jones Stadium	Liam Kennedy	23,413
Cronulla-Sutherland Sharks	52–10	Wests Tigers	Sunday, 4:05 pm	Ocean Protect Stadium	Todd Smith	14,479
Penrith Panthers	18–16	Manly Warringah Sea Eagles	Sunday, 6:15 pm	CommBank Stadium	Wyatt Raymond	14,960
Bye: St. George Illawarra Dragons

- Melbourne lost seven games in a row for the first time in their history.
- South Sydney recorded their highest ever losing score and outright second highest losing score in NRL history.

=== Round 10 ===
May 7–10

Home	Score	Away	Match information			
Home	Score	Away	Day & time	Venue	Referee	Attendance
Dolphins	44–12	Canterbury-Bankstown Bulldogs	Thursday, 7:50 pm	Suncorp Stadium	Grant Atkins	16,143
Sydney Roosters	28–12	Gold Coast Titans	Friday, 6:00 pm	polytec Stadium	Peter Gough	12,226
North Queensland Cowboys	30–33*	Parramatta Eels	Friday, 8:00 pm	Queensland Country Bank Stadium	Liam Kennedy	17,626
St. George Illawarra Dragons	10–44	Newcastle Knights	Saturday, 3:00 pm	WIN Stadium	Todd Smith	10,916
South Sydney Rabbitohs	36–12	Cronulla-Sutherland Sharks	Saturday, 5:30 pm	Accor Stadium	Jarrod Cole	16,714
Manly Warringah Sea Eagles	32–4	Brisbane Broncos	Saturday, 7:30 pm	4 Pines Park	Gerard Sutton	17,269
Melbourne Storm	44–16	Wests Tigers	Sunday, 2:00 pm	AAMI Park	Adam Gee	15,684
Canberra Raiders	18–30	Penrith Panthers	Sunday, 4:05 pm	GIO Stadium	Ashley Klein	18,018
Bye: New Zealand Warriors

- For the first time, a side won by 3 points and from 2 scoring shots in a golden point match in Parramatta's win over North Queensland. Mitchell Moses kicked the field goal to put Parramatta up 31–30 and win the game, but a penalty was awarded to Parramatta for pressure on the kicker. Ronald Volkman would convert the penalty goal to make the final score 33–30 to Parramatta, but the field goal is considered the winning play.
- Melbourne's 44–16 win over the West Tigers ended its club record 7 game losing streak.

=== Round 11 (Magic Round) ===
May 15–17

Home	Score	Away	Match information			
Home	Score	Away	Day & time	Venue	Referee	Attendance
Cronulla-Sutherland Sharks	38–16	Canterbury-Bankstown Bulldogs	Friday, 6:00 pm	Suncorp Stadium	Gerard Sutton	48,673
South Sydney Rabbitohs	10–32	Dolphins	Friday, 8:00 pm	Suncorp Stadium	Adam Gee	48,673
Wests Tigers	18–46	Manly Warringah Sea Eagles	Saturday, 3:00 pm	Suncorp Stadium	Grant Atkins	49,602
Sydney Roosters	12–18	North Queensland Cowboys	Saturday, 5:30 pm	Suncorp Stadium	Todd Smith	49,602
Parramatta Eels	8–34	Melbourne Storm	Saturday, 7:45 pm	Suncorp Stadium	Peter Gough	49,602
Gold Coast Titans	12–36	Newcastle Knights	Sunday, 2:00 pm	Suncorp Stadium	Wyatt Raymond	50,386
New Zealand Warriors	42–12	Brisbane Broncos	Sunday, 4:05 pm	Suncorp Stadium	Ashley Klein	50,386
Penrith Panthers	28–6	St. George Illawarra Dragons	Sunday, 6:25 pm	Suncorp Stadium	Jarrod Cole	50,386
Bye: Canberra Raiders

=== Round 12 ===
May 21–24

Home	Score	Away	Match information			
Home	Score	Away	Day & time	Venue	Referee	Attendance
Canberra Raiders	22–30	Dolphins	Thursday, 7:50 pm	GIO Stadium	Todd Smith	9,543
Canterbury-Bankstown Bulldogs	30–20	Melbourne Storm	Friday, 8:00 pm	Accor Stadium	Wyatt Raymond	14,372
St. George Illawarra Dragons	12–30	New Zealand Warriors	Saturday, 5:30 pm	St. George Venues Jubilee Stadium	Adam Gee	8,741
Manly Warringah Sea Eagles	12–10	Gold Coast Titans	Saturday, 7:30 pm	4 Pines Park	Gerard Sutton	13,173
North Queensland Cowboys	30–18	South Sydney Rabbitohs	Sunday, 4:05 pm	Queensland Country Bank Stadium	Grant Atkins	18,888
Bye: Brisbane Broncos, Cronulla-Sutherland Sharks, Newcastle Knights, Parramatta Eels, Penrith Panthers, Sydney Roosters, Wests Tigers

- Canterbury-Bankstown became just the third side to play 2000 first grade games after the Sydney Roosters and South Sydney.

=== Round 13 ===
May 29–31

Home	Score	Away	Match information			
Home	Score	Away	Day & time	Venue	Referee	Attendance
Cronulla-Sutherland Sharks	28–22	Manly Warringah Sea Eagles	Friday, 8:00 pm	Ocean Protect Stadium	Todd Smith	10,793
Newcastle Knights	28–22	Parramatta Eels	Saturday, 3:00 pm	McDonald Jones Stadium	Jarrod Cole	23,001
Wests Tigers	22–16	Canterbury-Bankstown Bulldogs	Saturday, 5:30 pm	CommBank Stadium	Peter Gough	17,505
Melbourne Storm	18–4	Sydney Roosters	Saturday, 7:30 pm	AAMI Park	Grant Atkins	16,628
Brisbane Broncos	26–30	St. George Illawarra Dragons	Sunday, 2:00 pm	Suncorp Stadium	Wyatt Raymond	42,275
Canberra Raiders	26–12	North Queensland Cowboys	Sunday, 4:05 pm	GIO Stadium	Ashley Klein	12,258
Penrith Panthers	20–18	New Zealand Warriors	Sunday, 6:15pm	CommBank Stadium	Gerard Sutton	17,640
Bye: Dolphins, Gold Coast Titans, South Sydney Rabbitohs

- St George Illawarra ended a club record 15 game losing streak in their win against the Brisbane Broncos.

=== Round 14 ===
June 4–8

Home	Score	Away	Match information			
Home	Score	Away	Day & time	Venue	Referee	Attendance
Manly Warringah Sea Eagles	28–14	South Sydney Rabbitohs	Thursday, 7:50 pm	4 Pines Park	Adam Gee	15,451
Melbourne Storm	32–30	Newcastle Knights	Friday, 6:00 pm	AAMI Park	Ashley Klein	14,268
Canberra Raiders	0–26	Sydney Roosters	Friday, 8:00 pm	GIO Stadium	Gerard Sutton	13,836
North Queensland Cowboys	14–40	Dolphins	Saturday, 5:30 pm	Queensland Country Bank Stadium	Wyatt Raymond	21,911
Brisbane Broncos	23–28	Gold Coast Titans	Saturday, 7:30 pm	Suncorp Stadium	Jarrod Cole	41,087
Wests Tigers	0–68	Penrith Panthers	Sunday, 2:00 pm	CommBank Stadium	Grant Atkins	21,803
Cronulla-Sutherland Sharks	34–12	St. George Illawarra Dragons	Sunday, 4:05 pm	Ocean Protect Stadium	Liam Kennedy	14,989
Canterbury-Bankstown Bulldogs	14–12	Parramatta Eels	Monday, 4:00 pm	Accor Stadium	Todd Smith	37,638
Bye: New Zealand Warriors

- Penrith's 68-point victory over the Tigers was the biggest margin of victory in the club's history, surpassing their 60 point win over Manly Warringah in 2004. It was also the second-most points Penrith have scored in a game, after the aforementioned game against Manly which Penrith won 72–12.

=== Round 15 ===
June 11–14

Home	Score	Away	Match information			
Home	Score	Away	Day & time	Venue	Referee	Attendance
South Sydney Rabbitohs	48–6	Brisbane Broncos	Thursday, 7:50 pm	Accor Stadium	Grant Atkins	12,784
Dolphins	48–10	Sydney Roosters	Friday, 8:00 pm	Suncorp Stadium	Todd Smith	20,687
New Zealand Warriors	8–10	Cronulla-Sutherland Sharks	Saturday, 5:30 pm	Go Media Stadium	Gerard Sutton	24,938
Parramatta Eels	15–12	Canberra Raiders	Saturday, 7:30 pm	CommBank Stadium	Ziggy Przeklasa-Adamski	16,657
Wests Tigers	36–28	Gold Coast Titans	Sunday, 4:05 pm	Leichhardt Oval	Wyatt Raymond	17,773
Bye: Canterbury-Bankstown Bulldogs, Manly Warringah Sea Eagles, Melbourne Storm, Newcastle Knights, North Queensland Cowboys, Penrith Panthers, St. George Illawarra Dragons

=== Round 16 ===
June 19–21

Home	Score	Away	Match information			
Home	Score	Away	Day & time	Venue	Referee	Attendance
Newcastle Knights	22–20	St. George Illawarra Dragons	Friday, 8:00 pm	McDonald Jones Stadium	Gerard Sutton	19,092
Wests Tigers	22–36	Dolphins	Saturday, 3:00 pm	Campbelltown Sports Stadium	Ziggy Przeklasa-Adamski	12,281
Gold Coast Titans	19–18	Penrith Panthers	Saturday, 5:30 pm	Cbus Super Stadium	Peter Gough	20,049
Canterbury-Bankstown Bulldogs	13–12*	Manly Warringah Sea Eagles	Saturday, 7:30 pm	Accor Stadium	Adam Gee	18,243
New Zealand Warriors	38–20	North Queensland Cowboys	Sunday, 2:00 pm	One New Zealand Stadium	Grant Atkins	24,365
Melbourne Storm	42–20	Canberra Raiders	Sunday, 4:05 pm	AAMI Park	Todd Smith	19,326
Sydney Roosters	27–8	Cronulla-Sutherland Sharks	Sunday, 6:15 pm	Allianz Stadium	Ashley Klein	20,021
Bye: Brisbane Broncos, Parramatta Eels, South Sydney Rabbitohs

=== Round 17 (Beanie for Brain Cancer Round) ===
June 25–28

Home	Score	Away	Match information			
Home	Score	Away	Day & time	Venue	Referee	Attendance
Parramatta Eels	12–32	South Sydney Rabbitohs	Thursday, 7:50pm	CommBank Stadium	Gerard Sutton	14,365
Gold Coast Titans	12–30	Canterbury-Bankstown Bulldogs	Friday, 6:00 pm	Cbus Super Stadium	Todd Smith	13,820
Brisbane Broncos	18–24	Sydney Roosters	Friday, 8:00 pm	Suncorp Stadium	Grant Atkins	39,826
Dolphins	26–24	New Zealand Warriors	Saturday, 3:00 pm	Suncorp Stadium	Adam Gee	40,465
North Queensland Cowboys	26–12	Penrith Panthers	Saturday, 5:30 pm	Queensland Country Bank Stadium	Wyatt Raymond	22,888
Manly Warringah Sea Eagles	30–4	Melbourne Storm	Saturday, 7:30 pm	4 Pines Park	Ashley Klein	17,221
Canberra Raiders	24–16	St. George Illawarra Dragons	Sunday, 2:00 pm	GIO Stadium	Ziggy Przeklasa-Adamski	12,531
Newcastle Knights	12–6	Wests Tigers	Sunday, 4:05 pm	McDonald Jones Stadium	Peter Gough	22,968
Bye: Cronulla-Sutherland Sharks

=== Round 18 ===
July 3–5

Home	Score	Away	Match information			
Home	Score	Away	Day & time	Venue	Referee	Attendance
Penrith Panthers	36–14	South Sydney Rabbitohs	Friday, 8:00 pm	CommBank Stadium	Adam Gee	15,163
St. George Illawarra Dragons	24–10	Wests Tigers	Saturday, 5:30pm	St. George Venues Jubilee Stadium	Todd Smith	12,431
Brisbane Broncos	16–28	Cronulla-Sutherland Sharks	Saturday, 7:30 pm	Suncorp Stadium	Gerard Sutton	38,998
Parramatta Eels	23–14	Manly Warringah Sea Eagles	Sunday, 2:00 pm	CommBank Stadium	Grant Atkins	18,778
Newcastle Knights	13–12	Dolphins	Sunday, 4:05 pm	McDonald Jones Stadium	Wyatt Raymond	16,896
Bye: Canberra Raiders, Canterbury-Bankstown Bulldogs, Gold Coast Titans, Melbourne Storm, New Zealand Warriors, North Queensland Cowboys, Sydney Roosters

=== Round 19 ===
July 10–12

Home	Score	Away	Match information			
Home	Score	Away	Day & time	Venue	Referee	Attendance
Wests Tigers	6–32	New Zealand Warriors	Friday, 8:00 pm	Campbelltown Sports Stadium	Wyatt Raymond	10,445
Dolphins	0–66	Cronulla-Sutherland Sharks	Saturday, 3:00 pm	Kayo Stadium	Todd Smith	10,023
Canterbury-Bankstown Bulldogs	16–40	Canberra Raiders	Saturday, 5:30 pm	Accor Stadium	Gerard Sutton	19,801
Sydney Roosters	28–12	Parramatta Eels	Saturday, 7:30 pm	Allianz Stadium	Adam Gee	23,222
South Sydney Rabbitohs	26–24	Newcastle Knights	Sunday, 2:00 pm	Accor Stadium	Grant Atkins	30,113
Manly Warringah Sea Eagles	18–19*	North Queensland Cowboys	Sunday, 4:05 pm	4 Pines Park	Peter Gough	16,892
Melbourne Storm	22–18	Gold Coast Titans	Sunday, 6:15 pm	AAMI Park	Tyson Brough	12,386
Bye: Brisbane Broncos, Penrith Panthers, St. George Illawarra Dragons

=== Round 20 (Women in League Round) ===
July 16–19

Home	Score	Away	Match information			
Home	Score	Away	Day & time	Venue	Referee	Attendance
Penrith Panthers	12–14	Brisbane Broncos	Thursday, 7:50 pm	CommBank Stadium	Todd Smith	15,437
Cronulla-Sutherland Sharks	20–18	Newcastle Knights	Friday, 6:00 pm	Ocean Protect Stadium	Ashley Klein	11,123
Sydney Roosters	14–6	Melbourne Storm	Friday, 8:00 pm	Allianz Stadium	Gerard Sutton	16,010
Canberra Raiders	34–24	South Sydney Rabbitohs	Saturday, 3:00 pm	GIO Stadium	Wyatt Raymond	19,659
New Zealand Warriors	20–12	St. George Illawarra Dragons	Saturday, 5:30 pm	Go Media Stadium	Jarrod Cole	23,895
Canterbury-Bankstown Bulldogs	32–0	Wests Tigers	Saturday, 7:30 pm	Accor Stadium	Tyson Brough	20,050
Gold Coast Titans	38–32	Manly Warringah Sea Eagles	Sunday, 2:00 pm	Cbus Super Stadium	Adam Gee	15,252
Dolphins	36–16	North Queensland Cowboys	Sunday, 4:05 pm	Suncorp Stadium	Grant Atkins	35,213
Bye: Parramatta Eels

=== Round 21 ===
July 23–26

Home	Score	Away	Match information			
Home	Score	Away	Day & time	Venue	Referee	Attendance
Parramatta Eels	18–24	Penrith Panthers	Thursday, 7:50 pm	CommBank Stadium	Gerard Sutton	15,562
Newcastle Knights	22–23	Sydney Roosters	Friday, 6:00 pm	McDonald Jones Stadium	Wyatt Raymond	21,313
South Sydney Rabbitohs	28–26	Melbourne Storm	Friday, 8:00 pm	Accor Stadium	Ashley Klein	10,009
Canberra Raiders	56–10	Wests Tigers	Saturday, 3:00 pm	GIO Stadium	Jarrod Cole	16,223
Canterbury-Bankstown Bulldogs	18–6	New Zealand Warriors	Saturday, 5:30 pm	Accor Stadium	Adam Gee	22,135
North Queensland Cowboys	18–10	Brisbane Broncos	Saturday, 7:30 pm	Queensland Country Bank Stadium	Tyson Brough	25,461
St. George Illawarra Dragons	18–38	Gold Coast Titans	Sunday, 2:00 pm	St. George Venues Jubilee Stadium	Todd Smith	9,031
Manly Warringah Sea Eagles	12–48	Cronulla-Sutherland Sharks	Sunday, 4:05 pm	4 Pines Park	Grant Atkins	17,126
Bye: Dolphins

- North Queensland recorded their largest home crowd since round 23, 2011.

=== Round 22 ===
July 30 – August 2

Home	Score	Away	Match information			
Home	Score	Away	Day & time	Venue	Referee	Attendance
North Queensland Cowboys	12–82	Sydney Roosters	Thursday, 7:50 pm	Queensland Country Bank Stadium	Ashley Klein	15,835
St. George Illawarra Dragons	22–28	Dolphins	Friday, 6:00 pm	WIN Stadium	Kieren Irons	9,218
Melbourne Storm	22–36	Canterbury-Bankstown Bulldogs	Friday, 8:00 pm	AAMI Park	Gerard Sutton	19,243
Gold Coast Titans	6–42	New Zealand Warriors	Saturday, 3:00 pm	Cbus Super Stadium	Jarrod Cole	25,181
Penrith Panthers	42–18	Canberra Raiders	Saturday, 5:30 pm	Glen Willow Oval	Adam Gee	10,000
Brisbane Broncos	6–30	Newcastle Knights	Saturday, 7:30 pm	Suncorp Stadium	Grant Atkins	37,538
Cronulla-Sutherland Sharks	32–16	South Sydney Rabbitohs	Sunday, 2:00 pm	Ocean Protect Stadium	Todd Smith	14,125
Wests Tigers	13–16	Parramatta Eels	Sunday, 4:05 pm	CommBank Stadium	Liam Kennedy	13,125
Bye: Manly Warringah Sea Eagles

- The Roosters became the first side to score 80 points since round 6, 1935, recorded their biggest win since that same match, and became the first team to score 14 tries in a game since round 24, 2003.
- The crowd of 25,181 between the Gold Coast Titans and the New Zealand Warriors at Cbus Super Stadium was the biggest crowd between these two sides.

=== Round 23 (Indigenous Round) ===
August 6–9

Home	Score	Away	Match information			
Home	Score	Away	Day & time	Venue	Referee	Attendance
Gold Coast Titans	8–30	North Queensland Cowboys	Thursday, 7:50 pm	Cbus Super Stadium	Adam Gee	11,743
New Zealand Warriors	28–12	Penrith Panthers	Friday, 6:00 pm	Go Media Stadium	Gerard Sutton	25,987
Sydney Roosters	20–18	Canterbury-Bankstown Bulldogs	Friday, 8:00 pm	Allianz Stadium	Grant Atkins	30,306
Melbourne Storm	42–20	Manly Warringah Sea Eagles	Saturday, 3:00 pm	HBF Park	Kieren Irons	15,169
Dolphins	40–32	Brisbane Broncos	Saturday, 5:30 pm	Suncorp Stadium	Todd Smith	50,188
South Sydney Rabbitohs	28–24	Parramatta Eels	Saturday, 7:30 pm	Allianz Stadium	Wyatt Raymond	19,077
Canberra Raiders	24–30	Newcastle Knights	Sunday, 2:00 pm	GIO Stadium	Ashley Klein	8,507
St. George Illawarra Dragons	24–16	Cronulla-Sutherland Sharks	Sunday, 4:05 pm	St. George Venues Jubilee Stadium	Liam Kennedy	11,018
Bye: Wests Tigers

- With their loss to the Dolphins, the Brisbane Broncos became the first reigning premiers to miss the finals the following season since the Wests Tigers in 2006.

=== Round 24 (Indigenous Round) ===
August 13–16

Home	Score	Away	Match information			
Home	Score	Away	Day & time	Venue	Referee	Attendance
Penrith Panthers	6–12	Sydney Roosters	Thursday, 7:50 pm	CommBank Stadium	Adam Gee	16,768
Manly Warringah Sea Eagles	0–22	Dolphins	Friday, 6:00 pm	4 Pines Park	Grant Atkins	11,108
Canterbury-Bankstown Bulldogs	6–22	South Sydney Rabbitohs	Friday, 8:00 pm	Accor Stadium	Ashley Klein	26,582
Cronulla-Sutherland Sharks	20–24	Canberra Raiders	Saturday, 3:00 pm	Ocean Protect Stadium	Gerard Sutton	12,358
Parramatta Eels	32–30	North Queensland Cowboys	Saturday, 5:30 pm	CommBank Stadium	Todd Smith	12,804
Brisbane Broncos	6–40	New Zealand Warriors	Saturday, 7:30 pm	Suncorp Stadium	Wyatt Raymond	38,916
Newcastle Knights	36–26	Gold Coast Titans	Sunday, 2:00 pm	McDonald Jones Stadium	Liam Kennedy	20,003
Wests Tigers	22–24	St. George Illawarra Dragons	Sunday, 4:05 pm	CommBank Stadium	Peter Gough	9,773
Bye: Melbourne Storm

- Manly were held scoreless at Brookvale Oval (aka 4 Pines Park) for the first time since round 6, 1993

=== Round 25 (Telstra Together Round) ===
August 20–23

Home	Score	Away	Match information			
Home	Score	Away	Day & time	Venue	Referee	Attendance
Melbourne Storm	14–22	Penrith Panthers	Thursday, 7:50 pm	AAMI Park	Grant Atkins	17,880
Canberra Raiders	30–34	Brisbane Broncos	Friday, 6:00 pm	GIO Stadium	Adam Gee	20,512
Dolphins	34–16	Parramatta Eels	Friday, 8:00 pm	Suncorp Stadium	Gerard Sutton	24,728
Newcastle Knights	24–44	Manly Warringah Sea Eagles	Saturday, 3:00 pm	McDonald Jones Stadium	Wyatt Raymond	24,537
South Sydney Rabbitohs	26–45	New Zealand Warriors	Saturday, 5:30 pm	Accor Stadium	Todd Smith	19,531
St. George Illawarra Dragons	14–44	Canterbury-Bankstown Bulldogs	Saturday, 7:30 pm	Allianz Stadium	Liam Kennedy	14,711
Gold Coast Titans	22–30	Cronulla-Sutherland Sharks	Sunday, 2:00 pm	Cbus Super Stadium	Peter Gough	16,074
Sydney Roosters	24–25	Wests Tigers	Sunday, 4:05 pm	Allianz Stadium	Ashley Klein	26,240
Bye: North Queensland Cowboys

- With their loss to Penrith, the Melbourne Storm missed the finals with a losing record for the first time since 2002, the first of coach Craig Bellamy's 24 year career. (Note: The Melbourne Storm also missed the finals in 2010, when the club was penalised for salary cap breaches and received the wooden spoon; the club would have otherwise finished fifth on the ladder that year.) It was also the first time both reigning Grand Finalists missed out on the finals the following year since 2006.
- Penrith won in Melbourne at AAMI Park for the first time since round 25, 2018.

=== Round 26 ===
August 27–30

Home	Score	Away	Match information			
Home	Score	Away	Day & time	Venue	Referee	Attendance
Brisbane Broncos	20–46	Melbourne Storm	Thursday, 7:50 pm	Suncorp Stadium	Wyatt Raymond	36,476
Manly Warringah Sea Eagles	44–10	St. George Illawarra Dragons	Friday, 6:00 pm	4 Pines Park	Nick Pelgrave	13,597
Penrith Panthers	24–10	Canterbury-Bankstown Bulldogs	Friday, 8:00 pm	CommBank Stadium	Gerard Sutton	19,979
Gold Coast Titans	22–42	South Sydney Rabbitohs	Saturday, 3:00 pm	Cbus Super Stadium	Liam Kennedy	22,108
Sydney Roosters	12–26	Dolphins	Saturday, 5:30 pm	Allianz Stadium	Todd Smith	23,216
North Queensland Cowboys	24–10	Wests Tigers	Saturday, 7:30 pm	Queensland Country Bank Stadium	Grant Atkins	17,888
New Zealand Warriors	46–32	Newcastle Knights	Sunday, 2:00 pm	Go Media Stadium	Adam Gee	25,853
Parramatta Eels	38–18	Cronulla-Sutherland Sharks	Sunday, 4:05 pm	CommBank Stadium	Ashley Klein	18,074
Bye: Canberra Raiders

- St George Illawarra won their first wooden spoon as a joint venture club.

=== Round 27 ===
September 3–6

Home	Score	Away	Match information			
Home	Score	Away	Day & time	Venue	Referee	Attendance
Canterbury-Bankstown Bulldogs	20–34	Brisbane Broncos	Thursday, 7:50 pm	Accor Stadium	Grant Atkins	13,802
Gold Coast Titans	20–24	Dolphins	Friday, 6:00 pm	Cbus Super Stadium	Wyatt Raymond	17,053
South Sydney Rabbitohs	50–20	Sydney Roosters	Friday, 8:00 pm	Allianz Stadium	Adam Gee	41,513
New Zealand Warriors	31–30	Manly Warringah Sea Eagles	Saturday, 3:00 pm	Go Media Stadium	Gerard Sutton	26,206
North Queensland Cowboys	30–50	Canberra Raiders	Saturday, 5:30 pm	Queensland Country Bank Stadium	Nick Pelgrave	18,982
Cronulla-Sutherland Sharks	20–24	Melbourne Storm	Saturday, 7:30 pm	Ocean Protect Stadium	Todd Smith	12,184
St. George Illawarra Dragons	24–22	Parramatta Eels	Sunday, 2:00 pm	WIN Stadium	Liam Kennedy	17,013
Penrith Panthers	38–10	Wests Tigers	Sunday, 4:05 pm	CommBank Stadium	Ashley Klein	18,332
Bye: Newcastle Knights

== Finals series ==
Home	Score	Away	Match Information
Home	Score	Away	Date and time (AEST)	Venue	Referee	Attendance
Qualifying and elimination finals
South Sydney Rabbitohs	10–20	Newcastle Knights	11 September, 19:50	Allianz Stadium	Ashley Klein	28,152
New Zealand Warriors	16–26	Dolphins	12 September, 16:05	Go Media Stadium	Adam Gee	26,131
Cronulla-Sutherland Sharks	26–16	North Queensland Cowboys	12 September, 19:50	Allianz Stadium	Grant Atkins	17,249
Penrith Panthers	19–12	Sydney Roosters	13 September, 16:05	Commbank Stadium	Gerard Sutton	22,148
Semi-finals
Sydney Roosters	46–10	Cronulla-Sutherland Sharks	19 September, 19:50	Allianz Stadium	Adam Gee	39,147
New Zealand Warriors	10–12	Newcastle Knights	20 September, 16:05	Eden Park	Ashley Klein	48,511
Preliminary finals
Dolphins	20–36	Sydney Roosters	25 September, 19:50	Suncorp Stadium	Adam Gee	52,286
Penrith Panthers	14–22	Newcastle Knights	27 September, 16:00	Accor Stadium	Gerard Sutton	57,102
Grand Final
Sydney Roosters	19–18	Newcastle Knights	4 October, 18:30	Accor Stadium	Adam Gee	80,814

- The crowd of 48,511 at the New Zealand vs Newcastle semi final broke the record for the highest attended rugby league match in New Zealand.
- Newcastle became the first side to go from a wooden spoon to a Grand Final the following year since 2010.
- The crowd of 80,814 for the Grand Final was the largest crowd Newcastle have played in front of since the 2001 Grand Final.
- Sydney became the first team to win the comp after conceding 50 points.

=== Bracket ===
Qualifying and elimination finals
13 September – Sydney
1	Penrith	19
4	Sydney	12
12 September – Sydney
5	Cronulla	26
8	North Queensland	16
11 September – Sydney
6	South Sydney	10
7	Newcastle	20
12 September – Auckland
2	New Zealand	16
3	Dolphins	26

Semi-finals
19 September – Sydney
Sydney	46
Cronulla	10
20 September – Auckland
New Zealand	10
Newcastle	12

Preliminary finals
27 September – Sydney
Penrith	14
Newcastle	22
25 September – Brisbane
Dolphins	20
Sydney	36

Grand final
4 October – Sydney
Sydney	19
Newcastle	18

== Stadiums used ==
Stadium	Games played	Teams / Events	Total attendance	Average attendance	Highest attendance
4 Pines Park	12	Manly Warringah Sea Eagles	189,668	15,806	17,389
AAMI Park	11	Melbourne Storm	214,085	19,462	28,245
Accor Stadium	20	Canterbury-Bankstown Bulldogs, South Sydney Rabbitohs, Grand Final	524,307	26,215	80,814
Allegiant Stadium	2 (Note: Includes 1 double-header.)	Canterbury-Bankstown Bulldogs, Newcastle Knights	45,719	45,719	45,719
Allianz Stadium	17	South Sydney Rabbitohs, St. George Illawarra Dragons, Sydney Roosters	450,625	26,507	41,513
Campbelltown Sports Stadium	4	Wests Tigers	55,263	13,816	17,316
Carrington Park	1	Penrith Panthers	12,000	12,000	12,000
Cbus Super Stadium	11	Gold Coast Titans	194,657	17,696	26,223
CommBank Stadium	25	Parramatta Eels, Penrith Panthers, Wests Tigers	453,837	18,153	29,397
Eden Park	1	New Zealand Warriors	48,511	48,511	48,511
GIO Stadium	12	Canberra Raiders	179,588	14,966	20,512
Glen Willow Oval	1	Penrith Panthers	10,000	10,000	10,000
Go Media Stadium	10	New Zealand Warriors	248,547	24,855	26,206
HBF Park	1	Melbourne Storm	15,169	15,169	15,169
Hnry Stadium	1	New Zealand Warriors	34,812	34,812	34,812
Kayo Stadium	2	Dolphins	20,046	10,023	10,023
Leichhardt Oval	3	Wests Tigers	52,563	17,521	17,773
McDonald Jones Stadium	11	Newcastle Knights	239,893	21,808	24,537
Ocean Protect Stadium	10	Cronulla-Sutherland Sharks	125,807	12,581	14,989
One New Zealand Stadium	1	New Zealand Warriors	24,365	24,365	24,365
Optus Stadium	2 (Note: Includes 1 double-header.)	Cronulla-Sutherland Sharks, South Sydney Rabbitohs	33,404	33,404	33,404
polytec Stadium	2	South Sydney Rabbitohs, Sydney Roosters	32,166	16,083	19,940
Queensland Country Bank Stadium	12	North Queensland Cowboys	232,771	19,398	25,461
St. George Venues Jubilee Stadium	5	St. George Illawarra Dragons	49,712	9,942	12,431
Suncorp Stadium	30 (Note: Includes 1 double-header & 2 triple-headers.)	Brisbane Broncos, Dolphins, Magic Round	942,564	37,703	52,286
TIO Stadium	1	Dolphins	12,570	12,570	12,570
WIN Stadium	5	St. George Illawarra Dragons	60,039	12,008	17,013
