= 2025 NRL Pre-season Challenge =

- Duration: 7 – 23 February 2025
- Teams: 17
- Premiers: Brisbane Broncos (2nd title)
- Matches played: 17
- Points scored: 852

The 2025 NRL Pre-season Challenge of the National Rugby League was played from 7 to 23 February 2025, before a 7-day lead up until the beginning of the 2025 NRL season.

Brisbane Broncos claimed the A$100,000 prize for finishing atop the ladder at the end of the competition for the second successive year.

== Standings ==
The winner of the Pre-season Challenge receives $100,000 AUD. Twelve competition points are awarded for a win and six for a draw. One bonus competition point is awarded for each of the following: 5 or more tries, 5 or more line breaks, and 10 or more offloads.

Pos	Team	Pld	W	D	L	PF	PA	PD	BP	Pts
1	Brisbane Broncos (C)	2	2	0	0	80	26	+54	5	29
2	St. George Illawarra Dragons	2	2	0	0	72	34	+38	5	29
3	New Zealand Warriors	2	1	1	0	48	22	+26	3	21
4	Cronulla-Sutherland Sharks	2	1	1	0	52	22	+30	2	20
5	Wests Tigers	2	1	0	1	44	38	+6	5	17
6	Dolphins	2	1	0	1	68	34	+34	3	15
7	Manly Warringah Sea Eagles	2	1	0	1	56	62	−6	3	15
8	Gold Coast Titans	2	1	0	1	38	68	−30	3	15
9	Parramatta Eels	2	1	0	1	62	48	+14	2	14
10	Newcastle Knights	2	1	0	1	66	54	+12	2	14
11	North Queensland Cowboys	2	1	0	1	44	74	−30	2	14
12	Penrith Panthers	2	1	0	1	54	44	+10	1	13
13	Canterbury-Bankstown Bulldogs	2	1	0	1	34	44	−10	1	13
14	Canberra Raiders	2	1	0	1	32	56	−24	1	13
15	South Sydney Rabbitohs	2	0	0	2	50	80	−30	2	2
16	Melbourne Storm	2	0	0	2	34	72	−38	2	2
17	Sydney Roosters	2	0	0	2	18	74	−56	1	1

Source: NRL.com
(C) Champions

== Fixtures ==
=== First week ===
7 February 2025
18:30 AEST (UTC+10:00)

Cronulla-Sutherland Sharks	12–12	New Zealand Warriors
	Report

Sharks Stadium, Sydney
Referee: Liam Kennedy

8 February 2025
18:30 AEST (UTC+10:00)

Penrith Panthers	16–22	Canberra Raiders
	Report

Sharks Stadium, Sydney
Attendance: 1,724
Referee: Belinda Sharpe

=== Second week ===
13 February 2025
18:50 AEST (UTC+10:00)

Canberra Raiders	10–40	Cronulla-Sutherland Sharks
	Report

GIO Stadium, Canberra
Attendance: 3,580
Referee: Liam Kennedy

14 February 2025
17:00 AEST (UTC+10:00)

Newcastle Knights	18–44	Parramatta Eels
	Report

McDonald Jones Stadium, Newcastle
Attendance: 5,964
Referee: Belinda Sharpe

14 February 2025
19:00 AEST (UTC+10:00)

North Queensland Cowboys	8–50	Dolphins
	Report

Barlow Park, Cairns
Attendance: 6,936
Referee: Damian Brady

15 February 2025
12:30 AEST (UTC+10:00)

New Zealand Warriors	36–10	Melbourne Storm
	Report

FMG Stadium Waikato, Hamilton
Attendance: 23,344
Referee: Ziggy Przeklasa-Adamski

15 February 2025
14:30 AEST (UTC+10:00)

South Sydney Rabbitohs	24–34	Manly Warringah Sea Eagles
	Report

Industree Group Stadium, Gosford
Attendance: 5,679
Referee: Peter Gough

16 February 2025
14:30 AEST (UTC+10:00)

Brisbane Broncos	50–12	Gold Coast Titans
	Report

Toowoomba Sports Ground, Toowoomba
Attendance: 6,805
Referee: Daniel Schwass

16 February 2025
16:30 AEST (UTC+10:00)

Canterbury-Bankstown Bulldogs	20–14	Wests Tigers
	Report

Netstrata Jubilee Stadium, Sydney
Attendance: 7,281
Referee: Chris Butler

16 February 2025
18:30 AEST (UTC+10:00)

St. George Illawarra Dragons	26–8	Sydney Roosters
	Report

Netstrata Jubilee Stadium, Sydney
Attendance: 7,281
Referee: Wyatt Raymond

=== Third week ===
21 February 2025
17:00 AEST (UTC+10:00)

Manly Warringah Sea Eagles	22–38	Penrith Panthers
	Report

Leichhardt Oval, Sydney
Referee: Grant Atkins

21 February 2025
19:00 AEST (UTC+10:00)

Wests Tigers	30–18	Parramatta Eels
	Report

Leichhardt Oval, Sydney
Referee: Ashley Klein

22 February 2025
14:00 AEST (UTC+10:00)

St. George Illawarra Dragons	46–26	South Sydney Rabbitohs
	Report

Glen Willow Oval, Mudgee
Attendance: 8,417
Referee: Adam Gee

22 February 2025
16:30 AEST (UTC+10:00)

Brisbane Broncos	30–14	Canterbury-Bankstown Bulldogs
	Report

Kayo Stadium, Redcliffe
Referee: Todd Smith

22 February 2025
18:30 AEST (UTC+10:00)

Dolphins	18–26	Gold Coast Titans
	Report

Kayo Stadium, Redcliffe
Referee: Gerard Sutton

23 February 2025
14:15 AEST (UTC+10:00)

Sydney Roosters	10–48	Newcastle Knights
	Report

Industree Group Stadium, Gosford
Attendance: 4,964
Referee: Peter Gough

23 February 2025
16:15 AEST (UTC+10:00)

Melbourne Storm	24–36	North Queensland Cowboys
	Report

Casey Fields, Melbourne
Attendance: 6,182
Referee: Chris Butler

== See also ==
- 2025 NRL season
- 2025 NRL season results
