= 2025 NRL season results =

The 2025 NRL season was the 118th of professional rugby league in Australia and the 28th season run by the National Rugby League.

All times are listed in AEST (UTC+10).

Scores with asterisk (*) indicates golden point games.

== Regular season ==
=== Round 1 ===
March 2–9

Home	Score	Away	Match information			
Home	Score	Away	Day & Time	Venue	Referee	Attendance
Canberra Raiders	30–8	New Zealand Warriors	Sunday 2 March, 10:00 am	Allegiant Stadium	Grant Atkins	45,209
Penrith Panthers	28–22	Cronulla-Sutherland Sharks	Sunday 2 March, 2:30 pm	Allegiant Stadium	Ashley Klein	45,209
Sydney Roosters	14–50	Brisbane Broncos	Thursday 6 March, 7:00 pm	Allianz Stadium	Gerard Sutton	23,226
Wests Tigers	8–10	Newcastle Knights	Friday 7 March, 5:00 pm	Campbelltown Sports Stadium	Liam Kennedy	13,160
South Sydney Rabbitohs	16–14	Dolphins	Friday 7 March, 7:00 pm	CommBank Stadium	Adam Gee	6,738
St. George Illawarra Dragons	20–28	Canterbury-Bankstown Bulldogs	Saturday 8 March, 4:30 pm	Jubilee Stadium	Todd Smith	16,211
Manly Warringah Sea Eagles	42–12	North Queensland Cowboys	Saturday 8 March, 6:35 pm	4 Pines Park	Peter Gough	17,335
Melbourne Storm	56–18	Parramatta Eels	Sunday 9 March, 3:05 pm	AAMI Park	Wyatt Raymond	23,369
Bye: Gold Coast Titans

- For a second consecutive season, the NRL season commenced with a split round, beginning with a double-header at Allegiant Stadium in Las Vegas, Nevada. As per the previous year, the NRL's attendance figure of 45,209 for the event was later contradicted by the Las Vegas Stadium Authority, who reported a reduced attendance of 38,107.
- The match between the Dolphins and South Sydney was originally scheduled to take place at Suncorp Stadium but was moved to CommBank Stadium with Souths to host the match instead due to severe weather in South East Queensland from Tropical Cyclone Alfred. As compensation, the Dolphins will host the return game in round 17.
- The Brisbane Broncos and Melbourne Storm both scored 50 points, the first time more than one team had done so in round 1.
- The Melbourne Storm recorded their highest round 1 home attendance in the club's history.

=== Round 2 ===
March 13–16

Home	Score	Away	Match information			
Home	Score	Away	Day & Time	Venue	Referee	Attendance
Newcastle Knights	26–12	Dolphins	Thursday, 7:00 pm	McDonald Jones Stadium	Gerard Sutton	18,531
New Zealand Warriors	36–16	Manly Warringah Sea Eagles	Friday, 5:00 pm	Go Media Stadium	Adam Gee	21,212
Penrith Panthers	32–38	Sydney Roosters	Friday, 7:05 pm	CommBank Stadium	Todd Smith	12,180
St. George Illawarra Dragons	24–25	South Sydney Rabbitohs	Saturday, 2:00 pm	WIN Stadium	Ashley Klein	16,111
North Queensland Cowboys	12–36	Cronulla-Sutherland Sharks	Saturday, 4:30 pm	Queensland Country Bank Stadium	Liam Kennedy	18,714
Canberra Raiders	32–22	Brisbane Broncos	Saturday, 6:35 pm	GIO Stadium	Wyatt Raymond	18,884
Parramatta Eels	6–32	Wests Tigers	Sunday, 3:05 pm	CommBank Stadium	Grant Atkins	18,362
Canterbury-Bankstown Bulldogs	40–24	Gold Coast Titans	Sunday, 5:15 pm	Belmore Sports Ground	Peter Gough	17,892
Bye: Melbourne Storm

- The Sydney Roosters ended a 10 match losing streak against Penrith, their longest against any side to date.

=== Round 3 ===
March 20–23

Home	Score	Away	Match information			
Home	Score	Away	Day & Time	Venue	Referee	Attendance
Melbourne Storm	30–24	Penrith Panthers	Thursday, 7:00 pm	AAMI Park	Adam Gee	17,586
New Zealand Warriors	14–6	Sydney Roosters	Friday, 5:00 pm	Go Media Stadium	Ashley Klein	23,219
Brisbane Broncos	26–16	North Queensland Cowboys	Friday, 7:05 pm	Suncorp Stadium	Todd Smith	45,317
Cronulla-Sutherland Sharks	27–12	South Sydney Rabbitohs	Saturday, 2:00 pm	Sharks Stadium	Gerard Sutton	14,320
Dolphins	18–30	Wests Tigers	Saturday, 4:30 pm	Kayo Stadium	Peter Gough	10,023
Gold Coast Titans	26–6	Newcastle Knights	Saturday, 6:35 pm	Cbus Super Stadium	Liam Kennedy	14,602
Parramatta Eels	8–16	Canterbury-Bankstown Bulldogs	Sunday, 3:05 pm	CommBank Stadium	Wyatt Raymond	24,059
Manly Warringah Sea Eagles	40–12	Canberra Raiders	Sunday, 5:15 pm	4 Pines Park	Grant Atkins	16,125
Bye: St. George Illawarra Dragons

=== Round 4 ===
March 27–30

Home	Score	Away	Match information			
Home	Score	Away	Day & Time	Venue	Referee	Attendance
South Sydney Rabbitohs	28–18	Penrith Panthers	Thursday, 7:00 pm	Accor Stadium	Ashley Klein	10,029
Sydney Roosters	12–30	Gold Coast Titans	Friday, 5:00 pm	Allianz Stadium	Grant Atkins	14,101
Dolphins	12–20	Brisbane Broncos	Friday, 7:05 pm	Suncorp Stadium	Gerard Sutton	44,278
St. George Illawarra Dragons	14–8	Melbourne Storm	Saturday, 2:00 pm	Jubilee Stadium	Peter Gough	6,211
North Queensland Cowboys	30–20	Canberra Raiders	Saturday, 4:30 pm	Queensland Country Bank Stadium	Adam Gee	15,897
Cronulla-Sutherland Sharks	6–20	Canterbury-Bankstown Bulldogs	Saturday, 6:35 pm	Sharks Stadium	Chris Butler	11,703
Manly Warringah Sea Eagles	26–12	Parramatta Eels	Sunday, 3:05 pm	4 Pines Park	Todd Smith	17,286
Wests Tigers	24–26	New Zealand Warriors	Sunday, 5:15 pm	Campbelltown Sports Stadium	Wyatt Raymond	12,020
Bye: Newcastle Knights

- St George Illawarra defeated the Storm in consecutive matches for the first time since 1999.
- Canterbury recorded their best start to a season since 1993.

=== Round 5 (Multicultural Round) ===
April 3–6

Home	Score	Away	Match information			
Home	Score	Away	Day & Time	Venue	Referee	Attendance
Canberra Raiders	24–20	Cronulla-Sutherland Sharks	Thursday, 7:00 pm	GIO Stadium	Todd Smith	10,914
Penrith Panthers	18–22	North Queensland Cowboys	Friday, 5:00 pm	CommBank Stadium	Peter Gough	10,320
South Sydney Rabbitohs	20–14	Sydney Roosters	Friday, 7:05 pm	Accor Stadium	Adam Gee	22,114
Parramatta Eels	23–22*	St. George Illawarra Dragons	Saturday, 2:00 pm	CommBank Stadium	Gerard Sutton	19,302
Gold Coast Titans	10–36	Dolphins	Saturday, 4:30 pm	Cbus Super Stadium	Wyatt Raymond	13,167
Brisbane Broncos	46–24	Wests Tigers	Saturday, 6:35 pm	Suncorp Stadium	Liam Kennedy	41,011
Manly Warringah Sea Eagles	24–48	Melbourne Storm	Sunday, 4:05 pm	4 Pines Park	Grant Atkins	17,346
Canterbury-Bankstown Bulldogs	20–0	Newcastle Knights	Sunday, 6:15 pm	Accor Stadium	Ashley Klein	24,113
Bye: New Zealand Warriors

- Penrith lost 4 games in a row for the first time since 2019.

=== Round 6 ===
April 10–13

Home	Score	Away	Match information			
Home	Score	Away	Day & Time	Venue	Referee	Attendance
Dolphins	30–12	Penrith Panthers	Thursday, 7:50 pm	Suncorp Stadium	Grant Atkins	19,103
St. George Illawarra Dragons	38–16	Gold Coast Titans	Friday, 6:00 pm	WIN Stadium	Chris Butler	8,510
Brisbane Broncos	16–26	Sydney Roosters	Friday, 8:00 pm	Suncorp Stadium	Peter Gough	40,814
Cronulla-Sutherland Sharks	24–18	Manly Warringah Sea Eagles	Saturday, 3:00 pm	Optus Stadium	Adam Gee	31,347
South Sydney Rabbitohs	16–24	North Queensland Cowboys	Saturday, 5:30 pm	Optus Stadium	Todd Smith	31,347
Parramatta Eels	12–50	Canberra Raiders	Saturday, 7:35 pm	TIO Stadium	Wyatt Raymond	9,556
Melbourne Storm	42–14	New Zealand Warriors	Sunday, 2:00 pm	AAMI Park	Ashley Klein	26,427
Newcastle Knights	4–20	Wests Tigers	Sunday, 4:05 pm	McDonald Jones Stadium	Gerard Sutton	25,960
Bye: Canterbury-Bankstown Bulldogs

=== Round 7 (Easter Round) ===
April 17–21

Home	Score	Away	Match information			
Home	Score	Away	Day & Time	Venue	Referee	Attendance
Manly Warringah Sea Eagles	18–20	St. George Illawarra Dragons	Thursday, 7:50 pm	4 Pines Park	Peter Gough	17,254
Canterbury-Bankstown Bulldogs	32–0	South Sydney Rabbitohs	Friday, 4:05 pm	Accor Stadium	Grant Atkins	65,305
Dolphins	42–22	Melbourne Storm	Friday, 8:00 pm	Suncorp Stadium	Todd Smith	28,024
New Zealand Warriors	20–18*	Brisbane Broncos	Saturday, 5:30 pm	Go Media Stadium	Chris Butler	22,395
Sydney Roosters	12–40	Penrith Panthers	Saturday, 7:35 pm	Allianz Stadium	Gerard Sutton	20,373
Gold Coast Titans	20–30	Canberra Raiders	Sunday, 2:00 pm	Cbus Super Stadium	Adam Gee	15,089
Newcastle Knights	14–34	Cronulla-Sutherland Sharks	Sunday, 4:05 pm	McDonald Jones Stadium	Ashley Klein	24,248
Wests Tigers	22–38	Parramatta Eels	Monday, 4:00 pm	CommBank Stadium	Liam Kennedy	26,145
Bye: North Queensland Cowboys

- The Canterbury-Bankstown vs South Sydney match attracted the largest regular season crowd in NRL history (excluding double headers), beating the previous record crowd set in round 26, 2013.
- Canterbury scored their 1000th try at Accor Stadium in the opening try of the match scored by Josh Curran, the first club to achieve this feat since the stadium opened in 1999.
- Luke Metcalf's match winning penalty goal in golden point against the Broncos (50m) was the second longest penalty goal ever kicked since Kyle Feldt (55m) in 2018

=== Round 8 (ANZAC Round) ===
April 24–27

Home	Score	Away	Match information			
Home	Score	Away	Day & Time	Venue	Referee	Attendance
Brisbane Broncos	42–18	Canterbury-Bankstown Bulldogs	Thursday, 7:50 pm	Suncorp Stadium	Gerard Sutton	40,233
Sydney Roosters	46–18	St. George Illawarra Dragons	Friday, 4:00 pm	Allianz Stadium	Todd Smith	41,021
New Zealand Warriors	26–12	Newcastle Knights	Friday, 6:00 pm	Apollo Projects Stadium	Wyatt Raymond	17,095
Melbourne Storm	24–16	South Sydney Rabbitohs	Friday, 8:00 pm	AAMI Park	Peter Gough	26,010
North Queensland Cowboys	50–18	Gold Coast Titans	Saturday, 5:30 pm	Queensland Country Bank Stadium	Chris Butler	20,349
Penrith Panthers	10–26	Manly Warringah Sea Eagles	Saturday, 7:35 pm	CommBank Stadium	Belinda Sharpe	14,534
Canberra Raiders	40–28	Dolphins	Sunday, 2:00 pm	GIO Stadium	Ashley Klein	15,686
Wests Tigers	20–18*	Cronulla-Sutherland Sharks	Sunday, 4:05 pm	Leichhardt Oval	Grant Atkins	14,812
Bye: Parramatta Eels

=== Round 9 (Magic Round) ===
May 2–4

Home	Score	Away	Match information			
Home	Score	Away	Day & Time	Venue	Referee	Attendance
Cronulla-Sutherland Sharks	28–18	Parramatta Eels	Friday, 6:00 pm	Suncorp Stadium	Peter Gough	48,359
Sydney Roosters	36–26	Dolphins	Friday, 8:05 pm	Suncorp Stadium	Grant Atkins	48,359
South Sydney Rabbitohs	4–30	Newcastle Knights	Saturday, 3:00 pm	Suncorp Stadium	Liam Kennedy	50,658
New Zealand Warriors	30–26	North Queensland Cowboys	Saturday, 5:30 pm	Suncorp Stadium	Adam Gee	50,658
Wests Tigers	34–28	St. George Illawarra Dragons	Saturday, 7:45 pm	Suncorp Stadium	Wyatt Raymond	50,658
Gold Coast Titans	18–38	Canterbury-Bankstown Bulldogs	Sunday, 1:50 pm	Suncorp Stadium	Todd Smith	50,309
Penrith Panthers	32–8	Brisbane Broncos	Sunday, 4:05 pm	Suncorp Stadium	Ashley Klein	50,309
Melbourne Storm	18–20	Canberra Raiders	Sunday, 6:25 pm	Suncorp Stadium	Gerard Sutton	50,309
Bye: Manly Warringah Sea Eagles

=== Round 10 (Women in League Round) ===
May 8–11

Home	Score	Away	Match information			
Home	Score	Away	Day & Time	Venue	Referee	Attendance
Parramatta Eels	16–20	Dolphins	Thursday, 7:50 pm	CommBank Stadium	Wyatt Raymond	11,214
Newcastle Knights	20–24	Gold Coast Titans	Friday, 6:00 pm	McDonald Jones Stadium	Belinda Sharpe	15,193
South Sydney Rabbitohs	22–14	Brisbane Broncos	Friday, 8:00 pm	Accor Stadium	Peter Gough	13,747
Canberra Raiders	20–32	Canterbury-Bankstown Bulldogs	Saturday, 3:00 pm	GIO Stadium	Adam Gee	23,827
St. George Illawarra Dragons	14–15	New Zealand Warriors	Saturday, 5:30 pm	WIN Stadium	Liam Kennedy	12,919
North Queensland Cowboys	30–30*	Penrith Panthers	Saturday, 7:35 pm	Queensland Country Bank Stadium	Todd Smith	19,324
Melbourne Storm	64–0	Wests Tigers	Sunday, 2:00 pm	AAMI Park	Grant Atkins	17,376
Manly Warringah Sea Eagles	14–30	Cronulla-Sutherland Sharks	Sunday, 4:05 pm	4 Pines Park	Gerard Sutton	15,823
Bye: Sydney Roosters

- For the first time in NRL history, 2 teams came back from 20 point deficits to win the game within the same round, with the Titans and Bulldogs coming back from 20-0 down against their respective teams.

=== Round 11 ===
May 16–18

Home	Score	Away	Match information			
Home	Score	Away	Day & Time	Venue	Referee	Attendance
Newcastle Knights	6–28	Parramatta Eels	Friday, 6:00 pm	McDonald Jones Stadium	Todd Smith	20,125
Canterbury-Bankstown Bulldogs	24–20	Sydney Roosters	Friday, 8:00 pm	Accor Stadium	Ashley Klein	30,166
Dolphins	12–16	New Zealand Warriors	Saturday, 3:00 pm	Suncorp Stadium	Peter Gough	32,165
North Queensland Cowboys	6–24	Manly Warringah Sea Eagles	Saturday, 5:30 pm	Queensland Country Bank Stadium	Grant Atkins	18,965
Cronulla-Sutherland Sharks	31–26	Melbourne Storm	Saturday, 7:35 pm	Sharks Stadium	Adam Gee	11,570
Brisbane Broncos	26–30	St. George Illawarra Dragons	Sunday, 2:00 pm	Suncorp Stadium	Gerard Sutton	38,016
Canberra Raiders	40–24	Gold Coast Titans	Sunday, 4:05 pm	GIO Stadium	Liam Kennedy	9,650
Wests Tigers	12–22	South Sydney Rabbitohs	Sunday, 6:15 pm	Campbelltown Sports Stadium	Wyatt Raymond	11,110
Bye: Penrith Panthers

=== Round 12 ===
May 22–25

Home	Score	Away	Match information			
Home	Score	Away	Day & Time	Venue	Referee	Attendance
Canterbury-Bankstown Bulldogs	8–44	Dolphins	Thursday, 7:50 pm	Accor Stadium	Todd Smith	10,412
Parramatta Eels	30–10	Manly Warringah Sea Eagles	Friday, 8:00 pm	CommBank Stadium	Liam Kennedy	13,425
Penrith Panthers	6–25	Newcastle Knights	Saturday, 5:30 pm	Carrington Park	Belinda Sharpe	12,000
Sydney Roosters	42–16	Cronulla-Sutherland Sharks	Saturday, 7:35 pm	Industree Group Stadium	Grant Atkins	13,399
New Zealand Warriors	10–16	Canberra Raiders	Sunday, 4:05 pm	Go Media Stadium	Adam Gee	26,512
Bye: Brisbane Broncos, Gold Coast Titans, Melbourne Storm, North Queensland Cowboys, South Sydney Rabbitohs, St. George Illawarra Dragons, Wests Tigers

=== Round 13 ===
May 30–June 1

Home	Score	Away	Match information			
Home	Score	Away	Day & Time	Venue	Referee	Attendance
St. George Illawarra Dragons	20–6	Newcastle Knights	Friday, 8:00 pm	Jubilee Stadium	Grant Atkins	10,411
Gold Coast Titans	16–28	Melbourne Storm	Saturday, 3:00 pm	Cbus Super Stadium	Ziggy Przeklasa-Adamski	13,509
North Queensland Cowboys	32–28	Wests Tigers	Saturday, 5:30 pm	Queensland Country Bank Stadium	Gerard Sutton	17,470
Manly Warringah Sea Eagles	34–6	Brisbane Broncos	Saturday, 7:35 pm	4 Pines Park	Adam Gee	17,375
South Sydney Rabbitohs	30–36	New Zealand Warriors	Sunday, 2:00 pm	Accor Stadium	Wyatt Raymond	16,237
Penrith Panthers	18–10	Parramatta Eels	Sunday, 4:05 pm	CommBank Stadium	Peter Gough	21,282
Sydney Roosters	24–26	Canberra Raiders	Sunday, 6:15pm	Allianz Stadium	Ashley Klein	17,223
Bye: Canterbury-Bankstown Bulldogs, Cronulla-Sutherland Sharks, Dolphins

- Alex Johnston scored his 200th try in South Sydney's loss to the Warriors, becoming only the second person after Ken Irvine to achieve this feat in the NRL and its predecessors since 1908

=== Round 14 ===
June 5–9

Home	Score	Away	Match information			
Home	Score	Away	Day & Time	Venue	Referee	Attendance
Newcastle Knights	26–22*	Manly Warringah Sea Eagles	Thursday, 7:50 pm	McDonald Jones Stadium	Wyatt Raymond	16,027
Melbourne Storm	38–14	North Queensland Cowboys	Friday, 6:00 pm	AAMI Park	Grant Atkins	19,096
Dolphins	56–6	St. George Illawarra Dragons	Friday, 8:00 pm	Suncorp Stadium	Adam Gee	19,513
Cronulla-Sutherland Sharks	10–40	New Zealand Warriors	Saturday, 5:30 pm	Sharks Stadium	Peter Gough	13,727
Brisbane Broncos	44–14	Gold Coast Titans	Saturday, 7:35 pm	Suncorp Stadium	Ashley Klein	39,884
Canberra Raiders	36–12	South Sydney Rabbitohs	Sunday, 2:00 pm	GIO Stadium	Todd Smith	19,438
Wests Tigers	14–18	Penrith Panthers	Sunday, 4:05 pm	CommBank Stadium	Ziggy Przeklasa-Adamski	17,708
Canterbury-Bankstown Bulldogs	30–12	Parramatta Eels	Monday, 4:00 pm	Accor Stadium	Gerard Sutton	59,878
Bye: Sydney Roosters

=== Round 15 ===
June 12–15

Home	Score	Away	Match information			
Home	Score	Away	Day & Time	Venue	Referee	Attendance
Cronulla-Sutherland Sharks	30–18	St. George Illawarra Dragons	Thursday, 7:50 pm	Sharks Stadium	Grant Atkins	8,573
Gold Coast Titans	28–8	Manly Warringah Sea Eagles	Friday, 8:00 pm	Cbus Super Stadium	Peter Gough	13,708
Newcastle Knights	8–12	Sydney Roosters	Saturday, 5:30 pm	McDonald Jones Stadium	Gerard Sutton	24,849
North Queensland Cowboys	4–58	Dolphins	Saturday, 7:35 pm	Queensland Country Bank Stadium	Todd Smith	18,343
South Sydney Rabbitohs	18–24	Canterbury-Bankstown Bulldogs	Sunday, 4:05 pm	Accor Stadium	Adam Gee	23,871
Bye: Brisbane Broncos, Canberra Raiders, Melbourne Storm, New Zealand Warriors, Parramatta Eels, Penrith Panthers, Wests Tigers

- The North Queensland Cowboys 58-4 loss to the Dolphins is their biggest ever defeat in a home game, and their biggest in any game since Round 21, 2001.
- For the first time since Round 8 2015, the Rabbitohs vs Bulldogs game had to be paused due to bad weather conditions (lightning).

=== Round 16 ===
June 20–22

Home	Score	Away	Match information			
Home	Score	Away	Day & Time	Venue	Referee	Attendance
Wests Tigers	12–16	Canberra Raiders	Friday, 8:00 pm	Campbelltown Sports Stadium	Adam Gee	9,328
New Zealand Warriors	18–28	Penrith Panthers	Saturday, 3:00 pm	Go Media Stadium	Todd Smith	25,012
Dolphins	20–26	Newcastle Knights	Saturday, 5:30 pm	HBF Park	Grant Atkins	10,077
South Sydney Rabbitohs	24–25*	Melbourne Storm	Saturday, 7:35 pm	Accor Stadium	Peter Gough	10,093
Brisbane Broncos	34–28	Cronulla-Sutherland Sharks	Sunday, 2:00 pm	Suncorp Stadium	Wyatt Raymond	39,042
Sydney Roosters	42–8	North Queensland Cowboys	Sunday, 4:05 pm	Allianz Stadium	Ashley Klein	21,143
Parramatta Eels	36–20	Gold Coast Titans	Sunday, 6:15 pm	CommBank Stadium	Gerard Sutton	8,074
Bye: Canterbury-Bankstown Bulldogs, Manly Warringah Sea Eagles, St. George Illawarra Dragons

=== Round 17 (Beanie for Brain Cancer Round) ===
June 26–29

Home	Score	Away	Match information			
Home	Score	Away	Day & Time	Venue	Referee	Attendance
Penrith Panthers	8–6	Canterbury-Bankstown Bulldogs	Thursday, 7:50pm	CommBank Stadium	Grant Atkins	16,738
Manly Warringah Sea Eagles	28–10	Wests Tigers	Friday, 6:00 pm	4 Pines Park	Gerard Sutton	17,055
Newcastle Knights	18–22	Canberra Raiders	Friday, 8:00 pm	McDonald Jones Stadium	Peter Gough	17,527
Brisbane Broncos	26–12	New Zealand Warriors	Saturday, 3:00 pm	Suncorp Stadium	Adam Gee	43,424
St. George Illawarra Dragons	34–20	Parramatta Eels	Saturday, 5:30 pm	WIN Stadium	Liam Kennedy	18,191
Dolphins	50–28	South Sydney Rabbitohs	Saturday, 7:50 pm	Suncorp Stadium	Todd Smith	22,041
Melbourne Storm	30–6	Cronulla-Sutherland Sharks	Sunday, 2:00 pm	AAMI Park	Ashley Klein	21,399
Gold Coast Titans	24–30	North Queensland Cowboys	Sunday, 4:05 pm	Cbus Super Stadium	Wyatt Raymond	13,382
Bye: Sydney Roosters

- The match between the Dolphins and South Sydney was originally scheduled to be held at Accor Stadium with Souths hosting the match. However, due to their Round 1 match being moved to CommBank Stadium and hosted by Souths due to severe weather in South East Queensland from Tropical Cyclone Alfred, their return game in Round 17 will become a Dolphins home game instead as compensation. The match was also rescheduled to a later start due to the Brisbane Broncos hosting a game at the same venue earlier in the day, without the games being packaged as a double-header.

=== Round 18 ===
July 4–6

Home	Score	Away	Match information			
Home	Score	Away	Day & Time	Venue	Referee	Attendance
Canterbury-Bankstown Bulldogs	18–22	Brisbane Broncos	Friday, 8:00 pm	Accor Stadium	Todd Smith	25,234
Canberra Raiders	28–24	St. George Illawarra Dragons	Saturday, 5:30pm	GIO Stadium	Gerard Sutton	15,932
North Queensland Cowboys	20–26	Melbourne Storm	Saturday, 7:35 pm	Queensland Country Bank Stadium	Liam Kennedy	20,383
Sydney Roosters	28–30	Wests Tigers	Sunday, 2:00 pm	Allianz Stadium	Peter Gough	24,311
Manly Warringah Sea Eagles	30–12	South Sydney Rabbitohs	Sunday, 4:05 pm	4 Pines Park	Wyatt Raymond	17,298
Bye: Cronulla-Sutherland Sharks, Dolphins, Gold Coast Titans, Newcastle Knights, New Zealand Warriors, Parramatta Eels, Penrith Panthers

=== Round 19 ===
July 11–13

Home	Score	Away	Match information			
Home	Score	Away	Day & Time	Venue	Referee	Attendance
Cronulla-Sutherland Sharks	24–12	Dolphins	Friday, 8:00 pm	Sharks Stadium	Adam Gee	9,658
Newcastle Knights	14–32	Melbourne Storm	Saturday, 3:00 pm	McDonald Jones Stadium	Todd Smith	21,107
St. George Illawarra Dragons	24–31	Sydney Roosters	Saturday, 5:30 pm	Jubilee Stadium	Grant Atkins	13,856
North Queensland Cowboys	8–12	Canterbury-Bankstown Bulldogs	Saturday, 7:35 pm	Queensland Country Bank Stadium	Wyatt Raymond	18,778
New Zealand Warriors	34–14	Wests Tigers	Sunday, 2:00 pm	Go Media Stadium	Gerard Sutton	24,112
Parramatta Eels	10–32	Penrith Panthers	Sunday, 4:05 pm	CommBank Stadium	Peter Gough	22,792
Gold Coast Titans	14–26	Brisbane Broncos	Sunday, 6:15 pm	Cbus Super Stadium	Liam Kennedy	24,553
Bye: Canberra Raiders, Manly Warringah Sea Eagles, South Sydney Rabbitohs

=== Round 20 ===
July 17–20

Home	Score	Away	Match information			
Home	Score	Away	Day & Time	Venue	Referee	Attendance
Dolphins	43–24	North Queensland Cowboys	Thursday, 7:50 pm	Suncorp Stadium	Peter Gough	23,172
Cronulla-Sutherland Sharks	31–18	Sydney Roosters	Friday, 6:00 pm	Sharks Stadium	Todd Smith	11,846
Penrith Panthers	30–10	South Sydney Rabbitohs	Friday, 8:00 pm	CommBank Stadium	Gerard Sutton	11,836
Canberra Raiders	40–16	Parramatta Eels	Saturday, 3:00 pm	GIO Stadium	Ashley Klein	20,751
Canterbury-Bankstown Bulldogs	20–18	St. George Illawarra Dragons	Saturday, 5:30 pm	Accor Stadium	Adam Gee	30,115
Melbourne Storm	16–18	Manly Warringah Sea Eagles	Saturday, 7:35 pm	AAMI Park	Wyatt Raymond	19,011
Wests Tigers	21–20	Gold Coast Titans	Sunday, 2:00 pm	Leichhardt Oval	Belinda Sharpe	16,073
Newcastle Knights	15–20	New Zealand Warriors	Sunday, 4:05 pm	McDonald Jones Stadium	Grant Atkins	21,117
Bye: Brisbane Broncos

=== Round 21 ===
July 24–27

Home	Score	Away	Match information			
Home	Score	Away	Day & Time	Venue	Referee	Attendance
Sydney Roosters	30–34	Melbourne Storm	Thursday, 7:50 pm	Allianz Stadium	Adam Gee	13,991
North Queensland Cowboys	38–32	St. George Illawarra Dragons	Friday, 6:00 pm	Queensland Country Bank Stadium	Grant Atkins	16,020
Brisbane Broncos	20–22	Parramatta Eels	Friday, 8:00 pm	Suncorp Stadium	Todd Smith	39,057
New Zealand Warriors	16–24	Gold Coast Titans	Saturday, 3:00 pm	Go Media Stadium	Gerard Sutton	24,212
Penrith Panthers	36–2	Wests Tigers	Saturday, 5:30 pm	CommBank Stadium	Peter Gough	16,753
South Sydney Rabbitohs	12–14	Cronulla-Sutherland Sharks	Saturday, 7:35 pm	polytec Stadium	Belinda Sharpe	13,986
Canberra Raiders	44–18	Newcastle Knights	Sunday, 2:00 pm	GIO Stadium	Wyatt Raymond	11,068
Canterbury-Bankstown Bulldogs	42–4	Manly Warringah Sea Eagles	Sunday, 4:05 pm	Allianz Stadium	Ashley Klein	25,801
Bye: Dolphins

- The game between Bulldogs and the Sea Eagles was their first at Allianz Stadium since the 2014 Semi-Final

=== Round 22 ===
July 31–August 3

Home	Score	Away	Match information			
Home	Score	Away	Day & Time	Venue	Referee	Attendance
Parramatta Eels	10–16	Melbourne Storm	Thursday, 7:50 pm	CommBank Stadium	Gerard Sutton	9,402
New Zealand Warriors	18–20	Dolphins	Friday, 6:00 pm	Go Media Stadium	Ashley Klein	23,012
Brisbane Broncos	60–14	South Sydney Rabbitohs	Friday, 8:00 pm	Suncorp Stadium	Peter Gough	38,430
Gold Coast Titans	26–30*	Penrith Panthers	Saturday, 3:00 pm	Cbus Super Stadium	Liam Kennedy	18,174
St. George Illawarra Dragons	18–12	Canberra Raiders	Saturday, 5:30 pm	WIN Stadium	Todd Smith	8,567
Manly Warringah Sea Eagles	4–20	Sydney Roosters	Saturday, 7:35 pm	4 Pines Park	Grant Atkins	12,478
Wests Tigers	28–14	Canterbury-Bankstown Bulldogs	Sunday, 2:00 pm	CommBank Stadium	Wyatt Raymond	17,423
Cronulla-Sutherland Sharks	32–12	North Queensland Cowboys	Sunday, 4:05 pm	Sharks Stadium	Adam Gee	6,321
Bye: Newcastle Knights

=== Round 23 (Indigenous Round) ===
August 7–10

Home	Score	Away	Match information			
Home	Score	Away	Day & Time	Venue	Referee	Attendance
Melbourne Storm	22–2	Brisbane Broncos	Thursday, 7:50 pm	AAMI Park	Grant Atkins	21,324
Newcastle Knights	12–48	Penrith Panthers	Friday, 6:00 pm	McDonald Jones Stadium	Wyatt Raymond	20,197
Canberra Raiders	28–12	Manly Warringah Sea Eagles	Friday, 8:00 pm	GIO Stadium	Peter Gough	14,527
St. George Illawarra Dragons	22–14	Cronulla-Sutherland Sharks	Saturday, 3:00 pm	Jubilee Stadium	Ashley Klein	11,861
Dolphins	12–64	Sydney Roosters	Saturday, 5:30 pm	Suncorp Stadium	Gerard Sutton	24,117
Canterbury-Bankstown Bulldogs	32–14	New Zealand Warriors	Saturday, 7:35 pm	Accor Stadium	Adam Gee	25,377
Gold Coast Titans	18–20	South Sydney Rabbitohs	Sunday, 2:00 pm	Cbus Super Stadium	Todd Smith	14,957
Parramatta Eels	19–18	North Queensland Cowboys	Sunday, 4:05 pm	CommBank Stadium	Liam Kennedy	11,562
Bye: Wests Tigers

- St. George Illawarra ended a 10 match losing streak against Cronulla-Sutherland.
- The Dolphins 64-12 loss to the Roosters was the biggest in the club's history.

=== Round 24 (Indigenous Round) ===
August 14–17

Home	Score	Away	Match information			
Home	Score	Away	Day & Time	Venue	Referee	Attendance
Penrith Panthers	18–22*	Melbourne Storm	Thursday, 7:50 pm	CommBank Stadium	Ashley Klein	12,869
New Zealand Warriors	14–10	St. George Illawarra Dragons	Friday, 6:00 pm	Go Media Stadium	Todd Smith	23,278
Sydney Roosters	32–12	Canterbury-Bankstown Bulldogs	Friday, 8:00 pm	Allianz Stadium	Grant Atkins	31,399
Cronulla-Sutherland Sharks	54–22	Gold Coast Titans	Saturday, 3:00 pm	Sharks Stadium	Peter Gough	10,112
Brisbane Broncos	38–28	Dolphins	Saturday, 5:30 pm	Suncorp Stadium	Wyatt Raymond	44,350
South Sydney Rabbitohs	20–16	Parramatta Eels	Saturday, 7:35 pm	Allianz Stadium	Gerard Sutton	21,395
Wests Tigers	26–12	Manly Warringah Sea Eagles	Sunday, 2:00 pm	Allianz Stadium	Adam Gee	13,105
North Queensland Cowboys	38–4	Newcastle Knights	Sunday, 4:05 pm	Queensland Country Bank Stadium	Jarrod Cole	16,640
Bye: Canberra Raiders

- Harry Grant scored the match winning try in golden point to win the game for the Storm.
- Jarrod Cole made his debut as referee between the Cowboys and the Knights

=== Round 25 (Telstra Footy Country Round) ===
August 21–24

Home	Score	Away	Match information			
Home	Score	Away	Day & Time	Venue	Referee	Attendance
South Sydney Rabbitohs	40–0	St. George Illawarra Dragons	Thursday, 7:50 pm	Accor Stadium	Gerard Sutton	7,213
Penrith Panthers	16–20*	Canberra Raiders	Friday, 6:00 pm	Glen Willow Oval	Grant Atkins	9,925
Melbourne Storm	20–14	Canterbury-Bankstown Bulldogs	Friday, 8:00 pm	AAMI Park	Adam Gee	25,693
Manly Warringah Sea Eagles	58–30	Dolphins	Saturday, 3:00 pm	4 Pines Park	Ashley Klein	14,172
Gold Coast Titans	18–32	New Zealand Warriors	Saturday, 5:30 pm	Cbus Super Stadium	Jarrod Cole	23,271
Parramatta Eels	30–10	Sydney Roosters	Saturday, 7:35 pm	CommBank Stadium	Wyatt Raymond	19,741
Newcastle Knights	12–46	Brisbane Broncos	Sunday, 2:00 pm	McDonald Jones Stadium	Todd Smith	25,814
Wests Tigers	28–34	North Queensland Cowboys	Sunday, 4:05 pm	Leichhardt Oval	Peter Gough	16,055
Bye: Cronulla-Sutherland Sharks

=== Round 26 ===
August 28–31

Home	Score	Away	Match information			
Home	Score	Away	Day & Time	Venue	Referee	Attendance
Canterbury-Bankstown Bulldogs	28–4	Penrith Panthers	Thursday, 7:50 pm	Accor Stadium	Wyatt Raymond	23,597
New Zealand Warriors	22–26	Parramatta Eels	Friday, 6:00 pm	Go Media Stadium	Peter Gough	25,012
Melbourne Storm	10–40	Sydney Roosters	Friday, 8:00 pm	AAMI Park	Todd Smith	21,155
Canberra Raiders	24–10	Wests Tigers	Saturday, 3:00 pm	GIO Stadium	Jarrod Cole	23,746
St. George Illawarra Dragons	24–40	Manly Warringah Sea Eagles	Saturday, 5:30 pm	Jubilee Stadium	Adam Gee	9,769
North Queensland Cowboys	30–38	Brisbane Broncos	Saturday, 7:35 pm	Queensland Country Bank Stadium	Ashley Klein	22,903
Cronulla-Sutherland Sharks	40–16	Newcastle Knights	Sunday, 2:00 pm	Sharks Stadium	Gerard Sutton	12,234
Dolphins	36–30	Gold Coast Titans	Sunday, 4:05 pm	Suncorp Stadium	Grant Atkins	19,305
Bye: South Sydney Rabbitohs

- The Canberra Raiders won their first minor premiership since 1990

=== Round 27 ===
September 4–7

Home	Score	Away	Match information			
Home	Score	Away	Day & Time	Venue	Referee	Attendance
Brisbane Broncos	30–14	Melbourne Storm	Thursday, 7:50 pm	Suncorp Stadium	Grant Atkins	44,645
Manly Warringah Sea Eagles	27–26	New Zealand Warriors	Friday, 6:00 pm	4 Pines Park	Todd Smith	17,172
Sydney Roosters	36–6	South Sydney Rabbitohs	Friday, 8:00 pm	Allianz Stadium	Adam Gee	41,604
St. George Illawarra Dragons	20–40	Penrith Panthers	Saturday, 3:00 pm	WIN Stadium	Peter Gough	17,442
Gold Coast Titans	36–28	Wests Tigers	Saturday, 5:30 pm	Cbus Super Stadium	Chris Butler	16,093
Canterbury-Bankstown Bulldogs	6–24	Cronulla-Sutherland Sharks	Saturday, 7:35 pm	Accor Stadium	Ashley Klein	30,368
Dolphins	62–24	Canberra Raiders	Sunday, 2:00 pm	Kayo Stadium	Gerard Sutton	10,023
Parramatta Eels	66–10	Newcastle Knights	Sunday, 4:05 pm	CommBank Stadium	Wyatt Raymond	23,359
Bye: North Queensland Cowboys

- James Fisher-Harris scored a try in the first 9 seconds of the New Zealand's match against Manly Warringah, the fastest in NRL history, surpassing the previous record of 11 seconds set by Kirisome Auva'a in 2017.
- Two teams scored over 60 points in a single round for the first time since Round 24, 2003.

== Finals series ==
Home	Score	Away	Match Information
Home	Score	Away	Date and time (Local)	Venue	Referee	Attendance
Qualifying and elimination finals
Melbourne Storm	26–18	Canterbury-Bankstown Bulldogs	12 September, 19:50	AAMI Park	Adam Gee	22,117
New Zealand Warriors	8–24	Penrith Panthers	13 September, 16:05	Go Media Stadium	Grant Atkins	24,524
Cronulla-Sutherland Sharks	20–10	Sydney Roosters	13 September, 19:50	Sharks Stadium	Todd Smith	12,842
Canberra Raiders	28–29*	Brisbane Broncos	14 September, 16:05	GIO Stadium	Ashley Klein	25,523
Semi-finals
Canberra Raiders	12–32	Cronulla-Sutherland Sharks	20 September, 19:50	GIO Stadium	Grant Atkins	24,322
Canterbury-Bankstown Bulldogs	26–46	Penrith Panthers	21 September, 16:05	Accor Stadium	Ashley Klein	56,872
Preliminary finals
Melbourne Storm	22–14	Cronulla-Sutherland Sharks	26 September, 19:50	AAMI Park	Ashley Klein	29,233
Brisbane Broncos	16–14	Penrith Panthers	28 September, 16:05	Suncorp Stadium	Grant Atkins	52,491
Grand Final
Melbourne Storm	22–26	Brisbane Broncos	5 October 2025, 18:30	Accor Stadium	Grant Atkins	80,223

- Brisbane ended a 19 year drought and become the premiers since 2006.
- Ben Hunt’s 10 year redemption since losing to the Cowboys in 2015.

=== Bracket ===
Qualifying and elimination finals
14 September – Canberra
1	Canberra	28
4	Brisbane	29
13 September – Sydney
5	Cronulla-Sutherland	20
8	Sydney	10
13 September – Auckland
6	New Zealand	8
7	Penrith	24
12 September – Melbourne
2	Melbourne	26
3	Canterbury-Bankstown	18

Semi-finals
20 September – Canberra
Canberra	12
Cronulla-Sutherland	32
21 September – Sydney
Canterbury-Bankstown	26
Penrith	46

Preliminary finals
28 September – Brisbane
Brisbane	16
Penrith	14
26 September – Melbourne
Melbourne	22
Cronulla-Sutherland	14

Grand final
5 October – Sydney
Melbourne	22
Brisbane	26

== Stadiums used ==
Stadium	Games played	Teams / Events	Total Attendance	Average Attendance	Highest Attendance
4 Pines Park	12	Manly Warringah Sea Eagles	196,719	16,393	17,375
AAMI Park	13	Melbourne Storm	289,796	22,292	29,233
Accor Stadium	19	Canterbury-Bankstown Bulldogs, South Sydney Rabbitohs, Grand Final	564,964	29,735	80,223
Allegiant Stadium	2 (Note: Includes 1 double-header.)	Canberra Raiders, Penrith Panthers	45,209	45,209	45,209
Allianz Stadium	13	Canterbury-Bankstown Bulldogs, Sydney Roosters, Indigenous Round	308,693	23,746	41,604
Apollo Projects Stadium	1	New Zealand Warriors	17,095	17,095	17,095
Belmore Sports Ground	1	Canterbury-Bankstown Bulldogs	17,892	17,892	17,892
Campbelltown Sports Stadium	4	Wests Tigers	45,618	11,405	13,160
Carrington Park	1	Penrith Panthers	12,000	12,000	12,000
Cbus Super Stadium	11	Gold Coast Titans	180,505	16,410	24,553
CommBank Stadium	23	Parramatta Eels, Penrith Panthers, South Sydney Rabbitohs, Wests Tigers	365,818	15,905	26,145
GIO Stadium	13	Canberra Raiders	234,268	18,021	25,523
Glen Willow Oval	1	Penrith Panthers	9,925	9,925	9,925
Go Media Stadium	11	New Zealand Warriors	262,500	23,864	26,512
HBF Park	1	Dolphins	10,077	10,077	10,077
Jubilee Stadium	6	St. George Illawarra Dragons	68,319	11,387	16,211
Kayo Stadium	2	Dolphins	20,046	10,023	10,023
Leichhardt Oval	3	Wests Tigers	46,940	15,647	16,073
McDonald Jones Stadium	12	Newcastle Knights	250,695	20,891	25,960
Optus Stadium	2 (Note: Includes 1 double-header.)	Cronulla-Sutherland Sharks, South Sydney Rabbitohs	31,347	31,347	31,347
polytec Stadium (Note: Also called Industree Group Stadium - the stadium secured new naming rights in July after one game had already been played)	2	Sydney Roosters, South Sydney Rabbitohs	27,385	13,693	13,986
Queensland Country Bank Stadium	12	North Queensland Cowboys	223,786	18,649	22,903
Sharks Stadium	11	Cronulla-Sutherland Sharks	122,906	11,173	14,320
Suncorp Stadium	31 (Note: Includes 1 double-header & 2 triple-headers.)	Brisbane Broncos, Dolphins, Magic Round	927,758	37,110	52,491
TIO Stadium	1	Parramatta Eels	9,556	9,556	9,556
WIN Stadium	6	St. George Illawarra Dragons	81,740	13,623	18,191
