= 2013 NRL season results =

The 2013 NRL season will consist of 26 weekly regular season rounds starting on March 7, followed by four weeks of play-offs that culminate in the grand final on October 6.

== Regular season ==
=== Round 1 ===
Home	Score	Away	Match information
Home	Score	Away	Date and time (Local)	Venue	Referees	Attendance
Sydney Roosters	10-28	South Sydney Rabbitohs	7 March 2013, 8:05pm	Allianz Stadium	Ben Cummins; Chris James	35,952
Brisbane Broncos	14-22	Manly-Warringah Sea Eagles	8 March 2013, 7:05pm	Suncorp Stadium	Shayne Hayne; Alan Shortall	31,139
Parramatta Eels	40-10	New Zealand Warriors	9 March 2013, 5:30pm	Parramatta Stadium	Jared Maxwell; Adam Gee	13,351
Canterbury-Bankstown Bulldogs	12-24	North Queensland Cowboys	9 March 2013, 7:30pm	Bluetongue Stadium	Jason Robinson; Gavin Morris	11,627
Penrith Panthers	32-10	Canberra Raiders	10 March 2013, 2:00pm	Centrebet Stadium	Adam Devcich; Henry Perenara	10,882
Melbourne Storm	30-10	St. George Illawarra Dragons	10 March 2013, 3:00pm	AAMI Park	Matt Cecchin; Luke Phillips	16,251
Cronulla-Sutherland Sharks	12-10	Gold Coast Titans	10 March 2013, 6:30pm	Sharks Stadium	Ashley Klein; Phil Haines	17,451
Newcastle Knights	42-10	Wests Tigers	11 March 2013, 7:00pm	Hunter Stadium	Gerard Sutton; Brett Suttor	21,935

=== Round 2 ===
Home	Score	Away	Match information
Home	Score	Away	Date and time (Local)	Venue	Referees	Attendance
Parramatta Eels	16-20	Canterbury-Bankstown Bulldogs	14 March 2013, 8:05pm	ANZ Stadium	Shayne Hayne; Alan Shortall	25,608
St. George Illawarra Dragons	6-22	Brisbane Broncos	15 March 2013, 8:05pm	WIN Stadium	Jason Robinson; Gavin Morris	13,156
North Queensland Cowboys	10-32	Melbourne Storm	16 March 2013, 6:30pm	1300SMILES Stadium	Gerard Sutton; Brett Suttor	19,288
New Zealand Warriors	14-16	Sydney Roosters	16 March 2013, 7:30pm	Eden Park	Ashley Klein; Phil Haines	32,740
Gold Coast Titans	36-0	Canberra Raiders	17 March 2013, 1:00pm	Skilled Park	Adam Devcich; Henry Perenara	12,267
Wests Tigers	28-18	Penrith Panthers	17 March 2013, 3:00pm	Campbelltown Sports Stadium	Ben Cummins; Matthew Norman	9,715
Manly-Warringah Sea Eagles	32-0	Newcastle Knights	17 March 2013, 6:30pm	Brookvale Oval	Matt Cecchin; Luke Phillips	12,263
South Sydney Rabbitohs	14-12	Cronulla-Sutherland Sharks	18 March 2013, 7:00pm	ANZ Stadium	Jared Maxwell; Adam Gee	14,128

=== Round 3 ===
Home	Score	Away	Match information
Home	Score	Away	Date and time (Local)	Venue	Referees	Attendance
Melbourne Storm	22-18	Canterbury-Bankstown Bulldogs	21 March 2013, 8:05pm	AAMI Park	Ben Cummins; Chris James	11,923
Wests Tigers	31-18	Parramatta Eels	22 March 2013, 8:05pm	Leichhardt Oval	Shayne Hayne; Alan Shortall	18,326
Gold Coast Titans	16-14	Manly-Warringah Sea Eagles	23 March 2013, 4:30pm	Skilled Park	Matt Cecchin; Luke Phillips	13,168
Sydney Roosters	8-0	Brisbane Broncos	23 March 2013, 7:30pm	Allianz Stadium	Gerard Sutton; Brett Suttor	13,047
Cronulla-Sutherland Sharks	28 - 4	New Zealand Warriors	24 March 2013, 2:00pm	Sharks Stadium	Adam Devcich; Henry Perenara	12,183
Penrith Panthers	32 - 44	South Sydney Rabbitohs	24 March 2013, 3:00pm	Centrebet Stadium	Ashley Klein; Phil Haines	12,940
Canberra Raiders	30 - 17	St. George Illawarra Dragons	24 March 2013, 6:30pm	Canberra Stadium	Jared Maxwell; Gavin Badger	12,115
Newcastle Knights	34 -6	North Queensland Cowboys	25 March 2013, 7:00pm	Hunter Stadium	Jason Robinson; Gavin Morris	15,758

=== Round 4 ===
- The Melbourne Storm will play their 400th NRL match.

Home	Score	Away	Match information
Home	Score	Away	Date and time (Local)	Venue	Referees	Attendance
Manly-Warringah Sea Eagles	26 - 0	Wests Tigers	28 March 2013, 8:10pm	Bluetongue Stadium	Matt Cecchin; Luke Phillips	11,758
Canterbury-Bankstown Bulldogs	12 - 17	South Sydney Rabbitohs	29 March 2013, 4:00pm	ANZ Stadium	Shayne Hayne; Alan Shortall	51,686
Brisbane Broncos	26 - 32	Melbourne Storm	29 March 2013, 7:10pm	Suncorp Stadium	Jared Maxwell; Adam Devcich	40,071
Cronulla-Sutherland Sharks	12 - 25	St. George Illawarra Dragons	30 March 2013, 7:30pm	Sharks Stadium	Phil Haines; Ashley Klein	20,130
Penrith Panthers	10 - 28	Gold Coast Titans	31 March 2013, 3:00pm	Centrebet Stadium	Gavin Morris; Jason Robinson	8,181
Newcastle Knights	28 - 12	Canberra Raiders	31 March 2013, 6:30pm	Hunter Stadium	Gerard Sutton; Brett Suttor	18,869
New Zealand Warriors	20 - 18	North Queensland Cowboys	1 April 2013, 4:00pm	Mt Smart Stadium	Gavin Badger; Henry Perenara	10,572
Sydney Roosters	50 - 0	Parramatta Eels	1 April 2013, 7:00pm	Allianz Stadium	Ben Cummins; Chris James	18,014

- The Roosters scored 50+ for the first time since Round 13 2007, they also held their opposition to nil for the second week in a row, becoming the 17th team in History to achieve that feat, and the first team to do it since Brisbane who did it in Round 24 and Round 25 2006, it was also the 6th time (as well as the record of 3) the Roosters had achieved that feat, and the first time since Rounds 2 and 3 1999, they would do it again in Rounds 17 and 19 (bye Round 18) this season.

=== Round 5 ===
Home	Score	Away	Match information
Home	Score	Away	Date and time (Local)	Venue	Referees	Attendance
Canterbury-Bankstown Bulldogs	6 - 20	Manly-Warringah Sea Eagles	5 April 2013, 7:35pm	ANZ Stadium	Ashley Klein; Phil Haines	18,563
Gold Coast Titans	12 - 32	Brisbane Broncos	5 April 2013, 7:35pm	Skilled Park	Shayne Hayne; Alan Shortall	22,749
Parramatta Eels	13 - 6	Cronulla-Sutherland Sharks	6 April 2013, 5:30pm	Parramatta Stadium	Gavin Badger; Henry Perenara	11,063
North Queensland Cowboys	30 - 0	Penrith Panthers	6 April 2013, 6:30pm	1300SMILES Stadium	Adam Devcich; Chris James	12,431
St. George Illawarra Dragons	19 - 16	Newcastle Knights	7 April 2013, 3:00pm	WIN Jubilee Oval	Ben Cummins; Gavin Morris	14,226
New Zealand Warriors	22 - 24	South Sydney Rabbitohs	7 April 2013, 4:00pm	Mt Smart Stadium	Jared Maxwell; Dave Munro	13,513
Canberra Raiders	24 - 22	Sydney Roosters	7 April 2013, 6:30pm	Canberra Stadium	Matt Cecchin; Luke Phillips	10,969
Melbourne Storm	26 - 12	Wests Tigers	8 April 2013, 7:00pm	AAMI Park	Jason Robinson; Adam Gee	18,866

=== Round 6 ===
Home	Score	Away	Match information
Home	Score	Away	Date and time (Local)	Venue	Referees	Attendance
Brisbane Broncos	12 - 10	North Queensland Cowboys	12 April 2013, 7:35pm	Suncorp Stadium	Ashley Klein; Phil Haines	42,556
Sydney Roosters	38 - 0	Canterbury-Bankstown Bulldogs	12 April 2013, 7:35pm	Allianz Stadium	Ben Cummins; Gavin Morris	22,552
Newcastle Knights	8 - 6	Penrith Panthers	13 April 2013, 5:30pm	Hunter Stadium	Gavin Badger; Henry Perenara	15,536
Canberra Raiders	20 - 16	New Zealand Warriors	13 April 2013, 7:30pm	Canberra Stadium	Chris James; Adam Devcich	9,699
South Sydney Rabbitohs	10 - 17	Melbourne Storm	13 April 2013, 7:30pm	ANZ Stadium	Shayne Hayne; Alan Shortall	32,671
Manly-Warringah Sea Eagles	25 - 18	Cronulla-Sutherland Sharks	14 April 2013, 2:00pm	Brookvale Oval	Jared Maxwell; David Munro	17,504
Wests Tigers	12 - 13	St. George Illawarra Dragons	14 April 2013, 3:00pm	Sydney Cricket Ground	Matt Cecchin; Luke Phillips	21,844
Gold Coast Titans	28 - 22	Parramatta Eels	14 April 2013, 6:30pm	Skilled Park	Jason Robinson; Adam Gee	12,047

=== Round 7 ===
Home	Score	Away	Match information
Home	Score	Away	Date and time (Local)	Venue	Referees	Attendance
Sydney Roosters	34 - 10	St. George Illawarra Dragons	25 April 2013, 4:00pm	Allianz Stadium	Shayne Hayne; Gerard Sutton	40,752
Melbourne Storm	28 - 18	New Zealand Warriors	25 April 2013, 7:00pm	AAMI Park	Matt Cecchin; Henry Perenara	25,480
Manly-Warringah Sea Eagles	12 - 20	South Sydney Rabbitohs	26 April 2013, 7:45pm	Brookvale Oval	Phil Haines; Ashley Klein	20,510
North Queensland Cowboys	30 - 12	Canberra Raiders	27 April 2013, 5:30pm	1300SMILES Stadium	Ben Cummins; Gavin Morris	13,240
Wests Tigers	10 - 20	Brisbane Broncos	27 April 2013, 7:30pm	Campbelltown Sports Stadium	Gavin Badger; Alan Shortall	11,547
Gold Coast Titans	6 - 30	Newcastle Knights	28 April 2013, 2:00pm	Skilled Park	Jared Maxwell; Luke Phillips	14,201
Cronulla-Sutherland Sharks	8 - 24	Canterbury-Bankstown Bulldogs	28 April 2013, 3:00pm	Bluetongue Stadium	Chris James; Adam Devcich	10,131
Penrith Panthers	44 - 12	Parramatta Eels	29 April 2013, 7:00pm	Centrebet Stadium	Jason Robinson; Gavin Reynolds	14,211

=== Round 8 ===
Home	Score	Away	Match information
Home	Score	Away	Date and time (Local)	Venue	Referees	Attendance
Brisbane Broncos	12 - 26	South Sydney Rabbitohs	3 May 2013, 7:35pm	Suncorp Stadium	Shayne Hayne; Gerard Sutton	39,111
Canterbury-Bankstown Bulldogs	40 - 4	Wests Tigers	3 May 2013, 7:35pm	ANZ Stadium	Matt Cecchin; Henry Perenara	23,453
Melbourne Storm	20 - 24	Canberra Raiders	4 May 2013, 5:30pm	AAMI Park	Ashley Klein; Phil Haines	15,464
Parramatta Eels	10 - 14	North Queensland Cowboys	4 May 2013, 7:30pm	Parramatta Stadium	Adam Devcich; Chris James	9,157
New Zealand Warriors	25 - 24	Gold Coast Titans	5 May 2013, 2:00pm	Mt Smart Stadium	Jason Robinson; Gavin Reynolds	9,465
Newcastle Knights	20 - 21	Cronulla-Sutherland Sharks	5 May 2013, 2:00pm	Hunter Stadium	Gavin Badger; Alan Shortall	16,983
Sydney Roosters	30 - 6	Penrith Panthers	5 May 2013, 3:00pm	Allianz Stadium	Jared Maxwell; Luke Phillips	11,176
St. George Illawarra Dragons	18 - 24	Manly-Warringah Sea Eagles	6 May 2013, 7:00pm	WIN Jubilee Oval	Ben Cummins; Gavin Morris	11,607

=== Round 9 ===
Home	Score	Away	Match information
Home	Score	Away	Date and time (Local)	Venue	Referees	Attendance
South Sydney Rabbitohs	28 - 10	North Queensland Cowboys	10 May 2013, 7:35pm	ANZ Stadium	Jared Maxwell; Luke Phillips	15,972
Wests Tigers	6 - 30	Cronulla-Sutherland Sharks	10 May 2013, 7:35pm	Allianz Stadium	Ben Cummins; Phil Haines	9,858
New Zealand Warriors	16 - 24	Canterbury-Bankstown Bulldogs	11 May 2013, 7:30pm	Westpac Stadium	Adam Devcich; Chris James	30,112
Parramatta Eels	19 - 18	Brisbane Broncos	11 May 2013, 7:30pm	Parramatta Stadium	Gavin Reynolds; Ashley Klein	11,005
Canberra Raiders	44 - 14	Newcastle Knights	12 May 2013, 2:00pm	Canberra Stadium	Jason Robinson; Gavin Morris	10,453
Gold Coast Titans	15 - 14	St. George Illawarra Dragons	12 May 2013, 3:00pm	Skilled Park	Shayne Hayne; Gerard Sutton	12,117
Penrith Panthers	12 - 10	Melbourne Storm	12 May 2013, 6:30pm	Centrebet Stadium	Gavin Badger; Alan Shortall	7,803
Manly-Warringah Sea Eagles	4 - 16	Sydney Roosters	13 May 2013, 7:00pm	Brookvale Oval	Matt Cecchin; Henry Perenara	12,950

=== Round 10 ===
Home	Score	Away	Match information
Home	Score	Away	Date and time (Local)	Venue	Referees	Attendance
Brisbane Broncos	32 - 6	Gold Coast Titans	17 May 2013, 7:35pm	Suncorp Stadium	Ben Cummins; Phil Haines	34,596
South Sydney Rabbitohs	54 - 10	Wests Tigers	17 May 2013, 7:35pm	ANZ Stadium	Jared Maxwell; Luke Phillips	19,718
St. George Illawarra Dragons	32 - 12	Parramatta Eels	18 May 2013, 5:30pm	WIN Stadium	Gavin Badger; Alan Shortall	17,458
Penrith Panthers	62 - 6	New Zealand Warriors	18 May 2013, 7:30pm	Centrebet Stadium	Gerard Sutton; Henry Perenara	9,386
North Queensland Cowboys	8 - 12	Sydney Roosters	18 May 2013, 7:30pm	1300SMILES Stadium	Ashley Klein; Gavin Reynolds	13,660
Cronulla-Sutherland Sharks	30 - 20	Canberra Raiders	19 May 2013, 2:00pm	Sharks Stadium	Chris James; Adam Devcich	12,130
Newcastle Knights	44 - 8	Canterbury-Bankstown Bulldogs	19 May 2013, 3:00pm	Hunter Stadium	Gavin Morris; Jason Robinson	18,982
Melbourne Storm	10 - 10	Manly-Warringah Sea Eagles	20 May 2013, 7:00pm	AAMI Park	Matt Cecchin; Shayne Hayne	12,921

- The Warriors suffered their biggest loss and conceded their most points in a match, eclipsing the 54-0 defeat against St George Illawarra and the 58 points they conceded against the Roosters in 2000 and 2004 respectively, it was also Penrith's biggest score since 2004 and the highest score by any team since 2008.
- The West Tigers set a new club record for longest losing streak with their 7th straight loss, beating the previous record of 6 which happened twice before, the most recent of which in 2003 (and also, later on in the 2013 season).

=== Round 11 ===
Home	Score	Away	Match information
Home	Score	Away	Date and time (Local)	Venue	Referees	Attendance
Wests Tigers	22 - 20	North Queensland Cowboys	24 May 2013, 7:05pm	Leichhardt Oval	Gavin Marris; Jason Robinson	7,125
Canterbury-Bankstown Bulldogs	24 - 14	Brisbane Broncos	24 May 2013, 7:35pm	ANZ Stadium	Jared Maxwell; Henry Perenara	11,344
St. George Illawarra Dragons	0 - 19	Penrith Panthers	25 May 2013, 5:30pm	WIN Jubilee Oval	Chris James; Adam Devcich	10,922
Sydney Roosters	18 - 26	Melbourne Storm	25 May 2013, 7:30pm	Allianz Stadium	Shayne Hayne; Ashley Klein	19,164
Manly-Warringah Sea Eagles	16 - 10	Canberra Raiders	25 May 2013, 7:30pm	Brookvale Oval	Gavin Badger; Alan Shortall	10,871
New Zealand Warriors	28 - 12	Newcastle Knights	26 May 2013, 4:00pm	Mt Smart Stadium	Gerard Sutton; Luke Phillips	9,257
Parramatta Eels	4 - 42	Gold Coast Titans	26 May 2013, 3:00pm	Glen Willow Regional Sports Complex	Matt Cecchin; Gavin Reynolds	9,132
Cronulla-Sutherland Sharks	14 - 12	South Sydney Rabbitohs	27 May 2013, 7:00pm	Sharks Stadium	Ben Cummins; Brett Suttor	12,243

- The Gold Coast Titans scored their most points since coming back to the NRL in 2007, beating the 38 they scored in 2007, also against Parramatta.
- St George-Illawarra were held to nil at Kogarah for the first time in their history, and it was the first time any St George team was held to nil on the ground.

=== Round 12 ===
Home	Score	Away	Match information
Home	Score	Away	Date and time (Local)	Venue	Referees	Attendance
Canterbury-Bankstown Bulldogs	16 - 14	St. George Illawarra Dragons	31 May 2013, 7:45pm	ANZ Stadium	Jared Maxwell; Phil Haines	22,958
South Sydney Rabbitohs	25 - 18	Newcastle Knights	1 June 2013, 7:30pm	ANZ Stadium	Gavin Badger; Alan Shortall	13,225
Gold Coast Titans	31 - 12	North Queensland Cowboys	2 June 2013, 3:00pm	Skilled Park	Gerard Sutton; Gavin Reynolds	12,790
Brisbane Broncos	18 - 56	New Zealand Warriors	3 June 2013, 7:00pm	Suncorp Stadium	Ben Cummins; Brett Suttor	21,259
Bye: Canberra Raiders, Cronulla-Sutherland Sharks, Manly-Warringah Sea Eagles, Melbourne Storm, Parramatta Eels, Penrith Panthers, Sydney Roosters & Wests Tigers

- The Warriors scored 50+ for the first time since Round 15 2007.

=== Round 13 ===
Home	Score	Away	Match information
Home	Score	Away	Date and time (Local)	Venue	Referees	Attendance
Parramatta Eels	24 - 38	Sydney Roosters	7 June 2013, 7:45pm	Parramatta Stadium	Adam Devcich; Gavin Morris	12,135
Newcastle Knights	8 - 14	St. George Illawarra Dragons	8 June 2013, 5:30pm	Hunter Stadium	Jason Robinson; Henry Perenara	19,214
North Queensland Cowboys	26 - 36	Canterbury-Bankstown Bulldogs	8 June 2013, 7:30pm	1300SMILES Stadium	Matt Cecchin; Adam Gee	12,775
New Zealand Warriors	18 - 16	Manly-Warringah Sea Eagles	9 June 2013, 4:00pm	Mt Smart Stadium	Ben Cummins; Brett Suttor	11,142
Penrith Panthers	18 - 20	Wests Tigers	9 June 2013, 3:00pm	Centrebet Stadium	Jared Maxwell; Phil Haines	16,827
Melbourne Storm	38 - 6	Cronulla-Sutherland Sharks	9 June 2013, 6:30pm	AAMI Park	Chris James; Ashley Klein	16,231
Canberra Raiders	30 - 18	Brisbane Broncos	10 June 2013, 7:00pm	Canberra Stadium	Gerard Sutton; Luke Phillips	10,419
Bye: Gold Coast Titans & South Sydney Rabbitohs

=== Round 14 ===
Home	Score	Away	Match information
Home	Score	Away	Date and time (Local)	Venue	Referees	Attendance
St. George Illawarra Dragons	16 - 22	North Queensland Cowboys	14 June 2013, 7:35pm	WIN Stadium	Jared Maxwell; Phil Haines	9,035
Manly-Warringah Sea Eagles	30 - 32	Canterbury-Bankstown Bulldogs	14 June 2013, 7:35pm	Brookvale Oval	Shayne Hayne; Gavin Morris	12,157
Canberra Raiders	24 - 12	Penrith Panthers	15 June 2013, 5:30pm	Canberra Stadium	Ben Cummins; Adam Gee	9,176
Cronulla-Sutherland Sharks	32 - 14	Parramatta Eels	15 June 2013, 7:30pm	Sharks Stadium	Jason Robinson; Adam Devcich	11,055
South Sydney Rabbitohs	30 - 24	Gold Coast Titans	16 June 2013, 2:00pm	Barlow Park	Matt Cecchin; Grant Atkins	16,118
Melbourne Storm	16 - 14	Newcastle Knights	16 June 2013, 3:00pm	AAMI Park	Gerard Sutton; Henry Perenara	12,861
Sydney Roosters	12 - 23	New Zealand Warriors	16 June 2013, 6:30pm	Allianz Stadium	Chris James; Ashley Klein	11,040
Brisbane Broncos	32 - 12	Wests Tigers	17 June 2013, 7:00pm	Suncorp Stadium	Gavin Badger; Alan Shortall	21,399

=== Round 15 ===
Home	Score	Away	Match information
Home	Score	Away	Date and time (Local)	Venue	Referees	Attendance
Canterbury-Bankstown Bulldogs	18 - 20	Sydney Roosters	21 June 2013, 7:45pm	ANZ Stadium	Matt Cecchin; Gavin Badger	20,275
Wests Tigers	17 - 12	Canberra Raiders	22 June 2013, 7:30pm	Campbelltown Sports Stadium	Adam Devcich; Alan Shortall	7,833
Parramatta Eels	10 - 30	South Sydney Rabbitohs	23 June 2013, 3:00pm	ANZ Stadium	Gerard Sutton; Henry Perenara	17,077
Gold Coast Titans	18 - 12	Melbourne Storm	24 June 2013, 7:00pm	Skilled Park	Jared Maxwell; Gavin Atkins	13,044
Bye: Brisbane Broncos, Cronulla-Sutherland Sharks, Manly-Warringah Sea Eagles, Newcastle Knights, New Zealand Warriors, North Queensland Cowboys, Penrith Panthers & St. George Illawarra Dragons

=== Round 16 ===
Home	Score	Away	Match information
Home	Score	Away	Date and time (Local)	Venue	Referees	Attendance
South Sydney Rabbitohs	32 - 2	Canberra Raiders	28 June 2013, 7:45pm	ANZ Stadium	Ben Cummins; Chris James	11,167
Wests Tigers	22 - 4	Melbourne Storm	29 June 2013, 5:30pm	Leichhardt Oval	Jared Maxwell; Gavin Atkins	5,288
Penrith Panthers	25 - 10	St George Illawarra Dragons	29 June 2013, 7:30pm	Centrebet Stadium	Gavin Badger; Phil Haines	6,271
Newcastle Knights	46 - 16	Gold Coast Titans	30 June 2013, 2:00pm	Hunter Stadium	Shayne Hayne; Jason Robinson	9,208
New Zealand Warriors	18 - 16	Brisbane Broncos	30 June 2013, 4:00pm	Mt Smart Stadium	Gerard Sutton; Henry Perenara	15,515
North Queensland Cowboys	24 - 4	Cronulla-Sutherland Sharks	30 June 2013, 6:30pm	1300SMILES Stadium	Adam Devcich; Alan Shortall	14,434
Sydney Roosters	18 - 12	Manly-Warringah Sea Eagles	1 July 2013, 7:00pm	Allianz Stadium	Matt Cecchin; Gavin Morris	16,246
Bye: Canterbury-Bankstown Bulldogs & Parramatta Eels

- James McManus equalled the club try scoring record for Newcastle, joining Darren Albert, Adam MacDougall, Andrew Johns, Cooper Vuna and Akuila Uate as the only players to score 4 tries for the Knights.

=== Round 17 ===
Home	Score	Away	Match information
Home	Score	Away	Date and time (Local)	Venue	Referees	Attendance
Melbourne Storm	32 - 0	Brisbane Broncos	5 July 2013, 7:35pm	AAMI Park	Gerard Sutton; Luke Phillips	16,828
Cronulla-Sutherland Sharks	36 - 22	Wests Tigers	5 July 2013, 7:35pm	Remondis Stadium	Matt Cecchin; Ben Cummins	13,843
St. George Illawarra Dragons	0 - 36	Sydney Roosters	6 July 2013, 5:30pm	WIN Jubilee Oval	Adam Devcich; Chris James	11,857
Gold Coast Titans	18 - 40	Penrith Panthers	6 July 2013, 7:00pm	TIO Stadium	Alan Shortall; Henry Perenara	8,050
Canberra Raiders	26 - 18	North Queensland Cowboys	7 July 2013, 2:00pm	Canberra Stadium	Jason Robinson; Gavin Morris	10,515
Canterbury-Bankstown Bulldogs	12 - 18	Newcastle Knights	7 July 2013, 3:00pm	Virgin Australia Stadium	Shyane Hayne; Jared Maxwell	9,742
South Sydney Rabbitohs	30 - 13	New Zealand Warriors	7 July 2013, 4:30pm	nib Stadium	Ashley Klein; David Munro	20,221
Manly-Warringah Sea Eagles	50 - 10	Parramatta Eels	8 July 2013, 7:00pm	Brookvale Oval	Gavin Badger; Phil Haines	10,987

=== Round 18 ===
For this round, NRL players selected for Game III of the 2013 State of Origin series were not available to play.

Home	Score	Away	Match information
Home	Score	Away	Date and time (Local)	Venue	Referees	Attendance
Brisbane Broncos	18 - 19	Cronulla-Sutherland Sharks	12 July 2013, 7:45pm	Suncorp Stadium	Matt Cecchin; Luke Phillips	25,677
Parramatta Eels	10 - 17	Penrith Panthers	13 July 2013, 7:30pm	Parramatta Stadium	Jared Maxwell; Henry Perenara	9,327
Canterbury-Bankstown Bulldogs	39 - 0	Melbourne Storm	14 July 2013, 3:00pm	ANZ Stadium	Gerard Sutton; Alan Shortall	16,406
North Queensland Cowboys	14 - 34	Manly-Warringah Sea Eagles	15 July 2013, 7:00pm	1300SMILES Stadium	Ashley Klein; David Munro	9,029
Bye: Canberra Raiders, Gold Coast Titans, Newcastle Knights, New Zealand Warriors, South Sydney Rabbitohs, St. George Illawarra Dragons, Sydney Roosters & Wests Tigers

- Melbourne were held to nil for the first time since the 2008 Grand Final.

=== Round 19 ===
Home	Score	Away	Match information
Home	Score	Away	Date and time (Local)	Venue	Referees	Attendance
Wests Tigers	14 - 24	New Zealand Warriors	19 July 2013, 7:45pm	Leichhardt Oval	Gavin Badger; Luke Phillips	11,436
Canberra Raiders	14 - 0	Parramatta Eels	20 July 2013, 5:30pm	Canberra Stadium	Jason Robinson; Gavin Morris	7,023
Sydney Roosters	40 - 0	Cronulla-Sutherland Sharks	20 July 2013, 7:30pm	Allianz Stadium	Matt Cecchin; Henry Perenara	13,706
Penrith Panthers	14 - 32	Newcastle Knights	21 July 2013, 2:00pm	Centrebet Stadium	Ashley Klein; Adam Devcich	10,240
Manly-Warringah Sea Eagles	38 - 20	Gold Coast Titans	21 July 2013, 3:00pm	Brookvale Oval	Ben Cummins; Chris James	11,905
South Sydney Rabbitohs	18 - 22	St. George Illawarra Dragons	22 July 2013, 7:00pm	ANZ Stadium	Gerard Sutton; David Munro	14,571
Bye: Brisbane Broncos, Canterbury-Bankstown Bulldogs, Melbourne Storm & North Queensland Cowboys

=== Round 20 - Rivalry Round ===
Home	Score	Away	Match information
Home	Score	Away	Date and time (Local)	Venue	Referees	Attendance
North Queensland Cowboys	16 - 18	Brisbane Broncos	26 July 2013, 7:35pm	1300SMILES Stadium	Gerard Sutton; Gavin Atkins	17,702
Canterbury-Bankstown Bulldogs	40 - 12	Parramatta Eels	26 July 2013, 7:35pm	ANZ Stadium	Matt Cecchin; Gavin Reynolds	23,341
St. George Illawarra Dragons	18 - 22	Canberra Raiders	27 July 2013, 5:30pm	WIN Stadium	Alan Shortall; Chris James	12,072
Gold Coast Titans	4 - 32	South Sydney Rabbitohs	27 July 2013, 7:30pm	Skilled Park	Ashley Klein; Phil Haines	20,392
New Zealand Warriors	30 - 22	Melbourne Storm	28 July 2013, 2:00pm	Mt Smart Stadium	Ben Cummins; Henry Perenara	20,126
Cronulla-Sutherland Sharks	38 - 10	Penrith Panthers	28 July 2013, 2:00pm	Remondis Stadium	Shayne Hayne; Brett Suttor	14,120
Newcastle Knights	12 - 28	Sydney Roosters	28 July 2013, 3:00pm	Hunter Stadium	Jared Maxwell; Gavin Morris	22,846
Wests Tigers	18 - 36	Manly-Warringah Sea Eagles	29 July 2013, 7:00pm	Campbelltown Sports Stadium	Adam Devcich; Luke Phillips	11,162

=== Round 21 ===
Home	Score	Away	Match information
Home	Score	Away	Date and time (Local)	Venue	Referees	Attendance
Newcastle Knights	18 - 18	Brisbane Broncos	2 August 2013, 7:35pm	Hunter Stadium	Ben Cummins; Chris James	16,486
Penrith Panthers	6 - 42	Sydney Roosters	2 August 2013, 7:35pm	Centrebet Stadium	Shayne Hayne; Jason Robinson	11,879
New Zealand Warriors	14 - 18	Cronulla-Sutherland Sharks	3 August 2013, 5:00pm	Mt Smart Stadium	Matt Cecchin; Gavin Reynolds	15,209
Parramatta Eels	6 - 40	Manly-Warringah Sea Eagles	3 August 2013, 5:30pm	Parramatta Stadium	Ashley Klein; Phil Haines	11,232
North Queensland Cowboys	30 - 12	South Sydney Rabbitohs	3 August 2013, 7:30pm	1300SMILES Stadium	Adam Devcich; Luke Phillips	13,045
Canberra Raiders	4 - 68	Melbourne Storm	4 August 2013, 2:00pm	Canberra Stadium	Jared Maxwell; Gavin Morris	10,826
Gold Coast Titans	36 - 6	Wests Tigers	4 August 2013, 3:00pm	Skilled Park	Gavin Badger	11,731
St. George Illawarra Dragons	20 - 39	Canterbury-Bankstown Bulldogs	5 August 2013, 7:00pm	WIN Jubilee Oval	Gerard Sutton; Henry Perenara	12,846

- Brett Stewart scored his 131st career try in Manly's 40-6 win over Parramatta. This was also the 5,000th try scored by the Sea Eagles since joining the competition in 1947
- The Canberra Raiders suffered their biggest loss at the hands of the Melbourne Storm, losing 68-4, it was also Melbourne's equal-biggest win, equalling the 64-0 win against the Tigers in 2001.

=== Round 22 ===
Home	Score	Away	Match information
Home	Score	Away	Date and time (Local)	Venue	Referees	Attendance
Melbourne Storm	26 - 8	South Sydney Rabbitohs	9 August 2013, 7:35pm	AAMI Park	Ben Cummins; Matt Cecchin	21,244
Parramatta Eels	26 - 22	Wests Tigers	9 August 2013, 7:35pm	Parramatta Stadium	Henry Perenara; Grant Atkins	12,013
Sydney Roosters	28 - 22	Canberra Raiders	10 August 2013, 5:30pm	Allianz Stadium	Gavin Badger; Alan Shortall	13,223
Cronulla-Sutherland Sharks	14 - 18	Newcastle Knights	10 August 2013, 7:30pm	Remondis Stadium	Shayne Hayne; Chris James	11,358
Manly-Warringah Sea Eagles	27 - 12	New Zealand Warriors	11 August 2013, 2:00pm	Bluetongue Stadium	Jared Maxwell; Gavin Morris	12,090
Brisbane Broncos	26 - 24	St. George Illawarra Dragons	11 August 2013, 3:00pm	Suncorp Stadium	Jason Robinson; Gavin Reynolds	31,199
Penrith Panthers	4 - 36	North Queensland Cowboys	11 August 2013, 6:30pm	Centrebet Stadium	Gerard Sutton; Adam Gee	6,611
Canterbury-Bankstown Bulldogs	16 - 26	Gold Coast Titans	12 August 2013, 7:00pm	ANZ Stadium	Adam Devcich; Luke Phillips	10,373

=== Round 23 ===
Home	Score	Away	Match information
Home	Score	Away	Date and time (Local)	Venue	Referees	Attendance
Brisbane Broncos	22 - 12	Parramatta Eels	16 August 2013, 7:35pm	Suncorp Stadium	Adam Devcich; Gavin Badger	24,607
South Sydney Rabbitohs	22 - 10	Manly-Warringah Sea Eagles	16 August 2013, 7:35pm	Bluetongue Stadium	Shayne Hayne; Henry Perenara	20,060
Canberra Raiders	16 - 28	Canterbury-Bankstown Bulldogs	17 August 2013, 3:00pm	Canberra Stadium	Ashley Klein; Gavin Reynolds	11,847
North Queensland Cowboys	22 - 10	Gold Coast Titans	17 August 2013, 5:30pm	1300SMILES Stadium	Matt Cecchin; Alan Shortall	12,003
St. George Illawarra Dragons	18 - 22	Cronulla-Sutherland Sharks	17 August 2013, 7:30pm	WIN Stadium	Ben Cummins; Luke Phillips	11,853
New Zealand Warriors	24 - 28	Penrith Panthers	18 August 2013, 4:00pm	Mt Smart Stadium	Jason Robinson; Chris James	11,596
Newcastle Knights	10 - 23	Melbourne Storm	18 August 2013, 3:00pm	Hunter Stadium	Jared Maxwell; Brett Suttor	26,822
Wests Tigers	14 - 56	Sydney Roosters	19 August 2013, 7:00pm	Allianz Stadium	Gerard Sutton; Phil Haines	8,393

=== Round 24 ===
Home	Score	Away	Match information
Home	Score	Away	Date and time (Local)	Venue	Referees	Attendance
Penrith Panthers	28 - 12	Brisbane Broncos	23 August 2013, 7:35pm	Centrebet Stadium	Gavin Badger; Luke Phillips	8,817
South Sydney Rabbitohs	28 - 20	Canterbury-Bankstown Bulldogs	23 August 2013, 7:35pm	ANZ Stadium	Matt Cecchin; Gavin Reynolds	29,571
St. George Illawarra Dragons	18 - 34	Wests Tigers	24 August 2013, 3:00pm	Sydney Cricket Ground	Jason Robinson; Phil Haines	15,016
Gold Coast Titans	22 - 24	New Zealand Warriors	24 August 2013, 5:30pm	Skilled Park	Gerard Sutton; Jared Maxwell	15,786
North Queensland Cowboys	26 - 6	Newcastle Knights	24 August 2013, 7:30pm	1300SMILES Stadium	Shayne Hayne; Alan Shortall	12,208
Canberra Raiders	22 - 36	Manly-Warringah Sea Eagles	25 August 2013, 2:00pm	Canberra Stadium	Ben Cummins; Chris James	12,058
Melbourne Storm	64 - 4	Parramatta Eels	25 August 2013, 3:00pm	AAMI Park	Adam Devcich; Gavin Morris	13,728
Cronulla-Sutherland Sharks	32 - 22	Sydney Roosters	26 August 2013, 7:00pm	Remondis Stadium	Ashley Klein; Henry Perenara	11,418

- The Storm recorded their highest score and win at AAMI Park, after giving the Eels a 64-4 hiding, the loss all but handed the Eels their 2nd consecutive wooden spoon after the Tigers beat the Dragons the day before, which put the Tigers 3 wins clear of Parramatta with 2 games to play, the Dragons were only 2 wins clear of Parramatta at that point, but due to the differential gap between the 2 teams, it was almost impossible for them to receive it.
- This round ended the finals hopes of Brisbane and Canberra, the former losing to Penrith, who kept their slim finals hopes alive in and the process, the latter losing to Manly, who all but secured their place in the top 4 with the win.

=== Round 25 ===
Home	Score	Away	Match information
Home	Score	Away	Date and time (Local)	Venue	Referees	Attendance
Brisbane Broncos	18 - 26	Newcastle Knights	30 August 2013, 7:35pm	Suncorp Stadium	Ashley Klein; Chris James	27,601
Wests Tigers	18 - 32	South Sydney Rabbitohs	30 August 2013, 7:35pm	Allianz Stadium	Phil Haines; Henry Perenara	14,891
New Zealand Warriors	50 - 16	Canberra Raiders	31 August 2013, 5:00pm	Mt Smart Stadium	Gavin Badger; Alan Shortall	15,121
Canterbury-Bankstown Bulldogs	34 - 14	Penrith Panthers	31 August 2013, 5:30pm	ANZ Stadium	Gerard Sutton; Gavin Reynolds	15,313
Manly-Warringah Sea Eagles	28 - 8	Melbourne Storm	31 August 2013, 7:30pm	Brookvale Oval	Jared Maxwell; Adam Devcich	17,179
Cronulla-Sutherland Sharks	18 - 31	North Queensland Cowboys	1 September 2013, 2:00pm	Remondis Stadium	Shayne Hayne; Luke Phillips	15,313
Sydney Roosters	22 - 30	Gold Coast Titans	1 September 2013, 3:00pm	Allianz Stadium	Matt Cecchin; David Munro	17,542
Parramatta Eels	26 - 22	St. George Illawarra Dragons	2 September 2013, 7:00pm	Parramatta Stadium	Gavin Morris; Brett Suttor	8,910

- The Bulldogs ended the Panthers slim finals hopes, booking themselves in the finals at the same time, this meant only Titans and Warriors were the only teams with a chance to make the finals.

=== Round 26 ===
Home	Score	Away	Match information
Home	Score	Away	Date and time (Local)	Venue	Referees	Attendance
Brisbane Broncos	16 - 11	Canterbury-Bankstown Bulldogs	5 September 2013, 7:45pm	Suncorp Stadium	Gavin Badger; Alan Shortall	26,599
South Sydney Rabbitohs	12 - 24	Sydney Roosters	6 September 2013, 7:45pm	ANZ Stadium	Matt Cecchin; Ashley Klein	59,708
St. George Illawarra Dragons	19 - 10	New Zealand Warriors	7 September 2013, 3:00pm	WIN Stadium	Jared Maxwell; Henry Perenara	9,022
Melbourne Storm	23 - 22	Gold Coast Titans	7 September 2013, 5:30pm	AAMI Park	Shayne Hayne; Gavin Morris	13,826
North Queensland Cowboys	50 - 22	Wests Tigers	7 September 2013, 7:30pm	1300SMILES Stadium	Gerard Sutton; Gavin Reynolds	19,519
Manly-Warringah Sea Eagles	26 - 38	Penrith Panthers	8 September 2013, 2:00pm	Brookvale Oval	Adam Devcich; Phil Haines	12,090
Newcastle Knights	54 - 6	Parramatta Eels	8 September 2013, 3:00pm	Hunter Stadium	Ben Cummins; Luke Phillips	23,392
Canberra Raiders	18 - 38	Cronulla-Sutherland Sharks	8 September 2013, 7:00pm	Canberra Stadium	Chris James; Adam Gee	7,615

- The South Sydney-Sydney Roosters match drew the largest attendance for a standalone home and away game in the competition's history. This record was broken round 7, 2025.
- The final 8 was decided after the Titans-Storm match, after the Warriors had lost earlier in the day to the Dragons, the Titans had to beat Melbourne and hope the Tigers beat the Cowboys (which didn't end up happening) for them to make the 8, despite a strong effort from the Titans they eventually went down in Golden Point to Melbourne, meaning no team could get in or fall out of the 8 from this point on.

== Finals ==
Qualifying and elimination finals
14 Sep, Allianz Stadium
1	Sydney Roosters	4
4	Manly-Warringah Sea Eagles	0
14 Sep, Allianz Stadium
5	Cronulla-Sutherland Sharks	20
8	North Queensland Cowboys	18
15 Sep, ANZ Stadium
6	Canterbury-Bankstown Bulldogs	6
7	Newcastle Knights	22
13 Sep, ANZ Stadium
2	South Sydney Rabbitohs	20
3	Melbourne Storm	10

Semi-finals
Manly-Warringah Sea Eagles	24
Cronulla-Sutherland Sharks	18
Newcastle Knights	18
Melbourne Storm	16

Preliminary finals
Sydney Roosters	40
Newcastle Knights	14
Manly-Warringah Sea Eagles	30
South Sydney Rabbitohs	20

Grand final
Sydney Roosters	26
Manly-Warringah Sea Eagles	18

=== Week 1 - Qualifying and Elimination Finals ===
1st Qualifying Final

Friday, 13 September
7:45pm

South Sydney Rabbitohs	20 - 10	Melbourne Storm
3 Tries: Dylan Farrell; Jeff Lima; Issac Luke; 4 Goals: Adam Reynolds		2 Tries: Will Chambers; Billy Slater 1 Goal: Cameron Smith

ANZ Stadium, Sydney
Attendance: 21,609
Referee: Shayne Hayne & Jared Maxwell

1st Elimination Final

Saturday, 14 September
4:00pm

Cronulla-Sutherland Sharks	20 - 18	North Queensland Cowboys
4 Tries: S Feki; Ben Pomeroy; Beau Ryan; Sam Tagataese; 2 Goals: Michael Gordon		3 Tries: Brent Tate; Jason Taumalolo; Wayne Ulugia 3 Goals: Johnathan Thurston

Allianz Stadium, Sydney
Attendance: 32747
Referee: Matt Cecchin & Henry Perenara

- This was the first meeting between these 2 teams in the finals

2nd Qualifying Final

Saturday, 14 September
7:00pm

Sydney Roosters	4 - 0	Manly-Warringah Sea Eagles
1 Try: Roger Tuivasa-Sheck

Allianz Stadium, Sydney
Attendance: 32,747
Referee: Gerard Sutton and Ben Cummins

- This was the first meeting between these 2 sides in the finals since 1997

2nd Elimination Final

Sunday, 15 September
4:00pm

Canterbury-Bankstown Bulldogs	6 - 22	Newcastle Knights
1 Try: Sam Perrett 1 Goal: Trent Hodkinson		3 Tries: Darius Boyd; Jeremy Smith; Akuila Uate; 5 Goals: Tyrone Roberts (5)

ANZ Stadium, Sydney
Attendance: 23,086
Referee: Gavin Badger & Ashley Klein

=== Week 2 - Semi-finals ===
1st Semi-final

Friday, 20 September
7:45pm

Manly-Warringah Sea Eagles	24 - 18	Cronulla-Sutherland Sharks
4 Tries: Daly Cherry-Evans; Kieran Foran; Jorge Taufua; Anthony Watmough; 4 Goals: Jamie Lyon		3 Tries: Andrew Fifita; Michael Gordon; Jonathan Wright 3 Goals: Michael Gordon

Allianz Stadium, Sydney
Attendance: 23,837
Referee: Shayne Hayne & Ashley Klein

- This was the first time since 1996 these 2 teams played against each other in a final

2nd Semi-final

Saturday, 21 September
7:45pm

Melbourne Storm	16 - 18	Newcastle Knights
3 Tries: Maurice Blair; Jesse Bromwich; Sisa Waqa; 2 Goals: Cameron Smith		3 Tries: Matt Hilder; Chris Houston; Akuila Uate; 3 Goals: Tyrone Roberts

AAMI Park, Melbourne
Attendance: 19,649
Referee: Gerard Sutton and Ben Cummins

=== Week 3 - Preliminary Finals ===
1st Preliminary Final

Friday, 27 September
7:45pm

South Sydney Rabbitohs	20 - 30	Manly-Warringah Sea Eagles
3 Tries: John Sutton; Nathan Merritt; Dylan Walker 4 Goals: Adam Reynolds (3); Issac Luke		5 Tries: Brett Stewart; Matt Ballin; Jamie Lyon; David Williams; Tom Symonds; 5 Goals: Jamie Lyon

ANZ Stadium, Sydney
Attendance: 44,546
Referee: Gerard Sutton and Ben Cummins

2nd Preliminary Final

Saturday, 28 September
7:45pm

Sydney Roosters	40 - 14	Newcastle Knights
7 Tries: Aidan Guerra (2); Michael Jennings (2); Mitchell Aubusson; Jake Friend; Daniel Tupou; 6 Goals: James Maloney		2 Tries: Joseph Leilua 3 Goals: Tyrone Roberts

Allianz Stadium, Sydney
Attendance: 37,752
Referee: Shayne Hayne & Ashley Klein

- This was the first time since 2003 that these 2 teams played off in a final.

=== Week 4 - Grand Final ===
Sunday, 6 October
7:15pm

Sydney Roosters	26 - 18	Manly-Warringah Sea Eagles
4 Tries: Daniel Tupou; Aidan Guerra; Shaun Kenny-Dowall; Michael Jennings; 5 Goals: James Maloney		3 Tries: Jorge Taufua; Jamie Lyon; Steve Matai 3 Goals: Jamie Lyon

ANZ Stadium, Sydney
Attendance: 81,491
Referee: Shayne Hayne & Ben Cummins

- Daly Cherry-Evans became the 3rd man (and the first in 20 years) to win the Clive Churchill medal despite being on the losing side, the other 2 were Brad Clyde for Canberra in 1991 and Brad Mackay in 1993 for St George.
- The Roosters were playing in their first Grand Final since 2010 where they went down to the Dragons 32-8, the Sea Eagles in their first since 2011, where they beat the Warriors 24-10, it was the 2nd time these teams had played off in a Grand Final, the other being in 1972, which Manly won 19-14.
- For the first time since 2005, the 2 Grand Finalists had played each other in the Finals before the Grand Final, having played each other in week one of the Finals in the 4-0 epic.
