= Magic Round (NRL) =

Rugby league weekend in which all fixtures are played at one venue

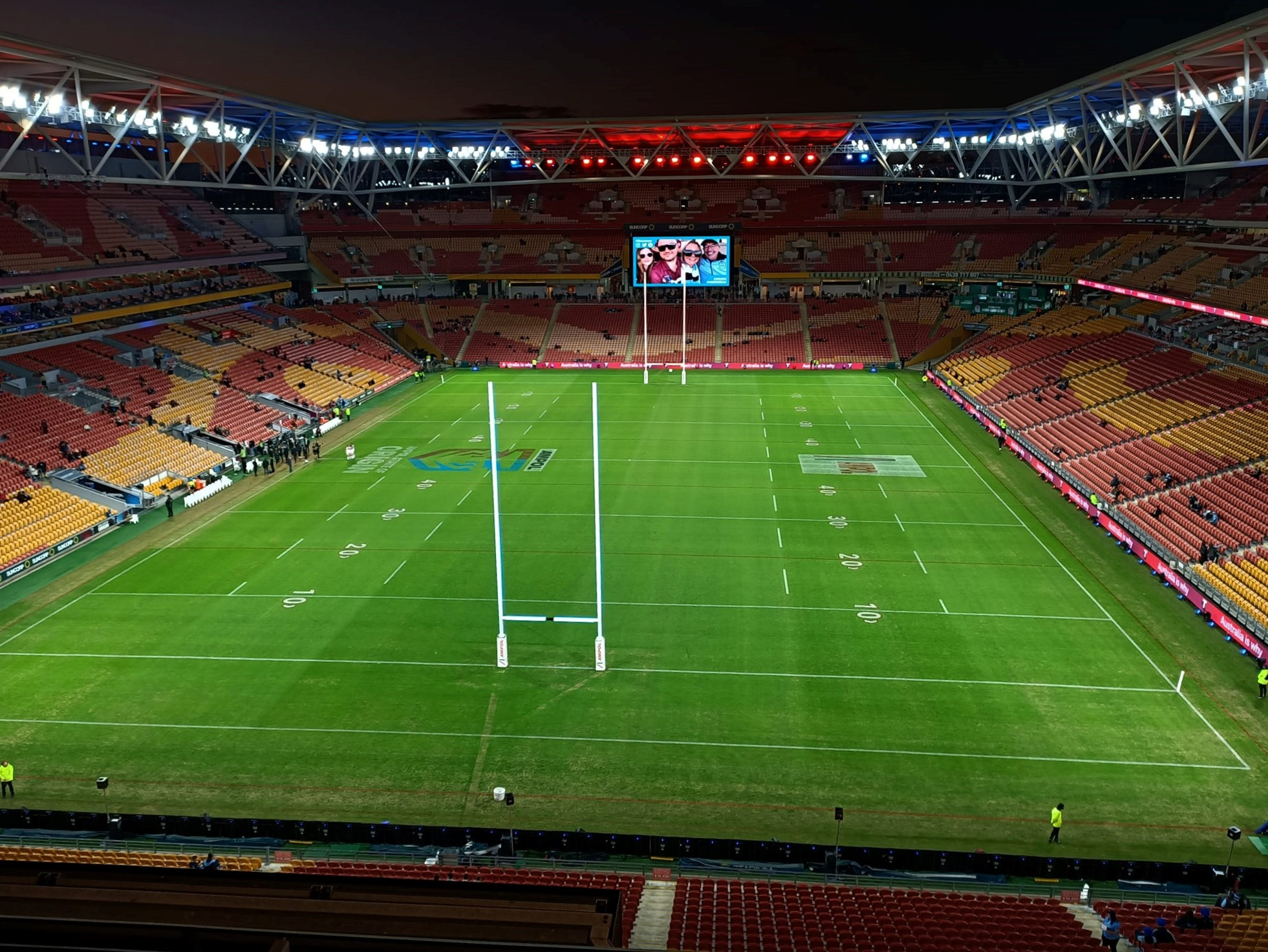
Suncorp Stadium, the host stadium of the Magic Round

The National Rugby League's Magic Round is a weekend in which all fixtures are played at one venue in Australia. The concept is derived from Super League's Magic Weekend. The first Magic Round, in 2019, was held at Brisbane's Lang Park, in the ninth round of the season, from 9 to 12 May. The Government of Queensland paid approximately $2.1 million per year for the event to be held in the city in 2019 and 2020.

== History ==
England's Super League first held its Magic Weekend in Cardiff, Wales, in 2007, in part as a bid to promote rugby league there. The event has been repeated on an annual basis, staged also in Edinburgh, Manchester, Newcastle upon Tyne and Liverpool. The second-tier Championship followed in 2015 with the Summer Bash, a full round of fixtures that in that year and each subsequent year have been played in Blackpool.

The NRL first announced a Magic Round in 2018, for the 2019 season. It selected Brisbane as the host for 2019 and 2021, with the NRL having the option to continue to hold the event there in 2022 and 2023. The hosting arrangements included an investment from the Government of Queensland. The NRL declared the 2019 event, held from 9 to 12 May, to be a success; the total attendance for the weekend was 134,677.

The second Magic Round was scheduled to be held in May 2020, but was cancelled due to the ongoing impact of the COVID-19 pandemic which affected the 2020 NRL season.

After the success of the second Magic Round in 2021, it was announced that the event would be returning to Brisbane in 2022. After continued success in Brisbane in the following seasons, a new three-year contract was awarded to keep the round in Brisbane to at least the 2027 season.

== Attendances ==
Year	City	Stadium	Days	Total attendance	Average daily attendance
2019	Brisbane	Suncorp Stadium	4	134,677	33,669
2020	Brisbane	Suncorp Stadium	Cancelled due to the COVID-19 pandemic.		
2021	Brisbane	Suncorp Stadium	3	▼130,019	▲43,340
2022	Brisbane	Suncorp Stadium	3	▲130,122	▲43,374
2023	Brisbane	Suncorp Stadium	3	▲147,105	▲49,035
2024	Brisbane	Suncorp Stadium	3	▲149,196	▲49,732
2025	Brisbane	Suncorp Stadium	3	▲149,326	▲49,775
2026	Brisbane	Suncorp Stadium	3	▼148,661	▼49,554
2027	Brisbane	Suncorp Stadium			
2028	Brisbane	Suncorp Stadium			
2029	Brisbane	Suncorp Stadium			
2030	Brisbane	Suncorp Stadium			
2031	Brisbane	Suncorp Stadium			
2032	Brisbane	Suncorp Stadium			

== See also ==
- Gather Round, the equivalent event in the Australian Football League since 2023
- Super Round, the equivalent event in the Super Rugby Pacific since 2022
- Unite Round, the equivalent event in the A-League Men and women since 2024
