= Grant Atkins =

Australian rugby league referee

Personal information
- Full name: Grant Phillip Atkins
- Born: 3 April 1982 (age 44)

Refereeing information
Years	Competition	Apps
2011–	National Rugby League	314
- Source: rugbyleagueproject.org

Grant Phillip Atkins (born 3 April 1982) is an Australian rugby league referee. He has refereed in the top-tier National Rugby League since 2011, and has also controlled many finals and representative matches.

== Early life and education ==
Atkins is the son of former player Graeme Atkins. He completed a Bachelor of Arts (Communication Studies) and a Bachelor of Teaching (Secondary) at the University of Western Sydney, followed by a Master of Communications through Griffith University.

From 2004 to 2010, Atkins taught at McCarthy Catholic College, Emu Plains. In 2011, he was a transition liaison officer for Catholic Education, Parramatta. Since 2012, Atkins has been a full-time rugby league referee.

In 2016, Atkins recorded and broadcast a podcast series Pride of the West, interviewing Western Sydney identities such as Pat Cummins, Mark Geyer, Chris Bath, Paige Hadley and Jason Dundas.

In 2023, Atkins was awarded an academic blue by the Australian Catholic University, which recognised the achievement of the university’s student athletes who succeeded at the top of their fields while meeting and exceeding academic standards. Atkins had refereed top-level rugby league while studying for a graduate certificate in high performance sports leadership.

== Refereeing career ==
=== Penrith Junior League ===
Atkins began refereeing in Penrith District Rugby League in 1997 and was awarded as the most improved junior referee that year, at age 15. He went on to referee their A-grade grand finals in 2004 and 2005. Atkins was awarded life membership in 2018.

=== New South Wales Rugby League ===
Atkins was promoted to the NSWRL Referees Association in 2007.

=== National Rugby League ===
Atkins controlled his first NRL match on 26 August 2011, between Parramatta Eels and Sydney Roosters. He refereed top-grade matches every year since to the present, being a regular NRL referee since 2014. Atkins has been appointed to eleven matches in the NRL end-of-season finals matches, and served as a bunker review official in State of Origin series and in the NRL Grand Finals of 2021 and 2022.

Atkins' representative appointments include City vs Country Origin in 2016, Indigenous All Stars in 2015, 2017 and 2019, and Australia versus Samoa in 2023.

Atkins refereed the 2025 NRL Grand Final.

==== Controversies ====
Atkins has been involved in some unusual situations while controlling games, including retrieval of a mobile phone dropped by a streaker and accidentally tripping a defending player.

Despite calls for its removal, Atkins has defended the role of the bunker in supporting referees to make the correct decision. In an interview with Fox Sports, Atkins said referees make over 8500 passive decisions per game, but make only five or six errors per game.

== Further listening ==
- Knell, Tristan (18 January 2019). "Episode 116 - Grant Atkins". talkingwithtk.
