= Adam Gee (referee) =

Australian rugby league referee

Personal information
- Born: 31 May 1985 (age 41)

Refereeing information
Years	Competition	Apps
2011–	NRL	237
2019–	Internationals (outside WC)	1
2017–	World Cup	3
2021–	All Stars	2

Adam Gee is an Australian rugby league referee. He officiates in the National Rugby League.

== Referee career ==
Gee began refereeing in the Canterbury-Bankstown District when he was fourteen. He secured his first A grade appointment in 2004 and controlled two successive A grade Grand Finals in 2004 and 2005. He was graded by the NSWRL Referees Association in 2007.

Gee refereed his first National Rugby League match in 2011 and was established as a regular first grade referee by 2014.

He was announced as one of the match officials at the 2017 Rugby League World Cup, and controlled a match between Papua New Guinea and the United States. He controlled the final of the 2017 Women's Rugby League World Cup.

Gee also refereed the 2021 and 2022 all stars games. He was in the bunker for the 2023 match.

Gee was appointed to referee his first NRL grand final, between the Penrith Panthers and Brisbane Broncos, on 1 October 2023 at Stadium Australia.
