= Gerard Sutton (referee) =

Australian rugby league referee (born 1978)

Personal information
- Full name: Gerard Sutton
- Born: 23 October 1978 (age 47) Coonabarabran, Australia
- Height: 182 cm (6 ft 0 in)
- Weight: 83.5 kg (184 lb; 13 st 2 lb)

Refereeing information
Years	Competition	Apps
2009–	NRL	429
2012–14	City vs Country	2
2014–21	State of Origin	20
2014–19	Tests	13
- Source: Rugby League Project As of 28 April 2026

Gerard Sutton (born 23 October 1978) is an Australian rugby league referee from Coonabarabran, New South Wales, Australia. He officiates in the National Rugby League.

== Rugby league career ==
Sutton made his National Rugby League debut in 2009. He has controlled City vs Country Origin games in 2012 and 2014, the 2014 World Club Challenge and matches in the 2014, 2015, 2016, 2017, 2018, 2019, 2020 and 2021 State of Origin series. Internationally, Sutton controlled matches in the 2014 and 2016 Rugby League Four Nations and the 2015 and 2016 Anzac Tests. He was in the match officials squad for the 2017 Rugby League World Cup of which he officiated the 2017 Rugby League World Cup final. Sutton also refereed the 2014, 2015, 2017, 2018, 2019, 2020 and 2021 NRL Grand Finals.
