= Joseph-Aukuso Sua'ali'i =

Australian rugby union & former Samoan international rugby league footballer

Joseph Sua'ali'i
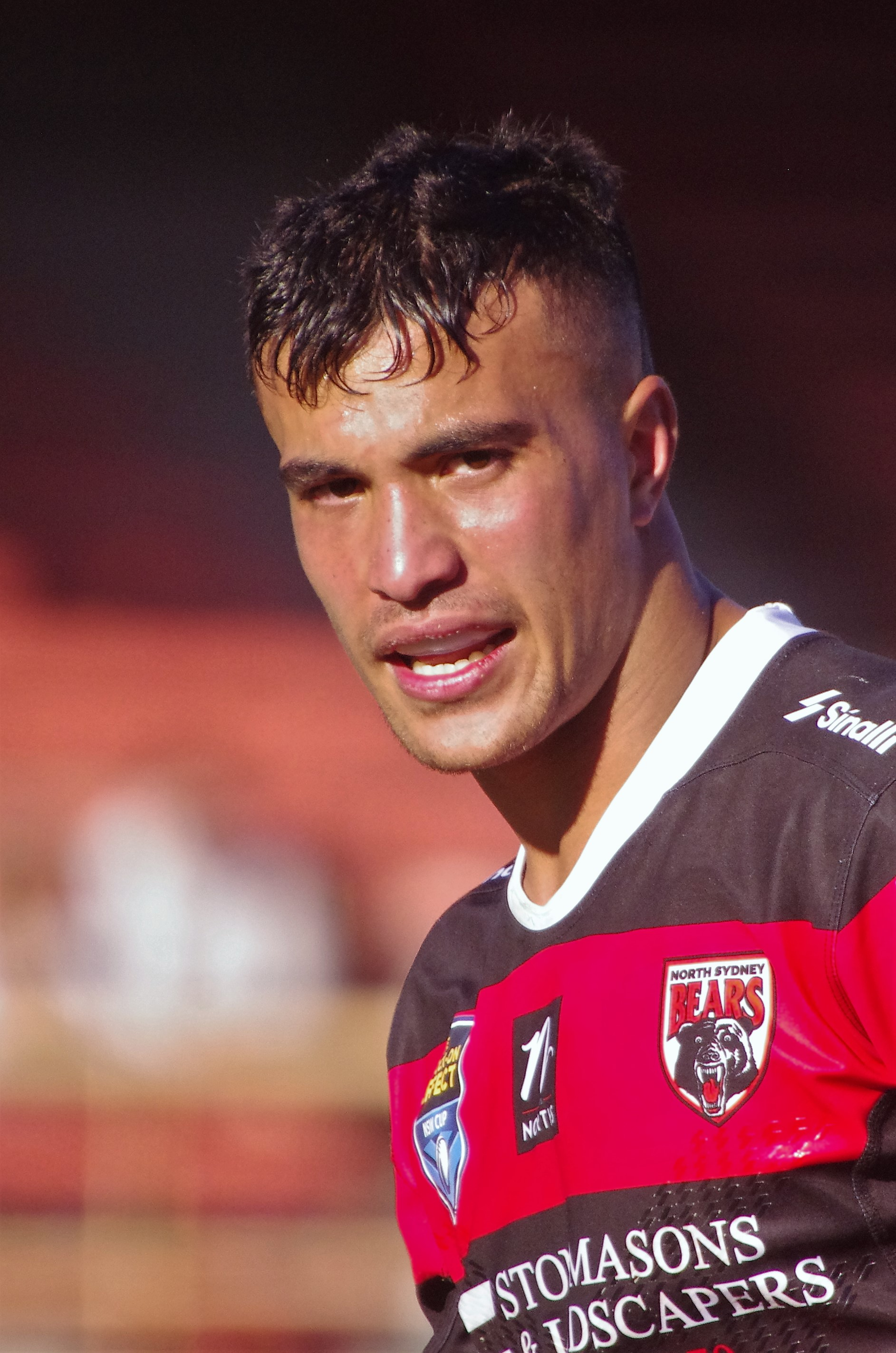
- Sua'ali'i in 2021

Personal information
- Full name: Joseph-Aukuso Sua'ali'i
- Born: 1 August 2003 (age 23) Glenmore Park, New South Wales, Australia
- Height: 1.96 m (6 ft 5 in)
- Weight: 98 kg (15 st 6 lb)

Playing information

Rugby league
- Position: Wing, Centre, Fullback
Club
Years	Team	Pld	T	G	FG	P
2021–24	Sydney Roosters	66	29	75	0	266
Representative
Years	Team	Pld	T	G	FG	P
2022	Samoa	6	0	0	0	0
2024	New South Wales	1	0	0	0	0

Rugby union
- Position: Centre, Wing, Fullback
Club
Years	Team	Pld	T	G	FG	P
2025–	Waratahs	12	2	0	0	10
Representative
Years	Team	Pld	T	G	FG	P
2019	Australian Schoolboys	1	2	0	0	10
2024–	Australia	27	4	0	0	20
- Source: As of 17 October 2026

Joseph-Aukuso Sua'ali'i (Samoan: Anavaotaua Iosefa Aukuso Suaali’i; born 1 August 2003) is an Australian rugby union footballer who plays for the New South Wales Waratahs in Super Rugby and the Australia national rugby team. He previously played rugby league as a winger or centre for the Sydney Roosters in the National Rugby League (NRL), for New South Wales and for Samoa at international level.

Described as a teen prodigy, Sua'ali'i received significant media attention during contract negotiations in 2020 as well as during his announcement in March 2023 of switching to rugby union starting in 2025. In 2021, he was granted an exemption to play in the NRL prior to his 18th birthday, prompting discussions about the welfare of young players.

== Early life and background ==
Sua'ali'i was born in Penrith and lived in Glenmore Park, a western suburb of Sydney, New South Wales. He is the son of a Samoan father and an Australian mother of Cambodian and European heritage. His father immigrated to Australia from Samoa at age 12 or 13, and his maternal grandfather came to Australia from Cambodia around age 20 or 21, remaining due to the Vietnam War. His parents met at Kingswood train station.

He grew up playing rugby league for the Glenmore Park Brumbies and then moved to the Coogee Wombats from age 12. Sua'ali'i attended Regentville Public School and attended The King's School, Parramatta. In Year 6 of primary school, he was selected for representative teams in rugby league, rugby union, basketball, athletics, and Australian Rules Football (AFL), and was in contention for touch football.

Former Sydney Swans coach John Longmire scouted Sua'ali'i when he represented the under-12 New South Wales Australian rules football state team and believed he would have been a superstar in the AFL if he had continued with the sport. Joseph set the Australian 12-year-old male high jump record in 2015. Sua'ali'i expressed a desire to attend The King's School after training there in Year 6. He enrolled in his local high school before being offered a last-minute scholarship to The King's School for Year 7, following a recommendation from Will Penisini's family. At The King's School, Sua'ali'i played first-grade basketball in Year 7 and first-grade rugby union in Year 9. He is the nephew of Samoan Australian boxer Paulo Aokuso.

== Rugby league career ==
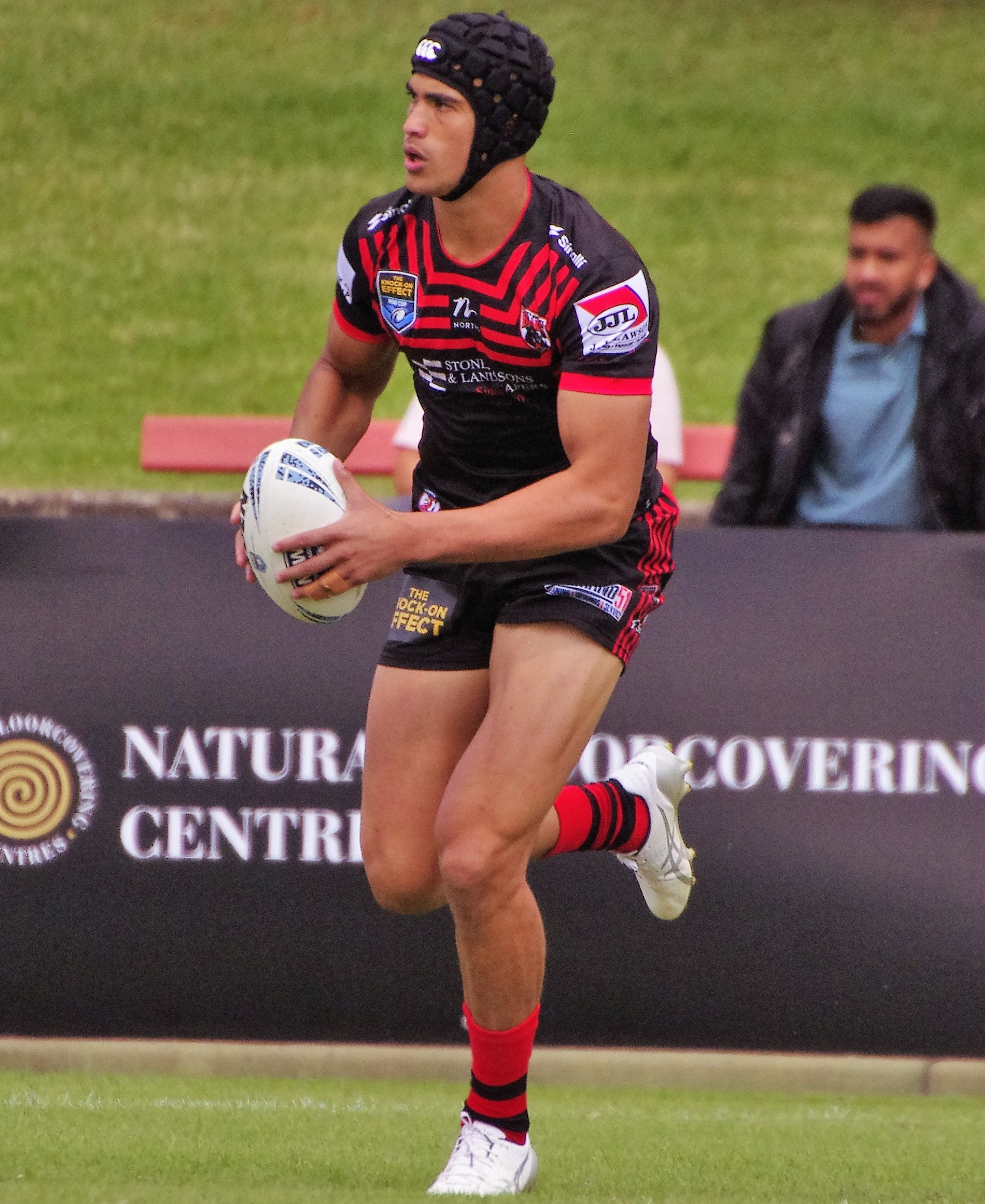
Sua'ali'i playing for the North Sydney Bears in 2021

In 2018, Sua'ali'i played rugby league for the South Sydney Rabbitohs in the Harold Matthews Cup (under 16s). He played rugby union as a fullback for The King's School's 1st XV from the age of 14, and in 2018 was selected to represent the GPS 1st XV, and the NSW Schoolboys and Australian Schoolboys in rugby sevens.

In February 2019, Sua'ali'i re-signed with the Rabbitohs until the end of the 2021 season. He captained the Harold Matthews Cup team in 2019, scoring fifteen tries in nine matches, and was named the Harold Matthews Cup Player of the Year.

Conflicting reports in mid-2020 suggested that Sua'ali'i had agreed to a multi-million dollar contract with either the Rabbitohs, or Rugby Australia, which they denied. In discussions with both those enitities, Sua'ali'i reportedly wanted 'get out' clauses available in his favour.

=== Sydney Roosters ===
In November 2020, it was reported that the Sydney Roosters had signed Sua'ali'i from 2022 onwards, with the 'get out' clauses having been accepted by the club. The signing was officially announced on 1 December, with Sua'ali'i joining the Roosters effective immediately after he was released from the final year of his Rabbitohs contract.

==== 2021 ====
Sua'ali'i made his debut for North Sydney Bears in round one of the 2021 NSW Cup season. Sua'ali'i scored two tries in North Sydney's 48–20 loss to the Blacktown Workers Sea Eagles.

On 15 March 2021, the ARL Commission granted Sua'ali'i an exemption to play in the NRL before turning 18-years-old. Sua'ali'i made his NRL debut on 22 May 2021, playing at centre for the Sydney Roosters in their round eleven loss to the Brisbane Broncos. At age 17 years and 294 days, Sua'ali'i was the first player since Jason Taumalolo in 2010 to debut prior to their 18th birthday. Sua'ali'i scored his first NRL try the following week as the Sydney Roosters defeated the Canberra Raiders in round twelve. Sua'ali'i played in the Roosters' next three fixtures (Gold Coast Titans, Penrith Panthers, Melbourne Storm), winning one and losing two. Following the Roosters' heavy round sixteen defeat to the Melbourne Storm, Sua'ali'i did not play again for the remainder of the season, as, announced on 13 July 2021, he had accrued a foot injury.

==== 2022 ====
Sua'ali'i was absent from the first five rounds of the 2022 NRL season from a foot (lisfranc) injury. Following round four, Sua'ali'i said “My foot is going well, feeling good. I've been making sure I've been looking after it and doing everything I can to stay on top of it. I'm happy here learning the game. But there's no rush. I'm just trying to go game-by-game.” After sitting out for another round, Sua'ali'i re-appeared for the Roosters in round six against the New Zealand Warriors. Sua'ali'i scored his first try of the season in round eight against the Canterbury-Bankstown Bulldogs in a 16–12 loss.

In rounds nine and ten, Sua'ali'i continued his attacking form from the previous round, scoring four tries over the next two fixtures: a double in a 44–16 win over the Gold Coast Titans, and, in incredible fashion, a double in a 31–24 victory over the Parramatta Eels. Between rounds eleven and sixteen managed to score four tries, with the Roosters only managing to get one win from six games. Up to round sixteen the Sydney Roosters were in poor form, sitting tenth on the Premiership ladder. However, statistically Sua'ali'i was fairing very well. He had ten tries (one assist), he averaged 131 run metres, 27.5 kick return metres, 5.6 tackles (62 total), 3.2 tackle breaks (35 total), and had eight linebreaks.

From round eighteen until the second-last round (twenty-four), Sua'ali'i, and the Sydney Roosters, were outstanding. Sua'ali'i scored six tries in a seven match win-streak, to finish the season in sixth place. Regarded as the league's "in form" team, Cronulla-Sutherland Sharks was the only other team to have won their last five matches by seasons end. Sua’ali’i ended his second NRL season as the Dally M Winger of the Year.

==== 2023 ====
In round one of the 2023 NRL season, the Sydney Roosters played away against the newly-entered team the Dolphins. Sua'ali'i scored the first try of the match, however the Roosters lost 18–28 at Lang Park, Brisbane.

In Anzac Round against St George Illawarra Dragons Sua'ali'i kicked his first NRL goal. He played 21 matches for the Sydney Roosters in the 2023 NRL season as the club finished 7th on the table and qualified for the finals. He played in both of the clubs finals games as they were eliminated in the second week against Melbourne.

==== 2024 ====
On 26 May, he was named at centre for New South Wales ahead of game one in the 2024 State of Origin series. During Game 1, Sua'ali'i was sent off for a high hit on Queensland fullback Reece Walsh seven minutes into the game. Sua'ali'i became only the sixth player in Origin history to be sent off. New South Wales went on to lose the match 38-10. Sua'ali'i was subsequently charged with a grade two reckless high tackle offence. Sua'ali'i was later suspended for four weeks over the incident.

=== International rugby league ===
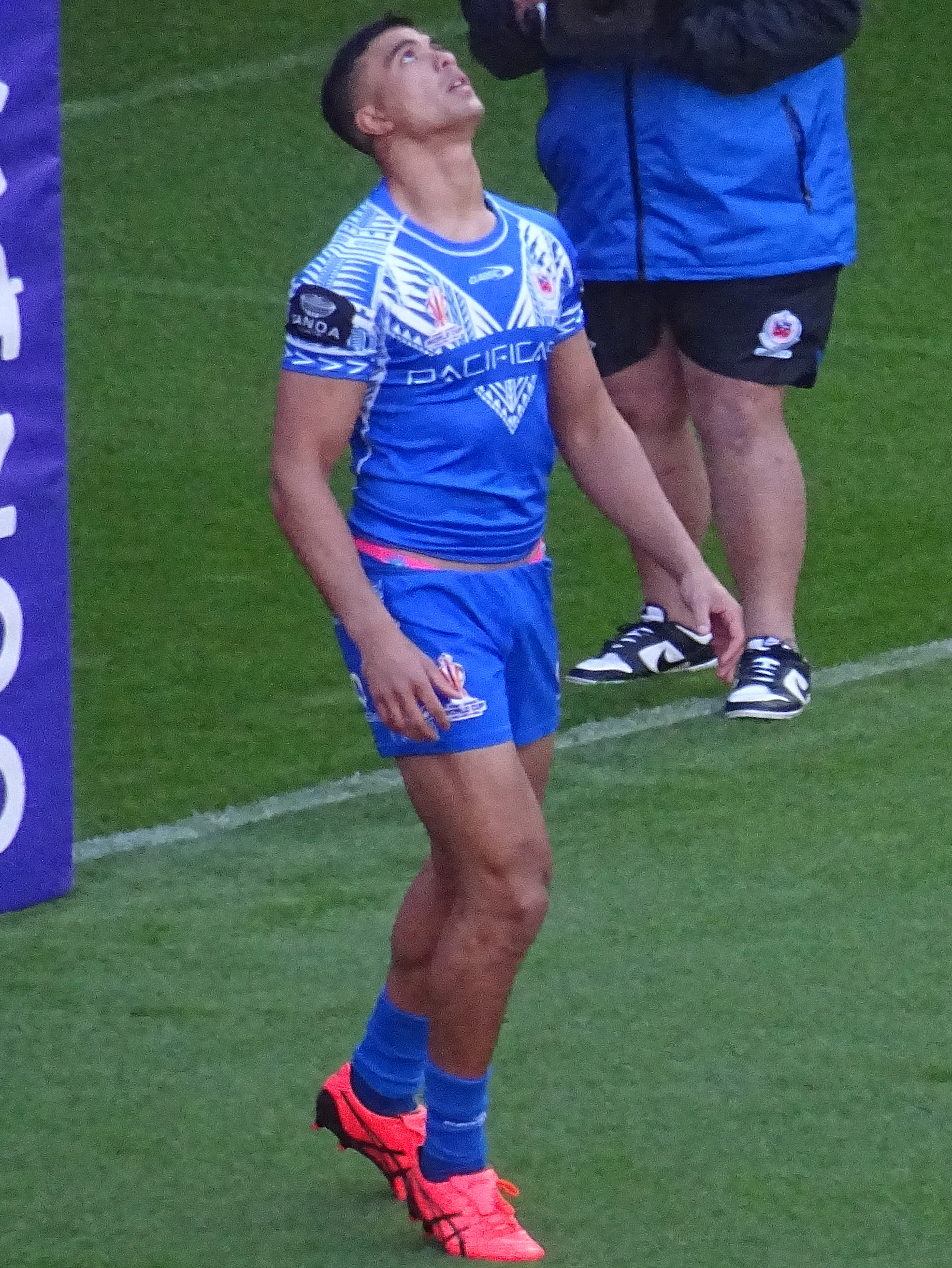
Sua'ali'i playing for Samoa in 2022

Being born in Australia with a Samoan parent, Sua'ali'i was eligible to represent either Australia or Samoa at international level.

Samoa coach Matt Parish, in late August, called Sua'ali'i to sway his opinion on playing for Samoa. Weeks later, and a month before the 2021 Rugby League World Cup, Sua'ali'i responded to the call-up stating his intentions to play for Samoa. In late September 2022, he was named in the Samoa squad.

Sua'ali'i played every minute of Samoa's 2021 Rugby League World Cup campaign, in which they started in Pool A against hosts England. Samoa lost by fifty-four points. Although Sua'ali'i did not score in Samoa's second Group match against Greece, he helped with a try assist in a 72–4 victory. Getting another try assist in Samoa's third Group fixture against France, Samoa won four straight matches and advanced to the Final against Australia, losing 30–10.

== Rugby union career ==
In late August 2022, it was reported that Sua'ali'i was being heavily pursued by Rugby Australia (RA) in an attempt to have him "switch codes" to play rugby union for an alleged A$10 million over five years (A$2 million p/y). It was originally cited a month prior (July 2022) that RA had a number of NRL players in their sights to target before the 2027 Rugby World Cup to be hosted on home soil. Although the reports were confirmed by Rugby Australia Chairman Hamish McLennan, he denied the price-tag associated with Sua'ali'i as being “fanciful”. Following the moves on Sua'ali'i by Rugby Australia, Australian Rugby League Commission (ARLC) Commissioner Peter V'landys criticised RA, stating: “[rugby union is] boring, slow and [a] hard-to-watch game.” He added: “I don’t think Sua'ali'i would go to rugby because he would be bored.”

On 25 March 2023 (round four of the 2023 NRL season), it was announced that Sua'ali'i had signed with Rugby Australia (RA) to switch codes and play for the New South Wales Waratahs and Australia starting from 2025. Although not confirmed, it was reported that Sua'ali'i's contract was between A$1.5 and A$1.6 million per year until the end of 2027. The signing of Sua'ali'i by Rugby Australia came just a few weeks after Sua'ali'i activated a clause in his contract with the Sydney Roosters to stay until the end of the 2024 NRL season, turning down a possible A$2.7–2.8 million dollar offer from rival NRL club the South Sydney Rabbitohs.

Sua'ali'i stated that his primary motivation for switching to rugby union was a long-held ambition to play in a British & Irish Lions tour (scheduled for 2025) and participate in a home Rugby World Cup (scheduled for 2027).

Sua'ali'i's move was very high-profile, being compared to former rugby league and rugby union players Israel Folau, Sonny Bill Williams, and Lote Tuqiri. The move received both criticism and support from various individuals involved in the NRL and rugby union, including former rugby league player and coach Phil Gould who said on Nine's 100% Footy: “Go now. Don't let the door hit you on the arse on the way out. Go. Go now. Gone. He's made his decision. You sign a contract for rugby 18 months before his league contract ends.” Brandon Smith, a teammate of Sua'ali'i, quipped upon learning of his move: “Super stoked for him, he's an amazing talent and rugby really got a gem there, [but] a $1.6 million winger from the Roosters isn't going to help you beat the All Blacks. Like Peter V'landys said, go over, get that easy money and then come back to the real sport.” ARLC Commissioner Peter V'landys, speaking to The Sydney Morning Herald, stated of the move: “It's hard to blame Joseph for going to rugby and considering it as his future when he is going to be paid twice the money for doing half the work;” “In rugby they play around 33 minutes per match, but in league the ball is in play for 57 minutes, so it would be a lot easier to earn your money. Besides, I really think that after Joseph plays rugby for a little while he will get terribly bored and return to rugby league. That’s what the majority of the players who switch codes do.” Former Wallaby Tim Horan, responding to V’landys' comments, stated: “I've been quite disappointed in the comments from some – not all – rugby league commentators. Quite disappointed about how they probably disrespected the game of rugby, I think, and how good we are globally... Peter V'landys, who's apparently a wonderful administrator to say 'I think you're going to be bored going and playing rugby' – I think that's pretty poor form from Peter.” Adding, “You probably should have said 'Joseph, thanks very much for what you've already done for us in the game. We've got two years left, we're going to support you for the next two years. You brought a lot of boys and girls through the turnstiles and we wish you the best when you go in two years' time.”

=== Waratahs ===
==== 2025 ====
As Sua'ali'i was in the Australia squad throughout November 2024, he missed being with the Waratahs in their early off-season. This included a tour of Japan to play the Kubota Spears under new coach Dan McKellar. Sua'ali'i re-joined the team following the end of the international calendar, however he did not make an appearance in any pre-season matches. He was also ruled out ahead of a rivalry clash in early February against the ACT Brumbies with "knee soreness" despite being named as the starting fullback. In spite of this sua'ali'i was cleared to play for the Waratahs in their first round home game of the 2025 Super Rugby Pacific season against New Zealand side, the Highlanders. As early as January 29 coach Dan McKellar did not have a position set out for Sua'ali'i. Speaking to Sydney's 2GB radio station, McKellar stated: "I've given him time in a number of different positions, so nothing is locked in... He's certainly got value across [the field]. You can play him on the wing, you can play him at 13 like he did on tour, you can play him at fullback. So, it's wherever he is going to be best suited for the team and obviously where we can build the game around him where he is going to get plenty of touches of the ball." Making mention of possible positions Sua'ali'i would start in, McKellar added: "The last thing I want is Joseph being in a position, or a game, where the ball just isn't coming to him... He's a threat with ball in hand and as coaches, we need to be smart and tactical on how we ensure that occurs. I'm giving him some time on the wing and some time at 13 and some time at fullback and we'll make a decision over the next couple of weeks." Sua'ali'i was named as the Waratahs fullback on 12 February ahead of their round one fixture. Sua'ali'i's first touch of the ball on debut for the Waratahs was in an aerial duel following a box kick from teammate Jake Gordon. He also made a darting run into the opposition's 22 metre line, a try-saving tackle against Highlanders outside centre Tanielu Teleʻa, and recorded two clean breaks, eleven carries and seventy-three metres gained in total before being subbed off in the 66th minute. The Waratahs won the match in the final minute of the game, 37–36. Following his debut Sua'ali'i was cited as declaring that the Super Rugby is tougher than international rugby.

=== International rugby union ===
In October 2024, Sua'ali'i was named in the Australia national team squad for the Autumn Nations Series by head coach Joe Schmidt having only played his last game for the Sydney Roosters a month prior. This meant he had not made his debut for his new club, the Waratahs, at the time of the announcement. In doing so, he became only the third player in Australian rugby history, after Matt Giteau and Tatafu Polota-Nau to debut for the Wallabies before playing in Super Rugby. In November 2024, he was named at outside centre in the starting XV to make his debut against England at Twickenham Stadium. He went on to win player-of-the-match in this fixture as Australia won 42–37. For Australia, this was their first win at Twickenham since the 2015 Rugby World Cup and the first time they had won the Ella–Mobbs Trophy since 2012. Throughout the game, he had twice as many offloads as any other player.

In August 2025, having been 22–0 down in the first quarter, he scored a try as part of a 38–22 victory over South Africa at Ellis Park in the opening fixture of the 2025 Rugby Championship. In September 2025, he scored two tries 28–24 victory over Argentina.

== Personal life ==
Sua'ali'i does not consume alcohol and states he has never had a sip of it. Sua'ali'i maintains a rigorous daily routine for mental and physical preparation, which includes waking up early, taking a cold shower, going for a walk, visualizing his day in a park for 15–20 minutes, and journaling. In June 2025, he publicly announced his relationship to Audrey Little

In March 2026, Sua'ali'i featured in the reality sports TV game show Rivals: Sport vs. Sport representing "Team Rugby Union" alongside Ashley Marsters, Desiree Miller, and Wallabies captain Harry Wilson.

== Career statistics ==
=== Rugby league statistics ===
- denotes team participated in seasons finals series.

As of match played 9 April 2022

New South Wales Cup

Team	Comp.	Season	Matches					Disc.		Goals	Tries	Points	Try ratio
Team	Comp.	Season	P	W	D	L	%	SB	SO	Goals	Tries	Points	Try ratio
North Sydney Bears	NSW Cup	2021	6	3	1	2	50	—N/a		—N/a	3	12	0.500
North Sydney Bears	NSW Cup	2022 (Note: Sua'ali'i did not take part in any of the North Sydney finals matches.)	3	3	0	0	100	—N/a		—N/a	0	0	0.000
Total			9	6	1	2	67	—N/a		—N/a	3	12	0.333
Team	Comp.	Season	P	W	D	L	%	SB	SO	Goals	Tries	Points	Try ratio
Team	Comp.	Season	Matches					Disc.		Goals	Tries	Points	Try ratio

As of match played 27 September 2024

NRL

Team	Comp.	Season	Matches					Disc.		Goals	Tries	Points	Try ratio
Team	Comp.	Season	P	W	D	L	%	SB	SO	Goals	Tries	Points	Try ratio
Sydney Roosters	National Rugby League	2021 (Note: Although the team participated in the 2021 finals series, Sua'ali'i was not a part of the team due to injury and thus did not play.)	5	2	0	3	40	—N/a		—N/a	1	4	0.200
Sydney Roosters	National Rugby League	2022	19	11	0	8	58	—N/a		—N/a	15	60	0.789
Sydney Roosters	National Rugby League	2023	21	13	0	8	62	—N/a		46	8	124	0.381
Sydney Roosters	National Rugby League	2024	21	13	0	8	62	—N/a		29	5	78	0.238
Total			66	39	0	27	59	—N/a		75	29	266	0.439
Team	Comp.	Season	P	W	D	L	%	SB	SO	Goals	Tries	Points	Try ratio
Team	Comp.	Season	Matches					Disc.		Goals	Tries	Points	Try ratio

International

As of match played 19 November 2022

Appearances and tries by national team and year
Team	Year	Apps	Tries
Samoa	2022	6	0
Samoa	Total	6	0

=== Rugby union statistics ===
As of 30 May 2026

=== Super Rugby ===
Season	Team	Games	Starts	Sub	Mins	Tries	Cons	Pens	Drops	Points	Yel	Red
2025	Waratahs	7	7	0	504	2	0	0	0	10	1	0
2026	Waratahs	5	5	0	379	0	0	0	0	0	0	0
Total		12	12	0	883	2	0	0	0	10	1	0

International

As of match played 17 October 2026

Appearances and tries by national team and year
Team	Year	Apps	Tries
Australia	2024	4	0
Australia	2025	14	4
Australia	2026	9	0
Australia	Total	27	4
