= Ron Coote Cup =

Rugby league series

- Sport: Rugby league
- Inaugural season: 2007; 19 years ago
- Number of teams: 2
- Country: Australia (National Rugby League)
- Cup holders: South Sydney Rabbitohs (2026)
- Most titles: Sydney Roosters (10 titles)

The Ron Coote Cup is a rugby league series of two matches contested annually in the National Rugby League between the South Sydney Rabbitohs and the Sydney Roosters. The Ron Coote Cup was introduced in 2007 in the name of Ron Coote who played with distinction for both clubs.

The Ron Coote Cup celebrates the career of Ron Coote AM, who won six premierships and played in nine Grand Finals during his 15 seasons.

"There have been 11 matches in the Ron Coote Cup since its beginning, with the Roosters winning seven times and the Rabbitohs winning four. The Rabbitohs last held the Ron Coote Cup in 2016, defeating the Roosters 52 to 27 over both legs. The Cardinal and Myrtle are determined to replicate those performances in 2018 and bring the silverware back to Redfern."

"Mr Coote won six premierships and played in nine Grand Finals during his 15 seasons playing first grade with both South Sydney (four premierships) and Eastern Suburbs (two premierships). The Ron Coote Cup is played across both home and away fixtures in any given season, with the winner determined by the aggregate score from those two regular season matches. 2026 will be the 20th time the clubs have contested the Ron Coote Cup."

Team	Played	Games won	Games lost	Draws	Cups	PF	PA	PD
South Sydney Rabbitohs	36	16	20	0	9	812	755	+57
Sydney Roosters	36	20	16	0	10	755	812	-57

== Results ==
Season	Game 1	Winner	Game 2	Winner	Aggregate Score	Ron Coote Cup Winner
2007	6–18	Rabbitohs	12–26	Roosters	32–30	Roosters
2008	20–34	Roosters	22–20	Roosters	56–40	Roosters
2009	52–12	Rabbitohs	40–20	Rabbitohs	92–32	Rabbitohs
2010	10–36	Roosters	18–14	Roosters	54–24	Roosters
2011	40–29	Roosters	21–20	Rabbitohs	60–50	Roosters
2012	20–24	Roosters	24–22	Rabbitohs	46–44	Roosters
2013	10–28	Rabbitohs	24–12	Roosters	40–34	Rabbitohs
2014	28–8	Rabbitohs	22–18	Roosters	46–30	Rabbitohs
2015	34–26	Rabbitohs	30–0	Roosters	56–34	Roosters
2016	42–10	Rabbitohs	17–10	Roosters	52–27	Rabbitohs
2017	20–6	Roosters	14–12	Roosters	34–18	Roosters
2018	26–14	Rabbitohs	18–14	Roosters	40–32	Rabbitohs
2019	26–16	Rabbitohs	16–10	Rabbitohs	42–26	Rabbitohs
2020	28–12	Roosters	60–8	Rabbitohs	72–36	Rabbitohs
2021	26–16	Rabbitohs	12–54	Rabbitohs	80–28	Rabbitohs
2022	28–16	Rabbitohs	26–16	Roosters	44-42	Rabbitohs
2023	20–18	Roosters	26–12	Roosters	46-30	Roosters
2024	48–6	Roosters	36–28	Roosters	84-34	Roosters
2025	20–14	Rabbitohs	36–6	Roosters	50-26	Roosters
2026	26–18	Roosters	50–20	Rabbitohs	68-46	Rabbitohs

== See also ==
- Rivalries in the National Rugby League
