= 2023 NRL season results =

The 2023 NRL season was the 116th of professional rugby league in Australia and the 26th season run by the National Rugby League.

Attendance data is compiled from both the NRL and Austadiums websites.

== Regular season ==
=== Round 1 ===
March 2-5

Home	Score	Away	Match information			
Home	Score	Away	Day & Time	Venue	Referee	Attendance
Parramatta Eels	12–16	Melbourne Storm	Thursday, 7:50 pm	CommBank Stadium	Ashley Klein	17,301
New Zealand Warriors	20–12	Newcastle Knights	Friday, 6:00 pm	Sky Stadium	Chris Sutton	16,676
Penrith Panthers	12–13	Brisbane Broncos	Friday, 8:05 pm	BlueBet Stadium	Gerard Sutton	17,125
Manly Warringah Sea Eagles	31–6	Canterbury-Bankstown Bulldogs	Saturday, 3:00 pm	4 Pines Park	Grant Atkins	17,278
North Queensland Cowboys	19–18	Canberra Raiders	Saturday, 5:30 pm	Queensland Country Bank Stadium	Adam Gee	19,855
Cronulla-Sutherland Sharks	18–27	South Sydney Rabbitohs	Saturday, 7:35 pm	PointsBet Stadium	Todd Smith	12,757
Dolphins	28–18	Sydney Roosters	Sunday, 4:05 pm	Suncorp Stadium	Chris Butler	32,177
Wests Tigers	10–22	Gold Coast Titans	Sunday, 6:15 pm	Leichhardt Oval	Peter Gough	14,667
Bye: St. George Illawarra Dragons

- The Dolphins made their official NRL debut and also recorded their first ever victory.
- Both the Manly–Canterbury and Cronulla–Souths games were sellouts.
- Tim Sheens coached his 250th game for the Wests Tigers.

=== Round 2 ===
March 9-12

Home	Score	Away	Match information			
Home	Score	Away	Day & Time	Venue	Referee	Attendance
Penrith Panthers	16–10	South Sydney Rabbitohs	Thursday, 7:50 pm	BlueBet Stadium	Grant Atkins	16,906
Parramatta Eels	26–30	Cronulla-Sutherland Sharks	Friday, 6:00 pm	CommBank Stadium	Gerard Sutton	16,663
Brisbane Broncos	28–16	North Queensland Cowboys	Friday, 8:05 pm	Suncorp Stadium	Ashley Klein	43,162
Sydney Roosters	20–12	New Zealand Warriors	Saturday, 3:00 pm	Allianz Stadium	Adam Gee	16,266
Dolphins	20–14	Canberra Raiders	Saturday, 5:30 pm	Kayo Stadium	Todd Smith	10,023
Melbourne Storm	12–26	Canterbury-Bankstown Bulldogs	Saturday, 7:35 pm	AAMI Park	Chris Butler	17,248
Wests Tigers	12–14	Newcastle Knights	Sunday, 4:05 pm	Leichhardt Oval	Peter Gough	13,214
St. George Illawarra Dragons	32–18	Gold Coast Titans	Sunday, 6:15 pm	Netstrata Jubilee Stadium	Chris Sutton	8,538
Bye: Manly Warringah Sea Eagles

=== Round 3 (Multicultural Round) ===
March 16-19

Home	Score	Away	Match information			
Home	Score	Away	Day & Time	Venue	Referee	Attendance
Manly Warringah Sea Eagles	34–30	Parramatta Eels	Thursday, 7:50 pm	4 Pines Park	Adam Gee	13,363
Newcastle Knights	20–36	Dolphins	Friday, 6:00 pm	McDonald Jones Stadium	Chris Butler	20,093
Sydney Roosters	20–18	South Sydney Rabbitohs	Friday, 8:05 pm	Allianz Stadium	Gerard Sutton	36,669
Gold Coast Titans	38–34	Melbourne Storm	Saturday, 3:00 pm	Cbus Super Stadium	Grant Atkins	14,483
North Queensland Cowboys	12–26	New Zealand Warriors	Saturday, 5:30 pm	Queensland Country Bank Stadium	Chris Sutton	17,818
Brisbane Broncos	40–18	St. George Illawarra Dragons	Saturday, 7:35 pm	Suncorp Stadium	Peter Gough	26,612
Canterbury-Bankstown Bulldogs	26–22	Wests Tigers	Sunday, 4:05 pm	Belmore Sports Ground	Todd Smith	16,404
Canberra Raiders	24–20	Cronulla-Sutherland Sharks	Sunday, 6:15 pm	GIO Stadium	Ashley Klein	14,134
Bye: Penrith Panthers

- The Bulldogs-Tigers fixture at Belmore was a sellout.

=== Round 4 ===
March 23-26

Home	Score	Away	Match information			
Home	Score	Away	Day & Time	Venue	Referee	Attendance
Parramatta Eels	17–16	Penrith Panthers	Thursday, 7:50 pm	CommBank Stadium	Ashley Klein	16,342
Melbourne Storm	24–12	Wests Tigers	Friday, 6:00 pm	AAMI Park	Ben Cummins	11,669
Dolphins	12–18	Brisbane Broncos	Friday, 8:00 pm	Suncorp Stadium	Adam Gee	51,047
North Queensland Cowboys	24–12	Gold Coast Titans	Saturday, 5:30 pm	Queensland Country Bank Stadium	Chris Butler	16,426
South Sydney Rabbitohs	13–12	Manly Warringah Sea Eagles	Saturday, 7:35 pm	Accor Stadium	Chris Sutton	18,379
New Zealand Warriors	16–14	Canterbury-Bankstown Bulldogs	Sunday, 2:00 pm	Mount Smart Stadium	Peter Gough	18,495
Newcastle Knights	24–14	Canberra Raiders	Sunday, 4:05 pm	McDonald Jones Stadium	Gerard Sutton	15,106
St. George Illawarra Dragons	8–40	Cronulla-Sutherland Sharks	Sunday, 6:15 pm	Netstrata Jubilee Stadium	Todd Smith	15,126
Bye: Sydney Roosters

- The sellout crowd of 51,047 is the biggest regular season crowd (excluding double headers) in Suncorp Stadium's history, the biggest regular season crowd in Brisbane since round 22, 1995, and the biggest regular NRL season crowd since round 26, 2013.

=== Round 5 ===
March 30-April 2

Home	Score	Away	Match information			
Home	Score	Away	Day & Time	Venue	Referee	Attendance
Sydney Roosters	28–20	Parramatta Eels	Thursday, 7:50 pm	Allianz Stadium	Grant Atkins	20,866
Canberra Raiders	12–53	Penrith Panthers	Friday, 6:00 pm	GIO Stadium	Adam Gee	15,344
South Sydney Rabbitohs	10–18	Melbourne Storm	Friday, 8:05 pm	Accor Stadium	Todd Smith	11,239
Manly Warringah Sea Eagles	32–32	Newcastle Knights	Saturday, 3:00 pm	Glen Willow Oval	Chris Butler	9,024
St. George Illawarra Dragons	38–12	Dolphins	Saturday, 5:30 pm	WIN Stadium	Gerard Sutton	16,472
Brisbane Broncos	46–12	Wests Tigers	Saturday, 7:35 pm	Suncorp Stadium	Chris Sutton	27,533
Cronulla-Sutherland Sharks	30–32	New Zealand Warriors	Sunday, 4:00 pm	PointsBet Stadium	Ben Cummins	10,878
Canterbury-Bankstown Bulldogs	15–14	North Queensland Cowboys	Sunday, 6:15 pm	Accor Stadium	Liam Kennedy	9,626
Bye: Gold Coast Titans

- The Manly Newcastle game is the tied 4th highest drawn game ever, and the first draw in nearly 3 years.

=== Round 6 (Easter Round) ===
April 6-10

Home	Score	Away	Match information			
Home	Score	Away	Day & Time	Venue	Referee	Attendance
Melbourne Storm	28–8	Sydney Roosters	Thursday, 7:50 pm	AAMI Park	Ashley Klein	16,323
Canterbury-Bankstown Bulldogs	16–50	South Sydney Rabbitohs	Friday, 4:00 pm	Accor Stadium	Gerard Sutton	35,211
North Queensland Cowboys	22–32	Dolphins	Friday, 8:00 pm	Queensland Country Bank Stadium	Adam Gee	22,811
Penrith Panthers	44–12	Manly Warringah Sea Eagles	Saturday, 5:30 pm	BlueBet Stadium	Todd Smith	20,312
Brisbane Broncos	14–20	Canberra Raiders	Saturday, 7:35 pm	Suncorp Stadium	Grant Atkins	31,962
Gold Coast Titans	20–18	St. George Illawarra Dragons	Sunday, 4:05 pm	Cbus Super Stadium	Peter Gough	12,453
Newcastle Knights	34–24	New Zealand Warriors	Sunday, 6:15 pm	McDonald Jones Stadium	Liam Kennedy	18,007
Wests Tigers	22–28	Parramatta Eels	Monday, 4:00 pm	Accor Stadium	Ben Cummins	28,611
Bye: Cronulla-Sutherland Sharks

=== Round 7 ===
April 13-16

Home	Score	Away	Match information			
Home	Score	Away	Day & Time	Venue	Referee	Attendance
Dolphins	14–36	South Sydney Rabbitohs	Thursday, 7:50 pm	Suncorp Stadium	Ashley Klein	23,280
Cronulla-Sutherland Sharks	22–12	Sydney Roosters	Friday, 6:00 pm	PointsBet Stadium	Grant Atkins	11,489
Manly Warringah Sea Eagles	18–8	Melbourne Storm	Friday, 8:00 pm	4 Pines Park	Adam Gee	13,572
New Zealand Warriors	22–14	North Queensland Cowboys	Saturday, 3:00 pm	Mount Smart Stadium	Chris Sutton	23,685
Newcastle Knights	15–16	Penrith Panthers	Saturday, 5:30 pm	McDonald Jones Stadium	Peter Gough	26,084
Gold Coast Titans	26–43	Brisbane Broncos	Saturday, 7:35 pm	Cbus Super Stadium	Todd Smith	26,563
Canberra Raiders	20–14	St. George Illawarra Dragons	Sunday, 2:00 pm	GIO Stadium	Gerard Sutton	13,817
Parramatta Eels	30–4	Canterbury-Bankstown Bulldogs	Sunday, 4:05 pm	CommBank Stadium	Chris Butler	27,655
Bye: Wests Tigers

- The Newcastle vs Penrith match was the 150th golden point NRL match since its introduction to decide drawn matches in 2003.
- The Warriors-Cowboys and Titans-Broncos games were both sellouts

=== Round 8 (ANZAC Round) ===
April 20-25

Home	Score	Away	Match information			
Home	Score	Away	Day & Time	Venue	Referee	Attendance
South Sydney Rabbitohs	20–18	Penrith Panthers	Thursday, 7:50 pm	Accor Stadium	Gerard Sutton	19,548
Parramatta Eels	16–26	Brisbane Broncos	Friday, 8:00 pm	TIO Stadium	Ashley Klein	11,864
Canterbury-Bankstown Bulldogs	20–33	Cronulla-Sutherland Sharks	Saturday, 5:30 pm	Accor Stadium	Chris Sutton	12,148
North Queensland Cowboys	18–16	Newcastle Knights	Saturday, 7:35 pm	Queensland Country Bank Stadium	Ben Cummins	17,970
Dolphins	28–26	Gold Coast Titans	Sunday, 2:00 pm	Suncorp Stadium	Chris Butler	22,034
Wests Tigers	16–22	Manly Warringah Sea Eagles	Sunday, 4:00 pm	Campbelltown Sports Stadium	Todd Smith	10,033
Sydney Roosters	27–26	St. George Illawarra Dragons	Tuesday, 4:00 pm	Allianz Stadium	Adam Gee	40,191
Melbourne Storm	30–22	New Zealand Warriors	Tuesday, 7:00 pm	AAMI Park	Grant Atkins	23,649
Bye: Canberra Raiders

- The Dolphins recorded their biggest ever comeback to date after being 26 points down against Gold Coast at the 28 minute mark to win 28–26. It is also the Titan's worst collapse to date. This comeback was also the equal largest comeback in NRL record and the first time a team came back from 26 points behind to win since 1998.

=== Round 9 ===
April 27-30

Home	Score	Away	Match information			
Home	Score	Away	Day & Time	Venue	Referee	Attendance
Cronulla-Sutherland Sharks	44–6	North Queensland Cowboys	Thursday, 7:50 pm	PointsBet Stadium	Gerard Sutton	8,148
Parramatta Eels	43–12	Newcastle Knights	Friday, 6:00 pm	CommBank Stadium	Chris Sutton	15,875
Brisbane Broncos	6–32	South Sydney Rabbitohs	Friday, 8:00 pm	Suncorp Stadium	Ashley Klein	40,102
Canberra Raiders	31–30	Dolphins	Saturday, 3:00 pm	McDonald's Park	Peter Gough	10,445
Manly Warringah Sea Eagles	10–26	Gold Coast Titans	Saturday, 5:30 pm	4 Pines Park	Ben Cummins	10,107
Penrith Panthers	8–12	Wests Tigers	Saturday, 7:35 pm	Carrington Park	Adam Gee	11,055
New Zealand Warriors	0–14	Sydney Roosters	Sunday, 2:00 pm	Mount Smart Stadium	Chris Butler	20,395
St. George Illawarra Dragons	16–18	Canterbury-Bankstown Bulldogs	Sunday, 4:05 pm	WIN Stadium	Grant Atkins	16,678
Bye: Melbourne Storm

- The Wests Tigers ended their club record 12 game losing streak dating back to round 21, 2022 with their win over Penrith.
- New Zealand Warriors are the first team to be held scoreless in a game this season.

=== Round 10 (Magic Round) ===
May 5-7

Home	Score	Away	Match information			
Home	Score	Away	Day & Time	Venue	Referee	Attendance
Canterbury-Bankstown Bulldogs	30–34	Canberra Raiders	Friday, 6:00 pm	Suncorp Stadium	Chris Sutton	50,077
Manly Warringah Sea Eagles	6–32	Brisbane Broncos	Friday, 8:05 pm	Suncorp Stadium	Gerard Sutton	50,077
New Zealand Warriors	6–18	Penrith Panthers	Saturday, 3:00 pm	Suncorp Stadium	Todd Smith	50,183
Cronulla-Sutherland Sharks	16–36	Dolphins	Saturday, 5:30 pm	Suncorp Stadium	Grant Atkins	50,183
Melbourne Storm	12–28	South Sydney Rabbitohs	Saturday, 7:45 pm	Suncorp Stadium	Adam Gee	50,183
Wests Tigers	18–16	St. George Illawarra Dragons	Sunday, 1:50 pm	Suncorp Stadium	Peter Gough	46,845
Sydney Roosters	6–20	North Queensland Cowboys	Sunday, 4:00 pm	Suncorp Stadium	Ashley Klein	46,845
Gold Coast Titans	26–24	Parramatta Eels	Sunday, 6:25 pm	Suncorp Stadium	Chris Butler	46,845
Bye: Newcastle Knights

- Wayne Bennett coached his 900th NRL match.

=== Round 11 ===
May 11-14

Home	Score	Away	Match information			
Home	Score	Away	Day & Time	Venue	Referee	Attendance
Melbourne Storm	24–16	Brisbane Broncos	Thursday, 7:50 pm	AAMI Park	Todd Smith	16,043
Canterbury-Bankstown Bulldogs	12–24	New Zealand Warriors	Friday, 6:00 pm	Accor Stadium	Ben Cummins	14,294
Penrith Panthers	48–4	Sydney Roosters	Friday, 8:00 pm	BlueBet Stadium	Gerard Sutton	20,255
South Sydney Rabbitohs	20–0	Wests Tigers	Saturday, 3:00 pm	Accor Stadium	Liam Kennedy	21,013
North Queensland Cowboys	42–22	St. George Illawarra Dragons	Saturday, 5:30 pm	Queensland Country Bank Stadium	Chris Butler	17,852
Canberra Raiders	26–18	Parramatta Eels	Saturday, 7:35 pm	GIO Stadium	Grant Atkins	17,414
Newcastle Knights	46–26	Gold Coast Titans	Sunday, 2:00 pm	McDonald Jones Stadium	Peter Gough	13,064
Manly Warringah Sea Eagles	14–20	Cronulla-Sutherland Sharks	Sunday, 4:05 pm	4 Pines Park	Ashley Klein	10,358
Bye: Dolphins

- Anthony Griffin coached his last game as coach for St George Illawarra as he was sacked after their loss to North Queensland.
- The Sharks beat Manly at their home ground for the second time in a row, the first time this has occurred in their history.

=== Round 12 (Indigenous Round) ===
May 18-21

Home	Score	Away	Match information			
Home	Score	Away	Day & Time	Venue	Referee	Attendance
Brisbane Broncos	4–15	Penrith Panthers	Thursday, 7:50 pm	Suncorp Stadium	Adam Gee	33,343
St. George Illawarra Dragons	24–22	Sydney Roosters	Friday, 6:00 pm	Netstrata Jubilee Stadium	Peter Gough	9,007
South Sydney Rabbitohs	16–36	Parramatta Eels	Friday, 8:00 pm	Allianz Stadium	Ashley Klein	27,432
Cronulla-Sutherland Sharks	26–6	Newcastle Knights	Saturday, 3:00 pm	C.ex Coffs International Stadium	Liam Kennedy	10,156
Wests Tigers	66–18	North Queensland Cowboys	Saturday, 5:30 pm	Leichhardt Oval	Ben Cummins	12,247
Dolphins	16–24	Melbourne Storm	Saturday, 7:35 pm	Suncorp Stadium	Grant Atkins	28,325
Canterbury-Bankstown Bulldogs	20–18	Gold Coast Titans	Sunday, 2:00 pm	Accor Stadium	Chris Butler	10,815
Canberra Raiders	14–42	Manly Warringah Sea Eagles	Sunday, 4:05 pm	GIO Stadium	Gerard Sutton	14,730
Bye: New Zealand Warriors

- St George Illawarra defeated the Roosters outside of ANZAC Day for the first time since the 2010 Grand Final.
- Wests Tigers scored the most points in a single game in their club history.

=== Round 13 ===
May 25-28

Home	Score	Away	Match information			
Home	Score	Away	Day & Time	Venue	Referee	Attendance
Dolphins	26–12	St. George Illawarra Dragons	Thursday, 7:50 pm	Kayo Stadium	Adam Gee	10,047
Parramatta Eels	24–16	North Queensland Cowboys	Friday, 8:00 pm	CommBank Stadium	Liam Kennedy	14,810
New Zealand Warriors	22–26	Brisbane Broncos	Saturday, 5:30 pm	McLean Park	Gerard Sutton	16,195
South Sydney Rabbitohs	26–33	Canberra Raiders	Saturday, 7:35 pm	Accor Stadium	Grant Atkins	12,382
Newcastle Knights	28–18	Manly Warringah Sea Eagles	Sunday, 4:05 pm	McDonald Jones Stadium	Peter Gough	20,661
Bye: Canterbury-Bankstown Bulldogs, Cronulla-Sutherland Sharks, Gold Coast Titans, Melbourne Storm, Penrith Panthers, Sydney Roosters, Wests Tigers

- Canberra Raiders player Corey Harawira-Naera suffered a seizure in the 65th minute halting play for more than 10 minutes.

=== Round 14 ===
June 2-4

Home	Score	Away	Match information			
Home	Score	Away	Day & Time	Venue	Referee	Attendance
Wests Tigers	19–20	Canberra Raiders	Friday 8:00 pm	Campbelltown Sports Stadium	Gerard Sutton	11,201
New Zealand Warriors	30–8	Dolphins	Saturday, 3:00 pm	Go Media Stadium	Grant Atkins	23,686
Gold Coast Titans	28–46	South Sydney Rabbitohs	Saturday, 5:30 pm	Cbus Super Stadium	Liam Kennedy	18,736
Cronulla-Sutherland Sharks	12–20	Brisbane Broncos	Saturday, 7:35 pm	PointsBet Stadium	Todd Smith	12,318
Sydney Roosters	25–24	Canterbury-Bankstown Bulldogs	Sunday, 2:00 pm	Industree Group Stadium	Ashley Klein	18,338
North Queensland Cowboys	45–20	Melbourne Storm	Sunday, 4:05 pm	Queensland Country Bank Stadium	Peter Gough	18,867
Penrith Panthers	26–18	St. George Illawarra Dragons	Sunday, 6:15 pm	BlueBet Stadium	Chris Sutton	16,912
Bye: Manly Warringah Sea Eagles, Newcastle Knights, Parramatta Eels

- The Cowboys 45 points was the highest score that Melbourne conceded since round 20, 2003.

=== Round 15 ===
June 8-12

Home	Score	Away	Match information			
Home	Score	Away	Day & Time	Venue	Referee	Attendance
Gold Coast Titans	28–12	Wests Tigers	Thursday, 7:50 pm	Cbus Super Stadium	Todd Smith	10,232
Canberra Raiders	14–36	New Zealand Warriors	Friday, 6:00 pm	GIO Stadium	Grant Atkins	21,082
Manly Warringah Sea Eagles	58–18	Dolphins	Friday, 8:00 pm	4 Pines Park	Gerard Sutton	14,598
St. George Illawarra Dragons	36–30	South Sydney Rabbitohs	Saturday, 3:00 pm	Netstrata Jubilee Stadium	Ben Cummins	17,357
Brisbane Broncos	24–20	Newcastle Knights	Saturday, 5:30 pm	Suncorp Stadium	Chris Butler	35,814
Sydney Roosters	6–30	Penrith Panthers	Saturday, 7:35 pm	Allianz Stadium	Adam Gee	23,610
Melbourne Storm	54–10	Cronulla-Sutherland Sharks	Sunday, 4:05 pm	AAMI Park	Ashley Klein	20,253
Canterbury-Bankstown Bulldogs	12–34	Parramatta Eels	Monday, 4:00 pm	Accor Stadium	Liam Kennedy	33,866
Bye: North Queensland Cowboys

- The crowd of 21,082 was the highest regular season crowd at Canberra Stadium since round 25, 2006.
- The Dolphins recorded their biggest loss to date in their 40 point loss to Manly.

=== Round 16 ===
June 16-18

Home	Score	Away	Match information			
Home	Score	Away	Day & Time	Venue	Referee	Attendance
North Queensland Cowboys	27–23	Penrith Panthers	Friday, 8:00 pm	Queensland Country Bank Stadium	Peter Gough	17,277
Newcastle Knights	16–18	Sydney Roosters	Saturday, 3:00 pm	McDonald Jones Stadium	Grant Atkins	21,966
Parramatta Eels	34–4	Manly Warringah Sea Eagles	Saturday, 5:30 pm	CommBank Stadium	Chris Butler	21,296
Wests Tigers	6–28	Melbourne Storm	Saturday, 7:35 pm	Campbelltown Sports Stadium	Ziggy Przeklasa-Adamski	8,517
Cronulla-Sutherland Sharks	48–10	Canterbury-Bankstown Bulldogs	Sunday, 4:05 pm	PointsBet Stadium	Adam Gee	11,901
Bye: Brisbane Broncos, Canberra Raiders, Dolphins, Gold Coast Titans, New Zealand Warriors, South Sydney Rabbitohs, St. George Illawarra Dragons

- Alex Twal scored his first try in the NRL breaking a 116 game drought

=== Round 17 ===
June 23-25

Home	Score	Away	Match information			
Home	Score	Away	Day & Time	Venue	Referee	Attendance
St. George Illawarra Dragons	18–48	New Zealand Warriors	Friday, 8:00 pm	WIN Stadium	Adam Gee	9,275
Dolphins	20–48	Parramatta Eels	Saturday, 3:00 pm	Sunshine Coast Stadium	Peter Gough	8,821
Penrith Panthers	20–12	Newcastle Knights	Saturday, 5:30 pm	BlueBet Stadium	Ben Cummins	18,295
Melbourne Storm	24–6	Manly Warringah Sea Eagles	Saturday, 7:35 pm	AAMI Park	Todd Smith	13,198
Brisbane Broncos	12–18	Gold Coast Titans	Sunday, 2:00 pm	Suncorp Stadium	Chris Butler	42,249
South Sydney Rabbitohs	6–31	North Queensland Cowboys	Sunday, 4:05 pm	Accor Stadium	Gerard Sutton	11,262
Sydney Roosters	18–20	Canberra Raiders	Sunday, 6:15 pm	Allianz Stadium	Ashley Klein	13,326
Bye: Canterbury-Bankstown Bulldogs, Cronulla-Sutherland Sharks, Wests Tigers

=== Round 18 ===
June 29-July 2

Home	Score	Away	Match information			
Home	Score	Away	Day & Time	Venue	Referee	Attendance
Cronulla-Sutherland Sharks	52–16	St. George Illawarra Dragons	Thursday, 7:50 pm	PointsBet Stadium	Grant Atkins	10,267
New Zealand Warriors	6–28	South Sydney Rabbitohs	Friday, 6:00 pm	Go Media Stadium	Ashley Klein	22,612
Melbourne Storm	16–34	Penrith Panthers	Friday, 8:00 pm	Marvel Stadium	Adam Gee	26,829
Canberra Raiders	26–22	Gold Coast Titans	Saturday, 3:00 pm	GIO Stadium	Todd Smith	11,659
North Queensland Cowboys	74–0	Wests Tigers	Saturday, 5:30pm	Queensland Country Bank Stadium	Liam Kennedy	20,535
Brisbane Broncos	24–16	Dolphins	Saturday, 7:35 pm	The Gabba	Peter Gough	30,606
Canterbury-Bankstown Bulldogs	0–66	Newcastle Knights	Sunday, 2:00 pm	Accor Stadium	Ziggy Przeklasa-Adamski	11,004
Manly Warringah Sea Eagles	18–16	Sydney Roosters	Sunday, 4:05 pm	4 Pines Park	Gerard Sutton	17,385
Bye: Parramatta Eels

- North Queensland recorded their highest ever score.
- North Queensland's score of 74 points was the highest by any team since round 22, 2008 as well as equal 3rd highest overall and the equal highest since the value of tries was increased to 4 points in 1983.
- North Queensland recorded the biggest win by any club since round 6, 1935.
- Valentine Holmes broke two Cowboys club records with the most points in a match with 30 points (2 tries and 11 goals) as well as the most goals in a match.
- Wests Tigers recorded their biggest ever loss.
- Newcastle recorded their biggest ever win as well as their highest score since round 2, 2006.
- Canterbury recorded their equal 3rd biggest loss.
- The New Zealand-Souths, Brisbane-Dolphins and Manly-Sydney games were all sold out.

=== Round 19 ===
July 6-9

Home	Score	Away	Match information			
Home	Score	Away	Day & Time	Venue	Referee	Attendance
Wests Tigers	12–36	Cronulla-Sutherland Sharks	Thursday, 7:50 pm	CommBank Stadium	Todd Smith	9,215
St. George Illawarra Dragons	26–36	Canberra Raiders	Friday, 8:00 pm	WIN Stadium	Peter Gough	9,369
Parramatta Eels	10–46	New Zealand Warriors	Saturday, 5:30 pm	CommBank Stadium	Adam Gee	21,696
South Sydney Rabbitohs	32–36	Canterbury-Bankstown Bulldogs	Saturday, 7:35 pm	Accor Stadium	Liam Kennedy	16,166
Gold Coast Titans	21–23	Dolphins	Sunday, 4:05 pm	Cbus Super Stadium	Grant Atkins	18,335
Bye: Brisbane Broncos, Manly Warringah Sea Eagles, Melbourne Storm, Newcastle Knights, North Queensland Cowboys, Penrith Panthers, Sydney Roosters

=== Round 20 ===
July 14-16

Home	Score	Away	Match information			
Home	Score	Away	Day & Time	Venue	Referee	Attendance
Newcastle Knights	34–18	Wests Tigers	Friday, 8:00 pm	McDonald Jones Stadium	Peter Gough	18,470
Canterbury-Bankstown Bulldogs	24–44	Brisbane Broncos	Saturday, 3:00 pm	Belmore Sports Ground	Ziggy Przeklasa-Adamski	17,103
Manly Warringah Sea Eagles	8–19	North Queensland Cowboys	Saturday, 5:30 pm	4 Pines Park	Adam Gee	13,240
Sydney Roosters	16–30	Melbourne Storm	Saturday, 7:35 pm	Sydney Cricket Ground	Grant Atkins	12,021
New Zealand Warriors	44–12	Cronulla-Sutherland Sharks	Sunday, 2:00 pm	Go Media Stadium	Gerard Sutton	24,012
Dolphins	14–24	Penrith Panthers	Sunday, 4:05 pm	Kayo Stadium	Todd Smith	10,065
Parramatta Eels	25–24	Gold Coast Titans	Sunday, 6:15 pm	CommBank Stadium	Chris Butler	12,599
Bye: Canberra Raiders, South Sydney Rabbitohs, St. George Illawarra Dragons

=== Round 21 ===
July 20-23

Home	Score	Away	Match information			
Home	Score	Away	Day & Time	Venue	Referee	Attendance
St. George Illawarra Dragons	18–14	Wests Tigers	Thursday, 7:50 pm	WIN Stadium	Ben Cummins	7,246
New Zealand Warriors	21–20	Canberra Raiders	Friday, 6:00 pm	Go Media Stadium	Todd Smith	19,112
South Sydney Rabbitohs	20–36	Brisbane Broncos	Friday, 8:00 pm	Sunshine Coast Stadium	Ashley Klein	8,931
Gold Coast Titans	18–36	Sydney Roosters	Saturday, 3:00 pm	Cbus Super Stadium	Adam Gee	15,362
Newcastle Knights	26–18	Melbourne Storm	Saturday, 5:30 pm	McDonald Jones Stadium	Gerard Sutton	20,392
North Queensland Cowboys	24–16	Parramatta Eels	Saturday, 7:35 pm	Queensland Country Bank Stadium	Grant Atkins	20,710
Penrith Panthers	44–18	Canterbury-Bankstown Bulldogs	Sunday, 2:00 pm	BlueBet Stadium	Chris Butler	21,525
Cronulla-Sutherland Sharks	26–30	Manly Warringah Sea Eagles	Sunday, 4:05 pm	PointsBet Stadium	Peter Gough	10,634
Bye: Dolphins

=== Round 22 ===
July 27-30

Home	Score	Away	Match information			
Home	Score	Away	Day & Time	Venue	Referee	Attendance
Brisbane Broncos	32–10	Sydney Roosters	Thursday, 7:50 pm	The Gabba	Grant Atkins	21,841
Wests Tigers	18–32	South Sydney Rabbitohs	Friday, 6:00 pm	Scully Park	Ziggy Przeklasa-Adamski	10,453
Melbourne Storm	46–16	Parramatta Eels	Friday, 8:00 pm	Marvel Stadium	Ashley Klein	20,429
Canberra Raiders	6–28	Newcastle Knights	Saturday, 3:00 pm	GIO Stadium	Adam Gee	15,487
St. George Illawarra Dragons	18-24	Manly Warringah Sea Eagles	Saturday, 5:30 pm	WIN Stadium	Chris Butler	14,872
Penrith Panthers	28-0	Cronulla-Sutherland Sharks	Saturday, 7:35 pm	BlueBet Stadium	Gerard Sutton	20,694
Canterbury-Bankstown Bulldogs	23-22	Dolphins	Sunday, 2:00 pm	Salter Oval	Peter Gough	5,130
Gold Coast Titans	22-13	North Queensland Cowboys	Sunday, 4:05 pm	Cbus Super Stadium	Todd Smith	16,516
Bye: New Zealand Warriors

- With his 140th try, Daniel Tupou broke the Sydney Roosters all-time try scoring record.
- Starting with the Broncos-Roosters game, all teams have covered the NRL logo on there jersey in an attempt to boycott the NRL.
- Manly Captain Daly Cherry-Evans Played his 300th NRL Game Against the St George Illawarra Dragons.
- Cameron McInnes Made a total of 81 tackles, which is the most tackles made by a player in a single game in the NRL-era. The old record was 78 tackles by Micheal Luck back in 2009.

=== Round 23 ===
August 3-6

Home	Score	Away	Match information			
Home	Score	Away	Day & Time	Venue	Referee	Attendance
Sydney Roosters	26–16	Manly Warringah Sea Eagles	Thursday, 7:50 pm	Sydney Cricket Ground	Ashley Klein	12,197
Gold Coast Titans	18–28	New Zealand Warriors	Friday, 6:00 pm	Cbus Super Stadium	Ben Cummins	20,877
Penrith Panthers	26–6	Melbourne Storm	Friday, 8:00 pm	BlueBet Stadium	Adam Gee	19,953
North Queensland Cowboys	14–30	Brisbane Broncos	Saturday, 3:00 pm	Queensland Country Bank Stadium	Gerard Sutton	22,659
Dolphins	28–30	Newcastle Knights	Saturday, 5:30 pm	Optus Stadium	Grant Atkins	42,042
South Sydney Rabbitohs	16–26	Cronulla-Sutherland Sharks	Saturday, 7:35 pm	Optus Stadium	Todd Smith	45,814
Parramatta Eels	26–20	St. George Illawarra Dragons	Sunday, 2:00 pm	CommBank Stadium	Ziggy Przeklasa-Adamski	23,596
Canberra Raiders	22–18	Wests Tigers	Sunday, 4:05 pm	GIO Stadium	Peter Gough	12,841
Bye: Canterbury-Bankstown Bulldogs

- Nathan Brown became the first Roosters player to be sent off since round 9, 2013.

=== Round 24 ===
August 10-13

Home	Score	Away	Match information			
Home	Score	Away	Day & Time	Venue	Referee	Attendance
Manly Warringah Sea Eagles	12–24	Penrith Panthers	Thursday, 7:50 pm	4 Pines Park	Gerard Sutton	10,102
Cronulla-Sutherland Sharks	36–6	Gold Coast Titans	Friday, 6:00 pm	PointsBet Stadium	Ashley Klein	9,753
Brisbane Broncos	54–10	Parramatta Eels	Friday, 8:00 pm	The Gabba	Adam Gee	29,005
South Sydney Rabbitohs	36–24	St. George Illawarra Dragons	Saturday, 3:00 pm	Barlow Park	Ben Cummins	8,378
Wests Tigers	22–30	New Zealand Warriors	Saturday, 5:30 pm	FMG Stadium Waikato	Chris Butler	25,118
Sydney Roosters	30–14	Dolphins	Saturday, 7:35 pm	Allianz Stadium	Todd Smith	13,704
Melbourne Storm	48–2	Canberra Raiders	Sunday, 2:00 pm	AAMI Park	Grant Atkins	17,369
Newcastle Knights	42–6	Canterbury-Bankstown Bulldogs	Sunday, 4:05 pm	McDonald Jones Stadium	Peter Gough	23,464
Bye: North Queensland Cowboys

- Adam Reynolds became the second player in NRL history to kick 1,000 career goals.
- By failing to score a try for the first time since Round 16 in 2013, Canberra Raiders streak of scoring a try a game ended at 252 games, a NRL record.

=== Round 25 ===
August 17-20

Home	Score	Away	Match information			
Home	Score	Away	Day & Time	Venue	Referee	Attendance
North Queensland Cowboys	12–32	Cronulla-Sutherland Sharks	Thursday, 7:50 pm	Queensland Country Bank Stadium	Adam Gee	17,318
New Zealand Warriors	29–22	Manly Warringah Sea Eagles	Friday, 6:00 pm	Daniel Anderson Stadium	Todd Smith	24,112
Parramatta Eels	12–34	Sydney Roosters	Friday, 8:00 pm	CommBank Stadium	Ashley Klein	20,076
Wests Tigers	24–23	Dolphins	Saturday, 3:00 pm	CommBank Stadium	Ben Cummins	9,245
Gold Coast Titans	14–40	Penrith Panthers	Saturday, 5:30 pm	Cbus Super Stadium	Chris Butler	19,101
St. George Illawarra Dragons	28–38	Melbourne Storm	Saturday, 7:35 pm	WIN Stadium	Peter Gough	8,326
Newcastle Knights	29–10	South Sydney Rabbitohs	Sunday, 2:00 pm	McDonald Jones Stadium	Grant Atkins	29,018
Canberra Raiders	36–24	Canterbury-Bankstown Bulldogs	Sunday, 4:05 pm	GIO Stadium	Gerard Sutton	12,402
Bye: Brisbane Broncos

- Go Media Stadium was temporarily renamed Daniel Anderson Stadium for one day only in this round as a fundraiser for the former New Zealand Warriors coach who became an incomplete quadriplegic after a bodysurfing accident in 2022.

=== Round 26 ===
August 24-27

Home	Score	Away	Match information			
Home	Score	Away	Day & Time	Venue	Referee	Attendance
Penrith Panthers	18–32	Parramatta Eels	Thursday, 7:50 pm	BlueBet Stadium	Ben Cummins	21,525
New Zealand Warriors	18–6	St. George Illawarra Dragons	Friday, 6:00 pm	Go Media Stadium	Peter Gough	25,095
Dolphins	10–34	North Queensland Cowboys	Friday, 8:00 pm	Suncorp Stadium	Gerard Sutton	33,449
Melbourne Storm	37–16	Gold Coast Titans	Saturday, 3:00 pm	AAMI Park	Chris Butler	18,072
Sydney Roosters	32–8	Wests Tigers	Saturday, 5:30 pm	Allianz Stadium	Todd Smith	22,511
Canberra Raiders	18–29	Brisbane Broncos	Saturday, 7:35 pm	GIO Stadium	Adam Gee	19,400
Canterbury-Bankstown Bulldogs	24–42	Manly Warringah Sea Eagles	Sunday, 2:00 pm	Accor Stadium	Liam Kennedy	13,074
Newcastle Knights	32–6	Cronulla-Sutherland Sharks	Sunday, 4:05 pm	McDonald Jones Stadium	Ashley Klein	29,423
Bye: South Sydney Rabbitohs

=== Round 27 ===
August 31-September 3

Home	Score	Away	Match information			
Home	Score	Away	Day & Time	Venue	Referee	Attendance
Brisbane Broncos	22–32	Melbourne Storm	Thursday, 7:50 pm	Suncorp Stadium	Ashley Klein	43,271
Manly Warringah Sea Eagles	54–12	Wests Tigers	Friday, 6:00 pm	4 Pines Park	Belinda Sharpe	16,503
South Sydney Rabbitohs	12–26	Sydney Roosters	Friday, 8:00 pm	Accor Stadium	Adam Gee	36,263
Dolphins	34–10	New Zealand Warriors	Saturday, 3:00 pm	Suncorp Stadium	Gerard Sutton	35,438
Penrith Panthers	44–12	North Queensland Cowboys	Saturday, 5:30 pm	BlueBet Stadium	Todd Smith	21,525
St. George Illawarra Dragons	12–32	Newcastle Knights	Saturday, 7:35 pm	Netstrata Jubilee Stadium	Ben Cummins	10,137
Gold Coast Titans	34–30	Canterbury-Bankstown Bulldogs	Sunday, 2:00 pm	Cbus Super Stadium	Kasey Badger	14,942
Cronulla-Sutherland Sharks	24–6	Canberra Raiders	Sunday, 4:05 pm	PointsBet Stadium	Grant Atkins	12,750
Bye: Parramatta Eels

- South Sydney became the first team since the introduction of the top 8 finals system to miss the finals after leading the competition after 11 rounds.
- Ben Cummins refereed his record 433rd and final match.
- With a total of 190,830 spectators attending across the eight games, this was the second-highest attended round in premiership history.

== Finals series ==
Home	Score	Away	Match Information
Home	Score	Away	Date and Time (Local)	Venue	Referee	Crowd
QUALIFYING & ELIMINATION FINALS
Brisbane Broncos	26–0	Melbourne Storm	8 September 2023, 7:50pm	Suncorp Stadium	Grant Atkins	50,157
Penrith Panthers	32–6	New Zealand Warriors	9 September 2023, 4:05pm	BlueBet Stadium	Adam Gee	21,525
Cronulla-Sutherland Sharks	12–13	Sydney Roosters	9 September 2023, 7:50pm	PointsBet Stadium	Gerard Sutton	12,557
Newcastle Knights	30–28	Canberra Raiders	10 September 2023, 4:05pm	McDonald Jones Stadium	Ashley Klein	29,548
SEMI-FINALS
Melbourne Storm	18–13	Sydney Roosters	15 September 2023, 7:50pm	AAMI Park	Ashley Klein	19,534
New Zealand Warriors	40–10	Newcastle Knights	16 September 2023, 6:05pm (4:05pm AEST)	Go Media Stadium	Adam Gee	26,083
PRELIMINARY FINALS
Penrith Panthers	38–4	Melbourne Storm	22 September 2023, 7:50pm	Accor Stadium	Adam Gee	35,578
Brisbane Broncos	42–12	New Zealand Warriors	23 September 2023, 7:50pm	Suncorp Stadium	Gerard Sutton	52,273
GRAND FINAL
Penrith Panthers	26–24	Brisbane Broncos	1 October 2023, 7:30pm	Accor Stadium	Adam Gee	81,947

- Brisbane ended a 14 game losing streak against Melbourne. It was also their first victory over Melbourne at Suncorp Stadium since round 2, 2009 and the first time Brisbane kept their opponents scoreless in a final.
- Scores in the Newcastle-Canberra were level at full-time, a penalty goal in the second of two 5-min extra time periods winning the game for Newcastle.
- The Preliminary Final crowd at Brisbane vs New Zealand broke the record for the highest crowd for a stand alone NRL game at Suncorp Stadium and is Brisbane's highest crowd in the city since the 1997 Super League Grand Final.
- Penrith recorded the biggest Grand Final comeback in history, coming back from 16 points down at the 56 minute mark to win, beating the Storm's 14 point comeback in 1999.
- Penrith became the first team in the NRL era to win three consecutive premierships and the first since Parramatta in 1981, 1982 and 1983.

=== Bracket ===
Qualifying and elimination finals
9 Sept, BlueBet Stadium
1	Penrith Panthers	32
4	New Zealand Warriors	6
10 Sept, McDonald Jones Stadium
5	Newcastle Knights	30
8	Canberra Raiders	28
9 Sept, PointsBet Stadium
6	Cronulla-Sutherland Sharks	12
7	Sydney Roosters	13
8 Sept, Suncorp Stadium
2	Brisbane Broncos	26
3	Melbourne Storm	0

Semi-finals
16 Sept, Go Media Stadium
New Zealand Warriors	40
Newcastle Knights	10
15 Sept, AAMI Park
Melbourne Storm	18
Sydney Roosters	13

Preliminary finals
22 Sept, Accor Stadium
Penrith Panthers	38
Melbourne Storm	4
23 Sept, Suncorp Stadium
Brisbane Broncos	42
New Zealand Warriors	12

Grand final
1 Oct, Accor Stadium
Penrith Panthers	26
Brisbane Broncos	24

== Stadiums used ==
Stadium	Games played	Teams / Events
4 Pines Park	10	Manly Warringah Sea Eagles
AAMI Park	9	Melbourne Storm
Accor Stadium	18	Canterbury-Bankstown Bulldogs, South Sydney Rabbitohs
Allianz Stadium	9	Sydney Roosters, South Sydney Rabbitohs
Barlow Park	1	South Sydney Rabbitohs
Belmore Sports Ground	2	Canterbury-Bankstown Bulldogs
BlueBet Stadium	11	Penrith Panthers
Carrington Park	1	Penrith Panthers
CommBank Stadium	14	Parramatta Eels, Wests Tigers
Cbus Super Stadium	11	Gold Coast Titans
Campbelltown Sports Stadium	4	Wests Tigers
Central Coast Stadium	1	Sydney Roosters
C.ex Coffs International Stadium	1	Cronulla-Sutherland Sharks
FMG Stadium Waikato	1	Wests Tigers
GIO Stadium	11	Canberra Raiders
Glen Willow Oval	1	Manly Warringah Sea Eagles
Go Media Stadium (Mount Smart Stadium)	9	New Zealand Warriors
Kayo Stadium	3	Dolphins
Leichhardt Oval	3	Wests Tigers
Marvel Stadium	2	Melbourne Storm
McLean Park	1	New Zealand Warriors
McDonald Jones Stadium	12	Newcastle Knights
McDonald's Park	1	Canberra Raiders
Netstrata Jubilee Stadium	5	St. George Illawarra Dragons
Optus Stadium	2	Dolphins, South Sydney Rabbitohs
PointsBet Stadium	10	Cronulla-Sutherland Sharks
Queensland Country Bank Stadium	12	North Queensland Cowboys
Sky Stadium	1	New Zealand Warriors
Suncorp Stadium	24	Brisbane Broncos, Dolphins, Magic Round
Sunshine Coast Stadium	2	Dolphins, South Sydney Rabbitohs
Scully Park	1	Wests Tigers
Salter Oval	1	Canterbury-Bankstown Bulldogs
Sydney Cricket Ground	2	Sydney Roosters
The Gabba	3	Brisbane Broncos
TIO Stadium	1	Parramatta Eels
WIN Stadium	7	St. George Illawarra Dragons
