= John Klein (rugby league) =

Australian rugby league footballer (born 1952)

Personal information
- Born: October 1952 (age 73)

Playing information
- Position: Halfback, Five-eighth
Club
| Years | Team | Pld | T | G | FG | P |
|---|---|---|---|---|---|---|
| 1974–77 | Penrith Panthers | 30 | 9 | 0 | 0 | 27 |
- Relatives: Ashley Klein (son)

John Klein is an Australian former professional rugby league footballer who played in the 1970s and 1980s for the Penrith Panthers.

== Early life ==
John Klein was born in October 1952 in Blacktown. He played his junior football with Blacktown Workers Club before playing with Lalor Park in 1970 and 1971 as a member of that club's winning under 19 and under 21 team in the Parramatta Junior Rugby League competition.

== Career ==
In 1972 he trialled and was graded with the Penrith Panthers in the Sydney competition playing 17 games that season in the 3rd grade side coach by Tom Holland.

In 1973 he was a member of Penrith's under 40’s side which qualified for the play-offs side losing to Balmain Tigs in the eliminating grand final.

In 1974 Klein made his initial first grade appearance against North Sydney at Penrith Park, losing 23-28 in a close encounter. Over the next four seasons, he played a total of 31 games in the top side which was affected by injuries and a loss of form.

At the end of the 1977 season, Klein signed an agreement to Captain-coach Bathurst St Patricks in the Group 10 CRL competition with limited success. He played with St Pats for 3 seasons (1978–81) scoring over 1 try for the club. Retiring halfway through the 1981 season due to injuries.

In 1983, he was transferred in his employment (State Bank) to Quirindi where he came out of retirement and played with "Grasshoppers" for 3 seasons (1983–85). He was appointed Captain-coach for the 1985 season.

In 1986, following another transfer in his employment to Sydney at the end of the '85 season, Klein played for 2 seasons with the Brothers club in the North Sydney competition winning the "A" grade division in 1986. Appointed Captain-coach for the 1987 season he was forced to retire midway through the season due to further injuries.

Klein is the father of NRL referee Ashley Klein.
