= 2022 NRL season results =

Rugby league season

The 2022 NRL season was the 115th of professional rugby league in Australia and the 25th season run by the National Rugby League.

== Regular season ==
All times are in AEDT (UTC+11:00) up until the 3rd of April and AEST (UTC+10:00) from then on.

=== Round 1 ===
Home	Score	Away	Match information			
Home	Score	Away	Date and time	Venue	Referee	Attendance
Penrith Panthers	28 – 6	Manly Warringah Sea Eagles	Thursday, 10 March, 8:05 pm	BlueBet Stadium	Adam Gee	16,901
Canberra Raiders	24 – 19	Cronulla-Sutherland Sharks	Friday, 11 March, 6:00 pm	GIO Stadium	Ben Cummins	15,224
Brisbane Broncos	11 – 4	South Sydney Rabbitohs	Friday, 11 March, 8:05 pm	Suncorp Stadium	Ashley Klein	32,002
Sydney Roosters	6 – 20	Newcastle Knights	Saturday, 12 March, 3:00 pm	Sydney Cricket Ground	Gerard Sutton	14,182
New Zealand Warriors	16 – 28	St. George Illawarra Dragons	Saturday, 12 March, 5:30 pm	Sunshine Coast Stadium	Peter Gough	5,382
Wests Tigers	16 – 26	Melbourne Storm	Saturday, 12 March, 7:35 pm	CommBank Stadium	Chris Sutton	10,025
Parramatta Eels	32 – 28	Gold Coast Titans	Sunday, 13 March, 4:05 pm	CommBank Stadium	Grant Atkins	18,211
North Queensland Cowboys	4 – 6	Canterbury-Bankstown Bulldogs	Sunday, 13 March, 6:15 pm	Queensland Country Bank Stadium	Ben Cummins	12,640

=== Round 2 ===
Home	Score	Away	Match information			
Home	Score	Away	Date and time	Venue	Referee	Attendance
Melbourne Storm	15 – 14	South Sydney Rabbitohs	Thursday, 17 March, 8:05 pm	AAMI Park	Gerard Sutton	13,296
St. George Illawarra Dragons	16 – 20	Penrith Panthers	Friday, 18 March, 6:00 pm	Netstrata Jubilee Stadium	Chris Sutton	10,057
Sydney Roosters	26 – 12	Manly Warringah Sea Eagles	Friday, 18 March, 8:05 pm	Sydney Cricket Ground	Ashley Klein	11,872
Gold Coast Titans	20 – 18	New Zealand Warriors	Saturday, 19 March, 3:00 pm	Cbus Super Stadium	Adam Gee	13,481
Cronulla-Sutherland Sharks	18 – 16	Parramatta Eels	Saturday, 19 March, 5:30 pm	PointsBet Stadium	Peter Gough	11,500
North Queensland Cowboys	26 – 6	Canberra Raiders	Saturday, 19 March, 7:35 pm	Queensland Country Bank Stadium	Grant Atkins	13,864
Newcastle Knights	26 – 4	Wests Tigers	Sunday, 20 March, 4:05 pm	McDonald Jones Stadium	Ben Cummins	23,214
Canterbury-Bankstown Bulldogs	10 – 16	Brisbane Broncos	Sunday, 20 March, 6:15 pm	Accor Stadium	Ziggy Przeklasa-Adamski	13,453

- The match between the Sydney Roosters and Manly Warringah Sea Eagles was originally scheduled to be played at Central Coast Stadium but was moved to the SCG due to venue availability with Sydney's round 18 match against the St. George Illawarra Dragons moved from the SCG to the Central Coast Stadium.

=== Round 3 (Multicultural Round) ===
Home	Score	Away	Match information			
Home	Score	Away	Date and time	Venue	Referee	Attendance
St. George Illawarra Dragons	12 – 36	Cronulla-Sutherland Sharks	Thursday, 24 March, 8:05 pm	WIN Stadium	Gerard Sutton	10,122
Wests Tigers	12 – 16	New Zealand Warriors	Friday, 25 March, 6:00 pm	Campbelltown Stadium	Ziggy Przeklasa-Adamki	7,182
South Sydney Rabbitohs	28 – 16	Sydney Roosters	Friday, 25 March, 8:05 pm	Accor Stadium	Grant Atkins	18,245
Penrith Panthers	38 – 20	Newcastle Knights	Saturday, 26 March, 3:00 pm	Carrington Park	Peter Gough	11,253
Melbourne Storm	24 – 28	Parramatta Eels	Saturday, 26 March, 5:30 pm	AAMI Park	Ashley Klein	15,691
Canberra Raiders	24 – 22	Gold Coast Titans	Saturday, 26 March, 7:35 pm	GIO Stadium	Chris Sutton	11,457
Brisbane Broncos	12 – 38	North Queensland Cowboys	Sunday, 27 March, 4:05 pm	Suncorp Stadium	Adam Gee	37,761
Manly Warringah Sea Eagles	13 – 12	Canterbury-Bankstown Bulldogs	Sunday, 27 March, 6:15 pm	Brookvale Oval	Ben Cummins	13,261

- The crowd of 11,253 at the Penrith vs Newcastle match is the highest NRL attendance in Bathurst's history.
- Canberra equaled their best ever comeback after being down 22 – 0 against the Gold Coast Titans.

=== Round 4 ===
Home	Score	Away	Match information			
Home	Score	Away	Date and time	Venue	Referee	Attendance
Gold Coast Titans	8 – 6	Wests Tigers	Thursday, 31 March, 8:05 pm	Cbus Super Stadium	Grant Atkins	8,774
Cronulla-Sutherland Sharks	18 – 0	Newcastle Knights	Friday, 1 April, 6:00 pm	PointsBet Stadium	Ben Cummins	8,927
Penrith Panthers	26 – 12	South Sydney Rabbitohs	Friday, 1 April, 8:05 pm	BlueBet Stadium	Ashley Klein	20,521
New Zealand Warriors	20 – 6	Brisbane Broncos	Saturday, 2 April, 3:00 pm	Moreton Daily Stadium	Chris Sutton	9,620
Manly Warringah Sea Eagles	25 – 6	Canberra Raiders	Saturday, 2 April, 5:30 pm	Glen Willow Regional Sports Stadium	Ziggy Przeklasa-Adamski	6,972
North Queensland Cowboys	4 – 28	Sydney Roosters	Saturday, 2 April, 7:35 pm	Queensland Country Bank Stadium	Gerard Sutton	17,929
Melbourne Storm	44 – 0	Canterbury-Bankstown Bulldogs	Sunday, 3 April, 4:05 pm	AAMI Park	Adam Gee	13,437
Parramatta Eels	48 – 14	St. George Illawarra Dragons	Sunday, 3 April, 6:15 pm	CommBank Stadium	Todd Smith	19,711

=== Round 5 ===
Home	Score	Away	Match information			
Home	Score	Away	Date and time	Venue	Referee	Attendance
Newcastle Knights	6 – 30	Manly Warringah Sea Eagles	Thursday, 7 April, 7:50 pm	McDonald Jones Stadium	Ashley Klein	9,472
New Zealand Warriors	25 – 24	North Queensland Cowboys	Friday, 8 April, 6:00 pm	Moreton Daily Stadium	Todd Smith	6,254
Brisbane Broncos	20 – 24	Sydney Roosters	Friday, 8 April, 7:55 pm	Suncorp Stadium	Grant Atkins	23,508
Canberra Raiders	16 – 30	Melbourne Storm	Saturday, 9 April, 3:00 pm	McDonald's Park	Gerard Sutton	8,133
South Sydney Rabbitohs	24 – 12	St. George Illawarra Dragons	Saturday, 9 April, 5:30 pm	Accor Stadium	Ben Cummins	11,332
Gold Coast Titans	20 – 26	Parramatta Eels	Saturday, 9 April, 7:35 pm	Cbus Super Stadium	Peter Gough	14,478
Cronulla-Sutherland Sharks	30 – 4	Wests Tigers	Sunday, 10 April, 4:05 pm	PointsBet Stadium	Adam Gee	11,500
Canterbury-Bankstown Bulldogs	12 – 32	Penrith Panthers	Sunday, 10 April, 6:15 pm	CommBank Stadium	Chris Butler	11,157

=== Round 6 (Easter Round) ===
Home	Score	Away	Match information			
Home	Score	Away	Date and time	Venue	Referee	Attendance
Canberra Raiders	12 – 18	North Queensland Cowboys	Thursday, 14 April, 7:50 pm	GIO Stadium	Ashley Klein	11,854
South Sydney Rabbitohs	36 – 16	Canterbury-Bankstown Bulldogs	Friday, 15 April, 4:00 pm	Accor Stadium	Gerard Sutton	30,194
Penrith Panthers	40 – 12	Brisbane Broncos	Friday, 15 April, 7:55 pm	BlueBet Stadium	Adam Gee	19,406
Manly Warringah Sea Eagles	26 – 18	Gold Coast Titans	Saturday, 16 April, 5:30 pm	Brookvale Oval	Todd Smith	16,220
Melbourne Storm	34 – 18	Cronulla-Sutherland Sharks	Saturday, 16 April, 7:35 pm	AAMI Park	Grant Atkins	16,286
Sydney Roosters	22 – 14	New Zealand Warriors	Sunday, 17 April, 2:00 pm	Sydney Cricket Ground	Ziggy Przeklasa-Adamski	11,217
St. George Illawarra Dragons	21 – 16	Newcastle Knights	Sunday, 17 April, 4:05 pm	WIN Stadium	Ben Cummins	11,113
Parramatta Eels	20 – 21	Wests Tigers	Monday, 18 April, 4:00 pm	CommBank Stadium	Chris Butler	28,336

=== Round 7 (ANZAC Round) ===
Home	Score	Away	Match information			
Home	Score	Away	Date and time	Venue	Referee	Attendance
Cronulla-Sutherland Sharks	34 – 22	Manly Warringah Sea Eagles	Thursday, 21 April, 7:50 pm	PointsBet Stadium	Gerard Sutton	9,611
Brisbane Broncos	34 – 14	Canterbury-Bankstown Bulldogs	Friday, 22 April, 7:55 pm	Suncorp Stadium	Peter Gough	23,243
North Queensland Cowboys	30 – 4	Gold Coast Titans	Saturday, 23 April, 5:30 pm	Queensland Country Bank Stadium	Chris Butler	14,547
Wests Tigers	23 – 22	South Sydney Rabbitohs	Saturday, 23 April, 7:35 pm	CommBank Stadium	Ziggy Przeklasa-Adamski	14,251
Newcastle Knights	2 – 39	Parramatta Eels	Sunday, 24 April, 2:00 pm	McDonald Jones Stadium	Ashley Klein	25,196
Penrith Panthers	36 – 6	Canberra Raiders	Sunday, 24 April, 4:05 pm	BlueBet Stadium	Grant Atkins	20,612
St. George Illawarra Dragons	14 – 12	Sydney Roosters	Monday, 25 April, 4:00 pm	Sydney Cricket Ground	Adam Gee	35,273
Melbourne Storm	70 – 10	New Zealand Warriors	Monday, 25 April, 7:00 pm	AAMI Park	Chris Sutton	22,696

=== Round 8 ===
Home	Score	Away	Match information			
Home	Score	Away	Date and time	Venue	Referee	Attendance
Brisbane Broncos	16 – 7	Cronulla-Sutherland Sharks	Thursday, 28 April, 7:50 pm	Suncorp Stadium	Ashley Klein	16,740
Gold Coast Titans	4 – 18	Penrith Panthers	Friday, 29 April, 6:00 pm	Cbus Super Stadium	Peter Gough	14,102
South Sydney Rabbitohs	40 – 22	Manly Warringah Sea Eagles	Friday, 29 April, 7:55 pm	Central Coast Stadium	Grant Atkins	17,284
New Zealand Warriors	21 – 20	Canberra Raiders	Saturday, 30 April, 3:00 pm	Moreton Daily Stadium	Chris Butler	6,326
Canterbury-Bankstown Bulldogs	16 – 12	Sydney Roosters	Saturday, 30 April, 5:30 pm	Accor Stadium	Ben Cummins	9,544
Parramatta Eels	4 – 35	North Queensland Cowboys	Saturday, 30 April, 7:35 pm	TIO Stadium	Todd Smith	10,017
Newcastle Knights	2 – 50	Melbourne Storm	Sunday, 1 May, 2:00 pm	McDonald Jones Stadium	Liam Kennedy	15,895
St. George Illawarra Dragons	12 – 6	Wests Tigers	Sunday, 1 May, 4:05 pm	WIN Stadium	Gerard Sutton	16,110

=== Round 9 ===
Home	Score	Away	Match information			
Home	Score	Away	Date and time	Venue	Referee	Attendance
South Sydney Rabbitohs	12 – 32	Brisbane Broncos	Thursday, 5 May, 7:50 pm	Accor Stadium	Grant Atkins	9,242
Canberra Raiders	14 – 4	Canterbury-Bankstown Bulldogs	Friday, 6 May, 6:00 pm	GIO Stadium	Ben Cummins	12,890
Penrith Panthers	20 – 22	Parramatta Eels	Friday, 6 May, 7:55 pm	BlueBet Stadium	Gerard Sutton	21,548
Manly Warringah Sea Eagles	36 – 22	Wests Tigers	Saturday, 7 May, 3:00 pm	Brookvale Oval	Adam Gee	17,385
Sydney Roosters	44 – 16	Gold Coast Titans	Saturday, 7 May, 5:30 pm	BB Print Stadium	Chris Butler	5,527
North Queensland Cowboys	36 – 16	Newcastle Knights	Saturday, 7 May, 7:35 pm	Queensland Country Bank Stadium	Liam Kennedy	14,463
Melbourne Storm	42 – 6	St. George Illawarra Dragons	Sunday, 8 May, 2:00 pm	AAMI Park	Peter Gough	11,723
Cronulla-Sutherland Sharks	29 – 10	New Zealand Warriors	Sunday, 8 May, 4:05 pm	PointsBet Stadium	Todd Smith	9,915

- The Cronulla Sharks became the first team in 14 years, since Manly defeated Canberra in 2008, to win a game when reduced to 12 players.

=== Round 10 (Magic Round) ===
Home	Score	Away	Match information			
Home	Score	Away	Date and time	Venue	Referee	Attendance
Canterbury-Bankstown Bulldogs	6 – 16	Newcastle Knights	Friday, 13 May, 6:00 pm	Suncorp Stadium	Peter Gough	30,220
Manly Warringah Sea Eagles	0 – 38	Brisbane Broncos	Friday, 13 May, 8:05 pm	Suncorp Stadium	Grant Atkins	40,267
New Zealand Warriors	30 – 32	South Sydney Rabbitohs	Saturday, 14 May, 3:00 pm	Suncorp Stadium	Ben Cummins	30,503
Gold Coast Titans	20 – 16	St. George Illawarra Dragons	Saturday, 14 May, 5:30 pm	Suncorp Stadium	Todd Smith	41,593
Melbourne Storm	6 – 32	Penrith Panthers	Saturday, 14 May, 7:45 pm	Suncorp Stadium	Ashley Klein	46,454
Cronulla-Sutherland Sharks	10 – 30	Canberra Raiders	Sunday, 15 May, 1:50 pm	Suncorp Stadium	Liam Kennedy	30,453
Sydney Roosters	31 – 24	Parramatta Eels	Sunday, 15 May, 4:05 pm	Suncorp Stadium	Adam Gee	43,401
Wests Tigers	12 – 36	North Queensland Cowboys	Sunday, 15 May, 6:25 pm	Suncorp Stadium	Gerard Sutton	43,401

- Manly were held scoreless for the first time since the 2013 Qualifying Final, ending a 208-game streak of scoring points in games, their longest streak in club history.

=== Round 11 ===
Home	Score	Away	Match information			
Home	Score	Away	Date and time	Venue	Referee	Attendance
Newcastle Knights	12 – 36	Brisbane Broncos	Thursday, 19 May, 7:50 pm	McDonald Jones Stadium	Adam Gee	13,312
Wests Tigers	36 – 22	Canterbury-Bankstown Bulldogs	Friday, 20 May, 6:00 pm	Leichhardt Oval	Ziggy Przeklasa-Adamski	15,124
Parramatta Eels	22 – 20	Manly Warringah Sea Eagles	Friday, 20 May, 7:55 pm	CommBank Stadium	Ben Cummins	18,778
St. George Illawarra Dragons	24 – 18	New Zealand Warriors	Saturday, 21 May, 3:00 pm	Netstrata Jubilee Stadium	Chris Sutton	7,147
North Queensland Cowboys	36 – 6	Melbourne Storm	Saturday, 21 May, 5:30 pm	Queensland Country Bank Stadium	Grant Atkins	22,728
Sydney Roosters	12 – 32	Penrith Panthers	Saturday, 21 May, 7:35 pm	Sydney Cricket Ground	Gerard Sutton	14,482
South Sydney Rabbitohs	12 – 32	Canberra Raiders	Sunday, 22 May, 2:00 pm	Apex Oval	Peter Gough	11,124
Gold Coast Titans	18 – 25	Cronulla-Sutherland Sharks	Sunday, 22 May, 4:05 pm	Cbus Super Stadium	Ashley Klein	9,882

=== Round 12 (Indigenous Round) ===
Home	Score	Away	Match information			
Home	Score	Away	Date and time	Venue	Referee	Attendance
Melbourne Storm	28 – 8	Manly Warringah Sea Eagles	Thursday, 26 May, 7:50 pm	AAMI Park	Adam Gee	10,168
Penrith Panthers	22 – 0	North Queensland Cowboys	Friday, 27 May, 6:00 pm	BlueBet Stadium	Ashley Klein	17,125
Brisbane Broncos	35 – 24	Gold Coast Titans	Friday, 27 May, 7:55 pm	Suncorp Stadium	Gerard Sutton	32,864
New Zealand Warriors	16 – 24	Newcastle Knights	Saturday, 28 May, 3:00 pm	Moreton Daily Stadium	Peter Gough	4,265
South Sydney Rabbitohs	44 – 18	Wests Tigers	Saturday, 28 May, 5:30 pm	Accor Stadium	Chris Sutton	13,585
Cronulla-Sutherland Sharks	16 – 36	Sydney Roosters	Saturday, 28 May, 7:35 pm	PointsBet Stadium	Grant Atkins	11,500
Canterbury-Bankstown Bulldogs	24 – 34	St. George Illawarra Dragons	Sunday, 29 May, 2:00 pm	Belmore Sports Ground	Ben Cummins	16,991
Canberra Raiders	20 – 28	Parramatta Eels	Sunday, 29 May, 4:05 pm	GIO Stadium	Todd Smith	16,244

=== Round 13 ===
Home	Score	Away	Match information			
Home	Score	Away	Date and time	Venue	Referee	Attendance
Gold Coast Titans	6 – 32	North Queensland Cowboys	Thursday, 2 June, 7:50 pm	Cbus Super Stadium	Gerard Sutton	10,334
Penrith Panthers	30 – 18	Canterbury-Bankstown Bulldogs	Friday, 3 June, 7:55 pm	BlueBet Stadium	Todd Smith	16,906
Manly Warringah Sea Eagles	44 – 12	New Zealand Warriors	Saturday, 4 June, 7:35 pm	Brookvale Oval	Grant Atkins	9,248
Canberra Raiders	22 – 16	Sydney Roosters	Sunday, 5 June, 4:05 pm	GIO Stadium	Adam Gee	6,492
Bye: Brisbane Broncos, St. George Illawarra Dragons, Parramatta Eels, Newcastle Knights, South Sydney Rabbitohs, Cronulla-Sutherland Sharks, Melbourne Storm, & Wests Tigers.

=== Round 14 ===
Home	Score	Away	Match information			
Home	Score	Away	Date and time	Venue	Referee	Attendance
North Queensland Cowboys	31 – 12	St. George Illawarra Dragons	Friday, 10 June, 7:55 pm	Queensland Country Bank Stadium	Todd Smith	14,683
Gold Coast Titans	16 – 30	South Sydney Rabbitohs	Saturday, 11 June, 3:00 pm	Cbus Super Stadium	Adam Gee	14,290
Sydney Roosters	18 – 26	Melbourne Storm	Saturday, 11 June, 5:30 pm	Sydney Cricket Ground	Gerard Sutton	12,925
Brisbane Broncos	24 – 18	Canberra Raiders	Saturday, 11 June, 7:35 pm	Suncorp Stadium	Grant Atkins	28,142
Wests Tigers	4 – 30	Manly Warringah Sea Eagles	Sunday, 12 June, 2:00 pm	Campbelltown Stadium	Peter Gough	10,231
Newcastle Knights	6 – 42	Penrith Panthers	Sunday, 12 June, 4:05 pm	McDonald Jones Stadium	Ben Cummins	21,332
New Zealand Warriors	16 – 38	Cronulla-Sutherland Sharks	Sunday, 12 June, 6:15 pm	Moreton Daily Stadium	Chris Sutton	3,560
Canterbury-Bankstown Bulldogs	34 – 4	Parramatta Eels	Monday, 13 June, 4:00 pm	Accor Stadium	Ashley Klein	20,184

- Brent Naden became the first Wests Tigers player to be sent off since 2002.

=== Round 15 ===
Home	Score	Away	Match information			
Home	Score	Away	Date and time	Venue	Referee	Attendance
St. George Illawarra Dragons	32 – 12	South Sydney Rabbitohs	Thursday, 16 June, 7:50 pm	WIN Stadium	Grant Atkins	11,257
Manly Warringah Sea Eagles	26 – 28	North Queensland Cowboys	Friday, 17 June, 6:00 pm	Brookvale Oval	Gerard Sutton	9,266
Melbourne Storm	32 – 20	Brisbane Broncos	Friday, 17 June, 7:55 pm	AAMI Park	Adam Gee	19,253
Cronulla-Sutherland Sharks	18 – 10	Gold Coast Titans	Saturday, 18 June, 3:00 pm	C.ex Coffs International Stadium	Chris Sutton	9,058
New Zealand Warriors	6 – 40	Penrith Panthers	Saturday, 18 June, 5:30 pm	Moreton Daily Stadium	Peter Gough	8,127
Parramatta Eels	26 – 16	Sydney Roosters	Saturday, 18 June, 7:35 pm	CommBank Stadium	Todd Smith	21,757
Canberra Raiders	20 – 18	Newcastle Knights	Sunday, 19 June, 2:00 pm	GIO Stadium	Ashley Klein	12,457
Canterbury-Bankstown Bulldogs	36 – 12	Wests Tigers	Sunday, 19 June, 4:05 pm	CommBank Stadium	Ben Cummins	14,806

=== Round 16 ===
Home	Score	Away	Match information			
Home	Score	Away	Date and time	Venue	Referee	Attendance
Manly Warringah Sea Eagles	36 – 30	Melbourne Storm	Thursday, 30 June, 7:50 pm	Brookvale Oval	Grant Atkins	8,618
Newcastle Knights	38 – 12	Gold Coast Titans	Friday, 1 July, 6:00 pm	McDonald Jones Stadium	Chris Butler	8,578
Penrith Panthers	26 – 18	Sydney Roosters	Friday, 1 July, 7:55 pm	BlueBet Stadium	Gerard Sutton	16,725
Canterbury-Bankstown Bulldogs	6 – 18	Cronulla-Sutherland Sharks	Saturday, 2 July, 3:00 pm	CommBank Stadium	Ashley Klein	8,837
North Queensland Cowboys	40 – 26	Brisbane Broncos	Saturday, 2 July, 5:30 pm	Queensland Country Bank Stadium	Adam Gee	23,531
South Sydney Rabbitohs	30 – 12	Parramatta Eels	Saturday, 2 July, 7:35 pm	Accor Stadium	Ben Cummins	10,012
New Zealand Warriors	22 – 2	Wests Tigers	Sunday, 3 July, 2:00 pm	Mount Smart Stadium	Chris Sutton	26,009
St. George Illawarra Dragons	12 – 10	Canberra Raiders	Sunday, 3 July, 4:05 pm	WIN Stadium	Peter Gough	7,069

- Edrick Lee became the first player in Newcastle Knights history to score 5 tries in a single match.
- The Warriors vs Tigers game was the first NRL game played in New Zealand since Round 24, 2019.

=== Round 17 ===
Home	Score	Away	Match information			
Home	Score	Away	Date and time	Venue	Referee	Attendance
Cronulla-Sutherland Sharks	28 – 6	Melbourne Storm	Thursday, 7 July, 7:50 pm	PointsBet Stadium	Adam Gee	7,688
Newcastle Knights	28 – 40	South Sydney Rabbitohs	Friday, 8 July, 7:55 pm	McDonald Jones Stadium	Todd Smith	18,621
Wests Tigers	20 – 28	Parramatta Eels	Saturday, 9 July, 7:35 pm	Leichhardt Oval	Chris Butler	13,214
Brisbane Broncos	32 – 18	St. George Illawarra Dragons	Sunday, 10 July, 4:05 pm	Suncorp Stadium	Grant Atkins	29,234
Bye: Canterbury-Bankstown Bulldogs, North Queensland Cowboys, Penrith Panthers, Canberra Raiders, Sydney Roosters, Manly Warringah Sea Eagles, Gold Coast Titans, & New Zealand Warriors.

=== Round 18 ===
Home	Score	Away	Match information			
Home	Score	Away	Date and time	Venue	Referee	Attendance
North Queensland Cowboys	12 – 26	Cronulla-Sutherland Sharks	Friday, 15 July, 6:00 pm	Queensland Country Bank Stadium	Adam Gee	15,982
Parramatta Eels	28 – 18	New Zealand Warriors	Friday, 15 July, 7:55 pm	CommBank Stadium	Todd Smith	12,279
Sydney Roosters	54 – 26	St. George Illawarra Dragons	Saturday, 16 July, 3:00 pm	Central Coast Stadium	Grant Atkins	15,721
Manly Warringah Sea Eagles	42 – 12	Newcastle Knights	Saturday, 16 July, 5:30 pm	Brookvale Oval	Gerard Sutton	15,896
Gold Coast Titans	12 – 16	Brisbane Broncos	Saturday, 16 July, 7:35 pm	Cbus Super Stadium	Chris Sutton	19,245
Wests Tigers	16 – 18	Penrith Panthers	Sunday, 17 July, 2:00 pm	CommBank Stadium	Peter Gough	11,464
Melbourne Storm	16 – 20	Canberra Raiders	Sunday, 17 July, 4:05 pm	AAMI Park	Ashley Klein	16,106
Canterbury-Bankstown Bulldogs	28 – 36	South Sydney Rabbitohs	Sunday, 17 July, 6:15 pm	Accor Stadium	Chris Butler	19,126

=== Round 19 ===
Home	Score	Away	Match information			
Home	Score	Away	Date and time	Venue	Referee	Attendance
Parramatta Eels	14 – 36	Brisbane Broncos	Thursday, 21 July, 7:50 pm	CommBank Stadium	Gerard Sutton	11,017
St. George Illawarra Dragons	20 – 6	Manly Warringah Sea Eagles	Friday, 22 July, 6:00 pm	Netstrata Jubilee Stadium	Adam Gee	7,137
Newcastle Knights	12 – 42	Sydney Roosters	Friday, 22 July, 7:55 pm	McDonald Jones Stadium	Peter Gough	13,701
Canberra Raiders	26 – 14	New Zealand Warriors	Saturday, 23 July, 3:00 pm	GIO Stadium	Chris Sutton	11,915
Penrith Panthers	20 – 10	Cronulla-Sutherland Sharks	Saturday, 23 July, 5:30 pm	BlueBet Stadium	Ashley Klein	17,426
South Sydney Rabbitohs	24 – 12	Melbourne Storm	Saturday, 23 July, 7:35 pm	Accor Stadium	Todd Smith	11,217
Canterbury-Bankstown Bulldogs	36 – 26	Gold Coast Titans	Sunday, 24 July, 2:00 pm	CommBank Stadium	Ben Cummins	11,726
North Queensland Cowboys	27 – 26	Wests Tigers	Sunday, 24 July, 4:05 pm	Queensland Country Bank Stadium	Chris Butler	14,910

=== Round 20 ===
Home	Score	Away	Match information			
Home	Score	Away	Date and time	Venue	Referee	Attendance
Manly Warringah Sea Eagles	10 – 20	Sydney Roosters	Thursday, 28 July, 7:50 pm	Brookvale Oval	Grant Atkins	12,187
New Zealand Warriors	12 – 24	Melbourne Storm	Friday, 29 July, 6:00 pm	Mount Smart Stadium	Peter Gough	18,395
Parramatta Eels	34 – 10	Penrith Panthers	Friday, 29 July, 7:55 pm	CommBank Stadium	Todd Smith	26,912
Gold Coast Titans	24 – 36	Canberra Raiders	Saturday, 30 July, 3:00 pm	Cbus Super Stadium	Ben Cummins	12,461
Cronulla-Sutherland Sharks	21 – 20	South Sydney Rabbitohs	Saturday, 30 July, 5:30 pm	PointsBet Stadium	Gerard Sutton	11,492
Brisbane Broncos	18 – 32	Wests Tigers	Saturday, 30 July, 7:35 pm	Suncorp Stadium	Adam Gee	32,909
Newcastle Knights	10 – 24	Canterbury-Bankstown Bulldogs	Sunday, 31 July, 2:00 pm	McDonald Jones Stadium	Chris Butler	19,813
St. George Illawarra Dragons	8 – 34	North Queensland Cowboys	Sunday, 31 July, 4:05 pm	Netstrata Jubilee Stadium	Chris Sutton	9,517

=== Round 21 ===
Home	Score	Away	Match information			
Home	Score	Away	Date and time	Venue	Referee	Attendance
Sydney Roosters	34 – 16	Brisbane Broncos	Thursday, 4 August, 7:50 pm	Sydney Cricket Ground	Todd Smith	10,495
Melbourne Storm	32 – 14	Gold Coast Titans	Friday, 5 August, 6:00 pm	AAMI Park	Peter Gough	10,869
Manly Warringah Sea Eagles	20 – 36	Parramatta Eels	Friday, 5 August, 7:55 pm	Brookvale Oval	Gerard Sutton	17,134
South Sydney Rabbitohs	48 – 10	New Zealand Warriors	Saturday, 6 August, 3:00 pm	Sunshine Coast Stadium	Ben Cummins	8,911
Canberra Raiders	6 – 26	Penrith Panthers	Saturday, 6 August, 5:30 pm	GIO Stadium	Grant Atkins	16,912
Cronulla-Sutherland Sharks	24 – 18	St. George Illawarra Dragons	Saturday, 6 August, 7:35 pm	PointsBet Stadium	Ashley Klein	11,427
Canterbury-Bankstown Bulldogs	14 – 28	North Queensland Cowboys	Sunday, 7 August, 2:00 pm	Salter Oval	Adam Gee	8,521
Wests Tigers	10 – 14	Newcastle Knights	Sunday, 7 August, 4:05 pm	Campbelltown Stadium	Chris Sutton	9,621

- Salter Oval in Bundaberg, along with the city itself, are scheduled to host their first ever NRL match for premiership points.

=== Round 22 ===
Home	Score	Away	Match information			
Home	Score	Away	Date and time	Venue	Referee	Attendance
Penrith Panthers	0 – 16	Melbourne Storm	Thursday, 11 August, 7:50 pm	BlueBet Stadium	Gerard Sutton	15,612
New Zealand Warriors	42 – 18	Canterbury-Bankstown Bulldogs	Friday, 12 August, 6:00 pm	Mount Smart Stadium	Chris Butler	16,212
Parramatta Eels	0 – 26	South Sydney Rabbitohs	Friday, 12 August, 7:55 pm	CommBank Stadium	Grant Atkins	22,958
Sydney Roosters	32 – 18	North Queensland Cowboys	Saturday, 13 August, 3:00 pm	Sydney Cricket Ground	Ashley Klein	15,219
Wests Tigers	12 – 36	Cronulla-Sutherland Sharks	Saturday, 13 August, 5:30 pm	Scully Park	Ben Cummins	10,048
Brisbane Broncos	28 – 10	Newcastle Knights	Saturday, 13 August, 7:35 pm	Suncorp Stadium	Peter Gough	25,742
Canberra Raiders	24 – 22	St. George Illawarra Dragons	Sunday, 14 August, 2:00 pm	GIO Stadium	Adam Gee	11,216
Gold Coast Titans	44 – 24	Manly Warringah Sea Eagles	Sunday, 14 August, 4:05 pm	Cbus Super Stadium	Chris Sutton	11,753

=== Round 23 ===
Home	Score	Away	Match information			
Home	Score	Away	Date and time	Venue	Referee	Attendance
South Sydney Rabbitohs	22 – 26	Penrith Panthers	Thursday, 18 August, 7:50 pm	Accor Stadium	Adam Gee	15,206
North Queensland Cowboys	48 – 4	New Zealand Warriors	Friday, 19 August, 6:00 pm	Queensland Country Bank Stadium	Chris Butler	17,404
Brisbane Broncos	12 – 60	Melbourne Storm	Friday, 19 August, 7:55 pm	Suncorp Stadium	Todd Smith	42,612
Parramatta Eels	42 – 6	Canterbury-Bankstown Bulldogs	Saturday, 20 August, 3:00 pm	CommBank Stadium	Ashley Klein	26,451
Manly Warringah Sea Eagles	6 – 40	Cronulla-Sutherland Sharks	Saturday, 20 August, 5:30 pm	Brookvale Oval	Gerard Sutton	12,243
Sydney Roosters	72 – 6	Wests Tigers	Saturday, 20 August, 7:35 pm	Sydney Cricket Ground	Ben Cummins	14,939
St. George Illawarra Dragons	46 – 26	Gold Coast Titans	Sunday, 21 August, 2:00 pm	WIN Stadium	Liam Kennedy	12,348
Newcastle Knights	22 – 28	Canberra Raiders	Sunday, 21 August, 4:05 pm	McDonald Jones Stadium	Grant Atkins	16,768

- This was the NRL highest scoring round, of a total of 466 points scored by the 16 teams combined.
- The Sydney Roosters vs Wests Tigers saw the Roosters record their biggest win since round 6, 1935, their 2nd highest score ever, scoring the most tries in a game since round 13, 1982 as well as the overall biggest ever win and score at the SCG while the Wests Tigers recorded their biggest ever loss since their formation in 2000 with the loss being the worst for either side of the venture since the Western Suburbs Magpies loss in round 8, 1910.

=== Round 24 ===
Home	Score	Away	Match information			
Home	Score	Away	Date and time	Venue	Referee	Attendance
Brisbane Broncos	6 – 53	Parramatta Eels	Thursday, 25 August, 7:50 pm	Suncorp Stadium	Grant Atkins	30,371
Penrith Panthers	46 – 12	New Zealand Warriors	Friday, 26 August, 6:00 pm	BlueBet Stadium	Chris Butler	17,025
Melbourne Storm	14 – 18	Sydney Roosters	Friday, 26 August, 7:55 pm	AAMI Park	Adam Gee	25,308
Canberra Raiders	48 – 6	Manly Warringah Sea Eagles	Saturday, 27 August, 3:00 pm	GIO Stadium	Ashley Klein	16,697
Cronulla-Sutherland Sharks	16 – 0	Canterbury-Bankstown Bulldogs	Saturday, 27 August, 5:30 pm	PointsBet Stadium	Todd Smith	11,500
South Sydney Rabbitohs	20 – 10	North Queensland Cowboys	Saturday, 27 August, 7:35 pm	Accor Stadium	Gerard Sutton	15,264
Wests Tigers	22 – 24	St. George Illawarra Dragons	Sunday, 28 August, 2:00 pm	CommBank Stadium	Liam Kennedy	9,789
Gold Coast Titans	36 – 26	Newcastle Knights	Sunday, 28 August, 4:05 pm	Cbus Super Stadium	Ben Cummins	11,816

=== Round 25 ===
Home	Score	Away	Match information			
Home	Score	Away	Date and time	Venue	Referee	Attendance
Parramatta Eels	22 – 14	Melbourne Storm	Thursday, 1 September, 7:50 pm	CommBank Stadium	Ashley Klein	23,758
Canterbury-Bankstown Bulldogs	21 – 20	Manly Warringah Sea Eagles	Friday, 2 September, 6:00 pm	Accor Stadium	Peter Gough	13,648
Sydney Roosters	26 – 16	South Sydney Rabbitohs	Friday, 2 September, 7:55 pm	Allianz Stadium	Grant Atkins	41,906
New Zealand Warriors	26 – 27	Gold Coast Titans	Saturday, 3 September, 3:00 pm	Mount Smart Stadium	Ziggy Przeklasa-Adamski	20,512
St. George Illawarra Dragons	22 – 12	Brisbane Broncos	Saturday, 3 September, 5:30 pm	Netstrata Jubilee Stadium	Ben Cummins	8,247
North Queensland Cowboys	38 – 8	Penrith Panthers	Saturday, 3 September, 7:35 pm	Queensland Country Bank Stadium	Todd Smith	23,840
Newcastle Knights	16 – 38	Cronulla-Sutherland Sharks	Sunday, 4 September, 2:00 pm	McDonald Jones Stadium	Chris Sutton	16,808
Wests Tigers	10 – 56	Canberra Raiders	Sunday, 4 September, 4:05 pm	Leichhardt Oval	Gerard Sutton	10,041

== Finals series ==
Home	Score	Away	Match Information
Home	Score	Away	Date and Time (Local)	Venue	Referees	Crowd
QUALIFYING & ELIMINATION FINALS
Penrith Panthers	27 – 8	Parramatta Eels	9 September 2022, 7:50 pm	BlueBet Stadium	Gerard Sutton	21,863
Melbourne Storm	20 – 28	Canberra Raiders	10 September 2022, 5:40 pm	AAMI Park	Grant Atkins	20,838
Cronulla-Sutherland Sharks	30 – 32	North Queensland Cowboys	10 September 2022, 7:50 pm	Pointsbet Stadium	Adam Gee	12,447
Sydney Roosters	14 – 30	South Sydney Rabbitohs	11 September 2022, 4:05 pm	Allianz Stadium	Ashley Klein	39,816
SEMI FINALS
Parramatta Eels	40 – 4	Canberra Raiders	16 September 2022, 7:50 pm	CommBank Stadium	Ashley Klein	29,134
Cronulla-Sutherland Sharks	12 – 38	South Sydney Rabbitohs	17 September 2022, 8:00 pm	Allianz Stadium	Grant Atkins	39,733
PRELIMINARY FINALS
North Queensland Cowboys	20 – 24	Parramatta Eels	23 September 2022, 7:50 pm	Queensland Country Bank Stadium	Grant Atkins	25,372
Penrith Panthers	32 – 12	South Sydney Rabbitohs	24 September 2022, 7:50 pm	Accor Stadium	Ashley Klein	50,034
GRAND FINAL
Penrith Panthers	28 – 12	Parramatta Eels	Sunday, 2 October, 7:30 pm	Accor Stadium	Ashley Klein	82,415

- The crowd of 21,863 for the first qualifying final between Penrith and Parramatta is the highest crowd at BlueBet Stadium since round 19, 2010.
- The Sydney Roosters vs South Sydney Rabbitohs had seven players sin binned with two players sin binned twice, the most in a game since the formation of the National Rugby League in 1998.
- A moments silence was held prior to all week one games following the death of Queen Elizabeth II.
- The Parramatta Eels have won their second Semi Finals since 2009.
- The crowd of 25,372 for the first preliminary final between North Queensland and Parramatta is the highest crowd for an NRL game in Townsville since round 23, 2011. This would be broken in round 21, 2026.
- The crowd of 50,034 for the second preliminary final between Penrith and South Sydney is the highest crowd for an NRL game in Olympic Park since Preliminary Finals.
- The crowd of 82,415 for the Grand Final is the highest crowd Penrith have played in front of, and the highest crowd for Parramatta since the 2009 Grand Final.

=== Bracket ===
Qualifying and elimination finals
9 Sept, BlueBet Stadium
1	Penrith	27
4	Parramatta	8
10 Sept, AAMI Park
5	Melbourne	20
8	Canberra	28
11 Sept, Allianz Stadium
6	Sydney	14
7	South Sydney	30
10 Sept, PointsBet Stadium
2	Cronulla-Sutherland	30
3	North Queensland	32

Semi-finals
16 Sept, CommBank Stadium
Parramatta	40
Canberra	4
17 Sept, Allianz Stadium
Cronulla-Sutherland	12
South Sydney	38

Preliminary finals
24 Sept, Accor Stadium
Penrith	32
South Sydney	12
23 Sept, Queensland Country Bank Stadium
North Queensland	20
Parramatta	24

Grand final
2 Oct, Accor Stadium
Penrith	28
Parramatta	12
