= 2021 NSW Cup season =

2021 Knock on Effect New South Wales Cup
- Duration: 12 March – 26 September 2021
- Teams: 11
- Broadcast partners: Fox League

The 2021 season of the Knock on Effect New South Wales Cup was curtailed due to lockdowns introduced to combat the Delta variant of the COVID-19 pandemic in New South Wales. Fifteen of a scheduled 24 rounds were played, with the last completed round of matches occurring on the weekend of 19–20 June 2021.

== Knock on Effect New South Wales Cup ==
=== Teams ===
There were 11 teams in 2021.

Colours	Club	Home ground(s)	Head coach
	Blacktown Workers Sea Eagles	Lottoland, HE Laybutt Field	Matt Ballin
	Canberra Raiders	GIO Stadium, Raiders Belconnen	N/A
	Mount Pritchard Mounties	Aubrey Keech Reserve, Stadium Australia	Michael Potter
	Newcastle Knights	McDonald Jones Stadium	Andrew Ryan
	Newtown Jets	Henson Park	Greg Matterson
	North Sydney Bears	North Sydney Oval	Jason Taylor
	Parramatta Eels	Bankwest Stadium	Ryan Carr
	Penrith Panthers	Panthers Stadium	Peter Wallace
	South Sydney Rabbitohs	Metricon High Performance Centre, Stadium Australia	N/A
	St. George Illawarra Dragons	WIN Stadium, Netstrata Jubilee Stadium	N/A
	Western Suburbs Magpies	Lidcombe Oval	Ben Gardiner

=== Ladder ===
The table below reflects the competition ladder at the completion of Round 15. This was the last completed round played, and occurred on the weekend of 19–20 June 2021. During July and early August 2021, when there was a hope that the competition could be resumed in late August and September, scheduled matches were cancelled, with the result recorded as a nil-all draw. A Round 2 match between Blacktown Workers Sea Eagles and South Sydney Rabbitohs was postponed due to wet weather. As the rescheduled date was 28 July 2021 this match was not played.

Pos	Team	Pld	W	D	L	PF	PA	PD	Pts
1	Penrith Panthers	13	12	0	1	417	192	+225	28
2	Parramatta Eels	13	9	0	4	367	270	+97	22
3	Western Suburbs Magpies	14	9	1	4	422	294	+128	21
4	North Sydney Bears	13	7	1	5	282	299	−17	19
5	Newcastle Knights	13	6	1	6	290	313	−23	17
6	Mount Pritchard Mounties	13	6	0	7	286	282	+4	16
7	Newtown Jets	12	4	1	7	250	320	−70	15
8	Canberra Raiders	13	5	0	8	302	308	−6	14
9	St. George Illawarra Dragons	13	4	0	9	258	358	−100	12
10	Blacktown Workers Sea Eagles	12	4	0	8	254	368	−114	12
11	South Sydney Rabbitohs	11	2	0	9	226	350	−124	10

Updated to match(es) played on 21 June 2021. Source: NSWRL website
Rules for classification: 1) points; 2) point difference; 3) points scored

==== Ladder progression ====
- Numbers highlighted in green indicate that the team finished the round inside the top 8.
- Numbers highlighted in blue indicates the team finished first on the ladder in that round.
- Numbers highlighted in red indicates the team finished last place on the ladder in that round.
- Underlined numbers indicate that the team had a bye during that round.

Pos	Team	1	2	3	4	5	6	7	8	9	10	11	12	13	14	15	16	17	18	19	20	21	22	23	24
1	Penrith Panthers	2	4	6	8	10	12																		
2	Western Suburbs Magpies	0	0	2	4	6	8																		
3	North Sydney Bears	0	2	4	6	7	7																		
4	Canberra Raiders	2		2	4	4	6																		
5	Mount Pritchard Mounties	2	2	4	4	4	6																		
6	Parramatta Eels	2		4	4	6	6																		
7	Newcastle Knights	0		0	2	4	6																		
8	Blacktown Workers Sea Eagles	2		2	2	2	4																		
9	South Sydney Rabbitohs	0		0	2	4	4																		
10	St. George Illawarra Dragons	0	2	4	4	4	4																		
11	Newtown Jets	2		2	2	3	3																		

=== Season results ===
==== Round 1 ====
Home	Score	Away	Match Information
Home	Score	Away	Date and Time	Venue	Referee
Newcastle Knights	8 – 26	Mount Pritchard Mounties	Friday, 12 March, 3:45pm	McDonald Jones Stadium	Darian Furner
Penrith Panthers	36 – 26	South Sydney Rabbitohs	Saturday, 13 March, 5:15pm	Panthers Stadium	Cameron Paddy
Blacktown Workers Sea Eagles	48 – 20	North Sydney Bears	Sunday, 14 March, 1:10pm	HE Laybutt Field	Keiren Irons
Canberra Raiders	32 – 18	Western Suburbs Magpies	Sunday, 14 March, 1:50pm	GIO Stadium	Martin Jones
St. George Illawarra Dragons	10 – 16	Newtown Jets	Sunday, 14 March, 3:55pm	Netstrata Jubilee Stadium	Henry Perenara
Parramatta Eels		BYE

==== Round 2 ====
Home	Score	Away	Match Information
Home	Score	Away	Date and Time	Venue	Referee
Mount Pritchard Mounties	8 – 28	Penrith Panthers	Saturday, 20 March, 12:40pm	Bankwest Stadium	Martin Jones
Western Suburbs Magpies	16 – 24	North Sydney Bears	Sunday, 21 March, 6:20pm	Campbelltown Sports Stadium	Cameron Paddy
Parramatta Eels	26 – 24	Canberra Raiders	Saturday, 15 May, 2:30pm	Ringrose Park	TBD
Newcastle Knights	22 – 8	Newtown Jets	Saturday, 15 May 1:30pm	Maitland Sports Ground	TBD
Blacktown Workers Sea Eagles	V	South Sydney Rabbitohs	Postponed	TBA	TBD
St. George Illawarra Dragons		BYE

==== Round 3 ====
Home	Score	Away	Match Information
Home	Score	Away	Date and Time	Venue	Referee
South Sydney Rabbitohs	12 – 30	North Sydney Bears	Friday, 26 March, 5:40pm	Stadium Australia	Cameron Paddy
Canberra Raiders	10 – 34	Mount Pritchard Mounties	Saturday, 27 March, 12:40pm	GIO Stadium	Darian Furner
Parramatta Eels	22 – 20	Newtown Jets	Saturday, 27 March, 5:10pm	Bankwest Stadium	Martin Jones
Newcastle Knights	6 – 50	Western Suburbs Magpies	Sunday, 28 March, 1:45pm	McDonald Jones Stadium	Kasey Badger
Blacktown Workers Sea Eagles	18 – 44	St. George Illawarra Dragons	Sunday, 28 March, 3:00pm	HE Laybutt Field	Keiren Irons
Penrith Panthers		BYE

==== Round 4 ====
Home	Score	Away	Match Information
Home	Score	Away	Date and Time	Venue	Referee
Blacktown Workers Sea Eagles	6 – 32	Penrith Panthers	Saturday, 3 April, 2:00pm	Lottoland	Henry Perenara
Mount Pritchard Mounties	22 – 24	South Sydney Rabbitohs	Saturday, 3 April, 3:00pm	Aubrey Keech Reserve	Martin Jones
Canberra Raiders	60 – 20	Newtown Jets	Saturday, 3 April, 4:00pm	Raiders Belconnen	Cameron Paddy
Newcastle Knights	40 – 6	St. George Illawarra Dragons	Sunday, 4 April, 1:45pm	McDonald Jones Stadium	Chris Butler
Western Suburbs Magpies	34 – 28	Parramatta Eels	Monday, 5 April, 1:30pm	Stadium Australia	Kieren Irons
North Sydney Bears		BYE

==== Round 5 ====
Home	Score	Away	Match Information
Home	Score	Away	Date and Time	Venue	Referee
Penrith Panthers	24 – 10	Canberra Raiders	Friday, 9 April, 5:30pm	BlueBet Stadium	Henry Perenara
Parramatta Eels	40 – 8	St. George Illawarra Dragons	Sunday, 11 April, 1:10pm	Bankwest Stadium	Martin Jones
Western Suburbs Magpies	34 – 14	Mount Pritchard Mounties	Sunday, 11 April, 1:40pm	Leichhardt Oval	Todd Smith
North Sydney Bears	20 – 20	Newtown Jets	Sunday, 11 April, 2:00pm	North Sydney Oval	Kieren Irons
Blacktown Workers Sea Eagles	16 – 30	Newcastle Knights	Sunday, 11 April, 2:00pm	Lottoland	Cameron Paddy
South Sydney Rabbitohs		BYE

==== Round 6 ====
Home	Score	Away	Match Information
Home	Score	Away	Date and Time	Venue	Referee
South Sydney Rabbitohs	18 – 42	Western Suburbs Magpies	Saturday, 17 April, 12:40pm	Stadium Australia	Cameron Paddy
Penrith Panthers	42 – 6	St. George Illawarra Dragons	Saturday, 17 April, 1:00pm	BlueBet Stadium	Jake Sutherland
Newtown Jets	22 – 42	Newcastle Knights	Saturday, 17 April, 3:00pm	Henson Park	Kieren Irons
Canberra Raiders	30 – 22	Parramatta Eels	Saturday, 17 April, 5:20pm	GIO Stadium	Martin Jones
Mount Pritchard Mounties	32 – 12	North Sydney Bears	Sunday, 18 April, 2:00pm	Aubrey Keech Reserve	Todd Smith
Blacktown Workers Sea Eagles		BYE

==== Round 7 ====
Home	Score	Away	Match Information
Home	Score	Away	Date and Time	Venue	Referee
Penrith Panthers	19 – 6	Newcastle Knights	Thursday, 22 April, 5:30pm	BlueBet Stadium	Kieren Irons
Newtown Jets	30 24	Mount Pritchard Mounties	Saturday, 24 April, 3:00pm	Henson Park	Martin Jones
Parramatta Eels	38 – 20	South Sydney Rabbitohs	Saturday, 24 April, 5:30pm	Ringrose Park	Jake Sutherland
Western Suburbs Magpies	46 – 6	Blacktown Workers Sea Eagles	Sunday, 25 April, 11:20am	Bankwest Stadium	Kasey Badger
North Sydney Bears	26 – 12	St. George Illawarra Dragons	Sunday, 25 April, 2:00pm	North Sydney Oval	Cameron Paddy
Canberra Raiders		BYE

==== Round 8 ====
Home	Score	Away	Match Information
Home	Score	Away	Date and Time	Venue	Referee
Penrith Panthers	52 – 6	Blacktown Workers Sea Eagles	Saturday, 1 May, 12:40pm	Carrington Park	TBD
Mount Pritchard Mounties	34 – 26	Parramatta Eels	Saturday, 1 May, 3:00pm	Stadium Australia	TBD
Canberra Raiders	22 – 26	South Sydney Rabbitohs	Saturday, 1 May, 4:00pm	Raiders Belconnen	TBD
Newcastle Knights	18 – 34	North Sydney Bears	Saturday, 1 May, 5:15pm	McDonald Jones Stadium	TBD
St. George Illawarra Dragons	28 – 30	Western Suburbs Magpies	Sunday, 2 May, 1:40pm	WIN Stadium	TBD
Newtown Jets		BYE

==== Round 9 ====
Home	Score	Away	Match Information
Home	Score	Away	Date and Time	Venue	Referee
Penrith Panthers	46 – 18	Newtown Jets	Saturday, 8 May, 1:30pm	Panthers Stadium	TBD
Parramatta Eels	39 – 0	North Sydney Bears	Friday, 7 May, 5:25pm	Bankwest Stadium	TBD
Canberra Raiders	20 – 22	Newcastle Knights	Saturday, 8 May, 12:40pm	McDonalds Park	TBD
South Sydney Rabbitohs	18 – 30	Blacktown Workers Sea Eagles	Saturday, 8 May, 2:00pm	Metricon High Performance Centre	TBD
St. George Illawarra Dragons	36 – 22	Mount Pritchard Mounties	Sunday, 9 May, 1:40pm	Netstrata Jubilee Stadium	TBD
Western Suburbs Magpies		BYE

==== Round 10 ====
Home	Score	Away	Match Information
Home	Score	Away	Date and Time	Venue	Referee
North Sydney Bears	16 – 36	Western Suburbs Magpies	Thursday, 13 May, 7:30pm	North Sydney Oval	TBD
Penrith Panthers	BYE	Newcastle Knights
St. George Illawarra Dragons	BYE	Mount Pritchard Mounties
Newtown Jets	BYE	Blacktown Workers Sea Eagles
South Sydney Rabbitohs	BYE	Parramatta Eels
Canberra Raiders	BYE

==== Round 11 ====
Home	Score	Away	Match Information
Home	Score	Away	Date and Time	Venue	Referee
Western Suburbs Magpies	36 – 22	Canberra Raiders	Saturday, 22 May, 3:00pm	Lidcombe Oval	TBD
Newtown Jets	44 – 20	St. George Illawarra Dragons	Saturday, 22 May, 3:00pm	Henson Park	TBD
South Sydney Rabbitohs	22 – 24	Penrith Panthers	Sunday, 23 May, 11:30am	Apex Oval	TBD
Parramatta Eels	24 – 34	Blacktown Workers Sea Eagles	Sunday, 23 May, 1:35pm	Bankwest Stadium	TBD
North Sydney Bears	20 – 10	Mount Pritchard Mounties	Sunday, 23 May, 2:00pm	North Sydney Oval	TBD
Newcastle Knights		BYE

==== Round 12 ====
Home	Score	Away	Match Information
Home	Score	Away	Date and Time	Venue	Referee
Penrith Panthers	16 – 38	Mount Pritchard Mounties	Saturday, 29 May, 12:40pm	Panthers Stadium	TBD
Western Suburbs Magpies	26 – 18	St. George Illawarra Dragons	Saturday, 29 May, 3:00pm	Lidcombe Oval	TBD
South Sydney Rabbitohs	12 – 22	Parramatta Eels	Saturday, 29 May, 3:00pm	Stadium Australia	TBD
Newcastle Knights	16 – 38	Blacktown Workers Sea Eagles	Sunday, 30 May, 1:10pm	McDonald Jones Stadium	TBD
North Sydney Bears	34 – 12	Canberra Raiders	Sunday, 30 May, 2:00pm	North Sydney Oval	TBD
Newtown Jets		BYE

==== Round 13 ====
Home	Score	Away	Match Information
Home	Score	Away	Date and Time	Venue	Referee
South Sydney Rabbitohs	18 – 40	St. George Illawarra Dragons	Saturday, 5 June, 2:00pm	Metricon High Performance Centre	TBD
Western Suburbs Magpies	14 – 40	Penrith Panthers	Saturday, 5 June, 3:00pm	Lidcombe Oval	TBD
Newtown Jets	10 – 20	Canberra Raiders	Saturday, 5 June, 3:00pm	Henson Park	TBD
Newcastle Knights	22 – 30	Parramatta Eels	Sunday, 6 June, 1:10pm	McDonald Jones Stadium	TBD
North Sydney Bears	30 – 18	Blacktown Workers Sea Eagles	Sunday, 6 June, 2:00pm	North Sydney Oval	TBD
Mount Pritchard Mounties		BYE

==== Round 14 ====
Home	Score	Away	Match Information
Home	Score	Away	Date and Time	Venue	Referee
South Sydney Rabbitohs	30 – 44	Newcastle Knights	Saturday, 12 June, 12:40pm	Stadium Australia	TBD
Newtown Jets	16 – 32	Penrith Panthers	Saturday, 12 June, 3:00pm	Henson Park	TBD
Canberra Raiders	30 – 22	Blacktown Workers Sea Eagles	Saturday, 12 June, 5:20pm	GIO Stadium	TBD
Parramatta Eels	28 – 26	Western Suburbs Magpies	Sunday, 13 June, 1:35pm	Bankwest Stadium	TBD
Mount Pritchard Mounties	26 – 16	St. George Illawarra Dragons	Monday, 14 June, 1:40pm	Stadium Australia	TBD
North Sydney Bears		BYE

==== Round 15 ====
Home	Score	Away	Match Information
Home	Score	Away	Date and Time	Venue	Referee
Penrith Panthers	26 – 16	North Sydney Bears	Saturday, 19 June, 1:00pm	Panthers Stadium	TBD
Western Suburbs Magpies	14 – 14	Newcastle Knights	Saturday, 19 June, 3:00pm	Lidcombe Oval	TBD
Newtown Jets	26 – 12	Blacktown Workers Sea Eagles	Saturday, 19 June, 3:00pm	Henson Park	TBD
St. George Illawarra Dragons	14 – 10	Canberra Raiders	Saturday, 19 June, 3:05pm	WIN Stadium	TBD
Parramatta Eels	22 – 6	Mount Pritchard Mounties	Sunday, 20 June, 11:30am	Bankwest Stadium	TBD
South Sydney Rabbitohs		BYE
