= Ashley Klein =

Australian rugby league referee (born 1979)

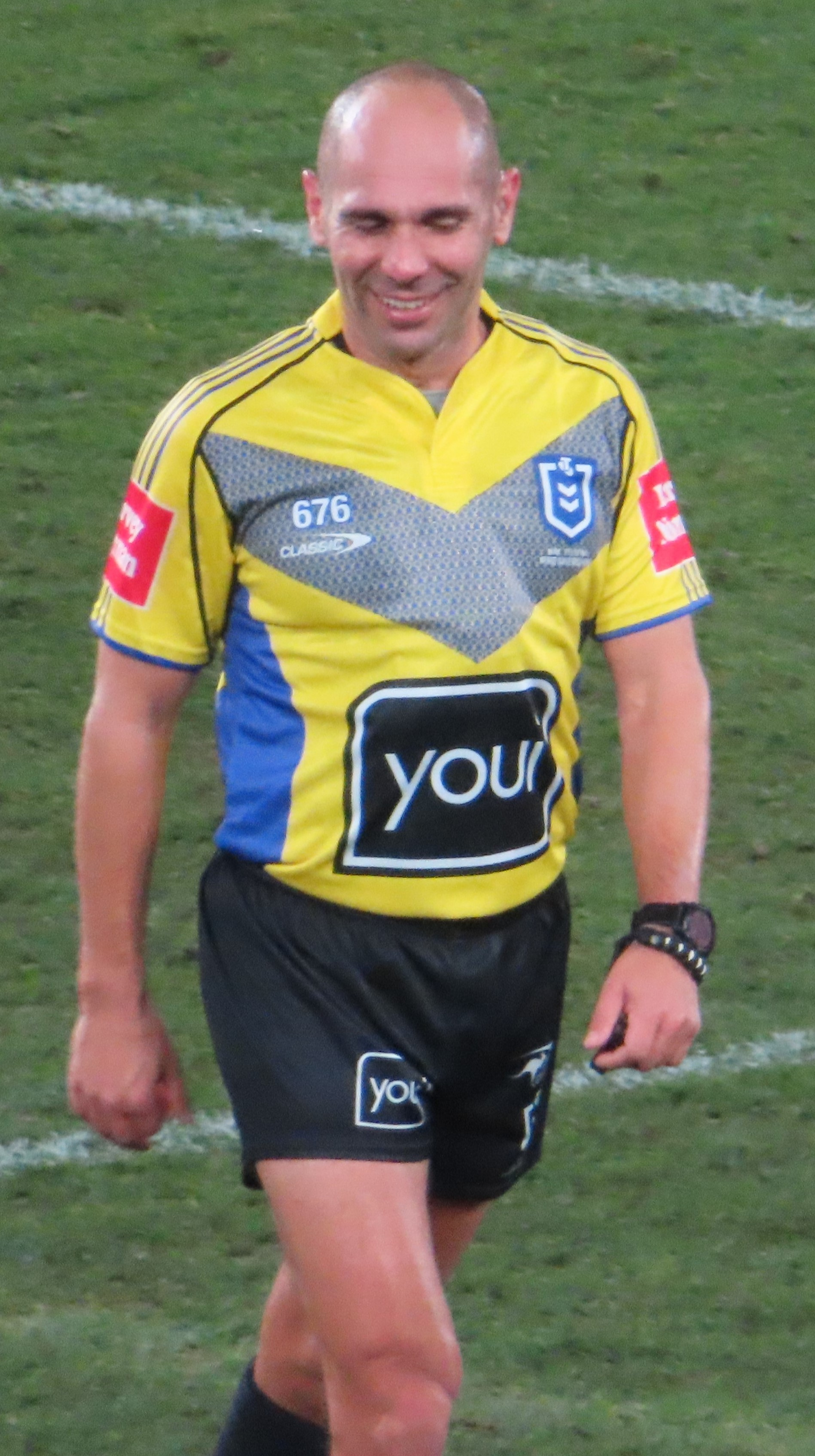
- Klein in 2023

Personal information
- Born: 6 September 1979 (age 47) Bathurst, New South Wales, Australia

Refereeing information
Years	Competition	Apps
2002	Northern Ford Premiership
2003–2008	Super League	150
2009–	National Rugby League	416
- Father: John Klein

Ashley Klein is an Australian rugby league referee. He first refereed in England, beginning his career in the Rugby League Conference, but returned to Australia and currently referees in the National Rugby League.

== Career ==
Klein refereed the NRL grand finals in 2018, 2022, and 2024.

His first professional game was Workington Town v Featherstone Rovers on 8 September 2002. His first Super League game was Huddersfield Giants v Wakefield Trinity Wildcats on 15 June 2003. In 2006 Klein was named by the Rugby League International Federation as referee of the year. Klein was in charge of the 2008 Rugby League World Cup Final in Australia. He quit the Super League in 2009 to return to Australia, to rejoin his wife and children. In September 2024, he became the second person to reach 400 matches refereed in the NRL when he presided over the elimination final between the Cronulla-Sutherland Sharks and the North Queensland Cowboys.

Klein is a former Parramatta Eels junior referee.

On 17 February 2012, Klein was the referee for the 2012 World Club Challenge match between Leeds Rhinos and Manly Sea Eagles at the Headingley Carnegie Stadium in Leeds which saw the English side win 26–12. On 19 April 2013 he was the referee for the 2013 Anzac Test.

As of 9 July 2025, Klein has refereed 20 State of Origin games. He refereed the final of the 2021 Rugby League World Cup in England.

== Controversies ==
=== Gambling ===
In a series of reports published by The Sydney Morning Herald in June 2026 (ahead of the second game of the State of Origin series), it was revealed that Klein had a serious gambling problem involving horse and greyhound racing, ultimately losing more than A$400,000 dollars before placing himself on the national self-exclusion register, BetStop, in 2023. The NRL first became aware of the issue in 2019 and conducted an investigation, concluding that Klein had not breached any rules because he had never bet on rugby league. As a result, he was allowed to continue officiating at the highest level, including State of Origin matches and NRL Grand Finals.

Klein's gambling reportedly escalated despite an agreement for the league (NRL) to monitor his betting activity. Integrity experts and some club officials argued that a referee with a serious gambling problem could pose a reputational and integrity risk, even without any evidence of wrongdoing. Further scrutiny followed when it emerged Klein had professional development with Racing NSW's integrity department. Throughout the controversy, both Klein and the NRL maintained that he never breached any rules, never bet on rugby league, and that his refereeing was never affected by his gambling addiction.

Following the disclosure of Klein's gambling issues, a number of commentators, former players, and coaches publicly weighed in on the matter. The Sydney Morning Herald's Roy Masters argued that Klein should be dismissed, while noting that his "masthead is not suggesting Klein or any employee of the NRL has acted improperly, and it must be assumed they would be above being swept up, even subconsciously, in such a crusade." Queensland coach Billy Slater defended Klein during a pre-Game II press conference, stating: "To be honest, I personally think it's unfair to have something personal like that be aired publicly," before adding, "I feel for Ashley... it hasn't been discussed within our camp and that's my personal position with it. I think it's quite unfair on him." New South Wales coach Laurie Daley echoed Slater's sentiments, saying: "I agree with Bill. It's challenging when things like that get brought up and I hope Ashley has got the right support and people around him to help navigate the period. We’ve got no issues with Ashley being part of the game." Speaking on SEN Radio, former Brisbane Broncos and Kangaroos player Corey Parker expressed an opposing view, arguing that Klein should be stood down from officiating until the matter had been fully examined by the NRL's integrity unit.

== Personal Life ==
=== Family ===
Klein is the son of former Penrith player John Klein.

His son Ethan is also a graded referee with the NSWRL. He was awarded NSWRL Junior Referee of the Year in 2022 and currently referees in the NSW Cup. Ethan debuted in the NRL as a Touch Judge in Round 27 2026.
