= Ben Cummins =

Australian rugby league referee

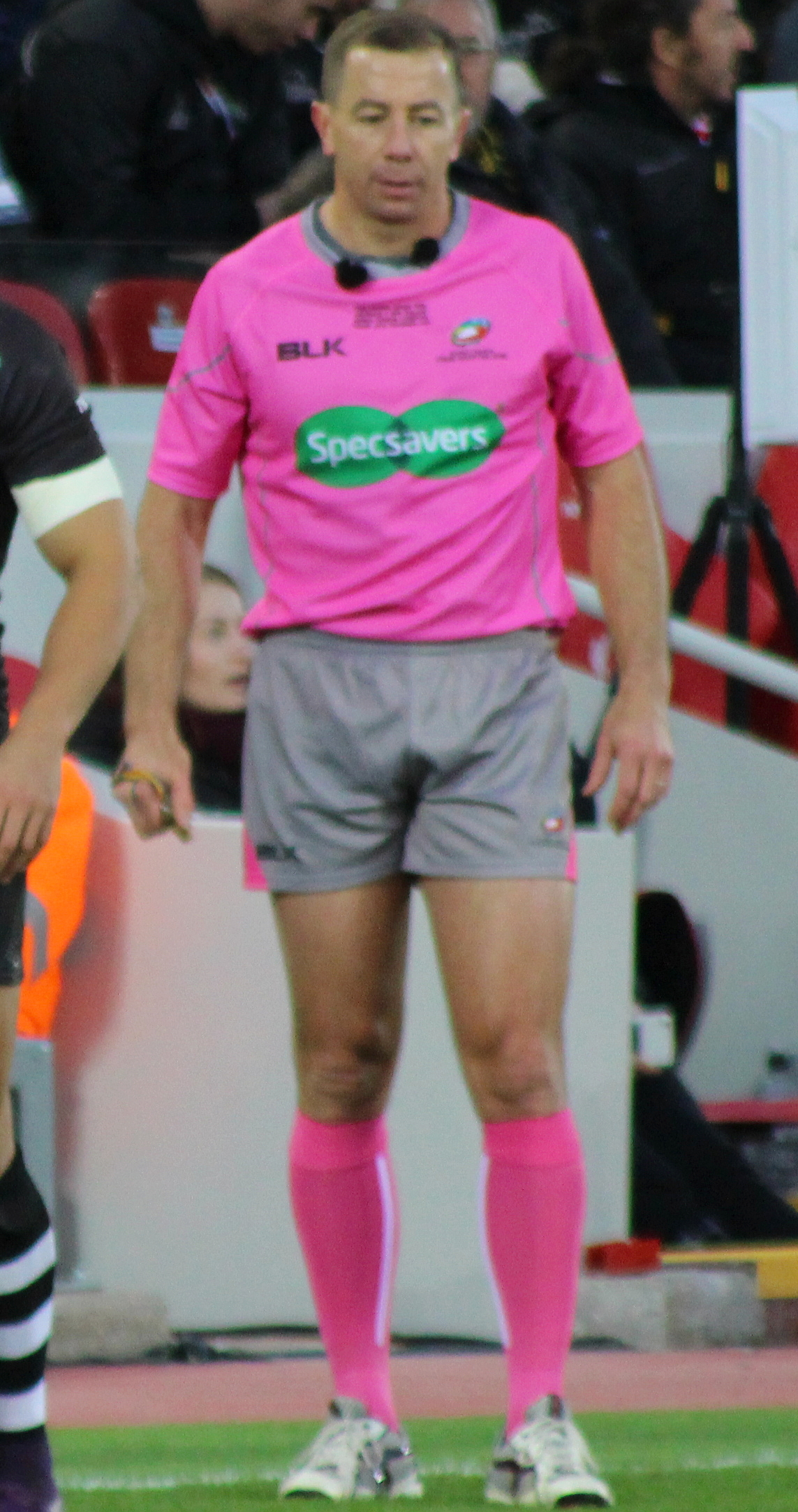

Refereeing information
Years	Competition	Apps
2006–23	NRL	443
2010–17	Tests	13
2011	City vs Country	1
2011–17	State of Origin	14

Ben Cummins is an Australian former rugby league referee, who last officiated in the National Rugby League.

== Background ==
Cummins was born in Cairns, Queensland. He moved to Canberra, Australian Capital Territory, when he was four years of age. He now lives in Sydney with his wife (Jane), three daughters (Isani, Bethany and Caitlin) and son (Patrick). He played junior rugby league in Canberra and studied primary school teaching at the Australian Catholic University.

== Refereeing career ==
He made his National Rugby League debut in 2006 in a Cowboys-Panthers match in North Queensland.

In 2011 he controlled the City vs Country Origin match. Since then he has refereed matches in the 2011, 2012, 2013, 2014, 2015, 2016 and 2017 State of Origin series. He also controlled the 2014 World Club Challenge.

His international appointments include the 2010 Rugby League Four Nations and 2014 Rugby League Four Nations and the 2013 and 2017 Rugby League World Cups.

In August 2017, he became the sixth referee to control 300 NRL matches.

During the 2019 NRL Grand Final, with the scores at 8–all and with less than ten minutes remaining in the match, his controversial change of mind after ruling six again in favour of the Canberra Raiders proved a major turning point as the Sydney Roosters scored off the subsequent set of six to win the match 14–8.

On 29 July 2021, Cummins officiated his 400th NRL Match, becoming the first referee to do so, after earlier in the season surpassing Bill Harrigan's 18-year record of 393 games.

Cummins announced that following the last round of the 2023 NRL season that he would retire. The experienced whistleblower controlled his 443rd and last game on 2 September 2023 between the St George Illawarra Dragons and the Newcastle Knights.
