= Salter Oval =

Cricket ground in Bundaberg, Australia

Coordinates: 24°52′31.08″S 152°19′49.65″E

Ground information
- Location: Bundaberg, Australia
- Establishment: circa 1945
- Capacity: 8,500 (600 seated)

Team information
Queensland	(1982–1995)
- As of 21 October 2011; Source: Ground profile

Salter Oval (known prior to 1945 as the West End Recreation Reserve) is a cricket ground in Bundaberg, Queensland, Australia. The first recorded match on the ground came in 1948 when Queensland Country Women played England Women. It held its only first-class match in 1981 when Queensland played the touring New Zealanders. Two List A matches have been played there. The first came in 1991 when Queensland played the touring West Indians, while the second saw Queensland play the touring Zimbabweans in 1995.

In February 2016, Brisbane Broncos played North Queensland Cowboys in a National Rugby League trial fixture, with the attendance figure reported at 8,122.

Salter Oval hosted Bundaberg's first National Rugby League match for premiership points on August 7, 2022 when the Canterbury-Bankstown Bulldogs took on the North Queensland Cowboys.

== NRL Games ==
Date	Result	Attendance
7 August 2022	Bulldogs 14–28 Cowboys	8,521
30 July 2023	Bulldogs 23–22 Dolphins	5,130
17 August 2024	Bulldogs 30–10 Dolphins	6,146
