= List of players sent off in National Rugby League matches =

This is a list of players sent off in NRL and NRL Women's matches since the reunification of rugby league in Australia after the Super League war in 1998. Referees have the option to send players from the field for a variety of reasons, but it has mostly been utilised for serious foul play in recent seasons.

In 2022 while playing for the South Sydney Rabbitohs, Taane Milne became the first player to be sent off in any NRL finals match. He was the first player sent off in an Australian first grade rugby league finals match since 1994. No player has ever been sent off in any NRL Grand Final.

In the first round of the 2023 NRL Women's season, Ashleigh Werner became the first player to be sent off in any NRL Women's match.

The tables below also has the result of any charges laid by the NRL match review and the resulting penalty (if any) laid by the NRL Judiciary.

== List of players sent off (NRL) ==
Key to list
Finals match

Year	Round	Player	Team	Opponent	Referee(s)	Offence	NRL Judiciary	Ref.
1998	Round 1	John Hopoate	Manly Sea Eagles	Brisbane Broncos	Bill Harrigan	Dissent/Contrary Conduct	2 matches	
1998	Round 1	Geoff Toovey	Manly Sea Eagles	Brisbane Broncos	Bill Harrigan	Dissent/Contrary conduct	No matches	
1998	Round 3	Andrew Dunemann	North Queensland Cowboys	Parramatta Eels	Steve Chiddy	High tackle	1 match	
1998	Round 4	Graham Appo	Canberra Raiders	North Queensland Cowboys	Steve Clark	High tackle	3 matches	
1998	Round 5	Simon Gillies	Bulldogs	Parramatta Eels	Paul Simpkins	High tackle	1 match	
1998	Round 6	Gorden Tallis	Brisbane Broncos	Manly Sea Eagles	Steve Clark	High tackle	Not guilty	
1998	Round 7	Lance Thompson	St George Dragons	Western Suburbs Magpies	Sean Hampstead	High tackle	Not guilty	
1998	Round 8	Shaun Timmins	Illawarra Steelers	Penrith Panthers	Matt Hewitt	Careless tackle	1 match	
1998	Round 8	Lance Thompson	St George Dragons	South Sydney Rabbitohs	Brian Grant	High tackle	1 match	
1998	Round 9	Peter Jorgensen	Penrith Panthers	Gold Coast Chargers	Eddie Ward	Careless tackle	1 match	
1998	Round 10	Jerry Seuseu	Auckland Warriors	Bulldogs	Steve Clark	Careless tackle	1 match	
1998	Round 11	Shaun Timmins	Illawarra Steelers	Melbourne Storm	Paul Simpkins	Careless tackle	4 matches	
1998	Round 12	Darren Fritz	Western Suburbs Magpies	Adelaide Rams	Steve Chiddy	Striking	1 match	
1998	Round 14	Gordon Falcon	Penrith Panthers	Brisbane Broncos	Sean Hampstead	Careless tackle	3 matches	
1998	Round 18	Wendell Sailor	Brisbane Broncos	Illawarra Steelers	Paul McBlane	Fighting	Not guilty	
1998	Round 21	Scott Thorburn	Gold Coast Chargers	North Sydney Bears	Moghseen Jadwat	Dissent	No matches	
1998	Round 22	Matt Adamson	Penrith Panthers	Parramatta Eels	Tim Mander	High tackle	Not guilty	
1999	Round 1	Ben Walker	Brisbane Broncos	Canberra Raiders	Tim Mander	High tackle	3 matches	
1999	Round 1	Ali Lauiti'iti	Auckland Warriors	Sydney City Roosters	Matt Hewitt	High tackle	No matches	
1999	Round 1	Brad Fittler	Sydney City Roosters	Auckland Warriors	Matt Hewitt	Fighting	No matches	
1999	Round 14	Damien Smith	North Queensland Cowboys	Cronulla Sharks	Bill Harrigan	High tackle	2 matches	
1999	Round 16	Mark Geyer	Penrith Panthers	Balmain Tigers	Matt Hewitt	High tackle	Not guilty	
1999	Round 19	David Penna	Parramatta Eels	North Queensland Cowboys	Sean Hampstead	High tackle	1 match	
1999	Round 22	Paul Green	North Queensland Cowboys	Cronulla Sharks	Moghseen Jadwat	High tackle	No matches	
1999	Round 22	Matthew Ridge	Auckland Warriors	Melbourne Storm	Matt Hewitt	Tripping	1 match	
2000	Round 2	Brendan Hurst	Sydney Roosters	Cronulla Sharks	Sean Hampstead	High tackle	2 matches	
2000	Round 2	Scott Pethybridge	Auckland Warriors	Wests Tigers	Mark Oaten	High tackle	No matches	
2000	Round 7	Shane Rigon	Sydney Roosters	Wests Tigers	Steve Clark	High tackle	No matches	
2000	Round 11	Ali Lauiti'iti	Auckland Warriors	North Queensland Cowboys	Kelvin Jeffes	High tackle	2 matches	
2000	Round 15	Ali Lauiti'iti	Auckland Warriors	Northern Eagles	Moghseen Jadwat	High tackle	Withdrawn	
2000	Round 19	John Hopoate	Wests Tigers	St. George Illawarra Dragons	Tim Mander	Fighting	1 match	
2000	Round 19	Terry Lamey	St. George Illawarra Dragons	Wests Tigers	Tim Mander	Fighting	2 matches	
2000	Round 24	Rodney Howe	Melbourne Storm	Northern Eagles	Sean Hampstead	High tackle	Withdrawn	
2001	Round 9	Wayne Bartrim	St. George Illawarra Dragons	Parramatta Eels	Sean Hampstead	Attempted kicking	1 match	
2001	Round 21	PJ Marsh	Parramatta Eels	North Queensland Cowboys	Mark Oaten	Striking	2 matches	
2002	Round 3	Mark Riddell	St. George Illawarra Dragons	Canterbury Bulldogs	Bill Harrigan	Striking	4 matches	
2002	Round 6	Tim Maddison	North Queensland Cowboys	Sydney Roosters	Tim Mander	Striking	10 matches	
2002	Round 9	Mark Riddell	St. George Illawarra Dragons	Canberra Raiders	Paul Simpkins	High tackle	4 matches	
2002	Round 14	Shane Walker	Melbourne Storm	St. George Illawarra Dragons	Sean Hampstead	High tackle	3 matches	
2002	Round 23	Corey Pearson	Wests Tigers	Cronulla Sharks	Shayne Hayne	Fighting	No charge	
2003	Round 11	Paul Gallen	Cronulla Sharks	Newcastle Knights	Paul Simpkins	High tackle	6 matches	
2003	Round 22	Simon Woolford	Canberra Raiders	Manly Sea Eagles	Paul Simpkins	High tackle	2 matches	
2003	Round 24	Dale Newton	Cronulla Sharks	Parramatta Eels	Shayne Hayne	High tackle	2 matches	
2003	Round 24	David Peachey	Cronulla Sharks	Parramatta Eels	Shayne Hayne	Dissent/Abuse	No matches	
2003	Round 26	Adam Peek	Parramatta Eels	Penrith Panthers	Sean Hampstead	Late tackle	No charge	
2003	Round 26	Albert Torrens	Manly Sea Eagles	Melbourne Storm	Paul Simpkins	High tackle	3 matches	
2004	Round 4	Greg Bird	Cronulla Sharks	South Sydney Rabbitohs	Tony Archer	Kneeing	10 matches	
2004	Round 13	Justin Hodges	Sydney Roosters	Canterbury Bulldogs	Paul Simpkins	High tackle	2 matches	
2004	Round 19	Danny Williams	Melbourne Storm	Wests Tigers	Gavin Badger	Striking	18 matches	
2004	Round 24	Clint Newton	Newcastle Knights	St. George Illawarra Dragons	Tim Mander	Striking	12 matches	
2005	Round 2	John Hopoate	Manly Sea Eagles	Cronulla Sharks	Paul Simpkins	Striking	17 matches	
2005	Round 6	Adrian Morley	Sydney Roosters	Canterbury Bulldogs	Paul Simpkins	High tackle	No charge	
2006	Round 17	Matt Utai	Canterbury Bulldogs	Wests Tigers	Paul Simpkins	High tackle	5 matches	
2006	Round 20	Adrian Morley	Sydney Roosters	Canterbury Bulldogs	Jared Maxwell	Kneeing	7 matches	
2006	Round 21	Fuifui Moimoi	Parramatta Eels	Manly Sea Eagles	Steve Clark	High tackle	7 matches	
2006	Round 23	Luke O'Donnell	North Queensland Cowboys	New Zealand Warriors	Gavin Badger	High tackle	1 match	
2007	Round 1	Sonny Bill Williams	Canterbury Bulldogs	Newcastle Knights	Tony Archer	High tackle	2 matches	
2007	Round 11	Jaiman Lowe	South Sydney Rabbitohs	Gold Coast Titans	Tony De Las Heras	Striking	4 matches	
2007	Round 12	Michael Crockett	New Zealand Warriors	Canterbury Bulldogs	Sean Hampstead	High tackle	2 matches	
2007	Round 13	Adam Peek	St. George Illawarra Dragons	Cronulla Sharks	Tony Archer	Striking	2 matches	
2007	Round 19	Wade McKinnon	New Zealand Warriors	Wests Tigers	Paul Simpkins	Kneeing	No charge	
2008	Round 2	Ben Ross	Cronulla Sharks	Melbourne Storm	Tony Archer	Striking	7 matches	
2008	Round 2	Brett White	Melbourne Storm	Cronulla Sharks	Tony Archer	Fighting	4 matches	
2008	Round 4	Michael Weyman	Canberra Raiders	Gold Coast Titans	Ben Cummins	Striking	5 matches	
2008	Round 12	Adam Cuthbertson	Manly Sea Eagles	Canberra Raiders	Sean Hampstead	High tackle	1 match	
2008	Round 12	Luke O'Donnell	North Queensland Cowboys	Penrith Panthers	Alan Shortall	Striking	3 matches	
2008	Round 19	Jason Ryles	St. George Illawarra Dragons	Melbourne Storm	Gavin Badger	Kicking	No charge	
2009	Round 15	Dane Nielsen	Melbourne Storm	Wests Tigers	Steve Lyons; Ashley Klein	High tackle	1 match	
2009	Round 25	Luke Douglas	Cronulla Sharks	Manly Sea Eagles	Jason Robinson; Phil Haines	High tackle	No matches	
2010	Round 25	Petero Civoniceva	Penrith Panthers	Canterbury Bulldogs	Steve Lyons; Tony De Las Heras	High tackle	2 matches	
2011	Round 1	Paul Aiton	Cronulla Sharks	Canberra Raiders	Ashley Klein; Adam Devcich	Headbutting	1 match	
2011	Round 25	Adam Blair	Melbourne Storm	Manly Sea Eagles	Shayne Hayne; Gavin Badger	Fighting	3 matches	
2011	Round 25	Glenn Stewart	Manly Sea Eagles	Melbourne Storm	Shayne Hayne; Gavin Badger	Fighting	3 matches	
2012	Round 9	Matt Prior	St. George Illawarra Dragons	North Queensland Cowboys	Tony Archer; Gavin Badger	Striking	5 matches	
2012	Round 20	Travis Burns	Penrith Panthers	Sydney Roosters	Ashley Klein; Gavin Reynolds	High tackle	9 matches	
2012	Round 24	Anthony Minichiello	Sydney Roosters	Canberra Raiders	Shayne Hayne; Alan Shortall	High tackle	Not guilty	
2013	Round 9	Jared Warea-Hargreaves	Sydney Roosters	Manly Sea Eagles	Matt Cecchin; Henry Perenara	High tackle	5 matches	
2013	Round 24	Kade Snowden	Newcastle Knights	North Queensland Cowboys	Shayne Hayne; Alan Shortall	Shoulder charge (high contact)	7 matches	
2015	Round 22	David Shillington	Canberra Raiders	Wests Tigers	Jared Maxwell; Henry Perenara	Headbutting	No matches	
2018	Round 11	Curtis Scott	Melbourne Storm	Manly Sea Eagles	Henry Perenara; Ziggy Przeklasa-Adamski	Striking/Fighting	2 matches	
2019	Round 17	Nick Cotric	Canberra Raiders	St. George Illawarra Dragons	Ashley Klein; Todd Smith	Dangerous throw	3 matches	
2020	Round 8	Addin Fonua-Blake	Manly Sea Eagles	Newcastle Knights	Grant Atkins	Dissent/Abuse	2 matches	
2020	Round 14	Kevin Proctor	Gold Coast Titans	Cronulla Sharks	Henry Perenara	Biting	4 matches	
2020	Round 17	Chad Townsend	Cronulla Sharks	Newcastle Knights	Ben Cummins	Shoulder charge	3 matches	
2021	Round 6	Jack Hetherington	Canterbury Bulldogs	North Queensland Cowboys	Ashley Klein	High tackle	5 matches	
2021	Round 10	Josh Papalii	Canberra Raiders	Canterbury Bulldogs	Chris Butler	High tackle	3 matches	
2021	Round 10	Tyrell Fuimaono	St. George Illawarra Dragons	Melbourne Storm	Peter Gough	High tackle	5 matches	
2021	Round 10	Herman Ese'ese	Gold Coast Titans	Penrith Panthers	Adam Gee	High tackle	3 matches	
2021	Round 14	Kobe Hetherington	Brisbane Broncos	Canberra Raiders	Chris Sutton	High tackle	Fined $1,150	
2021	Round 22	Corey Harawira-Naera	Canberra Raiders	Melbourne Storm	Gerard Sutton	High tackle	3 matches	
2021	Round 22	Ryan Matterson	Parramatta Eels	Manly Sea Eagles	Grant Atkins	Shoulder charge (high contact)	3 matches	
2022	Round 3	Mitchell Barnett	Newcastle Knights	Penrith Panthers	Peter Gough	Dangerous contact	6 matches	
2022	Round 8	Karl Lawton	Manly Sea Eagles	South Sydney Rabbitohs	Grant Atkins	Dangerous throw	4 matches	
2022	Round 9	William Kennedy	Cronulla Sharks	New Zealand Warriors	Todd Smith	High tackle	2 matches	
2022	Round 14	Brent Naden	Wests Tigers	Manly Sea Eagles	Peter Gough	Dangerous throw	4 matches	
2022	Round 16	Jarrod Wallace	Gold Coast Titans	Newcastle Knights	Chris Butler	Dangerous throw	2 matches	
2022	Round 17	David Klemmer	Newcastle Knights	South Sydney Rabbitohs	Todd Smith	Dangerous contact	Fined $1,000	
2022	Round 20	Nathan Cleary	Penrith Panthers	Parramatta Eels	Todd Smith	Dangerous throw	5 matches	
2022	Round 20	Tom Burgess	South Sydney Rabbitohs	Cronulla-Sutherland Sharks	Gerard Sutton	High tackle	1 match	
2022	Round 23	James Tamou	Wests Tigers	Sydney Roosters	Ben Cummins	Dissent	1 match	
2022	Round 23	Francis Molo	St. George Illawarra Dragons	Gold Coast Titans	Liam Kennedy	High tackle	4 matches	
2022	Round 24	Brian Kelly	Gold Coast Titans	Newcastle Knights	Ben Cummins	Dangerous throw	4 matches	
2022	Preliminary final	Taane Milne	South Sydney Rabbitohs	Penrith Panthers	Ashley Klein	High tackle	6 matches	
2023	Round 2	Jacob Saifiti	Newcastle Knights	Wests Tigers	Peter Gough	High tackle	5 matches	
2023	Round 23	Nathan Brown	Sydney Roosters	Manly Warringah Sea Eagles	Ashley Klein	High tackle	1 match	
2023	Round 23	Moeaki Fotuaika	Gold Coast Titans	New Zealand Warriors	Ben Cummins	High tackle	1 match	
2023	Round 27	Sebastian Kris	Canberra Raiders	Cronulla-Sutherland Sharks	Grant Atkins	Dangerous Throw	5 matches	
2024	Round 5	Dom Young	Sydney Roosters	Canterbury-Bankstown Bulldogs	Grant Atkins	High tackle	2 matches	
2024	Round 16	Fetalaiga Pauga	Sydney Roosters	Canterbury-Bankstown Bulldogs	Grant Atkins	High tackle	4 matches	
2024	Round 22	Justin Olam	Wests Tigers	North Queensland Cowboys	Chris Butler	High tackle	4 matches	
2026	Round 7	Jaydn Su'A	St. George Illawarra Dragons	South Sydney Rabbitohs	Ziggy Przeklasa-Adamski	Shoulder charge	3 matches	
2026	Round 26	Jacob Saifiti	Newcastle Knights	New Zealand Warriors	Adam Gee	High tackle	4 matches	
2026	Preliminary final	Phoenix Crossland	Newcastle Knights	Penrith Panthers	Gerard Sutton	Dangerous contact	4 matches	

== Statistics ==
Season	Number	Total games (including finals)
1998	17	253
1999	8	213
2000	8	191
2001	2	191
2002	5	189
2003	6	189
2004	4	189
2005	2	189
2006	4	189
2007	5	201
2008	6	201
2009	2	201
2010	1	201
2011	3	201
2012	3	201
2013	2	201
2014	0	201
2015	1	201
2016	0	201
2017	0	201
2018	1	201
2019	1	201
2020	3	167
2021	7	201
2022	12	201
2023	4	213
2024	3	213
2025	0	213
2026	3	213

== List of players sent off (NRL Women's) ==
Year	Round	Player	Team	Opponent	Referee(s)	Offence	NRL Judiciary	Ref.
2023	Round 1	Ashleigh Werner	Brisbane Broncos	Sydney Roosters	Wyatt Raymond	Biting	2 matches	
2023	Round 3	Kennedy Cherrington	Parramatta Eels	Newcastle Knights	Belinda Sharpe	Dangerous throw	4 matches	
2025	Round 2	Reegan Hicks	Brisbane Broncos	Gold Coast Titans	Clayton Wills	Dangerous throw	2 matches	
2025	Round 7	Maketino Gray	New Zealand Warriors	Canberra Raiders	Damian Brady	Dangerous throw	2 matches	
2025	Round 7	Tysha Ikenasio	New Zealand Warriors	Canberra Raiders	Damian Brady	Dangerous contact	3 matches	

== List of players sent off (State of Origin) ==
Year	Game	Player	Team	Referee(s)	Offence	NRL Judiciary	Reference(s)
1996	Game 2	Craig Greenhill	Queensland	David Manson	High tackle	4 matches	
2000	Game 1	Gorden Tallis	Queensland	Bill Harrigan	Dissent	No matches	
2009	Game 3	Trent Waterhouse	New South Wales	Tony Archer Shayne Hayne	Contrary conduct	Not guilty	
2023	Game 2	Reece Walsh	Queensland	Ashley Klein	Headbutting	Fined 23% of match fee	
2023	Game 2	Jarome Luai	New South Wales	Ashley Klein	Headbutting	Fined 23% of match fee	
2024	Game 1	Joseph-Aukuso Sua'ali'i	New South Wales	Ashley Klein	High tackle	4 matches	
2026	Game 1	Kalyn Ponga	Queensland	Ashley Klein	Shoulder charge	Fined 23% of match fee	
