= 2011 NRL season results =

The 2011 NRL season consisted of 26 weekly regular season rounds, which began on 11 March and ended on 4 September, followed by four weeks of the finals series culminating in the grand final on 2 October.

== Pre-season ==
Saturday 5 February

Home	Score	Away	Match Information
Home	Score	Away	Time (Local)	Venue	Information	Attendance
New Zealand Warriors	22-22	Newcastle Knights	6:00 pm	Wingham Park, NZ	Mine Disaster Charity Match	6,500
South Sydney Rabbitohs	10–4	Newtown Jets	6:00 pm	Redfern Oval, NSW	Return to Redfern	5,000
Ipswich Jets	12–22	Sydney Roosters	8:30 pm	North Ipswich Reserve, QLD		4,500

Friday 11 February

Home	Score	Away	Match Information
Home	Score	Away	Time (Local)	Venue	Information	Attendance
Ipswich Jets	0–34	Melbourne Storm	8:00 pm	Langlands Park, QLD	First Half
Eastern Suburbs Tigers	10–0	Melbourne Storm	8:45 pm	Langlands Park, QLD	Second Half
Manly Sea Eagles	18–0	Cronulla Sharks	7:00 pm	Brookvale Oval, NSW
North Queensland Cowboys	10–22	Wests Tigers	8:30 pm	Jack Manski Oval, QLD		4,000

Saturday 12 February

Home	Score	Away	Match Information
Home	Score	Away	Time (Local)	Venue	Information	Attendance
New Zealand Warriors	24–4	Parramatta Eels	3:00 pm	Rotorua International Stadium, NZ		8,600
Sydney Roosters	22–24	Canterbury-Bankstown Bulldogs	5:00 pm	Leichhardt Oval, NSW
Indigenous All Stars	12–28	NRL All Stars	7:30 pm	Skilled Park, QLD	2011 All Stars Match	25,800
Brisbane Broncos	42–18	Gold Coast Titans	8:30 pm	Kougari Oval, QLD		3,500

Sunday 13 February

Home	Score	Away	Match Information
Home	Score	Away	Time (Local)	Venue	Information	Attendance
South Sydney Rabbitohs	10–32	St George Illawarra Dragons	7:00 pm	ANZ Stadium, NSW	Charity Shield	19,267
Newcastle Knights	72–0	Fiji	6:00 pm	EnergyAustralia Stadium, NSW

Friday 18 February

Home	Score	Away	Match Information
Home	Score	Away	Time (Local)	Venue	Information	Attendance
St George Illawarra Dragons	28–12	Canterbury-Bankstown Bulldogs	7:00 pm	WIN Stadium, NSW	Mercury Challenge

Saturday 19 February

Home	Score	Away	Match Information
Home	Score	Away	Time (Local)	Venue	Information	Attendance
New Zealand Warriors	30–0	Burleigh Bears	3:00 pm	Toll Stadium, NZ		8,500
Wests Tigers	10–30	Parramatta Eels		Campbelltown Stadium, NSW		12,761
South Sydney Rabbitohs	4–42	Gold Coast Titans	7:00 pm	BCU International Stadium, NSW
Melbourne Storm	24–4	Canberra Raiders	7:00 pm	Bega Recreation Oval, NSW		6,169
Penrith Panthers	28–22	Newcastle Knights	7:30 pm	Port Macquarie Regional Stadium, NSW
Brisbane Broncos	26–4	North Queensland Cowboys	9:00 pm	ANZAC Oval, NT

Saturday 26 February

- 6:00 pm Warriors v Manly-Warringah Sea Eagles @ North Harbour Stadium, Auckland NZ
- 7:30 pm Canterbury Bulldogs v Canberra Raiders @ Scully Park, Tamworth NSW
- 7:30 pm Newcastle Knights v Cronulla-Sutherland Sharks @ Olympic Park, Muswellbrook NSW
- 7:30 pm Sydney Roosters v Wests Tigers @ Sydney Football Stadium, NSW (Foundation Cup)
- 8:00 pm North Queensland Cowboys v Gold Coast Titans @ Barlow Park, Cairns QLD (Stockland Trophy)
- 8:00 pm Penrith Panthers 0 v Parramatta Eels 30 @ Penrith Stadium, Penrith NSW (Battle for the West Cup)
- 8:30 pm Brisbane Broncos v Melbourne Storm @ Dolphin Oval, Redcliffe QLD

== Regular season ==
Details are correct with the Official NRL site.

=== Round 1 ===
Home	Score	Away	Match Information
Home	Score	Away	Date and Time (Local)	Venue	Referees	Attendance
Brisbane Broncos	14–16	North Queensland Cowboys	11 March 2011, 7:35 pm	Suncorp Stadium	Shayne Hayne; Gerard Sutton	45,119
Sydney Roosters	40–29	South Sydney Rabbitohs	11 March 2011, 7:35 pm	Sydney Football Stadium	Tony Archer; Alan Shortall	28,703
Gold Coast Titans	16–25	St George Illawarra Dragons	12 March 2011, 6:30 pm	Skilled Park	Jared Maxwell; Phil Haines	21,709
Melbourne Storm	18–6	Manly-Warringah Sea Eagles	12 March 2011, 7:30 pm	AAMI Park	Matt Cecchin; Gavin Reynolds	14,651
New Zealand Warriors	18–24	Parramatta Eels	12 March 2011, 7:30 pm	Eden Park	Steve Lyons; Chris James	38,412
Canberra Raiders	40–12	Cronulla-Sutherland Sharks	13 March 2011, 2:00 pm	Canberra Stadium	Ashley Klein; Adam Devcich	13,450
Penrith Panthers	8–42	Newcastle Knights	13 March 2011, 3:00 pm	Centrebet Stadium	Ben Cummins; Tony De Las Heras	12,431
Canterbury-Bankstown Bulldogs	24–14	Wests Tigers	14 March 2011, 7:00 pm	ANZ Stadium	Gavin Badger; Brett Suttor	26,737

Source: NRL 2011 Round 1 – RL Project

- The attendances for this round totalled beyond 200,000 for the first time to be the highest attended round in NRL history, with 201,247 fans attending.
- Luke Burt of the Parramatta Eels reached the milestone of scoring over 1,500 career points, becoming the 14th player to do so.
- The New Zealand Warriors hosted their first ever home match outside of Mt Smart Stadium, playing against the Parramatta Eels at Eden Park.
- The North Queensland Cowboys defeated the Brisbane Broncos for the first time since 2007.

=== Round 2 ===
Home	Score	Away	Match Information
Home	Score	Away	Date and Time (Local)	Venue	Referees	Attendance
Parramatta Eels	6–20	Penrith Panthers	18 March 2011, 7:35 pm	Parramatta Stadium	Shayne Hayne; Gerard Sutton	15,974
Canberra Raiders	4–20	Brisbane Broncos	18 March 2011, 8:35 pm	Canberra Stadium	Matt Cecchin; Steve Lyons	16,146
Melbourne Storm	40–12	Gold Coast Titans	19 March 2011, 5:30 pm	AAMI Park	Adam Devcich; Ashley Klein	12,391
Wests Tigers	20–12	New Zealand Warriors	19 March 2011, 7:30 pm	Leichhardt Oval	Tony Archer; Alan Shortall	13,161
North Queensland Cowboys	22–34	Newcastle Knights	19 March 2011, 8:30 pm	Dairy Farmers Stadium	Phil Haines; Jared Maxwell	14,061
South Sydney Rabbitohs	19–28	Canterbury-Bankstown Bulldogs	20 March 2011, 2:00 pm	ANZ Stadium	Gavin Badger; Brett Suttor	18,271
Sydney Roosters	16–27	Manly-Warringah Sea Eagles	20 March 2011, 3:00 pm	Sydney Football Stadium	Ben Cummins; Tony De Las Heras	11,016
Cronulla-Sutherland Sharks	16–10	St George Illawarra Dragons	21 March 2011, 7:00 pm	Toyota Stadium	Chris James; Jason Robinson	12,183

Source: NRL 2011 Round 2 – RL Project

- Billy Slater of the Melbourne Storm broke his club's all-time try scoring record, surpassing Matt Geyer with 114 tries.
- Preston Campbell of the Gold Coast Titans played his 250th NRL game.
- Adam Blair of the Melbourne Storm played his 100th NRL game.

=== Round 3 ===
Home	Score	Away	Match Information
Home	Score	Away	Date and Time (Local)	Venue	Referees	Attendance
Gold Coast Titans	8–14	Brisbane Broncos	25 March 2011, 7:35 pm	Skilled Park	Gavin Badger; Brett Suttor	20,226
Parramatta Eels	18–32	South Sydney Rabbitohs	25 March 2011, 7:35 pm	ANZ Stadium	Matt Cecchin; Steve Lyons	22,153
Penrith Panthers	12–44	Cronulla-Sutherland Sharks	26 March 2011, 5:30 pm	Centrebet Stadium	Phil Haines; Jared Maxwell	9,275
Wests Tigers	34–24	Canberra Raiders	26 March 2011, 7:30 pm	Campbelltown Stadium	Chris James; Jason Robinson	14,091
Canterbury-Bankstown Bulldogs	24–20	Sydney Roosters	27 March 2011, 2:00 pm	ANZ Stadium	Adam Devcich; Ashley Klein	23,723
New Zealand Warriors	12–25	St George Illawarra Dragons	27 March 2011, 2:00 pm	Mt Smart Stadium	Ben Cummins; Tony De Las Heras	11,651
Manly-Warringah Sea Eagles	26–12	Newcastle Knights	27 March 2011, 3:00 pm	Brookvale Oval	Shayne Hayne; Gerard Sutton	13,087
North Queensland Cowboys	34–6	Melbourne Storm	28 March 2011, 6:15 pm	Dairy Farmers Stadium	Tony Archer; Alan Shortall	9,554

Source: NRL 2011 Round 3 – RL Project

- The Sydney Roosters played their 2000th premiership match, becoming the first and only club to achieve such a feat.
- Todd Payten of the Wests Tigers played his 250th NRL game.
- Jeremy Smith of the Cronulla Sharks played his 100th NRL game.
- The North Queensland Cowboys defeated the Melbourne Storm for the first time since 2006.

=== Round 4 ===
Home	Score	Away	Match Information
Home	Score	Away	Date and Time (Local)	Venue	Referees	Crowd
Brisbane Broncos	18–10	Penrith Panthers	1 April 2011, 7:35 pm	Suncorp Stadium	Jason Robinson; Chris James	25,263
South Sydney Rabbitohs	32–30	Manly-Warringah Sea Eagles	1 April 2011, 7:35 pm	Bluetongue Stadium	Ashley Klein; Adam Devcich	18,108
Canberra Raiders	22–23	Gold Coast Titans	2 April 2011, 5:30 pm	Canberra Stadium	Matt Cecchin; Steve Lyons	12,165
Parramatta Eels	22–20	North Queensland Cowboys	2 April 2011, 7:30 pm	Parramatta Stadium	Phil Haines; Jared Maxwell	11,226
Cronulla-Sutherland Sharks	18–26	New Zealand Warriors	3 April 2011, 2:00 pm	Owen Delany Park	Gavin Badger; Brett Suttor	14,645
Newcastle Knights	18–20	St George Illawarra Dragons	3 April 2011, 2:00 pm	Ausgrid Stadium	Ben Cummins; Tony De Las Heras	20,986
Sydney Roosters	24–6	Wests Tigers	3 April 2011, 3:00 pm	Sydney Football Stadium	Tony Archer; Alan Shortall	20,479
Melbourne Storm	30–16	Canterbury-Bankstown Bulldogs	4 April 2011, 7:00 pm	AAMI Park	Shayne Hayne; Gerard Sutton	11,592

Source: NRL 2011 Round 4 – RL Project

- Luke Burt of the Parramatta Eels broke his club's all-time try scoring record, surpassing Brett Kenny with 111 tries.
- Matt Bowen achieved the milestone of most games played for the North Queensland Cowboys, surpassing Paul Bowman by playing his 204th game.
- The Gold Coast Titans became the first of any Gold Coast club to win at Canberra Stadium, after nine previous losses. Canberra's loss was their first in golden point games.

=== Round 5 – Heritage Round ===
Home	Score	Away	Match Information
Home	Score	Away	Date and Time (Local)	Venue	Referees	Crowd
North Queensland Cowboys	22–12	Gold Coast Titans	8 April 2011, 7:35 pm	Dairy Farmers Stadium	Ben Cummins; Tony De Las Heras	13,651
Wests Tigers	30–6	South Sydney Rabbitohs	8 April 2011, 7:35 pm	Sydney Football Stadium	Adam Devcich; Ashley Klein	22,677
Cronulla-Sutherland Sharks	13–19	Manly-Warringah Sea Eagles	9 April 2011, 7:30 pm	Toyota Stadium	Matt Cecchin; Steve Lyons	15,133
New Zealand Warriors	24–12	Sydney Roosters	9 April 2011, 7:30 pm	Mt Smart Stadium	Chris James; Jason Robinson	13,312
Penrith Panthers	36–10	Canberra Raiders	9 April 2011, 7:30 pm	Centrebet Stadium	Gavin Badger; Brett Suttor	10,229
Melbourne Storm	38–0	Parramatta Eels	10 April 2011, 2:00 pm	AAMI Park	Tony Archer; Alan Shortall	11,805
St George Illawarra Dragons	25–6	Canterbury-Bankstown Bulldogs	10 April 2011, 3:00 pm	Sydney Cricket Ground	Shayne Hayne; Gerard Sutton	31,122
Brisbane Broncos	17–6	Newcastle Knights	11 April 2011, 7:00 pm	Suncorp Stadium	Phil Haines; Jared Maxwell	24,522

- For the first time since last year's salary cap scandal, the Melbourne Storm occupied top spot on the NRL ladder.

Source: NRL 2011 Round 5 – RL Project

=== Round 6 ===
Home	Score	Away	Match Information
Home	Score	Away	Date and Time (Local)	Venue	Referees	Crowd
Gold Coast Titans	20–14	Wests Tigers	15 April 2011, 7:35 pm	Skilled Park	Shayne Hayne; Adam Devcich	17,221
Parramatta Eels	14–34	Canterbury-Bankstown Bulldogs	15 April 2011, 7:35 pm	ANZ Stadium	Ashley Klein; Gerard Sutton	30,687
Manly-Warringah Sea Eagles	20–10	New Zealand Warriors	16 April 2011, 5:30 pm	Brookvale Oval	Tony Archer; Brett Suttor	8,680
North Queensland Cowboys	26–18	Canberra Raiders	16 April 2011, 7:30 pm	Dairy Farmers Stadium	Gavin Badger; Steve Lyons	10,741
Sydney Roosters	6–24	Brisbane Broncos	16 April 2011, 7:30 pm	Bluetongue Stadium	Matt Cecchin; Gavin Reynolds	8,616
Newcastle Knights	24–20	Cronulla-Sutherland Sharks	17 April 2011, 2:00 pm	Ausgrid Stadium	Jason Robinson; Phil Haines	12,796
Penrith Panthers	10–25	Melbourne Storm	17 April 2011, 3:00 pm	Centrebet Stadium	Ben Cummins; Chris James	11,137
South Sydney Rabbitohs	0–16	St George Illawarra Dragons	18 April 2011, 7:00 pm	ANZ Stadium	Jared Maxwell; Alan Shortall	22,771

Source: NRL 2011 Round 6 – RL Project

=== Round 7 ===
Home	Score	Away	Match Information
Home	Score	Away	Date and Time (Local)	Venue	Referees	Crowd
Manly-Warringah Sea Eagles	22–16	Penrith Panthers	22 April 2011, 7:35 pm	Brookvale Oval	Jason Robinson; Phil Haines	14,623
Wests Tigers	18–31	Brisbane Broncos	22 April 2011, 7:35 pm	Sydney Football Stadium	Tony Archer; Brett Suttor	19,494
Cronulla-Sutherland Sharks	12–30	North Queensland Cowboys	23 April 2011, 5:30 pm	Toyota Stadium	Gavin Badger; Steve Lyons	7,340
Canterbury-Bankstown Bulldogs	36–24	South Sydney Rabbitohs	23 April 2011, 7:30 pm	ANZ Stadium	Ben Cummins; Tony De Las Heras	22,352
Canberra Raiders	12–22	Newcastle Knights	24 April 2011, 2:00 pm	Canberra Stadium	Matt Cecchin; Gavin Reynolds	11,879
Parramatta Eels	22–18	Gold Coast Titans	24 April 2011, 3:00 pm	Parramatta Stadium	Ashley Klein; Gerard Sutton	10,052
Sydney Roosters	10–24	St. George Illawarra Dragons	25 April 2011, 4:00 pm	Sydney Football Stadium	Jared Maxwell; Alan Shortall	34,976
Melbourne Storm	14–18	New Zealand Warriors	25 April 2011, 7:00 pm	AAMI Park	Shayne Hayne; Gavin Morris	22,694

Source: NRL 2011 Round 7 – RL Project

=== Round 8 ===
Home	Score	Away	Match Information
Home	Score	Away	Date and Time (Local)	Venue	Referees	Crowd
Brisbane Broncos	20–12	Canterbury-Bankstown Bulldogs	29 April 2011, 7:35 pm	Suncorp Stadium	Gavin Badger; Adam Devcich	30,538
South Sydney Rabbitohs	31–12	Cronulla-Sutherland Sharks	29 April 2011, 7:35 pm	ANZ Stadium	Tony Archer; Brett Suttor	9,363
Gold Coast Titans	24–13	Sydney Roosters	30 April 2011, 5:30 pm	Skilled Park	Matt Cecchin; Gavin Reynolds	15,177
Melbourne Storm	42–12	Newcastle Knights	30 April 2011, 7:30 pm	AAMI Park	Jason Robinson; Chris James	9,460
North Queensland Cowboys	22–20	Manly-Warringah Sea Eagles	30 April 2011, 7:30 pm	Dairy Farmers Stadium	Shayne Hayne; Gavin Morris	14,884
New Zealand Warriors	26–18	Penrith Panthers	1 May 2011, 2:00 pm	Mt Smart Stadium	Jared Maxwell; Alan Shortall	11,412
Canberra Raiders	12–49	Wests Tigers	1 May 2011, 2:00 pm	Canberra Stadium	Ashley Klein; Gerard Sutton	13,425
St. George Illawarra Dragons	30–0	Parramatta Eels	1 May 2011, 3:00 pm	WIN Jubilee Oval	Ben Cummins; Tony De Las Heras	19,319

Source: NRL 2011 Round 8 – RL Project

=== Round 9 ===
No club games were played on 6 May due to the Test Match and City vs Country Origin representative matches being played on that day.

Home	Score	Away	Match Information
Home	Score	Away	Date and Time (Local)	Venue	Referees	Crowd
Brisbane Broncos	22–29	Melbourne Storm	7 May 2011, 7:30 pm	Suncorp Stadium	Shayne Hayne; Tony De Las Heras	34,175
Gold Coast Titans	14–34	New Zealand Warriors	8 May 2011, 2:00 pm	Skilled Park	Jared Maxwell; Jason Robinson	17,285
St George Illawarra Dragons	22–8	North Queensland Cowboys	8 May 2011, 3:00 pm	WIN Jubilee Oval	Gavin Badger; Matt Cecchin	13,056
Manly-Warringah Sea Eagles	20–0	Canberra Raiders	9 May 2011, 7:00 pm	Brookvale Oval	Tony Archer; Steve Lyons	6,148

BYE: 8 teams – Canterbury-Bankstown Bulldogs, Parramatta Eels, Penrith Panthers, Cronulla-Sutherland Sharks, South Sydney Rabbitohs, Sydney Roosters, Newcastle Knights, Wests Tigers.
Source: NRL 2011 Round 9 – RL Project

- Brett Stewart of the Manly-Warringah Sea Eagles surpassed the milestone of 100 career tries.
- Johnathan Thurston of the North Queensland Cowboys became his club's highest point scorer, surpassing Josh Hannay with 883 points.

=== Round 10 ===
Home	Score	Away	Match Information
Home	Score	Away	Date and Time (Local)	Venue	Referees	Crowd
Canterbury Bankstown Bulldogs	10–15	St George Illawarra Dragons	13 May 2011, 7:35 pm	ANZ Stadium	Ben Cummins; Tony De Las Heras	34,322
Penrith Panthers	33–10	Brisbane Broncos	13 May 2011, 7:35 pm	Centrebet Stadium	Matt Cecchin; Phil Haines	11,336
Melbourne Storm	12–20	Canberra Raiders	14 May 2011, 5:30 pm	AAMI Park	Gerard Sutton; Chris James	9,628
North Queensland Cowboys	40–26	Parramatta Eels	14 May 2011, 7:30 pm	Dairy Farmers Stadium	Ashley Klein; Luke Phillips	13,610
South Sydney Rabbitohs	29–18	Wests Tigers	14 May 2011, 7:30 pm	ANZ Stadium	Steve Lyons; Jared Maxwell	18,245
Newcastle Knights	16–25	New Zealand Warriors	15 May 2011, 2:00 pm	Ausgrid Stadium	Tony Archer; Brett Suttor	18,158
Cronulla-Sutherland Sharks	18–4	Sydney Roosters	15 May 2011, 3:00 pm	Toyota Stadium	Shayne Hayne; Gavin Morris	14,459
Gold Coast Titans	12–16	Manly-Warringah Sea Eagles	16 May 2011, 7:00 pm	Skilled Park	Gavin Badger; Adam Devcich	12,360

Source: NRL 2011 Round 10 – RL Project

- The Canberra Raiders defeated the Melbourne Storm at any Melbourne venue (AAMI Park and Olympic Park Stadium) for the first time since 2000.
- The Penrith Panthers defeated the Brisbane Broncos at their home ground for the first time since 2005.
- Nathan Merritt scored his 100th try for the South Sydney Rabbitohs.

=== Round 11 ===
Home	Score	Away	Match Information
Home	Score	Away	Date and Time (Local)	Venue	Referees	Crowd
Canberra Raiders	20–12	Canterbury Bulldogs	20 May 2011, 7:45 pm	Canberra Stadium	Shayne Hayne; Chris James	12,865
Wests Tigers	20–18	Penrith Panthers	21 May 2011, 7:30 pm	Campbelltown Stadium	Ben Cummins; Brett Suttor	16,172
Sydney Roosters	12–10	Newcastle Knights	22 May 2011, 3:00 pm	Sydney Football Stadium	Matt Cecchin; Adam Devcich	10,146
New Zealand Warriors	12–6	South Sydney Rabbitohs	22 May 2011, 4:00 pm	Mt Smart Stadium	Steve Lyons; Phil Haines	16,873
Parramatta Eels	40–6	Cronulla Sharks	23 May 2011, 7:00 pm	Parramatta Stadium	Jason Robinson; Alan Shortall	10,628

BYE: 6 teams – St George Illawarra Dragons, Brisbane Broncos, Melbourne Storm, North Queensland Cowboys, Manly Sea Eagles, Gold Coast Titans.
Source: NRL 2011 Round 11 – RL Project

- Players selected for Game One of the 2011 State of Origin series were unavailable to play NRL matches for this round.
- Parramatta defeated Cronulla on its home ground for the first time since 2003, when the Eels thrashed the Sharks 74–4.

=== Round 12 ===
Home	Score	Away	Match Information
Home	Score	Away	Date and Time (Local)	Venue	Referees	Crowd
Manly-Warringah Sea Eagles	34–10	Brisbane Broncos	27 May 2011, 7:00 pm	Suncorp Stadium	Ben Cummins; Gerard Sutton	32,283
Canterbury Bankstown Bulldogs	28–6	Gold Coast Titans	27 May 2011, 8:45 pm	Suncorp Stadium	Ashley Klein; Tony De Las Heras	32,283
Newcastle Knights	8–6	Parramatta Eels	28 May 2011, 5:30 pm	Ausgrid Stadium	Gavin Badger; Brett Suttor	18,723
North Queensland Cowboys	20–6	Sydney Roosters	28 May 2011, 7:30 pm	Dairy Farmers Stadium	Jason Robinson; Adam Devcich	13,335
Melbourne Storm	14–8	Cronulla-Sutherland Sharks	29 May 2011, 2:00 pm	AAMI Park	Phil Haines; Steve Lyons	9,733
St George Illawarra Dragons	24–18	Wests Tigers	29 May 2011, 3:00 pm	WIN Jubilee Oval	Matt Cecchin; Alan Shortall	19,892
Penrith Panthers	22–10	South Sydney Rabbitohs	30 May 2011, 7:00 pm	Centrebet Stadium	Shayne Hayne; Luke Phillips	5,703

BYE: 2 teams – New Zealand Warriors, Canberra Raiders
Source: NRL 2011 Round 12 – RL Project

- The St George Illawarra Dragons have recorded their longest winning streak, winning 9 games in succession.
- Cameron Smith of the Melbourne Storm played his 200th NRL game.
- Anthony Watmough of the Manly-Warringah Sea Eagles played his 200th NRL game.

=== Round 13 ===
Home	Score	Away	Match Information
Home	Score	Away	Date and Time (Local)	Venue	Referees	Crowd
Cronulla-Sutherland Sharks	16–34	Brisbane Broncos	3 June 2011, 7:35 pm	Toyota Stadium	Matt Cecchin; Tony De Las Heras	14,436
Parramatta Eels	14–14	St George Illawarra Dragons	3 June 2011, 7:35 pm	Parramatta Stadium	Gerard Sutton; Ashley Klein	16,066
Gold Coast Titans	10–23	Penrith Panthers	4 June 2011, 5:30 pm	Skilled Park	Tony Archer; Luke Phillips	12,262
Canterbury-Bankstown Bulldogs	4–38	Manly-Warringah Sea Eagles	4 June 2011, 7:30 pm	ANZ Stadium	Shayne Hayne; Adam Devcich	19,830
Sydney Roosters	13–6	New Zealand Warriors	4 June 2011, 7:30 pm	Sydney Football Stadium	Jason Robinson; Alan Shortall	10,116
Canberra Raiders	24–40	North Queensland Cowboys	5 June 2011, 2:00 pm	Canberra Stadium	Gavin Badger; Phil Haines	11,128
South Sydney Rabbitohs	6–16	Melbourne Storm	5 June 2011, 3:00 pm	ANZ Stadium	Ben Cummins; Chris James	11,528
Wests Tigers	17–16	Newcastle Knights	6 June 2011, 7:00 pm	Leichhardt Oval	Jarred Maxwell; Steve Lyons	18,021

Source: NRL 2011 Round 13 – RL Project

- Michael Jennings of the Penrith Panthers played his 100th NRL game.
- Michael Hodgson of the Canterbury Bankstown Bulldogs played his 200th NRL game.

=== Round 14 ===
Home	Score	Away	Match Information
Home	Score	Away	Date and Time (Local)	Venue	Referees	Crowd
St George Illawarra Dragons	14–28	Gold Coast Titans	10 June 2011, 7:45 pm	WIN Jubilee Oval	Tony Archer; Alan Shortall	10,139
Manly-Warringah Sea Eagles	24–4	North Queensland Cowboys	11 June 2011, 7:30 pm	Brookvale Oval	Jarred Maxwell; Gerard Sutton	8,452
Brisbane Broncos	25–24	Canberra Raiders	12 June 2011, 2:00 pm	Suncorp Stadium	Jason Robinson; Brett Suttor	21,378
New Zealand Warriors	22–26	Wests Tigers	12 June 2011, 4:00 pm	Mt Smart Stadium	Ashley Klein; Adam Devcich	15,889
Melbourne Storm	21–4	Sydney Roosters	13 June 2011, 7:00 pm	AAMI Park	Gavin Badger; Tony De Las Heras	9,843

BYE: 6 teams – Cronulla Sharks, Canterbury Bulldogs, Newcastle Knights, Parramatta Eels, South Sydney Rabbitohs, Penrith Panthers.

Source: NRL 2011 Round 14 – RL Project

- Players selected for Game Two of the 2011 State of Origin series were unavailable to play NRL matches for this round.

=== Round 15 ===
Home	Score	Away	Match Information
Home	Score	Away	Date and Time (Local)	Venue	Referees	Crowd
Brisbane Broncos	21–14	St George Illawarra Dragons	17 June 2011, 7:35 pm	Suncorp Stadium	Jarred Maxwell; Gerard Sutton	34,185
South Sydney Rabbitohs	31–8	Gold Coast Titans	17 June 2011, 7:35 pm	ANZ Stadium	Jason Robinson; Brett Suttor	8,021
Newcastle Knights	16–12	Penrith Panthers	18 June 2011, 5:30 pm	Ausgrid Stadium	Gavin Badger; Tony De Las Heras	16,652
North Queensland Cowboys	30–10	New Zealand Warriors	18 June 2011, 7:30 pm	Dairy Farmers Stadium	Matt Cecchin; Michael Wise	16,081
Canterbury Bulldogs	10–26	Cronulla Sharks	19 June 2011, 2:00 pm	ANZ Stadium	Steve Lyons; Alan Shortall	14,879
Wests Tigers	4–12	Melbourne Storm	19 June 2011, 3:00 pm	Leichhardt Oval	Ashley Klein; Adam Devcich	20,486
Manly Sea Eagles	22–18	Parramatta Eels	20 June 2011, 7:00 pm	Brookvale Oval	Tony Archer; Phil Haines	13,959

BYE: 2 teams – Sydney Roosters, Canberra Raiders

Source: NRL 2011 Round 15 – RL Project

- Scott Prince of the Gold Coast Titans played his 250th NRL game.
- The Cronulla-Sutherland Sharks defeated the Canterbury-Bankstown Bulldogs for the first time since 2007.

=== Round 16 – Women in League Round ===
Home	Score	Away	Match Information
Home	Score	Away	Date and Time (Local)	Venue	Referees	Crowd
South Sydney Rabbitohs	16–12	Brisbane Broncos	24 June 2011, 7:00 pm	NIB Stadium	Jason Robinson; Steve Lyons	15,371
Wests Tigers	6–16	Canterbury Bankstown Bulldogs	24 June 2011, 7:35 pm	Campbelltown Stadium	Matt Cecchin; Alan Shortall	19,252
Gold Coast Titans	12–36	Cronulla-Sutherland Sharks	25 June 2011, 5:30 pm	Skilled Park	Tony De Las Heras; Gerard Sutton	12,997
Canberra Raiders	25–12	Parramatta Eels	25 June 2011, 7:30 pm	Canberra Stadium	Chris James; Jared Maxwell	13,457
New Zealand Warriors	8–16	Melbourne Storm	26 June 2011, 2:00 pm	Mt Smart Stadium	Tony Archer; Brett Suttor	13,362
Penrith Panthers	30–20	North Queensland Cowboys	26 June 2011, 2:00 pm	Centrebet Stadium	Phil Haines; Ashley Klein	14,090
Newcastle Knights	18–10	Sydney Roosters	26 June 2011, 3:00 pm	Ausgrid Stadium	Ben Cummins; Adam Devcich	22,326
St George Illawarra Dragons	24–6	Manly-Warringah Sea Eagles	27 June 2011, 7:00 pm	WIN Stadium	Shayne Hayne; Gavin Badger	18,947

- After three previous unsuccessful attempts, the Cronulla-Sutherland Sharks won its first game on the Gold Coast against the Gold Coast Titans.
- Newcastle defeated the Sydney Roosters on its home ground for the first time since 2001.

Source: NRL 2011 Round 16 – RL Project

=== Round 17 ===
Home	Score	Away	Match Information
Home	Score	Away	Date and Time (Local)	Venue	Referees	Crowd
Parramatta Eels	12–16	Brisbane Broncos	1 July 2011, 7:45 pm	Parramatta Stadium	Jarred Maxwell; Phil Haines	11,079
Penrith Panthers	20–6	Canterbury Bankstown Bulldogs	2 July 2011, 7:30 pm	Centrebet Stadium	Jason Robinson; Brett Suttor	15,383
Cronulla-Sutherland Sharks	26–4	South Sydney Rabbitohs	3 July 2011, 2:00 pm	Toyota Stadium	Chris James; Steve Lyons	18,829
St George Illawarra Dragons	10–14	Newcastle Knights	3 July 2011, 3:00 pm	WIN Stadium	Ben Cummins; Alan Shortall	17,205
Sydney Roosters	12–38	Canberra Raiders	4 July 2011, 7:00 pm	Sydney Football Stadium	Matt Cecchin; Harry Peranara	9,817

BYE: 6 teams – New Zealand Warriors, Wests Tigers, Melbourne Storm, North Queensland Cowboys, Manly Sea Eagles, Gold Coast Titans.
Source NRL 2011 Round 17 – RL Project

- Players selected for Game Three of the 2011 State of Origin series were unavailable to play NRL matches for this round.
- The Canberra Raiders defeated the Sydney Roosters at the Sydney Football Stadium for the first time since 1995.

=== Round 18 ===
Home	Score	Away	Match Information
Home	Score	Away	Date and Time (Local)	Venue	Referees	Crowd
Parramatta Eels	22–6	Wests Tigers	8 July 2011, 7:35 pm	Parramatta Stadium	Ben Cummins; Phil Haines	19,654
New Zealand Warriors	22–6	Gold Coast Titans	8 July 2011, 8:30 pm	Mt Smart Stadium	Gavin Badger; Adam Devcich	10,780
Cronulla-Sutherland Sharks	26–12	Canberra Raiders	9 July 2011, 5:30 pm	Toyota Stadium	Jason Robinson; Gerard Sutton	10,303
Canterbury-Bankstown Bulldogs	18–28	Melbourne Storm	9 July 2011, 7:30 pm	Adelaide Oval	Chris James; Steve Lyons	9,963
Sydney Roosters	34–26	Penrith Panthers	10 July 2011, 2:00 pm	Sydney Football Stadium	Matt Cecchin; Henry Perenara	9,713
Manly-Warringah Sea Eagles	36–22	South Sydney Rabbitohs	10 July 2011, 3:00 pm	Brookvale Oval	Ashley Klein; Brett Suttor	19,856
Newcastle Knights	12–22	North Queensland Cowboys	11 July 2011, 7:00 pm	Ausgrid Stadium	Jarred Maxwell; Tony De Las Heras	17,212

BYE: 2 teams – St George Illawarra Dragons, Brisbane Broncos
Source: NRL 2011 Round 18 – RL Project

- In his first game back from retirement, Mat Rogers of the Gold Coast Titans played his 200th NRL game.
- Mitchell Pearce of the Sydney Roosters played his 100th NRL game.
- Colin Best of the Cronulla Sharks scored his 100th NRL try.
- Daniel Tolar of the Newcastle Knights played his 100th NRL game.

=== Round 19 – Rivalry Round ===
Home	Score	Away	Match Information
Home	Score	Away	Date and Time (Local)	Venue	Referees	Crowd
Brisbane Broncos	30–10	Gold Coast Titans	15 July 2011, 7:35 pm	Suncorp Stadium	Gavin Badger; Chris James	31,035
New Zealand Warriors	36–12	Canterbury Bankstown Bulldogs	15 July 2011, 8:30 pm	Mt Smart Stadium	Shayne Hayne; Gavin Reynolds	12,012
South Sydney Rabbitohs	21–20	Sydney Roosters	16 July 2011, 5:30 pm	ANZ Stadium	Brett Suttor; Phil Haines	14,671
North Queensland Cowboys	18–38	Wests Tigers	16 July 2011, 7:30 pm	Dairy Farmers Stadium	Ben Cummins; Gerard Sutton	12,880
Penrith Panthers	23–22	Parramatta Eels	16 July 2011, 7:30 pm	Centrebet Stadium	Jared Maxwell; Alan Shortall	17,333
Canberra Raiders	0–26	Melbourne Storm	17 July 2011, 2:00 pm	Canberra Stadium	Matt Cecchin; Adam Devcich	11,853
Newcastle Knights	10–32	Manly-Warringah Sea Eagles	17 July 2011, 3:00 pm	Ausgrid Stadium	Tony Archer; Ashley Klein	21,798
St George Illawarra Dragons	38–8	Cronulla-Sutherland Sharks	18 July 2011, 7:00 pm	WIN Jubilee Oval	Steve Lyons; Jason Robinson	16,879

Source: NRL 2011 Round 19 – RL Project

- Nathan Hindmarsh of the Parramatta Eels played his 300th NRL game.
- Jason Nightingale of the St George Illawarra Dragons played his 100th NRL game.
- For the first time in its history, the Canberra Raiders were held scoreless on their home ground, Canberra Stadium.
- For the 3rd time since its inception, Golden Point was played twice on the same day, with both the Rabbitohs-Roosters and the Panthers-Eels matches being forced into Golden Point.

=== Round 20 ===
Home	Score	Away	Match Information
Home	Score	Away	Date and Time (Local)	Venue	Referees	Crowd
Canterbury Bankstown Bulldogs	8–7	Parramatta Eels	22 July 2011, 7:35 pm	ANZ Stadium	Alan Shortall; Gerard Sutton	15,126
Melbourne Storm	26–6	Brisbane Broncos	22 July 2011, 7:35 pm	AAMI Park	Tony Archer; Ashley Klein	22,912
Gold Coast Titans	20–28	North Queensland Cowboys	23 July 2011, 5:30 pm	Skilled Park	Jared Maxwell; Harry Perenara	15,741
Cronulla-Sutherland Sharks	0–18	Newcastle Knights	23 July 2011, 7:30 pm	Toyota Stadium	Gavin Badger; Tony De Las Heras	6,513
Wests Tigers	19–12	Sydney Roosters	23 July 2011, 7:30 pm	Leichhardt Oval	Adam Devcich; Jason Robinson	10,178
South Sydney Rabbitohs	16–48	New Zealand Warriors	24 July 2011, 2:00 pm	ANZ Stadium	Matt Cecchin; Chris James	11,208
Penrith Panthers	8–12	Manly-Warringah Sea Eagles	24 July 2011, 3:00 pm	Centrebet Stadium	Ben Cummins; Shayne Hayne	13,832
Canberra Raiders	24–19	St George Illawarra Dragons	25 July 2011, 7:00 pm	Canberra Stadium	Phil Haines; Brett Suttor	10,425

Source: NRL 2011 Round 20 – RL Project

=== Round 21 ===
Home	Score	Away	Match Information
Home	Score	Away	Date and Time (Local)	Venue	Referees	Crowd
Brisbane Broncos	46–16	Cronulla-Sutherland Sharks	29 July 2011, 7:35 pm	Suncorp Stadium	Jared Maxwell; Gavin Morris	24,164
Manly-Warringah Sea Eagles	12–14	Wests Tigers	29 July 2011, 7:35 pm	Bluetongue Stadium	Ashley Klein; Jason Robinson	20,059
Sydney Roosters	32–28	Canterbury Bankstown Bulldogs	30 July 2011, 5:30 pm	Sydney Football Stadium	Ben Cummins; Phil Haines	11,926
North Queensland Cowboys	30–18	Penrith Panthers	30 July 2011, 7:30 pm	Dairy Farmers Stadium	Tony Archer; Chris James	12,349
Newcastle Knights	50–20	Gold Coast Titans	31 July 2011, 2:00 pm	Ausgrid Stadium	Gavin Badger; Alan Shortall	17,327
New Zealand Warriors	29–10	Canberra Raiders	31 July 2011, 2:00 pm	Mt Smart Stadium	Matt Cecchin; Gerard Sutton	14,731
St George Illawarra Dragons	24–34	South Sydney Rabbitohs	31 July 2011, 3:00 pm	WIN Stadium	Adam Devcich; Shayne Hayne	18,980
Parramatta Eels	18–22	Melbourne Storm	1 August 2011, 7:00 pm	Parramatta Stadium	Tony De Las Heras; Steve Lyons	10,078

Source: NRL 2011 Round 21 – RL Project

=== Round 22 ===
Home	Score	Away	Match Information
Home	Score	Away	Date and Time (Local)	Venue	Referees	Crowd
Canterbury-Bankstown Bulldogs	14–6	North Queensland Cowboys	5 August 2011, 7:35 pm	ANZ Stadium	Jared Maxwell; Gavin Morris	8,654
Wests Tigers	16–14	St George Illawarra Dragons	5 August 2011, 7:35 pm	Sydney Football Stadium	Tony Archer; Shayne Hayne	27,687
Melbourne Storm	26–6	Penrith Panthers	6 August 2011, 5:30 pm	AAMI Park	Ben Cummins; Phil Haines	12,162
Brisbane Broncos	21–20	New Zealand Warriors	6 August 2011, 7:30 pm	Suncorp Stadium	Gerald Sutton; Ashley Klein	37,173
Cronulla-Sutherland Sharks	16–20	Gold Coast Titans	6 August 2011, 7:30 pm	Toyota Stadium	David Munro; Gavin Badger	6,313
Newcastle Knights	40–8	Canberra Raiders	7 August 2011, 2:00 pm	Ausgrid Stadium	Brett Suttor; Steve Lyons	14,109
Manly-Warringah Sea Eagles	36–8	Sydney Roosters	7 August 2011, 3:00 pm	Brookvale Oval	Matt Cecchin; Tony De Las Heras	13,743
South Sydney Rabbitohs	56–6	Parramatta Eels	8 August 2011, 7:00 pm	ANZ Stadium	Adam Devcich; Chris James	13,908

Source: NRL 2011 Round 22 – RL Project

- The South Sydney Rabbitohs' 56–6 win over the Parramatta Eels was their biggest ever against them and their largest winning margin since 1980.
- Nathan Merritt became the first player since Francis Meli (in 2003) to score 5 tries in a single NRL game.
- The Gold Coast Titans became the first Gold Coast club to win at the Sharks' home ground.

=== Round 23 ===
Home	Score	Away	Match Information
Home	Score	Away	Date and Time (Local)	Venue	Referees	Crowd
North Queensland Cowboys	16–34	Brisbane Broncos	12 August 2011, 7:35 pm	Dairy Farmers Stadium	Gavin Badger; Matt Cecchin	26,463
Penrith Panthers	18–32	Wests Tigers	12 August 2011, 7:35 pm	Centrebet Stadium	Phil Haines; Ashley Klein	15,152
New Zealand Warriors	20–12	Newcastle Knights	13 August 2011, 5:30 pm	Mt Smart Stadium	Shayne Hayne; Adam Devcich	13,279
Gold Coast Titans	16–40	Melbourne Storm	13 August 2011, 7:30 pm	Skilled Park	Jason Robinson; Alan Shortall	11,663
Parramatta Eels	20–26	Manly-Warringah Sea Eagles	13 August 2011, 7:30 pm	Parramatta Stadium	Tony Archer; Chris James	11,102
Canberra Raiders	18–47	South Sydney Rabbitohs	14 August 2011, 2:00 pm	Canberra Stadium	Tony De Las Heras; Steve Lyons	12,150
St George Illawarra Dragons	12–20	Sydney Roosters	14 August 2011, 3:00 pm	WIN Stadium	Ben Cummins; Gerard Sutton	14,141
Cronulla-Sutherland Sharks	12–19	Canterbury-Bankstown Bulldogs	15 August 2011, 7:00 pm	Toyota Stadium	Jared Maxwell; Gavin Morris	8,089

Source: NRL 2011 Round 23 – RL Project

- Broncos' captain Darren Lockyer became the NRL's all-time most capped player, surpassing both Steve Menzies and Terry Lamb by playing his 350th NRL game.

=== Round 24 ===
Home	Score	Away	Match Information
Home	Score	Away	Date and Time (Local)	Venue	Referees	Crowd
Melbourne Storm	8–6	St George Illawarra Dragons	19 August 2011, 7:35 pm	AAMI Park	Tony Archer; Matt Cecchin	24,081
South Sydney Rabbitohs	26–24	North Queensland Cowboys	19 August 2011, 7:35 pm	ANZ Stadium	Ben Cummins; Adam Devcich	11,208
Gold Coast Titans	26–18	Canberra Raiders	20 August 2011, 5:30 pm	Skilled Park	Tony De Las Heras; Alan Shortall	10,230
Penrith Panthers	12–26	New Zealand Warriors	20 August 2011, 7:30 pm	Centrebet Stadium	Gavin Badger; Brett Suttor	11,644
Sydney Roosters	36–25	Cronulla-Sutherland Sharks	20 August 2011, 7:30 pm	Sydney Football Stadium	Steve Lyons; Adam Gee	8,761
Manly-Warringah Sea Eagles	27–16	Canterbury-Bankstown Bulldogs	21 August 2011, 2:00 pm	Brookvale Oval	Gerard Sutton; Jason Robinson	12,250
Wests Tigers	31–12	Parramatta Eels	21 August 2011, 3:00 pm	Sydney Football Stadium	Jared Maxwell; Chris James	18,626
Newcastle Knights	6–26	Brisbane Broncos	22 August 2011, 7:00 pm	Ausgrid Stadium	Shayne Hayne; Ashley Klein	19,412

Source: NRL 2011 Round 24 – RL Project

- Billy Slater of the Melbourne Storm played his 200th NRL game.
- The Melbourne Storm broke their club record for most consecutive wins by winning their 12th successive game.
- Benji Marshall became the Wests Tigers' highest point scorer, surpassing Brett Hodgson with 797 points.

=== Round 25 ===
Home	Score	Away	Match Information
Home	Score	Away	Date and Time (Local)	Venue	Referees	Crowd
Manly-Warringah Sea Eagles	18–4	Melbourne Storm	26 August 2011, 7:35 pm	Brookvale Oval	Gavin Badger; Shayne Hayne	20,414
Parramatta Eels	12–13	Sydney Roosters	26 August 2011, 7:35 pm	Parramatta Stadium	Jason Robinson; Grant Atkins	12,097
Canterbury-Bankstown Bulldogs	32–22	Newcastle Knights	27 August 2011, 5:30 pm	ANZ Stadium	Matt Cecchin; Adam Devcich	10,257
Canberra Raiders	18–19	Penrith Panthers	27 August 2011, 7:30 pm	Canberra Stadium	Gavin Reynolds; Brett Suttor	10,085
North Queensland Cowboys	28–20	Cronulla-Sutherland Sharks	27 August 2011, 7:30 pm	Dairy Farmers Stadium	Tony De Las Heras; Alan Shortall	12,655
St George Illawarra Dragons	26–22	New Zealand Warriors	28 August 2011, 2:00 pm	WIN Stadium	Ben Cummins; Ashley Klein	15,732
Brisbane Broncos	22–10	South Sydney Rabbitohs	28 August 2011, 3:00 pm	Suncorp Stadium	Tony Archer; Jared Maxwell	40,094
Wests Tigers	39–10	Gold Coast Titans	29 August 2011, 7:00 pm	Campbelltown Stadium	Phil Haines; Steve Lyons	14,378

Source: NRL 2011 Round 25 – RL Project

- Chris Hicks of the Parramatta Eels played his 200th NRL game.
- Alan Tongue of the Canberra Raiders played his final Canberra home game before retiring at the end of the 2011 Season
- Glenn Stewart and Adam Blair were sent off in the Manly Sea Eagles–Melbourne Storm game due to a massive brawl that was nicknamed Battle of Brookvale.

=== Round 26 ===
Home	Score	Away	Match Information
Home	Score	Away	Date and Time (Local)	Venue	Referees	Crowd
Newcastle Knights	40–24	South Sydney Rabbitohs	2 September 2011, 7:35 pm	Ausgrid Stadium	Matt Cecchin; Shayne Hayne	30,729
St. George Illawarra Dragons	32–12	Penrith Panthers	2 September 2011, 7:35 pm	WIN Stadium	Gavin Badger; Phil Haines	13,621
Cronulla-Sutherland Sharks	22–30	Wests Tigers	3 September 2011, 7:30 pm	Toyota Stadium	Gerard Sutton; Ben Cummins	16,879
Gold Coast Titans	12–32	Parramatta Eels	3 September 2011, 7:30 pm	Skilled Park	Chris James; Brett Suttor	18,265
New Zealand Warriors	18–6	North Queensland Cowboys	3 September 2011, 7:30 pm	Mt Smart Stadium	Tony Archer; Ashley Klein	20,062
Canterbury-Bankstown Bulldogs	36–22	Canberra Raiders	4 September 2011, 2:00 pm	ANZ Stadium	Tony De Las Heras; Steve Lyons	16,206
Brisbane Broncos	18–10	Manly-Warringah Sea Eagles	4 September 2011, 4:00 pm	Suncorp Stadium	Adam Devcich; Jared Maxwell	50,859
Sydney Roosters	40–8	Melbourne Storm	4 September 2011, 7:00 pm	Sydney Football Stadium	Jason Robinson; Alan Shortall	8,753

Source: NRL 2011 Round 26 – RL Project

- Akuila Uate of the Newcastle Knights scored four tries against the Rabbitohs to equal the club record for most tries by one player in a match.
- Paul Gallen of the Cronulla-Sutherland Sharks played his 200th NRL game.
- Alan Tongue of the Canberra Raiders Played his last ever NRL match against the Canterbury Bulldogs.

== Finals ==
=== Qualifying finals ===
Home	Score	Away	Match Information
Home	Score	Away	Date and Time (Local)	Venue	Referees	Crowd
Wests Tigers	21–12	St George Illawarra Dragons	9 September 2011, 7:45 pm	ANZ Stadium	Tony Archer; Matt Cecchin	45,631
Brisbane Broncos	40–10	New Zealand Warriors	10 September 2011, 6:45 pm	Suncorp Stadium	Jared Maxwell; Shayne Hayne	48,943
Manly-Warringah Sea Eagles	42–8	North Queensland Cowboys	10 September 2011, 8:30 pm	Sydney Football Stadium	Ben Cummins; Gavin Badger	13,972
Melbourne Storm	18–8	Newcastle Knights	11 September 2011, 4:00 pm	AAMI Park	Ashley Klein; Adam Devcich	14,845
Eliminated: North Queensland Cowboys, Newcastle Knights

- For the first time since the McIntyre final eight system was implemented, all the top 4 ranked teams won in the first week of the finals.
- The Wests Tigers, playing their 300th premiership match, broke their club record for most consecutive wins by winning their 9th successive game.
- As well as amassing their highest score in a finals game, the Manly-Warringah Sea Eagles scored the most points in a single half of finals football, coming from 8–0 down at half-time to win 42–8.

==== Semi finals ====
Home	Score	Away	Match Information
Home	Score	Away	Date and Time (Local)	Venue	Referees	Crowd
Wests Tigers	20–22	New Zealand Warriors	16 September 2011, 7:45 pm	Sydney Football Stadium	Shane Hayne; Jared Maxwell	27,109
Brisbane Broncos	13 – 12 a.e.t	St George Illawarra Dragons	17 September 2011, 6:45 pm	Suncorp Stadium	Matt Cecchin; Tony Archer	48,444
Eliminated: Wests Tigers, St George Illawarra Dragons

- For the second time in three seasons Brisbane and St. George Illawarra met in the same stage of the semi-finals. As they did in 2009, the Broncos won the match, albeit in extra time, thus ending the Dragons' coaching career of Wayne Bennett. It was also in exactly the same stage in 2008 when his coaching stint at the Broncos came to an end, at the hands of the Melbourne Storm, in a controversial semi-final. It would not be until 2015 that Bennett would win a finals match at Suncorp Stadium.
- As of 2026, this is the most recent time that the Wests Tigers has played a finals match.

==== Preliminary finals ====
Home	Score	Away	Match Information
Home	Score	Away	Date and Time (Local)	Venue	Referees	Crowd
Manly-Warringah Sea Eagles	26–14	Brisbane Broncos	23 September 2011, 7:45 pm	Sydney Football Stadium	Shayne Hayne; Jared Maxwell	31,894
Melbourne Storm	12–20	New Zealand Warriors	24 September 2011, 7:45 pm	AAMI Park	Tony Archer; Matt Cecchin	28,580
Eliminated: Brisbane Broncos, Melbourne Storm

- Melbourne became the first minor premier since Parramatta in 2005 to lose a preliminary final. As well as this, it was their first ever loss in a preliminary final.

==== Grand final ====
Home	Score	Away	Match Information
Home	Score	Away	Date and Time (Local)	Venue	Referees	Crowd
Manly-Warringah Sea Eagles	24–10	New Zealand Warriors	2 October, 5:30 pm	ANZ Stadium	Tony Archer; Matt Cecchin	81,988
