= Manly–Melbourne NRL rivalry =

Football competitive spirit in Australia

- Location: Brookvale Oval and Melbourne Rectangular Stadium
- Teams: Manly-Warringah Sea Eagles; Melbourne Storm
- First meeting: 10 July 1998
- Latest meeting: Manly-Warringah 30 – 4 Melbourne (27 June 2026)
- Next meeting: TBD

Statistics
- Total meetings: 47
- Most wins: Melbourne Storm (27)
- All-time series (National Rugby League only): Melbourne: 27 wins Manly-Warringah: 19 wins 1 draw
- Regular season series: Melbourne: 23 wins Manly-Warringah: 18 wins 1 draw
- Postseason results: Melbourne: 4 wins Manly-Warringah: 1 win
- Largest victory: Melbourne – 34 points (30 July 2017); Manly-Warringah – 40 points (5 October 2008)

The Manly–Melbourne NRL rivalry is between two National Rugby League clubs, the Manly-Warringah Sea Eagles and the Melbourne Storm, who are engaged in a modern-day rivalry. They have met 46 times since 1998, with Melbourne leading the head-to-head 27–18; there has also been a drawn match between the two sides. They have finished three regular seasons as the top two placed sides on the premiership ladder (2007, 2008 and 2011), although in the cases of 2007 and 2008, Melbourne had those minor premierships stripped from them due to the discovery of salary cap breaches in April 2010.

== History ==
=== 1998–2005 ===
The Melbourne Storm and Manly-Warringah Sea Eagles first met in Round 18 of the 1998 NRL season, with the Storm winning 22–12 at Olympic Park Stadium. During the 2000-02 Northern Eagles period, Melbourne won three games over the failed joint venture and lost two. However Manly's first official victory over the Storm came soon after they were re-instated to the NRL in Round 6 of the 2003 season, with a 20–14 victory at Brookvale Oval.

The rivalry began in 2005, when Manly and Melbourne met in an early-season top-of-the-table clash at Brookvale Oval. The Sea Eagles defeated the Storm 25–18, on their way to reaching their first finals series since 1998. This match also marked the NRL debut of Steve Matai for the Manly-Warringah club.

=== 2006–2009 ===
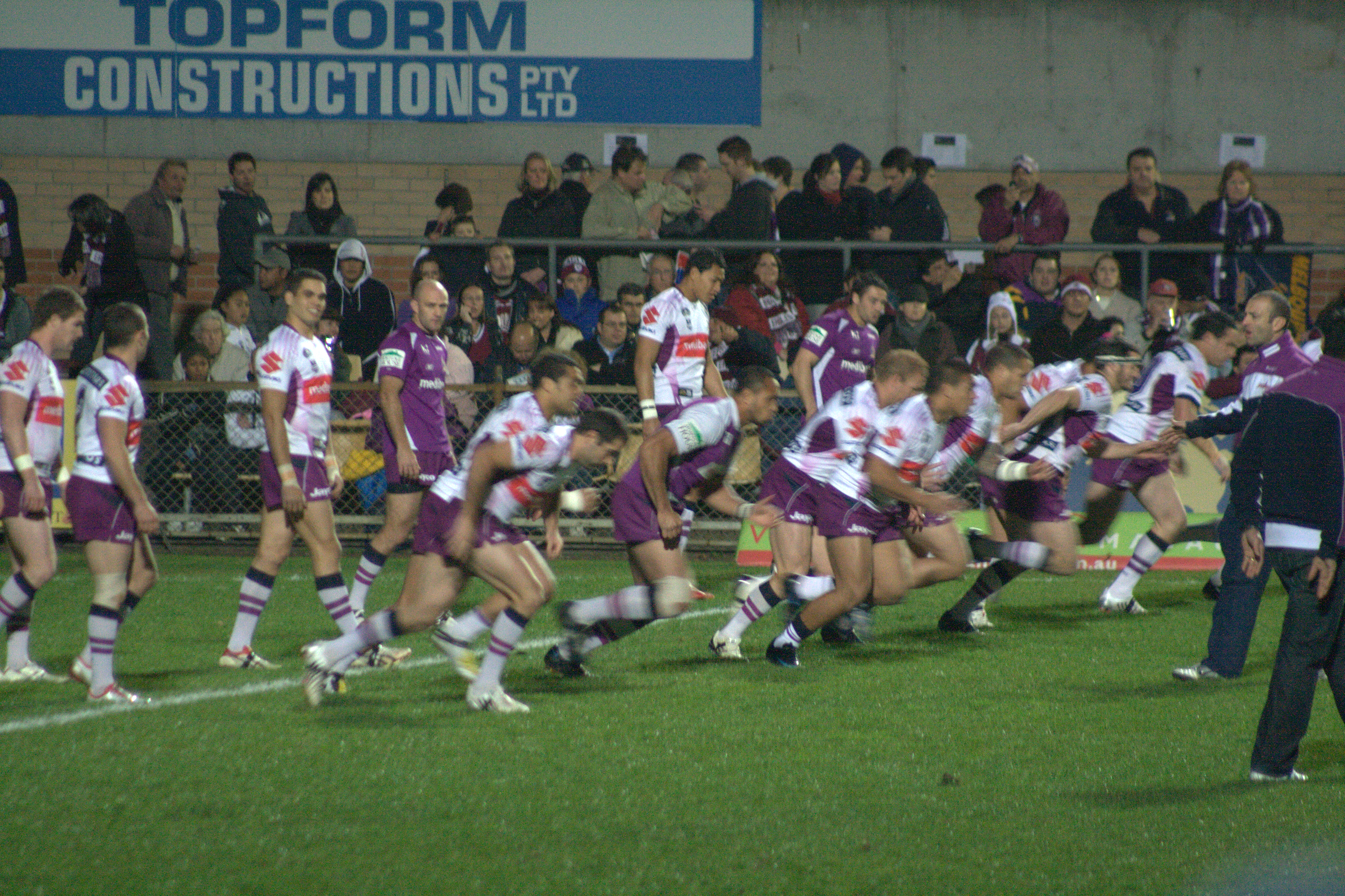
The Storm warming up before a match against the Sea Eagles in 2008

Throughout 2007, Melbourne and Manly were in a two-way tussle for top spot on the ladder for much of the season. They met only once during the regular season, in Round 11, with Manly winning a close and physical match 13–12; the match also featured two serious injuries, whereby Billy Slater copped an accidental knee from team-mate Sam Tagataese and George Rose suffered a horrific leg injury.

The two teams would later feature in the 2007 NRL Grand Final, the first of two consecutive Grand Finals played between the two clubs. Melbourne defeated Manly-Warringah 34–8 to win their second premiership, in a match which was notable for Melbourne enforcer Michael Crocker taking out Manly fullback Brett Stewart early in the second half with a hard but legal tackle; however, on 22 April 2010, Melbourne would be stripped of this premiership due to the discovery of salary cap breaches throughout the courses of the 2006–10 seasons.

There were three meetings between the two clubs in 2008. Melbourne won both of their regular season meetings, including in the Grand Final replay in Round 5, and also at Brookvale Oval later in the season, though it was Manly-Warringah that won the match that mattered the most, the 2008 NRL Grand Final; in a rematch of the previous year's premiership decider, Manly-Warringah would record a 40–0 victory to win their seventh premiership title and in the process deny the Melbourne club back-to-back premierships. Two of Manly's standout performers on the day were Winger Michael Robertson, who equaled the Grand Final record by scoring three tries, and Clive Churchill Medal winner, Prop-forward Brent Kite. This loss was the third worst defeat in Melbourne's history, and it was the first time since 1978 that the losing team did not score a point (coincidentally, Manly also won the 1978 GF replay defeating Cronulla-Sutherland 16–0 after the original GF had been drawn 11-all). Manly's 40–0 win over Melbourne also broke the record winning margin for a Grand Final, beating the 38–0 win by Eastern Suburbs over St George in 1975.

The rivalry remained strong after 2008, despite there being no subsequent Grand Final meetings between the two clubs. The two teams traded victories at each other's home grounds in 2009, with Melbourne winning at Brookvale Oval in Round 8 and Manly winning in Melbourne for the first time in Round 24, before Melbourne defeated Manly 40–12 in the qualifying final at Etihad Stadium en route to winning another premiership which would also later be stripped from them due to salary cap breaches.

=== 2010–present ===
Manly won both of their premiership meetings in 2010, first at Etihad Stadium in Round 6 by 18–16 (in the last match before the Storm's breaches of the salary cap between 2006 and 2010 were uncovered) and then at Brookvale Oval in Round 22 by 26–6. In both matches, Manly led 18–6 at half-time.

Melbourne then claimed its first victory over Manly since 2009 in Round 1, 2011 in a match in which they could compete for premiership points for the first time since that year, before Manly won a close, but brutal and violent match later in the season, known as the "Battle of Brookvale", where a minor scuffle erupted between Glenn Stewart and Adam Blair, resulting in both players being sin-binned (and later sent off) after joining in a scuffle between Darcy Lussick and Ryan Hinchcliffe. This was the first match attended by David Gallop of either side since suspending Brett Stewart from the first four weeks of the 2009 season for a sexual assault charge for which he would later be exonerated, and since stripping the Storm of two premiership titles and three minor premiership titles for salary cap breaches; extra security was hired for his presence at the game. Of the match itself, Gallop said:

The sight of so many players from both teams fighting, of people running in and leaving the bench area, was an horrendous look for the game.

— David Gallop

In the immediate fallout from the match, both teams were fined $50,000 each and a total of ten players were charged by the NRL judiciary system. At the conclusion of the season, Melbourne and Manly finished as the top two teams on the premiership ladder for the third time in five years. They were destined to face each other in the Grand Final, but whilst the Manly-Warringah did ultimately make the decider (and went on to win), Melbourne were defeated in the preliminary final by the New Zealand Warriors.

The two teams met twice in 2012, with Melbourne winning both times; first at Brookvale Oval in Round 15 by 26–22, followed by a 40–12 victory in the preliminary final at AAMI Park en route to their second valid premiership and first since the salary cap breaches.

Their first meeting in 2013, in Round 10, produced the first draw between the two clubs, with the final score being 10–all. They met again later in the season, in Round 25, with Manly winning 28–8.

The two meetings between the sides in 2014 were both won by Melbourne: the first was a golden point, 23–22 victory in the opening round, in which Storm captain Cameron Smith kicked his first career field goal in extra time; Melbourne had trailed 20–4 at half-time. The second match saw the Storm also come from behind to win 22–19 over an injury-hit Manly side with debutant Kurt Mann scoring the match winning try with four minutes left.

Manly won both of their meetings in 2015, including winning at AAMI Park for the first time. Despite their two wins against Melbourne, Manly-Warringah faced a decline in the league by failing to make the top eight for the first time since 2004.

In 2016, the sides met in round 24 where Melbourne won 38–18, claiming the minor premiership in the process, whilst Manly missed the finals for the second consecutive season.

Melbourne won both meetings in 2017, first holding off a second half fight back by Manly at Brookvale to win 30–26 before defeating Manly 40–6 at AAMI Park in what was Cameron Smith's 350th NRL game.

The first meeting held between Manly and Melbourne for season 2018 in round eleven at AAMI Park was marred by controversy. While Manly won the match by 24–4 against a Melbourne side missing suspended captain Cameron Smith, the match was perhaps best remembered for a series of on-field incidents including four sin-binnings (Jake Trbojevic, Dylan Walker, Apisai Koroisau and Josh Addo-Carr) and the first send-off since 2015 courtesy of Curtis Scott throwing punches at Walker during a brawl reminiscent of the one between the two sides almost seven years prior. More drama occurred when Koroisau returned to the field one minute and 41 seconds earlier than he should've, presumably due to a timekeeping error. Melbourne lodged an official protest as a result.

In 2019, Manly-Warringah handed Melbourne just their third loss of the season, winning 11–10 in golden point extra time with captain Daly Cherry-Evans kicking the winning field goal in the final minute of extra time.

In 2025, Melbourne ended a three-match losing streak at Brookvale Oval, scoring the highest score in matches between these two teams in a 48–24 victory.

== Statistics ==
=== Head to Head ===
Team	Played	Won	Drawn	Lost	PF	PA	PD
Melbourne Storm	47	27	1	19	1044	787	+257
Manly-Warringah Sea Eagles	47	19	1	27	787	1044	-257

This table only includes competitive matches, excluding all pre-season trials

=== Results ===
This table only shows competitive matches, and not pre-season or exhibition matches. Scores list home team first

Date	Season	Round	Home team	Away team	Venue	Score	Attendance	Report
Friday, 10 July	1998	18	Melbourne Storm	Manly-Warringah Sea Eagles	Olympic Park Stadium	22–12	13,120	
Saturday, 15 May	1999	11	Melbourne Storm	Manly-Warringah Sea Eagles	Olympic Park Stadium	28–6	11,743	
Sunday, 27 June	1999	17	Manly-Warringah Sea Eagles	Melbourne Storm	Brookvale Oval	18–19	7,084	
Sunday, 20 April	2003	6	Manly-Warringah Sea Eagles	Melbourne Storm	Brookvale Oval	20–14	7,588	
Saturday, 6 September	2003	26	Melbourne Storm	Manly-Warringah Sea Eagles	Olympic Park Stadium	40–10	10,020	
Sunday, 5 September	2004	26	Manly-Warringah Sea Eagles	Melbourne Storm	Brookvale Oval	30–28	9,790	
Sunday, 27 March	2005	3	Manly-Warringah Sea Eagles	Melbourne Storm	Brookvale Oval	25–18	15,470	
Saturday, 20 May	2006	11	Manly-Warringah Sea Eagles	Melbourne Storm	Brookvale Oval	34–12	9,338	
Saturday, 6 September	2006	26	Melbourne Storm	Manly-Warringah Sea Eagles	Olympic Park Stadium	30–20	13,991	
Saturday, 26 May	2007	11	Manly-Warringah Sea Eagles	Melbourne Storm	Brookvale Oval	13–12	18,640	
Sunday, 30 September	2007	GF	Melbourne Storm	Manly-Warringah Sea Eagles	Telstra Stadium	34–8	81,392	
Friday, 11 April	2008	5	Melbourne Storm	Manly-Warringah Sea Eagles	Olympic Park Stadium	26–4	13,632	
Friday, 8 August	2008	22	Manly-Warringah Sea Eagles	Melbourne Storm	Brookvale Oval	10–16	18,442	
Sunday, 5 October	2008	GF	Manly-Warringah Sea Eagles	Melbourne Storm	ANZ Stadium	40–0	80,388	
Friday, 1 May	2009	8	Manly-Warringah Sea Eagles	Melbourne Storm	Brookvale Oval	8–22	10,752	
Sunday, 23 August	2009	24	Melbourne Storm	Manly-Warringah Sea Eagles	Olympic Park Stadium	16–20	12,601	
Friday, 11 September	2009	QF	Melbourne Storm	Manly-Warringah Sea Eagles	Etihad Stadium	40–12	21,155	
Monday, 19 April	2010	6	Melbourne Storm	Manly-Warringah Sea Eagles	Etihad Stadium	16–18	14,171	
Saturday, 7 August	2010	22	Manly-Warringah Sea Eagles	Melbourne Storm	Brookvale Oval	26–6	12,550	
Saturday, 12 March	2011	1	Melbourne Storm	Manly-Warringah Sea Eagles	AAMI Park	18–6	14,651	
Friday, 26 August	2011	25	Manly-Warringah Sea Eagles	Melbourne Storm	Brookvale Oval	18–4	20,414	
Monday, 18 June	2012	15	Manly-Warringah Sea Eagles	Melbourne Storm	Brookvale Oval	22–26	12,106	
Friday, 21 September	2012	PF	Melbourne Storm	Manly-Warringah Sea Eagles	AAMI Park	40–12	25,543	
Monday, 20 May	2013	10	Melbourne Storm	Manly-Warringah Sea Eagles	AAMI Park	10–10	12,961	
Saturday, 31 August	2013	25	Manly-Warringah Sea Eagles	Melbourne Storm	Brookvale Oval	28–8	17,179	
Saturday, 8 March	2014	1	Manly-Warringah Sea Eagles	Melbourne Storm	Brookvale Oval	22–23	14,200	
Saturday, 10 May	2014	10	Melbourne Storm	Manly-Warringah Sea Eagles	AAMI Park	22–19	13,273	
Saturday, 14 March	2015	2	Manly-Warringah Sea Eagles	Melbourne Storm	Brookvale Oval	24–22	10,531	
Saturday, 25 April	2015	8	Melbourne Storm	Manly-Warringah Sea Eagles	AAMI Park	10–12	13,948	
Saturday, 20 August	2016	24	Manly-Warringah Sea Eagles	Melbourne Storm	Brookvale Oval	18–38	8,241	
Saturday, 15 April	2017	7	Manly-Warringah Sea Eagles	Melbourne Storm	Brookvale Oval	26–30	10,144	
Sunday, 30 July	2017	21	Melbourne Storm	Manly-Warringah Sea Eagles	AAMI Park	40–6	15,036	
Saturday, 19 May	2018	11	Melbourne Storm	Manly-Warringah Sea Eagles	AAMI Park	4–24	13,172	
Saturday, 27 July	2019	19	Melbourne Storm	Manly-Warringah Sea Eagles	AAMI Park	11–10	14,836	
Saturday, 31 August	2019	24	Manly-Warringah Sea Eagles	Melbourne Storm	Brookvale Oval	6–36	14,640	
Sunday, 15 March	2020	1	Manly-Warringah Sea Eagles	Melbourne Storm	Brookvale Oval	4–18	10,315	
Sunday, 30 August	2020	16	Melbourne Storm	Manly-Warringah Sea Eagles	Sunshine Coast Stadium	30–6	2,910	
Saturday, 7 August	2021	21	Manly-Warringah Sea Eagles	Melbourne Storm	Suncorp Stadium	18–28	0	
Friday, 10 September	2021	QF	Melbourne Storm	Manly-Warringah Sea Eagles	Sunshine Coast Stadium	40–12	9,120	
Thursday, 26 May	2022	12	Melbourne Storm	Manly-Warringah Sea Eagles	AAMI Park	28–8	10,168	
Thursday, 30 June	2022	16	Manly-Warringah Sea Eagles	Melbourne Storm	Brookvale Oval	36–30	8,168	
Friday, 14 April	2023	7	Manly-Warringah Sea Eagles	Melbourne Storm	Brookvale Oval	18–8	13,573	
Saturday, 24 June	2023	17	Melbourne Storm	Manly-Warringah Sea Eagles	AAMI Park	24–6	13,198	
Friday, 24 May	2024	12	Manly-Warringah Sea Eagles	Melbourne Storm	Brookvale Oval	26–20	17,211	
Sunday, 6 April	2025	5	Manly-Warringah Sea Eagles	Melbourne Storm	Brookvale Oval	24–48	17,346	
Saturday, 19 July	2025	20	Melbourne Storm	Manly-Warringah Sea Eagles	AAMI Park	16–18	19,011	
Saturday, 27 June	2026	17	Manly-Warringah Sea Eagles	Melbourne Storm	Brookvale Oval	30–4		

=== Attendances ===
- Highest attendance:
  - Melbourne Storm at home: 25,543 – Melbourne Storm 40 – 12 Manly-Warringah Sea Eagles, Preliminary Final, 2012
  - Manly-Warringah Sea Eagles at home: 20,414 – Manly-Warringah Sea Eagles 18 – 4 Melbourne Storm, Round 25, 2011
  - Neutral venue: 81,392 – Melbourne Storm 34 – 8 Manly-Warringah Sea Eagles, 2007 NRL Grand Final, Telstra Stadium
- Lowest attendance:
  - Melbourne Storm at home: 10,020 – Melbourne Storm 40 – 10 Manly-Warringah Sea Eagles, Round 26, 2003
  - Manly-Warringah Sea Eagles at home: 7,084 – Manly-Warringah Sea Eagles 18 – 19 Melbourne Storm, Round 17, 1999
  - Neutral venue: 0 – Manly-Warringah Sea Eagles 18 – 28 Melbourne Storm, Round 21, 2021, Suncorp Stadium^{1}

^{1} Match was played behind closed doors due to a COVID-19 outbreak in Queensland

=== Players who represented both clubs ===
Player	Melbourne Storm career						Manly-Warringah Sea Eagles career					
Player	Span	Games	Tries	Goals	FG	Points	Span	Games	Tries	Goals	FG	Points
Steven Bell	2001–2005	107	63	0	0	252	2006–2008	65	31	0	0	124
Cheyse Blair	2016–2018	38	18	0	0	78	2014–2015	16	8	0	0	32
Matthew Cross	2009	14	3	0	0	12	2010	16	3	0	0	12
Ian Donnelly	2005–2007	30	1	0	0	4	2004	14	1	0	0	4
Richard Fa'aoso	2012	6	0	0	0	0	2013	18	0	0	0	0
Liam Foran	2008	3	0	0	0	0	2011–2012	7	0	0	0	0
Blake Green	2015–2016	50	10	0	0	40	2017	24	3	0	0	12
Cooper Johns	2020–2022	11	1	0	0	4	2023	8	0	0	0	0
Ben MacDougall	2004	22	7	0	0	28	2003	23	8	0	0	32
Nate Myles	2017	3	0	0	0	0	2016–2017	26	0	0	0	0
Matt Orford	2001–2005	120	52	333	3	877	2006–2009	98	17	242	9	561
George Rose	2014	9	0	0	0	0	2006–2013	129	10	0	0	40
Siosaia Vave	2012–2013	23	1	0	0	4	2016	23	1	0	0	4

== See also ==
- Rivalries in the National Rugby League
