= Battle of Brookvale =

2011 rugby league match in Australia

- Cover of Big League match programme
| Manly-Warringah Sea Eagles | Melbourne Storm |
|---|---|
| 18 | 4 |
| | 1 | 2 | Total |
|---|---|---|---|
| MAN | 14 | 4 | 18 |
| MEL | 0 | 4 | 4 |
- Date: 26 August 2011
- Stadium: Brookvale Oval
- Location: Brookvale, New South Wales
- Referees: Shayne Hayne, Gavin Badger
- Attendance: 20,414

Broadcast partners
- Broadcasters: Nine Network
- Commentators: Ray Warren; Peter Sterling; Phil Gould; Wally Lewis (sideline)

The Battle of Brookvale was the unofficial name given to the Round 25, 2011 National Rugby League (NRL) match between the Manly Warringah Sea Eagles and Melbourne Storm, played at Brookvale Oval on 26 August 2011.

A number of incidents in the first half led to some fights breaking out all over the ground, eventually turning into a five-minute brawl involving all players on the ground. Following the brawl, Manly went on to win the match 18–4, on its way to finishing second on the premiership ladder.

Several players faced charges at the NRL Judiciary with several suspensions and fines being handed out.

== Background ==
Between 2000 - 2010, the Manly Warringah Sea Eagles and the Melbourne Storm engaged in a rivalry which included several close matches, some upset victories, and a Grand Final victory to each side. Since 2006, ten of fourteen Grand Finals have featured either one or both clubs, and, in the five of six seasons between 2007 and 2012, one of these teams won the premiership, though the Storm's 2007 and 2009 titles (the former of which was won by defeating Manly in the Grand Final) were later stripped from the club as a result of salary cap breaches exposed by the NRL in 2010.

The height of this rivalry came with the two clubs' meetings in the 2007 and 2008 NRL Grand Finals. Melbourne defeated Manly 34–8 to win the 2007 title, whilst Manly reversed the result and won by a record 40–0 scoreline in 2008. They have also featured in three other finals matches, with Melbourne winning all three by the scoreline of 40–12 in the 2009 qualifying final, the 2012 preliminary final and the 2021 first qualifying final.

This was to be the first match attended by then NRL chief executive officer David Gallop of either side since suspending Brett Stewart for the first four weeks of the 2009 season for a sexual assault charge for which he would later be acquitted of, and since stripping the Storm of two premiership titles and three minor premiership titles for salary cap breaches; extra security was hired for his presence at the game.

In the preview for the match, the official programme Big League noted that the feud between the teams was "set to reignite," but that there was a "mutual respect between the two clubs". Melbourne entered the match on top of the NRL ladder, on a 12-match winning streak, while Manly were in second position having won their three previous matches.

== During the match ==
=== Before the brawl ===
Kieran Foran scored the first try of the match for the Sea Eagles early in the first half, after Billy Slater misjudged a ball which had bounced in the Sea Eagles' in-goal area.

In the 23rd minute of the match, Manly winger David Williams suffered a neck injury, which resulted in play being suspended whilst he was carried off the stretcher. In stark contrast to what would come later in the game, Billy Slater who had tackled Williams (Williams had hit Slater's chest with the top of his head which caused the injury), realising there was a neck injury, cradled Williams and wouldn't let him move or his Manly team mates move him until the medical staff arrived.

=== The brawl ===
Shortly after the Williams injury, Melbourne interchange forward Ryan Hinchcliffe conceded a penalty when he struck Manly's Darcy Lussick close to the Sea Eagles' line. This resulted in a brawl between the two players, following which Adam Blair and Glenn Stewart were sin-binned for joining in.

On their way to the dressing rooms, a major brawl erupted between Blair and Stewart, which involved players and officials from both sides; the two subsequently had their sin-bin punishments upgraded to a send off, meaning they would take no further part in the match.

Apart from the main culprits, many other players, including Brett Stewart, also joined in the brawl, with Stewart claiming that he was acting in self-defence of his older brother. Officials and trainers from both clubs also joined in the brawl.

=== After the brawl ===
Manly captain Jamie Lyon converted a penalty goal from the Hinchcliffe penalty from right in front, extending the Sea Eagles' lead to 8–0. The Sea Eagles would eventually win 18–4 with a late Billy Slater try preventing the Storm from being held scoreless for the first time since the 2008 NRL Grand Final.

== Teams ==
Melbourne were missing regular halfback Cooper Cronk due to a foot injury, with Jesse Bromwich also missing the match after being named in the original squad.

Team details
| Manly Warringah Sea Eagles | | Position | Melbourne Storm |
| Name | Number | Position | Number | Name |
|---|---|---|---|---|
| Brett Stewart | 1 | Fullback | 1 | Billy Slater |
| Michael Robertson | 2 | Wing | 2 | Matthew Duffie |
| Jamie Lyon (c) | 3 | Centre | 3 | Dane Nielsen |
| Steve Matai | 4 | Centre | 4 | Beau Champion |
| David Williams | 5 | Wing | 5 | Anthony Quinn |
| Kieran Foran | 6 | Five eighth | 6 | Rory Kostjasyn |
| Daly Cherry-Evans | 7 | Half back | 7 | Gareth Widdop |
| Joe Galuvao | 12 | Prop forward | 8 | Bryan Norrie |
| Matt Ballin | 9 | Hooker | 9 | Cameron Smith (c) |
| Brent Kite | 10 | Prop forward | 17 | Jaiman Lowe |
| Anthony Watmough | 11 | Second row | 11 | Adam Blair |
| Shane Rodney | 16 | Second row | 16 | Todd Lowrie |
| Glenn Stewart | 13 | Lock forward | 13 | Kevin Proctor |
| George Rose | 8 | Interchange | 12 | Sika Manu |
| Darcy Lussick | 14 | Interchange | 14 | Ryan Hinchcliffe |
| Jamie Buhrer | 15 | Interchange | 15 | Sisa Waqa |
| Tony Williams | 17 | Interchange | 16 | Adam Woolnough |
| Des Hasler | | Coach | | Craig Bellamy |
RLP

== Match details ==
26 August 2011
19:35 AEST (UTC+10)

| Manly Warringah Sea Eagles | 18 – 4 | Melbourne Storm |
|---|---|---|
| Tries: 3 T Williams 36', 57'; Foran 5'; Goals: 3 Lyon 6', pen 27', 37' (3/4); Sin bin: G Stewart (yellow card); Sent off: G Stewart (red card) 27' | 1st: 14–0; 2nd: 4–4; Report | Tries: 1 Slater 80'; Goals: 0 Widdop (0/1); Sin bin: Blair (yellow card); Sent off: Blair (red card) 27' |

Brookvale Oval, Sydney
Attendance: 20,414
Referees: Shayne Hayne, Gavin Badger
Touch judges: Ricky McFarlane, Paul Holland

== Judiciary ==
No fewer than ten players and two officials from both clubs were later charged by the NRL Judiciary for their roles in the brawl, with both Glenn Stewart and Adam Blair referred straight to the judiciary. Additionally, each club was fined $50,000 from the NRL. For their parts, Stewart and Blair were both banned for three and five matches respectively.

The charges and outcomes were as follows:

=== Manly ===
| Player | Charge | Grade | Outcome |
|---|---|---|---|
| Glenn Stewart | Contrary Conduct – fighting | Referred | Three-match suspension |
| Darcy Lussick | Contrary Conduct | 4 | Three-match suspension (318 demerit points) |
| Brett Stewart | Contrary Conduct | 3 | One-match suspension (162 demerit points) |
| Kieran Foran | Contrary Conduct | 2 | One-match suspension (168 demerit points) |
| Michael Robertson | Contrary Conduct | 1 | No suspension (62 demerit points) |

=== Melbourne ===
| Player | Charge | Grade | Outcome |
|---|---|---|---|
| Adam Blair | Contrary Conduct – fighting | Referred | Five-match suspension |
| Adam Blair | Striking | 2 | Five-match suspension |
| Sisa Waqa | Detrimental Conduct | 2 | One-match suspension (168 demerit points) |
| Bryan Norrie | Detrimental Conduct | 1 | No suspension (62 demerit points) |
| Jaiman Lowe | Detrimental Conduct | 1 | No suspension (93 demerit points) |
| Sika Manu | Detrimental Conduct | 1 | No suspension (52 demerit points) |

== Reaction ==
Then-NRL CEO David Gallop condemned the actions of both teams, saying:

The sight of so many players from both teams fighting, of people running in and leaving the bench area, was a horrendous look for the game.

— David Gallop

Despite the spiteful nature of the match, Melbourne's Billy Slater won universal praise for his actions after the neck injury to Manly winger David Williams.

== Aftermath ==
In the years following this match, matches between the Sea Eagles and Storm played at Brookvale Oval continue to often be called the "Battle of Brookvale", though there have not been any particularly violent matches between the two sides at this venue since. While there is still a healthy rivalry between the two sides in recent years, including another all-in brawl in a match at AAMI Park in Melbourne in 2018, it has not been as strong.

== See also ==
- List of sporting scandals
- Hawthorn v Essendon (2004 AFL season)
