= Col Pearce Medal =

- Awarded for: The Referee of the year in the National Rugby League
- Country: Australia; New Zealand
- First award: 2004
- Currently held by: Gerard Sutton (5th award)

Highlights
- Most awards: Gerard Sutton (5)

The Col Pearce Medal is awarded each year (annually) to the referee judged as being the best referee over the entire National Rugby League (NRL) season in Australia.

== History ==
The award is named after Col Pearce, who was a rugby league referee that referee'd from 1946 until 1968. He referee'd in 343 top grade matches, including 6 Grand Finals. He also referee'd in 9 Test Matches, including 3 World Cup matches. He also helped coach the referee's for much of his later life. Tony Archer has referred to him as the doyen of Referee's.

The idea of a medal for best referee was created by Robert Finch, as he thought there was little recognition given to the best referee in any season.

== Winners ==
Year	Winner
2004	Tim Mander
2005	Paul Simpkins
2006	Steve Clark
2007	Tony Archer
2008	Tony Archer
2009	Shayne Hayne
2010	Tony Archer
2011	Shayne Hayne
2012	Ben Cummins
2013	Shayne Hayne
2014	Gerard Sutton
2015	Gerard Sutton
2016	Ben Cummins
2017	Matt Cecchin
2018	Gerard Sutton
2019	Gerard Sutton
2020	Gerard Sutton

== Multiple winners ==
Medals	Referee	Years
5	Gerard Sutton	2014, 2015, 2018, 2019, 2020
3	Tony Archer	2007, 2008, 2010
3	Shayne Hayne	2009, 2011, 2013
2	Ben Cummins	2012, 2016

== See also ==
- Dally M Medal
