= 2009 NRL Grand Final =

Australian championship rugby league match

Melbourne Storm	Parramatta Eels
23	16
	1	2	Total
MEL	10	13	23
PAR	0	16	16
- Date: Sunday 4 October 2009
- Stadium: ANZ Stadium
- Location: Sydney, NSW, Australia
- Clive Churchill Medallist: Billy Slater (MEL)
- National anthem: (Australia) Mark Vincent
- Referee: Tony Archer; Shayne Hayne; Paul Holland (Touch Judge); David Abood (Touch Judge)
- Attendance: 82,538

Broadcast partners
- Broadcasters: Nine Network
- Commentators: Ray Warren; Peter Sterling; Phil Gould

The 2009 NRL Grand Final (This title stripped) was the conclusive and premiership-deciding game of the NRL's 2009 Telstra Premiership season. Played on 4 October 2009 at Sydney's ANZ Stadium was contested between the Parramatta Eels and the Melbourne Storm, the latter competing in their 4th grand final in a row. That was later stripped from them for breaking the salary cap rule. It was also the first Grand Final to feature the two referee system, with Shayne Hayne and Tony Archer being the first referees to jointly officiate in an NRL Grand Final.

The Melbourne Storm led 10–0 at halftime and fought off a Parramatta comeback to eventually win 23–16 and claim their third premiership since entering the competition. This title was later stripped from the club due to salary cap breaches. Melbourne went on to defeat the Leeds Rhinos, winners of the 2009 Super League Grand Final, in the 2010 World Club Challenge. The latter title was also stripped from the Melbourne club.

== Background ==
The 2009 NRL season was the 102nd season of professional rugby league football club competition in Australia, and the twelfth run by the National Rugby League. For the third consecutive year, sixteen teams competed for the 2009 Telstra Premiership title. The season commenced with the first match played on 13 March and ended with the grand final, played on 4 October. The second season of the National Youth Competition also commenced in line with the Telstra Premiership.

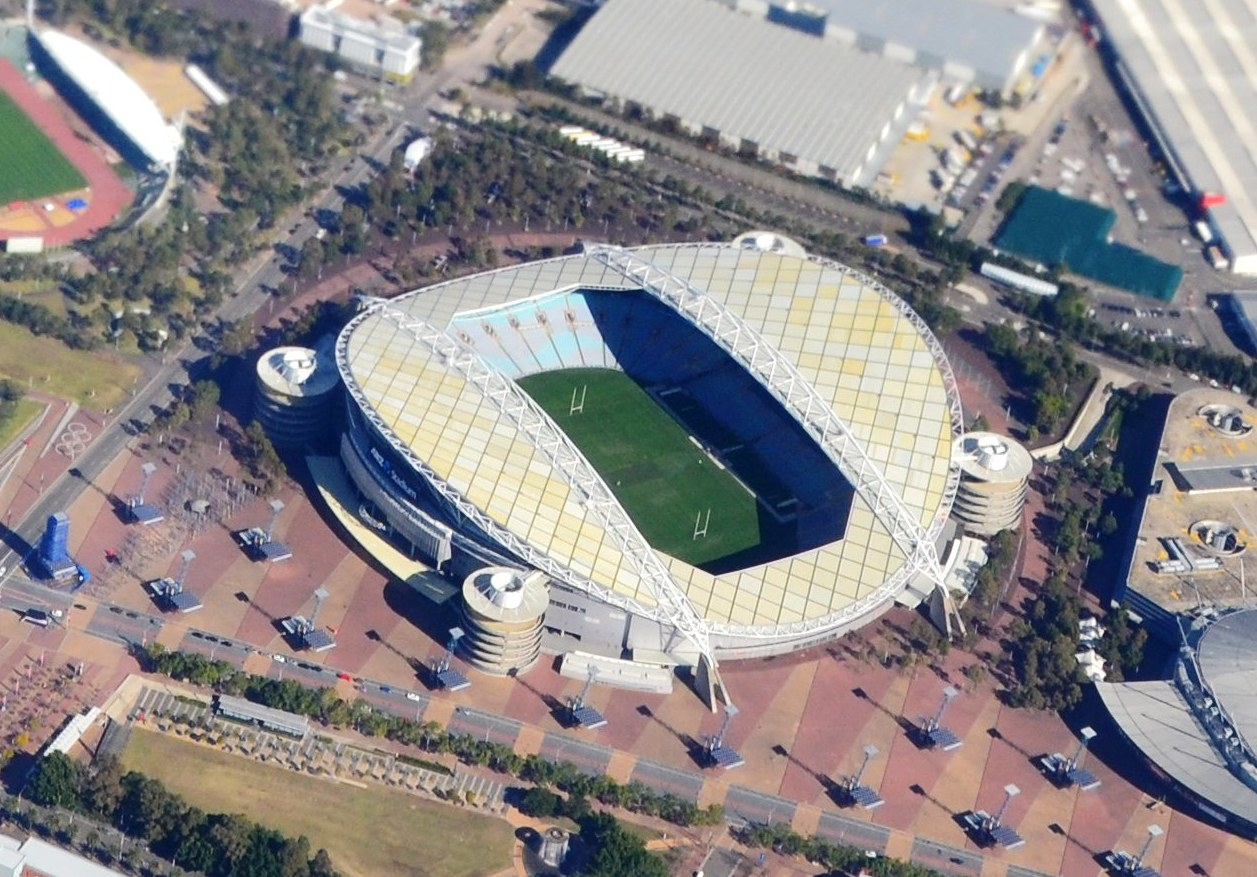
ANZ Stadium, where the match was played

=== Melbourne Storm ===
The Melbourne Storm finished the regular season in 4th position with 14 wins, nine losses and one draw. As the minor premiers of the last three seasons and premiers in 2007, some commentators believed that the Melbourne side were below their best in 2009 and doubted they would make a fourth straight grand final. But in the first week of the finals series they easily accounted for the defending premiers, the Manly-Warringah Sea Eagles, with a 40–12 victory. They then defeated the 2006 premiers, the Brisbane Broncos, 40–10 to qualify for the grand final. Melbourne were the first side to make four consecutive grand finals since Parramatta did so from 1981 to 1984.

Melbourne five-eighth Brett Finch had a chance to break his premiership drought by defeating the side that terminated his contract in April 2009 when coach Daniel Anderson said he was not wanted at the Parramatta club.

=== Parramatta Eels ===
After a dreadful first half of the season and languishing in 14th position, the Parramatta Eels won 9 of their last 12 games to finish 8th and just make the finals. In the first three weeks of the finals series they defeated the top three teams of the home and away season – minor premiers the St. George Illawarra Dragons, the Gold Coast Titans, and arch-rivals the Canterbury-Bankstown Bulldogs. The last time the Parramatta club made the grand final was 2001 where they were defeated by the Newcastle Knights and the last time they won the premiership was in 1986. They were the first team to come from 8th position to make the NRL Grand Final and if they had won they would have been the first team ever ranked below 6th to win the premiership. Canterbury's appearance in the 1998 grand final came from 9th position, but under a different finals system.

The two sides faced each other once in the regular season in round 19. Parramatta won 18–16 at Parramatta Stadium on 20 July.

== Schedule ==
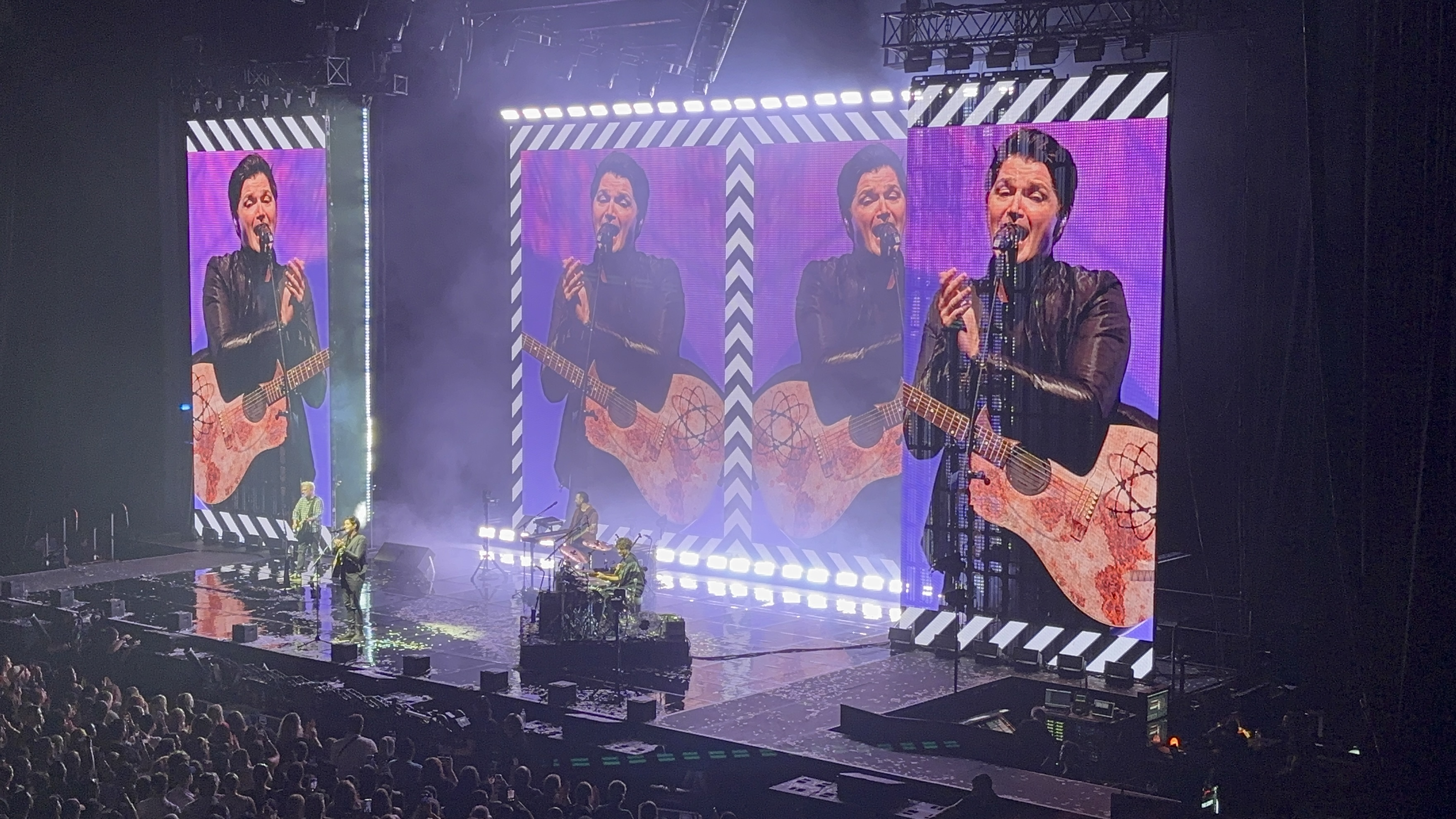
The Script (pictured in 2025) performed during the half-time entertainment.

The 2009 NRL Grand Final featured pre-match entertainment by the Grammy award-winning Australian rock band Wolfmother while Irish band The Script performed their latest hit Before the Worst at halftime. 2008 Australian Idol winner Wes Carr performed a tribute to the elite club of players who have played 300 Premiership games, while the game's retiring players were farewelled. Prior to kick-off the Child Flight helicopter and members of the game's "300 Club" delivered the Telstra Premiership Trophy to ANZ Stadium.

- 11:45 am Gates Open
- 12:10 pm NSWRL Cup Grand Final Kick Off
- 2:10 pm Toyota Cup Grand Final Kick Off
- 4:10 pm World boxing champions Danny Green and Roy Jones Jr. presented to crowd
- 4:40 pm Telstra Child Flight chopper arrives with Telstra Premiership Trophy
- 4:45 pm 300 Club and Retiring Players tribute with Wes Carr Performance
- 4:50 pm Wolfmother performance
- 5:10 pm Australian National Anthem performed by Mark Vincent
- 5:15 pm Kick-off
- 6:05 pm The Script halftime performance
- 6:55 pm Trophy presentation to Melbourne Storm

== Teams ==
Parramatta Eels fullback and Dally M Medallist Jarryd Hayne was in danger of missing the match after being placed on report during the preliminary final for sliding in with his knees out to stop a try and connecting with the head of Canterbury winger Bryson Goodwin. The incident was reviewed by the NRL Match Review Panel on 27 September and Hayne received a grade one sentence, allowing him to play. This enabled Hayne to take his place in the Parramatta team opposite current Melbourne and Australian fullback and 2008 Golden Boot Winner Billy Slater.

Parramatta captain Nathan Cayless was under an injury cloud after he strained his hamstring in the preliminary final. He passed an intense fitness test on the day before the game to take his place in the grand final. Cayless, Luke Burt and Nathan Hindmarsh went into the match as the only remaining survivors from the club's 2001 Grand Final loss to the Newcastle Knights.

Team details
Melbourne Storm		Position	Parramatta Eels
Name	Number	Position	Number	Name
Billy Slater	1	Fullback	1	Jarryd Hayne
Steve Turner	2	Wing	2	Luke Burt
Will Chambers	3	Centre	3	Krisnan Inu
Greg Inglis	4	Centre	4	Joel Reddy
Dane Nielsen	5	Wing	5	Eric Grothe
Brett Finch	6	Five eighth	6	Daniel Mortimer
Cooper Cronk	7	Half back	7	Jeff Robson
Aiden Tolman	8	Prop forward	8	Nathan Cayless (c)
Cameron Smith (c)	9	Hooker	9	Matthew Keating
Brett White	10	Prop forward	10	Fuifui Moimoi
Adam Blair	11	Second row	11	Nathan Hindmarsh
Ryan Hoffman	12	Second row	12	Ben Smith
Dallas Johnson	13	Lock forward	13	Todd Lowrie
Ryan Hinchcliffe	14	Interchange	14	Kevin Kingston
Jeff Lima	15	Interchange	15	Feleti Mateo
Ryan Tandy	16	Interchange	16	Joe Galuvao
Scott Anderson	17	Interchange	17	Tim Mannah
Craig Bellamy		Coach		Daniel Anderson
RLP

== Match details ==
1st Half

Melbourne's Ryan Hoffman broke Parramatta's line to score the first try of the game in the fifth minute to make the score 6–0. Parramatta was looking shaky in the first half, and Melbourne capitalised with a try to Adam Blair in the 24th minute, set up by a Cooper Cronk line-break, to make the score 10–0, which would be the half-time score.

2nd Half

Parramatta scored early in the second half, with Eric Grothe, Jr., scoring in the 45th minute to bring the scoreline to 10–6. Melbourne responded quickly, with tries to Greg Inglis off a bomb kick in the 49th minute and Billy Slater from a line break in the 56th minute, to open a handy 22–6 lead heading into the final quarter of the game. Parramatta attacked through the final quarter of the game, then broke through for two tries: one to Joel Reddy off a bomb kick in the 70th minute, then a barnstorming run from Fuifui Moimoi off an off-load in the 72nd minute; only the former of these tries was converted, bringing the score to 22–16. In the 76th minute, with Melbourne attacking from their own half, Billy Slater dropped the ball as he tried to play it. Referee Tony Archer signaled a penalty for Melbourne. It was initially thought that Archer had penalised Fuifui Moimoi for stripping the ball from Slater in the tackle, even though both of Moimoi's arms were still wrapped around Slater's legs, but it was later revealed he had penalised Moimoi for holding on to Slater, not for a strip. Greg Inglis scored a field goal in the ensuing set-of-six, extending the margin to 23–16 in the 79th minute. Melbourne would hold on to win by that score.

Clive Churchill Medal

Melbourne fullback Billy Slater was judged by Australian selectors Bob McCarthy, Bob Fulton, Les Geeves and Des Morris to be awarded the Clive Churchill Medal for man of the match. Slater became the first fullback since Bronco Darren Lockyer in the 2000 NRL Grand Final to win the prestigious award. Slater became the third Storm player to win the Churchill Medal, after Brett Kimmorley (1999) and Greg Inglis (2007).

Some commentators felt that Slater did not deserve the award, suggesting other Melbourne teammates such as halfback Cooper Cronk, citing Cronk's stats which included two try assists to Slater's one, 24 tackles and 16 kicks for 529 metres, dwarfing the combined 387 metres booted by the Eels' Jarryd Hayne (226) and Jeff Robson (161). Upon receiving his award, Slater even mentioned "I feel like I don't deserve to wear it... Cooper Cronk deserved it." Despite the criticism, selectors stood by their decision.

== Scoreboard ==
2009 NRL Grand Final

Sunday, 4 October
17:15 AEDT (UTC+11)

Melbourne Storm	23 – 16	Parramatta Eels
Tries: 4 Hoffman 5'; Blair 24'; Inglis 49'; Slater 55'; Goals: 3 Smith 7', 50', 57' (3/4); Field goals: 1 Inglis 77'	1st: 10–0; 2nd: 13–16	Tries: 3 Grothe 45'; Reddy 70'; Moimoi 72'; Goals: 2 Burt 46', 70' (2/3)

ANZ Stadium, Sydney
Attendance: 82,538
Referees: Tony Archer, Shayne Hayne
Touch judges: Paul Holland, David Abood
Clive Churchill Medal: Billy Slater (Melbourne)

== Audience ==
The NRL Grand Final is one of the most popular sporting events of Australasia, and the 2009 NRL grand final was played before a sold-out crowd of 82,538 – the largest rugby league crowd at ANZ Stadium in its current configuration – with millions more watching around Australia and the rest of the world.

=== Telecast details ===
- Australia – Nine Network (live from 5 pm AEST with coverage beginning at noon). A replay of the game will be played on Fox Sports at 8 pm AEST on the same night.
- New Zealand – Sky Sports (live from 6:30 pm NZ time)
- Asia-Pacific – Australia Network (includes China, Hong Kong/Macau, Taiwan, Japan, South Korea, North Korea, Vietnam, Indonesia, Singapore, Thailand, Philippines, Palau, Malaysia, Cambodia, Burma/Myanmar, Laos, Brunei, Fiji, Western Samoa, Tonga, Cook Islands, Tuvalu, East Timor, Vanuatu, New Caledonia, Solomon Islands, Marshall Islands, Nauru, Micronesia, Kiribati)
- Indian subcontinent – Australia Network (includes India, Pakistan, Sri Lanka, Bangladesh, Nepal, Bhutan)
- Middle East – Australia Network and ShowSports
- United States and Canada – Spike TV (from 11 am ET/PT)(also shown throughout all the countries in The Americas region.)
- Ireland and the United Kingdom – ESPN UK (live from 7 am)

=== Nine Network criticism ===
The Nine Network was criticised on talkback radio, internet blogs, news sites and the Herald Sun newspaper for not broadcasting the post match celebrations, such as the trophy and medal presentations outside of NSW and QLD, the outrage most evident in Melbourne due to Melbourne Storm winning the game, and also due to the large number of Melbourne supporters at the Melbourne Storm function who could not make the trip to Sydney. One point made by viewers was that the post match was broadcast to international viewers but not those in Australian capital cities such as Melbourne or Adelaide.
