= NRL Judiciary =

Judiciary of the Australian National Rugby League

The NRL Judiciary is the disciplinary judiciary of the National Rugby League (NRL), a rugby league competition. The Judiciary regulates the on-field conduct of players from NRL clubs.

Due to changes announced on the eve of the 2022 NRL season, the NRL Judiciary is made up of former players who convene in two-man panels to rule on on-field incidents. The judiciary has been chaired by Supreme Court of NSW Justice Geoffrey Bellew since 2015. Bellew has the deciding vote should the panel's verdict not be unanimous.

From 2022, the Match Review Committee deciding on whether charges are issued against players for on-field conduct is managed by former NRL player and video referee Luke Patten.

An integrity unit was formed on 7 February 2013 and is headed by former Federal Court judge Tony Whitlam.

== Penalties Table ==
Updated for 2022 NRL season.

| Offence | Grade | 1st Offence (Early plea in brackets) | 2nd Offence (Early plea in brackets) | 3rd Offence (Early plea in brackets) |
|---|---|---|---|---|
| High Tackle - Careless | 1 | $1,500 ($1,000) | $2,500 ($1,800) | 2 matches ($3,000) |
| High Tackle - Careless | 2 | 2 matches (1) | 3 matches (2) | 4 matches (3) |
| High Tackle - Careless | 3 | 3 matches (2) | 4 matches (3) | 5 matches (4) |
| High Tackle - Reckless | 4(1) (Note: High Tackle Reckless is effectively treated as a grade up from High Tackle Careless) | 4 matches (3) | 5 matches (4) | 6 matches (5) |
| High Tackle - Reckless | 5(2) | 5 matches (4) | 6 matches (5) | 7 matches (6) |
| High Tackle - Reckless | 6(3) | 6 matches (5) | 7 matches (6) | 8 matches (7) |
| Dangerous Contact | 1 | $1,500 ($1,000) | $2,500 ($1,800) | 2 matches ($3,000) |
| Dangerous Contact | 2 | 2 matches (1) | 3 matches (2) | 4 matches (3) |
| Dangerous Contact | 3 | 3 matches (2) | 4 matches (3) | 5 matches (4) |
| Dangerous Throw | 1 | $1,500 ($1,000) | $2,500 ($1,800) | 3 matches (2) |
| Dangerous Throw | 2 | 3 matches (2) | 4 matches (3) | 5 matches (4) |
| Dangerous Throw | 3 | 5 matches (4) | 6 matches (5) | 7 matches (6) |
| Striking | 1 | $2,000 ($1,500) | 2 matches ($3,000) | 4 matches (3) |
| Striking | 2 | 3 matches (2) | 4 matches (3) | 5 matches (4) |
| Striking | 3 | 4 matches (3) | 5 matches (4) | 6 matches (5) |
| Crusher Tackle | 1 | $2,000 ($1,500) | 2 matches ($3,000) | 4 matches (3) |
| Crusher Tackle | 2 | 3 matches (2) | 4 matches (3) | 5 matches (4) |
| Crusher Tackle | 3 | 4 matches (3) | 5 matches (4) | 6 matches (5) |
| Contrary Conduct | 1 | $1,500 ($1,000) | $2,500 ($1,800) | 2 matches ($3,000) |
| Contrary Conduct | 2 | 2 matches (1) | 3 matches (2) | 4 matches (3) |
| Contrary Conduct | 3 | 3 matches (2) | 4 matches (3) | 5 matches (4) |
| Shoulder Charge | 1 | $2,000 ($1,500) | 2 matches ($3,000) | 4 matches (3) |
| Shoulder Charge | 2 | 3 matches (2) | 4 matches (3) | 5 matches (4) |
| Shoulder Charge | 3 | 4 matches (3) | 5 matches (4) | 6 matches (5) |

== Personnel ==
NRL Judiciary

- Chair: Geoff Bellew
- Panel members: Bob Lindner, Tony Puletua, Henry Perenara, Sean Hampstead, Greg McCullum, Paul Simpkins
- Judiciary counsel: Lachlan Gyles, Patrick Knowles

Match Review Committee

- Manager: Luke Patten
- Members: Michael Hodgson, Anthony Quinn, Steve Clark, Stuart Raper

== History ==
The NRL Judiciary was formed in 1998 after the reunification of the game in Australia, following the Super League war. Judiciary hearings were generally held on Tuesday nights, following the completion of each round of matches. Charges would be laid against players by the NRL Match Review Committee (MRC), originally chaired from 1998–2003 by judiciary commissioner Jim Hall. Hall was originally appointed by Super League to be that competition's judiciary commissioner, and was joined by Graham Annesley and Ron Massey to form the MRC.

The MRC would review incidents where players were either sent off or reported by the referee; subject to a complaint by an opposition club, or another source; or observed by the MRC. If a charge was warranted, the MRC would grade the serious of the offence and players and clubs would have the opportunity to take an early guilty plea to avoid a hearing. If the player chose the defend the charge, the hearing would be held by the NRL Judiciary under chairman Greg Woods and a panel of former players.

The hearing would be similar to a jury trial where the chairman provides rulings and direction to the panel members, and after hearing the evidence the panel members would deliberate. If found guilty the table of demerit point penalties would determine the number of matches players would be suspended after the verdict.

Jim Hall would be sacked as judiciary commissioner in January 2004 by then NRL CEO David Gallop, with the league splitting the role after a number of controversies during the 2003 NRL season.

=== Suspensions ===
==== NRL records ====
| Player | Charges | Season | Matches suspended | Club |
|---|---|---|---|---|
| Danny Williams | Striking | 2004 | 18 | Melbourne Storm |
| John Hopoate | Striking | 2005 | 17 | Manly Warringah Sea Eagles |
| James Graham | Biting | 2012 | 12 | Canterbury-Bankstown Bulldogs |
| Clint Newton | Striking | 2004 | 12 | Newcastle Knights |
| John Hopoate | 3 × Contrary conduct | 2001 | 12 | Wests Tigers |
| Josh Stuart | 2 × high tackles | 1998 | 12 | North Sydney Bears |
| Luke O'Donnell | Reckless high tackle | 2003 | 11 | Wests Tigers |
| Lopini Paea | Dangerous Throw | 2006 | 10 | Sydney Roosters |
| Luke MacDougall | Dangerous Throw | 2005 | 10 | South Sydney Rabbitohs |
| Tim Maddison | Striking | 2002 | 10 | North Queensland Cowboys |
| Greg Bird | Dangerous contact - head/neck | 2004 | 10 | Cronulla-Sutherland Sharks |

=== Previous points table ===
System in place from 1998-2021, this version from 2017-2021.
100 points = 1 match suspension

| Offence | Grade 1 | Grade 2 | Grade 3 |
|---|---|---|---|
| Tripping | $1,500 or 100 | 200 | 300 |
| Kicking | 200 | 300 | 400 |
| Striking | 200 | 300 | 400 |
| Reckless high tackle | 400 | 500 | 600 |
| Intentional high tackle | Refer to panel | | |
| Careless high tackle | $1,500 or 100 | 200 | 300 |
| Dropping Knees | 200 | 300 | 400 |
| Dangerous Throw | $1,500 or 100 | 300 | 500 |
| Contrary conduct | $1,500 or 100 | 200 | 300 |
| Detrimental conduct | $1,500 or 100 | 200 | 300 |
| Dangerous contact - head/neck | 100 | 300 | 500 |
| Dangerous contact - other | 100 | 200 | 300 |
| Shoulder charge | 200 | 350 | 500 |
| Crusher tackle | 200 | 350 | 500 |

== See also ==
- AFL Tribunal
- List of players sent off in National Rugby League matches
