= Gavin Badger =

Australian former rugby league referee

Personal information
- Born: 1972 (age 53–54) Redfern, New South Wales, Australia

Refereeing information
Years	Competition	Apps
2003–20	NRL	306
2009–14	City vs Country Origin	2
2006	Internationals

Gavin Badger is an Australian former rugby league referee in the National Rugby League. He controlled over 300 NRL matches.

== Refereeing career ==
Badger grew up in Redfern, New South Wales and is the only NRL full-time referee with an indigenous background.

He made his NRL debut as a referee during a Brisbane vs South Sydney game at Suncorp Stadium in round 17 of 2004. In 2006 he controlled his first international match, a World Cup qualification match between Fiji and Tonga. Badger has also controlled City vs Country Origin matches in 2009 and 2014 and the 2010 and 2011 All Stars matches.

His wife, Kasey Badger, is also a rugby league referee. On 21 October 2012, the day of their second wedding anniversary, they jointly refereed an international match between Thailand and the Philippines.

On 6 August 2017, Badger became the fifth referee to control 300 first grade matches in Australia, following Bill Harrigan, Col Pearce, Shayne Hayne and Steve Clark.
