= 2011 All Stars match =

Australian rugby league match

Coordinates: 28°4′1″S 153°22′44″E

2011 All Stars Game
Indigenous All Stars	NRL All Stars
12	28
	1	2	3	4	Total
INDIGENOUS	0	6	6	0	12
NRL	4	18	0	6	28
- Date: 12 February 2011
- Stadium: Skilled Park
- Location: Gold Coast, Queensland
- Preston Campbell Medal: Josh Dugan
- Referees: Shayne Hayne, Ben Cummins, Gavin Badger, Henry Perenara
- Attendance: 25,843

Broadcast partners
- Broadcasters: Nine Network

The 2011 All Stars Match was the second of the annual representative exhibition match played between the Indigenous All Stars and the NRL All Stars which was held on the 12 of February 2011 at the Gold Coast's Skilled Park in Queensland, Australia. The game was won by the NRL All Stars 28–12, claiming their first annual title. Canberra Raiders fullback Josh Dugan won the Preston Campbell medal for Man of the Match. Preceding game included a Women's All Stars exhibition match which was won by the NRL Women's All Stars 22–6.

== Teams ==
NRL ALL STARS	Position	INDIGENOUS ALL STARS
Josh Dugan	Fullback	Matt Bowen
Akuila Uate	Wing	Nathan Merritt
Michael Jennings	Centre	Willie Tonga
Jamie Lyon	Centre	Beau Champion^{1}
Brett Morris	Wing	Jharal Yow Yeh
Darren Lockyer (c)	Five-Eighth	Scott Prince
Benji Marshall	Halfback	Johnathan Thurston (c)
Ben Hannant	Prop	Tom Learoyd-Lahrs
Cameron Smith	Hooker	Travis Waddell
Matt Scott	Prop	George Rose
Nathan Hindmarsh	2nd Row	Cory Paterson
Ashley Harrison	2nd Row	Jamal Idris
Paul Gallen	Lock	Greg Bird
Dave Taylor	Interchange	Ben Barba
Liam Fulton^{3}	Interchange	Jamie Soward
Feleti Mateo	Interchange	Carl Webb
Shaun Kenny-Dowall	Interchange	Joel Moon^{2}
Michael Ennis	Interchange	Joel Thompson
Petero Civoniceva	Interchange	Ryan James
Kurt Gidley	Interchange	Anthony Mitchell^{4}
Wayne Bennett	Coach	Laurie Daley

^{1} - Greg Inglis was originally selected but withdrew due to injury. He was replaced by Beau Champion.
^{2} - Sam Thaiday was originally selected but withdrew due to injury. He was replaced by Cory Paterson whilst Joel Moon joined the interchange.
^{3} - Gareth Ellis was originally selected but withdrew due to injury. He was replaced by Liam Fulton.
^{4} - Preston Campbell was originally selected but withdrew due to injury. He was replaced by Matt Bowen whilst Anthony Mitchell joined the interchange. Johnathan Thurston was handed the captaincy title from Campbell.

== Result ==
12 February 2011
8:00pm (AEST)

NRL All Stars	28 – 12	Indigenous All Stars
Tries: Brett Morris (3') 1 Paul Gallen (24') 1 Shaun Kenny-Dowall (32') 1 Akuila Uate (35') 1 Josh Dugan (72') 1 Goals: Benji Marshall 2/2 (33', 36'); Cameron Smith 1/2 (25'); Kurt Gidley 1/1 (73')	1st: 4 - 0; 2nd: 18 - 6; 3rd: 0 - 6; 4th: 6 - 0	Tries: Ben Barba (40') 1 Nathan Merritt (59') 1 Goals: Johnathan Thurston 1/1 (40'); Scott Prince 1/1 (60')

Skilled Park
Gold Coast, Queensland
Attendance: 25,843
Preston Campbell Medal: Josh Dugan
Referee: Shayne Hayne, Ben Cummins, Gavin Badger, Henry Perenara

== Women's All Stars match ==
2011 Women's All Stars match
Indigenous Women All Stars	Women All Stars
6	20
	1	Total
IND	0	6
WAS	0	20
- Date: Saturday 12 February 2011
- Stadium: Skilled Park
- Location: Gold Coast, Queensland
- Woman of the Match: TBA
- Advance Australia Fair: TBA

Broadcast partners

The 2011 Women's All Stars Match was the first time the event was held. The game, played in twenty minute halves, was won by the All Stars team, by 20 points to six.

=== Women's Teams ===
Squads for the two teams were selected and announced in December for the match in February.

Women's Indigenous All Stars: Bianca Ambrum, Theresa Anderson, Naomi Babongi, Natasha Baggow, Pat Fraser, Natalie Gala, Kaitlin Moss, Yvonne O'Neill, Angela Solomon, Rebecca Solomon, Tracy Thompson (Qld), Bo De La Cruz (NT), Chloe Caldwell, Candice Clay, Eunice Grimes, Mahalia Murphy, Kylie Pennell, Lavina Philip, Rachel Moreton, Ros Simpson, Tyan Smith, Julie Young, Rebecca Young.

Women's All Stars: Heather Ballinger, Jo Barrett, Ali Brigginshaw, Natalie Dwyer, Erin Elliott, Steph Hancock, Suzanne Johnson, Renae Kunst, Karyn Murphy, Tahnee Norris, Tegan Rolfe, Tarah Westera (Qld), Teina Clark, Lisa Fiola, Kylie Hilder, Sonia Mose, Jess Palmer, Alexander Sulshi (NSW).
