= Shayne Hayne =

Australian former rugby league referee (born 1967)

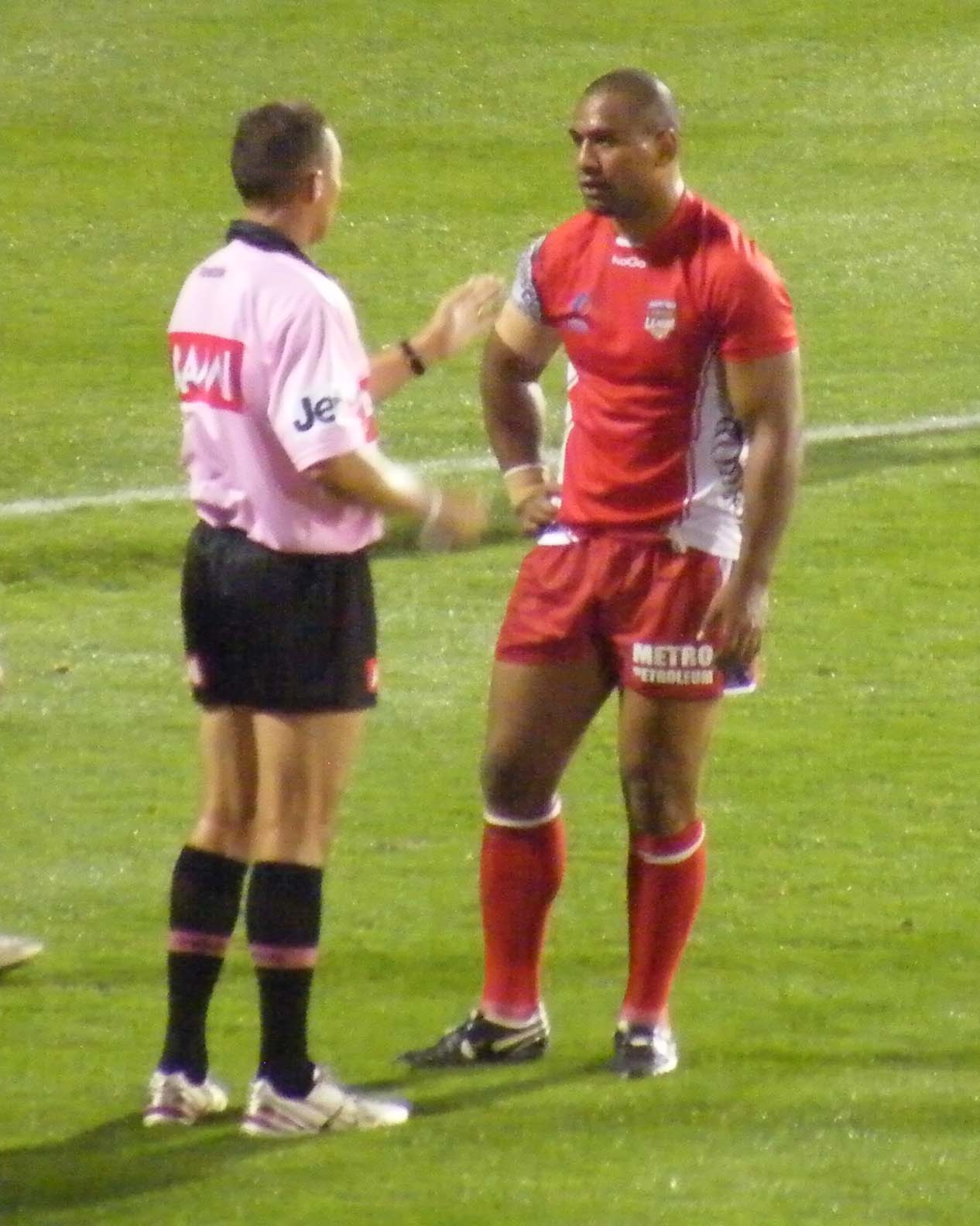
- Hayne (left) refereeing a World-Cup match.

Personal information
- Full name: Kevin John Hayne
- Born: 31 October 1967 (age 59)
- Height: 1.80 m (5 ft 11 in)

Refereeing information
| Years | Competition | Apps |
| 2001–14 | National Rugby League | 356 |
| 2007–09 | City vs Country Origin | 2 |
| 2007–14 | State of Origin | 14 |
| 2008–14 | Rugby League World Cup | 9 |
| 2010–11 | All Stars Match | 2 |

Kevin John "Shayne" Hayne (born 31 October 1967) is an Australian former rugby league referee. He officiated in the National Rugby League, City vs Country Origin, State of Origin series, All Stars Matches, the 2008 World Cup and the 2009, 2010, 2013 and 2014 NRL Grand Finals.

== Early career ==
Hayne spent most of his early life in Muswellbrook, his family having moved there in 1968. He went to South Muswellbrook Primary School, then Muswellbrook High School.

As a child, Hayne played rugby union and rugby league, before making a career in the latter sport.

He played for the Muswellbrook Rams in the Group 21 competition, up until his retirement in 1994, after losing the grand final for a third time running.

Hayne obtained his state-school refereeing badge at the age of 16, and his senior badge at the age of 18. He soon became one of the top referees in the Group 21 competition. In 2000, Hayne joined the NRL's referee recruitment program, travelling 526 kilometres for training once a week until he re-located to the Central Coast.

== First grade career ==
Shayne had shown promise as a Country Rugby League referee, and he furthered his career by travelling from Muswellbrook to Sydney multiple times a week. Hayne made his National Rugby League début on 10 March 2001 at ANZ Stadium in a match between the Brisbane Broncos and Wests Tigers.

In August 2003, Hayne became the source of some controversy when he appeared to lose control of a game between the Parramatta Eels and Cronulla Sharks. This resulted in a 70 point victory due to the Sharks being reduced to 10 men at one part of the game.

He became one of the main referees in the game, including refereeing the 2007 City v Country game at Coffs Harbour, and then, as a surprise pick ahead of Paul Simpkins, Game II of the 2007 State of Origin series. Simpkins was picked to referee the following Origin game. Hayne, along with Tony Archer, refereed the NRL Grand Final in 2009. This was the first grand final to feature two referees. In 2011, Hayne was overlooked for the 2011 Grand Final, withe NRL going with Matt Cecchin and Tony Archer, despite being referee of the year.

He announced his retirement on 12 November 2014. His final game was the 2014 NRL Grand Final between South Sydney Rabbitohs and the Canterbury Bulldogs, in a game that no doubt was a great way to finish off his career, given his fondness supporting one of these teams (as a youngster, growing up in Muswellbrook NSW). At his retirement, Hayne had controlled 328 regular season matches, placing him third behind Bill Harrigan and Col Pearce. He had also controlled 14 State of Origin games, placing him second behind Bill Harrigan. Hayne also controlled two City vs Country Origin and two All Stars Matches.

In 2015, he was the coach of the NRL Referee's Emerging Squad.

== International ==
In 2005 he controlled a match between the Australian Prime Minister’s XIII and Papua New Guinea.

Hayne refereed six World Cup matches, in the 2008 and 2013 tournaments. He controlled one match in the 2009 Four Nations, the 2009 European Cup final and the 2014 ANZAC Test match.

== Honours ==
Hayne won the Col Pearce Medal three times, in 2009, 2011 and 2013. He was named 2009's referee of the year by the Rugby League International Federation.
