= Tony Archer (referee) =

Australian rugby league referee

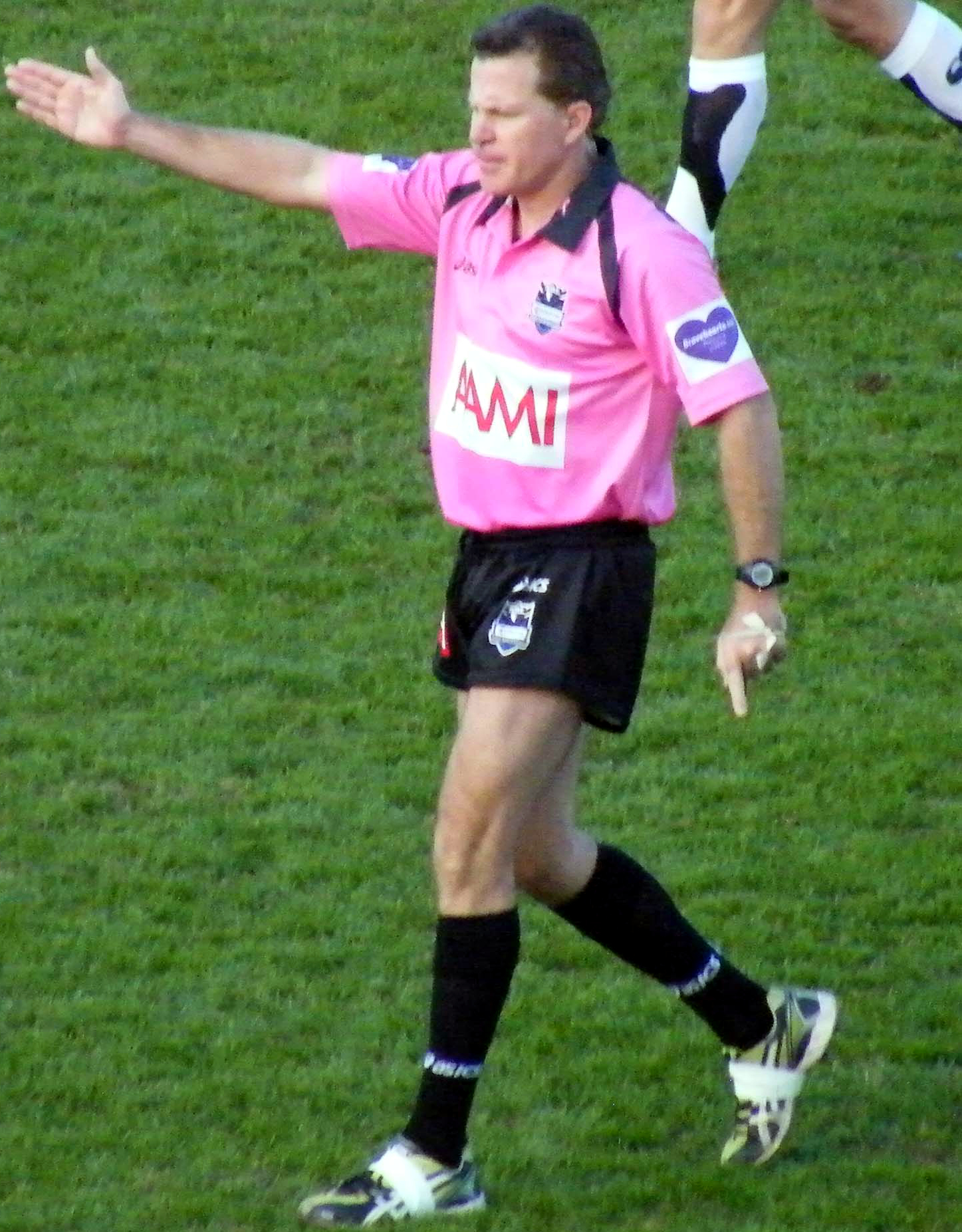

Personal information
- Full name: Anthony Archer
- Born: 1969 (age 56–57) Australia

Refereeing information
Years	Competition	Apps
1999–12	NRL	319
2006	City vs Country Origin	1
2006–10	International	9
2008–12	State of Origin	13

Tony Archer is an Australian former rugby league referee. He presided over 319 National Rugby League games as referee between 1999 and 2012 as well as being the referee of 13 State of Origin matches and 9 International matches, including at the 2008 World Cup. He was the former National Rugby League referee's elite performance manager.

== Rugby league career ==
Archer made his first grade debut controlling a Western Suburbs Magpies v Canterbury Bulldogs match at Campbelltown on 24 July 1999.

Since then he has refereed the NRL Grand Final in 2007 2009 & 2010, at the 2008 World Cup, 2010 Four Nations and also controlled the 2010 All Stars match.

Archer was named international referee of the year in 2007 and 2008. On 3 November 2011 The annual RLIF Awards dinner was held at the Tower of London and Archer was named referee of the year.

He retired at the end of the 2012 NRL season to take up a coaching role. In late 2013 he was appointed the interim referee's elite performance manager by the National Rugby League. Before the 2014 season, the National Rugby League appointed him to the full-time role.

== Personal life ==
His part-time job was as a Police prosecutor with the New South Wales Police Force.
