= RLIF Awards =

Annual major international sporting award for rugby league

The RLIF Awards are the Rugby League International Federation's annual major international sporting award for rugby league. Since 2004 the awards ceremony recognises the best referee, coach, developing nations player, international newcomer, captain and a team of the year.

In 2007, the RLIF did not organise any awards. To fill the gap, Rugby League World magazine asked its Golden Boot panel to come up with winners in the existing categories used by the RLIF.

Coinciding with the 2008 Rugby League World Cup, the RLIF Awards were rebranded and the old award system was replaced.

== Player of the Year ==
Described as rugby league's most prestigious individual honour, the International Player of the Year award is given to the world’s best player as voted upon by an international judging panel comprising journalists, broadcasters and former international players drawn from both the northern and southern hemispheres.

Year	Player	Club	National team	Ref
2008	Billy Slater	Melbourne Storm	Australia	
2009	Jarryd Hayne	Parramatta Eels	Australia	
2010	Todd Carney	Sydney Roosters	Australia	
2011	Billy Slater	Melbourne Storm	Australia	
2012	Cameron Smith	Melbourne Storm	Australia	
2013	Sonny Bill Williams	Sydney Roosters	New Zealand	
2014	Sam Burgess	South Sydney Rabbitohs	England	

== Coach of the Year ==
Year	Name	Club	Representative team	Ref
2004	Brian Noble	Bradford Bulls	Great Britain	
2005	Wayne Bennett	Brisbane Broncos	Australia	
2006	Brian McClennan		New Zealand	
2007	Tony Smith	Leeds Rhinos	Great Britain	
2008	Des Hasler	Manly-Warringah Sea Eagles		
2009	Craig Bellamy	Melbourne Storm	New South Wales Blues	
2010	Wayne Bennett	St. George Illawarra Dragons		
2011	Des Hasler	Manly-Warringah Sea Eagles		
2012	Craig Bellamy	Melbourne Storm		
2013	Trent Robinson	Sydney Roosters		
2014	Michael Maguire	South Sydney Rabbitohs		

== Rookie of the Year ==
Year	Player	Club	National team	Ref
2008	Israel Folau	Melbourne Storm	Australia	
2009	Ryan Hall	Leeds Rhinos	England	
2010	Sam Tomkins	Wigan Warriors	England	
2011	Jharal Yow Yeh	Brisbane Broncos	Australia	
2012	Shaun Johnson	New Zealand Warriors	New Zealand	
2013	George Burgess	South Sydney Rabbitohs	England	

== Referee of the Year ==
Year	Name	Competition	Major appointments	Ref
2004	Russell Smith	Super League, Challenge Cup	Tri-Nations	
2005	Tim Mander	National Rugby League	State of Origin, NRL Grand Final, European Nations Cup, Tri-Nations	
2006	Ashley Klein	Super League, Challenge Cup	Anzac Test, Tri-Nations	
2007	Tony Archer	National Rugby League	NRL Grand Final, All Golds Tour	
2008	Tony Archer	National Rugby League	State of Origin, NRL Grand Final, World Cup	
2009	Shayne Hayne	National Rugby League	City vs Country Origin, State of Origin, NRL Grand Final, European Cup, Four Nations	
2010	Tony Archer	National Rugby League	State of Origin, NRL Grand Final, Four Nations	
2010	Richard Silverwood	Super League, Challenge Cup	World Club Challenge, Anzac Test, Challenge Cup Grand Final, Super League Grand Final, Four Nations	
2011	Tony Archer	National Rugby League	State of Origin, NRL Grand Final	
2012	Ben Cummins	National Rugby League	State of Origin, NRL Grand Final, Australia vs New Zealand Test match	
2013	Ben Cummins	National Rugby League	State of Origin, NRL Grand Final, World Cup	

== Spirit of Rugby League Award ==
Year	Recipient	Ref
2008	Paul Barriere	
2009	Ken Arthurson	
2010	Ron McGregor	
2011	David Oxley CBE	
2013	Maurice Oldroyd	
2014	Peter Corcoran	

== Team of the Year ==
2008
Position	Player	Club	National team
Fullback	Billy Slater	Melbourne Storm	Australia
Wing	Manu Vatuvei	New Zealand Warriors	New Zealand
Centre	Israel Folau	Melbourne Storm	Australia
Five-eighth/Stand-off	Greg Inglis	Melbourne Storm	Australia
Halfback/Scrum-half	Scott Prince	Gold Coast Titans	Australia
Prop	James Graham	St. Helens	England
Hooker	Cameron Smith	Melbourne Storm	Australia
Second-row	Gareth Ellis	Leeds Rhinos	England
Second-row	Anthony Laffranchi	Gold Coast Titans	Australia
Lock/Loose forward	Paul Gallen	Cronulla-Sutherland Sharks	Australia

2009
Position	Player	Club	National team
Fullback	Jarryd Hayne	Parramatta Eels	Australia
Wing	Ryan Hall	Leeds Rhinos	England
Centre	Greg Inglis	Melbourne Storm	Australia
Five-eighth/Stand-off	Benji Marshall	Wests Tigers	New Zealand
Halfback/Scrum-half	Johnathan Thurston	North Queensland Cowboys	Australia
Prop	Fuifui Moimoi	Parramatta Eels	New Zealand
Hooker	Cameron Smith	Melbourne Storm	Australia
Second-row	Gareth Ellis	Wests Tigers	England
Lock/Loose forward	Kevin Sinfield	Leeds Rhinos	England

2010
Position	Player	Club	National team
Fullback	Darius Boyd	St. George Illawarra Dragons	Australia
Wing	Pat Richards	Wigan Warriors	
Centre	Shaun Kenny-Dowall	Sydney Roosters	New Zealand
Five-eighth/Stand-off	Todd Carney	Sydney Roosters	Australia
Halfback/Scrum-half	Scott Prince	Gold Coast Titans	
Prop	Adrian Morley	Warrington Wolves	England
Hooker	Robbie Farah	Wests Tigers	Australia
Second-row	Gareth Ellis	Wests Tigers	England
Lock/Loose forward	Luke Lewis	Penrith Panthers	Australia

2011
Position	Player	Club	National team
Fullback	Billy Slater	Melbourne Storm	Australia
Wing	Akuila Uate	Newcastle Knights	Australia
Centre	Jamie Lyon	Manly-Warringah Sea Eagles	
Five-eighth/Stand-off	Benji Marshall	Wests Tigers	New Zealand
Halfback/Scrum-half	Daly Cherry-Evans	Manly-Warringah Sea Eagles	Australia
Prop	Matthew Scott	North Queensland Cowboys	Australia
Hooker	Cameron Smith	Melbourne Storm	Australia
Second-row	Sam Thaiday	Brisbane Broncos	Australia
Lock/Loose forward	Paul Gallen	Cronulla-Sutherland Sharks	Australia

2012
Position	Player	Club	National team
Fullback	Ben Barba	Canterbury-Bankstown Bulldogs	
Wing	Ryan Hall	Leeds Rhinos	England
Centre	Jamie Lyon	Manly-Warringah Sea Eagles	
Five-eighth/Stand-off	Johnathan Thurston	North Queensland Cowboys	Australia
Halfback/Scrum-half	Cooper Cronk	Melbourne Storm	Australia
Prop	James Graham	Canterbury-Bankstown Bulldogs	
Hooker	Cameron Smith	Melbourne Storm	Australia
Second-row	Nate Myles	Gold Coast Titans	Australia
Lock/Loose forward	Paul Gallen	Cronulla-Sutherland Sharks	Australia

2013
Position	Player	Club	National team
Fullback	Greg Inglis	South Sydney Rabbitohs	Australia
Wing	Roger Tuivasa-Sheck	Sydney Roosters	New Zealand
Centre	Jamie Lyon	Manly-Warringah Sea Eagles	
Five-eighth/Stand-off	Danny Brough	Huddersfield Giants	Scotland
Halfback/Scrum-half	Daly Cherry-Evans	Manly-Warringah Sea Eagles	Australia
Prop	Sam Burgess	South Sydney Rabbitohs	England
Hooker	Issac Luke	South Sydney Rabbitohs	New Zealand
Second-row	Sonny Bill Williams	Sydney Roosters	New Zealand
Lock/Loose forward	Corey Parker	Brisbane Broncos	Australia

== Nations' Players of the Year ==
	2008	2009	2011	2012	2014
Canada			Matt Wyles	Tony Felix	Steve Piatek
Cook Islands	Adam Watene	Karl Temata	Tinirau Arona	Tinirau Arona	Dominique Peyroux
Czech Republic		Josef Kučera	Jan Buben	David Lahr	
Estonia		Alex Janov			
Fiji	Ashton Sims	Jarryd Hayne	Wes Naiqama	Sisa Waqa	Semi Radradra
France		Olivier Elima	Rémi Casty	Vincent Duport	Rémi Casty
Germany		Jimmy Keinhorst	Thomas Isaak	Mawuli Améfia	
Ireland		Damien Blanch	Liam Finn	Tim Bergin	Liam Finn
Italy		Giovanni Franchi	Matteo Rossi	Fabrizio Ciaurro	
Jamaica		Roy Calvert	Tyronie Rowe	Fabion Turner	Nathan Campbell
Japan		Hiroshi Miyazak	Keisuke Kinoshita	Noriyuki Tainaka	
Latvia		Kristaps Jakushs			
Lebanon	George Ndaira	Ramy Rassi	Walid Yassine	Danny Barakat	Chris Saab
Malta			Clifford Debattista	Clifford Debattista	
Morocco				Souhail Ait Alla	
Papua New Guinea	Paul Aiton	David Mead		Dion Aiye	Israel Eliab
Russia		Nikolay Zagoskin	Eduard Ososkov	Sergey Konstantinov	Kirill Kosharin
Samoa		Kylie Leuluai	George Carmont	Tony Puletua	David Fa'alogo
Scotland		Iain Morrison	Dale Ferguson	John Duffy	Matty Russell
Serbia		Soni Radovanović	Dalibor Vukanović	Stefan Nedeljković	Stefan Nedeljković
South Africa		Andre Loader	Deon Kraemer	Stevie Meyer	Ruaan du Preez
Sweden			Alexander Rappestad	Tobias Rorstam	
Tonga	Michael Jennings	Richard Faʻaoso	Feleti Mateo	Brent Kite	Jason Taumalolo
Ukraine		Mikhail Troyan	Vladimir Mashkin		Oleksandr Skorbach
United States	Greg Stelluti	Siose Muliumu	Apple Pope	Michael Garvey	Joseph Paulo
Wales		Jordan James	Lloyd White	Rhodri Lloyd	Rhys Evans

== Awards No Longer Presented ==
=== International Newcomer of the Year ===
- 2004 Sonny Bill Williams, New Zealand
- 2005 Manu Vatuvei, New Zealand
- 2006 Greg Inglis, Australia
- 2007 Israel Folau, Australia (awarded by Rugby League World)

=== Developing Nations Player of the Year ===
- 2004 Jamal Fakir, France
- 2005 Jamal Fakir, France
- 2006 Wes Naiqama, Fiji
- 2007 George Ndaira, Lebanon (awarded by Rugby League World)

=== International Back of the Year ===
- 2004 Darren Lockyer, Australia
- 2005 Anthony Minichiello, Australia
- 2006 Darren Lockyer, Australia
- 2007 Johnathan Thurston, Australia (awarded by Rugby League World)

=== International Forward of the Year ===
- 2004 Andrew Farrell, England
- 2005 Stuart Fielden, England
- 2006 Jamie Peacock, England
- 2007 Jamie Peacock, England (awarded by Rugby League World)

== See also ==
- Rugby League World Golden Boot Award
- Rugby League International Federation
