= Yow Yeh =

Yow Yeh is a Chinese surname. Notable people with the surname include:

- Jharal Yow Yeh (born 1989), Australian professional rugby league player
- Kevin Yow Yeh (1941−1975), Australian professional rugby league player
