= 2011 State of Origin series =

Australian rugby league series

- Won by: Queensland (16th title)
- Series margin: 2–1
- Points scored: 112
- Attendance: 186,607 (ave. 62,202 per match)
- Top points scorer(s): Johnathan Thurston – 20
- Top try scorer(s): Greg Inglis; Billy Slater; Cameron Smith; Jharal Yow Yeh; Anthony Minichiello; All 2

The 2011 State of Origin series was the 30th annual best-of-three series of interstate rugby league football matches between the Queensland and New South Wales representative teams contested under "State of Origin" selection rules. For the third successive year a Queensland victory set a new record for consecutive State of Origin titles, reaching six. Game I was played in Brisbane, Game II in Sydney and Game III was again played in Brisbane. Game III was also Australia's most watched sports TV programme for the year 2011.

Mal Meninga continued on as coach of Queensland whilst New South Wales had chosen to follow the successful Maroons approach by appointing Ricky Stuart as a full-time Origin coach (with no other club commitments) in an attempt to rebuild a winning mentality for the team and the State, after being beaten in the 2010 series 3–0 for the first time since 1995. Despite a much improved New South Wales outfit, Queensland stretched their series-winning streak to six titles, securing it with a 34–24 victory in the third and deciding game of the series in front of a record equalling 52,498 fans at Suncorp Stadium. The series also marked Queensland skipper Darren Lockyer's final series, winning in his 36th and final State of Origin game. Queensland hooker Cameron Smith was awarded the Wally Lewis Medal as Player of the Series.

== Game I ==
Like his predecessor as New South Wales coach Craig Bellamy, Ricky Stuart was brought in to coach against Meninga, who was captaining Canberra in the 1990 NSWRL season's Grand final victory when Stuart and Bellamy both played under him. Stuart was reported to have been given by selectors the team of his choosing and in doing so, picked five Origin debutantes in Akuila Uate, Josh Dugan, Jamie Soward, Trent Merrin and Dean Young. The strong form of the St George Illawarra Dragons was acknowledged with the selection of seven from that club side in Soward, Young, Merrin, Ben Creagh, Brett Morris, Mark Gasnier and Beau Scott. Queensland stuck with their successful line-up from 2010 although injuries to centres Greg Inglis and Justin Hodges saw call-ups for Brisbane's Jharal Yow Yeh and Melbourne's Dane Nielsen to don the Maroon jersey for their first time.

Wednesday, 25 May 2011
20:00

Queensland	16 – 12	New South Wales
Tries; Thurston (5') 1 Yow Yeh (46') 1 Slater (73') 1 Goals; Thurston 2/4 (7', 74')	Report; Game details	Tries; 1 (65') Pearce; 1 (69') Jennings; Goals; 2/2 Soward (66', 71')

Suncorp Stadium, Brisbane
Attendance: 52,144
Referee: Tony Archer, Jared Maxwell
Player of the Match: Cameron Smith

Pre-match entertainment was provided by James Blunt before the Australian national anthem was performed by The Ten Tenors.

The Queensland forwards led by Petero Civoniceva and Matthew Scott bustled the New South Wales pack from the kick off and appeared to have the upper hand in the early stage of the game enabling the Maroons to run off each other and take ground. When Johnathan Thurston scored in the fifth minute off a Cameron Smith grubber it looked as though the Blues could be in for a long night. But the New South Wales team galvanised its defence and managed to hold Queensland out for the entire remainder of the first half in spite of Queensland forcing repeated sets close to the Blues tryline through the excellent kicking performances of Thurston and Darren Lockyer. New South Wales gained composure as the half went on and put pressure on the Queensland defence at times, although scoring opportunities were few and the kicking games of Soward and Mitchell Pearce were covered well by the classy Queensland backs. New South Wales would have taken heart from the 0–6 scoreline at the break.

Six minutes into the second half a grubber kick for the corner from Cooper Cronk for the Maroons looked to be covered by Brett Morris but when Morris opted to shield instead of taking the ball, Queensland debutante winger Jharal Yow Yeh pounced and took the scoreline to 10–0 to Queensland. From the 50th to the 60th minute Queensland threw everything at the Blues and pinpoint kick finishes ensured repeat sets. New South Wales at one point defended six consecutive sets, tackling heroically and solidly showing the kind of understanding and team communication that would be expected of well seasoned club combinations. Thurston missed a penalty goal from close range and as if buoyed by the reprieve New South Wales came to life turning defence into attack and scoring two tries quickly in the 65th then 69th minutes of the match. Firstly a missed tackle from Civoniceva on Greg Bird created an opportunity for Pearce to collect a pass from Bird and score under the posts. Then four minutes later Blues speedster Michael Jennings scored and New South Wales took a 12–10 lead with ten minutes to play.

After an immediate response from the Queensland forwards who took the play into Blues territory the senior Queensland playmakers took control and surprised New South Wales with a simple Smith to Thurston to Lockyer play who in turn put an inside ball to Slater to score in the 73rd minute. Thurston converted and after a final period when the Maroons showed their experience in defence, the match finished with a 16–12 scoreline to Queensland and a 1–0 start to the series.

== Game II ==
The New South Wales' selected squad for Game Two saw numerous changes, mainly due to injury concerns and position transfers. Backs Brett Morris, Michael Jennings and prop Kade Snowden all missed selection due to injuries suffered in their previous club games. Blues Fullback Josh Dugan later joined the injury list shortly following selection, injuring his ankle only hours before the squad was announced. He was replaced by experienced Sydney Roosters fullback Anthony Minichiello (the only remaining survivor from New South Wales' last series victory in 2005), playing his first Origin game since 2007. Jarryd Hayne and William Hopoate joined the squad to replace the injured Morris and Jennings respectively, with Hopoate becoming New South Wales' third youngest player to debut into the squad, behind Brad Fittler and Jarryd Hayne who also both debuted at 19.

Other notable inclusions included utility Kurt Gidley and backrowers Anthony Watmough and Luke Lewis on the interchange. Blues Captain Paul Gallen was chosen to play at prop at game II despite being a recognized back rower, at the expense of Jason King. Gallen's reassignment saw a reshuffle in the back row with Ben Creagh filling in at second row and Greg Bird covering in at lock.

Wednesday 15 June 2011
20:00

New South Wales	18 – 8	Queensland
Tries; Lewis (30') 1 Hopoate (49') 1 Minichiello (77') 1 Goals; Soward 3/4 (31', 50', 77')	Report; Game details	Tries; 1 (25') Smith; Goals; 2/2 Thurston (3', 26')

ANZ Stadium, Sydney
Attendance: 81,965
Referee: Shayne Hayne, Ben Cummins
Player of the Match: Paul Gallen

Queensland's Johnathan Thurston landed a penalty goal 2 minutes in to make it 0-2 before the game had clicked into gear. Cameron Smith's try and 'JT' scoring the conversion made it 0-8 and the Blues were looking doomed. Luke Lewis caught a Mitchell Pearce bomb and Jamie Soward curled a terrific sideline conversion to make it 8–6.

Desperate to avoid losing a sixth consecutive series, the Blues, trailing 8–6 at halftime managed to keep Queensland scoreless in the second half whilst at the same time scoring tries through debutant William Hopoate and Anthony Minichiello to score a series-levelling 18–8 victory. Minichiello was one of only two NSW players who played in the last victorious NSW side, the other being Mark Gasnier. The Maroons' loss was their first in Sydney since Game I, 2008, their equal lowest score at the venue since Game I, 2004 and their lowest score in any Origin game since Game III, 2007.

The Australian National Anthem was performed by the Sydney Children's Choir and the Gondwana National Indigenous Children's Choir.

== Game III ==
Queensland, in its bid to win a sixth straight series, recalled Justin Hodges from injury, thus relegating Dane Nielsen to 18th man. Suspension to David Taylor also led to the re-selection of Jacob Lillyman back onto the Maroons' bench. New South Wales chose to pick an initial squad of 20 due to injury concerns to several players. Keith Galloway made his Origin debut from the bench at the expense of Trent Merrin, with Merrin called back into the squad as 18th man as cover for Beau Scott and Glenn Stewart. Only hours before the match it was confirmed that both Michael Jennings and Beau Scott both succumbed to their injuries and made late withdrawals, forcing Jarryd Hayne to move from wing to centre with Brett Morris starting on the wing and Glenn Stewart replacing Scott.

Wednesday, 6 July 2011
20:00

Queensland	34 – 24	New South Wales
Tries; Inglis (16', 69') 2 Thaiday (25') 1 Smith (31') 1 Yow Yeh (34') 1 Slater (65') 1 Goals; Thurston 4/4 (17', 26', 32', 35'); Smith 1/2 (66')	Report; Game details	Tries; 1 (38') Minichiello; 1 (40') Uate; 1 (72') Hayne (8 pt); 1 (78') Bird; Goals; 4/5 Soward (39', 72', 73', 79')

Suncorp Stadium, Brisbane
Attendance: 52,498
Referee: Tony Archer, Shayne Hayne
Player of the Match: Cameron Smith

Queensland scored four quick tries within 20 minutes to shoot out to a 24–0 lead with five minutes to play to half-time, before two late NSW tries got the margin back to 24–10 by half-time. But then the Maroons turned on the after-burners with two more tries, and another two late tries to the Blues (including an eight-point try to Jarryd Hayne) reduced the final margin to 34–24, ensuring yet another Queensland series victory, their sixth in succession, and sentencing New South Wales to yet another year in the Origin doldrums. There is set to be another review of the New South Wales operations after yet another series loss.

One sour note for the Maroons was a potentially season-ending injury to halfback Johnathan Thurston, who is the most likely to inherit Darren Lockyer's No. 6 jersey for the 2012 series. It was later revealed that Thurston suffered a less serious knee injury, ruling him out for up to a month and triggering a form slump for his club the North Queensland Cowboys (which fell from the top four at the time of Thurston's injury to a final position of 7th at season's end). Also, captain-in-waiting and Wally Lewis Medallist Cameron Smith was cleared of a charge of kneeing New South Wales centre Jarryd Hayne which resulted in an eight-point try awarded to the Blues.

== Teams ==
The 18th man is a reserve to cover for any forthcoming injuries and, unless chosen, does not actually play.

=== New South Wales Blues ===
Position	Game 1	Game 2	Game 3
Fullback	Josh Dugan	Anthony Minichiello ^{1}	
Wing	Brett Morris	Jarryd Hayne	Brett Morris
Centre	Michael Jennings	William Hopoate	Jarryd Hayne
Centre	Mark Gasnier		
Wing	Akuila Uate		
Five-Eighth	Jamie Soward		
Halfback	Mitchell Pearce		
Prop	Jason King	Tim Mannah	
Hooker	Dean Young ^{2}	Michael Ennis	
Prop	Kade Snowden	Paul Gallen (c)	
2nd Row	Beau Scott		Glenn Stewart
2nd Row	Greg Bird	Ben Creagh	
Lock	Paul Gallen (c)	Greg Bird	
Interchange	Michael Ennis	Kurt Gidley	
Interchange	Ben Creagh	Anthony Watmough	
Interchange	Trent Merrin		Keith Galloway
Interchange	Tim Mannah	Luke Lewis	
18th man	Jamal Idris	Tom Learoyd-Lahrs	Trent Merrin
Coach	Ricky Stuart		

1 - Josh Dugan was originally selected to play but withdrew due to injury. He was replaced by Anthony Minichiello.
2 - Dean Young switched places with Michael Ennis to play in the starting side after being initially selected for the bench.

=== Queensland Maroons ===
Position	Game 1	Game 2	Game 3
Fullback	Billy Slater		
Wing	Darius Boyd		
Centre	Dane Nielsen		Justin Hodges
Centre	Willie Tonga	Greg Inglis	
Wing	Jharal Yow Yeh		
Five-Eighth	Darren Lockyer (c)		
Halfback	Johnathan Thurston		
Prop	Matthew Scott		
Hooker	Cameron Smith		
Prop	Petero Civoniceva		
2nd Row	Nate Myles		
2nd Row	Sam Thaiday		
Lock	Ashley Harrison		
Interchange	Cooper Cronk		
Interchange	Corey Parker		
Interchange	Jacob Lillyman	David Taylor	Jacob Lillyman
Interchange	Ben Hannant		
18th Man	David Taylor	Jacob Lillyman	Dane Nielsen
Coach	Mal Meninga		

== See also ==
- 2011 NRL season
- 2011 City vs Country
