= Dane Nielsen =

Australian rugby league footballer

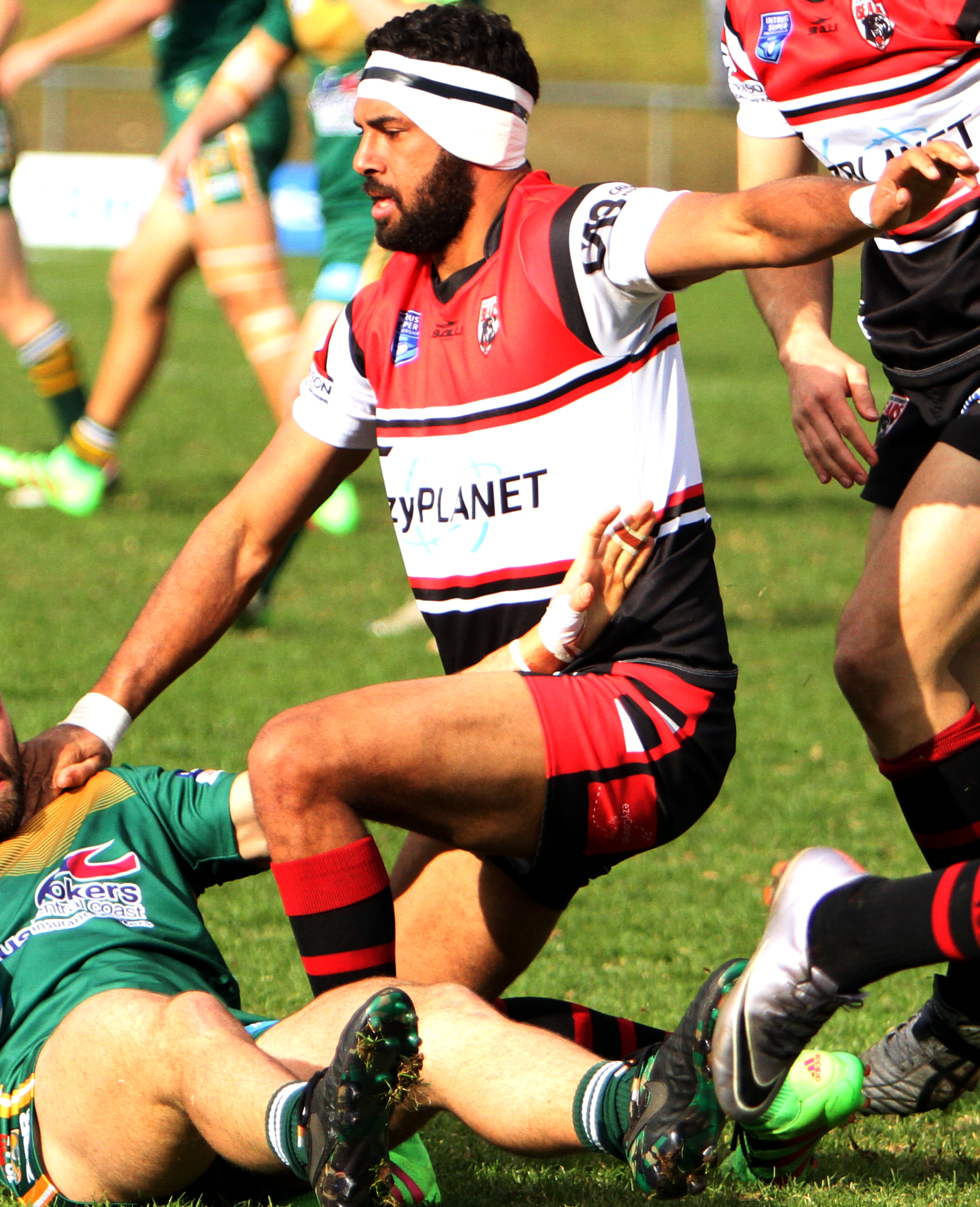

Personal information
- Born: 10 June 1985 (age 41) Mackay, Queensland, Australia

Playing information
- Height: 188 cm (6 ft 2 in)
- Weight: 96 kg (15 st 2 lb)
- Position: Centre, Wing
Club
Years	Team	Pld	T	G	FG	P
2007	Cronulla Sharks	1	0	0	0	0
2008–12	Melbourne Storm	79	24	0	0	96
2013–14	New Zealand Warriors	30	2	0	0	8
2015	St. George Illawarra	2	1	0	0	4
2015	Bradford Bulls	5	0	0	0	0
2016–17	South Sydney	7	3	0	0	12
	Total	124	30	0	0	120
Representative
Years	Team	Pld	T	G	FG	P
2011–12	Queensland	3	0	0	0	0
2013	Indigenous All Stars	1	0	0	0	0

Dane Nielsen (born 10 June 1985) is an Australian former professional rugby league footballer. A Queensland State of Origin representative, he played as a centre and wing. He previously played in the NRL for the Cronulla-Sutherland Sharks, Melbourne Storm, with whom he won the 2012 NRL Premiership, the New Zealand Warriors, St. George Illawarra, South Sydney and also the Bradford Bulls in the English Super League.

== Early years ==
From the North Queensland town of Mackay, Nielsen is of Indigenous Australian and Solomon Island descent.

He was a Norths Devils junior.

== Playing career ==
Nielsen started his NRL career with the Cronulla-Sutherland Sharks, making his début on 20 July 2007 against the Manly-Warringah Sea Eagles.

=== Melbourne Storm ===
In 2008 Nielsen joined the Melbourne Storm, becoming a regular at centre. In 2009 Nielsen was sent-off for a high tackle in the Storm's round 15 clash with the Wests Tigers. He played for Melbourne on the wing in their 2009 NRL Grand Final win against the Parramatta Eels (which was stripped from the club after their salary cap scandal). Nielsen then went on to play in Melbourne's 2010 World Club Challenge victory against English champions, the Leeds Rhinos.

Nielsen was named as injured Greg Inglis' replacement at centre in the Queensland side for Game I and II of the 2011 State of Origin series.

In May 2012, he signed a three-year deal with the New Zealand Warriors starting in 2013. Later that year he played in the third and deciding game of the 2012 State of Origin series which Queensland won. At the end of the season Nielsen played for the Melbourne Storm in their 2012 NRL Grand final victory over the Canterbury-Bankstown Bulldogs.

=== New Zealand Warriors ===
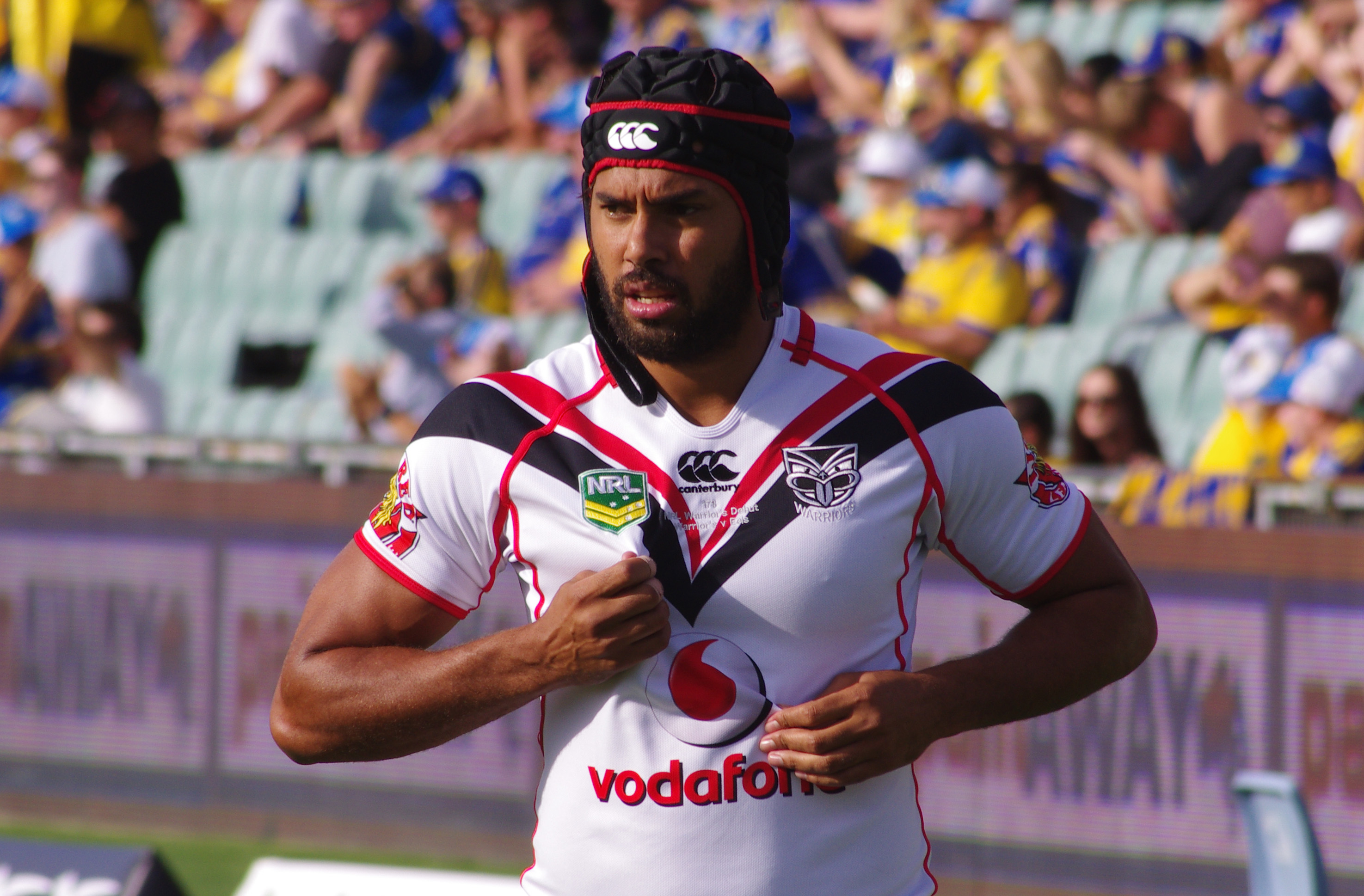
Nielsen playing for the Warriors in 2013

Nielsen moved to Auckland for the 2013 New Zealand Warriors season, also the first for the club's new Australian coach Matthew Elliott.

=== St George Illawarra Dragons ===
On 19 November 2014, Nielsen signed a two-year deal with the St George Illawarra Dragons, starting from the 2015 season.

On 5 May 2015, Nielsen had his contract with the Dragons terminated due to disciplinary reasons. It was alleged that a woman had made a complaint to the St George hierarchy claiming that an intoxicated Nielsen bit her on the leg on a night out on 22 March 2015. The club launched an inquiry into the complaint, and on 5 May 2015 announced their decision to terminate the players contract.

=== Bradford Bulls ===
After several games in the Mackay & District Rugby League, Nielsen signed a year and a half contract with the Bradford Bulls on 28 July 2015.

Nielsen featured in Qualifier 3 (Salford Red Devils) to Qualifier 6 (Leigh Centurions). Nielsen played in the £1 Million Game against Wakefield Trinity Wildcats.

=== South Sydney Rabbitohs ===
On 25 January 2016, Nielsen returned to Australia, signing a two-year contract with South Sydney. He also played in the NSW Cup for the Rabbitohs feeder club, the North Sydney Bears. Nielsen made his debut for the club in round 8, playing in the centres in the 30–8 loss to the Brisbane Broncos.

In January 2017, he was sent home from South Sydney training after turning up "looking worse for wear", after an alleged drunken night out. He played most of the first half of the season for the North Sydney Bears with the likes of Alex Johnston, Bryson Goodwin, Aaron Gray, Hymel Hunt, Robert Jennings, Siosifa Talakai, Cody Walker and even backrower Tyrell Fuimaono obtaining positions in the centres and on the wings.

== Later career ==
On 21 July 2017, English side Featherstone Rovers offered Nielsen a contract which he agreed to in principle but the deal fell through due to visa issues. On 23 July 2017, Nielsen signed on to play with the Mackay Magpies, returning to club that he played with in 2015.

On 28 March 2018, it was revealed that Nielsen had been sacked by Group 9 side Junee Diesels without playing a single game for the club. Nielsen was reportedly terminated after an alleged wild night out in Junee. Junee club president Simon Vanzanten spoke to the media saying "We don’t take it very lightly at all and if it was something that was minor everyone gets one chance, but we’ve drawn a line in the sand, "After a few things that happened with the club over the past couple of years we have come on board to make sure we have a club for my kids and for the future. We can’t put up with that sort of stuff".
