= Cameron Smith (rugby league, born 1983) =

Australia international rugby league footballer

Cameron Smith AM
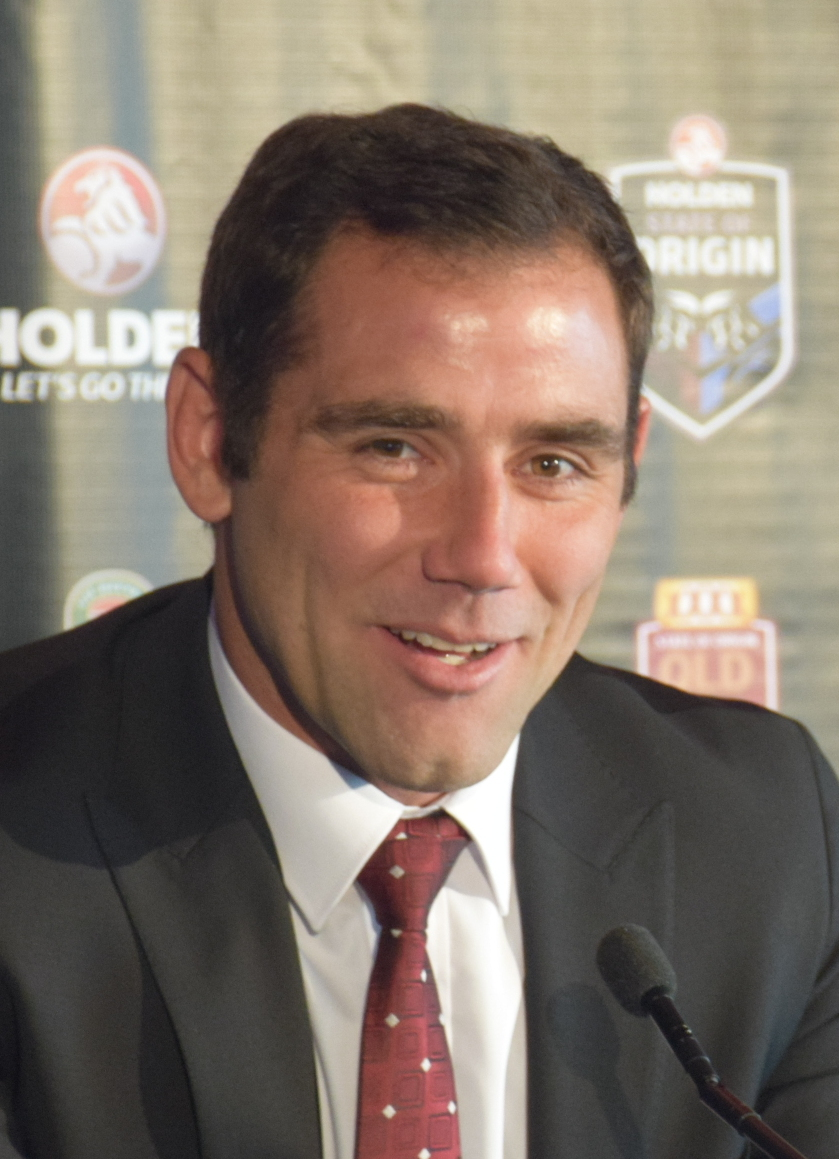
- Smith in 2015

Personal information
- Full name: Cameron Wayne Smith
- Born: 18 June 1983 (age 43) Brisbane, Queensland, Australia
- Height: 185 cm (6 ft 1 in)
- Weight: 92 kg (14 st 7 lb)

Playing information
- Position: Hooker Halfback
Club
Years	Team	Pld	T	G	FG	P
2002–20	Melbourne Storm	430	48	1295	4	2786
Representative
Years	Team	Pld	T	G	FG	P
2003–17	Queensland	42	5	19	0	58
2006–17	Australia	56	9	67	0	170
2010–16	All Stars	4	0	1	0	2
- Source: As of 10 March 2021

Cameron Wayne Smith (born 18 June 1983) is an Australian former professional rugby league footballer who played as a hooker, spending his entire career with the Melbourne Storm in the National Rugby League (NRL). He has also been an assistant coach of the Queensland rugby league team under former Melbourne teammate Billy Slater since 2022.

An Australian international and Queensland State of Origin representative, Smith is regarded as one of the greatest players of all time. During his nineteen-year career, Smith won the Dally M Medal as the NRL's player of the year in 2006 and 2017, the Golden Boot Award as the international player of the year in 2007 and 2017, and the NRL's Dally M Hooker of the Year on nine occasions. (Note: Smith won the Dally M Hooker of the Year in 2006, 2008, 2011, 2012, 2013, 2016, 2017, 2019 and 2020.) He was the captain of the Storm for fifteen years, (Note: Smith was one of the multiple captains used by Melbourne in 2006 and 2007 as part of their rotating captaincy system; he was their designated captain in the Grand Final of both of those seasons. Smith was the club's sole captain from 2008 to 2020.) during which time they won the 2012, 2017, and 2020 NRL Premierships, (Note: Not included are Melbourne's 2007 and 2009 Grand Finals wins, which were stripped due to long-term salary cap breaches.) and also Australia and Queensland from 2012 (Note: Officially named as captain of both Queensland and Australia from 2012 onwards, Smith had previously acted as captain in his predecessor Darren Lockyer's absence in all three games of the 2008 series for Queensland, and on five occasions for Australia between 2007 and 2011.) until his retirement from representative matches in 2018.

Considered a future Immortal, Smith is currently the NRL's games record holder, with 430 matches played; he is the only player to have played over 400 matches. He is also the highest all-time points scorer in NRL history, having surpassed Hazem El Masri's 2,418 points on 12 April 2019. Smith also holds the NRL records for most goals kicked (1295), most tackles made (16917), most grand final points scored (44) and most wins (310). Smith debuted in the NRL as a halfback and he also played as a five-eighth during his career.

Smith was appointed a Member of the Order of Australia (AM) in the 2019 Queen's Birthday Honours for his service to rugby league. He retired from professional rugby league in 2021.

== Early life ==
Smith was born on 18 June 1983 in Brisbane, Queensland, to parents Wayne and Sonia Smith (1957–2024). He grew up in the Logan area and attended Marsden State High School.

== Playing career ==
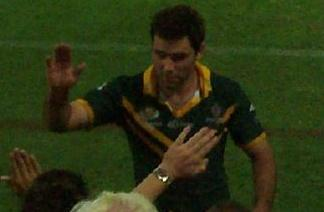
Smith on international duty with Australia in 2006

=== Early Career (2000–2001) ===
Smith played at hooker and five-eighth for the Logan Brothers in Logan City. After scoring 188 points for the Norths Devils in the Queensland Cup he moved up to the NRL with the Melbourne Storm club.

=== Joining the Storm (2002–2003) ===
Smith's first two games for Melbourne were during the 2002 NRL season, both played at halfback. He was called into the team following a car crash that involved Storm back-up halfback Marty Turner. Smith made his NRL debut in round 5, wearing the number 19 jersey against the Canterbury-Bankstown Bulldogs. His debut match was something of a shock, telling the media: I'm a bit surprised to be here this early. I was hopeful of getting a game later in the year and it's a bit of a shock particularly under the circumstances. I'm not going to think about the game too much before kick-off, not put too much pressure on myself." Smith proved himself "to be a player of the future with a tough performance in his debut." Smith was injured the following week, leaving the field with a knee injury.

Returning to the Queensland Cup, he won the Norths Devils player of the year award in 2002. The following year he played as the Storm's hooker. In 2003, the Queensland rugby league team were without a specialist hooker. After experimenting with different players in the position for the first two matches of the 2003 State of Origin series and losing both, Smith was named at hooker (No.9) for the third match. For the next six years, no other player wore the number 9 for the Maroons until this run of 19 consecutive Origins was cut due to injury. He was named the Melbourne Storm's rookie of the year in 2003.

=== Early success and Representative selection (2005–2007) ===
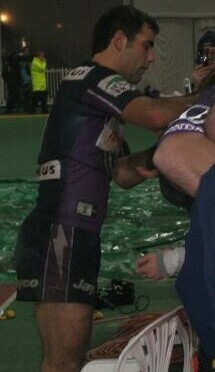
Smith with the Storm in 2007

In 2005, Smith was named the Melbourne Storm's player of the year. The following year he first represented Australia and won the Dally M Medal. Also in Round 3 of 2006 Smith captained the club for the first time and in what became a very successful year for him as later that year he led the Storm to the 2006 NRL Grand Final. During the grand final, while the game was still in the balance, he was forced from the field with injury, which the Storm's loss has been largely attributed to. At the Melbourne Storm awards night, Smith was named the Storm's 2006 player of the year.

Smith was selected to play for the Australian national team at hooker the 2007 ANZAC Test match victory against New Zealand. For the 2007 State of Origin series, Smith took out both the Wally Lewis Medal for player of the series and Ron Mcauliffe Medal for Queensland player of the series. He was also named the Melbourne Storm player of the year. Smith captained the Melbourne Storm in their 34–8 victory over the Manly-Warringah Sea Eagles in the 2007 NRL Grand Final.

=== Becoming captain (2008–2009) ===
Smith became regular captain of the Melbourne Storm in 2008. Smith captained the Maroons for the entire 2008 State of Origin series due to the absence of regular captain Darren Lockyer. The Maroons won the series, despite losing the first match 18–10. In August 2008, Smith was named in the preliminary 46-man Kangaroos squad for the 2008 Rugby League World Cup, and in October 2008 he was selected in the final 24-man Australia squad. Cameron was suspended for two weeks in the 2008 finals series after a grapple tackle on Brisbane's Sam Thaiday. The suspension would have only been one week had he not have carried over points from a previous grapple tackle in round 1 of the year's competition. This meant he was suspended for Melbourne's 2008 grand final. Melbourne Storm CEO Brian Waldron and coach Craig Bellamy claimed the judiciary had made their minds up before Cameron's case was heard. The judiciary panel members then threatened to sue the club if the comments were not retracted. Cameron signed a four-year extension to his contract in December 2008, resulting in him being a contracted player through to the end of at least the 2012 season. His contract is rumoured to be partly funded by third party sponsors who do not contribute to the standard salary cap. He became the Melbourne Storm's most experienced playing player due to the retirement of Matt Geyer at the end of 2008. He became the last current Storm player in the squad who played under Mark Murray as well as the only one to have played in a season when the Storm did not make the finals due to their performance (the Storm finished 10th in 2002, the year Smith made his debut).

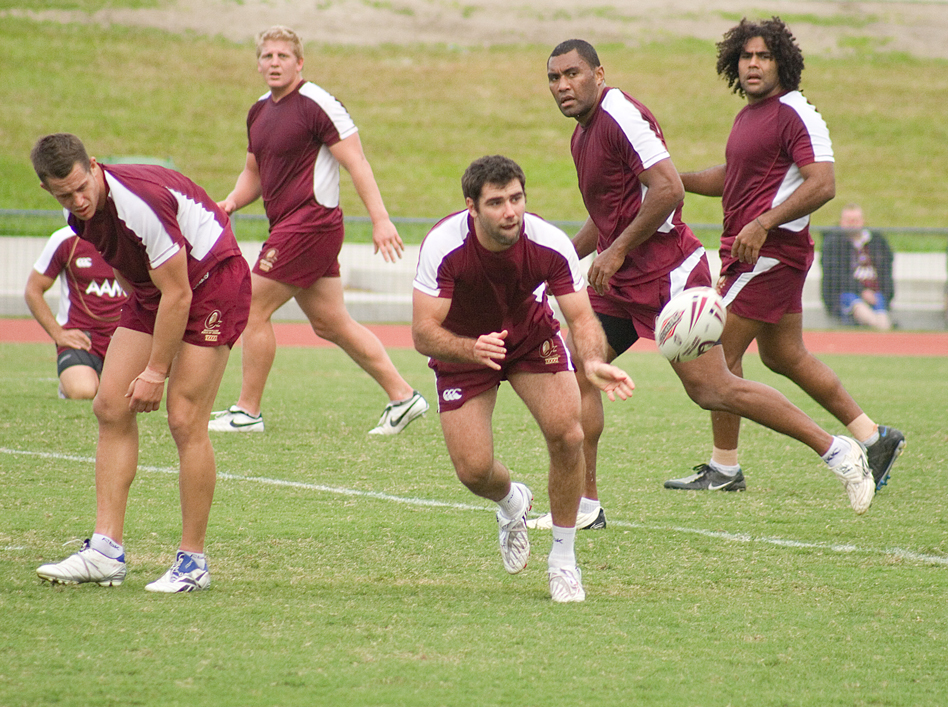
Smith (centre) training with the Maroons in 2009

In April 2009, he was named in the preliminary 25 man squad to represent Queensland in the opening State of Origin match for 2009. He was selected for Australia in the one-off test match against New Zealand on 8 May 2009. In the preliminary final in which Melbourne defeated the Brisbane Broncos 40–10, he became Storm's highest ever point scorer, beating Matt Orford's record of 877. Smith led the Storm in their 2009 NRL Grand Final victory over the Parramatta Eels. At the end of the season, he joined the Kangaroos on their campaign to win the 2009 Four Nations tournament in England. He scored the try that saved Australia from losing in the opening match and also scored in the Kangaroos' victory against England in the final.

Many of Smith's club achievements between the years of 2006 and 2010 were later placed under an asterisk after the Melbourne Storm were stripped of all honours achieved in those years due to the discovery of salary cap breaches within the club.

=== National captaincy and Premiership success (2010–2012) ===
In 2010, he played in the 2010 World Club Challenge at halfback in the absence of his usual number 7 Cooper Cronk due to injury. Smith kicked 5 goals and was named man of the match. For the 2010 ANZAC Test victory, Smith was selected to play at hooker. For the first time since Game II of the 2003 Origin series, Smith wasn't wearing the number 9 for Queensland, after he failed to overcome the elbow injury he sustained playing in that test. He was replaced by Matt Ballin. In Round 26 of the 2010 NRL season Smith became the first Melbourne Storm player to reach 1,000 points after successfully converting Ryan Hinchcliffe's try.

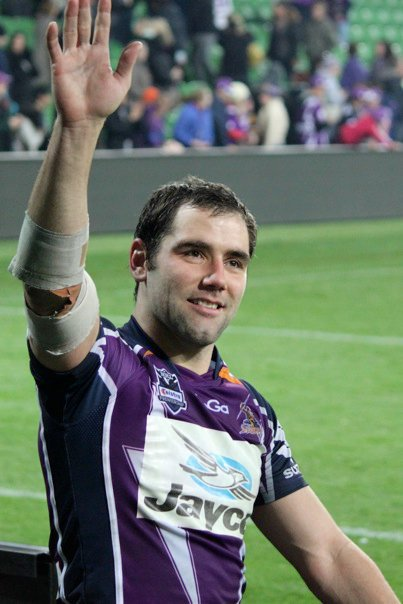
Smith playing for the Storm in 2010

Smith played in the 42–0 thrashing of the Papua New Guinea national rugby league team during the 2010 Four Nations. It was a game where he converted 5 tries and scored once. He was later named man of the match.

Smith was named man-of-the-match in Queensland's win in Game I and later Game III of the 2011 State of Origin series, subsequently resulting in his naming as the Wally Lewis medal winning man-of-the-series. On 3 November 2011 The annual RLIF Awards dinner was held at the Tower of London and Smith was named hooker of the year.

Following Darren Lockyer's retirement at the end of the 2011 season, Smith became captain of both Australia and Queensland. He captained both sides to the 2012 ANZAC Test and 2012 State of Origin series victories respectively. At the 2012 Dally M Awards Smith was named the NRL's hooker of the year. He captained Storm to victory in the 2012 NRL Grand Final over the Canterbury-Bankstown Bulldogs. Smith also received the Rugby League International Federation's international player of the year award for 2012.

=== World Cup success (2013–2016) ===
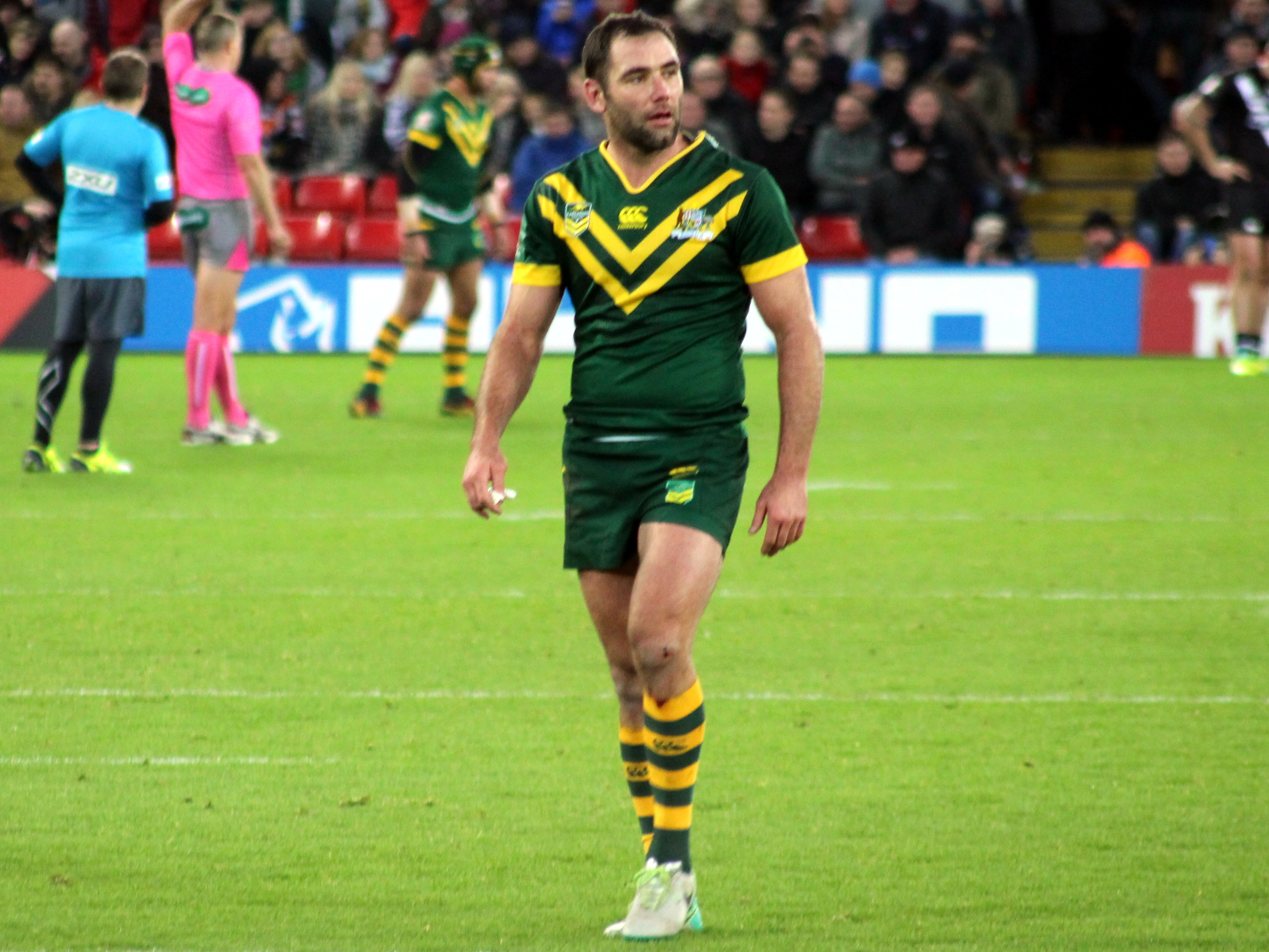
Smith playing for the Kangaroos at Anfield in 2016

In early 2013, Smith captained the Storm to victory in the 2013 World Club Challenge over Leeds earning the title of world champions. Smith captained Australia in the 2013 ANZAC Test and played at hooker. He kicked four goals from six attempts in what was the first test match ever played in Canberra. After victory in the third and deciding game of the 2013 State of Origin series Smith was awarded the Wally Lewis Medal for player of the series, in which he captained the Queensland team which extended their record winning streak to 8 years.

On 9 June 2013, Smith played his 250th game for the Melbourne Storm, the second only player to have achieved that feat.

Queensland's win in Game III of the 2014 State of Origin series made Smith the first player in State of Origin history to win 20 games.

On 30 November 2013, Smith captained Australia to a dominant 34 to 2 win against New Zealand in the 2013 Rugby League World Cup final ensuring the Australian side went through the entire tournament undefeated.

In November 2014, in the Four Nations game against England, Smith became just the sixth player to appear for Australia in 40 test matches.

On 9 July 2015, Smith captained Queensland to a 2 to 1 series win against New South Wales winning game three emphatically by 52 – 6. It was Smiths' 9th series win in ten years and his fourth series win as captain. At series end, Smith had equalled Darren Lockyer for most Queensland appearances with 36 and received his fifth man of the match award in game one to sit in equal second behind Wally Lewis for most man of the match awards in State of Origin.

On 17 July 2015, Smith became the Melbourne Storms' first 300-game player and only the 24th player in the history of the NRL to achieve such a feat. As of April 2017, Smith is one of only three current NRL players to have eclipsed 300 NRL games.

On 22 June 2016, Smith captained Queensland to their 10th series win in 11 years over New South Wales. Smith was awarded his sixth man of the match award in game 2 of Origin and was awarded the Wally Lewis medal as the player of the series for the fourth time at series end.

=== Setting records, World Cup and Premiership success (2017–2019) ===
On 10 March 2017, Smith reached 2000 career points in a match against the New Zealand Warriors, becoming the first forward, the first Queenslander, and just the fifth player in history to have achieved the milestone.

On 30 July 2017, Smith became only the 3rd player in NRL history to play 350 games, behind Darren Lockyer (355) and equal with Terry Lamb. On 9 September, he played his 356th match and thereby became NRL's most capped player of all time.

On 2 December 2017, he captained the Kangaroos to another World Cup victory, defeating England in the final 6–0. He was also named in the team of the tournament.

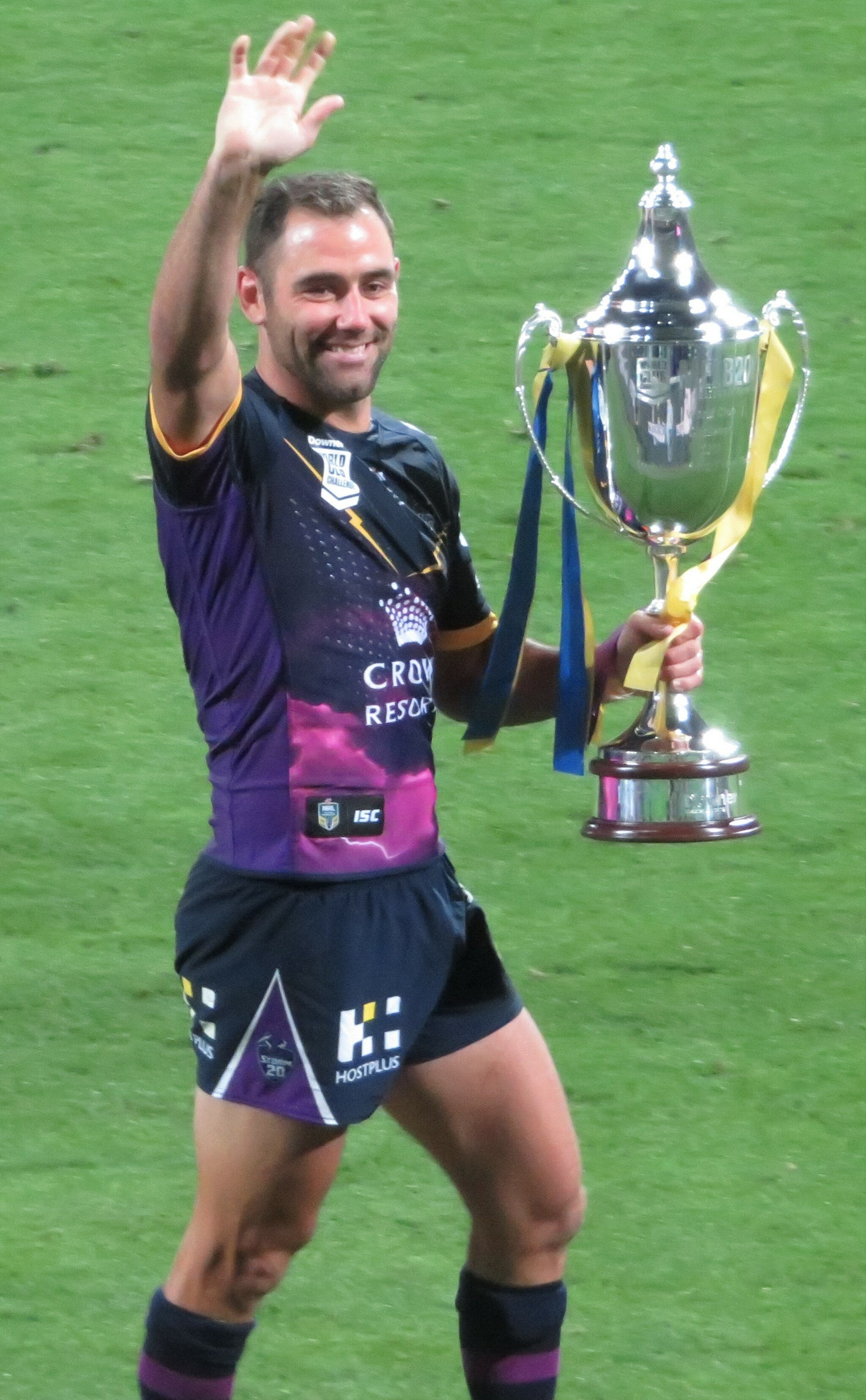
Smith holding the 2018 WCC trophy aloft

On 30 March 2018, during the round 4 fixture against the Sharks, Smith was sent to the sin bin for backchatting. This was Smith's first sin-binning in his career and the Storm lost the game 14–4 in a match that had 33 penalties in total.

On 15 May 2018, Smith announced his retirement from all representative football, making him unavailable for Queensland or Australian selection.

In July 2019, he became the first NRL player to play 400 games. The Herald Sun marked the occasion with a front-page photograph by Mark Stewart at AAMI Park showing Smith and the only four others to achieve the feat in Australia, all Australian rules footballers: North Melbourne's Brent Harvey (the AFL/VFL leader in games played with 432), Essendon's Dustin Fletcher, Hawthorn's Michael Tuck and Richmond's Kevin Bartlett. For perspective, just two NRL or AFL players has since replicated the feat: Shaun Burgoyne of Port Adelaide and Hawthorn in 2021, and Scott Pendlebury of Collingwood in 2024.

=== More Premiership success in COVID-affected year and retirement (2020–2021) ===
The Melbourne Storm 2020 NRL season saw Smith captain the team for his 13th consecutive year. The season was suspended indefinitely on 23 March 2020 due to the ongoing coronavirus pandemic; however, on 28 April 2020, the NRL announced it would recommence on 28 May as a 20-round competition with a revised draw. During the season, Smith landed 86 goals and scored a total of 184 points.

In Round 9, the Storm defeated the Canberra Raiders 20–14, with Smith reaching another milestone with 300 wins in the NRL. In Round 12, the Storm defeated the Knights in their 6th consecutive win, with Smith injuring his shoulder while scoring a try.

On 25 October 2020, Smith captained the Storm to another NRL Premiership, scoring 14 points including a try in a 26–20 Grand Final victory over the Penrith Panthers.

On 10 March 2021, the day before the start of the NRL season, Smith announced his retirement from professional rugby league.

== Post playing ==
=== Hall of Fame ===
In August 2024, the National Rugby League announced that Smith was an inductee into the National Rugby League Hall of Fame. Smith, who was ascribed Hall of Fame number 120, was amongst eleven male players in the 2024 Class.

In Early 2025, Smith was named a co-host for 100% Footy.

On 6 November 2025 it was announced that Smith had joined the coaching staff of the Brisbane Broncos.

== Honours ==
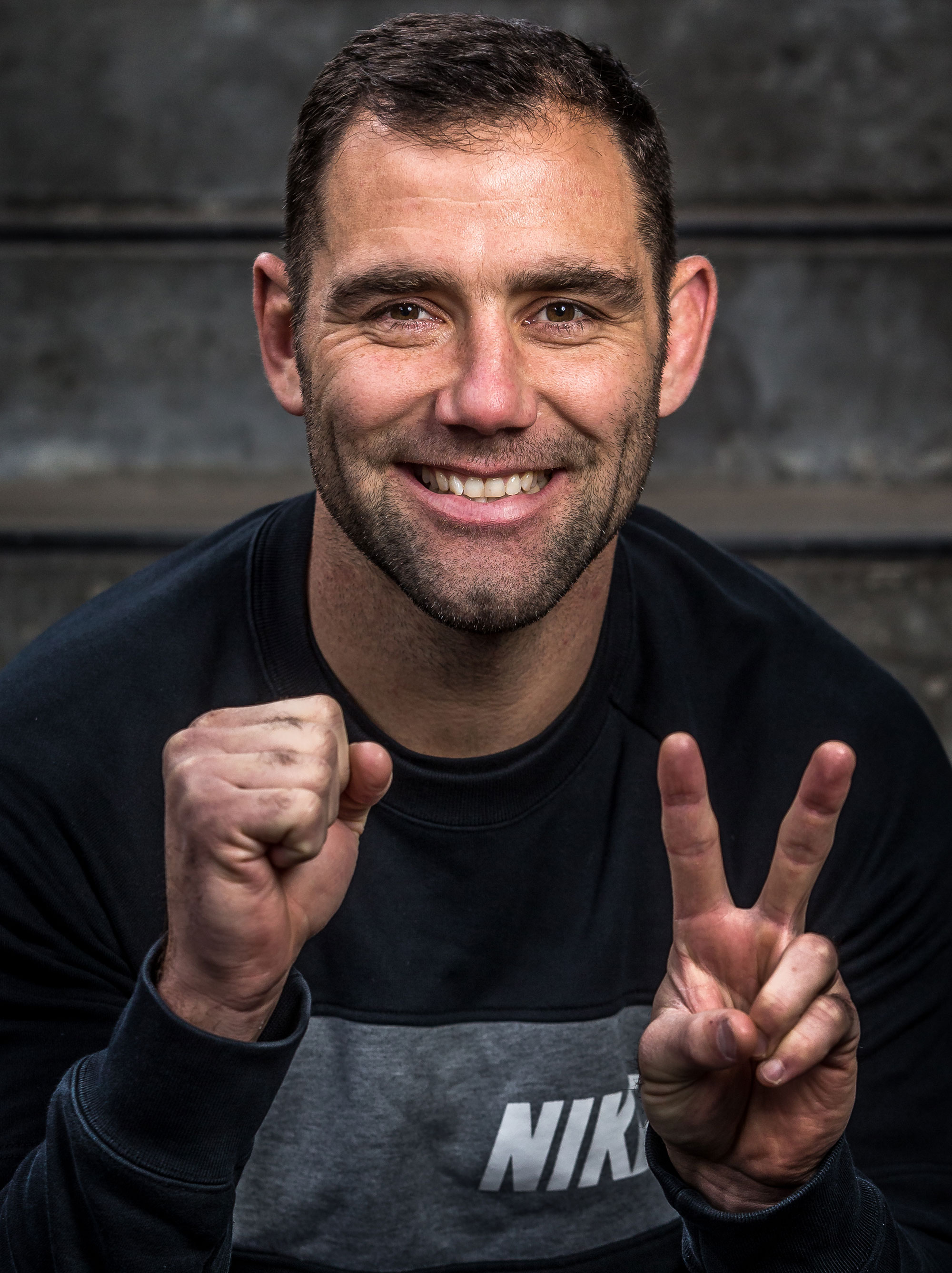
Smith in 2017

Individual

- 1× Melbourne Storm Rookie of the Year: 2003
- 4× Ron McAuliffe Medal: 2005, 2007, 2013, 2015
- 2× Dally M Medal Player of The Year: 2006, 2017
- 9× Dally M Hooker of The Year: 2006, 2008, 2011, 2012, 2013, 2016, 2017, 2019, 2020
- 1× NRL – Most points in a season by a hooker: 2006 (192)
- 4× Wally Lewis Medal (State of Origin): 2007, 2011, 2013, 2016
- 4× Dally M Representative Player of the Year: 2007, 2011, 2013, 2016
- 2× Rugby League World Golden Boot Award: 2007, 2017
- 4× RLIF Hooker of The Year: 2008, 2009, 2011, 2012
- 5× Dally M Captain of the Year: 2011, 2013, 2017, 2018, 2019
- 8× Melbourne Storm Player of the Year: 2005, 2006, 2007, 2011, 2012, 2013, 2017, 2020
- 1× RLIF Player of The Year: 2012
- 2× Harry Sunderland Medal: 2014, 2017
- 4× Melbourne Storm Forward of the Year (Award introduced in 2012): 2014, 2015, 2016, 2019
- 1× RLIF Golden Cap: 2018
- 400 games in the NRL: 2019
- 300 game wins in the NRL: 2020
- 40 finals appearances: 2020
- Melbourne Storm Captain: 327 games (2006–2020)
- Queensland Captain: 21 games (2008, 2012–2017)
- Australian Captain: 33 games (2007–2017)
- National Rugby League Hall of Fame inductee: #120 2024
- Sport Australia Hall of Fame inductee (athlete): 2025

Club

- 3× NRL Grand Final Winners: 2012, 2017, 2020
- 4× Minor Premiership (J. J. Giltinan Shield): 2011, 2016, 2017, 2019
- 3× NRL Grand Final Runner-Up: 2006, 2016, 2018
- 3× World Club Challenge Winners: 2010, 2013, 2018

Representative

- 11× State of Origin Winners: 2006, 2007, 2008, 2009, 2010, 2011, 2012, 2013, 2015, 2016, 2017
- 1× Tri Nations Winners: 2006
- 2× Rugby League World Cup Winners: 2013, 2017
- 3× Four Nations Winners: 2009, 2011, 2016

== Statistics ==
=== NRL ===
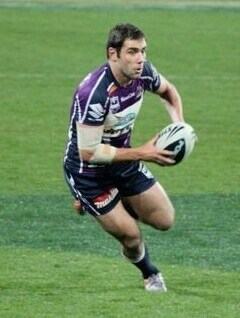
Smith playing for Melbourne in 2010

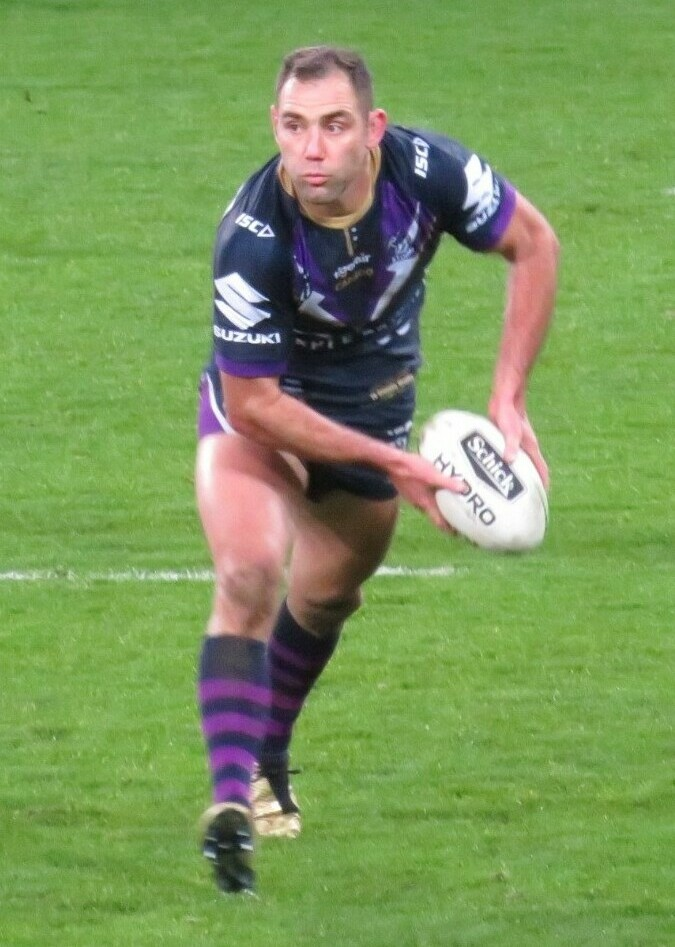
Smith playing for Melbourne in 2019

Statistics are correct to the end of the 2020 NRL Season.

†	Denotes seasons in which Smith won an NRL Premiership
†	Denotes seasons in which Smith won an NRL Premiership that was later stripped

Year	Team	Games	T	G	GK %	F/G	Pts	W	L	D	W-L %
2002	Melbourne Storm	2	0	0	—	0	0	1	1	0	50.00
2003	Melbourne Storm	24	4	8	88.89	0	32	15	9	0	62.50
2004	Melbourne Storm	23	4	43	69.35	0	102	12	11	0	52.17
2005	Melbourne Storm	23	3	30	68.18	0	72	13	10	0	56.52
2006	Melbourne Storm	25	5	79	71.17	0	178	21	4	0	84.00
2007†	Melbourne Storm	24	4	88	70.97	0	192	21	3	0	87.50
2008	Melbourne Storm	23	4	77	69.37	0	170	18	5	0	78.26
2009†	Melbourne Storm	25	3	65	72.22	0	142	16	8	1	64.00
2010	Melbourne Storm	20	2	54	75.00	0	116	12	8	0	60.00
2011	Melbourne Storm	24	2	78	83.87	0	164	19	5	0	79.17
2012†	Melbourne Storm	25	2	78	69.64	0	164	20	5	0	80.00
2013	Melbourne Storm	23	2	84	74.34	0	176	16	6	1	69.57
2014	Melbourne Storm	23	2	68	70.83	1	145	13	10	0	56.52
2015	Melbourne Storm	25	1	71	78.89	0	146	15	10	0	60.00
2016	Melbourne Storm	26	2	92	75.41	2	194	21	5	0	80.77
2017†	Melbourne Storm	23	2	92	79.31	0	192	21	2	0	91.30
2018	Melbourne Storm	26	1	98	82.35	1	201	18	8	0	69.23
2019	Melbourne Storm	27	2	104	79.39	0	216	21	6	0	77.78
2020†	Melbourne Storm	19	3	86	84.31	0	106	17	2	0	89.47
Career totals		430	48	1295	75.29	4	2792	310	118	2	72.09

* = Unfinished season

=== State of Origin ===
†	Denotes seasons in which Smith won a State of Origin Series

Season	Team	Matches	T	G	GK %	F/G	Pts	W	L	D	W-L %
2003	Queensland	1	1	0	—	0	4	1	0	0	100.00
2004	Queensland	3	0	5	62.50	0	10	1	2	0	33.33
2005	Queensland	3	0	9	81.81	0	18	1	2	0	33.33
2006†	Queensland	3	0	0	—	0	0	2	1	0	66.66
2007†	Queensland	3	0	0	—	0	0	2	1	0	66.66
2008†	Queensland	3	0	0	—	0	0	2	1	0	66.66
2009†	Queensland	3	1	0	—	0	4	2	1	0	66.66
2010†	Queensland	2	0	0	—	0	0	2	0	0	100.00
2011†	Queensland	3	2	1	50.00	0	10	2	1	0	66.66
2012†	Queensland	3	0	0	—	0	0	2	1	0	66.66
2013†	Queensland	3	0	1	100.00	0	2	2	1	0	66.66
2014	Queensland	3	1	0	—	0	4	1	2	0	33.33
2015†	Queensland	3	0	0	—	0	0	2	1	0	66.66
2016†	Queensland	3	0	0	—	0	0	2	1	0	66.66
2017†	Queensland	3	0	3	50.00	0	6	2	1	0	66.66
Career totals		42	5	19	67.85	0	64	26	16	0	61.90

=== Australia ===
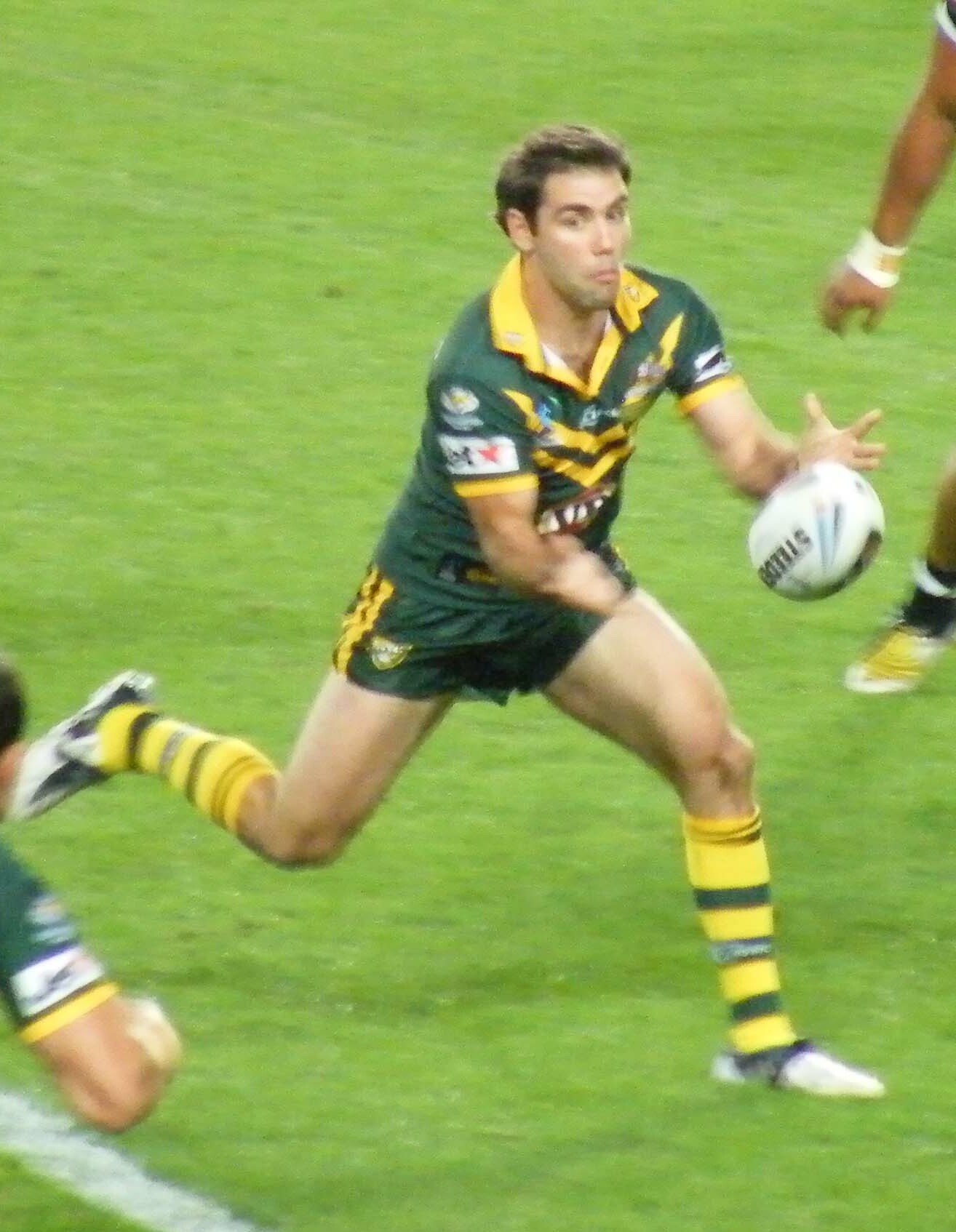
Smith playing for the Kangaroos in 2008

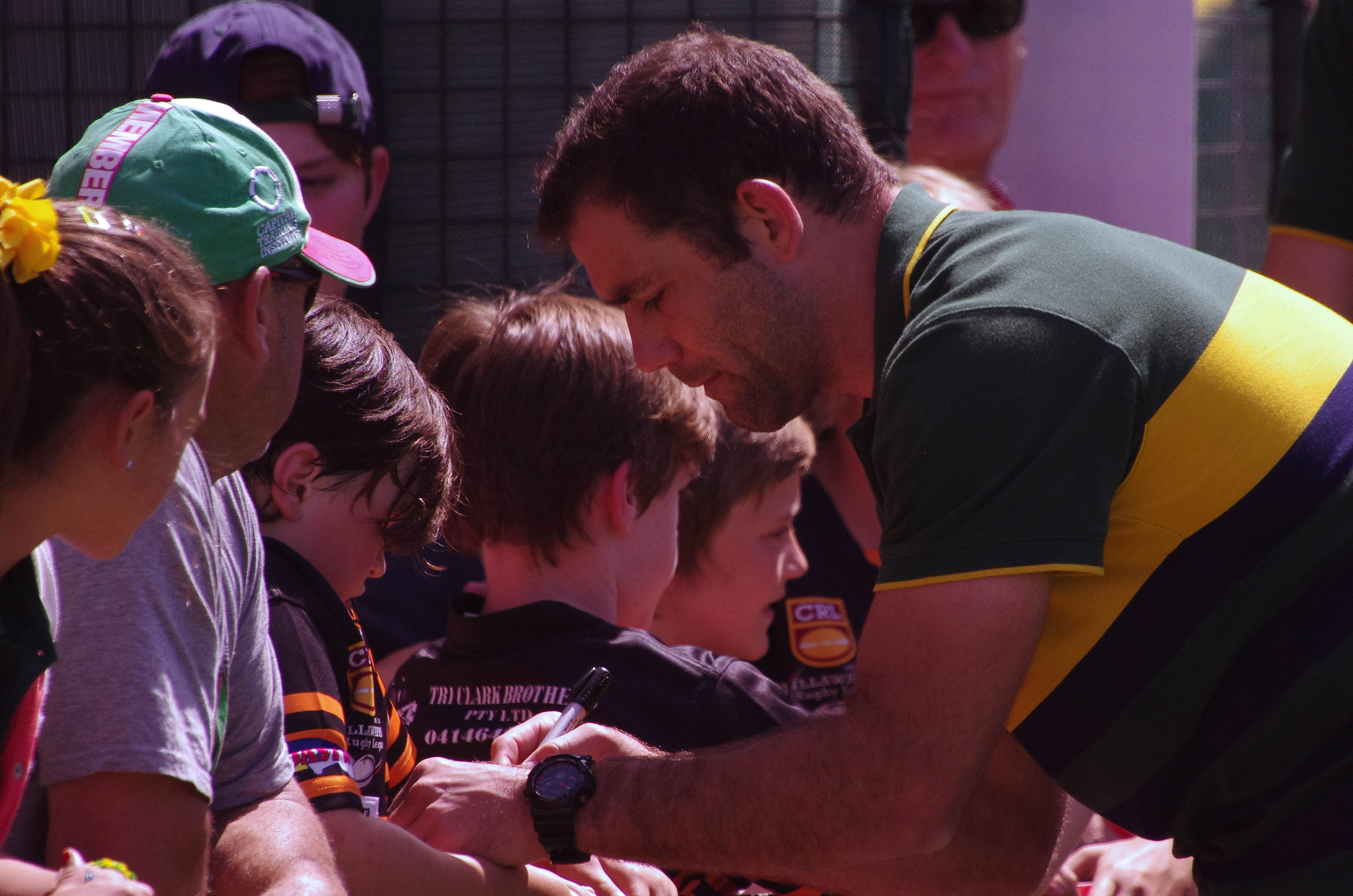
Smith representing Australia in 2014

†	Denotes years in which Smith won a World Cup Title
†	Denotes years in which Smith won a Four Nations Title

Season	Team	Matches	T	G	GK %	F/G	Pts	W	L	D	W-L %
2006	Australia	5	0	0	—	0	0	4	1	0	80.00
2007	Australia	2	1	6	60.00	0	16	2	0	0	100.00
2008	Australia	6	1	1	100.00	0	6	5	1	0	83.33
2009†	Australia	4	2	0	—	0	8	3	0	1	75.00
2010	Australia	5	1	15	71.42	0	34	4	1	0	80.00
2011†	Australia	6	1	1	100.00	0	6	6	0	0	100.00
2012	Australia	2	2	0	—	0	8	2	0	0	100.00
2013†	Australia	7	1	7	63.63	0	18	7	0	0	100.00
2014	Australia	5	0	11	78.57	0	22	3	2	0	60.00
2015	Australia	1	0	0	—	0	0	0	1	0	0.00
2016†	Australia	6	0	1	50.00	0	2	6	0	0	100.00
2017†	Australia	7	0	25	75.00	0	50	7	0	0	100.00
Career totals		56	9	67	72.04	0	170	49	6	1	87.50

== Personal life ==
Smith has three children with his long-term partner Barbara Johnson, whom he married in late 2011: two daughters and a son, he also supports the Hawthorn Football Club, and is an avid car enthusiast who is an ambassador for Holden Special Vehicles as well as an ambassador for the Ovarian Cancer Awareness campaign.

== Notes ==
Preceded by Darren Lockyer	Australia national rugby league team captain 2012–2018	Succeeded by Boyd Cordner
Preceded by Hazem El Masri; 2009	Record-holder; Most points in an NRL career 2019 (2,422)	Succeeded by current
