= Kevin Yow Yeh =

Australian rugby league footballer

Personal information
- Full name: Kevin Yow Yeh
- Born: 1941
- Died: 27 June 1975 (aged 33–34) Mackay Jail, Mackay, Queensland, Australia

Playing information
- Position: Wing
Club
Years	Team	Pld	T	G	FG	P
1964–65	Redcliffe Dolphins	0	0	0	0	0
1966–68	Balmain Tigers	41	9	0	0	27
	Total	41	9	0	0	27
- As of 30 June 2021
- Relatives: Jharal Yow Yeh (great nephew)

Kevin Yow Yeh (1941– 27 June 1975) was an Australian rugby league player for the Balmain Tigers in the New South Wales Rugby League premiership competition, his position of choice was on the wing. His great-nephew is retired Brisbane Broncos player Jharal Yow Yeh.

== Queensland career ==
Yow Yeh began his career in Gladstone, and played for the Redcliffe Dolphins. In 1964, Yow Yeh was named the Redcliffe club's player of the year and in 1965 Redcliffe defeated Valleys at Lang Park to win the Brisbane Rugby League grand final.

== Sydney career ==
He was then sold to the Balmain Tigers along with fellow Redcliffe and aboriginal player Arthur Beetson for a fee of about 1,500 pounds each. According to Beetson in his autobiography, Yow Yeh was of Aboriginal and South Sea Islander descent. His nickname was "Rab" or "Rabbie".

His highlight for Balmain came in his debut season when he appeared for them at centre in the 1966 NSWRFL season's grand final against the St. George Dragons, a game which they eventually lost. Kevin only played two seasons for the club and because he could never fully adjust to city life he left Balmain at the end of the 1967 NSWRFL season to return home. He will be remembered for being involved in a great covering tackle by Canterbury fullback Les Johns at the Sydney Sports Ground also in 1966.

== Later life and death ==
Arthur Beetson wrote of Yow Yeh: "he couldn't live with the white man, a hatred inspired by the attitudes of some. It virtually killed him". Yow Yeh's suffering manifested itself in alcoholism. He died in the watchhouse at Mackay Jail on 27 June 1975, supposedly of a heart attack. Beetson has "always been suspicious" about the circumstances and considers it "another Aboriginal death in custody" where the true real story will never be revealed.

In a stunning revelation, former Aboriginal and Torres Strait Islander legal aid officer Tony Irelandes has told the Queensland Times that the 34-year-old Yow Yeh died in front of his eyes of a heart attack on June 27, 1975 in the Mackay watchhouse.

This confirms the argument put forward by Goodna historian Lyle Reed in his book 'Inquest' that Yow Yeh, a flying outside back with Redcliffe and Balmain, had a congenital heart problem and did not die at the hands of police.
