= 2012 NRL Grand Final =

Australian rugby league match

Canterbury-Bankstown Bulldogs	Melbourne Storm
4	14
	1	2	Total
CBY	4	0	4
MEL	14	0	14
- Date: 30 September 2012
- Stadium: ANZ Stadium
- Location: Sydney
- Clive Churchill Medal: Cooper Cronk (MEL)
- Australian National anthem: Sarah De Bono
- Referee: Tony Archer; Ben Cummins; Paul Holland (Touch Judge); Russell Turner (Touch Judge)
- Attendance: 82,976

Broadcast partners
- Broadcasters: Nine Network
- Commentators: Ray Warren; Peter Sterling; Phil Gould; Andrew Johns; Wally Lewis

The 2012 NRL Grand Final was the conclusive and premiership-deciding game of the 2012 NRL season. Played on Sunday, 30 September at Sydney's ANZ Stadium between the minor premiers Canterbury-Bankstown Bulldogs and the second-placed Melbourne Storm. Melbourne won the match 14–4 in a tight contest to claim their second premiership title after their 2007 and 2009 titles were stripped due to major salary cap breaches.

== Background ==
This was the fourth time the Canterbury Bankstown Bulldogs and Melbourne Storm have faced each other in a finals series and the first in a grand final. It was the fifth time in the past seven seasons the Melbourne Storm featured in a grand final, although they were playing for their second official title. The Canterbury side played in their first decider since 2004 when they defeated the Sydney Roosters to win their last premiership. It was also the third time coaches Craig Bellamy and Des Hasler oversaw their sides in a premiership decider after each claimed grand final success in their 2007 and 2008 meetings.

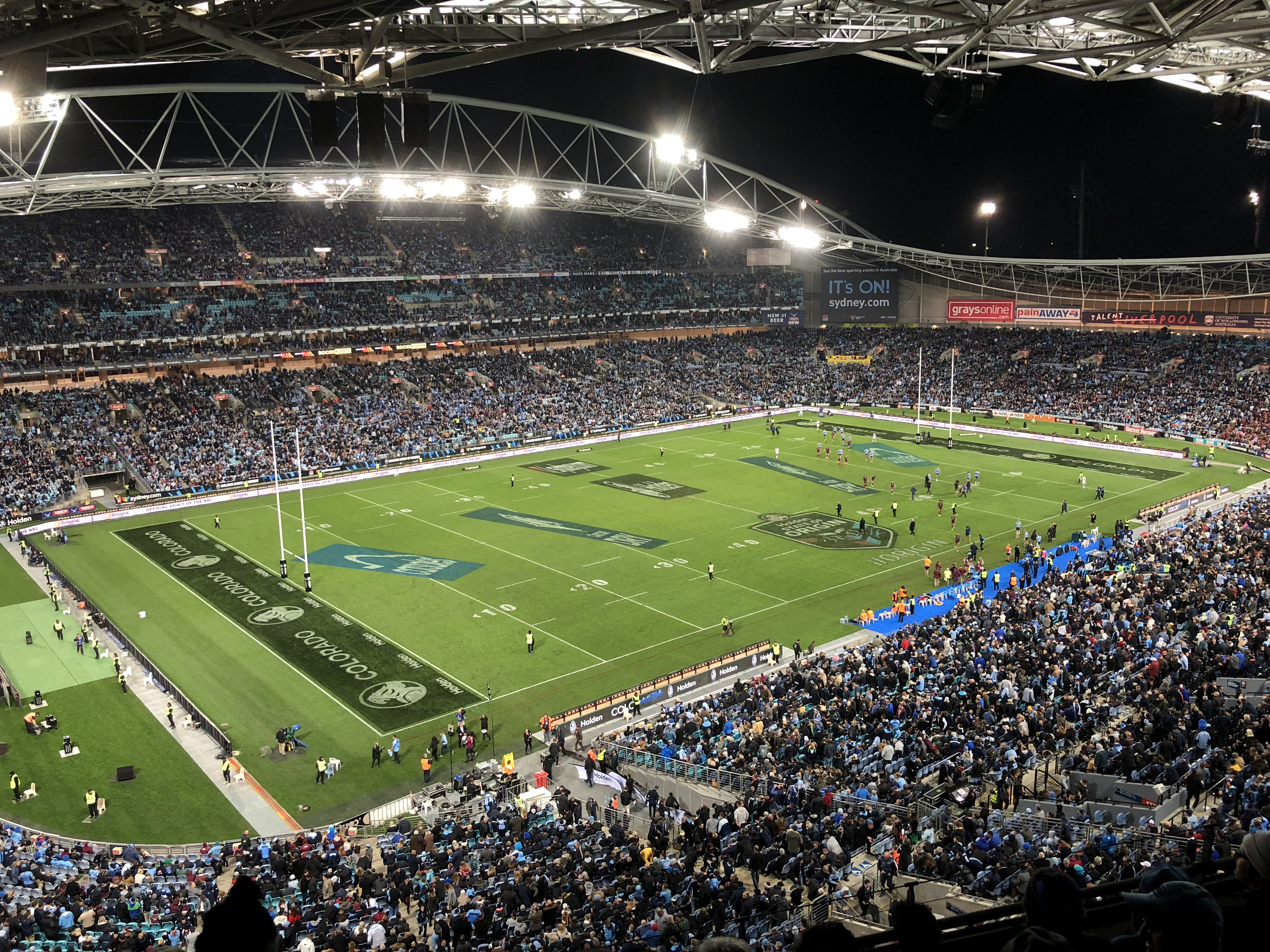
ANZ Stadium, where the match was played

	Bulldogs	Storm
Rd.1	Panthers	Raiders
Rd.2	Dragons	Rabbitohs
Rd.3	Warriors	Titans
Rd.4	Knights	Roosters
Rd.5	Titans	Knights
Rd.6	Rabbitohs	Cowboys
Rd.7	Storm	Bulldogs
Rd.8	Sea Eagles	Warriors
Rd.9	Eels	Panthers
Rd.10	Titans	Sharks
Rd.11	Sharks	Bye
Rd.12	Roosters	Broncos
Rd.13	Rabbitohs	Warriors
Rd.14	Bye	Tigers
Rd.15	Dragons	Sea Eagles
Rd.16	Storm	Bulldogs
Rd.17	Bye	Bye
Rd.18	Tigers	Raiders
Rd.19	Eels	Cowboys
Rd.20	Sea Eagles	Eels
Rd.21	Cowboys	Dragons
Rd.22	Knights	Panthers
Rd.23	Broncos	Titans
Rd.24	Tigers	Broncos
Rd.25	Raiders	Sharks
Rd.26	Roosters	Tigers
QF	Sea Eagles	Rabbitohs
SF	DNP	DNP
PF	Rabbitohs	Sea Eagles
GF	Storm	Bulldogs
Legend: Win Loss

Melbourne and Canterbury have faced each other twice in the regular season, with the Melbourne side beating Canterbury-Bankstown 12–6 in a tight match at Melbourne's home ground in AAMI Park in round 7 whilst Canterbury got over Melbourne later in round 16 with a score of 20–4 at Canterbury's non-traditional venue at Virgin Australia Stadium in Mackay, Queensland.

Tickets to the grand final were sold out by 22 August, more than two weeks before finals playoffs begun.

=== Canterbury-Bankstown Bulldogs ===
The Canterbury-Bankstown Bulldogs finished first on the regular season competition ladder, claiming the 2012 minor premiership with 18 wins from 24 matches and finishing on 40 premiership points. This was the club's 7th minor premiership in its history and its first since 1994. Canterbury's 2012 season was characterised by a 12-game winning streak from round 11 to round 24, which was eventually ended after a 34–6 defeat to the Canberra Raiders in round 25. This loss gave Melbourne a chance to claim the minor premiership, however a 42–10 win over the Sydney Roosters in round 26 ensured the Canterbury club finished first.

The Canterbury side began the 2012 finals series with a 16–10 win over the Manly-Warringah Sea Eagles to ensure a preliminary final berth in week 3. They subsequently won this match 32–8 against the South Sydney Rabbitohs to qualify for the 2012 grand final against Melbourne.

This was Canterbury's 17th grand final appearance and the club's first since 2004.

=== Melbourne Storm ===
The Melbourne Storm finished second on the regular season competition leader just behind Canterbury-Bankstown on 38 premiership points, with 17 wins from 24 games. Melbourne's 2012 season was characterised by a 9-game winning streak from round 1 to round 9, making them early premiership favourites. The Melbourne club subsequently suffered a 5-game losing streak from round 16 to round 21, allowing Canterbury to overtake them to win the minor premiership. Despite this, the Melbourne club finished the season winning their last 5 consecutive matches to finish second.

Melbourne began week 1 of the finals with a 24–6 victory over the South Sydney Rabbitohs to qualify for a preliminary final in week 3 against modern rivals the Manly-Warringah Sea Eagles. Melbourne won this match 40–12 to qualify for the 2012 NRL Grand Final against Canterbury-Bankstown.

This was the Melbourne club's fifth grand final appearance in seven seasons and its sixth appearance overall.

== Team lists ==
Canterbury-Bankstown Bulldogs	Position	Melbourne Storm
Ben Barba	Fullback	Billy Slater
Sam Perrett	Wing	Sisa Waqa
Josh Morris	Centre	Dane Nielsen
Krisnan Inu	Centre	Will Chambers
Jonathan Wright	Wing	Justin O'Neill
Josh Reynolds	Five-eighth	Gareth Widdop
Kris Keating	Halfback	Cooper Cronk
Aiden Tolman	Prop	Jesse Bromwich
Michael Ennis (c)	Hooker	Cameron Smith (c)
Sam Kasiano	Prop	Bryan Norrie
Frank Pritchard	2nd Row	Kevin Proctor
Josh Jackson	2nd Row	Ryan Hoffman
Greg Eastwood	Lock	Todd Lowrie
James Graham	Interchange	Sika Manu
Dale Finucane	Interchange	Ryan Hinchcliffe
Corey Payne	Interchange	Jaiman Lowe
David Stagg	Interchange	Richie Fa'aoso
Des Hasler	Coach	Craig Bellamy

Note: Kevin Proctor swapped with Sika Manu from his interchange spot before the match.

== Match details ==
2012 NRL Grand Final

Sunday, 30 September
17:00 AEST (UTC+10)

Canterbury-Bankstown Bulldogs	4 – 14	Melbourne Storm
Tries: 1 Perrett 25'; Goals: Inu (0/1)	1st: 4–14; 2nd: 0–0; Report	Tries: 3 Hoffman 7'; Slater 32'; O'Neill 39'; Goals: 1 Smith 32' (1/3)

ANZ Stadium, Sydney
Attendance: 82,976
Referees: Tony Archer, Ben Cummins
Clive Churchill Medal: Cooper Cronk (Melbourne)

=== 1st half ===
Melbourne began the first half with all the early possession, punishing a number of errors by Canterbury-Bankstown with several repeat sets. The relentless pressure was rewarded with a 7th minute try to Ryan Hoffman, bursting through a yawning gap after taking Gareth Widdop's lovely short ball 10m out from the line to make it 4–0. Melbourne captain Cameron Smith missed the conversion. Melbourne continued to pressure Canterbury's try line over the next few minutes but they held strong, forcing Melbourne to attempt a penalty conversion which was missed by Smith.

The Canterbury side took this as a sign of respect to their brutal defense and went on the attack, resulting in a 25th minute try to Sam Perrett, who beat Melbourne fullback Billy Slater to Krisnan Inu's perfectly placed grubber kick. As Perrett dived over, Slater accidentally barged into him in his attempts to stop the try. Inu, reacting to what he thought was an illegal play by Slater, pushed Melbourne fullback away, sparking an all in brawl which led to one of the biggest controversies in Grand Final history. Once the fight was broken up, Slater claimed that he was bitten on the ear by Canterbury prop James Graham. Video showed the fullback had blood coming from his ear and replays confirmed the allegations, clearly showing Graham biting Slater's ear. Referee Tony Archer placed the incident on report and it was referred straight to the judiciary; Graham later received a 12 match ban. The try was awarded to Perrett, however, Inu missed the conversion and the score was locked at 4-4.

Melbourne used the controversial incident to spur them on, relaying the pressure on Canterbury. They capitalized in the 32nd minute where Melbourne halfback Cooper Cronk delivering a sublime no look pass to Slater as he burst through a gap beating two defenders to cross for Melbourne, taking the score out to 10-4 after Smith's conversion. Melbourne were not done just yet, as they delivered the knockout blow a minute before halftime where Cronk supplied a pinpoint cross field bomb to Justin O’Neil who leapt over Canterbury fullback Ben Barba to score Melbourne's third try. Smith missed the conversion once more and Melbourne led 14–4 at halftime.

=== 2nd half ===
The second half was a defensive slog. Melbourne didn't touch the ball in the opening 10 minutes, holding out set after set of Canterbury's attack. Canterbury captain Michael Ennis seemed to have scored in the 49th minute only to be denied by Cameron Smith holding him up. Melbourne went down the other end and Smith missed another penalty conversion, failing in his attempts to make it a two converted try lead. The closest the Canterbury side came to scoring was in the 61st minute where Barba made a break down the left hand wing, kicked over the top to centre Josh Morris, who failed to capitalise due to the bounce of the ball and Slater's desperate defending. Melbourne prop Brian Norrie appeared to have scored a try in the 70th minute, diving over after Slater batted back Cronk's bomb, however it was to be denied as Norrie was offside. Melbourne held on to win the Grand Final 14–4. Melbourne halfback Cooper Cronk was awarded the Clive Churchill Medal for his man of the match performance.

The crowd of 82,976 was the highest Grand Final attendance at ANZ Stadium ever since it was re-constructed in 2002 and it was the first Grand Final to have a scoreless half of play. Melbourne's 2012 triumph was their 2nd legitimate title. The result also saw Melbourne coach Craig Bellamy take home his first valid championship.

== Aftermath ==
The Melbourne Storm's premiership victory qualified them to compete against the Super League XVII champions, Leeds Rhinos in the 2013 World Club Challenge.
