= Jharal Yow Yeh =

Australia international rugby league footballer

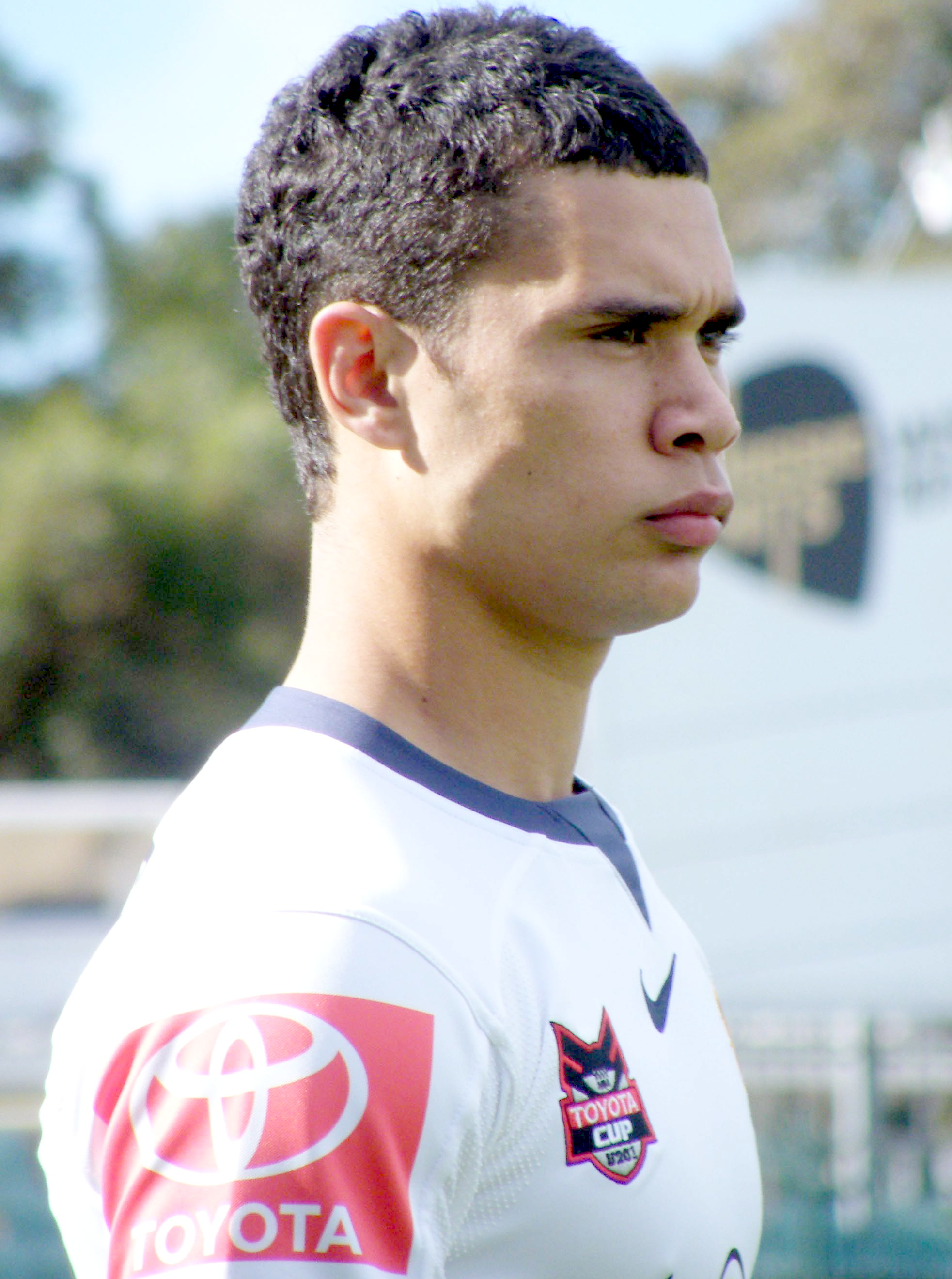

Personal information
- Born: 22 December 1989 (age 36) Brisbane, Queensland, Australia

Playing information
- Height: 187 cm (6 ft 2 in)
- Weight: 96 kg (15 st 2 lb)
- Position: Wing
Club
Years	Team	Pld	T	G	FG	P
2009–14	Brisbane Broncos	60	33	0	0	132
Representative
Years	Team	Pld	T	G	FG	P
2011	Australia	3	3	0	0	12
2011	Queensland	3	2	0	0	8
2010–12	Indigenous All Stars	3	1	0	0	4
- Source: Rugby League Project
- Education: Ferny Grove State High School
- Relatives: Kevin Yow Yeh (great uncle)

Jharal Yow Yeh (born 22 December 1989) is an Australian radio presenter and former professional rugby league footballer who played for the Brisbane Broncos in the NRL. An Australian international and Queensland State of Origin representative wing or centre, he also played for the Indigenous All Stars. Yow Yeh spent his entire club career with the Broncos, which was cut short due to a bad leg break and complications.

== Background ==
Yow Yeh was born in Brisbane, Queensland, to Rhonda Yow Yeh; Yow Yeh is an Aboriginal Australian of the Margany tribe and is also of part Chinese and Ni-Vanuatu descent. His surname is Mandarin; his great-great-grandfather was Chinese and lived in Vanuatu. Yow Yeh is related to former Balmain Tigers player Kevin Yow Yeh, who died before Jharal was born. While Kevin Yow Yeh has often been reported as Jharal's great-uncle, he was actually Jharal's grandfather's first cousin; the family describes their relationship as "third cousins".

Yow Yeh attended Ferny Grove State High School, where he finished his senior education in 2006. In 2007, Yow Yeh was in The Parramatta Eels junior system and played there for one season but then had his scholarship torn up and was told by then Parramatta recruitment chief Rod Reddy that he would never make first grade and would not be able to cut it. When reflecting back on the moment he was told the news Yow Yeh said "Parramatta told me that I wouldn't be able to cut it and I thought that was it, I had no idea what I was going to do". After graduating from school Yow Yeh played junior football for West Arana Hills and Norths Devils. He played in the Under-20s for the Brisbane Broncos and was named in the 2008 National Youth Competition's team of the year.

== Playing career ==
Yow Yeh made his National Rugby League debut for the Brisbane Broncos at Suncorp Stadium in the 2009 NRL season's Round 1 clash with the North Queensland Cowboys.

Yow Yeh was named to the Indigenous All Stars team in 2010, during which season he injured his leg, missing five rounds. The same year he was named to the Queensland rugby league team for Game II of the 2010 State of Origin series, but was not needed to play. He saw playing time for Queensland in the 2011 State of Origin series, scoring his first State of Origin try in his Game I debut. The same year he was named to the Australian national team, filling in for injured wingers Lote Tuqiri and Darius Boyd.

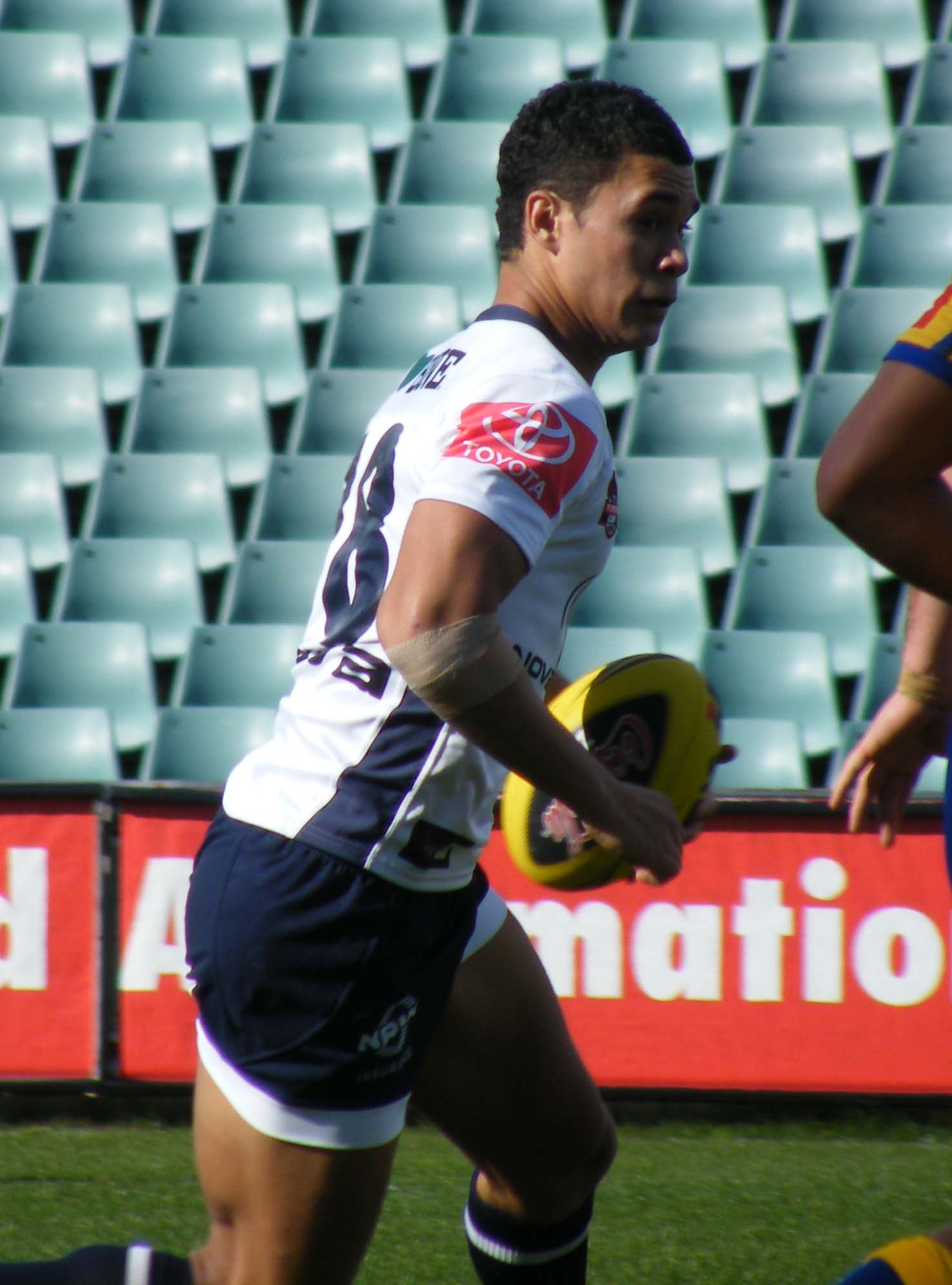
Yow Yeh playing in the Toyota Cup in 2009

On 3 November 2011, Yow Yeh was named international rookie of the year at the annual RLIF Awards dinner at the Tower of London.

Yow Yeh featured in the 2012 NRL All Stars Game as the right winger for the Indigenous All Stars team. Yow Yeh started strong in the 2012 NRL season, scoring a crucial try in the second half against the Parramatta Eels, the Broncos winning 18–6. In round 4 against the South Sydney Rabbitohs of the 2012 NRL season, Yow Yeh suffered compound fracture of the lower right leg. Down 12–0 at the time of his injury, the Broncos went on to win 20–12. However Yow Yeh's 2012 season was over with a serious injury described as "motorbike-like". On 28 April 2013, Yow Yeh returned to rugby league, playing second row for the Norths Devils.

Yow Yeh announced, in March 2014, that he would retire from the game after failing to fully recover from the leg injury he suffered in 2012.

== Post Playing ==
Post retirement from the NRL, Yow Yeh worked behind the scenes at the Broncos in a community role. Yow Yeh is also a host on Triple A Murri and works closely with Bloke in a Bar. Yow Yeh also revealed after retiring that he struggled with a pain killer addiction and bouts of depression as he was recovering from his ankle injury, he managed to overcome the need for medication and became the Broncos Indigenous Support Officer.

== Statistics ==
Season	Team	Pld	T	G	FG	Pts
2009	Brisbane Broncos	14	9	–	–	36
2010	Brisbane Broncos	19	8	–	–	32
2011	Brisbane Broncos	23	14	–	–	56
2012	Brisbane Broncos	4	2	–	–	8
	Total	60	33	-	-	132
