= 2013 State of Origin series =

Australian rugby league series

- Won by: Queensland (18th title)
- Series margin: 2-1
- Points scored: 44-30
- Attendance: 215,883 (ave. 71,961 per match)
- Player of the series: Cameron Smith
- Top points scorer(s): Johnathan Thurston – 18
- Top try scorer(s): Darius Boyd – 3

The 2013 State of Origin series was the 32nd time the annual best-of-three series between the Queensland and New South Wales rugby league teams was played entirely under 'state of origin' rules. It was the first series to be administered by the Australian Rugby League Commission which was created in a major re-structure of the sport's administration in Australia.

Queensland were to host two home matches this year; however, the ARLC Commission announced in November 2012 a new five-year cycle which would see New South Wales instead host two home matches this year, as well as in 2016, the Maroons to host two home matches in 2014 and 2017 and the remaining match in 2015 to be hosted at a neutral venue.

Former Canberra, Queensland and Australian captain Mal Meninga continued on as coach of the Queensland side, looking to continue his winning run having won the previous seven series. New South Wales was coached by former Canberra, NSW and Australia captain Laurie Daley, who took over from yet another former Canberra, NSW and Australia teammate Ricky Stuart who moved on from State of Origin duty following the 2012 series to coach Parramatta.

Queensland won the State of Origin series by winning two of the three matches, thus stretching their record-breaking State of Origin winning streak to eight years and thus defending their shield. Cameron Smith won the Wally Lewis Medal for being the best player in the series.

The 2013 series set a new State of Origin television ratings record for a whole series since the 2001 introduction of the ratings system.

== Game I ==
Like both of his predecessor as New South Wales coach Craig Bellamy and Ricky Stuart, Laurie Daley was brought in to coach against Mal Meninga, who captained Canberra to their premiership in 1990 NSWRL season when all three played under him. The Blues team to play in the opening game for the 2013 series saw a host of changes from the incumbent side from game three last year. Four debutants were selected by Daley to join the squad: Blake Ferguson, James Maloney, Andrew Fifita and Josh Reynolds. Current Sydney Roosters and former New Zealand Warriors five-eighth Maloney replaced Todd Carney to partner Mitchell Pearce in the halves, keeping with the same halves partnership for the Roosters so far in the 2013 NRL season and continuing the trend where no incumbent NSW five-eighth since 2000-2001 has gone on to play in the first game of the following series. Ferguson, who usually plays centre for his club and in other representative matches, made his debut on the right wing whilst Cronulla forward Fifita earned his spot on the interchange. Reynolds joined the squad late in preparation after winning an audition between him and Rabbitohs player John Sutton, who were selected by Daley to fill the vacant interchange spot left by Kurt Gidley after he withdrew from the squad due to injury shortly after the team was announced.

Other major changes to the NSW team included Jarryd Hayne moving from the wing to replace the injured Brett Stewart at fullback. Captain Paul Gallen moved back into the front-row making way for Ryan Hoffman to return to the Blues squad for the first time since 2008.

Wednesday, June 5, 2013
20:00

New South Wales	14 – 6	Queensland
Tries: Hayne (5') 1 Jennings (37') 1 Goals: Maloney 3/4 (7', 19' pen, 38')	Report; Details	Tries: 1 (61') Boyd Goals: 1/1 (63') Smith

ANZ Stadium, Sydney
Attendance: 80,380
Referee: Shayne Hayne, Ashley Klein
Player of the Match: Luke Lewis

The Blues started off strongly in Game 1 with a try to Jarryd Hayne in the 5th minute seeing them 6-0 in front. Subsequent penalties saw the Blues extend the lead to 8-0 after Maloney kicked a penalty goal in the 19th minute. Jennings pounced on a loose ball that came from a repeat set and scored under the posts after ploughing through 5 defenders. This saw the Blues with a 14-0 lead at the break. Queensland came up with several opportunities to score in the first half including Boyd almost crossing in the corner, however the Blues defence came rushing in every time to defuse any chance.

Tempers flared seconds from half time when Gallen landed two punches at Myles sending him on report.

Darius Boyd scored in the corner for Queensland in the 61st minute making the score 14-6. This would be the final result in the game with all the points being scored on the southern end of the field.

After the match due to criticism of the match officials for not sending Paul Gallen to the sin bin but placing him on report for punching Nate Myles the NRL introduced an automatic sin bin for anyone throwing a punch.

== Game II ==
The announced Maroons squad for game two saw significant changes to their forward pack and interchange. Long time Queensland campaigners prop forward David Shillington and lock Ashley Harrison were dropped in favor of Nate Myles and Corey Parker respectively, whilst Chris McQueen was promoted from the bench to fill Myles' second row spot. Manly Sea Eagles halfback Daly Cherry-Evans and Canberra Raiders second rower Josh Papalii made their debuts on the bench after both were standing reserves for the first match.

There were minimal changes for the Blues squad in the second game in the series. Josh Dugan, who earlier in the season was sacked from the Canberra Raiders for repeated off field disciplinary issues then subsequently signed for the St George Illawarra Dragons almost two months later, took up the fullback spot due to Jarryd Hayne succumbing to a club game injury whilst Brett Stewart remained unavailable for selection. Wests Tigers prop forward Aaron Woods replaced James Tamou in the front row who was suspended from the match after he was charged with high-range drink driving. Winger Blake Ferguson was also stood down from the squad shortly after he was announced in consequence of a publicized off field drama where he was charged with indecent assault. Ferguson's replacement was Nathan Merritt who made his debut at age 30. The match also happened to coincide with the Change in Prime Minister of Australia, most notably delaying the start of the match by 15 minutes. This led to the pre-match entertainment of the Stafford Brothers to be extended by 10 minutes.

Wednesday, June 26, 2013
20:00

Queensland	26 – 6	New South Wales
Tries; Boyd (17', 48') 2 Thaiday (2') 1 Inglis (56') 1 Goals; Thurston 5/6 (4', 9' pen, 19', 57', 80' pen)	Report; Details	Tries; 1 (70') B Morris; Goals; 1/1 (71') Maloney

Suncorp Stadium, Brisbane
Attendance: 51,690
Referee: Shayne Hayne, Ashley Klein
Player of the Match: Cameron Smith

In the second half, after a fight broke out in the ruck four players were sin-binned: Queensland's Brent Tate and Justin Hodges, and New South Wales' Trent Merrin and Greg Bird. This ruling was roundly criticized by former State of Origin greats in post-game analysis.

== Game III ==
New South Wales captain Paul Gallen was unable to recover from a sustained injury and was subsequently ruled out of the series decider. James Tamou returned from disciplinary suspension to rejoin the front-row and replace Gallen, whilst Robbie Farah was handed the captaincy role. Other changes saw James McManus and Boyd Cordner replace Nathan Merritt on the wing and Josh Reynolds on the bench, respectively. Fullback Jarryd Hayne was once again ruled out due to an ongoing hamstring injury. No changes in game three were made for Queensland.

Wednesday, July 17, 2013
20:00

New South Wales	10 – 12	Queensland
Tries; McManus (25') 1 Merrin (71') 1 Goals; Maloney 1/2 (72')	Report; Details	Tries; 1 (10') Thurston; 1 (61') Hodges; Goals; 2/3 (11', 14' pen) Thurston

ANZ Stadium, Sydney
Attendance: 83,813
Referee: Shayne Hayne, Ben Cummins
Player of the Match: Brent Tate

Queensland extended their record to eight consecutive series in a decider that featured a streaker, and the post-Olympics attendance record for Stadium Australia. The attendance of 83,813 beat the previous record of 83,702 set just 10 days earlier for a rugby union Test between Australia and the British & Irish Lions. Unlike in the first two games, the decider was closely contested in the first half with both sides getting across the line inside the first half-hour. In the 10th minute, Johnathan Thurston weaved his way through some lazy Blues defence after a shift to the left broke down, to score next to the posts. He converted his own try to give the Maroons a 6-0 lead. The ensuing set resulted in Thurston adding another 2 points after James Maloney was penalised for a shoulder charge on the kicker Cooper Cronk. QLD lead 8-0 after 15 minutes. The Blues hit back in the 25th minute after consecutive penalties and some clever work by Josh Morris saw James McManus score in the corner. The conversion by James Maloney was unsuccessful leaving the score at 8-4 and that's how it remained at half time, with Queensland producing some desperate defence to prevent NSW from scoring.

Both sides started the second half in a rather pensive mood before NSW seemed to gain the ascendancy in field position and general flow of the match. That changed at the 60 minute mark after repeated errors by the Blues lead to QLD receiving their first penalty in over 40 minutes. The Maroons capitalised on this opportunity with Justin Hodges scoring off a deft short ball from Cooper Cronk. Johnathan Thurston missed the sideline conversion keeping the scores at 12-4. With just over 10 minutes to go Trent Merrin steadied some disorganised play by straightening and barging through a terrible attempted tackle by Corey Parker, to score right under the sticks. James Maloney made no mistake with the conversion taking the score to 12-10. The Blues looked to go on the attack from the ensuing restart, gaining 60m in 4 plays before a badly misdirected pass from Mitchell Pearce ricocheted off Josh Dugan's shoulder and cost the Blues 15m. James Maloney ended up hoisting the ball into the heavens which Billy Slater climbed high to mark with Ryan Hoffman and Andrew Fifita giving away a penalty for tackling him in the air. The Maroons proceeded cautiously with only 5 minutes left on the clock. Realising the shortage of time, Robbie Farah attempted to kick for a 40/20 to give the Blues one last crack at QLD's line but came up short. Darius Boyd returned the kick in fantastic fashion making a 40m run leaving several NSW chasers in his wake. Cameron Smith then ducked down a short side making a break before passing to Corey Parker who in-turn offloaded the ball back to his captain who made a determined charge for the NSW line only to be brought down inches short. With the Blues shot defensively, QLD looked to shift the ball before a streaker who by then had run 80m to get in the way of play tripped over and fell right amongst the players. QLD ended up getting across the line through Matt Scott but was disallowed the try because of the interference to play. The resulting decision, a neutral infringement, afforded QLD a scrum with the loose head and feed given their superior field position. It ended with James Maloney taking a superb reflex catch of a Johnathan Thurston kick. The ball came out to the Blues captain Farah who then went for the all or nothing kick across field which James McManus was unable to take, knocking the ball into touch. QLD retained their shield and extended their dynasty to 8 straight Origin series victories. Cameron Smith was awarded the Wally Lewis medal for player of the series.

== Teams ==
The 18th and 19th man are reserves to cover for any forthcoming injuries and, unless chosen, do not actually play.

=== New South Wales Blues ===
Position	Game 1	Game 2	Game 3
Fullback	Jarryd Hayne	Josh Dugan	
Wing	Brett Morris		
Centre	Michael Jennings		
Centre	Josh Morris		
Wing	Blake Ferguson	Nathan Merritt ^{1}	James McManus
Five-Eighth	James Maloney		
Halfback	Mitchell Pearce		
Prop	Paul Gallen (c)		Aaron Woods ^{2}
Hooker	Robbie Farah		Robbie Farah (c) ^{2}
Prop	James Tamou	Aaron Woods	James Tamou
Second Row	Luke Lewis		
Second Row	Ryan Hoffman		
Lock	Greg Bird		
Interchange	Andrew Fifita		
Interchange	Trent Merrin		
Interchange	Josh Reynolds ^{3}		Boyd Cordner
Interchange	Anthony Watmough		
Coach	Laurie Daley		
18th Man	John Sutton		Josh Reynolds

1 - Blake Ferguson was originally selected to play in game two but was withdrawn after being suspended by the NRL. He was replaced by Nathan Merritt.
2 - Paul Gallen was originally selected to play in game three but withdrew due to injury. He was replaced by Aaron Woods as prop, and Robbie Farah as captain.
3 - Kurt Gidley was originally selected to play in game one but withdrew due to injury. He was replaced by Josh Reynolds.

=== Queensland Maroons ===
Position	Game 1	Game 2	Game 3
Fullback	Billy Slater		
Wing	Darius Boyd		
Centre	Greg Inglis		
Centre	Justin Hodges		
Wing	Brent Tate		
Five-Eighth	Johnathan Thurston		
Halfback	Cooper Cronk		
Prop	Matt Scott		
Hooker	Cameron Smith (c)		
Prop	David Shillington	Nate Myles	
Second row	Nate Myles	Chris McQueen	
Second row	Sam Thaiday		
Lock	Ashley Harrison	Corey Parker	
Interchange	Corey Parker	Daly Cherry-Evans	
Interchange	Matt Gillett		
Interchange	Ben Te'o		
Interchange	Chris McQueen	Josh Papalii	
Coach	Mal Meninga		
18th Man	Daly Cherry-Evans	Jacob Lillyman^{1}	
19th Man	Josh Papalii		Will Chambers

1 - Martin Kennedy was originally selected as 18th man in game two but withdrew due to injury. He was replaced by Jacob Lillyman.

== Under-20s ==
New South Wales retained the Darren Lockyer Shield.

April 20, 2013
18:00

New South Wales	36 – 12	Queensland
Tries; Cornish 2 Runciman 2 Jennings 2 Lichaa 1 Goals; Walker 4/7	Report	Tries; Tago 1 Milford 1 Goals; Milford 2/2

Centerbet Stadium, Sydney
Referee: Grant Atkins and Peter Gough
Player of the Match: David Klemmer

== Women's State of Origin ==
2 May 2013
18:00 (Local)

New South Wales	14 - 4	Queensland

Centrebet Stadium, Penrith
