= Michael Ennis =

Australian rugby league footballer, coach

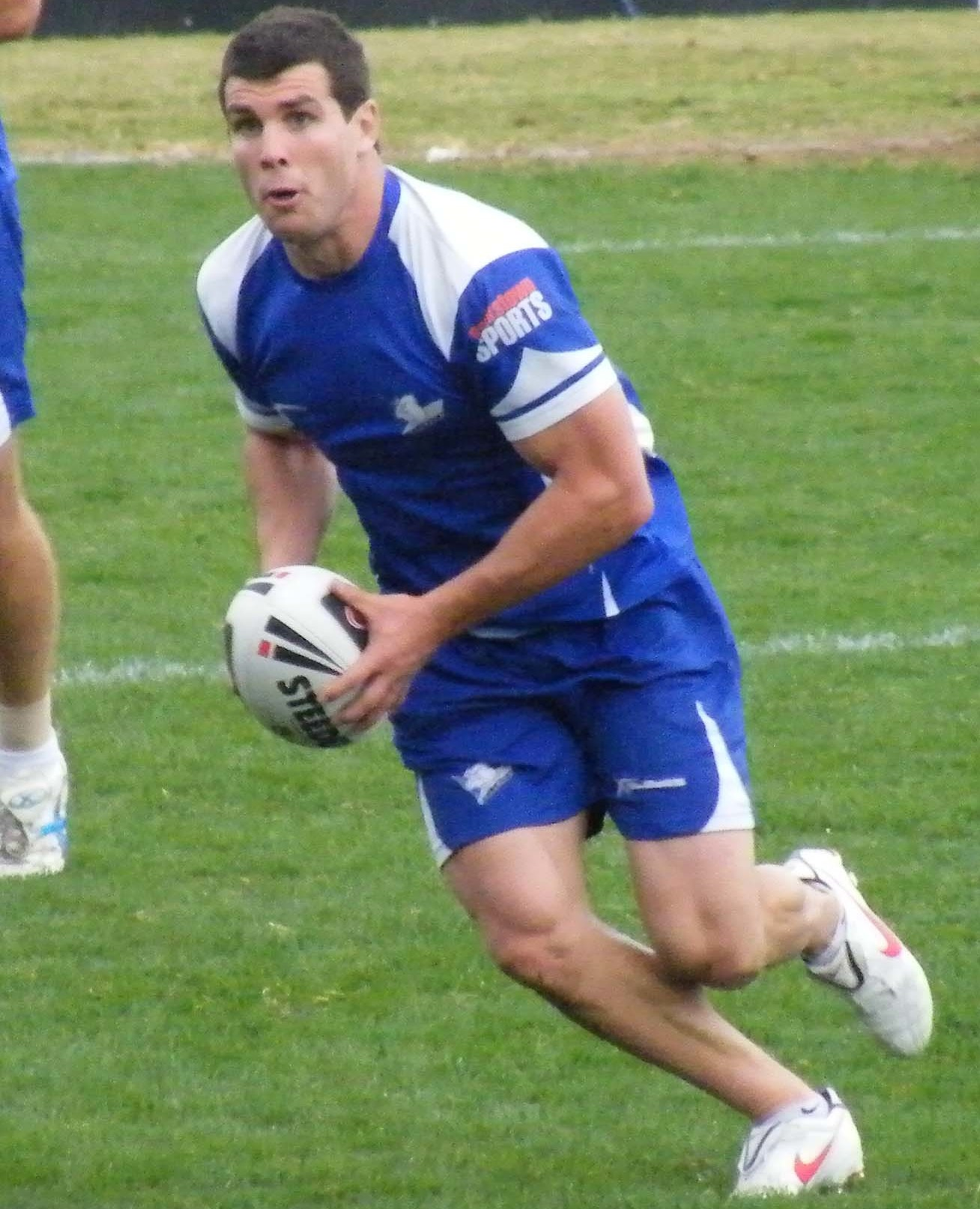

Personal information
- Full name: Michael Ennis
- Born: 16 March 1984 (age 42) Coffs Harbour, New South Wales, Australia

Playing information
- Height: 179 cm (5 ft 10 in)
- Weight: 87 kg (13 st 10 lb)
- Position: Hooker
Club
Years	Team	Pld	T	G	FG	P
2003–04	Newcastle Knights	20	2	0	0	8
2005	St. George Illawarra	24	5	44	0	108
2006–08	Brisbane Broncos	43	8	63	0	158
2009–14	Canterbury Bulldogs	136	17	2	1	73
2015–16	Cronulla Sharks	51	5	1	0	22
	Total	274	37	110	1	369
Representative
Years	Team	Pld	T	G	FG	P
2009–13	NSW Country	3	0	0	0	0
2009–15	New South Wales	8	0	4	0	8

Michael Ennis (born 16 March 1984) is an Australian sports commentator for Fox League and former professional rugby league footballer. A New South Wales State of Origin representative hooker, he played for the Canterbury-Bankstown Bulldogs, Brisbane Broncos, St George Illawarra Dragons, Newcastle Knights and the Cronulla-Sutherland Sharks, with whom he won the 2016 NRL premiership.

== Playing career ==
=== Newcastle Knights ===
Ennis made his NRL debut for Newcastle in 2003. After a single game in 2003 he played 19 games during the 2004 NRL season for the Knights.

=== St. George Illawarra Dragons ===
In the 2005 NRL season's finals series Ennis was kicking goals for the St. George Illawarra Dragons as they went to within one match of the grand final but lost to eventual premiers, the Wests Tigers.

=== Brisbane Broncos ===
Ennis playing for the Broncos in 2008

Ennis's first season at the Brisbane club, in 2006, was cut short by a knee injury suffered in round 5 against the South Sydney Rabbitohs at Suncorp Stadium. While changing direction, Ennis snapped his anterior cruciate ligament and required a full knee reconstruction. Ennis missed the rest of the season, and subsequently, the premiership win in October. As 2006 NRL Premiers, the Brisbane Broncos travelled to England to face 2006 Super League champions, St Helens R.F.C. in the 2007 World Club Challenge. Ennis played from the interchange bench in the Broncos' 14–18 loss.

In the 2007 NRL season, Ennis made a return to first grade but was forced to work for his place in the side as a result of the good form of Shaun Berrigan at hooker. After some appearances from the interchange bench earlier in the season, Ennis was trialled at halfback during the final stages of Brisbane's round 10 loss to the Manly-Warringah Sea Eagles. He was retained in this position in the ensuing games with some success.

The 2008 NRL season saw Ennis reach the best form of his time at the Brisbane club. With stiff competition from recruit PJ Marsh, Ennis cemented a spot as the starting hooker and guided the Broncos to some impressive early victories.

In June 2008, Ennis signed a three-year deal to join Canterbury-Bankstown in 2009, joining a list of players to leave the Broncos. This was to be his 4th NRL club at 24 years of age.

=== Canterbury-Bankstown Bulldogs ===
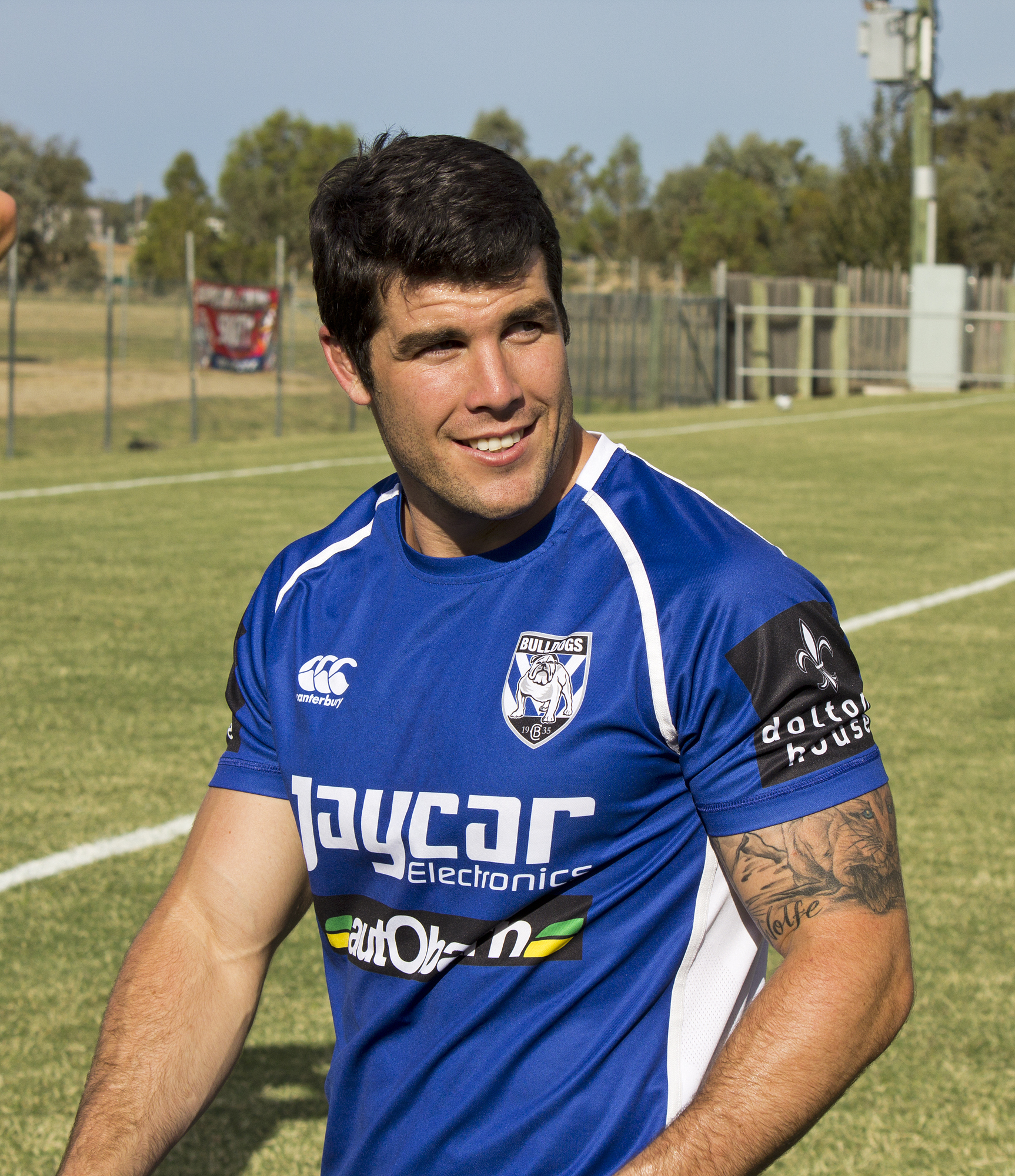
Ennis training with the Bulldogs in 2012.

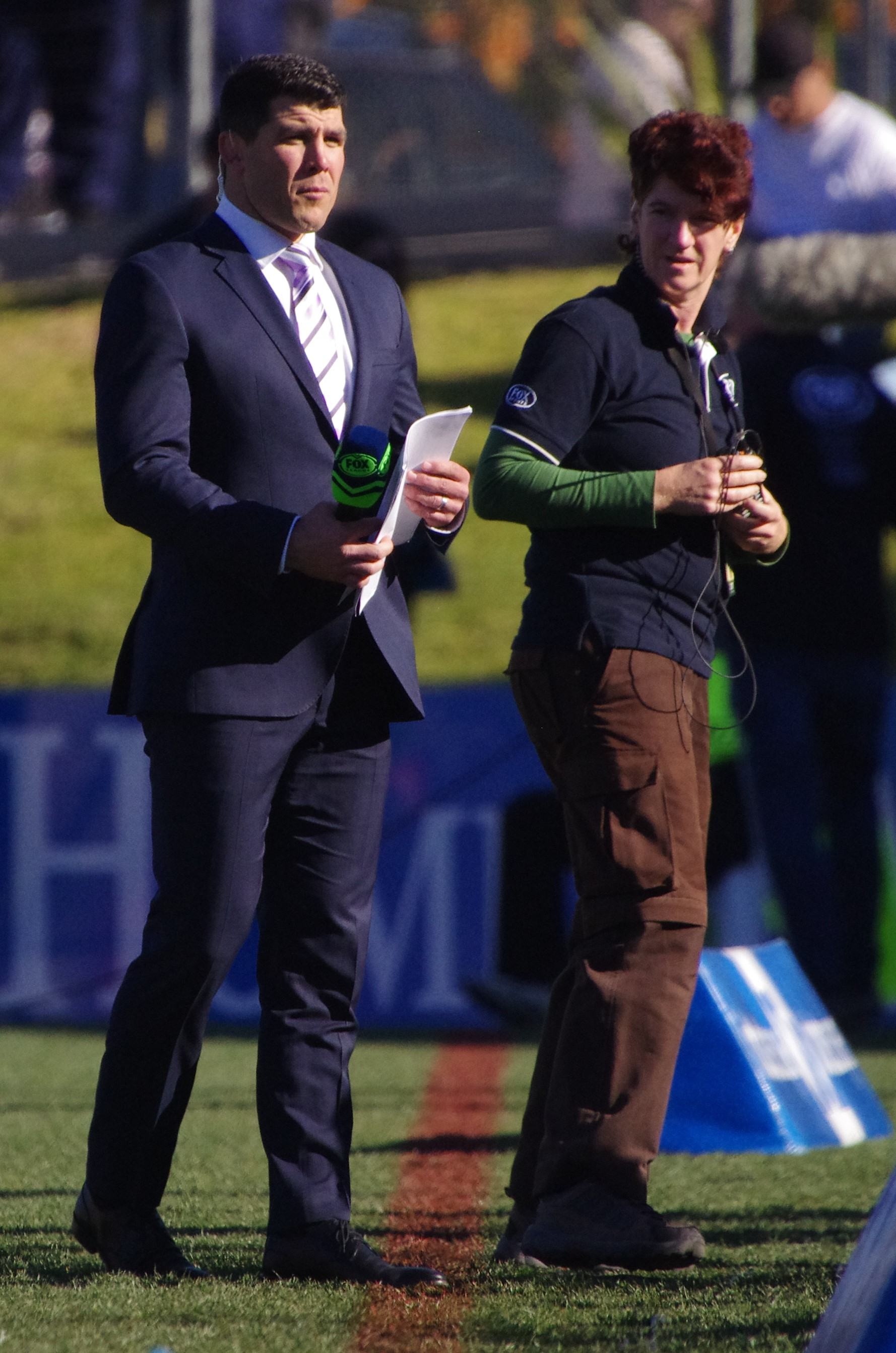
Ennis working for Fox Sports in 2017

Ennis joined the Canterbury-Bankstown Bulldogs from Brisbane for the 2009 NRL season.

He was selected for Country in the City vs Country match on 8 May 2009.

Ennis made his State of Origin debut for New South Wales in Game III of the 2009 series, replacing bitter rival Robbie Farah who was dropped. Ennis made an impact in his first game as the Blues won a dead rubber match, 28–16 with Ennis landing three goals from three attempts. At club level, Ennis played 25 games for Canterbury in his first season there as they finished second on the table and qualified for the finals. Ennis played in Canterbury's preliminary final defeat against arch rivals Parramatta at ANZ Stadium.

He filled the full-time goal-kicking role at Canterbury-Bankstown in 2010, replacing Hazem El Masri, who retired in 2009. However, he was replaced by specialist Bryson Goodwin.

Ennis played in all three games in 2010 State of Origin series, all resulting in losses. In the third match, Ennis was blamed by some for costing NSW victory when he gave away a penalty by punching Queensland's Nate Myles with six minutes to go (NSW at the time were leading 18–13). Despite calls for his omission from the team, he was selected for all three games the following series, also lost.

In the three-year period from the start of 2008 season, Ennis was penalised in games 58 times, the 2nd most of any player in the NRL behind Anthony Watmough. In 2011, he was penalised 17 times in his 12 appearances. In 2012, he was penalised 20 times in 20 games.

In February, 2011, Ennis signed a new three-year contract with Canterbury. Then-coach Kevin Moore said, "Mick is the kind of player that any head coach would love to have in his side. He leaves nothing to chance, he's a natural leader, is about the fittest bloke in the team and he gives us outstanding direction on and off the field."

Ennis played in 26 games in 2012 as Canterbury won the Minor Premiership. He missed only one game as Canterbury-Bankstown made the 2012 NRL Grand Final against Melbourne. However, he failed to score a try for the year. Canterbury would go on to lose the final 14–4 at ANZ Stadium.

Around halfway through the 2014 NRL season, Ennis signed on with the Cronulla-Sutherland Sharks for what was likely to be the last two years of his career.

In Canterbury's Preliminary Final win over Penrith Panthers in September 2014, Ennis suffered a foot injury, ruling him out of the 2014 NRL Grand Final, with the captaincy for the Grand Final passed to James Graham and Trent Hodkinson meaning that Ennis had played his last game for Canterbury-Bankstown.

=== Cronulla-Sutherland Sharks ===
In 2015, he joined the Cronulla-Sutherland Sharks. Ennis played in Game 3 of the 2015 State of Origin series as Robbie Farah withdrew due to injury. In the 2015 NRL season, Ennis played 25 games for Cronulla as they qualified for the finals. Ennis played in the club's 39–0 elimination final loss against North Queensland.

In 2016, he announced he would retire at the end of the season. He finished the season on a high note, winning the 2016 NRL Grand Final in his last game.

== Post-playing career ==
In 2019, Ennis joined the Canberra Raiders as a coaching consultant. Ennis departed the Raiders and joined the Parramatta Eels again as a coaching consultant.

In 2023, Ennis had returned to Cronulla as a consultant and to act as the teams Elite Pathways development manager.

In late 2023, Manly-Warringah announced that Ennis had joined the coaching staff to help the teams hookers and halves. Ennis returned as a consultant ahead of the 2025 season.

On 10 September 2025, the Dragons announced that Ennis would join the team as an assistant coach for the 2026 season. On 21 April 2026 it was announced that Ennis had departed the club less than 24 hours after the sacking of head coach Shane Flanagan.

Ennis currently works for Fox Sports coverage of rugby league.

== Statistics ==
Year	Team	Games	Tries	Goals	FGs	Pts
2003	Newcastle Knights	1				
2004	Newcastle Knights	19	2			8
2005	St. George Illawarra Dragons	24	5	44		108
2006	Brisbane Broncos	5		6		12
2007	Brisbane Broncos	15	1	7		18
2008	Brisbane Broncos	22	7	50		128
2009	Canterbury-Bankstown Bulldogs	25	2	1		10
2010	Canterbury-Bankstown Bulldogs	21	4			16
2011	Canterbury-Bankstown Bulldogs	12	2			8
2012	Canterbury-Bankstown Bulldogs	26				
2013	Canterbury-Bankstown Bulldogs	25	4			16
2014	Canterbury-Bankstown Bulldogs	27	4	1	1	19
2015	Cronulla-Sutherland Sharks	25	3			12
2016	Cronulla-Sutherland Sharks	26	2	1		10
	Totals	274	37	110	1	369
