= 2018 Melbourne Storm season =

- NRL Rank: 2nd
- Play-off result: Grand Finalist
- 2018 record: Wins: 16; draws: 0; losses: 8
- Points scored: For: 536; against: 363

Team information
- CEO: Dave Donaghy
- Coach: Craig Bellamy
- Captain: Cameron Smith (26 Games) Billy Slater (1 Game)
- Stadium: AAMI Park - 30,050; Suncorp Stadium - 52,500 (1 Game)
- Avg. attendance: 17,474
- High attendance: 31,118 (Round 10, vs. Gold Coast Titans)

Top scorers
- Tries: Josh Addo-Carr (17)
- Goals: Cameron Smith (88)
- Points: Cameron Smith (165)
← 2017	List of seasons	2019 →

The 2018 Melbourne Storm season was the 21st in the club's history. They competed in the 2018 NRL season and did so as the reigning Premiers and Minor Premiers. The team was coached by Craig Bellamy, coaching the club for his 16th consecutive season. Melbourne Storm was also captained by Cameron Smith, who has been the sole captain for the team since 2008 — making it his 11th consecutive season. In 2018, the club celebrated its 20th anniversary, which was launched on 30 October 2017 with the announcement that a new logo would feature for the duration of the 20 year celebrations including on a newly designed jersey.

At the conclusion of the 2018 NRL regular season, the Storm finished on 34 competition points (equal to the Sydney Roosters in first place), the Storm ultimately finished second due to having a slightly inferior points difference (by 8 points) and therefore missed winning the Minor Premiership, the second-placed finish, however, ensured a home final in Week 1 of the finals series. The Storm won both their Qualifying final and Preliminary finals qualifying them for their third straight Grand Final however they were ultimately beaten in the decider and therefore finished the season runners up.

== Season summary ==
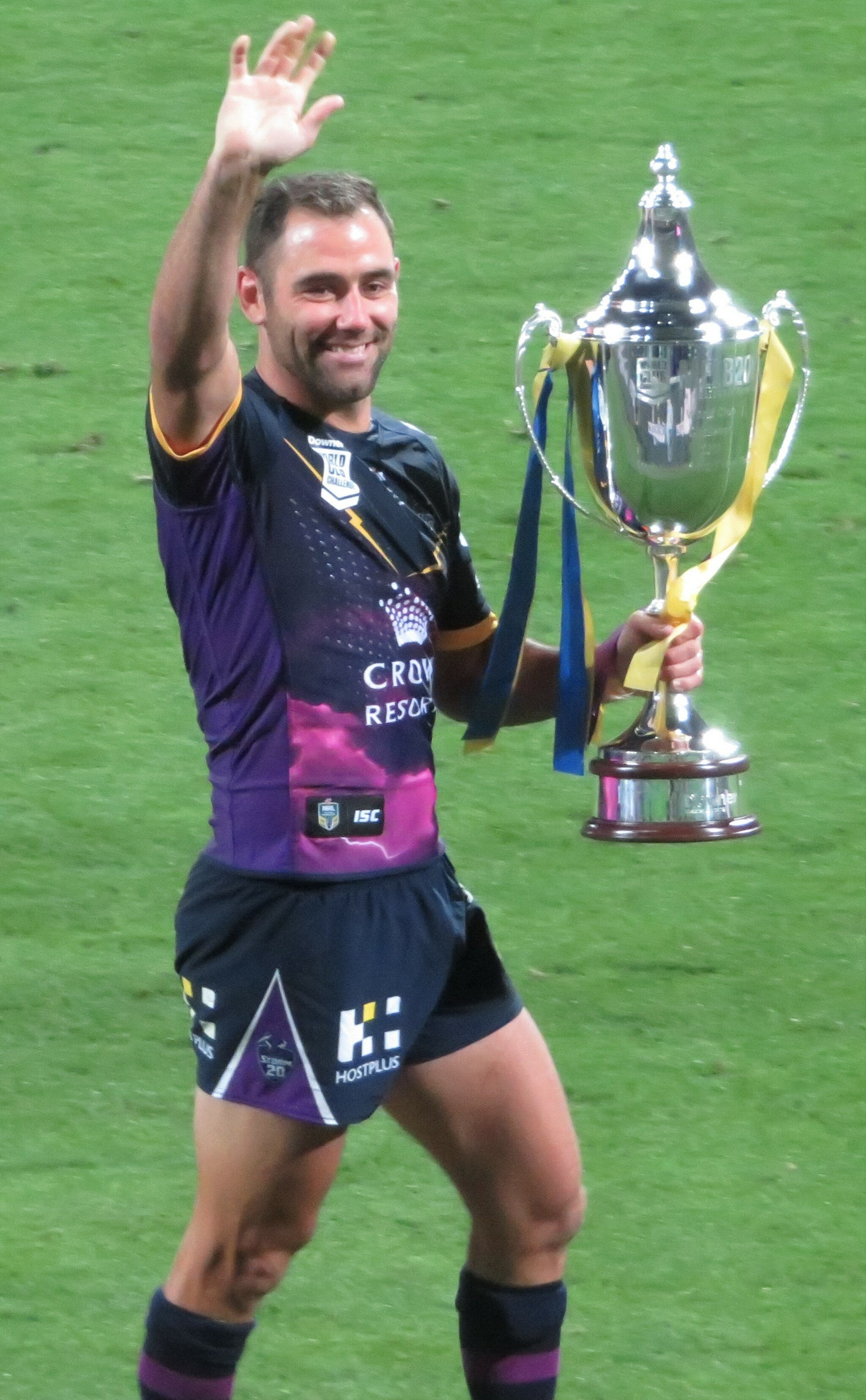
Cameron Smith with the 2018 World Club Challenge trophy

- 2018 World Club Challenge – The Melbourne Storm commenced their season by competing in the annual World Club Challenge against the 2017 Super League premiers Leeds Rhinos, the match was under a cloud until on 3 November 2017 it was announced that it would be played in Australia at AAMI Park due to the disruptions to the Storm preseason caused by the 2017 Rugby League World Cup. The Storm prevailed 38–4 to become World Club Champions and in doing so became the fifth Australian team to hold the treble (Premiership, Minor Premiership and World Club Challenge at once). It was the first World Club Challenge in Australia since 2014 and only the fourth in history.
- 23 February – Over 20,000 fans brave torrential rain to attend the trial match between the Storm and the North Queensland Cowboys at Suncorp Stadium in Brisbane. The "A Night with Cam and JT" match billed as a testimonial to Storm captain Cameron Smith and Cowboys captain Johnathan Thurston raises money for a variety of charities. Thurston set up the winning try in the final minute to take a 16–14 win.
- 2 March – Melbourne Storm announce their team of the first 20 years during a celebratory night at Crown Palladium. The 17-man line-up is made up of the greatest players to have pulled on the purple jersey over the last two decades.
- Round 1 – Melbourne Storm open the season with a victory over the Canterbury-Bankstown Bulldogs at the new Optus Stadium in Perth. The win marked the 16th consecutive season that the club has won their opening game of the season, and also this was their 11th consecutive victory making this their equal 4th best winning streak. Sam Kasiano also made his Storm debut.
- Round 2 – Hampered by a high error count, Melbourne's winning streak comes to an end losing 10–8 to the Wests Tigers in Billy Slater's 300th NRL game. Kenny Bromwich also played his 100th NRL game.
- Round 3 – In the 2017 NRL Grand Final rematch against the Cowboys, Melbourne return to the winner's list in a 30–14 victory.
- Round 4 – Melbourne are held tryless in a 14–4 loss to Cronulla, as referees Alan Shortall and Matt Cecchin take the NRL's penalty crackdown to the extreme in calling 33 penalties, including sending Cameron Smith to the sin bin for the first time in his career.
- Round 5 – Played as a double-header at Mount Smart Stadium in Auckland, Wests Tigers again frustrate Melbourne into a tight 11–10 loss. The match was Craig Bellamy's 400th as coach, and Ryan Hoffman's 250th game for the club in his third spell in Melbourne. The two wins and three losses from the first five games, was Melbourne's worst start to a season since 2004, with the club dropping out of the top eight on the NRL ladder for the first time since 2014.
- Round 6 – Led by doubles to wingers Josh Addo-Carr and Suliasi Vunivalu, Storm return to the winners list with a 40–14 win over Newcastle Knights.
- Round 8 – Storm score a 40-point win over the second placed New Zealand Warriors to retain the Michael Moore Trophy, with Cameron Smith scoring nine goals from as many attempts.
- Round 9 – Josh Addo-Carr scores all three of Melbourne tries in a 30–14 loss to the ladder-leading St George Illawarra Dragons. Papua New Guinea centre Justin Olam makes his first grade debut.
- Round 10 – Cameron Smith was charged with dangerous conduct in a tackle on former Storm player Kevin Proctor with Smith taking an early guilty plea in taking a one-match suspension.
- Round 11 – Curtis Scott becomes the first player sent off in a NRL game since 2015, and the first Storm player since 2011, for repeatedly punching Manly's Dylan Walker in a brawl between the pair. Scott would later be suspended for two matches by the NRL Judiciary. Manly would win the game 24–4 with officials mistakenly sending two Manly players back on to the field from the sin bin before their penalties had expired.
- Round 12 – Sam Kasiano and Dale Finucane both play their 150th NRL games in a 7–6 win over the Cowboys. Cameron Munster slotting the first field goal of his career to secure the win, after Cameron Smith scored a try in his return from suspension.
- 30 May – Young Tonumaipea announces he will leave the club to take up Mormon missionary work in Germany.
- Round 14 – Melbourne rally from a 12–2 first half deficit to take a 32–16 win over Brisbane Broncos, the club's 15th win from 17 matches between the clubs since 2011.
- 16 June – Ending speculation of a potential move to Brisbane, coach Craig Bellamy re-signs with the club until the end of the 2021 season.
- Round 16 – A last-minute field goal from Cameron Smith hands Melbourne a 9–8 win over the Sydney Roosters at the Adelaide Oval in the first meeting against former Storm halfback Cooper Cronk. Patrick Kaufusi made his first grade debut for the Storm, the third Kaufusi brother to play for the club.
- 3 July – Ryan Hoffman announces that the 2018 season will be his last in rugby league, after playing over 300 games.
- Round 17 – Missing players through injury and Origin selection, Melbourne score four tries in the last 15 minutes to over power the Dragons in a high scoring game 52–30. All seven players members of the Storm's backline scored tries, a feat last achieved by the club against the Gold Coast Titans in 2007. Albert Vete makes his club debut after transferring from the New Zealand Warriors earlier in the week, while Christian Welch played his 50th game.
- Round 18 – With Craig Bellamy opting to rest Origin representatives against Manly, the Sea Eagles jump to a 12–0 lead, before Melbourne score a late penalty goal to take a 14–13 win.
- Round 19 – Melbourne Storm defeat the New Zealand Warriors 12–6 in Auckland, with the sending the Storm to first place on the NRL ladder for the first time in 2018.
- Round 20 – Storm's winning run extends to eight matches with a 44–10 win over Canberra Raiders, with Jahrome Hughes impressing at halfback.
- Round 21 – South Sydney Rabbitohs end Melbourne's win streak, taking a 30–20 win at ANZ Stadium. Melbourne had led 16–12 at half time, but the Rabbitohs' took the points and top spot on the NRL ladder with a dominant second half.
- 8 August – Billy Slater announces that he will retire from rugby league at the end of the 2018 NRL season
- Round 22 – A second straight defeat, falling 17–14 to the Sharks at AAMI Park. Craig Bellamy was quoted after the match as saying the team lacked hunger.
- Round 24 - Storm defeat the Titans 10–8 to move to outright first on the NRL ladder.
- Round 25 - Melbourne are defeated 22–16 by the Penrith Panthers in the Panthers first ever win at AAMI Park and their first win in Melbourne since 2005. The game marked Scott Drinkwater's NRL debut, with the young fullback also scoring his first try. The loss for Melbourne saw the club finish the season on 34 competition points, creating NRL history, as due to other results, all teams in the top four finished equal on 34 points ensuring the closest finish to a season for the first time in the game's 111-year history. Melbourne would finish in second position behind the Roosters due to an inferior points difference.
- Qualifying final – In a quality contest, a field goal in the final five minutes from Cameron Munster sees Melbourne seal a 29–28 win over South Sydney at AAMI Park to progress to the preliminary finals. Doubles to Suliasi Vunivalu and Cheyse Blair helping Melbourne to the club's 15th straight win over South Sydney in Victoria.
- 14 September – Cameron Smith agrees to a one-year contract extension to the end of the 2019 NRL season.
- Preliminary final – Melbourne advance to a third straight NRL Grand Final appearance, ending the Sharks season with a 22–6 win. In a man of the match display, Billy Slater scored two tries but was also charged with a grade one shoulder charge when trying to stop Sharks winger Sosaia Feki from scoring, an offence that could see him miss the Grand Final.
- 25 September – Billy Slater is cleared by the NRL Judiciary panel after a lengthy hearing.
- Grand Final – Despite playing with a serious shoulder injury, former Storm player Cooper Cronk leads the Sydney Roosters to a 21–6 victory in the Grand Final. Cameron Munster was sin binned for a professional foul in the first half with the Roosters scoring not long after to lead 18–0. The Storm fell victims to their own errors and the intensity of the Roosters defence, with Munster sin binned for a second time late in the game to become the first player sin binned twice in a Grand Final.
- 1 October – Victorian Minister for Sport John Eren announces that Cameron Smith and Billy Slater will be honoured with statues outside AAMI Park.

=== Milestone games ===
Round	Player	Milestone
Round 1	Sam Kasiano	Storm debut
Round 2	Billy Slater	300th game
Round 2	Kenny Bromwich	100th game
Round 3	Suliasi Vunivalu	50th game
Round 5	Craig Bellamy	400th game as Coach
Round 5	Ryan Hoffman	250th Storm game
Round 9	Justin Olam	NRL debut
Round 11	Harry Grant	NRL debut
Round 12	Dale Finucane	150th game
Round 12	Sam Kasiano	150th game
Round 16	Patrick Kaufusi	Storm debut
Round 17	Albert Vete	Storm debut
Round 17	Christian Welch	50th game
Round 18	Tim Glasby	100th game
Round 25	Scott Drinkwater	NRL debut
Qualifying final	Jesse Bromwich	200th game

== Fixtures ==
=== Pre-season ===
Date	Round	Opponent	Venue	Result	Mel.	Opp.	Source
7 February	Trial Match^{1}	Newcastle Knights	AAMI Park, Melbourne	Loss	22	26	
16 February	2018 World Club Challenge	Leeds Rhinos	AAMI Park, Melbourne	Win	38	4	
17 February	Trial Match^{2}	New Zealand Warriors	Rotorua International Stadium, Rotorua	Loss	14	20	
23 February	Cameron Smith & Johnathan Thurston Testimonial Match	North Queensland Cowboys	Suncorp Stadium, Brisbane	Loss	14	16	

^{1} Match played behind closed doors.
^{2} Storm players that did not play in the World Club Challenge played the Trial game.

=== Regular season ===
Round	1	2	3	4	5	6	7	8	9	10	11	12	13	14	15	16	17	18	19	20	21	22	23	24	25
Ground	A	H	H	A	A	H	A	H	A	N	H	A	–	H	A	A	H	A	A	H	A	H	H	A	H
Result	W	L	W	L	L	W	W	W	L	W	L	W	B	W	W	W	W	W	W	W	L	L	W	W	L
Position	2	8	4	6	9	5	5	4	4	4	6	6	6	5	5	3	3	2	1	1	2	3	1	1	2
Points	2	2	4	4	4	6	8	10	10	12	12	14	16	18	20	22	24	26	28	30	30	30	32	34	34

Source: Rugby League Tables
A = Away; H = Home; N = Neutral; B = Bye; W = Win; D = Draw; L = Loss

==== Matches ====
- (g.p.) – Golden Point extra time
- (pen) – Penalty try

Date	Rd	Opponent	Venue	Result	Mel.	Opp.	Tries	Goals	Field goals	Ref
10 March	1	Canterbury-Bankstown Bulldogs	Perth Stadium, Perth (Double Header)	Won	36	18	J Addo-Carr (2), R Jacks, C Scott, K Bromwich, S Vunivalu	C Smith 6/6		
17 March	2	Wests Tigers	AAMI Park, Melbourne	Lost	8	10	S Vunivalu	C Smith 2/3		
22 March	3	North Queensland Cowboys	AAMI Park, Melbourne	Won	30	14	J Stimson, C Welch, W Chambers, N Asofa-Solomona	C Smith 6/6, B Croft 1/2		
30 March	4	Cronulla-Sutherland Sharks	Southern Cross Group Stadium, Sydney	Lost	4	14		J. Stimson 2/2		
7 April	5	Wests Tigers	Mt Smart Stadium, Auckland (Double Header)	Lost	10	11	B Slater	B Croft 3/3		
13 April	6	Newcastle Knights	AAMI Park, Melbourne	Won	40	14	J Addo-Carr (2), S Vunivalu (2), T Glasby, F Kaufusi, S Kasiano	C Smith 6/8		
20 April	7	Brisbane Broncos	Suncorp Stadium, Brisbane	Won	34	20	J Addo-Carr (2), B Smith (2), W Chambers, S Vunivalu	C Smith 5/7		
25 April	8	New Zealand Warriors	AAMI Park, Melbourne	Won	50	10	R Jacks (2), J Addo-Carr (2), R Hoffman, C Welch, B Slater, Y Tonumaipea	C Smith 9/9		
6 May	9	St George-Illawarra Dragons	UOW Jubilee Oval, Sydney	Lost	14	34	J Addo-Carr (3)	C Smith 1/3		
12 May	10	Gold Coast Titans	Suncorp Stadium, Brisbane (Double Header)	Won	28	14	C Scott, F Kaufusi, C Munster, J Addo-Carr	C Smith 6/6		
19 May	11	Manly Sea Eagles	AAMI Park, Melbourne	Lost	4	24		C Munster 2/2		
25 May	12	North Queensland Cowboys	1300SMILES Stadium, Townsville	Won	7	6	C Smith	C Smith 1/2	C Munster 1/1	
	13	Bye								
10 June	14	Brisbane Broncos	AAMI Park, Melbourne	Won	32	16	Y Tonumaipea, F Kaufusi, C Munster, S Vunivalu, J Hughes	C Smith 5/5		
17 June	15	Newcastle Knights	McDonald Jones Stadium, Newcastle	Won	28	10	J Addo-Carr (2), R Jacks, S Vunivalu	C Smith 6/7		
29 June	16	Sydney Roosters	Adelaide Oval, Adelaide	Won	9	8	N Asofa-Solomona	C Smith 2/2	C Smith 1/1, C Munster 0/2	
5 July	17	St George-Illawarra Dragons	AAMI Park, Melbourne	Won	52	30	C Blair (2), C Scott, B Croft, R Hoffman, Y Tonumaipea, J Hughes, R Jacks, S Vunivalu	C Smith 8/10		
14 July	18	Manly Warringah Sea Eagles	Lottoland, Sydney	Won	14	13	S Vunivalu, B Croft	C Smith 3/3		
22 July	19	New Zealand Warriors	Mt Smart Stadium, Auckland	Won	12	6	W Chambers, S Vunivalu	C Smith 2/4		
28 July	20	Canberra Raiders	AAMI Park, Melbourne	Won	44	10	C Scott (2), F Kaufusi, C Munster, S Vunivalu, J Addo-Carr, N Asofa-Solomona	C Smith 8/9		
3 August	21	South Sydney Rabbitohs	ANZ Stadium, Sydney	Lost	20	30	J Addo-Carr (2), D Finucane, C Scott	C Smith 2/3, J Stimson 0/1		
12 August	22	Cronulla-Sutherland Sharks	AAMI Park, Melbourne	Lost	14	17	S Vunivalu (2), B Slater	C Smith 1/3		
17 August	23	Parramatta Eels	AAMI Park, Melbourne	Won	20	4	W Chambers, N Asofa-Solomona, C Scott	C Smith 3/3, B Croft 1/2		
25 August	24	Gold Coast Titans	Cbus Super Stadium, Gold Coast	Won	10	8	C Scott, C Munster	C Smith 1/2		
31 August	25	Penrith Panthers	AAMI Park, Melbourne	Lost	16	22	F Kaufusi, S Drinkwater	C Smith 4/5		

=== Finals ===
Date	Round	Opponent	Venue	Result	Mel.	Opp.	Tries	Goals	Field Goals	Report
7 September	Week 1 - Qualifying Final	South Sydney Rabbitohs	AAMI Park, Melbourne	Win	29	28	S Vunivalu (2), C Blair (2), C Scott	C Smith 4/6	C Munster 1/1	
21 September	Week 3 - Preliminary Final	Cronulla Sharks	AAMI Park, Melbourne	Win	22	6	B Slater (2), B Croft	C Smith 5/5		
30 September	2018 NRL Grand Final	Sydney Roosters	ANZ Stadium, Sydney	Loss	6	21	J Addo-Carr	C Smith 1/1		

=== Ladder ===
Pos	Team	Pld	W	D	L	B	PF	PA	PD	Pts	
1	Sydney Roosters (M, P)	24	16	0	8	1	542	361	+181	34	Advance to finals series
2	Melbourne Storm	24	16	0	8	1	536	363	+173	34	Advance to finals series
3	South Sydney Rabbitohs	24	16	0	8	1	582	437	+145	34	Advance to finals series
4	Cronulla-Sutherland Sharks	24	16	0	8	1	519	423	+96	34	Advance to finals series
5	Penrith Panthers	24	15	0	9	1	517	461	+56	32	Advance to finals series
6	Brisbane Broncos	24	15	0	9	1	556	500	+56	32	Advance to finals series
7	St. George Illawarra Dragons	24	15	0	9	1	519	472	+47	32	Advance to finals series
8	New Zealand Warriors	24	15	0	9	1	472	447	+25	32	Advance to finals series
9	Wests Tigers	24	12	0	12	1	377	460	−83	26	
10	Canberra Raiders	24	10	0	14	1	563	540	+23	22	
11	Newcastle Knights	24	9	0	15	1	414	607	−193	20	
12	Canterbury-Bankstown Bulldogs	24	8	0	16	1	428	474	−46	18	
13	North Queensland Cowboys	24	8	0	16	1	449	521	−72	18	
14	Gold Coast Titans	24	8	0	16	1	472	582	−110	18	
15	Manly-Warringah Sea Eagles	24	7	0	17	1	500	622	−122	16	
16	Parramatta Eels (W)	24	6	0	18	1	374	550	−176	14	

Updated to match(es) played on 2 September 2018. Source: 2018 NRL Ladder
(M) Minor premiers; (P) Premiers; (W) Wooden spoon

== Coaching staff ==
- Craig Bellamy - Head Coach
- Adam O’Brien - Assistant Coach
- Jason Ryles - Assistant Coach
- Ben Jack - U/20s Head Coach
- Marc Brentnall – Development Coach
- Aaron Bellamy – Development Coach
- Frank Ponissi - Football Director
- Nick Maxwell - Leadership Coach
- Craig McRae – Kicking & Catching Coach
- Scott Sipple - Easts Tigers Feeder Club Coach
- Craig Ingebrigtsen - Sunshine Coast Falcons Feeder Club Coach

== 2018 Squad ==
List current as of 23 March 2018

Cap (Note: Players are listed with the cap number as they appear on the Melbourne Storm honour board. Additional squad members do not have a cap number.)	Nat.	Player name	Position	First Storm Game	Previous First Grade RL club (Note: This column denotes the previous RL club the player was signed to and played first grade RL for. If they are yet to debut then this is stipulated. If they were merely signed to the club but did not play then it is not counted.)
55	(Australia)	Cameron Smith (c)	HK	2002	(Australia) Melbourne Storm
58	(Australia)	Billy Slater	FB	2003	(Australia) Melbourne Storm
62	(Australia)	Ryan Hoffman	SR	2003	New Zealand Warriors
97	(Australia)	Will Chambers	CE	2007	(Australia) Melbourne Storm
119	(New Zealand)	Jesse Bromwich	PR	2010	(Australia) Melbourne Storm
149	(New Zealand)	Kenny Bromwich	PR, SR, LK	2013	(Australia) Melbourne Storm
153	(Australia)	Tim Glasby	PR, SR	2013	(Australia) Melbourne Storm
154	(Samoa)	Young Tonumaipea	WG, FB	2014	(Australia) Melbourne Storm
160	(Australia)	Cameron Munster	FE, FB, HB, HK	2014	(Australia) Melbourne Storm
163	(Australia)	Dale Finucane	PR, SR, LK	2015	(Australia) Canterbury Bulldogs
164	(Tonga)	Felise Kaufusi	PR	2015	(Australia) Melbourne Storm
166	(New Zealand)	Nelson Asofa-Solomona	SR, PR	2015	(Australia) Melbourne Storm
167	(Australia)	Christian Welch	SR, PR	2015	(Australia) Melbourne Storm
170	(Australia)	Curtis Scott	CE, WG	2016	(Australia) Melbourne Storm
171	(Fiji)	Suliasi Vunivalu	WG	2016	(Australia) Melbourne Storm
172	(Australia)	Cheyse Blair	WG, CE	2016	(Australia) Manly Sea Eagles
174	(Australia)	Brodie Croft	HB	2016	(Australia) Melbourne Storm
176	(Australia)	Josh Addo-Carr	WG, FB	2017	(Australia) Wests Tigers
177	(Canada)	Ryley Jacks	FE	2017	(Australia) Melbourne Storm
179	(Australia)	Joe Stimson	SR, LK	2017	(Australia) Melbourne Storm
181	(Fiji)	Tui Kamikamica	SR, PR	2017	(Australia) Melbourne Storm
182	(New Zealand)	Brandon Smith	HK	2017	(Australia) Melbourne Storm
184	(New Zealand)	Jahrome Hughes	FE, FB	2017	(Australia) North Queensland Cowboys
186	(Samoa)	Sam Kasiano	PR	2018	(Australia) Canterbury Bulldogs
187	(Papua New Guinea)	Justin Olam	WG, CE	2018	(Australia) Melbourne Storm
188	(Australia)	Harry Grant	HK	2018	(Australia) Melbourne Storm
189	(Tonga)	Patrick Kaufusi	PR	2018	(Australia) North Queensland Cowboys
190	(Tonga)	Albert Vete	PR	2018	(Australia) New Zealand Warriors
191	(Australia)	Scott Drinkwater	FB	2018	(Australia) Melbourne Storm
	(Australia)	Billy Walters	FE	Yet to debut	(Australia) Melbourne Storm
	(New Zealand)	Sandor Earl	WG	Yet to debut	(Australia) Canberra Raiders
	(Australia)	Tom Eisenhuth	SR	Yet to debut	(Australia) Penrith Panthers
	(Samoa)	Marion Seve	WG	Yet to debut	(Australia) Melbourne Storm
	(Australia)	Lachlan Timm	PR	Yet to Debut	(Australia) Melbourne Storm
	(Australia)	Louis Geraghty	PR	Yet to debut	(Australia) Melbourne Storm
	(Australia)	Ryan Papenhuyzen	FB	Yet to debut	(Australia) Melbourne Storm
	(New Zealand)	Kayleb Milne	SR	Yet to debut	(Australia) Melbourne Storm
	(Australia)	Cooper Johns	FE	Yet to debut	(Australia) Melbourne Storm
	(Fiji)	Junior Ratuva	WG	Yet to debut	(Australia) Melbourne Storm

== Player movements ==
Losses

- Jesse Arthars to South Sydney Rabbitohs
- Cooper Cronk to Sydney Roosters
- Charlie Galo to Released
- Slade Griffen to Newcastle Knights
- Tohu Harris to New Zealand Warriors
- Jeremy Hawkins to Released
- Vincent Leuluai to South Sydney Rabbitohs
- Jordan McLean to North Queensland Cowboys
- Nate Myles to Retired
- Mark Nicholls to South Sydney Rabbitohs
- Robbie Rochow to Wests Tigers
- Young Tonumaipea to Released (Note: Religious mission) (mid season)
- Jake Turpin to Released

Gains

- Sandor Earl from Unattached
- Tom Eisenhuth from Penrith Panthers (mid season)
- Ryan Hoffman from New Zealand Warriors
- Cooper Johns from Manly Sea Eagles
- Sam Kasiano from Canterbury Bankstown Bulldogs
- Patrick Kaufusi from North Queensland Cowboys
- Kayleb Milne from New Zealand Rugby Union
- Ryan Papenhuyzen from Wests Tigers
- Marion Seve from Brisbane Broncos (mid season)
- Billy Walters from Eastern Suburbs Tigers
- Albert Vete from New Zealand Warriors (mid season)

== Representative honours ==
The following players have played a first grade representative match in 2018.

- (c) = Captain

Player	State of Origin 1	Midseason International tests	State of Origin 2	State of Origin 3	Post-season International tests
Josh Addo-Carr	New South Wales	—N/a	New South Wales	New South Wales	—N/a
Nelson Asofa-Solomona	—N/a	New Zealand	—N/a	—N/a	New Zealand
Jesse Bromwich	—N/a	—N/a	—N/a	—N/a	New Zealand
Kenny Bromwich	—N/a	—N/a	—N/a	—N/a	New Zealand
Will Chambers	Queensland	—N/a	Queensland	Queensland	—N/a
Tim Glasby	—N/a	—N/a	—N/a	Queensland	—N/a
Jahrome Hughes	—N/a	—N/a	—N/a	—N/a	New Zealand
Tui Kamikamica	—N/a	Fiji	—N/a	—N/a	—N/a
Sam Kasiano	—N/a	Samoa	—N/a	—N/a	—N/a
Felise Kaufusi	Queensland	—N/a	Queensland	Queensland	Australia
Cameron Munster	Queensland	—N/a	Queensland	Queensland	—N/a
Justin Olam	—N/a	Papua New Guinea	—N/a	—N/a	—N/a
Billy Slater	—N/a	—N/a	Queensland	Queensland (c)	—N/a
Brandon Smith	—N/a	—N/a	—N/a	—N/a	New Zealand
Suliasi Vunivalu	—N/a	Fiji	—N/a	—N/a	—N/a

== Squad statistics ==
Statistics Source: Statistics current as of the end of the 2018 NRL regular season (this table does not include finals matches)

Name	App	T	G	FG	Pts
Josh Addo-Carr	22	17	0	0	68
Nelson Asofa-Solomona	22	4	0	0	16
Cheyse Blair	7	2	0	0	8
Jesse Bromwich	17	0	0	0	0
Kenny Bromwich	22	1	0	0	4
Will Chambers	17	4	0	0	16
Brodie Croft	9	2	5	0	18
Scott Drinkwater	1	1	0	0	4
Dale Finucane	15	1	0	0	4
Tim Glasby	21	1	0	0	4
Harry Grant	1	0	0	0	0
Ryan Hoffman	20	2	0	0	8
Jahrome Hughes	11	2	0	0	8
Ryley Jacks	13	5	0	0	20
Tui Kamikamica	5	0	0	0	0
Sam Kasiano	13	1	0	0	4
Felise Kaufusi	18	5	0	0	20
Patrick Kaufusi	2	0	0	0	0
Cameron Munster	21	4	2	1	21
Justin Olam	3	0	0	0	0
Curtis Scott	21	8	0	0	32
Billy Slater	17	5	0	0	20
Brandon Smith	15	0	0	0	0
Cameron Smith	23	1	88	1	181
Joe Stimson	21	1	2	0	8
Young Tonumaipea	7	3	0	0	12
Albert Vete	1	0	0	0	0
Suliasi Vunivalu	20	13	0	0	52
Christian Welch	23	2	0	0	8
29 Players used	—	85	97	2	536

Scorers

Most Points in a Game: 18 points

- Round 8: Cameron Smith (9 Goals) vs. New Zealand Warriors

Most tries in a Game: 3

- Round 9: Josh Addo-Carr vs. St. George Illawarra Dragons

Winning Games

Highest score in a winning game: 52 points

- Round 17: vs. St. George Illawarra Dragons

Lowest score in a winning game: 7 points

- Round 12: vs. North Queensland Cowboys

Greatest winning margin: 40 points

- Round 8: vs. New Zealand Warriors

Greatest number of Games won consecutively: 8

- Round 12 to Round 20

Losing Games

Highest score in a losing game: 20 points

- Round 21: vs. South Sydney Rabbitohs

Lowest score in a losing game: 4 points

- Round 4: vs. Cronulla Sharks
- Round 11: vs. Manly Sea Eagles

Greatest losing margin: 20 points

- Round 9: vs. St. George Illawarra Dragons
- Round 11: vs. Manly Sea Eagles

Greatest number of Games lost consecutively: 2

- Round 4 to Round 5
- Round 20 to Round 21

== Jerseys ==
Home
On 1 November 2017 the Storm revealed their new 2018 Home jersey which is once again produced by ISC. The New Jersey is a tribute to the original jersey worn by Storm during its inaugural 1998 season. It has been produced to celebrate and acknowledge the history of the club as it celebrates its 20th anniversary throughout 2018. The signature ‘V’ representing Victoria returns although is more of a traditional V rather than the style used on the original jersey and it is showcased by the heritage colours of purple and white, while the iconic purple also features around the edging of the sleeves. The popular yellow returns with trimming around the neck a throwback to the late 90s when i featured as part of the collar. Purple lightning bolts also sit on either side of the jersey. Navy has been made the primary colour to commemorate the original Storm jerseys worn during the club's formative years. On the front of the Jersey is the new Storm logo that was revealed on Monday as part of a launch of the 20-year celebrations. This logo is a temporary logo for the duration of the 20 year celebrations.

Away
On 3 November 2017 the club revealed the new 20th Anniversary away jersey The away jersey is another tribute to the past with the club's iconic lightning bolts watermarked on the front of the jersey. The heritage colour of navy also features on the all white jersey, with horizontal stripes running across the bolts. Purple appears around the edging of the sleeves, identical to the home jersey. The away jersey was worn on nine occasions in 2018 (Rounds 7, 12, 15–16, 18–19, 21, 24, and the 2018 NRL Grand Final). A variation of the away jersey was worn in Round 19 due to restrictions on gambling advertising in New Zealand.

Special
On 24 January 2018 the club released a special jersey that was worn in the 2018 World Club Challenge. The jersey was the same design worn in the 2017 NRL Auckland Nines competition, with the new logos featuring on the front.

During the season Melbourne Melbourne Storm wore the following additional alternate jerseys:

- A version of their home jersey with a red "Poppy" chevron to commemorate ANZAC Day (Round 8)
- An Indigenous jersey design (Round 10)
- A 20th anniversary design similar to the 1999 jersey, with players names subliminated into the design (Round 17)
- A mostly purple with pink accents version of the home jersey to celebrate women in rugby league (Round 22)

== Awards ==
=== Trophy Cabinet ===
- 2018 World Club Challenge Trophy
- 2018 Michael Moore Trophy

=== Melbourne Storm Awards Night ===
Held at Peninsula Docklands, Melbourne on Thursday 3 October.

- Melbourne Storm Player of the Year: Cameron Munster
- Billy Slater Rookie of the Year: Brandon Smith
- Melbourne Storm Members' Player of Year: Cameron Munster
- Melbourne Storm Most Improved: Christian Welch
- Melbourne Storm Best Back: Billy Slater
- Melbourne Storm Best Forward: Dale Finucane
- Cooper Cronk Feeder Club Player of the Year: Scott Drinkwater
- Darren Bell U20s Player of the Year: Trent Toelau
- U20s Coaches Award: Matt Stimson
- U20s Best Back: Troy Hanita-Paki
- U20s Best Forward: Jordin Leiu
- U20s ACE Performance Award: Derek Maota
- Greg Brentnall Young Achievers Award: Haele Finau
- Mick Moore Club Person of the Year: Matthew Barradeen
- Life Member Inductee: Jesse Bromwich, Adam O’Brien, John Donohue
- Chairman's Award: Ashley Tucker
- Best Try: Josh Addo-Carr, Round 8 v Warriors

=== Dally M Awards Night ===
Held at Overseas Passenger Terminal, Sydney on Wednesday 26 September 2018.

- Dally M Captain of the Year: Cameron Smith
- Dally M Five-Eighth of the Year: Cameron Munster

=== Rugby League Players’ Association Awards Night ===
- RLPA Five-Eighth of the Year: Cameron Munster
- RLPA Prop of the Year: Nelson Asofa-Solomona

=== Additional Awards ===
- I Don't Quit Iron Bar: Tui Kamikamica
- World Club Challenge Medal: Nelson Asofa-Solomona
- Spirit of ANZAC Medal: Billy Slater
- Wally Lewis Medal: Billy Slater
- QRL Ron McAuliffe Medal: Billy Slater
- Queensland Cup Team of the Year: Scott Drinkwater (Fullback); Billy Walters (Five-eighth); Patrick Kaufusi (Second row)
