= 2017 Melbourne Storm season =

- 2017 NRL premiers
- NRL Rank: 1st (minor premiership)
- Play-off result: Premiers
- 2017 record: Wins: 20; draws: 0; losses: 4
- Points scored: For: 633; against: 336

Team information
- CEO: Dave Donaghy
- Coach: Craig Bellamy
- Captain: Cameron Smith (23 Games) Jesse Bromwich (3 Games) Cooper Cronk (1 Game)
- Stadium: AAMI Park - 30,050; Suncorp Stadium - 52,500 (1 Game)
- Avg. attendance: 18,375 (new record)
- High attendance: 44,127 (at Suncorp Stadium)

Top scorers
- Tries: Suliasi Vunivalu (23); Josh Addo-Carr (23)
- Goals: Cameron Smith (92)
- Points: Cameron Smith (192)
← 2016	List of seasons	2018 →

The 2017 Melbourne Storm season was the 20th in the club's history. They competed in the 2017 NRL season and at the end of the regular season had finished in 1st place earning them their third legitimate minor premiership. The team was coached by Craig Bellamy, coaching the club for his 15th consecutive season. Melbourne Storm were also captained by Cameron Smith, who has been the sole captain for the team since 2008—making this his 10th consecutive season. Cameron Smith broke a number of league, club and personal records throughout the 2017 season including the NRL games record for the most games played, league record for the most wins as a captain, a personal best for the most points in a game and also scored his 2000th career point and 1000th career goal, the first time any player has achieved this.

With the Storm finishing first, they received a home qualifying final against the Parramatta Eels which they won giving them a week off and a home preliminary final. The Storm defeated the Brisbane Broncos 30–0 to qualify them for the 2017 NRL Grand Final against the North Queensland Cowboys. Melbourne Storm dominated the grand final to earn them their third premiership 34–6.

== Season summary ==
- Pre-season – New recruits took part in Melbourne Storm IDQ camp for pre season training before New Years. Brandon Smith was awarded the IDQ Iron bar.
- Auckland Nines – The club commenced their season competing in the annual Auckland Nines competition. After winning two of their three pool games they qualified for the finals. The Storm defeated the North Queensland Cowboys in the Quarter-finals before going down to the Sydney Roosters in the Semi-finals and ending their tournament. The squad was co-captained by Kenny Bromwich and Young Tonumaipea, with Cameron Munster and Brodie Croft making the team of the tournament.
- 11 February – In the Storm's first trial game they came back to win 30–18 after trailing 18–0 at halftime.
- Round 1 – Ryley Jacks and Josh Addo Carr make their Melbourne Storm debuts against the Canterbury Bulldogs. Will Chambers also played his 150th Game.
- Round 2 – The Storm defeat the New Zealand Warriors in very wet conditions 26–10. Cameron Smith scored 5 goals from 5 attempts, an impressive display given the conditions. The 10 points he scored also took him past 2000 career NRL points becoming the first forward, the first Queenslander, and just the fifth player in history to have achieved the milestone. Vincent Leualai and Joe Stimson make their playing debuts for the storm.
- Round 4 – After a terrible start, which saw the Storm down 14–0 at the 38th minute mark of the game, the Storm scored 22 unanswered points to come back to win 22–14 against Wests Tigers.
- Round 5 – Melbourne defeat Penrith in their biggest win this season to date. The win was notable because it was Cameron Smith's 238th first grade win, surpassing Darren Lockyer's record and therefore making him the most successful player in history. Mark Nicholls made his debut for the Storm and Tui Kamikamica made his NRL playing debut. In addition, following this victory, Melbourne Storm remained the only undefeated side in the competition.
- 4 April – Cooper Cronk announces that he will leave Melbourne Storm at the conclusion of the 2017 season and relocate to Sydney for personal reasons. At this time, he did not make it clear as to which club he will continue his career at or if indeed he will continue at all, as he will be 34 years of age by 2018.
- Round 8 – In the annual ANZAC Day Game, Melbourne Storm defeated the New Zealand Warriors 20–14 in a hard-fought, even contest.
- 26 April – The ANZAC Test squad is named with three Storm players named to take part. Will Chambers, Cooper Cronk and Cameron Smith as captain in his 50th test match for Australia.
- Round 9 – Melbourne defeated St George Illawarra 34–22 in the Storm first win in Wollongong since 2005 to move 2 game clear on top of the NRL table. Cameron Smith also broke the all-time league goal kicking record during the game and Cameron Munster played his 50th Game.
- Round 10 – Melbourne travelled to Suncorp stadium Brisbane for a "Home" game. The game was quite extraordinary for its high scoring in which Melbourne scored an NRL record equalling 36 points in a losing game with the Gold Coast Titans scoring two late tries to score 38 points. Cameron Smith also scored 12 points which is the highest number of points in a game thus far. Billy Slater also scored his 700th career point with his try.
- Round 13 – The Storm consolidate top spot on the table with their biggest win of the season to date defeating the Newcastle Knights 40–12. Felise Kaufusi played his 50th game and Brandon Smith made his playing debut and also scored his first try.
- 12 June – State of Origin game 2 teams are announced with 5 Storm players making the Queensland team. Cameron Smith (Captain), Cooper Cronk and Will Chambers all played in Game 1 while Billy Slater has been recalled after 2 years on the sideline due to injury. In addition, Tim Glasby was also announced to make his debut.
- Round 15 – With many players missing due to State of Origin duty, a number of players made their return to the side including Curtis Scott making his first appearance in 2017, and Brodie Croft his first appearance in almost 12 months, also Mark Nicholls and Joe Stimson. Dean Britt made his playing debut. The game was very close against the equally depleted Cowboys which ended up going into Golden Point extra time and it was Brodie Croft that kicked the winning field goal.
- Round 16 – Jahrome Hughes makes his debut for the Storm in the team's narrow 1 point Golden Point loss to the Roosters.
- Round 17 – Melbourne defeated Brisbane 42–12 in their biggest win of the season thus far.
- 3 July – Stet of Origin Game 3 teams are announced with six Storm players making the Queensland team. Cameron Smith (Captain), Cooper Cronk, Will Chambers, Billy Slater and Tim Glasby all return from Game 2 with Cameron Munster announced to make his debut.
- Round 18 – An undermanned Storm, (due to six players being absent on State of Origin duties), lose their fourth game of the season 22–6 to the Parramatta Eels with Nate Myles making his Storm debut.
- Round 21 – Cameron Smith runs out for his 350th Game placing him equal second on the all-time list with Terry Lamb. The Storm had a 40–6 win over the Sea Eagles the biggest win to date over the Sea Eagles
- Round 23 – The Storm narrowly defeated the Sydney Roosters to move three games clear on top of the ladder. The win was notable for a Penalty Try awarded to Suliasi Vunivalu in the first half, and in particular 12 of the Storms 16 points coming off penalties.
- Round 24 – The Storm thump the Newcastle Knights 44–12 in the club's highest scoring game this season to date. Brodie Croft also became the first Storm player to score 3 tries in a game this season. The win also secured Storm the 2017 Minor Premiership.
- Round 25 – Melbourne Storm demolish the South Sydney Rabbitohs 64–6 in their 5th biggest win in their history. The Storm scored 11 tries with Cameron Smith kicking 9 out of 9 goals and scoring a try this gave him 22 points for the game, his highest ever total in a single game and this was also his 250th win as captain. The win was by far the biggest of the season so far and it was also the largest score so far. Suliasi Vunivalu and Josh Addo -Carr also scored 3 tries apiece.
- Round 26 – Melbourne Storm defeat the Canberra Raiders 32–6 in the final home and away game of the season. This game was notable as Cameron Smith played his 355th game which drew him level with Darren Lockyer's NRL record for the most games played. In addition, it was also Cooper Cronk's final home and away game for the Storm, Nelson Asofa-Solomona played his 50th game and the Storm were awarded the J. J. Giltinan Shield for winning the Minor Premiership following the game.
- Qualifying final – Cameron Smith sets a new NRL record for the most games played, when he ran out for his 356th Game surpassing Darren Lockyer.
- Preliminary final – Melbourne Storm Qualify for their second consecutive Grand Final defeating the Brisbane Broncos 30–0. Cameron Smith also scored his 1000th Goal during the game becoming the first NRL player to do so.

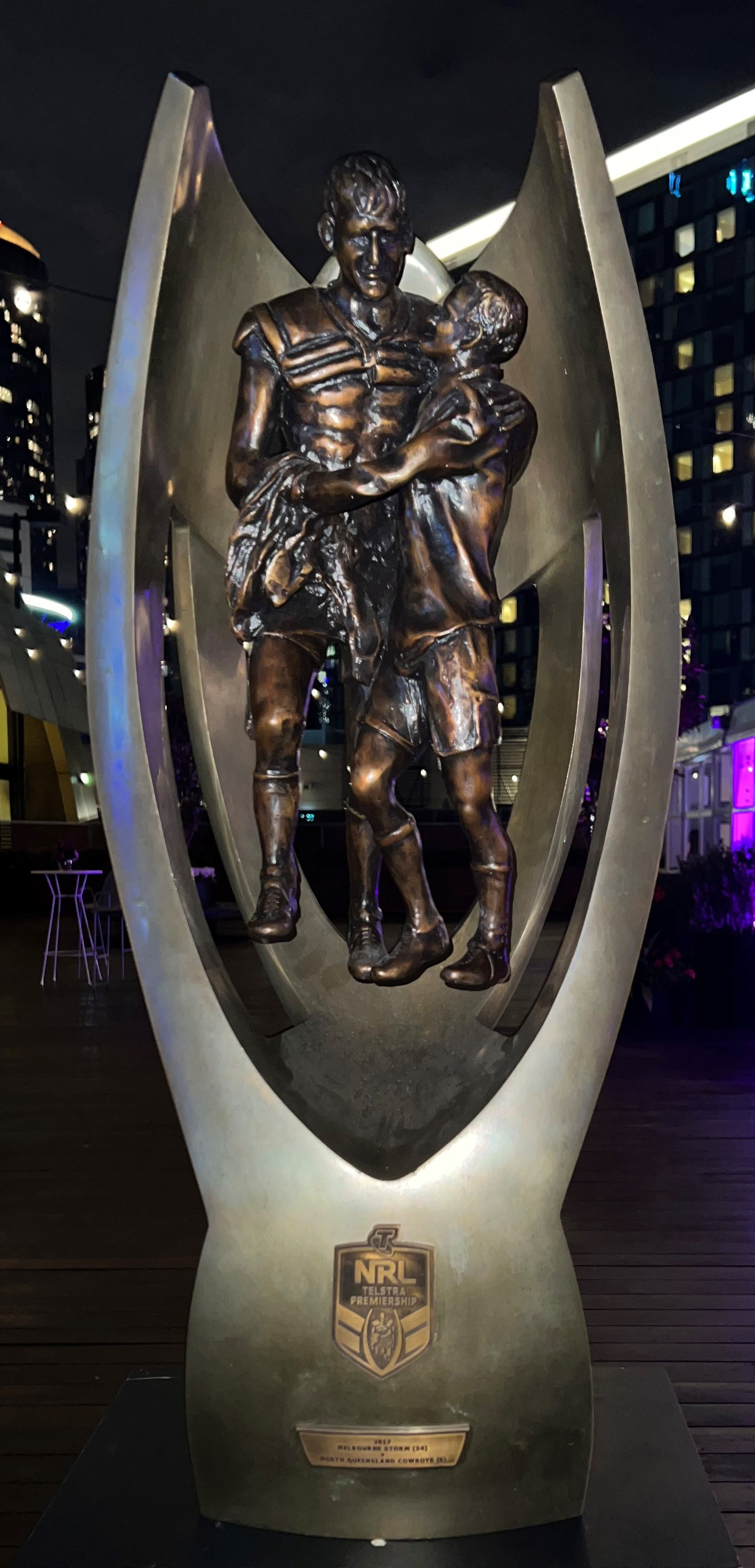
2017 Provan-Summons Trophy

- Grand Final – The Melbourne Storm defeat the North Queensland Cowboys 34–6 to win the 2017 Premiership, Billy Slater claimed his second Clive Churchill Medal. The match was notable for it being Cooper Cronk's final game for the Melbourne Storm. Other departing players from the Grand Final side were Tohu Harris, Slade Griffin and Jordan McLean.

=== Milestone games ===
Round	Player	Milestone
Round 1	Ryley Jacks	NRL debut
Round 1	Josh Addo-Carr	Storm debut
Round 1	Will Chambers	150th Game
Round 2	Vincent Leuluai	Storm debut
Round 2	Joe Stimson	NRL debut
Round 2	Cameron Smith	2000 Career Points
Round 5	Mark Nicholls	Storm debut
Round 5	Tui Kamikamica	NRL debut
Round 9	Cameron Munster	50th Game
Round 10	Billy Slater	700 Career Points
Round 13	Felise Kaufusi	50th Game
Round 13	Brandon Smith	NRL debut
Round 15	Dean Britt	NRL debut
Round 16	Jahrome Hughes	Storm debut
Round 18	Nate Myles	Storm debut
Round 21	Cameron Smith	350th Game
Round 26	Nelson Asofa-Solomona	50th Game
Finals week 1	Cameron Smith	356th Game (new NRL Record)
Finals week 3	Cameron Smith	1000th Goal

== Fixtures ==
=== Pre-season ===
Date	Round	Opponent	Venue	Result	Mel.	Opp.	Source
4 February	Auckland Nines Pool Games	Brisbane Broncos	Eden Park, Auckland, New Zealand	Loss	4	18	
4 February	Auckland Nines Pool Games	Wests Tigers	Eden Park, Auckland, New Zealand	Win	14	6	
5 February	Auckland Nines Pool Games	Newcastle Knights	Eden Park, Auckland, New Zealand	Win	20	10	
5 February	Auckland Nines Quarter-final	North Queensland Cowboys	Eden Park, Auckland, New Zealand	Win	25	12	
5 February	Auckland Nines Semi-final	Sydney Roosters	Eden Park, Auckland, New Zealand	Loss	16	21	
11 February	Trial	New Zealand Warriors	Sunshine Coast Stadium, Sunshine Coast	Win	30	18	
18 February	Trial	Canterbury Bankstown Bulldogs	North Hobart Oval, Hobart	Loss	24	28	

=== Regular season ===
==== Result by round ====
Round	1	2	3	4	5	6	7	8	9	10	11	12	13	14	15	16	17	18	19	20	21	22	23	24	25	26
Ground	A	A	H	A	H	H	A	H	A	N	A	–	H	A	H	A	A	H	–	A	H	A	H	A	H	H
Result	W	W	W	W	W	L	W	W	W	L	W	B	W	W	W	L	W	L	B	W	W	W	W	W	W	W
Position	6	2	1	2	1	2	2	1	1	1	1	1	1	1	1	1	1	1	1	1	1	1	1	1	1	1
Points	2	4	6	8	10	10	12	14	16	16	18	20	22	24	26	26	28	28	30	32	34	36	38	40	42	44

Source: Rugby League Tables
A = Away; H = Home; N = Neutral; B = Bye; W = Win; D = Draw; L = Loss

==== Matches ====
All Melbourne Storm home matches in 2017 were played at AAMI Park, with the exception of the round 10 match against the Gold Coast Titans which was played at Suncorp Stadium in Brisbane. The game was part of a double header with the Brisbane Broncos vs. Manly Sea Eagles game being played immediately after.

- (g.p.) – Golden Point extra time
- (pen) – Penalty try

Date	Rd	Opponent	Venue	Result	Mel.	Opp.	Tries	Goals	Field goals	Ref
3 March	1	Canterbury Bankstown Bulldogs	Belmore Sports Ground, Sydney	Won	12	6	C Blair, S Vunivalu	C Smith 2/3		
10 March	2	New Zealand Warriors	Mt Smart Stadium, Auckland	Won	26	10	K Bromwich, C Blair, S Vunivalu, C Cronk	C Smith 5/5		
16 March	3	Brisbane Broncos	AAMI Park, Melbourne	Won	14	12	R Jacks, J Addo-Carr	C Smith 3/3		
26 March	4	Wests Tigers	Leichhardt Oval, Sydney	Won	22	14	N Asofa-Solomona, Y Tonumaipea, C Blair, J Addo-Carr	C Smith 3/4		
1 April	5	Penrith Panthers	AAMI Park, Melbourne	Won	28	6	S Vunivalu (2), W Chambers, C Cronk, J Addo-Carr	C Smith 4/6		
9 April	6	Cronulla Sharks	AAMI Park, Melbourne	Lost	2	11		C Smith 1/1		
15 April	7	Manly Sea Eagles	Brookvale Oval, Sydney	Won	30	26	S Vunivalu (2), F Kaufusi (2), Y Tonumaipea, J Addo-Carr	C Smith 3/6		
25 April	8	New Zealand Warriors	AAMI Park, Melbourne	Won	20	14	N Asofa-Solomona, C Cronk, J Addo-Carr, F Kaufusi	C Smith 2/5		
30 April	9	St George-Illawarra Dragons	WIN Stadium, Wollongong	Won	34	22	S Vunivalu (2), J Addo-Carr (2), B Slater (2)	C Smith 5/6		
13 May	10	Gold Coast Titans	Suncorp Stadium, Brisbane	Lost	36	38	C Cronk (2), B Slater, W Chambers, J Stimson, C Blair	C Smith 6/6		
21 May	11	South Sydney Rabbitohs	NIB Stadium, Perth	Won	14	6	W Chambers, J Addo-Carr, S Vunivalu	C Smith 1/3		
28 May	12	Bye								
2 June	13	Newcastle Knights	AAMI Park, Melbourne	Won	40	12	S Vunivalu (2), B Slater (2), J Addo-Carr, F Kaufusi, B Smith, C Blair	C Munster 4/8		
8 June	14	Cronulla Sharks	Southern Cross Group Stadium, Sydney	Won	18	13	F Kaufusi (2), T Glasby	C Smith 3/3		
17 June	15	North Queensland Cowboys	AAMI Park, Melbourne	Won (g.p.)	23	22	C Scott (2), B Smith, F Kaufusi	C Munster 3/4	B Croft 1/1	
24 June	16	Sydney Roosters	Adelaide Oval, Adelaide	Lost (g.p.)	24	25	J Addo-Carr (2), S Vunivalu, J Hughes, B Croft	C Munster 2/5		
30 June	17	Brisbane Broncos	Suncorp Stadium, Brisbane	Won	42	12	S Vunivalu (2), J Addo-Carr (2), C Scott (2), C Smith, B Slater	C Smith 5/8		
8 July	18	Parramatta Eels	AAMI Park, Melbourne	Lost	6	22	J Hughes	J Stimson 1/1		
17 July	19	Bye								
22 July	20	Canberra Raiders	GIO Stadium, Canberra	Won	20	14	D Finucane (2), W Chambers	C Smith 2/2, C Munster 2/4		
30 July	21	Manly Sea Eagles	AAMI Park, Melbourne	Won	40	6	J Hughes, S Vunivalu, J Stimson, K Bromwich, W Chambers, C Cronk, J Addo-Carr	C Smith 6/8		
4 August	22	North Queensland Cowboys	1300SMILES Stadium, Townsville	Won	26	8	J Addo-Carr (2), S Vunivalu (2), W Chambers	C Smith 3/4, W Chambers 0/1		
12 August	23	Sydney Roosters	AAMI Park, Melbourne	Won	16	13	S Vunivalu (pen), J Stimson	C Smith 4/5		
19 August	24	Newcastle Knights	McDonald Jones Stadium, Newcastle	Won	44	12	B Croft (3), C Scott, D Finucane, W Chambers, S Vunivalu, N Asofa-Solomona	C Smith 5/7, D Finucane 1/1		
26 August	25	South Sydney Rabbitohs	AAMI Park, Melbourne	Won	64	6	S Vunivalu (2), S Vunivalu (pen), J Addo-Carr (3), C Munster, C Smith, B Slater, T Glasby, T Harris	C Smith 9/9, C Munster 1/2		
2 September	26	Canberra Raiders	AAMI Park, Melbourne	Won	32	6	T Harris (2), F Kaufusi, J Bromwich, S Vunivalu	C Smith 6/6		

=== Finals ===
Date	Round	Opponent	Venue	Result	Mel.	Opp.	Tries	Goals	Field Goals	Report
9 September	Week 1 - Qualifying Final	Parramatta Eels	AAMI Park, Melbourne	Win	18	16	J Addo-Carr, K Bromwich, B Slater	C Smith 3/4		
22 September	Week 3 - Preliminary Final	Brisbane Broncos	AAMI Park, Melbourne	Win	30	0	B Slater (2), J Addo-Carr, N Asofa-Solomona	C Smith 6/6, T Harris 1/1		
1 October	Week 4 - Grand Final	North Queensland Cowboys	ANZ Stadium, Sydney	Win	34	6	J Addo-Carr (2), F Kaufusi, B Slater, D Finucane, C Scott	C Smith 5/6		

=== Ladder ===
2017 NRL season
Pos	Team	Pld	W	D	L	B	PF	PA	PD	Pts
1	Melbourne Storm (P)	24	20	0	4	2	633	336	+297	44
2	Sydney Roosters	24	17	0	7	2	500	428	+72	38
3	Brisbane Broncos	24	16	0	8	2	597	433	+164	36
4	Parramatta Eels	24	16	0	8	2	496	457	+39	36
5	Cronulla-Sutherland Sharks	24	15	0	9	2	476	407	+69	34
6	Manly-Warringah Sea Eagles	24	14	0	10	2	552	512	+40	32
7	Penrith Panthers	24	13	0	11	2	504	459	+45	30
8	North Queensland Cowboys	24	13	0	11	2	467	443	+24	30
9	St. George Illawarra Dragons	24	12	0	12	2	533	450	+83	28
10	Canberra Raiders	24	11	0	13	2	558	497	+61	26
11	Canterbury-Bankstown Bulldogs	24	10	0	14	2	360	455	−95	24
12	South Sydney Rabbitohs	24	9	0	15	2	464	564	−100	22
13	New Zealand Warriors	24	7	0	17	2	444	575	−131	18
14	Wests Tigers	24	7	0	17	2	413	571	−158	18
15	Gold Coast Titans	24	7	0	17	2	448	638	−190	18
16	Newcastle Knights	24	5	0	19	2	428	648	−220	14

== 2017 Coaching staff ==
- Craig Bellamy - Head Coach
- Adam O’Brien - Assistant Coach
- Jason Ryles - Assistant Coach
- Eric Smith - U/20s Head Coach
- Marc Brentnall – Development Coach
- Aaron Bellamy – Development Coach
- Frank Ponissi - Football Director
- Nick Maxwell - Leadership Coach
- Craig McRae – Kicking & Catching Coach

== 2017 Squad ==
List current as of 3 July 2017

Cap	Nat.	Player name	Position	First Storm game	Previous First Grade RL club (Note: Previous First Grade RL club: This column denotes the previous RL club the player was signed to and played first grade RL for. If they are yet to debut then this is stipulated. If they were merely signed to the club but did not play then it is not counted)
55	(Australia)	Cameron Smith (c)	HK	2002	(Australia) Melbourne Storm
58	(Australia)	Billy Slater	FB	2003	(Australia) Melbourne Storm
73	(Australia)	Cooper Cronk	HB	2004	(Australia) Melbourne Storm
97	(Australia)	Will Chambers	CE	2007	(Australia) Melbourne Storm
119	(New Zealand)	Jesse Bromwich	PR	2010	(Australia) Melbourne Storm
128	(Australia)	Robbie Rochow	SR	2010	(Australia) South Sydney Rabbitohs
144	(New Zealand)	Tohu Harris	SR, LK, FE	2013	(Australia) Melbourne Storm
147	(New Zealand)	Slade Griffin	HK, LK	2013	(Australia) Melbourne Storm
149	(New Zealand)	Kenny Bromwich	PR, SR, LK	2013	(Australia) Melbourne Storm
150	(Australia)	Jordan McLean	PR	2013	(Australia) Melbourne Storm
153	(Australia)	Tim Glasby	PR, SR	2013	(Australia) Melbourne Storm
154	(Samoa)	Young Tonumaipea	WG, FB	2014	(Australia) Melbourne Storm
160	(Australia)	Cameron Munster	FE, FB, HB	2014	(Australia) Melbourne Storm
163	(Australia)	Dale Finucane	PR, SR, LK	2015	(Australia) Canterbury Bulldogs
164	(Tonga)	Felise Kaufusi	PR	2015	(Australia) Melbourne Storm
166	(New Zealand)	Nelson Asofa-Solomona	SR, PR	2015	(Australia) Melbourne Storm
167	(Australia)	Christian Welch	SR, PR	2015	(Australia) Melbourne Storm
170	(Australia)	Curtis Scott	CE, WG	2016	(Australia) Melbourne Storm
171	(Fiji)	Suliasi Vunivalu	WG	2016	(Australia) Melbourne Storm
172	(Australia)	Cheyse Blair	WG, CE	2016	(Australia) Manly Sea Eagles
174	(Australia)	Brodie Croft	HB	2016	(Australia) Melbourne Storm
176	(Australia)	Josh Addo-Carr	WG, FB	2017	(Australia) Wests Tigers
177	(Canada)	Ryley Jacks	FE	2017	(Australia) Melbourne Storm
178	(Australia)	Vincent Leuluai	SR, PR	2017	(Australia) Sydney Roosters
179	(Australia)	Joe Stimson	SR, LK	2017	(Australia) Melbourne Storm
180	(Australia)	Mark Nicholls	PR, SR	2017	(Australia) Canberra Raiders
181	(Fiji)	Tui Kamikamica	SR, PR	2017	(Australia) Melbourne Storm
182	(New Zealand)	Brandon Smith	HK	2017	(Australia) Melbourne Storm
183	(Australia)	Dean Britt	SR, LK	2017	(Australia) Melbourne Storm
184	(New Zealand)	Jahrome Hughes	FE, FB	2017	(Australia) North Queensland Cowboys
185	(Australia)	Nate Myles	PR, SR, LK	2017	(Australia) Manly Warringah Sea Eagles
—N/a	(Australia)	Scott Drinkwater	FB	Yet to debut	(Australia) Melbourne Storm
—N/a	(Papua New Guinea)	Justin Olam	WG, CE	Yet to debut	(Australia) Melbourne Storm
—N/a	(New Zealand)	Jeremy Hawkins	WG, CE	Yet to debut	(Australia) Canberra Raiders
—N/a	(Australia)	Jake Turpin	HK	Yet to debut	(Australia) Melbourne Storm
—N/a	(Samoa)	Charlie Galo	PR, SR	Yet to debut	(Australia) Melbourne Storm

== 2017 Premiership Team ==
Melbourne Storm
2017 Premiership Team	Interchange	Coach
1 Billy Slater – FB; 2 Suliasi Vunivalu – WG; 3 Will Chambers – CE; 4 Curtis Scott – CE; 5 Josh Addo-Carr – WG; 6 Cameron Munster – FE; 7 Cooper Cronk – HB; 8 Jesse Bromwich – PR; 9 Cameron Smith (c) – HK; 10 Jordan McLean – PR; 11 Felise Kaufusi – SR; 12 Tohu Harris – SR; 13 Dale Finucane – LK	14 Kenny Bromwich; 15 Tim Glasby; 16 Nelson Asofa-Solomona; 17 Slade Griffin	Head coach: Craig Bellamy; Legend: (c) Captain(s); (vc) Vice-captain(s)

== Player movements ==
Losses

- Blake Green to Manly-Warringah Sea Eagles
- Ben Hampton to North Queensland Cowboys
- Richie Kennar to Canterbury-Bankstown Bulldogs
- Josh Kerr to St George Illawarra Dragons
- Marika Koroibete to Melbourne Rebels (rugby union)
- Ryan Morgan to St Helens
- Kevin Proctor to Gold Coast Titans
- Ben Nakubuwai to Gold Coast Titans
- Francis Tualau to Canterbury-Bankstown Bulldogs
- Tony Tumusa to released
- Matthew White to released
- Dean Britt to South Sydney Rabbitohs (mid season)

Gains

- Josh Addo-Carr from Wests Tigers
- Jahrome Hughes from North Queensland Cowboys
- Ryley Jacks from Sunshine Coast Falcons
- Vincent Leuluai from Sydney Roosters
- Brandon Smith from North Queensland Cowboys
- Nate Myles from Manly Warringah Sea Eagles (mid season)
- Robbie Rochow from South Sydney Rabbitohs (mid season)

== Representative honours ==
The following players have played a first grade representative match in 2017.

- (C) = Captain

Player	2017 All Stars match	City vs Country	Mid-season Tests (Note: Rugby League international weekend consisted of four games being played over the weekend of 5–7 May. This included the 2017 Anzac Test (Australia vs. New Zealand) and the three Pacific Tests (Fiji vs. Tonga, Papua New Guinea vs. Cook Islands and England vs. Samoa). In addition a Junior Kangaroos vs. Junior Kiwis (Under 20s) game was also played as a curtain raiser to the ANZAC test Curtis Scott and Brodie Croft were selected to play for the Junior Kangaroos with Croft chosen as captain. Players that were selected in the squads but did not play are not listed)	State of Origin 1	State of Origin 2	State of Origin 3	World Cup (Note: Players listed here have played at least one World Cup match for their nation. Australia named seven Melbourne players including Felise Kaufusi who earlier this year played for Tonga.)
Josh Addo-Carr	—N/a	City	—N/a	—N/a	—N/a	—N/a	—N/a
Nelson Asofa-Solomona	—N/a	—N/a	—N/a	—N/a	—N/a	—N/a	New Zealand
Cheyse Blair	—N/a	Country	—N/a	—N/a	—N/a	—N/a	—N/a
Jesse Bromwich	—N/a	—N/a	New Zealand (C)	—N/a	—N/a	—N/a	—N/a
Kenny Bromwich	—N/a	—N/a	New Zealand	—N/a	—N/a	—N/a	New Zealand
Will Chambers	—N/a	—N/a	Australia	Queensland	Queensland	Queensland	Australia
Cooper Cronk	—N/a	—N/a	Australia	Queensland	Queensland	Queensland	Australia
Dale Finucane	—N/a	Country	—N/a	—N/a	—N/a	—N/a	—N/a
Tim Glasby	—N/a	—N/a	—N/a	—N/a	Queensland	Queensland	—N/a
Tui Kamikamica	—N/a	—N/a	Fiji	—N/a	—N/a	—N/a	Fiji
Felise Kaufusi	—N/a	—N/a	Tonga	—N/a	—N/a	—N/a	Australia
Jordan McLean	World All Stars	—N/a	—N/a	—N/a	—N/a	—N/a	Australia
Cameron Munster	—N/a	—N/a	—N/a	—N/a	—N/a	Queensland	Australia
Justin Olam	—N/a	—N/a	Papua New Guinea	—N/a	—N/a	—N/a	Papua New Guinea
Billy Slater	—N/a	—N/a	—N/a	—N/a	Queensland	Queensland	Australia
Cameron Smith	—N/a	—N/a	Australia (C)	Queensland (C)	Queensland (C)	Queensland (C)	Australia (C)
Young Tonumaipea	—N/a	—N/a	—N/a	—N/a	—N/a	—N/a	Samoa
Suliasi Vunivalu	—N/a	—N/a	Fiji	—N/a	—N/a	—N/a	Fiji

== Statistics ==
This table contains playing statistics for all Melbourne Storm players to have played in the 2017 NRL season.

- Table updated as at end of season
- Statistics sources:

Name	Appearances	Tries	Goals	Field goals	Points
Josh Addo-Carr	27	23	0	0	92
Nelson Asofa-Solomona	26	4	0	0	16
Cheyse Blair	13	5	0	0	20
Dean Britt	1	0	0	0	0
Jesse Bromwich	23	1	0	0	4
Kenny Bromwich	26	3	0	0	12
Will Chambers	23	7	0 (Note: Goalkicking percentage 0% (0/1))	0	28
Brodie Croft	4	4	0	1	17
Cooper Cronk	22	7	0	0	28
Dale Finucane	26	4	1 (Note: Goalkicking percentage 100% (1/1))	0	18
Tim Glasby	23	2	0	0	8
Slade Griffen	14	0	0	0	0
Tohu Harris	14	3	1 (Note: Goalkicking percentage 100% (1/1))	0	14
Jahrome Hughes	4	3	0	0	12
Ryley Jacks	12	1	0	0	4
Tui Kamikamica	2	0	0	0	0
Felise Kaufusi	27	9	0	0	36
Vincent Leuluai	2	0	0	0	0
Jordan McLean	20	0	0	0	0
Cameron Munster	21	1	12 (Note: Goalkicking percentage 52.17% (12/23))	0	28
Nate Myles	3	0	0	0	0
Mark Nicholls	9	0	0	0	0
Robbie Rochow	1	0	0	0	0
Curtis Scott	13	6	0	0	24
Billy Slater	21	11	0	0	44
Brandon Smith	3	2	0	0	8
Cameron Smith	23	2	92 (Note: Goalkicking percentage 79.31% (92/116))	0	192
Joe Stimson	15	3	1 (Note: Goalkicking percentage 100% (1/1))	0	14
Young Tonumaipea	6	2	0	0	8
Suliasi Vunivalu	26	23	0	0	92
Christian Welch	8	0	0	0	0
31 players used	—	125	107	1	715

=== Scorers ===
Most points in a game: 22 points (Note: This score was a new personal best by Cameron Smith)

- Round 25 – Cameron Smith (1 try, 9 goals) vs South Sydney Rabbitohs

Most tries in a game: 3

- Round 24 – Brodie Croft vs Newcastle Knights
- Round 25 – Suliasi Vunivalu vs South Sydney Rabbitohs
- Round 25 – Josh Addo-Carr vs South Sydney Rabbitohs

=== Winning games ===
Highest score in a winning game: 64 points

- Round 25 vs South Sydney Rabbitohs

Lowest score in a winning game: 12 points

- Round 1 vs Canterbury-Bankstown Bulldogs

Greatest winning margin: 58 points

- Round 25 vs South Sydney Rabbitohs

Greatest number of games won consecutively: 10

- Round 20 to 2017 Grand Final (unbroken streak)

=== Losing games ===
Highest score in a losing game: 36 points (Note: This equalled the league record for the highest score in a losing game.)

- Round 10 vs Gold Coast Titans

Lowest score in a losing game: 2 points

- Round 6 vs Cronulla Sharks

Greatest losing margin: 16 points

- Round 18 vs Parramatta Eels

Greatest number of games lost consecutively: 1

== Jersey ==
In November 2016, the club announced that it had signed a new deal with ISC to provide all their high quality apparel to Storm players, coaches, staff and fans for the next five years. They also announced that while the ISC logo will now appear in the jersey the actual design of the home and away strips will remain the same from 2016. Melbourne Storm only 12 months earlier signed a five-year deal with Star Athletic to provide all of its apparel; however it is unclear as to why this deal ended after only one year.

Jersey choice
RD1	RD2	RD3	RD4	RD5	RD6	RD7	RD8	RD9	RD10	RD11	RD12	RD13	RD14	RD15	RD16	RD17	RD18	RD19	RD20	RD21	RD22	RD23	RD24	RD25	RD26	QF	SF	PF	GF
Home	Clash	Home	Clash	Thor^{#}	Home	Clash	Home^	Home	Indigenous^^	Clash	—	Home	Home	Home	Clash	Clash	Home	—	Home	Heritage^{%}	Clash	Home	Clash	WIL^{&}	Home	CAM356^{@}	—	Home	Home

^{#} ISC Marvel Heroes promotional jersey designed to look like Thor.
^ Added ANZAC Appeal logo.
^^ Designed by Dixon Patten.
^{%} Replica of 2007 NRL Grand Final jersey.
^{&} Women in League jersey — similar design to the eventual 2018 clash jersey, but in navy and pink.
^{@} Home jersey with added logos celebrating Cameron Smith breaking Darren Lockyer's NRL games record.

== Awards ==
=== Trophy Cabinet ===
- 2017 J. J. Giltinan Shield
- 2017 Provan-Summons Trophy
- 2017 Michael Moore Trophy

=== Melbourne Storm Awards Night ===
Held at Crown Palladium on Tuesday 3 October.

- Melbourne Storm Player of the Year: Cameron Smith
- Melbourne Storm Rookie of the Year: Curtis Scott
- Melbourne Storm Members' Player of Year: Cameron Smith
- Melbourne Storm Most Improved: Felise Kaufusi
- Melbourne Storm Best Back: Will Chambers
- Melbourne Storm Best Forward: Jesse Bromwich
- Cooper Cronk Feeder Club Player of the Year: Brodie Croft
- Darren Bell U20s Player of the Year: Harry Grant
- U20s Best Forward: Louis Geraghty
- U20's Best Back: Jesse Arthurs
- Greg Brentnall Young Achievers Trophy: Jordin Leiu
- Michael Moore Club Person of the Year: Cooper Cronk
- Life Member Inductee: Frank Ponnisi
- Chairman's Award: Daniel Giese
- Best try: Kenny Bromwich, qualifying final v Parramatta

=== Dally M Awards Night ===
Melbourne Storm players walked away from rugby league's Dally M awards on 27 September 2017 with a total of six Dally M awards.

- Dally M Medal: Cameron Smith
- Dally M Captain of the Year: Cameron Smith
- Dally M Coach of the Year: Craig Bellamy
- Dally M Fullback of the Year: Billy Slater
- Dally M Hooker of the Year: Cameron Smith
- Dally M Top Try Scorer (Regular season): Suliasi Vunivalu

=== Rugby League Players Association Awards Night ===
- RLPA Hooker of the Year: Cameron Smith
- RLPA NYC Player of the Year: Harry Grant
- RLPA Australian Representative Player of the Year: Cameron Smith

=== Rugby League World Golden Boot Awards Night ===
- Golden Boot Award: Cameron Smith

=== Additional Awards ===
- I Don't Quit Iron Bar: Brandon Smith
- Clive Churchill Medal: Billy Slater
- Sprit of ANZAC Medal: Nelson Asofa-Solomona
- New Zealand Kiwi Rookie of the Year: Nelson Asofa-Solomona
