= 2018 World Club Challenge =

Rugby league competition

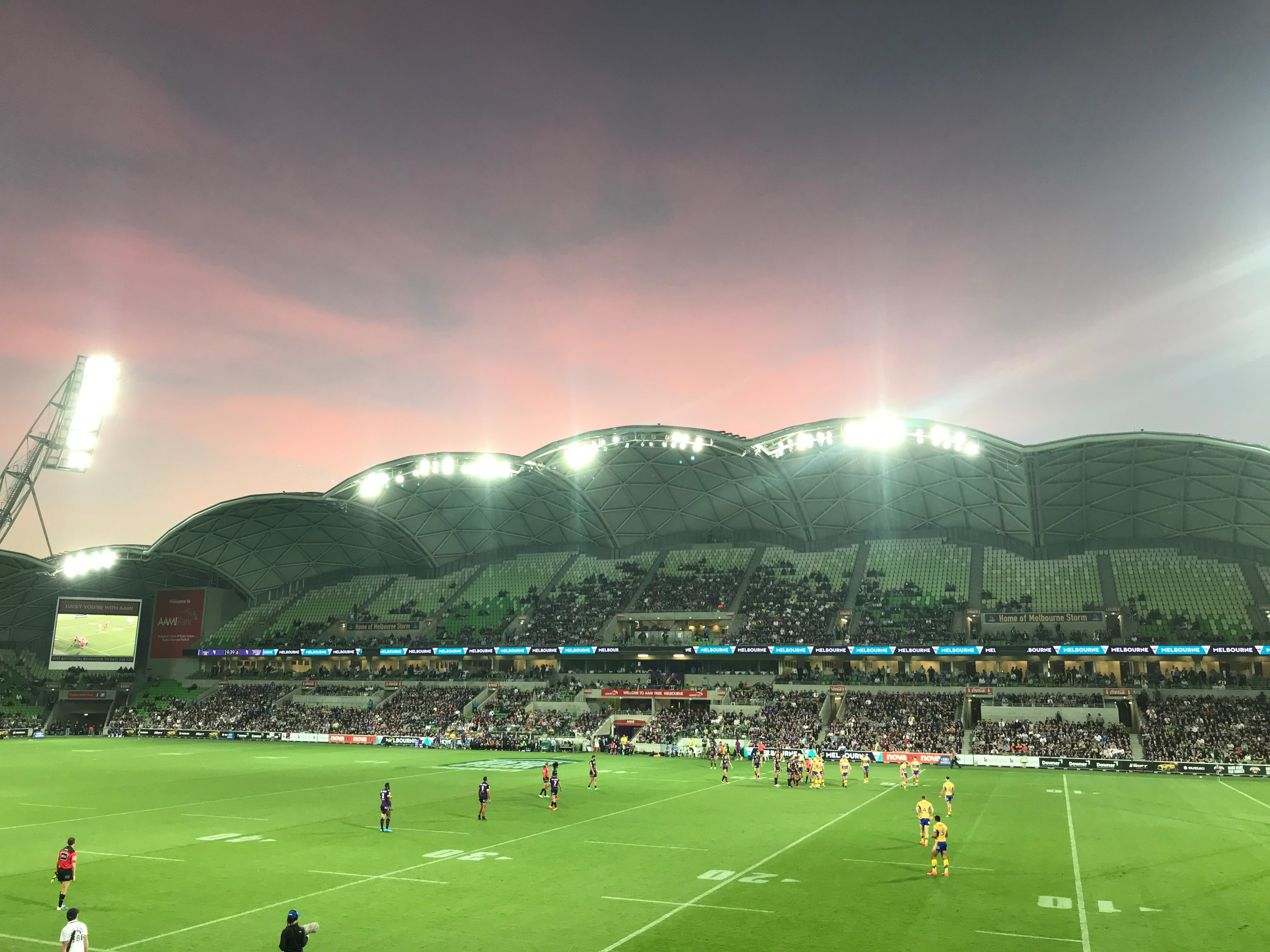
- Melbourne Rectangular Stadium during the match
Melbourne Storm	Leeds Rhinos
(NRL)	(Super League)
38	4
	1	2	Total
MEL	18	20	38
LEE	4	0	4
- Date: 16 February 2018
- Stadium: Melbourne Rectangular Stadium
- Location: Melbourne, Australia
- Man of the Match: Nelson Asofa-Solomona
- Referee: Gerard Sutton (Australia); Ben Cummins (Australia)
- Attendance: 19,062

Broadcast partners
- Broadcasters: (Australia) Nine Network; (United Kingdom) Sky Sports; (New Zealand) Māori Television

The 2018 World Club Challenge (also known as the 2018 Downer World Club Challenge was the 26th staging of the World Club Challenge. It took place on 16 February 2018, and featured Super League champions Leeds Rhinos, and NRL winners Melbourne Storm. This was the fourth time the two clubs have met in the World Club Challenge, having previously played each other in 2008, 2010 and 2013. It was the first time since 2014 and only the fourth time since the World Club Challenge began that the game was played in Australia.

Melbourne Storm defeated Leeds Rhinos, 38–4 to be crowned World Club Champions for 2018.

== Background ==
In October 2017 it was suggested that the 2018 World Club Series could be scrapped completely based on the top Australian teams' reluctance to travel to the UK for the 2017 series which resulted in the series being scaled back to two games only. In particular the second game of the 2017 series only featured an invited team from the NRL. In addition, the 2017 Rugby League World Cup being played in Australia at the end of 2017, meant that the preseason for Australian teams was going to be unusually short ahead of the 2018 season and therefore they did not want to make the trip to England for the 2018 series. The Melbourne Storm (2017 NRL Premiers) in particular, were reluctant to travel meaning the series was in danger of cancellation for the first time since the 1990s as it is the Storm that was playing in the World Club Challenge.

In June 2017, the Super League announced that the Australian city of Wollongong would host the first ever Super League game outside Europe. Wigan Warriors "hosted" Hull F.C. in the game at WIN Stadium on Saturday, February 10, in which the Warriors prevailed, 24–10. In addition and as part of this trip to Australia, Wigan and Hull would play two exhibition games against South Sydney Rabbitohs and St George Illawarra Dragons respectively. Early media speculation suggested a switch to Melbourne for the World Club Challenge and that these fixtures could form part of the World club Series; however, as these were separately arranged fixtures they were ultimately not considered part of the World Club Series.

On 14 November 2017, it was confirmed that Leeds Rhinos would travel to Australia to play Melbourne Storm at AAMI Park in Melbourne on 16 February 2018, and that the World Club Challenge would return to a single game for the first time since 2014.

=== Leeds Rhinos ===
Leeds finished Super League XXII's regular season in 2nd place and went on to defeat 1st-placed Castleford Tigers, 24–6, in the grand final, qualifying the Rhinos for their 8th World Club Challenge.

=== Melbourne Storm ===
The Storm finished the 2017 NRL season in 1st place and won the Minor premiership. They then went undefeated through the finals series to claim the 2017 Premiership with a 34–6 win in the 2017 NRL Grand Final over the North Queensland Cowboys, qualifying Melbourne for their fifth World Club Challenge, and first since 2013.

== Teams ==
The Melbourne Storm made their team announcement on 13 February 2018.

Team details
Melbourne Storm		Position	Leeds Rhinos
Name	Number	Position	Number	Name
Billy Slater	1	FB	24	Jack Walker
Suliasi Vunivalu	2	WG	2	Tom Briscoe
Will Chambers	3	CE	3	Kallum Watkins
Curtis Scott	4	CE	4	Liam Sutcliffe
Josh Addo-Carr	5	WG	5	Ryan Hall
Cameron Munster	6	FE/SO	6	Joel Moon
Brodie Croft	7	HB/SH	7	Richie Myler
Jesse Bromwich	8	PR	8	Adam Cuthbertson
Cameron Smith	9	HK	9	Matt Parcell
Tim Glasby	10	PF	10	Brad Singleton
Felise Kaufusi	11	SR	11	Jamie Jones-Buchanan
Ryan Hoffman	12	SR	12	Carl Ablett
Dale Finucane	13	LK/LF	13	Stevie Ward
Brandon Smith	14	IN	14	Brad Dwyer
Nelson Asofa Solomona	15	IN	15	Brett Delaney
Kenny Bromwich	16	IN	18	Jimmy Keinhorst
Christian Welch	17	IN	23	Jack Ormondroyd
(Australia) Craig Bellamy		Coach		(England) Brian McClennan
Storm RLP

== Match details ==
2018 World Club Challenge

16 February 2018
20:00 AEDT (UTC+11)

Melbourne Storm	38 – 4	Leeds Rhinos
Tries: 7 J Bromwich 17'; Croft 24'; Vunivalu 40'; Asofa-Solomona 49'; Kaufusi 56'; Chambers 71'; Finucane 80'; Goals: 5/8; C Smith 25', pen 36', 40', 50' (4/7); Munster 80' (1/1)	1st: 18–4; 2nd: 20–0; Report	Tries: 1 Hall 9'; Goals: 0/1; Watkins (0/1)

AAMI Park, Melbourne
Attendance: 19,062
Referee: Gerard Sutton, Ben Cummins
Player of the Match: Nelson Asofa-Solomona

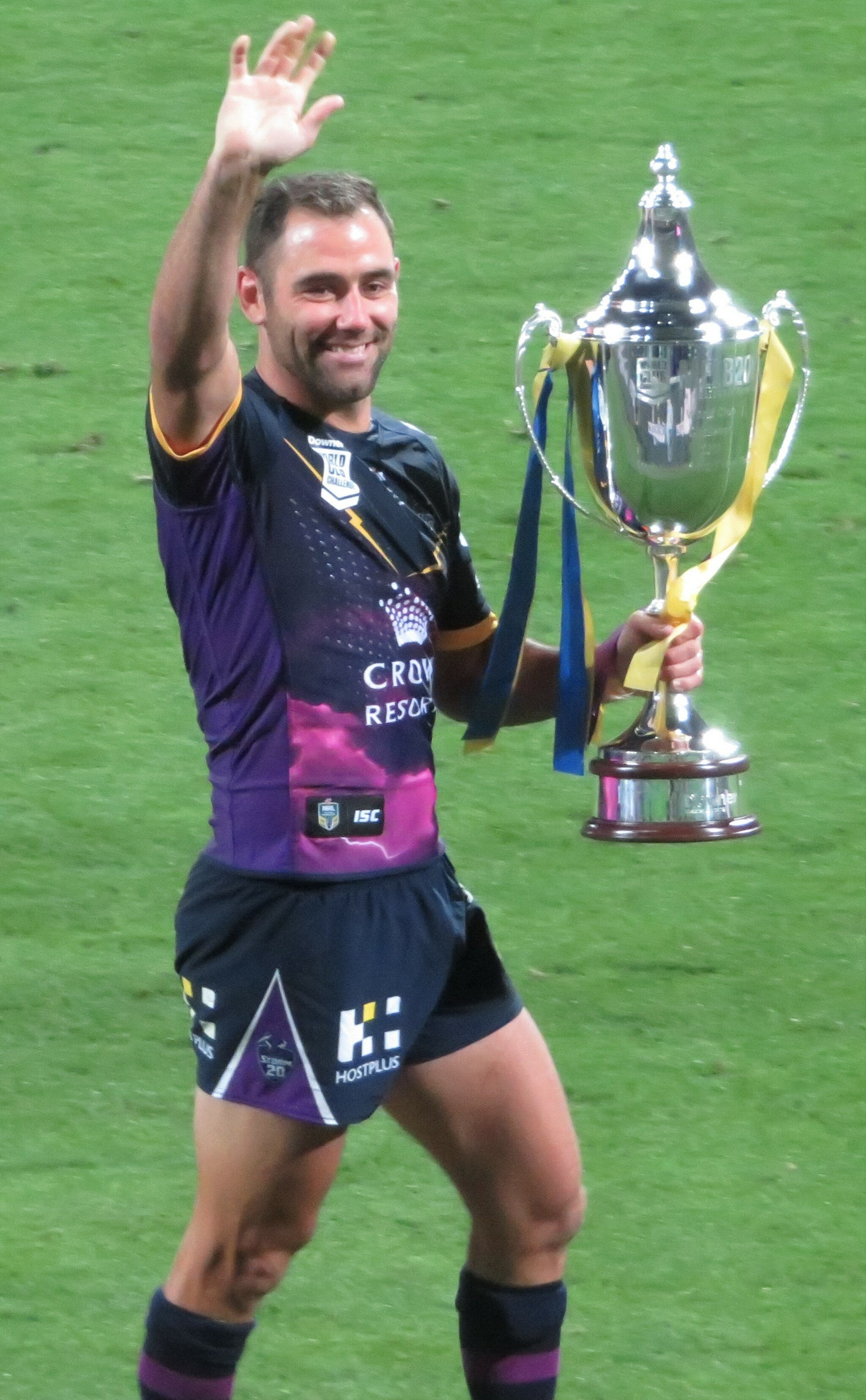
Cameron Smith with the trophy
