= Nelson Asofa-Solomona =

New Zealand international rugby league footballer

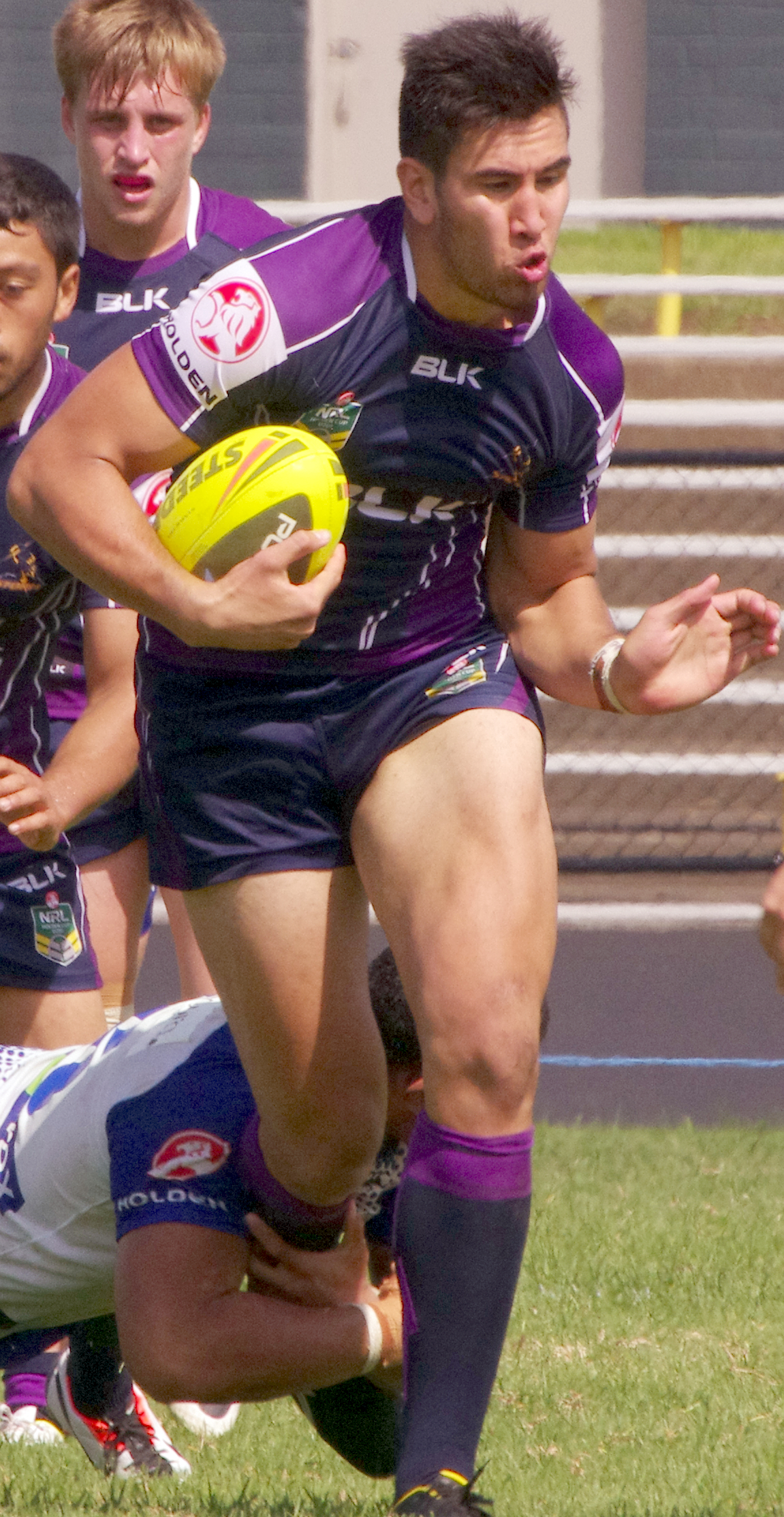

Personal information
- Born: 29 February 1996 (age 30) Wellington, New Zealand
- Height: 200 cm (6 ft 7 in)
- Weight: 139 kg (21 st 12 lb)

Playing information
- Position: Prop
Club
Years	Team	Pld	T	G	FG	P
2015–25	Melbourne Storm	215	35	0	0	140
Representative
Years	Team	Pld	T	G	FG	P
2017–25	New Zealand	16	3	0	0	12
- Source: As of 22 November 2026
- Relatives: Ken Maumalo (cousin)

Nelson Asofa-Solomona (born 29 February 1996) is a former New Zealand professional rugby league footballer who last played as a prop for the Melbourne Storm in the National Rugby League (NRL) and New Zealand at international level.

Asofa-Solomona won the 2017 NRL Grand Final and the 2020 NRL Grand Final with Melbourne.

== Early life ==
Asofa-Solomona was born in Wellington, New Zealand, both of his parents having moved there from their native birthplace Samoa He is the first cousin of former NRL wing Ken Maumalo.

Asofa-Solomona grew up playing rugby union for Upper Hutt Rams before playing rugby league. He played his junior rugby league for the Upper Hutt Tigers and Wellington Orcas junior representative team while playing rugby union at Wellington College. He was then signed by the Melbourne Storm at 15 years of age.

== Personal life ==
Asofa-Solomona briefly trialled veganism, however found it did not work with his dietary requirements. Asofa-Solomona has, on multiple occasions, spoken of the influences his family has had on him throughout the years. In 2018, he stated that being able to provide for his family was one of the main perks of playing rugby league for the Melbourne Storm. Asofa-Solomona has several tattoos, notably two Samoan designs - one on his right leg and one covering his right forearm. He has stated that the flowers in his leg design are a tribute to his sisters and the women in his life. Asofa-Solomona has four dogs: two dachshunds, a husky & a Staffordshire bull terrier.

== Rugby League ==
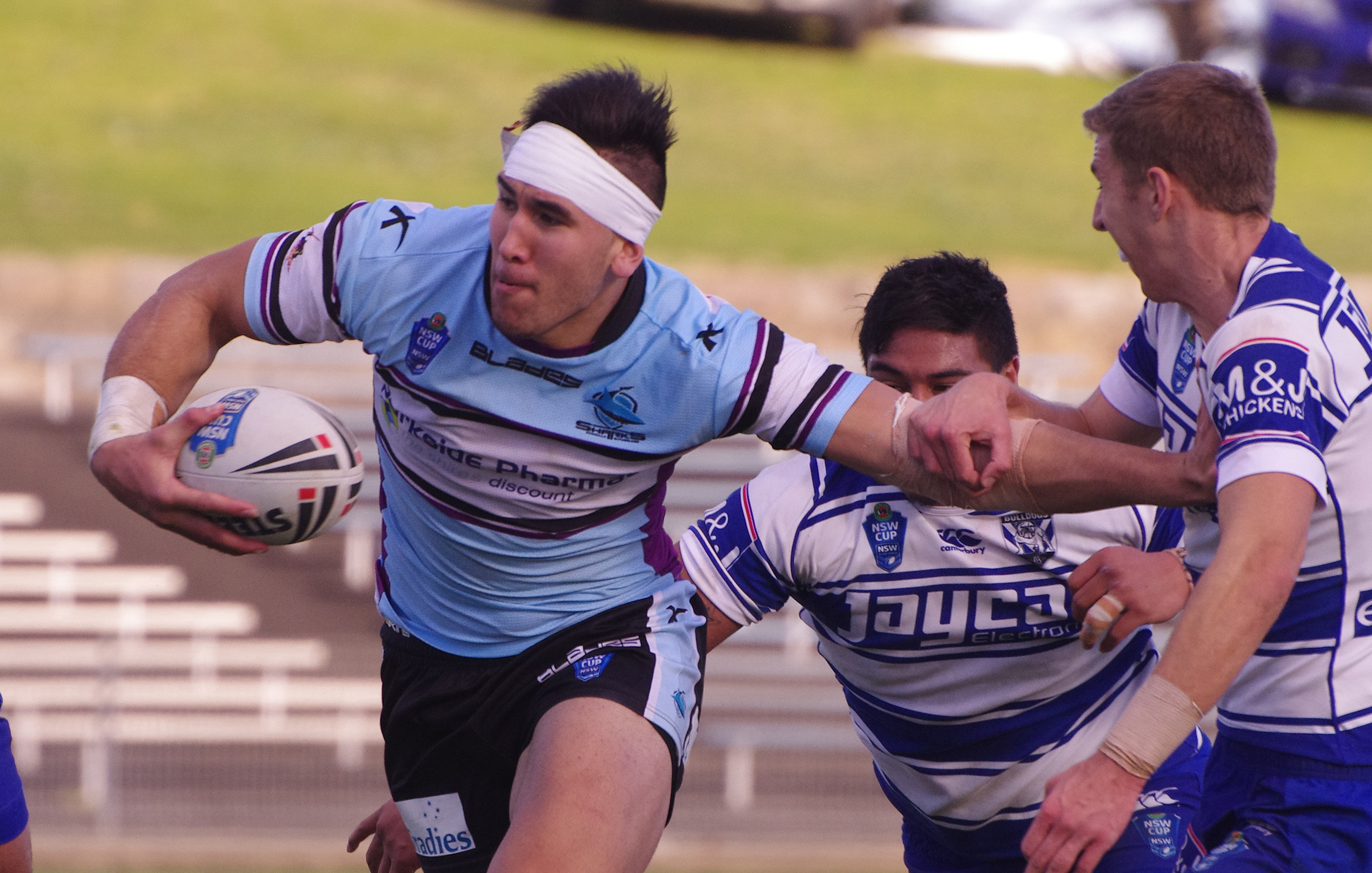
Asofa-Solomona playing for the Cronulla team in 2014

=== 2014 ===
In 2014, Asofa-Solomona played for the Melbourne Storm's NYC team. On 2 September, he was named at second-row in the 2014 NYC Team of the Year. On 18 October, he played for the Junior Kiwis against the Junior Kangaroos at second-row in the Kiwis' 15–14 win at Mount Smart Stadium.

=== 2015 ===
In 2015, Asofa-Solomona graduated to Melbourne's Queensland Cup team, Sunshine Coast Falcons. In Round 8 of the 2015 NRL season, he made his NRL debut for the Melbourne Storm against the Manly-Warringah Sea Eagles, playing off the interchange bench in the Storms' 12–10 loss at AAMI Park. On 2 May, he again played for the Junior Kiwis against the Junior Kangaroos, playing at prop in the Kiwis' 22–20 loss at Cbus Super Stadium. In Round 20 against the St George Illawarra Dragons, he scored his first NRL career try in Melbourne's 22–4 win at McLean Park. He finished off his debut year in the NRL having played in 12 matches and scoring one try.

=== 2016 ===
On 1 February, Asofa-Solomona was named in Melbourne's 2016 NRL Auckland Nines squad. Asofa-Solomona finished the 2016 NRL season with him playing in 15 matches for the Melbourne club.

=== 2017 ===
In February 2017, Asofa-Solomona was named in the Melbourne squad for the 2017 NRL Auckland Nines. In April 2017, Asofa-Solomona was called into the New Zealand Kiwis squad with a view to making his international debut against the Kangaroos but had to withdraw due to a hand injury. On 6 July 2017, Asofa-Solomona extended his contract with the Melbourne Storm to the end of the 2019 NRL season. On 1 October 2017, in Melbourne's 2017 NRL Grand Final against the North Queensland Cowboys, Asofa-Solomona played off the interchange bench in the 34–6 victory. Asofa-Solomona finished his successful 2017 NRL season with him playing in 26 matches and scoring four tries for Melbourne. On 5 October 2017, Asofa-Solomona was named in the New Zealand Kiwis 24-man squad for the 2017 Rugby League World Cup. On 28 October 2017, Asofa-Solomona made his international test debut for New Zealand against Samoa, where he played off the interchange bench and scored 1 try in the 38–8 win at Mt Smart Stadium.

=== 2018 ===
Asofa-Solomona was part of the victorious 2018 World Club Challenge and was awarded Man of the Match award. He was also part of the Melbourne Storm team that played in the 2018 NRL Grand Final. Asofa-Solomona was nominated for Dally M Prop of the year in 2018. Asofa-Solomona was part of the New Zealand national rugby league team tour of Denver, Colorado, in June 2018. It was the first time that Asofa-Solomona had played in a team with cousin, Ken Maumalo, professionally.

=== 2019 ===
Asofa-Solomona was awarded two Dally M points for his round one appearance in the victory over the Brisbane Broncos. He won a popular vote for tackle of the round for his hit on Matt Gillett. Round two saw Asofa-Solomona score his first try of the season. Asofa-Solomona played 27 games for Melbourne in the 2019 NRL season as the club finished as runaway minor premiers. Asofa-Solomona played in the club's preliminary final defeat against the Sydney Roosters at the Sydney Cricket Ground. In October, Asofa-Solomona was involved in an ugly brawl whilst on holiday in Bali. The NRL later fined Asofa-Solomona $15,000 and handed him a three-match test ban for New Zealand which saw him miss both matches against Great Britain and Australia. Asofa-Solomona says he reacted violently after it was alleged his Melbourne teammate Suliasi Vunivalu was coward-punched by an unidentified male.

=== 2020 ===
In the 2020 NRL Grand Final, Asofa-Solomona helped lead Melbourne to victory in their 20–26 win over the Minor Premiers Penrith. Asofa-Solomona played in 20 games in the 2020 NRL season, scoring four tries.

=== 2021 ===
Asofa-Solomona played a total of 17 games for Melbourne in the 2021 NRL season as the club won 19 matches in a row and claimed the Minor Premiership. Asofa-Solomona played in two finals matches including the preliminary final where Melbourne suffered a shock 10–6 loss against eventual premiers Penrith. He scored a try in the match but it was ruled out for obstruction.

=== 2022 & 2023 ===
Asofa-Solomona played 23 games for Melbourne in the 2022 NRL season as the club finished 5th on the table and were eliminated in the first week of the finals by Canberra. Following Melbourne's loss to Canterbury in round 2 of the 2023 NRL season, it was announced that Asofa-Solomona would miss six weeks with a high grade MCL injury. He played 20 games for Melbourne in the 2023 NRL season as the club finished third on the table. He played in all three finals matches as Melbourne were defeated in the preliminary final by Penrith.

=== 2024 ===
On 21 August 2024, Asofa-Solomona was inducted as a life member of the Melbourne Storm. On 24 August 2024, Asofa-Solomona scored a try against the Dolphins in a 48–6 win. He played a total of 19 matches for Melbourne in the 2024 NRL season as the club finished as minor premiers. He missed the clubs 2024 NRL Grand Final loss against Penrith due to suspension.

=== 2025 ===
Asofa-Solomona played 12 games for Melbourne in the 2025 NRL season. He missed the 2025 NRL Grand Final loss against Brisbane due to suspension. On 9 October, the Melbourne outfit announced that Asofa-Solomona had departed the club.

== 2026 - Turn to Boxing ==
Following his exit from the Storm he signed with Australian promotion company, No Limit. In January 2026, Asofa-Solomona made his professional boxing debut against Jeremy Latimore, winning in the first round via knockout.

On 7 November 2026, Asofa-Solomona defeated Paul Gallen via knockout in the first round, he later apologised for running into the crowd after a member of the audience called him a racial slur.

== Honours ==
Club

- 2016 Minor Premiership Winners
- 2017 Minor Premiership Winners
- 2017 NRL Grand Final Winners
- 2018 World Club Challenge Winners
- 2019 Minor Premiership winners
- 2020 NRL Grand Final Winners
- 2021 Minor Premiership winners

Individual

- 2014 Melbourne Storm Darren Bell U20s Player of The Year
- 2017 New Zealand Kiwis Rookie of the Year
- 2017 Spirit of ANZAC Medal
- 2018 World Club Challenge Man of the match
- 2024 Melbourne Storm Life Member (#166)

== Statistics ==
Year	Team	Games	Tries	Pts
2015	Melbourne Storm	12	1	4
2016	Melbourne Storm	15		
2017	Melbourne Storm	26	4	16
2018	Melbourne Storm	24	4	16
2019	Melbourne Storm	27	6	24
2020	Melbourne Storm	20	4	16
2021	Melbourne Storm	17	4	16
2022	Melbourne Storm	23	4	16
2023	Melbourne Storm	20	3	12
2024	Melbourne Storm	19	2	4
2025	Melbourne Storm	12	3	12
	Totals	215	35	140

== Boxing ==
In 2026, Nelson turned to boxing. In his first fight he beat fellow former Rugby League player Jeremy Latimore in Brisbane. His second fight was in the undercard of Tim Tszyu and Denis Nurja in Wollongong against another former Rugby League player Jarrod Wallace. He also won that fight.

=== Professional boxing record ===
3 fights	3 wins	0 losses
By knockout	3	0

No.	Result	Record	Opponent	Type	Round, time	Date	Location	Notes
3	Win	3-0	George Burgess	TKO	3 (1m26)	24 Jun 2026	Pat Rafter Arena, Brisbane, Australia	George Burgess debut
2	Win	2-0	Jarrod Wallace	TKO	3 (1m06)	4 Apr 2026	Wollongong Entertainment Centre, Wollongong, Australia	Jarrod Wallace debut
1	Win	1-0	Jeremy Latimore	KO	1 (2m27)	26 Jan 2026	Brisbane Entertainment Centre, Brisbane, Australia	Debut
