= Kenny Bromwich =

New Zealand & Maori international rugby league footballer

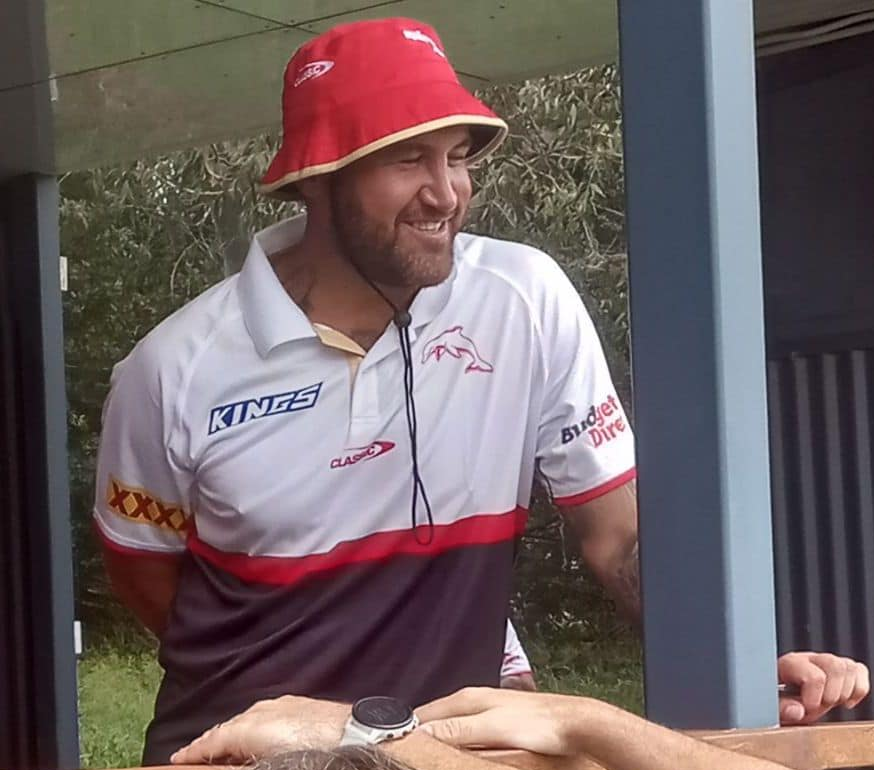

Personal information
- Full name: Kenneath Bromwich
- Born: 22 September 1991 (age 35) Auckland, New Zealand

Playing information
- Height: 183 cm (6 ft 0 in)
- Weight: 105 kg (16 st 7 lb)
- Position: Second-row, Lock
Club
Years	Team	Pld	T	G	FG	P
2013–22	Melbourne Storm	216	28	0	0	112
2023–25	Dolphins	44	4	0	0	16
	Total	260	32	0	0	128
Representative
Years	Team	Pld	T	G	FG	P
2015	Queensland Residents	1	0	0	0	0
2016–22	New Zealand	15	3	0	0	12
2019–24	Māori All Stars	4	0	0	0	0
- Relatives: Jesse Bromwich (brother)

Kenneath Bromwich (born 22 September 1991) is a former New Zealand professional rugby league footballer who last played as a second-row forward for the Dolphins in the National Rugby League (NRL), and represented New Zealand at international level.

He previously played for the Melbourne Storm and won the 2017 NRL Grand Final and 2020 NRL Grand Finals with them. Bromwich has also played for the New Zealand Māori team.

== Early life ==
Bromwich was born in Auckland, New Zealand. He moved to Melbourne, Australia, and was educated at Hallam Secondary College.

His older brother, Jesse Bromwich, also played for the Dolphins, Melbourne Storm, and New Zealand.

Originally a Manurewa Marlins junior in New Zealand, Kenny was signed to play for Melbourne Storm SG Ball team. When living in Melbourne, Bromwich played junior football for South Eastern Titans. Bromwich then played for the Melbourne Storm Toyota Cup (Under-20s) team in 2009, 2010 and 2011. He captained the team in 2011 and also was chosen in the 2011 Toyota Cup team of the year.

Bromwich has also made appearances for the Easts Tigers and Sunshine Coast Falcons in the Queensland Cup.

== Playing career ==
=== Melbourne Storm (2013-2022) ===
Round 5 of the 2013 NRL season Bromwich made his NRL debut for Melbourne against the Wests Tigers. He went on to play 9 games in his debut season.

Bromwich also played in the Queensland Cup grand final.

=== (2014) ===
Started the year well and went to play 18 games with Melbourne. Bromwich played in another Queensland Cup Grand final.

=== (2015) ===
Bromwich started the first 9 rounds in the Queensland Cup with the Sunshine Coast Falcons and went on to play in the Queensland Residents team against the New South Wales Residents at Langlands Park.

He finished the year in the Melbourne Storm first grade team with 18 games.

=== (2016) ===
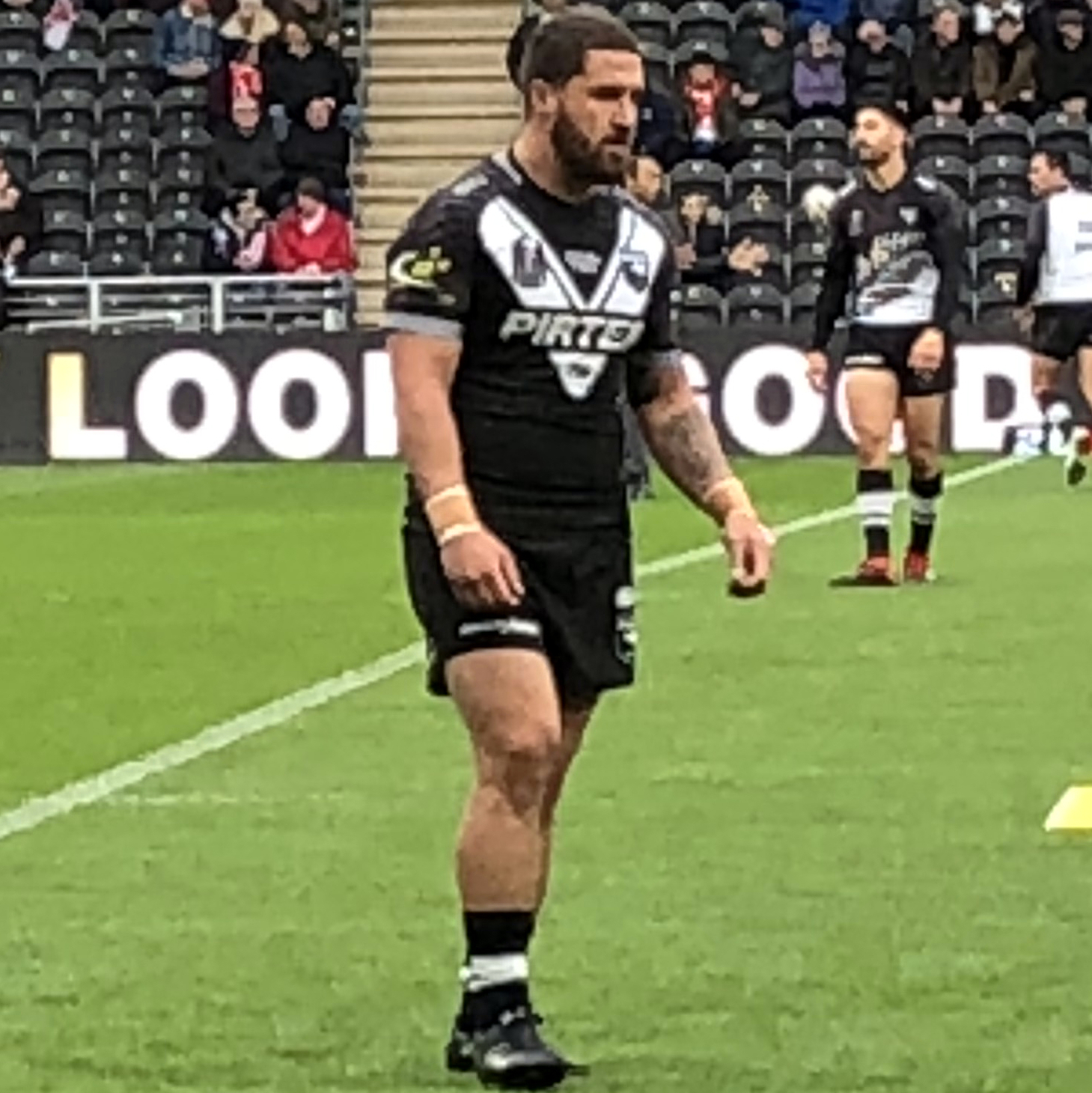
Bromwich warming up for New Zealand in 2018

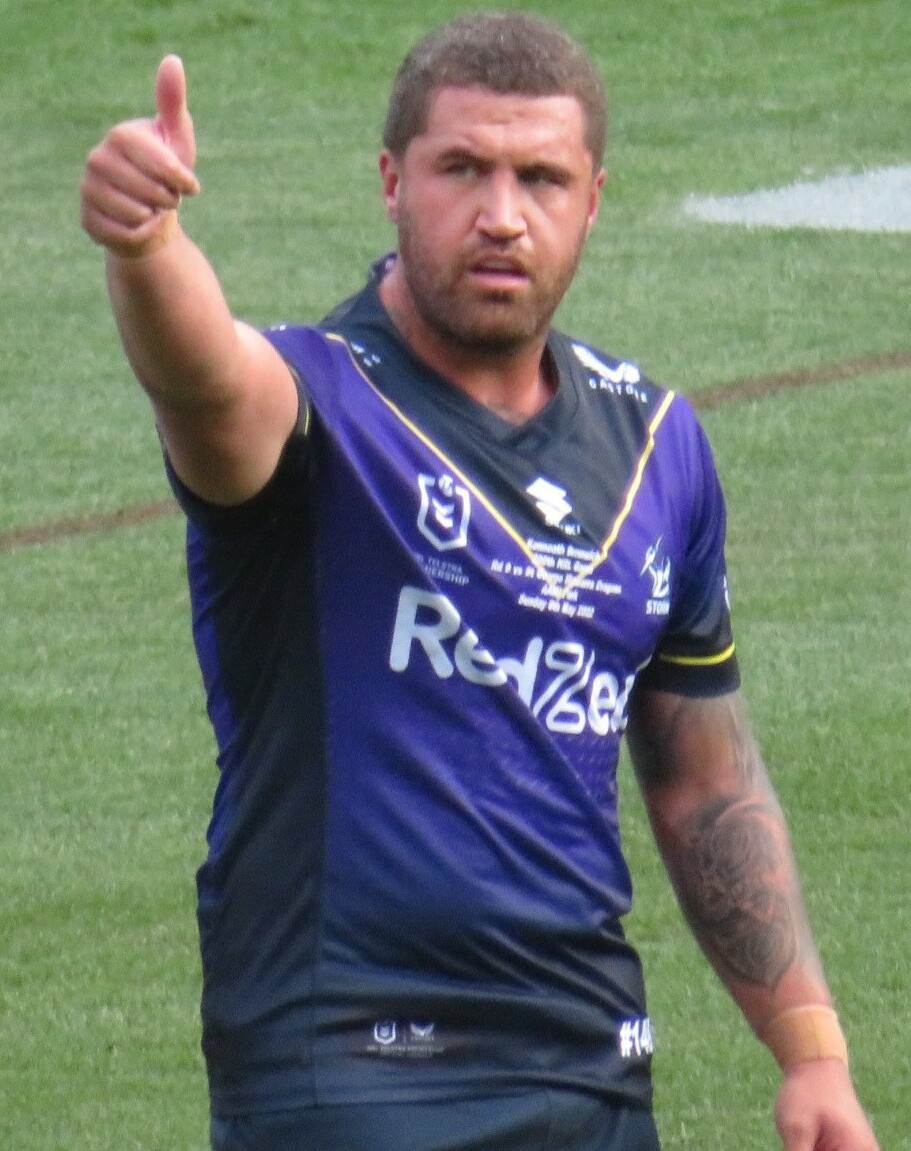
Bromwich playing for Melbourne in 2022

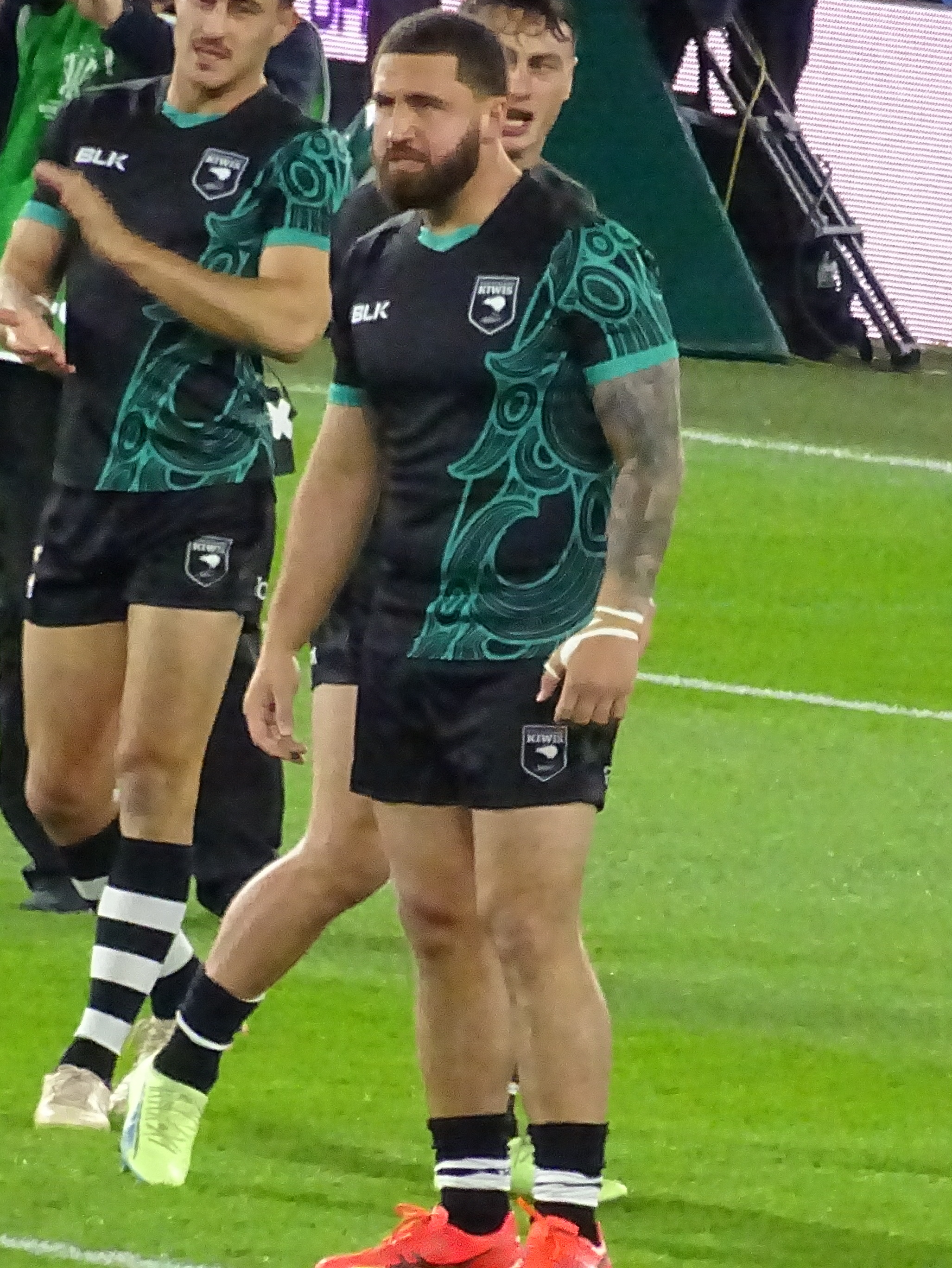
Bromwich warming up for the Kiwis in 2022

In May 2016, Bromwich made his international debut for New Zealand Kiwis in the 2016 Anzac Test.

He played in every single game for the Melbourne Storm this year, as well as the loss in the 2016 NRL Grand Final against the Cronulla-Sutherland Sharks.

=== (2017) ===
2017 was a good year for Bromwich, he played in 26 of the 27 games played this season only to miss the Anzac clash against the New Zealand Warriors due to the birth of his first child. He played in the 2017 NRL Grand Final victory.

He later went on to represent New Zealand in the 2017 Anzac Test and in the 2017 Rugby League World Cup.

=== (2018) ===
He was also part of the Melbourne Storm team that played in the 2018 World Club Challenge and 2018 NRL Grand Final loss against the Sydney Roosters.

=== (2019) ===
He played 27 games for Melbourne in the 2019 NRL season as the club finished as runaway Minor Premiers, however the club fell short of another grand final after capitulating against the Sydney Roosters in the preliminary final.

=== (2020) ===
He played 21 games for Melbourne in the 2020 NRL season including the club's 2020 NRL Grand Final victory over Penrith.

=== (2021) ===
Bromwich played a total of 21 games for Melbourne in the 2021 NRL season as the club won 19 matches in a row and claimed the Minor Premiership. He played in two finals matches including the preliminary final where Melbourne suffered a shock 10-6 loss against eventual premiers Penrith.

=== (2022) ===
On 3 February 2022, the Dolphins confirmed via Twitter that Bromwich had signed a three-year deal to join them, starting 2023.

In October he was named in the New Zealand squad for the 2021 Rugby League World Cup.

=== Dolphins (2023-25) ===
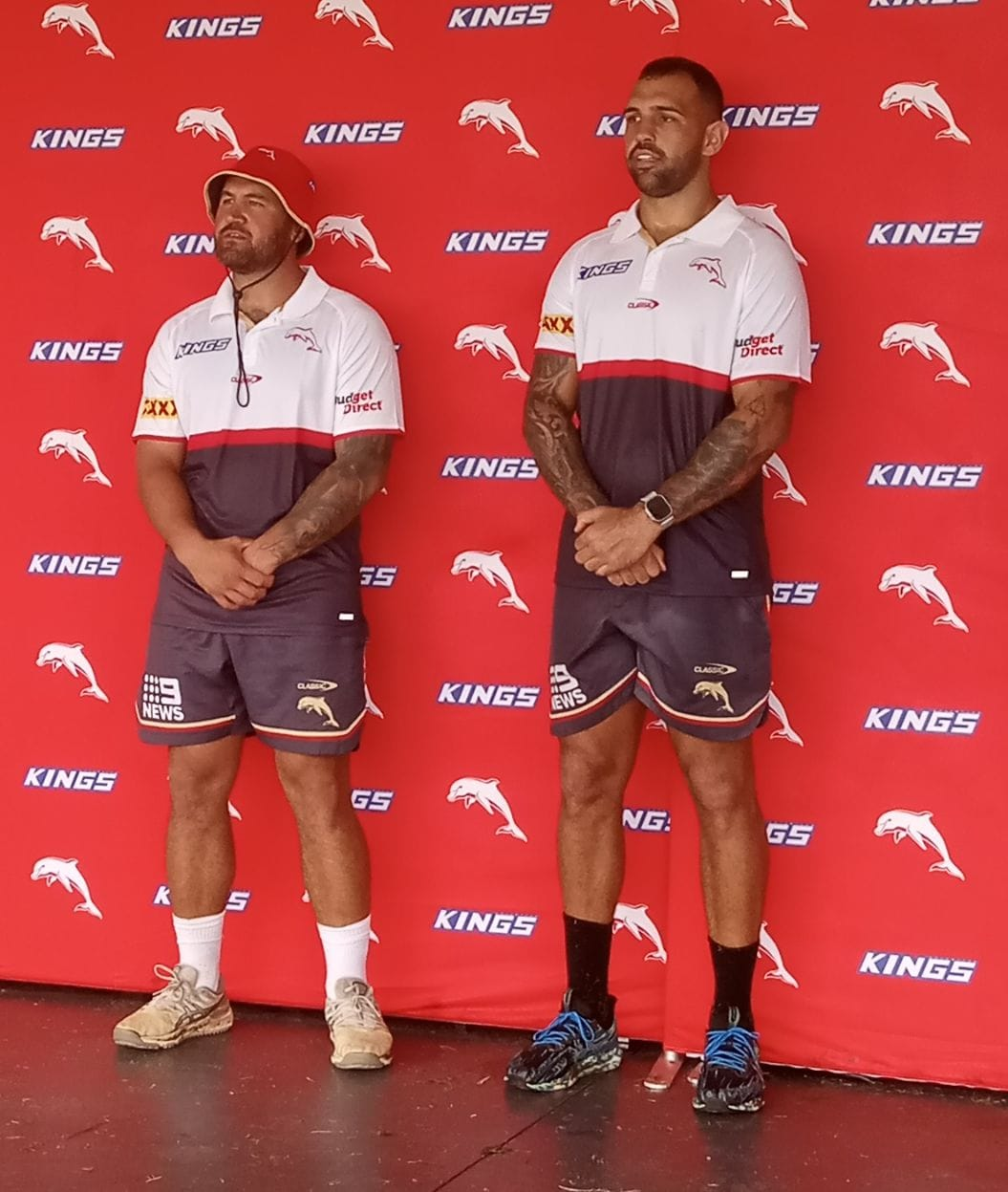
Bromwich and Josh Kerr in 2024

In round 1 of the 2023 NRL season, Bromwich made his club debut for the Dolphins in their inaugural game in the national competition, defeating the Sydney Roosters 28-18 at Suncorp Stadium. In round 7, South Sydney defeated the Dolphins 36-14 at Suncorp Stadium, and Bromwich was sin-binned in the 61st-minute and cited for a Grade 2 Dangerous Contact offence. He entered an early guilty plea and received a one-match ban. Notwithstanding, Bromwich played twenty-two games for the Dolphins in 2023. Bromwich played a total of 20 matches for the Dolphins in the 2024 NRL season as the club finished 10th on the table.

On 6 September 2025, Bromwich announced his retirement from the NRL.

== Statistics ==
Season	Team	Games	Tries	Pts
2013	Melbourne Storm	9	1	4
2014	Melbourne Storm	18	2	8
2015	Melbourne Storm	18	3	12
2016	Melbourne Storm	27	3	12
2017	Melbourne Storm	26	3	12
2018	Melbourne Storm	25	1	4
2019	Melbourne Storm	27	5	20
2020	Melbourne Storm	21	2	12
2021	Melbourne Storm	21	4	16
2022	Melbourne Storm	24	3	12
2023	Dolphins	22	2	4
2024	Dolphins	20	2	8
2025	Dolphins	2		
	Totals	260	32	128
