= Brodie Croft =

Australian rugby league footballer

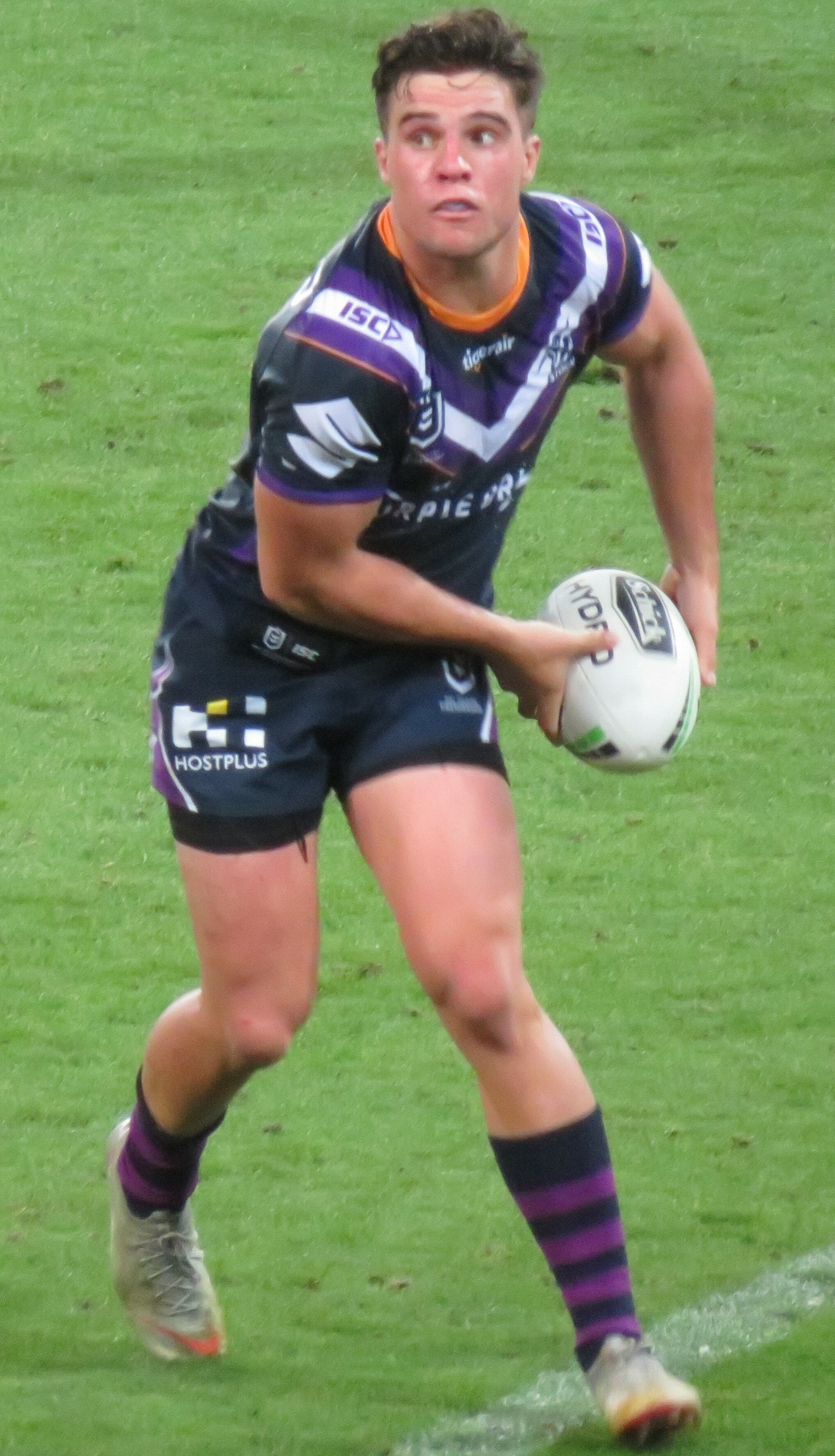

Personal information
- Born: 14 July 1997 (age 29) Dalby, Queensland, Australia
- Height: 5 ft 10 in (1.77 m)
- Weight: 13 st 10 lb (87 kg)

Playing information
- Position: Stand-off, Scrum-half
Club
Years	Team	Pld	T	G	FG	P
2016–19	Melbourne Storm	39	12	9	2	68
2020–21	Brisbane Broncos	26	2	0	0	8
2022–23	Salford Red Devils	55	12	0	0	48
2024–26	Leeds Rhinos	79	43	0	3	175
2027–	Warrington Wolves	0	0	0	0	0
	Total	199	69	9	5	299
Representative
Years	Team	Pld	T	G	FG	P
2022	Combined Nations All Stars	1	0	0	0	0
- Source: As of 15 November 2026

Brodie Croft (born 14 July 1997) is an Australian professional rugby league footballer who plays as a stand-off for the Warrington Wolves in the Super League.

He previously played for Leeds Rhinos and the Salford Red Devils in the Super League, winning the Man of Steel Award and the Albert Goldthorpe Medal with the latter, and Melbourne Storm with whom he won the 2018 World Club Challenge and the Brisbane Broncos as a scrum-half in the NRL.

== Early life ==
Croft was born in Dalby, Queensland, Australia. He was educated at St. Joseph's College, Toowoomba, before moving to Anglican Church Grammar School for Years 11 & 12.

He played his junior rugby league for the Highfields Eagles and was a member of the 2014 Churchie First XV alongside Kalyn Ponga, and Jaydn Su'a before being signed by the Melbourne Storm.

He played for the Toowoomba Clydesdales in the Cyril Connell Cup during 2013, before moving to Brisbane, to join the Eastern Suburbs Tigers in the Mal Meninga Cup. The following year, he was named 18th man for the Queensland under-18 rugby league team.

== Playing career ==
=== 2016–2019: Melbourne Storm ===
In 2016, Croft was named in the QAS under-20 squad and played for the Melbourne Storm's NYC team. On 22 May, he made his Queensland Cup debut with Melbourne's feeder team, the Easts Tigers, scoring a try in their 52-20 win over the Ipswich Jets.

In Round 15 of the 2016 season, he made his NRL debut for the Melbourne Storm against St. George Illawarra. On 13 July, he represented the Queensland under-20 rugby league team.

Croft started the 2017 season by playing in the NRL Auckland Nines. He scored 3 tries and was named in the team of the tournament. In just his second NRL game, he slotted an extra-time field goal to secure victory over North Queensland and in doing so, Melbourne escaped with a 23-22 win in golden-point. On 24 July, he signed a contract extension with the Storm, tying him to the club for at least another three years with a view to replacing Cooper Cronk in the long-term as Melbourne's halfback. Croft was described by the media at the time as the next Cooper Cronk and was labelled a "Cooper Cronk clone". On 19 August, with Cronk rested, Croft scored a hat-trick and had two try assists in a 44-12 win over the Newcastle Knights in just his fifth NRL game. Despite this performance, he didn't feature in another NRL match for the remainder of the season due to the return of Cronk, leading the NRL side to the 2017 NRL Grand Final victory.

In February 2018, Croft staked his claim as Melbourne's new halfback. He scored a try and three try assists in a composed performance against Leeds in the 2018 World Club Challenge at AAMI Park. He played in the 2018 NRL Grand Final against the Sydney Roosters where Melbourne were beaten 21-6.

After playing the first 21 games of the 2019 season at halfback, Croft was surprisingly dropped from the Melbourne line-up entirely, only playing one more game in round 25 at five-eighth, and not making an appearance throughout the finals. In order to remain under the salary cap for 2020, Melbourne elected to release Croft from his contract, officially doing so on 29 November. That same day, he signed a three-year contract with the Brisbane Broncos.

=== 2020–2021: Brisbane Broncos ===
Croft endured a difficult first year in Brisbane and played 14 games for the club as they finished last on the table and claimed the wooden spoon.

In round 20 of the 2021 NRL season, Croft scored his first try of the season in a 37-18 thrashing of arch rivals North Queensland. On 9 August, Croft signed a two-year deal to join British side Salford.

=== 2022–2023: Salford Red Devils ===
On 9 August 2021, Salford Red Devils announced the signing of Brodie Croft from the Brisbane Broncos on a two-year deal. Upon signing for the club, Director of Rugby and Operations Ian Blease said "Brodie coming to the Red Devils is up there with any signing in recent times for this club. It has taken a long period of time to get this deal done but I am so pleased to get a player of Brodie's quality and class officially across the line. Brodie can come to the Red Devils and enjoy his rugby league again, he is still only a young halfback and after speaking with him over the last few weeks he has the determination to come to the club and push us on with our ambition, it will be tremendous to see him don the Red Devils shirt next season and beyond."

In Round 1 of the 2022 Super League season, Croft made his club debut for Salford in their 26-16 victory over Castleford. Croft played almost every game for Salford in the 2022 Super League season and following a remarkable comeback win away to Warrington in July 2022, Croft's form prompted Salford head coach Paul Rowley to label Croft as the 'best half-back in Super League'. Croft guided Salford to play-off finish and was instrumental in securing the teams preliminary finals spot after a comprehensive victory away at Huddersfield. Due to a failed head injury assessment in the Huddersfield game, Croft missed the clubs semi-final defeat to St Helens RFC due to concussion protocols. Croft finished the regular season with 32 try contributions (25 assists and 7 tries). Croft made over 2,700 running metres with 83 tackle busts and 23 clean breaks. On 20 September 2022, Croft was named Man of Steel after being voted as the seasons best player. In February 2023, Croft signed a seven-year deal to remain at Salford until the end of the 2030 Super League season. In the 2023 Super League season, Croft played 25 matches for Salford as the club finished 7th on the table and missed the playoffs.

=== 2023–present: Leeds ===
On 18 October 2023, Croft signed a three-year deal to join Leeds ahead of the 2024 Super League season. In round 1 of the 2024 Super League season, Croft made his club debut for Leeds against his former team Salford. Leeds would win the match 22-16. Croft played 25 matches for Leeds in the 2024 Super League which saw the club finish 8th on the table. Croft played 25 games for Leeds in the 2025 Super League season which saw the club finish 4th on the table. Croft played in their elimination playoff match loss against St Helens.

He will join Warrington Wolves on a 3 year deal from the 2027 season.

== Honours ==
Individual

- 2016, 2017 Queensland under-20 rugby league team
- 2022 Steve Prescott Man of Steel

Club

- 2018 World Club Challenge Winners

== Statistics ==
Year	Team	Games	Tries	Goals	FGs	Pts
2016	Melbourne Storm	1				
2017	Melbourne Storm	4	4		1	17
2018	Melbourne Storm	12	3	5		22
2019	Melbourne Storm	22	5	4	1	29
2020	Brisbane Broncos	14	1			4
2021	Brisbane Broncos	12	1			4
2022	Salford	28	7			
2023	Salford	27	5			20
2024	Leeds Rhinos	26	8		2	34
2025	Leeds Rhinos	23	7			28
2026	Leeds Rhinos	24	28			80
2027	Warrington Wolves					
	Totals	185	65	9	4	260
