= Suliasi Vunivalu =

Australia & Fiji international rugby union & league footballer

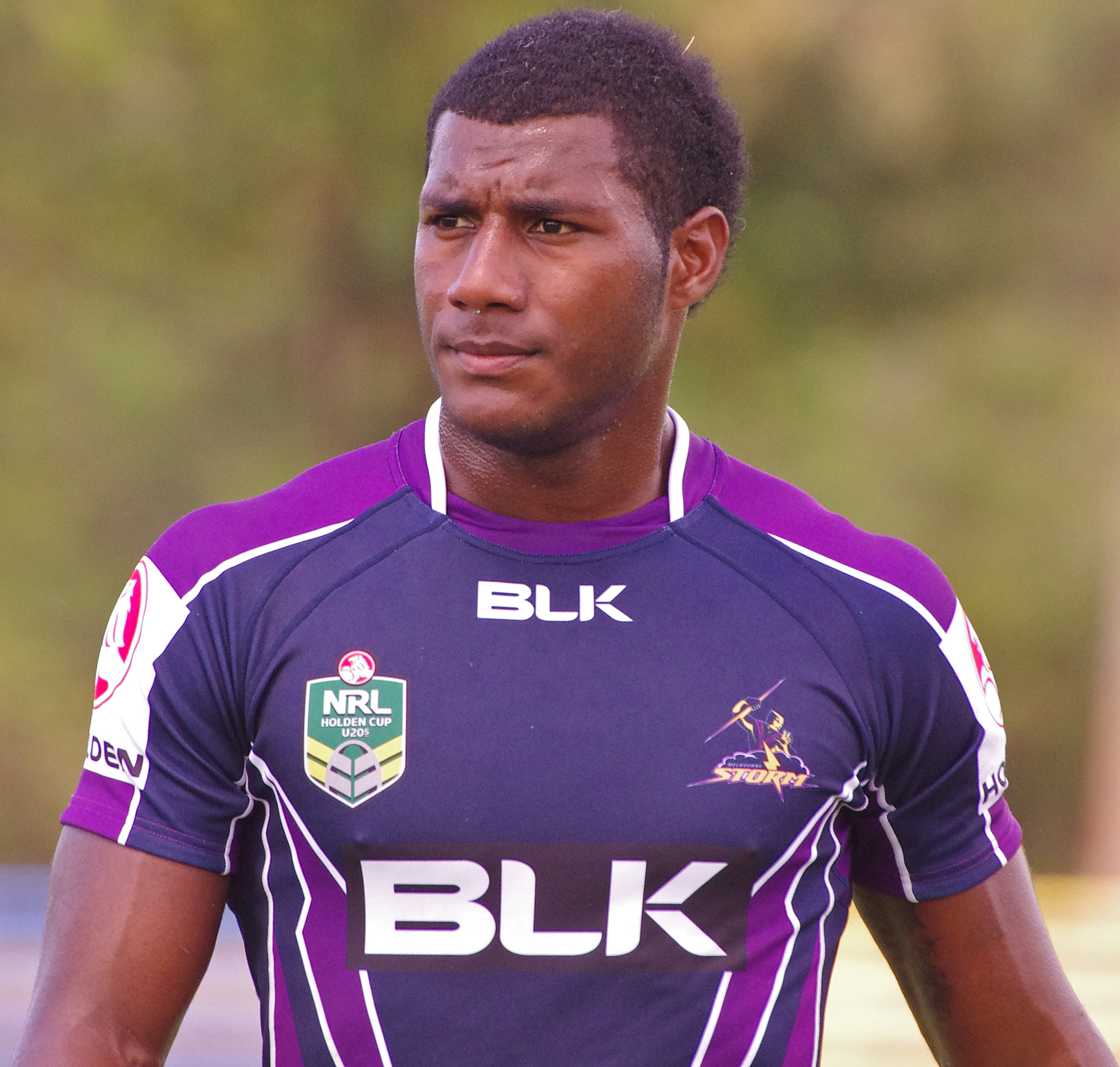

Personal information
- Full name: Suliasi Bainiua Vunivalu
- Born: 27 November 1995 (age 30) Suva, Fiji
- Height: 1.92 m (6 ft 4 in)
- Weight: 100 kg (15 st 10 lb)

Playing information
- Position: Wing
Club
Years	Team	Pld	T	G	FG	P
2016–20	Melbourne Storm	111	86	0	0	344
Representative
Years	Team	Pld	T	G	FG	P
2017–19	Fiji	10	12	1	0	50
- School: Lelean Memorial School; Saint Kentigern College

Rugby union career
- Position: Wing
- Current team: Reds
Senior career
Years	Team	Apps	(Points)
2021–2024	Reds	39	(80)
2025–present	La Rochelle	7	(10)
- Correct as of 22 June 2026
International career
Years	Team	Apps	(Points)
2022	Australia A	2	(5)
2022	Australia	7	(10)
- Correct as of 22 June 2026

Suliasi Bainiua Vunivalu (born 27 November 1995) is a professional rugby union footballer who plays for French club La Rochelle. He previously played for the Queensland Reds in Super Rugby and the Australian national team. His regular playing position is wing.

Vunivalu began his career playing professional rugby league for the Melbourne Storm in the NRL, and Fiji at international level. He is a dual NRL premiership winning player of 2020 and 2017.

== Early life ==
Vunivalu was born in Suva, Fiji, and grew up in the province of Bua and was educated at Nehru Memorial Primary School and later continued his studies at Lelean Memorial School. Vunivalu then moved to Auckland, New Zealand, at the age of 16 and played rugby union for Saint Kentigern College. When Vunivalu turned 17, he made the Blues development team after impressing in schoolboy rugby. He was then signed by the Melbourne Storm at 18 years old.

== Rugby league career ==
=== Melbourne Storm ===
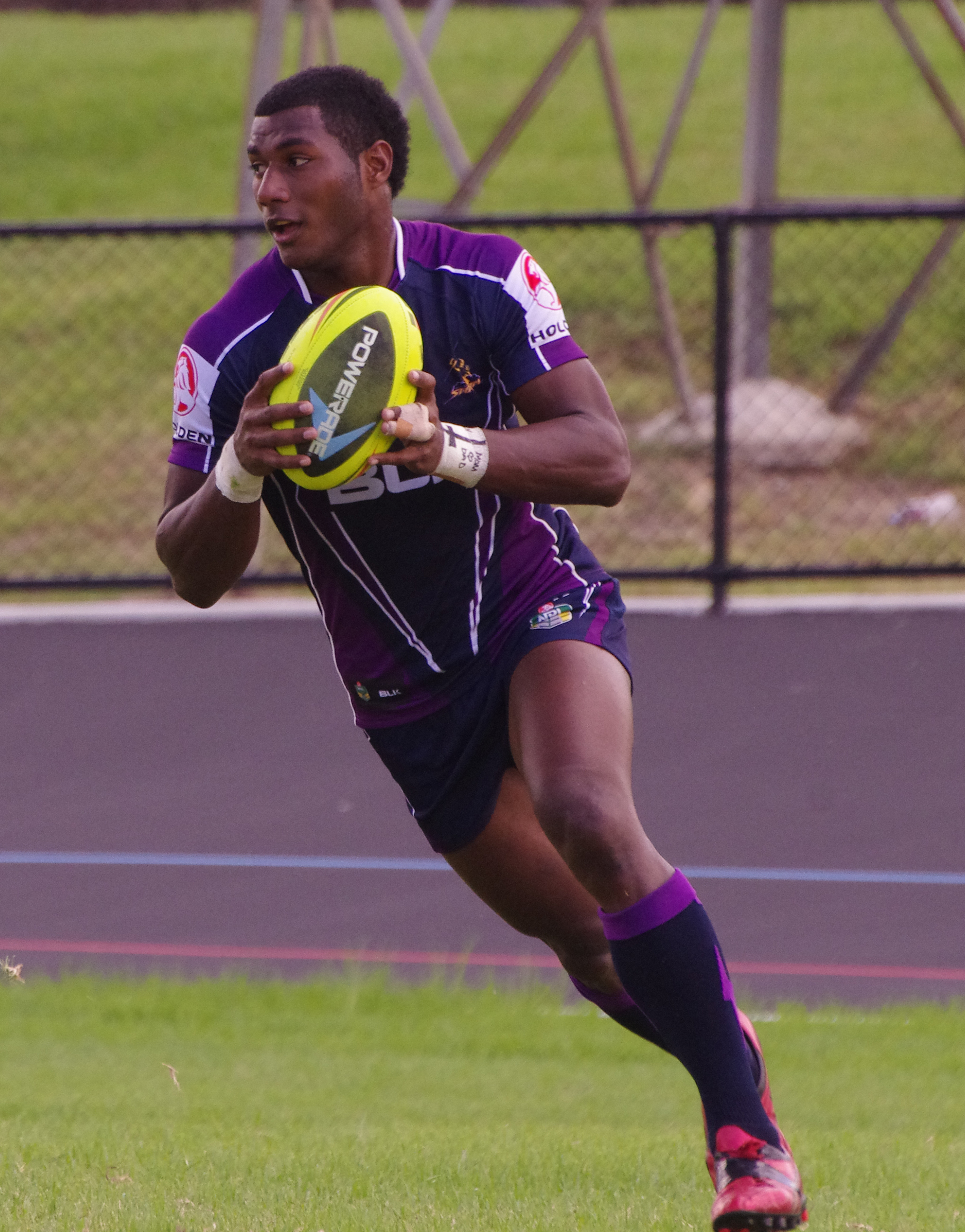
Vunivalu playing for the Storm

In 2014 and 2015, Vunivalu played for the Melbourne Storm's NYC team.

==== 2016–17 ====
Vunivalu graduated to the Storm's Queensland Cup team, Eastern Suburbs Tigers. In Round 7, he made his NRL debut for the Storm against the Wests Tigers, scoring two tries on debut. He went on to score doubles in his second, third, fifth and eighth games also, gaining top position on the club's try-scorers list for the 2016 season.

On 3 September, Vunivalu set the record for most tries in a debut season record by scoring his 22nd try of the season against the Cronulla-Sutherland Sharks, eclipsing the previous record of 21 tries set by Israel Folau back in 2007. He was also the top-try scorer of the season. On 2 October, he played in the 2016 NRL Grand Final loss against Cronulla-Sutherland.

On 31 August, Vunivalu extended his contract with the Melbourne club until the end of the 2020 season. He was part of the Melbourne's premiership winning team against the North Queensland Cowboys in the 2017 NRL Grand Final.

==== 2018–19 ====
On 16 February 2018, Vunivalu played in the 2018 World Club Challenge victory over Leeds, scoring a try. Vunivalu represented Fiji Bati in the 2018 Pacific Rugby League Tests. He played in the 2018 NRL Grand Final loss against the Sydney Roosters.

Vunivalu played 24 games for Melbourne in 2019, scoring 11 tries, including a hat-trick in Melbourne's 22-10 round 2 victory over the Canberra Raiders at GIO Stadium. He also played for the Fiji Bati in the mid season and post season tests. Melbourne finished as Minor Premiers in the 2019 NRL season and were favourites to win the premiership but were defeated in the preliminary final against the Sydney Roosters.

==== 2020 ====
In his final season with the Melbourne, Vunivalu played 17 games, including Melbourne's 26–20 win over Penrith in the 2020 NRL Grand Final, where he scored a try, his 14th of the season.

== Rugby union career ==
=== Queensland Reds ===
In December 2019, it was confirmed by the Queensland Reds that Vunivalu signed with the rugby union team, returning to the sport for the first time since he was eighteen-years old. Vunivalu signed a two-year deal to begin in 2021.

==== 2021–22 ====
In 2021, Vunivalu made his debut for the Reds in the 40–19 loss to the Highlanders, coming off the bench at the beginning of the second half and scoring 2 tries in the loss. His next game was against the Crusaders, again scoring a try in the 28–63 loss. Vunivalu finished the 2021 Super Rugby Trans-Tasman season with 4 matches and 4 tries. In 2022, Vunivalu played in 10 matches and scored 3 tries for the Queensland Reds.

== International career ==
=== Rugby league ===
Early in the 2017 NRL season, Suliasi was selected for his Fiji Bati international debut at the Pacific Rugby League Test against Tonga, played at the Campbelltown Stadium in Sydney on 6 May.

Vunivalu was selected in the Fiji 24-man squad for the 2017 Rugby League World Cup. On 28 October in the 2017 Rugby League World Cup, he scored 2 tries in the 58–12 victory over the Hawks at 1300SMILES Stadium.

On 5 November, Vunivalu scored his hat trick tries in the record scored of 72–6 victory over Wales at 1300SMILES Stadium. On 10 November, he scored his second hat trick of tries in the 60th minute mark after beating Italy in the 38–10 win at Canberra Stadium. After the Bati reached the semi-final, he was nominated for the Rugby League World Golden Boot Award, which was won by Storm teammate Cameron Smith.

=== Rugby union ===
Based on World Rugby's laws, at international level, Vunivalu is eligible to represent the country of his birth: Fiji, and the country of his 36 consecutive month residency: Australia.

Vunivalu was brought in to the Wallabies training camp on 11 November 2020, less than a week after their two-point win over the All Blacks. Coach Dave Rennie stated, after speculation of Vunivalu's place in the Wallabies squad for the Tri Nations Series, that "there’s no plan to use Suli in the two Argentina games unless we have got a spate of injuries," adding, "the key for him is to earn the right to play and [we are] keen to reward the guys who have been working for the last three months."

Vunivalu made his Australia debut in the third test against England during the 2022 England rugby union tour of Australia. Coming off the bench in the final five minutes of the match in a 17 – 21 loss. That same year, as part of the 2022 end-of-year rugby union internationals, Vunivalu debuted for the second national team, Australia A, against Japan. Vunivalu scored a try in the 34 – 22 victory.

== Honours ==
Individual

- 2016: NRL - Most tries in a debut season (23)
- 2016: Melbourne Storm - Most tries in a season (23)
- 2016: Dally M Top Try Scorer (23)
- 2017: NRL - Most tries in first two seasons (46)
- 2017: Dally M Top Try Scorer (23)

Club

- 2016 Minor Premiership Winners
- 2017 Minor Premiership Winners
- 2017 NRL Grand Final Winners
- 2018 World Club Challenge Winners
- 2019 Minor Premiership Winners
- 2020 NRL Grand Final Winners
