= 2016 Melbourne Storm season =

- NRL Rank: 1st (Minor Premier)
- Play-off result: Runner-up
- 2016 record: Wins: 19; draws: 0; losses: 5
- Points scored: For: 563; against: 302

Team information
- CEO: Dave Donaghy
- Coach: Craig Bellamy
- Captain: Cameron Smith (26 games) Jesse Bromwich (1 game)
- Stadium: AAMI Park – 30,050; Suncorp Stadium - 52,500 (1 game)

Top scorers
- Tries: Suliasi Vunivalu (23)
- Goals: Cameron Smith (87)
- Points: Cameron Smith (184)
← 2015	List of seasons	2017 →

The 2016 Melbourne Storm season was the 19th in the club's history competing in the 2016 NRL season. The team was coached by Craig Bellamy in his 14th consecutive season, during which he coached his 350th match. Cameron Smith continued as team captain, his ninth season in the role since he was appointed as sole captain in 2008. In the pre-season the Storm competed in the 2016 Auckland Nines tournament, reaching the semi-finals.

Storm kicked off the season with three straight wins despite playing below their best. Marika Koroibete scored two tries in a season-opening win against the Dragons while Will Chambers did the same the following week in a 34–16 triumph over the Gold Coast. Two losses soon followed against the Sharks and Bulldogs before a round 7 golden point win over the Wests Tigers saw Melbourne hit their straps. Cooper Cronk's 85th minute field goal in that game kick-started a stellar run for Storm that saw them win 13 of their next 14 games to move into top spot on the NRL ladder. Cronk would make his 300th NRL appearance in the preliminary final later in the season — becoming just the 25th player to reach that mark.

The team managed to win the minor premiership, securing the J.J. Giltinan Shield for the second time since 2010 whilst also experiencing one of the longest injury lists the club had seen. With their outside back stocks all but depleted, Cheyse Blair, rookie Suliasi Vunivalu and mid-season signing Ryan Morgan were all handed Storm debuts.

For the first time in the club's history, Storm kept their opponents scoreless in consecutive weeks, first on ANZAC Day against the Warriors (42–0) then the Titans a week later (38–0). Round 10 saw the Melbourne take part in their first ever NRL Double Header in front of 52,347 fans at Suncorp Stadium — the largest non-finals crowd of the season. That night Cameron Smith helped Storm to a thrilling one-point win over the Cowboys with a field goal in the 71st minute. Melbourne then went through the Origin period with a 5–1 record, its best performance during that part of a season in six years. Big away wins over the Roosters and Broncos by 46 and 42 points respectively were the highlights. Vunivalu scored three tries that night against Brisbane to make it 16 tries from his opening 10 games. The 20-year-old ultimately finished with 23 for the season to finish the year as the NRL's leading try scorer and break Storm's try-scoring record. The final game of the season saw the men in purple clinch the club's first minor premiership since 2011 with a 26–6 win over Cronulla. They backed up their efforts in the first week of the finals, defeating reigning premiers North Queensland 16–10. After earning a week off, Craig Bellamy's side booked their place in a sixth Grand Final in 11 years, narrowly defeating the Canberra Raiders 14–12. That game also broke a new record for Storm as it was the first time in history the club recorded four consecutive home crowds of 20,000-plus.

Storm then gave their absolute all against the Sharks in the 2016 NRL Grand Final and took the lead with 15 minutes to play. However, they were ultimately pipped for the top prize, going down 14–12.

== Season summary ==
- Pre-season – New recruits took part in Melbourne Storm IDQ camp for pre season training before New Years. Dale Finucane was awarded the IDQ Iron bar.
- Auckland Nines – The club commenced their 2016 season competing in the annual Auckland Nines competition on 6–7 February 2016. For the first time they made it past the pool stage, winning their first two games. They also won their quarter final before losing the semi-final to eventual winner Parramatta Eels. Blake Green captained a youthful squad with an average age of just 22, with assistant coach Adam O'Brien handling coaching responsibilities.
- 4 March - Craig Bellamy announces that he has signed a 2-year contract extension with the club meaning his coaching tenure will continue until the end of the 2018 season.
- Round 1 - The Storm won their 12th consecutive first round encounter, with Marika Koroibete scoring two tries playing in his 50th NRL game. Billy Slater re-injures his shoulder, ruling him out for the rest of the season.
- Round 2 - Storm have a commanding victory over the Titans with Curtis Scott making his NRL debut.
- Round 3 - Storm remain the only unbeaten side in the NRL after a win over Warriors in New Zealand.
- Round 5 - Storm score their 300th win in the NRL coming from behind to defeat the Newcastle Knights.
- Round 6 - Fijian Suliasi Vunivalu became the 171st player to debut for the Storm and in his debut game scored two tries including one in the first minute of the match.
- Round 9 - The Storm demolish the Gold Coast Titans 38-0 in a very one-sided game, this was the second consecutive week that the Storm have kept a side scoreless. This game marked Craig Bellamy's 350th NRL game as coach, and also Cheyse Blair's debut for the Storm. In addition the game was notable for the fact that in only his third game, Suliasi Vunivalu scored two tries for the third consecutive week.
- Round 10 - The Storm defeat reigning premier's North Queensland Cowboys 15-14 in their "home" game at Brisbane's Suncorp Stadium. Cameron Smith kicked only the second field goal of his career to break the deadlock.
- 19 May - Winger Marika Koroibete announces that he will leave the Storm at the end of the season and switch to Super Rugby side Melbourne Rebels.
- Round 11 - Ryan Morgan makes his debut for the Storm against his old club the Parramatta Eels after being granted an immediate release from the Eels following their salary cap scandal.
- Round 14 - The Storm demolish the Sydney Roosters away in a record breaking win. Records that fell in this game were:
  - It was the Storm's biggest win against the Roosters,
  - The first time the Roosters were kept tryless against the Storm
  - Roosters worst defeat against any side at Allianz Stadium.
  - First time three tries has been scored by a Storm player this season
  - Most points scored by a Storm player in a game this season
- Round 15 - Brodie Croft makes his playing debut and Suliasi Vunivalu becomes the NRL leading try scorer - to date, scoring 2 tries in the Storm's loss to St George Illawarra.
- Round 17 - Melbourne Storm complete a record breaking win over the Brisbane Broncos defeating them 48-6 in what was their 10th win in 11 matches at Suncorp Stadium. Records that fell were:
  - Largest ever win over Broncos.
  - Brisbane's biggest ever defeat at Suncorp Stadium against any side.
  - Melbourne's highest score thus far this season.
  - Cameron Smith scoring 8 goals from 8 attempts scored the most points in a game thus far this season.
- Round 19 - Matt White made his playing debut, in the Melbourne Storm's narrow win over Newcastle.
- Round 20 - Jesse Bromwich played his 150th game against the Storms win over the Sydney Roosters.
- Round 21 - Marika Koroibete plays his 50th game.
- 5 August - Cooper Cronk signs a new two-year contract extension that will almost certainly see him finish his career with the Storm.
- Round 22 - The Storm defeat the South Sydney Rabbitohs 15-14 with a field Goal in Golden point extra time, moving to first place on the NRL table. The win came after scoring a penalty goal in the 80th minute to level the scores.
- Round 24 - Suliasi Vunivalu scores 4 tries in the Storms big win over Manly and in doing so registered the following records:
  - equaled the club record for most tries scored in a game
  - equaled the club record for most tries scored in a season
  - equaled the NRL record for most tries scored in a rookie season
- Round 26 - The Storm defeat the Cronulla Sharks in front of a sold-out crowd of 24,135 spectators to claim the minor Premiership. Suliasi Vunivalu also scored his 22nd try for the season claiming the outright record for most tries scored in a season for a Melbourne Storm player. Tohu Harris also played his 100th game.
- Finals Week 1 - The Storm defeat the North Queensland Cowboys to earn a weeks break and a home Preliminary Final in Week 3.
- Finals Week 3 - Cooper Cronk played his 300th game in the home Preliminary final win against Canberra. The win earned the Storm a place in the 2016 NRL Grand Final. The crowd of 28,161 was also the Storms highest home crowd of the season and also their fifth highest ever home attendance.
- Finals Week 4 - The 2016 NRL Grand Final was and closely fought game and after the Cronulla Sharks won the first half and led 8-0 at half time, the Storm came back to hit the front in the second half 12 - 8 before the sharks scored the match winning try and winning the game 14 - 12. The final went right down to the final minutes with the Storm falling only metres short of scoring a try in the final few seconds. The Grand Final also marked Melbourne Storm's 500th NRL game.

=== Milestone games ===
Round	Player	Milestone
Round 1	Marika Koroibete	50th NRL game
Round 2	Curtis Scott	NRL debut
Round 6	Suliasi Vunivalu	NRL debut
Round 11	Ryan Morgan	Storm debut
Round 15	Brodie Croft	NRL debut
Round 19	Matthew White	Storm debut
Round 20	Jesse Bromwich	150th game
Round 21	Marika Koroibete	50th Storm game
Finals Week 3	Cooper Cronk	300th game

== Fixtures ==
=== Pre-season ===
Date	Round	Opponent	Venue	Result	Mel.	Opp.	Source
6 February	Auckland Nines Pool Games	Parramatta Eels	Eden Park, Auckland, New Zealand	Win	14	4	
6 February	Auckland Nines Pool Games	South Sydney Rabbitohs	Eden Park, Auckland, New Zealand	Win	18	12	
7 February	Auckland Nines Pool Games	Sydney Roosters	Eden Park, Auckland, New Zealand	Loss	7	26	
7 February	Auckland Nines Quarter-final	North Queensland Cowboys	Eden Park, Auckland, New Zealand	Win	14	6	
7 February	Auckland Nines Semi-final	Parramatta Eels	Eden Park, Auckland, New Zealand	Loss	8	17	
13 February	Trial	Wests Tigers	Sunshine Coast Stadium, Sunshine Coast	Loss	16	18	
20 February	Trial	Canterbury Bulldogs	Belmore Sports Ground, Belmore	Loss	0	20	

=== Regular season ===
==== Result by round ====
Round	1	2	3	4	5	6	7	8	9	10	11	12	13	14	15	16	17	18	19	20	21	22	23	24	25	26
Ground	H	H	A	A	H	H	A	H	A	N	A	–	H	A	A	H	A	–	A	H	A	H	A	A	H	H
Result	W	W	W	L	W	L	W	W	W	W	W	B	W	W	L	W	W	B	W	W	W	W	L	W	L	W
Position	8	5	1	3	2	6	5	3	3	3	2	2	2	1	2	2	2	2	2	2	2	1	1	1	1	1
Points	2	4	6	6	8	8	10	12	14	16	18	20	22	24	24	26	28	30	32	34	36	38	38	40	40	42

Source: Rugby League Tables
A = Away; H = Home; N = Neutral; B = Bye; W = Win; D = Draw; L = Loss

==== Matches ====
- (g.p.) – Golden Point extra time
- (pen) – Penalty try

Date	Rd	Opponent	Venue	Result	Mel.	Opp.	Tries	Goals	Field goals	Ref
7 March	1	St George-Illawarra Dragons	AAMI Park, Melbourne	Won	18	16	M Koroibete (2), K Bromwich	C Smith 3/5		
13 March	2	Gold Coast Titans	AAMI Park, Melbourne	Won	34	16	W Chambers (2), D Finucane, B Green, C Munster, Y Tonumaipea	C Smith 5/6		
20 March	3	New Zealand Warriors	Mt Smart Stadium, Auckland	Won	21	14	K Bromwich, C Munster, M Koroibete	C Smith 4/4	C Cronk 1/1	
28 March	4	Cronulla-Sutherland Sharks	Southern Cross Group Stadium, Sydney	Lost	6	14	F Kaufusi	C Smith 1/1		
2 April	5	Newcastle Knights	AAMI Park, Melbourne	Won	18	14	C Cronk (2), R Kennar	C Smith 3/4		
11 April	6	Canterbury-Bankstown Bulldogs	AAMI Park, Melbourne	Lost	12	18	T Harris, Y Tonumaipea	C Smith 2/3		
17 April	7	Wests Tigers	Leichhardt Oval, Sydney	Won (g.p.)	19	18	S Vunivalu (2), C Cronk, M Koroibete	C Smith 1/5	C Cronk 1/2, C Smith 0/1	
25 April	8	New Zealand Warriors	AAMI Park, Melbourne	Won	42	0	S Vunivalu (2), T Harris, T Glasby, J Bromwich, M Koroibete, C Munster, C Cronk	CSmith 5/8		
1 May	9	Gold Coast Titans	Cbus Super Stadium, Gold Coast	Won	38	0	S Vunivalu (2), C Cronk (2), M Blair, T Harris, B Green	C Smith 5/8		
14 May	10	North Queensland Cowboys	Suncorp Stadium, Brisbane	Won	15	14	T Harris, K Proctor	C Smith 3/3	C Smith 1/1	
23 May	11	Parramatta Eels	Pirtek Stadium, Sydney	Won	18	6	S Vunivalu (2), M Koroibete, M Blair	C Smith 1/4		
28 May	12	Bye								
4 June	13	Penrith Panthers	AAMI Park, Melbourne	Won	24	6	J Bromwich, K Proctor, R Morgan, C Cronk	C Smith 4/5		
11 June	14	Sydney Roosters	Allianz Stadium, Sydney	Won	46	0	S Vunivalu (3), C Cronk (2), K Proctor, M Blair, C Munster	C Smith 7/8		
18 June	15	St George-Illawarra Dragons	WIN Stadium, Wollongong	Lost	10	20	S Vunivalu (2)	T Harris 1/3		
26 June	16	Wests Tigers	AAMI Park, Melbourne	Won	29	20	F Kaufusi (2), T Harris, M Koroibete	C Smith 6/6	C Cronk 1/2	
1 July	17	Brisbane Broncos	Suncorp Stadium, Brisbane	Won	48	6	S Vunivalu (3), M Blair (2), K Proctor, R Morgan, M Koroibete	C Smith 8/8		
9 July	18	Bye								
17 July	19	Newcastle Knights	Hunter Stadium, Newcastle	Won	20	16	M Koroibete (2), S Vunivalu, T Harris	C Smith 2/4		
23 July	20	Sydney Roosters	AAMI Park, Melbourne	Won	26	10	D Finucane, K Proctor, C Cronk, T Harris	C Smith 5/5		
30 July	21	North Queensland Cowboys	1300SMILES Stadium, Townsville	Won	16	8	K Proctor, M Koroibete, T Glasby	C Smith 2/3		
6 August	22	South Sydney Rabbitohs	AAMI Park, Melbourne	Won (g.p.)	15	14	M Koroibete, M Blair	C Smith 3/4	C Smith 1/1, C Cronk 0/1	
15 August	23	Canberra Raiders	GIO Stadium, Canberra	Lost	8	22	C Cronk	C Smith 2/2		
20 August	24	Manly Warringah Sea Eagles	Brookvale Oval, Sydney	Won	38	18	S Vunivalu (4), K Bromwich, C Smith, F Kaufusi	C Smith 4/6, T Harris 1/1		
26 August	25	Brisbane Broncos	AAMI Park, Melbourne	Lost	16	26	T Harris, B Hampton, C Smith	C Smith 2/3		
3 September	26	Cronulla-Sutherland Sharks	AAMI Park, Melbourne	Won	26	6	M Blair (2), S Vunivalu, J Bromwich	C Smith 5/6		

=== Finals ===
2nd Qualifying final

Saturday, 10 September
19:55 AEST (UTC+10)

Melbourne Storm	16 – 10	North Queensland Cowboys
Tries: 2 Vunivalu 32'; J Bromwich 52'; Goals: 4 Smith pen 30', pen 49', 54', pen 77' (4/5)	1st: 6–6; 2nd: 10–4	Tries: 2 Winterstein 40'; Feldt 62'; Goals: 1 Thurston 40' (1/2)

AAMI Park, Melbourne
Attendance: 21,233
Referees: Ben Cummins, Grant Atkins
Player of the Match: Jesse Bromwich (Melbourne)

2nd Preliminary final

Saturday, 24 September
19:45 AEST (UTC+10)

Melbourne Storm	14 – 12	Canberra Raiders
Tries: 2 Cronk 32'; Blair 60'; Goals: 3 Smith pen 16', 33', pen 64' (3/4)	1st: 8–6; 2nd: 6–6	Tries: 2 Rapana 23'; Whitehead 76'; Goals: 2 Sezer 25', 77' (2/2)

AAMI Park, Melbourne
Attendance: 28,161
Referees: Matt Cecchin, Alan Shortall
Player of the Match: Cooper Cronk (Melbourne)

2016 NRL Grand Final

Sunday, 2 October
19:15 AEDT (UTC+11)

Melbourne Storm	12 – 14	Cronulla-Sutherland Sharks
Tries: 2 J Bromwich 50'; Chambers 64'; Goals: 2 Smith 51', 66' (2/2)	1st: 0–8; 2nd: 12–6; Report	Tries: 2 Barba 15'; Fifita 69'; Goals: 3 Maloney pen 8', 16', 71' (3/3)

ANZ Stadium, Sydney
Attendance: 83,625
Referees: Matt Cecchin, Ben Cummins
Touch judges: Jeff Younis, Brett Suttor
Clive Churchill Medal: Luke Lewis (Cronulla-Sutherland)

=== Ladder ===
2016 NRL season
Pos	Team	Pld	W	D	L	B	PF	PA	PD	Pts
1	Melbourne Storm	24	19	0	5	2	563	302	+261	42
2	Canberra Raiders	24	17	1	6	2	688	456	+232	39
3	Cronulla-Sutherland Sharks (P)	24	17	1	6	2	580	404	+176	39
4	North Queensland Cowboys	24	15	0	9	2	584	355	+229	34
5	Brisbane Broncos	24	15	0	9	2	554	434	+120	34
6	Penrith Panthers	24	14	0	10	2	563	463	+100	32
7	Canterbury-Bankstown Bulldogs	24	14	0	10	2	506	448	+58	32
8	Gold Coast Titans	24	11	1	12	2	508	497	+11	27
9	Wests Tigers	24	11	0	13	2	499	607	−108	26
10	New Zealand Warriors	24	10	0	14	2	513	601	−88	24
11	St. George Illawarra Dragons	24	10	0	14	2	341	538	−197	24
12	South Sydney Rabbitohs	24	9	0	15	2	473	549	−76	22
13	Manly-Warringah Sea Eagles	24	8	0	16	2	454	563	−109	20
14	Parramatta Eels	24	13	0	11	2	298	324	−26	18^{1}
15	Sydney Roosters	24	6	0	18	2	443	576	−133	16
16	Newcastle Knights	24	1	1	22	2	305	800	−495	7

^{1} Parramatta were deducted 12 competition points and their for/against tally accumulated between rounds 1-9 for gross long-term salary cap breaches.

== 2016 coaching staff ==
- Head coach: Craig Bellamy
- Assistant coaches: Adam O’Brien & Jason Ryles
- Development coaches: Marc Brentnall & Aaron Bellamy
- Specialist coaches: Nick Maxwell (leadership) & Craig McRae (skills)
- Director of performance: Dean Benton
- Performance coaches: Adam Basil (conditioning), Daniel Di Pasqua (strength) & Tim Rogers (rehabilitation)
- Training & logistics manager: Matthew Barradeen
- Football director: Frank Ponissi
- Head physiotherapist: Meirion Jones
- Physiotherapist: Andrew Nawrocki
- Club doctor: Jason Chan

Academy & affiliate

- Storm Academy: Matt Adamson
- Under 20s coach: Eric Smith
- Sunshine Coast Falcons coach: Craig Ingebrigsten
- Easts Tigers coach: Scott Sipple

== 2016 squad ==
As of 20 July 2016

Cap (Note: Players are listed with the cap number as they appear on the Melbourne Storm honour board. Additional squad members do not have a cap number.)	Nat.	Player name	Position	First Storm Game	Previous First Grade RL club (Note: This column denotes the previous RL club the player was signed to and played first grade RL for. If they are yet to debut then this is stipulated. If they were merely signed to the club but did not play then it is not counted.)
55	(Australia)	Cameron Smith (c)	HK	2002	(Australia) Melbourne Storm
58	(Australia)	Billy Slater	FB	2003	(Australia) Melbourne Storm
73	(Australia)	Cooper Cronk	HB	2004	(Australia) Melbourne Storm
97	(Australia)	Will Chambers	CE	2007	(Australia) Queensland Reds
105	(New Zealand)	Kevin Proctor	SR	2008	(Australia) Melbourne Storm
119	(New Zealand)	Jesse Bromwich	PR	2010	(Australia) Melbourne Storm
144	(New Zealand)	Tohu Harris	SR,LK,FE	2013	(Australia) Melbourne Storm
147	(New Zealand)	Slade Griffen	HK,LK	2013	(Australia) Melbourne Storm
149	(New Zealand)	Kenny Bromwich	PR,SR,LK	2013	(Australia) Melbourne Storm
150	(Australia)	Jordan McLean	PR	2013	(Australia) Melbourne Storm
152	(Australia)	Ben Hampton	FE,HB,FB	2013	(Australia) Melbourne Storm
153	(Australia)	Tim Glasby	PR,SR	2013	(Australia) Melbourne Storm
154	(Samoa)	Young Tonumaipea	WG,FB	2014	(Australia) Melbourne Storm
160	(Australia)	Cameron Munster	FE,FB,HB	2014	(Australia) Melbourne Storm
161	(Fiji)	Marika Koroibete	WG	2014	(Australia) Wests Tigers
162	(Australia)	Blake Green	FE,HB	2015	(England) Wigan Warriors
163	(Australia)	Dale Finucane	PR,SR,LK	2015	(Australia) Canterbury Bulldogs
164	(New Zealand)	Felise Kaufusi	PR	2015	(Australia) North Queensland Cowboys
166	(New Zealand)	Nelson Asofa-Solomona	SR, PR	2015	(Australia) Melbourne Storm
167	(Australia)	Christian Welch	SR, PR	2015	(Australia) Melbourne Storm
168	(Samoa)	Richard Kennar	WG	2015	(Australia) Melbourne Storm
170	(Australia)	Curtis Scott	CE,WG	2016	(Australia) Cronulla Sharks
171	(Fiji)	Suliasi Vunivalu	WG	2016	(Australia) Melbourne Storm
172	(Australia)	Cheyse Blair	WG,CE	2016	(Australia) Manly Sea Eagles
173	(Australia)	Ryan Morgan	CE	2016	(Australia) Parramatta Eels
174	(Australia)	Brodie Croft	HB	2016	(Australia) Melbourne Storm
175	(Australia)	Matthew White	PR	2016	(Australia) Gold Coast Titans
—	(Australia)	Mark Nicholls	PR,SR	Yet to Debut	(Australia) Canberra Raiders
—	(Australia)	Scott Drinkwater	FB	Yet to Debut	(Australia) Sydney Roosters
—	(Tonga)	Nafe Seluini	HK	Yet to Debut	(Australia) Sydney Roosters
—	(Fiji)	Ben Nakubuwai	PR	Yet to Debut	(Australia) Melbourne Storm
—	(Australia)	Dean Britt	PR, SR	Yet to Debut	(Australia) Melbourne Storm

== Player movements ==
Losses

- Matt Duffie to Blues (rugby union)
- Kurt Mann to St George Illawarra Dragons
- Ryan Hinchcliffe to Huddersfield Giants
- Mahe Fonua to Hull F.C.
- Hymel Hunt to South Sydney Rabbitohs
- Tom Learoyd-Lahrs to Retirement
- Charnze Nicoll-Klokstad to New Zealand Warriors
- Shaun Nona to Released
- Dayne Weston to Leigh Centurions

Gains

- Matthew White from Gold Coast Titans
- Mark Nicholls from Canberra Raiders
- Scott Drinkwater from Sydney Roosters
- Nafe Seluini from Sydney Roosters
- Curtis Scott from Cronulla Sharks
- Cheyse Blair from Manly Sea Eagles
- Ryan Morgan from Parramatta Eels

== Representative honours ==
The following players have played a representative match in 2016. (C) = Captain

	2016 All Stars match	City Vs Country	Rugby League internationals 2016 Anzac Test Pacific Tests	State of Origin 1	State of Origin 2	State of Origin 3	Four Nations (b)
Cameron Smith	World All Stars (C)	-	Australia (C)	Queensland (C)	Queensland (C)	Queensland (C)	Australia (C)
Will Chambers	Indigenous All Stars	-	-	-	-	-	-
Jordan McLean	-	Country	-	-	-	-	-
Dale Finucane	-	Country	-	-	-	-	-
Cooper Cronk	-	-	Australia	Queensland	Queensland	Queensland	Australia
Jesse Bromwich	-	-	New Zealand (C)	-	-	-	New Zealand (C)
Tohu Harris	-	-	New Zealand	-	-	-	New Zealand
Kevin Proctor	-	-	New Zealand	-	-	-	New Zealand
Ben Nakubuwai	-	-	Fiji	-	-	-	-
Tui Kamikamica	-	-	Fiji	-	-	-	-
Nafe Seluini	-	-	Tonga	-	-	-	-
Felise Kaufusi	-	-	Tonga	-	-	Queensland (a)	-

(a) - Felise Kaufusi was selected as the 18th Man for Queensland in State of Origin Game 3 but did not play.
(b) - includes the AUS vs NZL pre-tournament game to be played in Perth prior to travelling to England.

== Statistics ==
Statistics source: Complete as of the end of the 2016 Regular season, (these stats do not include finals).

Name	App	T	G	FG	Pts
Nelson Asofa-Solomona	14	0	0	0	0
Cheyse Blair	14	8	0	0	32
Jesse Bromwich	24	3	0	0	12
Kenny Bromwich	24	3	0	0	12
Will Chambers	14	2	0	0	8
Brodie Croft	1	0	0	0	0
Cooper Cronk	23	11	0	3	47
Dale Finucane	24	2	0	0	8
Tim Glasby	19	2	0	0	8
Blake Green	21	2	0	0	8
Ben Hampton	17	1	0	0	4
Tohu Harris	24	8	2	0	36
Jeremy Hawkins	0	0	0	0	0
Felise Kaufusi	21	4	0	0	16
Richard Kennar	3	1	0	0	4
Marika Koroibete	22	12	0	0	48
Jordan McLean	18	0	0	0	0
Ryan Morgan	8	2	0	0	8
Cameron Munster	21	4	0	0	16
Mark Nicholls	0	0	0	0	0
Kevin Proctor	21	6	0	0	24
Curtis Scott	2	0	0	0	0
Nafe Seluini	0	0	0	0	0
Billy Slater	1	0	0	0	0
Cameron Smith	23	2	83	2	176
Young Tonumaipea	12	2	0	0	8
Suliasi Vunivalu	18	22	0	0	88
Christian Welch	15	0	0	0	0
Matt White	3	0	0	0	0
26 players used	-	97	85	5	563

Scorers

Most points in a game: 16 points

- Round 17 - Cameron Smith (8 Goals) vs Brisbane Broncos
- Round 24 - Suliasi Vunivalu (4 Tries) vs Manly Sea Eagles

Most tries in a game: 4

- Round 24 - Suliasi Vunivalu vs Manly Sea Eagles

Winning games

Highest score in a winning game: 48 points

- Round 17 vs Brisbane Broncos

Lowest score in a winning game: 14 points

- Preliminary Final vs Canberra Raiders

Greatest winning margin: 46 points

- Round 14 vs Sydney Roosters

Greatest number of games won consecutively: 7

- Round 7 to Round 14

Losing games

Highest score in a losing game: 16 points

- Round 25 - vs Brisbane Broncos

Lowest score in a losing game: 6 points

- Round 4 - vs Cronulla Sharks

Greatest losing margin: 14 points

- Round 23 - vs Canberra Raiders

== Jersey ==
In November 2015 the Melbourne Storm signed a new five-year deal with Melbourne-based manufacturer STAR. New home and away jerseys were designed for the upcoming season. The home jersey is predominantly navy blue at the top, which morphs into purple father down. The lightning bolts also make a return on the sides of the jersey. The away jersey is a striking white top with a navy blue and purple V across the chest.

Jersey choice
RD1	RD2	RD3	RD4	RD5	RD6	RD7	RD8	RD9	RD10	RD11	RD12	RD13	RD14	RD15	RD16	RD17	RD18	RD19	RD20	RD21	RD22	RD23	RD24	RD25	RD26	QF	SF	PF	GF
Home	Home	Clash^	Home	Home	Home	Clash	Home^^	Clash	Indigenous^{#}	Clash	—	Home	Clash	Home	Home	Clash	—	Clash	Heritage^{%}	Clash	WIL^{&}	Home	Clash	Home	Home	Home	—	Home	Home

^ Alternate sponsor logo used due to New Zealand restrictions on gambling advertising.
^^ Added ANZAC Appeal and RSL Centenary logos.
^{#} Designed by Lenny Briggs and Dixon Patten.
^{%} Replica of 2000 World Club Challenge jersey, also worn in Round 5 2000 at the MCG.
^{&} Women in League jersey — mostly pink and purple design.

== Awards ==
=== Trophy Cabinet ===
- J. J. Giltinan Shield
- Michael Moore Trophy (Round 3 & 8)

=== Melbourne Storm Awards Night ===
Held at Docklands, Melbourne on Friday 7 October 2016.

- Melbourne Storm Player of the Year: Jesse Bromwich
- Melbourne Storm Rookie of the Year: Suliasi Vunivalu
- Suzuki Members' Player of the Year: Cameron Smith
- Melbourne Storm Most Improved: Cameron Munster
- Melbourne Storm Best Forward: Cameron Smith
- Melbourne Storm Best Back: Cooper Cronk
- Feeder Club Player of the Year Award: Joe Stimson
- Darren Bell U20s Player of the Year Award: Louis Geraghty
- U20s Best Forward: Lachlan Timm
- U20s Best Back: Jesse Arthars
- Greg Brentnall Young Achievers Award: Ben Nakubuwai
- Mick Moore Club Person of the Year: Adam O’Brien
- Life Member inductees: Brian Phelan (welfare manager)

=== Dally M Awards Night ===
Melbourne Storm players walked away from rugby league's Dally M awards on 28 September 2016 with a total of six Dally M awards.

- Dally M Medal: Cooper Cronk
- Dally M Representative Player of the Year: Cameron Smith
- Dally M Halfback of the Year: Cooper Cronk
- Dally M Prop of the Year: Jesse Bromwich
- Dally M Hooker of the Year: Cameron Smith
- Dally M Top Try Scorer: Suliasi Vunivalu

=== RLPA Awards Night ===
- RLPA New Zealand Representative Player of the Year: Jesse Bromwich

=== Rugby League World Golden Boot ===
On 22 December 2016, Cooper Cronk won the 2016 Rugby League World Golden Boot Award (world's best player).

=== Additional awards ===
- I Don't Quit Iron Bar: Dale Finucane
- Wally Lewis Medal: Cameron Smith
- Rugby League Four Nations Player of the Series: Cooper Cronk
- Spirit of ANZAC Medal: Tohu Harris
- Auckland Nines Team of the Year: Tohu Harris
- QRL Peter Jackson Memorial Award: Billy Slater
- New Zealand Kiwi Player of the Year: Jesse Bromwich
