= 2017 NRL Grand Final =

Championship game of the National Rugby League season

Melbourne Storm	North Queensland Cowboys
34	6
	1	2	Total
MEL	18	16	34
NQL	0	6	6
- Date: 1 October 2017
- Stadium: ANZ Stadium
- Location: Sydney, New South Wales, Australia
- Clive Churchill Medal: Billy Slater
- Australian National anthem: Ricki-Lee Coulter
- Referee: Matt Cecchin; Gerard Sutton; Nick Beashel (Touch Judge); Chris Butler (Touch Judge)
- Attendance: 79,722

Broadcast partners
- Broadcasters: Nine Network (Live); Fox League (Delayed)
- Commentators: Ray Warren Peter Sterling Wally Lewis Phil Gould Darren Lockyer (sideline) Brad Fittler (sideline)

The 2017 NRL Grand Final was the conclusive and premiership-deciding game of the 2017 National Rugby League season and was played on Sunday October 1 at Sydney's ANZ Stadium. The match was contested between minor premiers the Melbourne Storm and the eighth-placed North Queensland Cowboys. The Storm won the match 34 – 6 to claim their third premiership title. Melbourne fullback Billy Slater was awarded his second Clive Churchill Medal as the game's official man of the match.

The match was preceded by the 2017 NRL Under-20s Grand Final and the 2017 NRL State Championship. Pre-match entertainment was headlined by American rapper Macklemore, who attracted controversy for his scheduled performance of "Same Love" during the ongoing nationwide postal survey on same-sex marriage. The match was broadcast live throughout Australia by the Nine Network.

Fairfax Media described the 2017 NRL Grand final as "one of the most one-sided grand finals in the NRL era".

== Background ==
	Storm	Cowboys
Rd.1	Bulldogs	Raiders
Rd.2	Warriors	Broncos
Rd.3	Broncos	Sea-Eagles
Rd.4	Tigers	Titans
Rd.5	Panthers	Rabbitohs
Rd.6	Sharks	Tigers
Rd.7	Sea-Eagles	Dragons
Rd.8	Warriors	Knights
Rd.9	Dragons	Eels
Rd.10	Titans	Bulldogs
Rd.11	Rabbitohs	Sharks
Rd.12	Bye	Bye
Rd.13	Knights	Titans
Rd.14	Sharks	Eels
Rd.15	Cowboys	Storm
Rd.16	Roosters	Panthers
Rd.17	Broncos	Raiders
Rd.18	Eels	Bye
Rd.19	Bye	Rabbitohs
Rd.20	Raiders	Warriors
Rd.21	Sea-Eagles	Roosters
Rd.22	Cowboys	Storm
Rd.23	Roosters	Panthers
Rd.24	Knights	Sharks
Rd.25	Rabbitohs	Tigers
Rd.26	Raiders	Broncos
QF/EF	Eels	Sharks
SF	DNP	Eels
PF	Broncos	Roosters
GF	Cowboys	Storm
Legend: Win Loss

This was the third time that a grand final was contested by two non-Sydney/New South Wales based teams, after the 2006 Grand Final (Brisbane defeating Melbourne) and the 2015 Grand Final (North Queensland defeating Brisbane), and the first to feature neither the Brisbane Broncos or a Sydney-based club. The Melbourne Storm qualified for their seventh grand final since 2006, with only coach Craig Bellamy and halfback Cooper Cronk having been involved on each occasion. It was also the first time since 2009 that a side had reached a premiership decider in consecutive seasons, with the Storm having made four straight appearances between 2006 and 2009. The North Queensland Cowboys made their first grand final appearance since their maiden premiership victory over the Brisbane Broncos in 2015, as well as their third in the club's history. It was the first time since the Canterbury-Bankstown Bulldogs in 2014 that a side reached a grand final from outside the top-four, the first time since the Parramatta Eels in 2009 to reach the grand final from as low as 8th position, and the first club to qualify from 8th under the current final eight system that was implemented in 2012.

Claiming their third minor premiership, the Melbourne Storm finished the regular season on 44 competition points, six points clear of the second placed Sydney Roosters in losing only 4 games from 24 matches. Their points differential of +297 was their highest amount since 2008. With a two-game home ground advantage, they defeated the fourth-placed Parramatta Eels 18–16 to earn a week off and a place in the grand final qualifier, where they would beat the Brisbane Broncos 30–0 to reach a consecutive grand final. North Queensland only made the finals series after the Canterbury-Bankstown Bulldogs defeated the St. George Illawarra Dragons in the final round of the regular season. This result denied St. George Illawarra 8th spot and allowed the North Queensland side into the finals instead. North Queensland made a winning run defeating their next three opponents in the finals, all of whom were Sydney-based clubs. They defeated defending premiers, the Cronulla-Sutherland Sharks 15–14 in extra time at Allianz Stadium, Parramatta 24–16 at ANZ Stadium, and the Roosters 29–16 at Allianz Stadium, making it the first time they have reached a grand final without losing a finals match.

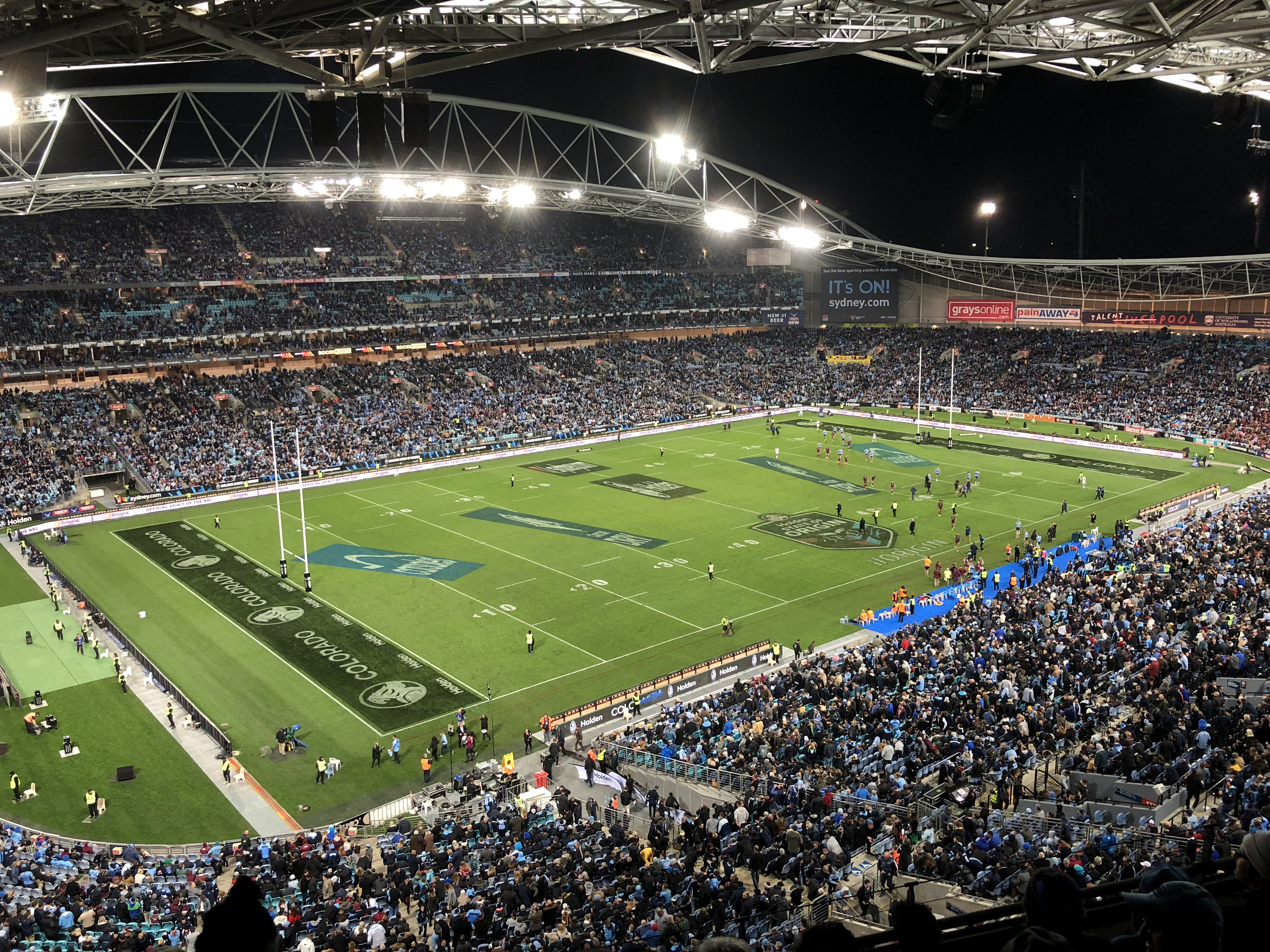
ANZ Stadium, where the match was played

Melbourne and North Queensland have previously played each other in a finals series on three occasions. Their first meeting was in 2005 at, the then named, Aussie Stadium where North Queensland defeated Melbourne 24–16 in the Semi Final. Their second was in 2015, when North Queensland defeated Melbourne 32–12 at Melbourne's AAMI Park to qualify for the Grand Final. Their third meeting was in the 2016 Qualifying Final, when Melbourne defeated North Queensland 16–10 at AAMI Park; Melbourne would earn a week off and finish runners-up that season.

== Teams ==
Melbourne Storm	Position	North Queensland Cowboys
Billy Slater	Fullback	Lachlan Coote
Suliasi Vunivalu	Wing	Kyle Feldt
Will Chambers	Centre	Justin O'Neill
Curtis Scott	Centre	Kane Linnett
Josh Addo-Carr	Wing	Antonio Winterstein
Cameron Munster	Five-eighth	Te Maire Martin
Cooper Cronk	Halfback	Michael Morgan
Jesse Bromwich	Prop	Shaun Fensom
Cameron Smith (c)	Hooker	Jake Granville
Jordan McLean	Prop	Scott Bolton
Felise Kaufusi	2nd Row	Gavin Cooper (c)
Tohu Harris	2nd Row	Ethan Lowe
Dale Finucane	Lock	Jason Taumalolo
Kenny Bromwich	Interchange	Ben Hampton
Tim Glasby	Interchange	Coen Hess
Nelson Asofa-Solomona	Interchange	Corey Jensen
Slade Griffin	Interchange	John Asiata
Craig Bellamy	Coach	Paul Green

Melbourne Storm halfback Cooper Cronk played in his seventh grand final after having previously featured in every premiership decider his club have reached since 2006. It would also be his last game for the Melbourne side after playing 323 first-grade games for the club. Cronk, Will Chambers, Cameron Smith, Jesse Bromwich, and Billy Slater were the last remaining members of their last premiership winning team in 2012. The North Queensland Cowboys had twelve players from their 2015 Premiership winning side. Co-captains Johnathan Thurston and Matt Scott are the most notable absentees from their last Grand Final appearance after both suffered long-term injuries during the season, although Scott was named as a reserve for the starting line-up. They were replaced by Te Maire Martin and Scott Bolton (who was promoted to the starting line-up after coming off the bench in 2015) respectively, with Martin being transferred mid-season from the Penrith Panthers to cover the injured representative halfback. North Queensland utility Ben Hampton made a consecutive Grand Final appearance after playing for the Storm in their loss to the Cronulla-Sutherland Sharks the preceding year's premiership decider.

=== Officials ===
Position			Stand-By
Referees:	Matt Cecchin	Gerard Sutton	Ben Cummins
Touch Judges:	Nick Beashel	Chris Butler	Brett Suttor
Bunker:	Bernard Sutton	Ben Galea	

== Match summary ==
2017 NRL Grand Final

Sunday, 1 October
19:30 AEDT (UTC+11)

Melbourne Storm	34 – 6	North Queensland Cowboys
Tries: 6 Addo-Carr 20', 73'; Kaufusi 28'; Slater 38'; Finucane 64'; Scott 67'; Goals: 5 Smith 21', 29', 39', 65', 75' (5/6)	1st: 18–0; 2nd: 16–6; Report	Tries: 1 Martin 48'; Goals: 1 Lowe 49' (1/1)

ANZ Stadium, Sydney
Attendance: 79,722
Referees: Matt Cecchin, Gerard Sutton
Touch judges: Nick Beashel, Chris Butler
Clive Churchill Medal: Billy Slater (Melbourne)

=== First half ===
It was a tough night for the North Queensland side from the outset when Shaun Fensom was taken out of the game after a freak accident. Fensom tried to prevent a break from Melbourne but was tangled up with teammate Ethan Lowe. His leg was forced sideways and his grand final was over after just three minutes with a suspected broken tibia. After a lengthy stoppage of almost 10 minutes, the Melbourne side looked likely to score first despite some bruising defence from Antonio Winterstein.

The first try came in the 19th minute when Will Chambers pounced on a loose ball 10m from his own line and beat a couple of defenders before offloading to Josh Addo-Carr, who sprinted 75m for the try. Cameron Smith converted and Melbourne lead 6–0. From that point on the Melbourne side went about their business with clinical precision. As usual, it was the kicking game of Cooper Cronk which was on fire, ably supported by his captain Cameron Smith. Cronk forced a dropout with a well-weighted kick and on the resulting play in the 28th minute, Slater drew two defenders and set up Felise Kaufusi who had a clear run to the line and gave Melbourne their second try. Smith converted and Melbourne lead 12–0. It went from bad to worse for North Queensland moments later when Winterstein made an error off a seemingly innocuous Cronk grubber. In a complete team performance, the “Big Three” had their fingerprints all over the execution of the plan and in the 37th minute, Cronk and Smith combined for Slater to slice through past Justin O’Neil for Melbourne's third try. Smith converted and Melbourne lead 18–0. Just before the half time siren, Feldt had set off on a long run after fielding a Cooper Cronk kick. The Melbourne chase reflected the determination of the Melbourne players.

=== Second half ===
After just one penalty in the opening half, the Melbourne side conceded three in a row early in the second. It gave North Queensland a rare chance at the Melbourne try line and in the 47th minute, Te Maire Martin finally broke through Melbourne's defence to score. It was the first points the Melbourne side had conceded in 140 minutes of finals football. Ethan Lowe converted and the Melbourne side lead 18–6. North Queensland began to build pressure but couldn't make the most of further sets inside Melbourne's 20.

Melbourne lock Dale Finucane all but put the game to bed in the 64th minute with a barge over try on the back of an assist from Smith. Smith converted and Melbourne lead 24–6. The night was summed up from North Queensland in the 67th minute when Kane Linnett dropped the ball coming out of the defence. Curtis Scott scored a grand final try in his debut season after receiving a pass from Josh Addo-Carr. Smith missed the conversion and Melbourne lead 28–6.

With the game well and truly over, Melbourne turned into the Harlem Globetrotters with Smith, Cronk, Slater and Tohu Harris combining in the 73rd minute for a party-trick to set up Addo-Carr for his second try of the night. Smith converted and Melbourne won 34–6.

== Opening games ==
=== Holden Cup NYC Grand Final ===
This was the last ever match of the National Youth Competition, which was scrapped after 10 seasons in favour of a return to state-based Under 20s.

Sunday, 1 October
1:35pm (AEDT)

Parramatta Eels U20s	18 – 20	Manly Warringah Sea Eagles U20s
Tries: Dylan Brown (3') 1 Denzal Tonise (16') 1 Greg Leleisiuao (67') 1 Goals: Dylan Brown 3/4 (4', 11' pen, 17')	1st: 14 – 10; 2nd: 4 – 10	Tries: 1 (29') Tevita Funa; 1 (40') Bilal Maarbani; 1 (43') Blake Andrews; 1 (79') Keith Titmuss; Goals: 2/4 Tevita Funa (40', 80')

ANZ Stadium, Sydney
Referee: Phil Henderson, Adam Cassidy
Jack Gibson Medal: Cade Cust

=== NRL State Championship ===
The 2017 State Championship match featured the NSW Cup Premiers Penrith facing Queensland Cup premiers the Papua New Guinea Hunters.

Sunday, 1 October
3:40pm (AEDT)

Penrith Panthers	42 – 18	Papua New Guinea Hunters
Tries: Tony Satini (9', 11', 16', 40') 4 Darren Nicholls (20') 1 Viliame Kikau (31') 1 Christian Crichton (38') 1 Maika Sivo (47') 1 Goals: Darren Nicholls 5/8 (13', 17', 22', 34', 39'); Sin Bin: Jarome Luai (68')	1st: 38 – 2; 2nd: 4 – 16	Tries: 1 (69') Adex Wera; 1 (72') Bland Abavu; 1 (77') Ase Boas; Goals: 3/4 Ase Boas (3' pen, 70', 77')

ANZ Stadium, Sydney
Referee: Jarrod Cole, Chris Treneman
Man-of-the-Match medal: Kaide Ellis

== Aftermath ==
By winning the Grand Final, the Melbourne Storm qualified for the 2018 World Club Challenge against the Super League XXII champions Leeds Rhinos. The match would be staged in Australia for only the fourth time, where the Storm defeated the Rhinos 38–4.

== Pre-match entertainment ==
American rapper Macklemore was booked to perform four songs, accompanied by singers Eric Nally and Mary Lambert, including "Same Love". The song topped the Australian charts in 2013, and was regarded as an anthem for same-sex marriage advocates during the campaign in Macklemore's home state of Washington. In the days leading up to the grand final, the single returned to the top of the Australian iTunes charts.

Several prominent conservative politicians voiced strong opposition to the scheduled performance of "Same Love", given its high-profile support for the 'Yes' campaign during the voting period of the Australian Marriage Law Postal Survey. Former Prime Minister Tony Abbott tweeted his disapproval of a "politicised grand final," while North Queensland crossbencher Bob Katter described allowing Macklemore's grand final performance as "tantamount to seeping sewage into the debutante ball." Macklemore acknowledged the controversy several days before the final, but vowed to "go harder" as a result.

== See also ==
- NRL Premiership winners
- 2017 NRL Finals Series
