= Cameron Munster =

Australia international rugby league footballer

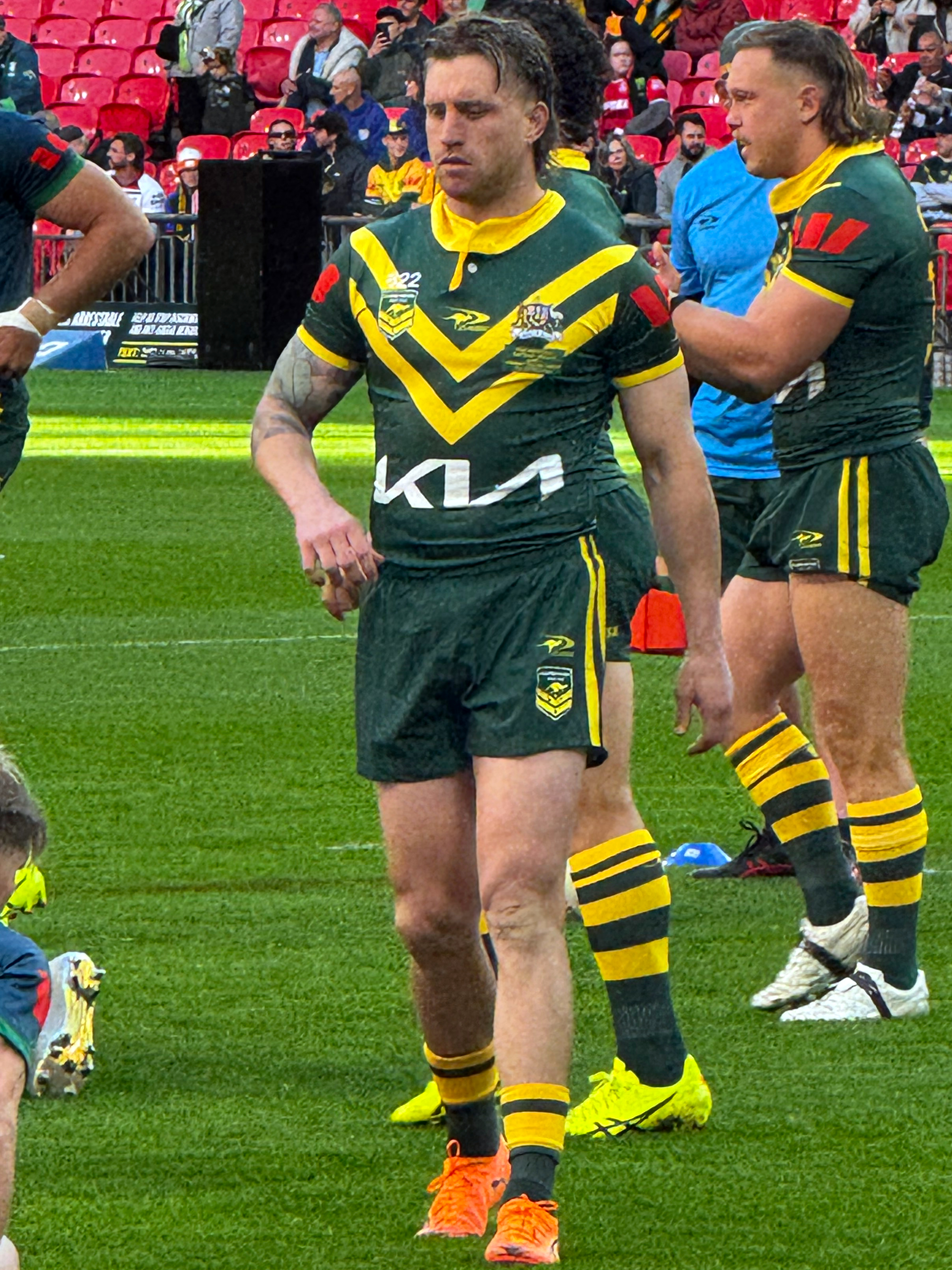

Personal information
- Full name: Cameron Munster
- Born: 13 September 1994 (age 32) Rockhampton, Queensland, Australia
- Height: 185 cm (6 ft 1 in)
- Weight: 89 kg (14 st 0 lb)

Playing information
- Position: Five-eighth, Fullback
Club
Years	Team	Pld	T	G	FG	P
2014–	Melbourne Storm	255	65	47	2	358
Representative
Years	Team	Pld	T	G	FG	P
2017–26	Queensland	24	4	0	0	16
2017–	Australia	19	5	15	0	50
- Source: As of 22 November 2026

Cameron Munster (born 13 September 1994) is an Australian professional rugby league footballer who plays as a five-eighth for the Melbourne Storm in the National Rugby League (NRL) and captains Queensland in State of Origin.

Munster has represented Queensland in State of Origin, winning five series (including one as captain) and receiving the Wally Lewis Medal in the 2020 series for Player of the Series. Munster has played for Australia at international level, winning the 2022 and 2026 Rugby League World Cups at five-eighth. Munster has also played centre for Australia. Munster has played in five NRL Grand Finals, winning two of them, featuring at fullback in the 2016 NRL Grand Final and at five-eighth in the 2017 NRL Grand Final, 2018 NRL Grand Final and the 2020 NRL Grand Final. Munster won the 2017 NRL Grand Final, 2018 World Club Challenge and 2020 NRL Grand Final at five-eighth with Melbourne. He played and debuted as a fullback earlier in his career with enormous success and has represented Queensland in that position but moved to five-eighth upon Billy Slater's return from injury in 2017.

== Early life ==
Munster was born in Rockhampton, Queensland, Australia. He was educated at Berserker Street State School then Emmaus College, Rockhampton.

He played his junior rugby league for the North Knights at five-eighth, before being signed by the Central Queensland Capras in the Queensland Cup. In June 2013, he signed a two-year contract with the Melbourne Storm. Before signing with Melbourne, Central Queensland head coach and former Canterbury player Jason Hetherington had phoned the Canterbury-Bankstown recruitment team recommending that they sign Munster but he was told the club had no interest in signing the player. Hetherington spoke to The Sydney Morning Herald saying "I made a few phone calls and just tried to find an opportunity for him. Obviously my alliance and heart lies with the Bulldogs and I went that direction first, I would have liked for them to have shown a bit more interest to be honest with you, but it's a competitive world out there".

On 21 September 2013, he won the Queensland Cup Rookie of the Year award.

== Playing career ==
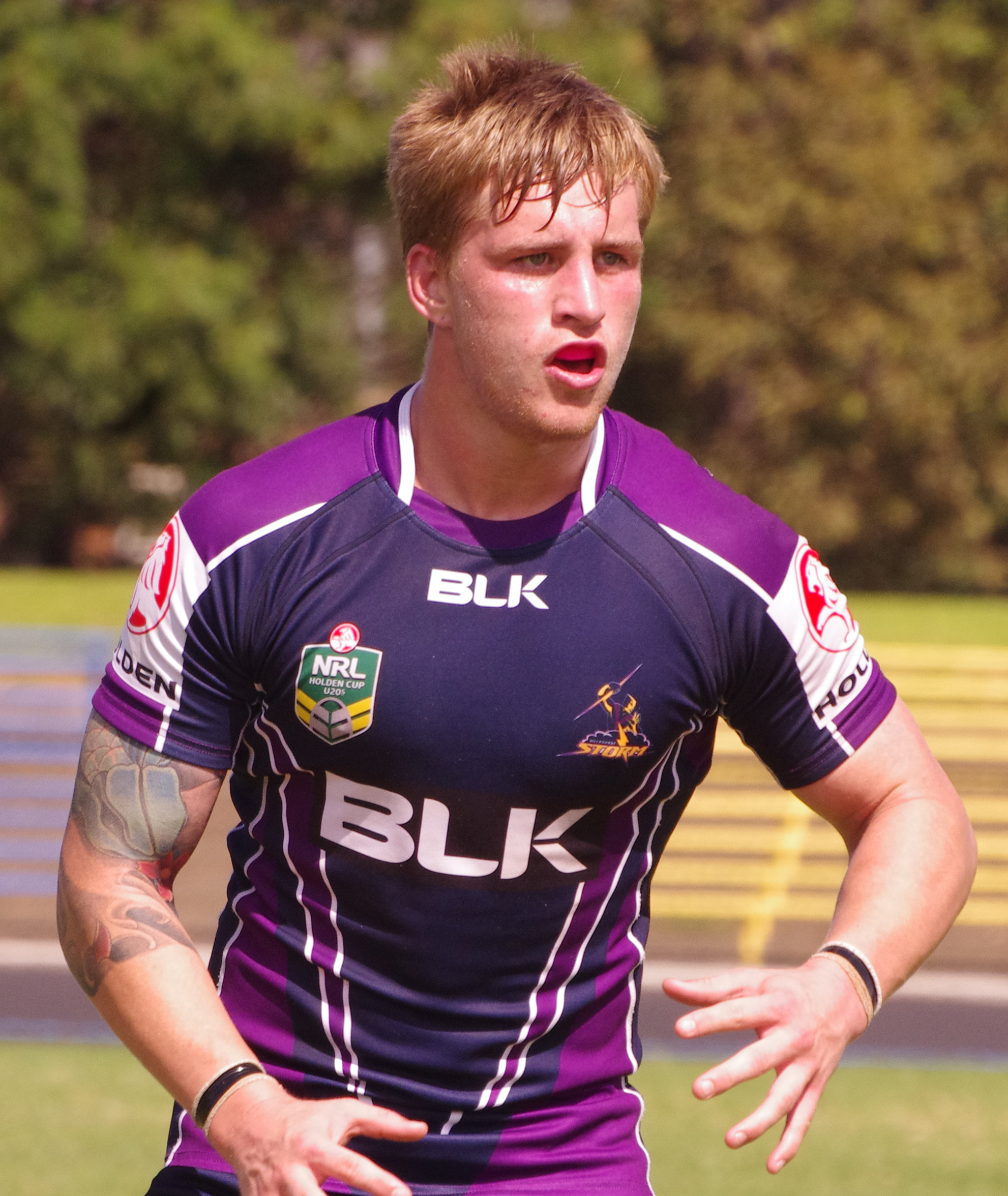
Munster playing for Melbourne in 2014

=== 2014 ===
Munster played for the Storm's NYC team in the earlier rounds of 2014, playing 9 games, scoring 7 tries and kicking 33 goals, before moving on to the Storm's Queensland Cup team, Eastern Suburbs Tigers. On 18 March, he extended his contract with the Storm until the end of 2017. On 3 May, he played for the Queensland Under-20s team against the New South Wales Under-20s team, playing off the interchange bench in the 30–8 loss at Penrith Stadium. In Round 12 of the 2014 NRL season, he made his NRL debut for the Storm against the North Queensland Cowboys.

=== 2015 ===
In round 6 against the Canberra Raiders, Munster returned for the Storm, filling in for the injured Billy Slater at fullback and also scoring his first NRL career try in the 14–10 win at Canberra Stadium.

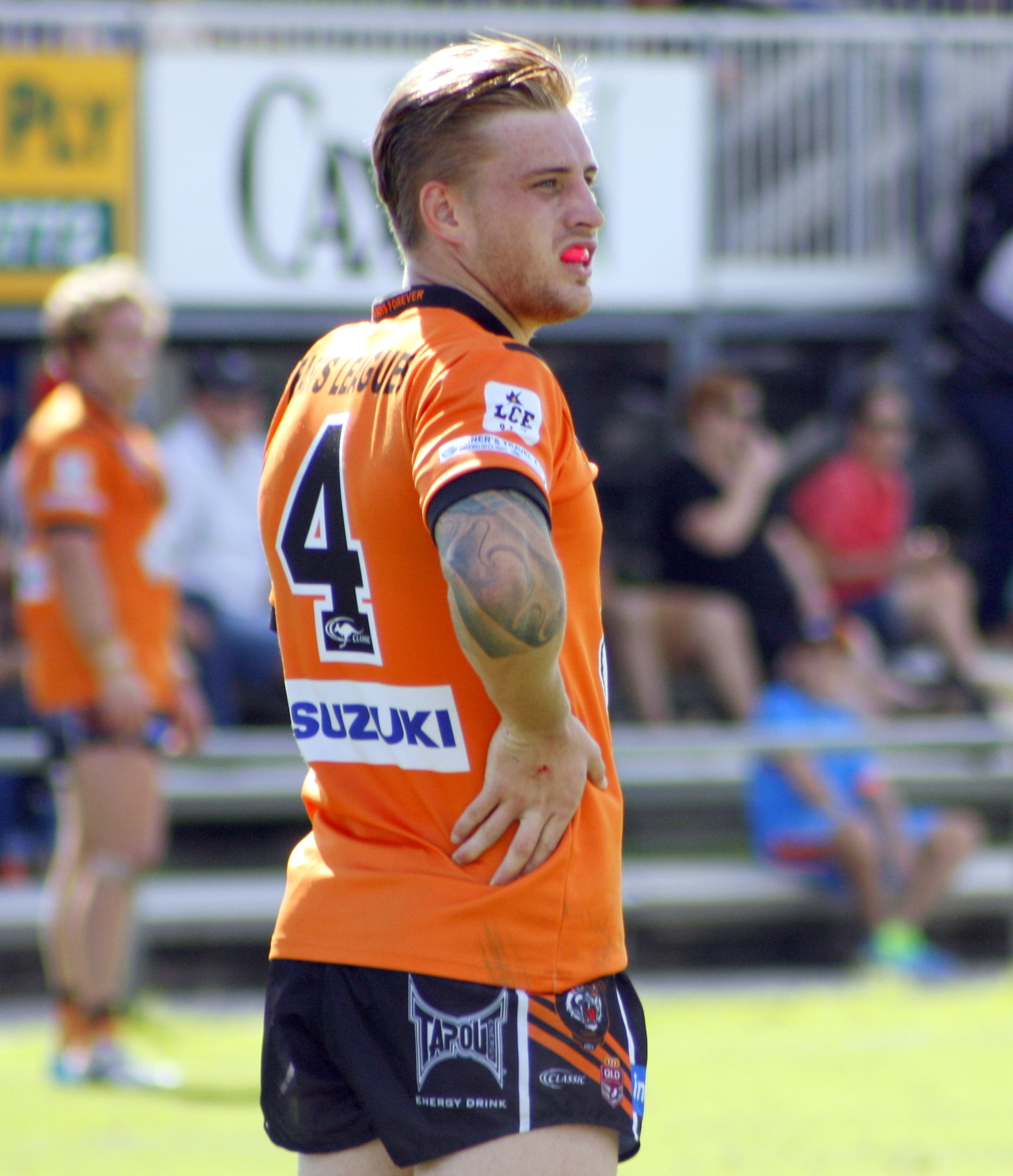
Munster playing for the Easts Tigers in 2015

From Round 12 onwards after incumbent fullback Billy Slater was ruled out for the rest of the year due to a shoulder injury, Munster stepped up and filled in the vacant position at ease. In Round 22 against the Gold Coast Titans, he scored a hat trick in the Storm's 36–14 win at AAMI Park. Munster finished his promising 2015 NRL season with him playing in 19 matches and scoring 7 tries for the Storm.

=== 2016 ===
On 12 January, Munster was selected in the QAS Emerging Origin squad. On 31 January, while in the Emerging Maroons camp, he broke curfew and the QRL announced he would be excluded from its representative programs for the next 12 months. On 1 February, he was named in the Storm's 2016 Auckland Nines squad. Munster started the 2016 season playing at centre in round 1 against the St George Illawarra Dragons in the 18–16 win at AAMI Park.

Following Billy Slater's season-ending shoulder injury, Munster took over the fullback role for the rest of the season. On 11 May 2016, Munster extended his contract with the Melbourne Storm to the end of the 2019 season, earning around $2 million within those years.

On 2 October 2016, in the Storm's 2016 NRL Grand Final against the Cronulla-Sutherland Sharks, Munster played at fullback in the 14–12 defeat. Munster finished the 2016 NRL season with him playing in 24 matches and scoring 4 tries for the Storm.

=== 2017 ===
With Billy Slater set to return Fullback and to action from a shoulder injury which ended his 2016 season (after round 1), Munster was expected to spend time playing five-eighth following Blake Green's departure to Manly, in the 2017 season. However, with coach Craig Bellamy opted to rest Billy Slater for the opening 2 rounds of the season, Munster filled-in again at fullback with Ryley Jacks playing five-eighth. When fullback Billy Slater made his return from injury (coming off the bench in the 28th minute) in the Storm's Round 3 home game against the Brisbane Broncos, Munster then took over the five-eighth role. Following that Round 3 game, he was then ruled out of action with a fractured cheekbone until Round 7. Munster then took back the five-eighth role (combining in the team's spine combination with captain Cameron Smith at Hooker, Cooper Cronk at Halfback and Billy Slater at Fullback), producing a number of great performances.

Munster was part of the Queensland Maroons Origin Squad for game 2 of the 2017 State of Origin Series as being 18th Man. Following a season-ending shoulder injury to Johnathan Thurston, Munster was selected to make his State of Origin debut, being selected at five-eighth with Michael Morgan shifting to the centres in the series deciding Game 3 match. On-debut, he produced an outstanding performance combining with his Storm team-mates in QLD's one-club spine combination of Cameron Smith at Hooker, Cooper Cronk at Halfback and Billy Slater at Fullback; to help QLD to a series win in the 22–6 victory over NSW at Suncorp Stadium.

On 1 October 2017, in the Storm's 2017 NRL Grand Final against the North Queensland Cowboys, Munster played at five-eighth in the 34–6 victory. Munster finished off a great 2017 NRL season with him playing in 21 matches, scoring 1 try and kicking 12 goals for the Storm.

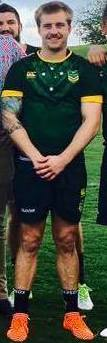
Munster representing Australia in 2017

On 3 October 2017, Munster was rewarded with selection in the 24-man Kangaroos squad for the 2017 Rugby League World Cup. On 3 November 2017, Munster made his test debut for Australia against France, where he started at halfback in place for James Maloney who pulled out of the match the night beforehand for personal reasons and scored 2 tries in the 52–6 win at Canberra Stadium. Australia would go on to win the final 6-0 over England.

=== 2018 ===
Munster played in both the 2018 World Club Challenge and 2018 NRL Grand Final. He was sin-binned twice in one game during Melbourne's Grand Final loss to the Sydney Roosters. Munster's second sin binning in the game came after he kicked Sydney Roosters player Joseph Manu in the back of the head.

In November 2018, Munster re-signed with Melbourne until the end of 2023.

=== 2019 ===
In the 2019 NRL season, Munster played 24 games as the club finished as runaway minor premiers. Munster played in the club's preliminary final defeat against the Sydney Roosters at the Sydney Cricket Ground.

On 7 October 2019, Munster was named in the Australian side for the upcoming Oceania Cup fixtures.

=== 2020 ===
In the 2020 NRL season, Munster played 17 games as the competition was reduced to 20 regular season rounds due to COVID-19. The Storm relocated to the Sunshine Coast. Nevertheless, Munster and his side were triumphant, after dominant finals wins over both Parramatta and Canberra (played in Brisbane), before playing the grand final in Sydney. On 25 October 2020, Munster played for Melbourne in their 26–20 Grand Final win over Penrith, winning his second premiership with the club.

On 4 November 2020, Munster scored his first State of Origin try in Queensland's 18–14 win in game 1 of the 2020 State of Origin series. Munster lasted minutes into Game 2, where he was ruled out with a HIA after a concussion in the early stages.

On 18 November 2020, Munster returned and played in Queensland's 20–14 win clinching the 2020 State of Origin series where he was awarded the man of the match, and the Wally Lewis Medal for man of the series, capping off a dominant year for the Storm halve.

=== 2021 ===
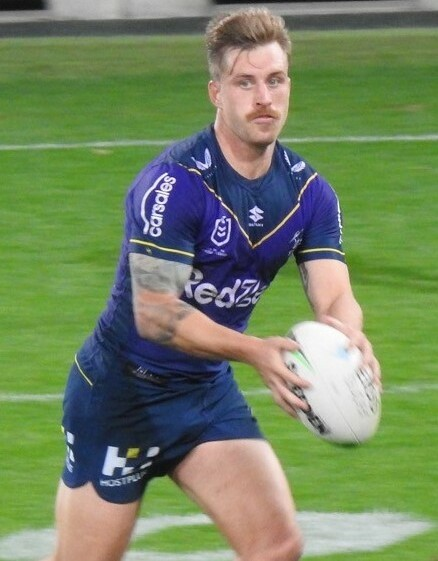
Munster playing for Melbourne in 2021

Munster was selected by Queensland for game one of the 2021 State of Origin series after returning from injury. During game one, Munster was placed on report after kicking New South Wales player Liam Martin as he attempted to play the ball. Queensland would go on to lose game one 50-6.

The following week, Munster was placed on report for kicking another opponent, this time during Melbourne's victory over the New Zealand Warriors.

Munster played a total of 21 games for Melbourne in the 2021 NRL season as the club won 19 matches in a row and claimed the Minor Premiership. Munster played in all three finals matches including the preliminary final where Melbourne suffered a shock 10-6 loss against eventual premiers Penrith.

=== 2022 ===
Munster received praise in 2022, with Rugby League Immortal Andrew Johns saying, "Munster is on his own, he's in another stratosphere. He's gone beyond superstar status." on his podcast Immortal Behaviour in the lead up to State of Origin.

Munster was again Man of the Match in Origin in the first game, which was a 16-10 Queensland victory. Munster drew comparisons to Wally Lewis from retired Queensland captain Paul Vautin after the match. "He's getting closer to (Lewis) with the way he's playing," Vautin said. "He's an instinctive player, as Wally Lewis was. Wally wasn't structured by any imagination, but he was instinctive, and so is Cameron Munster." Andrew Johns agreed, "He's just on another planet at the moment, no one is near him, you cannot coach against him because he is so unpredictable. He's on a stratosphere which is up there, we compared him in post game to Wally Lewis and that was Wally Lewis like. The bigger the occasion, the more pressure, the better he goes. You can't stop him, you can't coach against him and you can not stop him".

Munster scored his second Origin try in game 2 of the 2022 State of Origin series however QLD lost 44-12, sending it to a Suncorp decider.

On 8 July 2022, less than a week out of the Origin decider, breaking news began circulating that both Munster and Queensland winger Murray Taulagi had returned positive Rapid Antigen Tests for COVID-19. It was confirmed the following morning that they had returned positive PCR swabs, ruling the pair out of the match.

In round 21 of the 2022 NRL season, Munster, starting a game at fullback for the first time since the 2019 State of Origin series decider scored the second hat-trick of his career in Melbourne's victory over the bottom placed Gold Coast Titans.

On 3 October 2022, Munster was named in the Kangaroos squad for the 2022 World Cup. Munster earned a man of the match in the tournament opener against Fiji, and Australia would go on to triumph against Samoa in the World Cup final.

On 6 October 2022, Munster re-signed with the Storm on a four-year contract until the end of the 2027 season.

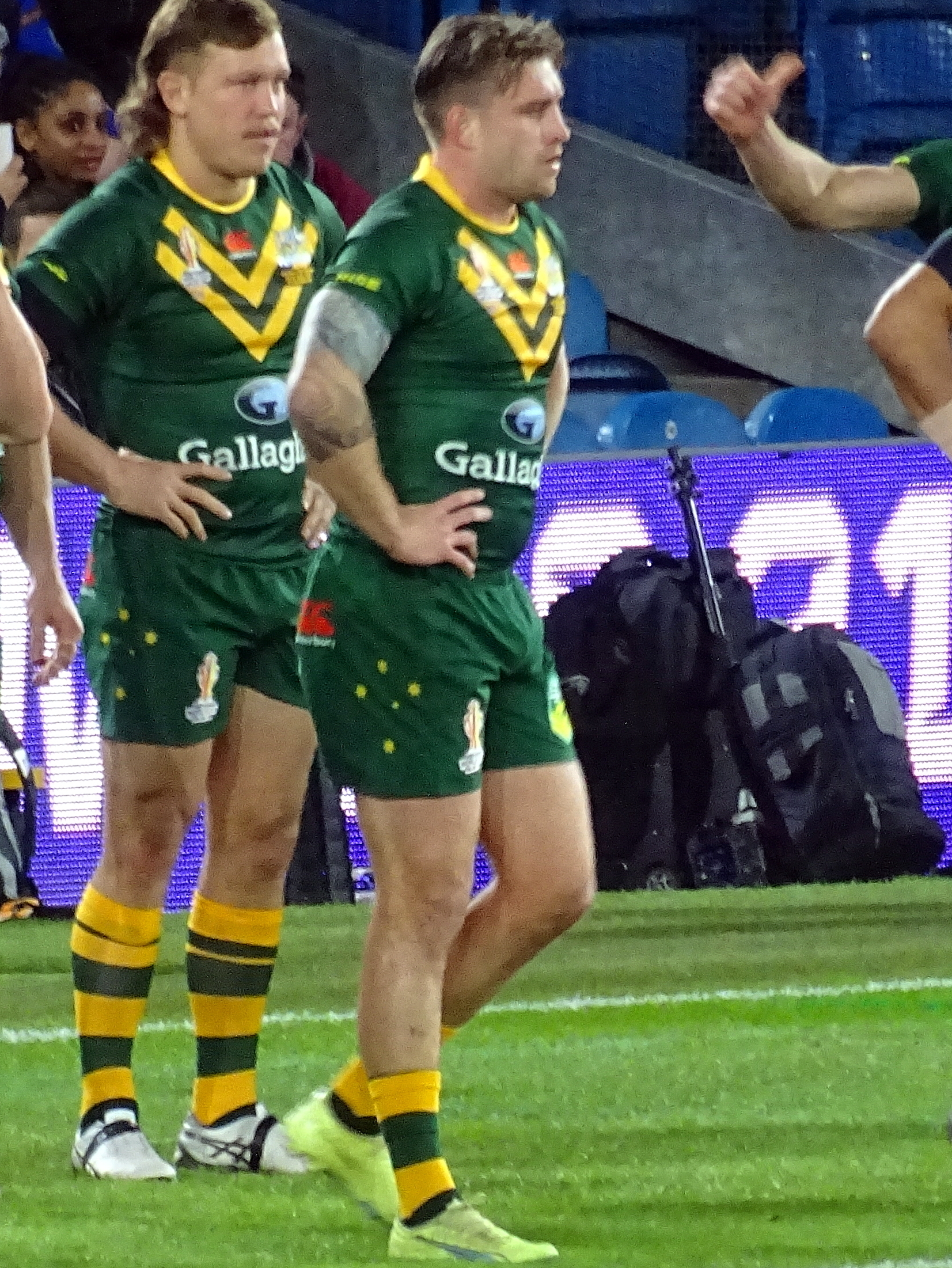
Munster warming up for Australia in 2022

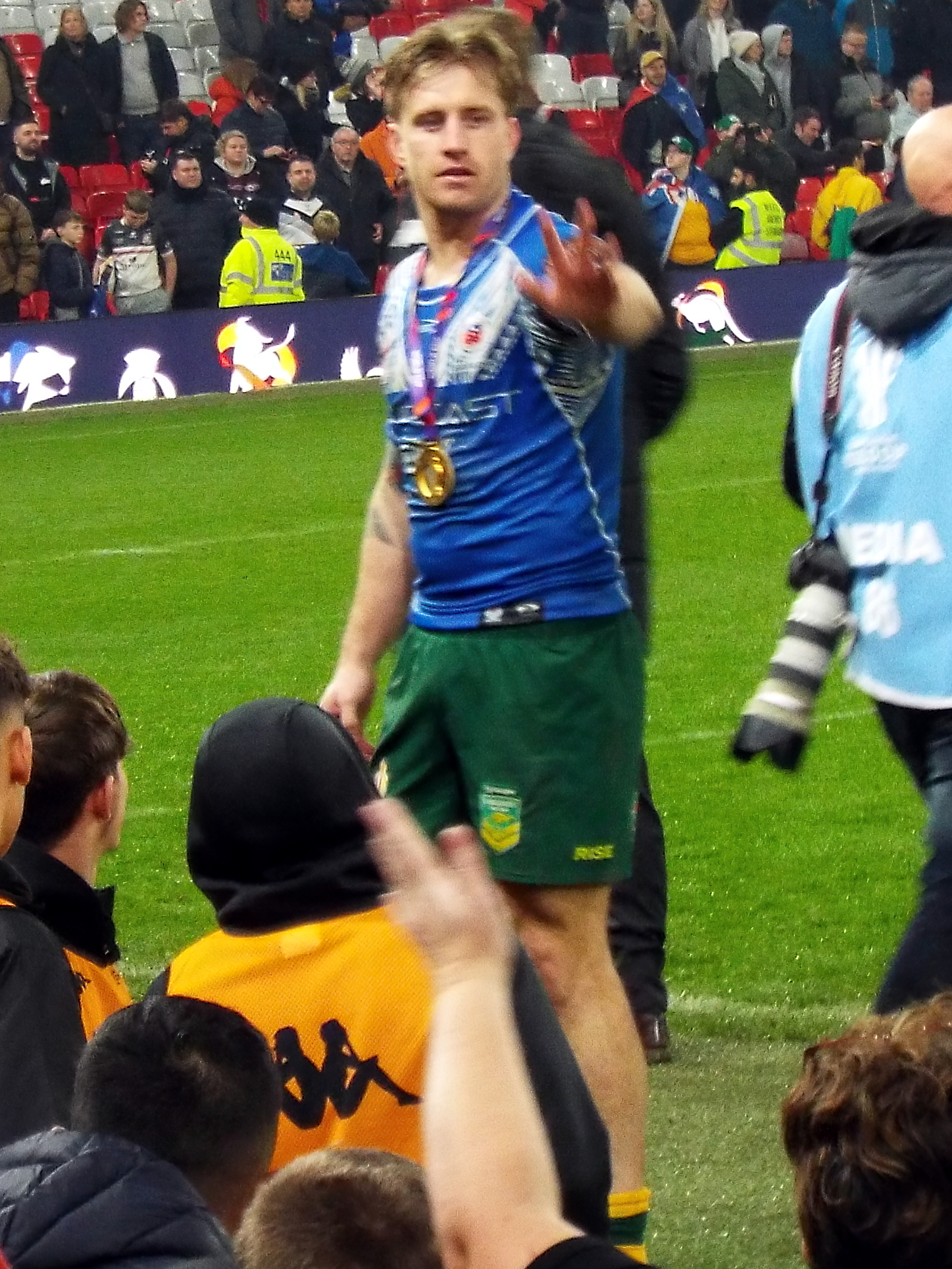
Munster in a Samoa shirt after winning the 2021 RLWC Final in 2022

=== 2023 ===
Munster played in all three games of the 2023 State of Origin series which saw Queensland win 2-1. Notably Munster starred in the opening Origin match in Adelaide, where whilst a player down, he set up try to take the lead, and then scored one himself.

Munster played 22 games for Melbourne in the 2023 NRL season as the club finished third on the table. In the opening round, a golden point thriller against Parramatta, Munster played on with a nasty compound fracture to his finger, playing a key role including setting up a try off scrum to send the match to overtime.

He then played in all three finals matches, kicking a cross field kick in the dying stages to send Will Warbrick over to score in the elimination final against Sydney, sending the Storm through to the preliminary final, where Melbourne were defeated by Penrith.

Munster was included in the RLPA's dream team at five-eighth.

=== 2024 ===
In round 11, Munster injured his groin during Melbourne's 48-16 win against Parramatta. Munster returned to action in Melbourne's round 21 clash against the Eels. Munster later confirmed he would require surgery at the end of the season.

On 21 August 2024, Munster was inducted as a life member of the Melbourne Storm. Munster played a total of 17 games for Melbourne in the 2024 NRL season as the club were runaway minor premiers. He scored the opening try in Melbourne's semi-final match against Cronulla, before scoring a double in the preliminary final win over the Roosters.

Munster played in Melbourne's 2024 NRL Grand Final loss against Penrith. In the second half of the match, Munster was placed on report, but ultimately later cleared, for allegedly biting Penrith's Paul Alamoti.

=== 2025 ===
Munster played in all three State of Origin matches, losing the opener in Brisbane. Slater then promoted Munster with the captaincy, in which he took home a man of the match award in his first match as captain, during their 26-24 win over NSW, in Perth.

During preparation for Game 3, a memorable win, he would exit camp after the sudden death of his father. Munster exited the team on the Sunday, and rejoined camp to play on Wednesday 10 July 2025.

Munster played 24 games for Melbourne, topping the clubs try assists for 2025 NRL season, starring in their semi-final and preliminary final wins over Canterbury Bankstown and Cronulla. He then featured in their 26-22 2025 NRL Grand Final loss against Brisbane.

Munster then played for Australia at the Ashes, scoring a try and taking home man of the match in Game 2, and then winning the Player of the Series award.

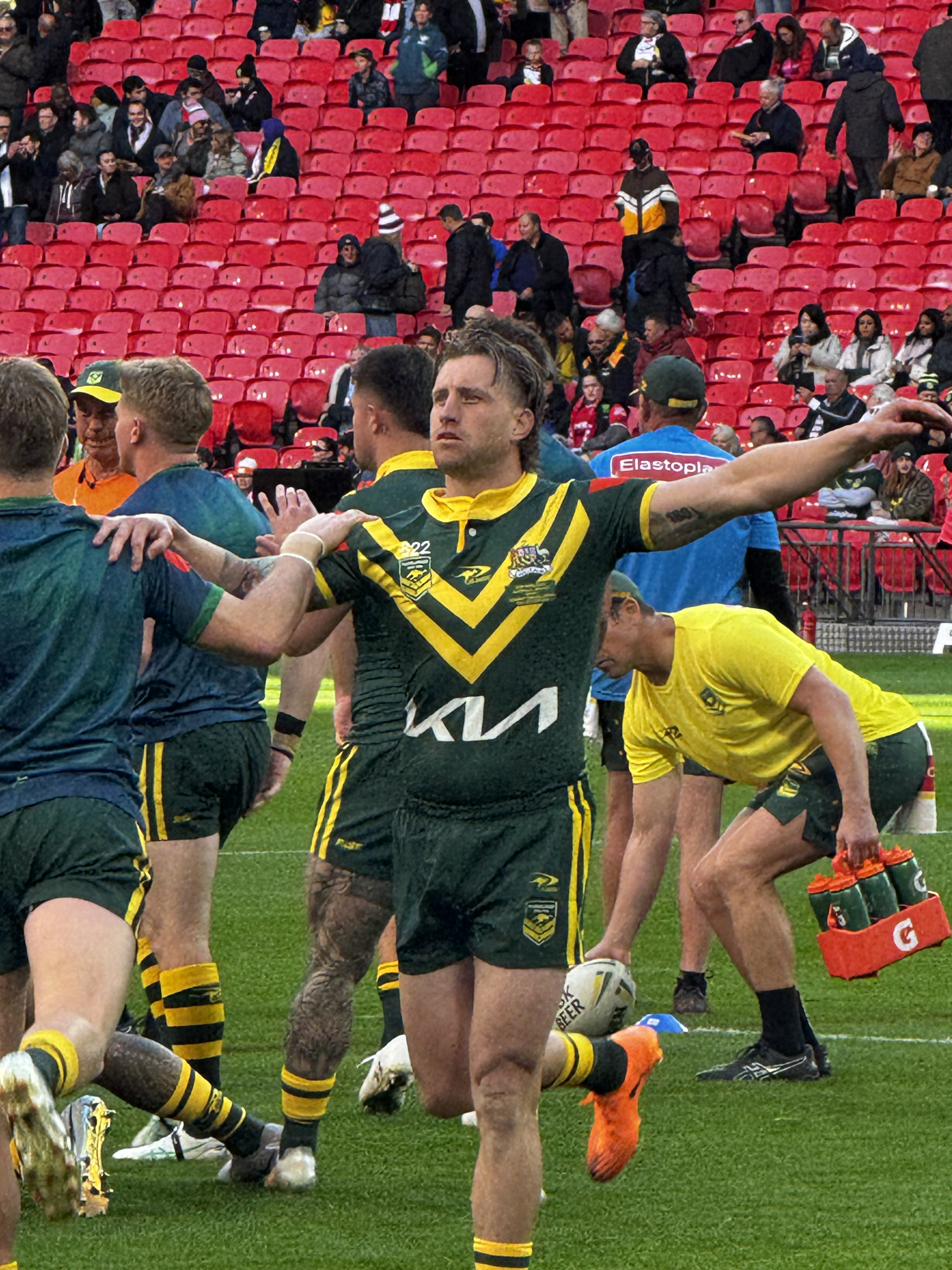
Munster warming up for Australia in 2025

=== 2026 ===
Munster featured in 19 games for Melbourne in the 2026 NRL season as the club finished 10th on the table, missing the finals for the first time since 2010.

He then played for Australia, winning his second World Cup at the 2026 Rugby League World Cup, starring in their semi-final win over Samoa with three try assists, and winning the final 32-12 over New Zealand.

== Personal life ==
Munster married Bianca McMahon on 31 December 2023. His father, Steven, died on 6 July 2025.

== Controversy ==
In September 2021, a video was leaked to the media which showed Munster along with Melbourne players Brandon Smith and Chris Lewis partying with what appeared to be cocaine being used by Smith. Munster made a public apology for the incident.

On 5 October 2021, following an investigation by the NRL's Integrity Unit, Munster was fined a total of $30,000 ($100,000 suspended) and he was also suspended from one match. Munster was also stood down from Melbourne's leadership group. Munster vowed to enter an alcohol rehabilitation centre for four weeks and said he would abstain from alcohol for a period of twelve months.

Munster's rehabilitation turned his career around, with many praising his efforts and sobriety. His 2022 turn around season included an Origin series win, finals appearance, and individual accolades including an Origin man of the match, Dally M five-eighth, and Melbourne Storm's player of the Year award.

== Honours ==
Individual

- RLPA Rookie of the Year: 2015
- Melbourne Storm Rookie of The Year: 2015
- Melbourne Storm Back of The Year: 2015
- Melbourne Storm Most Improved: 2016
- Melbourne Storm Members' Player of The Year: 2018, 2022
- Melbourne Storm Cameron Smith Player of The Year: 2018, 2022
- Dally M Five-Eighth of The Year: 2018, 2019, 2022
- RLPA Five-Eighth of The Year: 2018, 2019, 2022
- Peter Jackson Memorial Award: 2019
- Wally Lewis Medal: 2020
- Melbourne Storm Life Member (#160): 2024
- Queensland Maroons Captain: 2025
- Dick "Tosser" Turner Medal: 2025
- Fulton–Reilly Award (Ashes Player of the Series): 2025

Club

- 2016 Minor Premiership Winners
- 2016 NRL Grand Final Runner-up
- 2017 Minor Premiership Winners
- 2017 NRL Grand Final Winners
- 2018 World Club Challenge Winners
- 2018 NRL Grand Final Runner-up
- 2019 Minor Premiership Winners
- 2020 NRL Grand Final Winners
- 2021 Minor Premiership Winners
- 2024 Minor Premiership Winners
- 2024 NRL Grand Final Runner-up
- 2025 NRL Grand Final Runner-up

Representative

- 2017 State of Origin series Winners
- 2020 State of Origin series Winners
- 2022 State of Origin series Winners
- 2022 Rugby League World Cup Winners
- 2023 State of Origin series Winners
- 2025 State of Origin series Winner
- 2025 Ashes Series Winners
- 2026 Rugby League World Cup Winners

== Statistics ==
=== NRL ===
Statistics are correct as of end of round 21 of the 2026 season

†	Denotes seasons in which Munster won an NRL Premiership

Season	Team	Matches	T	G	GK %	F/G	Pts	W	L	D	W–L %
2014	Melbourne Storm	1	0	–	–	0	0	0	1	0	0.00
2015	Melbourne Storm	19	7	–	–	0	28	10	9	0	52.63
2016	Melbourne Storm	24	4	–	–	0	16	19	5	0	79.17
2017†	Melbourne Storm	21	1	12	52.17	0	28	19	2	0	90.48
2018	Melbourne Storm	24	4	2	100.00	2	22	16	8	0	66.67
2019	Melbourne Storm	24	8	2	50.00	0	36	18	6	0	75.00
2020†	Melbourne Storm	18	4	6	75.00	1	29	16	2	0	88.89
2021	Melbourne Storm	20	7	16	53.33	0	28	16	4	0	80.00
2022	Melbourne Storm	22	11	7	63.64	0	58	14	8	0	63.64
2023	Melbourne Storm	22	8	1	50.50	1	35	14	8	0	63.64
2024	Melbourne Storm	17	5			0	20	13	4	0	76.47
2025	Melbourne Storm	24	2			0	8	16	8	0	66.67
2026*	Melbourne Storm	15	4	1					18		
Career totals		251	65	47	57.50	4	358	171	65	0	72.46

* = Unfinished season

=== State of Origin ===
†	Denotes seasons in which Munster won a State of Origin Series

Season	Team	Matches	T	G	GK %	F/G	Pts	W	L	D	W–L %
2017†	Queensland	1	0	–	–	0	0	1	0	0	100.00
2018	Queensland	3	0	–	–	0	0	1	2	0	33.33
2019	Queensland	3	0	–	–	0	0	1	2	0	33.33
2020†	Queensland	3	1	–	–	0	4	2	1	0	66.67
2021	Queensland	3	0	–	–	0	0	1	2	0	33.33
2022†	Queensland	2	1	–	–	0	4	1	1	0	50.00
2023†	Queensland	3	1	–	–	0	4	2	1	0	75.00
2025†	Queensland	3	1	–	–	0	4	2	1	0	75.00
2026	Queensland	2	0	–	–	0	0	1	1	0	50.00
Career totals		23	4	–	–	0	16	12	11	0	52.17

=== Australia ===
†	Denotes years in which Munster won a World Cup Title

Season	Team	Matches	T	G	GK %	F/G	Pts	W	L	D	W–L %
2017†	Australia	2	4	0	0.00	0	16	2	0	0	100.00
2019	Australia	2	0	–	–	0	0	1	1	0	50.00
2022†	Australia	5	0	–	–	0	0	5	5	0	100.00
2023	Australia	3	0	–	–	0	0	2	1	0	75.00
2025	Australia	3	1	-	-	0	4	3	0	0	100
2026†	Australia	4	0	15	68.2	0	30	4	0	0	100
Career totals		12	4	0	62.5	0	16	10	2	0	89.4

NOTE: In 2017 Cameron Munster was a member of the World Cup winning squad however did not play in the World Cup Final
