= Will Chambers =

Australia international rugby league and union footballer

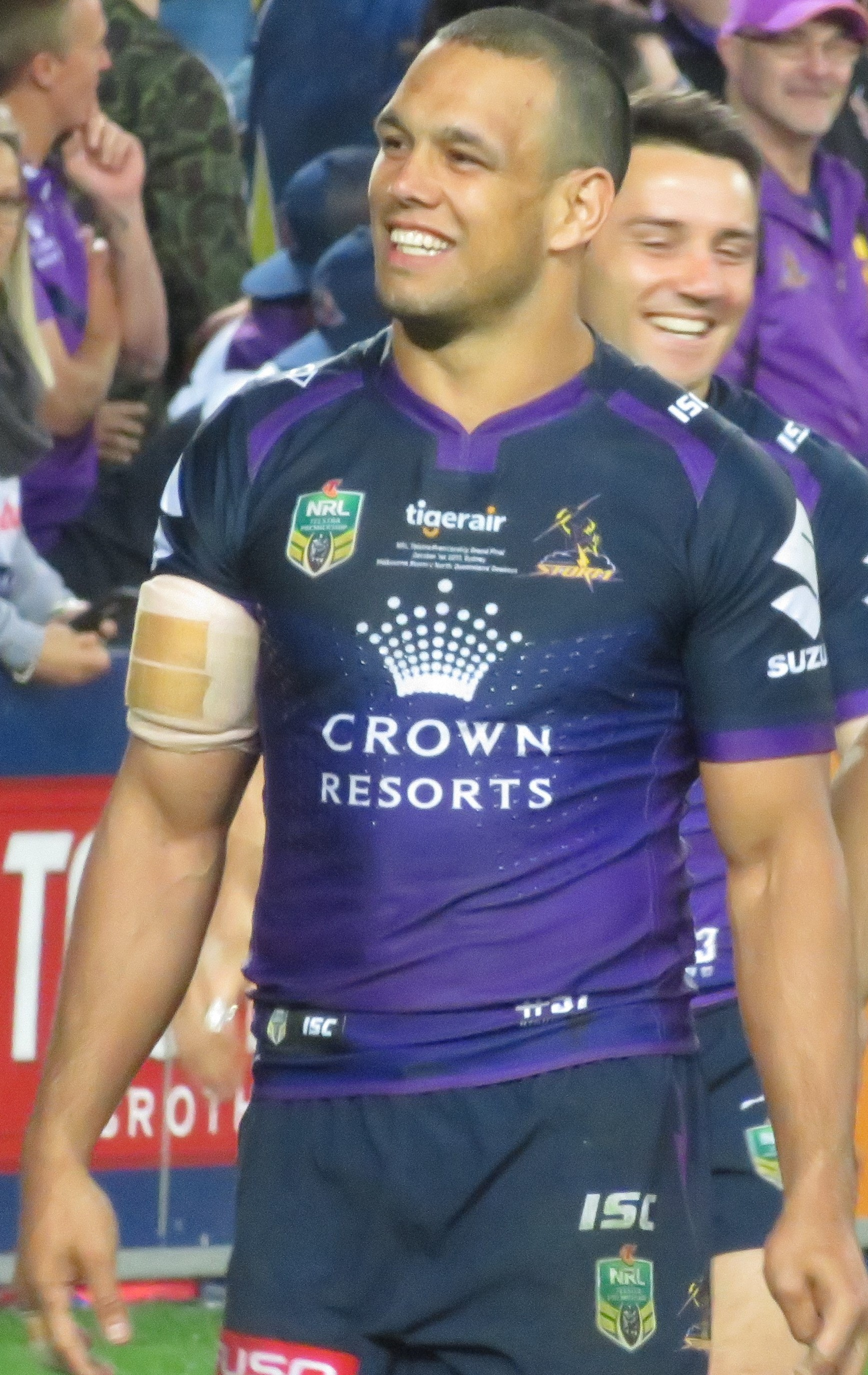

Personal information
- Full name: William Chambers
- Born: 26 May 1988 (age 38) Brisbane, Queensland, Australia
- Height: 190 cm (6 ft 3 in)
- Weight: 100 kg (15 st 10 lb)

Playing information

Rugby league
- Position: Centre
Club
Years	Team	Pld	T	G	FG	P
2007–10	Melbourne Storm	43	16	0	0	64
2012–19	Melbourne Storm	175	68	2	0	276
2021	Cronulla Sharks	8	1	0	0	4
	Total	226	85	2	0	344
Representative
Years	Team	Pld	T	G	FG	P
2014–19	Queensland	13	4	0	0	16
2015–17	Australia	7	2	0	0	8
2014–19	Prime Minister's XIII	1	1	0	0	4
2015–19	Indigenous All Stars	3	1	0	0	4

Rugby union
- Position: Outside Centre
Club
Years	Team	Pld	T	G	FG	P
2010–11	Queensland Reds	26	5	0	0	25
2011–12	Munster	8	1	0	0	5
2019–21	Suntory Sungoliath	2	0	0	0	0
2022	LA Giltinis	7	2	0	0	10
	Total	43	8	0	0	40
- Source: As of 6 March 2023

William Chambers (born 26 May 1988 in Brisbane) is an Australian former professional rugby league and union footballer who last played for the LA Giltinis in Major League Rugby (MLR) in the United States. After winning two titles with the Melbourne Storm, he retired from Australia's NRL in 2021.

He previously played at centre for the Melbourne Storm and Cronulla-Sutherland Sharks in the National Rugby League and Australia at international level in rugby league. He had played his entire NRL career until the end of the 2019 NRL season at the Storm, winning the 2012 and 2017 Grand Finals with them. He has played for Queensland in the State of Origin series, Prime Minister's XIII and the Indigenous All Stars.

Chambers also played rugby union for the Queensland Reds, Munster and Suntory Sungoliath.

== Early life ==
Chambers was born in Brisbane, Queensland, Australia into a family of Indigenous Australian (Yolngu) descent but moved to the remote Northern Territory town of Nhulunbuy at 2 years of age.

He began playing junior football for Nhulunbuy in the Northern Territory Rugby League competition. At the age of 13, he returned to Brisbane and played schoolboy football for St Joseph's College, Nudgee. As a schoolboy, Chambers was signed by the Melbourne Storm to compete in the National Rugby League from 2006. Along with rugby league, Chambers also played Australian rules football in his younger years and returned to the code in 2023 when he signed up to play for St Kilda City in the Southern Football Netball League.

== Career ==
=== Rugby League ===
==== 2007 - 2009: Melbourne Storm ====
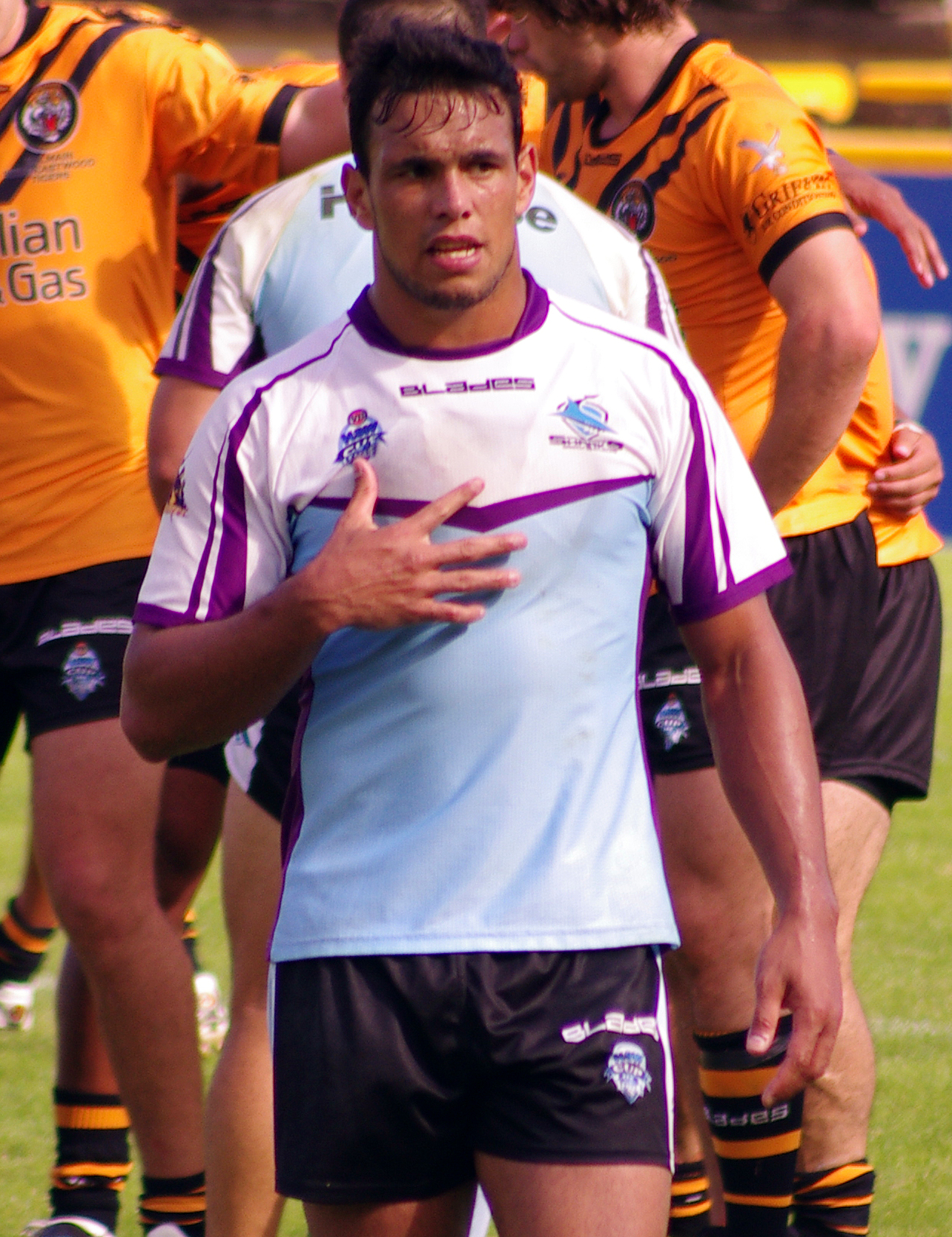
Chambers playing NSW Cup for Cronulla

Will Chambers' senior career began with the Melbourne Storm in the NRL. His usual position is as a centre or wing. Chambers also played for Brisbane Norths in the Queensland Cup. When Matt King departed the Melbourne Storm after their 2007 NRL Grand Final victory, he nominated rookie Melbourne Storm centre Will Chambers as the man to take his place.

Chambers final game for Melbourne in this period was the 2009 NRL Grand Final win against the Parramatta Eels. This premiership title was later stripped due to salary cap breaches by the Melbourne Storm.

==== 2012 - 2019: Melbourne Storm ====
He re-joined the Melbourne Storm in 2012, and played his first game on 25 March 2012 against the Sydney Roosters, in which he scored a try. A successful return was exclaimed by scoring a hat-trick against New Zealand Warriors.

By being part of the 2012 NRL Grand Final winning team, Chambers joined Peter Ryan, Brad Thorn and Sonny Bill Williams in winning both NRL and Super Rugby titles (though he did not play in the Super Rugby final). Chambers won his in consecutive years after winning with the Queensland Reds in 2011.

In 2013, he played in Melbourne's World Club Challenge victory over Leeds.

Chambers was called into the Queensland team for the 2014 State of Origin series as 18th man for the first two games. However, with Brent Tate being injured in game two, it left vacant the wing position for Chambers to make his Origin debut at Suncorp Stadium in Game Three.

In the 2015 pre season, Chambers captained the Melbourne Storm at the NRL Auckland Nines. He was also selected for the Indigenous All Stars in the 2015 All Stars match at the Gold Coast.

After a great start to the 2015 NRL season, Chambers became the 800th Australian Kangaroo. He made his test debut in the centres against New Zealand Kiwis in the 2015 Anzac Test at Suncorp Stadium.

In the 2016 NRL season, Chambers was part of the Melbourne side which won the Minor Premiership and reached the grand final against Cronulla-Sutherland but were defeated 14–12 at ANZ Stadium with Chambers scoring a try in the second half of the match.

In the 2017 NRL season, Melbourne again won the Minor Premiership and reached the grand final against North Queensland where they won the match 34–6 at ANZ Stadium.

In the 2018 NRL season, Melbourne finished second on the table and reached the 2018 NRL Grand Final against the Sydney Roosters. Melbourne were defeated 21–6 in the final and Chambers was involved in an incident with Roosters player Latrell Mitchell during the match where Chambers was tackled into touch and then pushed into the advertising board by Mitchell. This was a culmination of a rivalry between the two players which had started earlier in the year during the 2018 State of Origin series.

In the 2019 NRL season, Melbourne won the Minor Premiership after a dominant season but were defeated by the Sydney Roosters at the Sydney Cricket Ground. This would be Chambers final game for Melbourne.

==== 2021: Cronulla-Sutherland ====
On 19 April 2021, Chambers signed a one-year deal to join Cronulla-Sutherland in the NRL.

In round 8 of the 2021 NRL season, he made his club debut for Cronulla-Sutherland against Melbourne at AAMI Park where Melbourne won 40–14.

In round 15 Chambers scored his first try for Cronulla against North Queensland. Cronulla-Sutherland would go on the win the game 26–24 in a tight finish.

On 10 August, Chambers was demoted from the Cronulla side by interim head coach Josh Hannay. Hannay was reportedly unhappy with Chambers on-field sledging where in consecutive weeks he sledged Manly's Dylan Walker and then against New Zealand Warriors player Kane Evans.

=== Rugby Union ===
==== 2010 - 2011: Queensland Reds ====
Chambers switched to rugby union from 2010 after signing a 2-year deal with the Queensland Reds to play in the Super 14. However, following a disappointing 2011 season - where he only started six of the Reds' 18 matches - Chambers was released by the club after missing a place in their thirty-man 2012 squad. He was named on the bench for the Reds Super 15 final victory over the Crusaders in 2011 – which featured fellow league-turned-union player Sonny Bill Williams on the opposing side – but did not play in the match.

==== 2011: Munster ====
Chambers signed for Pro12 side and former European Champions Munster in September 2011 on a short-term deal. He arrived to join up with Munster in October 2011. He played for Munster A against Connacht A on 21 October 2011. He made his full Munster debut against Aironi on 28 October 2011. He made his Heineken Cup debut for Munster against Northampton Saints on 12 November 2011. Chambers scored his first try for Munster exactly a week later, in their second Pool One game away to Castres Olympique. He was named in the Munster A team to play Ulster Ravens in the British and Irish Cup on 20 January 2012. This was announced to be Chambers last appearance for Munster, as he was returning to Australia to take up a contract with rugby league team Melbourne Storm. Munster A won the game 9–20, securing a spot in the semi-finals. In his four months with Munster, Chambers made 8 appearances for the senior Munster team, including 3 Heineken Cup caps, and scored 1 try. He also made 3 appearances for Munster A.

==== 2020: Suntory Sungoliath ====
Following the conclusion of the 2019 Melbourne Storm season, Chambers was honoured at the club's annual awards night as one of the departing players, confirming rumours that he would be leaving the NRL. Chambers would later be unveiled by Suntory Sungoliath, who also had former Queensland Reds Sam Talakai, Hendrik Tui & Samu Kerevi on their roster.

==== 2022: LA Giltinis ====
Chambers returned for a third stint playing rugby union, signed by 2021 Major League Rugby champions LA Giltinis.

== Honours ==
=== Melbourne Storm ===
- 2009 NRL Grand Final Winners
- 2012 NRL Grand Final Premiers
- 2013 World Club Challenge Winners
- 2017 NRL Grand Final Premiers
- 2018 World Club Challenge Winners

== NRL statistics ==
Year	Team	Games	Tries	Goals	Pts
2007	Melbourne Storm	5	1		4
2008	Melbourne Storm	10	3		12
2009	Melbourne Storm	27	12		48
2012	Melbourne Storm	18	13		52
2013	Melbourne Storm	25	12		48
2014	Melbourne Storm	22	11	1	46
2015	Melbourne Storm	25	10		40
2016	Melbourne Storm	17	3		12
2017	Melbourne Storm	23	7		28
2018	Melbourne Storm	19	4		16
2019	Melbourne Storm	24	6	1	26
2021	Cronulla-Sutherland Sharks	9	1		4
	Totals	226	85	2	344
