= Curtis Scott =

Australian former rugby league footballer

Personal information
- Born: 12 October 1997 (age 29) Sydney, New South Wales, Australia
- Height: 190 cm (6 ft 3 in)
- Weight: 95 kg (14 st 13 lb)

Playing information
- Position: Centre
Club
Years	Team	Pld	T	G	FG	P
2016–19	Melbourne Storm	49	18	0	0	72
2020–21	Canberra Raiders	23	3	0	0	12
	Total	72	21	0	0	84
Representative
Years	Team	Pld	T	G	FG	P
2019	Prime Minister's XIII	1	0	0	0	0
- Source: As of 4 June 2021

Curtis Scott (born 12 October 1997) is an Australian former professional rugby league footballer. He subsequently fought in one professional boxing match.

He played as a centre for the Canberra Raiders and previously for the Melbourne Storm and Canberra Raiders in the National Rugby League. He played in the Prime Minister's XIII in 2019.

== Early life ==
Scott was born in Sydney, New South Wales, Australia. He was educated at Endeavour Sports High School, Caringbah and represented 2015 Australian Schoolboys.

Curtis played his junior rugby league for the Bundeena Bushrangers and Cronulla-Caringbah JRLFC, before being signed by the Cronulla-Sutherland Sharks.

== Rugby league career ==
=== 2015 ===
In 2015, Scott captained the Cronulla-Sutherland Sharks' S. G. Ball Cup team to the premiership. In July 2015, he was named the Player of the Tournament, playing for New South Wales at the Australian Schoolboys carnival in Wollongong. Later on in that same year, he played for the Sharks' NYC team. In September 2015, he signed a three-year contract with the Melbourne Storm starting in 2016, beating 11 rival NRL clubs to his signature.

=== 2016 ===
In 2016, Scott played for Melbourne's Queensland Cup team, Sunshine Coast Falcons. In round 2 of the 2016 NRL season, he made his NRL debut for the Melbourne club against the Gold Coast Titans. Scott had his Melbourne Storm jersey (cap 170) presented to him by Melbourne Storm coach Craig Bellamy. In round 4 against the Cronulla-Sutherland Sharks, he broke his leg, ruling him out for the rest of the season.

=== 2017 ===
In October, Scott was part of the Melbourne Storm's premiership winning team against the North Queensland Cowboys in the 2017 NRL Grand Final.

=== 2018 ===
In round 11, Scott was sent off the field for punching Manly Warringah Sea Eagles player Dylan Walker, Scott being the first player in the last three years to be sent off. He played at centre for Melbourne in the 2018 NRL Grand Final which they lost 21-6 against the Sydney Roosters at ANZ Stadium.

=== 2019 ===
On 7 October, Scott earned his first representative jersey as he was named in the Australian side for the 2019 Rugby League World Cup 9s. Later that day, Scott was named at Centre for the U23 Australian squad. On 29 November, Scott signed a contract to join Canberra until the end of the 2023 season. Scott was released by Melbourne despite having two years remaining on his contract.

=== 2020 ===
Scott made his debut for Canberra against Gold Coast in round 1 of the 2020 NRL season which ended in a 24-6 victory. He missed large chunks of the 2020 season due to both indifferent form and injury, with his 2020 campaign ultimately ending when he hurt his right leg against Canterbury-Bankstown in round 16. After being cleared of a fracture, Scott ended up suffering an infection due to a plate in his leg from when he broke it back in 2016. The complications saw him miss the last four rounds of the competition and Canberra's finals campaign.

=== 2021 ===
On 23 August, Scott's playing contract with Canberra was terminated. The Raiders released a statement saying that "the board decided that Scott's prior behaviour and recent assault charge has brought the club into disrepute, and they could not ignore this and the responsibilities that his NRL playing contract entails".

The following day, it was also revealed that Scott had also been involved in a fist fight with teammate John Bateman at a private function in 2020. Scott injured his hand during the incident but the matter was not reported to the police and was dealt with privately.

== Boxing career ==
Curtis had a professional boxing match against Barry Hall who he knocked out within 90 seconds.

== Controversy ==
On 27 January 2020, Scott was arrested in Sydney's Moore Park after police were called to the area by security personnel. It was alleged that Scott had thrown a mobile phone at a passing motor vehicle and then had fallen asleep outside the Sydney Cricket Ground precinct. Police alleged that when they arrived at the scene, Scott pushed one officer away and punched the other officer in the face. These allegations were later shown to be false when bodycam video of the arrest was released. He was tasered and pepper-sprayed while still on the ground and then taken to the Sydney Police Centre in Surry Hills, where he was charged with six offences including two counts of assaulting an officer in the execution of duty, behaving in an offensive or indecent manner and remaining on trust lands after a request to leave. Scott was granted conditional bail.

The incident came only days after Scott had been interviewed by Fox Sports where he stated he signed for Canberra to "stay out of the Sydney rat-race and the Sydney fishbowl". Scott also told Fox Sports "I would have had too many distractions in Sydney and it just would have been a little bit too full on. It would have been easier for me to go out and end up … not in trouble, but just not take footy as serious as I did when I moved away and focused on it".

On 31 January 2020, Scott entered not guilty pleas to all six charges at Downing Centre Local Court. Scott's lawyer spoke on his behalf saying "We will defend this to the last breath, The police clearly misunderstood their powers. There is a significant concern about the manner in which police conducted themselves. We'll flesh it out in due course. We're saying Mr Scott is not guilty of all charges".

On 3 March 2020, Scott was cleared by the NRL to play in round one of the 2020 NRL season after they declared he would not be subject to the league's no-fault stand down policy. The NRL released a statement saying "Scott's charges carry a maximum five years imprisonment and do not qualify for an automatic no-fault stand down. Having considered the charges against Scott, the NRL has determined that he should not be prevented from playing whilst he responds to them," the statement said. "The NRL regards the charges as extremely serious and the Raiders have been advised Scott will face a significant penalty if found guilty of the charges".

On 9 September 2020, five allegations made against Scott were dropped by police after bodycam footage showed him asleep and not resisting arrest. Scott pleaded guilty however to two charges of offensive behaviour.

On 6 June 2021, it was revealed that Scott was alleged to have been involved in a fight at a Canberra nightclub. It was alleged that Scott punched one man several times, and assaulted another man who suffered a broken nose and concussion. Scott was reportedly forced to leave the club but police were not involved and he was not charged.

On 13 July 2021, Scott was given a backdated three-game ban and fined $15,000 for bringing the game into disrepute in relation to the fight.

On 5 January 2022, Scott was arrested when he was walking around a Sydney Golf course. He was charged with two counts of intentionally choke person with recklessness, two counts of assault occasioning actual bodily harm, stalk/intimidate intend fear physical etc harm (domestic), and three counts of common assault (DV). Sutherland Shire Police began investigating Scott in November 2020 following reports of domestic-related assaults alleged to have occurred in 2018. It is alleged the woman involved filed a complaint against Scott with both NSW Police and the NRL.

On 7 October 2022, Scott was found guilty of assault occasioning actual bodily harm, common assault and stalk or intimidate with the intention of causing fear or physical harm.

On 8 December 2025 it was reported that he had been charged by New South Wales police after allegedly fleeing the scene of a drunken car crash in Sydney. It is alleged that he had crashed into multiple trees at Bonnet Bay in Sydney on the evening of 15 June 2025 before fleeing the scene

== Honours ==
Club

- 2017 NRL Grand Final Winners
- 2017 Minor Premiership Winners
- 2018 World Club Challenge Winners

== Statistics ==
=== NRL ===
†	Denotes seasons in which Scott won an NRL Premiership

Season	Team	Matches	T	G	GK %	F/G	Pts	W	L	D	W-L %
2016	Melbourne Storm	2	0	-	-	0	0	1	1	0	50.00
2017†	Melbourne Storm	13	6	-	-	0	24	12	1	0	92.31
2018*	Melbourne Storm	24	2	-	-	0	8	6	3	0	66.67
2019	Melbourne Storm	9	3				12				
2020	Canberra Raiders	13	2				8				
2021	Canberra Raiders	10	1				4				
Career totals		72	21	0	0	0	84	19	6	0	79.17

* = Unfinished season
