= Tohu Harris =

New Zealand rugby league footballer

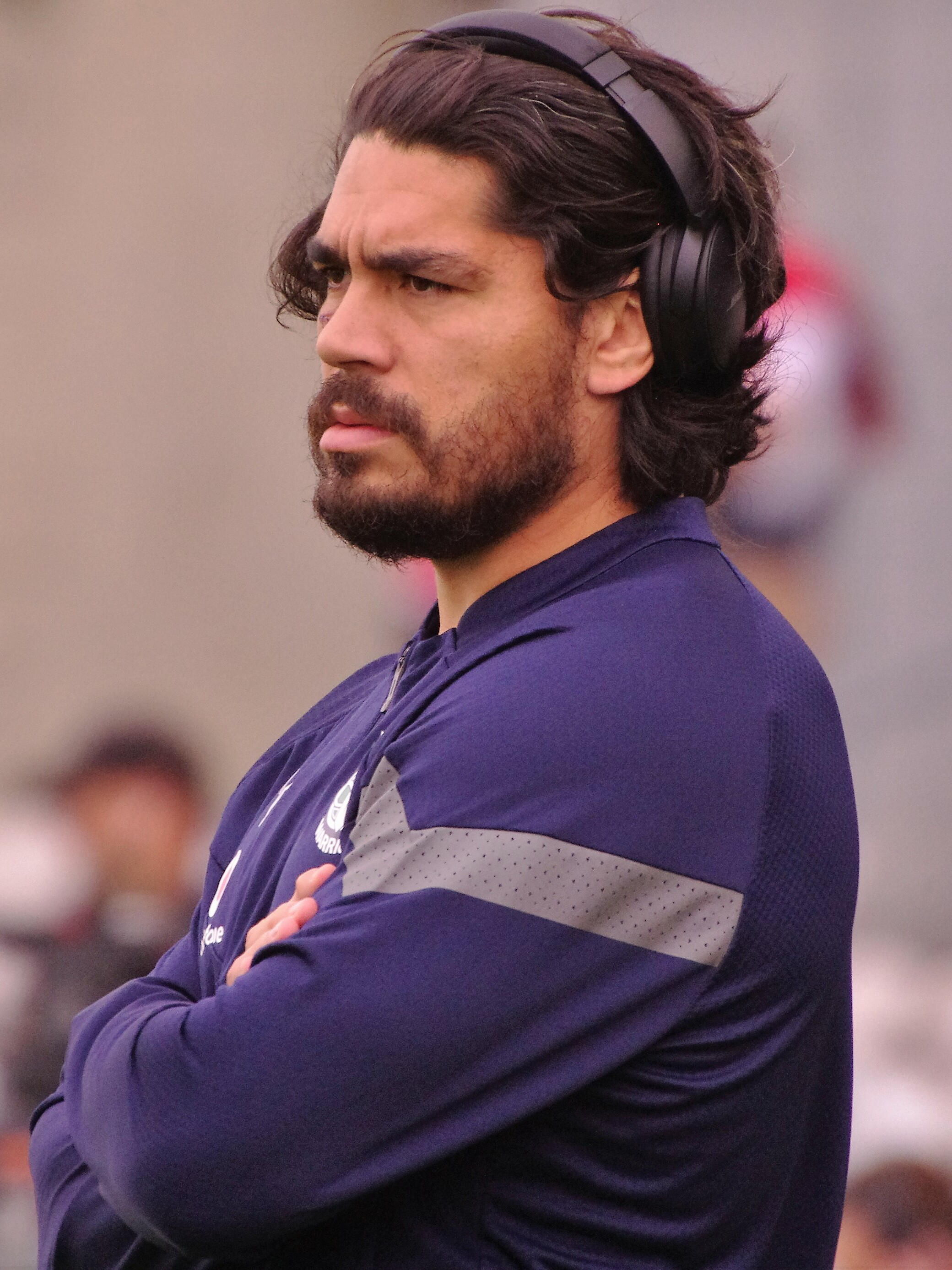

Personal information
- Born: 7 January 1992 (age 34) Hastings, New Zealand
- Height: 195 cm (6 ft 5 in)
- Weight: 112 kg (17 st 9 lb)

Playing information
- Position: Second-row, Lock, Prop
Club
Years	Team	Pld	T	G	FG	P
2013–17	Melbourne Storm	117	18	8	0	88
2018–24	New Zealand Warriors	117	12	0	0	48
	Total	234	30	8	0	136
Representative
Years	Team	Pld	T	G	FG	P
2013–16	New Zealand	16	2	0	0	8
2019	Māori All Stars	1	0	0	0	0
- Source: As of 29 June 2024

Tohu Harris (born 7 January 1992) is a New Zealand former professional rugby league footballer who played as a lock forward and captained the New Zealand Warriors in the National Rugby League (NRL).

He previously played for the Melbourne Storm with whom he won the 2017 NRL Grand Final and represented New Zealand and the New Zealand Māori at international level.

== Background ==
Harris was born in Hastings, New Zealand, and is of Māori descent.

Harris played his junior football for the Tamatea rugby union club and attended Hastings Boys' High School before being signed by the Melbourne Storm. In 2007, Harris played for the New Zealand U15's team. Harris played for the Storm's NYC team from 201.

== Playing career ==
=== 2013 ===
Harris played as a second-row and scored a try in the Melbourne Storm's 2013 World Club Challenge 18-14 win over the Leeds Rhinos. In Round 1 of the 2013 NRL season, Harris made his NRL debut for the Storm against the St. George Illawarra Dragons at second-row in the 30-10 win at AAMI Park. Harris was called up to the New Zealand national rugby league team squad as 18th man for the 2013 Anzac Test, replacing Jeremy Smith. Harris was promoted to the playing squad on the day of the test match when captain Simon Mannering was ruled out with a calf injury and made his debut for New Zealand on 19 April 2013 in the Kiwis 32-12 loss against Australia. In Round 13 against the Cronulla-Sutherland Sharks, Harris scored his first NRL career try in the Storm's 38-6 win at AAMI Park. Harris finished his debut year in the NRL with him playing in 25 matches and scoring 2 tries for the Melbourne Storm in the 2013 NRL season. On 9 October, Harris was dropped from the New Zealand side for the 2013 World Cup, which had been announced a day earlier. The decision was made following the controversial change of mind of Sonny Bill Williams, who had previously ruled himself out of the competition, to join the squad. Harris turned down a position to tour with the squad and play in a pre-tournament match against the Cook Islands in order to have minor surgery and rest before the 2014 NRL pre-season began. Harris also refused to respond to Williams after the latter tried to reach out to him after the much publicized U-turn.

=== 2014 ===
In February, Harris was included in the Storm's inaugural 2014 Auckland Nines squad. In Round 4 against the Canterbury-Bankstown Bulldogs, after Cameron Smith suffered a back spasm in the warm up, Harris was appointed the goal kicker; he kicked 2 goals in the 40-12 loss. In the 2014 Anzac Test, Harris was selected to play off the interchange bench but was shifted to start at five-eighth over debutant Isaac John. He scored a try in the Kiwis 30-18 loss. On 7 May, Harris re-signed with the Storm on a 3-year contract keeping him with the club till the end of the 2017 season. Harris played in all of the Storm's 25 matches, kicking 2 goals.

Harris played for New Zealand in the 2014 Four Nations. He came off the interchange bench in the Kiwis' 22-18 final win over Australia.

=== 2015 ===
On 3 May, Harris played for New Zealand in the 2015 Anzac Test, playing at second-row in the Kiwis' 26-12 win. In July, the Storm played the first ever NRL game at McLean Park in Napier, New Zealand, against the St George Illawarra Dragons. Harris designed the team's jersey for the occasion. The Storm won the match 22-4. Harris played in all of the Storm's 26 matches for the season, scoring 5 tries and kicking 3 goals. He was selected in the 23-man New Zealand squad to tour England, playing in all 3 matches of a 2-1 Baskerville Shield series loss. He scored 1 try, in the first test.

=== 2016 ===
In the pre-season, Harris played in the 2016 NRL Auckland Nines squad. On 6 May, Harris played at centre for New Zealand in the 2016 Anzac Test, as they lost 16-0. In Round 26 against the Cronulla-Sutherland Sharks, he played his 100th NRL match in a 26-6 win at AAMI Park. On 2 October, in the Storm’s 2016 NRL Grand Final against the Cronulla-Sutherland Sharks, Harris started at second-row in the 14-12 defeat.

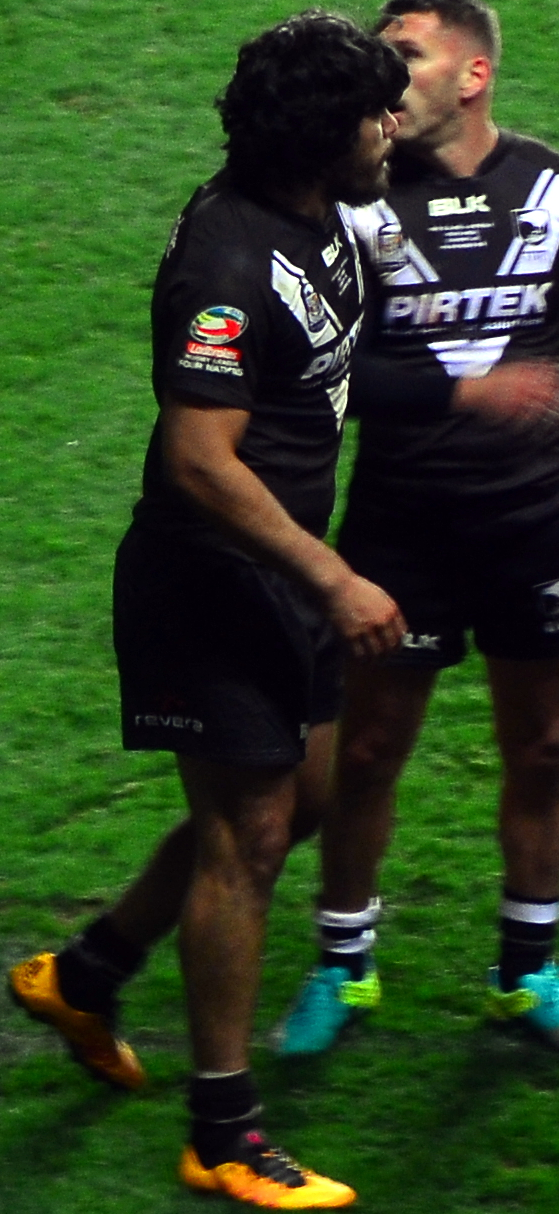
Harris playing for the Kiwis in 2016

Harris again played in all the Storm’s 27 matches for the season, scoring 8 tries and kicking 1 goal. In the 2016 Four Nations tournament, he played in 4 matches, including starting at five-eighth in the 34-8 final loss against Australia.

=== 2017 ===
On 31 January, it was announced that Harris signed a lucrative 4-year deal with the New Zealand Warriors, starting in 2018. Harris said about of the signing, "I’ve had a great time with the Storm and I owe them so much for what they’ve done for me. Coming home to play for the Warriors is a fantastic opportunity, though. The club has a great roster with so many Kiwi boys there and being back in New Zealand closer to family is a big attraction". Harris missed the first two months of the season after suffering a foot injury in the off-season. He made his first appearance of the season in Round 10 against the Gold Coast Titans, in a shock 38-36 upset loss at Suncorp Stadium. On 1 October, in the Storm’s 2017 NRL Grand Final against the North Queensland Cowboys, Harris started at second-row and had a blinder of a performance in the 34-6 victory. In his last year with the Melbourne Storm he played in 14 matches, scoring 3 tries and kicking 1 goal. After the grand final victory, Harris was ruled out of the 2017 Rugby League World Cup due to niggling shoulder and foot injuries.

=== 2018 ===
In Round 1 of the 2018 NRL season, Harris made his club debut for the New Zealand Warriors against the South Sydney Rabbitohs, starting at second-row in the 32-20 win at Perth Stadium.

=== 2019 & 2020 ===
In the 2019 NRL season, he made 13 appearances as the club missed out on the finals. In the 2020 NRL season, Harris played 20 games as the New Zealand Warriors again missed out on the finals.

=== 2021 ===
On 18 July, Harris was ruled out for the remainder of the 2021 NRL season after suffering an ACL injury in the club's loss against Penrith.

=== 2022 ===
Harris made a total of 15 appearances for the New Zealand Warriors in the 2022 NRL season as they finished 15th on the table.

=== 2023 ===
Harris played 23 matches for the New Zealand Warriors in the 2023 NRL season as the club finished 4th on the table and qualified for the finals. Harris played in all three finals games as the club reached the preliminary final stage before being knocked out by Brisbane. On 4 December, Harris re-signed with the club until the end of the 2025 season.

=== 2024 ===
On 16 July, it was announced that Harris would be ruled out for the rest of the 2024 NRL season after suffering a wrist injury. Harris was restricted to just 14 games for the season.

=== 2025 ===
On 9 January 2025, Harris announced his immediate retirement from the game due to a wrist injury. Harris had returned to pre season training but his injury had not healed as well as expected and was causing him pain, Harris said he was devastated to retire but his injury had prevented him from returning pain free.

== Statistics ==
Year	Team	Games	Tries	Goals	Pts
2013	Melbourne	25	2		8
2014	Melbourne	25		2	4
2015	Melbourne	26	5	3	26
2016	Melbourne	27	8	2	36
2017	Melbourne	14	3	1	14
2018	New Zealand Warriors	17	2		8
2019	New Zealand Warriors	13	2		8
2020	New Zealand Warriors	20	1		4
2021	New Zealand Warriors	15	3		12
2022	New Zealand Warriors	15	1		4
2023	New Zealand Warriors	23	3		12
2024	New Zealand Warriors	14			
	Totals	234	30	8	136

== Honours ==
- 2013 World Club Challenge Winners
- 2017 NRL Grand Final Winners
- 2020 NRL Second Rower of the Year

== Personal life ==
Harris married his wife Natalie in January 2014.
