= Felise Kaufusi =

Australia and Tonga international rugby league footballer

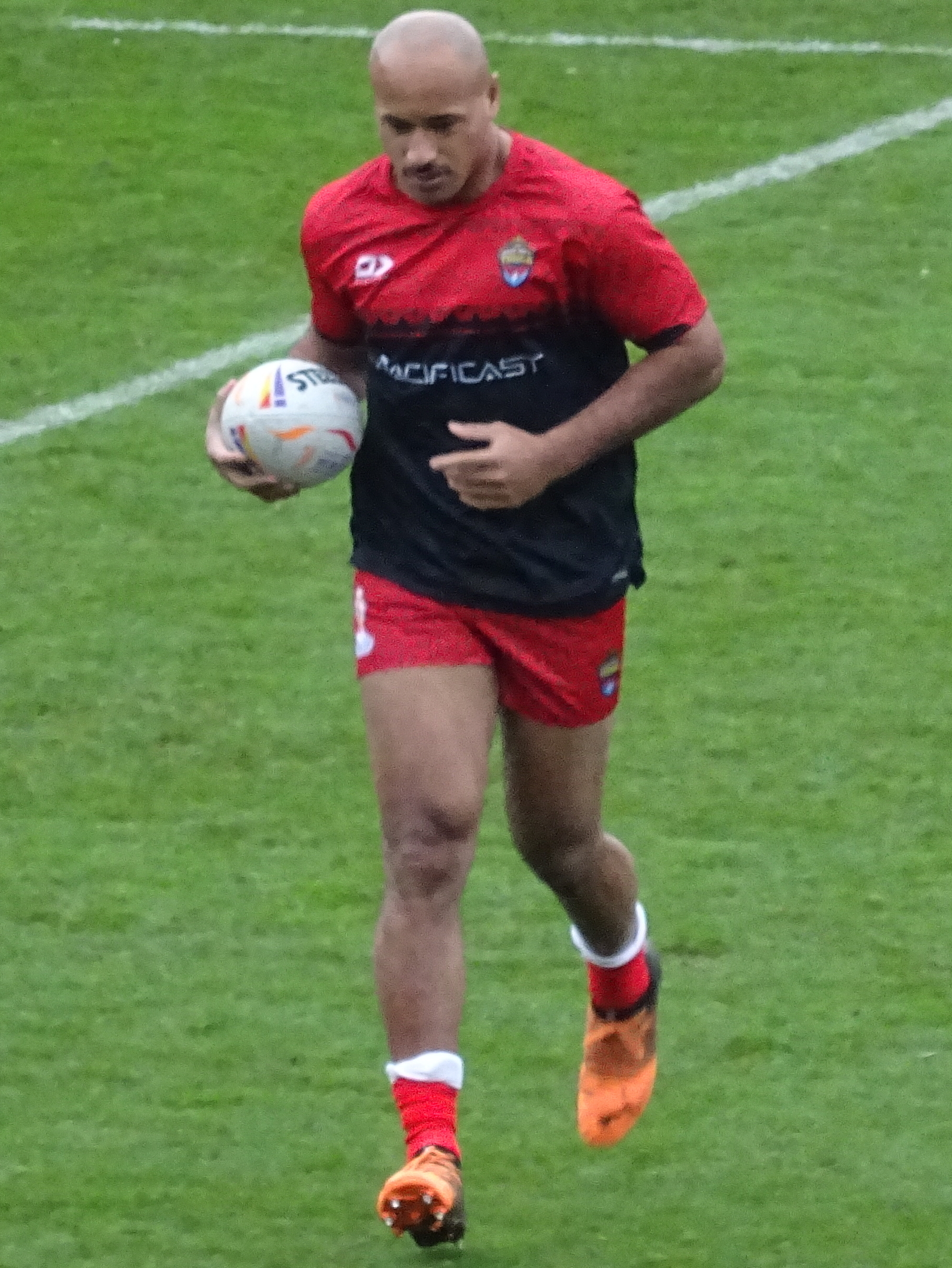

Personal information
- Born: 19 May 1992 (age 34) Auckland, New Zealand
- Height: 189 cm (6 ft 2 in)
- Weight: 109 kg (17 st 2 lb)

Playing information
- Position: Second-row, Prop
Club
Years	Team	Pld	T	G	FG	P
2015–22	Melbourne Storm	173	29	0	0	116
2023–	Dolphins	69	4	0	0	16
	Total	242	33	0	0	132
Representative
Years	Team	Pld	T	G	FG	P
2014	Queensland Residents	1	0	0	0	0
2015–25	Tonga	15	1	0	0	4
2017–18	Australia	4	1	0	0	4
2018–24	Queensland	17	2	0	0	8
- Source: As of 14 August 2026
- Education: Shalom Catholic College, Bundaberg
- Relatives: Antonio Kaufusi (brother); Patrick Kaufusi (brother)

Felise Kaufusi (born 19 May 1992) is a professional rugby league footballer who plays as a second-row or prop forward for the Dolphins in the National Rugby League (NRL), and Tonga and Australia at international level.

He previously played for the Melbourne Storm and won the 2017 NRL Grand Final and 2020 NRL Grand Finals with them. He represented Australia at international level and the Queensland Maroons in State of Origin. He has also played as a lock in his career.

== Early life ==
Kaufusi was born in Auckland, New Zealand, and is of Tongan descent. He is the younger brother of Antonio and older brother of Patrick.

At age seven, Kaufusi moved to Australia and was educated at Shalom Catholic College, Bundaberg. He played junior football for the Bundaberg Brothers before being signed by the North Queensland Cowboys.

== Playing career ==
=== Early career ===
From 2010 to 2012, Kaufusi played for the North Queensland Cowboys' NYC team, including their 2011 NYC Grand Final 30-31 golden point extra time loss to the New Zealand Warriors. In 2013, he moved on to the Cowboys' Queensland Cup team, Northern Pride RLFC. The following year, Kaufusi played for the Queensland Residents against the New South Wales Residents.

=== Melbourne Storm (2015-2022) ===
In Round 1 of the 2015 NRL season, Kaufusi made his NRL debut for the Melbourne Storm against the St. George Illawarra Dragons, playing off the interchange bench in the 12-4 win at Jubilee Oval. In Round 4 against the North Queensland Cowboys, Kaufusi scored his first NRL career try in the Storm’s 18-17 loss at 1300SMILES Stadium. On 2 May 2015, he played for Tonga against Samoa in the Polynesian Cup. On 2 July 2015, Kaufusi re-signed with the Storm on a two-year contract.

On 7 May 2016, Kaufusi played for Tonga against Samoa in the 2016 Polynesian Cup. On 6 July, he was named as 18th man for Queensland in Game 3 of the 2016 State of Origin series. Kaufusi was named as 18th man for the Storm in their 2016 NRL Grand Final clash against the Cronulla-Sutherland Sharks but didn’t play in the 12-14 loss. Kaufusi finished the 2016 NRL season having played in twenty-one matches and scoring four tries for the Storm.

On 21 April 2017, Kaufusi re-signed with the Storm to the end of the 2019 season. On 6 May 2017, he played for Tonga against Fiji in the 2017 Pacific Test, where he started at second-row in the 26-24 win at Campbelltown Stadium. During the season, Kaufusi took over the void second-row position from the departed Kevin Proctor and was instrumental for the Storm to their run leading up to the Finals series when they won the Minor Premiership trophy. In the Storm’s 2017 NRL Grand Final 34-6 victory against the North Queensland Cowboys, Kaufusi started at second-row and scored a try. Kaufusi finished the 2017 NRL season having played in all of the Storm’s twenty-seven matches and scored nine tries. Two days after the Grand Final win, Kaufusi was selected in the Kangaroos squad for the 2017 Rugby League World Cup. On 3 November 2017, Kaufusi made his test debut for Australia against France, where he played off the interchange bench in the 52-6 win at Canberra Stadium.

In Round 1 of 2018, Kaufusi suffered a hamstring injury and was sidelined for three weeks. In May, he signed a two-year extension to remain with the Melbourne Storm.

Kaufusi made his debut for Queensland in Game 1 of the 2018 State of Origin series, starting at second-row in all three games. He then featured in the Melbourne Storm's grand final loss to the Sydney Roosters. Kaufusi played in twenty-one games for the Storm in 2018, scoring five tries. He also played for Australia in the end of season tests vs New Zealand and Tonga.

Kaufusi played twenty-five games for Melbourne in the 2019 NRL season. Although Melbourne finished as minor premiers, they were defeated by the Sydney Roosters in the preliminary final. In the 2020 NRL season, Kaufusi played twenty-one games for Melbourne including the club's 2020 NRL Grand Final victory over Penrith. In round 2 of the 2021 NRL season against Parramatta, Kaufusi was placed on report suspended for three games after tackling Parramatta player Ryan Matterson, who subsequently missed the following five matches. In round 10, Kaufusi was placed on report for tripping a St. George Illawarra but later beat the charge, and was then selected for Queensland to play in the 2021 State of Origin series.

Kaufusi was selected by Queensland for game one of the 2022 State of Origin series. In game two, he scored a try but was later sin binned for a professional foul during Queensland's 12-44 loss against New South Wales. Kaufusi played twenty-one games for Melbourne in the 2022 NRL season including the club's elimination final loss to Canberra.

=== Dolphins (2023-present) ===
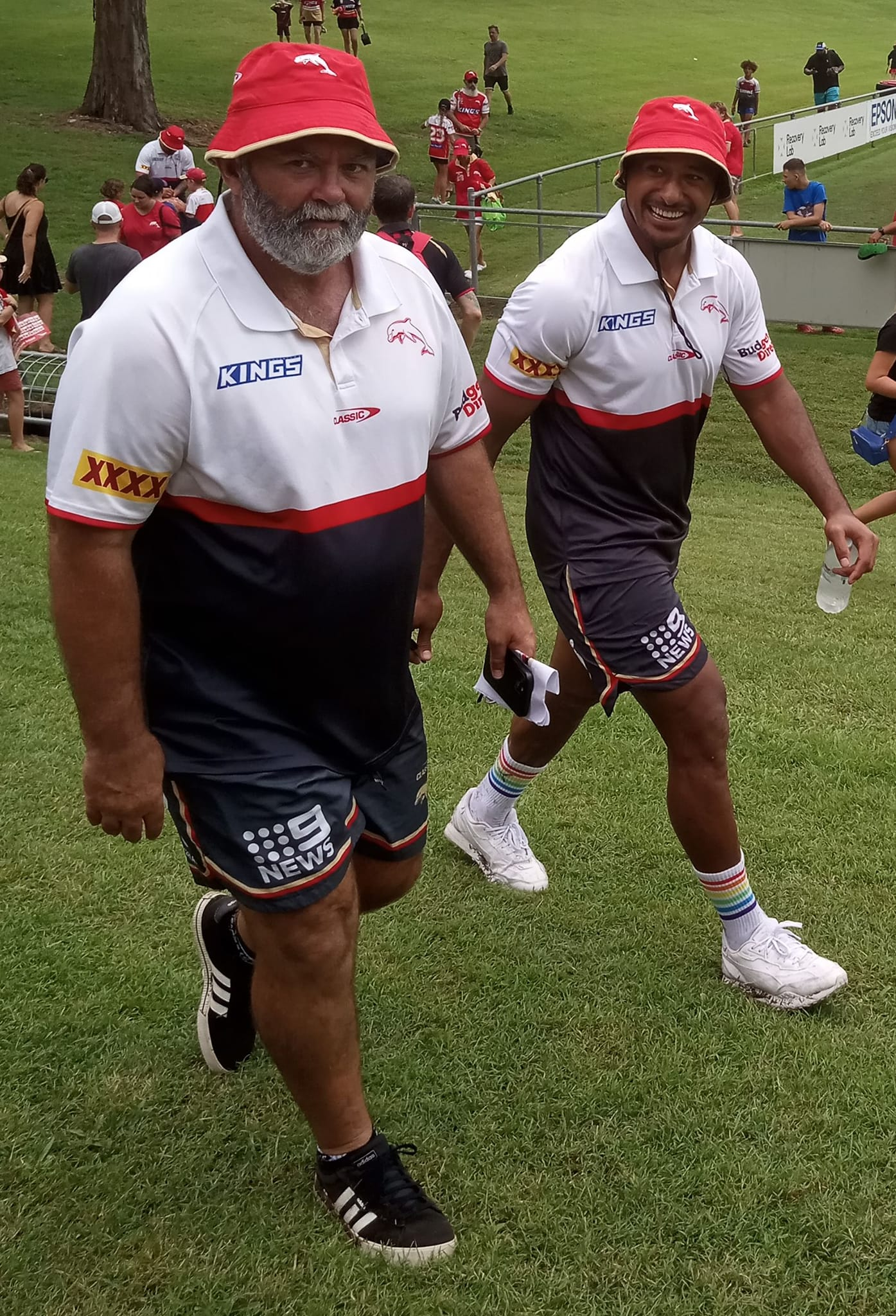
Kaufusi on right in 2024

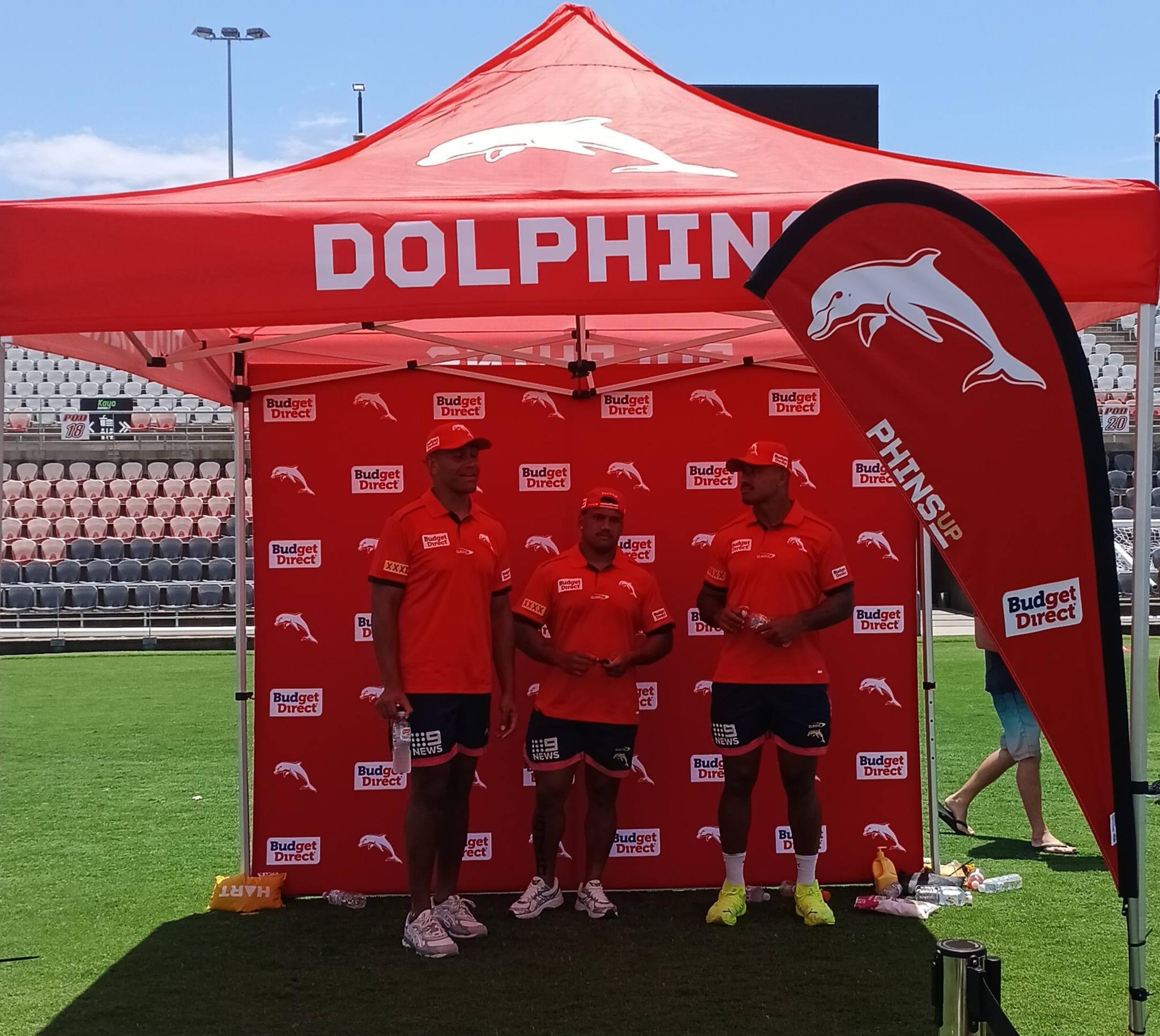
Kaufusi on right in 2026

In round 1 of the 2023 NRL season, Kaufusi made his club debut for the Dolphins in their inaugural game in the national competition, defeating the Sydney Roosters 28-18 at Suncorp Stadium. After a late tackle in round 3 against the Newcastle Knights at McDonald Jones Stadium, Kaufusi was suspended on a dangerous contact charge for the next four games (rounds 4-7). In round 10 against the Cronulla Sutherland Sharks at Suncorp Stadium, Kaufusi captained the Dolphins in their 36-16 victory at Suncorp Stadium. In the second minute of round 12 against the Melbourne Storm at Suncorp Stadium, Kaufusi was sin-binned for a grade-two careless high tackle and suspended for the next three rounds.

Internationally, Kaufusi was selected to represent Tonga in a three-Test series against England that commenced at St Helens' Totally Wicked Stadium on 22 October 2023.

In game 1 of the 2024 State of Origin series, Kaufusi became the first 18th man to be activated in a State of Origin match due to Reece Walsh being fouled out of the game following a high tackle by Joseph Suaalii which he was sent from the field for. Kaufusi played 18 games for the Dolphins in the 2024 NRL season as the club finished 10th on the table.

On 28 August 2025, the Dolphins announced that Kaufusi had re-signed with the team until the end of 2027. Kaufusi played 16 matches for the Dolphins in the 2025 NRL season as the club narrowly missed out on the finals finishing 9th.

In 2026 Kaufusi played 19 NRL games for the Dolphins but was not selected during the clubs first finals campaign. However he did feature in the Redcliffe Dolphins successful run in the Queensland cup, winning both the Grand Final and the NRL State Championship

== Honours ==
=== Club ===
- 2017 NRL Grand Final – Winners
- 2018 World Club Challenge – Winners
- 2020 NRL Grand Final – Winners
- 2026 Queensland Cup - Winners
- 2026 NRL State Championship - Winners

=== Individual ===
Melbourne Storm

- 2017 – Most Improved Player of the Year

== Statistics ==
Year	Team	Games	Tries	Pts
2015	Melbourne Storm	17	2	8
2016	Melbourne Storm	21	4	16
2017	Melbourne Storm	27	9	36
2018	Melbourne Storm	21	5	20
2019	Melbourne Storm	25	1	4
2020	Melbourne Storm	21	2	8
2021	Melbourne Storm	20	3	12
2022	Melbourne Storm	21	3	12
2023	Dolphins	16		
2024	Dolphins	18	2	8
2025	Dolphins	16	1	4
2026	Dolphins	20	1	4
2027	Dolphins			
	Totals	242	33	132
