= 2021 Melbourne Storm season =

NRL rugby league season

- NRL Rank: 1st (Minor Premier)
- Play-off result: Preliminary Final Loss
- 2021 record: Wins: 21; draws: 0; losses: 3
- Points scored: For: 815; against: 316

Team information
- CEO: Ashley Tucker (interim); Justin Rodski
- Coach: Craig Bellamy
- Captain: Jesse Bromwich (21 matches) Dale Finucane (17 matches) (Note: Bromwich and Finucane were co-captains in the 15 matches they played in together.)
- Stadium: AAMI Park - 30,050 (5 matches); Cbus Super Stadium - 27,400 (1 match); Suncorp Stadium - 52,500 (3 matches); Sunshine Coast Stadium - 12,000 (3 matches)
- Avg. attendance: 14,285 (Note: Home matches played at AAMI Park only)
- High attendance: 20,320 (Round 7)

Top scorers
- Tries: Josh Addo-Carr (23)
- Goals: Nicho Hynes (58)
- Points: Ryan Papenhuyzen (157)
← 2020	List of seasons	2022 →

The 2021 Melbourne Storm season was the 24th in the club's history competing in the 2021 NRL season. The team is coached by Craig Bellamy, coaching the club for his 19th consecutive season. On 19 February 2021, the Melbourne Storm announced that Jesse Bromwich and Dale Finucane succeeded Cameron Smith, as co-captains of the club.

The season was again affected by the COVID-19 pandemic in Australia, with the club forced to relocate to Queensland for much of the season.

Melbourne claimed the J. J. Giltinan Shield for the fifth time as minor premiers, setting a number of club records (21 wins; 815 points). Melbourne tied the league record for most consecutive wins with 19 victories between rounds 4-23.

In a rematch of the 2020 NRL Grand Final, second placed Penrith Panthers knocked Melbourne out of the 2021 NRL finals in the preliminary final, ending hopes of back-to-back premierships.

== Season summary ==
- World Club Challenge – On 20 November 2020, it was announced that the World Club challenge (which the Storm would be competing in) would be postponed until later in 2021, owing to the push back of seasons due to COVID-19 and the ongoing pandemic itself preventing overseas travel. Articles later in 2021 confirmed that it has been cancelled and the 2022 challenge is also under a cloud.
- 12 February – Seven Melbourne players (Josh Addo-Carr, Nelson Asofa-Solomona, Jesse Bromwich, Kenneath Bromwich, Jahrome Hughes, Brandon Smith and Reimis Smith) are forced to withdraw from the 2021 All Stars match due to a Victoria COVID-19 border closure.
- 18 February – Due to the possibility of travel restrictions, Newcastle Knights refuse to travel to Melbourne for their scheduled pre-season trial game at Casey Fields, with the match relocated to Albury.
- 19 February – The club announces that Jesse Bromwich and Dale Finucane have succeeded Cameron Smith, as co-captains of the club.
- 10 March – Cameron Smith officially announces his retirement from the game. This was done at a ceremony unveiling statues of himself and also Billy Slater at AAMI Park.
- Round 1 – The Storm open the 2021 NRL season with a win against South Sydney Rabbitohs at AAMI Park. This continued the streak of not having lost a Round 1 game since the 2001 NRL season. Tyson Smoothy also made his NRL debut.
- Round 4 – After two straight losses, the Storm demolish the Broncos 40–6. Ryan Papenhuyzen scored four tries in 11 minutes to equal the club record for the most scored in a single game, he also scored 5 goals and with a combined points total of 26, put him in second place for club record for the most points scored in a game. Christian Welch played his 100th NRL game and Trent Loiero made his debut.
- Round 7 – Melbourne retain the Michael Moore Trophy winning 42–20 against the Warriors. George Jennings is substituted after 12 minutes due to concussion resulting from foul play, with Chris Lewis activated as a reserve player under the new NRL 18th man rule.
- Round 9 – Josh Addo-Carr scores a club record six tries in a game, becoming the first player in 71 years to score 6 tries in a first grade game in Australia.
- Round 10 – Melbourne host St George Illawarra at Suncorp Stadium during day three of the 2021 NRL Magic Round. Dragons centre Tyrell Fuimaono is sent off for a high tackle on Ryan Papenhuyzen who is left heavily concussed, with Dean Ieremia coming on as 18th man.
- 28 May – Storm announce that their Round 13 match had been moved to Sunshine Coast Stadium due to a COVID-19 outbreak in Melbourne. The club had been staying for a mid-season camp at their 2020 home away from home since just before Round 10.
- Round 13 – Reimis Smith is the first player sent to the sin bin from the Storm for the season, after a high tackle on Titans' Jaimin Jolliffe.
- 8 June – Storm announce that their Round 15 match has also been moved to Sunshine Coast Stadium.
- 10 June – Storm sign former Parramatta forward Tepai Moeroa from the NSW Waratahs, where he had been playing rugby union since 2020.
- 25 June – Sydney Roosters move their Round 16 home game against Melbourne to McDonald Jones Stadium, Newcastle, due to a COVID-19 outbreak in Sydney.
- 29 June – After 46 days away, Storm return home to Melbourne after checking out of their extended Sunshine Coast stay.
- Round 16 – Melbourne score 40+ points for the 10th time for the season, the first team to achieve that feat in Australian first grade rugby league.
- 14 July – Melbourne announce that they have broken the membership record, signing up over 27,000 members.
- 15 July – A COVID-19 outbreak in Victoria, saw the club forced to again relocate to Queensland, with the venue for the Round 18 game against Newcastle changed to CBus Super Stadium.
- Round 18 – Melbourne Storm score their 14th consecutive win with a 48 - 4 thrashing of the Newcastle Knights. The win was notable because they broke an 86 year old Rugby League record in the process, surpassing the Sydney Roosters’ 1935 record for the most points scored after 17 games in one year. At the end of the game the Storm points for was 632 the 1935 Roosters was 614.
- 23 July – The NRL confirm that Melbourne's Round 20 (home) and 21 (away) games will be played at Suncorp Stadium with the entire competition based in Queensland.
- Round 19 – The Storm defeat the Cowboys in a close game by four points to win their 15th consecutive game and equal the club record for the most consecutive wins. Josh Addo-Carr also scored his 100th NRL try.
- 25 July – Club co-captain Dale Finucane announces that he will leave the Melbourne Storm at seasons end and join Cronulla Sharks in 2022 on a 4-year contract.
- 26 July – Nicho Hynes is nominated as the club representative for the NRL's Ken Stephen Medal for his work with young Indigenous children and as an ambassador for the Starlight Foundation.
- 27 July – Head coach Craig Bellamy agrees to a new long-term deal with the club to stay as coach in 2022, with a flexible role contract in place until the end of the 2026 NRL season.
- 30 July – Fullback Ryan Papenhuyzen signs a new contract to stay with Melbourne until the end of the 2025 NRL season.
- Round 20 – Melbourne defeat the Penrith Panthers to score their 16th straight win and set a new club record for the most consecutive wins. Ryan Papenhuyzen also played his 50th Game. The other notable aspect of the win was that at the end of the game the Storm points differential was 465 points, the largest in Australian rugby league history.
- 3 August – Reports surface that Melbourne Storm Chairman Matt Tripp put forward a proposal to the NRL to shift the 2021 NRL Grand Final to the MCG for a $10m fee.
- 6 August – Second-row forward Felise Kaufusi extends his contract with the club until the end of the 2022 season.
- Round 21 – Melbourne speed past 700 points scored in the regular season for only the second time in club history, passing the previous best of 704 from 2001. Tepai Moeroa makes his Storm debut, his first NRL game since playing against Melbourne in the 2019 NRL finals.
- Round 22 – Melbourne Storm score their 18th consecutive win, 26–16 over Canberra and in doing so set a new club record for the most points scored in a season (surpassing 2004's 733 points in 26 games including finals).
- 17 August – Jordan Grant signs a contract to join the top-30 squad from 2022, while Isaac Lumelume signs on to extend his contract with the club. Melbourne also announce the signing of Bronson Garlick on a development contact.
- Round 23 – With their 19th straight victory, Melbourne equal the record of the 1975 Easts team for the longest winning streak Australian rugby league history. Captain Jesse Bromwich wins his 200th first grade game in his 269th appearance, to become the fastest person to win 200 games. In his first Storm game since 2019, Marion Seve scores a try as Melbourne score 30+ points for the 14th time for the 2021 season. In addition, Josh Addo-Carr's two tries increased his season total to 23, equaling the club record for most tries scored in a season.
- Round 24 – Parramatta Eels inflict Melbourne's first loss since March, ending the 19-game winning streak. The loss is Melbourne's first in Queensland since 2017, a stretch of 29 matches.
- 30 August – Christian Welch, Jahrome Hughes, Brandon Smith and Nicho Hynes are nominated for the RLPA's Players' Champion Award for the 2021 season.
- Round 25 – Melbourne secure their fifth J. J. Giltinan Shield, defeating Cronulla-Sutherland Sharks to take the minor premiership on points difference ahead of Penrith. It is the eighth time the club has finished atop the NRL ladder. Daniel Atkinson makes his NRL debut, after only two Queensland Cup games; while captain Dale Finucane plays his 150th game for the club.
- Finals Week 1 – Melbourne Storm defeat the Manly Sea Eagles to earn a bye and progress directly to the Week 3 - Preliminary finals. Ryan Papenhuyzen scores 24 points including the clubs first 2-point field goal.
- Finals Week 3 – In a rematch of the 2020 NRL Grand Final, Penrith defeat Melbourne 10–6 at Suncorp Stadium, the club's first loss in a finals game at the venue. Early injuries to Christian Welch and Brandon Smith proving costly in what was Dale Finucane, Josh Addo-Carr and Nicho Hynes' last game for the club. The defeat ending hopes of a back-to-back premiership.
- 27 September – Craig Bellamy wins his sixth Coach of the Year award at the 2021 Dally M Awards. Justin Olam (centre) and Brandon Smith (hooker) both make the Dally M Team of the Year for the first time.
- 28 September – It is confirmed by CEO Justin Rodski that the NRL Integrity Unit is investigating Cameron Munster, Brandon Smith and Chris Lewis after video emerged on social media of the trio partying following the club's elimination from the NRL finals.
- 5 October – The NRL issues breach notices to Cameron Munster, Brandon Smith and Chris Lewis following the NRL Integrity Unit investigation. All three players are alleged to have brought the game into disrepute and are sanctioned with one-match suspensions and varying fines. The club also enforces additional penalties including suspended fines, removal from leadership groups, and additional behavioral measures.
- 20 December – The NRL formally stands down Tui Kamikamica under the league's no-fault stand-down policy, due to pending assault occasioning bodily harm charges against the Fijian. Kamikamica was earlier stood down by the club when news of the charges emerged in November, but was allowed to return to training.

=== Milestone games ===
Round	Player	Milestone
Round 1	Reimis Smith	Storm debut
Round 1	George Jennings	Storm debut
Round 1	Tyson Smoothy	NRL debut
Round 2	Jesse Bromwich	250th Game
Round 4	Christian Welch	100th Game
Round 4	Trent Loiero	NRL debut
Round 8	Dean Ieremia	NRL debut
Round 12	Justin Olam	50th Game
Round 18	George Jennings	50th Game
Round 18	Tui Kamikamica	50th Game
Round 18	Jordan Grant	NRL debut
Round 19	Josh Addo-Carr	100th NRL try
Round 20	Ryan Papenhuyzen	50th Game
Round 21	Tepai Moeroa	Storm debut
Round 24	Felise Kaufusi	150th Game
Round 25	Daniel Atkinson	NRL debut
Qualifying Final	Cameron Munster	150th Game

== Fixtures ==
=== Pre-season ===
Date	Round	Opponent	Venue	Result	Mel.	Opp.	Source
20 February	Trial	New Zealand Warriors	Dolphin Stadium, Redcliffe	Match cancelled			
27 February	Trial	Newcastle Knights	Albury Sports Ground, Albury	Win	30	10	

=== Regular season ===
- (GP) - Golden Point extra time
- (pen) - Penalty try

Date	Round	Opponent	Home/Away	Venue	Result	Mel.	Opp.	Tries	Goals	Field goals	Report
11 March	1	South Sydney Rabbitohs	Home	AAMI Park, Melbourne	Won	26	18	R Papenhuyzen (2), C Munster, J Olam	R Papenhuyzen 5/6		
18 March	2	Parramatta Eels	Away	Bankwest Stadium, Parramatta	Lost	12	16	R Smith, J Olam	R Papenhuyzen 2/2		
25 March	3	Penrith Panthers	Away	BlueBet Stadium, Penrith	Lost	10	12	B Smith, J Addo-Carr	C Munster 1/2		
2 April	4	Brisbane Broncos	Home	AAMI Park, Melbourne	Won	40	6	R Papenhuyzen (4), G Jennings (2), C Munster	R Papenhuyzen 5/7, J Addo-Carr 1/1		
10 April	5	Canterbury Bulldogs	Away	Stadium Australia, Sydney	Won	52	18	F Kaufusi, J Hughes, C Welch, T Kamikamica, G Jennings, R Papenhuyzen, J Olam, J Addo-Carr, N Hynes	R Papenhuyzen 8/9		
16 April	6	Sydney Roosters	Home	AAMI Park, Melbourne	Won	20	4	J Hughes, R Papenhuyzen, H Grant	C Munster 0/1, R Papenhuyzen 4/5		
25 April	7	New Zealand Warriors	Home	AAMI Park, Melbourne	Won	42	20	R Smith (2), J Addo-Carr (2), G Jennings, F Kaufusi, N Hynes, J Olam	C Munster 5/8		
30 April	8	Cronulla Sutherland Sharks	Home	AAMI Park, Melbourne	Won	40	14	R Smith (3), J Addo-Carr, T Eisenhuth, T Kamikamica, J Hughes, B Smith	C Munster 4/8, N Hynes 0/1		
6 May	9	South Sydney Rabbitohs	Away	Stadium Australia, Sydney	Won	50	0	J Addo-Carr (6), G Jennings (2), J Hughes, B Smith	C Munster 5/10		
16 May	10	St George-Illawarra Dragons	Home	Suncorp Stadium, Brisbane	Won	44	18	J Addo-Carr (3), K Bromwich, D Ieremia, N Asofa-Solomona, J Hughes, J Olam, G Jennings	T Smoothy 3/5, N Hynes 1/4		
22 May	11	Canberra Raiders	Away	GIO Stadium, Canberra	Won	34	10	N Asofa-Solomona (2), C Lewis, R Smith, T Eisenhuth, T Loiero	N Hynes 5/6		
27 May	12	Brisbane Broncos	Away	Suncorp Stadium, Brisbane	Won	40	12	B Smith (2), T Kamikamica, J Addo-Carr, G Jennings, C Johns, N Hynes	N Hynes 6/7		
5 June	13	Gold Coast Titans	Home	Sunshine Coast Stadium, Sunshine Coast (Note: Match originally scheduled for AAMI Park, Melbourne)	Won	20	14	R Smith, B Smith, T Loiero, G Jennings	N Hynes 2/4		
13 June	14	New Zealand Warriors	Away	Central Coast Stadium, Gosford	Won	42	16	D Ieremia, B Smith, J Addo-Carr, J Hughes, J Olam, H Grant, T Eisenhuth	N Hynes 7/8		
19 June	15	Wests Tigers	Home	Sunshine Coast Stadium, Sunshine Coast	Won	66	16	R Smith (2), J Hughes (2), B Smith, N Hynes, C Munster, D Finucane, N Asofa-Solomona, F Kaufusi, T Eisenhuth, H Grant	N Hynes 9/12		
1 July	16	Sydney Roosters	Away	McDonald Jones Stadium, Newcastle (Note: Match originally scheduled for SCG, Sydney)	Won	46	0	J Addo-Carr (3), N Hynes, D Finucane, K Bromwich, C Munster, B Smith	N Hynes 7/9		
10 July	17	Bye									
17 July	18	Newcastle Knights	Home	Cbus Super Stadium, Gold Coast	Won	48	4	J Olam (2), G Jennings (2), C Munster, N Hynes, J Hughes, R Smith	N Hynes 8/8		
23 July	19	North Queensland Cowboys	Away	Queensland Country Bank Stadium, Townsville	Won	20	16	J Addo-Carr (2), J Olam, R Smith	N Hynes 2/4		
1 August (Note: Match originally scheduled for 31 July, but postponed due to a lockdown in South East Queensland)	20	Penrith Panthers	Home	Suncorp Stadium, Brisbane	Won	37	10	D Ieremia (3), R Smith, J Bromwich, H Grant,	C Munster 1/1, N Hynes 1/2, R Papenhuyzen 4/4	R Papenhuyzen 1/1	
7 August	21	Manly Sea Eagles	Away	Suncorp Stadium, Brisbane (Note: Match originally scheduled for 4 Pines Park, Sydney)	Won	28	18	J Olam (2), K Bromwich, C Munster	R Papenhuyzen 4/4, N Hynes 2/3		
12 August	22	Canberra Raiders	Home	Sunshine Coast Stadium, Sunshine Coast	Won	26	16	B Smith, D Ieremia, C Lewis	N Hynes 4/4, R Papenhuyzen 3/3		
19 August	23	Gold Coast Titans	Away	Cbus Super Stadium, Gold Coast	Won	34	20	J Addo-Carr (2), M Seve, H Grant, C Munster, N Hynes	R Papenhuyzen 5/6		
28 August	24	Parramatta Eels	Home	Suncorp Stadium, Brisbane	Lost	10	22	R Smith, I Lumelume	R Papenhuyzen 1/2		
3 September	25	Cronulla Sutherland Sharks	Away	Cbus Super Stadium, Gold Coast (Note: Match originally scheduled for Netstrata Jubilee Stadium, Sydney)	Won	28	16	R Papenhuyzen (3), B Smith, M Seve	N Hynes 4/6		

=== Finals ===
Date	Round	Opponent	Venue	Result	Mel.	Opp.	Tries	Goals	Field Goals	Report
10 September	Week 1 - Qualifying Final	Manly Sea Eagles	Sunshine Coast Stadium, Sunshine Coast	Won	40	12	R Papenhuyzen (2), I Lumelume, K Bromwich, C Welch, J Olam	R Papenhuyzen 7/8	R Papenhuyzen 1/1 (2pt)	
25 September	Week 3 - Preliminary Final	Penrith Panthers	Suncorp Stadium, Brisbane	Lost	6	10	R Papenhuyzen	R Papenhuzen 1/1		

== Ladder ==
Pos	Team	Pld	W	D	L	B	PF	PA	PD	Pts	
1	Melbourne Storm (M)	24	21	0	3	1	815	316	+499	44	Advance to finals series
2	Penrith Panthers (P)	24	21	0	3	1	676	286	+390	44	Advance to finals series
3	South Sydney Rabbitohs	24	20	0	4	1	775	453	+322	42	Advance to finals series
4	Manly-Warringah Sea Eagles	24	16	0	8	1	744	492	+252	34	Advance to finals series
5	Sydney Roosters	24	16	0	8	1	630	489	+141	34	Advance to finals series
6	Parramatta Eels	24	15	0	9	1	566	457	+109	32	Advance to finals series
7	Newcastle Knights	24	12	0	12	1	428	571	−143	26	Advance to finals series
8	Gold Coast Titans	24	10	0	14	1	580	583	−3	22	Advance to finals series
9	Cronulla-Sutherland Sharks	24	10	0	14	1	520	556	−36	22	
10	Canberra Raiders	24	10	0	14	1	481	578	−97	22	
11	St. George Illawarra Dragons	24	8	0	16	1	474	616	−142	18	
12	New Zealand Warriors	24	8	0	16	1	453	624	−171	18	
13	Wests Tigers	24	8	0	16	1	500	714	−214	18	
14	Brisbane Broncos	24	7	0	17	1	446	695	−249	16	
15	North Queensland Cowboys	24	7	0	17	1	460	748	−288	16	
16	Canterbury-Bankstown Bulldogs (W)	24	3	0	21	1	340	710	−370	8	

Updated to match(es) played on 5 September 2021. Source: 2021 NRL Ladder
(M) Minor premiers; (P) Premiers; (W) Wooden spoon

== Coaching staff ==
- Craig Bellamy – Head Coach
- Stephen Kearney – Assistant Coach
- Marc Brentnall – Assistant Coach
- Aaron Bellamy – Development Coach
- Ryan Hinchcliffe – Development Coach
- Frank Ponissi – Football Director
- Ryan Hoffman – Football Administration Coordinator
- Craig McRae – Kicking & Catching Coach
- Billy Slater – Specialist Coach (Part-time)
- Cooper Cronk - Halves Coach (Part-time)
- Tim Glasby - Recruitment Officer and Pathways Manager
- Ben Jack – Victoria Thunderbolts (Under-21s) Head Coach
- Jon Buchanan – Easts Tigers Feeder Club Coach
- Sam Mahwinney – Sunshine Coast Falcons Feeder Club Coach

== 2021 squad ==
List current as of 14 June 2021

Cap	Nat.	Player name	Position	First Storm game	Previous First Grade RL club (Note: Previous First Grade RL club: This column denotes the previous RL club the player was signed to and played first grade RL for. If they are yet to debut then this is stipulated. If they were merely signed to the club but did not play then it is not counted)
119	(New Zealand)	Jesse Bromwich	PR	2010	(Australia) Melbourne Storm
149	(New Zealand)	Kenneath Bromwich	PR, SR, LK	2013	(Australia) Melbourne Storm
160	(Australia)	Cameron Munster	FE, FB	2014	(Australia) Melbourne Storm
163	(Australia)	Dale Finucane	PR, SR, LK	2015	(Australia) Canterbury Bulldogs
164	(Tonga)	Felise Kaufusi	PR	2015	(Australia) Melbourne Storm
166	(New Zealand)	Nelson Asofa-Solomona	SR, PR	2015	(Australia) Melbourne Storm
167	(Australia)	Christian Welch	SR, PR	2015	(Australia) Melbourne Storm
176	(Australia)	Josh Addo-Carr	WG	2017	(Australia) Wests Tigers
177	(Canada)	Ryley Jacks	FE	2017	(Australia) Gold Coast Titans
181	(Fiji)	Tui Kamikamica	SR, PR	2017	(Australia) Melbourne Storm
182	(New Zealand)	Brandon Smith	HK	2017	(Australia) Melbourne Storm
184	(New Zealand)	Jahrome Hughes	FE, FB	2017	(Australia) North Queensland Cowboys
187	(Papua New Guinea)	Justin Olam	WG, CE	2018	(Australia) Melbourne Storm
188	(Australia)	Harry Grant	HK	2018	(Australia) Melbourne Storm
192	(Australia)	Tom Eisenhuth	SR	2019	(Australia) Penrith Panthers
193	(Samoa)	Marion Seve	WG	2019	(Australia) Melbourne Storm
194	(Australia)	Ryan Papenhuyzen	FB	2019	(Australia) Melbourne Storm
198	(Australia)	Nicho Hynes	FB, FE	2019	(Australia) Melbourne Storm
199	(Australia)	Max King	PR	2019	(Australia) Gold Coast Titans
200	(Tonga)	Brenko Lee	CE	2020	(Australia) Gold Coast Titans
201	(Australia)	Chris Lewis	SR	2020	(Australia) Melbourne Storm
203	(Australia)	Darryn Schonig	PR	2020	(Australia) Melbourne Storm
204	(Australia)	Cooper Johns	FE	2020	(Australia) Melbourne Storm
205	(Fiji)	Isaac Lumelume	WG	2020	(Australia) Melbourne Storm
207	(New Zealand)	Aaron Pene	PR	2020	(Australia) Melbourne Storm
208	(Australia)	Aaron Booth	HK	2020	(Australia) Melbourne Storm
209	(Tonga)	George Jennings	WG	2021	(Australia) Parramatta Eels
210	(New Zealand)	Reimis Smith	WG	2021	(Australia) Canterbury Bulldogs
211	(Australia)	Tyson Smoothy	HK	2021	(Australia) Melbourne Storm
212	(Australia)	Trent Loiero	SR	2021	(Australia) Melbourne Storm
213	(Samoa)	Dean Ieremia	WG	2021	(Australia) Melbourne Storm
214	(Australia)	Jordan Grant	PR	2021	(Australia) Melbourne Storm
215	(Cook Islands)	Tepai Moeroa	SR, LK	2021	(Australia) Parramatta Eels
216	(Australia)	Daniel Atkinson	HB	2021	(Australia) Melbourne Storm
	(Australia)	Jack Howarth	SR	Yet to debut	(Australia) Melbourne Storm
	(New Zealand)	Judda Turahui	LK	Yet to debut	(Australia) Melbourne Storm
	(Australia)	Jonah Pezet	HB	Yet to debut	(Australia) Melbourne Storm
	(Australia)	Tyran Wishart	FE, HK	Yet to debut	(Australia) Melbourne Storm
	(Samoa)	Tagiolupe Tivalu	PR	Yet to debut	(Australia) Melbourne Storm
	(Samoa)	Sualauvi Fa'alogo	FB	Yet to debut	(Australia) Melbourne Storm

== Player movements ==
Losses

- Sandor Earl to Retirement
- Tino Fa'asuamaleaui to Gold Coast Titans
- Ricky Leutele to Huddersfield Giants
- Paul Momirovski to Wests Tigers (Note: 2020 season player loan deal: players returned to their original clubs at the end of 2020.) (Note: After being released back to the West Tigers following the completion of the loan period, Paul Momirovski was traded to the Penrith Panthers prior to the start of the 2021 season.)
- Cameron Smith to Retirement
- Kelma Tuilagi to Wests Tigers
- Albert Vete to Hull Kingston Rovers
- Suliasi Vunivalu to Queensland Reds, Super Rugby

Gains

- Harry Grant from Wests Tigers
- George Jennings from Parramatta Eels
- Reimis Smith from Canterbury Bulldogs
- Tepai Moeroa from NSW Waratahs, Super Rugby (Note: Midseason signing on June 10)
- Tyran Wishart from St George Illawarra Dragons (Note: Midseason signing announced on July 5)

== Representative honours ==
This table lists all players who have played a representative match in 2021.

Player	State of Origin 1	State of Origin 2	State of Origin 3
Josh Addo-Carr	New South Wales	New South Wales	New South Wales
Dale Finucane	—N/a	—N/a	New South Wales
Harry Grant	Queensland	—N/a	—N/a
Felise Kaufusi	Queensland	Queensland	Queensland
Cameron Munster	Queensland	Queensland	Queensland
Christian Welch	Queensland	Queensland	Queensland

== Statistics ==
This table contains playing statistics for all Melbourne Storm players to have played in the 2021 NRL season.

- Statistics sources:

Name	Appearances	Tries	Goals	Field goals	Points
Josh Addo-Carr	22	23	1	0	94
Nelson Asofa-Solomona	17	4	0	0	16
Daniel Atkinson	1	0	0	0	0
Aaron Booth	5	0	0	0	0
Jesse Bromwich	24	1	0	0	4
Kenneath Bromwich	21	3	0	0	12
Tom Eisenhuth	17	4	0	0	16
Dale Finucane	17	2	0	0	8
Harry Grant	15	5	0	0	20
Jordan Grant	3	0	0	0	0
Jahrome Hughes	24	9	0	0	36
Nicho Hynes	24	7	58	0	144
Dean Ieremia	10	6	0	0	24
Ryley Jacks	1	0	0	0	0
George Jennings	18	11	0	0	44
Cooper Johns	5	1	0	0	4
Tui Kamikamica	22	3	0	0	12
Felise Kaufusi	20	3	0	0	12
Chris Lewis	20	2	0	0	8
Trent Loiero	6	2	0	0	8
Isaac Lumelume	3	2	0	0	8
Tepai Moeroa	4	0	0	0	0
Cameron Munster	20	7	16	0	60
Justin Olam	25	12	0	0	48
Ryan Papenhuyzen	15	14	49	1/1	157
Aaron Pene	9	0	0	0	0
Darryn Schonig	1	0	0	0	0
Marion Seve	2	2	0	0	8
Brandon Smith	24	11	0	0	44
Reimis Smith	25	14	0	0	56
Tyson Smoothy	4	0	3	0	6
Christian Welch	21	2	0	0	8
32 players used	—	151	127	1/1	861

=== Scorers ===
Most points in a game: 26 points

- Round 4 - Ryan Papenhuyzen (4 Tries, 5 Goals) vs Brisbane Broncos

Most tries in a game: 6 (Note: New club record)

- Round 9 - Josh Addo-Carr vs South Sydney Rabbitohs

=== Winning games ===
Highest score in a winning game: 66 points

- Round 15 vs Wests Tigers

Lowest score in a winning game: 20 points

- Round 6 vs Sydney Roosters
- Round 13 vs Gold Coast Titans
- Round 19 vs North Queensland Cowboys

Greatest winning margin: 50 points

- Round 9 vs South Sydney Rabbitohs
- Round 15 vs Wests Tigers

Greatest number of games won consecutively: 19 (Note: New club and equal league record)

- Round 4 - Round 23

=== Losing games ===
Highest score in a losing game: 12 points

- Round 2 vs Parramatta Eels

Lowest score in a losing game: 6 points

- Preliminary Final vs Penrith Panthers

Greatest losing margin: 12 points

- Round 24 vs Parramatta Eels

Greatest number of games lost consecutively: 2

- Round 2 - Round 3

== Jerseys ==
In December 2020, Melbourne Storm announced a new 5 year sponsorship and apparel partnership agreement with British sportswear company, Castore replacing the partnership with ISC. Castore will produce new supporter wear and a new jersey for season 2021, the design was announced on 14 January 2021.

2021 Home colours	2021 Away colours

Home

The home jersey features a classic V shape on the chest and the return of yellow to the jersey for the first time since 2018. Among the special features Castore has incorporated in the new jersey is a lightning bolt design on the sleeve and the inclusion of a Big V logo on the inner collar as a continuation of the Our Home, Victoria acknowledgment which began during the 2020 season to honor Storm’s home state. The Victoria acknowledgment logo returned to the front of the jersey from Round 20 onwards.

Away

The away jersey, worn when the home jersey creates a clash with the opposition, is a similar design to the home jersey but in majority white; worn with navy blue shorts and either navy blue (Round 2) or white socks with navy blue cuffs (Rounds 3, 9, 14, 16, 19).

Special

Round 7 - Melbourne wore a unique jersey with sublimated Anzac Day details including a large red Remembrance poppy, silhouettes of soldiers, and the Anzac Appeal logo.

Round 12 & 18 - An Indigenous Round jersey for the first time based on a white jersey template, designed by Melbourne AFLW player Krstel Petrevski. The jersey features the names of the 16 past and present Indigenous Storm players.

Round 21 – A white heritage jersey based upon the clash design worn in the club's first ever trial game, and worn once during the 1998 NRL season.

== Awards ==
=== Trophy Cabinet ===
- 2021 J. J. Giltinan Shield
- 2021 Michael Moore Trophy

=== Melbourne Storm Awards Night ===
Held at The Glasshouse, Melbourne, Friday 10 December 2021.

- Melbourne Storm Player of the Year: Jahrome Hughes
- Billy Slater Rookie of the Year: Dean Ieremia
- Melbourne Storm Members' Player of Year: Jahrome Hughes
- Melbourne Storm Most Improved: Nicho Hynes
- Melbourne Storm Best Back: Ryan Papenhuyzen
- Melbourne Storm Best Forward: Brandon Smith
- Cooper Cronk Feeder Club Player of the Year: Marion Seve
- Darren Bell U20s Player of the Year: Antonio Sanele
- Greg Brentnall Young Achievers Award (U18s): Jay Natapu
- Mick Moore Club Person of the Year: Meirion Jones (Head Physiotherapist)
- Chairman’s Award: Michael Christo (General Manager – Corporate Affairs, Government Relations and Community)
- Best Try: George Jennings, Round 18 vs Knights

=== Dally M Awards Night ===
Held at Howard Smith Wharves, Brisbane on Monday 27 September 2021.

- Dally M Centre of the Year: Justin Olam
- Dally M Hooker of the Year: Brandon Smith
- Dally M Coach of the Year: Craig Bellamy
- Therabody NRL Young Gun of the Year: Nicho Hynes
- Peter Frilingos Headline Moment: Melbourne Storm's 19-match winning streak

=== Rugby League Players’ Association Awards ===
- Dennis Tutty Award: Christian Welch
- RLPA Centre of the Year: Justin Olam
- RLPA Hooker of the Year: Brandon Smith

=== Additional awards ===
- Spirit of Anzac Medal: Jahrome Hughes
- NRL Community Young Person of the Year: Halle Braybon
- New Zealand Kiwi Player of the Year: Jahrome Hughes
