= 2020 Melbourne Storm season =

- 2020 NRL premiers
- NRL Rank: 2nd
- Play-off result: Premiers
- 2020 record: Wins: 16; draws: 0; losses: 4
- Points scored: For: 534; against: 276

Team information
- CEO: Dave Donaghy
- Coach: Craig Bellamy
- Captain: Cameron Smith (19 Games) Jesse Bromwich (2 Games) Kenny Bromwich (1 Game) Ryan Papenhuyzen (1 Game)
- Stadium: AAMI Park - 30,050 (2 games); Netstrata Jubilee Stadium - 20,500 (1 game); Suncorp Stadium - 52,500 (3 games); Sunshine Coast Stadium - 12, 000 (6 games)

Top scorers
- Tries: Josh Addo-Carr (16)
- Goals: Cameron Smith (70)
- Points: Cameron Smith (184)
| ← 2019 | List of seasons | 2021 → |

The 2020 Melbourne Storm season was the 23rd in the club's history and they competed in the 2020 NRL season. The team was coached by Craig Bellamy, coaching the club for his 18th consecutive season. Melbourne Storm were also captained by Cameron Smith, who had been the sole captain for the team since 2008—making this his 13th consecutive season. The season was suspended indefinitely on 23 March due to the ongoing COVID-19 pandemic; however, on 28 April the NRL announced it would recommence on 28 May as a 20 Round competition with a revised fixture.

After the recommencement of the season, Melbourne Storm initially played home games at AAMI Park as usual; however, an escalation in coronavirus cases and a subsequent second lock-down in the state of Victoria forced the Storm to relocate in late June, firstly, to New South Wales and then to the Sunshine Coast in Queensland. This has meant that the Storm have had to play home games at multiple venues interstate throughout the 2020 season including Netstrata Jubilee Stadium in Sydney, Suncorp Stadium in Brisbane and Sunshine Coast Stadium on the Sunshine Coast.

The club had a successful season on the field and after twenty rounds, finishing the regular season in second spot and earning a "home" qualifying final against the Parramatta Eels which was played at Suncorp Stadium in Brisbane. The Storm won this final, progressing through to a week three preliminary final at the same venue, where they played and defeated the Canberra Raiders for a spot in the 2020 NRL Grand Final. The Storm defeated the Penrith Panthers in the 2020 NRL Grand Final to finish the season as Premiers.

== Season summary ==
- Pre-season – New recruits took part in Melbourne Storm IDQ camp for pre season training before New Years. Aaron Booth was awarded the IDQ Iron bar.
- 14–15 February – Melbourne lose both their matches at the 2020 NRL Nines in Perth, to finish bottom of Pool 4. Sandor Earl and Tui Kamikamica were named as co-captains of a squad which included Fijian Siti Moceidreke.
- Round 1 – The Storm continued their unbeaten run in Round 1 matches a record that stretches back to 2001 by defeating Manly at Brookvale Oval.
- Round 2 – The Melbourne Storm defeated Cronulla at an empty WIN Stadium. All NRL matches were played in empty stadiums for the first time in the league's history, in response to government restrictions on non-essential public gatherings of 500 or more people due to the COVID-19 pandemic.
- 23 March – Due to the escalating COVID-19 pandemic, the 2020 NRL season was indefinitely suspended, for the first time in history.
- 28 April – The NRL announce that the competition will resume on 28 May and that it would be cut back a 20-round season, with the first two rounds scores and points remaining. The NRL will also release a revised fixture.
- 4 May – The Storm announce that they will temporarily set up a training camp in Albury, New South Wales to prepare for the resumption of the NRL season. Restrictions on group gatherings mean't it could not happen in Victoria.
- 7 May – The Storm begin their training camp at the home of Albury Tigers Football Club after the Albury Council elected to prevent the club using the local government managed Greenfield Park.
- 11 May – The Victorian State Government ease restrictions allowing the Storm to train in Victoria.
- 15 May – The NRL release the revised fixture for Rounds 3 and 4. Melbourne Storm will play the Round 3 fixture on 30 May.
- 21 May – The full revised fixture is released for the remainder of 2020. Venues are only confirmed to Round 9, with the Storm to play home games at AAMI Park at this stage with no crowd.
- Round 3 – On 30 May the Melbourne Storm recommenced their season with a 22–6 loss against the Canberra Raiders.
- Round 4 – The Storm return to the winners list with a win over the South Sydney Rabbitohs. Brenko Lee and Chris Lewis both make their playing debuts (For the Storm and NRL respectively). Brenko Lee also became the 200th player to play a game for the Melbourne Storm.
- 23 June – The Melbourne Storm and NRL announce that the team will relocate indefinitely to either NSW or QLD after a sharp increase in coronavirus cases over the previous week in Victoria
- Round 7 – The Storm defeat the NZ Warriors 50–6 in their home game at Netstrata Jubilee Stadium in Sydney the match was notable as following the game Cameron Smith, Craig Bellamy and Ryan Hoffman all went into the Warriors' room to thank and acknowledge the sacrifice that they are making by moving to Australia during the COVID pandemic. In addition, West Tigers Loan player Paul Momirovski made his debut for the Storm scoring 2 tries.
- 27 June – Further to the report on 23 June the Storm confirm that they will indefinitely relocate to the Sunshine Coast, Queensland playing home games out of Suncorp Stadium.
- Round 8 – The Storm defeat the Sydney Roosters 27-25 after the game was sent into Golden Point with Ryan Papenhuyzen leveling the scores by kicking a field goal with 10 seconds remaining in regular time.
- 8 July – Melbourne Storm announce that they will play their next three home matches at Sunshine Coast Stadium (Rounds 10, 12 and 13).
- Round 9 – The Storm defeat the Canberra Raiders 20–14. Darryn Schonig made his NRL debut and Cameron Smith reached another milestone with 300 wins in the NRL.
- Round 10 – Melbourne Storm play their first home game on the Sunshine Coast with a 42–6 win over the Gold Coast Titans.
- Round 12 – The Storm defeat the Knights in their 6th consecutive win. Cameron Smith injures his shoulder while scoring his try.
- Round 13 – Due to the injury and resting of Cameron Smith, Jesse Bromwich was named as acting captain. Originally Dale Finucane was named as a co-captain but dropped out of the side due to a minor injury. Jahrome Hughes played his 50th game for the Storm after playing his 50th NRL game overall two weeks earlier in the win over Canterbury.
- 18 August – The Storm announce that the remaining 3 home games in the 2020 season will be played at Sunshine Coast Stadium
- Round 15 – Kenny Bromwich is announced as captain of the team replacing brother Jesse due to suspension, Kenny becomes the club's 22nd Captain. Also Cooper John (son of Matthew Johns) will make his NRL debut.
- Round 19 – Melbourne secure 2nd spot on the ladder after defeating Wests Tigers at Sunshine Coast stadium. This game was also notable as it was the club's 600th game in the NRL.
- Round 20 – The Melbourne Storm make massive changes to the side resting almost the entire team that won in Round 19 due to them not being able to lose second place. Ryan Papenhuyzen is announced as the captain for the team making him the fourth captain in 2020 and 23rd overall for the club. In addition, the game saw both Aaron Booth and Aaron Pene making their NRL debuts and Ricky Leutele making his Storm debut this also meant that the Storm had used a total of 32 players in its 2020 season more than any other season to date. Finally Max King played his 50th NRL game.
- Finals Week 1 – The Storm defeat the Parramatta Eels to earn a week off and progress straight to Week 3 and a "Home" preliminary final.
- Finals Week 3 – The Storm defeat the Canberra Raiders to advance to the 2020 NRL Grand Final. Dale Finucane plays his 200th NRL Game.
- Grand final – The Storm defeat the Panthers 26-20 finishing with 11 players on the field to be crowned Premiers.

=== Milestone games ===
| Round | Player | Milestone |
|---|---|---|
| Round 4 | Brenko Lee | Storm debut |
| Round 4 | Chris Lewis | NRL debut |
| Round 6 | Suliasi Vunivalu | 100th Game |
| Round 7 | Paul Momirovski | Storm debut |
| Round 8 | Brandon Smith | 50th Game |
| Round 9 | Darryn Schonig | NRL debut |
| Round 9 | Cameron Smith | 300th Victory |
| Round 11 | Albert Vete | 50th Game |
| Round 11 | Jahrome Hughes | 50th Game |
| Round 15 | Cooper Johns | NRL debut |
| Round 16 | Isaac Lumelume | NRL debut |
| Round 17 | Josh Addo-Carr | 100th Game |
| Round 19 | Melbourne Storm | 600th Game |
| Round 20 | Aaron Booth | NRL debut |
| Round 20 | Aaron Pene | NRL debut |
| Round 20 | Max King | 50th Game |
| Round 20 | Ricky Leutele | Storm debut |
| Preliminary Final | Dale Finucane | 200th Game |

== Fixtures ==
=== Pre-season ===
| Date | Round | Opponent | Venue | Result | Mel. | Opp. | Source |
|---|---|---|---|---|---|---|---|
| 14 February | 2020 NRL Nines Pool Game | Manly Sea Eagles | HBF Park, Perth | Loss | 4 | 18 | |
| 15 February | 2020 NRL Nines Pool Game | Brisbane Broncos | HBF Park, Perth | Loss | 8 | 12 | |
| 22 February | Trial | New Zealand Warriors | Central Energy Trust Arena, Palmerston North | Win | 18 | 16 | |
| 29 February | Trial | North Queensland Cowboys | Casey Fields, Cranbourne | Win | 22 | 14 | |

=== Regular season ===
- (GP) - Golden Point extra time
- (pen) - Penalty try

| Date | Round | Opponent | Home/away | Venue | Result | Mel. | Opp. | Tries | Goals | Field goals | Report |
|---|---|---|---|---|---|---|---|---|---|---|---|
| 15 March | 1 | Manly Sea Eagles | Away | Lottoland, Sydney | Won | 18 | 4 | S Vunivalu (2), T Eisenhuth | C Smith 3/4 | | |
| 21 March | 2 | Cronulla Sharks | Away | Netstrata Jubilee Stadium, Sydney | Won | 12 | 10 | T Kamikamica | C Smith 4/4 | | |
| 30 May | 3 | Canberra Raiders | Home | AAMI Park, Melbourne | Lost | 6 | 22 | D Finucane | C Smith 1/1 | | |
| 5 June | 4 | South Sydney Rabbitohs | Home | AAMI Park, Melbourne | Won | 22 | 8 | R Papenhuyzen, S Vunivalu, J Addo-Carr, J Olam | C Smith 3/5 | | |
| 13 June | 5 | Newcastle Knights | Away | Central Coast Stadium, Gosford | Won | 26 | 12 | R Jacks, S Vunivalu, T Faasuamaleaui, B Smith | C Smith 5/5 | | |
| 19 June | 6 | Penrith Panthers | Away | Campbelltown Stadium, Sydney | Lost | 14 | 21 | F Kaufusi, B Lee | C Smith 3/3 | | |
| 26 June | 7 | New Zealand Warriors | Home | Netstrata Jubilee Stadium, Sydney | Won | 50 | 6 | S Vunivalu (3), P Momirovski (2), R Papenhuyzen (2), B Smith, J Addo-Carr | C Smith 7/9 | | |
| 2 July | 8 | Sydney Roosters | Home | Suncorp Stadium, Brisbane | Won (GP) | 27 | 25 | J Hughes (2), J Addo-Carr, P Momirovski | C Smith 5/5 | R Papenhuyzen 1/1 | |
| 11 July | 9 | Canberra Raiders | Away | GIO Stadium, Canberra | Won | 20 | 14 | B Lee, J Addo-Carr, R Papenhuyzen | C Smith 4/4 | | |
| 17 July | 10 | Gold Coast Titans | Home | Sunshine Coast Stadium, Sunshine Coast | Won | 42 | 6 | J Addo-Carr (2), N Asofa-Solomona (2), C Munster, B Lee, B Smith | C Smith 7/8 | | |
| 24 July | 11 | Brisbane Broncos | Away | Suncorp Stadium, Brisbane | Won | 46 | 8 | J Addo-Carr (2), J Hughes (2), T Faasuamaleaui (2), K Bromwich, R Papenhuyzen | C Smith 7/9 | | |
| 2 August | 12 | Newcastle Knights | Home | Sunshine Coast Stadium, Sunshine Coast | Won | 26 | 16 | S Vunivalu, C Smith, R Papenhuyzen, T Faasuamaleaui | C Smith 2/2, C Munster 3/4 | | |
| 8 August | 13 | Canterbury Bulldogs | Home | Sunshine Coast Stadium, Sunshine Coast | Won | 41 | 10 | J Addo-Carr (2), K Bromwich (2), N Hynes, J Olam, S Vunivalu | C Munster 3/4, N Hynes 3/3 | C Munster 1/1 | |
| 13 August | 14 | Sydney Roosters | Away | Sydney Cricket Ground, Sydney | Won | 24 | 6 | J Olam (2). J Hughes, F Kaufusi | R Papenhuyzen 4/5 | | |
| 20 August | 15 | Parramatta Eels | Away | Bankwest Stadium, Parramatta | Lost | 0 | 14 | | | | |
| 30 August | 16 | Manly Sea Eagles | Home | Sunshine Coast Stadium, Sunshine Coast | Won | 30 | 6 | J Olam (3), J Addo-Carr (2), N Asofa-Solomona | C Smith 3/6 | | |
| 4 September | 17 | South Sydney Rabbitohs | Away | ANZ Stadium, Sydney | Won | 22 | 16 | R Papenhuyzen, J Olam, T Faasuamaleaui, C Munster | C Smith 3/4 | | |
| 13 September | 18 | North Queensland Cowboys | Home | Sunshine Coast Stadium, Sunshine Coast | Won | 36 | 20 | C Munster (2), N Asofa-Solomona, T Faasuamaleaui, J Addo-Carr | C Smith 6/6 | | |
| 19 September | 19 | Wests Tigers | Home | Sunshine Coast Stadium, Sunshine Coast | Won | 50 | 22 | S Vunivalu (2), J Addo-Carr (2), N Hynes, J Hughes, J Olam, C Smith, T Faasuamaleaui | C Smith 7/9 | | |
| 27 September | 20 | St George-Illawarra Dragons | Away | Netstrata Jubilee Stadium, Sydney | Lost | 22 | 30 | P Momirovski, S Earl, C Lewis, I Lumelume, N Hynes | R Papenhuyzen 0/4, N Hynes 1/1 | | |

=== Finals ===
| Date | Round | Opponent | Venue | Result | Mel. | Opp. | Tries | Goals | Field Goals | Report |
|---|---|---|---|---|---|---|---|---|---|---|
| 3 October | Week 1 - Qualifying Final | Parramatta Eels | Suncorp Stadium, Brisbane | Won | 36 | 24 | R Papenhuyzen (2), S Vunivalu, J Addo-Carr, J Bromwich, B Lee | C Smith 6/6 | | |
| 16 October | Week 3 - Preliminary Final | Canberra Raiders | Suncorp Stadium, Brisbane | Won | 30 | 10 | J Addo-Carr, R Papenhuyzen, S Vunivalu, J Olam, D Finucane | C Smith 5/6 | | |
| 25 October | Week 4 - Grand Final | Penrith Panthers | ANZ Stadium, Sydney | Won | 26 | 20 | J Olam, S Vunivalu, C Smith, R Papenhuyzen | C Smith 5/6 | | |

=== Original regular season fixture ===
This was the original fixture for the Melbourne Storm prior to the COVID-19 pandemic causing the season to be altered and rescheduled.

| Date | Round | Opponent | Venue |
|---|---|---|---|
| 15 March | 1 | Manly Sea Eagles | Lottoland, Sydney |
| 21 March | 2 | Cronulla Sharks | Netstrata Jubilee Stadium, Sydney |
| 28 March | 3 | Penrith Panthers | AAMI Park, Melbourne |
| 2 April | 4 | South Sydney Rabbitohs | AAMI Park, Melbourne |
| 11 April | 5 | Gold Coast Titans | AAMI Park, Melbourne |
| 16 April | 6 | North Queensland Cowboys | North Queensland Stadium, Townsville |
| 25 April | 7 | New Zealand Warriors | AAMI Park, Melbourne |
| 3 May | 8 | St George-Illawarra Dragons | Suncorp Stadium, Brisbane |
| 11 May | 9 | Sydney Roosters | Sydney Cricket Ground, Sydney |
| 16 May | 10 | Parramatta Eels | AAMI Park, Melbourne |
| 26 May | 11 | New Zealand Warriors | Mt Smart Stadium, Auckland |
| | 12 | Bye | |
| 6 June | 13 | Canberra Raiders | AAMI Park, Melbourne |
| 13 June | 14 | Newcastle Knights | McDonald Jones Stadium, Newcastle |
| 26 June | 15 | Brisbane Broncos | Suncorp Stadium, Brisbane |
| 3 July | 16 | Wests Tigers | AAMI Park, Melbourne |
| 11 July | 17 | Gold Coast Titans | Cbus Super Stadium, Gold Coast |
| 18 July | 18 | Canterbury Bulldogs | HBF Park, Perth |
| 24 July | 19 | Cronulla Sharks | AAMI Park, Melbourne |
| 30 July | 20 | South Sydney Rabbitohs | Bankwest Stadium, Parramatta |
| 6 August | 21 | North Queensland Cowboys | AAMI Park, Melbourne |
| 14 August | 22 | Parramatta Eels | Bankwest Stadium, Parramatta |
| 21 August | 23 | Sydney Roosters | AAMI Park, Melbourne |
| 29 August | 24 | Brisbane Broncos | AAMI Park, Melbourne |
| 5 September | 25 | Canberra Raiders | GIO Stadium, Canberra |

== Ladder ==
| Pos | Team | Pld | W | D | L | B | PF | PA | PD | Pts | |
|---|---|---|---|---|---|---|---|---|---|---|---|
| 1 | Penrith Panthers (M) | 20 | 18 | 1 | 1 | 0 | 537 | 238 | +299 | 37 | Advance to finals series |
| 2 | Melbourne Storm (P) | 20 | 16 | 0 | 4 | 0 | 534 | 276 | +258 | 32 | Advance to finals series |
| 3 | Parramatta Eels | 20 | 15 | 0 | 5 | 0 | 392 | 288 | +104 | 30 | Advance to finals series |
| 4 | Sydney Roosters | 20 | 14 | 0 | 6 | 0 | 552 | 322 | +230 | 28 | Advance to finals series |
| 5 | Canberra Raiders | 20 | 14 | 0 | 6 | 0 | 445 | 317 | +128 | 28 | Advance to finals series |
| 6 | South Sydney Rabbitohs | 20 | 12 | 0 | 8 | 0 | 521 | 352 | +169 | 24 | Advance to finals series |
| 7 | Newcastle Knights | 20 | 11 | 1 | 8 | 0 | 421 | 374 | +47 | 23 | Advance to finals series |
| 8 | Cronulla-Sutherland Sharks | 20 | 10 | 0 | 10 | 0 | 480 | 480 | 0 | 20 | Advance to finals series |
| 9 | Gold Coast Titans | 20 | 9 | 0 | 11 | 0 | 346 | 463 | −117 | 18 | |
| 10 | New Zealand Warriors | 20 | 8 | 0 | 12 | 0 | 343 | 458 | −115 | 16 | |
| 11 | Wests Tigers | 20 | 7 | 0 | 13 | 0 | 440 | 505 | −65 | 14 | |
| 12 | St. George Illawarra Dragons | 20 | 7 | 0 | 13 | 0 | 378 | 452 | −74 | 14 | |
| 13 | Manly Warringah Sea Eagles | 20 | 7 | 0 | 13 | 0 | 375 | 509 | −134 | 14 | |
| 14 | North Queensland Cowboys | 20 | 5 | 0 | 15 | 0 | 368 | 520 | −152 | 10 | |
| 15 | Canterbury-Bankstown Bulldogs | 20 | 3 | 0 | 17 | 0 | 282 | 504 | −222 | 6 | |
| 16 | Brisbane Broncos (W) | 20 | 3 | 0 | 17 | 0 | 268 | 624 | −356 | 6 | |

Updated to match(es) played on 27 September 2020. Source: 2020 NRL Ladder
(M) Minor premiers; (P) Premiers; (W) Wooden spoon

== Coaching staff ==
- Craig Bellamy – Head Coach
- Jason Ryles – Senior Assistant Coach
- Marc Brentnall – Assistant Coach
- Ben Jack – U/20s Head Coach
- Aaron Bellamy – Development Coach
- Ryan Hinchcliffe – Development Coach
- Frank Ponissi – Football Director
- Ryan Hoffman – Football Administration Coordinator
- Nick Maxwell – Leadership Coach
- Craig McRae – Kicking & Catching Coach
- Billy Slater – Specialist Coach (Part-time)
- Craig Hodges – Easts Tigers Feeder Club Coach
- Sam Mawhinney – Sunshine Coast Falcons Feeder Club Coach

== 2020 squad ==
List current as of 10 October 2020

| Cap | Nat. | Player name | Position | First Storm game | Previous First Grade RL club (Note: Previous First Grade RL club: This column denotes the previous RL club the player was signed to and played first grade RL for. If they are yet to debut then this is stipulated. If they were merely signed to the club but did not play then it is not counted) |
|---|---|---|---|---|---|
| 55 | (Australia) | Cameron Smith (c) | HK | 2002 | (Australia) Melbourne Storm |
| 119 | (New Zealand) | Jesse Bromwich | PR | 2010 | (Australia) Melbourne Storm |
| 149 | (New Zealand) | Kenny Bromwich | PR, SR, LK | 2013 | (Australia) Melbourne Storm |
| 160 | (Australia) | Cameron Munster | FE, FB | 2014 | (Australia) Melbourne Storm |
| 163 | (Australia) | Dale Finucane | PR, SR, LK | 2015 | (Australia) Canterbury Bulldogs |
| 164 | (Tonga) | Felise Kaufusi | PR | 2015 | (Australia) Melbourne Storm |
| 166 | (New Zealand) | Nelson Asofa-Solomona | SR, PR | 2015 | (Australia) Melbourne Storm |
| 167 | (Australia) | Christian Welch | SR, PR | 2015 | (Australia) Melbourne Storm |
| 171 | (Fiji) | Suliasi Vunivalu | WG | 2016 | (Australia) Melbourne Storm |
| 176 | (Australia) | Josh Addo-Carr | WG, FB | 2017 | (Australia) Wests Tigers |
| 177 | (Canada) | Ryley Jacks | FE | 2017 | (Australia) Gold Coast Titans |
| 181 | (Fiji) | Tui Kamikamica | SR, PR | 2017 | (Australia) Melbourne Storm |
| 182 | (New Zealand) | Brandon Smith | HK | 2017 | (Australia) Melbourne Storm |
| 184 | (New Zealand) | Jahrome Hughes | FE, FB | 2017 | (Australia) North Queensland Cowboys |
| 187 | (Papua New Guinea) | Justin Olam | WG, CE | 2018 | (Australia) Melbourne Storm |
| 188 | (Australia) | Harry Grant | HK | 2018 | (Australia) Melbourne Storm |
| 190 | (Tonga) | Albert Vete | PR | 2018 | New Zealand Warriors |
| 192 | (Australia) | Tom Eisenhuth | SR | 2019 | (Australia) Penrith Panthers |
| 193 | (Samoa) | Marion Seve | WG | 2019 | (Australia) Melbourne Storm |
| 194 | (Australia) | Ryan Papenhuyzen | FB | 2019 | (Australia) Melbourne Storm |
| 195 | (New Zealand) | Sandor Earl | WG | 2019 | (Australia) Canberra Raiders |
| 197 | (Samoa) | Tino Fa'asuamaleaui | PR | 2019 | (Australia) Melbourne Storm |
| 198 | (Australia) | Nicho Hynes | CE | 2019 | (Australia) Melbourne Storm |
| 199 | (Australia) | Max King | PR | 2019 | (Australia) Gold Coast Titans |
| 200 | (Tonga) | Brenko Lee | CE | 2020 | (Australia) Gold Coast Titans |
| 201 | (Australia) | Chris Lewis | SR | 2020 | (Australia) Melbourne Storm |
| 202 | (Australia) | Paul Momirovski | CE | 2020 | (Australia) Wests Tigers |
| 203 | (Australia) | Darryn Schonig | PR | 2020 | (Australia) Melbourne Storm |
| 204 | (Australia) | Cooper Johns | FE | 2020 | (Australia) Melbourne Storm |
| 205 | (Fiji) | Isaac Lumelume | WG | 2020 | (Australia) Melbourne Storm |
| 206 | (Samoa) | Ricky Leutele | CT | 2020 | (Canada) Toronto Wolfpack |
| 207 | (New Zealand) | Aaron Pene | PR | 2020 | (Australia) Melbourne Storm |
| 208 | (Australia) | Aaron Booth | HK | 2020 | (Australia) Melbourne Storm |
| | (Australia) | Daniel Atkinson | HB | Yet to debut | (Australia) Melbourne Storm |
| | (Australia) | Jack Bowyer | WG | Yet to debut | (Australia) Melbourne Storm |
| | (Australia) | Dean Ieremia | WG | Yet to debut | (Australia) Melbourne Storm |
| | (Australia) | Trent Loiero | SR | Yet to debut | (Australia) Melbourne Storm |
| | (Samoa) | Kelma Tuilagi | SR | Yet to debut | (Australia) Melbourne Storm |
| | (New Zealand) | Judda Turahui | LK | Yet to debut | (Australia) Melbourne Storm |

== 2020 Premiership Team ==
Melbourne Storm
| 2020 Premiership Team | Interchange | Coach |
|---|---|---|
| 1 Ryan Papenhuyzen – FB; 2 Suliasi Vunivalu – WG; 3 Brenko Lee – CE; 4 Justin Olam – CE; 5 Josh Addo-Carr – WG; 6 Cameron Munster – FE; 7 Jahrome Hughes – HB; 8 Jesse Bromwich – PR; 9 Cameron Smith (c) – HK; 10 Christian Welch – PR; 11 Felise Kaufusi – SR; 12 Kenny Bromwich – SR; 13 Nelson Asofa-Solomona – LK | 14 Brandon Smith; 15 Tino Fa'asuamaleaui; 16 Dale Finucane; 17 Nicho Hynes | Head coach: Craig Bellamy; Legend: (c) Captain(s); (vc) Vice-captain(s) |

== Player movements ==
Losses

- Will Chambers to Suntory Sungoliath, Japan Rugby Football Union
- Brodie Croft to Brisbane Broncos
- Solomone Kata to ACT Brumbies, Super Rugby
- Curtis Scott to Canberra Raiders
- Joe Stimson to Canterbury Bulldogs
- Billy Walters to Wests Tigers
- Harry Grant to Wests Tigers (Note: 2020 season player loan deal: players returned to their original clubs at the end of 2020.)

Gains

- Ryley Jacks from Gold Coast Titans
- Paul Momirovski from West Tigers
- Ricky Leutele from Toronto Wolfpack (mid-season)

== Representative honours ==
This table lists all players who have played a representative match in 2020.

=== Representative season changes ===
Due to the COVID-19 pandemic, the 2020 representative season was rescheduled by the NRL as follows:

- State of Origin - The 2020 State of Origin Series was moved from its usual time slot in June/July to November - post NRL season.
- Internationals - All international matches were cancelled.

| Player | 2020 All Stars match | State of Origin 1 | State of Origin 2 | State of Origin 3 |
|---|---|---|---|---|
| Josh Addo-Carr | Indigenous All Stars | New South Wales | New South Wales | New South Wales |
| Jahrome Hughes | Maori All Stars | —N/a | —N/a | —N/a |
| Jesse Bromwich | Maori All Stars | —N/a | —N/a | —N/a |
| Brandon Smith | Maori All Stars | —N/a | —N/a | —N/a |
| Kenny Bromwich | Maori All Stars | —N/a | —N/a | —N/a |
| Tino Fa'asuamaleaui | —N/a | Queensland | Queensland | Queensland |
| Felise Kaufusi | —N/a | Queensland | Queensland | Queensland |
| Cameron Munster | —N/a | Queensland | Queensland | Queensland |
| Christian Welch | —N/a | Queensland | —N/a | Queensland |
| Dale Finucane | —N/a | —N/a | New South Wales | New South Wales |
| Brenko Lee | —N/a | —N/a | —N/a | Queensland |

== Statistics ==
This table contains playing statistics for all Melbourne Storm players to have played in the 2020 NRL season. The table is up to date as of end of the 2020 regular season, it does not include statistics from finals matches.

Statistics source:

| Name | Appearances | Tries | Goals | Field goals | Points |
|---|---|---|---|---|---|
| Josh Addo-Carr | 18 | 15 | 0 | 0 | 60 |
| Nelson Asofa-Solomona | 17 | 4 | 0 | 0 | 16 |
| Aaron Booth | 1 | 0 | 0 | 0 | 0 |
| Jesse Bromwich | 16 | 0 | 0 | 0 | 0 |
| Kenny Bromwich | 18 | 3 | 0 | 0 | 12 |
| Sandor Earl | 2 | 1 | 0 | 0 | 4 |
| Tom Eisenhuth | 13 | 1 | 0 | 0 | 4 |
| Tino Fa'asuamaleaui | 19 | 7 | 0 | 0 | 28 |
| Dale Finucane | 13 | 1 | 0 | 0 | 4 |
| Jahrome Hughes | 16 | 7 | 0 | 0 | 28 |
| Nicho Hynes | 9 | 3 | 4 | 0 | 20 |
| Ryley Jacks | 9 | 1 | 0 | 0 | 4 |
| Cooper Johns | 2 | 0 | 0 | 0 | 0 |
| Tui Kamikamica | 5 | 1 | 0 | 0 | 4 |
| Felise Kaufusi | 18 | 2 | 0 | 0 | 8 |
| Max King | 6 | 0 | 0 | 0 | 0 |
| Brenko Lee | 11 | 3 | 0 | 0 | 12 |
| Ricky Leutele | 1 | 0 | 0 | 0 | 0 |
| Chris Lewis | 5 | 1 | 0 | 0 | 4 |
| Isaac Lumelume | 3 | 1 | 0 | 0 | 4 |
| Paul Momirovski | 6 | 4 | 0 | 0 | 16 |
| Cameron Munster | 15 | 4 | 6 | 1 | 29 |
| Justin Olam | 18 | 9 | 0 | 0 | 36 |
| Ryan Papenhuyzen | 17 | 7 | 4 | 1 | 37 |
| Aaron Pene | 1 | 0 | 0 | 0 | 0 |
| Darryn Schonig | 6 | 0 | 0 | 0 | 0 |
| Marion Seve | 7 | 0 | 0 | 0 | 0 |
| Brandon Smith | 15 | 3 | 0 | 0 | 12 |
| Cameron Smith | 16 | 2 | 70 | 0 | 148 |
| Albert Vete | 6 | 0 | 0 | 0 | 0 |
| Suliasi Vunivalu | 14 | 11 | 0 | 0 | 44 |
| Christian Welch | 16 | 0 | 0 | 0 | 0 |
| 32 players used | — | 91 | 84 | 2 | 534 |

Scorers

Most points in a game: 18 points

- Round 19 : Cameron Smith (1 Try, 7 goals) vs. West Tigers

Most tries in a game: 3

- Round 7: Suliasi Vunivalu vs. New Zealand Warriors
- Round 16: Justin Olam vs. Manly Sea Eagles

Winning games

Highest score in a winning game: 50 points

- Round 7: vs. New Zealand Warriors
- Round 19: vs. West Tigers

Lowest score in a winning game: 12 points

- Round 2: vs. Cronulla Sharks

Greatest winning margin: 46 points

- Round 7: vs. New Zealand Warriors

Greatest number of games won consecutively: 8

- Round 7 - Round 14

Losing games

Highest score in a losing game: 22 points

- Round 20 vs. St. George Illawarra Dragons

Lowest score in a losing game: 0 points

- Round 15 vs. Parramatta Eels

Greatest losing margin: 16 points

- Round 3 vs. Canberra Raiders

== Jerseys ==
On 1 March 2020 at the Melbourne Storm family day the Storm unveiled their new jersey for 2020 which included a new major sponsor - Redzed Lending Solutions. The new jersey is predominantly navy blue and purple with fading chevrons down the front and white lightning bolts on the sides. Throughout the season the club also wore some commemorative jerseys namely for Indigenous round also an Anzac jersey was created, but because of the suspension of the season it was not worn until June. Also as of 13 June 2020 the Club added an embroidered V with the words "Our home Victoria" to both home and away jerseys to show support for their home state during the COVID pandemic. There was a change in sponsorship from Round 18 onwards with Rockcote replacing TigerAir on the front of the jersey and fuelyourlife.com.au replacing Tigerair on the back, this was due the brand being retired in Australia by Virgin Australia. Both new sponsors are also sponsor of the Sunshine Coast Lightning as well.

Jersey choice
| RD1 | RD2 | RD3 | RD4 | RD5 | RD6 | RD7 | RD8 | RD9 | RD10 | RD11 | RD12 | RD13 | RD14 | RD15 | RD16 | RD17 | RD18 | RD19 | RD20 | QF | SF | PF | GF |
|---|---|---|---|---|---|---|---|---|---|---|---|---|---|---|---|---|---|---|---|---|---|---|---|
| Clash | Home | Home | Home | Clash | Clash | ANZAC^{#} | Home | Home | Home | Clash | Indigenous^ | Home | Clash | Clash | Home | Clash | Home | Home | Home | Home | — | Home | Clash |

^{#} The jersey designed for ANZAC Day commemorations was eventually worn against the Warriors in the Michael Moore Trophy game.
^ Designed by Ky-ya Nicholson Ward.

== Awards ==
=== Trophy Cabinet ===
- 2020 Provan-Summons Trophy
- 2020 Michael Moore Trophy
- Australasia's Best Sports Team 2020 (2016-2020)

=== Melbourne Storm Awards Night ===
Held at Novotel, Sunshine Coast on Monday 27 October.

- Melbourne Storm Player of the Year: Cameron Smith
- Billy Slater Rookie of the Year: Tino Fa'asuamaleaui
- Melbourne Storm Members' Player of Year: Ryan Papenhuyzen
- Melbourne Storm Most Improved: Justin Olam
- Melbourne Storm Best Back: Ryan Papenhuyzen
- Melbourne Storm Best Forward: Brandon Smith
- Cooper Cronk Feeder Club Player of the Year: Isaac Lumelume
- Mick Moore Club Person of the Year: Daniel Di Pasqua
- Best Try: Ryan Papenhuyzen, Round 12 vs Knights

=== Dally M Awards Night ===
Held via virtual ceremony broadcast by Fox Sports.

- Dally M Winger of the Year: Josh Addo-Carr
- Dally M Hooker of the Year: Cameron Smith

=== Rugby League Players’ Association Awards Night ===
- RLPA Hooker of the Year: Cameron Smith

=== Additional awards ===
- I Don't Quit Iron Bar: Aaron Booth
- Preston Campbell Medal: Brandon Smith
- Clive Churchill Medal: Ryan Papenhuyzen
- Wally Lewis Medal: Cameron Munster
