= List of Melbourne Storm seasons =

Melbourne Storm is an Australian professional rugby league club based in Melbourne, Australia. The club was formed in 1997 and played their first competitive matches in the 1998 NRL season.

The club has won four premierships since their inception, in 1999, 2012, 2017 and 2020, and have contested several more grand finals. The club also won the 2007 and 2009 NRL Grand Final, but were stripped of these titles due to salary cap breaches.

== NRL ==
Table key
‡	Club finished regular season in first position (J. J. Giltinan Shield)
†	Club finished regular season in last position (wooden spoon)
DNQ	Club did not qualify for finals

Table of yearly win–loss records, with finals results, and key personnel
Season	Club	WCC	Regular season				Finals results			Coach	Captain(s) (Note: Official club captains. For a list of all playing captains see List of Melbourne Storm records)	Ref
Season	Club	WCC	Pos.	W	L	D	Final position	W	L	Coach	Captain(s)	Ref
1998	1998	—N/a	3rd	17	6	1	Lost semi final	1	2	Chris Anderson	Glenn Lazarus	
1999	1999	—N/a	3rd	16	8	0	Premiers	3	1	Chris Anderson	Glenn Lazarus	
2000	2000	Won	6th	14	11	1	Lost qualifying final	0	1	Chris Anderson	Robbie Kearns	
2001	2001	—N/a	9th	11	14	1	DNQ			Chris Anderson → Mark Murray	Robbie Kearns	
2002	2002	—N/a	10th	9	14	1	DNQ			Mark Murray	Robbie Kearns → Rodney Howe	
2003	2003	—N/a	5th	15	9	0	Lost semi final	1	1	Craig Bellamy	Stephen Kearney	
2004	2004	—N/a	6th	13	11	0	Lost semi final	1	1	Craig Bellamy	Stephen Kearney	
2005	2005	—N/a	6th	13	11	0	Lost semi final	1	1	Craig Bellamy	Robbie Kearns	
2006	2006	—N/a	~~1st‡~~ (Note: The club was stripped of all honours between 2006 and 2010 due to a salary cap breach.)	20	4	0	Runners-up	2	1	Craig Bellamy	Rotating captains (Note: The rotating captains throughout the 2006/2007 seasons were: David Kidwell, Scott Hill, Cameron Smith, Matt Geyer, Michael Crocker, Cooper Cronk, Matt King and Dallas Johnson.)	
2007	2007	—N/a	~~1st‡~~	21	3	0	~~Premiers~~	3	0	Craig Bellamy	Rotating captains	
2008	2008	Lost	~~1st‡~~	17	7	0	Runners-up	2	2	Craig Bellamy	Cameron Smith	
2009	2009	—N/a	4th	14	9	1	~~Premiers~~	3	0	Craig Bellamy	Cameron Smith	
2010	2010	Won	16th† (Note: Melbourne were not awarded any points for the 2010 NRL season due to the club's salary cap breach.)	14	10	0	DNQ			Craig Bellamy	Cameron Smith	
2011	2011	—N/a	1st‡	19	5	0	Lost preliminary final	1	1	Craig Bellamy	Cameron Smith	
2012	2012	—N/a	2nd	17	7	0	Premiers	3	0	Craig Bellamy	Cameron Smith	
2013	2013	Won	3rd	16	7	1	Lost semi final	0	2	Craig Bellamy	Cameron Smith	
2014	2014	—N/a	6th	14	10	0	Lost elimination final	0	1	Craig Bellamy	Cameron Smith	
2015	2015	—N/a	4th	14	10	0	Lost preliminary final	1	1	Craig Bellamy	Cameron Smith	
2016	2016	—N/a	1st‡	19	5	0	Runners-up	2	1	Craig Bellamy	Cameron Smith	
2017	2017	—N/a	1st‡	20	4	0	Premiers	3	0	Craig Bellamy	Cameron Smith	
2018	2018	Won	2nd	16	8	0	Runners-up	2	1	Craig Bellamy	Cameron Smith	
2019	2019	—N/a	1st‡	20	4	0	Lost preliminary final	1	2	Craig Bellamy	Cameron Smith	
2020	2020	—N/a	2nd	16	4	0	Premiers	3	0	Craig Bellamy	Cameron Smith	
2021	2021	DNP (Note: Match cancelled due to the COVID-19 pandemic.)	1st‡	21	3	0	Lost preliminary final	1	1	Craig Bellamy	Jesse Bromwich & Dale Finucane	
2022	2022	—N/a	5th	15	9	0	Lost elimination final	0	1	Craig Bellamy	Jesse Bromwich & Christian Welch	
2023	2023	—N/a	3rd	16	8	0	Lost preliminary final	1	2	Craig Bellamy	Christian Welch	
2024	2024	—N/a	1st‡	19	5	0	Runners-up	2	1	Craig Bellamy	Harry Grant	
2025	2025	—N/a	2nd	17	7	0	Runners-up	2	1	Craig Bellamy	Harry Grant	
2026	2026	—N/a	10th	11	13	0	DNQ			Craig Bellamy	Harry Grant	

=== NRL Under-20s ===
Table of yearly win–loss records, with finals results, and key personnel
Season	Club	Regular season				Finals results			Coach	Ref
Season	Club	Pos.	W	L	D	Final position	W	L	Coach	Ref
2008	2008	13th	8	15	1	DNQ			Brad Arthur	
2009	2009	3rd	19	5	0	Premiers	3	0	Brad Arthur	
2010	2010	13th	8	14	2	DNQ			Dean Pay	
2011	2011	4th	16	8	0	Lost semi final	1	1	Dean Pay	
2012	2012	9th	12	10	2	DNQ			Dean Pay	
2013	2013	9th	11	13	0	DNQ			Anthony Seibold	
2014	2014	11th	12	12	0	DNQ			Matt Adamson	
2015	2015	9th	10	13	1	DNQ			Marc Brentnall	
2016	2016	12th	8	14	2	DNQ			Eric Smith	
2017	2017	13th	9	15	0	DNQ			Eric Smith	

== NSW Cup ==
Table of yearly win–loss records, with finals results, and key personnel
Season	Club	Regular season				Finals results			Coach	Ref
Season	Club	Pos.	W	L	D	Final position	W	L	Coach	Ref
2010	2010	7th	11	14	0	Lost elimination final	0	1	Tony Adam	
2026	2026	13th	6	16	0	DNQ			Mark Russell	

== Junior Representatives ==
=== Jersey Flegg Cup ===
Table key
‡	Club finished regular season as minor premiers
#	Competed in the Hastings Deering Colts competition as Victoria Thunderbolts in association with NRL Victoria.
⁑	Competed as Victoria Thunderbolts in association with NRL Victoria.
†	Club finished regular season in last position (wooden spoon)

Table of yearly win–loss records, with finals results, and key personnel
Season	Club	Regular season				Finals results			Coach	Ref
Season	Club	Pos.	W	L	D	Final position	W	L	Coach	Ref
2018#	2018	4th	13	6	0	Lost semi final	1	1	Ben Jack	
2019⁑	2019	12th	3	14	3	DNQ			Ben Jack	
2020⁑	2020	—N/a	0	1	0	Canc.			Ben Jack	
2021⁑	2021	—N/a	1	6	2	Canc.			Ben Jack	
2022⁑	2022	11th	6	16	0	DNQ			Adam Woolnough	
2023	2023	6th	11	11	0	DNQ			Mark Russell	
2024	2024	12th	8	16	0	DNQ			Mark Russell	
2025	2025	1st‡	17	6	1	Premiers	2	0	Mark Russell	
2026	2026	12th	7	13	1	DNQ			Dan Murphy	

=== S.G. Ball Cup ===
Table key
⁑	Competed as Victoria Thunderbolts in association with NRL Victoria.
†	Club finished regular season in last position (wooden spoon)

Table of yearly win–loss records, with finals results, and key personnel
Season	Club	Regular season				Finals results			Coach	Ref
Season	Club	Pos.	W	L	D	Final position	W	L	Coach	Ref
2009	2009	4th	6	3	0	Runners-up	2	1	Kim Williams	
2010	2010	6th	7	2	0	Lost semi final	1	1	Kim Williams	
2011	2011	14th	2	7	0	DNQ			Kim Williams	
2012	2012	13th	2	9	1	DNQ			Kim Williams	
2013	2013	9th	5	4	0	DNQ			Tony Adam	
2014	2014	8th	5	4	0	Lost elimination final	0	1	Tony Adam	
2015	2015	Did not participate								
2016	2016	Did not participate								
2017	2017	Did not participate								
2018	2018	Did not participate								
2019⁑	2019	14th	2	6	0	DNQ			Janan Billings	
2020⁑	2020	—N/a	2	3	0	Susp.			TBC	
2021⁑	2021	12th	1	5	2	DNQ			TBC	
2022⁑	2022	15th†	0	8	0	DNQ			Wayne Adams	
2023	2023	16th†	1	8	0	DNQ			Jason Warr	
2024	2024	13th	2	6	1	DNQ			Ashley Lanfranchi	
2025	2025	8th	5	4	0	Lost semi final	1	1	Matt Duffie	
2026	2026	2nd	7	1	0	Lost semi final	0	2	Matt Duffie	

=== Harold Matthews Cup ===
Table key
†	Club finished regular season in last position (wooden spoon)

Table of yearly win–loss records, with finals results, and key personnel
Season	Club	Regular season				Finals results			Coach	Ref
Season	Club	Pos.	W	L	D	Final position	W	L	Coach	Ref
2024	2024	13th	2	4	1	DNQ			Tony Adam	
2025	2025	17th†	0	7	1	DNQ			Tony Adam	
2026	2026	16th	1	7	0	DNQ			Caine Sinclair	

=== Tarsha Gale Cup ===
Table of yearly win–loss records, with finals results, and key personnel
Season	Club	Regular season				Finals results			Coach	Ref
Season	Club	Pos.	W	L	D	Final position	W	L	Coach	Ref
2026	2026	11th	1	6	1	DNQ			Jack Gould	

=== Lisa Fiaola Cup ===
Table of yearly win–loss records, with finals results, and key personnel
Season	Club	Regular season				Finals results			Coach	Ref
Season	Club	Pos.	W	L	D	Final position	W	L	Coach	Ref
2026	2026	6th	4	3	1	Lost semi final	1	1	Janan Billings	
