= Berala Bears =

Australian rugby league club, based in Berala, NSW

Club information
- Full name: Berala Bears Junior Rugby League Football Club
- Nickname: Bears
- Colours: Yellow; Black
- Founded: 1965; 61 years ago

Current details
- Ground: Peter Hislop Park, Berala
- CEO: Omar Sankari
- Competition: Canterbury Bankstown Rugby League; Sydney Combined Competition

Berala Bears Rugby League Football Club is an Australian rugby league football club based in Berala, New South Wales established in 1965. They conduct teams for both junior, senior and women tag teams. They have had senior teams participate in the Ron Massey Cup.

== Notable juniors ==
- Trevor Reardon (Western Suburbs Magpies& South Sydney Rabbitohs)
- Peter Walsh (Western Suburbs Magpies)
- Stephen Blyth (Western Suburbs Magpies & Newtown Jets)
- Gary Walsh (Western Suburbs Magpies)
- Baide Simpson (North Sydney Bears)
- Alan Neil (Western Suburbs Magpies, St George Dragons, Eastern Suburbs)
- Ron Broderick (Western Suburbs Magpies)
- Tom Arber (Western Suburbs Magpies)
- Brian Cook (Western Suburbs Magpies & Eastern Suburbs)
- Michael Neil (Western Suburbs Magpies, Balmain Tigers)
- Trevor Cogger (Western Suburbs Magpies)
- John Cogger (Western Suburbs Magpies)
- Steve Ewer (Western Suburbs Magpies)
- Tom Robbins (Western Suburbs Magpies)
- Jamie Myers (Western Suburbs Magpies)
- Andrew Simons (North Sydney Bears & Penrith Panthers)
- Terry Donnellan (Western Suburbs Magpies)
- Terry Matterson (Eastern Suburbs, Brisbane Broncos, London Broncos)
- Danny Crnkovich (Parramatta Eels)
- Junior Langi (St George Dragons, Melbourne Storm & Parramatta Eels)
- Anthony Watmough (Manly Sea Eagles & Parramatta Eels)
- Andrew Emelio (Cronulla Sharks & Canterbury Bulldogs)l
- Matt Utai (Canterbury Bulldogs & Wests Tigers)
- Tim Winitana (Canterbury Bulldogs)
- Jamal Idris (Canterbury Bulldogs, Gold Coast Titans, Penrith Panthers & West Tigers)
- Nathan Massey (Canterbury Bulldogs & Canberra Raiders)
- Aidan Sezer (Gold Coast Titans & Canberra Raiders)
- Samisoni Langi (Sydney Roosters)
- Daniel Tupou (Sydney Roosters)
- Apisai Koroisau (South Sydney Rabbitohs, Penrith Panthers & Manly Sea Eagles)
- Tevita Tatola (South Sydney Rabbitohs)
- Haumole Olakau'atu (Manly Sea Eagles)
- Isaac Lumelume (Melbourne Storm)

== See also ==
- List of rugby league clubs in Australia
