= Jahrome Hughes =

New Zealand & NZ Maori international rugby league footballer

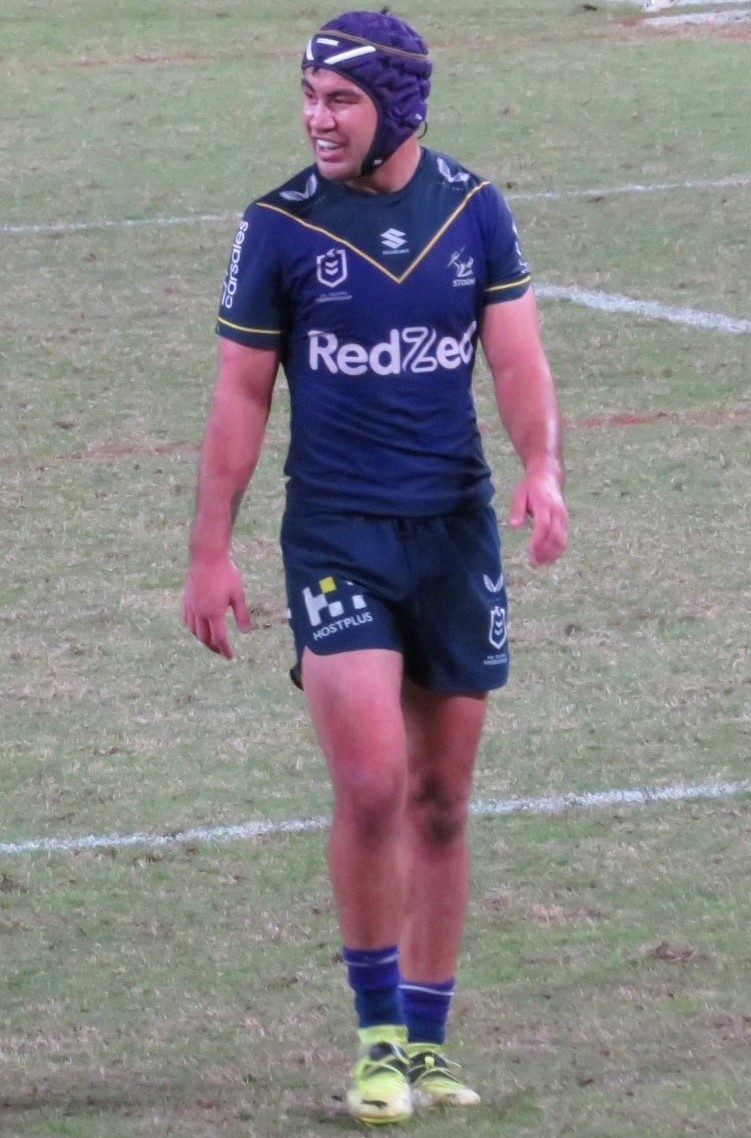

Personal information
- Born: 8 October 1994 (age 32) Wellington, New Zealand
- Height: 183 cm (6 ft 0 in)
- Weight: 90 kg (14 st 2 lb)

Playing information
- Position: Halfback, Fullback
Club
Years	Team	Pld	T	G	FG	P
2013	Gold Coast Titans	1	0	0	0	0
2016	North Qld Cowboys	1	1	0	0	4
2017–	Melbourne Storm	186	72	0	0	288
	Total	188	73	0	0	292
Representative
Years	Team	Pld	T	G	FG	P
2016–17	Queensland Residents	2	1	0	0	4
2019–24	Māori All Stars	3	0	0	0	0
2019–	New Zealand	15	8	0	0	32
- Source: As of 17 November 2026

Jahrome Hughes (born 8 October 1994) is a New Zealand professional rugby league footballer who plays as a halfback for the Melbourne Storm in the National Rugby League, the New Zealand Māori and New Zealand at international level.

He previously played for the Gold Coast Titans as a fullback and the North Queensland Cowboys as a five-eighth in the NRL. He transitioned from fullback to halfback in late 2019, winning the 2020 NRL Grand Final and the 2024 Dally M Medal in that position.

== Early life ==
Hughes was born in Wellington, New Zealand, and is of Māori, and Welsh descent.

He played junior rugby league for the Harbour City Eagles.

In 2008, Hughes moved to the Gold Coast, where he played for the Tugun Seahawks and Currumbin Eagles. He was educated at Palm Beach Currumbin State High School.

== Playing career ==
=== Early career ===
Hughes played for the Sydney Roosters SG Ball Cup team before being signed by the Gold Coast Titans in 2012. He played for the Gold Coast NYC team from 2012 to 2014.

=== 2013–2014: Gold Coast Titans ===
In Round 17 of the 2013 NRL season, Hughes made his NRL debut for the Gold Coast Titans against Penrith at Darwin.

In 2014, he spent the season in the NYC and was released by the Gold Coast at the end of the year.

=== 2015 ===
Hughes joined the new Queensland Cup side, the Townsville Blackhawks. In September, he was named at fullback in the 2015 Queensland Cup Team of the Year. Hughes was named Blackhawks' Best Back and Players' Player.

In October, Hughes signed a one-year contract with North Queensland.

=== 2016: North Queensland Cowboys ===
On 8 May, Hughes represented the Queensland Residents against the New South Wales Residents, playing at fullback and scoring a try in the 16–30 win. In Round 12, Hughes made his North Queensland debut in Wollongong, scoring a try in the 10–14 loss to St. George Illawarra. On 30 June, he signed a two-year contract with Melbourne starting in 2017.

On 3 September, Hughes was named in the Queensland Cup Team of the Year at fullback for the second straight year.

=== 2017–present: Melbourne Storm ===
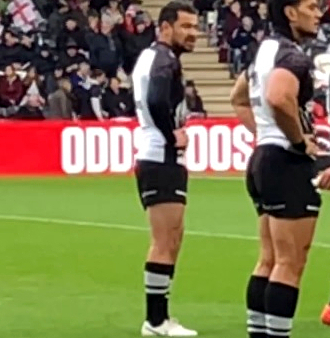
Hughes warming up for the Kiwis in 2018

In round 16 of the 2017 season, Hughes made his Melbourne Storm debut against the Sydney Roosters at Adelaide on 24 June, becoming Melbourne player 184. Hughes earned selection for the New Zealand national rugby league team at the end of the 2018 season, but did not make the run-on team.

After the retirement of Billy Slater and injury to Scott Drinkwater, Hughes began the 2019 season playing fullback. Following consistent performances for the Storm, Hughes made his international debut for New Zealand Kiwis against Tonga. He scored a try on debut and played off the bench.

In round 23, Hughes made the move to halfback to accommodate Ryan Papenhuyzen at fullback at the expense of usual halfback Brodie Croft. Hughes would remain there for the remaining games of the 2019 season, scoring a try in the finals series however the Storm would lose in the preliminary finals to 2018 grand final opponent, the Sydney Roosters in a tight game 14–6.

Hughes would make the permanent move into the halves in 2020 usually partnering Cameron Munster, but occasionally partnering with Cameron Smith. This transition would prove successful with Hughes starting at halfback in Melbourne's 26–20 2020 NRL Grand Final over Penrith.

In 2021, Hughes was awarded the Melbourne Storm Player of the Year award, and was crowned as the 2021 Kiwi Player of the Year. He would also fill in as Melbourne Storm captain for the first time in 2022, re-signing with the club until the end of the 2026 NRL season.

In 2022, Hughes started at halfback for the first time in his fourth test match representing New Zealand Kiwis. Hughes would score the opening try in the Kiwis 26–6 win against Tonga. Hughes played 22 games for Melbourne in the 2023 NRL season as the club finished third on the table. Hughes played in Melbourne's preliminary final loss against Penrith.

=== 2024 ===
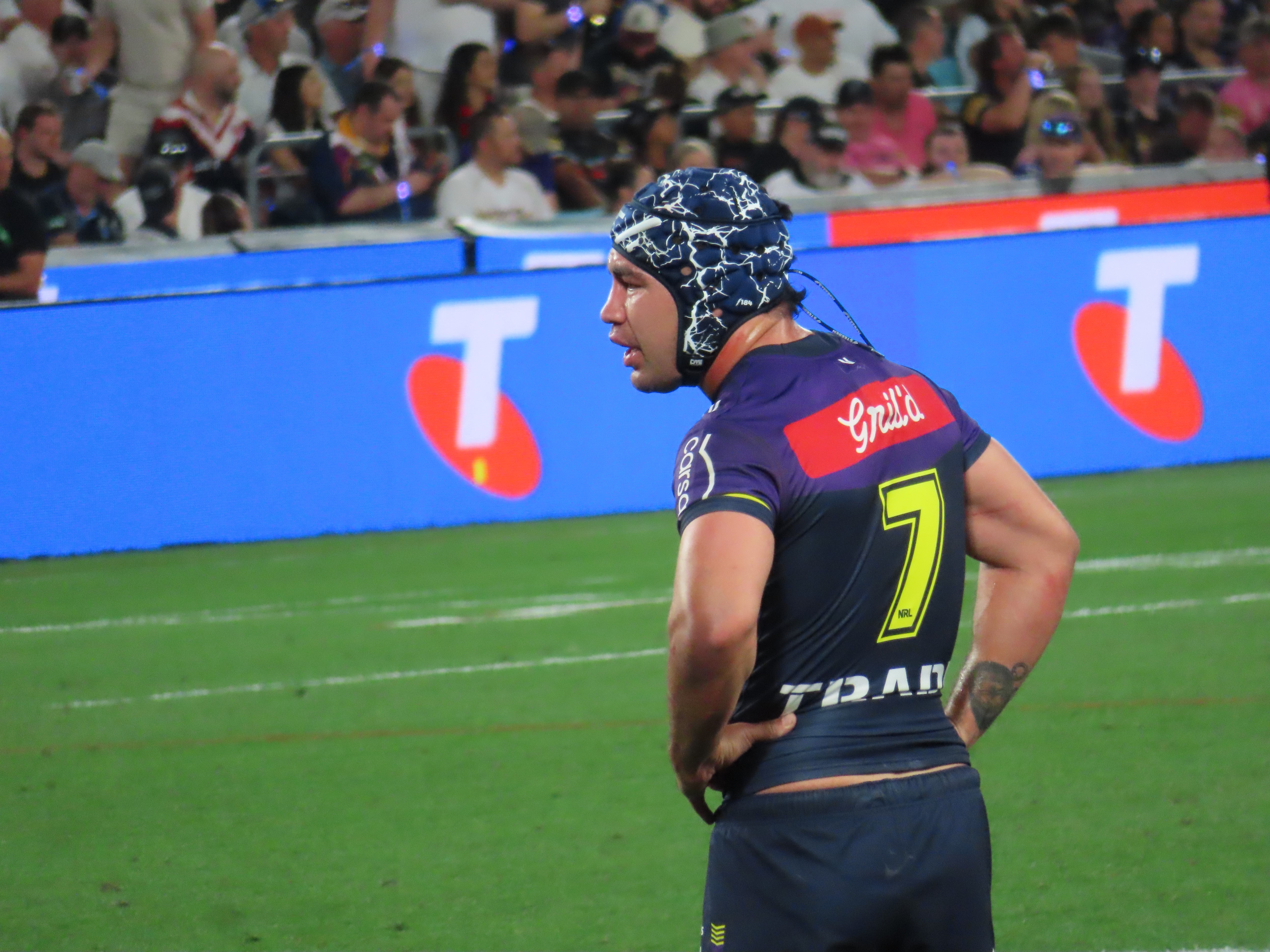
Hughes during the 2024 NRL Grand Final.

Hughes played a total of 23 matches for Melbourne in the 2024 NRL season as the club were runaway minor premiers. Hughes, who had steered the team in the midst of a plethora of player injuries, was awarded the Dally M Medal. Hughes played in Melbourne's 2024 NRL Grand Final loss against Penrith. Hughes would be selected for New Zealand for the 2024 Rugby League Pacific Championships, but had to withdraw from the squad due to injury.

=== 2025 ===
On 29 July, Melbourne announced that Hughes re-signed with the team until the end of 2030. Hughes played 20 games for Melbourne in the 2025 NRL season including their 26-22 2025 NRL Grand Final loss against Brisbane.

=== 2026 ===
Hughes played 18 games for Melbourne in the 2026 NRL season as the club finished 10th on the table, missing the finals for the first time since 2010.

== Honours ==
Individual

- 2× Queensland Cup Team of the Year: 2015, 2016
- Spirit of ANZAC Medal: 2021
- New Zealand International: 2019
- Melbourne Storm Best Back: 2021
- 2× Melbourne Storm Cameron Smith Player of the Year: 2021, 2024
- Dally M Halfback of the Year: 2024
- Dally M Medal: 2024
- RLPA Team of the Year: 2024
- RLPA The Players Champion: 2024

Club

- 2017 NRL Grand Final: Premiers
- 2020 NRL Grand Final: Premiers
- 3× J. J. Giltinan Shield: 2019, 2021, 2024
- 2018 NRL Grand Final: Runners-up
- 2024 NRL Grand Final: Runners-up
- 2025 NRL Grand Final: Runners-up

== Statistics ==
=== NRL ===
.

†	Denotes seasons in which Hughes won an NRL Premiership

Season	Team	Matches	T	G	GK %	F/G	Pts
2013	Gold Coast Titans	1	0	0	–	0	0
2016	North Queensland	1	1	0	–	0	4
2017†	Melbourne	4	3	0	–	0	12
2018	Melbourne	11	2	0	–	0	8
2019	Melbourne	24	9	0	–	0	36
2020†	Melbourne	19	7	0	–	0	28
2021	Melbourne	24	9	0	–	0	20
2022	Melbourne	21	12	0	–	0	48
2023	Melbourne	22	7	0	–	0	28
2024	Melbourne	23	12	0	–	0	48
2025	Melbourne	20	8	0	–	0	32
2026	Melbourne	12	2	0	–	0	12
Career totals		182	72	0	—	0	288
