= Brenko Lee =

Tonga international rugby league footballer (born 1995)

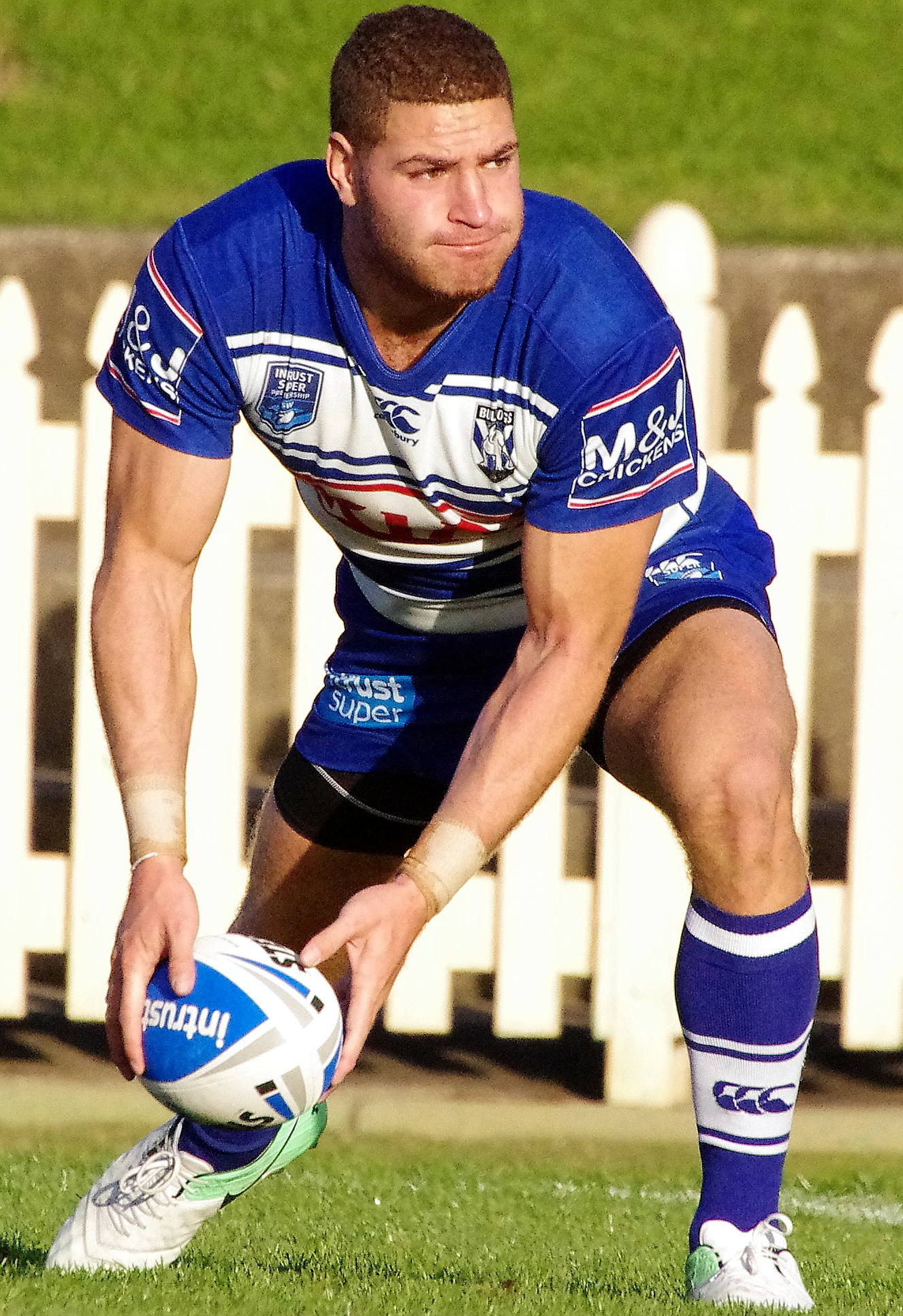

Personal information
- Born: 10 October 1995 (age 31) Brisbane, Queensland, Australia
- Height: 190 cm (6 ft 3 in)
- Weight: 104 kg (16 st 5 lb)

Playing information
- Position: Centre, Wing
Club
Years	Team	Pld	T	G	FG	P
2014–16	Canberra Raiders	15	12	0	0	48
2017	Canterbury Bulldogs	18	3	0	0	12
2018–19	Gold Coast Titans	20	5	0	0	20
2020–21	Melbourne Storm	14	4	0	0	16
2022	Brisbane Broncos	8	1	0	0	4
2023	Dolphins	13	0	0	0	0
	Total	88	25	0	0	100
Representative
Years	Team	Pld	T	G	FG	P
2017	Tonga	1	0	0	0	0
2020	Queensland	1	0	0	0	0
- Source: As of 3 September 2023
- Education: Marsden State High School
- Relatives: Edrick Lee (cousin); Patty Mills (cousin); Nathan Jawai (cousin); Danny Morseu (uncle); Eddie Mabo (great uncle)

Brenko Lee (born 10 October 1995) is a Tonga international rugby league footballer who plays as a centre and winger in the National Rugby League (NRL).

Lee has played for the Dolphins, Brisbane Broncos, Canberra Raiders, Canterbury-Bankstown Bulldogs, Melbourne Storm and the Gold Coast Titans in the NRL. He has played for Queensland in the State of Origin series, and is notable for being undefeated in the series. He is also a NRL premiership winning player of 2020.

== Early life ==
Lee was born in Brisbane, Queensland, Australia. He is of Tongan and Indigenous Australian descent. Lee is the cousin of Redcliffe Dolphins rugby league player Edrick Lee.

Lee attended school at Marsden State High School, Logan City and played his junior rugby league for the Logan Brothers, before being signed by the Canberra Raiders.

== Playing career ==
=== Early career ===
From 2013 to 2015, Lee played for the Canberra Raiders' NYC team. On 20 April 2013, he played for the Queensland under-20s team against the New South Wales under-20s team. On 5 December 2013, he re-signed with the Canberra Raiders on a three-year contract.

=== 2014 ===
On 3 May, Lee again played for the Queensland Under-20s team against the New South Wales under-20s team. In Round 15 of the 2014 NRL season, he made his NRL debut for the Raiders against the Canterbury-Bankstown Bulldogs on the wing in the Raiders' 22–14 loss at Canberra Stadium. In the next round, against the Wests Tigers, he scored his first and second tries in the NRL, in Canberra's 19–18 loss at Leichhardt Oval. After Round 21, after the Raiders' 54–18 loss to New Zealand Warriors at Canberra Stadium, his year was over as he struggled with a hamstring injury. He finished his debut year in the NRL having played in 4 matches and scoring 3 tries.

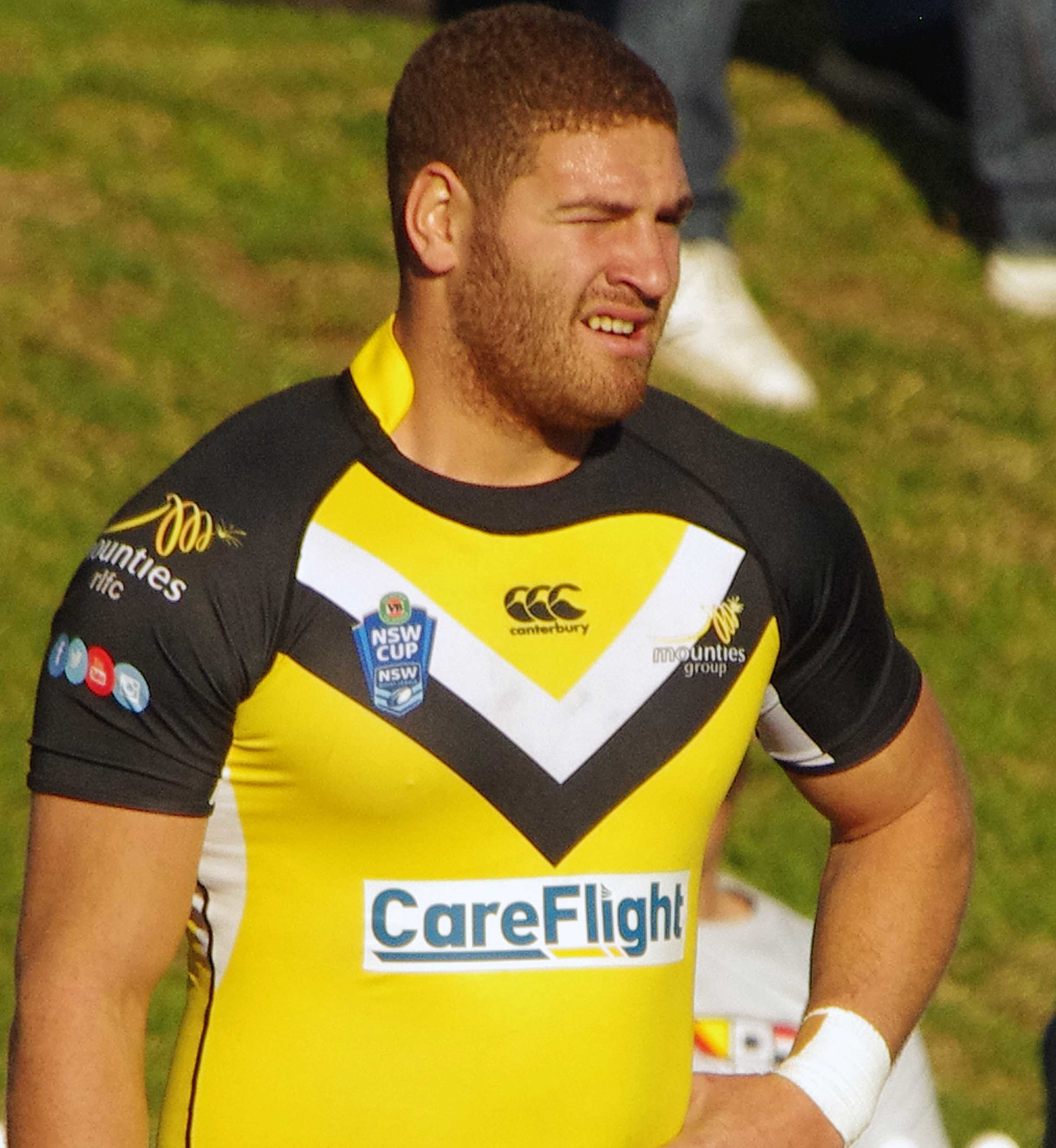
Lee playing for the Mount Pritchard Mounties

=== 2015 ===
On 2 May, Lee played for the Junior Kangaroos against Junior Kiwis. On 11 September, he was named in the 58-man Tonga squad to play the Cook Islands on 17 October.

=== 2017 ===
In October 2016, Lee signed a two-year contract with the Canterbury-Bankstown Bulldogs starting in 2017.

On 3 March 2017, Lee made his debut for the Canterbury-Bankstown Bulldogs against the Melbourne Storm at Belmore Sports Ground.

Lee made his international debut for Mate Ma'a Tonga in the 2017 Pacific Rugby League Tests against Fiji Bati.

In December 2017, Lee signed a one-year contract with the Gold Coast for the 2018 NRL season.

=== 2018 ===
Lee made 14 appearances for the Gold Coast in 2018 and scored 3 tries as the club struggled on the field finishing 14th at the end of the season.

=== 2019 ===
Lee was limited to 6 appearances for the Gold Coast in the 2019 NRL season as the club endured a horror season winning 4 games all year and finished last on the table claiming the wooden spoon.

On 5 December 2019, after failing to be re-signed by the Gold Coast, it was revealed that Lee had signed on with Queensland Cup outfit, the Easts Tigers, for the 2020 season.

=== 2020 ===
Lee signed with the Melbourne Storm and he featured in the 2020 NRL Nines hosted at Perth, Australia.

In round 4 of the 2020 season, Lee made his Melbourne Storm debut against the Rabbitohs at AAMI Park. Lee played centre in the Storm's 2020 NRL Grand Final over the Penrith Panthers in a 26–20 win.

He was selected to play for the Queensland Maroons in the third game of the 2020 State of Origin series, debuting alongside his cousin Edrick Lee in a series-clinching victory.

=== 2021 ===
On 28 May 2021, Lee signed a two-year contract to join the Brisbane Broncos to start in 2022. Restricted by injuries, Lee only made four appearances for Brisbane Tigers in the 2021 Queensland Cup, not making it back to the Broncos squad.

=== 2022 ===
In June, Lee signed a two-year deal to join the newly admitted Dolphins (NRL) team ahead of the 2023 NRL season.

=== 2023 ===
In round 1 of the 2023 NRL season, Lee made his club debut for the Dolphins in their inaugural game in the national competition, defeating the Sydney Roosters 28–18 at Suncorp Stadium. At the end of the season, Lee's departure from the club was announced.
