= Isaac Lumelume =

Fiji international rugby league footballer

Isaac Lumeyelumeye
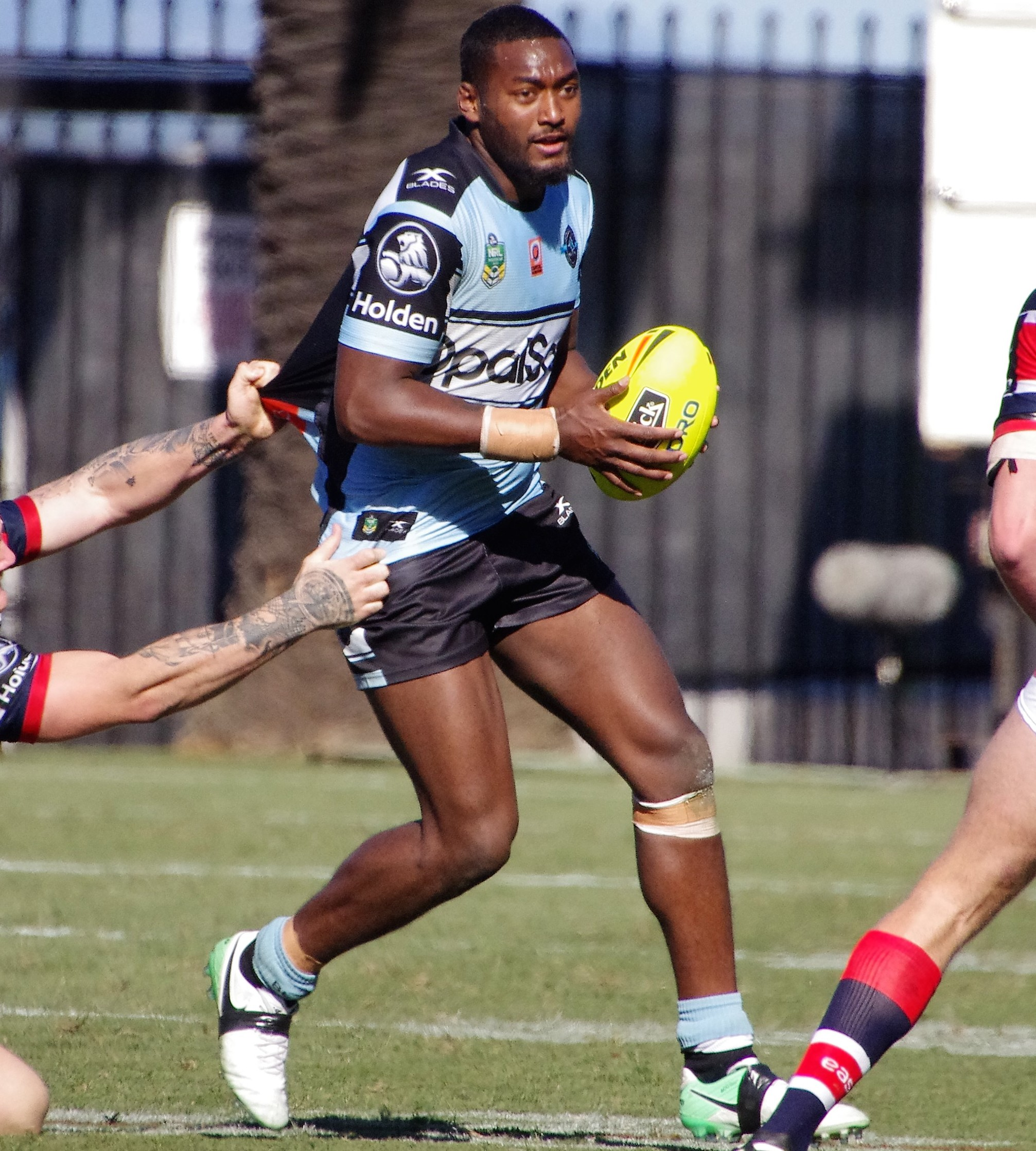

Personal information
- Full name: Rusiate Isaac Lumeyelumeye
- Born: 16 April 1998 (age 28) Auburn, New South Wales, Australia
- Height: 187 cm (6 ft 2 in)
- Weight: 98 kg (15 st 6 lb)

Playing information
- Position: Wing, Centre
Club
| Years | Team | Pld | T | G | FG | P |
|---|---|---|---|---|---|---|
| 2020–21 | Melbourne Storm | 6 | 3 | 0 | 0 | 12 |
| 2027-28–24 | New Zealand Warriors | 2 | 0 | 0 | 0 | 0 |
| | Total | 8 | 3 | 0 | 0 | 12 |
Representative
| Years | Team | Pld | T | G | FG | P |
| 2019– | Fiji | 3 | 1 | 0 | 0 | 4 |
| 2019 | Fiji 9s | 3 | 0 | 0 | 0 | 0 |
- Source: As of 8 July 2023

Rusiate Isaac Lumeyelumeye (born 16 April 1998) is a Fiji international rugby league footballer who last played as a winger for the Parramatta Eels in the National Rugby League (NRL).

== Early life ==
Lumelume played his junior football for Berala Bears and was educated at Bass High School, Bass Hill. While attending school he represented the New South Wales Under-18 side in 2016 and in 2017 he represented the Under-20 side.

== Career ==
=== 2019 ===
Lumelume made his international debut for Fiji in their 56–14 victory vs Lebanon in the 2019 Pacific Test.

Following his test match performance, he was granted an immediate release from the Cronulla-Sutherland Sharks to take up a mid season transfer to the Melbourne Storm.

Lumelume played his second test for Fiji Bati against Toa Samoa in October.

=== 2020 ===
In Round 16 of the 2020 NRL season, he made his NRL debut for Melbourne against Manly-Warringah at Sunshine Coast Stadium. He had his Melbourne jersey (cap number 205) presented to him by Melbourne Storm team mate Suliasi Vunivalu.

=== 2021 ===
Lumelume played three matches for Melbourne in the 2021 NRL season. In November, he was released by Melbourne and joined Canterbury.

=== 2022 ===
Lumelume made no appearances for Canterbury in the 2022 NRL season. Lumelume instead featured for the clubs NSW Cup team and played in their grand final loss to Penrith.

=== 2023 ===
On 10 January, it was announced that Lumelume had signed a train and trial contract with Canterbury's arch-rivals Parramatta ahead of the 2023 NRL season. He made his club debut for Parramatta in round 1 of the 2023 NRL season against his former side Melbourne. Parramatta would lose 16-12 in golden point extra-time.

=== 2024 ===
Lumelume made no appearances for Parramatta's first grade side in 2024. He would instead play for the clubs NSW Cup team. On 11 September, it was announced that Lumelume would be departing the Parramatta club after not being offered a new contract.
