= Aaron Pene =

Australian rugby league footballer

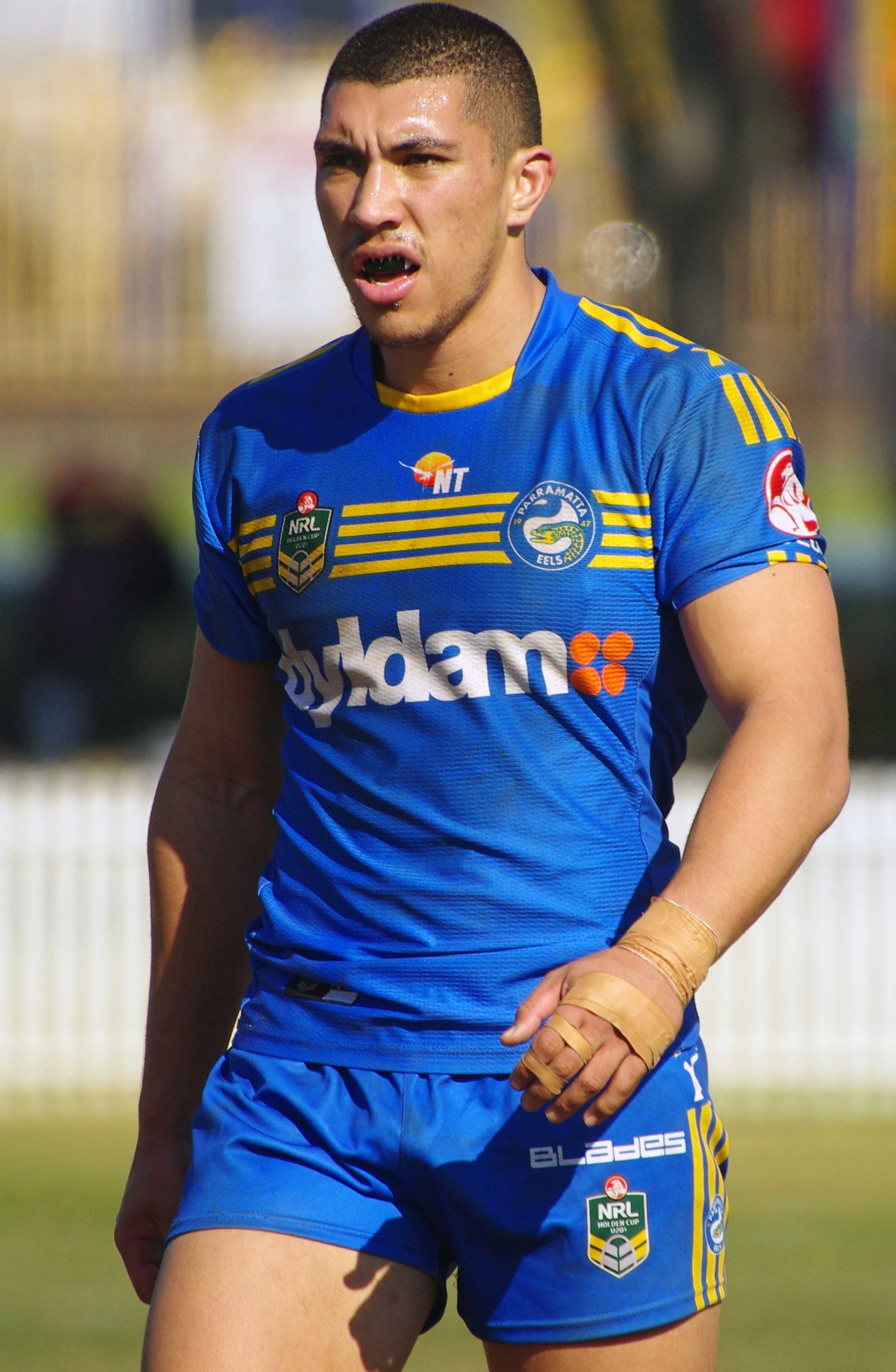

Personal information
- Born: 26 September 1995 (age 31) Sydney, New South Wales, Australia
- Height: 6 ft 3 in (1.90 m)
- Weight: 16 st 12 lb (107 kg)

Playing information
- Position: Prop
Club
Years	Team	Pld	T	G	FG	P
2020–21	Melbourne Storm	10	0	0	0	0
2022	New Zealand Warriors	14	0	0	0	0
2023	Melbourne Storm	8	0	0	0	0
2024–26	Leigh Leopards	25	3	0	0	12
	Total	57	3	0	0	12
- Source: As of 18 November 2026

Aaron Pene (born 26 September 1995) is an Australian professional rugby league footballer who last played as a prop for the Leigh Leopards in the Super League.

He previously played for the New Zealand Warriors and Melbourne Storm in the National Rugby League (NRL).

== Background Early life ==
Pene is of German and Samoan heritage. Pene played his junior rugby league for Berala Bears and Chester Hill Hornets, before being signed by the Canterbury-Bankstown Bulldogs.

He played in the NRL Under-20s for Parramatta Eels in 2015, and Wentworthville Magpies in 2017. He injured his knee at the end of 2017 after signing a trial contract with Newtown Jets.

== Career ==
=== Melbourne Storm: 2019-2021 ===
While playing for the Central Queensland Capras in the 2019 Queensland Cup competition, Pene signed with Melbourne Storm in June 2019, moving to play for Storm feeder club Brisbane Tigers. Promoted to the club's top 30 for the 2020 season, Pene made his debut in round 20 of the 2020 NRL season for the Melbourne Storm against St. George Illawarra, in a 30–22 loss at Netstrata Jubilee Stadium.

=== New Zealand Warriors: 2022 ===
On 8 June 2021, the New Zealand Warriors announced that Pene would be joining them on a two-year contract starting 2022. Pene would appear in 14 matches for the Warriors, also making appearances for Redcliffe Dolphins in the Queensland Cup competition. He was granted an early release from his contract by the club in October.

=== Melbourne Storm: 2023–2024 ===
Pene rejoined the Melbourne Storm in October 2022, signing a two-year contract to return to where he made his NRL debut in 2020. Pene only played eight matches for Melbourne in the 2023 NRL season as the club finished third on the table.

He was released from his contract with Melbourne during the 2024 NRL season to take up an opportunity in the Super League.

=== Leigh Leopards ===
On 3 August 2026 it was reported that Leigh Leopards had released him with immediate effect
