= Tom Arber =

Australian rugby league footballer

Personal information
- Full name: Thomas Arber
- Born: 21 May 1958 (age 68)

Playing information
- Position: Prop
Club
Years	Team	Pld	T	G	FG	P
1980–82	Western Suburbs	46	3	0	0	9
1983–84	Eastern Suburbs	29	0	0	0	0
	Total	75	3	0	0	9
- Source: As of 3 January 2023

Tom Arber is an Australian former professional rugby league footballer who played in the 1980s. He played for Eastern Suburbs and Western Suburbs in the NSWRL competition.

== Playing career ==
Arber made his first grade debut for Western Suburbs in round 10 of the 1980 NSWRL season against South Sydney at Redfern Oval. Arber made 16 appearances in his first season at the club as they reached the preliminary final against Eastern Suburbs. It would be a day to forget for Wests though as they were defeated 41–5 at the Sydney Cricket Ground. The match would also be the last time Western Suburbs would reach a preliminary final in their history. Arber played two further seasons with Wests before switching to Eastern Suburbs where he played 29 games for the club.
