= Trent Loiero =

Australian rugby league footballer

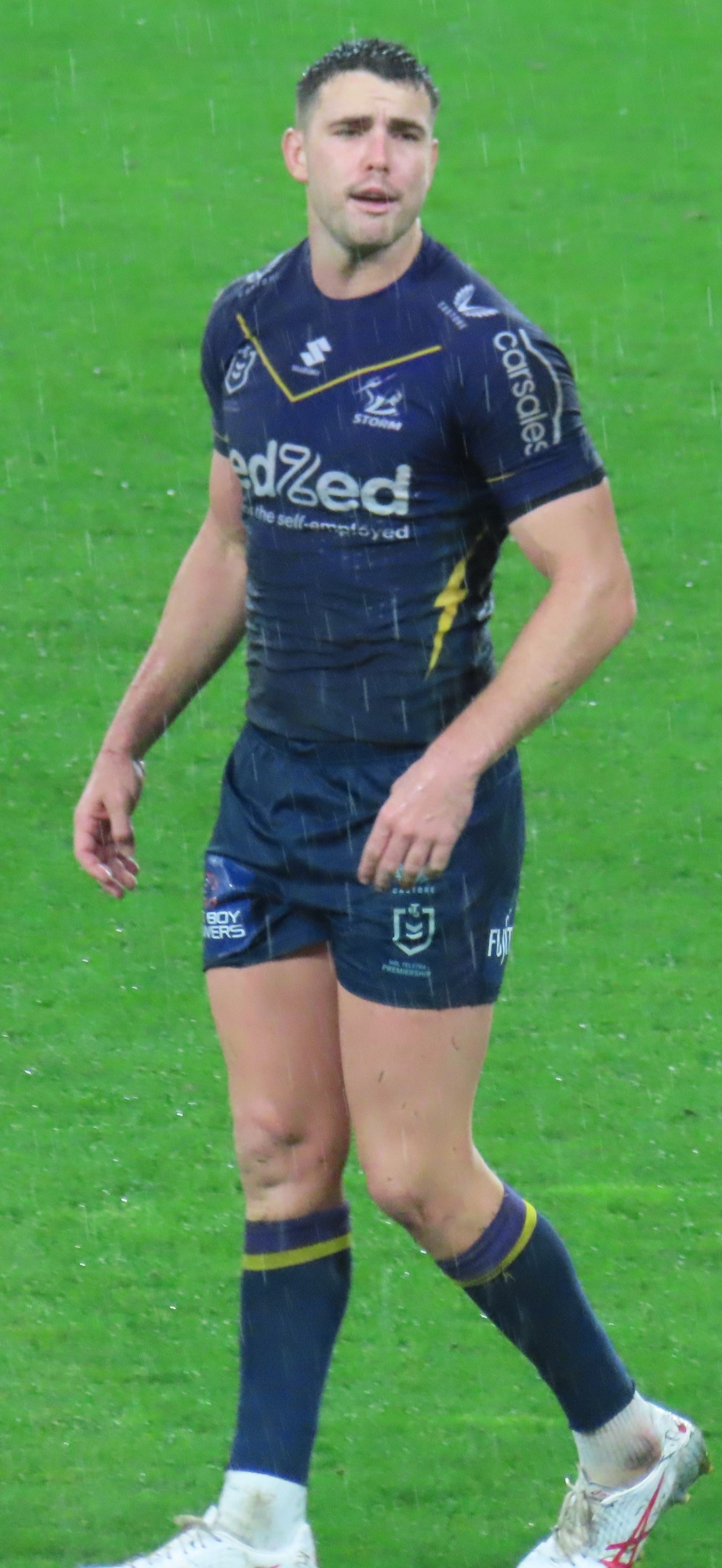

Personal information
- Born: 27 February 2001 (age 25) Nambour, Queensland, Australia
- Height: 192 cm (6 ft 4 in)
- Weight: 104 kg (16 st 5 lb)

Playing information
- Position: Lock, Second-row
Club
Years	Team	Pld	T	G	FG	P
2021–	Melbourne Storm	121	12	0	0	48
Representative
Years	Team	Pld	T	G	FG	P
2025–26	Queensland	6	1	0	0	4
- Source: As of 6 November 2026

Trent Loiero (born 27 February 2001) is an Australian professional rugby league footballer who plays as a lock and second-row forward for the Melbourne Storm in the National Rugby League (NRL).

== Background ==
Loiero played his junior rugby league for the Kawana Dolphins and attended Mountain Creek State High School, Sunshine Coast before being signed by the Melbourne Storm. Loiero is of Italian descent.

== Playing career ==
=== Early career ===
In 2018 and 2019, Loiero played for the Sunshine Coast Falcons Mal Meninga Cup and Hastings Deering Colts sides. On 5 June 2019, he played for Queensland under-18 in their 34–12 win over New South Wales. Later in 2019, he made his Queensland Cup debut for the Falcons. On 20 September 2019, he scored a try for the Falcons in their Hastings Deering Colts Grand Final win over the Wynnum Manly Seagulls.

=== Melbourne Storm ===
In February 2020, Loiero played for the Melbourne Storm at the 2020 NRL Nines in Perth, and in the Storm's pre-season trial against the New Zealand Warriors in Palmerston North.

In Round 4 of the 2021 NRL season, Loiero made his NRL debut for Melbourne against the Brisbane Broncos. He had his debut jersey (cap 212) presented to him by Ryan Hinchcliffe. He would score his first NRL try in his second match against the Canberra Raiders.

Loiero continued to develop through the season, making six NRL appearances, with the Queenslander upgraded to the club's top-30 squad.

Loiero made 17 appearances for Melbourne during the 2022 season, making an impact from the interchange bench. He scored two tries for the season, and signed a contract extension until the end of the 2025 season.

=== 2023 ===
In 2023, Loiero earnt a starting role for Melbourne following the departures of a number of forwards to the Dolphins. Loiero played 26 games for Melbourne in the 2023 NRL season as the club finished third on the table. Loiero played in Melbourne's preliminary final loss against Penrith.

=== 2024 ===
Loiero played a total of 26 matches for Melbourne in the 2024 NRL season. He played in Melbourne's 2024 NRL Grand Final loss against Penrith. On 18 December, the Melbourne outfit announced that Loiero had re-signed with the club until the end of 2028.

=== 2025 ===
On 19 May, Loiero was selected to officially make his origin debut on 28 May 2025, coming off the bench. He had previously been selected in the 2024 game 2 extended squad. Loiero played 25 games for Melbourne in the 2025 NRL season including their 26-22 2025 NRL Grand Final loss against Brisbane. Loiero was sin binned in the final two minutes of the match for an illegal shoulder charge.

=== 2026 ===
Loiero played 21 matches for Melbourne in the 2026 NRL season as the club finished 10th on the table, missing the finals for the first time since 2010.

== Statistics ==
Year	Team	Games	Tries	Pts
2021	Melbourne Storm	6	2	8
2022	Melbourne Storm	17	2	8
2023	Melbourne Storm	26	2	8
2024	Melbourne Storm	26		
2025	Melbourne Storm	25	4	16
2026	Melbourne Storm			
	Totals	100	10	40
