= Aaron Booth (rugby league) =

Australian rugby league player

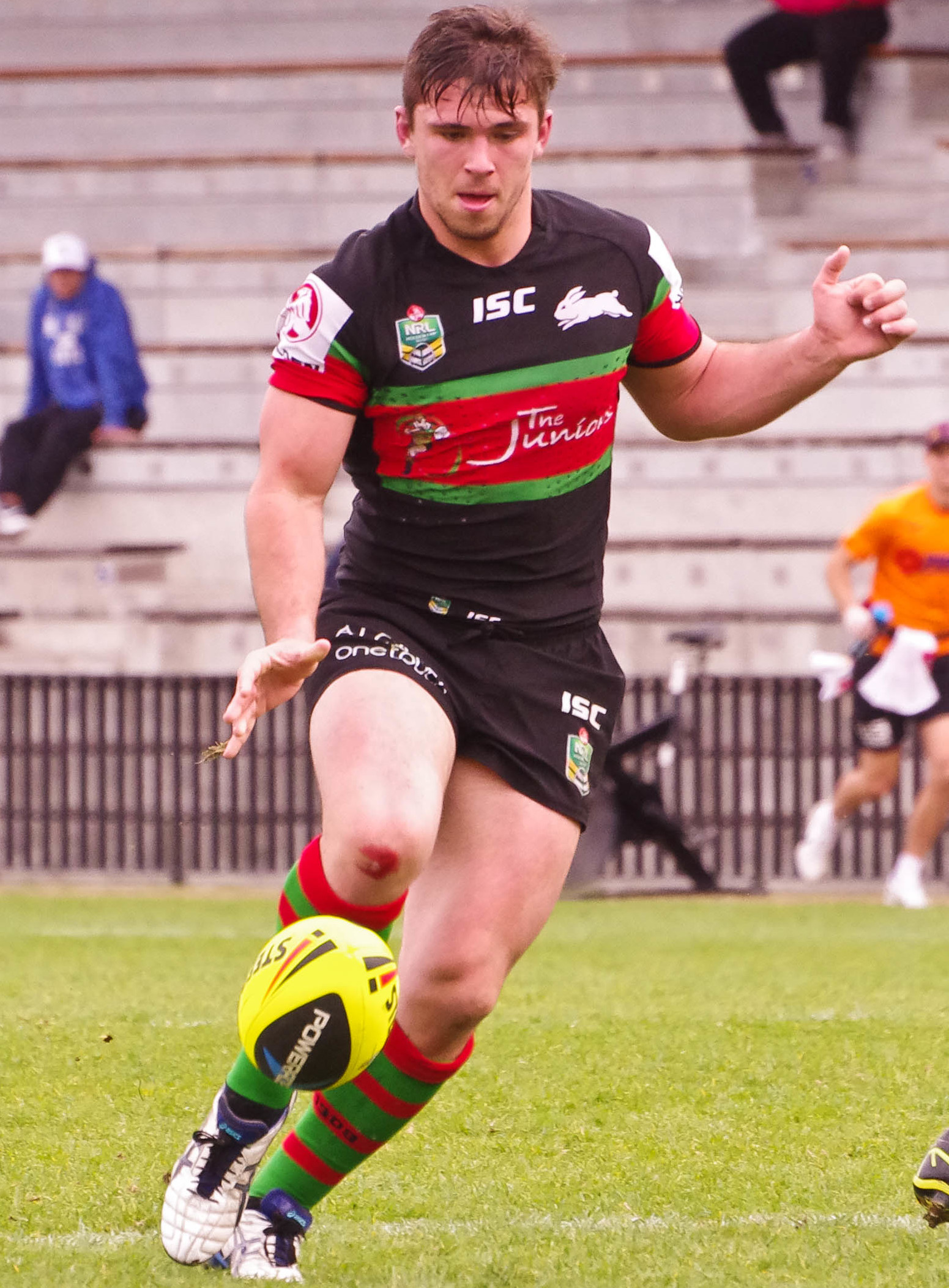

Personal information
- Born: 1 October 1995 (age 29); Sydney, New South Wales, Australia

Playing information
- Height: 178 cm (5 ft 10 in)
- Weight: 85 kg (13 st 5 lb)
- Position: Hooker
Club
Years	Team	Pld	T	G	FG	P
2020–21	Melbourne Storm	6	0	0	0	0
2022	Gold Coast Titans	4	0	0	0	0
	Total	10	0	0	0	0

Aaron Booth (born 1 October 1995) is an Australian former professional rugby league footballer who last played as a hooker for the Gold Coast Titans in the NRL, and is currently an assistant coach of their NRLW side.

He previously played for the Melbourne Storm in the National Rugby League.

== Background ==
Born in Sydney, Booth was raised in Brunswick Heads and played his junior rugby league for the Mullumbimby Giants.

He attended Palm Beach Currumbin State High School before being signed by the South Sydney Rabbitohs.

== Playing career ==
In 2011, Booth played for Gold Coast Green in the Cyril Connell Cup. In 2012, he played for Gold Coast Green in the Mal Meninga Cup and later for Gold Coast White in 2013.

In 2014, Booth joined the Rabbitohs' Under-20 side, playing for 40 games for them over two seasons. In 2016, he played for the North Sydney Bears, the Rabbitohs' New South Wales Cup feeder club.

In 2017, Booth joined the Mackay Cutters in the Queensland Cup. He missed the entire 2018 season after tearing his ACL in pre-season training.

In 2019, Booth signed with the Easts Tigers, a feeder club for the Melbourne Storm. In November 2019, he joined Melbourne's NRL squad for pre-season training, earning a contract with the club.

=== Melbourne Storm: 2020–21 ===
In Round 20 of the 2020 NRL season, Booth made his NRL debut for the Melbourne Storm against St. George Illawarra Dragons. He had his Melbourne jersey (cap number 208) presented to him by Melbourne Storm captain Cameron Smith.

=== Gold Coast Titans: 2022–23 ===
In August 2021 the Gold Coast Titans added Booth to their squad for 2022, with coach Justin Holbrook saying "Aaron is a local (Gold Coast) boy and it’s great that he is coming back to represent the region."

While with the Titans during the 2022 NRL season, Booth also played with Burleigh Bears in the 2022 Queensland Cup.

Booth made his Gold Coast debut in round 18 of the 2022 NRL season, starting at hooker against the Brisbane Broncos. He suffered a serious knee injury playing against Melbourne in round 21, with surgery required to repair a multi-ligament injury.

== Post playing ==
On August 3 2023, the Titans announced that Booth would be retiring due to injury, effective immediately, but would remain at the club in an administrative role while continuing his duties as assistant coach of the Titans' NRLW team. On 8 January 2025, it was announced that Booth would again take up the role as assistant coach for the 2025 NRLW season.
