= 2020 NRL Grand Final =

Premiership-deciding game of the 2020 NRL season

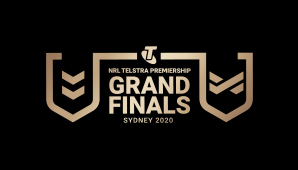

Penrith Panthers	Melbourne Storm
20	26
	1	2	Total
PEN	0	20	20
MEL	22	4	26
- Date: 25 October 2020 (Note: The match was postponed from its original scheduled date of October 4 as a result of the suspension and delayed resumption of the 2020 season due to the impact of the COVID-19 pandemic in Australia.)
- Stadium: ANZ Stadium
- Location: Sydney, New South Wales, Australia
- Clive Churchill Medal: Ryan Papenhuyzen
- National anthem: Chloé Zuel
- Referees: Gerard Sutton, Todd Smith (Touch Judge); Chris Butler (Touch Judge)
- Attendance: 37,303

Broadcast partners
- Broadcasters: Nine Network (Live) Fox League (Delayed)
- Commentators: Ray Warren; Phil Gould; Andrew Johns; Brad Fittler

The 2020 NRL Grand Final was the conclusive and premiership-deciding game of the 2020 National Rugby League season held at Sydney's ANZ Stadium on October 25. The match was contested between minor premiers Penrith Panthers and second-placed Melbourne Storm. Melbourne led the game 22–0 at half-time before holding off a late Penrith comeback to win 26–20, claiming their fourth premiership title. Melbourne fullback Ryan Papenhuyzen was awarded the Clive Churchill Medal as the official man of the match. The match was attended by 37,303 spectators due to an enforced limit to stadium capacity by the NSW government as a result of the COVID-19 pandemic in Australia. The game would be the last for Melbourne hooker and captain Cameron Smith after announcing his retirement in the following year, making him the most-capped player in the NRL with 430 games, and the most for a single club.

The match was preceded by the 2020 NRL Women's Premiership Grand Final, where the Brisbane Broncos defeated the Sydney Roosters 20–10 to win their third premiership title in succession, and their second Grand Final win against the Roosters after the teams met in the inaugural NRLW Grand Final in 2018.

Pre-match entertainment was headlined by Australian indie pop singer Amy Shark. The match was broadcast live throughout Australia by the Nine Network.

== Background ==
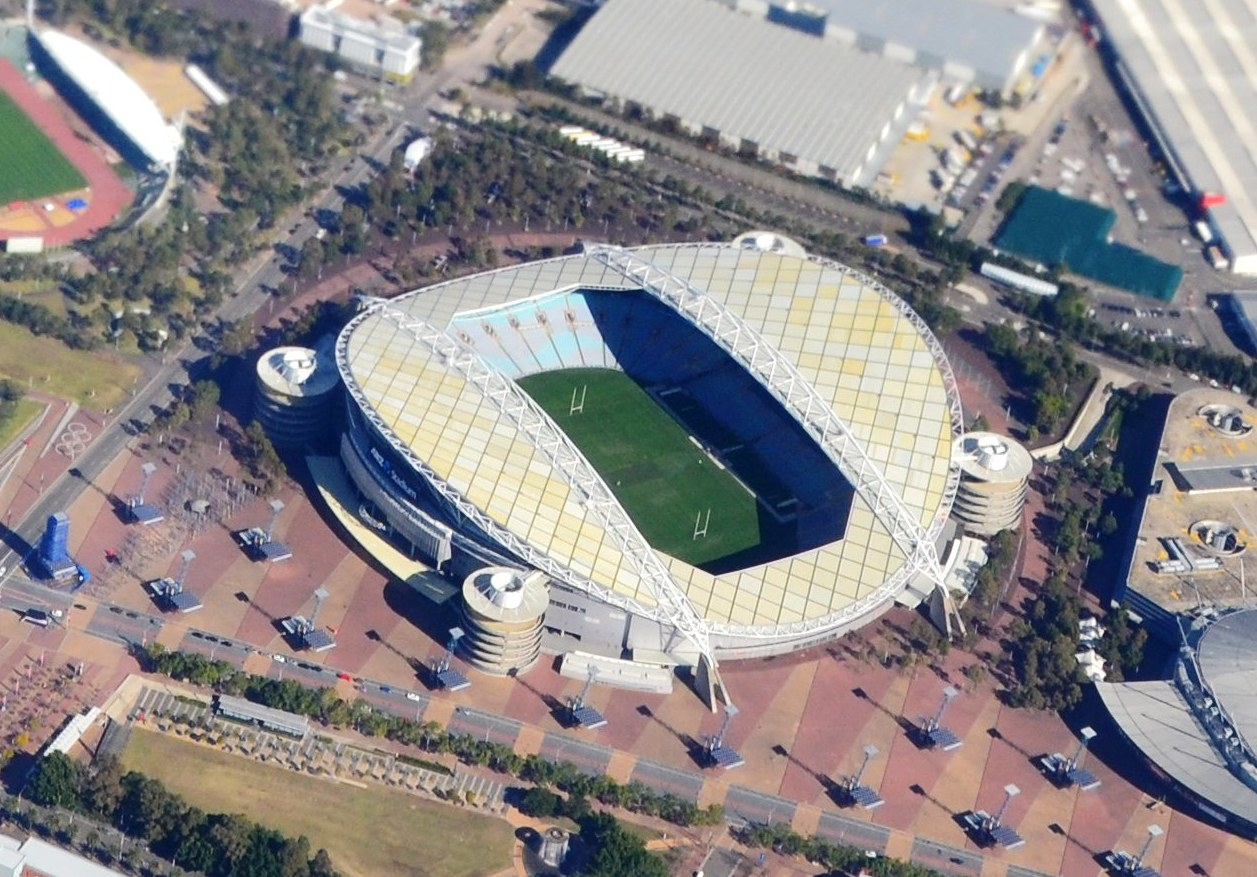
ANZ Stadium in Sydney where the match was played

It was the first time the Penrith Panthers and the Melbourne Storm met in an NRL Grand Final, and in a finals match in general. The Penrith side were awarded the minor premiership for the third time in the club's history, and were aiming to secure a third premiership; the Panthers having secured both titles in 1991 and 2003. It was Ivan Cleary's second Grand Final appearance as a coach, having led the New Zealand Warriors to a 10–24 loss against Manly-Warringah Sea Eagles in 2011. It was the Storm's fourth Grand Final appearance in five years, winning the 2017 premiership and runners-up in 2016 and 2018.

Penrith and Melbourne finished first and second respectively on the regular season ladder. The two sides previously met at Campbelltown Stadium in round 6, with the Penrith side defeating Melbourne 21–14. As a result of restrictions imposed by the Victorian Government in response to the COVID-19 pandemic in Australia, Melbourne were forced to play the remainder of the season outside their home state, with the club winning their home games at Kogarah Oval and Suncorp Stadium, before playing their remaining six home games at Sunshine Coast Stadium, which all resulted in wins. Both sides won their respective Qualifying Finals: the Penrith side narrowly defeated the reigning premiers Sydney Roosters 29–28 at Panthers Stadium, and the Storm beating Parramatta Eels 36–24 at Suncorp Stadium. In the subsequent Preliminary Finals, Melbourne would go on to defeat 2019 runners-up Canberra Raiders 30–10 at Suncorp Stadium, with the Penrith side defeating the South Sydney Rabbitohs 20–16 at ANZ Stadium.

== Pre-match ==
=== Broadcasting ===
The match was broadcast live on the Nine Network and delayed on Fox League in Australia and Sky Sport in New Zealand. Radio broadcasters include ABC, Triple M, 2GB, SEN and Koori Radio.

=== Curtain-raiser matches ===
Curtain-raiser matches on the day will include two matches

=== Entertainment ===
Game-day entertainment will be headlined by Australian indie pop singer Amy Shark.

== Teams ==
Penrith Panthers	Position	Melbourne Storm
Dylan Edwards	Fullback	Ryan Papenhuyzen
Josh Mansour	Wing	Suliasi Vunivalu
Stephen Crichton	Centre	Justin Olam
Tyrone May	Centre	Brenko Lee
Brian To'o	Wing	Josh Addo-Carr
Jarome Luai	Five-eighth	Cameron Munster
Nathan Cleary	Halfback	Jahrome Hughes
James Tamou (c)	Prop	Jesse Bromwich
Apisai Koroisau	Hooker	Cameron Smith (c)
James Fisher-Harris	Prop	Christian Welch
Viliame Kikau	2nd Row	Felise Kaufusi
Liam Martin	2nd Row	Kenny Bromwich
Isaah Yeo	Lock	Nelson Asofa-Solomona
Brent Naden	Interchange	Brandon Smith
Kurt Capewell	Interchange	Tino Fa'asuamaleaui
Moses Leota	Interchange	Dale Finucane
Zane Tetevano	Interchange	Nicho Hynes
Ivan Cleary	Coach	Craig Bellamy

James Tamou, Apisai Koroisau, and Zane Tetevano were the only players in the Penrith line-up to have had previous NRL grand final experience after winning premiership titles for the North Queensland Cowboys in 2015, South Sydney Rabbitohs in 2014, and Sydney Roosters in 2018 respectively. Halfback Nathan Cleary played his 100th first-grade match. Ryan Papenhuyzen, Brenko Lee, Justin Olam, Jahrome Hughes, and Tino Fa'asuamaleaui were the only Melbourne players to make their NRL grand final debut, (Note: Nicho Hynes was named on the interchange bench but never took the field and is thus not credited with a game by the NRL) while Cameron Smith, Suliasi Vunivalu, Cameron Munster, Jesse Bromwich, Kenny Bromwich, and Dale Finucane played in each of the Storm's last three grand final appearances. Only Cameron Smith and Jesse Bromwich have played in further grand finals for Melbourne.

=== Officials ===
Position			Stand-By
Referees:	Gerard Sutton		Ashley Klein
Touch Judges:	Chris Butler	Todd Smith	David Munro
Bunker:	Steve Chiddy		Source:

== Match summary ==
2020 NRL Grand Final

Sunday, 25 October
19:40 AEDT (UTC+11)

Penrith Panthers	20 – 26	Melbourne Storm
Tries: 4 To'o 52'; Crichton 68'; Mansour 71'; Cleary 79'; Goals: 2 Cleary 53', 69' (2/3)	1st: 0–22; 2nd: 20–4; Report	Tries: 4 Olam (penalty) 3'; Vunivalu 30'; C. Smith 39'; Papenhuzen 45'; Goals: 5 C. Smith 4', pen 22', pen 26', 31', 40' (5/6); Sin bin: Hughes (yellow card) 70' to 80'; B. Smith (yellow card) 79' to 80'

ANZ Stadium, Sydney
Attendance: 37,303
Referee: Gerard Sutton
Touch judges: Chris Butler, Todd Smith
Clive Churchill Medal: Ryan Papenhuyzen (Melbourne)

=== First half ===
The first points came when Melbourne's Justin Olam attempted to score in the fourth minute. The referee ruled "no try", but a video review showed that Penrith's Tyrone May had kicked the ball out and ordered a penalty try. Cameron Smith converted. In the seventh minute Josh Mansour appeared to have scored for the Penrith side, but it was disallowed for a Stephen Crichton obstruction. Penrith made errors twice and Smith took advantage with two penalty goals. Later Nathan Cleary misdirected a pass which Suliasi Vunivalu intercepted, running 80 meters for a length of field try. With a minute remaining, Smith scored his first grand final try, right under the goal posts. It was initially called "no try", until replays showed Apisai Koroisau knocking the ball from his hands. Smith converted and the half finished 22–0 in favour of Melbourne.

=== Second half ===
Five minutes into the second half, Ryan Papenhuyzen ran 70 metres to score from a scrum, this turned out to be Melbourne's last points for the night. When all looked lost for the Penrith side, Isaah Yeo ran behind his teammate then kicked the ball and Brian To'o scored in the corner in the 53rd minute. The video referee controversially awarded the try, which likely would have been called for obstruction had any Storm players been attempting a tackle; as there was no attempt to tackle, the try stood. In the 67th minute Papenhuyzen leapt over the touchline to knock a Penrith penalty kick back into play. Two minutes later, Luai passed to Stephen Crichton, who scored, bringing the score to 12–26. In the 71st minute, Viliame Kikau ran into Jahrome Hughes in an attempt to chase the ball and score a try. The video referee ruled a professional foul and Hughes was sent to the sin-bin. Two minutes later, Jarome Luai threw a long ball to Josh Mansour who scored bringing the scores to 16–26 with seven minutes left. Nathan Cleary missed the conversion. With just over a minute left in the match Brandon Smith was sinbinned for a professional foul, reducing Melbourne's men to 11, Penrith took advantage and scored with a fast try to Cleary. With the clock ticking down and about 20 seconds remaining, Cleary declined the conversion, knowing that this move would give Penrith extra time to try to draw level on the last play. If he elected to attempt the conversion, the remaining time on the clock would have elapsed. Shortly after the kick-off, the siren sounded, and with the ball still live, Penrith players passed desperately, but it was eventually intercepted by Melbourne Storm's Felise Kaufusi, ending the game.

Ryan Papenhuyzen was judged best on field, winning his first Clive Churchill Medal. This is only the 2nd ever Grand Final in which 20 or more points were scored in both halves, the first being the 2001 NRL Grand Final. On both occasions the side which ultimately won had established a score of greater than 20 points to 0 in the first half and held on against a 20 or more points comeback by the opposition in the second half.

== NRL Women's Premiership Grand Final ==
The 2020 NRL Women's Premiership Grand Final was the culmination of the 2020 NRL Women's season.

Sunday, 25 October
4:05 pm (AEDT)

Brisbane Broncos	20 – 10	Sydney Roosters
Tries: Tamika Upton (3') 1 Amber Hall (8') 1 Chelsea Lenarduzzi (34') 1 Tallisha Harden (44') 1 Goals: Meg Ward 2/4 (5', 9')	1st: 12 – 10; 2nd: 8 – 0	Tries: 1 (13') Yasmin Meakes; 1 (25') Quincy Dodd; Goals: 1/2 Zahara Temara (26')

ANZ Stadium
Referee: Belinda Sharpe
Player of the Match: Amber Hall (Karyn Murphy Medal)
