= 2022 Melbourne Storm season =

NRL rugby league season

- NRL Rank: 5th
- Play-off result: Lost Elimination final
- 2022 record: Wins: 15; draws: 0; losses: 9
- Points scored: For: 657; against: 410

Team information
- CEO: Justin Rodski
- Coach: Craig Bellamy
- Captain: Jesse Bromwich (23 games) Christian Welch (1 game) Jahrome Hughes (1 game)
- Stadium: AAMI Park – 30,050 (11 games); Suncorp Stadium – 52,500 (1 game)
- Avg. attendance: 15,831 (Note: Home games played at AAMI Park only)
- High attendance: 25,308 (Round 24)

Top scorers
- Tries: Xavier Coates (16)
- Goals: Nick Meaney (48)
- Points: Nick Meaney (148)
← 2021	List of seasons	2023 →

The 2022 Melbourne Storm season was the 25th in the club's history, competing in the 2022 NRL season. The team was coached by Craig Bellamy, coaching the club for his 20th consecutive season and for the second straight season, Melbourne had co-captains with Jesse Bromwich (second season), and Christian Welch (first season) sharing the duties, following the departure of Dale Finucane.

Melbourne qualified for the 2022 NRL finals series in fifth place, but were defeated by the Canberra Raiders 28–20 at AAMI Park to be eliminated in week one of the finals.

Club chairperson Matt Tripp summed up the season: "it's not our style to bow out of the finals in week one without a yelp... no one is making excuses about injuries but if you sit back and look at how many we had, there were excuses in key positions that cost us a few games throughout the home and away season, which made it tough in the finals."

== Season summary ==
- Preseason – New recruits from the 2021–22 season took part in Melbourne Storm IDQ camp for pre season before New Years. Josh King was awarded the IDQ Iron bar with special recognition to William Warbrick.
- 3 February – Ending a months-long absence, Nelson Asofa-Solomona returns to training after he "had provided all necessary information and certification to comply with the requirements of the Victorian and Queensland Governments to allow him to return for training and to play". It had been reported that Asofa-Solomona was in danger of missing the 2022 season after he missed a December 2021 deadline to prove his vaccination status against COVID-19.
- 19 February – Playing in Victoria for the first time since April 2021, Melbourne played their first NRL trial game of the year, going down 18–24 in front of a crowd of 7,000 at Casey Fields. An inexperienced squad, led by George Jennings played to raise funds for those impacted by the 2022 Hunga Tonga–Hunga Ha'apai eruption and tsunami.
- 27 February – In the final hit out before the start of the regular season, Melbourne played their first ever game in Ballarat, defeating Newcastle Knights 24–10 at Mars Stadium. Leading 6–4 at half time, tries to rookie Tyran Wishart, Felise Kaufusi, and new recruit Jayden Nikorima sealing the victory. Injuries to Cooper Johns and Xavier Coates the main concerns ahead of Round 1, exacerbated by a number of players who will miss the game through suspensions.
- 2 March – Prop forward Christian Welch is appointed a club co-captain for the first time, joining incumbent Jesse Bromwich in sharing the duties.
- Round 1 – Melbourne maintain their winning streak in round 1 games, dating back to 2001, defeating Wests Tigers 26–16 for the club's first win at CommBank Stadium. The win was remarkable due to the club missing key players through suspension and also three players sustaining serious injuries during the match, in addition, five players made their club or NRL debut, the most in a single game for Melbourne since round 14 of the 2000 season. The win was coach Craig Bellamy's 350th of his coaching career.
- Round 2 – Returning to AAMI Park for the first time in 321 days, and commemorating coach Craig Bellamy's 500th game, Melbourne extended their winning record against South Sydney Rabbitohs in Victoria to 18–0 with a 15–14 win in Golden point. Ryan Papenhuyzen kicking the winning field goal in the 84th minute.
- Round 3 – In a second successive Golden point game, Melbourne lose 28–24 against Parramatta Eels for the third straight game, with Ray Stone scoring the winning try in extra time after the ball bounced off the upright from a Mitchell Moses field goal attempt.
- 1 April – Melbourne extend the contracts of key players Harry Grant, Jahrome Hughes and Xavier Coates; re-signing the trio on long-term contracts to stay with the club.
- Round 4 – Ryan Papenhuyzen scores a career-high 28 points (four tries, six goals), as Melbourne keep Canterbury-Bankstown Bulldogs scoreless for the second time in club history, winning 44–0.
- Round 6 – With Jesse and Kenny Bromwich both unavailable, Jahrome Hughes becomes the 26th club captain, as Melbourne defeat Cronulla-Sutherland Sharks 34–18.
- Round 7 – ANZAC Day, Storm score an equal club record 70 points, defeating New Zealand Warriors by 60 in one of the largest wins in the club's history, retaining the Michael Moore Trophy. Xavier Coates scores four tries during the game, while Ryan Papenhuyzen is awarded the Spirit of ANZAC Medal.
- 4 May – Following assault charges against him being dismissed in Brisbane Magistrates' Court, Tui Kamikamica is handed a nine-match suspension, together with a $10,000 fine by the NRL for "bringing the game into disrepute". The suspension was retrospectively applied to cover the period Kamikamica was initially stood down by the club under the NRL's no-fault stand down policy.
- Round 9 – Melbourne defeat St. George Illawarra Dragons 42–6 in Nelson Asofa Solomona's 150th game and Kenneath Bromwich's 200th game. The win put the Storm on top of the NRL ladder for the first time in 2022 with a superior points differential. In addition, following the game Melbourne had accrued 325 points over the first nine rounds, eclipsing the Roosters' 1935 record.
- 10 May – It is confirmed that fullback Ryan Papenhuyzen (hamstring and knee – 4–6 weeks) and centre Reimis Smith (ruptured pec – 10–12 weeks) will be missing due to injuries sustained in the win against St. George Illawarra. Smith would later re-injure his pectoral muscle after aggravating the injury at training.
- 18 May – Melbourne confirm that head coach Craig Bellamy will continue in the role in 2023, his 21st season as coach in Melbourne. Bellamy had signed a new five-year contract with the club in 2022 that allows him to decide each year whether he will continue in the head coach role for the following season or transition into a coaching director role.
- 8 June – Young Tonumaipea rejoins the club on a train and trial contract, following the end of the 2022 Super Rugby Pacific season where he had been playing with the Melbourne Rebels. Tonumaipea last played for Storm in 2018.
- Round 14 – Grant Anderson makes his NRL debut, scoring two tries at the Sydney Cricket Ground in Melbourne's 26–16 victory over Sydney Roosters. Anderson who had been playing for Storm feeder club Sunshine Coast Falcons moved to Melbourne on a short-term contract and was called into the team due to an injury to Xavier Coates in Origin I. Anderson was the first debutant to score two tries at the SCG since Wallaby convert Phil Smith for South Sydney against St George in 1971.
- 13 June – PNG international centre Justin Olam renews his contract with Melbourne, with his new deal committing him until the end of the 2026 season.
- 12 July – Brandon Smith is suspended by the NRL Judiciary for three matches for contrary conduct in the Round 17 match against Cronulla. Smith was sent to the sin bin in the 60th minute by referee Adam Gee for calling him a "cheating bastard." The judiciary panel consisting of Tony Puletua and former referee Paul Simpkins taking the view that Smith's comments questioned the referee's honesty and integrity, handing down a penalty that reflected that the conduct was unacceptable and that a three match suspension acted as an appropriate deterrent.
- 15 July – The club announces that they have set a new NRL membership record, with 37,237 members (including more than 10,000 new members in 2022), breaking the record set by the Brisbane Broncos in 2018.
- Round 18 – Melbourne lose their third straight game the first time since 2015, as the Canberra Raiders won their fifth straight game at AAMI Park 20–16. Fullback Ryan Papenhuyzen suffered a fractured patella to rule him out for the season, he became the fourth player to suffer a season ending injury thus far. In a pre-match ceremony, the club honoured retired played Cameron Smith renaming the Eastern Stand at AAMI Park the "Cameron Smith Stand."
- 29 July – Wests Tigers winger David Nofoaluma joins Melbourne for the rest of the season on loan. Nofoaluma was brought in due to the club's injury toll.
- Round 21 – With injuries affecting the squad, Cameron Munster switches to fullback for the first time since 2018 and scores his second career hat trick of tries in a scrappy 32–14 win over Gold Coast Titans. The match sees Jesse and Kenny Bromwich become the first pair of brothers to play over 500 NRL games combined at one club.
- 8 August – The club re-signs Tui Kamikamica and Tepai Moeroa to new contracts to the end of the 2023 season, and signs Warriors second-rower Eliesa Katoa on a two-year deal from 2023.
- Round 22 – Melbourne hold defending premiers Penrith Panthers scoreless to win 16–0 at BlueBet Stadium. Melbourne had been the last team to hold Penrith scoreless at the same venue in 2015.
- 24 August – A flurry of re-signing news as the club extends the contracts of George Jennings, Grant Anderson, Jayden Nikorima, Dean Ieremia (2023); and Marion Seve (2024).
- Round 25 – Despite consecutive losses, Melbourne qualified for the 2022 NRL finals series finishing the season in fifth place on the NRL ladder. It was Melbourne's 12th consecutive finals qualification, but the first outside of the top four since 2014.
- Elimination Final – Melbourne are eliminated from the finals following a 28–20 defeat by the Canberra Raiders. After trailing 16–8 at half time, Melbourne rallied in the second half to take the lead, but were overrun as Canberra notched their fifth straight victory at AAMI Park.
- 27 September – Cameron Munster is awarded the Cameron Smith Player of the Year Award at the Melbourne Storm awards night. It was Munster's second Player of the Year Award win after previously being awarded the accolade in 2018. During the ceremony, Melbourne Storm CEO Justin Rodski announced that the club had signed up a NRL-record 41,108 members in 2022, and that two home games during the 2023 season would be held at Marvel Stadium due to AAMI Park's unavailability period for the 2023 FIFA Women's World Cup.
- 5 October – The club re-signs forwards Alec MacDonald, Trent Loiero (2025); and Tom Eisenhuth (2023). MacDonald joining the club's top 30 squad for the first time after playing 12 games in his debut season.
- 6 October – After months of speculation that he would leave Melbourne at the end of the 2023 NRL season, Cameron Munster re-signs with the club until the end of the 2027 NRL season.

=== Milestone games ===
Round	Player	Milestone
Round 1	Xavier Coates	Storm debut
Round 1	Nick Meaney	Storm debut
Round 1	Josh King	Storm debut
Round 1	Tyran Wishart	NRL debut
Round 1	Alec MacDonald	NRL debut
Round 2	Craig Bellamy	500th Storm game as coach
Round 9	Kenneath Bromwich	200th game
Round 9	Nelson Asofa-Solomona	150th game
Round 14	Grant Anderson	NRL debut
Round 16	Brandon Smith	100th game
Round 16	Jayden Nikorima	Storm debut
Round 19	Jahrome Hughes	100th game
Round 21	David Nofoaluma	Storm debut
Round 23	Josh King	100th game
Round 23	Harry Grant	50th game

== Fixtures ==
=== Pre-season ===
Date	Round	Opponent	Venue	Result	Mel.	Opp.	Source
19 February	Trial	New Zealand Warriors	Casey Fields, Cranbourne East	Loss	18	30	
27 February	Trial	Newcastle Knights	Mars Stadium, Ballarat	Win	24	10	

=== Regular season ===
- (GP) – Golden Point extra time
- (pen) – Penalty try

Date	Round	Opponent	Home/Away	Venue	Result	Mel.	Opp.	Tries	Goals	Field goals	Report
12 March	1	Wests Tigers	Away	CommBank Stadium, Sydney	Won	26	16	G Jennings, T Loiero, J Hughes, X Coates, R Smith	N Meaney 3/7		
17 March	2	South Sydney Rabbitohs	Home	AAMI Park, Melbourne	Won (GP)	15	14	X Coates, R Papenhuyzen, C Munster	R Papenhuyzen 1/1, H Grant 0/2	R Papenhuyzen 1/1	
26 March	3 (Note: Multicultural Round)	Parramatta Eels	Home	AAMI Park, Melbourne	Lost (GP)	24	28	N Meaney (2), B Smith, R Papenhuyzen	R Papenhuyzen 4/4	R Papenhuyzen 0/1	
3 April	4	Canterbury-Bankstown Bulldogs	Home	AAMI Park, Melbourne	Won	44	0	R Papenhuyzen (4), J King, K Bromwich, X Coates, F Kaufusi	R Papenhuyzen 6/8		
9 April	5	Canberra Raiders	Away	McDonald's Park, Wagga Wagga	Won	30	16	J Hughes (2), H Grant, R Papenhuyzen, J Olam	R Papenhuyzen 5/5		
16 April	6	Cronulla-Sutherland Sharks	Home	AAMI Park, Melbourne	Won	34	16	J Olam (2), C Munster, R Papenhuyzen, H Grant	R Papenhuyzen 7/7		
25 April	7 (Note: ANZAC Round)	New Zealand Warriors	Home	AAMI Park, Melbourne	Won	70	10	X Coates (4), J Hughes (2), N Meaney (2), R Papenhuyzen (2), H Grant, J Bromwich, J Olam	R Papenhuyzen 7/10, H Grant 0/1, C Munster 0/1, N Meaney 2/3		
1 May	8	Newcastle Knights	Away	McDonald Jones Stadium, Newcastle	Won	50	2	X Coates (3), J Olam (2), J Hughes, T Moeroa, N Meaney, C Munster	R Papenhuyzen 7/10		
8 May	9	St. George Illawarra Dragons	Home	AAMI Park, Melbourne	Won	42	6	R Papenhuyzen (2), N Meaney, J Hughes, C Munster, N Asofa-Solomona, T Loiero	R Papenhuyzen 2/3, N Meaney 5/6		
14 May	10 (Note: Magic Round)	Penrith Panthers	Home	Suncorp Stadium, Brisbane	Lost	6	32	N Meaney	N Meaney 1/1		
21 May	11	North Queensland Cowboys	Away	Queensland Country Bank Stadium, Townsville	Lost	6	36	F Kaufusi	N Meaney 1/1		
26 May	12 (Note: Indigenous Round)	Manly Sea Eagles	Home	AAMI Park, Melbourne	Won	28	8	C Munster (2), C Lewis, X Coates, K Bromwich	N Meaney 4/5		
5 June	13	Bye									
11 June	14	Sydney Roosters	Away	Sydney Cricket Ground, Sydney	Won	26	18	G Anderson (2), M Seve (2), F Kaufusi	N Meaney 3/5		
17 June	15	Brisbane Broncos	Home	AAMI Park, Melbourne	Won	32	20	D Ieremia (2), J Hughes (2), T Kamikamica, C Munster	N Meaney 4/7		
30 June	16	Manly Sea Eagles	Away	4 Pines Park, Sydney	Lost	30	36	R Papenhuyzen (2), N Meaney, B Smith, N Asofa-Solomona, J Olam	N Meaney 2/2, R Papenhuyzen 1/3		
7 July	17	Cronulla-Sutherland Sharks	Away	PointsBet Stadium, Sydney	Lost	6	28	A MacDonald	N Meaney 1/1		
17 July	18	Canberra Raiders	Home	AAMI Park, Melbourne	Lost	16	20	N Meaney, J Hughes, H Grant	R Papenhuyzen 1/1, N Meaney 1/2		
23 July	19	South Sydney Rabbitohs	Away	Accor Stadium, Sydney	Lost	12	24	M Seve, D Ieremia	N Meaney 2/2		
29 July	20	New Zealand Warriors	Away	Mt Smart Stadium, Auckland	Won	24	12	J Olam, H Grant, J Hughes, N Meaney	N Meaney 3/5, C Munster 1/1		
5 August	21	Gold Coast Titans	Home	AAMI Park, Melbourne	Won	32	14	C Munster (3), X Coates, K Bromwich, Y Tonumaipea	C Munster 4/6		
11 August	22	Penrith Panthers	Away	BlueBet Stadium, Penrith	Won	16	0	N Meaney, B Smith, D Nofoaluma	N Meaney 2/3		
19 August	23	Brisbane Broncos	Away	Suncorp Stadium, Brisbane	Won	60	12	D Nofoaluma (2), J Olam (2), Y Tonumaipea, T Kamikamica, C Munster, H Grant, J Hughes, N Asofa-Solomona	N Meaney 10/11		
26 August	24	Sydney Roosters	Home	AAMI Park, Melbourne	Lost	14	18	X Coates, N Meaney	N Meaney 3/3		
1 September	25	Parramatta Eels	Away	CommBank Stadium, Sydney	Lost	14	22	H Grant, N Meaney, D Nofoaluma	N Meaney 1/2, C Munster 0/1		

Fixture notes:

=== Finals ===
First elimination final

10 September 2022
17:40 AEST (UTC+10)

Melbourne Storm	20 – 28	Canberra Raiders
Tries: 4 Coates 17', 21', 44'; Asofa-Solomona 56'; Goals: 2 Munster 46', 58' (2/5)	1st: 8–16; 2nd: 12–12; Report	Tries: 5 Timoko 7'; Fogarty 31'; Whitehead 34'; Young 65'; Rapana 73'; Goals: 4 Fogarty 32', 36', 66', 75' (4/5)

AAMI Park, Melbourne
Attendance: 20,838
Referee: Grant Atkins
Bunker: Ashley Klein
Touch judges: Drew Oultram, Liam Kennedy

== Ladder ==
2022 NRL season
Pos	Team	Pld	W	D	L	B	PF	PA	PD	Pts
1	Penrith Panthers (P)	24	20	0	4	1	636	330	+306	42
2	Cronulla-Sutherland Sharks	24	18	0	6	1	573	364	+209	38
3	North Queensland Cowboys	24	17	0	7	1	633	361	+272	36
4	Parramatta Eels	24	16	0	8	1	608	489	+119	34
5	Melbourne Storm	24	15	0	9	1	657	410	+247	32
6	Sydney Roosters	24	15	0	9	1	635	434	+201	32
7	South Sydney Rabbitohs	24	14	0	10	1	604	474	+130	30
8	Canberra Raiders	24	14	0	10	1	524	461	+63	30
9	Brisbane Broncos	24	13	0	11	1	514	550	−36	28
10	St. George Illawarra Dragons	24	12	0	12	1	469	569	−100	26
11	Manly Warringah Sea Eagles	24	9	0	15	1	490	595	−105	20
12	Canterbury-Bankstown Bulldogs	24	7	0	17	1	383	575	−192	16
13	Gold Coast Titans	24	6	0	18	1	455	660	−205	14
14	Newcastle Knights	24	6	0	18	1	372	662	−290	14
15	New Zealand Warriors	24	6	0	18	1	408	700	−292	14
16	Wests Tigers	24	4	0	20	1	352	679	−327	10

== Coaching staff ==
- Craig Bellamy – Head Coach
- Stephen Kearney – Assistant Coach
- Marc Brentnall – Assistant Coach
- Aaron Bellamy – Development Coach
- Ryan Hinchcliffe – Development Coach
- Frank Ponissi – Football Director
- Ryan Hoffman – Football Administration Coordinator
- Billy Slater – Specialist Coach (Part-time)
- Cooper Cronk – Halves Coach (Part-time)
- Matt Duffie – Pathways Coach
- Tim Glasby – Recruitment Officer and Pathways Manager
- Adam Woolnough – Victoria Thunderbolts (Under-21s) Head Coach
- Jon Buchanan – Easts Tigers Feeder Club Coach
- Brad Henderson – Sunshine Coast Falcons Feeder Club Coach

== 2022 squad ==
List current as of 1 August 2022

Cap	Nat.	Player name	Position	First Storm game	Previous First Grade RL club (Note: Previous First Grade RL club: This column denotes the previous RL club the player was signed to and played first grade RL for. If they are yet to debut then this is stipulated. If they were merely signed to the club but did not play then it is not counted)
119	(New Zealand)	Jesse Bromwich	PR	2010	(Australia) Melbourne Storm
149	(New Zealand)	Kenneath Bromwich	PR, SR, LK	2013	(Australia) Melbourne Storm
154	(Samoa)	Young Tonumaipea	WG, FB	2014	(Australia) Melbourne Storm
160	(Australia)	Cameron Munster	FE, FB	2014	(Australia) Melbourne Storm
164	(Tonga)	Felise Kaufusi	PR	2015	(Australia) Melbourne Storm
166	(New Zealand)	Nelson Asofa-Solomona	SR, PR	2015	(Australia) Melbourne Storm
167	(Australia)	Christian Welch	SR, PR	2015	(Australia) Melbourne Storm
181	(Fiji)	Tui Kamikamica	SR, PR	2017	(Australia) Melbourne Storm
182	(New Zealand)	Brandon Smith	HK, LK	2017	(Australia) Melbourne Storm
184	(New Zealand)	Jahrome Hughes	FE, FB	2017	(Australia) North Queensland Cowboys
187	(Papua New Guinea)	Justin Olam	WG, CE	2018	(Australia) Melbourne Storm
188	(Australia)	Harry Grant	HK	2018	(Australia) Melbourne Storm
192	(Australia)	Tom Eisenhuth	SR	2019	(Australia) Penrith Panthers
193	(Samoa)	Marion Seve	WG	2019	(Australia) Melbourne Storm
194	(Australia)	Ryan Papenhuyzen	FB	2019	(Australia) Melbourne Storm
201	(Australia)	Chris Lewis	SR	2020	(Australia) Melbourne Storm
204	(Australia)	Cooper Johns	FE	2020	(Australia) Melbourne Storm
209	(Tonga)	George Jennings	WG	2021	(Australia) Parramatta Eels
210	(New Zealand)	Reimis Smith	WG	2021	(Australia) Canterbury Bulldogs
212	(Australia)	Trent Loiero	SR	2021	(Australia) Melbourne Storm
213	(Samoa)	Dean Ieremia	WG	2021	(Australia) Melbourne Storm
214	(Australia)	Jordan Grant	PR	2021	(Australia) Melbourne Storm
215	(Cook Islands)	Tepai Moeroa	SR, LK	2021	(Australia) Parramatta Eels
217	(Papua New Guinea)	Xavier Coates	WG	2022	(Australia) Brisbane Broncos
218	(Australia)	Nick Meaney	FB	2022	(Australia) Canterbury Bulldogs
219	(Australia)	Josh King	PR	2022	(Australia) Newcastle Knights
220	(Australia)	Tyran Wishart	FE, HK	2022	(Australia) Melbourne Storm
221	(Australia)	Alec MacDonald	LK	2022	(Australia) Melbourne Storm
222	(Australia)	Grant Anderson	CE	2022	(Australia) Melbourne Storm
223	(New Zealand)	Jayden Nikorima	FE, HK	2022	(Australia) Sydney Roosters
224	(Samoa)	David Nofoaluma	WG	2022	(Australia) Wests Tigers
–	(Samoa)	Sualauvi Fa'alogo	FB	Yet to debut	(Australia) Melbourne Storm
–	(Australia)	Bronson Garlick	LK	Yet to debut	(Australia) Melbourne Storm
–	(Australia)	Cole Geyer	HK	Yet to debut	(Australia) Melbourne Storm
–	(Australia)	Jack Howarth	CE, SR	Yet to debut	(Australia) Melbourne Storm
–	(Australia)	Jonah Pezet	HB	Yet to debut	(Australia) Melbourne Storm
–	(New Zealand)	William Warbrick	CE, WG	Yet to debut	(Australia) Melbourne Storm

== Player movements ==
Losses

- Josh Addo-Carr to Canterbury-Bankstown Bulldogs
- Daniel Atkinson to Released (Note: Subsequently contracted by the Sunshine Coast Falcons)
- Aaron Booth to Gold Coast Titans
- Dale Finucane to Cronulla Sharks
- Nicho Hynes to Cronulla Sharks
- Ryley Jacks to Featherstone Rovers
- Max King to Canterbury-Bankstown Bulldogs
- Brenko Lee to Brisbane Broncos
- Isaac Lumelume to Canterbury-Bankstown Bulldogs
- Aaron Pene to New Zealand Warriors
- Darryn Schonig to Released
- Tyson Smoothy to Released
- Judda Turahui to Canterbury-Bankstown Bulldogs

Gains

- Grant Anderson from Northern Pride
- Xavier Coates from Brisbane Broncos
- Bronson Garlick from Newtown Jets
- Josh King from Newcastle Knights
- Alec MacDonald from Wynnum Manly Seagulls
- Nick Meaney from Canterbury-Bankstown Bulldogs
- Jayden Nikorima from Redcliffe Dolphins
- David Nofoaluma from Wests Tigers (midseason loan (Note: Until the end of the 2022 season.))
- William Warbrick from New Zealand national rugby sevens team
- Young Tonumaipea from Melbourne Rebels

== Representative honours ==
This table lists all players who have played a representative match in 2022.

Player	All Stars match	State of Origin 1	State of Origin 2	Mid-year Internationals	State of Origin 3	Other Internationals	World Cup
Nelson Asofa-Solomona	—N/a	—N/a	—N/a	New Zealand	–	–	New Zealand
Jesse Bromwich	—N/a	—N/a	—N/a	New Zealand (c)	—N/a	—N/a	New Zealand
Kenneath Bromwich	Māori	—N/a	—N/a	New Zealand	—N/a	—N/a–	New Zealand
Xavier Coates	—N/a	Queensland	—N/a	—N/a	—N/a	—N/a	Papua New Guinea
Harry Grant	—N/a	Queensland	Queensland	—N/a	Queensland	—N/a	Australia
Jahrome Hughes	—N/a	—N/a	—N/a	New Zealand	—N/a	—N/a	New Zealand
Tui Kamikamica	—N/a	—N/a	—N/a	Fiji	—N/a	—N/a	Fiji
Felise Kaufusi	—N/a	Queensland	Queensland	—N/a	—N/a	—N/a	Tonga
Josh King	—N/a	—N/a	—N/a	—N/a	—N/a	Prime Minister's XIII	—N/a
Tepai Moeroa	—N/a	—N/a	—N/a	—N/a	—N/a	—N/a	Cook Islands
Cameron Munster	—N/a	Queensland	Queensland	—N/a	—N/a	—N/a	Australia
Jayden Nikorima	Māori	—N/a	—N/a	—N/a	—N/a	—N/a	—N/a
Justin Olam	—N/a	—N/a	—N/a	Papua New Guinea	—N/a	—N/a	Papua New Guinea
Brandon Smith	—N/a	—N/a	—N/a	New Zealand	—N/a	—N/a	New Zealand
Reimis Smith	Māori	—N/a	—N/a	—N/a	—N/a	—N/a	—N/a

== Statistics ==
This table contains playing statistics for all Melbourne Storm players to have played in the 2022 NRL season.

Players are added as they play their first game in the season.

- Statistics sources:

Name	Appearances	Tries	Goals	Field goals	Points
Grant Anderson	6	2	0	0	8
Nelson Asofa-Solomona	23	4	0	0	16
Jesse Bromwich	23	1	0	0	4
Kenneath Bromwich	24	3	0	0	12
Xavier Coates	17	16	0	0	64
Tom Eisenhuth	6	0	0	0	0
Harry Grant	20	7	0	0	28
Jordan Grant	3	0	0	0	0
Jahrome Hughes	21	12	0	0	48
Dean Ieremia	11	3	0	0	12
George Jennings	1	1	0	0	4
Cooper Johns	4	0	0	0	0
Tui Kamikamica	16	2	0	0	8
Felise Kaufusi	21	3	0	0	12
Josh King	25	1	0	0	4
Chris Lewis	16	1	0	0	4
Trent Loiero	17	2	0	0	8
Alec MacDonald	12	1	0	0	4
Nick Meaney	23	13	48	0	148
Tepai Moeroa	8	1	0	0	4
Cameron Munster	22	11	7	0	58
Jayden Nikorima	1	0	0	0	0
David Nofoaluma	6	4	0	0	16
Justin Olam	23	10	0	0	40
Ryan Papenhuyzen	12	14	41	1	139
Marion Seve	15	3	0	0	12
Brandon Smith	21	3	0	0	12
Reimis Smith	9	1	0	0	4
Young Tonumaipea	2	2	0	0	8
Christian Welch	1	0	0	0	0
Tyran Wishart	15	0	0	0	0
31 players used	—	121	96	1/0	677

=== Scorers ===
Most points in a game: 28 points

- Round 4 – Ryan Papenhuyzen (4 Tries, 6 Goals) vs Canterbury-Bankstown Bulldogs

Most tries in a game: 4

- Round 4 – Ryan Papenhuyzen vs Canterbury-Bankstown Bulldogs
- Round 7 – Xavier Coates vs New Zealand Warriors

=== Winning games ===
Highest score in a winning game: 70 points

- Round 7 vs New Zealand Warriors

Lowest score in a winning game: 15 points

- Round 2 vs South Sydney Rabbitohs

Greatest winning margin: 60 points

- Round 7 vs New Zealand Warriors

Greatest number of games won consecutively: 6

- Round 4 – Round 9

=== Losing games ===
Highest score in a losing game: 30 points

- Round 16 vs Manly Sea Eagles

Lowest score in a losing game: 6 points

- Round 10 vs Penrith Panthers
- Round 11 vs North Queensland Cowboys
- Round 17 vs Cronulla-Sutherland Sharks

Greatest losing margin: 30 points

- Round 11 vs North Queensland Cowboys

Greatest number of games lost consecutively: 4

- Round 16 – Round 19

== Jerseys ==
In December 2020, Melbourne Storm announced a new 5 year sponsorship and apparel partnership agreement with British sportswear company, Castore. They will continue produce supporter wear and jersey for season 2022, the design announced on 14 January 2021 will be the same for 2022. Throughout the 2022 season, the club has used six different jerseys.

Home

The home jersey features a classic V shape on the chest with a yellow outline. Among the special features Castore has incorporated in the new jersey is a lightning bolt design on the sleeve and the inclusion of a Big V logo on the inner collar as a continuation of the Our Home, Victoria acknowledgment which began during the 2020 season to honor Storm's home state.

Away

The away jersey, worn when the home jersey creates a clash with the opposition, is a similar design to the home jersey but in majority white; worn with navy blue shorts and either navy blue or white socks with navy blue cuffs

Anzac Day

An alternate jersey, showcasing elements of the club's Anzac Day game day ceremony was worn against New Zealand Warriors in round 7. The jersey was rendered in an almost royal blue and featured elements including the silhouette of the Kokoda Track memorial located at the 1,000 Steps trail in the Dandenong Ranges National Park.

Indigenous Round

Designed by indigenous artist Coree Thorpe, of the Yorta Yorta, Gunnai, Gunditjmara and Wurundjeri nations, the 2022 Melbourne jersey worn during Indigenous Round was inspired by the Rainbow Serpent with yellow and orange lines across a majority purple base. The design also features a diamond pattern "symbolising the men and women who come together to form Melbourne Storm."

Alternate

On 30 June 2021 Castore announced a fan competition to design a jersey for the 2022 season which would become an alternate to the main home and away jerseys. The winning design was revealed on 22 May 2022 with the jersey worn in round 15. Designed by club season ticket holder Josh Flood, the mostly navy blue jersey features electric yellow lightning bolts.

Heritage

Revealed on 6 July 2022 to celebrate the 10-year anniversary of the 2012 premiership victory, Melbourne released a jersey design based on the home jersey worn during the 2012 season. The jersey was worn in round 18 against Canberra during the club's "Old Boys Weekend".

== Awards ==
=== Trophy Cabinet ===
- Michael Moore Trophy (Rounds 7 & 20)

=== Melbourne Storm Awards Night ===
Held at Ciel the Venue, Melbourne on Tuesday, 27 September.

- Cameron Smith Player of the Year: Cameron Munster
- Billy Slater Rookie of the Year: Tyran Wishart
- Melbourne Storm Members' Player of Year: Cameron Munster
- Melbourne Storm Most Improved: Marion Seve
- Melbourne Storm Best Back: Ryan Papenhuyzen & Nick Meaney
- Melbourne Storm Best Forward: Harry Grant
- Cooper Cronk Feeder Club Player of the Year: Sualauvi Fa'alogo
- Mick Moore Club Person of the Year: Daniel Di Pasqua
- Chairman's Award: Aaron Rizzatti
- Darren Bell Medal (U21s Player of the Year): Cole Geyer
- Greg Brentnall Young Achievers Award: Jared Nauma
- Best Try: Ryan Papenhuyzen, Round 7 vs New Zealand Warriors
- Life Member Inductees: Kenny Bromwich, Gerry Ryan, Danielle Smith, Ross Patison

=== Dally M Awards Night ===
Held at Randwick Racecourse, Sydney on Wednesday, 28 September.

- Dally M Five-Eighth of the Year: Cameron Munster

=== Rugby League Players’ Association Awards ===
- RLPA Centre of the Year: Justin Olam
- RLPA Five-Eighth of the Year: Cameron Munster
- 2022 Academic Team of the Year: Tom Eisenhuth

=== Additional awards ===
- I Don't Quit Iron Bar: Josh King
- Spirit of Anzac Medal: Ryan Papenhuyzen
- Under 19s State of Origin Player of the Match: Jonah Pezet
- Ken Stephen Medal nominee & NRL Community Team of the Year: Christian Welch
- 2021 Rugby League World Cup Team of the Tournament: Harry Grant (Interchange)
