= Harry Grant (rugby league) =

Australia international rugby league footballer (born 1998)

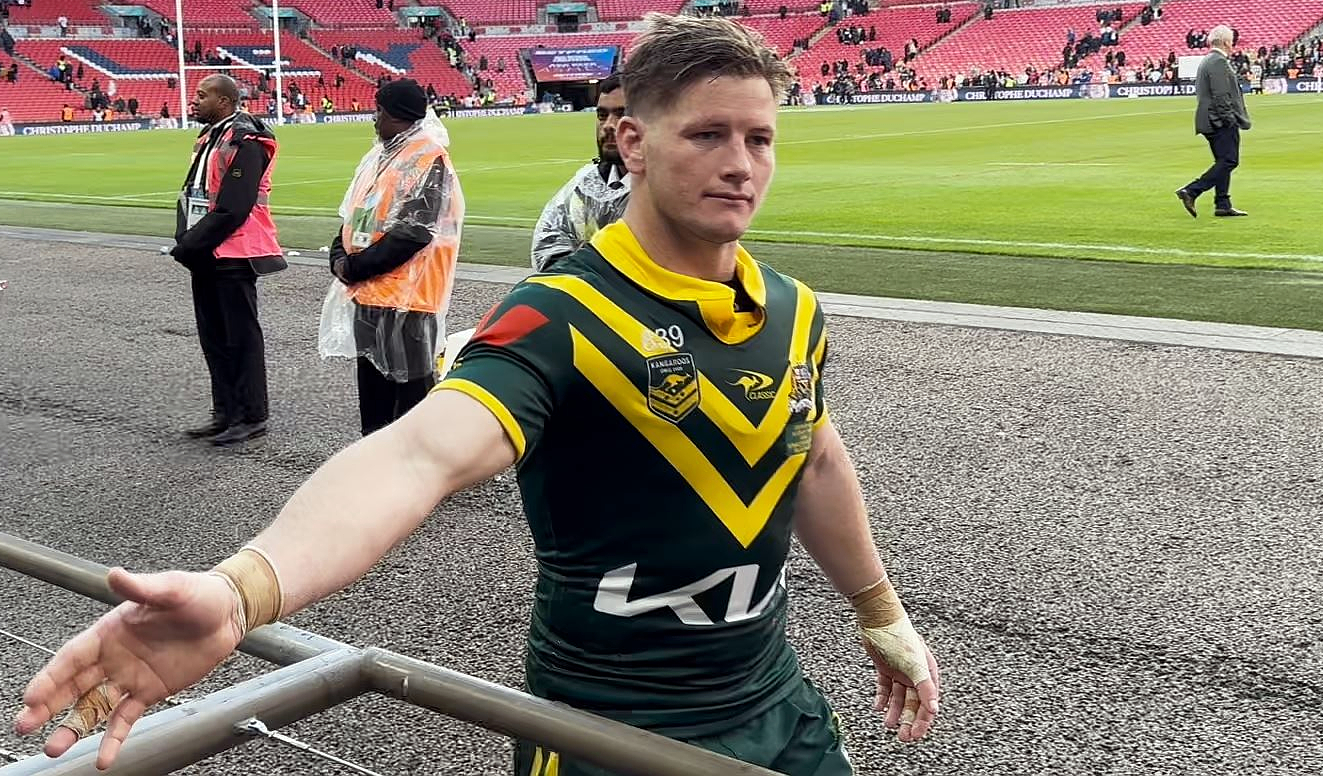

Personal information
- Full name: Harry Grant
- Born: 17 February 1998 (age 28) Yeppoon, Queensland, Australia
- Height: 177 cm (5 ft 10 in)
- Weight: 87 kg (13 st 10 lb)

Playing information
- Position: Hooker
Club
Years	Team	Pld	T	G	FG	P
2018–	Melbourne Storm	126	44	6	0	188
2020(loan)	→ Wests Tigers	15	3	0	0	12
	Total	141	47	6	0	200
Representative
Years	Team	Pld	T	G	FG	P
2020–26	Queensland	17	2	0	0	8
2022–	Australia	18	3	0	0	12
- Source: As of 16 November 2026

Harry Grant (born 17 February 1998) is an Australian professional rugby league footballer who captains and plays as a hooker for the Melbourne Storm in the National Rugby League, represents Queensland in State of Origin and vice-captains Australia at international level.

Grant played for the Wests Tigers on loan for the 2020 NRL season. The arrangement between Wests and the Storm to trade Grant with Paul Momirovski was the first loan arrangement in NRL history.

== Early life ==
Grant is from Yeppoon, Queensland and was born in Rockhampton, Queensland, and educated at St. Brendan's College, Yeppoon. Harry Grant also did a stint at Yanco Agricultural High School for 2 years.

Grant almost died when he was 12 years old after contracting a staphylococcal infection. He was admitted to intensive care and underwent three operations before being placed on a course of antibiotics for five months. He then sustained a compound fracture in one of his legs when he an all-terrain vehicle rolled on the beach. As a result, he was unable to play rugby league for two years.

His older brother George Grant is also a rugby league player who has represented the Central Queensland Capras in the Queensland Cup as well as the Yeppoon Seagulls in the Rockhampton Senior Local Rugby League competition. They both played their junior rugby league for the Yeppoon Seagulls.

Along with rugby league, Grant also played Australian rules football for the Yeppoon Swans in the AFL Capricornia junior league in his younger years and was placed in the Gold Coast Suns Academy at the age of 13 before committing to rugby league at the age of 15.

== Playing career ==
=== 2016–2017: Early career ===
Grant played for the Melbourne Storm Holden Cup team from 2016 to 2017, scoring 9 tries and playing 21 games.

While playing for Melbourne Storm National Youth Competition, he also made appearances for Sunshine Coast Falcons in the Queensland Intrust Super Cup. At the season's end at Rugby League Players Association Awards night he was recipient of the National Youth Competition player of the year award.

=== 2018–2019: NRL Debut and further development ===
He made his NRL debut for the Melbourne Storm in their Round 11 match against Manly-Warringah . He had his Melbourne jersey (cap number 188) presented to him by Melbourne captain Cameron Smith.

In 2019, Grant spent the majority of the season playing for the Sunshine Coast Falcons in the Queensland Cup, taking them to the minor premiership and earning a spot in the Queensland Cup Team of the Year. He was also named the Falcons Player of the Year, winning the James Ackerman Medal.

In Round 25 he made his second NRL appearance, coming off the bench in Melbourne's 24–16 win over North Queensland.

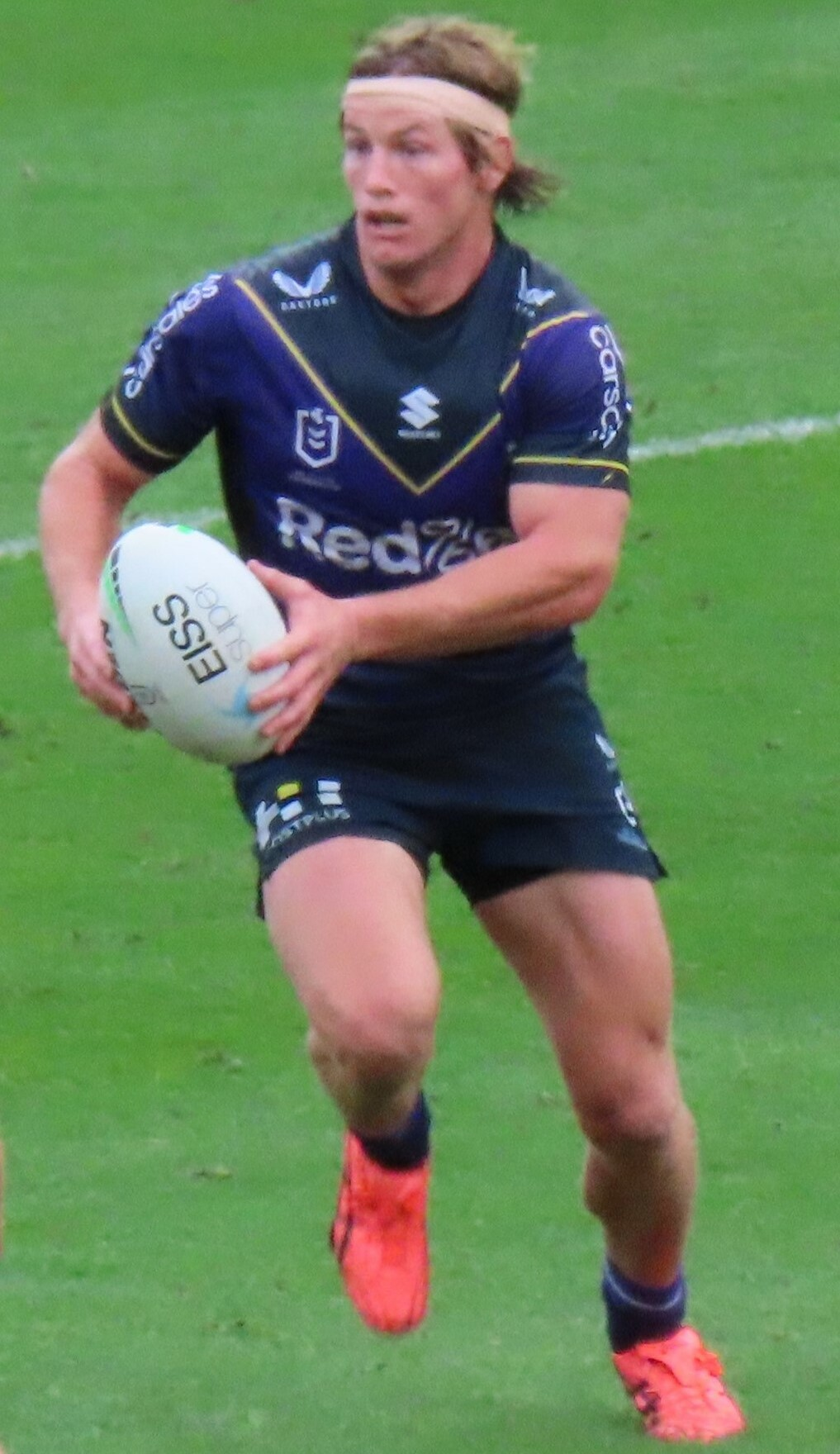
Grant playing for the Melbourne Storm in 2022

=== 2020: Wests Tigers Loan ===
During the lead up to the 2020 NRL season the Wests Tigers and Melbourne Storm attempted to arrange a temporary player swap between Grant and Wests Tigers player Paul Momirovski. The primary catalyst of this was Wests Tigers requiring reinforcements at Grant's preferred position of hooker due to the retirement of Robbie Farah and long-term injury to Wests Tigers preferred replacement Jacob Liddle. Grant, being Melbourne's third choice at his preferred position behind Melbourne Storm captain Cameron Smith and New Zealand Kiwis international hooker Brandon Smith was receptive to the move and began to push for it himself. Initially the NRL salary cap administrators refused to process the request because Melbourne would have gone over the salary cap if the deal had been processed at that time.

After the NRL initially rejected the arrangement, Grant requested an immediate release from his Melbourne contract in the hopes of joining the Wests Tigers as soon as possible though this did not eventuate.

There were further delays due to injury to Brandon Smith causing Melbourne to hold up proceedings so they could have Grant provide back up to Cameron Smith in the early rounds of the season, and briefly by Momirovski wishing to sign a new contract with Wests Tigers prior to leaving, but the deal was finally made official during round 2 of the season on March 21, 2020. This deal was the first of its kind in the NRL.

Grant was selected in the Queensland 27 man squad for the 2020 State of Origin series, Grant debut in Game 3 of the series in a 20-14 win scoring the match sealing try winning the series 2-1.

=== 2021–present: Regular game time and National debut ===
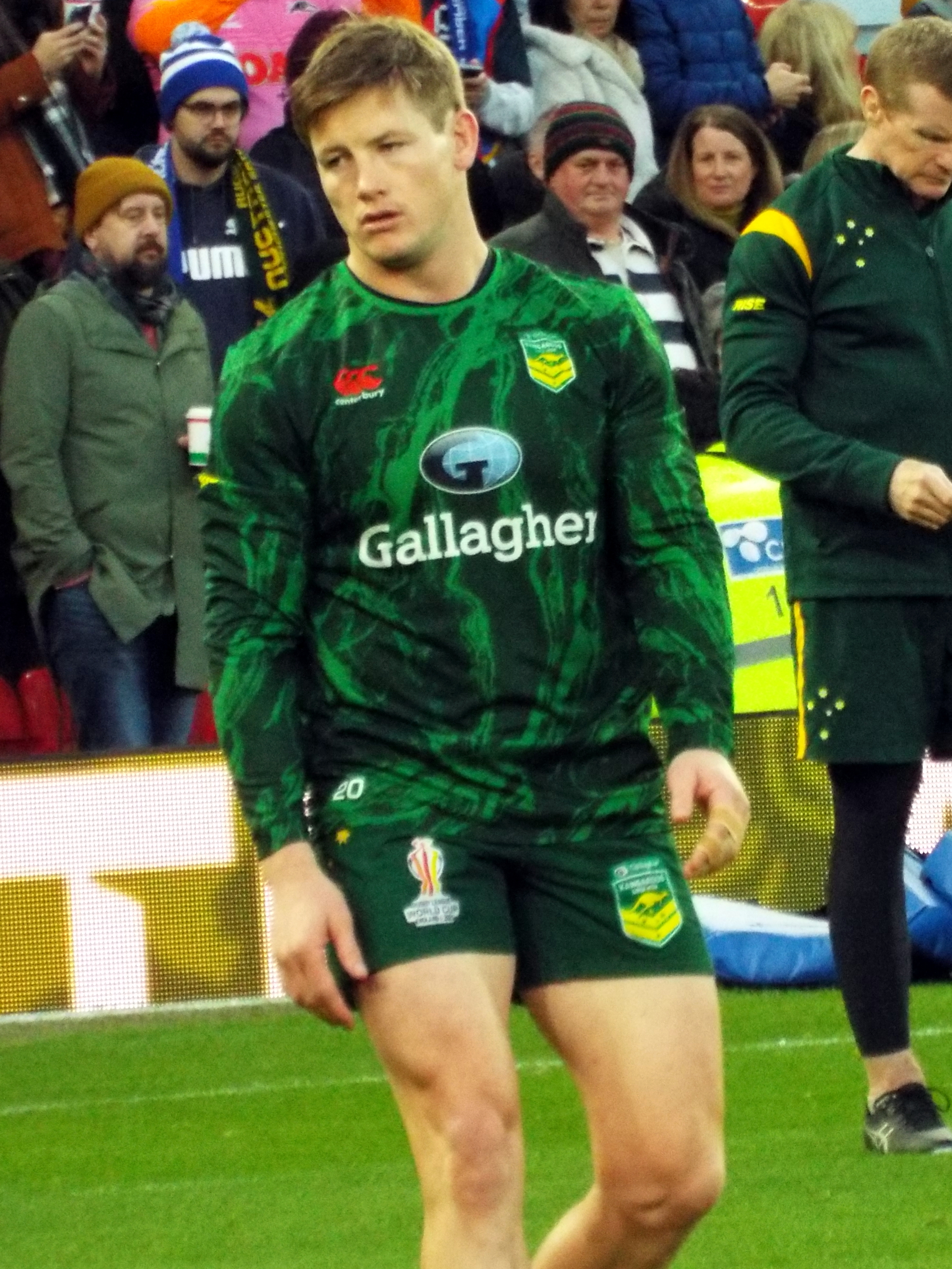
Grant warming up for the Kangaroos during the 2021 RLWC

Despite missing a number of games through injury, Grant was selected in the Queensland team for Game 1 of the 2021 State of Origin series. Grant played a total of 15 games for Melbourne in the 2021 NRL season as the club won 19 matches in a row and claimed the Minor Premiership. Grant played both finals matches including the preliminary final where Melbourne suffered a shock 10-6 loss against eventual premiers Penrith.

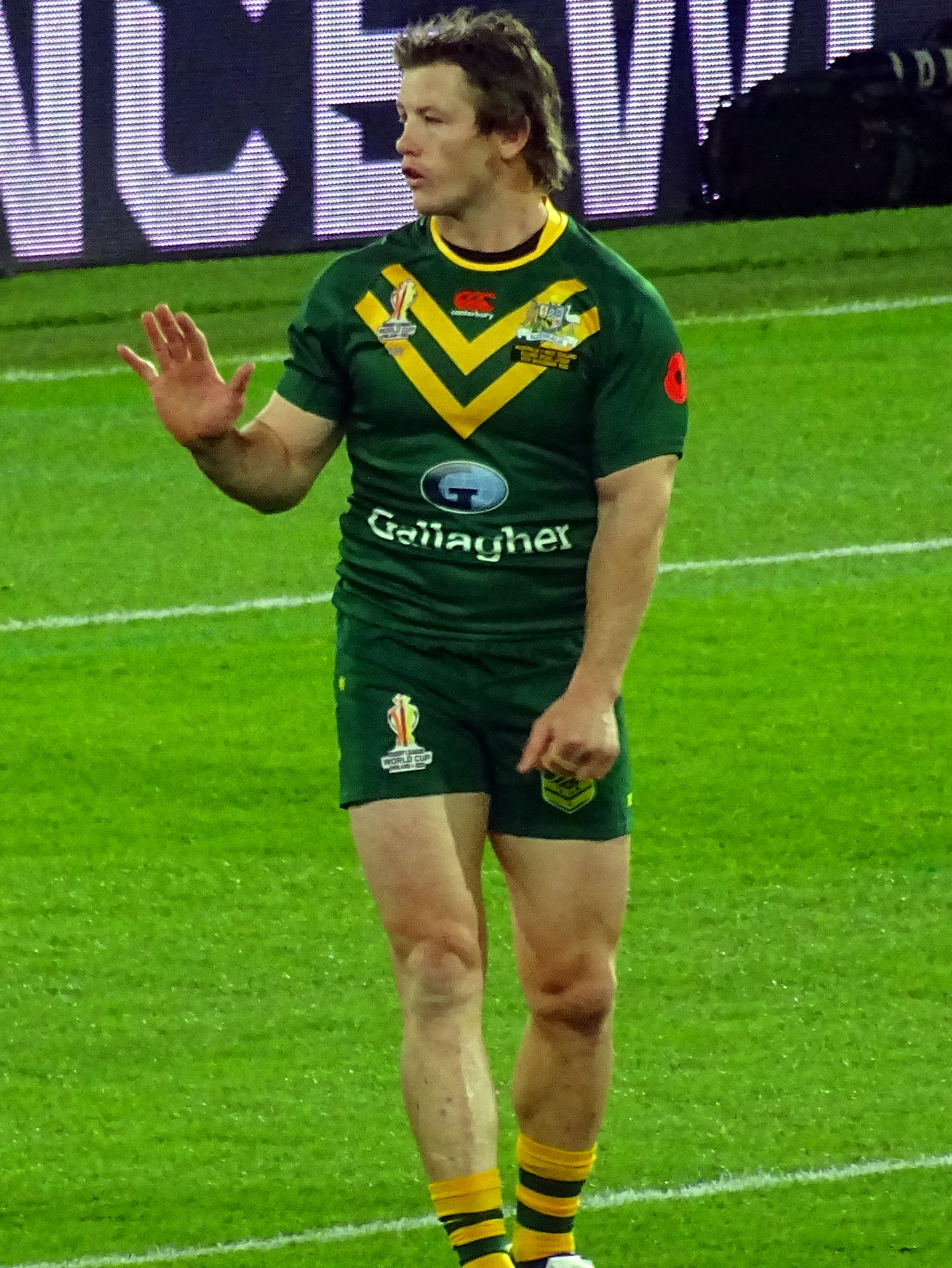
Grant playing for the Kangaroos at the 2021 RLWC

In October Grant was named in the Australia squad for the 2021 Rugby League World Cup.

Grant played for Australia in their 2021 Rugby League World Cup final victory over Samoa.

In November, he was named in the 2021 RLWC Team of the Tournament.

In the opening game of the 2023 NRL season against the Parramatta Eels, Grant scored the first golden point try in Melbourne Storm history. Grant played in all three games of the 2023 State of Origin series as Queensland won the shield 2-1. Grant played 25 games for Melbourne in the 2023 NRL season and as the club finished third on the table. Grant played in all three finals games for Melbourne as the club reached the preliminary final stage before losing to Penrith.

On 7 February 2024, Harry Grant became the 15th Melbourne Storm Captain taking over from Christian Welch. Grant was named on the bench for Queensland ahead of game one in the 2024 State of Origin series. Grant played a total of 23 matches for Melbourne in the 2024 NRL season as the club were runaway minor premiers. Grant played in Melbourne's 2024 NRL Grand Final loss against Penrith. Grant scored the opening try of the final.

In 2025 Grant played as starting hooker in all three State of Origin matches and scored the third of four tries for Queensland as they won the series deciding third match. Grant appeared in 19 matches for Melbourne during the 2025 NRL season of the 27 matches the team played. Grant missed four matches between Rounds 7 and 10 due to a hamstring injury, one match in Round 13 ahead of the first Origin fixture, and two matches in the final two Rounds (26 and 27) due to suspension for a shoulder charge. Grant captained Melbourne in their 26-22 2025 NRL Grand Final loss against Brisbane. Grant was selected for the 2025 Kangaroo tour of England and played in all three matches. In the absence of incumbent captain Isaah Yeo due to concussion, Grant was appointed captain for the Second Test match. Yeo returned to the team and captaincy in the Third Test, during which Grant scored a try. On 20 November, the Storm announced Grant had extended his contract for a further two years until the end of 2028. In December, Grant was named the men's 2025 IRL Golden Boot Award winner, alongside Julia Robinson (women) and Rob Hawkins (wheelchair). Grant played 21 games for Melbourne in the 2026 NRL season as the club finished 10th on the table, missing the finals for the first time since 2010.

== Statistics ==
Year	Team	Games	Tries	Goals	Pts
2018	Melbourne Storm	1			
2019	Melbourne Storm	1			
2020	Wests Tigers (loan)	15	3		12
2021	Melbourne Storm	15	5		20
2022	Melbourne Storm	21	7		28
2023	Melbourne Storm	25	9		36
2024	Melbourne Storm	23	11	1	50
2025	Melbourne Storm	19	5		20
2026	Melbourne Storm	18	6	5	34
2027	Melbourne Storm				
	Totals	138	47	6	200

== Awards ==
Competition

- Queensland Cup:

2019 – Team of the Year

- NRL Dally M Awards:

2020 – Rookie of the Year
2023 - Hooker of the Year
2024 - Hooker of the Year

- Rugby League Players Association:

2017 – NYC Player of the Year
2020 – Rookie of the Year

Club

- Sunshine Coast Falcons

2019 – James Ackerman Medal (Player of the Year)

- Melbourne Storm

2017 – Darren Bell Under 20s Player of the Year
2019 – Cooper Cronk Feeder Play of the Year
2022 – Best Forward

- Wests Tigers

2020 – Rookie of the Year

International

2021 Rugby League World Cup – World Cup Winner
2025 IRL Golden Boot Award
2026 Rugby League World Cup - World Cup Winner
