= 2023 Queensland Cup =

- Duration: March 11 – September 17, 2023
- Teams: 15
- Premiers: Brisbane Tigers (1st title)
- Minor premiers: Burleigh Bears (4th title)
- Matches played: 150
- Points scored: 7,516
- Top points scorer: Josh Rogers (234)
- Player of the year: Trai Fuller (Petero Civoniceva Medal)
- Top try-scorer: Jonathon Reuben (20)

The 2023 Queensland Cup season was the 28th season of Queensland's top-level statewide rugby league competition run by the Queensland Rugby League. The competition, known as the Hostplus Cup due to sponsorship, features 15 teams playing a 26-week long season (including finals) from March to September. The Brisbane Tigers won the competition for the first time in their history, defeating minor premiers Burleigh Bears in the Grand Final on 17 September.

== Teams ==
In 2023, the line-up of teams changed for the first time in 8 years with the addition of the Western Clydesdales. The North Queensland Cowboys changed their affiliation agreement, with the Cowboys sending all NRL contracted players not selected in their weekly squad to just the Townsville Blackhawks.

On 15 June, the Brisbane Broncos annulled their affiliation agreement with the Norths Devils after the Devils announcement that they had signed a four-year affiliation agreement with the Dolphins from 1 November 2023 ahead of the 2024 season. In response to the news, the Brisbane Broncos would remove their players from the Devils for the remainder of the season.

Colours	Club	Home ground(s)	Head coach(s)	Captain(s)	NRL Affiliate
	Brisbane Tigers	Totally Workwear Stadium	Matt Church	Ryley Jacks	Melbourne Storm
	Burleigh Bears	UAA Park	Luke Burt	Sami Sauiluma	Gold Coast Titans
	Central Queensland Capras	Browne Park	Lionel Harbin	Jack Madden	Dolphins
	Ipswich Jets	North Ipswich Reserve	Ben Cross	Rhys Jacks	Sydney Roosters
	Mackay Cutters	BB Print Stadium	Michael Comerford	Brandon Finnegan	North Queensland Cowboys
	Northern Pride	Barlow Park	Ty Williams	Chris Ostwald	North Queensland Cowboys
	Norths Devils	Bishop Park	David Elliott	Jack Ahearn	~~Brisbane Broncos~~
	Papua New Guinea Hunters	Santos National Football Stadium	Stanley Tepend	Ila Alu	None
	Redcliffe Dolphins	Kayo Stadium	Ben Te'o	Dunamis Lui	Dolphins
	Souths Logan Magpies	Davies Park; Logan Metro Sports Complex	Karmichael Hunt	Rory Ferguson	Brisbane Broncos
	Sunshine Coast Falcons	Sunshine Coast Stadium	Brad Henderson	Patrice Siolo	Melbourne Storm
	Townsville Blackhawks	Jack Manski Oval	~~Aaron Payne~~; Christian Quabba and Michael Morgan (interim)	Jayden Hodges	North Queensland Cowboys
	Tweed Heads Seagulls	Piggabeen Sports Complex	David Penna	Lindon McGrady	Gold Coast Titans
	Western Clydesdales	Clive Berghofer Stadium	Jason Alchin	Darryn Schonig	Canterbury-Bankstown Bulldogs
	Wynnum-Manly Seagulls	BMD Kougari Oval	Mathew Head	Luke Gale	Brisbane Broncos

== Regular season ==
- Fixtures
- Results

Team	1	2	3	4	5	6	7	8	9	10	11	12	13	14	15	16	17	18	19	20	21	22	F1	F2	F3	GF
Brisbane Tigers	RED; 0	**WMS** –2	PNG +2	**IPS** **+34**	**MAC** **+8**	**WES** **+4**	BUR –4	**TSV** **+18**	NOR +20	X	MAC +2	**CQC** **+2**	**RED** **–16**	**SCF** **–2**	IPS +22	NTP +26	WES +16	**TWE** **–26**	**PNG** **+14**	**SLM** **+2**	X	WMS +21	SLM +8	X	**CQC** **+8**	BUR +4
Burleigh Bears	NOR +6	X	**RED** **+26**	TWE +2	SCF –28	**PNG** **+26**	**BRI** **+4**	**CQC** **+4**	MAC +36	**WES** **+40**	IPS +52	SLM –14	**NOR** **+6**	X	**TWE** **+14**	**SCF** **–6**	PNG +8	RED –32	**NTP**; **0**	WMS +29	**MAC** **+14**	TSV +8	**CQC** **+26**	X	**WMS** **+49**	BRI –4
Central Queensland Capras	**TWE** **+1**	TSV +8	**NTP** **+20**	MAC +12	NOR +34	X	**WMS** **+4**	BUR –4	**RED** **–16**	**SCF**; **0**	**NOR** **+11**	BRI –2	TWE –24	NTP; 0	**MAC** **+8**	PNG –6	X	IPS +40	WES +16	**TSV** **+22**	RED –6	**SLM** **+4**	BUR –26	**SCF** **+28**	BRI –8	
Ipswich Jets	**SLM** **–14**	**SCF** **–40**	WMS –44	BRI –34	**WES** **–16**	RED –28	WES –36	PNG –12	X	**TWE** **–40**	**BUR** **–52**	**NTP** **–12**	SLM –10	TSV –16	**BRI** **–22**	**MAC** **–16**	**TSV** **–14**	**CQC** **–40**	**NOR** **–7**	SCF –14	TWE –64	X				
Mackay Cutters	WMS –38	**NTP** **–4**	**TSV** **–6**	**CQC** **–12**	BRI –8	**NOR** **–26**	PNG –8	NTP –4	**BUR** **–36**	RED –42	**BRI** **–2**	SCF +6	**WMS** **–62**	**TWE** **–4**	CQC –8	IPS +16	X	SLM –2	TSV –40	X	BUR –14	**WES** **+20**				
Northern Pride	X	MAC +4	CQC –20	**TSV** **+1**	**PNG** **+20**	WMS –20	NOR –48	**MAC** **+4**	WES +2	**SLM** **–16**	PNG +6	IPS +12	X	**CQC**; **0**	TSV +20	**BRI** **–26**	**WMS** **–16**	SCF –16	BUR; 0	TWE +10	**WES** **+2**	**RED** **+2**	WMS –1			
Norths Devils	**BUR** **–6**	**RED**; **0**	TWE –6	SLM; 0	**CQC** **–34**	MAC +26	**NTP** **+48**	SCF –4	**BRI** **–20**	**TSV** **+14**	CQC –11	X	BUR –6	RED +1	**SLM** **+36**	**TWE** **–14**	X	**WMS** **+12**	IPS +7	WES –8	**SCF** **–22**	**PNG** **+10**				
Papua New Guinea Hunters	WES +10	SLM; 0	**BRI** **–2**	X	NTP –20	BUR –26	**MAC** **+8**	**IPS** **+12**	TSV –50	WMS –4	**NTP** **–6**	**TWE** **+16**	**WES** **+36**	**SLM** **–30**	SCF +24	**CQC** **+6**	**BUR** **–8**	X	BRI –14	**RED** **+4**	**TSV** **+4**	NOR –10				
Redcliffe Dolphins	**BRI**; **0**	NOR; 0	BUR –26	**WMS** **+14**	SLM –56	**IPS** **+28**	**SCF** **+14**	X	CQC +16	**MAC** **+42**	SCF +10	**WES** **+32**	BRI +16	**NOR** **–1**	WMS –2	**TSV**; **0**	TWE +2	**BUR** **+32**	X	PNG –4	**CQC** **+6**	NTP –2	**SCF** **–6**			
Souths Logan Magpies	IPS +14	**PNG**; **0**	X	**NOR**; **0**	**RED** **+56**	SCF –18	TSV +26	WMS +22	**TWE** **+6**	NTP +16	WES +8	**BUR** **+14**	**IPS** **+10**	PNG +30	NOR –34	**WES** **+26**	**SCF** **+12**	**MAC** **+2**	X	BRI –2	**WMS** **+12**	CQC –4	**BRI** **–8**	**WMS** **–6**		
Sunshine Coast Falcons	TSV –4	IPS +40	X	**WES** **+28**	**BUR** **+28**	**SLM** **+18**	RED –14	**NOR** **+4**	X	CQC; 0	**RED** **–10**	**MAC** **–6**	**TSV** **–14**	BRI +2	**PNG** **–24**	BUR +6	SLM –12	**NTP** **+16**	WMS –2	**IPS** **+14**	NOR +22	TWE +25	RED +6	CQC –28		
Townsville Blackhawks	**SCF** **+4**	**CQC** **–8**	MAC +6	NTP –1	X	**TWE** **–2**	**SLM** **–26**	BRI –18	**PNG** **+50**	NOR –14	X	**WMS** **–26**	SCF +14	**IPS** **+16**	**NTP** **–20**	RED; 0	IPS +14	**WES** **+30**	**MAC** **+40**	CQC –22	PNG –4	**BUR** **–8**				
Tweed Heads Seagulls	CQC –1	WES +4	**NOR** **+6**	**BUR** **–2**	WMS +18	TSV +2	X	**WES** **+32**	SLM –6	IPS +40	**WMS** **–20**	PNG –16	**CQC** **+24**	MAC +4	BUR –14	NOR +14	**RED** **–2**	BRI +26	X	**NTP** **–10**	**IPS** **+64**	**SCF** **–25**				
Western Clydesdales	**PNG** **–10**	**TWE** **–4**	X	SCF –28	IPS +16	BRI –4	**IPS** **+36**	TWE –32	**NTP** **–2**	BUR –16	**SLM** **–8**	RED –32	PNG –36	**WMS** **–10**	X	SLM –26	**BRI** **–16**	TSV –30	**CQC** **–16**	**NOR** **+8**	NTP –2	MAC –20				
Wynnum Manly Seagulls	**MAC** **+38**	BRI +2	**IPS** **+44**	RED –14	**TWE** **–18**	**NTP** **+20**	CQC –4	**SLM** **–22**	X	**PNG** **+4**	TWE +20	TSV +26	MAC +62	WES +10	**RED** **+2**	X	NTP +16	NOR –12	**SCF** **+2**	**BUR** **–29**	SLM –12	**BRI** **–21**	**NTP** **+1**	SLM +6	BUR –49	
Team	1	2	3	4	5	6	7	8	9	10	11	12	13	14	15	16	17	18	19	20	21	22	F1	F2	F3	GF
Key: Bold – Home game X – Bye Opponent for round listed above margin

=== Season summary ===
- The Round 1 match between Redcliffe Dolphins and Brisbane Tigers was abandoned after four minutes due to torrential rain. Due to a number of factors, the match was not able to be replayed. The final result was given as a 0–0 draw, with each team awarded a competition point.
- In the days following the announcement of the changes to their NRL affiliation, the Norths Devils won a stunning 23–22 victory over the Redcliffe Dolphins after trailing 22–6 at half time, for their first win away to the Dolphins in over a decade. The victory was notable as the Devils played without any full time players after the Brisbane Broncos removed their players from the Devils line-up after the affiliation announcement.
- On 28 July, the Townsville Blackhawks parted ways with head coach Aaron Payne, who had been in the role since 2018.
- Round 18 was the competition's annual country round, with matches played across regional Queensland in Wondai, Biloela, Miles, Kilcoy, Weipa, Prosperpine and Stanthorpe.
- After suffering a 72–8 loss in round 21, the Ipswich Jets would end the season without a victory to become the first winless team in the competition since 2004. The 72–8 scoreline the biggest ever win in the competition for the Tweed Heads Seagulls.
- In the final round of the regular season, Burleigh Bears secured their second straight minor premiership with their 20–12 win over the Townsville Blackhawks. Burleigh snatching the title from the Souths Logan Magpies who stumbled to a 18–14 loss to the Central Queensland Capras. In a virtual elimination final, the Sunshine Coast Falcons defeated the Tweed Seagulls 37–12 to jump over the Seagulls into the finals. Norths Devils stalwart Jack Ahearn played his final Queensland Cup game, guiding the Devils to a 40–30 win at Bishop Park against the PNG Hunters. Melbourne Storm forward Alec MacDonald won the Paul Green Memorial Day medal in the Brisbane Tigers 41–20 win over the Wynnum Manly Seagulls.

== Ladder ==
Pos	Team	Pld	W	D	L	B	PF	PA	PD	Pts	Qualification
1	Burleigh Bears	20	15	1	4	2	547	376	+171	35	Finals series
2	Souths Logan Magpies	20	14	2	4	2	588	392	+196	34	Finals series
3	Brisbane Tigers	20	14	1	5	2	573	432	+141	33	Finals series
4	Central Queensland Capras	20	12	2	6	2	511	387	+124	30	Finals series
5	Redcliffe Dolphins	20	11	3	6	2	564	443	+121	29	Finals series
6	Wynnum Manly Seagulls	20	12	0	8	2	610	498	+112	28	Finals series
7	Northern Pride	20	11	2	7	2	363	442	−79	28	Finals series
8	Sunshine Coast Falcons	20	11	1	8	2	525	408	+117	27	Finals series
9	Tweed Heads Seagulls	20	11	0	9	2	614	478	+136	26	
10	Papua New Guinea Hunters	20	9	1	10	2	464	514	−50	23	
11	Norths Devils	20	8	2	10	2	551	530	+21	22	
12	Townsville Blackhawks	20	8	1	11	2	480	455	+25	21	
13	Western Clydesdales	20	3	0	17	2	452	684	−232	10	
14	Mackay Cutters	20	3	0	17	2	332	606	−274	10	
15	Ipswich Jets	20	0	0	20	2	342	871	−529	4	

Source: QRL

=== Ladder progression ===
- Numbers highlighted in green indicate that the team finished the round inside the top eight.
- Numbers highlighted in blue indicates the team finished first on the ladder in that round.
- Numbers highlighted in red indicates the team finished last place on the ladder in that round.
- Underlined numbers indicate that the team had a bye during that round.

	Team	1	2	3	4	5	6	7	8	9	10	11	12	13	14	15	16	17	18	19	20	21	22
1	Burleigh Bears	2	4	6	8	8	10	12	14	16	18	20	20	22	24	26	26	28	28	29	31	33	35
2	Souths Logan Magpies	2	3	5	6	8	8	10	12	14	16	18	20	22	24	24	26	28	30	32	32	34	34
3	Brisbane Tigers	1	1	3	5	7	9	9	11	13	15	17	19	19	19	21	23	25	25	27	29	31	33
4	Central Queensland Capras	2	4	6	8	10	12	14	14	14	15	17	17	17	18	20	20	22	24	26	28	28	30
5	Redcliffe Dolphins	1	2	2	4	4	6	8	10	12	14	16	18	20	20	20	21	23	25	27	27	29	29
6	Wynnum-Manly Seagulls	2	4	6	6	6	8	8	8	10	12	14	16	18	20	22	24	26	26	28	28	28	28
7	Northern Pride	2	4	4	6	8	8	8	10	12	12	14	16	18	19	21	21	21	21	22	24	26	28
8	Sunshine Coast Falcons	0	2	4	6	8	10	10	12	14	15	15	15	15	17	17	19	19	21	21	23	25	27
9	Tweed Heads Seagulls	0	2	4	4	6	8	10	12	12	14	14	14	16	18	18	20	20	22	24	24	26	26
10	Papua New Guinea Hunters	2	3	3	5	5	5	7	9	9	9	9	11	13	13	15	17	17	19	19	21	23	23
11	Norths Devils	0	1	1	2	2	4	6	6	6	8	8	10	10	12	14	14	16	18	20	20	20	22
12	Townsville Blackhawks	2	2	4	4	6	6	6	6	8	8	10	10	12	14	14	15	17	19	21	21	21	21
13	Toowoomba Clydesdales	0	0	2	2	4	4	6	6	6	6	6	6	6	6	8	8	8	8	8	10	10	10
14	Mackay Cutters	0	0	0	0	0	0	0	0	0	0	0	2	2	2	2	4	6	6	6	8	8	10
15	Ipswich Jets	0	0	0	0	0	0	0	0	2	2	2	2	2	2	2	2	2	2	2	2	2	4

== Final series ==
Home	Score	Away	Match Information
Home	Score	Away	Date and Time (Local)	Venue
Qualifying & Elimination Finals
Souths Logan Magpies	26–34	Brisbane Tigers	26 August 2023, 2:10pm AEST	Logan Metro Sports Complex
Burleigh Bears	38–12	Central Queensland Capras	26 August 2023, 4:00pm AEST	UAA Park
Redcliffe Dolphins	36–42	Sunshine Coast Falcons	27 August 2023, 2:00pm AEST	Kayo Stadium
Wynnum Manly Seagulls	15–14	Northern Pride	27 August 2023, 4:00pm AEST	BMD Kougari Oval
Semi-finals
Souths Logan Magpies	24–30	Wynnum Manly Seagulls	2 September 2023, 2:10pm AEST	Logan Metro Sports Complex
Central Queensland Capras	38–10	Sunshine Coast Falcons	3 September 2023, 2:10pm AEST	Browne Park
Preliminary Finals
Burleigh Bears	57–8	Wynnum Manly Seagulls	9 September 2023, 2:00pm AEST	UAA Park
Brisbane Tigers	14–6	Central Queensland Capras	10 September 2023, 2:00pm AEST	Totally Workwear Stadium
Grand Final
Burleigh Bears	18–22	Brisbane Tigers	17 September 2023, 5:30 pm	Kayo Stadium

=== Summary ===
- Week One – Qualifying finals: Brisbane Tigers came from 10–6 down at half time to run over the top of the Souths Logan Magpies to progress to the preliminary final. A last minute intercept try to Max Lehmann extending the final score to 34–26. The Burleigh Bears played what coach Luke Burt called their best half for the season, taking a 14–12 half time lead to defeat the Central Queensland Capras 38–12 to book their passage through to the preliminary final.
- Week One – Elimination finals: The Sunshine Coast Falcons upset the Redcliffe Dolphins 42–36 in a thrilling contest. The Falcons had jumped out to a 34–6 half time lead, but a second half comeback from the Dolphins saw the home team close at the finish against a Falcons team struggling with injuries. In the final match of week one, the Wynnum Manly Seagulls advanced to the semi finals after getting over the Northern Pride 15–14. The match entered golden point after scores were level at 14–all at the end of 80 minutes. Seagulls five-eighth Josh Rogers scoring the winning field goal in the second half of extra-time.
- Week Two – Semi finals: With both teams missing a number of player who had been called up by the Brisbane Broncos, Wynnum Manly Seagulls jumped out to a 12–0 lead early in their elimination semi final against Souths Logan Magpies. The Magpies would level the scores at 24–all in the 63rd minute, but a converted late try to Stanford Talita would secure the victory for the Seagulls 30–24. In the other semi final, the Central Queensland Capras advanced to the preliminary final for the first time in 14 years, comfortably defeating the Sunshine Coast Falcons 38–10. The Falcons were missing all their Melbourne Storm affiliate players, after the Storm had rested a bunch of players in their final NRL match of the regular season.
- Week Three – Preliminary finals: The Burleigh Bears were the first team to qualify for the Grand Final, dominating the Wynnum Manly Seagulls to win 57–8. The Bears kept the Seagulls scoreless in the first half, running away with the match in the second half. In the other preliminary final, the Brisbane Tigers qualified for their first Grand Final since 2018, claiming a gritty 14–6 win over the Central Queensland Capras. Kane Bradley scoring the match-sealing try in the 71st minute after scores were close at 8–6 from half time.

=== Bracket ===
Qualifying and elimination finals
QF1: 26 Aug. UAA Park
1	Burleigh Bears	38
4	Central Queensland Capras	26
EF1: 27 Aug. Kayo Stadium
5	Redcliffe Dolphins	36
8	Sunshine Coast Falcons	42
EF2: 27 Aug. BMD Kougari Oval
6	Wynnum Manly Seagulls	15
7	Northern Pride	14
QF2: 26 Aug. Logan Metro Sports Complex
2	Souths Logan Magpies	26
3	Brisbane Tigers	34

Semi-finals
SF1: 3 Sept. Browne Park
Central Queensland Capras	38
Sunshine Coast Falcons	10
SF2: 2 Sept. Logan Metro Sports Complex
Wynnum Manly Seagulls	30
Souths Logan Magpies	24

Preliminary finals
PF1: 9 Sept. UAA Park
Burleigh Bears	57
Wynnum Manly Seagulls	8
PF2: 10 Sept. Totally Workwear Stadium
Brisbane Tigers	14
Central Queensland Capras	6

Grand final
GF: 17 Sept. Kayo Stadium
Burleigh Bears	18
Brisbane Tigers	22

== Grand Final ==
Sunday, 17 September
17:30 (AEST) (UTC+10:00)

Burleigh Bears	18 – 22	Brisbane Tigers
Tries: 4 Francis 27', 30', 65'; Sauiluma 60'; Goals: 1 Roberts 61' (1/4)	1st: 8–12; 2nd: 10–10; Report; Stats; Highlights	Tries: 3 Powell 13'; Bradley 34'; Lehmann 53'; Goals: 5 Pezet 15', 36', pen 48', 55', 75' (5/5); Sin bin: 1 Grant (yellow card) 80'

Kayo Stadium, Redcliffe
Referee: Tyson Brough
Touch judges: Dan Munro, Jack Klein
Player of the Match: Keano Kini (Burleigh)

Team details
Burleigh Bears		Position	Brisbane Tigers
Name	Number	Position	Number	Name
Keano Kini	1	Fullback	1	Corey Thompson
Tony Francis	2	Wing	2	Max Lehmann
Sami Sauiluma (c)	3	Centre	3	Solomona Faataape
Kea Pere	4	Centre	4	Kane Bradley
Ken Maumalo	5	Wing	5	George Jennings
Tyrone Roberts	6	Five eighth	6	Ryley Jacks (c)
Guy Hamilton	7	Half back	18	Jonah Pezet
Iszac Fa'asuamaleaui	8	Prop forward	8	Jordan Grant
Pat Politoni	9	Hooker	9	Tristan Hope
Emry Pere	18	Prop forward	10	Tristan Powell
Jacob Alick	11	Second row	11	Thomas Rafter
Joshua Patson	12	Second row	12	Leivaha Pulu
Sam Coster	13	Lock forward	13	Charlie Murray
Matthew Koellner	10	Interchange	14	Cole Geyer
Creedence Toia	14	Interchange	15	Bennett Leslie
Vaka Sikahele	15	Interchange	16	Joe Chan
Dylan Kelly	16	Interchange	20	Jack Natapu
Hayden Schwass (not used)	20	Reserve	7	Jack Miers (not used)
Luke Burt		Coach		Matt Church
QRL

=== First half ===
Brisbane Tigers scored the first try of the match in the 13th minute when prop forward Tristan Powell stepped through the Burleigh Bears defence after receiving the ball 10 metres out from the tryline. Powell able to shake off would-be tacklers to plant the ball over the line close to the posts. Tigers halfback Jonah Pezet added the two point conversion goal to take the Tigers to a 6–0 lead. With 13 minutes left until half time, the Bears were able to make a break down their right flank, with a passing move finding winger Tony Francis to score in the corner. Keano Kini's footwork and flick pass unlocking the Tigers defence. A few minutes later, an attempted 40–20 kick from Burleigh halfback Guy Hamilton caught out Brisbane fullback Corey Thompson, with Thompson's attempt to keep the ball in play landing directly in the hands of Francis who crossed for his second try.

Trailing 8–6 after the try, Pezet put a high kick up with six minutes left in the half in the direction of the Bears tryline and teammate Kane Bradley was able to out-jump Keano Kini to score the Tigers second try, with Pezet's conversion taking the score to 12–8.

=== Second half ===
Jonah Pezet would extend the Tigers lead just after the break through a penalty goal, and then against the run of play, Max Lehmann ran nearly the length of the field after taking an intercept pass from Guy Hamilton. Lehmann able to outrun Keano Kini to take the score to 20–8. With just over 20 minutes to play, Hamilton has able to set up a try for Bears captain Sami Sauiluma to score, bringing the margin back to six points. Two dangerous tackles from Tigers hooker Tristan Hope saw him put on report, and Bears forward Vaka Sikahele taken off on the medicab. Sikahele looked to have suffered a dislocated patella in the second incident.

A few minutes later Tony Francis scored his third try of the match after a fortuitous bounce. With Tyrone Roberts unable to convert the try from out wide, the Tigers still held a slender 20–18 lead. Francis should have scored a fourth try in the 74th minute, but he failed to ground the ball over the line in the corner.

Pezet would again add to the Tigers score with two points coming from his boot after referee Tyson Brough awarded the Tigers a penalty with four minutes left.

In a frantic finish, the Tigers were able to hold out the Bears in the final minutes, with Jordan Grant sent to the sin-bin in the final seconds before full time.

Burleigh fullback Keano Kini won the Duncan Hall Medal as player of the match, but the premiership went to the Tigers with first-year coach Matt Church quoted as saying "Just so proud of the group. If someone told me 12 months ago this could've been a possibility, I wouldn't have believed them. I'm choking back tears now. It means so much... our long-suffering fans, it's been 32 years."

== NRL State Championship ==
As premiers of the Queensland Cup, the Brisbane Tigers faced NSW Cup premiers the South Sydney Rabbitohs in the NRL State Championship.

2023 NRL State Championship

Sunday, 1 October
13:20pm AEDT (UTC+11)

South Sydney Rabbitohs	42 – 22	Brisbane Tigers
	1st: 12 – 6; 2nd: 30 – 16

Accor Stadium, Sydney
Referee: Wyatt Raymond
Bunker: Chris Butler
Touch judges: Tyson Brough, Cameron Paddy

== QRL awards ==
- Petero Civoniceva Medal (Best and Fairest): Trai Fuller ( Redcliffe Dolphins)
- Coach of the Year: Karmichael Hunt ( Souths Logan Magpies)
- Rookie of the Year: Morea Morea ( Papua New Guinea Hunters)
- Duncan Hall Medal (Grand Final player of the match): Keano Kini ( Burleigh Bears)

=== Team of the Year ===
Position	Nat	Winner	Club
Fullback	(Australia)	Tristan Sailor	Souths Logan Magpies
Wing	(New Zealand)	Jordan Pereira	Souths Logan Magpies
Centre	(New Zealand)	Deine Mariner	Wynnum Manly Seagulls
Five-eighth	(Australia)	Josh Rogers	Wynnum Manly Seagulls
Halfback	(Italy)	Jack Campagnolo	Souths Logan Magpies
Prop	(Australia)	Bailey Butler	Central Queensland Capras
Hooker	(Australia)	Trey Brown	Central Queensland Capras
Second-row	(Papua New Guinea)	Jacob Alick	Burleigh Bears
Lock	(Australia)	Sam Coster	Burleigh Bears

== See also ==
- Queensland Cup
- Queensland Rugby League
