= Paul Momirovski =

Australian rugby league footballer (born 1996)

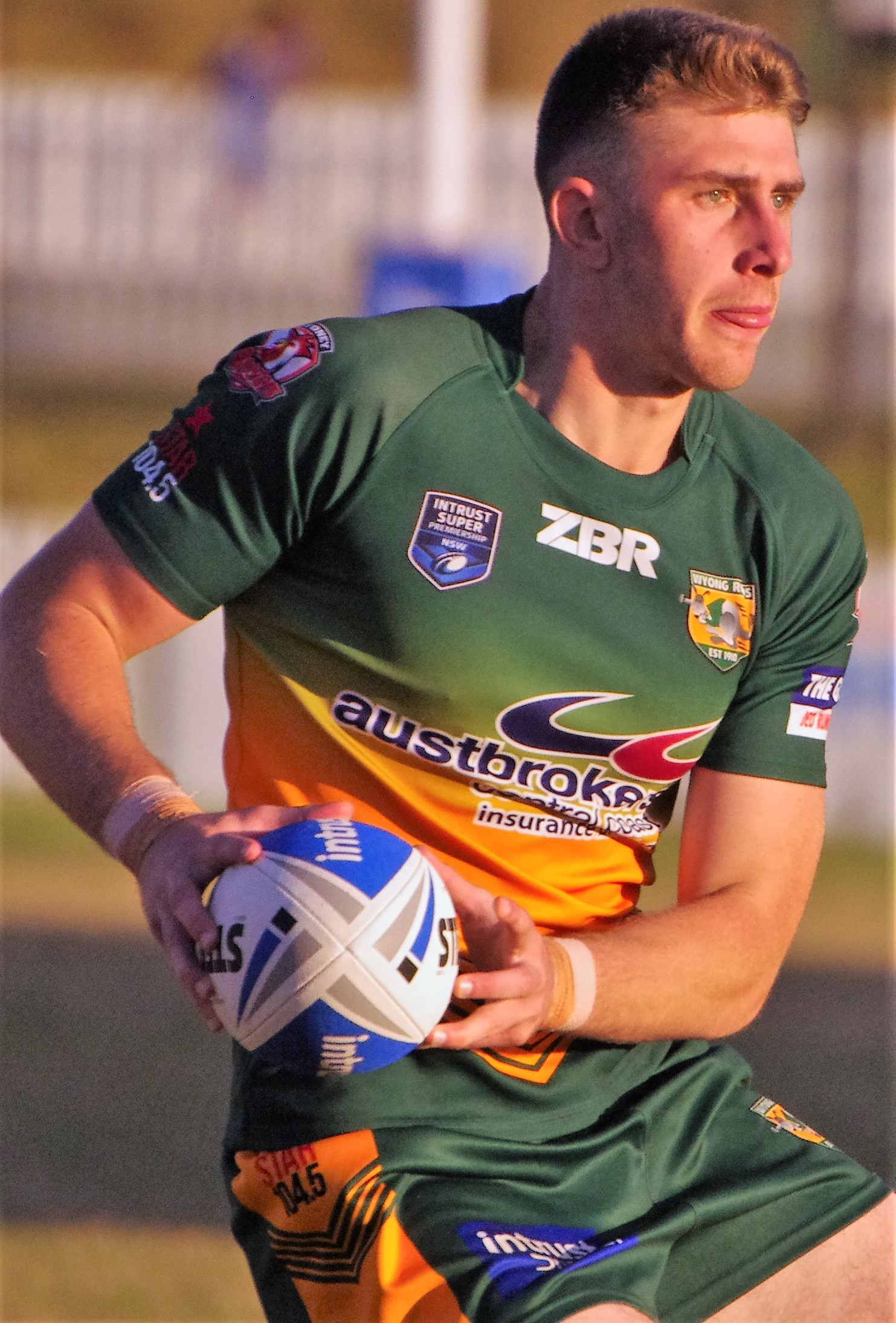

Personal information
- Full name: Paul Momirovski
- Born: 19 July 1996 (age 30) Sydney, New South Wales, Australia
- Height: 188 cm (6 ft 2 in)
- Weight: 94 kg (14 st 11 lb)

Playing information
- Position: Centre, Wing
Club
Years	Team	Pld	T	G	FG	P
2018	Sydney Roosters	2	2	0	0	8
2019	Wests Tigers	11	8	21	0	74
2020(loan)	→ Melbourne Storm	6	4	0	0	16
2021	Penrith Panthers	19	6	0	0	24
2022–23	Sydney Roosters	22	6	3	0	30
2024	Leeds Rhinos	24	7	0	0	28
2025	Lézignan Sangliers	16	15	24	0	68
	Total	100	48	48	0	248
Representative
Years	Team	Pld	T	G	FG	P
2019	Prime Minister's XIII	1	1	0	0	4
- Source: As of 10 February 2025

Paul Momirovski (born 19 July 1996) is an Australian former professional rugby league footballer who last played as a centre and winger for the Lézignan Sangliers in the Super XIII.

He previously also played for the Sydney Roosters, before playing for the Wests Tigers, Melbourne Storm and Penrith Panthers in the National Rugby League. In season 2020 he was on loan to Melbourne in the NRL. The arrangement between Wests and the Storm to trade Momirovski with Harry Grant for the 2020 NRL season was the first loan arrangement in National Rugby League history.

He played at representative level for the Prime Minister's XIII and is a premiership winning player of 2021.

== Background ==
Momirovski was born in Sydney and is of Macedonian descent.

He played his junior football for the Alexandria Rovers and played for the South Sydney SG Ball and Harold Matthews sides before signing with the Sydney Roosters in 2014. He co-captained the Roosters’ SG Ball side to a premiership in 2014.

== Playing career ==
=== 2016 ===
Paul played in the Sydney Roosters’ Holden Cup side from 2014 to 2016. Momirovski playing in the halves in the Sydney Roosters’ 2016 Holden Cup premiership winning team.

=== 2017 ===
Momirovski made his Intrust Super Premiership debut in round 1 of the 2017 Intrust Super Premiership vs Western Suburbs Magpies, playing at centre. Momirovski played 20 games in the season, scoring 5 tries, kicking 15 goals, and 1 match-winning field goal.

=== 2018 ===
Momirovski made his debut for the Sydney Roosters in round 18 vs the Gold Coast Titans, scoring a try. Momirovski played in the Roosters' Preliminary Final win against the South Sydney Rabbitohs, scoring a try. He was originally named in the Roosters squad for the 2018 NRL Grand Final, but he did not play due to Cooper Cronk returning to the squad shifting him to the reserves. Momirovski signed with the Wests Tigers for the 2019 season.

=== 2019 ===
Momirovski made his debut for Wests against Manly-Warringah in round 1 which ended in a 20–6 victory at Leichhardt Oval. In Round 21 against Canterbury-Bankstown at ANZ Stadium, Momirovski scored 2 tries and had the chance to send the match into extra-time with a kick at goal as Wests crossed over in the final minute to make the score 18–16. Momirovski subsequently missed his conversion attempt after the full time siren had sounded and Canterbury held on to win the match.

In round 24 against the St George-Illawarra Dragons, Momirovski kicked all seven of his attempts at goal and scored three tries in the 42–14 win at the Sydney Cricket Ground. His personal points tally of 26 was the club's highest since Brett Hodgson's record 30-point tally in the Wests Tigers 2005 premiership winning side.

On 30 September, Momirovski earned his first representative jersey as he was named at centre in Prime Minister's XIII

=== 2020 ===
During the lead up to the 2020 NRL season, the Tigers and Melbourne Storm attempted to arrange a temporary player swap between Momirovski and Storm player Harry Grant. The primary catalyst of this was Wests Tigers requiring reinforcements at Grant's preferred position of hooker due to the retirement of Robbie Farah and long term injury to Wests Tigers preferred replacement Jacob Liddle. Initially the NRL salary cap administrators refused to process the request because Melbourne would have gone over the salary cap if the deal had been processed at that time.

There were further delays due to injury to Brandon Smith causing Melbourne to hold up proceedings so they could have Grant provide back up to Cameron Smith in the early rounds of the season, and briefly by Momirovski wishing to sign a new contract with Wests Tigers prior to leaving, but the deal was finally made official during round 2 of the season, coinciding with the announcement that Momirovski had signed a contract with Wests Tigers for the 2021, and 2022 seasons. This deal was the first of its kind in the NRL.

=== 2021 ===
On 7 February 2021, Momorovski signed with the Penrith Panthers in a swap deal which allowed Daine Laurie to join the Wests Tigers a year early. In round 1 of the 2021 NRL season, he made his debut for Penrith in a 24–0 victory over North Queensland. In round 2, he scored two tries as Penrith defeated Canterbury-Bankstown 28–0 at Western Sydney Stadium. In round 6, he was placed on report after a high tackle on Brisbane player Tom Dearden in Penrith's 20–12 victory. He was later suspended for three games. He played a total of 19 games for Penrith in the 2021 NRL season including the club's 2021 NRL Grand Final victory over South Sydney. On 21 October, he signed a three-year deal to rejoin the Sydney Roosters starting in the 2022 season.

=== 2022 ===
Momirovski played 19 games for the Sydney Roosters in the 2022 NRL season scoring six tries. Momirovski played for the club in their elimination final loss to South Sydney.

=== 2023 ===
On 2 May, it was announced that Momirovski would be ruled out indefinitely from playing after suffering significant ligament damage to his shoulder. Momirovski was limited to only three matches for the Sydney Roosters in the 2023 NRL season as the club finished 7th on the table and qualified for the finals. He played in the clubs elimination finals loss against Melbourne. On 7 October, Momirovski signed a two-year deal to join English side Leeds.

=== 2024 ===
In round 1 of the 2024 Super League season, Momirovski made his club debut for Leeds against Salford. Leeds would win the match 22–16. Momirovski played 23 matches for Leeds in the 2024 Super League which saw the club finish 8th on the table.

On 21 December 2024, it was reported that he had signed for Lézignan Sangliers in the Super XIII for the remainder of the 2024/25 season.

=== 2025 ===
On 7 May, Momirovski announced his retirement from Rugby League.

== Statistics ==
Year	Team	Games	Tries	Goals	Pts
2018	Sydney Roosters	2	2		8
2019	Wests Tigers	11	8	21	74
2020	Melbourne Storm (loan)	6	4		16
2021	Penrith Panthers	19	6		24
2022	Sydney Roosters	19	6	3	30
2023	Sydney Roosters	3			
2024	Leeds Rhinos	24	7		28
2025	FC Lézignan	10	5	24	68
	Totals	94	38	48	248
