= Alec MacDonald =

Australian rugby league footballer

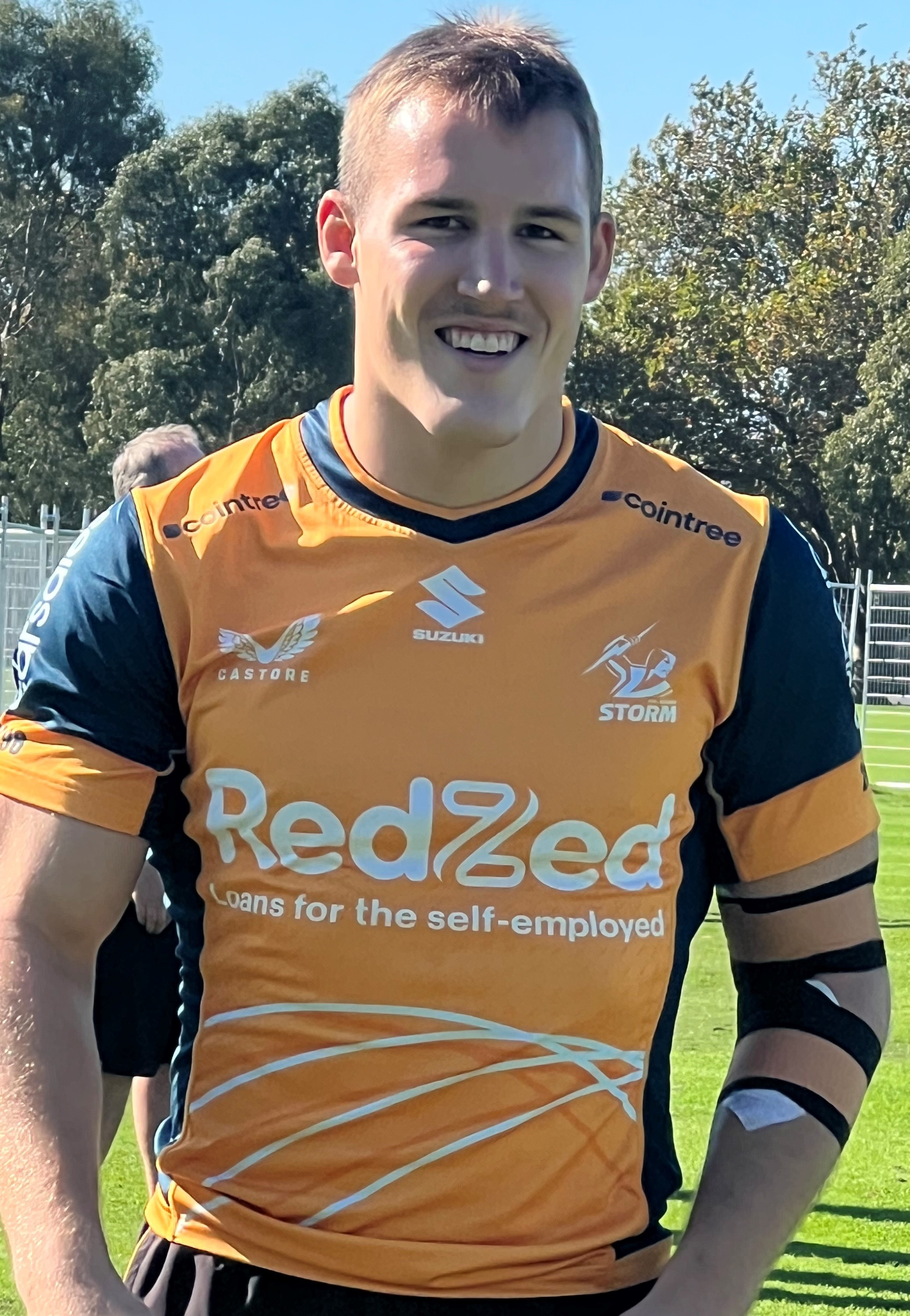

Personal information
- Born: 27 October 2001 (age 25) Auckland, New Zealand
- Height: 185 cm (6 ft 1 in)
- Weight: 98 kg (15 st 6 lb)

Playing information
- Position: Lock
Representative
Years	Team	Pld	T	G	FG	P
2022–	Melbourne Storm	85	5	0	0	20
- Source: As of 5 September 2026

Alec MacDonald (born 27 October 2001) is a New Zealand professional rugby league footballer who plays as a lock for the Melbourne Storm in the National Rugby League (NRL).

== Background ==
MacDonald was born in Auckland, New Zealand and moved to Queensland, Australiam when he was nine-years old.

Originally a Kumeu Moisty Mauler, he then played his junior rugby league for the Easts Springwood Tigers and Ormeau Shearers, and attended Chisholm Catholic College, Cornubia.

In 2021, he played three games for the Wynnum Manly Seagulls in the 2021 Queensland Cup, while winning the club's under-21s player of the year in the 2021 Hastings Deering Colts season. He was a member of the Wynnum Manly team that won the 2021 Hasting Deering Colts Grand Final 17–16 against Townsville Blackhawks. MacDonald then received a train and trial contract with the Melbourne Storm after being scouted by former Storm player Tim Glasby.

== Playing career ==
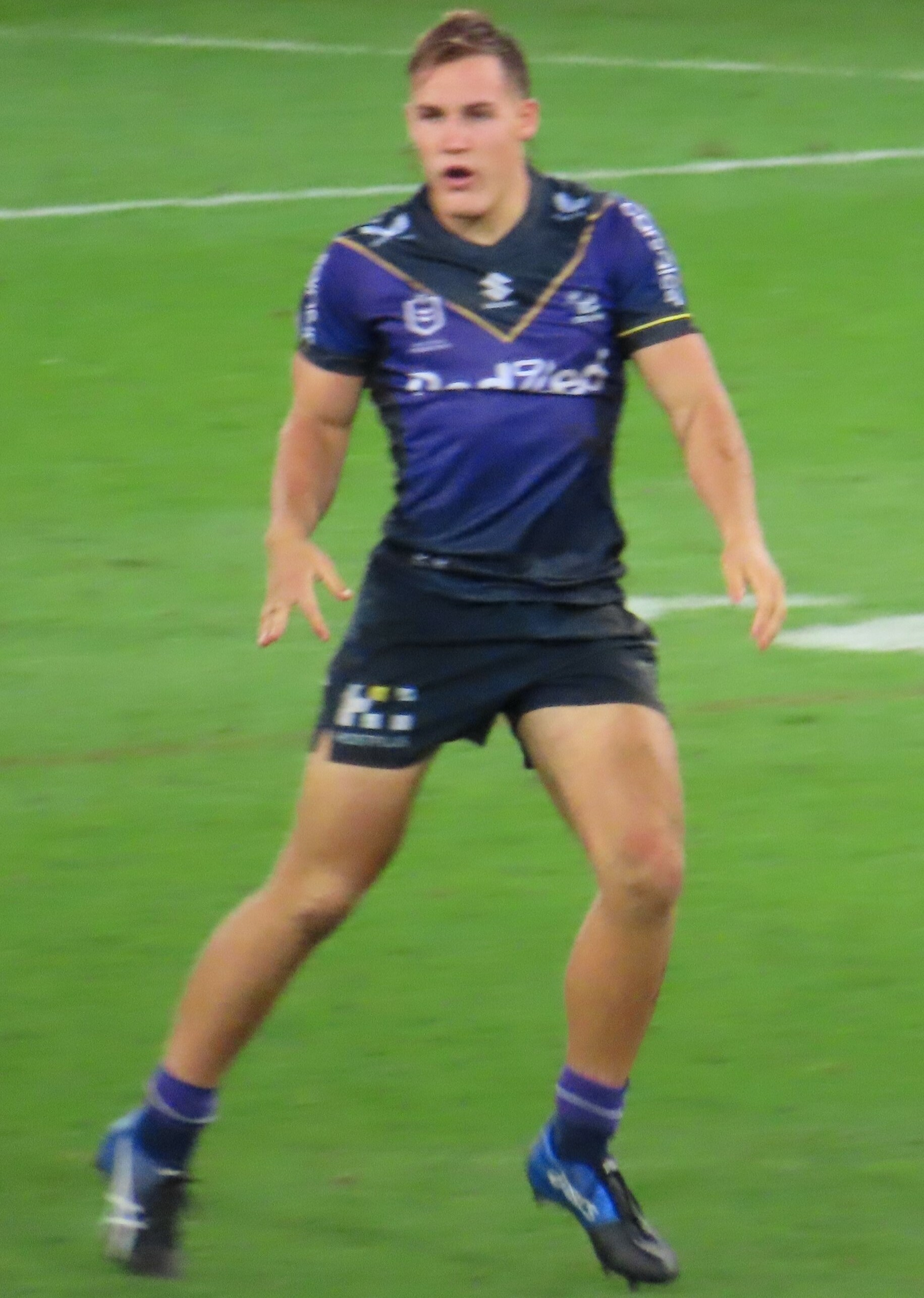
MacDonald playing for Melbourne Storm

MacDonald signed with Melbourne on a train and trial contract ahead of the 2022 NRL season, earning a full-time contract to stay with the club for the 2022 Melbourne Storm season. He made his debut in round 1 of the 2022 NRL season for Melbourne Storm against Wests Tigers (player cap 221). While with Melbourne, MacDonald also played for Storm feeder club Brisbane Tigers, making his first appearance for the Tigers on 24 April 2022 during the 2022 Queensland Cup season.

In round 17, MacDonald scored his first NRL try, scoring a late consolation try for Melbourne against Cronulla.

While playing with the Brisbane Tigers in the 2023 Queensland Cup, MacDonald won the Paul Green Memorial Day medal for his efforts in the Tigers final round win over Wynnum Manly Seagulls MacDonald played 12 games for Melbourne in the 2023 NRL season as the club finished third on the table.

In July 2024, MacDonald signed a contract extension with the Melbourne outfit, keeping him at the club until the end of the 2028 season. MacDonald played a total of 22 matches for Melbourne in the 2024 NRL season. He played in Melbourne's 2024 NRL Grand Final loss against Penrith from the interchange bench. MacDonald played 20 games for Melbourne in the 2025 NRL season including their 26-22 2025 NRL Grand Final loss against Brisbane. MacDonald played 19 matches for Melbourne in the 2026 NRL season as the club finished 10th on the table, missing the finals for the first time since 2010.

== Statistics ==
Year	Team	Games	Tries	Pts
2022	Melbourne Storm	12	1	4
2023	Melbourne Storm	12		
2024	Melbourne Storm	22	2	8
2025	Melbourne Storm	20		
2026	Melbourne Storm	19	2	8
2027	Melbourne Storm			
	Totals	85	5	30
