= Jordan Grant (rugby league) =

Serbian international rugby league footballer

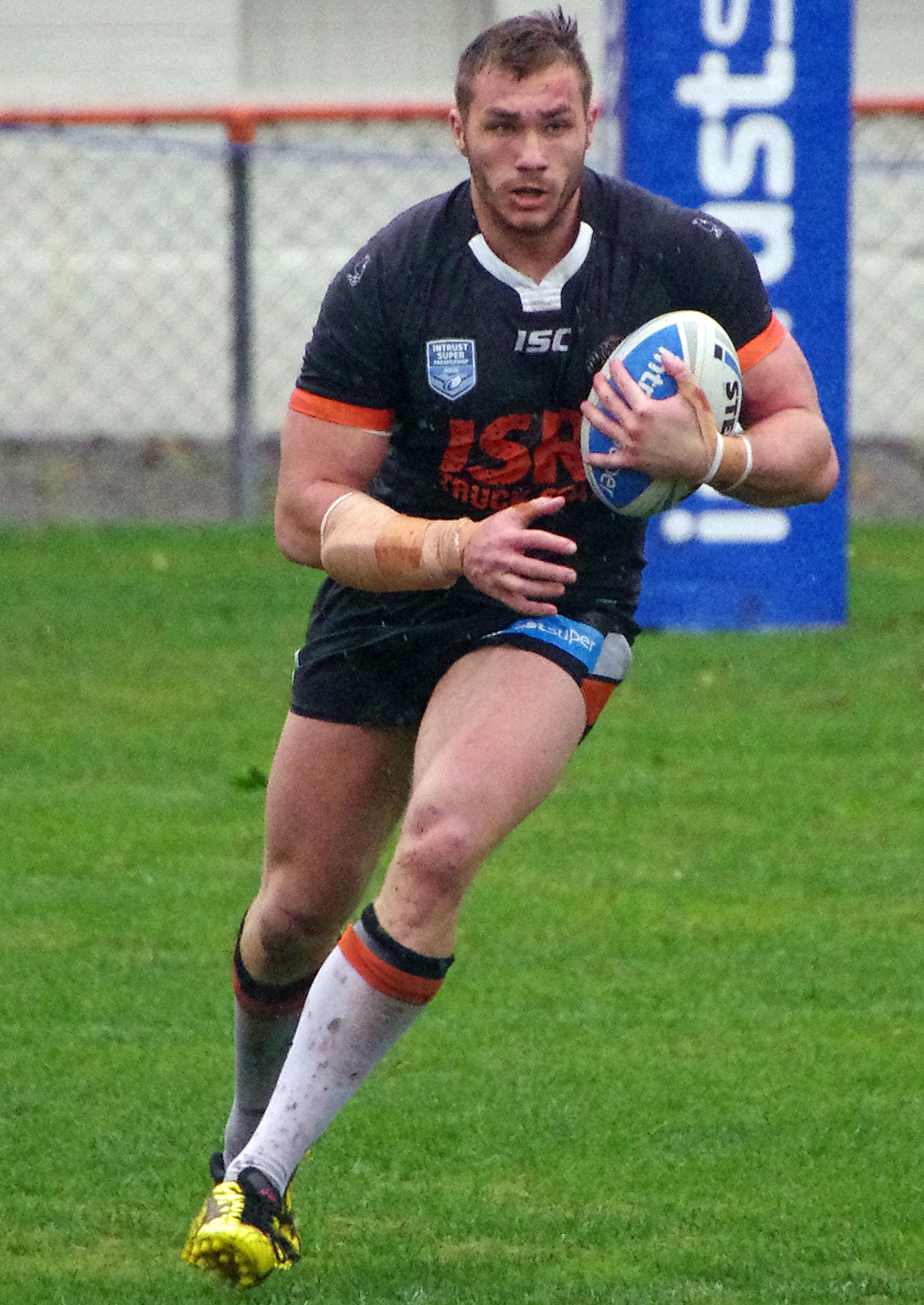

Personal information
- Full name: Jordan Grant
- Born: 15 August 1994 (age 31) Penrith, New South Wales, Australia
- Height: 190 cm (6 ft 3 in)
- Weight: 109 kg (17 st 2 lb)

Playing information
- Position: Prop
Club
Years	Team	Pld	T	G	FG	P
2021–23	Melbourne Storm	7	0	0	0	0
Representative
Years	Team	Pld	T	G	FG	P
2016	Serbia	2	0	0	0	0
2024	Indigenous All Stars	1	0	0	0	0
- Source: As of 4 June 2023

Jordan Grant (born 15 August 1994) is an Australian professional rugby league footballer who previously played as a prop for the Melbourne Storm in the National Rugby League (NRL) until the end of the 2023 season.

== Early life ==
Grant was born in Penrith, New South Wales, and is of Bosnian and Aboriginal descent. He was educated at St Dominic's College, Penrith.

He played junior rugby league for the St Clair Comets, before signing with Penrith Panthers.

== Playing career ==
=== Early career ===
Grant was a part of the Penrith Panthers junior development system. He then played in the NRL Under-20s for the Parramatta Eels in 2013, and the Wests Tigers in 2014.

In 2016, Grant was named player of the year for the Tigers' New South Wales Cup team. He represented Serbia in their 2017 World Cup qualifying fixtures in October 2016.

In 2018, Grant moved to Queensland, playing for the Mackay Cutters in the Queensland Cup, living with teammates Nicho Hynes and Aaron Booth. After a year in Mackay, Grant transferred to the Redcliffe Dolphins in 2019.

=== Melbourne Storm ===
Grant signed with the Brisbane Tigers in the Queensland Cup ahead of the 2021 season.

In round 18 of the 2021 NRL season, Grant made his debut for the Melbourne club against the Newcastle Knights where they won 48–4.

Limited to just three NRL appearances for Melbourne in 2022, Grant played 12 of a possible 19 matches for the Brisbane Tigers, winning the club's best and fairest award. In 2023 Grant started at prop in the Tigers 22-18 grand final victory over the Burleigh Bears.
