= Ryley Jacks =

Canada international rugby league footballer

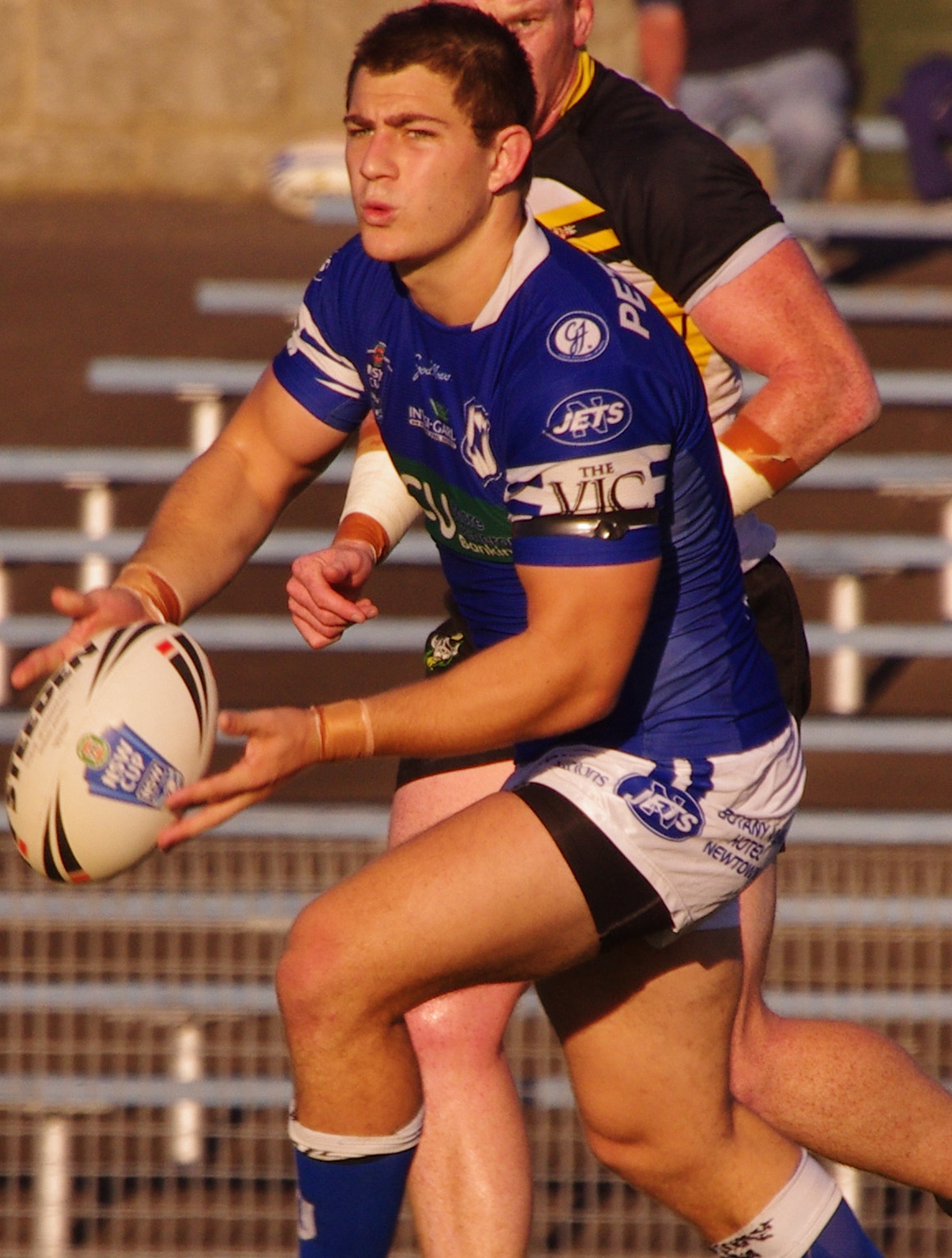

Personal information
- Born: 2 June 1992 (age 34) Brisbane, Queensland, Australia
- Height: 184 cm (6 ft 0 in)
- Weight: 92 kg (14 st 7 lb)

Playing information
- Position: Five-eighth, Halfback
Club
Years	Team	Pld	T	G	FG	P
2017–18	Melbourne Storm	25	6	0	0	24
2019	Gold Coast Titans	13	5	0	0	16
2020–21	Melbourne Storm	10	1	0	0	4
2022	Featherstone Rovers	29	19	0	0	76
2023	Brisbane Tigers	23	3	0	2	4
	Total	100	34	0	2	124
Representative
Years	Team	Pld	T	G	FG	P
2015	Canada	2	4	0	0	16
- Source: As of 18 July 2022
- Education: St Laurence's College
- Relatives: Rhys Jacks (brother)

Ryley Jacks (born 2 June 1992) is a Canada international rugby league footballer who last played as a halfback, five-eighth for Brisbane Tigers in the Queensland Cup.

Jacks previously played for the Gold Coast Titans and the Melbourne Storm in the NRL, and Featherstone Rovers in the RFL Championship.

== Early life ==
Jacks was born in Brisbane, Queensland, Australia. He is of Canadian descent. His parents Terry and Donna both captained Australia in Touch Football, and Terry played A grade for Brothers Old Boys Rugby Club in the Queensland Rugby Union A grade competition.

Ryley was educated at St Laurence's College, South Brisbane where he was named Sportsman of the Year in 2009. However, Jacks stated in a 2022 interview that despite his achievements during his schooling years, he often felt a sense of “not being enough”, leading to mental health issues of a young age.

== Playing career ==
=== Early career ===
Jacks played 49 games for the Sydney Roosters NRL Under-20s team in 2011 and 2012. In 2013, he played for the Newtown Jets, the Roosters' feeder team, in the New South Wales Cup. After starting the 2014 season with the Easts Tigers in the Queensland Cup, Jacks signed with the Gold Coast Titans in March to play for their feeder team, the Burleigh Bears, also in the Queensland Cup. Eligible via his Toronto-born grandfather, Jacks was selected to represent Canada in their 2017 World Cup qualifying campaign in December 2015 alongside his brother Rhys. He scored one try in their match against Jamaica, and three tries against the United States.

In 2016, Jacks played for the Sunshine Coast Falcons, a feeder team of the Melbourne Storm, in the Queensland Cup. With 19 tries for the season, he was awarded the James Ackerman Medal as the Falcons' player of the year. Jacks has played over 140 games in both the NSW/QLD Cup competitions.

=== Melbourne Storm: 2016–2018 ===
In September 2016, Jacks signed a one-year deal with Melbourne for the 2017 NRL season. In February 2017, he was a member of the Storm's 18-man squad for the 2017 NRL Auckland Nines.

Jacks made his NRL debut in round 1 of the 2017 season, against the Canterbury-Bankstown Bulldogs on 3 March. In his 12 matches for Melbourne, he was described statistically as the best defensive five-eighth in the NRL. Jacks was 18th man in the 2017 Grand Final win over the North Queensland Cowboys.

In June 2017, Jacks extended his contract with the Storm until the end of 2018. He was on the extended bench for the 2018 Grand Final loss to the Sydney Roosters.

=== Gold Coast Titans: 2019 ===
For the 2019 NRL season, Jacks signed on with the Gold Coast Titans for two seasons. Jacks made a total of 13 appearances for the Gold Coast in the 2019 NRL season as the club endured a horror year on and off the field. During the halfway mark of the season, head coach Garth Brennan was sacked by the club after a string of poor results.

The Gold Coast managed to win only four games for the entire season and finished last claiming the wooden spoon.

=== Melbourne Storm: 2020–2021 ===
Jacks left the Gold Coast at the end of the 2019 season to return to Melbourne on a one-year deal, he was then resigned until the end of the 2021 season as a back up half to Cameron Munster and Jahrome Hughes.

Jacks was on the extended bench for the Storm's 2020 NRL Grand Final win over the Penrith Panthers.

Jacks made only one appearance for Melbourne in the 2021 NRL season. On 6 October 2021, he was released by the club.

=== Featherstone Rovers: 2022 ===
Jacks was signed by RFL Championship team Featherstone Rovers for the 2022 season, after originally signing to return to the Brisbane Tigers. On 28 May 2022, Jacks played for Featherstone in their 2022 RFL 1895 Cup final loss against Leigh.

Following Featherstone's failed push for promotion to Super League, Jacks was released and returned to the Brisbane Tigers, where he was appointed captain for the 2023 Queensland Cup season. Jacks then went onto led the Tigers in their 22–18 win over Burleigh in the 2023 Queensland Cup grand final.
