= Brandon Smith (rugby league) =

NZ & Maori international rugby league footballer

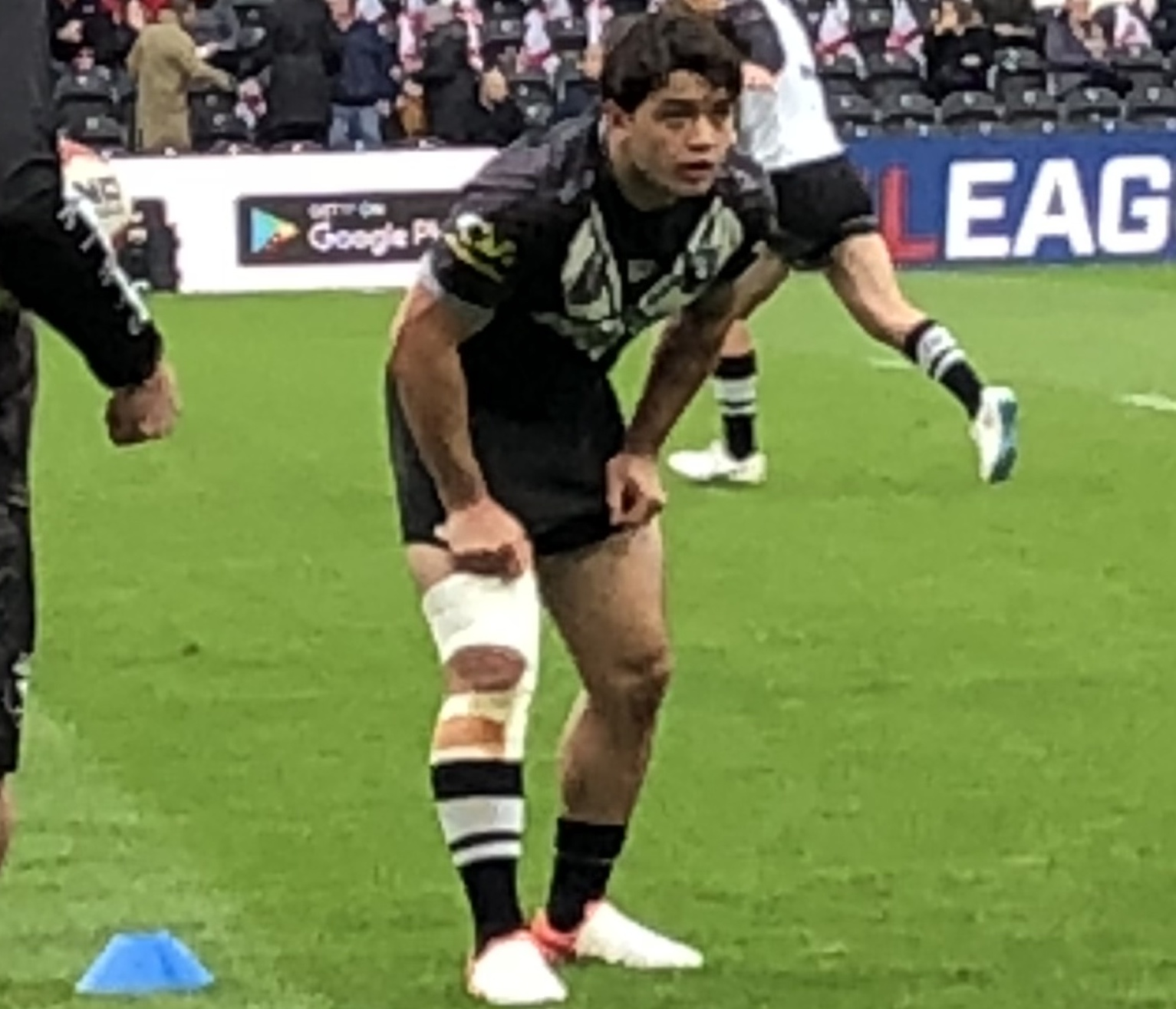

Personal information
- Full name: Brandon Timothy Smith
- Born: 31 May 1996 (age 30) Waiheke Island, New Zealand
- Height: 180 cm (5 ft 11 in)
- Weight: 98 kg (15 st 6 lb)

Playing information
- Position: Hooker, Lock
Club
Years	Team	Pld	T	G	FG	P
2017–22	Melbourne Storm	107	22	0	0	88
2023–24	Sydney Roosters	41	5	0	0	20
2025–	South Sydney	22	3	0	0	12
	Total	170	30	0	0	120
Representative
Years	Team	Pld	T	G	FG	P
2018–22	New Zealand	13	4	0	0	16
2019–24	Māori All Stars	3	2	0	0	8
- Source: As of 11 September 2026

Brandon Smith (born 31 May 1996) is a New Zealand professional rugby league footballer who plays as a hooker and lock for the South Sydney Rabbitohs in the National Rugby League (NRL), and for New Zealand and the New Zealand Māori at international level.

Smith previously played for the Melbourne Storm with whom he won the 2020 NRL Grand Final.

== Early life ==
Smith was born in Waiheke Island, New Zealand, and is of Norwegian and Māori descent.

He played his junior rugby league for the Waiheke Rams and Bay Roskill Young Guns in New Zealand.

He moved to Townsville as a teenager because his older brother Dylan Smith had an under 20s contract with the North Queensland Cowboys. In Townsville, he was educated at Kirwan State High School, Townsville where he played school-level football. He continued playing junior league with Centrals Tigers and Brothers in Townsville.

== Playing career ==
Smith played for the North Queensland Cowboys in the National Youth Competition for two seasons, playing 44 games and scoring 30 tries. Smith had initially been sacked by the North Queensland club after an off-field incident where he punched a police officer but was re-signed six months later after impressing for Wynnum Manly in the Mal Meninga Cup. In May 2016, he played for the 2016 Junior Kiwis against the Junior Kangaroos. In September 2016, he was named at hooker in the Team of the Year. He signed a three-year contract with the Melbourne Storm in the following month.

=== 2017 ===
On 30 April, Smith was named in the New Zealand national team's 20-man squad for the 2017 Anzac Test.

He made his NRL debut for the Melbourne Storm against the Knights in round 13, scoring a try. On 24 July, he signed a major contract extension with Melbourne, tying him to the club until the end of 2022, with the intention of his becoming Cameron Smith's replacement as hooker.

=== 2018 ===
At the beginning of the season he was part of the Melbourne Storm victorious 2018 World Club Challenge Team. In round 23, against the Eels, Smith demonstrated his gritty character by playing a vital role for his depleted team, displaying determination to win with an injured knee. Brandon was also part of the Melbourne Storm team that played in the 2018 NRL Grand Final.

On 13 October, Smith made his international debut for the New Zealand Kiwis against the Australian Kangaroos in Auckland.

=== 2019 ===
Smith played 23 games for Melbourne in the 2019 NRL season as the club finished as runaway minor premiers. Smith played in the club's preliminary final loss to the Sydney Roosters at the Sydney Cricket Ground.

=== 2020 ===
Smith was selected as a part of the Māori All Stars winning team on the Gold Coast at the NRL All-Stars Match. He was awarded the Preston Campbell Medal for his two tries man of the match performance. After the game it was revealed that Smith had suffered a facial fracture and was ruled out for 4–6 weeks. On 2 July, in Round 8 of the Telstra Premiership, Smith played his 50th NRL game on Thursday Night Football against the Sydney Roosters. Smith started at hooker for the game. He finished the season victorious playing off the bench in the 2020 NRL Grand Final against Penrith.

=== 2021 ===
Smith played a total of 24 games for Melbourne in the 2021 NRL season as the club won 19 matches in a row and claimed the Minor Premiership. Smith played in all three finals matches including the preliminary final where Melbourne suffered a shock 10-6 loss against eventual premiers Penrith.

In September 2021, a video was leaked to the media which showed Smith along with Melbourne teammates Cameron Munster and Chris Lewis partying while Smith was taking an illicit substance which was alleged to be cocaine. Smith was handed a $50,000 suspended fine, a one match suspension and he was removed from Melbourne's emerging leadership group.

In November 2021, Smith was placed under heavy scrutiny for comments he made while being a guest on the YKTR podcast. When being interviewed Smith stated he dreamed of winning a premiership in a Sydney Roosters jersey even though he was still contracted with Melbourne for the 2022 season. Smith also claimed the Melbourne club had a big drinking culture and named several teammates being involved in drunken behaviour. Smith was later placed under investigation by the NRL Integrity Unit over his appearance on the podcast.

On the 17 December, Smith officially signed with the Sydney Roosters, on a three-year deal starting in 2023.

=== 2022 ===
In round 1 of the 2022 NRL season, Smith was taken from the field with an injury early in the first half of the club's match against the Wests Tigers. It was later announced that Smith would be ruled out for a month with a broken hand.

In round 16 of the season, Smith played his 100th NRL game in Melbourne's 36-30 loss against Manly.

The following week, Smith was sent to the sin bin for dissent during Melbourne's 28-6 loss against Cronulla. As Smith left the field following his dismissal, he became involved in a verbal altercation with Cronulla supporters.

On 12 July, Smith was suspended for three matches over the incident.

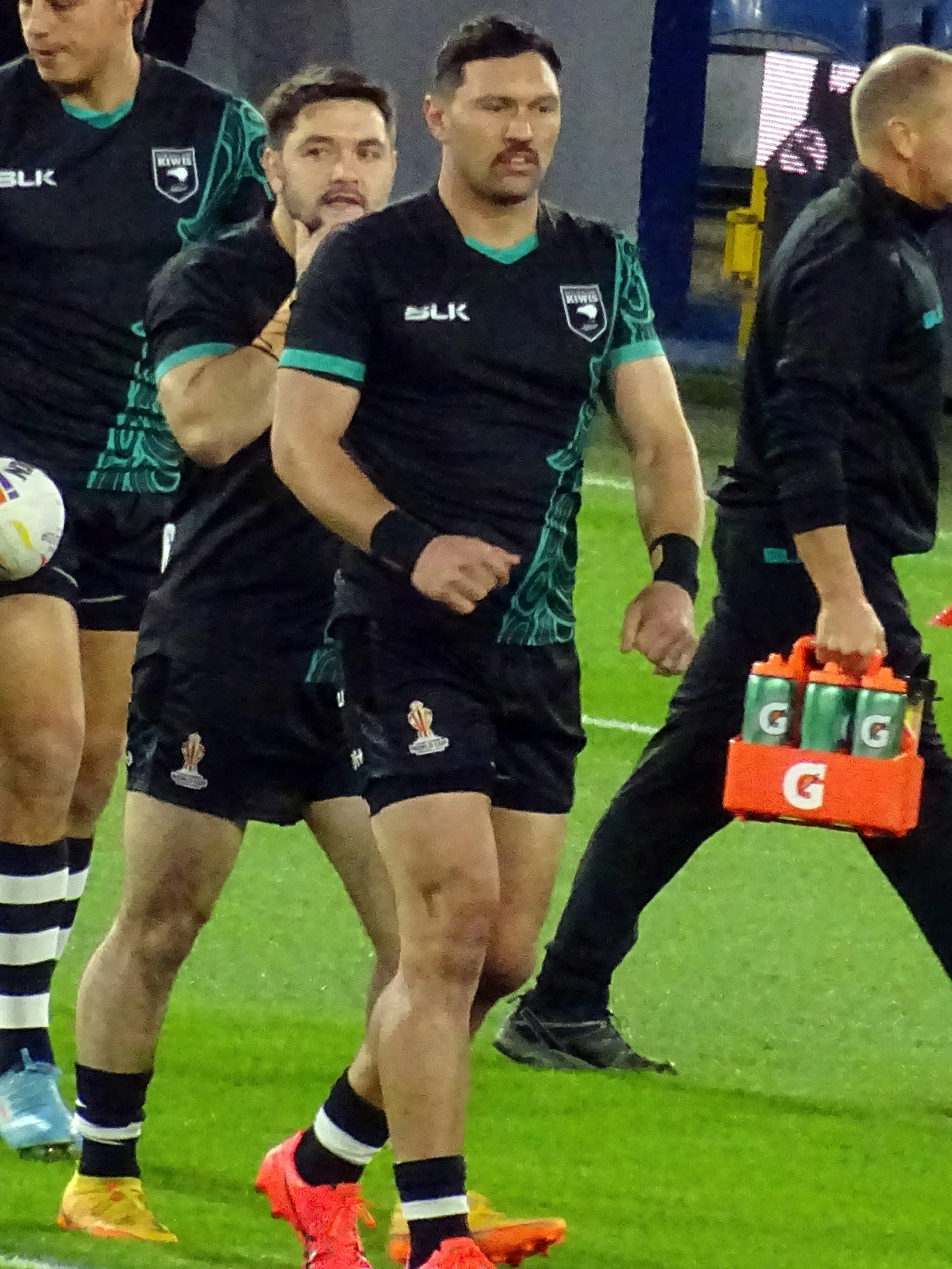
Smith behind Jordan Rapana warming up for New Zealand in 2022

In October, Smith was named in the New Zealand squad for the 2021 Rugby League World Cup.

=== 2023 ===
In round 1 of the 2023 NRL season, Smith made his club debut for the Sydney Roosters as they suffered a shock loss to the newly admitted Dolphins team. Smith played a total of 21 games for the club as they qualified for the finals. Smith played in the Sydney Roosters elimination semi-final loss against Melbourne where he scored a try.

=== 2024 ===
On 21 May, the Sydney Roosters hit back at claims that Smith had been taking illegal substances on a live stream along with fellow players Terrell May, Zach Dockar-Clay, Naufahu Whyte and Spencer Leniu. The club released a statement which read "The Sydney Roosters have been made aware of a small clip from a longer live stream that some on social media have claimed identifies behaviour that breaches NRL rules. The clip reveals no use of illicit substances or any other breach of NRL rules, however some see fit to make that grossly distorted and clearly damaging claim". On 10 June, it was reported that the Sydney Roosters had issued Smith with a breach notice in relation to him missing a mandatory mid-season review session. During the Sydney Roosters round 26 loss against Canberra, Smith was taken from the field after suffering both an ACL and MCL injury. Smith was later ruled out for an indefinite period.

Smith experienced his longest career sideline stint, nine weeks, during his time at the Sydney Roosters due to injury. He noted that he was already facing scrutiny for his performance prior to the injury, but upon his return, he began to put together more satisfactory performances.

=== 2025 ===
On 19 March, the South Sydney Rabbitohs announced that they had signed Smith for the 2026-27 seasons. On 7 May, Smith commented publicly on his exit from the Sydney Roosters through the Bye Round Podcast. Smith said “Something has happened overnight and my manager rang me this morning and sort of just told me, Everything I’ve read so far, it doesn’t seem like I’m very wanted, “It’s going to be hard to go into training. It’s going to be a weird feeling. I still have to do that. I’m training with the reserve grade side this week, Things have been happening in the background but I haven’t been part of the negotiations. It’s not going to happen overnight. No one is answering their phone at the moment as well". It was reported that South Sydney were willing to pay $180,000 to enact a release clause which would allow Smith to join the club in 2025 and not 2026. On 13 May, Smith was officially released by the Sydney Roosters. Smith debuted for the South Sydney club in round 18, but was taken from the field after injuring his knee again, he was later ruled out for 4-6 weeks after tearing his MCL. Smith made his return to the South Sydney side in their round 23 "Spoon Bowl" match victory against the Gold Coast. On 26 August, Smith was charged by Queensland Police with allegedly supplying dangerous drugs and using or disclosing inside knowledge for betting. Smith was originally questioned by police on 10 August but was released without charge. Smith was ordered to appear at Southport Magistrates Court on 18 September. On 18 September, Smith's case was adjourned to the 9 October. It was reported that Smith remained silent in court and did not enter a plea. On 9 October 2025, Smith's case was adjourned to the 4 December after the court was awaiting a brief of evidence.

=== 2026 ===
On 2 October 2026, South Sydney announced with had re-signed with the club until the end of 2028. Smith played 17 matches for South Sydney in the 2026 NRL season as the club finished 6th on the table and qualified for the finals.

== Statistics ==
Year	Team	Games	Tries	Pts
2017	Melbourne Storm	3	2	8
2018	Melbourne Storm	18		
2019	Melbourne Storm	23	3	12
2020	Melbourne Storm	18	3	12
2021	Melbourne Storm	24	11	44
2022	Melbourne Storm	21	3	12
2023	Sydney Roosters	21	3	8
2024	Sydney Roosters	20	2	8
2025	South Sydney Rabbitohs	4		
2026	South Sydney Rabbitohs	3		
	Totals	156	27	108

== Honours ==
Individual

- Melbourne Storm Rookie of the Year: 2018
- Preston Campbell Medal: 2020
- Melbourne Storm Forward of the Year: 2020
- Melbourne Storm Forward of the Year: 2021
- Dally M Hooker of the Year: 2021

Club

- 2019 Minor Premiership Winners
- 2020 NRL Grand Final Winners
- 2021 Minor Premiership Winners
