= Christian Welch =

Australian rugby league footballer

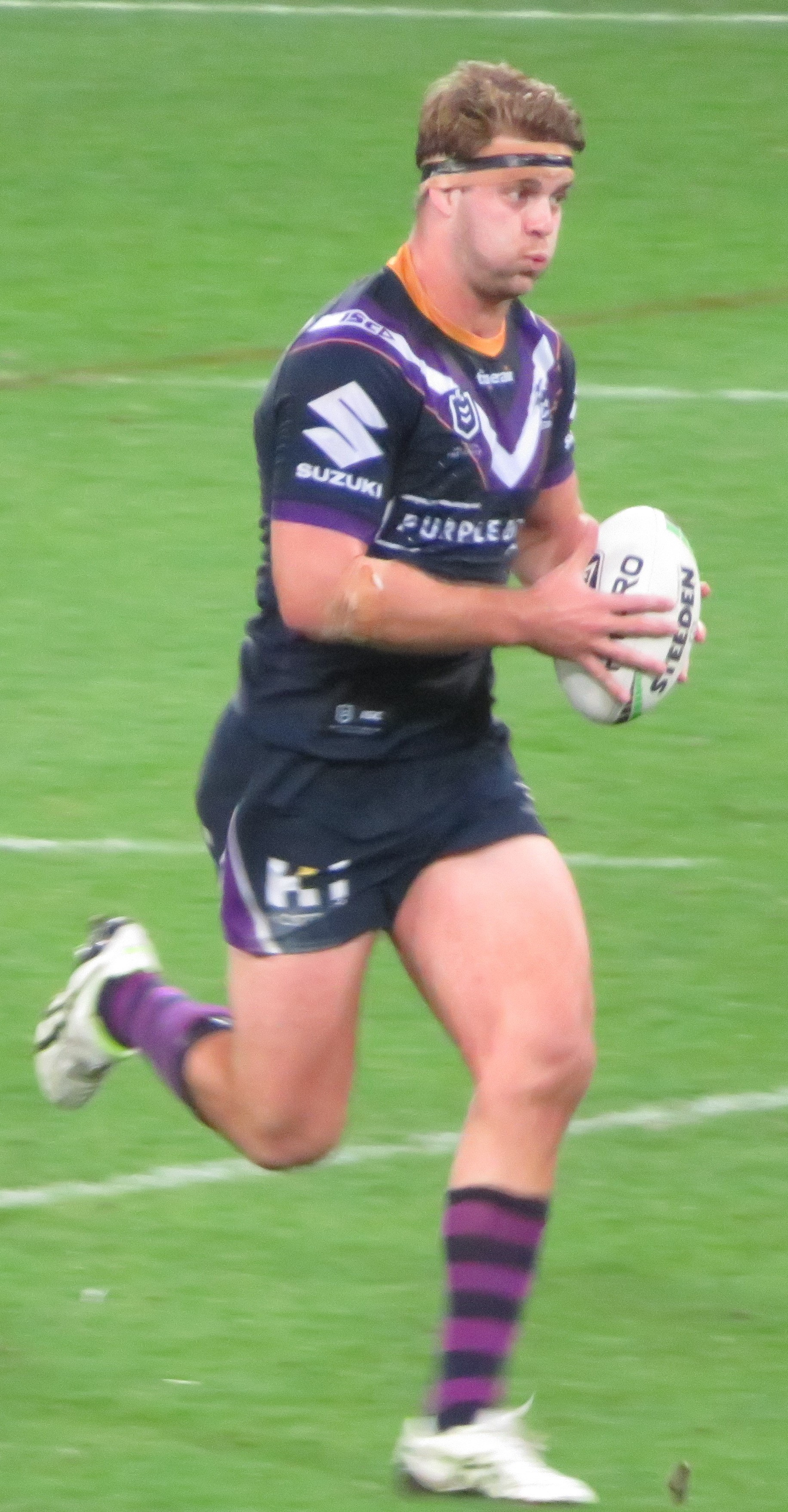

Personal information
- Born: 19 July 1994 (age 32) Sydney, New South Wales, Australia
- Height: 195 cm (6 ft 5 in)
- Weight: 110 kg (17 st 5 lb)

Playing information
- Position: Prop
Club
| Years | Team | Pld | T | G | FG | P |
|---|---|---|---|---|---|---|
| 2015–24 | Melbourne Storm | 163 | 7 | 0 | 0 | 28 |
Representative
| Years | Team | Pld | T | G | FG | P |
| 2019–21 | Queensland | 6 | 0 | 0 | 0 | 0 |
- Source: As of 6 October 2024

Christian Welch (born 19 July 1994) is an Australian former professional rugby league footballer who last played as a prop for the Melbourne Storm in the National Rugby League (NRL).

He was a NRL premiership winning player of 2020 and played for Queensland in the 2019 State of Origin series.

== Early life ==
Welch was born in Sydney and moved to Townsville at a young age where he began playing hockey. He has one older brother, Brendan, and a younger sister, Lauren, his mother Lyn and father John. His family relocated to Gladstone before settling in Brisbane. When settled in Brisbane, Welch was educated at Villanova College, an Augustinian education for boys. Once graduating high school he attended University of Queensland studying Commerce.

He played his junior rugby league for the Eastern Suburbs Tigers and Gladstone Brothers, before being signed by the Melbourne Storm.

In 2013 and 2014, Welch played for the Melbourne Storm's NYC team. On 3 May 2014, he played for the Queensland under-20s team against the New South Wales under-20s team. While living in Melbourne he continued his studies at University of Melbourne.

== Playing career ==
=== 2015 ===
Welch made his debut in round 9 of the 2015 NRL season for the Melbourne Storm against Parramatta. He came on in the second half and played the final 25 minutes to help seal a 28-10 victory away from home. The 21-year old went on to make another nine first grade appearances for the season.

=== 2016 ===
In his second season, Welch averaged 22 minutes over 17 games, he ranked second at the club for offloads behind Jesse Bromwich. On 22 April, Welch was re-signed by the Melbourne club on a one-year contract. On 2 October 2016, he played in the 2016 NRL Grand Final loss to the Cronulla-Sutherland Sharks.

=== 2017 ===
Welch played eight of the first nine games for Melbourne Storm, averaging career highs in metres run and tackles per game. Unfortunately it all came to an abrupt halt when he suffered an anterior cruciate ligament (ACL) knee injury against the St. George Illawarra Dragons in Round 9. He was forced to have a knee reconstruction, denying him of a chance to play in Melbourne's 2017 NRL Grand Final victory.

=== 2018 ===
Christian started the season with victory against the Leeds Rhinos in World Club Challenge. He was drafted into Queensland State of Origin camp ahead of Game 2 in Sydney, but did not play. He was also part of the Melbourne team that played in the 2018 NRL Grand Final.

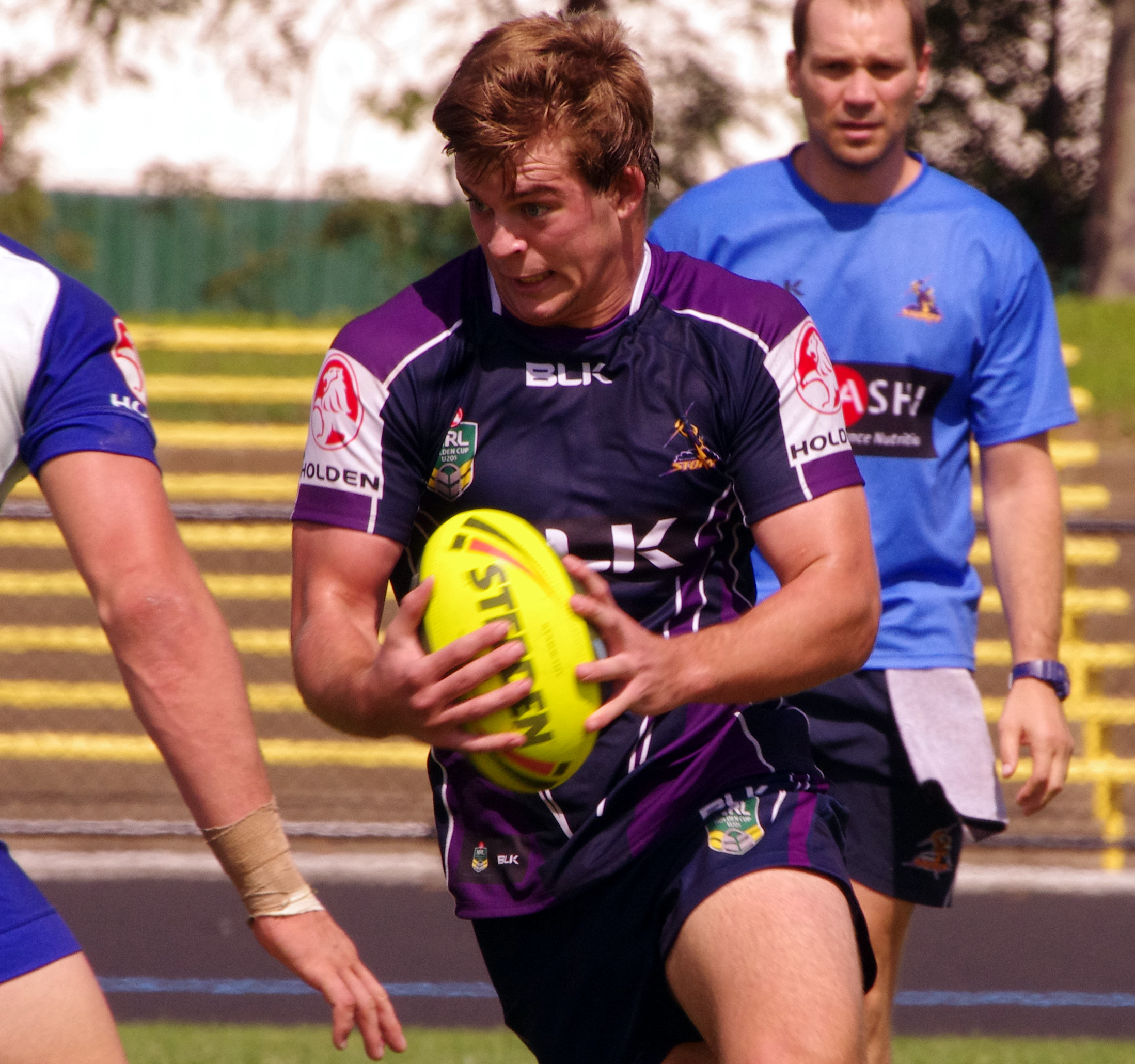
Welch playing in the NRL Under-20s in 2014.

=== 2019 ===
Welch made his State of Origin debut for Queensland in game 3. Welch played a total of 16 games for Melbourne in the 2019 NRL season as the club claimed the Minor Premiership. In 2021, Welch revealed that he was close to signing with Parrramatta at the end of 2019 but after suffering an ACL injury against Brisbane, the Parramatta club removed the offer.

=== 2020 ===
Welch was third time lucky playing in Melbourne's 2020 NRL Grand Final win over Penrith in a 26-20 win. Welch played in games 1 and 3 of Queensland’s shock series victory in the 2020 State of Origin series.

=== 2021 ===
Welch played a total of 21 games for Melbourne in the 2021 NRL season as the club won 19 matches in a row and claimed the Minor Premiership. Welch played in two finals matches including the preliminary final where Melbourne suffered a 10-6 loss against eventual premiers Penrith.

=== 2022 ===
In round 1 of the 2022 NRL season, Welch was taken from the field during the clubs match against the Wests Tigers. It was later announced that Welch would be ruled out for the remainder of the season after suffering a torn Achilles.

=== 2023 ===
Welch played 25 games for Melbourne in the 2023 NRL season including all three finals matches as the club were defeated by Penrith in the preliminary final.

=== 2024 ===
On 21 August 2024, Welch was inducted as a life member of the Melbourne Storm. Welch played a total of 20 matches for Melbourne in the 2024 NRL season as the club finished as minor premiers. Welch played in Melbourne's 2024 NRL Grand Final loss against Penrith.

=== 2025 ===
On 12 February, Welch announced he had retired prior to the start of the 2025 season citing ongoing back issues which were affecting his every day life. Just the day before announcing his retirement, Welch had been absent from the team photo due to suffering a concussion during pre-season training.

== Statistics ==
| Year | Team | Games | Tries | Pts |
|---|---|---|---|---|
| 2015 | Melbourne Storm | 10 | | |
| 2016 | Melbourne Storm | 17 | | |
| 2017 | Melbourne Storm | 8 | | |
| 2018 | Melbourne Storm | 26 | 2 | 8 |
| 2019 | Melbourne Storm | 16 | 1 | 4 |
| 2020 | Melbourne Storm | 19 | | |
| 2021 | Melbourne Storm | 21 | 2 | 8 |
| 2022 | Melbourne Storm | 1 | | |
| 2023 | Melbourne Storm | 25 | 2 | 8 |
| 2024 | Melbourne Storm | 20 | | |
| | Totals | 163 | 7 | 28 |

== Honours ==
Team

- 2016 NRL Grand Final Grand Finalists
- 2018 World Club Challenge Winners
- 2018 NRL Grand Final Grand Finalists
- 2020 NRL Grand Final Premiers
- 2020 State of Origin series Champions
- 2024 Melbourne Storm Life Member
