= 2014 Melbourne Storm season =

- NRL Rank: 6th
- Play-off result: 7th - Elimination Final Loss
- 2014 record: Wins: 14; draws: 0; losses: 10
- Points scored: For: 536; against: 460

Team information
- CEO: Mark Evans
- Coach: Craig Bellamy
- Captain: Cameron Smith (23 games) Ryan Hinchcliffe (1 game) Cooper Cronk (1 game)
- Stadium: AAMI Park – 30,050
- Avg. attendance: 14,894
- High attendance: 28,716 (Round 8) (Note: Regular season home games only)

Top scorers
- Tries: Sisa Waqa (18)
- Goals: Cameron Smith (68)
- Points: Cameron Smith (145)
← 2013	List of seasons	2015 →

The 2014 Melbourne Storm season was the 17th in the club's history. They competed in the 2014 NRL season and were coached by Craig Bellamy and captained by Cameron Smith. In 2014 the Storm struggled to achieve consistent success, however won enough games late in the season to qualify for the NRL finals in 6th place. The club finished outside the top four for the first time since 2005 (other than when competition points were stripped in 2010). It was a roller coaster campaign that kicked off with consecutive one-point wins, courtesy of field goals from Smith and Cooper Cronk. Five of the club's wins during season came at a combined 17 points. Injuries to Cronk (broken arm) and Billy Slater (shoulder) during the Origin period saw the Storm lose four of six games during that stretch, as they were left clinging to eighth spot on the NRL ladder. The team managed to steady the ship by winning six of their last eight regular season games to finish sixth.

In a significant boost for the club, captain Cameron Smith signed a four-year contract extension just one week into the season.

== Season summary ==
- Pre-season – New recruits took part in Melbourne Storm IDQ camp for pre season training before New Years. Matt Duffie was awarded the IDQ Iron bar with special recognition to both Justin O'Neill and Kenny Bromwich.
- Auckland Nines – The club competed in the inaugural Auckland Nines tournament on the weekend of the 15th and 16 February. After losing two of three pool games they failed to progress to the finals of the tournament. Ryan Hoffman captained the squad.
- Round 1 – The Storm opened their season with a golden point extra time win over the Manly Warringah Sea Eagles. Cameron Smith kicked the winning field goal. Smith also equaled the Storm games record in the match. George Rose, Ben Roberts and Young Tonumaipea all made their debuts for the Storm. The victory also meant the Storm won their season opener for the 10th successive year.
- 11 March – Cameron Smith officially announces that he has signed a four-year contract which will see him end his NRL career at the Storm.
- Round 2 – Cameron Smith played his 263rd game for the Storm breaking the club record held by Matt Geyer. Also, Billy Slater played his 250th match for the club.
- 18 March – Jesse Bromwich commits to the Storm by signing a new four year playing contract.
- Round 5 – Dayne Weston makes his playing debut for the Storm.
- Round 6 – The Storm score a try after the siren to secure a 28–24 victory over the St George Illawarra Dragons. The Dragons had led 24–10 with 13 minutes left on the clock.
- Round 8 – ANZAC Day In front of a record NRL crowd of 28,716 at AAMI Park the Storm go down to the New Zealand Warriors 16–10. The Warriors taking home the Michael Moore Trophy in the only meeting between the teams for the season.
- Round 9 – Kurt Mann makes his debut for the Storm scoring the winning try in a 22–19 win over Manly.
- Round 10 - Craig Bellamy coached his 300th NRL game and Joel Romelo made his playing debut for the club. In addition when Cameron Smith, Billy Slater, Ryan Hoffman and Cooper Cronk ran out against South Sydney, it was the first time in NRL history four players of the same side had played a combined total of 1000 games.
- 29 May – Both Kevin Proctor and Young Tonumaipea sign new playing contacts with the Storm.
- 30 May – Cooper Cronk breaks his arm in the first State of Origin game ruling him out for 12 weeks. Billy Slater and Cameron Smith also suffered injuries in the game but Smith was able to follow up in the round 12 game against the North Queensland Cowboys.
- Round 15 – Melbourne Storm returned to form with their biggest win of the season thus far 46–20 over the Parramatta Eels. Billy Slater also moved to equal third on the all–time NRL try scorers list with Andrew Ettingshausen.
- Late June – The Storm sign Fijian Marika Koroibete from the West Tigers just before the 30 June deadline. Koroibete is noted as one of the fastest players in the NRL and made his impact straight away scoring tries in the Storm's wins over Canberra and Brisbane. This followed the news that Sisa Waqa would depart for the Canberra Raiders and the end of the season and Mitch Garbutt would depart for the Brisbane Broncos.
- 10 July – Injured Storm utility Slade Griffin and young outside back Hymel Hunt are both suspended for two matches after they were named among five players found to have gambled on NRL matches in breach of the league's gambling policy.
- Round 19 – The Storm return to the winners list with a 28–14 win over Canberra, with Mahe Fonua scoring his second double of the season.
- Round 22 – Newcastle score two converted tries in the final 3 minutes of the game to snatch victory 32–30. Sisa Waqa scores a Storm season record of 4 tries in the game, he also equals the club record for most tries in a game.
- Round 25 – Cooper Cronk plays his 250th NRL game.
- Round 26 – The Storm defeat the Brisbane Broncos ensuring they qualify for the 2014 NRL Finals Series.
- Finals Week 1 – Following the conclusion of Round 26, the Storm finished in sixth place meaning they were drawn against the Canterbury Bulldogs in an Elimination Final in Week 1 of the Finals Series the Storm's higher placing than Canterbury ensured it was played at home. The Storm ultimately lost the Elimination Final 28–4 ending their season. Ryan Hoffman also played his final game with the Storm before joining the Warriors.

=== Milestone games ===
Round	Player	Milestone
Round 1	Young Tonumaipea	NRL debut
Round 1	George Rose	Storm debut
Round 1	Ben Roberts	Storm debut
Round 2	Cameron Smith	263rd Storm game (Storm Record)
Round 2	Billy Slater	250th game
Round 5	Dayne Weston	Storm debut
Round 9	Kurt Mann	NRL debut
Round 10	Craig Bellamy	300th NRL game as coach
Round 10	Joel Romelo	Storm debut
Round 12	Cameron Munster	NRL debut
Round 19	Marika Koroibete	Storm debut
Round 25	Cooper Cronk	250th game

=== Jerseys ===
For the 2014 season, sportswear company KooGa completed their rebrand to BLK, releasing a similar home jersey design for the Storm as the 2013 version, with the main difference being the addition of purple shoulder panels. The away jersey was also similar to the 2013 version, worn with white shorts.

After initially not re-signing with the club as main jersey advertiser, Crown Resorts modified their logo on the jerseys to read "Crown Resorts". For the first match of the season, this logo was gold in a black box (similar to the application of their logo on the South Sydney Rabbitohs jersey), before reverting to a white logo inside a navy blue box to match the Melbourne Storm colours.

Special

- Round 8 – Added ANZAC Appeal logo with text "Storm vs Warriors" in the centre of the chest.
- Round 9 – A "Women in League" design that featured a pink and purple gradient with thin blue hoops and side panels.
- Round 13 – Storm wore a heritage jersey design, which was replica of the club's 1999 blue jersey, with wide gold collars.
- Round 23 – For the NRL's Indigenous Round, Melbourne wore an updated version of the club's 2012 Indigenous jersey designed by Lenny Briggs and Dixon Patten. The 2014 version featured more purple than the original version, but was still mostly orange.

=== Attendance averages ===
	Total	Matches	Average
Home	178,728	12	14,894
Away	166,547	12	13,879
All regular season games	345,275	24	14,386
Finals	19,230	1	19,230
All Games	364,505	25	14,580

== Fixtures ==
=== Preseason ===
- (BP) - Bonus point try

Date	Rd	Opponent	Venue	Result	Mel.	Opp.	Tries	Goals	Field goals	Ref
8 February	Trial 1	Canberra Raiders	AAMI Park, Melbourne	Lost	12	20	K Proctor, Y Tonumaipea, H Hunt			
15 February	Auckland Nines; Pool Game	Penrith Panthers	Eden Park, Auckland, New Zealand	Lost	11	14	W Chambers, C Munster (BP)	C Munster		
15 February	Auckland Nines; Pool Game	South Sydney Rabbitohs	Eden Park, Auckland, New Zealand	Won	18	10	W Chambers (2 (BPx1)), M Fonua (BP)	W Chambers, S Waqa		
16 February	Auckland Nines; Pool Game	St George Illawarra Dragons	Eden Park, Auckland, New Zealand	Lost	10	14	M Garbutt, M Fonua	S Waqa		
22 February	Trial 2	Eastern Suburbs Tigers	Langlands Park, Brisbane	Lost	12	16				
23 February	Trial 3	Canterbury-Bankstown Bulldogs	Suncorp Stadium, Brisbane	Lost	10	20	M Fonua, K Bromwich	C Smith 1/2		

=== Regular season ===
==== Result by round ====
Round	1	2	3	4	5	6	7	8	9	10	11	12	13	14	15	16	17	18	19	20	21	22	23	24	25	26
Ground	A	H	H	A	A	H	A	H	H	A	–	A	H	A	H	A	–	H	H	A	A	A	H	A	A	H
Result	W	W	W	L	L	W	L	L	W	W	B	L	L	W	W	L	B	L	W	W	W	L	W	W	L	W
Position	8	3	2	5	9	6	9	10	8	5	5	9	9	9	7	9	8	8	8	6	6	7	5	5	6	6
Points	2	4	6	6	6	8	8	8	10	12	14	14	14	16	18	18	20	20	22	24	26	26	28	30	30	32

Source: Rugby League Tables
A = Away; H = Home; N = Neutral; B = Bye; W = Win; D = Draw; L = Loss

==== Matches ====
- (g.p.) – Golden Point extra time
- (pen) – Penalty try

Date	Rd	Opponent	Venue	Result	Mel.	Opp.	Tries	Goals	Field goals	Ref
8 March	1	Manly Warringah Sea Eagles	Brookvale Oval, Sydney	Won (g.p.)	23	22	S Waqa (2), B Hampton, K Bromwich	C Smith 3/7	C Smith 1/1	
15 March	2	Penrith Panthers	AAMI Park, Melbourne	Won	18	17	K Proctor, M Fonua, S Waqa	C Smith 2/5	C Cronk 2/2	
24 March	3	Newcastle Knights	AAMI Park, Melbourne	Won	28	20	S Waqa, K Proctor, W Chambers, Y Tonumaipea, C Smith	C Smith 4/6		
29 March	4	Canterbury-Bankstown Bulldogs	nib Stadium, Perth	Lost	12	40	W Chambers, B Slater	T Harris 2/3		
6 April	5	Gold Coast Titans	AAMI Park, Melbourne	Lost	26	28	S Waqa (2), K Bromwich, W Chambers	C Smith 5/5		
14 April	6	St George-Illawarra Dragons	AAMI Park, Melbourne	Won	28	24	W Chambers (2), J Bromwich, C Cronk, Y Tonumaipea	C Smith 4/5		
20 April	7	Canberra Raiders	Canberra Stadium, Canberra	Lost	22	24	M Fonua (2), R Hinchcliffe, S Waqa	C Smith 3/4		
25 April	8	New Zealand Warriors	AAMI Park, Melbourne	Lost	10	16	K Proctor, Y Tonumaipea	C Smith 1/2		
10 May	9	Manly Warringah Sea Eagles	AAMI Park, Melbourne	Won	22	19	B Slater (2), C Cronk, K Mann	C Smith 3/4		
16 May	10	South Sydney Rabbitohs	ANZ Stadium, Sydney	Won	27	14	B Slater (2), C Cronk, S Waqa	C Smith 5/5	C Cronk 1/1	
24 May	11	Bye								
31 May	12	North Queensland Cowboys	1300SMILES Stadium, Townsville	Lost	0	22				
8 June	13	Sydney Roosters	AAMI Park, Melbourne	Lost	12	32	M Fonua, K Mann	C Smith 2/2		
24 June	14	Gold Coast Titans	Skilled Park, Gold Coast	Won	24	20	W Chambers (2), B Hampton, K Mann, B Roberts	B Roberts 2/5		
16 June	15	Parramatta Eels	AAMI Park, Melbourne	Won	46	20	S Waqa (2), B Slater (2), K Mann (2), B Norrie, J McLean	C Smith 6/7, B Roberts 1/1		
30 June	16	St George-Illawarra Dragons	WIN Stadium, Wollongong	Lost	12	24	B Slater, K Mann	C Smith 2/2		
6 July	17	Bye	Bye							
12 July	18	Canterbury-Bankstown Bulldogs	AAMI Park, Melbourne	Lost	4	6	K Proctor	C Smith 0/2		
19 July	19	Canberra Raiders	AAMI Park, Melbourne	Won	28	14	M Fonua (2), M Koroibete, J McLean, K Proctor, S Waqa	C Smith 2/6		
25 July	20	Brisbane Broncos	Suncorp Stadium, Brisbane	Won	30	8	R Hoffman (2), C Cronk, R Hinchcliffe, M Koroibete	C Smith 5/6		
4 August	21	Wests Tigers	Campbelltown Stadium, Sydney	Won	28	6	M Koroibete (2), W Chambers, C Smith, S Waqa	C Smith 4/5		
9 August	22	Newcastle Knights	Hunter Stadium, Newcastle	Lost	30	32	S Waqa (4), B Slater, W Chambers	C Smith 3/6		
16 August	23	Cronulla-Sutherland Sharks	AAMI Park, Melbourne	Won	48	6	M Fonua (2), T Glasby (2), M Koroibete, W Chambers, S Waqa, J Bromwich, J McLean	C Smith 6/9		
25 August	24	Penrith Panthers	Centrebet Stadium, Sydney	Won	24	10	M Koroibete, W Chambers, B Roberts, B Slater	C Smith 4/5		
30 August	25	Sydney Roosters	Allianz Stadium, Sydney	Lost	12	24	B Slater (2)	C Smith 2/2		
5 September	26	Brisbane Broncos	AAMI Park, Melbourne	Won	22	12	M Fonua (2), R Hoffman, C Cronk	C Smith 2/2, W Chambers 1/2		

=== Finals ===
2nd Elimination final

Sunday, 14 September
16:10 AEST (UTC+10)

Melbourne Storm	4 – 28	Canterbury Bankstown Bulldogs
Tries: 1 Waqa 46'; Goals: 0 Chambers (0/1)	1st: 0–24; 2nd: 4–4; Report	Tries: 5 Lafai 17', 37', 75'; Eastwod 6'; Hodkinson 13'; Goals: 4 Hodkinson 7', 15', 19', 38' (4/5)

AAMI Park, Melbourne
Attendance: 19,230
Referees: Matt Cecchin, Gavin Badger
Video referee: Steve Clark & Luke Patten
Player of the Match: James Graham (Canterbury)

=== Ladder ===
2014 NRL season
Pos	Team	Pld	W	D	L	B	PF	PA	PD	Pts
1	Sydney Roosters	24	16	0	8	2	615	385	+230	36
2	Manly Warringah Sea Eagles	24	16	0	8	2	502	399	+103	36
3	South Sydney Rabbitohs (P)	24	15	0	9	2	585	361	+224	34
4	Penrith Panthers	24	15	0	9	2	506	426	+80	34
5	North Queensland Cowboys	24	14	0	10	2	596	406	+190	32
6	Melbourne Storm	24	14	0	10	2	536	460	+76	32
7	Canterbury-Bankstown Bulldogs	24	13	0	11	2	446	439	+7	30
8	Brisbane Broncos	24	12	0	12	2	549	456	+93	28
9	New Zealand Warriors	24	12	0	12	2	571	491	+80	28
10	Parramatta Eels	24	12	0	12	2	477	580	−103	28
11	St. George Illawarra Dragons	24	11	0	13	2	469	528	−59	26
12	Newcastle Knights	24	10	0	14	2	463	571	−108	24
13	Wests Tigers	24	10	0	14	2	420	631	−211	24
14	Gold Coast Titans	24	9	0	15	2	372	538	−166	22
15	Canberra Raiders	24	8	0	16	2	466	623	−157	20
16	Cronulla-Sutherland Sharks	24	5	0	19	2	334	613	−279	14

== 2014 Coaches ==
- Head coach: Craig Bellamy
- Assistant coaches: Justin Morgan & Anthony Seibold
- Coaching consultant: Nathan Brown
- Halves coach: Brett Finch
- NRL Under-20s coach: Matt Adamson
- Head Physiotherapist: Tony Ayoub

== 2014 Squad ==
As of 26 July 2014

Cap (Note: Players are listed with the cap number as they appear on the Melbourne Storm honour board. Additional squad members do not have a cap number.)	Nat.	Player name	Position	First Storm Game	Previous First Grade RL club (Note: This column denotes the previous RL club the player was signed to and played first grade RL for. If they are yet to debut then this is stipulated. If they were merely signed to the club but did not play then it is not counted.)
55	(Australia)	Cameron Smith (c)	HK	2002	(Australia) Melbourne Storm
58	(Australia)	Billy Slater	FB	2003	(Australia) Melbourne Storm
62	(Australia)	Ryan Hoffman	SR, LK	2003	(Australia) Melbourne Storm
73	(Australia)	Cooper Cronk	HB	2004	(Australia) Melbourne Storm
97	(Australia)	Will Chambers	CE, WG	2007	(Australia) Queensland Reds
105	(New Zealand)	Kevin Proctor	SR	2008	(Australia) Melbourne Storm
110	(Australia)	Ryan Hinchcliffe	LK, HK, SR, FE	2009	(Australia) Canberra Raiders
119	(New Zealand)	Jesse Bromwich	PR	2010	(Australia) Melbourne Storm
123	(Australia)	Bryan Norrie	PR	2010	(Australia) Cronulla Sharks
124	(New Zealand)	Matt Duffie	WG, CE, FB	2010	(Australia) Melbourne Storm
127	(Vanuatu)	Justin O'Neill	WG, CE, FB	2010	(Australia) Sydney Roosters
136	(Fiji)	Sisa Waqa	CE, WG, FB	2011	(Australia) Sydney Roosters
143	(Tonga)	Mahe Fonua	CE, WG	2012	(Australia) Melbourne Storm
144	(New Zealand)	Tohu Harris	SR, LK, PR, FE	2013	(Australia) Melbourne Storm
145	(Samoa)	Junior Moors	PR, SR, LK	2013	(Australia) Wests Tigers
147	(New Zealand)	Slade Griffen	HK, LK, CE, SR, FE	2013	(Australia) Melbourne Storm
149	(New Zealand)	Kenny Bromwich	PR, SR, LK	2013	(Australia) Melbourne Storm
150	(Australia)	Jordan McLean	PR	2013	(Australia) Melbourne Storm
151	(Australia)	Mitch Garbutt	PR, LK, SR	2013	(Australia) Newcastle Knights
152	(Australia)	Ben Hampton	FE, HB, FB	2013	(Australia) Melbourne Storm
153	(Australia)	Tim Glasby	PR, SR	2013	(Australia) Melbourne Storm
154	(Samoa)	Young Tonumaipea	WG, FB	2014	(Australia) Melbourne Storm
155	(Australia)	Ben Roberts	FE, HK, HB, CE	2014	(Australia) Parramatta Eels
156	(Australia)	George Rose	PR, SR	2014	(Australia) Manly-Warringah Sea Eagles
157	(Australia)	Dayne Weston	PR, SR	2014	(Australia) Penrith Panthers
158	(Australia)	Kurt Mann	FE, FB, HB, CE, HK	2014	(Australia) Newcastle Knights
159	(Australia)	Joel Romelo	FE, HK, HB, LK	2014	(Australia) Canterbury-Bankstown Bulldogs
160	(Australia)	Cameron Munster	FE, FB, HB, HK	2014	(Australia) Melbourne Storm
161	(Fiji)	Marika Koroibete	WG	2014	(Australia) Wests Tigers
—	(Lebanon)	Travis Robinson	WG, CE, FB	Yet to debut	(Australia) Penrith Panthers
—	(Australia)	Cody Walker	HB, FE	Yet to debut	(Australia) Easts Tigers
—	(New Zealand)	Hymel Hunt	CE, WG, SR, LK, FB	Yet to debut	(Australia) Gold Coast Titans
—	(Tonga)	Felise Kaufusi	PR	Yet to debut	(Australia) North Queensland Cowboys
—	(Cook Islands)	Charnze Nicoll-Klokstad	CE, WG, SR, LK, FB	Yet to debut	(Australia) Melbourne Storm
—	(Australia)	Matthew Lodge	PR, SR	Yet to debut	(Australia) Melbourne Storm
—	(Australia)	Rhys Kennedy	SR, LK	Yet to debut	(Australia) Melbourne Storm

== 2014 Player movements ==
Losses

- Gareth Widdop to St. George Illawarra Dragons
- Maurice Blair to Gold Coast Titans
- Jason Ryles to Retirement
- Brett Finch to Retirement
- Junior Sa'u to Salford Red Devils
- Lagi Setu to Canberra Raiders
- Kirisome Auva'a to South Sydney Rabbitohs
- Matt McGahan to Rugby Union
- Denny Solomona to London Broncos
- Siosaia Vave to Cronulla Sharks

Gains

- George Rose from Manly Sea Eagles
- Travis Robinson from Penrith Panthers
- Cody Walker from Easts Tigers
- Hymel Hunt from Gold Coast Titans
- Felise Kaufusi from North Queensland Cowboys
- Cameron Munster from Central Queensland Capras
- Dayne Weston from Penrith Panthers
- Ben Roberts from Parramatta Eels
- Joel Romelo from Canterbury-Bankstown Bulldogs
- Marika Koroibete from Wests Tigers

== Representative honours ==
The following players have played a representative match in 2014.

- (C) = Captain

Player	City Vs Country	ANZAC Test	Pacific Test	State Of Origin 1	State Of Origin 2	State of Origin 3	Four Nations
Jesse Bromwich	—N/a	New Zealand	—N/a	—N/a	—N/a	—N/a	New Zealand
Will Chambers	—N/a	—N/a	—N/a	—N/a	—N/a	Queensland	Australia
Cooper Cronk	—N/a	Australia	—N/a	Queensland	—N/a	Queensland	Australia
Tohu Harris	—N/a	New Zealand	—N/a	—N/a	—N/a	—N/a	New Zealand
Ryan Hoffman	City (C)	—N/a	—N/a	New South Wales	New South Wales	New South Wales	Australia
Kevin Proctor	—N/a	New Zealand	—N/a	—N/a	—N/a	—N/a	New Zealand
Ben Roberts	—N/a	—N/a	—N/a	—N/a	—N/a	—N/a	Samoa
Billy Slater	—N/a	Australia	—N/a	Queensland	Queensland	Queensland	—N/a
Cameron Smith	—N/a	Australia (C)	—N/a	Queensland (C)	Queensland (C)	Queensland (C)	Australia (C)
Young Tonumaipea	—N/a	—N/a	Samoa	—N/a	—N/a	—N/a	—N/a

== Statistics ==
This table contains playing statistics for all Melbourne Storm players to have played in the 2014 NRL season.

- Statistics sources:

Name	Appearances	Tries	Goals	Field goals	Points
Jesse Bromwich	24	2	0	0	8
Kenny Bromwich	18	2	0	0	8
Will Chambers	22	11	1 (Note: Goalkicking percentage 33.33% (1/3))	0	46
Cooper Cronk	19	5	0	3	23
Mahe Fonua	20	10	0	0	40
Mitch Garbutt	6	0	0	0	0
Tim Glasby	13	2	0	0	8
Ben Hampton	11	2	0	0	8
Tohu Harris	25	0	2 (Note: Goalkicking percentage 66.67% (2/3))	0	4
Ryan Hinchcliffe	25	2	0	0	8
Ryan Hoffman	24	3	0	0	12
Marika Koroibete	10	6	0	0	24
Kurt Mann	8	6	0	0	24
Jordan McLean	16	3	0	0	12
Junior Moors	10	0	0	0	0
Cameron Munster	1	0	0	0	0
Bryan Norrie	25	1	0	0	4
Justin O'Neill	4	0	0	0	0
Kevin Proctor	25	5	0	0	20
Ben Roberts	18	2	3 (Note: Goalkicking percentage 42.86% (3/7))	0	14
Joel Romelo	2	0	0	0	0
George Rose	9	0	0	0	0
Billy Slater	22	12	0	0	48
Cameron Smith	23	2	68 (Note: Goalkicking percentage 70.83% (68/96))	1	145
Young Tonumaipea	14	3	0	0	12
Sisa Waqa	24	18	0	0	72
Dayne Weston	6	0	0	0	0
27 Players used	-	97	74	4	540

=== Scorers ===
Most Points in a game: 16

- Round 22 – Sisa Waqa (4 tries) vs Newcastle Knights

Most tries in a game: 4

- Round 22 – Sisa Waqa vs Newcastle Knights

=== Winning games ===
Highest score in a winning game: 48 points

- Round 23 vs Cronulla-Sutherland Sharks

Lowest score in a winning game: 18 points

- Round 2 vs Penrith Panthers

Greatest winning margin: 42 points

- Round 23 vs Cronulla-Sutherland Sharks

Greatest number of games won consecutively: 3

- Round 1 – Round 3
- Round 19 – Round 21

=== Losing games ===
Highest score in a losing game: 30 points

- Round 22 vs Newcastle Knights

Lowest score in a losing game: 0 points

- Round 12 vs North Queensland Cowboys

Greatest losing margin: 28 points

- Round 4 vs Canterbury-Bankstown Bulldogs

Greatest number of games lost consecutively: 2

- Round 4 – Round 5
- Round 7 – Round 8
- Round 12 – Round 13
- Round 16 – Round 18

== Awards ==
=== Melbourne Storm Awards Night ===
Held at Peninsula Docklands on Friday 10 October.

- Melbourne Storm Player of the Year: Jesse Bromwich
- Melbourne Storm Rookie of the Year: Kurt Mann
- Suzuki Members' Player of Year: Cooper Cronk
- Melbourne Storm Most Improved: Jordan McLean
- Melbourne Storm Best Forward: Cameron Smith
- Melbourne Storm Best Back: Cooper Cronk
- Best Try: Young Tonumaipea, Round 6 vs Dragons
- Darren Bell U20s Player of Year: Nelson Asofa-Solomona
- U20s Best Forward: Joe Stimson
- U20s Best Back: Charnze Nicoll-Klokstad
- Greg Brentnall Young Achievers Award: Charnze Nicoll-Klokstad
- Mick Moore Club Person of the Year: Craig Sultana (Head Trainer)

=== Rugby League Players Association Awards Night ===
- RLPA NYC Education Player of the Year: Christian Welch
- RLPA Education & Welfare Club of the Year: Peter Robinson, Brian Phelan & Andrew Blowers.

=== Additional Awards ===
- I Don't Quit Iron Bar: Matt Duffie
- Harry Sunderland Medal: Cameron Smith
