= 2013 Melbourne Storm season =

- NRL Rank: 3rd
- Play-off result: Semi-final Loss
- 2013 record: Wins: 16; draws: 1; losses: 7
- Points scored: For: 589; against: 373

Team information
- CEO: Ron Gauci (until May 2013); Mark Evans (from May 2013)
- Coach: Craig Bellamy
- Captain: Cameron Smith (23 games) Ryan Hinchcliffe (2 games) Cooper Cronk (1 game)
- Stadium: AAMI Park – 30,050
- Avg. attendance: 16,302
- High attendance: 25,480 (Round 7) (Note: Regular season home games only)

Top scorers
- Tries: Billy Slater (18)
- Goals: Cameron Smith (84)
- Points: Cameron Smith (176)
← 2012	List of seasons	2014 →

The 2013 Melbourne Storm season was the 16th in the club's history. They competed in the 2013 NRL season. They were coached by Craig Bellamy and captained by Cameron Smith. They had previously won the 2012 NRL Grand Final therefore started the season as reigning premiers.

Seven straight wins to start the season extended the club's winning streak to 15 games dating back to the previous campaign. The Origin period proved difficult to negotiate however with team unable to come up with some crucial wins at the business end of the season, eventually finishing in third place. Two finals losses to the Rabbitohs and Knights prematurely ended the season, as Storm did not make the preliminary final stage for just the second time in eight years. The Storm attack was the shining light of the season, producing 98 tries to be ranked second in the competition. The team also had the best home record of any side in the NRL, losing just the one game at AAMI Park during the season. Cooper Cronk was rewarded for several seasons of brilliance, claiming his first Dally M Medal Player of the Year honour. Off the field Storm experienced a change at the helm with Mark Evans replacing Ron Gauci as CEO midway through the season, following divestment of the club by News Limited to new ownership.

== Season summary ==
- 11 February – On the day the club leaves Australia to head to England for the World Club Challenge, it's announced that coach Craig Bellamy has extended his contract that will see him remain as coach until the end of the 2016 season.
- World Club Challenge – Melbourne start the season with a tight 18–14 win in the 2013 World Club Challenge against Leeds Rhinos to be crowned World Champions. Cooper Cronk wins the man of the match award, steering Melbourne around the field in attack.
- Round 1 – Melbourne continue their round 1 winning streak, defeating the St George Illawarra Dragons 30–10 in hot conditions at AAMI Park. Temperatures hit 34 °C during the afternoon match, with Melbourne's request for a drinks break knocked back by the visitors and the NRL. The victory was Melbourne's 10th straight round 1 victory under Craig Bellamy.
- Round 2 – The club's win over the North Queensland Cowboys marked their 10th consecutive win, with the streak beginning in round 22 of the 2012 season and extending through the 2012 finals series.
- Round 3 – Second-row forward Ryan Hoffman becomes the fifth player to appear in 200 NRL matches with the club, notching the milestone up in the rematch of the 2012 NRL Grand Final against Canterbury-Bankstown Bulldogs, with the Storm victorious 22–18. Billy Slater escaped sanction from the NRL Judiciary following the match after his boot collected Bulldogs forward David Klemmer while competing for a high ball.
- Round 4 – In Melbourne Storm's 400th NRL match, the club wins their 12th consecutive game, equalling their all-time record achieved during the 2011 season. The Storm had led the Brisbane Broncos 20–6 at half time, only for the Broncos to fight back in the second half to take the lead. A hat trick of tries to Billy Slater and a late try to Matthew Duffie sealing the win.
- Round 5 – Melbourne win their 13th consecutive game, breaking their all-time club record.
- Round 6 – Storm defeated the South Sydney Rabbitohs to remain the only undefeated side in the NRL in 2013.
- 19 April – Gareth Widdop announces he will leave the Storm for the St George Illawarra Dragons at the end of the season.
- Round 7 – Melbourne's winning streak continued to 15 games with a 28–18 win over the New Zealand Warriors on ANZAC Day, in the club's highest attended match at AAMI Park for the season.
- 1 May – The Storm re-sign Will Chambers to a contract that will see him remain with the club until 2017.
- Round 8 – Melbourne suffers their first loss of the season ending the club record winning streak at 15 games. The Storm are one of only seven teams in the history of the NSWRL/ARL/NRL to have achieved this. The upset defeat by the Canberra Raiders was their third successive win at AAMI Park.
- 21 May – A syndicate led by Bart Campbell take over the club as News Corp Australia divest their ownership of the companies holding the NRL franchise. As part of the take over, CEO Ron Gauci is replaced by Englishman Mark Evans.
- Round 9 – Penrith Panthers defeat Melbourne for the first time in eight years, winning 12–10.
- Round 10 – After being behind 8–0 at half time, Melbourne come back to force extra time against the Manly Warringah Sea Eagles at AAMI Park, thanks to a last minute penalty goal scored by Cameron Smith, to level the scoreboard at 10–all. No golden point score came in the extra period, with the 10–all draw the first draw of the 2013 NRL season, and Melbourne's first draw since 2009.
- Round 11 – Melbourne return to the winner's list with a 26–18 win over the Sydney Roosters. Jordan McLean made his NRL debut as the 150th player for the Storm, while Cameron Smith scored his 1400th point.
- Round 13 – Following a bye, Melbourne wearing Superman logo jerseys thrash Cronulla-Sutherland Sharks 38–6 to mark Cameron Smith's 250th NRL match and Justin O'Neill 50th match with a win.
- Round 15 – Playing without Origin players Smith, Slater, Cronk and Hoffman; Melbourne suffer an 18–12 loss to the Gold Coast Titans. Ben Hampton scored two tries on debut and Gareth Widdop suffered a dislocated hip, with the injury set to keep him out of the team for up to three months.
- Round 16 – In extremely wet conditions at the Leichhardt Oval, the Wests Tigers made the most of the conditions to inflict a 22–4 defeat upon Melbourne.
- Round 17 – Melbourne hold the Broncos scoreless at AAMI Park, with Maurice Blair scoring two tries in a 32–0 win.
- 11 July – Forward Jason Ryles announces his retirement from the NRL will be at the end of the 2013 season.
- Round 18 – Missing players selected for Origin, Melbourne are held scoreless for the first time since the 2008 NRL Grand Final, losing to the Bulldogs 39–0 at ANZ Stadium. Referee for the match Allan Shortall coming under criticism for not using the sin bin against Josh Reynolds, or awarding a penalty try to Justin O'Neill in an incident just after half time.
- Round 21 – The Storm returned to form with a massive 68–4 win over the Canberra Raiders. The win equalled their all-time greatest winning margin record set in 2001 against the Wests Tigers. As of 2024, it remains Melbourne's highest score in matches played outside Victoria. During the match, Billy Slater also scored his 150th try.
- Round 22 – Brett Finch plays his 50th match for the club in a 26–8 win over the South Sydney Rabbitohs.
- 22 August – Brett Finch announces the 2013 season will be his last in the NRL, retiring 16 seasons after making his debut with Canberra.
- Round 23 – In Bryan Norrie's 150th NRL match, Melbourne come from behind at half time to defeat the Newcastle Knights 23–10.
- Round 24 – Melbourne score 60 points for the second time in a month, inflicting a 64–4 win over the Parramatta Eels. Billy Slater scoring a hat trick, while Kevin Proctor made his 100th NRL appearance.
- Round 26 – The Storm win their final game of the regular season in Golden point extra time 23–22 against the Gold Coast Titans, with Cooper Cronk kicking the decisive field goal in the 88th minute from 41 metres out. Cameron Smith also scored his 1500th career points in the match. The result saw Melbourne finish third on the NRL ladder, after spending the entire season in the top four on the ladder.
- Qualifying final – South Sydney earn their first win over Melbourne since 2010, winning 20–10. The match at ANZ Stadium saw Souths jump out to a 14–0 lead at half time, before a Slater try got Melbourne on the board early in the second half. Another effort by Slater was denied by the video referee, before Souths scored again with little over ten minutes to play.
- Semi final – Newcastle upset Melbourne at AAMI Park 18–16 to end the Storm's season with straight sets defeats in the finals. It was the Knights first win at the venue and their first against Melbourne since 2009.

=== Milestone games ===
Round	Player	Milestone
Round 1	Slade Griffen	NRL debut
Round 1	Tohu Harris	NRL debut
Round 1	Junior Moors	Storm debut
Round 1	Lagi Setu	Storm debut
Round 3	Ryan Hoffman	200th game
Round 3	Junior Sa'u	Storm debut
Round 5	Kenny Bromwich	NRL debut
Round 11	Jordan McLean	NRL debut
Round 13	Justin O'Neill	50th game
Round 13	Cameron Smith	250th game
Round 14	Mitch Garbutt	NRL debut
Round 15	Ben Hampton	NRL debut
Round 16	Tim Glasby	NRL debut
Round 21	Billy Slater	150th try
Round 22	Brett Finch	50th game
Round 23	Bryan Norrie	150th game
Round 24	Kevin Proctor	100th game

=== Jerseys ===
In 2013 the Storm jerseys were again made by Kooga. They created a new jersey design for 2013 which featured more navy blue and a more prominent and deeper chevron that integrated the sponsor's (Crown Casino) logo into the design, which featured purple lightning bolts for the first time. The secondary club colours of gold and white were removed and reduced respectively, so that the jersey was essentially half navy blue and half purple. The clash jersey was a white version of the home jersey.

Special

- World Club Challenge – Melbourne would wear a predominately white and purple jersey for the match against Leeds Rhinos, featuring a deep chevron containing a purple gradient design, with silver and gold highlights.
- Round 10 – Melbourne released a special jersey for the "Women of League" round match against Manly Warringah Sea Eagles. The jersey consisted of navy blue and pink horizontal hoops.
- Round 13 – Storm wore a jersey to promote the Superman movie Man of Steel. The jerseys design is similar to that of the costume worn in the movie with the red Superman logo on the front.
- Round 14 – Storm wore a heritage jersey design, which was a replica of the original 1998 navy blue jersey.
- Round 17 – Dubbed the "Big Battle," for the home match against the Brisbane Broncos the Storm wore a mostly silver jersey design.

=== Attendance averages ===
	Total	Matches	Average
Home	195,623	12	16,302
Away	228,628	12	19,057
All regular season games	424,311	24	17,680
Finals	41,258	2	20,629
All Games	465,569	26	17,907

== Fixtures ==
=== Pre Season ===
Date	Rd	Opponent	Venue	Result	Mel.	Opp.	Tries	Goals	Field goals	Ref
2 February	Trial	Eastern Suburbs Tigers	Gosch's Paddock, Melbourne	Won	28	4	K Auva'a (2), T Harris, M Duffie, M Blair, J Sa'u, M Fonua			
8 February	Trial	Canberra Raiders	Simonds Stadium, Geelong	Lost	8	40	M Duffie, R Kennar			

2013 World Club Challenge

22 February 2013
20:00 GMT (UTC+0)

Leeds Rhinos	14 – 18	Melbourne Storm
Tries: 2 Hall 29'; Jones-Buchanan 53' Goals: 3 Sinfield 30', pen 40', 54' (3/3)	1st: 8–8; 2nd: 6–10; Report	Tries: 3 Slater 20'; J Bromwich 43'; Harris 47'; Goals: 3 Smith pen 12', 20', 44' (3/4)

Headingley Carnegie Stadium, Leeds
Attendance: 20,400
Referee: Ben Thaler (England)
Player of the Match: Cooper Cronk (Melbourne)

=== Regular season ===
==== Result by round ====
Round	1	2	3	4	5	6	7	8	9	10	11	12	13	14	15	16	17	18	19	20	21	22	23	24	25	26
Ground	H	A	H	A	H	A	H	H	A	H	A	–	H	H	A	A	H	A	–	A	A	H	A	H	A	H
Result	W	W	W	W	W	W	W	L	L	D	W	B	W	W	L	L	W	L	B	L	W	W	W	W	L	W
Position	4	1	1	1	1	1	1	1	3	3	2	2	2	2	2	3	3	3	3	4	4	4	3	3	4	3
Points	2	4	6	8	10	12	14	14	14	15	17	19	21	23	23	23	25	25	27	27	29	31	33	35	35	37

Source: Rugby League Tables
A = Away; H = Home; N = Neutral; B = Bye; W = Win; D = Draw; L = Loss

==== Matches ====
- (g.p.) – Golden Point extra time
- (pen) – Penalty try

Date	Rd	Opponent	Venue	Result	Mel.	Opp.	Tries	Goals	Field goals	Ref
10 March	1	St George-Illawarra Dragons	AAMI Park, Melbourne	Won	30	10	J O'Neill (2), B Slater, G Widdop, M Fonua	C Smith 5/5		
16 March	2	North Queensland Cowboys	1300SMILES Stadium, Townsville	Won	32	10	W Chambers (2), C Cronk (2), R Hinchcliffe, R Hoffman	C Smith 3/5, G Widdop 1/1		
21 March	3	Canterbury-Bankstown Bulldogs	AAMI Park, Melbourne	Won	22	18	R Hinchcliffe, M Duffie, M Fonua, L Setu	C Smith 3/4		
29 March	4	Brisbane Broncos	Suncorp Stadium, Brisbane	Won	32	26	B Slater (3), M Duffie (2), J Sa'u	C Smith 4/6		
8 April	5	Wests Tigers	AAMI Park, Melbourne	Won	26	12	S Vave, M Fonua, C Cronk, S Waqa	C Smith 4/4, G Widdop 1/1		
13 April	6	South Sydney Rabbitohs	ANZ Stadium, Sydney	Won	17	10	K Proctor, M Fonua, G Widdop	C Smith 2/3	C Cronk 1/1	
25 April	7	New Zealand Warriors	AAMI Park, Melbourne	Won	28	18	W Chambers (2), M Fonua, B Slater, S Waqa	C Smith 4/5		
4 May	8	Canberra Raiders	AAMI Park, Melbourne	Lost	20	24	J Bromwich, B Slater, M Fonua, J O'Neill	C Smith 2/4		
12 May	9	Penrith Panthers	Centrebet Stadium, Penrith	Lost	10	12	J Bromwich, S Waqa	C Smith 1/2		
20 May	10	Manly-Warringah Sea Eagles	AAMI Park, Melbourne	Draw	10	10	M Blair	C Smith 3/3		
25 May	11	Sydney Roosters	Allianz Stadium, Sydney	Won	26	18	M Blair, W Chambers, J O'Neill, C Smith	C Smith 5/6		
1 June	12	Bye								
9 June	13	Cronulla Sharks	AAMI Park, Melbourne	Won	38	6	M Blair, T Harris, R Hoffman, J O'Neill, K Proctor, B Slater, G Widdop	C Smith 5/7		
16 June	14	Newcastle Knights	AAMI Park, Melbourne	Won	16	14	M Blair, B Slater, S Waqa	C Smith 2/3		
24 June	15	Gold Coast Titans	Skilled Park, Gold Coast	Lost	12	18	B Hampton (2)	M Blair 1/1, G Widdop 1/1		
29 June	16	Wests Tigers	Leichhardt Oval, Balmain	Lost	4	22	M Blair	C Smith 0/1		
5 July	17	Brisbane Broncos	AAMI Park, Melbourne	Won	32	0	M Blair (2), J Bromwich, R Hinchcliffe, J O'Neill, S Waqa	C Smith 4/6		
14 July	18	Canterbury-Bankstown Bulldogs	ANZ Stadium, Sydney	Lost	0	39				
20 July	19	Bye	Bye							
28 July	20	New Zealand Warriors	Mt. Smart Stadium, Auckland	Lost	22	30	J O'Neill, B Slater, M Blair, C Cronk	C Smith 3/4		
4 August	21	Canberra Raiders	Canberra Stadium, Canberra	Won	68	4	M Fonua (3), S Waqa (3), W Chambers (2), B Slater (2), T Harris, K Proctor	C Smith 10/12	C Smith 0/1	
9 August	22	South Sydney Rabbitohs	AAMI Park, Melbourne	Won	26	8	W Chambers, K Bromwich, S Waqa, J O'Neill	C Smith 5/7		
18 August	23	Newcastle Knights	Hunter Stadium, Newcastle	Won	23	10	J McLean, C Smith, B Slater, B Norrie	C Smith 3/4	C Cronk 1/1	
25 August	24	Parramatta Eels	AAMI Park, Melbourne	Won	64	4	B Slater (3), W Chambers (2), R Hoffman (2), M Blair, J Bromwich, K Bromwich, T Glasby	C Smith 10/11		
31 August	25	Manly-Warringah Sea Eagles	Brookvale Oval, Manly	Lost	8	28	J O'Neill, S Waqa	C Smith 0/2		
7 September	26	Gold Coast Titans	AAMI Park, Melbourne	Won (g.p.)	23	22	B Slater (2), W Chambers, S Waqa	C Smith 3/4	C Cronk 1/5	

=== Finals ===
First Qualifying Final

Friday, 13 September
19:45 AEST (UTC+10)

South Sydney Rabbitohs	20 – 10	Melbourne Storm
Tries: 3 Farrell 8'; Lima 26'; Luke 67'; Goals: 4 Reynolds 10', pen 22', 27', 69' (4/4)	1st: 14–0; 2nd: 6–10; Report	Tries: 2 Slater 54'; Chambers 72'; Goals: 1 Smith 55' (1/2)

ANZ Stadium, Sydney
Attendance: 21,609
Referee: Shayne Hayne & Jared Maxwell

Second Semi Final

Saturday, 21 September
19:45 AEST (UTC+10)

Melbourne Storm	16 – 18	Newcastle Knights
Tries: 3 Blair 27'; Waqa 48'; J Bromwich 66'; Goals: 2 Smith 50', 66' (2/3)	1st: 4–12; 2nd: 12–6; Report	Tries: 3 Uate 22'; Houston 38'; Hilder 42'; Goals: 3 Roberts 23', 40', 43' (3/3)

AAMI Park, Melbourne
Attendance: 19,649
Referee: Gerard Sutton and Ben Cummins

== Ladder ==
2013 NRL season
Pos	Team	Pld	W	D	L	B	PF	PA	PD	Pts
1	Sydney Roosters (P)	24	18	0	6	2	640	325	+315	40
2	South Sydney Rabbitohs	24	18	0	6	2	588	384	+204	40
3	Melbourne Storm	24	16	1	7	2	589	373	+216	37
4	Manly Warringah Sea Eagles	24	15	1	8	2	588	366	+222	35
5	Cronulla-Sutherland Sharks	24	14	0	10	2	468	460	+8	32
6	Canterbury-Bankstown Bulldogs	24	13	0	11	2	529	463	+66	30
7	Newcastle Knights	24	12	1	11	2	528	422	+106	29
8	North Queensland Cowboys	24	12	0	12	2	507	431	+76	28
9	Gold Coast Titans	24	11	0	13	2	500	518	−18	26
10	Penrith Panthers	24	11	0	13	2	495	532	−37	26
11	New Zealand Warriors	24	11	0	13	2	495	554	−59	26
12	Brisbane Broncos	24	10	1	13	2	434	477	−43	25
13	Canberra Raiders	24	10	0	14	2	434	624	−190	24
14	St. George Illawarra Dragons	24	7	0	17	2	379	530	−151	18
15	Wests Tigers	24	7	0	17	2	386	687	−301	18
16	Parramatta Eels	24	5	0	19	2	326	740	−414	14

== 2013 Coaching staff ==
- Head coach: Craig Bellamy
- Assistant coaches: Kevin Walters & David Kidwell
- NRL Under 20s coach: Anthony Seibold
- Strength and Conditioning coach: Alex Corvo
- Head Physiotherapist: Tony Ayoub

== 2013 Squad ==
As of 16 July 2013.

Cap (Note: Players are listed with the cap number as they appear on the Melbourne Storm honour board. Additional squad members do not have a cap number.)	Nat.	Player name	Position	First Storm Game	Previous First Grade RL club (Note: This column denotes the previous RL club the player was signed to and played first grade RL for. If they are yet to debut then this is stipulated. If they were merely signed to the club but did not play then it is not counted.)
55	(Australia)	Cameron Smith (c)	HK	2002	(Australia) Melbourne Storm
58	(Australia)	Billy Slater	FB	2003	(Australia) Melbourne Storm
62	(Australia)	Ryan Hoffman	SR, LK	2003	(Australia) Melbourne Storm
73	(Australia)	Cooper Cronk	HB	2004	(Australia) Melbourne Storm
97	(Australia)	Will Chambers	CE	2007	(Australia) Queensland Reds
105	(New Zealand)	Kevin Proctor	SR	2008	(Australia) Melbourne Storm
110	(Australia)	Ryan Hinchcliffe	SR	2009	(Australia) Canberra Raiders
115	(Australia)	Brett Finch	FE, HB	2009	(England) Wigan Warriors
119	(New Zealand)	Jesse Bromwich	PR	2010	(Australia) Melbourne Storm
123	(Australia)	Bryan Norrie	PR	2010	(Australia) Cronulla-Sutherland Sharks
124	(New Zealand)	Matt Duffie	WG, CE	2010	(Australia) Melbourne Storm
125	(England)	Gareth Widdop	HB	2010	(Australia) Melbourne Storm
127	(Vanuatu)	Justin O'Neill	WG	2010	(Australia) Sydney Roosters
134	(Australia)	Maurice Blair	WG, CE	2011	(Australia) Penrith Panthers
136	(Fiji)	Sisa Waqa	CE, WG	2011	(Australia) Sydney Roosters
139	(Australia)	Siosaia Vave	PR	2012	(Australia) Cronulla-Sutherland Sharks
140	(Australia)	Jason Ryles	PR	2012	(Australia) Sydney Roosters
143	(Tonga)	Mahe Fonua	CE	2012	(Australia) Melbourne Storm
144	(New Zealand)	Tohu Harris	SR	2013	(Australia) Melbourne Storm
145	(Samoa)	Junior Moors	PR, SR	2013	(Australia) Wests Tigers
146	(Samoa)	Lagi Setu	SR	2013	(Australia) Brisbane Broncos (Note: Setu played for the Brisbane Broncos in 2010, before leaving rugby league for missionary service.)
147	(New Zealand)	Slade Griffen	HK	2013	(Australia) Melbourne Storm
148	(Samoa)	Junior Sa'u	FB, WG	2013	(Australia) Newcastle Knights
149	(New Zealand)	Kenny Bromwich	PR, LK	2013	(Australia) Melbourne Storm
150	(Australia)	Jordan McLean	PR	2013	(Australia) Melbourne Storm
151	(Australia)	Mitch Garbutt	PR, SR	2013	(Australia) Melbourne Storm
152	(Australia)	Ben Hampton	HB	2013	(Australia) Melbourne Storm
153	(Australia)	Tim Glasby	PR	2013	(Australia) Melbourne Storm
–	(Samoa)	Kirisome Auva'a	WG	Yet to Debut	(Australia) Melbourne Storm
–	(Australia)	Kurt Mann	FE	Yet to Debut	(Australia) Newcastle Knights
–	(Australia)	Matthew Lodge	PR	Yet to Debut	(Australia) Melbourne Storm
–	(Australia)	Matt McGahan	HB, FE	Yet to Debut	(Australia) Melbourne Storm
–	(New Zealand)	Denny Solomona	FB	Yet to Debut	(Australia) Melbourne Storm
–	(Samoa)	Young Tonumaipea	WG, FB	Yet to Debut	(Australia) Melbourne Storm

== Player movement ==
Losses

- Richie Fa'aoso to Manly Warringah Sea Eagles
- Michael Greenfield to Retirement
- Luke Kelly to Parramatta Eels
- Rory Kostjasyn to North Queensland Cowboys
- Jaiman Lowe to Retirement
- Todd Lowrie to New Zealand Warriors
- Sika Manu to Penrith Panthers
- Shea Moylan to Wynnum Manly Seagulls
- Dane Nielsen to New Zealand Warriors

Gains

- Brett Finch from Wigan Warriors
- Kurt Mann from Newcastle Knights
- Junior Moors from Wests Tigers
- Junior Sa'u from Newcastle Knights
- Lagi Setu from Unattached

== Representative honours ==
The following players have played a representative match in 2013.

- (C) = Captain

Player	All Stars Match	City Vs Country	Anzac Test	Pacific Test	State of Origin 1	State of Origin 2	State of Origin 3	World Cup
Jesse Bromwich	—N/a	—N/a	New Zealand	—N/a	—N/a	—N/a	—N/a	New Zealand
Cooper Cronk	—N/a	—N/a	Australia	—N/a	Queensland	Queensland	Queensland	Australia
Mahe Fonua	—N/a	—N/a	—N/a	Tonga	—N/a	—N/a	—N/a	Tonga
Tohu Harris	—N/a	—N/a	New Zealand	—N/a	—N/a	—N/a	—N/a	—N/a
Ryan Hoffman	—N/a	City (C)	—N/a	—N/a	New South Wales	New South Wales	New South Wales	—N/a
Junior Moors	—N/a	—N/a	—N/a	—N/a	—N/a	—N/a	—N/a	Samoa
Justin O'Neill	NRL All Stars	—N/a	—N/a	—N/a	—N/a	—N/a	—N/a	—N/a
Kevin Proctor	—N/a	—N/a	New Zealand	—N/a	—N/a	—N/a	—N/a	—N/a
Junior Sau	—N/a	—N/a	—N/a	Samoa	—N/a	—N/a	—N/a	Samoa
Billy Slater	—N/a	—N/a	Australia	—N/a	Queensland	Queensland	Queensland	Australia
Cameron Smith	NRL All Stars	—N/a	Australia (C)	—N/a	Queensland (C)	Queensland (C)	Queensland (C)	Australia (C)
Siosaia Vave	—N/a	—N/a	—N/a	—N/a	—N/a	—N/a	—N/a	Tonga
Sisa Waqa	—N/a	—N/a	—N/a	—N/a	—N/a	—N/a	—N/a	Fiji
Gareth Widdop	—N/a	—N/a	—N/a	—N/a	—N/a	—N/a	—N/a	England

== Statistics ==
This table contains playing statistics for all Melbourne Storm players to have played in the 2013 NRL season.

- Statistics sources:

Name	Appearances	Tries	Goals	Field goals	Points
Maurice Blair	18	10	1 (Note: Goalkicking percentage 100% (1/1))	0	42
Jesse Bromwich	26	6	0	0	24
Kenny Bromwich	9	1	0	0	4
Will Chambers	25	12	0	0	48
Cooper Cronk	23	4	0 (Note: Goalkicking percentage 0% (0/1))	3	19
Matt Duffie	4	3	0	0	12
Brett Finch	13	0	0	0	0
Mahe Fonua	13	9	0	0	36
Mitch Garbutt	3	0	0	0	0
Tim Glasby	2	1	0	0	4
Slade Griffen	10	0	0	0	0
Ben Hampton	2	2	0	0	8
Tohu Harris	25	2	0	0	8
Ryan Hinchcliffe	23	3	0	0	12
Ryan Hoffman	24	4	0	0	16
Jordan McLean	14	1	0	0	4
Junior Moors	10	0	0	0	0
Bryan Norrie	25	1	0	0	4
Justin O'Neill	21	9	0	0	36
Kevin Proctor	23	3	0	0	12
Jason Ryles	24	0	0	0	0
Junior Sau	4	1	0	0	4
Lagi Setu	7	1	0	0	4
Billy Slater	24	18	0	0	72
Cameron Smith	23	2	84 (Note: Goalkicking percentage 73.34% (84/113))	0	176
Siosaia Vave	9	1	0	0	4
Sisa Waqa	22	12	0	0	48
Gareth Widdop	16	3	3 (Note: Goalkicking percentage 100% (3/3))	0	18
28 Players used	–	109	88	3	615

=== Scorers ===
Most points in a game: 20

- Round 21 – Cameron Smith (10 goals) vs Canberra Raiders
- Round 24 – Cameron Smith (10 goals) vs Parramatta Eels

Most tries in a game: 3

- Round 4 – Billy Slater vs Brisbane Broncos
- Round 21 – Mahe Fonua vs Canberra Raiders
- Round 21 – Sisa Waqa vs Canberra Raiders
- Round 24 – Billy Slater vs Parramatta Eels

=== Winning games ===
Highest score in a winning game: 68 points

- Round 21 vs Canberra Raiders

Lowest score in a winning game: 16 points

- Round 14 vs Newcastle Knights

Greatest winning margin: 64 points

- Round 21 vs Canberra Raiders

Greatest number of games won consecutively: 7

- Rounds 1–7

=== Losing games ===
Highest score in a losing game: 22 points

- Round 20 vs New Zealand Warriors

Lowest score in a losing game: 0 points

- Round 18 vs Canterbury-Bankstown Bulldogs

Greatest losing margin: 39 points

- Round 18 vs Canterbury-Bankstown Bulldogs

Greatest number of games lost consecutively: 2

- Rounds 8–9
- Rounds 15–16
- Rounds 18–20
- Finals weeks 1–2

== NRL Under-20s ==
In the sixth season of the NRL's NRL Under 20s now known as the Holden Cup, Anthony Seibold replaced Dean Pay as coach, with Pay moving to the Canberra Raiders as an assistant coach to Ricky Stuart.

Melbourne again finished the regular season in 9th place on the ladder, meaning the club would not qualify for the finals for the second year in a row. A six match losing streak in the second half of the season proving costly.

Kurt Mann (Queensland), Dean Britt and Matthew Lodge (NSW) would make the Under-20 State of Origin teams for the match played in April, with Lodge later featuring in the competition's team of the year chosen at prop forward.

=== Ladder ===
2013 National Youth Competition season
Pos	Team	Pld	W	D	L	B	PF	PA	PD	Pts
1	Canberra Raiders	24	19	1	4	2	765	614	+151	43
2	Penrith Panthers (P)	24	17	0	7	2	689	460	+229	38
3	Sydney Roosters	24	17	0	7	2	711	554	+157	38
4	Canterbury-Bankstown Bulldogs	24	16	1	7	2	846	626	+220	37
5	Wests Tigers	24	14	0	10	2	687	564	+123	32
6	New Zealand Warriors	24	13	2	9	2	679	599	+80	32
7	South Sydney Rabbitohs	24	12	1	11	2	607	608	-1	29
8	Brisbane Broncos	24	12	0	12	2	660	740	-80	28
9	Melbourne Storm	24	11	0	13	2	558	564	-6	26
10	North Queensland Cowboys	24	9	2	13	2	582	615	-33	24
11	St. George-Illawarra Dragons	24	9	1	14	2	596	663	-67	23
12	Newcastle Knights	24	9	0	15	2	584	602	-18	22
13	Cronulla-Sutherland Sharks	24	8	1	15	2	516	667	-151	21
14	Parramatta Eels	24	7	2	15	2	570	726	-156	20
15	Gold Coast Titans	24	7	0	17	2	520	786	-266	18
16	Manly-Warringah Sea Eagles	24	6	1	17	2	560	742	-182	17

=== Statistics ===
==== Scorers ====
Most points in a game: 20 points

- Round 14 – Matt McGahan (2 tries, 6 goals) vs Newcastle Knights

Most tries in a game: 4

- Round 13 – Denny Solomona vs Cronulla Sharks

Most points (season): 148

- Matt McGahan (8 tries, 58 goals)

Most tries (season): 20

- Dane Chang

==== Winning games ====
Highest score in a winning game: 36 points

- Round 1 vs St George Illawarra Dragons
- Round 14 vs Newcastle Knights

Lowest score in a winning game: 24 points

- Round 5 vs Wests Tigers
- Round 15 vs Gold Coast Titans

Greatest winning margin: 28 points

- Round 14 vs Newcastle Knights

Greatest number of games won consecutively: 4

- Round 3 – Round 6

==== Losing games ====
Highest score in a losing game: 28 points

- Round 22 vs South Sydney Rabbitohs

Lowest score in a losing game: 6 points

- Round 9 vs Penrith Panthers

Greatest losing margin: 34 points

- Round 8 vs Canberra Raiders

Greatest number of games lost consecutively: 6

- Round 16 – Round 22

== Feeder clubs ==
Melbourne continued their relationships with both the Cronulla-Sutherland Sharks and Easts Tigers to send any reserve players to play in their respective state cup competitions.

In the New South Wales Cup, Cronulla were coached by Tony Herman, and finished the regular season in first position. After losing their first final against the fourth-placed Windsor Wolves, the Sharks would regroup to win an elimination semi-final against the Newtown Jets, and qualify for the Grand Final by defeating the North Sydney Bears.

Cronulla would win their first premiership in any competition for 17 years, winning the Grand Final against the Windsor Wolves. Four Melbourne contracted players: Kirisome Auva'a, Young Tonumaipea, Siosaia Vave, and Junior Moors were all members of the premiership team.

2013 New South Wales Cup
Pos	Team	Pld	W	D	L	B	PF	PA	PD	Pts
1	Cronulla-Sutherland Sharks(P)	24	19	1	4	2	695	332	+363	43

2013 NSW Cup Grand Final

Sunday, 6 October
13:50 AEDT (UTC+11)

Cronulla-Sutherland Sharks	36 – 8	Windsor Wolves
Tries: 6 Auva'a 59', 77'; Manumalealuii 19'; Peachey 24'; Lichaa 38'; Moors 62'; Goals: 6 Townsend (6/7)	1st: 18–8; 2nd: 18–0; Reports	Tries: 2 Nabuli 9', 31'; Goals: 0 Naiqama (0/2)

ANZ Stadium, Sydney
Referee: Zbigniew Przekiasa-Adamski

In the Queensland Cup, Easts Tigers under new coach Craig Ingebrigtsen, finished in third position to qualify for the finals. The Tigers would qualify for their third Queensland Cup Grand Final after defeating second-placed Mackay Cutters in a qualifying final, progressing through the Grand Final after defeating minor premiers Northern Pride in a major semi final at Barlow Park in Cairns.

In the Grand Final, the Tigers took on Mackay at North Ipswich Reserve. The Tigers would score first through the Storm's Junior Sa'u and would go to half time leading 14–10 thanks to Sa'u second try just before the break. The Cutters would take the lead in the second half, until Mitch Garbutt's converted try levelled the scores with ten minutes remaining. The Cutters would retake the lead with a field goal in the 74th minute, scoring a try in the 79th minute to seal victory.

Easts Tigers halfback Cody Walker won the competition's best and fairest award ahead of joining the Storm in 2014.

2013 Queensland Cup
Pos	Team	Pld	W	D	L	B	PF	PA	PD	Pts
3	Easts Tigers	22	13	0	9	2	628	371	+257	30

2013 Queensland Cup Grand Final

Sunday, 29 September
15:50 AEST (UTC+10)

Easts Tigers	20 – 27	Mackay Cutters
Tries: 3 Sa'u 9', 38'; Garbutt 69'; Goals: 4 Walker 9', pen 25', 39', 70' (4/4)	1st: 14–10; 2nd: 6–17; Report	Tries: 5 Faraimo 29', 32'; Milne 47'; Morgan 64'; Mitchell 79'; Goals: 3 Taylor 34' (1/3); Minto 65' (1/1); Milne 80' (1/1); Field goals: 1 Minto 74'; Sin bins: 1 Taylor (yellow card)

North Ipswich Reserve
Attendance: 6,706
Referee: Clayton Sharpe
Duncan Hall Medal: Anthony Mitchell (Mackay)

== Awards ==
=== Trophy Cabinet ===
- 2013 World Club Challenge Trophy

=== Melbourne Storm Awards Night ===
Held at Peninsula Docklands on Friday 11 October 2013.

- Melbourne Storm Player of the Year: Cameron Smith
- Melbourne Storm Rookie of the Year: Tohu Harris
- Members' Player of Year: Cameron Smith
- Melbourne Storm Most Improved: Kenny Bromwich
- Melbourne Storm Best Back: Cooper Cronk
- Melbourne Storm Best Forward: Jesse Bromwich
- Darren Bell Medal U20s Player of Year: Pride Petterson-Robati
- Greg Brentnall Young Achiever’s Award: Brandon Manase
- U20s Best Back: Dane Chang
- U20s Best Forward: Christian Welch
- Mick Moore Club Person of the Year: Ross Patison
- Life Member Inductees: Ryan Hoffman & Tony Devers
- Best try: Will Chambers

=== Dally M Awards Night ===
The NRL Dally M Awards were held on 1 October 2013.

- Dally M Medal: Cooper Cronk
- Dally M Captain of the Year: Cameron Smith
- Dally M Representative Player of the Year: Cameron Smith
- Dally M Hooker of the Year: Cameron Smith
- Dally M Halfback of the Year: Cooper Cronk

=== RLPA Awards Night ===
- RLPA Australia Representative Player of the Year: Cameron Smith
- NRL Academic Player of the Year: Bryan Norrie

=== Additional Awards ===
- World Club Challenge Medal: Cooper Cronk
- QRL Ron McAuliffe Medal: Cameron Smith
- Petero Civoniceva Medal: Cody Walker
