= 2012 Melbourne Storm season =

Rugby League team season

- 2012 NRL premiers
- NRL Rank: 2nd
- Play-off result: Premiers
- 2012 record: Wins: 17; draws: 0; losses: 7
- Points scored: For: 579; against: 361

Team information
- CEO: Ron Gauci
- Coach: Craig Bellamy
- Captain: Cameron Smith (25 games) Ryan Hoffman (1 game) Cooper Cronk (1 game)
- Stadium: AAMI Park – 30,050
- Avg. attendance: 12,685
- High attendance: 20,333 (Round 8) (Note: Regular season home games only)

Top scorers
- Tries: Billy Slater (16)
- Goals: Cameron Smith (78)
- Points: Cameron Smith (164)
← 2011	List of seasons	2013 →

The 2012 Melbourne Storm season was the club's 15th NRL season. Coached by Craig Bellamy and captained by Cameron Smith, they competed in and won the NRL's 2012 Telstra Premiership. The first nine weeks of the season were very successful, with the club winning all games for what was at the time their best start to a season. From round 10 to round 21 they won only three games and lost seven, including a five-game losing streak between rounds 16 and 21, their second worst ever. From round 22 onward they recovered their winning form and finished the regular season with five straight wins, finishing in second place. The Storm then went on to defeat South Sydney and Manly in the finals series before going on to face minor premiers, the Canterbury-Bankstown Bulldogs in the 2012 NRL Grand Final, winning 14–4 to claim the Premiership.

== Season summary ==
- 19 January – Will Chambers returns to the club after two seasons playing rugby union.
- Pre-season – Melbourne play Queensland Cup affiliate team Easts Tigers for the Darren Bell Cup in a pre-season trial fixture at Langlands Park. Bell, who was the recruitment manager at the club died of a heart attack late in 2011. Melbourne win the match 36–8 scoring seven tries to two. Will Chambers scoring the first try in his return to rugby league.
- 10 February – The Australian Rugby League Commission announces that they have guaranteed $26.5m in funding for the club as part of an agreement with News Limited, with the competition gaining their independence from the media conglomerate.
- 18 February – In front of 11,752 fans at the North Hobart Oval in Tasmania, Melbourne defeat the Brisbane Broncos 34–30 in their final trial match before the start of the season. Fullback Billy Slater scoring a double in his first action for the year. Melbourne had led 34–16 until late in the game, with Ryan Hinchcliffe stretchered from the field with seven minutes left following an ugly tackle from Petero Civoniceva.
- Round 1 – Melbourne continue the round 1 winning streak, defeating the Canberra Raiders 24–19 at Canberra Stadium. Raiders coach David Furner unhappy with the tackling technique of the Melbourne players dubbed the "chin strap." The victory was Melbourne's ninth straight round 1 victory under Craig Bellamy. The victory secured by a late try to Billy Slater after Josh Dugan had put the Raiders in front via a field goal with seven minutes remaining.
- Round 3 – Billy Slater scored two tries against the Gold Coast Titans to take his career total to 130, going past Rhys Wesser to become the highest try scoring fullback in Australian Rugby League history.
- Round 4 – With his fourth consecutive double, Billy Slater makes premiership history as the first player to complete four try doubles to start a season, with Melbourne the only undefeated team.
- 29 March – Cooper Cronk re-signs with the club for a further four seasons.
- Round 5 – Melbourne celebrated their 15th anniversary with a win against the Newcastle Knights, coming in Ryan Hinchcliffe's 100th NRL match and Bryan Norrie's 50th match for the club.
- Round 6 – A dominant performance from Cooper Cronk helps Melbourne to a 42–18 win over the North Queensland Cowboys, despite the Cowboys scoring the first try of the match.
- Round 7 – Melbourne equal the club's best start to a season (2007) with their seventh straight win, winning a tight 12–6 match against the Bulldogs.
- Round 8 – On ANZAC Day, Melbourne record an eighth straight win for the season, outlasting the New Zealand Warriors 32–14 after scores were level with 20 minutes remaining. The victory completing the best start to a season in the club's history.
- Round 9 – Justin O'Neill scores a hat trick in the club's 44–10 thrashing of Penrith Panthers.
- Round 10 – Cronulla end Melbourne's winning streak at nine matches, defeating the Storm 12–10 at Toyota Park with former Storm player Jeremy Smith scoring the match-winning try after Melbourne had taken a 10–6 lead into half time.
- Round 12 – Melbourne hand the Brisbane Broncos a 34–10 defeat at AAMI Park on the Friday night after Origin I. Will Chambers played his 50th match, while Todd Lowrie played his 50th match for the Storm. Michael Greenfield makes his club debut, but is knocked out by a shoulder charge from Ben Te'o. With a history of neck issues, Greenfield never plays again after undergoing neck surgery.
- Round 13 – In Todd Lowrie's 150th NRL appearance, Melbourne retain the Michael Moore Trophy, coming from 12–0 down to defeat the Warriors in Auckland.
- 6 June – Will Chambers is hospitalised with a rare blood disorder that could have proved fatal if left untreated.
- Round 14 – With several players absent through Origin duty, Wests Tigers upset Melbourne to win their first ever game in Victoria. Ryan Hoffman captains the team in the absence of Cameron Smith, in what was coach Craig Bellamy's 250th match in charge. It is Melbourne's first loss on a Friday night in Victoria for 11 years.
- 14 June – Billy Slater is ruled out of action for up to six weeks due to a knee injury.
- Round 15 – Missing Slater, Melbourne defeat Manly 26–22 at Brookvale Oval, winning there for the first time since 2009.
- Round 16 – Video referee Shaun Hampstead controversially denies a try to Ryan Hinchcliffe in what proves to be a turning point in the club's 20–4 loss to the Bulldogs in Mackay.
- Round 18 – With defence described by Craig Bellamy as "downright embarrassing," Canberra hand Melbourne a 40–12 defeat at AAMI Park.
- Round 19 – North Queensland win their first match in Melbourne in 11 years, handing Melbourne a third straight defeat in Cooper Cronk's 200th NRL game.
- Round 20 – Days after announcing they were parting ways with coach Stephen Kearney, wooden spoon favourites the Parramatta Eels shock Melbourne 16–10. With their fourth consecutive loss, the Storm equalled their second worst losing streak in club history. Craig Bellamy describing his team as "pathetic."
- Round 21 – Despite the return of Billy Slater, the Storm record a new second-worst losing streak with their fifth consecutive loss, with the Dragons sending Melbourne home from Wollongong 26–18 losers. It was the Storm's longest losing streak during Craig Bellamy's ten-year tenure. The match was Anthony Quinn's 100th appearance for the club.
- Round 22 – With a try after 35 seconds to Sisa Waqa, Melbourne end their losing streak with a 46–6 defeat of the Penrith Panthers. The 46 points was also the Storm's highest score of the season.
- Round 23 – Mahe Fonua becomes the first born and bred Victorian to play NRL for the Storm, making his debut in a 24–16 win over the Gold Coast Titans at AAMI Park. Melbourne had trailled 10–0 at half time, before getting on top of the visitors in the second half. Jessie Bromwich also played his 50th game for the Storm.
- Round 24 – Cooper Cronk scores the match-winning field goal with six minutes remaining to secure a 19–18 win over the Brisbane Broncos at Suncorp Stadium. With his second conversion of the match, Cameron Smith scored his 1300th career point.
- Round 25 – Down 18–10 with three minutes remaining, Melbourne score two late tries to come from behind to win 20–18 against the Sharks. Will Chambers scoring the match winner with just 24 seconds remaining. The result meant that the Storm's overall wins percentage increased to 63.64%, elevating the Storm to first place on the 'all-time' score table for the first time, ahead of the Brisbane Broncos.
- Round 26 – Melbourne end the regular season with a 26–6 victory over the Wests Tigers to secure second position on the NRL ladder. After winning the NRL Club Championship in 2011, Melbourne finish third behind the Bulldogs, with the Toyota Cup team finishing in 9th position.
- Qualifying final – The Storm began their finals campaign with a 24–6 win over the South Sydney Rabbitohs, earning them a week's break and a home preliminary final. Melbourne had blown the visitors off AAMI Park in the first half, taking an 18–0 lead.
- 13 September – Melbourne announce the signing of Lagi Setu who last played for the Brisbane Broncos in 2010 before embarking on missionary work. The club also announcing the signing of Junior Moors from the Wests Tigers, with both players joining the club for the 2013 season.
- Preliminary final – two tries each to Billy Slater and Cooper Cronk help Melbourne complete a 40–12 defeat of Manly to secure a spot in the Grand Final against the Bulldogs. Ryan Hinchcliffe plays his 100th match for the club.

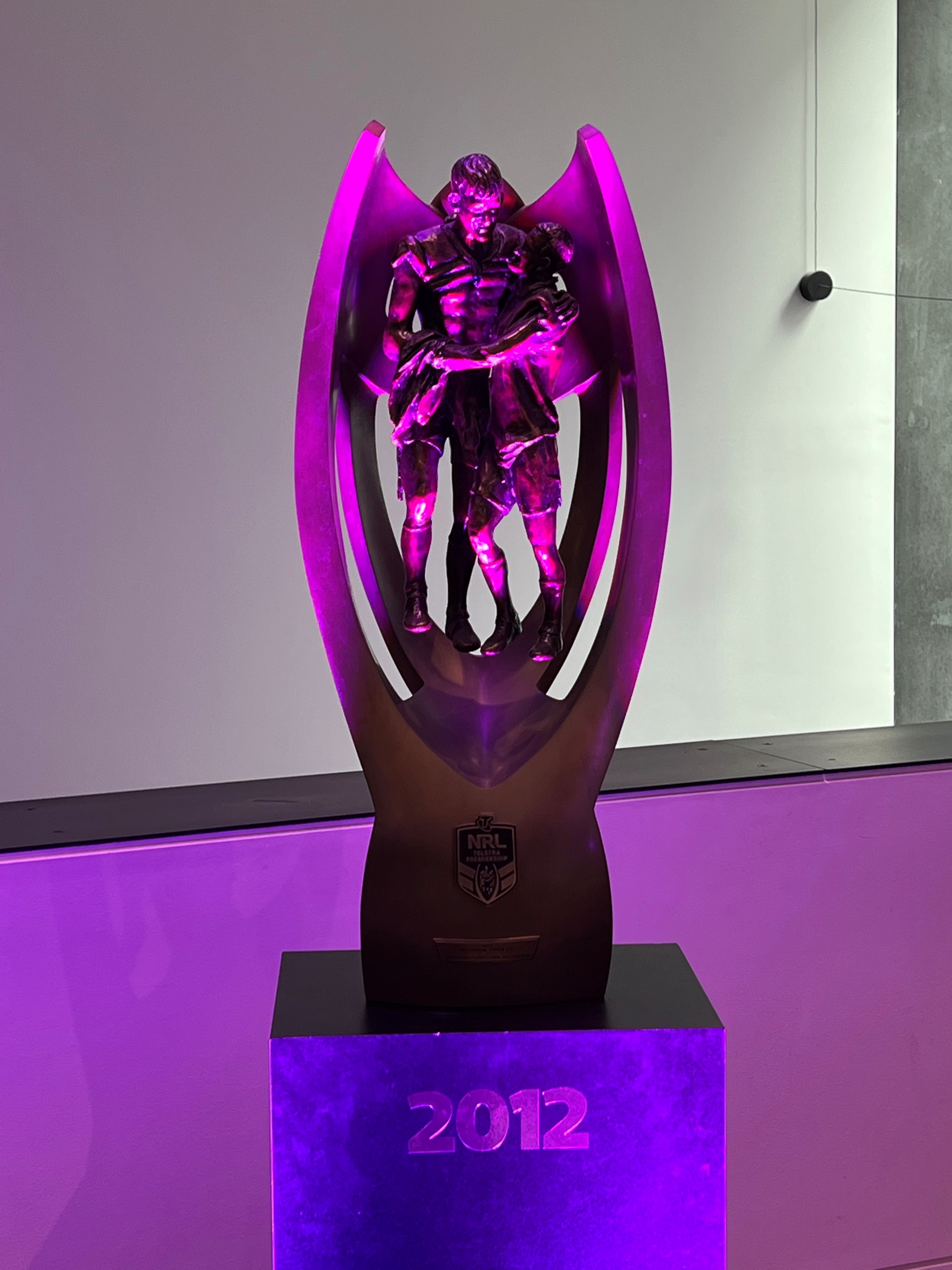
2012 NRL Premiership trophy (on display in 2022)

- Grand Final – Melbourne defeat the Canterbury-Bankstown Bulldogs 14–4 to claim the 2012 NRL premiership. Halfback Cooper Cronk is awarded the Clive Churchill Medal as player of the match. Melbourne were first to score and would take a 14–4 lead into half time, with the second half remaining scoreless. Bulldogs forward James Graham is alleged to have bitten the ear of Billy Slater during a first half melee, with Graham later suspended by the NRL Judiciary for 12 matches. Cameron Smith, while having a bad night with the boot (1 from 5 attempts), kicked his 600th career goal.

=== Milestone games ===
Round	Player	Milestone
Round 1	Siosaia Vave	Storm debut
Round 2	Jason Ryles	Storm debut
Round 5	Ryan Hinchcliffe	100th game
Round 12	Michael Greenfield	Storm debut
Round 12	Will Chambers	50th game
Round 13	Todd Lowrie	150th NRL game
Round 14	Craig Bellamy	250th game coached
Round 18	Anthony Quinn	200th game
Round 19	Cooper Cronk	200th game
Round 20	Richard Fa'aoso	Storm debut
Round 23	Jesse Bromwich	50th game
Round 23	Mahe Fonua	NRL debut
Round 25	Gareth Widdop	50th game

=== Jerseys ===
In 2012 the Storm jerseys were made by Kooga. They retained their predominantly purple home jersey, and predominantly white away jerseys from the previous two seasons.

Heritage

In round 5 for the NRL's heritage round, Melbourne again wore a replica of the original 1998 home jersey.

Special

For the round 12 home game against the Brisbane Broncos, Melbourne again wore a special "battle" jersey similar to the one wore in 2011 featuring a silver chevron design with a purple camouflage motif.

In round 19 against the North Queensland Cowboys at AAMI Park, the players wore a one-off promotional jersey was worn to promote The Dark Knight Rises. The jersey was predominantly black with the Batman logo on the front and back.

Indigenous

For the first time in club history, Melbourne wore an indigenous design in the round 22 match against the Penrith Panthers. The promotion was a part of the NRL's Close the Gap round, a campaign the NRL had begun supporting in partnership with Oxfam in 2010. The jersey was mostly orange, a colour never worn previously by the club, and featured the Storm’s Reconciliation Action Plan (RAP) logo which was designed by Lenny Briggs and Dixon Patten.

=== Attendance averages ===
	Total	Matches	Average
Home	152,217	12	12,685
Away	180,710	12	15,059
All regular season games	332,927	24	13,872
Finals	128,269	3	42,756
All Games	461,196	27	17,081

== Fixtures ==
=== Preseason ===
Date	Rd	Opponent	Venue	Result	Mel.	Opp.	Tries	Goals	Field goals	Ref
4 February	Trial	Easts Tigers	Langlands Park, Brisbane	Won	36	8	M Fonua (2), Y Tonumaipea (2), W Chambers, S Waqa, R Pooley			
11 February	Trial	Canberra Raiders	Lavington Sports Ground, Albury	Lost	18	27	T Lowrie, M McGahan, R Hinchcliffe, R Hoffman	L Kelly		
18 February	Trial	Brisbane Broncos	North Hobart Oval, Hobart	Won	34	30	B Slater (2), C Cronk (2), G Widdop, M Fonua	C Smith 5/6		

=== Regular season ===
==== Result by round ====
Round	1	2	3	4	5	6	7	8	9	10	11	12	13	14	15	16	17	18	19	20	21	22	23	24	25	26
Ground	A	H	A	H	H	A	H	H	A	A	–	H	A	H	A	A	–	H	H	A	A	H	H	A	H	A
Result	W	W	W	W	W	W	W	W	W	L	B	W	W	L	W	L	B	L	L	L	L	W	W	W	W	W
Position	5	2	2	1	1	1	1	1	1	1	1	1	1	1	1	1	1	1	1	2	3	3	2	2	2	2
Points	2	4	6	8	10	12	14	16	18	18	20	22	24	24	26	26	28	28	28	28	28	30	32	34	36	38

Source: Rugby League Tables
A = Away; H = Home; N = Neutral; B = Bye; W = Win; D = Draw; L = Loss

==== Matches ====
- (g.p.) – Golden Point extra time
- (pen) – Penalty try

Date	Rd	Opponent	Venue	Result	Mel.	Opp.	Tries	Goals	Field goals	Ref
3 March	1	Canberra Raiders	Canberra Stadium, Canberra	Won	24	19	B Slater (2), C Cronk, J O'Neill	C Smith 4/4		
11 March	2	South Sydney Rabbitohs	AAMI Park, Melbourne	Won	24	10	D Nielsen (2), B Slater (2), M Duffie	C Smith 2/5		
18 March	3	Gold Coast Titans	Skilled Park, Gold Coast	Won	30	6	M Duffie (2), B Slater (2), S Manu, A Quinn	C Smith 2/5, G Widdop 1/1		
24 March	4	Sydney Roosters	AAMI Park, Melbourne	Won	44	4	B Slater (2), C Cronk (2), D Nielsen, K Proctor, R Hoffman, W Chambers	C Smith 5/7, G Widdop 1/1		
31 March	5 (Note: Heritage Round)	Newcastle Knights	AAMI Park, Melbourne	Won	34	22	G Widdop, M Duffie, R Hoffman, B Slater, W Chambers, T Lowrie	C Smith 5/6		
8 April	6	North Queensland Cowboys	Dairy Farmers Stadium, Townsville	Won	42	18	M Duffie (2), K Proctor (2), W Chambers (2), R Hinchcliffe, J Ryles	C Smith 5/8		
14 April	7	Canterbury-Bankstown Bulldogs	AAMI Park, Melbourne	Won	12	6	R Hinchcliffe, R Hoffman	C Smith 2/2	C Cronk 0/1	
25 April	8 (Note: ANZAC Day)	New Zealand Warriors	AAMI Park, Melbourne	Won	32	14	W Chambers (3), D Nielsen (2), J O'Neill	C Smith 4/6		
5 May	9	Penrith Panthers	Centrebet Stadium, Sydney	Won	44	10	J O'Neill (3), M Duffie, C Cronk, R Hoffman, W Chambers, R Hinchcliffe	C Smith 5/7, G Widdop 1/1		
13 May	10	Cronulla-Sutherland Sharks	Toyota Stadium, Sydney	Lost	10	12	D Nielsen, M Duffie	C Smith 1/2		
20 May	11	Bye								
25 May	12	Brisbane Broncos	AAMI Park, Melbourne	Won	34	10	T Lowrie (2), B Slater (2), W Chambers, J O'Neill	G Widdop 5/6		
3 June	13	New Zealand Warriors	Mount Smart Stadium, Auckland	Won	22	10	G Widdop, J Lowe, W Chambers, C Smith	C Smith 3/5		
8 June	14	Wests Tigers	AAMI Park, Melbourne	Lost	6	10	D Nielsen	G Widdop 1/2		
18 June	15	Manly Warringah Sea Eagles	Brookvale Oval, Sydney	Won	26	22	T Lowrie, C Smith, B Norrie, M Duffie	C Smith 5/5		
24 June	16	Canterbury-Bankstown Bulldogs	Virgin Australia Stadium, Mackay	Lost	4	20	A Quinn	C Smith 0/1		
30 June	17	Bye								
7 July	18	Canberra Raiders	AAMI Park, Melbourne	Lost	12	40	J O'Neill (2)	G Widdop 2/2		
14 July	19	North Queensland Cowboys	AAMI Park, Melbourne	Lost	16	20	M Duffie, A Quinn, G Widdop	C Smith 2/3		
21 July	20	Parramatta Eels	Parramatta Stadium, Parramatta	Lost	10	16	R Kostjasyn, R Hoffman	C Smith 1/2		
27 July	21	St George-Illawarra Dragons	WIN Stadium, Wollongong	Lost	18	26	W Chambers, R Hinchcliffe, K Proctor	C Smith 3/3		
4 August	22	Penrith Panthers	AAMI Park, Melbourne	Won	46	6	C Cronk (2), J O'Neill (2), S Waqa (2), J Bromwich, S Manu	C Smith 7/8		
10 August	23	Gold Coast Titans	AAMI Park, Melbourne	Won	24	16	B Slater, C Cronk, R Hoffman, G Widdop	C Smith 4/4		
17 August	24	Brisbane Broncos	Suncorp Stadium, Brisbane	Won	19	18	S Waqa (2), C Cronk	C Smith 3/3	C Cronk 1/1	
27 August	25	Cronulla Sharks	AAMI Park, Melbourne	Won	20	18	R Hoffman (2), S Waqa, W Chambers	C Smith 2/4		
1 September	26	Wests Tigers	Leichhardt Oval, Sydney	Won	26	6	R Hoffman, S Manu, B Norrie, K Proctor, S Waqa	C Smith 3/5		

Fixture notes:

=== Finals ===
Second qualifying final

Saturday, 8 September
17:45 AEST (UTC+10)

Melbourne Storm	24 – 6	South Sydney Rabbitohs
Tries: 4 Hoffman 7'; Slater 24'; Fonua 35'; Waqa 46'; Goals: 4 Smith 9', pen 12', 26', 48' (4/5)	1st: 18–0; 2nd: 6–6; Report	Tries: 1 Pettybourne 72'; Goals: 1 Reynolds 73'

AAMI Park, Melbourne
Attendance: 19,750
Referee: Shayne Hayne, Jason Robinson

Second preliminary final

Friday, 21 September
19:45 AEST (UTC+10)

Melbourne Storm	40 – 12	Manly-Warringah Sea Eagles
Tries: 7 Cronk 5', 44'; Slater 9', 66'; Chambers 19'; J Bromwich 60'; Proctor 76'; Goals: 6 Smith 45', pen 51', 62', 67', pen 73' (5/8); Widdop 78' (1/1)	1st: 12–6; 2nd: 28–6; Report	Tries: 2 Lyon 37', 52'; Goals: 2 Lyon 38', 53' (2/2)

AAMI Park, Melbourne
Attendance: 25,543
Referee: Tony Archer, Matt Cecchin

2012 NRL Grand Final

Sunday, 30 September
17:00 AEST (UTC+10)

Canterbury-Bankstown Bulldogs	4 – 14	Melbourne Storm
Tries: 1 Perrett 25'; Goals: Inu (0/1)	1st: 4–14; 2nd: 0–0; Report	Tries: 3 Hoffman 7'; Slater 32'; O'Neill 39'; Goals: 1 Smith 32' (1/3)

ANZ Stadium, Sydney
Attendance: 82,976
Referees: Tony Archer, Ben Cummins
Clive Churchill Medal: Cooper Cronk (Melbourne)

== Ladder ==
2012 NRL season
Pos	Team	Pld	W	D	L	B	PF	PA	PD	Pts
1	Canterbury-Bankstown Bulldogs	24	18	0	6	2	568	369	+199	40
2	Melbourne Storm (P)	24	17	0	7	2	579	361	+218	38
3	South Sydney Rabbitohs	24	16	0	8	2	559	438	+121	36
4	Manly Warringah Sea Eagles	24	16	0	8	2	497	403	+94	36
5	North Queensland Cowboys	24	15	0	9	2	597	445	+152	34
6	Canberra Raiders	24	13	0	11	2	545	536	+9	30
7	Cronulla-Sutherland Sharks	24	12	1	11	2	445	441	+4	29
8	Brisbane Broncos	24	12	0	12	2	481	447	+34	28
9	St. George Illawarra Dragons	24	11	0	13	2	405	438	-33	26
10	Wests Tigers	24	11	0	13	2	506	551	-45	26
11	Gold Coast Titans	24	10	0	14	2	449	477	-28	24
12	Newcastle Knights	24	10	0	14	2	448	488	-40	24
13	Sydney Roosters	24	8	1	15	2	462	626	-164	21
14	New Zealand Warriors	24	8	0	16	2	497	609	-112	20
15	Penrith Panthers	24	8	0	16	2	409	575	-166	20
16	Parramatta Eels	24	6	0	18	2	431	674	-243	16

== 2012 Coaching Staff ==
=== NRL ===
- Head coach: Craig Bellamy
- Assistant coaches: David Kidwell & Kevin Walters
- Development coach: Adam O'Brien
- Specialist coach: Robbie Kearns
- Tackling Coach: John Donohue
- Performance coach: Mick Martin
- Strength and conditioning Coach: Alex Corvo
- Assistant Strength and Conditioning Coaches: Adrian Jiminez & Dan Di Pasqua
- Head physiotherapist: Kieran Morgan
- Assistant physiotherapist: Andrew Nawrocki
- Head Trainer: Craig Sultana
- General Manager Football Operations: Frank Ponissi
- Recruitment manager: Paul Bunn

=== NRL Under 20s ===
- Head coach: Dean Pay
- Assistant coach: Troy Thompson
- Development coaches: Tony Adam & Chad Buckby
- High Performance Manager: Chris Jones
- Physiotherapist: Aaron Howlett
- Strength and conditioning Coach: Adrian Jiminez

== 2012 Squad ==
Cap	Nat.	Player name	Position	First Storm game	Previous First Grade RL club (Note: Previous First Grade RL club: This column denotes the previous RL club the player was signed to and played first grade RL for. If they are yet to debut then this is stipulated. If they were merely signed to the club but did not play then it is not counted)
55	(Australia)	Cameron Smith (c)	HK	2002	(Australia) Melbourne Storm
58	(Australia)	Billy Slater	FB	2003	(Australia) Melbourne Storm
62	(Australia)	Ryan Hoffman	SR, LK	2003	(Australia) Melbourne Storm
73	(Australia)	Cooper Cronk	HB	2004	(Australia) Melbourne Storm
91	(Australia)	Anthony Quinn	WG, CE	2007	(Australia) Newcastle Knights
97	(Australia)	Will Chambers	CE	2007	(Australia) Queensland Reds
98	(New Zealand)	Sika Manu	SR	2007	(Australia) Melbourne Storm
104	(Australia)	Dane Nielsen	WG, CE	2008	(Australia) Melbourne Storm
105	(New Zealand)	Kevin Proctor	SR	2008	(Australia) Melbourne Storm
110	(Australia)	Ryan Hinchcliffe	HK, LK	2009	(Australia) Canberra Raiders
116	(Australia)	Luke Kelly	FE, HB	2009	(Australia) Melbourne Storm
119	(New Zealand)	Jesse Bromwich	PR	2010	(Australia) Melbourne Storm
120	(Republic of Ireland)	Rory Kostjasyn	HK, LK	2010	(Australia) Melbourne Storm
121	(Australia)	Todd Lowrie	SR, LK	2010	(Australia) Parramatta Eels
123	(Australia)	Bryan Norrie	PR	2010	(Australia) Cronulla Sharks
124	(New Zealand)	Matt Duffie	WG, CE	2010	(Australia) Melbourne Storm
125	(England)	Gareth Widdop	HB	2010	(Australia) Melbourne Storm
127	(Vanuatu)	Justin O'Neill	WG	2010	(Australia) Sydney Roosters
130	(Australia)	Jaiman Lowe	PR, SR	2011	(Australia) South Sydney Rabbitohs
134	(Australia)	Maurice Blair	WG, CE	2011	(Australia) Penrith Panthers
136	(Fiji)	Sisa Waqa	CE, WG	2011	(Australia) Sydney Roosters
138	(Samoa)	Jack Afamasaga	PR	2011	(Australia) Cronulla Sharks
139	(Tonga)	Siosaia Vave	PR	2012	(Australia) Cronulla Sharks
140	(Australia)	Jason Ryles	PR	2012	(Australia) Sydney Roosters
141	(Australia)	Michael Greenfield	SR, LK	2012	(Australia) St George Illawarra Dragons
142	(Tonga)	Richard Fa'aoso	PR, SR	2012	(Australia) Newcastle Knights
143	(Tonga)	Mahe Fonua	CE	2012	(Australia) Melbourne Storm
-	(Samoa)	Kirisome Auva'a	WG	Yet to Debut	(Australia) Melbourne Storm
-	(New Zealand)	Kenny Bromwich	PR, LK	Yet to Debut	(Australia) Melbourne Storm
-	(Australia)	Mitch Garbutt	PR, SR	Yet to Debut	(Australia) Melbourne Storm
-	(New Zealand)	Slade Griffen	HK	Yet to Debut	(Australia) Melbourne Storm
-	(Australia)	Ben Hampton	HB	Yet to Debut	(Australia) Melbourne Storm
-	(New Zealand)	Tohu Harris	SR	Yet to Debut	(Australia) Melbourne Storm
-	(New Zealand)	Matt McGahan	HB, FE	Yet to Debut	(Australia) Melbourne Storm
-	(Australia)	Jordan McLean	PR	Yet to Debut	(Australia) Melbourne Storm
-	(New Zealand)	Shea Moylan	WG, FB	Yet to Debut	(Australia) Brisbane Broncos

== 2012 Premiership Team ==
Melbourne Storm
2012 Premiership Team	Interchange	Coach
1 Billy Slater – FB; 2 Sisa Waqa – WG; 3 Dane Neilsen – CE; 4 Will Chambers – CE; 5 Justin O'Neill – WG; 6 Gareth Widdop – FE; 7 Cooper Cronk – HB; 8 Jesse Bromwich – PR; 9 Cameron Smith (c) – HK; 10 Bryan Norrie – PR; 11 Kevin Proctor – SR; 12 Ryan Hoffman – SR; 13 Todd Lowrie – LK	14 Sika Manu; 15 Ryan Hinchcliffe; 16 Jaiman Lowe; 17 Richie Fa'aoso	Head coach: Craig Bellamy; Legend: (c) Captain(s); (vc) Vice-captain(s)

== Player movement ==
Losses

- Adam Blair to Wests Tigers
- Beau Champion to Gold Coast Titans
- Dane Chisholm to Wests Tigers
- Sione Kite to Widnes Vikings
- Robert Rochow to Newcastle Knights
- Chase Stanley to St. George Illawarra Dragons
- Troy Thompson to Retired
- Atelea Vea to St. George Illawarra Dragons
- Adam Woolnough to Retired

Gains

- Will Chambers from Queensland Reds (rugby)
- Michael Greenfield from St. George Illawarra Dragons
- Ryan Hoffman from Wigan Warriors
- Jason Ryles from Sydney Roosters

== Representative honours ==
The following players have played a representative match in 2012.

- (C) = Captain

Player	2012 All Stars match	City Vs Country	2012 ANZAC Test	State of Origin 1	State of Origin 2	State of Origin 3	Test match
Cooper Cronk	NRL All Stars	—N/a	Australia	Queensland	Queensland	Queensland	Australia
Ryan Hoffman	—N/a	City	—N/a	—N/a	—N/a	—N/a	Australia
Ryan Hinchcliffe	—N/a	Country	—N/a	—N/a	—N/a	—N/a	—N/a
Billy Slater	—N/a	—N/a	Australia	Queensland	Queensland		Australia
Cameron Smith	—N/a	—N/a	Australia (C)	Queensland (C)	Queensland (C)	Queensland (C)	Australia (C)
Jesse Bromwich	—N/a	—N/a	New Zealand	—N/a	—N/a	—N/a	New Zealand
Dane Nielsen	—N/a	—N/a	—N/a	—N/a	—N/a	Queensland	—N/a
Kevin Proctor	—N/a	—N/a	—N/a	—N/a	—N/a	—N/a	New Zealand

== Statistics ==
This table contains playing statistics for all Melbourne Storm players to have played in the 2012 NRL season.

- Statistics sources:

Name	Appearances	Tries	Goals	Field goals	Points
Maurice Blair	4	0	0	0	0
Jesse Bromwich	27	2	0	0	8
Will Chambers	18	13	0	0	52
Cooper Cronk	26	10	0	1	41
Matt Duffie	17	10	0	0	40
Richard Fa'aoso	6	0	0	0	0
Mahe Fonua	4	1	0	0	4
Michael Greenfield	1	0	0	0	0
Ryan Hinchcliffe	27	4	0	0	16
Ryan Hoffman	27	11	0	0	44
Luke Kelly	1	0	0	0	0
Rory Kostjasyn	14	1	0	0	4
Jaiman Lowe	15	1	0	0	4
Todd Lowrie	23	4	0	0	16
Sika Manu	19	3	0	0	12
Dane Nielsen	22	7	0	0	28
Bryan Norrie	25	2	0	0	8
Justin O'Neill	21	11	0	0	44
Kevin Proctor	23	6	0	0	24
Anthony Quinn	20	3	0	0	12
Jason Ryles	22	1	0	0	4
Billy Slater	21	16	0	0	64
Cameron Smith	25	2	78 (Note: Goalkicking percentage 69.03% (78/113))	0	164
Siosaia Vave	14	0	0	0	0
Sisa Waqa	11	7	0	0	28
Gareth Widdop	26	4	12 (Note: Goalkicking percentage 80% (12/14))	0	40
26 players used	–	119	90	1	657

=== Scorers ===
Most points in a game: 14

- Round 15 – Cameron Smith (1 try, 5 goals) vs Manly Sea Eagles
- Round 22 – Cameron Smith (7 goals) vs Penrith Panthers

Most tries in a game: 3

- Round 8 – Will Chambers vs New Zealand Warriors
- Round 9 – Justin O'Neill vs Penrith Panthers

=== Winning games ===
Highest score in a winning game: 46 points

- Round 22 vs Penrith Panthers

Lowest score in a winning game: 12 points

- Round 7 vs Canterbury Bulldogs

Greatest winning margin: 40 points

- Round 22 vs Penrith Panthers

Greatest number of games won consecutively: 9

- Round 1 – Round 9

=== Losing games ===
Highest score in a losing game: 18 points

- Round 21 vs St George Illawarra Dragons

Lowest score in a losing game: 4 points

- Round 16 vs Canterbury Bulldogs

Greatest losing margin: 28 points

- Round 18 vs Canberra Raiders

Greatest number of games lost consecutively: 5

- Round 16 – Round 21

== NRL Under-20s ==
In the fifth season of the NRL's National Youth Championship, Dean Pay continued as coach for a third season, with Melbourne finishing the regular season in 9th place on the ladder, meaning the club would not qualify for the finals for the first time since the 2008 season. Ben Hampton was selected as halfback and captain for Queensland in the mid-season Under-20s Origin match, with Young Tonumaipea selected on the wing for the winning New South Wales team.

In October, Hampton and Mahe Fonua would be selected for the Junior Kangaroos team that would defeat a Junior Kiwis team that included fellow Storm teammate Tohu Harris.

=== Ladder ===
2012 National Youth Competition season
Pos.	Team	Pld	W	D	L	B	PF	PA	PD	Pts
1	Canterbury Bulldogs	24	17	1	6	2	774	517	+257	39
2	New Zealand Warriors	24	17	1	6	2	680	516	+164	39
3	Canberra Raiders	24	16	0	8	2	766	599	+167	36
4	Wests Tigers (P)	24	15	0	9	2	666	514	+152	34
5	Penrith Panthers	24	14	1	9	2	694	501	+193	33
6	South Sydney Rabbitohs	24	14	1	9	2	734	592	+142	33
7	Sydney Roosters	24	13	2	9	2	694	570	+124	32
8	St. George Illawarra Dragons	24	13	1	10	2	638	553	+85	31
9	Melbourne Storm	24	12	2	10	2	547	556	−9	30
10	Cronulla Sharks	24	11	2	11	2	619	684	−65	28
11	Newcastle Knights	24	10	1	13	2	646	574	+72	25
12	Brisbane Broncos	24	9	0	15	2	629	790	−161	22
13	North Queensland Cowboys	24	7	2	15	2	545	732	−187	20
14	Manly Sea Eagles	24	6	2	16	2	519	811	−292	18
15	Parramatta Eels	24	5	0	19	2	558	814	−256	14
16	Gold Coast Titans	24	5	0	19	2	424	810	−386	14

=== Statistics ===
==== Scorers ====
Most points in a game: 20 points

- Round 24 – Jack Joass (1 try, 8 goals) vs Brisbane Broncos

Most tries in a game: 4

- Round 19 – Kirisome Auva'a vs North Queensland Cowboys

Most points (season): 106

- Jack Joass (6 tries, 41 goals)

Most tries (season): 19

- Kirisome Auva'a

==== Winning games ====
Highest score in a winning game: 60 points

- Round 24 vs Brisbane Broncos

Lowest score in a winning game: 12 points

- Round 14 vs Wests Tigers

Greatest winning margin: 42 points

- Round 24 vs Brisbane Broncos

Greatest number of games won consecutively: 4

- Round 22 – Round 25

==== Losing games ====
Highest score in a losing game: 22 points

- Round 10 vs Cronulla-Sutherland Sharks
- Round 26 vs Wests Tigers

Lowest score in a losing game: 8 points

- Round 13 vs New Zealand Warriors

Greatest losing margin: 26 points

- Round 7 vs Canterbury-Bankstown Bulldogs

Greatest number of games lost consecutively: 3

- Round 10 – Round 13

== Feeder clubs ==
Melbourne continued their relationships with both the Cronulla-Sutherland Sharks and Easts Tigers to send any reserve players to play in their respective state cup competitions. Both teams would miss the finals in 2012.

2012 New South Wales Cup
Pos	Team	Pld	W	D	L	B	PF	PA	PD	Pts
10	Cronulla Sharks	24	12	0	12	2	541	717	-176	28

In the Queensland Cup, Easts Tigers coached by Troy McCarthy fell just short of making the finals. Needing a win and other results to go their way in the final round of the season, the Tigers thrashed the Central Queensland Capras 68–12, missing out on making the finals on points difference of just 20 points. The team had been a strong chance of making the finals through the season, but consecutive losses late in the season proved costly.

2012 Queensland Cup
Pos	Team	Pld	W	D	L	PF	PA	PD	Pts
6	Easts Tigers	22	13	0	9	621	496	125	26

== S. G. Ball Cup ==
Melbourne's junior representative team in the New South Wales Rugby League under-18s competition S. G. Ball Cup again missed the finals in their fourth season in the competition. Coached by club high performance manager Kim Williams, the team would win only two and draw one of their nine matches for the season, finishing in 13th place on the ladder out of the 18 teams competing.

== Awards ==
=== Trophy Cabinet ===
- 2012 Provan-Summons Trophy

=== Melbourne Storm Awards Night ===
Held at Melbourne Convention Centre on Friday 5 October.

- Melbourne Storm Player of the Year: Cameron Smith
- Melbourne Storm Rookie of the Year: Mahe Fonua
- Melbourne Storm Members' Player of Year: Cooper Cronk
- Most Improved: Sisa Waqa
- Best Forward: Ryan Hoffman
- Best Back: Cooper Cronk
- Best Try: Gareth Widdop vs Gold Coast Titans (Round 23)
- Darren Bell U20s Player of the Year: Young Tonumaipea
- U20s Best Back: Kirisome Auva'a
- U20s Best Forward: Karl Davies
- Greg Brentnall Young Achievers Award: Young Tonumaipea
- Mick Moore Club Person of the Year: Frank Ponissi
- Life Member Inductees: Cooper Cronk & Alex Corvo

=== Dally M Awards Night ===
On 4 August, the 2012 Dally M Awards were held.

- Dally M Halfback of the Year: Cooper Cronk
- Dally M Hooker of the Year: Cameron Smith

=== RLIF Awards Night ===
On 17 October, the RLIF held their annual award ceremony and presented a number of awards to Melbourne Storm personnel including naming Cameron Smith the 'International Rugby League Player of the Year'.

- RLIF International Player of the Year: Cameron Smith
- RLIF International Coach of the Year:Craig Bellamy
- RLIF Halfback of the Year: Cooper Cronk
- RLIF Hooker of the Year: Cameron Smith
- RLIF Fijian Player of the Year: Sisa Waqa

=== Additional Awards ===
- Clive Churchill Medal: Cooper Cronk
- Spirit of ANZAC Medal: Kevin Proctor
