= Tim Glasby =

Australian rugby league footballer

Personal information
- Full name: Timothy Glasby
- Born: 27 April 1989 (age 37) Townsville, Queensland, Australia

Playing information
- Height: 188 cm (6 ft 2 in)
- Weight: 106 kg (16 st 10 lb)
- Position: Prop, Lock
Club
| Years | Team | Pld | T | G | FG | P |
|---|---|---|---|---|---|---|
| 2013–18 | Melbourne Storm | 110 | 10 | 0 | 0 | 40 |
| 2019–20 | Newcastle Knights | 28 | 2 | 0 | 0 | 8 |
| | Total | 138 | 12 | 0 | 0 | 48 |
Representative
| Years | Team | Pld | T | G | FG | P |
| 2013 | Queensland Residents | 1 | 1 | 0 | 0 | 4 |
| 2017–19 | Queensland | 5 | 0 | 0 | 0 | 0 |

Tim Glasby (born 27 April 1989) is an Australian former professional rugby league footballer. He played for the Melbourne Storm, with whom he won the 2017 NRL Grand Final and Newcastle Knights in the National Rugby League (NRL). He also represented Queensland in State of Origin. His positions were lock and prop.

== Early life ==
Glasby was born in Townsville, Queensland, Australia, but grew up in Rockhampton, Queensland and was educated at North Rockhampton State High School.

He played junior rugby league for local clubs, North Rockhampton Knights and Rockhampton Brothers. He was then signed by the Penrith Panthers.

== Playing career ==
=== Early years ===
From 2008 to 2009, Glasby played for the Penrith Panthers' NYC team. He later joined the Central Queensland Capras in the Queensland Cup. In 2010, he won the Rookie of the Year award, while winning the Capras' Player of the Year three years in a row from 2010 to 2012. He captained the side in 2012. On 6 June 2012, he signed a 2-year contract with the Melbourne Storm starting in 2013.

=== 2013 ===
In round 16 of the 2013 NRL season, Glasby made his NRL debut for the Storm against the Wests Tigers. He went on to play one more NRL match for the Storm in his debut season.

=== 2014 ===
On 21 July, Glasby signed a two-year contract with North Queensland starting in 2015, however he was granted a release from the contract in October on compassionate grounds, re-signing with the Storm on a new two-year contract until the end of 2016. He played 13 NRL matches for the Storm in 2014, as he began to establish himself in the top side.

=== 2016 ===
In April, Glasby re-signed with the Melbourne club on a two-year contract until the end of 2018. Glasby was part of the Melbourne side which convincingly won the 2016 Minor Premiership but lost the grand final to Cronulla-Sutherland at ANZ Stadium.

=== 2017 ===
After losing Game I of the 2017 State of Origin series, defeated 28-4 by New South Wales, the Queensland Maroons omitted players Corey Oates, Justin O'Neill, Nate Myles, Sam Thaiday, Aidan Guerra and Jacob Lillyman all due to form, opening up a position on the interchange bench for Glasby to make his State of Origin debut in Game II. This led to controversy after Sydney newspaper The Daily Telegraph published an article with the headline "Why did Queensland select this NRL nobody?". The article received backlash, being called "disrespectful" and in "poor taste".

In October, Glasby played off the interchange bench for the Storm in their 2017 NRL Grand Final win over the North Queensland Cowboys.

=== 2018 ===
In May, Glasby signed a three-year contract with the Newcastle Knights starting in 2019. In the 2018 NRL season, Glasby played 24 games as Melbourne reached their third consecutive grand final but were defeated by the Sydney Roosters 21–6 at ANZ Stadium. This was Glasby's last game for Melbourne.

=== 2019 ===
Glasby played 21 games for Newcastle in the 2019 NRL season as the club finished a disappointing 11th on the table.

=== 2020 ===
After playing 7 games for Newcastle in the 2020 NRL season, Glasby was unable to continue playing after recovering from repeated concussions and ongoing symptoms. In September, he was medically retired due to the on-going concussion issues. He said, "When I was playing Queensland Cup there was nothing... you would get a knock and you might tell someone afterwards, or you might have a beer and get on with it... I had no issues for a long time then I got a knock to the head and it started getting worse. That’s just my situation. I’ve erred on the side of caution this time and I hope by doing that I’ll limit any damage that may come long term."

== Post career ==
In November 2020, it was announced that Glasby would be returning to the Melbourne Storm in 2021 as Recruitment Officer and Pathways Manager.

== Honours ==
Club

- 2016 Minor Premiership winners
- 2017 NRL Grand Final Winners
- 2017 Minor Premiership winners
- 2018 World Club Challenge Winners

== Statistics ==
| Year | Team | Games | Tries | Pts |
|---|---|---|---|---|
| 2013 | Melbourne Storm | 2 | 1 | 4 |
| 2014 | Melbourne Storm | 13 | 2 | 8 |
| 2015 | Melbourne Storm | 26 | 2 | 8 |
| 2016 | Melbourne Storm | 22 | 2 | 8 |
| 2017 | Melbourne Storm | 23 | 2 | 8 |
| 2018 | Melbourne Storm | 24 | 1 | 4 |
| 2019 | Newcastle Knights | 21 | 2 | 8 |
| 2020 | Newcastle Knights | 7 | | |
| | Totals | 138 | 12 | 48 |
