= Lagi Setu =

Samoa international rugby league footballer

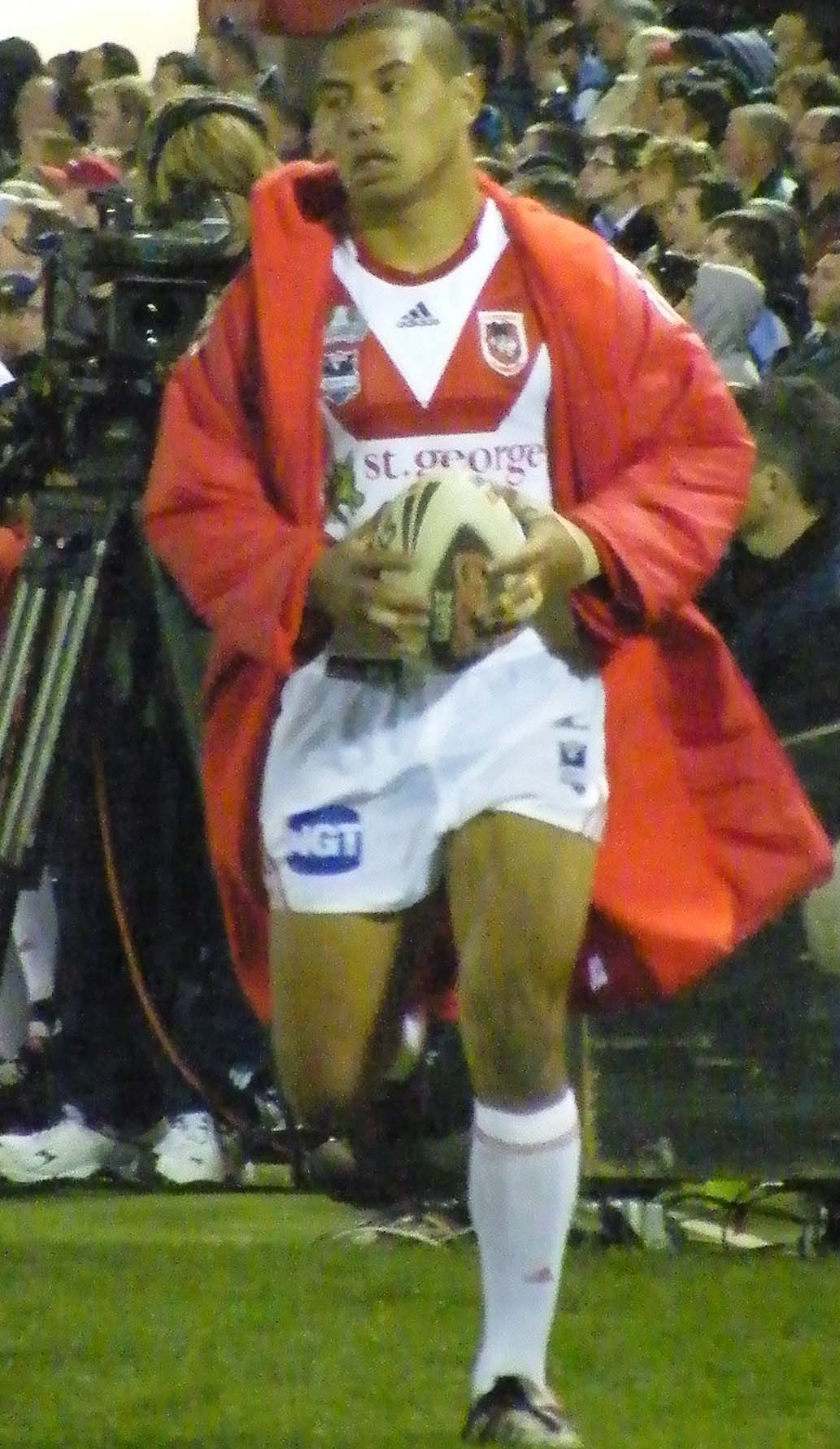
- Setu in 2008

Personal information
- Born: 25 February 1988 (age 38) Auckland, New Zealand
- Height: 187 cm (6 ft 2 in)
- Weight: 105 kg (16 st 7 lb)

Playing information

Rugby league
- Position: Second-row
Club
Years	Team	Pld	T	G	FG	P
2007–08	St. George Illawarra	31	1	0	0	4
2009–10	Brisbane Broncos	33	4	0	0	16
2013	Melbourne Storm	8	1	0	0	4
2015	Sydney Roosters	2	0	0	0	0
	Total	74	6	0	0	24
Representative
Years	Team	Pld	T	G	FG	P
2008	Samoa	2	0	0	0	0

Rugby union
Club
Years	Team	Pld	T	G	FG	P
2015–	Queensland Country	3	0	0	0	0
- Source: As of 4 March 2018

Lagi Setu (born 25 February 1988) is a Samoa international rugby league footballer. In rugby league he primarily plays second-row, prop or lock.

== Early life ==
Born in Auckland, New Zealand. Setus’ family moved to Ipswich, Queensland, where he was educated at Ipswich Grammar School.

He played his junior football at Ipswich Jets, also playing rugby union, representing Australian Schoolboys in 2005 primarily as a blindside flanker, pairing with the likes of [[Ben McCalman]] and [[David Pocock]] before being signed by the St. George Illawarra Dragons.

== Playing career ==
He played for the Dragons' Premier League reserve-grade team in 2006. In round 2 of the 2007 NRL season he made his NRL debut for St. George Illawarra against the Newcastle Knights. In 2008, Setu played twenty games for St. George's Toyota Cup team, scoring 1 try.

On 31 July 2008, Setu signed a contract with the Brisbane Broncos starting in 2009. Setu played 21 games for Brisbane in the 2009 NRL season as the club reached the preliminary final but were defeated 40-10 by Melbourne.

In 2010, Setu announced he would be leaving the Brisbane Broncos to serve a two-year mission for the Church of Jesus Christ of Latter-day Saints in Birmingham, England starting in 2011.

On 13 September 2012, Setu announced his return from his mission, signing a one-year contract with the Melbourne Storm starting in 2013. His first game was interchange for Storm's 2013 World Club Challenge win over Leeds.

He has signed with the Canberra Raiders for the 2014 NRL season on a two-year deal. Setu didn't make an appearance for the Raiders in the 2014 season.

On 6 November 2014, Setu signed a one-year deal with the Sydney Roosters for the 2015 NRL season.

== Representative career ==
In 2008, Setu was named in the Samoan training squad for the 2008 Rugby League World Cup. He made the final squad and played 2 games.

== Rugby Union ==
After the 2015 Rugby League season, Lagi returned to Rugby Union, signing with Queensland Country.
