= Jesse Bromwich =

New Zealand & Maori international rugby league footballer

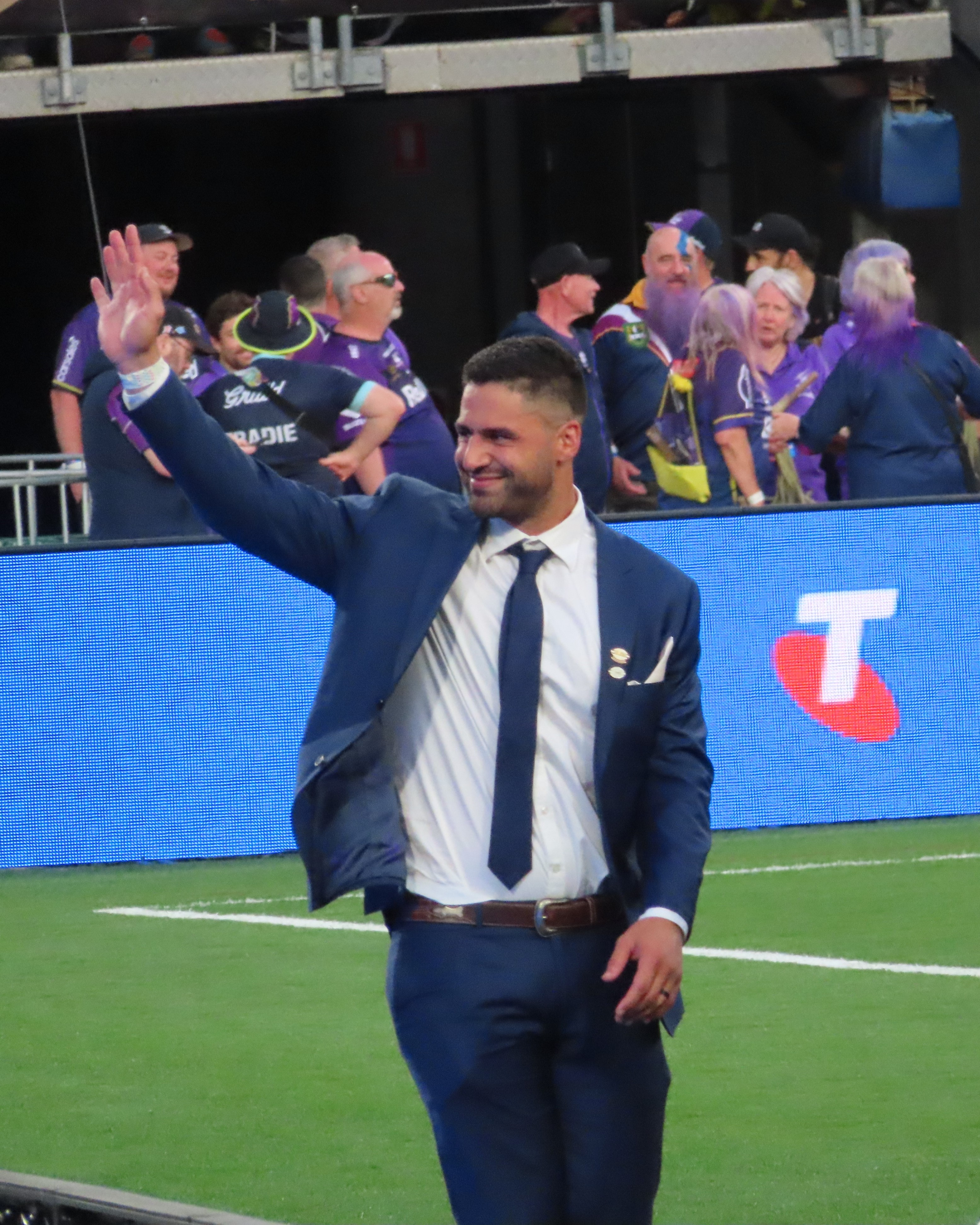

Personal information
- Born: 3 May 1989 (age 37) Auckland, New Zealand

Playing information
- Height: 194 cm (6 ft 4 in)
- Weight: 114 kg (17 st 13 lb)
- Position: Prop
Club
Years	Team	Pld	T	G	FG	P
2010–22	Melbourne Storm	295	32	0	0	128
2023–24	Dolphins	43	2	0	0	8
	Total	338	34	0	0	136
Representative
Years	Team	Pld	T	G	FG	P
2012–23	New Zealand	34	3	0	0	12
2015	NRL All Stars	1	0	0	0	0
2019–20	Māori All Stars	2	0	0	0	0
- Relatives: Kenny Bromwich (brother)

Jesse Bromwich (born 3 May 1989) is a New Zealand former professional rugby league footballer who last played as a prop for the Dolphins in the National Rugby League (NRL), who he also captained.

In 2021 and 2022, Bromwich co-captained the Melbourne Storm. He also played in their victorious 2012, 2017 and 2020 grand finals, and the 2010 and 2013 World Club Challenges. Bromwich played for New Zealand, the New Zealand Māori, and the NRL All Stars at representative level.

== Early life ==
Bromwich was born in Auckland, New Zealand, and is of Māori descent. He is the older brother of Kenny Bromwich who also played for both Melbourne Storm and the Dolphins.

He played junior rugby league for the Manurewa Marlins. All of his junior career was spent in Auckland, being an Auckland Sea lions NJC under 18s grand finalist and Auckland Rugby League under 18s grand finalist in 2006, playing for Auckland Metro under 18s in 2007 and Auckland Māori in both 2007 and 2008. In 2007 he played representative football for the New Zealand Māori under 18's side. He moved with his family to Australia in his late teens and played for the New South Wales country club Orange Hawks in 2008. His good form in the 2008 season was acknowledged when he became a New South Wales Country Rugby League Group 10 under 23's representative player.

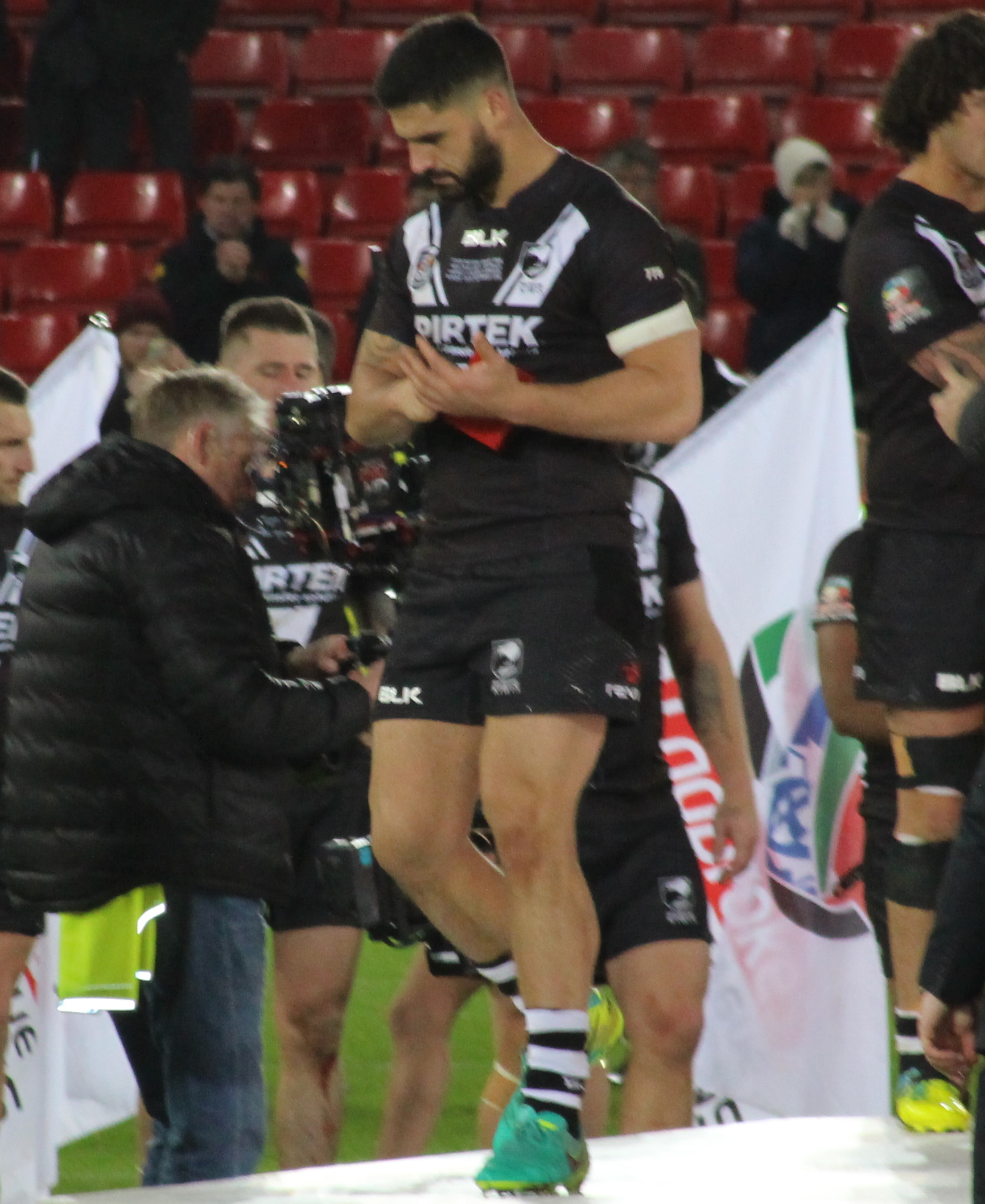
Jesse Bromwich representing New Zealand in 2016

== NRL career ==
=== Melbourne Storm (2009–2022) ===
Bromwich signed with Melbourne in 2009. In his first season with the club he was voted Toyota Cup NYC under 20s prop forward of the year and was named in the NYC team of the year after Melbourne won the competition. Bromwich played in the Storm's under-20s 24-22 grand final win over the West Tigers.

In 2009 he played in the New South Wales Cup with Melbourne's feeder club, the Central Coast Storm, making his debut against the Bankstown Bulls in round 10.

Bromwich was named in the Melbourne squad for the round 26 clash of the 2009 NRL season clash against the New Zealand Warriors in Auckland, however he was named 18th man and did not play.

Bromwich made his first-team debut against the Harlequins RL at the Twickenham Stoop in the World City Challenge in 2010. He made his full first-grade debut a week later against the Leeds Rhinos in the 2010 World Club Challenge. The Melbourne club won the trophy with an 18–10 win over the Super League champions at Elland Road, Leeds.

He made his NRL debut against the Cronulla-Sutherland Sharks in round 1 of the 2010 NRL season. He played in seven NRL matches during the season, and 21 matches in 2011, before signing an extension of his contract to play for Melbourne through the 2015 season. In 2012, he played in Melbourne's Grand Final victory over Canterbury-Bankstown. He played in Melbourne's 2013 World Club Challenge victory over Leeds, scoring a try.

For the 2013 Anzac Test, Bromwich was selected to play for New Zealand as a prop in their loss against Australia.

After captaining the Kiwis at the 2016 Rugby League Four Nations tournament, Bromwich was named the New Zealand Rugby League's Kiwis player of the year for 2016.

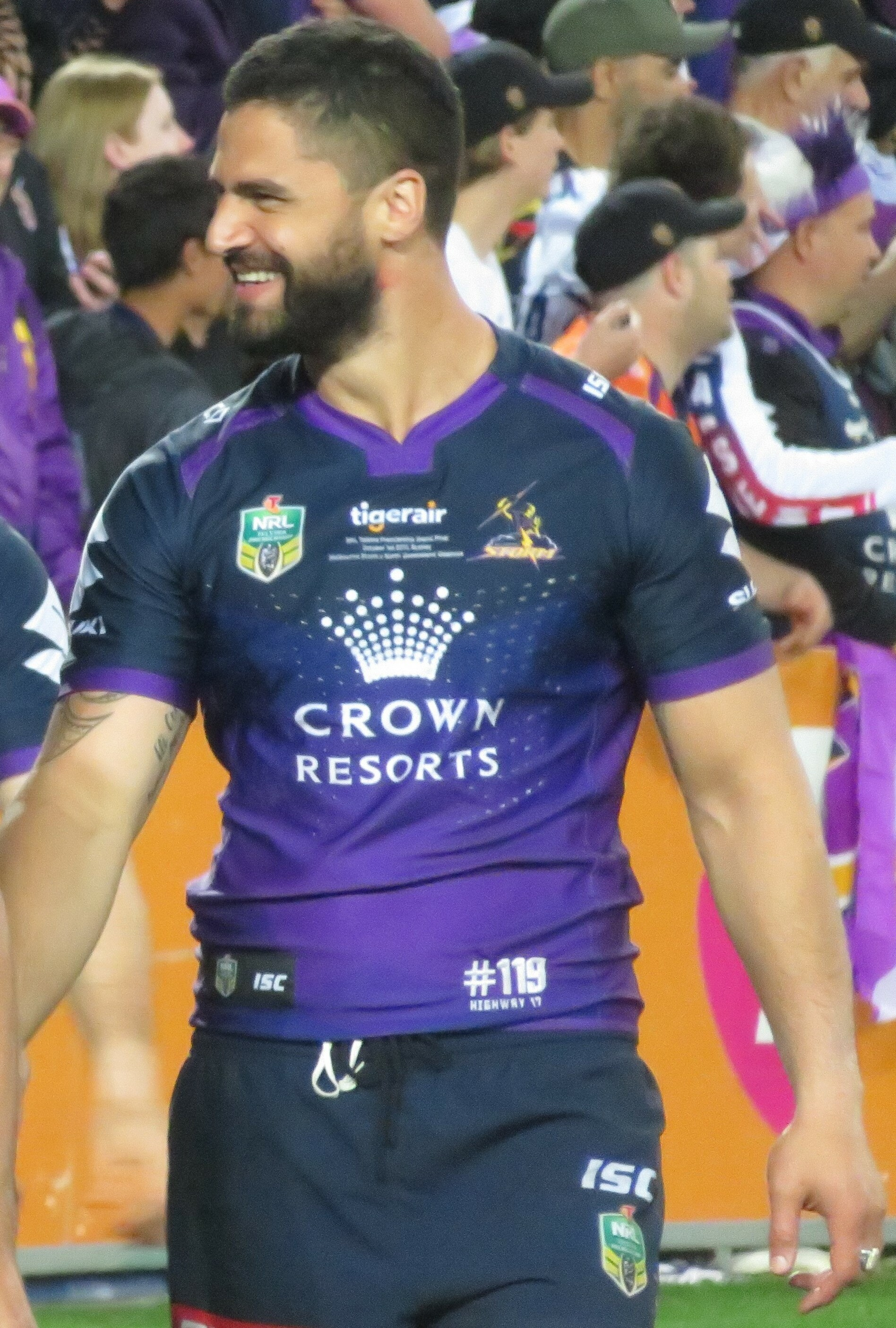
Bromwich in 2017

On 7 March 2017, Bromwich re-signed with the Melbourne club for a further three years to keep him at the club until the end of 2020.

On 7 May 2017, Bromwich stood down as captain of the Kiwis and was suspended for two games after a cocaine scandal following the Kiwis thrashing to Australia in the final ANZAC test. On 8 May 2017, Bromwich was removed from the Kiwis World Cup squad for drunk and disorderly behaviour after the Anzac test.

He played a part in the successful 2018 World Club Challenge team that played against Leeds at Melbourne. He was also part of the Melbourne team that played in the 2018 NRL Grand Final against the Sydney Roosters which ended in defeat. He played 27 games for Melbourne in the 2019 NRL season as the club finished as runaway Minor Premiers, however the club fell short of another grand final after capitulating against the Sydney Roosters in the preliminary final.

He played 19 games for Melbourne in the 2020 NRL season including the club's 2020 NRL Grand Final victory over Penrith. Bromwich played a total of 24 games for Melbourne in the 2021 NRL season as the club won 19 matches in a row and claimed the Minor Premiership. He played in two finals matches including the preliminary final where Melbourne suffered a shock 10-6 loss against eventual premiers Penrith. On 21 January 2022, Dolphins (NRL) announced via Twitter that Bromwich will be joining them in 2023.

Bromwich was restored as Kiwis captain for the 2022 mid-season test match against Tonga at Mt Smart Stadium.

=== Dolphins (2023–2024) ===
Bromwich signed with the Dolphins for the 2023 and 2024 seasons. In February 2023, he was named as the Dolphins inaugural team captain. However, he missed the Round 6 match due to a throat infection. Otherwise, Bromwich played his 300th NRL game in Round 5.

In Round 9, Bromwich scored a try in the Dolphins 30-31 loss to the Canberra Raiders at McDonalds Park, Wagga Wagga. Due to a hamstring injury, he was ruled out of the round 10 match. Nevertheless, he ended up playing twenty-one games for the Dolphins in 2023. On 3 June 2024, it was announced that Bromwich would be ruled out for an indefinite period with a pectoral injury which he suffered during the clubs golden point extra-time loss against Canberra in round 13 of the 2024 NRL season. However, he returned in round 16. Bromwich retired from playing at the end of the season.

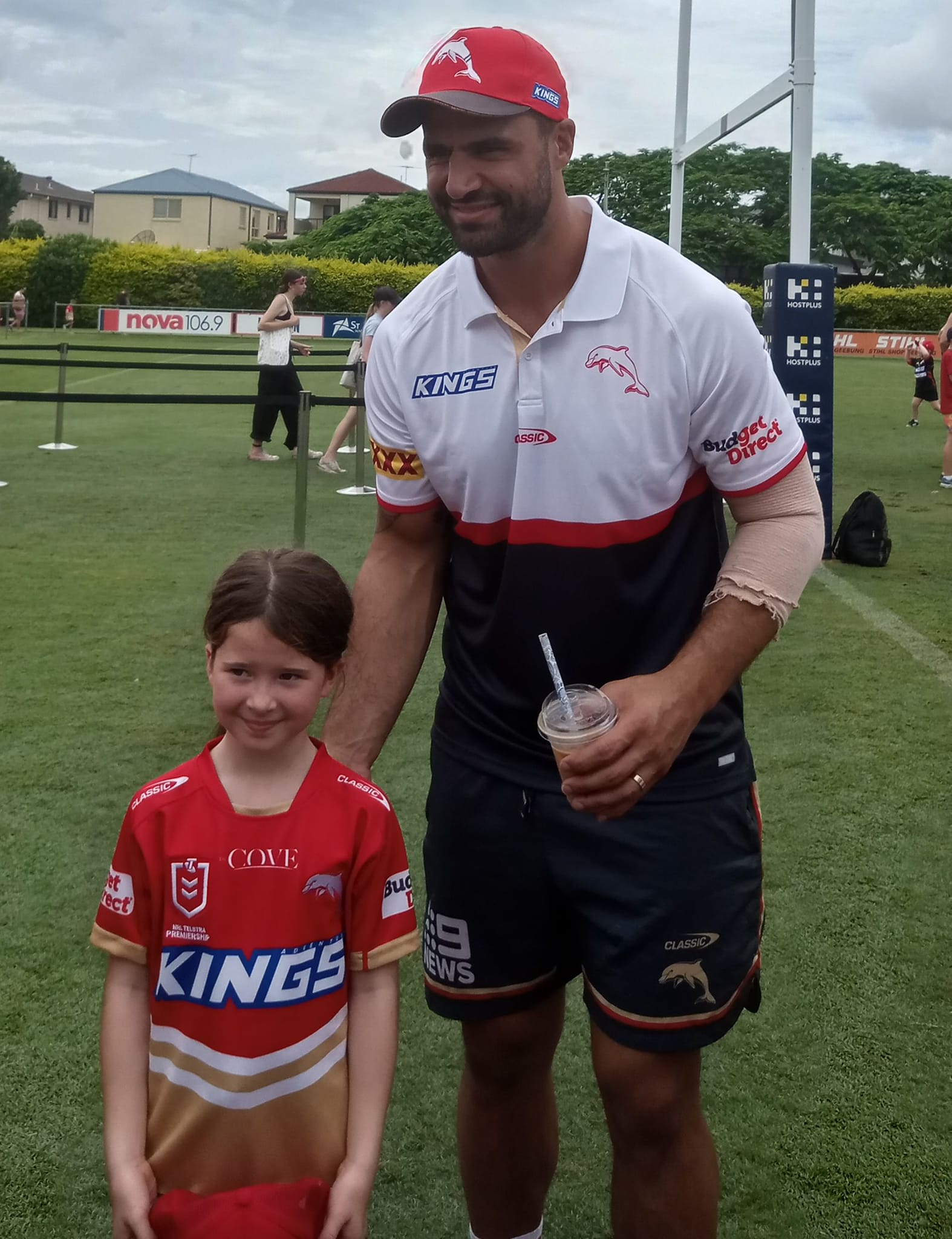
Bromwich and fan

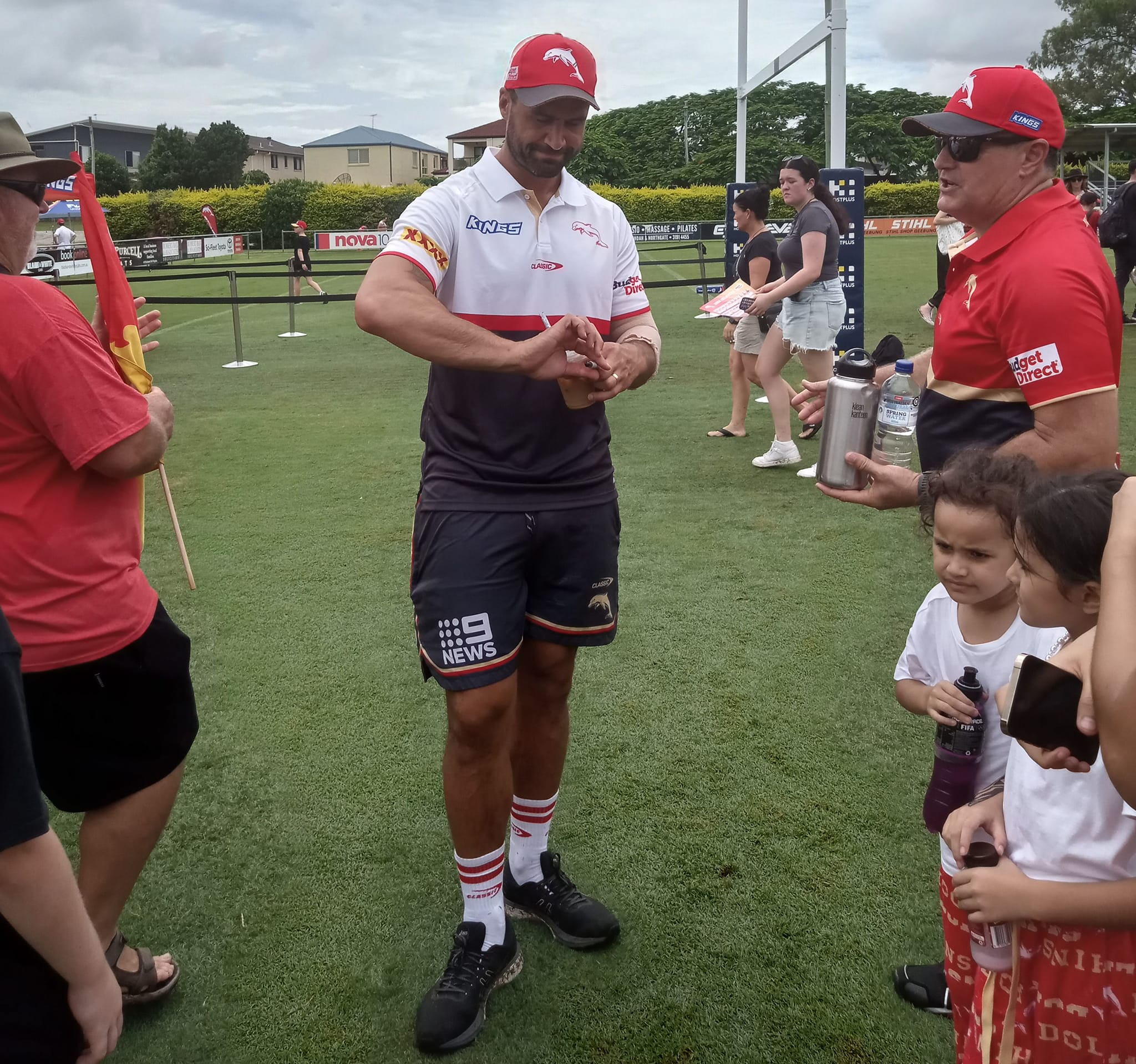
Bromwich with fans

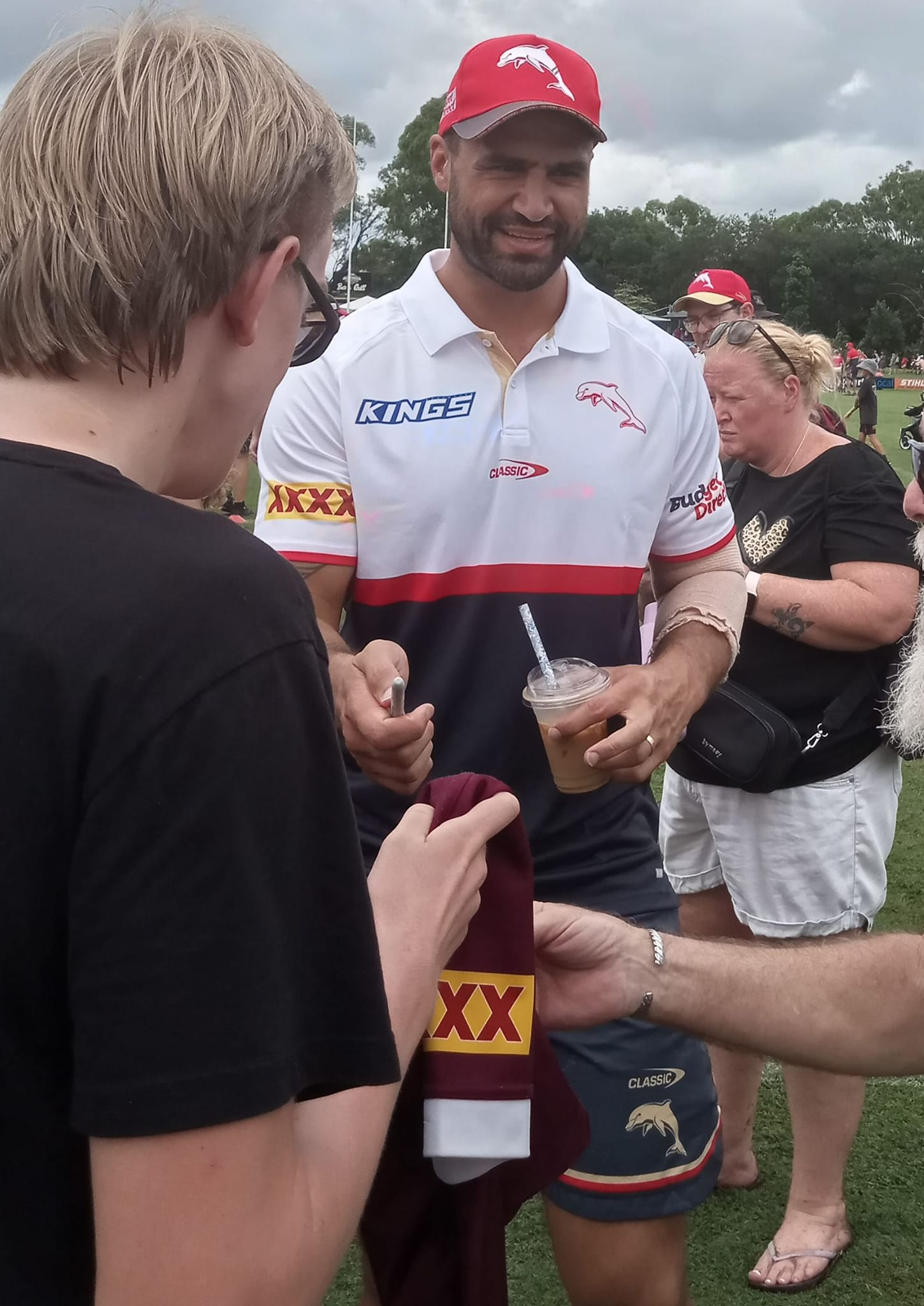
Bromwich with fans

== Honours ==
Individual

- Dally M

Prop of the Year: 2016

- Melbourne Storm

NSW Cup Player of the Year: 2010
Rookie of the Year: 2011
Player of the Year: 2014, 2015, 2016
Forward of the Year: 2013, 2017
Life Member: 2018
Co-captain: 2021–2022

- Dolphins (NRL)

Inaugural Captain: 2023

Melbourne Storm

- 2012 NRL Grand Final Premiers
- 2013 World Club Challenge Winners
- 2016 NRL Grand Final Runner-up
- 2017 NRL Grand Final Premiers
- 2018 World Club Challenge Winners
- 2020 NRL Grand Final Premiers

== Statistics ==
Year	Team	Games	Tries	Pts
2010	Melbourne Storm	7		
2011	Melbourne Storm	22	4	16
2012	Melbourne Storm	27	2	8
2013	Melbourne Storm	26	6	24
2014	Melbourne Storm	24	2	8
2015	Melbourne Storm	26	3	12
2016	Melbourne Storm	27	5	20
2017	Melbourne Storm	23	1	4
2018	Melbourne Storm	20		
2019	Melbourne Storm	27	5	20
2020	Melbourne Storm	19	2	8
2021	Melbourne Storm	24	1	4
2022	Melbourne Storm	23	1	4
2023	Dolphins	21	1	4
2024	Dolphins	22	1	4
	Totals	338	34	136
