= Ryan Hinchcliffe =

Australian rugby league footballer and coach

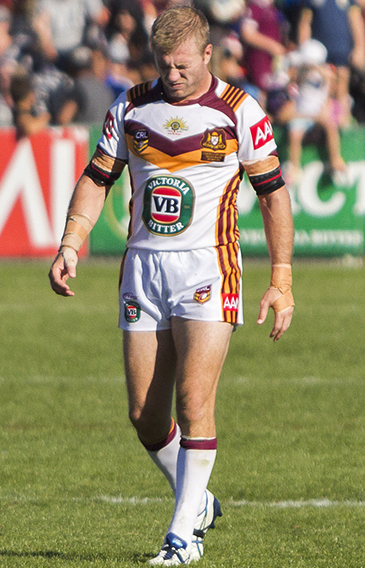

Personal information
- Born: 7 October 1984 (age 40); Temora, New South Wales, Australia

Playing information
- Height: 182 cm (6 ft 0 in)
- Weight: 89 kg (14 st 0 lb)
- Position: Lock, Hooker
Club
Years	Team	Pld	T	G	FG	P
2007–08	Canberra Raiders	21	3	0	0	12
2009–15	Melbourne Storm	177	19	0	0	76
2016–18	Huddersfield Giants	92	12	0	0	48
	Total	290	34	0	0	136
Representative
Years	Team	Pld	T	G	FG	P
2011–15	NSW Country	3	1	0	0	4

Ryan Hinchcliffe (born 7 October 1984) is an Australian former professional rugby league footballer who last played for the Huddersfield Giants in the Super League, as a lock and hooker, and previously played for the Melbourne Storm in the National Rugby League (NRL).

== Early life ==
Hinchcliffe was born in Temora, New South Wales, Australia. He was educated at Temora High School and played junior rugby league for Temora Dragons.

== Playing career ==
Hinchcliffe, a Temora Dragons junior, began his NRL career at Parramatta, although he previously played for the Canberra Raiders before moving to Melbourne, with whom he won the 2009 NRL Premiership. This premiership was later stripped in 2010 due to the club's multiple and deliberate breaches of the salary cap between 2006 and 2010.

Hinchcliffe was a hooker and could also play in the second row. He joined the Melbourne Storm from the Canberra Raiders for the 2009 NRL season. In Melbourne his impressive form resulted in reshuffles with Cameron Smith moving to five-eighth when lacking halves.

Hinchcliffe won the Storm's Player of the Year Award in 2010.

In 2012, he played in their premiership victory over Canterbury-Bankstown. Five months later, he played in their 2013 World Club Challenge win over Leeds.

In 2011 Hinchcliffe made his representative début for NSW Country and was again selected for the side in 2012.

On 22 June 2015, Hinchcliffe signed a 3-year contract with Super League team Huddersfield Giants starting in 2016.

On 4 September 2018, Hinchcliffe announced that he would be retiring at the end of the season.

== Coaching career ==
Hinchcliffe returned to Melbourne following his retirement as a player, taking up a role as a development coach at Melbourne Storm. He was a member of the coaching staff when Storm won the 2020 NRL Grand Final.

On 18 July 2025, Hinchcliffe was named as Samoa's assistant coach for the 2025 Pacific Championships.

== Statistics ==
Year	Team	Games	Tries	Pts
2007	Canberra Raiders	7	1	4
2008	Canberra Raiders	14	2	8
2009	Melbourne Storm	26	2	8
2010	Melbourne Storm	23	4	16
2011	Melbourne Storm	25	4	16
2012	Melbourne Storm	27	4	16
2013	Melbourne Storm	23	3	12
2014	Melbourne Storm	25	2	8
2015	Melbourne Storm	26		
2016	Huddersfield Giants	31	2	8
2017	Huddersfield Giants	30	6	24
2018	Huddersfield Giants	31	4	16
	Totals	290	34	136

source;
