= Bryan Norrie =

Australian rugby league footballer

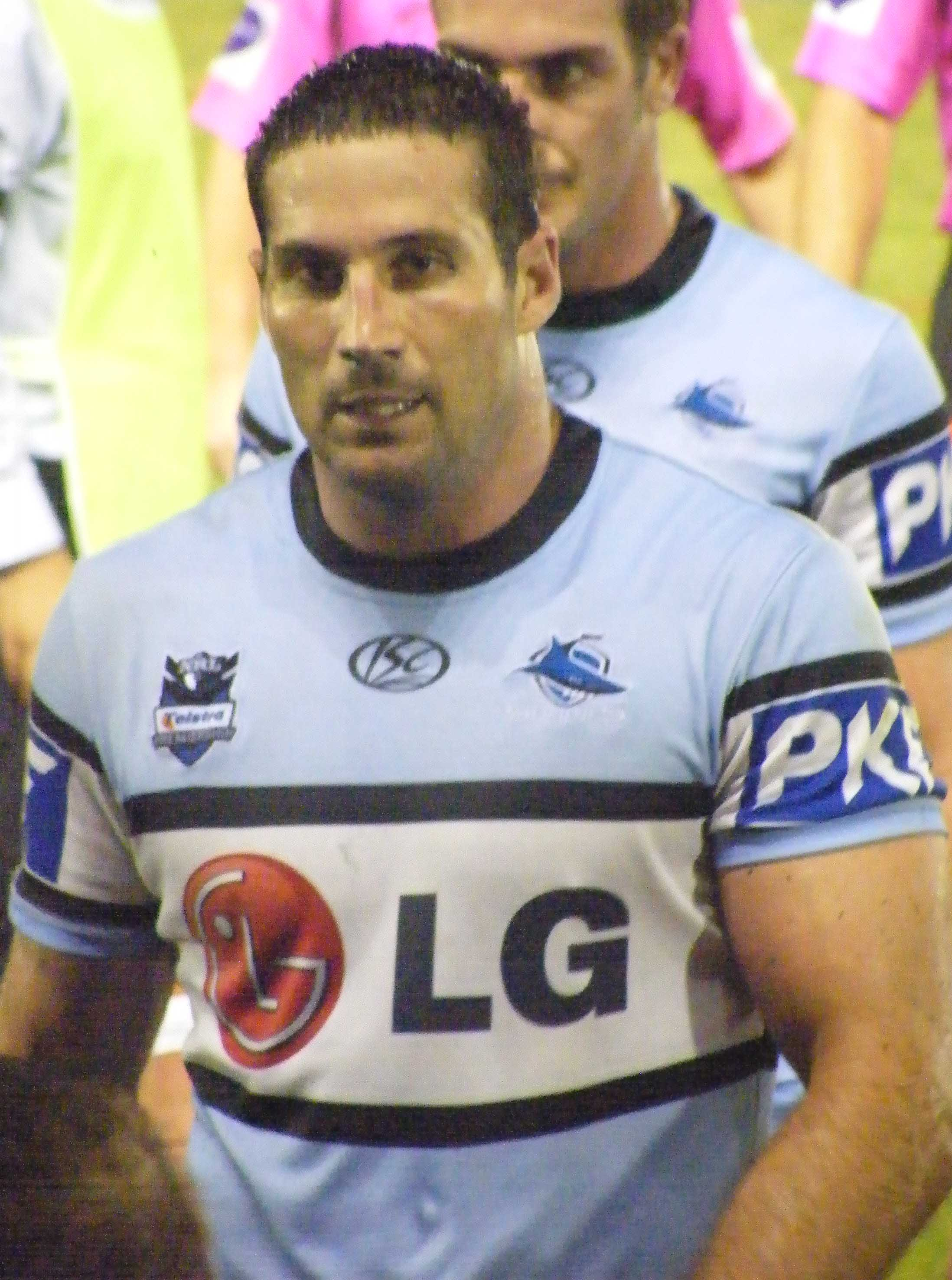
- Norrie while playing for the Sharks in 2009

Personal information
- Born: 14 October 1983 (age 43) Forbes, New South Wales, Australia

Playing information
- Height: 192 cm (6 ft 4 in)
- Weight: 113 kg (17 st 11 lb)
- Position: Prop, Second-row
Club
Years	Team	Pld	T	G	FG	P
2004–05	St. George Illawarra	7	0	0	0	0
2006–07	Penrith Panthers	28	0	0	0	0
2008–09	Cronulla Sharks	25	0	0	0	0
2010–14	Melbourne Storm	120	8	0	0	32
	Total	180	8	0	0	32

Bryan Norrie (born 14 October 1983) is an Australian former professional rugby league footballer who played in the 2000s and 2010s. He played for National Rugby League clubs the Melbourne Storm, Cronulla-Sutherland Sharks, St George Illawarra Dragons and Penrith Panthers. His usual position was prop.

== Early life ==
Born in Forbes, New South Wales. Norrie was educated at Eugowra Public School, then Yanco Agricultural High School, and represented the 2001 Australian Schoolboys in three test matches against Great Britain.

Norrie also represented his school in the Buckley Shield, Riverina Cup, Nutrigrain Cup, and University Shield. In 2000 and 2001 he was selected for Open boys Riverina and Southern teams. In 2001 Norrie was selected in the state schoolboys side.

== Professional playing career ==
Norrie made his NRL debut for the St George Illawarra Dragons in 2004. The Penrith Panthers contracted Norrie for 2 years between 2006 and 2007, prior to his 2-year tenure with the Cronulla-Sutherland Sharks in 2008-09.

Melbourne Storm signed Norrie in early 2010 and he later became a member of the Storm leadership group. He played in Storm's 2012 NRL Grand Final victory against the Canterbury-Bankstown Bulldogs and their 2013 World Club Challenge victory over Leeds.

On 10 October 2014, Norrie announced his retirement from rugby league after receiving medical advice as a result of a neck injury.

== Later years ==
Norrie became an Australian Apprenticeships Ambassador for the Australian Government.

After retiring from the NRL, Norrie took up a role at the Cronulla-Sutherland Sharks as part of the teams welfare and education department. In 2016 he joined the NRL as a match review officer.

== Statistics ==
Year	Team	Games	Tries	Pts
2004	St. George Illawarra Dragons	3		
2005	St. George Illawarra Dragons	4		
2006	Penrith Panthers	16		
2007	Penrith Panthers	12		
2008	Cronulla-Sutherland Sharks	14		
2009	Cronulla-Sutherland Sharks	11		
2010	Melbourne Storm	21	2	8
2011	Melbourne Storm	24	2	8
2012	Melbourne Storm	25	2	8
2013	Melbourne Storm	25	1	4
2014	Melbourne Storm	25	1	4
	Totals	180	8	32
