= 2010 Melbourne Storm season =

- NRL Rank: 16th (wooden spoon)
- 2010 record: Wins: 14; draws: 0; losses: 10
- Points scored: For: 489; against: 363

Team information
- CEO: Brian Waldron; Matt Hanson; Frank Stanton (acting); Ron Gauci
- Coach: Craig Bellamy
- Captain: Cameron Smith (20 Games) Cooper Cronk (3 Games) Adam Blair (1 Game)
- Stadium: AAMI Park – 30,050 (9 Games); Etihad Stadium - 53,500 (3 Games)
- Avg. attendance: 14,670
- High attendance: 25,480 (Round 4) (Note: Home games only)

Top scorers
- Tries: Greg Inglis (11)
- Goals: Cameron Smith (54)
- Points: Cameron Smith (116)
← 2009	List of seasons	2011 →

The 2010 Melbourne Storm season was the 13th in the club's history and competed in the NRL's 2010 Telstra Premiership. After winning the first four games of the season, Storm's season would hit a significant challenge after Round 6 when the NRL penalised the club for salary cap breaches with the team unable to play for points for the remainder of the season. These revelations also saw them stripped of the 2007 and 2009 Premierships and the 2006, 2007 and 2008 minor premiership titles.

Craig Bellamy and the players maintained an incredible focus to win 14 games for the year, the same number they achieved the previous season. That would have been enough to see them finish in fifth spot on the ladder. This was the first season in which the Storm missed the finals in the Bellamy era, the other being 2026.

Greg Inglis scored 11 tries to finish as the team's leading try scorer in his final year at Storm. Other notable players to leave included Brett White, Ryan Hoffman, Brett Finch, Jeff Lima and Aiden Tolman. However, there were several highlights during the season with youngsters Jesse Bromwich, Matthew Duffie, Luke Kelly, Rory Kostjasyn, Justin O’Neill and Gareth Widdop all bursting on the scene.

Storm also played their first ever game at AAMI Park in Round 9. Ryan Hinchcliffe was named Storm's player of the year while Ron Gauci was installed as Storm CEO midway through the difficult season and set about rebuilding the Club over the next several seasons. Craig Bellamy continues to be highly regarded for the way he led the Club throughout 2010 and had this to say when summing up the season.

"When we found out it was obviously devastating and the year has been a drawn-out and difficult one ever since. But we stayed competitive, we unearthed some good kids and we conducted ourselves with dignity. For that I’m proud of the boys. It’s sad to see guys go especially given the massive contribution they have had to this club". - Craig Bellamy

== Season summary ==
- 11 January – Matt Hanson is appointed club CEO, replacing Brian Waldron who had been in the role since 2005.
- 21 February – Melbourne begin their UK Tour with a victory over Harlequins RL at The Stoop, winning 34-10 with Dane Nielsen scoring a double.
- World Club Challenge – Melbourne defeat Leeds Rhinos 18-10 in the 2010 World Club Challenge held at Elland Road, the club's second triumph in the fixture. Played in torrential rain, the scores were locked at 4-all at half time, with no tries scored. Storm captain Cameron Smith who started the match at halfback, was announced as player of the match.
- Round 1 – Luke MacDougall scores a try in his club debut, his first NRL game since June 2007, as Melbourne start the season with a 14-10 win over Cronulla. It is the club's seventh straight Round 1 victory under Craig Bellamy.
- Round 2 – Behind 14-0 after 22 minutes, Melbourne come back to defeat Newcastle Knights 20-14.
- Round 3 – Returning from a hip injury, Cooper Cronk made an instant impact from the bench setting up a try and pulling off a 40-20 kick to help Melbourne to a 16-10 win over Penrith Panthers in Greg Inglis's 100th NRL game.
- March 27 – Allegations of a salary cap breach are levelled at the club as Cameron Smith takes up a promotional and commentary contract with Fox Sports, speculation about the legality of the deal lingering with both the club and Fox Sports owned by News Limited.
- Round 4 – In the club's first game of the season held in Victoria, Melbourne extended their undefeated start to the season with a 17-4 win over St George Illawarra Dragons, in front of a crowd of 25,480 a regular season record for games played in Victoria. Played on Good Friday, the club would raise $50,000 towards the Good Friday Appeal. After four rounds of the 2010 NRL season Melbourne would sit on top of the ladder as the only undefeated team.
- Round 5 – A handful of controversial refereeing decisions sees Gold Coast Titans hand Melbourne their first defeat of the season, coming from 16-4 down to win 20-16. Anthony Quinn's hat trick of tries not enough to secure victory.
- 12 April – Greg Inglis escapes conviction on assault charges following an incident with his girlfriend Sally Robinson in August 2009. Inglis was ordered to complete a diversion order after accepting responsibility for his actions. Inglis was stood down for a short period at the time of the incident in 2009.
- Round 6 – Down 16-0 after only 16 minutes in Monday night football, Melbourne fall short 18-16 against Manly to lose their second successive game.
- 22 April – See salary cap scandal section.
- Round 7 – Just three days after the salary cap scandal news broke and the punishments announced, Melbourne players high on passion and emotion thrash the New Zealand Warriors 40-6 at Etihad Stadium. Rookie Matt Duffie scores two tries on his NRL debut, with Cameron Smith quoted "we had a lot to get through this week, sitting at home not knowing how we are going to feel tonight... I can say it's the proudest moment of all our careers."
- Round 9 – In the first NRL game at the new $267m AAMI Park venue, Storm lose 36-14 despite Anthony Quinn scoring the first try at the ground. Playing without Cameron Smith, Melbourne looked flat as former Storm player Israel Folau scored two tries.
- 13 May – An injury suffered by Anthony Quinn in the match against Brisbane is found to be more serious, with the winger to be sidelined for over a month after surgery.
- Round 10 – Amidst chaotic scenes in the crowd as angry Canberra Raiders fans waved $10 and $20 notes over the fence at Melbourne players, the Storm beat the original 1990s salary cap cheating club Canberra 17-6 on the back of a hat trick of tries to Greg Inglis.
- 18 May – Aiden Tolman becomes the first player to be forced out of the club after the salary cap punishments, signing a 3-year contract with Canterbury from 2011.
- 27 May – Melbourne players secure a deal with club sponsors who agree to donate money to different charities every week. The program is launched as "Points with a Purpose" with each game having a different charity as beneficiary of a donation for each point scored by the team.
- Round 12 – Melbourne win their first game at AAMI Park, defeating 2002 salary cap cheating club Canterbury 23-12 after leading 23-0 at half time.
- 4 June – The Thunderbolts snap an 8-game winless streak in the 2010 Toyota Cup season, with the reigning premiers defeating Parramatta.
- Round 13 – In a spiteful rematch of the 2009 NRL Grand Final, future salary cap cheating club Parramatta defeat Melbourne 24-10 amidst tense scenes. Billy Slater was sin binned after retaliating to a Jarryd Hayne head-butt.
- 12 June – Ryan Tandy is given an immediate release by the club, with the forward immediately joining Canterbury for the remainder of the season.
- Round 14 – Missing a bunch of Queensland Origin players, and captained for the first and only time by Adam Blair, Melbourne are beaten by Sydney Roosters 38-6 to score the visitors first victory in Melbourne since 2004.
- Round 15 – A hat-trick to Justin O'Neill and doubles to Matt Duffie and Billy Slater help Melbourne raise plenty of money for charity in a 58-12 thrashing of North Queensland Cowboys.
- Round 16 – South Sydney Rabbitohs score their first victory over Melbourne since 2004, winning a close 16-14 contest in Perth.
- Round 18 – In the club's first game at the Adelaide Oval, and first game in South Australia since 2006, Melbourne go down 20-18 to Canterbury.
- 14 July – Big-name Melbourne players Cameron Smith, Billy Slater, Greg Inglis and Cooper Cronk are reported to have approached Storm officials offering to take pay cuts to help the club retain them and field a team under the National Rugby League salary cap in 2011.
- 15 July – The findings of the News Limited commissioned report by Deloitte into the salary cap breach are released by News Limited chairman and CEO John Hartigan. In anticipation of the release of the report, News Limited sacks the club's independent board members, with acting-CEO Frank Stanton in charge of the club with the board now consisting of only News Limited executives. See salary cap scandal section.
- Round 19 – Melbourne suffer their third-straight defeat, the longest streak under Craig Bellamy, losing the Michael Moore Trophy to the Warriors 13-6 in Auckland.
- 19 July – Ryan Hoffman, Jeff Lima, and Brett Finch are all announced as leaving Melbourne at the end of the season, with all three players joining Wigan Warriors.
- 21 July – Ron Gauci is appointed as new club CEO, replacing acting-CEO Frank Stanton.
- Round 20 – Storm snap their losing streak, ending a mid-season slump with a 18-10 win over Penrith Panthers.
- 10 August – Greg Inglis (Brisbane) and Brett White (Canberra) are confirmed as the latest departures from the club as Melbourne submit their contract lists to the NRL for 2011. Inglis would later end up at South Sydney after his release from his Storm contract caused issues, with Brisbane eventually withdrawing their contract offer after Inglis failed to report to preseason training in November 2010.
- Round 23 – Two tries to Ryan Hinchcliffe helped Melbourne to a 18-16 win over South Sydney, extending the Rabbitohs' winless streak in Victoria.
- 2 September – NRL CEO David Gallop belatedly visits Melbourne to speak to the Storm players for the first time since handing down the salary cap breach punishments. With the meeting described as "respectful."
- Round 26 – For its final match of the season, the club sold single tickets for $1 as a thank-you gesture to the club's supporters after what had been a difficult season. Bidding farewell to a bunch of departing players, Melbourne score a comfortable 34-4 victory over Newcastle. Departing players Greg Inglis (2 tries), Ryan Hoffman, Brett White, and Aiden Tolman all scoring tries, with Jeff Lima scoring the first goal of his career. Melbourne's final 14-10 win-loss record for the season would have seen them finish fifth on the NRL ladder if they were able to accrue points.
- 6 October – Melbourne Storm assistant coach Stephen Kearney is appointed head coach of the Parramatta Eels.
- 18 October – NRL Judiciary chairman Greg Woods and panel members Royce Ayliffe and Darrell Williams settle their defamation action against Craig Bellamy and former Storm CEO Brian Waldron. The case came from comments made after the 2008 suspension of Cameron Smith during the finals. It is reported that Bellamy and Waldron would pay a total of $105,000 and meet legal costs in excess of $100,000.
- 30 November – The club announces the end of their reserve grade program in the NSW Cup, announcing new feeder club agreements. Reserve players will be sent to either Easts Tigers to play in the Queensland Cup, or to play in NSW Cup in a combined side with Cronulla-Sutherland Sharks.

=== Salary cap scandal ===
On 22 April 2010, the Melbourne Storm were stripped of their titles of 2007 and 2009 premierships and their 2006, 2007 and 2008 minor premierships following an alleged insider tip-off to the NRL auditing body that the club had not been complying with the NRL salary cap. The club had a long-term system of keeping two sets of books, one set displaying players incomes' complying with the NRL salary cap and another hidden set in a separate room disclosing the true player payments. Following evidence of salary cap breaches, Melbourne were also fined a record $1,689,000, deducted all eight premiership points received in the season and barred from receiving any further premiership points (including those for the two byes) for the rest of the season, guaranteeing them zero points and the wooden spoon for 2010.

On 24 April coach Craig Bellamy publicly announced that he vowed to rebuild the shattered club, and welcomed the NRL's investigation into the salary cap rorting before a training session with the team which was watched by thousands of cheering supporters.

Players were still allowed to play Test and/or State of Origin matches and for some of those players it did not affect Queensland's bid for a fifth straight Origin series victory. Later in the season the Storm were also stripped of the 2010 World Club Challenge title, and Cameron Smith was stripped of his Man of the Match award as well. The team's under-20s team was not affected.

=== Milestone games ===
Round	Player	Milestone
Round 1	Luke MacDougall	Storm debut
Round 1	Jesse Bromwich	NRL debut
Round 1	Rory Kostjasyn	NRL debut
Round 2	Todd Lowrie	Storm debut 100th NRL game
Round 3	Greg Inglis	100th game
Round 3	Ryan Hinchcliffe	50th NRL game
Round 3	Bryan Norrie	Storm debut
Round 7	Matthew Duffie	NRL debut
Round 7	Gareth Widdop	NRL debut
Round 12	Chase Stanley	Storm debut
Round 13	Cooper Cronk	150th game
Round 14	Justin O'Neill	NRL debut
Round 15	Brett Finch	250th NRL game
Round 21	Aiden Tolman	50th game
Round 21	Sione Kite	Storm debut
Round 24	Sika Manu	50th game
Round 26	Cameron Smith	1000 points

=== Attendance averages ===
	Total	Matches	Average
Home	176,041	12	14,670
Away	168,109	12	14,009
All	344,150	24	14,340

=== Jerseys ===
Apparel supplier KooGa redesigned the home and clash jerseys for the 2010 season. The home jersey emphasised the club's purple colour, with the back of the jersey mostly purple for the first time. Two white lightning bolts featured on the front of the jersey, with navy blue side panels and shoulders. The home jersey was worn with navy blue shorts and socks.

The club's clash jersey was a similar to the home jersey but in white, with purple-coloured lightning bolts. The clash jersey was worn with purple shorts and white socks.

A one-off design was worn in the 2010 World Club Challenge match against Leeds Rhinos, with silver lightning bolts on a gradient-faded purple design on the front and back of the jersey.

Following the exposure of the salary cap breaches, major sponsors ME Bank and Hostplus removed their corporate logos from the jersey, with other sponsors Jayco Australia and Suzuki hastily taking their places from round 7 onward.

== Fixtures ==
=== Pre Season ===
Date	Rd	Opponent	Venue	Result	Mel.	Opp.	Tries	Goals	Field goals	Ref
13 February	Trial	Brisbane Broncos	Browne Park, Rockhampton	Lost	12	24	L MacDougall, A Killingbeck	G Widdop 2/2		
20 February	Trial	Newcastle Knights	St John Oval, Charlestown	Lost	10	66	B Leslie, F Makimare	D O'Regan 1/2		
21 February	UK Tour	Harlequins RL	The Stoop, London, England	Won	34	10	D Nielsen (2), A Quinn, K Proctor, H Cahill, R Kostjasyn	G Widdop 5/6		

2010 World Club Challenge

28 February 2010
18:30 GMT (UTC+0)

Leeds Rhinos	10 – 18	Melbourne Storm
Tries: 1 McGuire 48'; Goals: 3/3; Sinfield pen 4' (1/1); Burrow pen 33', 49' (2/2)	1st: 4 – 4; 2nd: 6 – 14; Report	Tries: 2 MacDougall 51'; Quinn 78'; Goals: 5/5; Smith pen 7', pen 38', 52', pen 60', 79'

Elland Road, Leeds
Attendance: 27,697
Referee: Richard Silverwood (England)
Player of the Match: Cameron Smith
(Note: Later stripped due to Melbourne Storm's breach of the NRL's salary cap)

=== Regular season ===
==== Result by round ====
Round	1	2	3	4	5	6	7	8	9	10	11	12	13	14	15	16	17	18	19	20	21	22	23	24	25	26
Ground	A	A	A	H	A	H	H	A	H	A	–	H	A	H	H	A	–	A	A	H	H	A	H	H	A	H
Result	W	W	W	W	L	L	W	W	L	W	B	W	L	L	W	L	B	L	L	W	W	L	W	W	L	W
Position	6	3	3	1	2	4	16	16	16	16	16	16	16	16	16	16	16	16	16	16	16	16	16	16	16	16
Points	2	4	6	8	8	8	0	0	0	0	0	0	0	0	0	0	0	0	0	0	0	0	0	0	0	0

Source: Rugby League Tables
A = Away; H = Home; N = Neutral; B = Bye; W = Win; D = Draw; L = Loss

==== Matches ====
- (g.p.) – Golden Point extra time
- (pen) – Penalty try

Date	Rd	Opponent	Venue	Result	Mel.	Opp.	Tries	Goals	Field goals	Ref
13 March	1	Cronulla-Sutherland Sharks	Toyota Stadium, Sydney	Won	14	10	G Inglis, L MacDougall	C Smith 3/3		
20 March	2	Newcastle Knights	Energy Australia Stadium, Newcastle	Won	20	14	L MacDougall, A Quinn, D Nielsen	C Smith 4/5		
27 March	3	Penrith Panthers	CUA Stadium, Sydney	Won	16	10	B Finch, B Slater, L MacDougall	C Smith 2/3		
2 April	4	St George Illawarra Dragons	Etihad Stadium, Melbourne	Won	17	4	D Nielsen, A Quinn, B Slater	C Smith 2/5	C Cronk	
9 April	5	Gold Coast Titans	Skilled Park, Gold Coast	Lost	16	20	A Quinn (3)	C Smith 2/3		
19 April	6	Manly Warringah Sea Eagles	Etihad Stadium, Melbourne	Lost	16	18	C Cronk (2), B Norrie	C Smith 2/3		
25 April	7	New Zealand Warriors	Etihad Stadium, Melbourne	Won	40	6	M Duffie (2), C Smith, A Blair, R Tandy, W Isa, B Slater	C Smith 6/7		
1 May	8	North Queensland Cowboys	Dairy Farmers Stadium, Townsville	Won	34	6	B Norrie, M Duffie, G Inglis, B Finch, D Nielsen, A Quinn, J Lima	C Smith 3/6, G Inglis 0/1		
9 May	9	Brisbane Broncos	AAMI Park, Melbourne	Lost	14	36	M Duffie (2), A Quinn	G Inglis 1/2, C Cronk 0/1		
15 May	10	Canberra Raiders	Canberra Stadium, Canberra	Won	17	6	G Inglis (3)	G Inglis 2/2, C Cronk 0/1	B Finch	
22 May	11	Bye								
30 May	12	Canterbury-Bankstown Bulldogs	AAMI Park, Melbourne	Won	23	12	D Nielsen, C Stanley, L MacDougall, G Widdop	G Widdop 3/4	B Finch	
4 June	13	Parramatta Eels	Parramatta Stadium, Sydney	Lost	10	24	B Slater, G Inglis	C Smith 1/2		
14 June	14	Sydney Roosters	AAMI Park, Melbourne	Lost	6	38	R Kostjasyn	C Stanley 1/1		
19 June	15	North Queensland Cowboys	AAMI Park, Melbourne	Won	58	12	J O'Neill (3), M Duffie (2), B Slater (2), G Inglis, J Lima, C Cronk	C Smith 5/6, G Inglis 3/3, B Finch 1/1		
26 June	16	South Sydney Rabbitohs	Members Equity Stadium, Perth	Lost	14	16	J O'Neill (2), G Inglis	C Smith 1/3		
2 July	17	Bye								
10 July	18	Canterbury-Bankstown Bulldogs	Adelaide Oval, Adelaide	Lost	18	20	B Finch, B Slater, S Manu	C Smith 2/2, G Inglis 1/1		
17 July	19	New Zealand Warriors	Mt Smart Stadium, Auckland	Lost	6	13	B Slater	C Smith		
24 July	20	Penrith Panthers	AAMI Park, Melbourne	Won	18	10	D Nielsen, J O'Neill, M Duffie	C Smith 3/3		
1 August	21	Canberra Raiders	AAMI Park, Melbourne	Won	36	12	D Nielsen (2), J O'Neill (2), G Inglis, B Slater, T Lowrie	C Smith 4/5, G Inglis 0/1, A Tolman 0/1		
7 August	22	Manly Warringah Sea Eagles	Brookvale Oval, Sydney	Lost	6	26	R Hoffman	C Smith 1/1		
15 August	23	South Sydney Rabbitohs	AAMI Park, Melbourne	Won	18	16	R Hinchcliffe (2), B Slater	C Smith 3/3		
21 August	24	Cronulla-Sutherland Sharks	AAMI Park, Melbourne	Won	24	4	C Smith, D Nielsen, S Manu, R Hinchcliffe	C Smith 4/4		
29 August	25	Wests Tigers	Leichhardt Oval, Sydney	Lost	14	26	J O'Neill, W Isa, R Hoffman	C Smith 1/3		
5 September	26	Newcastle Knights	AAMI Park, Melbourne	Won	34	4	G Inglis (2), R Hinchcliffe, R Hoffman, B White, A Tolman	C Smith 4/4, J Lima 1/1, R Hoffman 0/1		

== Ladder ==
2010 NRL season
Pos.	Team	Pld	W	D	L	B	PF	PA	PD	Pts
1	St. George Illawarra Dragons (P)	24	17	0	7	2	518	299	+219	38
2	Penrith Panthers	24	15	0	9	2	645	489	+156	34
3	Wests Tigers	24	15	0	9	2	537	503	+34	34
4	Gold Coast Titans	24	15	0	9	2	520	498	+22	34
5	New Zealand Warriors	24	14	0	10	2	539	486	+53	32
6	Sydney Roosters	24	14	0	10	2	559	510	+49	32
7	Canberra Raiders	24	13	0	11	2	499	493	+6	30
8	Manly Warringah Sea Eagles	24	12	0	12	2	545	510	+35	28
9	South Sydney Rabbitohs	24	11	0	13	2	584	567	+17	26
10	Brisbane Broncos	24	11	0	13	2	508	535	−27	26
11	Newcastle Knights	24	10	0	14	2	499	569	−70	24
12	Parramatta Eels	24	10	0	14	2	413	491	−78	24
13	Canterbury-Bankstown Bulldogs	24	9	0	15	2	494	539	−45	22
14	Cronulla-Sutherland Sharks	24	7	0	17	2	354	609	−255	18
15	North Queensland Cowboys	24	5	0	19	2	425	667	−242	14
16	Melbourne Storm	24	14	0	10	2	489	363	+126	0^{1}

^{1} Melbourne were deducted eight premiership points and barred from receiving premiership points for the rest of the season due to gross long-term salary cap breaches.

== 2010 Coaching staff ==
- Head coach: Craig Bellamy
- Assistant coaches: Brad Arthur & Stephen Kearney
- Strength and conditioning Coach: Alex Corvo
- Football Manager: Frank Ponissi
- NRL Under 20s Coach: Dean Pay
- NSW Cup Coach: Tony Adam

== 2010 squad ==
Cap (Note: Players are listed with the cap number as they appear on the Melbourne Storm honour board. Additional squad members do not have a cap number.)	Nat.	Player name	Position	First Storm Game	Previous First Grade RL club (Note: This column denotes the previous RL club the player was signed to and played first grade RL for. If they are yet to debut then this is stipulated. If they were merely signed to the club but did not play then it is not counted.)
55	(Australia)	Cameron Smith (c)	HK	2002	(Australia) Melbourne Storm
58	(Australia)	Billy Slater	FB	2003	(Australia) Melbourne Storm
62	(Australia)	Ryan Hoffman	SR, LK	2003	(Australia) Melbourne Storm
73	(Australia)	Cooper Cronk	HB	2004	(Australia) Melbourne Storm
76	(Australia)	Brett White	PR	2005	(Australia) Melbourne Storm
79	(Australia)	Greg Inglis	FE, CE,	2005	(Australia) Melbourne Storm
86	(New Zealand)	Adam Blair	SR, PR	2006	(Australia) Melbourne Storm
90	(New Zealand)	Jeff Lima	PR, LK	2006	(Australia) Wests Tigers
91	(Australia)	Anthony Quinn	WG, CE	2007	(Australia) Newcastle Knights
98	(New Zealand)	Sika Manu	SR	2007	(Australia) Melbourne Storm
102	(Australia)	Aiden Tolman	PR	2008	(Australia) Melbourne Storm
104	(Australia)	Dane Nielsen	WG, CE	2008	(Australia) Melbourne Storm
105	(New Zealand)	Kevin Proctor	SR	2008	(Australia) Melbourne Storm
109	(Tonga)	Sinbad Kali	SR, LK	2008	(Australia) Melbourne Storm
110	(Australia)	Ryan Hinchcliffe	HK, LK	2009	(Australia) Canberra Raiders
111	(Samoa)	Willie Isa	WG, CE	2009	(Australia) Penrith Panthers
115	(Australia)	Brett Finch	HB, FE	2009	(Australia) Parramatta Eels
116	(Australia)	Luke Kelly	FE, HB	2009	(Australia) Melbourne Storm
117	(New Zealand)	Hep Cahill	LK, SR	2009	(Australia) Melbourne Storm
118	(Republic of Ireland)	Ryan Tandy	PR, SR	2009	(Australia) Wests Tigers
119	(New Zealand)	Jesse Bromwich	PR	2010	(Australia) Melbourne Storm
120	(Republic of Ireland)	Rory Kostjasyn	HK, LK	2010	(Australia) Melbourne Storm
121	(Australia)	Todd Lowrie	SR, LK	2010	(Australia) Newcastle Knights
122	(Australia)	Luke MacDougall	WG	2010	(Australia) Newcastle Knights
123	(Australia)	Bryan Norrie	PR	2010	(Australia) Cronulla Sharks
124	(New Zealand)	Matt Duffie	WG	2010	(Australia) Melbourne Storm
125	(England)	Gareth Widdop	FE, FB	2010	(Australia) Melbourne Storm
126	(New Zealand)	Chase Stanley	CE	2010	(Australia) St George Illawarra Dragons
127	(Vanuatu)	Justin O'Neill	CE	2010	(Australia) Melbourne Storm
128	(Australia)	Robbie Rochow	SR	2010	(Australia) Melbourne Storm
129	(Tonga)	Sione Kite	PR	2010	(Australia) Canterbury Bulldogs
	(New Zealand)	Louis Fanene	CE	Yet to Debut	(Australia) Melbourne Storm
	(New Zealand)	Slade Griffen	HK	Yet to Debut	(Australia) Melbourne Storm
	(Australia)	Andrew Brown	HB, FE	Yet to Debut	(Australia) Melbourne Storm
	(France)	Dane Chisholm	FE, CE	Yet to Debut	(Australia) Melbourne Storm
	(Cook Islands)	Fred Makimare	PR	Yet to Debut	(Australia) Melbourne Storm
	(Samoa)	Kirisome Auva'a	CE	Yet to Debut	(Australia) Melbourne Storm
	(Tonga)	Atelea Vea	SR	Yet to Debut	(Australia) Cronulla-Sutherland Sharks

== Player movements ==
Losses

- Brett Anderson to Released (Note: Subsequently contracted by Northern Pride.)
- Scott Anderson to Brisbane Broncos
- Matthew Cross to Manly Warringah Sea Eagles
- Dallas Johnson to Catalans Dragons
- James Maloney to New Zealand Warriors
- Ryan Tandy to Canterbury-Bankstown Bulldogs (midseason)
- Joseph Tomane to Gold Coast Titans
- Steve Turner to Canterbury-Bankstown Bulldogs
- Wairangi Koopu to Retirement

Gains

- Sione Kite from Canterbury-Bankstown Bulldogs
- Todd Lowrie from Parramatta Eels
- Luke MacDougall from Newcastle Knights
- Bryan Norrie from Cronulla-Sutherland Sharks
- Chase Stanley from St George Illawarra Dragons
- Atelea Vea from Cronulla-Sutherland Sharks

== Representative honours ==
This table lists all players who have played a representative match in 2010.

Player	2010 All Stars match	2010 ANZAC Test	City vs Country Origin	State of Origin 1	State of Origin 2	State of Origin 3	2010 Four Nations	Other Internationals
Adam Blair	NRL All Stars	New Zealand	—N/a	—N/a	—N/a	—N/a	New Zealand	—N/a
Cooper Cronk	—N/a	Australia	—N/a	Queensland	Queensland	Queensland	Australia	—N/a
Brett Finch	NRL All Stars	—N/a	—N/a	—N/a	—N/a	—N/a	—N/a	—N/a
Ryan Hoffman	—N/a	—N/a	City	—N/a	—N/a	—N/a	—N/a	—N/a
Greg Inglis	—N/a	Australia	—N/a	Queensland	Queensland	Queensland	—N/a	—N/a
Willie Isa	—N/a	—N/a	—N/a	—N/a	—N/a	—N/a	—N/a	Samoa
Sika Manu	—N/a	New Zealand	—N/a	—N/a	—N/a	—N/a	New Zealand	—N/a
Justin O'Neill	—N/a	—N/a	—N/a	—N/a	—N/a	—N/a	—N/a	Junior Kangaroos
Kevin Proctor	—N/a	—N/a	—N/a	—N/a	—N/a	—N/a	—N/a	Māori
Billy Slater	—N/a	Australia	—N/a	Queensland	Queensland	Queensland	Australia	—N/a
Cameron Smith	NRL All Stars	Australia	—N/a	—N/a	Queensland	Queensland	Australia	—N/a
Brett White	—N/a	—N/a	Country	New South Wales	New South Wales	—N/a	Australia	—N/a
Gareth Widdop	—N/a	—N/a	—N/a	—N/a	—N/a	—N/a	England	England (Note: Widdop made his international debut for England in a test match against France in June 2010.)

== Statistics ==
This table contains playing statistics for all Melbourne Storm players to have played in the 2010 NRL season.

- Statistics sources:

Name	Appearances	Tries	Goals	Field goals	Points
Adam Blair	22	1	0	0	4
Jesse Bromwich	7	0	0	0	0
Hep Cahill	5	0	0	0	0
Cooper Cronk	21	3	0	1	13
Matthew Duffie	14	8	0	0	32
Brett Finch	21	3	1	2	16
Ryan Hinchcliffe	23	4	0	0	16
Ryan Hoffman	16	3	0	0	12
Greg Inglis	20	11	7	0	58
Willie Isa	3	2	0	0	8
Luke Kelly	4	0	0	0	0
Sione Kite	2	0	0	0	0
Rory Kostjasyn	6	1	0	0	4
Jeff Lima	20	2	1	0	10
Todd Lowrie	22	1	0	0	4
Luke MacDougall	10	4	0	0	16
Sika Manu	14	2	0	0	8
Dane Nielsen	21	8	0	0	32
Bryan Norrie	21	2	0	0	8
Justin O'Neill	9	9	0	0	36
Kevin Proctor	22	0	0	0	0
Anthony Quinn	9	7	0	0	28
Robbie Rochow	1	0	0	0	0
Billy Slater	22	10	0	0	40
Cameron Smith	20	2	54	0	116
Chase Stanley	7	1	1	0	6
Ryan Tandy	10	1	0	0	4
Aiden Tolman	19	1	0	0	4
Brett White	14	1	0	0	4
Gareth Widdop	3	1	3	0	10
30 players used	–	88	67	3	489

=== Scorers ===
Most points in a game: 16 points

- Round 7 – Cameron Smith (1 try, 6 goals) vs New Zealand Warriors
- Round 10 – Greg Inglis (3 tries, 2 goals) vs Canberra Raiders

Most tries in a game: 3

- Round 5 – Anthony Quinn vs Gold Coast Titans
- Round 10 – Greg Inglis vs Canberra Raiders
- Round 15 – Justin O'Neill vs North Queensland Cowboys

=== Winning games ===
Highest score in a winning game: 58 points

- Round 15 vs North Queensland Cowboys

Lowest score in a winning game: 14 points

- Round 1 vs Cronulla-Sutherland Sharks

Greatest winning margin: 46 points

- Round 15 vs North Queensland Cowboys

Greatest number of games won consecutively: 4

- Round 1 – Round 4

=== Losing games ===
Highest score in a losing game: 18 points

- Round 18 vs Canterbury-Bankstown Bulldogs

Lowest score in a losing game: 6 points

- Round 14 vs Sydney Roosters
- Round 19 vs New Zealand Warriors
- Round 22 vs Manly Warringah Sea Eagles

Greatest losing margin: 32 points

- Round 14 vs Sydney Roosters

Greatest number of games lost consecutively: 3

- Round 16 – Round 19

== Reserve grade ==
For the first time in club history, a reserve grade team played as Melbourne Storm, with the club entering a team into the New South Wales Cup competition. Coached by former Canberra Raiders 2008 Toyota Cup winning coach, Tony Adam, Melbourne finished in seventh position on the ladder (out of 12 teams) qualifying for the finals series. They were eliminated by Balmain-Ryde Eastwood Tigers in the first week of the finals, defeated 48–18. This was the only season that Melbourne until 2026 that fielded a reserve grade team under their own brand.

2010 New South Wales Cup
Pos	Team	Pld	W	D	L	PF	PA	PD	Pts
7	Melbourne Storm	25	11	0	14	627	727	-100	22

== NRL Under 20s ==
In the third season of the NRL's National Youth Championship, Dean Pay replaced Brad Arthur as coach, with Melbourne finishing the regular season in 13th place on the ladder.

=== Ladder ===
National Youth Competition season 2010
	Team	Pld	W	D	L	B	PF	PA	PD	Pts
1	South Sydney Rabbitohs	24	17	0	7	2	687	567	+120	38
2	New Zealand Warriors (P)	24	16	1	7	2	731	481	+250	37
3	Canterbury-Bankstown Bulldogs	24	15	2	7	2	773	596	+177	36
4	North Queensland Cowboys	24	14	3	7	2	673	540	+133	35
5	Sydney Roosters	24	14	1	9	2	695	588	+107	33
6	Canberra Raiders	24	14	1	9	2	764	734	+30	33
7	Manly Warringah Sea Eagles	24	13	0	11	2	568	583	-15	30
8	Gold Coast Titans	24	12	1	11	2	581	663	-82	29
9	Wests Tigers	24	12	0	12	2	620	532	+88	28
10	Brisbane Broncos	24	11	1	12	2	690	635	+55	27
11	St. George Illawarra Dragons	24	10	1	13	2	568	543	+25	25
12	Newcastle Knights	24	9	1	14	2	612	732	-120	23
13	Melbourne Storm	24	8	2	14	2	683	782	-99	22
14	Cronulla-Sutherland Sharks	24	8	1	15	2	492	634	-142	21
15	Penrith Panthers	24	8	0	16	2	643	838	-195	20
16	Parramatta Eels	24	3	1	20	2	454	786	-332	11

=== Statistics ===
==== Scorers ====
Most points in a game: 18 points

- Round 20 – Josh Jerome (1 try, 7 goals) vs Penrith Panthers
- Round 23 – Josh Jerome (1 try, 7 goals) vs South Sydney Rabbitohs

Most tries in a game: 3

- Round 2 – Blake Leary vs Newcastle Knights
- Round 2 – Justin O'Neill vs Newcastle Knights
- Round 18 – Mahe Fonua vs Canterbury-Bankstown Bulldogs

Most points (season): 180

- Josh Jerome (9 tries, 72 goals)

Most tries (season): 12

- Eddie Fa'amausili
- Blake Leary

==== Winning games ====
Highest score in a winning game: 62 points

- Round 2 vs Newcastle Knights

Lowest score in a winning game: 20 points

- Round 25 vs Wests Tigers

Greatest winning margin: 52 points

- Round 2 vs Newcastle Knights

Greatest number of games won consecutively: 3

- Round 1 – Round 3
- Round 24 – Round 26

==== Losing games ====
Highest score in a losing game: 42 points

- Round 23 vs Canberra Raiders

Lowest score in a losing game: 12 points

- Round 14 vs Sydney Roosters
- Round 19 vs New Zealand Warriors

Greatest losing margin: 48 points

- Round 14 vs Sydney Roosters

Greatest number of games lost consecutively: 6

- Round 6 – Round 12

== S. G. Ball Cup ==
For the second consecutive season, Melbourne entered a junior representative team in the New South Wales Rugby League under-18s competition S. G. Ball Cup. Melbourne would play most of their home games at their training venue Princes Park in Carlton.

Coached by club high performance manager Kim Williams, the team would again make the finals, finishing the regular season in sixth position on the ladder with seven wins from nine matches. Melbourne would lose an elimination final against third-placed Parramatta 70–12 to end their season.

== Awards ==
=== Melbourne Storm Awards Night ===
Held at Crown Palladium on Friday, 10 September:

- Melbourne Storm Player of the Year: Ryan Hinchcliffe
- Member's Player of the Year: Cooper Cronk
- Best Forward: Cameron Smith
- Best Back: Cooper Cronk
- Most Improved: Dane Neilsen
- Melbourne Storm Rookie of the Year: Matt Duffie
- Best Try: Matt Duffie – Round 15 vs North Queensland Cowboys
- NSW Cup Player of the Year: Jesse Bromwich
- Darren Bell U20s Player of the Year Award: Tohu Harris
- U20s Most Improved: Jarome Wilson
- U20s Best Forward: Kenny Bromwich
- U20s Best Back: Kirisome Auva'a
- Greg Brentnall Trophy (Young Achievers Award): Richard Kennar
- Mick Moore Club Person of the Year: Craig Bellamy
- Life Member Inductees: Craig Bellamy & Stephen Kearney

=== Dally M Awards Night ===
- Dally M Rep Player of the Year: Billy Slater

=== Additional Awards ===
- New Zealand Kiwis Junior Player of the Year: Matt Duffie
- Wally Lewis Medal: Billy Slater
