= 2009 Melbourne Storm season =

- NRL Rank: 4th
- Play-off result: Grand Final Winners
- 2009 record: Wins: 14; draws: 1; losses: 9
- Points scored: For: 505; against: 348

Team information
- CEO: Brian Waldron
- Coach: Craig Bellamy
- Captain: Cameron Smith (24 Games) Cooper Cronk (3 Games)
- Stadium: Olympic Park
- Avg. attendance: 11,978
- High attendance: 27,687 (Preliminary Final)

Top scorers
- Tries: Billy Slater (18)
- Goals: Cameron Smith (65)
- Points: Cameron Smith (142)
| ← 2008 | List of seasons | 2010 → |

The 2009 Melbourne Storm season was the 12th in the club's history. They competed in the NRL's 2009 Telstra Premiership and finished the regular season 4th out of 16 teams. They then progressed to their fourth consecutive grand final, this time to be played against the Parramatta Eels and won, claiming their second premiership in three seasons, a title later stripped in 2010 after being found guilty of salary cap breaches.

A slow start to the season saw Melbourne win just three of their first seven games. However the team rallied, losing just one of their next seven to move into fourth position by Round 14, where they would remain for the rest of the season. The finals series was when Melbourne really hit their straps, winning their first two finals by 28 and 30 points respectively. In the Grand Final, Storm defeated Parramatta 23–16 with Billy Slater named the Clive Churchill Medalist.

Melbourne played all their regular season home games at Olympic Park, the final season playing at the venue before moving to the new Melbourne Rectangular Stadium the following season.

== Season summary ==
- 2 February – New signing Arana Taumata is sacked by the club after he was arrested following an alcohol-fuelled brawl. Three other Storm players were involved in the incident, but only Taumata eventually faced charges. Melbourne became the fourth club in as many years to sack Taumata for disciplinary reasons. Taumata would later plead guilty to assault.
- Round 1 – A field goal in the fourth minute of golden point extra time by Greg Inglis gives Melbourne a thrilling 17–16 win over St George Illawarra Dragons in the 2009 season opening game at Olympic Park. The game was the first played under the NRL's dual-referee system.
- Round 2 – A try by former Storm player Israel Folau and a highly controversial try by Peter Wallace hands Brisbane Broncos a 16–14 win over Melbourne at Suncorp Stadium. It is the Broncos first win over Melbourne since the 2006 NRL Grand Final.
- 14 April – After being informed that he was not fit into their long-term plans, Parramatta Eels' halfback Brett Finch signs with Melbourne, joining the club for the remainder of the 2009 season.
- Round 7 – Hosting a match on ANZAC Day for just the second time, Melbourne drew 14–14 against New Zealand Warriors in wet and slippery conditions at Olympic Park. Warriors fullback Lance Hohaia looked to have broken the deadlock with less than a minute left in golden point extra time, before the video referee disallowed his successful field goal attempt due to a knock-on in the lead up from Stacey Jones. The drawn result was the club's first since the institution of golden point in 2003.
- Round 8 – Melbourne exact a small amount of revenge on Manly with a 22–8 win at Brookvale Oval in their first rematch since the 2008 NRL Grand Final.
- Round 9 – With eight players backing up from the midseason test only three nights earlier, regular captain Cameron Smith starts from the bench, with Cooper Cronk taking over as acting captain. Melbourne defeat Sydney Roosters 28–12 in front of a small crowd at Gosford.
- 13 May – Part-time specialist coach Matthew Johns indefinitely parted ways with the club following his involvement in a sex scandal.
- Round 10 – Melbourne claim their 14th-straight win over Canberra Raiders, winning 46–6, their greatest winning margin over the Raiders.
- Round 13 – Two days after the opening State of Origin match, Melbourne thrash Brisbane 48–4 at Olympic Park, with Joe Tomane scoring 24 points (three tries, six goals).
- Round 14 – Melbourne returned to Perth for the first time since 1999, defeating South Sydney Rabbitohs 28–22 at Members Equity Stadium.
- Round 15 – Dane Nielsen becomes the first player sent off for the season, after a high tackle on Wests Tigers winger Beau Ryan. With only a few minutes remaining after Nielsen's dismissal, Melbourne hold on to win 14–12.
- Round 16 – Canberra defeat Melbourne 26–16 at Canberra Stadium, to win their first game against Storm since 2002.
- 30 July – Brett Finch signs a one-year deal to stay with Melbourne in 2010.
- 7 August – Melbourne announce that they will end their feeder club arrangement with Central Coast Storm and establish their own team in the NSW Cup in 2010.
- 10 August – Greg Inglis is charged by police for assaulting his girlfriend Sally Robinson. He is immediately stood-down by Melbourne, with club sponsor ME Bank reportedly reviewing their position with the club.
- 27 August – The Melbourne Storm board allow Greg Inglis to resume playing, despite still facing assault charges.
- Round 25 – In the club's last game at Olympic Park, the return of Greg Inglis sparked Melbourne to a 38–4 win over Sydney Roosters, ending a two-game losing streak. Melbourne finish with 104 wins from 136 games at Olympic Park, an imposing 76.5 winning percentage.
- Round 26 – Melbourne book a top-four finish, with an impressive 30–0 win over New Zealand Warriors to regain the Michael Moore Trophy.
- Qualifying Final – Returning to Etihad Stadium, Melbourne thrash Manly 40-12 led by four tries from Billy Slater. The win, coupled with upsets in the other qualifying finals earns Melbourne a week off and a preliminary final in Melbourne.
- Preliminary Final – Held on the night of the 2009 AFL Grand Final, a crowd of 27,687 watches Melbourne demolish Brisbane 40–10 to make their fourth successive Grand Final. A hat-trick of tries to Greg Inglis helping Melbourne end Brisbane's season in disappointment for the third year in a row.
- Grand Final – Melbourne Storm win their 3rd Grand Final in their 11-year history, beating the Parramatta Eels 23–16 at ANZ Stadium in front of crowd of 82,538. Billy Slater is awarded the Clive Churchill Medal, as Melbourne lead all night withstanding a late Parramatta comeback.
- 12 November – Salary cap pressure forces Melbourne to bid farewell to Dallas Johnson who subsequently signs with Catalans Dragons on a three-year deal.

=== Milestone games ===
| Round | Player | Milestone |
|---|---|---|
| Round 1 | Willie Isa | Storm debut |
| Round 1 | Ryan Hinchcliffe | Storm debut |
| Round 1 | Wairangi Koopu | Storm debut |
| Round 5 | James Maloney | NRL debut |
| Round 5 | Matthew Cross | Storm debut |
| Round 6 | Cameron Smith | 150th game |
| Round 7 | Brett Finch | Storm debut |
| Round 15 | Brett White | 100th game |
| Round 19 | Luke Kelly | NRL debut |
| Round 20 | Hep Cahill | NRL debut |
| Round 22 | Billy Slater | 150th game |
| Round 22 | Dallas Johnson | 150th game |
| Round 22 | Steve Turner | 100th NRL game |
| Round 23 | Matthew Cross | 50th NRL game |
| Round 24 | Ryan Tandy | Storm debut |
| Round 25 | Ryan Hoffman | 150th game |
| Preliminary Final | Billy Slater | 100th NRL try |

=== Jerseys ===
New apparel supplier KooGa kept the same home and clash jersey design as worn in 2008. ME Bank replaced Medibank as the main jersey advertiser, with all other advertisers continuing their sponsorships from 2008.

In round 10 against Canberra, Melbourne wore a heritage jersey based on the design of the 2001-02 clash jersey, featuring purple with silver thunderbolts. This would be the first time the club had worn an away or clash jersey at Olympic Park.

In the farewell match to Olympic Park in round 25, a special edition of the home jersey had the names of all Storm players in alphabetical order sublimated into purple section of the front of the design, additional embroidery, as well as metallic silver numbers on the back.

== Fixtures ==
=== Preseason ===
| Date | Rd | Opponent | Venue | Result | Mel. | Opp. | Tries | Goals | Field goals | Ref |
|---|---|---|---|---|---|---|---|---|---|---|
| 12 February | Trial | New Zealand Warriors | Waikato Stadium, Hamilton, New Zealand | Lost | 12 | 24 | W Isa, J Tomane | J Maloney, J Williams | | |
| 21 February | Trial | Newcastle Knights | Visy Park, Melbourne | Won | 32 | 24 | W Isa (2), J Lima, R Hoffman, G Inglis, A Quinn | C Smith (4) | | |
| 28 February | Trial | Brisbane Broncos | Stockland Park, Sunshine Coast | Won | 20 | 6 | W Isa, J Tomane, B Slater, W Chambers | G Inglis (2) | | |

=== Regular season ===
==== Result by round ====
| Round | 1 | 2 | 3 | 4 | 5 | 6 | 7 | 8 | 9 | 10 | 11 | 12 | 13 | 14 | 15 | 16 | 17 | 18 | 19 | 20 | 21 | 22 | 23 | 24 | 25 | 26 |
|---|---|---|---|---|---|---|---|---|---|---|---|---|---|---|---|---|---|---|---|---|---|---|---|---|---|---|
| Ground | H | A | A | H | H | A | H | A | A | H | A | – | H | A | H | A | H | – | A | H | A | H | A | H | H | A |
| Result | W | L | W | L | W | L | D | W | W | W | L | B | W | W | W | L | W | B | L | W | L | W | L | L | W | W |
| Position | 7 | 8 | 4 | 8 | 7 | 7 | 8 | 6 | 6 | 5 | 7 | 6 | 5 | 4 | 4 | 4 | 4 | 4 | 4 | 4 | 4 | 4 | 4 | 4 | 4 | 4 |
| Points | 2 | 2 | 4 | 4 | 6 | 6 | 7 | 9 | 11 | 13 | 13 | 15 | 17 | 19 | 21 | 21 | 23 | 25 | 25 | 27 | 27 | 29 | 29 | 29 | 31 | 33 |

Source: Rugby League Tables
A = Away; H = Home; N = Neutral; B = Bye; W = Win; D = Draw; L = Loss

==== Matches ====
- (g.p.) – Golden Point extra time
- (pen) – Penalty try

| Date | Rd | Opponent | Venue | Result | Mel. | Opp. | Tries | Goals | Field goals | Ref |
|---|---|---|---|---|---|---|---|---|---|---|
| 13 March | 1 | St George Illawarra Dragons | Olympic Park, Melbourne | Won (g.p.) | 17 | 16 | C Cronk, G Inglis, B Slater | C Smith 2/3 | G Inglis | |
| 20 March | 2 | Brisbane Broncos | Suncorp Stadium, Brisbane | Lost | 14 | 16 | K Proctor, B Slater | C Smith 3/3 | | |
| 28 March | 3 | North Queensland Cowboys | Dairy Farmers Stadium, Townsville | Won | 26 | 12 | C Cronk, G Inglis, A Quinn, S Turner | C Smith 5/5 | | |
| 4 April | 4 | Gold Coast Titans | Olympic Park, Melbourne | Lost | 6 | 18 | J Tomane | C Smith 1/1 | | |
| 11 April | 5 | Penrith Panthers | Olympic Park, Melbourne | Won | 16 | 14 | A Quinn, B Slater | C Smith 4/4 | | |
| 20 April | 6 | Wests Tigers | Leichhardt Oval, Sydney | Lost | 6 | 16 | R Hoffman | C Smith 1/1 | | |
| 25 April | 7 | New Zealand Warriors | Olympic Park, Melbourne | Draw | 14 | 14 | W Chambers, B Slater, S Turner | C Smith 1/3 | | |
| 1 May | 8 | Manly-Warringah Sea Eagles | Brookvale Oval, Sydney | Won | 22 | 8 | M Cross, G Inglis, B Slater, S Turner | C Smith 3/5 | | |
| 11 May | 9 | Sydney Roosters | Bluetongue Stadium, Gosford | Won | 28 | 12 | B Finch, R Hoffman, J Lima, S Turner, B White | J Tomane 4/5 | | |
| 18 May | 10 | Canberra Raiders | Olympic Park, Melbourne | Won | 46 | 6 | B Slater (2), A Blair, M Cross, R Hoffman, G Inglis, J Lima, S Turner | C Smith 6/7, J Tomane 1/1 | | |
| 23 May | 11 | Canterbury-Bankstown Bulldogs | Bluetongue Stadium, Gosford | Lost | 10 | 26 | W Chambers (2) | C Smith 1/2 | | |
| 30 May | 12 | Bye | | | | | | | | |
| 5 June | 13 | Brisbane Broncos | Olympic Park, Melbourne | Won | 48 | 4 | J Tomane (3), C Cronk (2), W Chambers, G Inglis, B Slater, A Tolman | J Tomane 6/9 | | |
| 13 June | 14 | South Sydney Rabbitohs | Members Equity Stadium, Perth | Won | 28 | 22 | C Cronk, R Hoffman, G Inglis, W Koopu, J Tomane, S Turner | C Smith 2/5, J Tomane 0/1 | | |
| 21 June | 15 | Wests Tigers | Olympic Park, Melbourne | Won | 14 | 12 | C Cronk, M Cross | J Tomane 3/3 | | |
| 28 June | 16 | Canberra Raiders | Canberra Stadium, Canberra | Lost | 16 | 26 | W Chambers, G Inglis, C Smith | C Smith 2/2, J Tomane 0/1 | | |
| 4 July | 17 | Newcastle Knights | Olympic Park, Melbourne | Won | 18 | 14 | W Chambers, G Inglis, B Slater | C Smith 3/3 | | |
| 11 July | 18 | Bye | | | | | | | | |
| 20 July | 19 | Parramatta Eels | Parramatta Stadium, Sydney | Lost | 16 | 18 | R Hoffman, D Nielsen, J Tomane | J Tomane 2/3 | | |
| 25 July | 20 | Cronulla-Sutherland Sharks | Olympic Park, Melbourne | Won | 30 | 10 | B Anderson (2), W Chambers, R Hinchcliffe, C Smith, J Tomane | C Smith 2/5, J Tomane 1/2 | | |
| 31 July | 21 | St George Illawarra Dragons | WIN Jubilee Oval, Sydney | Lost | 12 | 26 | B Finch, G Inglis | C Smith 2/3 | | |
| 7 August | 22 | North Queensland Cowboys | Olympic Park, Melbourne | Won | 20 | 8 | C Cronk, B Finch, J Tomane, S Turner | C Smith 2/4 | | |
| 17 August | 23 | Newcastle Knights | EnergyAustralia Stadium, Newcastle | Lost | 14 | 26 | B Anderson, C Cronk, S Turner | C Smith 1/3 | | |
| 23 August | 24 | Manly-Warringah Sea Eagles | Olympic Park, Melbourne | Lost | 16 | 20 | J Tomane (2), W Chambers | C Smith 2/3 | | |
| 29 August | 25 | Sydney Roosters | Olympic Park, Melbourne | Won | 38 | 4 | G Inglis (2), S Turner (2), W Chambers, B Slater, A Tolman | C Smith 5/6, R Hoffman 0/1 | | |
| 5 September | 26 | New Zealand Warriors | Mt Smart Stadium, Auckland | Won | 30 | 0 | W Chambers (2), R Hinchcliffe, G Inglis, D Nielsen, B Slater | C Smith 3/5, G Inglis 0/1 | | |

=== Finals ===
Qualifying final

Friday, 11 September
19:45 AEST (UTC+10)

| Melbourne Storm | 40 – 12 | Manly Warringah Sea Eagles |
|---|---|---|
| Tries: 7 Slater, 3', 36', 44', 77'; Nielsen 26'; Smith 50'; Tolman 60'; Goals: 6 Smith 28', 37', 45', 51', 61' (5/6); Turner 78' (1/1) | 1st: 16–0; 2nd: 24–12 | Tries: 2 Foran; Matai; Goals: 2 Orford (2/2) |

Etihad Stadium, Melbourne
Attendance: 21,155
Referees: Gavin Badger, Shayne Hayne

Preliminary final

Saturday, 26 September
19:45 AEST (UTC+10)

| Melbourne Storm | 40 – 10 | Brisbane Broncos |
|---|---|---|
| Tries: 7 Inglis 39', 45', 69'; Slater 20', 73'; Chambers 3'; Johnson 25'; Goals: 6 Smith (6/7) | 1st: 22–0; 2nd: 18–10 | Tries: 2 Glenn 59'; Folau 80'; Goals: 1 Parker 60' (1/1) |

Etihad Stadium, Melbourne
Attendance: 27,687
Referees: Shayne Hayne, Jared Maxwell

2009 NRL Grand Final

Sunday, 4 October
17:15 AEDT (UTC+11)

| Melbourne Storm | 23 – 16 | Parramatta Eels |
|---|---|---|
| Tries: 4 Hoffman 5'; Blair 24'; Inglis 49'; Slater 55'; Goals: 3 Smith 7', 50', 57' (3/4); Field goals: 1 Inglis 77' | 1st: 10–0; 2nd: 13–16 | Tries: 3 Grothe 45'; Reddy 70'; Moimoi 72'; Goals: 2 Burt 46', 70' (2/3) |

ANZ Stadium, Sydney
Attendance: 82,538
Referees: Tony Archer, Shayne Hayne
Touch judges: Paul Holland, David Abood
Clive Churchill Medal: Billy Slater (Melbourne)

== Ladder ==
2009 NRL season
| Pos | Team | Pld | W | D | L | B | PF | PA | PD | Pts |
|---|---|---|---|---|---|---|---|---|---|---|
| 1 | St. George Illawarra Dragons | 24 | 17 | 0 | 7 | 2 | 548 | 329 | +219 | 38 |
| 2 | Canterbury-Bankstown Bulldogs | 24 | 18 | 0 | 6 | 2 | 575 | 428 | +147 | 38^{1} |
| 3 | Gold Coast Titans | 24 | 16 | 0 | 8 | 2 | 514 | 467 | +47 | 36 |
| 4 | Melbourne Storm | 24 | 14 | 1 | 9 | 2 | 505 | 348 | +157 | 33 |
| 5 | Manly-Warringah Sea Eagles | 24 | 14 | 0 | 10 | 2 | 549 | 459 | +90 | 32 |
| 6 | Brisbane Broncos | 24 | 14 | 0 | 10 | 2 | 511 | 566 | −55 | 32 |
| 7 | Newcastle Knights | 24 | 13 | 0 | 11 | 2 | 508 | 491 | +17 | 30 |
| 8 | Parramatta Eels | 24 | 12 | 1 | 11 | 2 | 476 | 473 | +3 | 29 |
| 9 | Wests Tigers | 24 | 12 | 0 | 12 | 2 | 558 | 483 | +75 | 28 |
| 10 | South Sydney Rabbitohs | 24 | 11 | 1 | 12 | 2 | 566 | 549 | +17 | 27 |
| 11 | Penrith Panthers | 24 | 11 | 1 | 12 | 2 | 515 | 589 | −74 | 27 |
| 12 | North Queensland Cowboys | 24 | 11 | 0 | 13 | 2 | 558 | 474 | +84 | 26 |
| 13 | Canberra Raiders | 24 | 9 | 0 | 15 | 2 | 489 | 520 | −31 | 22 |
| 14 | New Zealand Warriors | 24 | 7 | 2 | 15 | 2 | 377 | 565 | −188 | 20 |
| 15 | Cronulla-Sutherland Sharks | 24 | 5 | 0 | 19 | 2 | 359 | 568 | −209 | 14 |
| 16 | Sydney Roosters | 24 | 5 | 0 | 19 | 2 | 382 | 681 | −299 | 14 |

^{1} The Bulldogs were deducted 2 competition points after an interchange breach in Round 2.

== 2009 Coaching Staff ==
- Head coach: Craig Bellamy
- Assistant coaches: Michael Maguire & Stephen Kearney
- Development coach: Tony Adam
- Strength and conditioning Coach: Alex Corvo
- Football Manager: Frank Ponissi
- NRL Under 20s Coach: Brad Arthur
- Feeder Club Coach: Jamie Feeney (Central Coast Storm)

== 2009 squad ==
List current as of 3 May 2022

| Cap (Note: Players are listed with the cap number as they appear on the Melbourne Storm honour board. Additional squad members do not have a cap number.) | Nat. | Player name | Position | First Storm Game | Previous First Grade RL club (Note: This column denotes the previous rugby league club the player was signed to and played first grade rugby league for. If they are yet to debut then this is stipulated. If they were merely signed to the club but did not play then it is not counted.) |
|---|---|---|---|---|---|
| 55 | (Australia) | Cameron Smith (c) | HK | 2002 | (Australia) Melbourne Storm |
| 58 | (Australia) | Billy Slater | FB | 2003 | (Australia) Melbourne Storm |
| 60 | (Australia) | Dallas Johnson | SR, LK | 2003 | (Australia) Melbourne Storm |
| 62 | (Australia) | Ryan Hoffman | SR, LK | 2003 | (Australia) Melbourne Storm |
| 72 | (Australia) | Steve Turner | FB, WG | 2004 | (Australia) Penrith Panthers |
| 73 | (Australia) | Cooper Cronk | HB | 2004 | (Australia) Melbourne Storm |
| 76 | (Australia) | Brett White | PR | 2005 | (Australia) Melbourne Storm |
| 79 | (Australia) | Greg Inglis | FE, CE, | 2005 | (Australia) Melbourne Storm |
| 86 | (New Zealand) | Adam Blair | SR, PR | 2006 | (Australia) Melbourne Storm |
| 90 | (New Zealand) | Jeff Lima | PR, LK | 2006 | (Australia) Wests Tigers |
| 91 | (Australia) | Anthony Quinn | WG, CE | 2007 | (Australia) Newcastle Knights |
| 97 | (Australia) | Will Chambers | CE | 2007 | (Australia) Melbourne Storm |
| 98 | (New Zealand) | Sika Manu | SR | 2007 | (Australia) Melbourne Storm |
| 99 | (Australia) | Scott Anderson | SR, PR | 2007 | (Australia) Melbourne Storm |
| 102 | (Australia) | Aiden Tolman | PR | 2008 | (Australia) Melbourne Storm |
| 103 | (Australia) | Brett Anderson | WG, CE | 2008 | (Australia) Melbourne Storm |
| 104 | (Australia) | Dane Nielsen | WG, CE | 2008 | (Australia) Melbourne Storm |
| 105 | (New Zealand) | Kevin Proctor | SR | 2008 | (Australia) Melbourne Storm |
| 107 | (Samoa) | Joseph Tomane | WG, CE | 2008 | (Australia) Melbourne Storm |
| 109 | (Tonga) | Sinbad Kali | SR, LK | 2008 | (Australia) Melbourne Storm |
| 110 | (Australia) | Ryan Hinchcliffe | HK, LK | 2009 | (Australia) Canberra Raiders |
| 111 | (Samoa) | Willie Isa | WG, CE | 2009 | (Australia) Penrith Panthers |
| 112 | (New Zealand) | Wairangi Koopu | SR, LK | 2009 | New Zealand Warriors |
| 113 | (Australia) | James Maloney | HB, FE | 2009 | (Australia) Melbourne Storm |
| 114 | (Australia) | Matt Cross | PR | 2009 | (Australia) Gold Coast Titans |
| 115 | (Australia) | Brett Finch | HB, FE | 2009 | (Australia) Parramatta Eels |
| 116 | (Australia) | Luke Kelly | FE, HB | 2009 | (Australia) Melbourne Storm |
| 117 | (New Zealand) | Hep Cahill | LK, SR | 2009 | (Australia) Melbourne Storm |
| 118 | (Republic of Ireland) | Ryan Tandy | PR, SR | 2009 | (Australia) Wests Tigers |
| — | (New Zealand) | Louis Fonene | CE | Yet to Debut | (Australia) Melbourne Storm |
| — | (New Zealand) | Jesse Bromwich | PR | Yet to Debut | (Australia) Melbourne Storm |
| — | (New Zealand) | Slade Griffen | HK | Yet to Debut | (Australia) Melbourne Storm |
| — | (Australia) | Lucas Miller | HB, FE | Yet to Debut | (Australia) Melbourne Storm |
| — | (Australia) | Gerrard Tibbetts | SR, CE | Yet to Debut | (Australia) Melbourne Storm |
| — | (Republic of Ireland) | Rory Kostjasyn | HK, LK | Yet to Debut | (Australia) Melbourne Storm |
| — | (Tonga) | Andre Itula | FB, WG | Yet to Debut | (Australia) Melbourne Storm |
| — | (Italy) | Aidan Guerra | SR, LK | Yet to Debut | (Australia) Melbourne Storm |
| — | (Vanuatu) | Justin O'Neill | CE | Yet to Debut | (Australia) Melbourne Storm |

== 2009 NRL Grand Final Winning Team ==
Melbourne Storm
| 2009 Grand Final Winning Team | Interchange | Coach |
|---|---|---|
| 1 Billy Slater – FB; 2 Steve Turner – WG; 3 Will Chambers – CE; 4 Greg Inglis – CE; 5 Dane Neilsen – WG; 6 Brett Finch – FE; 7 Cooper Cronk – HB; 8 Aiden Tolman – PR; 9 Cameron Smith (c) – HK; 10 Brett White – PR; 11 Adam Blair – SR; 12 Ryan Hoffman – SR; 13 Dallas Johnson – LK | 14 Ryan Hinchcliffe; 15 Jeff Lima; 16 Ryan Tandy; 17 Scott Anderson | Head coach: Craig Bellamy; Legend: (c) Captain(s); (vc) Vice-captain(s) |

== Player movements ==
Losses

- Russell Aitken to AS Carcassonne
- Michael Crocker to ~~Hull F.C.~~→South Sydney Rabbitohs (Note: Crocker could not obtain a work permit to take up his contract with Hull FC and subsequently signed with South Sydney during the 2009 NRL season.)
- Israel Folau to Brisbane Broncos
- Liam Foran to New Zealand Warriors
- Matt Geyer to Retirement
- Antonio Kaufusi to North Queensland Cowboys
- Clifford Manua to Released
- Jeremy Smith to St George Illawarra Dragons
- Sam Tagataese to Gold Coast Titans

Gains

- Matthew Cross from Gold Coast Titans
- Brett Finch from Parramatta Eels (midseason)
- Ryan Hinchcliffe from Canberra Raiders
- Willie Isa from Penrith Panthers
- Wairangi Koopu from New Zealand Warriors
- James Maloney from Parramatta Eels
- Ryan Tandy from Wests Tigers

== Representative honours ==
This table lists all players who have played a representative match in 2009.

| Player | 2009 ANZAC Test | City vs Country Origin | State of Origin 1 | State of Origin 2 | State of Origin 3 | 2009 Four Nations |
|---|---|---|---|---|---|---|
| Adam Blair | New Zealand | —N/a | —N/a | —N/a | —N/a | New Zealand |
| Cooper Cronk | —N/a | —N/a | —N/a | —N/a | —N/a | Australia |
| Ryan Hoffman | —N/a | City | —N/a | —N/a | —N/a | Australia |
| Greg Inglis | Australia | —N/a | Queensland | Queensland | Queensland | Australia |
| Dallas Johnson | —N/a | —N/a | Queensland | Queensland | Queensland | —N/a |
| Jeff Lima | New Zealand | —N/a | —N/a | —N/a | —N/a | New Zealand |
| Sika Manu | New Zealand | —N/a | —N/a | —N/a | —N/a | —N/a |
| Billy Slater | Australia | —N/a | Queensland | Queensland | Queensland | Australia |
| Cameron Smith | Australia | —N/a | Queensland | Queensland | Queensland | Australia |
| Brett White | —N/a | Country | —N/a | —N/a | New South Wales | Australia |

== Statistics ==
This table contains playing statistics for all Melbourne Storm players to have played in the 2009 NRL season.

- Statistics sources:

| Name | Appearances | Tries | Goals | Field goals | Points |
|---|---|---|---|---|---|
| Brett Anderson | 2 | 3 | 0 | 0 | 12 |
| Scott Anderson | 18 | 0 | 0 | 0 | 0 |
| Adam Blair | 25 | 2 | 0 | 0 | 8 |
| Hep Cahill | 3 | 0 | 0 | 0 | 0 |
| Will Chambers | 27 | 12 | 0 | 0 | 48 |
| Cooper Cronk | 27 | 8 | 0 | 0 | 32 |
| Matthew Cross | 14 | 3 | 0 | 0 | 12 |
| Brett Finch | 20 | 3 | 0 | 0 | 12 |
| Ryan Hinchcliffe | 26 | 2 | 0 | 0 | 8 |
| Ryan Hoffman | 25 | 6 | 0 | 0 | 24 |
| Greg Inglis | 23 | 16 | 0 | 2 | 66 |
| Willie Isa | 2 | 0 | 0 | 0 | 0 |
| Dallas Johnson | 24 | 1 | 0 | 0 | 4 |
| Luke Kelly | 1 | 0 | 0 | 0 | 0 |
| Wairangi Koopu | 12 | 1 | 0 | 0 | 4 |
| Jeff Lima | 25 | 2 | 0 | 0 | 8 |
| James Maloney | 4 | 0 | 0 | 0 | 0 |
| Sika Manu | 10 | 0 | 0 | 0 | 0 |
| Dane Nielsen | 10 | 3 | 0 | 0 | 12 |
| Kevin Proctor | 7 | 1 | 0 | 0 | 4 |
| Anthony Quinn | 9 | 2 | 0 | 0 | 8 |
| Billy Slater | 26 | 18 | 0 | 0 | 72 |
| Cameron Smith | 25 | 3 | 65 | 0 | 142 |
| Ryan Tandy | 6 | 0 | 0 | 0 | 0 |
| Aiden Tolman | 27 | 3 | 0 | 0 | 12 |
| Joe Tomane | 15 | 10 | 17 | 0 | 74 |
| Steve Turner | 25 | 10 | 1 | 0 | 42 |
| Brett White | 21 | 1 | 0 | 0 | 4 |
| 28 players used | – | 110 | 83 | 2 | 608 |

=== Scorers ===
Most points in a game: 24 points

- Round 13 – Joe Tomane (3 tries, 6 goals) vs Brisbane Broncos

Most tries in a game: 4

- Qualifying Final – Billy Slater vs Manly Warringah Sea Eagles

=== Winning games ===
Highest score in a winning game: 48 points

- Round 13 vs Brisbane Broncos

Lowest score in a winning game: 14 points

- Round 15 vs Wests Tigers

Greatest winning margin: 42 points

- Round 13 vs Brisbane Broncos

Greatest number of games won consecutively: 5

- Round 25 – Grand Final

=== Losing games ===
Highest score in a losing game: 16 points

- Round 16 vs Canberra Raiders
- Round 19 vs Parramatta Eels
- Round 24 vs Manly Warringah Sea Eagles

Lowest score in a losing game: 6 points

- Round 4 vs Gold Coast Titans
- Round 6 vs Wests Tigers

Greatest losing margin: 16 points

- Round 11 vs Canterbury-Bankstown Bulldogs

Greatest number of games lost consecutively: 2

- Round 23 – Round 24

== NRL Under 20s ==
In the second season of the NRL's National Youth Championship, Melbourne were again coached by Brad Arthur finishing the regular season in third place on the ladder to qualify for the finals.

=== Ladder ===
| Pos | Team | Pld | W | D | L | B | PF | PA | PD | Pts | |
|---|---|---|---|---|---|---|---|---|---|---|---|
| 1 | Manly Warringah Sea Eagles (M) | 24 | 19 | 1 | 4 | 2 | 879 | 417 | +462 | 39 | Advance to finals series |
| 2 | St. George Illawarra Dragons | 24 | 19 | 0 | 5 | 2 | 758 | 461 | +297 | 38 | Advance to finals series |
| 3 | Melbourne Storm (P) | 24 | 19 | 0 | 5 | 2 | 833 | 597 | +236 | 38 | Advance to finals series |
| 4 | Wests Tigers | 24 | 15 | 1 | 8 | 2 | 709 | 588 | +121 | 31 | Advance to finals series |
| 5 | Brisbane Broncos | 24 | 15 | 0 | 9 | 2 | 698 | 551 | +147 | 30 | Advance to finals series |
| 6 | South Sydney Rabbitohs | 24 | 13 | 1 | 10 | 2 | 776 | 568 | +208 | 27 | Advance to finals series |
| 7 | New Zealand Warriors | 24 | 13 | 1 | 10 | 2 | 725 | 612 | +113 | 27 | Advance to finals series |
| 8 | Canberra Raiders | 24 | 11 | 2 | 11 | 2 | 706 | 685 | +21 | 24 | Advance to finals series |
| 9 | North Queensland Cowboys | 24 | 12 | 0 | 12 | 2 | 668 | 683 | −15 | 24 | |
| 10 | Newcastle Knights | 24 | 9 | 1 | 14 | 2 | 596 | 756 | −160 | 19 | |
| 11 | Canterbury Bulldogs | 24 | 9 | 1 | 14 | 2 | 649 | 867 | −218 | 19 | |
| 12 | Parramatta Eels | 24 | 8 | 0 | 16 | 2 | 604 | 698 | −94 | 16 | |
| 13 | Penrith Panthers | 24 | 8 | 0 | 16 | 2 | 573 | 755 | −182 | 16 | |
| 14 | Gold Coast Titans | 24 | 8 | 0 | 16 | 2 | 542 | 738 | −196 | 16 | |
| 15 | Sydney Roosters | 24 | 6 | 0 | 18 | 2 | 443 | 736 | −293 | 12 | |
| 16 | Cronulla-Sutherland Sharks (W) | 24 | 4 | 0 | 20 | 2 | 391 | 838 | −447 | 8 | |

Updated to match(es) played on 4 October 2009. Source: 2009 NYC Toyota Cup - RLP, 2009 NRL Under-20s season
(M) Minor premiers; (P) Premiers; (W) Wooden spoon

=== Finals ===
| Qualifying final 11 September 2009 | Melbourne Storm | 54–18 | South Sydney Rabbitohs | Etihad Stadium |
| 5:30pm AEST | Tries: Dane Chisholm (5); Justin O'Neill (2); Jesse Bromwich; Matt Duffie; Fred Makimare; Goals: Gareth Widdop 7/10 | | Tries: Jason Clark; Josh Mansour; Taioalo Vaivai; Goals: Adam Reynolds 3/3 | Referee: Gavin Reynolds |

| Preliminary final 26 September 2009 | Melbourne Storm | 40–16 | Brisbane Broncos | Etihad Stadium |
| 5:15pm AEST | Tries: Matt Duffie (3); Dane Chisholm (2); Jai Jones-Wiegold; Gareth Widdop; Goals: Gareth Widdop 6/7 | | Tries: Dane Gagai; Kurtis Lingwoodock; Mitch Rivett; Goals: Corey Norman 2/3 | Referee: Adam Devcich |

| Grand Final; 4 October 2009 | Melbourne Storm | 24–22 | Wests Tigers | ANZ Stadium |
| 2:10pm AEDT | Tries: Gareth Widdop (2); Matt Duffie; Justin O'Neill; Billy Rogers; Goals: Gareth Widdop 2/5 | | Tries: Jake Mullaney (2); Rhys Curran; Robert Lui; Goals: Jake Mullaney 3/4 | Referee: Gavin Reynolds |

=== 2009 NRL Under 20s Premiership Team ===
Melbourne Storm
| 2009 NRL Under 20s Premiership Team | Interchange | Coach |
|---|---|---|
| 1 Gareth Widdop – FB; 2 Sam Joe – WG; 3 Justin O'Neill – CE; 4 Pita Maile – CE; 5 Matt Duffie – WG; 6 Dane Chisholm – FE; 7 Luke Kelly (c) – HB; 8 Pulou Vaituutuu – PR; 9 James Woolford – HK; 10 Jesse Bromwich – PR; 11 Robbie Rochow – SR; 12 Theodore Stuart – SR; 13 Billy Rogers – LK | 14 Jai Jones-Wiegold; 15 Jordan McLean; 16 Kevin Proctor; 17 Fred Makimare | Head coach: Brad Arthur; Legend: (c) Captain(s); (vc) Vice-captain(s) |

=== Statistics ===
==== Scorers ====
Most points in a game: 20 points

- Round 2 – Gareth Widdop (2 tries, 6 goals) vs Brisbane Broncos
- Round 17 – Gareth Widdop (1 try, 8 goals) vs Newcastle Knights
- Round 20 – Gareth Widdop (2 tries, 6 goals) vs Cronulla-Sutherland Sharks

Most tries in a game: 5

- Qualifying Final – Dane Chisholm vs South Sydney Rabbitohs

Most points (season): 294

- Gareth Widdop (18 tries, 111 goals)

Most tries (season): 25

- Matt Duffie

==== Winning games ====
Highest score in a winning game: 54 points

- Round 11 vs Canterbury-Bankstown Bulldogs
- Qualifying Final vs South Sydney Rabbitohs

Lowest score in a winning game: 16 points

- Round 25 vs Sydney Roosters

Greatest winning margin: 36 points

- Qualifying Final vs South Sydney Rabbitohs

Greatest number of games won consecutively: 8

- Round 22 – Grand Final

==== Losing games ====
Highest score in a losing game: 34 points

- Round 16 vs Canberra Raiders

Lowest score in a losing game: 16 points

- Round 10 vs Canberra Raiders

Greatest losing margin: 12 points

- Round 21 vs St George Illawarra Dragons

Greatest number of games lost consecutively: 2

- Round 15 – Round 16

== S. G. Ball Cup ==
For the first time in club history, Melbourne entered a junior representative team in the New South Wales Rugby League under-18s competition S. G. Ball Cup.

Coached by club high performance manager Kim Williams, the team finished the regular season in fourth place, winning six of their nine matches. During the finals, the team stunned more fancied rivals, defeating Illawarra 50–10, Newcastle 22–16, and Manly 28–14 to progress to the competition's Grand Final against Canterbury-Bankstown Bulldogs.

| Grand Final; 7 May 2009 | Canterbury-Bankstown Bulldogs | 42–16 | Melbourne Storm | St Marys Leagues Stadium |
| 3:00pm AEST | Tries: Lachlan Burr (3); Richard Irwin; Aiden Sezer; Liam Ayoub; Ali Hijazi; Goals: Ali Hijazi (7) | | Tries: Slade Griffin (2); Robbie Kurth; Goals: John Aldridge (2) | Referee: Daniel Olford |

== Feeder Team ==
For a second successive season, Melbourne sent their back-up players to play with Central Coast Storm, coached by former Storm player Jamie Feeney.

Central Coast made the finals, finishing in second position (out of 11 teams), behind eventual premiers Bankstown City Bulls. Central Coast were eliminated from the NSW Cup finals after successive defeats against Western Suburbs and Balmain Ryde-Eastwood.

Rory Kostjasyn would be awarded the team's player of the year award, with Storm teammate Hep Cahill named as best forward, while Dane Nielsen and James Maloney shared the honours as best backs.

2009 New South Wales Cup
| Pos | Team | Pld | W | D | L | PF | PA | PD | Pts |
|---|---|---|---|---|---|---|---|---|---|
| 2 | Central Coast Storm | 20 | 13 | 1 | 6 | 526 | 462 | +64 | 31 |

== Awards ==
=== Trophy Cabinet ===
- 2009 Provan-Summons Trophy
- 2009 National Youth Competition Toyota Cup

=== Melbourne Storm Awards Night ===
- Melbourne Storm Player of the Year: Billy Slater
- Members' Player of the Year: Billy Slater
- Best Back: Greg Inglis
- Best Forward: Cameron Smith
- Rookie of the Year: Kevin Proctor
- Most Improved: Aiden Tolman
- Best Try: Will Chambers v Canberra Raiders (Round 16)
- Greatest Hit: Adam Blair v Manly (Round 24)
- Darren Bell U20s Player of the Year Award: Gareth Widdop
- U20s Most Improved: Jai Jones
- U20s Best Forward: Jesse Bromwich
- U20s Best Back: Luke Kelly
- Mick Moore Club Person of the Year: Troy Thomson
- Greg Brentnall Young Achievers Trophy: Lucas Grech
- Community Award: Steve Turner
- Life Member Inductee: Cameron Smith
- U18 SG Ball Player of the Year: Slade Griffin

=== Dally M Awards Night ===
- Dally M Representative Player of the Year: Greg Inglis

=== Rugby League World Golden Boot Awarda Night ===
- Golden Boot Award: Greg Inglis

=== RLPA Awards Night ===
- RLPA Australia Representative Player of the Year: Greg Inglis

=== RLIF Awards ===
- RLIF Coach of the Year: Craig Bellamy
- RLIF Centre of the Year: Greg Inglis
- RLIF Hooker of the Year: Cameron Smith

=== Additional Awards ===
- Clive Churchill Medal: Billy Slater
- Wally Lewis Medal: Greg Inglis
- QRL Ron McAuliffe Medal: Greg Inglis
- Rugby League Four Nations Player of the Series: Greg Inglis
- Jack Gibson Medal: Luke Kelly
- Sprit of ANZAC Medal: Adam Blair
- New Zealand Kiwis Player of the Year: Adam Blair
