= Jay Hoffman (rugby league) =

Australian rugby league footballer

Personal information
- Full name: James Francis Hoffman
- Born: 20 January 1958 (age 68) Casino, New South Wales, Australia

Playing information
- Height: 173 cm (5 ft 8 in)
- Weight: 73 kg (11 st 7 lb)
- Position: Hooker
Club
Years	Team	Pld	T	G	FG	P
	Brothers (Brisbane)
1982–87	Canberra Raiders	111	9	0	0	35
	Total	111	9	0	0	35
Representative
Years	Team	Pld	T	G	FG	P
1979–80	Queensland	3	0	0	0	0
- Source: NRL Stats
- Relatives: Ryan Hoffman (son)

Jay Hoffman (born 20 January 1958) is an Australian former professional rugby league footballer who played in the 1970s and 1980s. He played for the Canberra Raiders in the New South Wales Rugby League (NSWRL) competition, primarily as a hooker. He is the father of the rugby league footballer; Ryan Hoffman.

Prior to his move to Canberra, Hoffman played for Brisbane's Past Brothers in the Brisbane Rugby League. While playing for Brothers, Hoffman was selected to represent Queensland for three matches. In 1979, he played for the state against New South Wales and Great Britain, and in 1980 against New South Wales in one of the non-State of Origin matches.

In 1983 and 1985, Hoffman was awarded the Clubman of the Year at Canberra.

== Sources ==
- Alan Whiticker & Glen Hudson (2007). The Encyclopedia of Rugby League Players. Wetherill Park, New South Wales: Gary Allen Pty Ltd. p. 242. ISBN 978-1-877082-93-1.
- Gary Lester, ed. (1983). The Sun Book of Rugby League - 1983. Sydney: John Fairfax Marketing. p. 16. ISBN 0-909558-83-3.
