= Craig Bellamy (rugby league) =

Australian rugby league footballer and coach

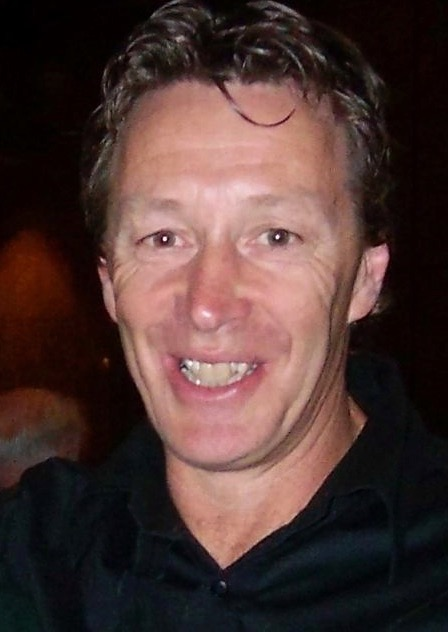

Personal information
- Born: 3 October 1958 (age 68) (Note: The Canberra Times reported in 1987 that Bellamy's date of birth is 3 October 1959. This is consistent with web archives of the Melbourne Storm's website dating back to 2005. However, Bellamy stated at a media event on 3 October 2024 that it was his 66th birthday, indicating a birth year of 1958. The Melbourne Storm's website, since at least 2019, has listed Bellamy's date of birth as 2 October 1959, but this date of birth not supported by any other sources.) Portland, New South Wales, Australia
- Height: 175 cm (5 ft 9 in)

Playing information
- Position: Centre, Five-eighth, Lock
Club
Years	Team	Pld	T	G	FG	P
1982–92	Canberra Raiders	150	46	0	0	175
1991	Swinton	14	0	0	0	0
	Total	164	46	0	0	175

Coaching information
Club
Years	Team	Gms	W	D	L	W%
2002	Brisbane Broncos	2	1	0	1	50
2003–	Melbourne Storm	609	415	2	184	68
	Total	611	416	2	185	68
Representative
Years	Team	Gms	W	D	L	W%
2005–07	Country Origin	3	1	0	2	33
2008–10	New South Wales	9	2	0	7	22
- Source: As of 6 July 2025

Craig Bellamy (born 3 October 1958) is an Australian professional rugby league football coach who is the head coach of the Melbourne Storm in the National Rugby League (NRL), and a former professional rugby league footballer.

He has previously coached the New South Wales State of Origin team. Bellamy started his coaching career as assistant coach to Wayne Bennett at the Brisbane Broncos. He also writes a column for The Australian.

Bellamy played his entire NSWRL premiership career with the Canberra Raiders during the 1980s, and 1990s. In Canberra he played under the coaches Don Furner (1982–87), Wayne Bennett (1987), and Tim Sheens (1988–92). Injury midway through the 1987 season saw Bellamy miss the Raiders charge to their first ever Grand Final appearance which resulted in an 18–8 loss to the Manly-Warringah Sea Eagles. Bellamy played from the bench in Canberra's 18–14 win over Penrith in the 1990 Grand Final at the Sydney Football Stadium.

After a coaching apprenticeship as Wayne Bennett's assistant at the Brisbane Broncos, which included a win over the Wests Tigers with the "Baby Broncos" when Bennett and the teams stars were away on State of Origin duty. Bellamy was appointed head coach of the Melbourne Storm for the 2003 NRL season. There he has achieved great success; winning the 2007 Grand Final over Manly and the 2009 Grand Final over Parramatta, though both of these were later stripped due to extensive salary cap breaches. He also led the Storm to the minor premiership in 2011, and won his first legitimate premiership as a coach in 2012 when the Storm defeated the Canterbury-Bankstown Bulldogs. He was the coach of the New South Wales State of Origin team until he was sacked in 2010, the same year as the Storm's salary cap scandal, after three unrelenting seasons of disappointment which netted only two wins from nine matches.

Bellamy won his second recognised NRL premiership as coach with the Melbourne Storm after a dominant 2017 season in which the Storm lost only four games. In 2018, the Storm had a successful year making it to the 2018 NRL Grand Final before being beaten by the Sydney Roosters. He won his third NRL premiership with the Storm in 2020.

Bellamy is one of the most successful coaches in NRL history, with the highest win percentage of any full-time coach in the modern era. Of his 24 seasons with the Melbourne, the longest consecutive stint by a coach at a single club, 23 were winning seasons with a win–loss ratio above 50%, only falling short in 2026. Melbourne have played finals football every year since Bellamy began coaching the side except 2010, where the club would have placed fifth on the ladder had they not been penalised for a salary cap breach, and 2026. He has also never lost in round one of a season as coach.

== Background ==
Bellamy was born and raised in Portland, New South Wales, Australia. His childhood nickname was 'Ned' because he was "as wild as Ned Kelly."

When Bellamy was a young adult, his father Norm died in a workplace accident.

== Playing career ==
He played his early junior football for Portland Colts. Bellamy also played for Oberon Tigers in the Country Rugby League as a teenager before moving to Macquarie United in the Newcastle Rugby League in 1979.

The Canberra Raiders signed Bellamy in their debut season, 1982. He played the majority of his career in the centres but was also used as a utility player, appearing at times as fullback, winger, five-eighth and lock. After the Raiders won the 1989 NSWRL season's Grand Final (which he wasn't selected for), Bellamy travelled with the Raiders to England for the 1989 World Club Challenge, but didn't play in the loss to Widnes at Old Trafford.

After winning the 1990 premiership with the Raiders, Bellamy spent 1991 with Turvey Park in Wagga Wagga as captain/coach in the Group 9 Competition, he was also the Riverina Rugby League Captain and also had a stint playing in England for Swinton, before returning to Canberra for one last year in 1992.

== Coaching career ==
=== 1990s ===
In 1995, Bellamy coached the Canberra Raiders' Presidents Cup team to a premiership win. In 1997 he became performance co-ordinator and assistant coach to Wayne Bennett at the Brisbane Broncos. That year they won the 1998 NRL Grand final.

=== 2000s ===
In 2002, when Broncos' head coach Wayne Bennett was on State of Origin duty with the Queensland Maroons, Bellamy gained NRL experience as a head coach. Forced to field a team full of young players due to the regular side's representative commitments, the 'Baby Broncos' upset the Wests Tigers. The Tigers were a leading candidate to sign Bellamy as their coach for the 2003 season, although he ultimately joined Melbourne after Mark Murray was sacked. In his third season as an NRL coach with the Storm, Bellamy started coaching the Country Origin team with a loss in 2005. He coached New South Wales Country to victory and his club, Melbourne won the 2006 minor premiership and reached the 2006 National Rugby League grand final, but finished as runners-up to former mentor Bennett's Brisbane Broncos. In the post season Bellamy continued as Kangaroos assistant coach, now under Ricky Stuart for the 2006 Tri Nations series. The following season Country lost but the Storm were minor premiers and reached the 2007 NRL grand final, in which they defeated the Manly Warringah Sea Eagles 34–8 to become premiers. They were however later stripped of the title by the NRL.

In April, 2008, Bellamy signed a five-year contract extension through to 2013 with Melbourne despite interest from the Brisbane Broncos. This signing meant that Bellamy would become the first 10-year coach in the Storm's history. After the New South Wales Blues' poor showing in the 2007 State of Origin series, Bellamy was appointed as coach for the 2008 series. In his first series in charge of NSW, the Blues lost to Mal Meninga's Maroons 2 – 1. The second and third series have also resulted in series losses, therefore posing serious questions on Bellamy's abilities to coach at representative level.

During the finals campaign of the 2008 NRL season, Bellamy cost his club $50,000 after he was fined for disclosing scathing remarks and views on the NRL's decision to suspend his side's captain and goal-kicker, Cameron Smith over a controversial "grapple tackle" on Brisbane's Sam Thaiday. Bellamy claimed that the administration was corrupt and that bookkeepers already knew that Smith would be denied the opportunity to play for the rest of the season and furthermore along with Melbourne's CEO questioned the NRL's integrity in their opting to side-line Smith and not others who were guilty of committing similar tackles. This drew threats of legal action from the members of the NRL Judiciary.

Bellamy coached Melbourne to their 3rd successive NRL grand final, but could not repeat the feats of the previous year as his side suffered an enormous 40–0 defeat to Manly.

2009 marked the fourth consecutive year Melbourne played in the grand final under Bellamy. Melbourne also reached the top four on the NRL ladder for the fourth consecutive year. Craig Bellamy coached Melbourne in their grand final win in 2009 only to be stripped of the title due to breaching the salary cap.

Bellamy was named coach of the year at the 2009 RLIF awards.

=== 2010s ===
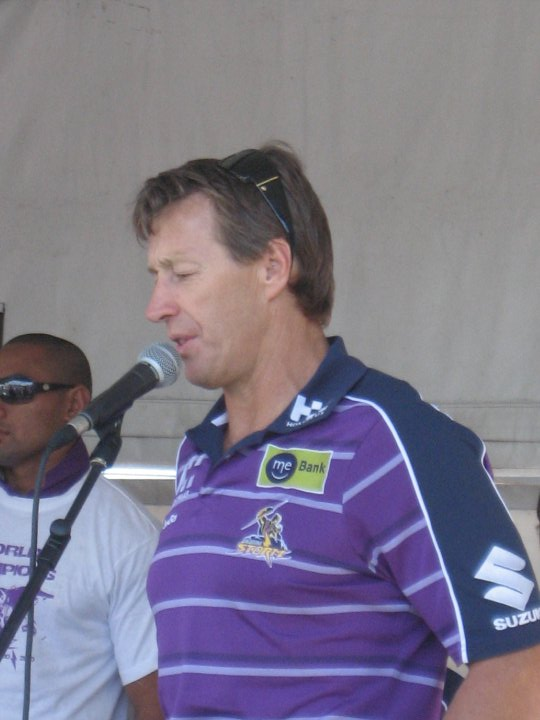
Bellamy in 2010

Bellamy left as Blues coach after the 2010 State of Origin series which resulted in a 3-0 whitewash, the first in Origin and also the Blues' first since 2000. Ricky Stuart was later named his successor. So far the Storm had not missed the finals in Bellamy's seven seasons at the helm with the exception of 2010 when they were not allowed to earn any points due to their 2009 salary cap breach. Had they been allowed to accumulate points however they would have made the top 8 again. He took them to the minor premiership in 2011, just narrowly missing out on a spot in the grand final to a loss in the preliminary final to the New Zealand Warriors. He went one better in 2012, winning the 2012 NRL grand final against Canterbury 14–4. That year he also received the Rugby League International Federation's coach of the year award for the second time.

Despite speculation he would move to the Warriors or St George-Illawarra as coach, he signed a new three-year deal with Melbourne Storm in early 2013. He coached the team to victory in the 2013 World Club Challenge over Leeds, earning the title of world champions. Late in the 2013 NRL season during an interview with Paul Vautin for Channel 9's "The Footy show", it was revealed that Bellamy was an electrician by trade, though downplayed it by saying that he was "not a very good one." Also during 2013 Bellamy's book, Home Truths: On Life, Leadership, Adversity, Success and Failure was published.

On 16 May 2014 Bellamy reached a milestone, and created a new club record, of having coached the Melbourne Storm for 300 games.

On 4 March 2016, Bellamy extended his stay as Melbourne Storm coach to the end of 2018.

=== 2020s ===
Bellamy had coached the Melbourne Storm to yet another NRL Premiership title in 2020, defeating the Penrith Panthers 26–20. This was despite the impact of the COVID-19 pandemic, which had his players living away from home for five months straight. In the 2021 NRL season, Bellamy guided Melbourne to 19 consecutive wins throughout the regular season as the club claimed another minor premiership. The win streak equalled the Eastern Suburbs team of the 1970s. Melbourne would however suffer a shock loss against Penrith in the preliminary final. In the 2022 NRL season, Melbourne would qualify for the finals but were eliminated in the first week by Canberra. In the 2023 NRL season, Bellamy guided Melbourne to a third-placed finish. The club would reach the preliminary final but were convincingly beaten by Penrith 38–4.

=== 2024 ===
On May 10, 2024, Bellamy re-signed as coach of Melbourne for the 2025 season. Bellamy guided Melbourne to the minor premiership at the conclusion of the 2024 regular season. The club would eventually reach the grand final but were defeated by Penrith 14-6

=== 2025 ===
On 5 June, Melbourne announced that Bellamy had re-signed with the club for the 2026 season. Bellamy guided Melbourne to a second-placed finish in the 2025 NRL season and eventually the 2025 NRL Grand Final where they squandered a 22-12 half-time lead against Brisbane to lose the match 26–22.

=== 2026 ===
On 6 February 2026, the Storm announced that Bellamy had re-signed as coach until the end of the 2028 season. In the 2026 NRL season, Bellamy failed to qualify Melbourne for the finals which was the first time the club had missed out since 2002. During the early part of the season, Melbourne lost a club record seven straight matches.

== Coaching career ==
Commentator Paul Kent describes how Bellamy transforms "journeymen footballers into accomplished players.".

Coach, commentator and rugby league administrator Phil Gould stated:

Melbourne’s military-like, mechanical, meticulous and clinical form of rugby league excellence, not only wins a lot of games; it stands up under pressure; it teaches individuals within the team to stand up; it makes good players of average players; great players of good players; it turns great players into champions . Basically, it produces championship teams.

=== Statistics ===
Craig Bellamy – coaching results by season
Year	Team	Games	Wins	Draws	Losses	Win %	Notes
2002	Brisbane Broncos	2	1	0	1	50%	Coached two games while Wayne Bennett was on Origin duty
2003	Melbourne Storm	26	16	0	10	62%	Lost 2003 NRL Semi Final against Canterbury Bulldogs
2004	Melbourne Storm	26	14	0	12	54%	Lost 2004 NRL Semi Final against Canterbury Bulldogs
2005	Melbourne Storm	26	14	0	12	54%	Lost 2005 NRL Semi Final against North Queensland Cowboys
2006	Melbourne Storm	27	22	0	5	81%	Lost 2006 NRL Grand Final against Brisbane Broncos
2007*	Melbourne Storm	27	24	0	3	89%	Won 2007 NRL Grand Final against Manly-Warringah Sea Eagles
2008	Melbourne Storm	28	19	0	9	68%	Lost 2008 NRL Grand Final against Manly-Warringah Sea Eagles
2009*	Melbourne Storm	27	17	1	9	65%	Won 2009 NRL Grand Final against Parramatta Eels
2010	Melbourne Storm	24	14	0	10	58%	Finished 16th (out of 16) due to penalties from long-term salary cap breaches
2011	Melbourne Storm	26	20	0	6	77%	Lost 2011 NRL Preliminary Final against New Zealand Warriors
2012^	Melbourne Storm	27	20	0	7	74%	Won 2012 NRL Grand Final against Canterbury-Bankstown Bulldogs
2013	Melbourne Storm	26	16	1	9	64%	Lost 2013 NRL Semi Final against Newcastle Knights
2014	Melbourne Storm	25	14	0	11	56%	Knocked out in Elimination final match by Canterbury-Bankstown Bulldogs
2015	Melbourne Storm	26	15	0	11	58%	Lost 2015 NRL Preliminary final against North Queensland Cowboys
2016	Melbourne Storm	27	21	0	6	78%	Lost 2016 NRL Grand Final against Cronulla-Sutherland Sharks
2017^	Melbourne Storm	27	23	0	4	85%	Won 2017 NRL Grand Final against North Queensland Cowboys
2018	Melbourne Storm	27	18	0	9	67%	Lost 2018 NRL Grand Final against Sydney Roosters
2019	Melbourne Storm	27	21	0	6	78%	Lost 2019 Preliminary Final against Sydney Roosters
2020^	Melbourne Storm	23	19	0	4	83%	Won 2020 NRL Grand Final against Penrith Panthers
2021	Melbourne Storm	26	22	0	4	85%	Lost 2021 Preliminary Final against Penrith Panthers
2022	Melbourne Storm	25	15	0	10	60%	Knocked out in Elimination final match by Canberra Raiders
2023	Melbourne Storm	27	17	0	10	62%	Lost 2023 NRL Preliminary Final match by Penrith Panthers
2024	Melbourne Storm	27	21	0	6	78%	Lost 2024 NRL Grand Final against Penrith Panthers
2025	Melbourne Storm	27	19	0	8	70%	Lost 2025 NRL Grand Final against Brisbane Broncos
2026	Melbourne Storm	24	11	0	13	46%	Finished tenth, missing the finals.
Career		630	433	2	195	68.7%	

Key
^	Club won NRL Premiership
*	Club stripped of NRL Premiership

== Personal life ==
In 2026, Bellamy was diagnosed with an undisclosed Neurodegenerative disorder.

== Sources ==
- Alan Whiticker & Glen Hudson (2007). The Encyclopedia of Rugby League Players. Wetherill Park, New South Wales: Gary Allen Pty Ltd. p. 32. ISBN 978-1-877082-93-1.

Sporting positions
Preceded by Graham Murray; 2006–2007	Coach New South Wales; 2008–2010	Succeeded by Ricky Stuart; 2011–2012
Preceded by Mark Murray; 2001–2002	Coach Melbourne Storm; 2003–present	Succeeded by Incumbent
