= Aiden Tolman =

Australian rugby league footballer

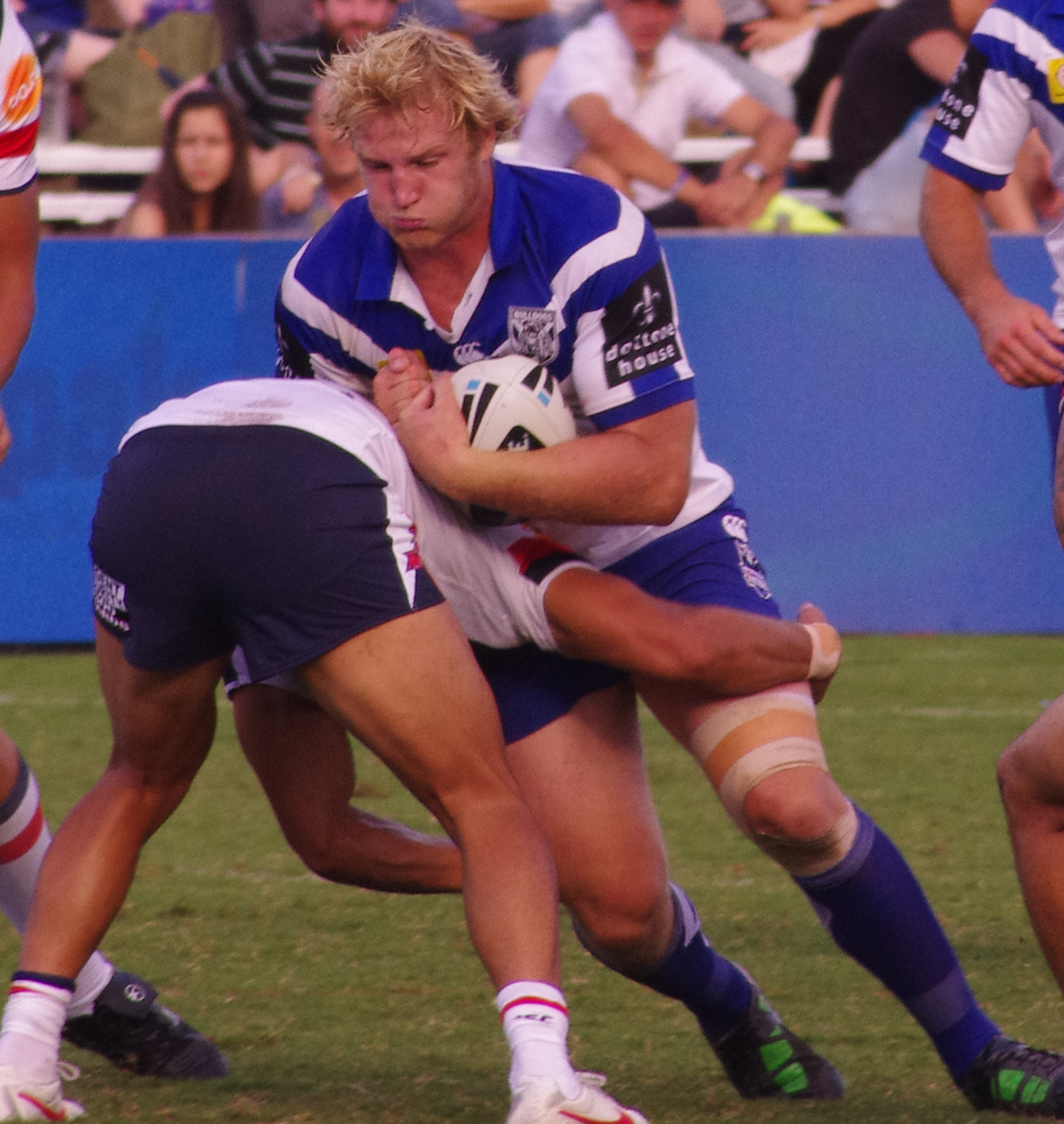

Personal information
- Born: 10 November 1988 (age 37) Kempsey, New South Wales, Australia
- Height: 183 cm (6 ft 0 in)
- Weight: 102 kg (16 st 1 lb)

Playing information
- Position: Prop
Club
Years	Team	Pld	T	G	FG	P
2008–10	Melbourne Storm	53	4	0	0	16
2011–20	Canterbury Bulldogs	222	10	0	0	40
2021–22	Cronulla Sharks	42	2	0	0	8
	Total	317	16	0	0	64
Representative
Years	Team	Pld	T	G	FG	P
2011–14	NSW Country	3	0	0	0	0
- Source: As of 17 September 2022

Aiden Tolman (born 10 November 1988) is an Australian former professional rugby league footballer who last played as a prop for the Cronulla-Sutherland Sharks in the NRL. He previously played for the Melbourne Storm and the Canterbury-Bankstown Bulldogs in the National Rugby League, and played at representative level for NSW Country. On 25 August 2022, Tolman announced he was retiring at the end of the season.

== Early life ==
Tolman was born in Kempsey, New South Wales, Australia. He was educated at St Paul's College, Kempsey and represented 2006 Australian Schoolboys. He has also played for the Junior Kangaroos. He played his junior football with the Smithtown Tigers and has also played for the Central Coast Storm and the Queensland Cup side, Norths Devils.

=== Melbourne (2008–2010) ===
Tolman made his first-grade debut for Melbourne Storm against the Canberra Raiders in round 6 of the 2008 season. He has been compared to former Melbourne Storm player Robbie Kearns. In 2008 he was named the Melbourne Storm rookie of the year. He also played in the 2009 premiership against Parramatta, however the premiership was later stripped in 2010 by the NRL due to the club's multiple and deliberate breaches of the salary cap between 2006 and 2010.

=== Canterbury-Bankstown (2011–2020) ===
On 18 May 2010, Tolman signed for the Canterbury-Bankstown Bulldogs for three years. In round one of the 2011 NRL season, he made his debut for the Bulldogs against the West Tigers at ANZ Stadium; he finished the season with 21 appearances and six tries. In 2012, he ended the season with 27 appearances and 3 tries. He achieved the coach's award for the club. Tolman played for Canterbury in the 2012 NRL Grand Final loss against his former club Melbourne at ANZ Stadium.

The Canterbury-Bankstown Bulldogs re-signed Tolman for a further four years, through until the end of season 2017. For the second year in a row, he once again received the coach's award from coach Des Hasler; he finished the season with 25 appearances and a try. Tolman played in Canterbury's 2014 NRL Grand Final loss against the South Sydney Rabbitohs; he finished the season with 22 appearances and a try. Because the club qualified for the finals, Tolman played 21 games for Canterbury in the 2015 NRL season. He played in both of Canterbury's finals matches as the club reached the second week but were eliminated by the Sydney Roosters.

On 6 December 2016, Tolman re-signed with Canterbury which would see him at the club until 2020. On 27 May 2017, he made 51 tackles, 17 hit ups for 148 running meters, and played 80 minutes, in round 12 against the Cronulla-Sutherland Sharks. Tolman made a total of 24 appearances for Canterbury-Bankstown in the 2017 NRL season as they failed to reach the finals for the first time since 2011.

In 2018, Tolman made 16 appearances for Canterbury as the club endured one of its toughest seasons on the field. At one stage of the season, Canterbury were sitting second last on the table but rallied to achieve upset victories over the Brisbane Broncos, New Zealand Warriors and St George to finish the season in 12th place. In round 15, he made his 250th first grade appearance against Cronulla-Sutherland at ANZ Stadium which ended in a 14–12 victory to Canterbury-Bankstown. In round 20 against the Penrith Panthers, he played his 200th game for Canterbury – just the 12th Canterbury player to do so – and achieved in inside of nine seasons.

Tolman made a total of 23 appearances for Canterbury in the 2019 NRL season as the club finished 12th on the table. At one stage, Canterbury-Bankstown found themselves sitting last on the table and in real danger of finishing with the wooden spoon. However, for the third straight season, Canterbury achieved four upset victories in a row over Penrith, the Wests Tigers, South Sydney and Parramatta who were all competing for a place in the finals series and were higher on the table. Pay was credited with the late season revival as the side focused heavily on defense. In 2020, Tolman made 17 appearances for Canterbury as the club again endured one of its toughest seasons on the field. On 22 September, he was told by Canterbury that his services would not be required in 2021 and that he would be released by the club, making him one of eight players who were told they would be released as Canterbury looked to rebuild after a horror year on and off the field.

=== Cronulla-Sutherland (2021–2022) ===
In November 2020, Tolman signed a deal to join Cronulla-Sutherland for the 2021 NRL season. In round 1 of the season, he made his club debut for the Cronulla-Sutherland in their 32–18 victory over the St. George Illawarra Dragons; he played 45 minutes off the bench, running for 134 meters. In round 16, Tolman scored his first try for Cronulla-Sutherland during a 26–18 upset loss to the Brisbane Broncos. He played 21 games for Cronulla in the 2021 NRL season which saw the club narrowly miss the finals by finishing 9th on the table.

In round 4 of the 2022 NRL season, Tolman played his 300th first grade game for Cronulla in an 18–0 victory over the Newcastle Knights. Tolman scored the first try of the match. On 25 August, Tolman announced he was retiring at the end of the season.

== Statistics ==
=== NRL ===
Season	Team	Matches	T	G	GK %	F/G	Pts
2008	Melbourne Storm	7	0	0	—	0	0
2009	Melbourne Storm	27	3	0	—	0	12
2010	Melbourne Storm	19	1	0/1	0.00%	0	4
2011	Canterbury-Bankstown	22	1	0	—	0	4
2012	Canterbury-Bankstown	27	1	0	—	0	4
2013	Canterbury-Bankstown	25	1	0	—	0	4
2014	Canterbury-Bankstown	22	2	0	—	0	8
2015	Canterbury-Bankstown	21	1	0	—	0	4
2016	Canterbury-Bankstown	25	1	0	—	0	4
2017	Canterbury-Bankstown	24	1	0	—	0	4
2018	Canterbury-Bankstown	16	0	0	—	0	0
2019	Canterbury-Bankstown	23	0	0	—	0	0
2020	Canterbury-Bankstown	17	2	0	—	0	8
2021	Cronulla-Sutherland	21	1	0	—	0	4
2022	Cronulla-Sutherland	21	1	0	—	0	4
Career totals		317	16	0/1	0.00%	0	64

=== City vs Country ===
Season	Team	Matches	T	G	GK %	F/G	Pts
2011	NSW Country	1	0	0	—	0	0
2013	NSW Country	1	0	0	—	0	0
2014	NSW Country	1	0	0	—	0	0
Career totals		3	0	0	—	0	0
