= Ryan Hoffman =

Australia international rugby league footballer

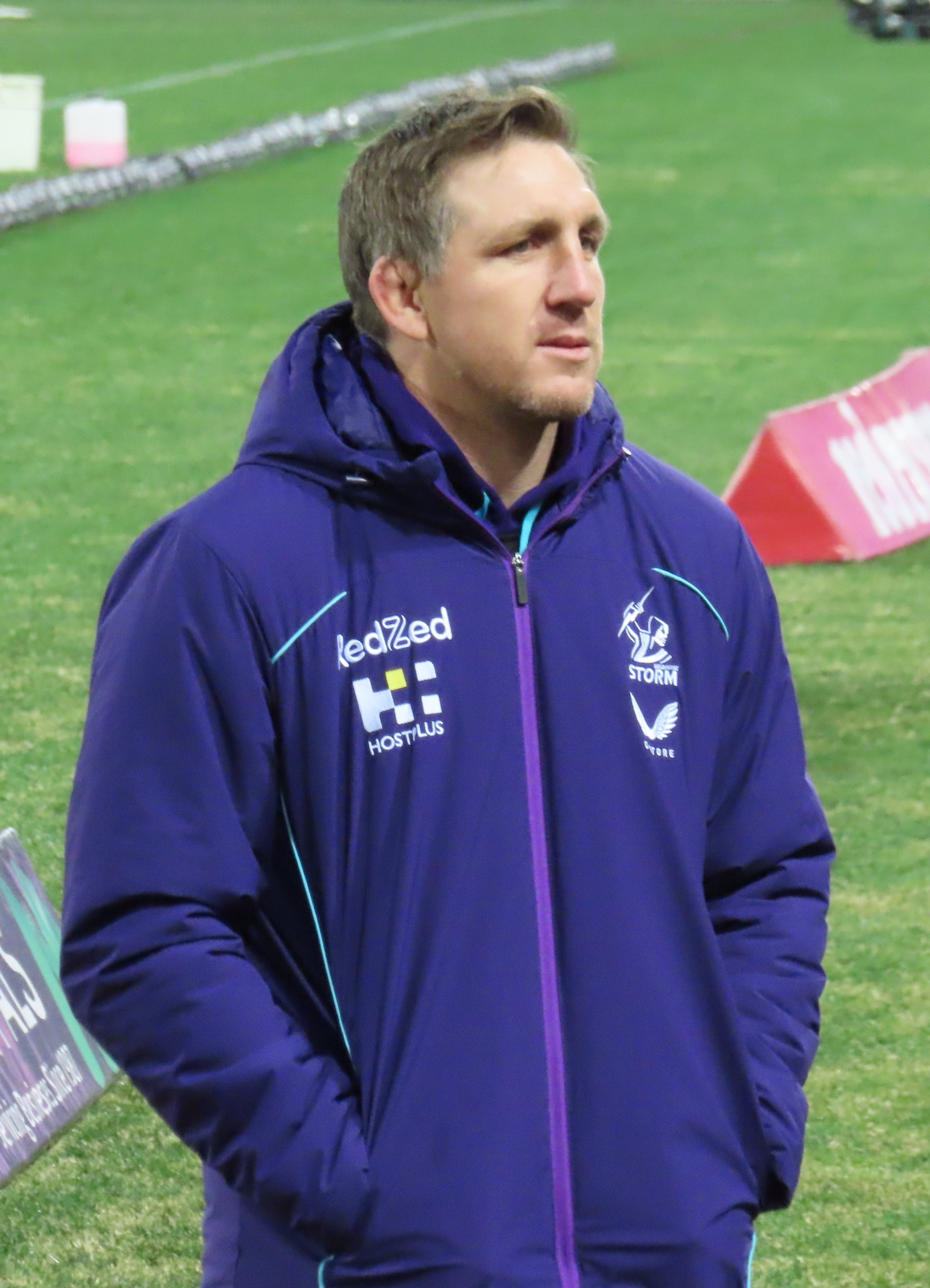

Personal information
- Full name: Ryan Jay Hoffman
- Born: 26 January 1984 (age 42) Canberra, ACT, Australia
- Height: 192 cm (6 ft 4 in)
- Weight: 103 kg (16 st 3 lb)

Playing information
- Position: Second-row
Club
Years	Team	Pld	T	G	FG	P
2003–10	Melbourne Storm	170	41	0	0	164
2011	Wigan Warriors	34	11	0	0	44
2012–14	Melbourne Storm	75	18	0	0	72
2015–17	New Zealand Warriors	60	10	1	0	42
2018	Melbourne Storm	20	2	0	0	8
	Total	359	82	1	0	330
Representative
Years	Team	Pld	T	G	FG	P
2006–14	NSW City	7	1	0	0	4
2007–15	New South Wales	14	0	0	0	0
2007–14	Australia	6	0	0	0	0
2014	Prime Minister's XIII	1	0	0	0	0
- Source: As of 16 December 2023
- Education: St Gregory's College
- Father: Jay Hoffman

Ryan Hoffman (born 26 January 1984) is an Australian former professional rugby league footballer who played in the 2000s and 2010s. He played for Melbourne Storm and the New Zealand Warriors in the National Rugby League, and the Wigan Warriors in the Super League, as a second-row.

== Early life ==
Hoffman was born in Canberra, Australian Capital Territory. His father, Jay Hoffman, played professional football for the Canberra Raiders with Ryan’s future Melbourne Storm coach Craig Bellamy, representing Queensland in the pre-Origin era.

Hoffman attended the renowned rugby league school St Gregory's College in Campbelltown, New South Wales.

== Club career ==
=== Melbourne Storm (2003–2010) ===
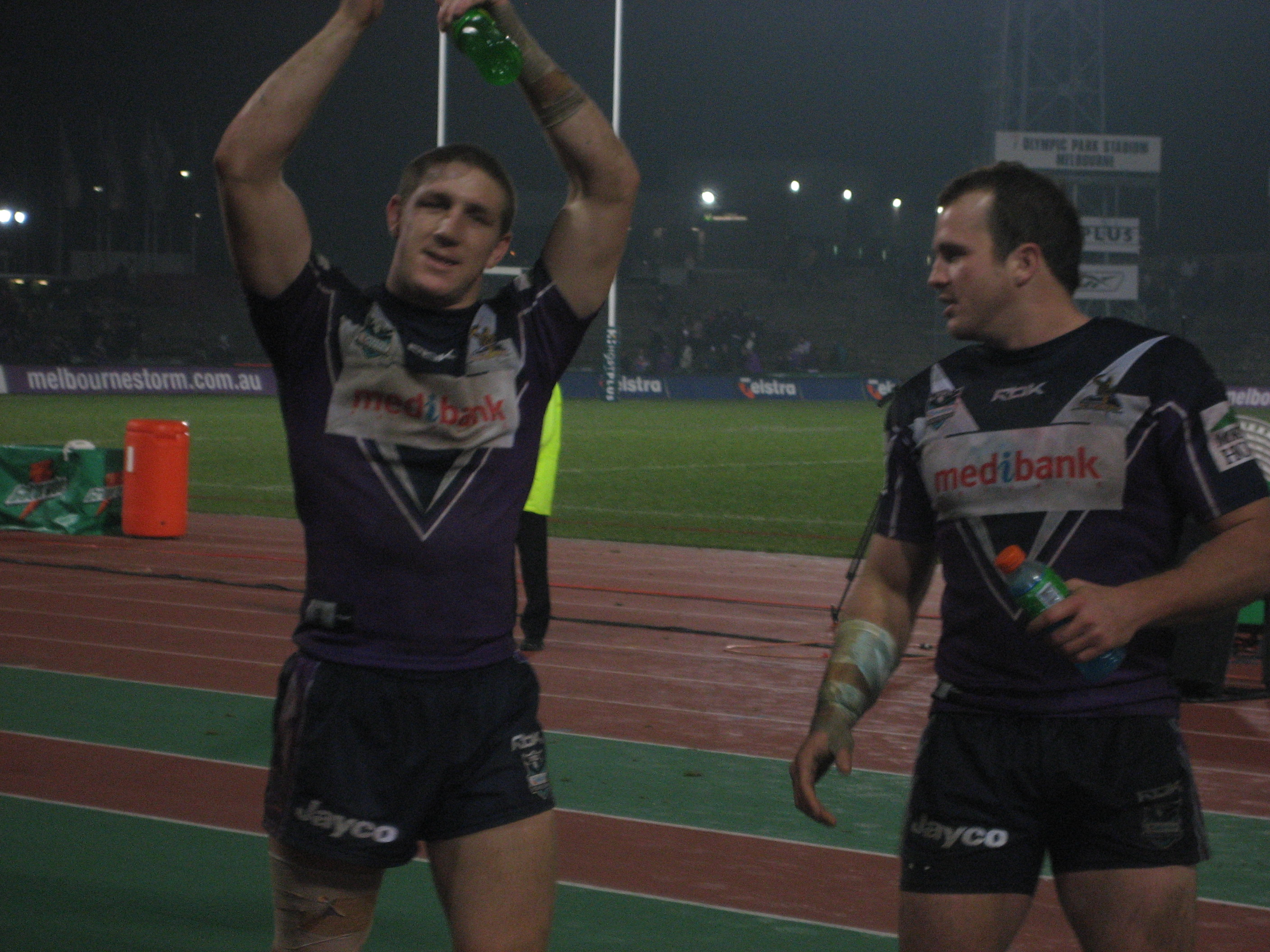
Hoffman and Clint Newton in 2007 celebrating after a win for Melbourne

Hoffman started his NRL career with the Melbourne Storm in 2003. In 2006, his improving form led to him being selected for the New South Wales City Origin side for the first time. It also earned him the Storm's Forward of the Year award. In addition, he was named in the second row for Melbourne Storm's team of the decade.

Following the 2006 NRL Grand Final loss to the Brisbane Broncos, Hoffman sat in the middle of Telstra Stadium in tears, an image which was printed in newspapers all around Australia.

In 2007, Hoffman was part of the Melbourne team which won the Grand Final, defeating Manly by 34–8. He played in the 2009 NRL Grand Final victory over the Parramatta Eels, scoring the opening try. In 2010, both premierships which Hoffman won with Melbourne were stripped due to the club's breaches of the salary cap between 2006 and 2010.

=== Wigan Warriors (2011) ===
In July 2010, Hoffman signed with Super League club Wigan Warriors, where he was given the #16 shirt and replaced Phil Bailey at second-row.

Hoffman scored on his first-grade début for the side at the season-opening Magic Weekend event against the club's rivals, St Helens R.F.C.

He then featured in the 2011 World Club Challenge where Wigan lost 15–21 to St George Illawarra Dragons in their first home game of the season.

In rounds 4 and 5, Hoffman scored a try apiece against Hull F.C. and Huddersfield Giants respectively. Another try at Hull Kingston Rovers in Round 9 made his record four tries from ten starting games for Wigan.

Hoffman played in the 2011 Challenge Cup Final victory over the Leeds Rhinos at Wembley Stadium, playing as a second-row forward, helping the side to defeat Leeds 28–18.

=== Melbourne Storm (2012–2014) ===
Hoffman signed a new deal to return to the NRL and the Melbourne Storm in 2012. Midseason, he captained the team for four games in the absence of Cameron Smith, becoming the 18th player to captain the club. He played in their 2012 Premiership victory over Canterbury-Bankstown, scoring the first try of the game.

He set up the first try for teammate Billy Slater in the 2013 World Club Challenge victory over Leeds.

=== New Zealand Warriors (2015–2017) ===
On 7 May 2014, Hoffman announced that he had signed a three-year deal with the New Zealand Warriors, worth an estimated $1.6 million.

In April 2015, Hoffman played his 250th NRL career game against his former club Melbourne Storm at AAMI Park.

On 17 February 2016, Hoffman was named the new club captain, after incumbent captain Simon Mannering stepped down from the role. Hoffman is the second Australian to have captained the New Zealand club, after Steve Price.

On 1 February 2017, new Warriors coach Stephen Kearney announced that Hoffman would be replaced as captain and would not be re-signed for the 2018 season.

On 10 June, Hoffman became just the 27th player (in the game) to reach the 300th game milestone. In his 300th game, he scored the first try of the game (in the first half) and kicked a conversion goal (to Hingano's try, in the 80th minute) during the Warriors' 34-12 round 14 win against the Gold Coast Titans.

=== Melbourne Storm (2018) ===
On 10 October 2017, the Melbourne Storm announced that Hoffman would return to the club on a 1-year deal that saw him end his playing career at the club. On 3 July 2018, Hoffman publicly announced that he was retiring at the end of the 2018 NRL season.

== Representative career ==
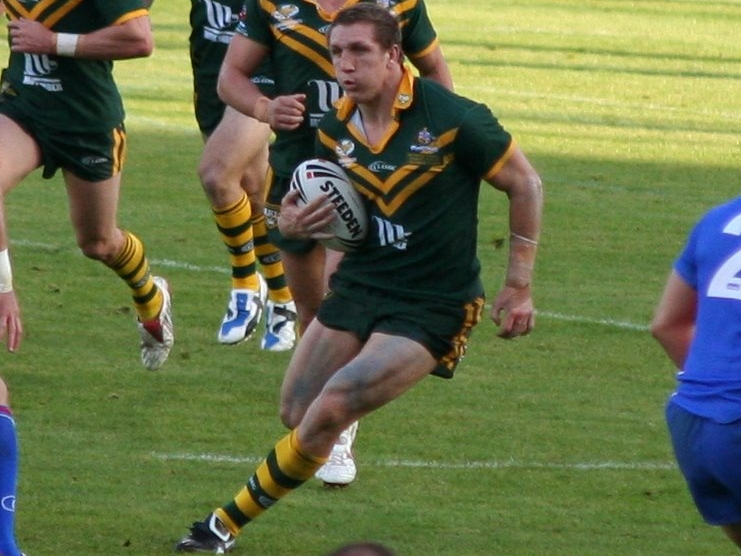
Hoffman playing for Australia

While attending Campbelltown St. Gregory's College, Hoffman played for the Australian Schoolboys team in 2002.

He was named as the 18th man for Australia in the 2007 ANZAC Test against New Zealand. In October, 2007, he was selected in the run-on side for the Centenary Test against New Zealand in Wellington.

Again as 18th man, Hoffman was on stand-by for the 2007 New South Wales State of Origin Team in game 1 of the series. He was selected on the bench in game 2 and 3 of the same series.

In 2008, Hoffman was named in the New South Wales starting side in all three Origin matches.

In August 2008, he was named in the Australia national rugby league team preliminary 46-man Kangaroos squad for the 2008 Rugby League World Cup.

He was selected for City in the City vs Country match on 8 May 2009.

== Statistics ==
=== NRL ===
Statistics are correct to the end of the 2018 season

†	Denotes seasons in which Hoffman won an NRL Premiership
†	Denotes seasons in which Hoffman won an NRL Premiership that was later stripped

Season	Team	Matches	T	G	GK %	F/G	Pts	W	L	D	W-L %
2003	Melbourne Storm	13	2	0	—	0	8	7	6	0	53.85
2004	Melbourne Storm	20	2	0	—	0	8	10	10	0	50.00
2005	Melbourne Storm	23	4	0	—	0	16	12	11	0	52.17
2006	Melbourne Storm	27	10	0	—	0	40	22	5	0	81.48
2007†	Melbourne Storm	25	10	0	—	0	40	23	2	0	92.00
2008	Melbourne Storm	21	4	0	—	0	16	17	4	0	80.95
2009†	Melbourne Storm	25	6	0	0.0	0	24	16	8	1	64.00
2010	Melbourne Storm	16	3	0	0.0	0	12	10	6	0	62.50
2011	Wigan Warriors	35	11				48				
2012†	Melbourne Storm	27	11	0	—	0	44	20	7	0	74.07
2013	Melbourne Storm	24	4	0	—	0	16	16	7	1	66.67
2014	Melbourne Storm	24	3	0	—	0	12	13	11	0	54.17
2015	New Zealand Warriors	18	3	0	—	0	12	8	10	0	44.44
2016	New Zealand Warriors	23	2	0	—	0	8	9	14	0	39.13
2017	New Zealand Warriors	19	6	1	100%	0	26	7	12	0	36.84
2018	Melbourne Storm	20	2	0	—	0	8	12	8	0	60.00
Career totals		359	82	1	33.00	0	330	202	121	2	62.15

=== State of Origin ===
†	Denotes seasons in which Hoffman won a State of Origin Series

Season	Team	Matches	T	G	GK %	F/G	Pts	W	L	D	W-L %
2007	New South Wales	2	0	0	—	0	0	1	1	0	50.00
2008	New South Wales	3	0	0	—	0	0	1	2	0	33.33
2013	New South Wales	3	0	0	—	0	0	1	2	0	33.33
2014†	New South Wales	3	0	0	—	0	0	2	1	0	66.66
2015	New South Wales	3	0	0	—	0	0	1	2	0	33.33
Career totals		14	0	0	—	0	0	6	8	0	42.86

=== Australia ===
Season	Team	Matches	T	G	GK %	F/G	Pts	W	L	D	W-L %
2007	Australia	1	0	0	—	0	0	1	0	0	100.00
2008	Australia	1	0	0	—	0	0	1	0	0	100.00
2009	Australia	2	0	0	—	0	0	1	0	1	75.00
2012	Australia	1	0	0	—	0	0	1	0	0	100.00
2014	Australia	1	0	0	—	0	0	0	1	0	0.00
Career totals		6	0	0	—	0	0	4	1	1	80.00

== Honours ==
Melbourne Storm

- 2006 NRL Grand Final Runner-up
- 2008 World Club Challenge Runner-up
- 2010 World Club Challenge Winners
- 2012 NRL Grand Final Winners
- 2013 World Club Challenge Winners
- 2018 World Club Challenge Winners

Wigan Warriors

- 2011 World Club Challenge Runners-Up
- 2011 Challenge Cup Winners

Individual

- 2012 – Melbourne Storm – Forward of the Year
- 2013 – Spirit of ANZAC Medal
- 2014 – Brad Fittler Medal
