= Slade Griffin =

New Zealand international rugby league footballer

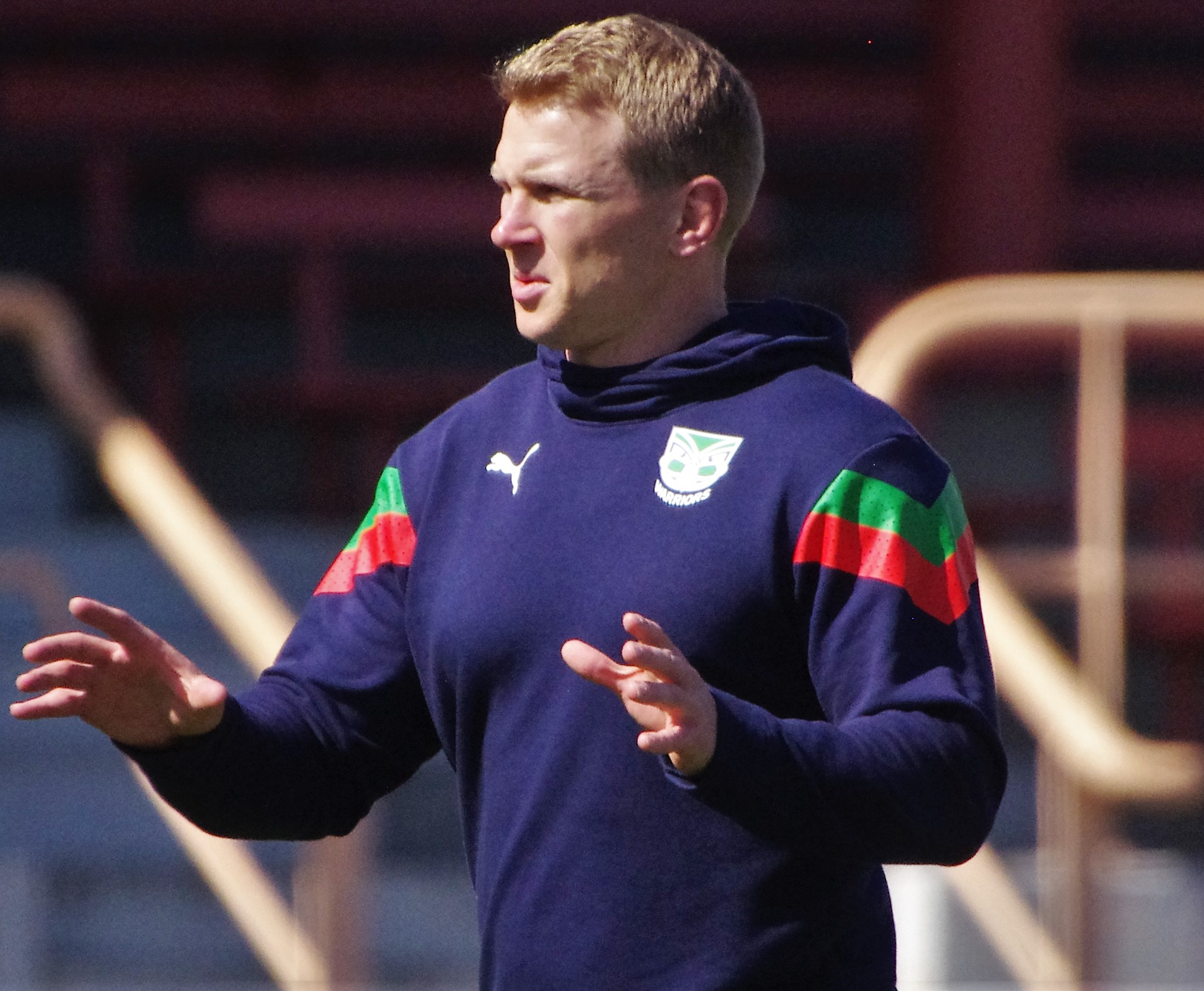

Personal information
- Born: 17 January 1991 (age 35) Glen Innes, New South Wales, Australia
- Height: 178 cm (5 ft 10 in)
- Weight: 94 kg (14 st 11 lb)

Playing information
- Position: Hooker, Lock
Club
Years	Team	Pld	T	G	FG	P
2013–17	Melbourne Storm	25	0	0	0	0
2018	Newcastle Knights	16	2	0	0	8
	Total	41	2	0	0	8
Representative
Years	Team	Pld	T	G	FG	P
2018	New Zealand	1	0	0	0	0
- Source: As of 20 May 2019

Slade Griffin (born 17 January 1991) is a former New Zealand international rugby league footballer. His positions were hooker and lock. He is currently an assistant coach of the New Zealand Warriors in the NRL Premiership.

He previously played for the Melbourne Storm and the Newcastle Knights in the NRL. He won the 2017 NRL Grand Final with Melbourne. He played 1 game for the New Zealand kiwis before suffering a career ending knee injury the following weekend.

== Early life ==
Born in Glen Innes, Australia, Griffin grew up in Greymouth, New Zealand. He was educated at Greymouth High School.

Griffin played his junior rugby league for the Cobden-Kohinoor Keas, before being signed by the Melbourne Storm.

== Playing career ==
=== Early career ===
From 2009 to 2011, Griffin played for the Melbourne Storm's NYC team, scoring 13 tries in 46 appearances, before graduating to the Storm's New South Wales Cup team, Cronulla-Sutherland Sharks in 2012.

In a 2012 pre-season trial match, he tore the anterior cruciate ligament in his right knee, ruling him out for the rest of the season, however the Storm decided to extend his contract for another year allowing him to come back from injury.

=== 2013 ===
In round 1 of the 2013 NRL season, Griffin made his NRL debut for the Storm against the St. George Illawarra Dragons.

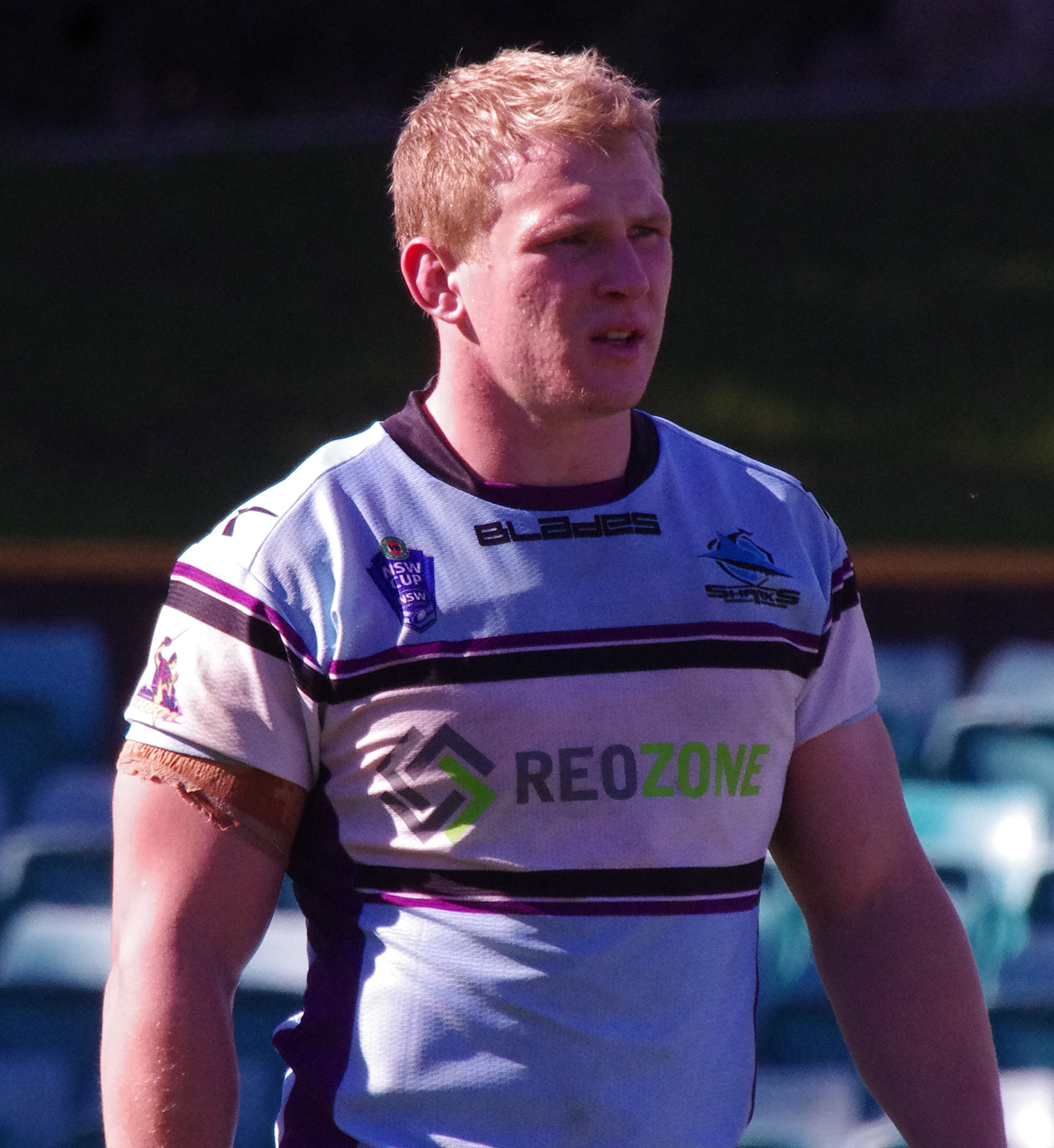
Griffin playing for the Storm-Sharks NSW Cup team in 2013.

In June, he re-signed with the Storm on a 1-year contract until the end of 2014. He went on to play 11 NRL games in his debut season.

=== 2014 ===
In March, Griffin re-signed with the Storm on a 2-year contract until the end of 2016. In April during a New South Wales Cup game, he tore his anterior cruciate ligament for a second time, this time in his left knee, stopping him from playing any NRL games in the 2014 season. In July, he received a two match suspension from the NRL after being found to have placed a bet on NRL matches.

=== 2015 ===
In April while playing in an Intrust Super Cup game for the Sunshine Coast Falcons, Griffin suffered a third anterior cruciate ligament injury, the second in his left knee, which would again rule him out for the season without playing any NRL matches.

=== 2016 ===
After 1056 days since his last NRL match, Griffin returned to the Storm line-up in round 15 of the 2016 season, starting at hooker. In October, he re-signed with the Storm on a 1-year contract until the end of 2017.

=== 2017 ===
In 2017, Griffin was able to break into Melbourne's line-up more regularly, coming off the interchange bench in their 2017 NRL Grand Final win over the North Queensland Cowboys. He finished the season having played in 14 NRL matches. Two days after the grand final, he signed a 2-year contract with the Newcastle Knights starting in 2018, in a bid for more first-grade opportunity with Australian captain Cameron Smith ahead of him for the starting hooker position at the Storm.

=== 2018 ===
In round 1 of the 2018 season, Griffin made his debut for the Knights in their 19-18 golden point extra-time win over the Manly Warringah Sea Eagles, scoring a try. In June, he made his international debut for New Zealand against England in Denver, Colorado. Just a week later, while playing for the Knights in their round 16 clash against the Canterbury-Bankstown Bulldogs, he was passing the ball from dummy half and his leg got caught in a position which ruptured multiple ligaments in his left knee, including a ruptured anterior cruciate ligament (ACL) knee graft, ruptured lateral ligament and torn lateral meniscus. This would be his third ACL knee injury to his left knee and meant he faced a 9-12 month recovery period.

=== 2019 ===
While working as a trainer and coach for the Knights during the 2019 season, Griffin ultimately didn't make it back from his knee injury, departing the club at the end of the season.

== Coaching career ==
In July 2020, Griffin was announced as the new coach of the New Zealand Warriors NRL Women's (NRLW) team.

In 2023, Griffin made a mark as head coach of the Warriors reserve grade team that finished third in the New South Wales Cup.

That earned him promotion as the NRL side’s forwards coach for 2024 after Justin Morgan joined the Cowboys.

== Statistics ==
Year	Team	Games	Tries	Pts
2013	Melbourne Storm	10		
2016	Melbourne Storm	1		
2017	Melbourne Storm	14		
2018	Newcastle Knights	16	2	8
	Totals	41	2	8

== Personal life ==
Griffin currently studies a Bachelor of Property and Real Estate at Deakin University.
