= Luke Kelly (rugby league) =

Australian rugby league footballer

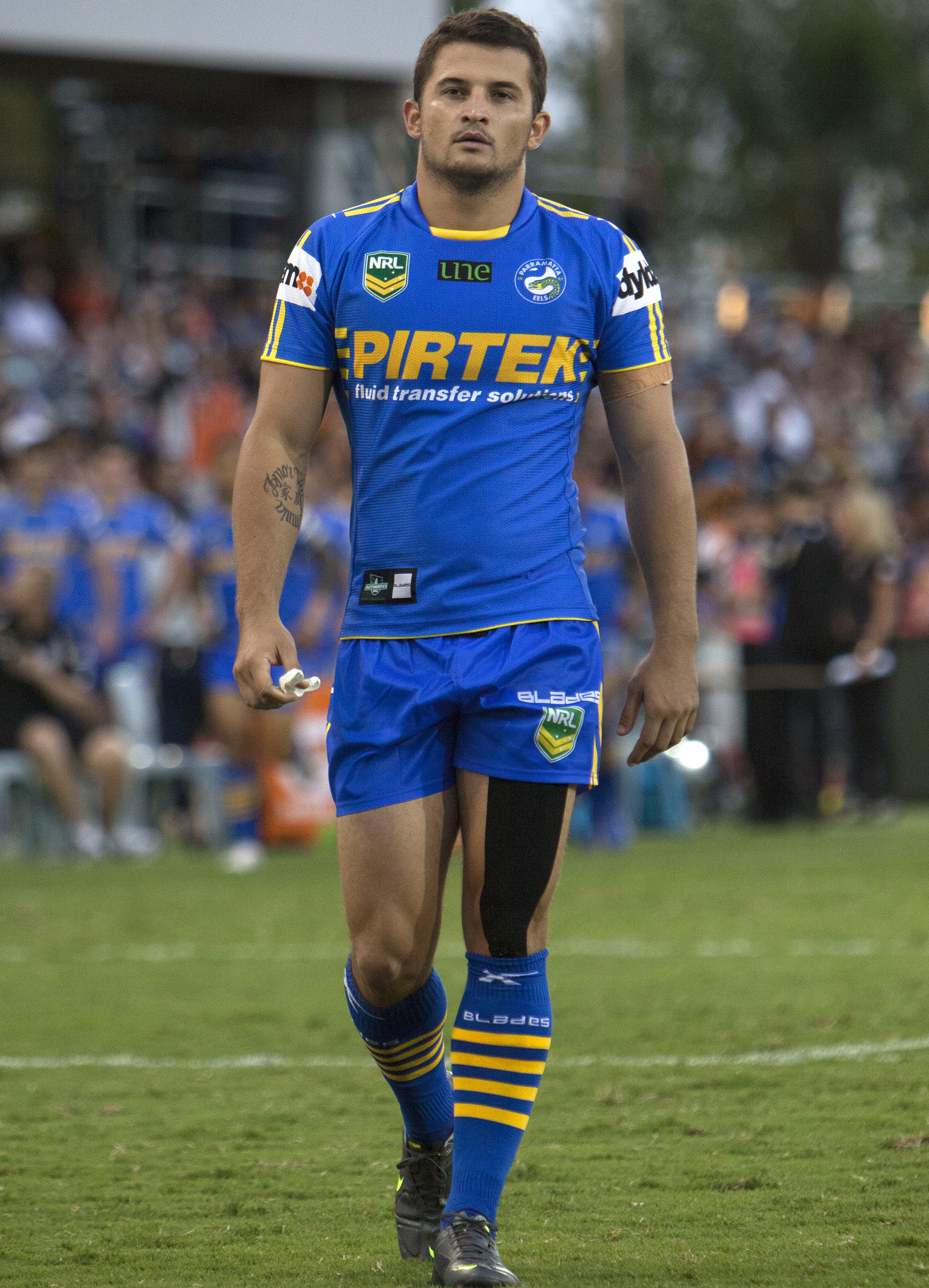

Personal information
- Born: 13 October 1989 (age 37) Katherine, Northern Territory, Australia

Playing information
- Height: 181 cm (5 ft 11 in)
- Weight: 86 kg (13 st 8 lb)
- Position: Five-eighth, Halfback
Club
| Years | Team | Pld | T | G | FG | P |
|---|---|---|---|---|---|---|
| 2009–12 | Melbourne Storm | 6 | 0 | 0 | 0 | 0 |
| 2012–16 | Parramatta Eels | 41 | 3 | 14 | 2 | 42 |
| 2017 | South Sydney | 2 | 0 | 0 | 0 | 0 |
| | Total | 49 | 3 | 14 | 2 | 42 |

Luke Kelly (born 13 October 1989) is an Australian former professional rugby league footballer who most recently played for the South Sydney Rabbitohs in the National Rugby League, as a five-eighth or halfback.

== Background ==
Luke Kelly was born in Katherine, Northern Territory, Australia.

After starting out at the Katherine Bushrangers in the Northern Territory Rugby League competition, Kelly then moved to boarding school in Sydney, playing at famed league nursery, St Gregory's College, Campbelltown. Kelly was discovered by Storm scouts at a NSWCCC tournament and, after one year with the Western Suburbs Magpies SG Ball side, moved to Melbourne to play in the NRL Under-20s.

== Playing career ==
=== Melbourne ===
Kelly was the captain of the Melbourne Storm NRL Under-20s winning team in 2009. He won the Jack Gibson Medal as player of the match in the Grand Final win over Wests Tigers. He had made his NRL debut for Melbourne against the Parramatta Eels in 2009 in round 17 of the 2009 NRL season.

Kelly played in four NRL games in 2010, three of these came in succession at the back-end of the season. He missed much of the 2011 season through injury, playing one further game for Melbourne in 2012.

=== Parramatta ===
Kelly joined the Parramatta Eels mid-season in 2012 and made his debut for the club against the Penrith Panthers in round 16, where Parramatta won 19-18. Kelly played 4 games for Parramatta in his first season at the club as they finished last on the table and claimed the wooden spoon for the first time since 1972.

In June 2013, Kelly was one of 12 Parramatta players that were told that their futures at the club were uncertain by coach, Ricky Stuart. Kelly made a total of 18 appearances for Parramatta in the 2013 NRL season as the club finished last for a second consecutive year.

Kelly was limited to only six appearances for Parramatta in the 2014 NRL season as the club narrowly missed out on the finals.

On 16 May 2015, Kelly played his first game of the season against the New Zealand Warriors. Kelly missed all 3 conversions including one right next to the uprights. With New Zealand leading by one point with 3 minutes to go Kelly kicked a field goal to make it 13-13. Parramatta lost the game in golden point 17-13.

=== South Sydney ===
In October 2016, Kelly signed with the South Sydney Rabbitohs for the 2017 NRL season, as cover for regular halves Adam Reynolds and Cody Walker.

On 3 March 2017, Kelly made his debut for the South Sydney Rabbitohs against the Wests Tigers in the first round of the NRL season. On 5 August 2017, Kelly scored an individual solo try in North Sydney's victory over Wests Tigers 42-10. On 1 September, Kelly was recalled to the Souths side to replace the injured Adam Reynolds in the final game of the regular season against his former club Parramatta.

At the end of the season it was announced on the official South Sydney website that Kelly was one of the players whose contract would not be renewed for next year and would be leaving the club.

On 29 January 2018, Kelly announced that he had retired from Rugby League as a player and moved into a role behind the scenes as a player well-being manager at Souths.
