= Ryan Tandy =

Australian rugby league footballer

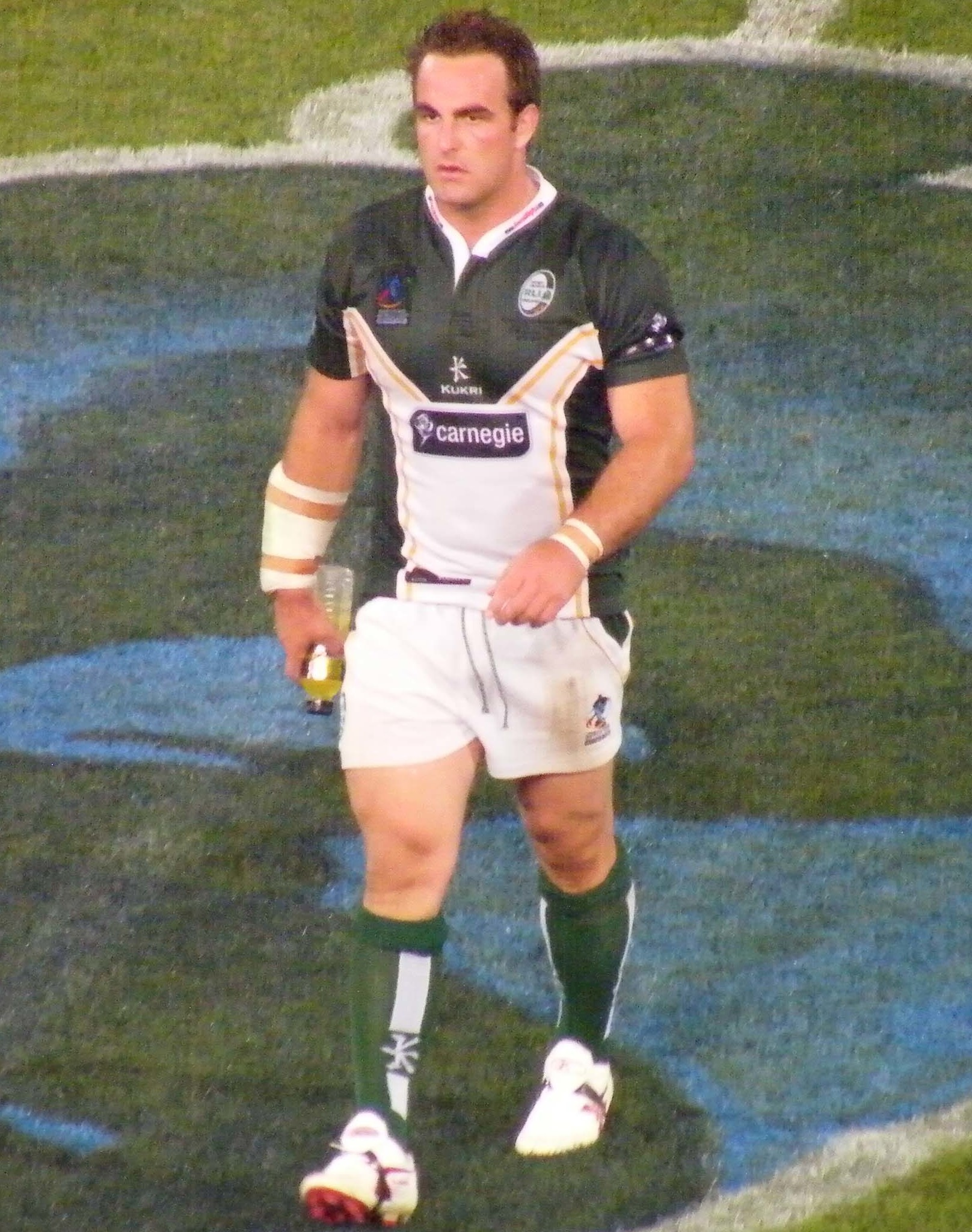

Personal information
- Born: 20 September 1981 Gosford, New South Wales, Australia
- Died: 28 April 2014 (aged 32) Saratoga, New South Wales, Australia

Playing information
- Height: 185 cm (6 ft 1 in)
- Weight: 98 kg (15 st 6 lb)
- Position: Prop
Club
Years	Team	Pld	T	G	FG	P
2003	St. George Illawarra	3	0	0	0	0
2003	South Sydney	3	0	0	0	0
2004	Whitehaven	9	4	0	0	16
2005	Barrow Raiders	7	2	0	0	4
2005	Whitehaven	7	0	0	0	0
2006	Widnes Vikings	20	6	0	0	24
2007	Doncaster	8	1	0	0	4
2007	Hull Kingston Rovers	12	2	0	0	8
2008	Wests Tigers	2	0	0	0	0
2009–10	Melbourne Storm	16	1	0	0	4
2010	Canterbury Bulldogs	12	1	0	0	4
	Total	99	17	0	0	64
Representative
Years	Team	Pld	T	G	FG	P
2006–08	Ireland	5	1	0	0	4
2008	NSW Residents	1	1	0	0	4
- Source: As of 9 January 2024

Ryan Tandy (20 September 1981 – 28 April 2014) was an international rugby league footballer who played in the 2000s and 2010s. He played as a prop in the National Rugby League (NRL) for the St. George Illawarra Dragons, South Sydney Rabbitohs, Wests Tigers, Melbourne Storm, and the Canterbury-Bankstown Bulldogs, and in the Super League for Hull Kingston Rovers. He was banned from playing professional rugby league in Australia after being found guilty of spot-fixing during a match in 2010, and in 2014 died of a suspected drug overdose.

== Background ==
Of Irish heritage, Tandy was born in Gosford, New South Wales, Australia, on 20 September 1981. He played Junior rugby league for the Kincumber Colts on the Central Coast of New South Wales.

== Playing career ==
Tandy's career covered stints with the St. George Illawarra Dragons, South Sydney Rabbitohs, Wests Tigers, Melbourne Storm, and the Canterbury-Bankstown Bulldogs in the NRL. He also played for Hull Kingston Rovers in the Super League. In the National Leagues system he played for Doncaster, Widnes Vikings, Whitehaven and Barrow. He was an Ireland international.

Tandy débuted for the Wests Tigers first grade team against the Brisbane Broncos in Round 15 in 2008.

Tandy was selected in the Ireland national team for the 2008 Rugby League World Cup, which led to a contract with Melbourne Storm for 2009. He was a member of the victorious Melbourne squad in the 2009 NRL Grand Final against Parramatta, but the premiership title was later stripped from the Storm due to salary cap breaches.

The Melbourne Storm salary cap breach saw him sign with the Canterbury-Bankstown Bulldogs on 12 June 2010, and was sacked by them on 18 March 2011.

== Betting scandal ==
After the 21 August 2010 Canterbury-Bankstown match against the North Queensland Cowboys Tandy became embroiled in a betting scandal. The Totalisator Agency Board (TAB) announced that 95 per cent of bets placed on the first scoring play of this match were for the unusual option of a Cowboys penalty goal. Friends and associates of Tandy placed a large number of bets, with the total windfall for a successful bet expected to be over $100,000. Tandy was then responsible for two actions in the match to allow the opposing side to score a penalty goal inside the first two minutes: first by giving away possession to the Cowboys in the opening moments of the match by knocking on, and then giving away a penalty in the play-the-ball ten metres in front of the goal posts. These actions put the Cowboys in a position where a penalty goal was a likely outcome; but they decided on an attacking option and scored a try instead.

Tandy denied the accusations of deliberately giving away possession and a penalty to allow the exotic option on the bets to be successful. Despite this, he was arrested on 2 February 2011 for providing false evidence to a law enforcement agency during the investigation of the betting scandal. Tandy was in more than $70,000 debt at the time of the match, owing to losses from his own long-standing gambling addiction.

On 6 October 2011, Tandy was found to be guilty of manipulating the first scoring point of the game. He received an intensive correction order for six months. It required: community service, supervision and curfew, but he could have been jailed for two years. He appealed the charge in January 2012 but lost the case. Tandy received a lifetime ban from NRL rugby league over the spot fixing.

== Later life and death ==
In January 2014, Tandy was arrested and charged with kidnapping in connection with the recovery of a drug debt from the victim, police alleging that Tandy was serving as a standover man. Three months after being bailed, Tandy was found dead at his parents' home in Saratoga, New South Wales, following what is believed to have been an accidental overdose of prescription drugs.
