= Brian Waldron =

Australian businessman

Brian Waldron (born 1963 or 1964) is an Australian businessman who is best known as being the chief executive officer of the Melbourne Storm in the National Rugby League (NRL) between 2005 and 2010.

== Administrative career ==
=== St Kilda Football Club (AFL) ===
Waldron joined the St Kilda Football Club in 2000 as general manager of football operations, during which the club drafted and recruited the likes of Aaron Hamill, Fraser Gehrig, Nick Riewoldt and Justin Koschitzke.

Shortly after, he was appointed chief executive officer and presided over a period which saw the club rise from a perennial bottom two team to preliminary finalists. He resigned from the role at the end of the season.

=== Melbourne Storm (NRL) ===
Shortly after his departure from St Kilda, Waldron was appointed chief executive officer of the Melbourne Storm on 14 September 2004. He presided over a period in which the club enjoyed sustained on-field success, finishing on top of the ladder for three consecutive seasons between 2006 and 2008 and also qualifying for four consecutive NRL Grand Finals between 2006 and 2009, winning premierships in 2007 and 2009. Waldron resigned as CEO in January 2010 to take up the same position at incoming Super Rugby club the Melbourne Rebels.

==== Salary cap breach ====
On 22 April 2010, it was revealed that the Storm had significantly breached the salary cap during the 2006–09 seasons, with the club stripped of all team honours (including their 2007 and 2009 premierships, as well as their three minor premierships won between 2006 and 2008) achieved during this period, as well as the right to compete for premiership points for the rest of the season (which to that point was only six rounds old); further, they were fined $500,000 and forced to return $1.1 million in prize money, which would be distributed to the other fifteen clubs evenly. Waldron, who left the club in January, was identified as a main culprit of the breaches.

In May 2011, a final report released by the National Rugby League recommended that Waldron never work in rugby league again.

Four years after the scandal, Waldron apologised for his role in the saga, being quoted as saying:

I take full accountability for my role, as the chief of the business the buck stops with me and right from the start I’m very remorseful and sorry for what happened. As CEO I ran an organisation that did some things that were wrong and outside the rules of the game and we pushed the boundaries.

— Brian Waldron, CEO of Melbourne Storm 2005-2010, Herald Sun

=== Melbourne Rebels (Super Rugby) ===
Waldron was appointed chief executive officer of the Melbourne Rebels Super Rugby club in 2010 ahead of its entry into the competition in 2011, but resigned shortly after being implicated in the Melbourne Storm's salary cap scandal in April the same year.
