= Rory Kostjasyn =

Ireland international rugby league footballer and coach

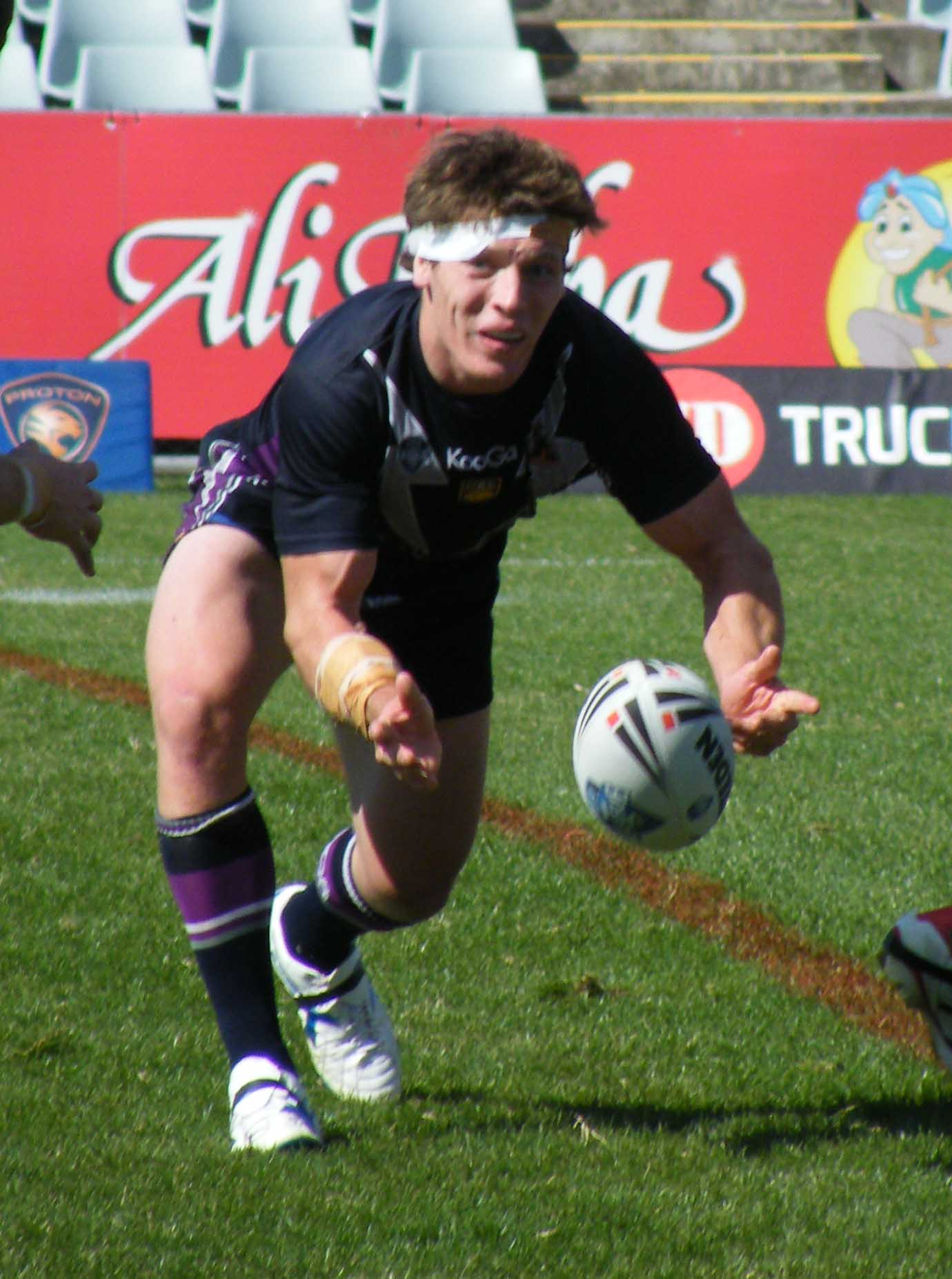

Personal information
- Born: 6 June 1987 (age 38) Auburn, New South Wales, Australia

Playing information
- Height: 184 cm (6 ft 0 in)
- Weight: 95 kg (14 st 13 lb)
- Position: Hooker, Five-eighth
Club
Years	Team	Pld	T	G	FG	P
2010–12	Melbourne Storm	33	2	0	0	8
2013–16	North Qld Cowboys	95	4	0	0	16
	Total	128	6	0	0	24
Representative
Years	Team	Pld	T	G	FG	P
2010	NSW Residents	1	1	0	0	4
2013	Ireland	3	0	0	0	0
2016	NSW Country	1	0	0	0	0

Rory Kostjasyn (born 6 June 1987) is a former Ireland international rugby league footballer. He played in the National Rugby League (NRL) for the Melbourne Storm and North Queensland Cowboys, with whom he was a member of their 2015 NRL premiership and 2016 World Club Challenge winning sides. An Ireland international and New South Wales Country representative, he played at hooker, but could also fill in at lock, and five-eighth.

Kostjasyn currently works in the Dolphins (NRL) coaching department. He was previously with the Newcastle Knights coaching department and previously coached their Canterbury Cup NSW team.

== Background ==
Kostjasyn was born in Sydney, New South Wales, Australia and grew up in Berkeley Vale on New South Wales' Central Coast. Of Russian and Irish descent, Kostjasyn's grandparents on his father's side are both from Russia.

He played his junior football for the Berkeley Vale Panthers, and was signed by the Sydney Roosters as a teenager, playing for their Jersey Flegg Cup side. While contracted to the Roosters, Kostjasyn played for their New South Wales Cup affiliate Newtown.

He played in the 2006 NSW Cup grand final for Newtown who were the Sydney Roosters feeder club at the time against Parramatta. Newtown would lose the grand final 20-19 at Stadium Australia.

After not playing first grade at the Roosters, he signed with the Melbourne Storm for the 2010 season.

== Playing career ==
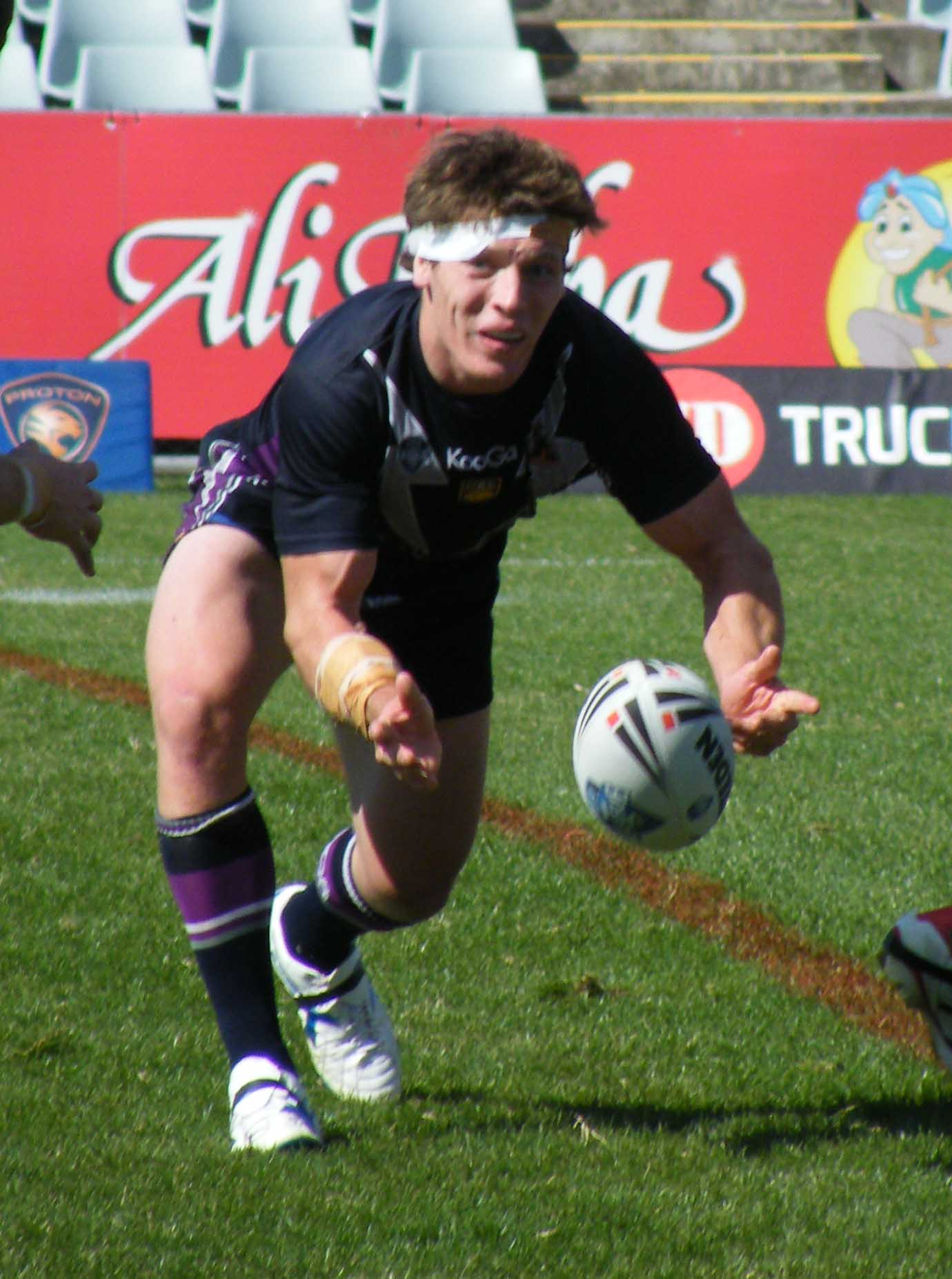
Kostjasyn playing for the Central Coast Storm in 2009

=== 2010 ===
Kostjasyn made his first-team début for the Melbourne Storm against Harlequins RL at the Twickenham Stoop in the World City Challenge, the Storm's warm-up match before the 2010 World Club Challenge. He played again a week later against the Leeds Rhinos from the bench in the World Club Challenge.

Training with the first grade squad over that summer earned Kostjasyn a spot in the club's World Cup Challenge squad and a subsequent medal as part of the winning team. He was later signed by the club on a two-year contract.

He then went on to make his National Rugby League début in the 2010 NRL season. He went on to play 7 games that season making his début in Round 1 of that season. He scored his first try for the club in Round 14 of the 2010 season.

=== 2011 ===
In 2011, Kostjasyn was a more regular member of the Melbourne team, playing 12 matches, starting in three of them. Known for his versatility, played games at five-eighth, hooker and lock in 2011.

=== 2012 ===
Kostjasyn played in 14 games in the 2012 NRL season, deputising for injured teammate Cooper Cronk in the halves at times. In Week One of the 2012 finals series against the South Sydney Rabbitohs, Kostjasyn made his first finals appearance. He was named 18th man for the Melbourne Storm in the 2012 Grand Final.

On 26 July 2012, Kostjasyn signed a two-year deal with the North Queensland Cowboys for the 2013 and 2014 seasons.

=== 2013 ===
In 2013, Kostjasyn mainly played the hooker for the Cowboys, rotating with Ray Thompson. He made 20 appearances for North Queensland in 2013, including the semi-final against the Cronulla Sharks, which he started at hooker.

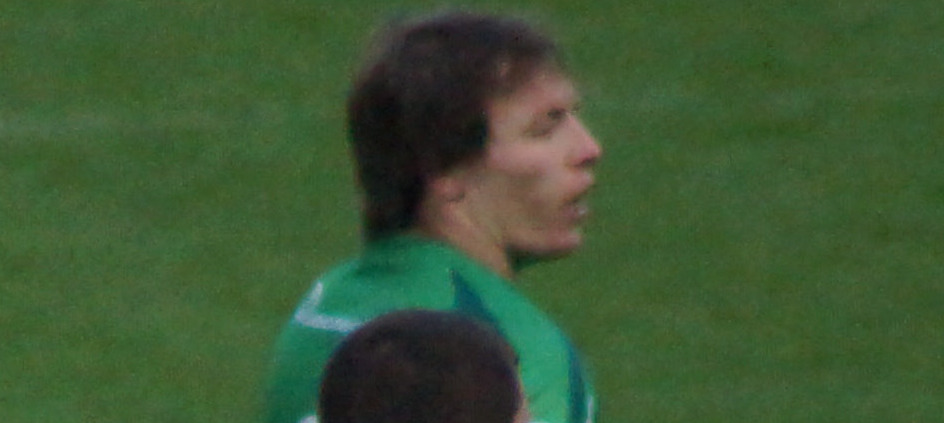
Kostjasyn playing for Ireland in 2013

At the end of the season, he was named in Ireland's 24-man squad for the 2013 Rugby League World Cup, playing 3 games in the tournament.

=== 2014 ===
In February, Kostjasyn played in the Cowboys' championship-winning Auckland Nines side. On 2 July, he re-signed with the North Queensland on another two-year-deal, keeping him with the Cowboys until 2016. He missed just one first grade game in 2014, due to broken ribs, starting 23 games at hooker.

=== 2015 ===
On 4 October, Kostjasyn was a member of the Cowboys' Grand Final winning side, coming off the bench in the side's 17–16 victory over the Brisbane Broncos. The Grand Final was his 100th NRL game.

=== 2016 ===
On 21 February, Kostjasyn was a member of the Cowboys' World Club Challenge winning side, coming off the bench in the side's 38–4 victory over the Leeds Rhinos at Headingley Stadium. He played 26 games in his final season at the Cowboys and represented Country Origin for the first time in May. In October, he signed a 2-year contract with the Newcastle Knights starting in 2017.

=== 2017 ===
During pre-season training with the Knights on 7 January, Kostjasyn suffered an accidental blow to his throat from Danny Levi. He was required to be sent immediately to the John Hunter Hospital after suffering a fracture in the Cricoid cartilage in his neck. He stayed overnight in hospital and was released on 8 January. On 25 July, he announced his retirement from rugby league due to breathing difficulties from the injury.

== Post playing ==
Kostjasyn after retiring from the NRL he revealed that his injury compromised his breathing and changed his voice. In 2018, Kostjasyn became the coach of the Newcastle Knights reserve grade side. In 2020, Kostjasyn was appointed as the teams Development coach. On 3 October 2024 Dolphins (NRL) announced via social media that Kostjasyn would join the team as an assistant coach.

== Achievements and accolades ==
=== Team ===
- 2010 World Club Challenge: Melbourne Storm – Winners*
- 2014 NRL Auckland Nines: North Queensland Cowboys – Winners
- 2015 NRL Grand Final: North Queensland Cowboys – Winners
- 2016 World Club Challenge: North Queensland Cowboys – Winners

== Statistics ==
=== NRL ===
Statistics are correct to the end of the 2015 season

†	Denotes seasons in which Kostjasyn won an NRL Premiership

Season	Team	Matches	T	G	GK %	F/G	Pts=
2010	Melbourne Storm	6	1	0	—	0	4
2011	Melbourne Storm	12	0	0	—	0	0
2012†	Melbourne Storm	14	1	0	—	0	4
2013	North Queensland Cowboys	20	0	0	—	0	0
2014	North Queensland Cowboys	25	2	0	—	0	8
2015†	North Queensland Cowboys	22	1	0	—	0	4
2016	North Queensland Cowboys	26	1	0	—	0	4
Career totals		126	6	0	—	0	24

=== International ===
Season	Team	Matches	T	G	GK %	F/G	Pts=
2013	Ireland	3	0	0	—	0	0
Career totals		3	0	0	—	0	0
