= WCC 2010 =

WCC 2010 may refer to:

- World Chess Championship 2010
- 2010 World Club Challenge
