= 2010 WCC =

2010 WCC may refer to:

- World Chess Championship 2010
- 2010 World Club Challenge
