= Anthony Quinn (rugby league) =

Australian rugby league footballer

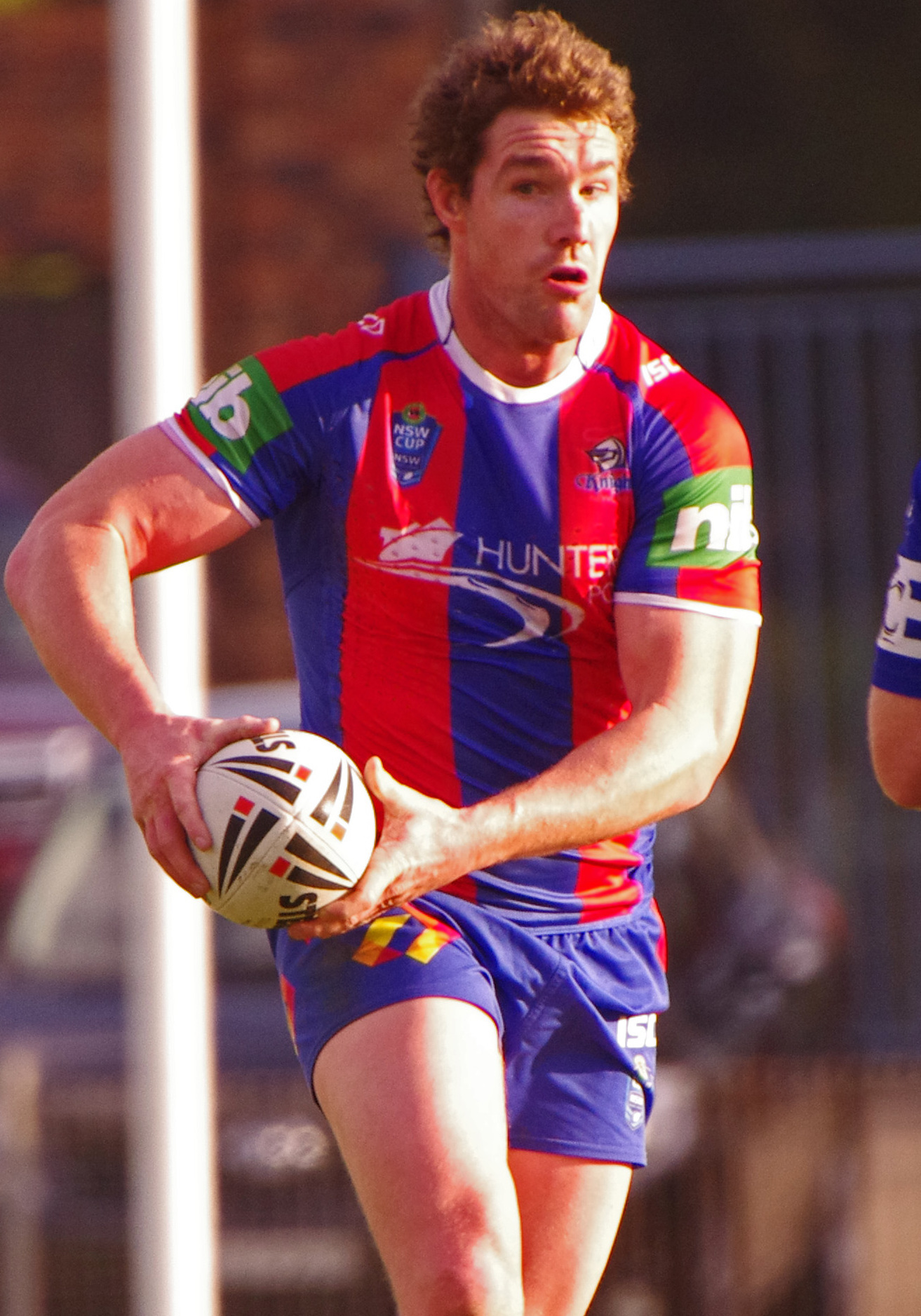

Personal information
- Born: 19 January 1983 (age 43) Penrith, New South Wales, Australia

Playing information
- Height: 181 cm (5 ft 11 in)
- Weight: 94 kg (14 st 11 lb)
- Position: Wing, Centre
Club
Years	Team	Pld	T	G	FG	P
2002–06	Newcastle Knights	103	47	0	0	188
2007–12	Melbourne Storm	105	39	0	0	156
2013	Newcastle Knights	4	1	0	0	4
	Total	212	87	0	0	348
Representative
Years	Team	Pld	T	G	FG	P
2006–08	Country Origin	3	2	0	0	8
2008	New South Wales	3	2	0	0	8

Anthony Quinn (born 19 January 1983) is an Australian former professional rugby league footballer who played in the 2000s and 2010s. He played as a winger and centre for the Newcastle Knights and Melbourne Storm in the NRL.

== Early life ==
Born in Penrith, New South Wales, Quinn was educated at St Francis Xavier's College, Hamilton, where he represented 1999 & 2000 Australian Schoolboys.

Anthony played his junior football for the Valentine-Eleebana Red Devils before being signed by the Newcastle Knights.

== Playing career ==
In round 1 of the 2002 NRL season he made his NRL debut for the Newcastle Knights against the Northern Eagles. He scored a try on debut.

In the 2005 NRL season, Quinn made 18 appearances for Newcastle as the club endured one of the worst seasons on the field as the club finished last on the table.

At the end of 2006, after playing 103 games for the Knights, Quinn signed a three-year contract with the Melbourne Storm. In his first year at the Storm, he played in the Storm's 2007 NRL Grand Final win over the Manly-Warringah Sea Eagles and scored 2 tries in the match. In 2010, the 2007 premiership that Quinn won with Melbourne was stripped for major and deliberate breaches of the salary cap.

In 2008, Quinn played in the Storm's 2008 World Club Challenge defeat by Leeds.

In 2008, Quinn played in his second grand final, the 2008 NRL Grand Final defeat by the Manly-Warringah Sea Eagles.

In round 7 of the 2009 NRL season, Quinn injured his neck and had surgery so he could continue his career.

In 2010, Quinn scored a try in Melbourne's 2010 World Club Challenge win over Leeds.

In November 2012, Quinn re-joined the Newcastle Knights to trial for a contract.

On 7 January 2013, Quinn signed a one-year contract with the Newcastle Knights starting in the same year.

On 6 September 2013, Quinn re-signed with the Newcastle club on a one-year contract. On 24 January 2014, Quinn announced his retirement due to injury. In 2014, Quinn was signed up as an Australian Apprenticeships Ambassador for the Australian Government.

== Representative career ==
In 2006, Quinn made his representative debut after being selected for Country Origin in the annual City vs Country Origin match.

In 2008, Quinn was selected for New South Wales in Game 1 of the State of Origin series to play Queensland. He scored the first 2 tries of the match and went on to play in the next 2 games of the series.

In August 2008, Quinn was named in the preliminary 46-man Kangaroos squad for the 2008 Rugby League World Cup, however didn't make the final cut.

== Post playing ==
After retiring from the NRL, Quinn joined the RLPA as the Player Engagement Manager. Quinn works with the NSWIS (New South Wales Institute of Sport) as Athlete Wellbeing and Engagement Advisor.

== Statistics ==
Year	Team	Games	Tries	Pts
2002	Newcastle Knights	26	10	40
2003	Newcastle Knights	18	10	40
2004	Newcastle Knights	19	8	32
2005	Newcastle Knights	18	8	32
2006	Newcastle Knights	22	11	44
2007	Melbourne Storm	26	8	32
2008	Melbourne Storm	24	12	48
2009	Melbourne Storm	9	2	8
2010	Melbourne Storm	9	7	28
2011	Melbourne Storm	15	6	24
2012	Melbourne Storm	20	3	12
2013	Newcastle Knights	4	1	4
	Totals	212	87	348
