= 2007 NRL Grand Final =

Deciding match of Australian rugby league competition

Melbourne Storm	Manly Warringah Sea Eagles
34	8
	1	2	Total
MEL	10	24	34
MAN	4	4	8
- Date: 30 September 2007
- Stadium: Telstra Stadium
- Location: Sydney, Australia
- Clive Churchill Medal: Greg Inglis (MEL)
- National anthem: Vanessa Amorosi
- Referee: Tony Archer
- Attendance: 81,392

Broadcast partners
- Broadcasters: Nine Network
- Commentators: Ray Warren; Peter Sterling; Phil Gould

The 2007 NRL Grand Final was the conclusive, premiership-deciding match of the 2007 NRL season. It was played between the first-placed Melbourne Storm and second-placed Manly Warringah Sea Eagles at Telstra Stadium on 30 September, in front of 81,392 spectators. The 2007 Grand final was the fourth to be played between the first and second placed teams, and the first in three years. The match was the last Grand Final played at night until 2013; each Grand Final in the intervention switched to a 5:00pm AEST kick-off. This match was also the most-watched television program on Australian TV for 2007.

On 22 April 2010, Melbourne were stripped of this premiership, among other team honours, due to salary cap breaches exposed during the 2006–10 seasons.

== Background ==
The 2007 NRL season was the one hundredth season of professional rugby league football club competition in Australia, and the tenth run by the National Rugby League. Sixteen teams contested the NRL's 2007 Telstra Premiership, and with the inclusion of a new team, the Gold Coast Titans, the competition was the largest run since the 1999 NRL season.

=== Manly Warringah Sea Eagles ===
The 2007 Manly Warringah Sea Eagles season was the 58th in the club's history. Coached by Des Hasler and captained by Matt Orford, they finished the regular season in 2nd (out of 16) place.

=== Melbourne Storm ===
The 2007 Melbourne Storm season was the 10th in the club's history. Coached by Craig Bellamy and captained by Cameron Smith, they finished the regular season in 1st place to claim the minor premiership before going on to reach their third ever and second consecutive grand final.

== Teams ==
Matt Geyer was the only remaining Melbourne player from the club's 1999 NRL grand final-winning team.

Team details
Melbourne Storm		Position	Manly Warringah Sea Eagles
Name	Number	Position	Number	Name
Billy Slater	1	Fullback	1	Brett Stewart
Steve Turner	2	Wing	2	Michael Robertson
Matt King	3	Centre	3	Steven Bell
Israel Folau	4	Centre	4	Steve Matai
Anthony Quinn	5	Wing	5	Chris Hicks
Greg Inglis	6	Five eighth	6	Jamie Lyon
Cooper Cronk	7	Half back	7	Matt Orford (c)
Ben Cross	8	Prop forward	8	Jason King
Cameron Smith (c)	9	Hooker	9	Michael Monaghan
Brett White	10	Prop forward	10	Brent Kite
Clint Newton	11	Second row	11	Anthony Watmough
Ryan Hoffman	12	Second row	12	Glenn Stewart
Dallas Johnson	13	Lock forward	13	Luke Williamson
Jeremy Smith	14	Interchange	16	Mark Bryant
Matt Geyer	15	Interchange	17	Steve Menzies
Michael Crocker	16	Interchange	20	Jack Afamasaga
Jeff Lima	17	Interchange	21	Adam Cuthbertson
Craig Bellamy		Coach		Des Hasler
RLP

== Match details ==
The pre-match entertainment included performances from Hoodoo Gurus and Shannon Noll. Player, coach and commentator Frank Hyde was honoured during the half-time break with a video-tribute as well as a minute's silence prior to the Premier League Grand Final.

=== First half ===
Melbourne crossed early in the first half with a try to winger Anthony Quinn via a slick back-line movement that involved 3 decoy runners to lead 6–0. Another set play midway through the first half saw Melbourne extend the scoreline to 10–0 with a barging try to five-eighth Greg Inglis. Seconds before halftime, Manly centre Steve Matai crossed in the corner to take the deficit back to six points. The half-time score read 10–4 to Melbourne, with many surprised at how the scoreline was so close considering Melbourne's dominance.

=== Second half ===
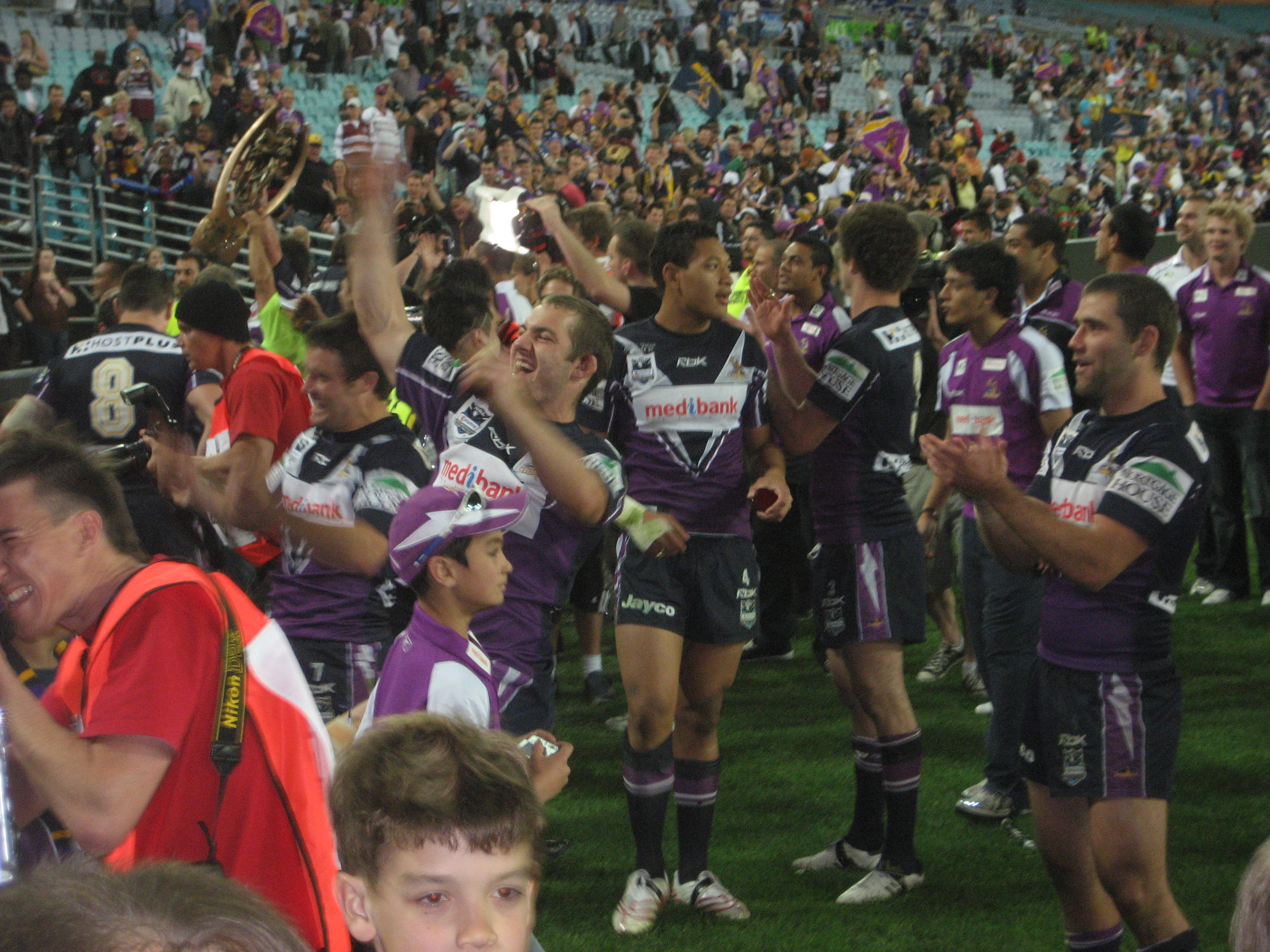
Storm players celebrating.

The second half started with major controversy after Manly fullback Brett Stewart was knocked unconscious by a massive hit from Melbourne players Michael Crocker and Billy Slater attempting to catch a bomb. Stewart failed to return following the hit, and it proved to be the turning point in the match as Melbourne immediately extended their lead to 14–4 with a try to Crocker. Two quick tries soon after by Melbourne players Matt King and Greg Inglis took the score out to 22–4 and the game looked set for a Melbourne victory. King barged over with a trademark Melbourne decoy play, while Inglis scored the try of the match with a vintage long range 60m run and powerful fend to post his second.

Manly soon pegged the score back to 22–8 with a nice try to winger Chris Hicks but it seemed too little too late for the Manly side. Melbourne then scored two late tries to second-rower Clint Newton and another for Anthony Quinn to take the scoreline to 34–8. Melbourne captain Cameron Smith was inaccurate with the boot, kicking only three goals from eight attempts (including a missed penalty goal).

Inglis was awarded the Clive Churchill Medal for best on field. The 34–8 Grand Final score was the third highest grand final margin in Australian rugby league history.

== Match summary ==
2007 NRL Grand Final

Sunday, 30 September
19:15 AEST (UTC+10)

Melbourne Storm	34 – 8	Manly Warringah Sea Eagles
Tries: 7 Quinn 12', 76'; Inglis 23', 55'; Crocker 44'; King 52'; Newton 72'; Goals: 3 C Smith 13', 74', 76' (3/8)	1st: 10–4; 2nd: 24–4; Report	Tries: 2 Matai 39'; Hicks 62'; Goals: Orford (0/2)

ANZStadium, Sydney
Attendance: 81,392
Referee: Tony Archer
Touch judges: Steve Chiddy, Russell Turner
Clive Churchill Medal: Greg Inglis (Melbourne)

== World Club Challenge ==
Having won the NRL grand final, Melbourne had earned the right to then travel to England for the following February's World Club Challenge match against the winners of the 2007 Super League Grand Final, Leeds Rhinos.
