= Cooper Cronk =

Australia international rugby league footballer

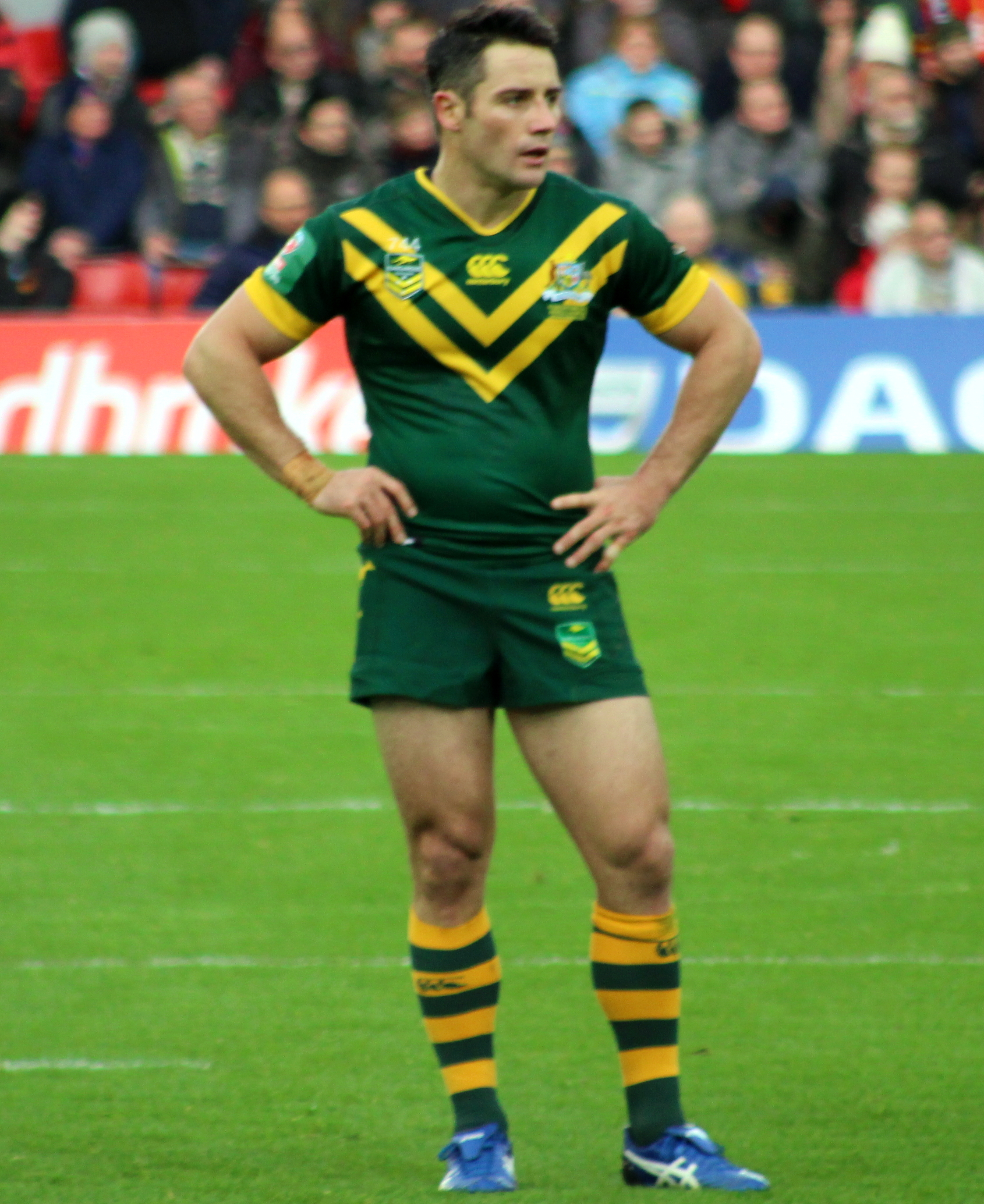

Personal information
- Full name: Cooper Patrick Cronk
- Born: 5 December 1983 (age 42) Brisbane, Queensland, Australia

Playing information
- Height: 178 cm (5 ft 10 in)
- Weight: 89 kg (14 st 0 lb)
- Position: Halfback
Club
| Years | Team | Pld | T | G | FG | P |
|---|---|---|---|---|---|---|
| 2004–17 | Melbourne Storm | 325 | 92 | 1 | 20 | 390 |
| 2018–19 | Sydney Roosters | 50 | 9 | 4 | 1 | 45 |
| | Total | 375 | 101 | 5 | 21 | 435 |
Representative
| Years | Team | Pld | T | G | FG | P |
| 2007–17 | Australia | 38 | 16 | 0 | 0 | 64 |
| 2010–17 | Queensland | 22 | 3 | 0 | 2 | 14 |
| 2012 | NRL All Stars | 1 | 0 | 0 | 0 | 0 |

Cooper Patrick Cronk (born 5 December 1983) is an Australian former professional rugby league footballer who played in the 2000s and 2010s. An Australian international and Queensland State of Origin representative halfback, he played most of his club career for the Melbourne Storm, though finished his career with the Sydney Roosters, both in the National Rugby League (NRL).

During his sixteen-year career, Cronk won four NRL Premierships (in 2012 and 2017 with Melbourne, and 2018 and 2019 with Sydney) (Note: Not included are Melbourne's 2007 and 2009 Grand Final wins, which were stripped due to long-term salary cap breaches.) from nine NRL Grand Final appearances. He won the Dally M Medal as the NRL's player of the year in 2013 and 2016, the Clive Churchill Medal as best player in the 2012 NRL Grand Final, the Golden Boot Award as international player of the year in 2016, and the NRL's Dally M Halfback of the Year on five occasions. (Note: Cronk won the Dally M Halfback of the Year in 2006, 2011, 2012, 2013, and 2016.)

== Early life ==
Cooper Cronk was born in Brisbane, Queensland, Australia.

Cronk played his junior rugby league with the Souths Acacia Ridge club.

He attended St. Laurence's College, South Brisbane from 1994 to 2000, where he was in the school's 1st XV rugby union side for a number of years. He was selected to play in the Australian Schoolboys squad along with former Wallaby captain Rocky Elsom.

== Playing career ==
In 2001, Cronk was selected to play rugby league for Queensland and Australian Schoolboys teams. He was then selected to play in the Queensland Cup's Norths Devils team. He quickly established himself in that competition and trained with the Storm Squad in 2003. He scored 37 tries for the Norths Devils in the Queensland Cup.

=== 2000s ===
Cronk made his debut for the Melbourne Storm in 2004, starting as a utility back coming off the bench and playing at five-eighth, hooker and lock.

In the 2006 NRL season, Cronk won the Dally M Halfback of the Year award. He also played at half-back for Melbourne in the 2006 NRL Grand Final loss to Brisbane.

In 2008, Cronk was called into the Australian test team to replace Johnathan Thurston who had twisted his ankle in training. Thurston later was cleared of injury and played in the test team over Cronk. In August, 2008, Cronk was named in the preliminary 46-man Kangaroos squad for the 2008 Rugby League World Cup, however he was not selected to make an appearance. When Cameron Smith was sidelined by a NRL Judiciary suspension during Melbourne's finals campaign of the 2008 NRL season, Cronk stood in as captain and captained the Storm in the 2008 NRL Grand Final defeat by Manly Sea Eagles.

In April 2009, he was named in the preliminary 25-man squad to represent Queensland in the opening State of Origin match for 2009, however he was not selected to make an appearance. He played in the 2009 NRL Grand Final against the Parramatta Eels, setting up 2 tries. This title was later stripped due to salary cap breaches. Cronk was named as part of the Four Nations team and played for Australia in the 2009 Four Nations Tournament in Australia against France as a utility.

=== 2010s ===
==== 2010–13 ====
Surgery on his groin saw Cronk miss Melbourne's appearance in the 2010 World Club Challenge. An injury to Johnathan Thurston saw Cronk selected for the 2010 ANZAC Test. Cronk played off the bench as a utility for Queensland in the 2010 State of Origin Series, playing in all three games. In Game II, he scored his first Origin try.

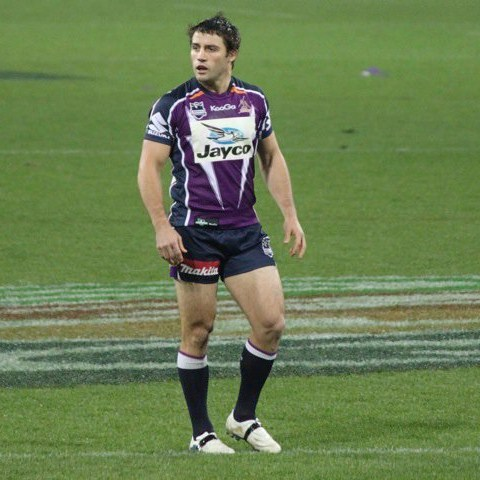
Cronk playing for Melbourne in 2010

He also played for Australia in the 2010 Four Nations.

Cronk played in the 2011 State of Origin Series. In Game I, he set up a try for Jharal Yow Yeh in the second half and in Game III, he set up Greg Inglis as well. In 2011, Cronk also played the tests against New Zealand at the Gold Coast and Newcastle on the bench. Cronk was part of the 2011 Rugby League Four Nations tournament, playing off the bench when the Kangaroos played the Kiwis and England. Cooper Cronk was selected to play Five-Eighth against Wales, with Johnathan Thurston at halfback, resting Darren Lockyer for the Four Nations Final. In the 2011 Rugby League Four Nations between Australia and Wales, Cronk scored 3 tries and set-up 2 tries for Australia. He also played in the Four Nations Grand Final against England.

As of 29 March 2012 Cooper agreed to a further four years with the Melbourne Storm. At the 2012 Dally M Awards Cronk was named the NRL's halfback of the year. In the 2012 NRL Grand Final victory over Canterbury-Bankstown, he won the Clive Churchill Medal for the man of the match award.

Cronk kicked the game and series-winning field goal in the final minutes of the third State of Origin match in 2012. He later said, "To be brutally honest I was in a state of grace at that particular moment. Every sinew in my body came together in one perfect whole. But those who have ever experienced that feeling, and it doesn't happen very often, will tell you it's in a whole other place of experience from the usual ego or vanity that drives my game. So I'm not afraid to own it for what it was."

In February 2013, he won man of the match in Storm's 18–14 win over Leeds in the World Club Challenge. Cronk was also selected as starting halfback for the annual ANZAC Test match between Australia and New Zealand in Canberra, playing at halfback for Australia. He also played a key role in Queensland's eighth consecutive series win with a 12–10 win over New South Wales in the decider, setting up the match winner try to Justin Hodges.

On 1 October 2013, Cronk was named the Dally M Player winning by two points in front of Queensland teammates Johnathan Thurston and Daly Cherry-Evans and Cronulla Sharks five-eight Todd Carney. He was also named the Dally M Halfback of the Year.

==== 2014–16 ====
Cronk broke his arm in the opening minutes of Game I of the 2014 State of Origin series on 28 May 2014. Written off for the series, he surprised the entire rugby league community by getting himself fit enough to take the field in Game III just six weeks later. Queensland lost the series after losing Games I and II, but in Game III on 9 July 2014 the Maroons routed New South Wales 32–8.

On 30 August 2014, Cronk played his 250th game for Melbourne Storm, a feat achieved by only 3 others players at the club.

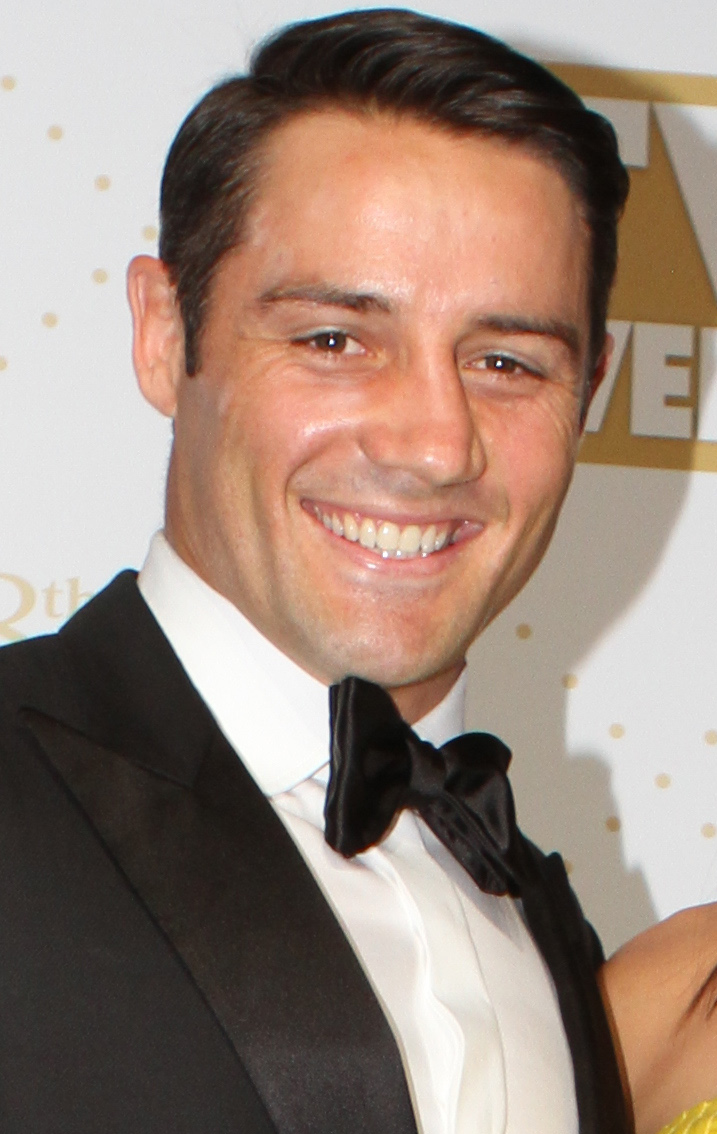
Cronk at the 2016 TV Week Logie Awards, May 2016

2016 began with rumours linking him to rival NRL clubs in Sydney, most notably the St George Illawarra Dragons. However, he put that in the back of his head to lead Melbourne to a great start to the season. On 2 April, he scored 2 tries to secure an 18–14 victory over the Newcastle Knights. 15 days later, he kicked a field goal in the 5th minute of golden point to give the Storm a 19–18 victory over the Wests Tigers. The Storm won 5 of their opening 7 games.

On 26 June 2016, Cronk became only the fifth NRL player in history to record 200 wins (from 289 games) in a 29 to 20 win over the West Tigers.

On 24 September 2016, in Melbourne's grand final qualifier against the Canberra Raiders, Cronk became just the 25th NRL player to notch up 300 first grade games. In doing so, he is only the 11th player to do so with the one club.

At the annual Rugby League Dally M awards on 28 September 2016, Cooper Cronk was named the Dally M Player of the Year for a second time after winning his first in 2013. Cronk tied with North Queensland Cowboys prop Jason Taumalolo to win. Cronk was also crowned Dally M Halfback of the Year earning the honours for the fifth time in his careers.

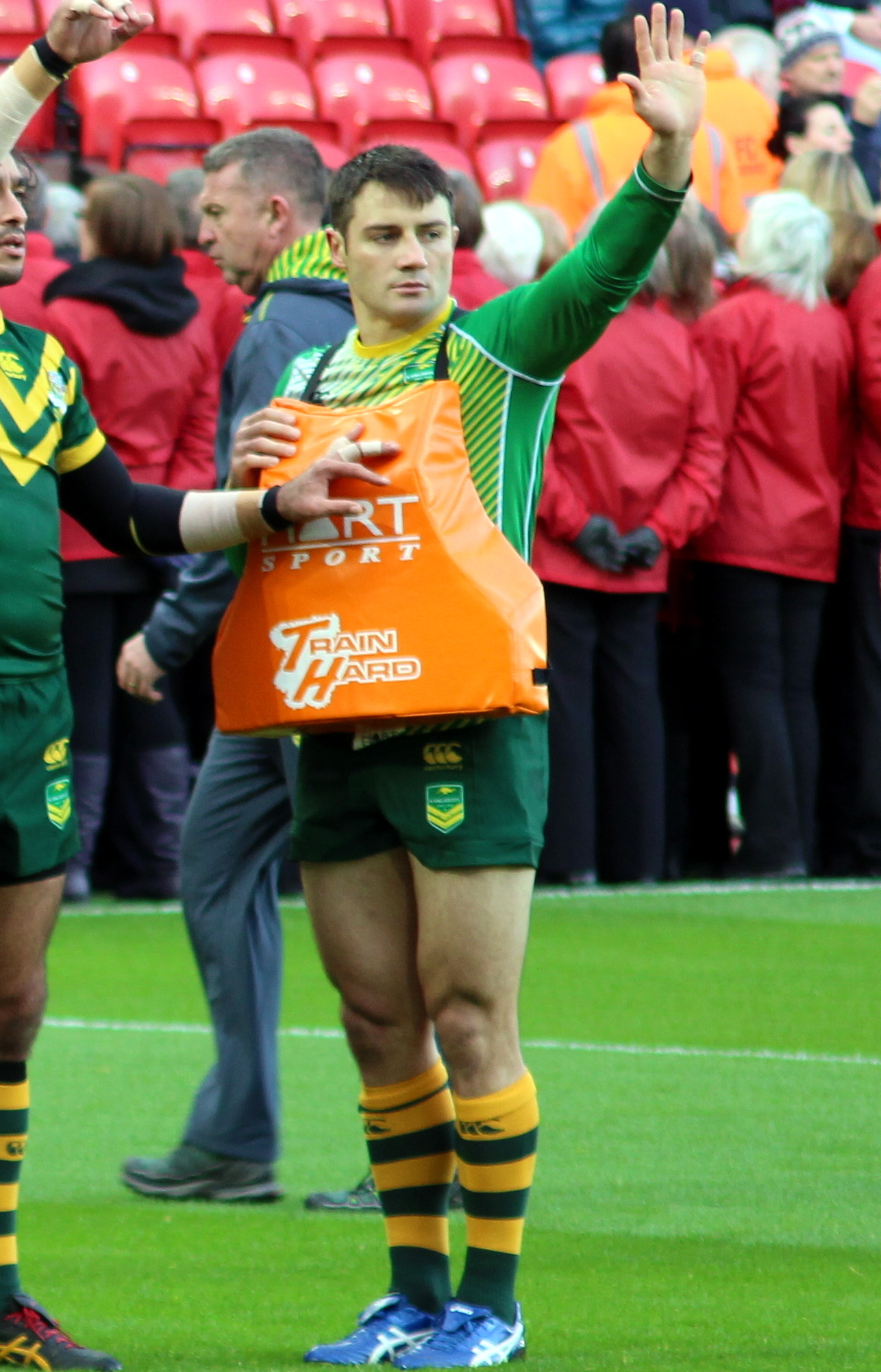
Cronk warming up for the Kangaroos at Anfield in 2016

This was further complemented on 22 December 2016, when Cooper Cronk won the 2016 Rugby League World Golden Boot Award (Worlds best player). The award is decided by a panel of Rugby League experts including Darren Lockyer.

==== 2017-2019 ====
On 4 April 2017, Cronk made the announcement that the 2017 NRL season would be his last for the Melbourne Storm, stating he would move to Sydney; Cronk emphasised that this was purely based on family reasons rather than football-related reasons. His then-fiancée Tara Rushton, a Fox sports presenter based in Sydney, was the main driver behind his decision. On 30 October 2017 it was announced that he would join the Sydney Roosters for two seasons. Cronk and Rushton married on 14 December 2017.

2018

In 2018 Cooper Cronk joined the Sydney Roosters. Where he played all 26 games, including playing with a broken scapula in the grand final victory over his former club the Melbourne Storm. He then became the first player to win consecutive premierships with two different clubs in the NRL era, having won the 2017 Grand Final with Melbourne and 2018 Grand Final with the Roosters starting at halfback in both games.

2019

On 28 September 2019, Cronk led the Sydney Roosters to a 14–6 win over his former club Melbourne Storm in the preliminary final. After the game, Cronk was full of praise for his former coach Craig Bellamy and the Storm. "It’s hard because I don’t stand here today without the people at the Melbourne Storm," Cronk said after the game. "Craig’s forefront of that, he’s a guy I’ve played a lot of football for. "It’s really emotional sometimes coming up against your old team but in this game, you really have to put it to the side because there’s always a chance of next week and you really have to ride the rollercoaster sometimes".

Winning consecutive premierships is a feat that had not been achieved in 26 years, and Cronk created history by becoming the first player in the modern era to win three consecutive grand finals and to have four consecutive grand final appearances.

On 6 October 2019, Cooper Cronk played his final game of Rugby League in the NRL for the Sydney Roosters in the 2019 NRL Grand Final. Prior to his last match, the only thing he had not managed to achieve is back-to-back titles with the same club. He did that, and set the record for three consecutive grand finals in the modern era, furthermore Cronk was the first player in the NRL era to have won three consecutive premierships, additionally is one of thirteen players who have won consecutive Premierships. Cronk was revered by the Rugby League community for his achievements within the game, to win four NRL Grand Finals from nine games.

During the press conference, coach Trent Robinson labelled the retiree the "greatest thinker to ever play rugby league". "It’s hard to explain how great Cooper is", Robinson said. "I'm a better coach because Cooper is here. We are a better club and a better team because Cooper is here. We asked him to come and do a job and he said, 'I'm going to come, I'm going to get it done.'"I think he is the greatest thinker to ever play rugby league. To walk onto the field and do what he's done in our game – the guy is skilful but my left-to-right (pass) is better than Cooper's.

In Cronk's final interview, he laughed 'he had enough'.

== Post playing ==
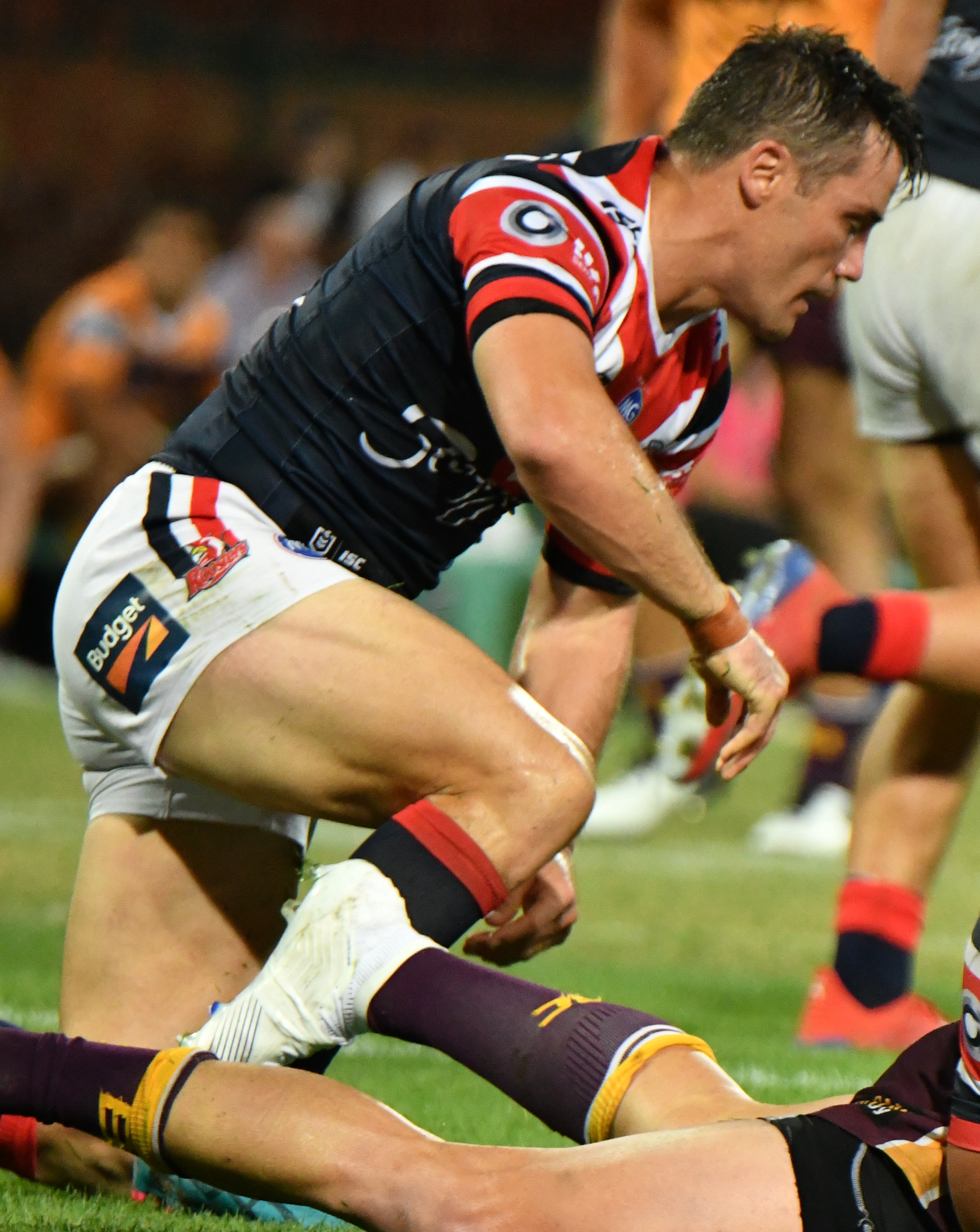
Cronk playing for the Roosters in 2019

=== AFL coaching ===
On 7 November 2019, Cronk was recruited into AFL club GWS Giants as a 'leadership consultant'. The move was initiated by Jimmy Bartel and was officially confirmed by their coach, Leon Cameron. Cronk was set to begin his consultancy 2019 in preparation for the Giants' 2020 AFL season.

=== Rugby league coaching ===
Cronk has been employed as a part-time coaching consultant at both the Sydney Roosters and Melbourne Storm, with his role seeing him mentor players at both clubs.

=== Media career ===
"and that's turned this game on its head because the dogs were coming and you wanna know why they call this place the 8th wonder of the world because the crowd was taken out of it the dogs were coming and then there was the penalty that schoupp did with the tackle that went wrong and next minute the crowd went up OFF OFF OFF OFF and from that moment the tigers scored two tries and they've got BACK in their winning ways and look like they're gonna runaround runa runaway with it"

— Cronk's iconic call of the Tigers and Bulldogs game in 2022

Following his retirement from playing in 2019, Cronk has been part of the commentary team on Fox League, where he is seen as part of the broadcaster's on-air panels and analysis.

=== Hall of Fame ===
In August 2024, the National Rugby League announced that Cronk was an inductee into the National Rugby League Hall of Fame. Cronk, who was ascribed Hall of Fame number 124, was amongst eleven male players in the 2024 Class.

== Personal life ==
Cronk married television sports presenter Tara Rushton in December 2017. They have two children.

== Honours ==
=== Individual ===
- Dally M Player of the Year: 2013, 2016
- Dally M Halfback of the Year: 2006, 2011, 2012, 2013, 2016
- Clive Churchill Medal: 2012
- Rugby League World Golden Boot Award: 2016
- National Rugby League Hall of Fame inductee: #124 2024

=== Melbourne Storm ===
- 2006 NRL Grand Final Runner-up
- 2007 NRL Grand Final (Premiership stripped)
- 2008 NRL Grand Final Runner-up
- 2008 World Club Challenge Runner-up
- 2009 NRL Grand Final (Premiership stripped)
- 2011 NRL Minor Premiers
- 2012 NRL Grand Final Winners
- 2013 World Club Challenge Winners
- 2016 NRL Minor Premiers
- 2016 NRL Grand Final Runner-up
- 2017 NRL Minor Premiers
- 2017 NRL Grand Final Winners

=== Sydney Roosters ===
- 2018 NRL Minor Premiership Winners
- 2018 NRL Grand Final Winners
- 2019 World Club Challenge Winners
- 2019 NRL Grand Final Winners
- Sydney Roosters Life Member

=== Queensland ===
- State of Origin Series Wins: 2010, 2011, 2012, 2013, 2015, 2016, 2017

=== Australia ===
- Rugby League World Cup: 2013, 2017
- Rugby League Four Nations: 2011, 2016

=== Career Highlights and Awards ===
- 4× NRL Premiership Winner
- 1× Clive Churchill Medallist
- 2× Dally M Medallist
- 5× Dally M Halfback of the Year
- 1× Rugby League World Golden Boot Award Winner
- 2× World Club Challenge Winner
- 7× State of Origin Winner
- 2× Rugby League Four Nations Winner
- 2× Rugby League World Cup Champion
