= Melbourne Storm =

Australian rugby league football club

Club information
- Full name: Melbourne Storm Rugby League Club Limited
- Nickname: Storm
- Short name: MEL
- Colours: Primary; Purple; Navy; Secondary; White; Gold
- Founded: 23 June 1997; 29 years ago
- Website: melbournestorm.com.au

Current details
- Ground: Melbourne Rectangular Stadium (30,050)
- CEO: Justin Rodski
- Coach: Craig Bellamy
- Captain: Harry Grant
- Competition: National Rugby League
- 2026 season: 10th
- Current season

Uniforms
| Home colours | Away colours |

Records
- Premierships: 4* (1999, ~~2007~~, ~~2009~~, 2012, 2017, 2020)
- Runners-up: 6 (2006, 2008, 2016, 2018, 2024, 2025)
- Minor Premierships: 6* (~~2006~~, ~~2007~~, ~~2008~~, 2011, 2016, 2017, 2019, 2021, 2024)
- World Club Challenge: 3* (2000, ~~2010~~, 2013, 2018)
- Wooden spoons: 1 (2010)
- Most capped: 430 – Cameron Smith
- Highest try scorer: 190 – Billy Slater
- Highest points scorer: 2786 – Cameron Smith

The Melbourne Storm is an Australian rugby league football club based in Melbourne, Victoria, Australia that participates in the National Rugby League (NRL). The club plays its home games at AAMI Park, and wears a purple and navy blue jersey with gold and white trim.

The first fully professional rugby league team in the state, the club was founded in 1997, playing its first season in the newly reunified NRL competition in 1998. They have won four premierships since their inception, in 1999, 2012, 2017 and 2020, and have contested several more grand finals. They also won the 2007 and 2009 grand finals, but were stripped of those premierships following salary cap breaches.

They also competed in the NRL's Under-20s competition (as Melbourne Thunderbolts) from 2008 until its demise in 2017 and in 2018 entered the Victorian Thunderbolts in the Hastings Deering Colts U20s QLD competition. Since 2019, the club has competed in the U21 New South Wales Rugby League competition, the Jersey Flegg Cup, of which it won for the first time in 2025.

In 2024, the Melbourne Storm rugby league club had over 1 million fans.

== History ==
Chart of yearly table positions for Melbourne Storm in First Grade NRL

=== 1997–1999: Establishment and 1st Premiership ===
I've always thought rugby league would be a success in Melbourne. They've got to start down here sometime and the earlier the better. Melburnians love their sport and I'm sure they'd get behind rugby league. But they won't accept rubbish and that's the key to it

— Ron Barassi, 1997

Following record attendances at State of Origin fixtures in Melbourne of 87,161 in 1994 at the Melbourne Cricket Ground, the Australian Rugby League (ARL) had planned to establish a Melbourne-based team in the Premiership by 1998. However, the disruption caused by the Super League war caused great change to the game in Australia. By May 1997, Super League boss John Ribot pushed for a Melbourne-based club for his competition, which was the rival of the ARL. Former Brisbane Broncos centre Chris Johns became the CEO of the club and Ribot stepped down from the head of Super League to set up the club, with head of News Limited Ken Cowley as chairman. In September 1997, Melbourne announced that Chris Anderson would be their foundation coach, and then Super League announced that the new team would be named the Melbourne Storm. Melbourne teenager Cameron Duncan came up with the name Storm and his winning entry was chosen from more than 1000 entries received in a competition run in conjunction with the Herald Sun.

In 1997, there were 21 rugby league teams running around Australia (and one in New Zealand), but none in the country's second-largest city. In 1998, with the game reunited, three clubs had been jettisoned and the Melbourne Storm had bobbed up as an unexpected and initially curious addition to the landscape.

— The Sunday Age, 1999

The Melbourne club then went forward with signing players, mainly from folding Super League clubs Perth Reds and Hunter Mariners. These players included Rodney Howe, Robbie Kearns, Matt Geyer, Paul Bell, Robbie Ross, Glenn Lazarus, Brett Kimmorley and Scott Hill. With the Super League and ARL joining into one competition for the 1998 season, the Melbourne team became part of the National Rugby League (NRL). The Melbourne Storm Rugby League Club was unveiled at a function at the Hyatt Hotel – Melbourne in February 1998.

In their first game, they defeated the Illawarra Steelers, with Glenn Lazarus as their inaugural captain. Melbourne, in a complete shock to the rest of the competition, won their first four games, before losing to the Auckland Warriors (Now known as the New Zealand Warriors) They went on to make the finals, but were defeated by the eventual premiers, the Brisbane Broncos.

In January 1999, Executive Director John Ribot negotiated a deal that saw Melbourne Storm games televised in China every weekend. The club won eight of their first eleven games of the 1999 NRL season, and went on to make the finals in third position on the Premiership ladder. The team was beaten convincingly 34–10 in the quarter final by St. George Illawarra. After narrow victories against the Canterbury Bulldogs and the Parramatta Eels; however, Melbourne once more faced St. George Illawarra in the grand final. The Storm staged a late comeback in the game to win 20–18, securing their first premiership.

=== 2000–2002: Decline and coaching changes ===
Melbourne's Premiership defence began relatively slowly losing their first four games of the 2000 NRL season, the club went on to make the finals (finishing 6th), but were eventually knocked out by Newcastle in the quarter-finals. Between 2001 and 2002, the club's on field performances waned, resulting in a 10th-placed finish in 2002. Cracks were starting to appear between John Ribot and Anderson throughout the period, with Anderson quitting as coach after round 7, 2001. He was replaced by Mark Murray. The Melbourne club failed to make the finals in 2001. Johns left the club as CEO at the end of 2002 and coach Murray was sacked due to Melbourne's poor form, with the club missing the finals for the second year in a row.

=== 2003–2006: Craig Bellamy era begins – return to the top ===
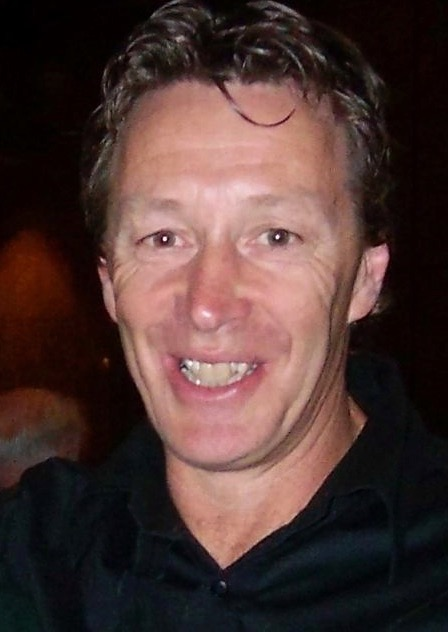
Craig Bellamy: Coach of the Melbourne Storm.

Wayne Bennett's assistant coach at the Brisbane Broncos, Craig Bellamy was announced as the new coach of Melbourne for 2003, and in addition, a new captain in Kiwi international skipper Stephen Kearney. Bellamy's strict coaching had an almost immediate effect and saw the Melbourne Storm get back on track from the previous lean years.

Now, the Melbourne Storm are here to stay. They are not moving and News Limited is apparently committed to keeping them financially. I am OK with that. I hated Melbourne when they were in place of traditional teams that were expelled, but that's all over now. If they want to persevere in Melbourne, I have no argument.

— Phil Gould, 21 December 2003

Between 2003 and 2005, Melbourne consistently made the finals, but lost games in the semi-finals which prevented them from reaching the grand final. This period also saw the arrival and rise of young Queenslanders Billy Slater, Cameron Smith and Cooper Cronk. Unheard of at the start of 2003, the steady hooker and dummy-half Smith provided solid support to existing established players in Matt Orford and his forwards and also provided supporters with confidence of the club's future. A notable incident that occurred during 2004 was the 18-game suspension of Danny Williams following a king-hit on Wests Tigers' player Mark O'Neill. It was the longest suspension in Australian rugby league since 1987.

By 2005, Storm coach Craig Bellamy, in his third season as an NRL coach, gained representative honours when he was selected to start coaching the Country Origin team.

Season 2006 saw the retirement of captain Robbie Kearns and the emergence of talented rookie halfback Cooper Cronk who took over the position from Matt Orford and in addition, the recruitment of hard-man Michael Crocker. The club also moved away from a single captain, electing to use a rotating captains policy, including Cameron Smith for the first time. Contrary to expectation, 2006 was a standout year for the Melbourne team, finishing on top of the ladder for the first time. Melbourne only lost four games in the season, making them outright leaders by four wins. They went on to win their two finals matches, and were favourites in the 2006 NRL Grand Final, but lost 15–8 to the Brisbane Broncos, in a match where controversial refereeing decisions against Melbourne caused much media coverage.

=== 2007–2010: Finals success and club turmoil ===
In 2007, the Storm finished the season on top of the table for the second year in a row. They progressed through the finals series with wins over Brisbane, 40–0, and then Parramatta 26–10, in the preliminary final. This secured a berth in the 2007 NRL Grand Final against the Manly-Warringah Sea Eagles which they won 34–8, with Greg Inglis winning the Clive Churchill Medal for best on ground.

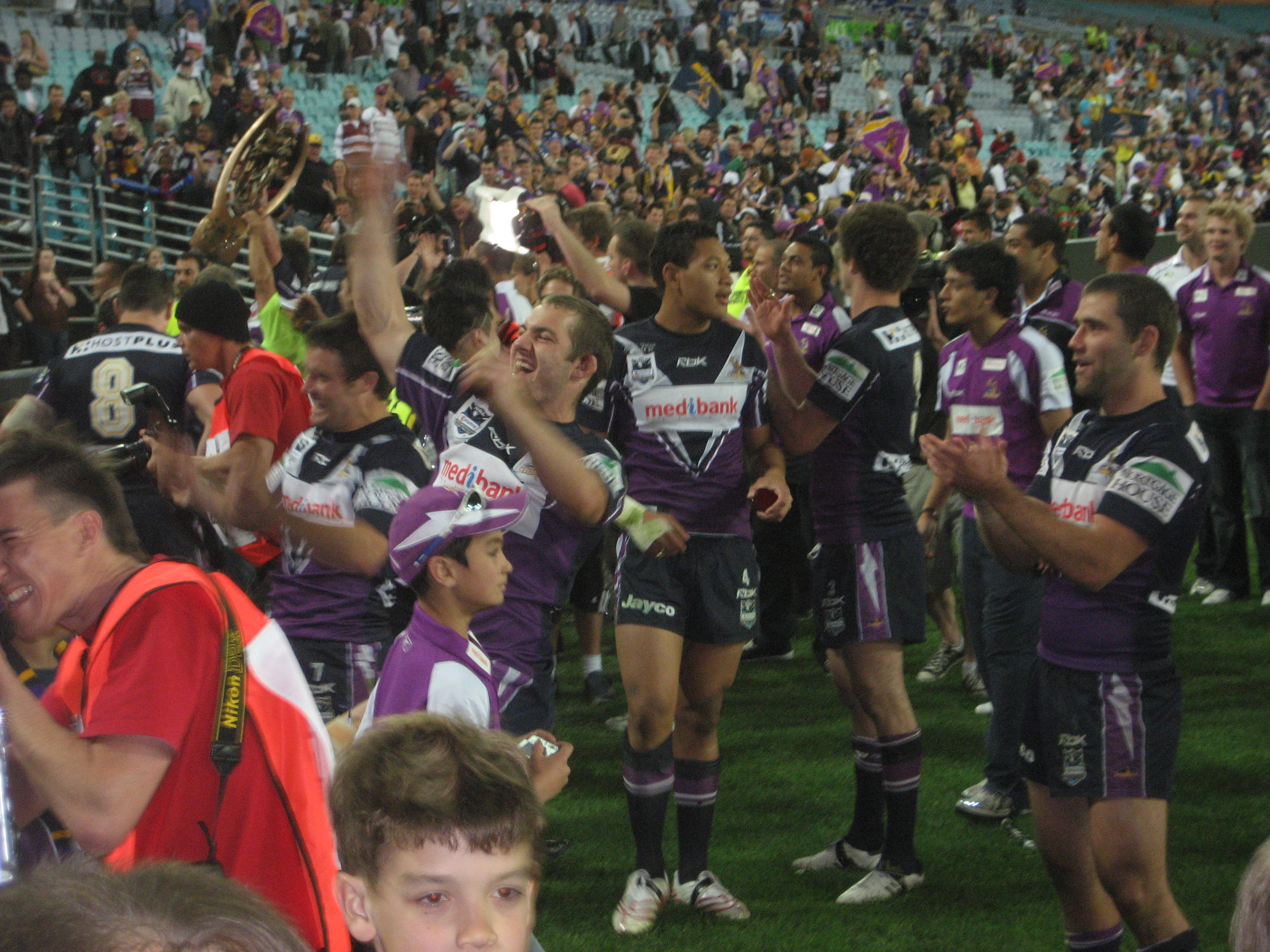
Storm players celebrating their Premiership win in 2007 (later disqualified by NRL)

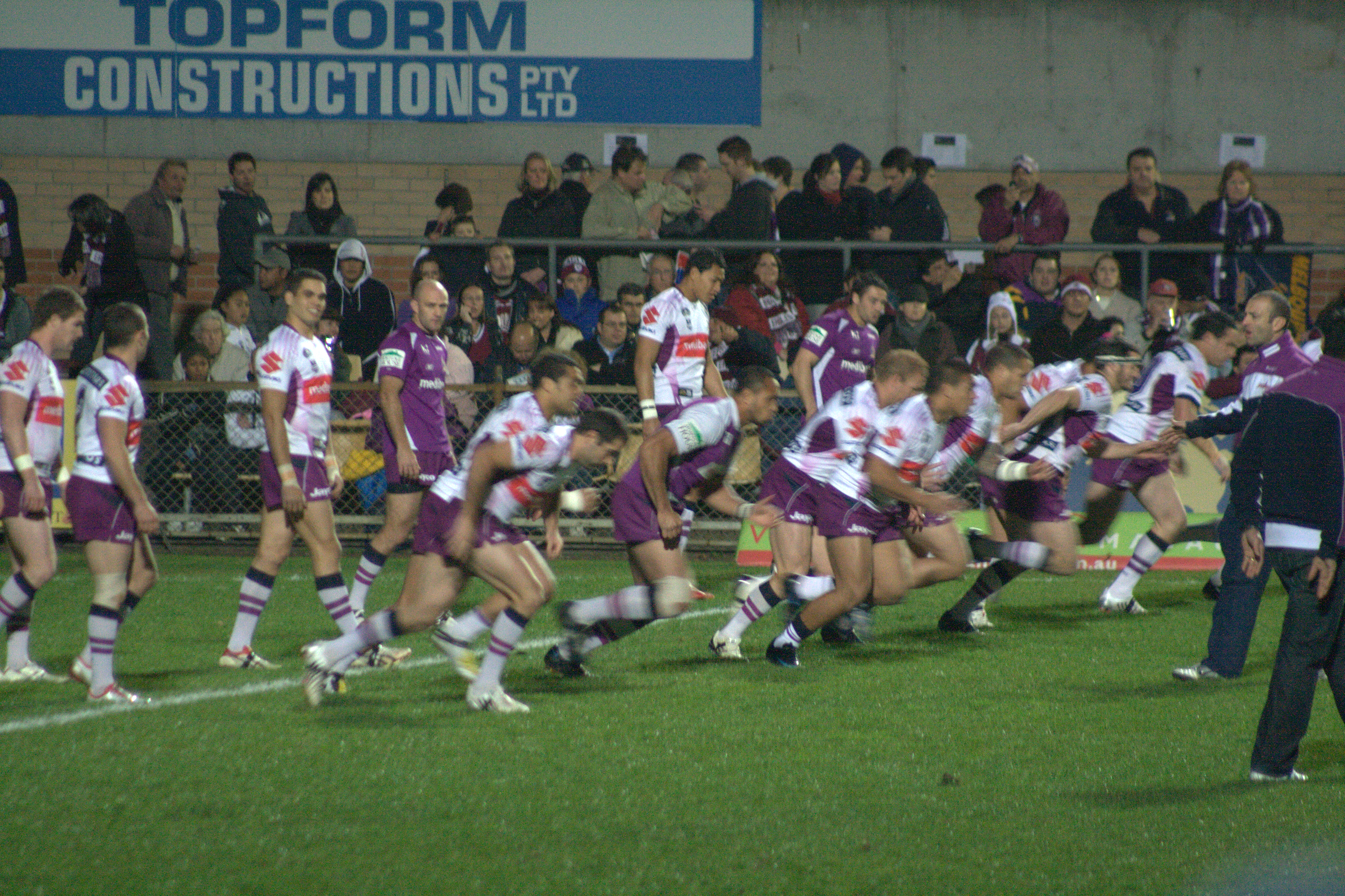
Melbourne Storm warming up before a match in 2008

In 2008, foundation player Matt Geyer became the first player to play 250 games for the club. Melbourne finished on top of the ladder after the 26 rounds of regular competition and despite becoming the first minor premiers since the McIntyre final eight system was introduced to lose their opening finals game (15–18 to the New Zealand Warriors), they then defeated the Brisbane Broncos 16–14, scoring in the last minute of their semi-final. Cameron Smith was suspended for two matches for a grapple tackle on Brisbane's Sam Thaiday in the match, seeing him miss the rest of the finals, and Craig Bellamy was fined $50,000 for making scathing remarks against the judiciary's decision. Melbourne convincingly beat the Cronulla-Sutherland Sharks 28–0 to qualify for the grand final, but suffered the heaviest Grand Final defeat in league history, beaten 40–0 by Manly. Greg Inglis, Billy Slater, Cameron Smith and Israel Folau all won awards at the Dally M Awards, and Slater and Smith finished equal second for the Dally M Medal. Billy Slater was awarded the international player of the year Golden Boot award for 2008, following on from Cameron Smith in 2007.

In the 2009 season, Melbourne finished 4th on the ladder; they defeated Manly 40–12 in the first week of the finals and Brisbane 40–10 in the preliminary finals to qualify for a fourth straight grand final (the first since Parramatta from 1981 to 1984). Against Parramatta, who had finished eighth in the home-and-away season but had won ten of its last eleven matches, the Storm led at one stage by 16 points, before finishing 23–16 winners. Slater won the Clive Churchill Medal, and they were named as the NRL Team of the Decade for the 2000s. In the late 2000s the Melbourne Storm were still running at a loss of up to $6M per season, however despite this, they were voted the state of Victoria's most popular sports team by a national Roy Morgan Poll in October 2009.

In 2010, a number of changes were made to senior management of the club, firstly Brian Waldron resigned his position as CEO to take up the same position at the Melbourne Rebels Super Rugby team, he was replaced by Chief Operating Officer, Matt Hanson. In April, following the salary cap revelations, Matt Hanson was then stood down and Ron Gauci appointed.

On field, the Storm's first match of the season was the 2010 World Club Challenge against equally dominant English side, the Leeds Rhinos; in very cold and wet conditions the Storm prevailed 18 – 10.

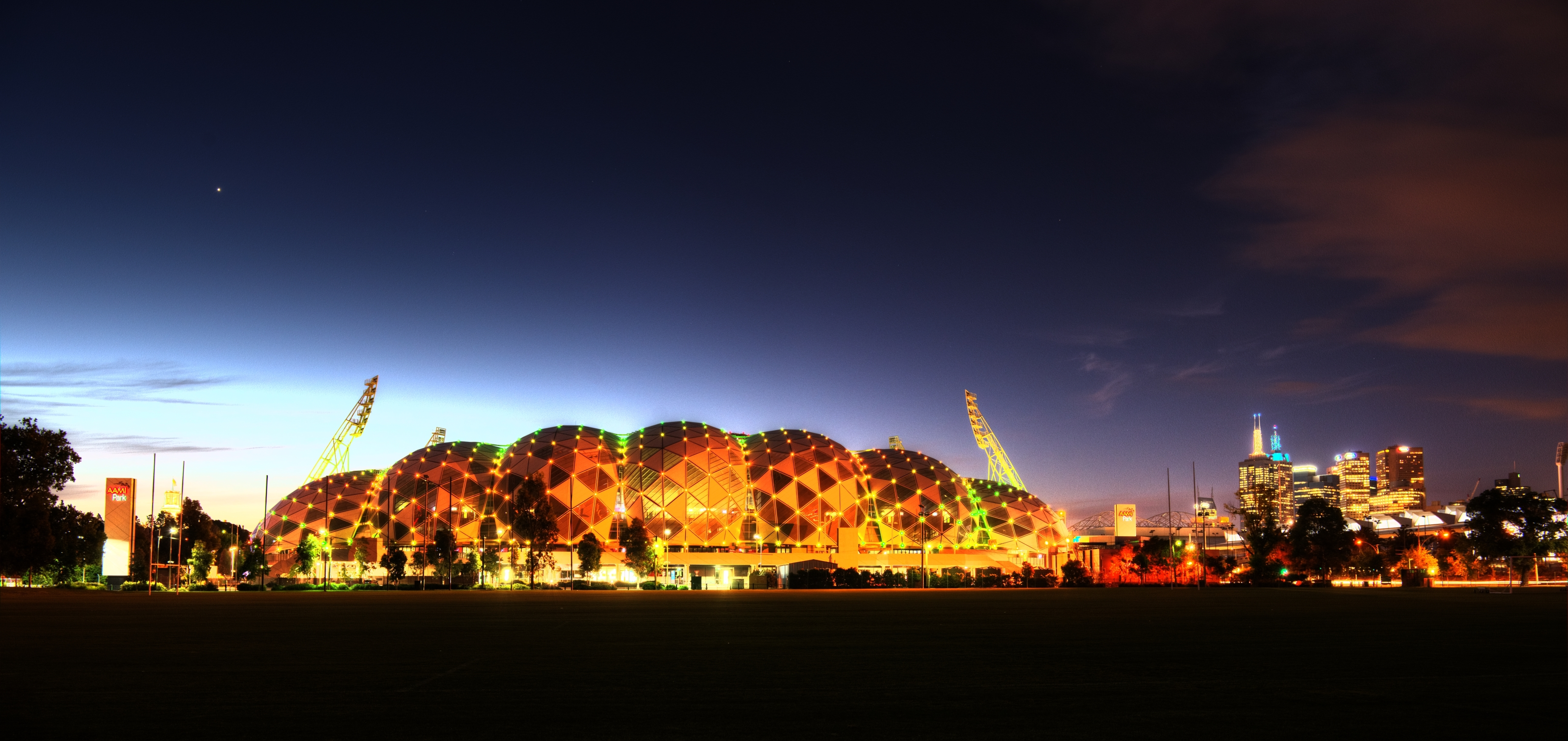
The Storm's home ground from 2010, AAMI Park

On 22 April 2010 the club admitted that it had breached the NRL's salary cap. The NRL estimated the breach to be in excess of $1.7 million over five years. As a result of the breach, NRL Chief Executive David Gallop stripped the club of all titles earned in this period including their 2007 and 2009 premierships, three minor premierships between 2006–08, heavily fined the club, deducted all premiership points earned to that point of the season and barred them from receiving any more for the rest of the season. The club ended up winning enough matches to make the finals, but automatically finished in last place due to the penalties. Melbourne did have something to celebrate in 2010 with the opening of their new home ground AAMI Park in May. The stadium was expected to be used right from the beginning of the season, however, construction delays postponed the opening.

=== 2011–2012: Rebuild and Premiership success ===
Following the salary cap scandal, the club needed to shed a number of players and rebuild. They managed this successfully and over the next two years the Storm returned to the top of the ladder. In 2011 the club won what, after the salary cap penalties, was considered the club's first Minor Premiership and that season also included a club record twelve consecutive wins, however, Melbourne fell just short the grand final, losing the preliminary final against New Zealand. At the 2011 Dally M Awards night, Billy Slater won the Dally M Medal, with Craig Bellamy and Cameron Smith also winning Coach of the year and Captain of the year respectively.

In 2012 the club started very strongly with nine consecutive wins, the club's best start to a season up to that time. A five-game losing streak between Rounds 16 and 21 (the club's second worst losing streak to that time) saw them fall from the top of the ladder. However, from Round 22 forward they recovered their winning form and finished the regular season with five straight wins, ending the regular season in second place on the table. Storm began their finals campaign with a 24–6 win over South Sydney Rabbitohs. Storm played its fifth Preliminary Final in six years, this time defeating Manly-Warringah Sea Eagles 40–12 at AAMI Park. Following this they went on to claim their second official Premiership defeating the Canterbury-Bankstown Bulldogs 14 – 4 in the Grand Final.

=== 2013–2017: World Champions, Milestones and 3rd Premiership ===
The Storm began its 2013 season with a trip to England where they defeated the Leeds Rhinos 18–14 in the World Club Challenge, to be crowned World Champions. Upon their return to Australia, the Storm began the home and away season where it left off in 2012 winning their first seven games, this combined with games won in late 2012 set a new club record for the most consecutive wins, with the streak ending at 15 games with a loss in Round 8. On 21 May 2013 the Storm announced that, News Limited had sold the club to Holding M.S. Australia Pty Limited, an organisation made up of internationally experienced and successful businessmen. This change included replacement of the News Ltd Board and Executive, which included the replacement of Chairman Stephen Rue with Bart Campbell and CEO Ron Gauci with Mark Evans. News Limited had owned the Storm since its inception in 1997. On 9 June 2013 Captain Cameron Smith played his 250th game for the club. The Storm managed to finish 3rd in 2013; however, successive losses to the South Sydney Rabbitohs and Newcastle Knights in the finals saw the Storm miss the Preliminary Finals for the first time since 2005 (excluding 2010).

The 2014 season saw a number of milestones achieved, both Billy Slater and Cooper Cronk played their 250th games and Craig Bellamy reached 300 games as coach. In mid 2014 the Storm also announced a new feeder partnership with the Sunshine Coast Falcons. This would complement their existing relationship with Brisbane Easts with a view to establishing a permanent footprint in the Sunshine Coast Area.

2015 began successfully for the Storm with the club finding itself on top of the ladder by Round 7. In April Storm CEO Mark Evans announced that he was returning to England and completed his tenure as CEO in June of that year. Dave Donaghy was announced as his replacement. In round 19 a major milestone was achieved with Cameron smith playing his 300th game becoming only the 24th player in history to do so. In August 2015 the storm announced that they would create an academy on the Sunshine Coast to develop and nurture developing talent in the region with a view to progressing through the Storm ranks. Part of the establishment of this academy meant that the Melbourne Storm Under 20s Team would play all of its home games at the new facility from 2016 onward.

The 2016 season began well for the Storm finding themselves in third place on the ladder after 10 rounds. In Round 5 they scored their 300th NRL win and in Round 9, Craig Bellamy coached his 350th NRL game. On 23 May the Melbourne Storm announced that it had been one of three successful bidders and the only NRL club to gain a licence to field a Netball side in a new expanded Australian Netball League to commence in 2017. The Melbourne club were nominated by Netball Australia as a preferred bidder for one of three new team licences under their expansion plans and on 17 August 2016 it was announced that the new team will be called Sunshine Coast Lightning and be based on the Sunshine Coast at the Storm sports Academy and in effect be a second Queensland Team. The announcement is to establish the Storm as not just a Rugby League club but a sporting and community club.

"Melbourne Storm have partnered with the University of the Sunshine Coast for this project and we're both very proud and excited to have reached the preferred bidder stage for a licence in the new National Netball League,"

— Dave Donaghy, 2016

At the conclusion of the 2016 NRL season Melbourne finished in first place claiming their second legitimate Minor Premiership. They qualified for the NRL Finals series winning their first two finals and thus making it through to the 2016 NRL Grand Final against the Cronulla-Sutherland Sharks. The game was a very hard-fought match, as the game hung in the balance until the dying second but the Cronulla side hung on to win.

2017 was another successful year for the Melbourne Storm, the club's 20th season in the NRL. Following on from the heartbreak of losing the grand final in 2016, the club went from strength to strength recruiting well in the off season and dominated the 2017 NRL season to finish in first place earning them their third legitimate minor premiership. Melbourne won 20 and lost four games throughout the season making it their most dominant season in 10 years. Cameron Smith also broke a number of league, club and personal records throughout the 2017 season including the NRL games record for the most games played, league record for the most wins as a captain, a personal best for the most points in a game and also scored his 2000th career point and 1000th career goal, the first time any player has achieved this. The Storm continued their success into the 2017 NRL finals and won their first two, a home Qualifying final against the Parramatta Eels 18–16 and a home Preliminary Final against Brisbane 30–0 to qualify them for their second consecutive Grand Final. The 2017 NRL Grand Final was played against the North Queensland Cowboys, which Melbourne dominated to earn them their 3rd official Premiership 34–6. Billy Slater won his second Clive Churchill medal. In December 2017, the NRL announced the formation of a women's competition with Melbourne Storm expressing their interest in applying for a licence to participate in the inaugural NRL Women's season.

=== 2018–2022: 20th anniversary and 4th premiership ===
Following the club's premiership in 2017, the Storm hosted the 2018 World Club Challenge at AAMI Park in February and also defeated the Leeds Rhinos to win the title 38–4. 2018 was also a special year for the club as it celebrated its 20th anniversary and in March announced their team of the first 20 years during a gala evening at Crown Casino. Continuing on from the success in 2017, the Storm once again played very well throughout the year ultimately being pipped for the Minor Premiership on points difference. The Storm once again made the grand final, however, lost to the Sydney Roosters to end the season runner-up.

In 2019, the club returned to the top of the table, winning the Minor Premiership finishing six points ahead of the Sydney Roosters, however, their finals campaign was not as successful with ultimately exiting the finals after a defeat in the preliminary final once again to the Roosters. Club captain Cameron Smith also achieved a number of significant milestones throughout the 2019 season, including captaining his 300th game, becoming the game's highest points scorer and also playing his 400th NRL game – the first NRL player to do so.

The Storm were looking to continue their success into 2020 but 2020 became somewhat of an extraordinary year. The global COVID-19 pandemic hit Australia in late February forcing all games behind closed doors and then a total suspension and reorganization of the season. After the situation in Victoria deteriorated in June, the Storm were forced to relocate to the Sunshine Coast in Queensland to complete their season. Melbourne would go on to finish second on the table at the end of the 2020 regular season behind Minor Premiers Penrith, before beating Penrith in the 2020 NRL Grand Final to win their fourth official premiership, and cementing their status as one of the most successful clubs of the modern NRL era.

In 2021, long term captain Cameron Smith announced his retirement after 430 game and both Jesse Bromwich and Dale Finucane were announced as co-captains. On-field, the Melbourne club had some early hiccups adjusting to life after Smith, however, from round four, began a winning streak that lasted until Round 23 – 19 consecutive wins, becoming the first team since the Sydney Roosters in 1975 to complete this feat. This was made all the more remarkable because for the second consecutive season the club were forced to once again relocate to Queensland from Round 9 onwards due to COVID-19 outbreaks in NSW and Victoria. The winning run helped them to win the Minor Premiership finishing in first place at the end of the season, however the club failed to make the grand final losing the preliminary final to Penrith. The club also broke a number of other points scoring records throughout the season including finishing with the highest ever points differential (499 points). Individually, Josh Addo-Carr also scored a club record six tries in a single game against South Sydney.

Melbourne started the 2022 NRL season strongly winning seven of their opening eight matches with their only defeat coming against Parramatta. In round 10 however, Melbourne were defeated 32–6 by Premiers Penrith. The following week, Melbourne suffered their biggest loss in the competition since round 18 of the 2013 NRL season when they were defeated 36–6 by North Queensland. In round 18 of the 2022 NRL season, Melbourne were defeated 20–16 by Canberra which meant they had lost three straight matches for the first time since the 2015 NRL season. Melbourne would finish the 2022 regular season in fifth place on the table which was their lowest finish since the 2014 NRL season. In the elimination final, Melbourne were upset 28–20 by Canberra which ended their season.

From 2017 through 2025 the owners of the club had expanded into netball forming a joint venture with the University of the Sunshine Coast to enter the Sunshine Coast Lightning in the Super Netball competition. The club had taken full ownership of the Lightning in November 2021 until they were sold to new owners in September 2025.

In the 2024 and 2025 NRL seasons, the club reached the grand final but lost to Penrith and Brisbane respectively. In August 2026 EQT purchased a majority shareholding in the club. Melbourne started the 2026 NRL season as one of the favourites for the premiership however they endured one of their worst ever seasons finishing 10th on the table which meant the club missed the finals for the first time since 2002. At one stage Melbourne had lost a club record seven straight matches.

== Emblem and colours ==
=== Name ===
Originally, the club favoured the name Melbourne Mavericks with a gunslinger logo holding a fistful of dollars. The club officials were all set to go with this until News Limited's Lachlan Murdoch told them to go with something else because the Mavericks sounded too American. Trams and Flying Foxes were also some ideas that came up. However, CEO Chris Johns and Executive Director John Ribot decided to go with the themes of lightning, power and following a naming competition, the club eventually settled on the name Melbourne Storm. Melbourne teenager Cameron Duncan came up with the name "Storm", with his winning entry chosen from more than 1000 received.

=== Colours ===

The Storm were always going to go with the colours of their state, Victoria (navy blue with a white 'V'), but club consultant at the time, Peter McWhirter of the JAG fashion house, suggested that they should also have purple and gold to make their merchandise more attractive. Therefore, the official colours of the Storm are navy blue and purple (main colours) and white and yellow (minor colours).

All four of these colours appeared in the logo until yellow was removed in 2018. In the home jersey, the colours have varied over the years. Between 1998 and 2004 these four colours appeared on various designs but between 2005 and 2009, gold was completely removed and silver introduced. Between 2010 and 2012, gold returned, silver was omitted and purple became the dominant colour in the jersey. For 2013 a new design was announced featuring a deeper V, with more navy blue in the jersey. Gold disappeared again along with most of the white, and the lightning bolts were changed to purple. During 2015 the jersey changed again, for the first time not featuring a V at all, but the V returned somewhat along with the lightning bolts in 2016 with a manufacturer change. In 2018 and 19 the club wore a traditional V uniform and all colours were present, however, for 2020 the jersey has returned to an all navy blue and purple jersey.

Between 1998 and 2001, Melbourne was the only club to display player names on the back of jerseys. This was because there was no major sponsor for the Storm to display on the chest or back at the time. It also helped supporters new to the game identify the players. In 2001, Melbourne gained its first major sponsor in Adecco, which was displayed on the jersey chest, while maintaining the players' names on the back until the end of 2001. In 2002, the Storm removed the players' names and displayed Adecco's logo on the back. Since then the Storm have had varying sponsors adorning the jersey.

=== Logo ===
The club's original logo of "Storm Man" riding over storm clouds and throwing a bolt of lightning was in place from the club's inception through to the end of the 2017 season. The only variation to this was when an informal logo for the 10th Anniversary was produced however this was only featured on supporter merchandise and not in an official capacity on the jersey. As part of the club's 20th Anniversary, the Storm introduced a new logo used throughout the 2018 season. The logo was a shield based logo with the storm man featured above the words "Melbourne Storm 20 Years". As the celebrations concluded, the club rebranded and replaced the 20th Anniversary logo with another new logo. The current Logo is a derivation of the 20-year logo featuring no shield and a more bold "Melbourne Storm" and the club has also dropped the colour Yellow from the logo. There is also a second official version of this logo in all white which features on the home jersey.

Melbourne Storm – Logos

1998—2017

2007

2018

== Club song ==
The Melbourne Storm have a number of club songs that are either played over the PA system or exclusively sung by the players at each game. The main song, which was written by Jon Mol and Phil Wall, is called "We Are the Storm" and is played over the public address system following each home victory. In addition, AC/DC song "Thunderstruck" is played at every home game as the team enter the stadium. Lastly, after each victory, the Storm players also sing "We are the mighty Melbourne Storm" in the dressing rooms. The song is sung to the same tune as the US Marines' Hymn.

== Rivalries ==
=== St. George Illawarra Dragons ===
The St. George Illawarra and Melbourne rivalry was at its highest in the years following the 1999 NRL Grand Final. In this game, Melbourne narrowly beat St. George Illawarra, with a late penalty try putting the Melbourne club in front. The following year, Anthony Mundine declared that the Melbourne side were not "worthy premiers" in the run up to their round 5 rematch. Melbourne responded by belting St. George Illawarra 70–10.

However, later that season, St. George Illawarra had a large win defeating Melbourne 50–4. In 2006, Melbourne and St. George Illawarra once again met in a Preliminary Final which Melbourne won. On 21 July 2008, Melbourne won at Olympic Park 26–0, in a match highlighted by several ugly brawls.

In 2009, the Melbourne club defeated St. George Illawarra 17–16 in Round 1 with a field goal in Golden Point extra time.

In recent years, this rivalry has somewhat diminished.

=== Brisbane Broncos ===
The Melbourne Storm has a rivalry with Brisbane, built in large part on the large number of finals games played between the teams, including one final in each year from 2004 to 2009, with the Melbourne club winning all but one of them. The move of Brisbane assistant coach Craig Bellamy to Melbourne has also been attributed to fueling the rivalry, as well as the wide spread of Queensland Origin players across their squads in the better part of the past decade.

"When Bellamy left here and went to Melbourne, the rivalry with them went up a notch then... their record is good against us."

— Darren Lockyer, 26 September 2009

Every year since Brisbane's victory over Melbourne in the 2006 Grand Final, Melbourne have ended Brisbane's season by knocking them out of the finals. Melbourne captain Cameron Smith commented on the rivalry prior to their 2009 Preliminary Final at Etihad Stadium.

"A lot of people talk about us and Manly, but I think all the boys for whatever reason would say we take more satisfaction out of beating the Broncos...we love playing them...there is always plenty of feeling and intensity in the games...it probably wouldn't feel like September if we weren't playing them at some stage."

— Cameron Smith, 26 September 2009

The Brisbane Broncos defeated Melbourne 15–8 in the 2006 NRL Grand Final. Melbourne sought revenge through a 40–0 thrashing in the 2007 Qualifying Final at Olympic Park Stadium. The 2008 Semi-Final at Suncorp Stadium ended with Melbourne dramatically winning 16–14 with a try on the final play of the game. In 2009, Brisbane were again beaten by eventual premiers Melbourne, this time 40–10 at Etihad Stadium, catapulting the Melbourne club to their 4th consecutive Grand Final Appearance. In 2017, the two sides met in the preliminary final where Melbourne defeated Brisbane 30–0. Since the 2006 Grand Final, Melbourne have only lost to Brisbane five times across 36 matches.

In round 27 of the 2023 NRL season, the two sides met in the final round of the regular campaign. Brisbane and Melbourne both rested several players as each team had qualified for the finals. Melbourne would go on to win the game 32–22 which denied Brisbane their first Minor Premiership since the 2000 NRL season. The two sides met the following week in the 2023 qualifying final with Brisbane defeating Melbourne 26–0 to book a place in the preliminary final. It was the first time Brisbane had beaten Melbourne at Suncorp Stadium since 2009 and the first time that they had defeated Melbourne in 14 attempts. The two sides would meet in the 2025 NRL Grand Final. Melbourne lead the match 22–12 at half-time but conceded 14 unanswered points to lose 26–22.

=== Manly-Warringah Sea Eagles ===
The origin of the rivalry stems back the period between 2007 and 2012 when both clubs were consistently at the top of the table.

In the 2007 NRL Grand Final, Melbourne defeated Manly 34–8 and then the following year in the 2008 NRL Grand Final, lost to the Manly club 40 nil. The following season the clubs once again met in the finals series and this time it was Melbourne who ended Manly-Warringah's season, and their bid for back to back titles, with a 40–12 defeat in the 2009 qualifying final.

I haven't been a part of the matches previous to this year which built that rivalry but you certainly get a sense that interest in the game and the level of excitement and enthusiasm from the players goes up",

— Brett Finch, 8 September 2009.

In 2011 the rivalry escalated when another major chapter was written in what became known as the "Battle of Brookvale". This game involved a massive brawl that began on the field and then continued as the two key players involved were being sent off. The melee ultimately involved interchange players and officials from both clubs as well. What made this worse was that the match was attended by then CEO of the NRL David Gallop who condemned the actions of both clubs.

The sight of so many players from both teams fighting, of people running in and leaving the bench area, was a horrendous look for the game.

— David Gallop

In the years following this match, matches between Manly-Warringah and Melbourne played at Brookvale Oval continued to often be called the "Battle of Brookvale", though there have not been any particularly violent matches between the two sides at this venue since.

In 2012, there was a similar scenario as 2009 when the clubs met in the Preliminary Final, Melbourne again defeated Manly 40–12, again ending their chances of winning back-to-back titles after the Manly-Warringah club won the title in 2011.

The matches between the two sides simmered over the next decade, however, in the 2021 NRL Finals Series the two clubs once again met, this time a Qualifying Final, Melbourne again defeated Manly and curiously, the score line was again 40–12, the third time this had occurred.

=== New Zealand Warriors ===
This is more of a traditional game due to the large number of Kiwi internationals Melbourne has fielded in their history. Matches between the two clubs are normally close and low scoring, with the overall head to head (as of 2020) in Melbourne's favour (45 clashes, Melbourne 27 – Warriors 16 and 2 draws). These two sides played an annual ANZAC Day clash each year between 2009 and 2014. In 2015 it was not scheduled so the Warriors could celebrate the 100th anniversary of ANZAC Day at home. From 2016 onwards (with the exception of 2020), it has been played on every ANZAC Day since. Both teams play for the Michael Moore Trophy.

The two sides have met each other twice in the finals series. The first being in week one of the 2008 finals series where New Zealand pulled off one of the biggest finals upsets defeating Melbourne 18–15. New Zealand had finished the season in eighth whilst Melbourne had finished as Minor Premiers. In 2011, the two clubs met in the preliminary final where Melbourne was defeated by New Zealand in a major upset, thus falling one match short of the 2011 NRL Grand Final.

=== Sydney Roosters ===
This competitive rivalry began in the 2017 NRL season when the two clubs met in Round 16 at the Adelaide Oval. The Sydney Roosters won a very tight game in Golden Point 25–24 then only seven weeks later, Melbourne won the return game 16–13 at AAMI Park. In this game, the Sydney Roosters were leading 13–12 after 73 minutes after kicking a field goal before Joe Stimson scored a late try to steal the win just before full time. The competitive nature with the Sydney Roosters increased in the off season when long time player Cooper Cronk announced that he was moving to Sydney and joining the club for 2018.

In the 2018 premiership season, the two clubs only played one game, again at the Adelaide Oval. It was another tight game which this time Melbourne won 9–8 with Cameron Smith kicking a late field goal to snatch victory. The two clubs remained neck and neck at the top of the table with the Sydney Roosters pipping Melbourne for the minor premiership on points difference. The two clubs did not meet until the 2018 NRL Grand Final with the Sydney Roosters winning 21–6. In the game, Cooper Cronk playing injured, assumed a virtual on-field player-coach role, using his years of Grand Final experience to help the Roosters defeat the Melbourne side.

In 2019, the teams clashed twice during the season and both games were close. On Good Friday the Roosters defeated Melbourne 21–20 in Golden point overtime before the teams met once again in Adelaide, with Melbourne prevailing 14–12. The third clash of the year was the preliminary final, which the Sydney Roosters won 14–6 at the SCG.

With the 2020 NRL season disrupted by the COVID-19 pandemic, Melbourne's Round 8 "home" game against the Roosters was transferred to Suncorp Stadium in Brisbane. In a game that produced one of the more extraordinary finishes to an NRL game, the Roosters were leading 22–12 with 12 minutes left when Melbourne then scored two tries to take a 24–22 lead. The game was then tied up by a penalty goal to the Roosters before they also scored a 78th minute field goal to lead 25–24. With seconds remaining, Melbourne's Ryan Papenhuyzen scored a field goal of his own to tie scores up again at 25 all and send the game into Golden Point. Melbourne won the game with Cameron Smith kicking a penalty goal.

As of the end of the 2021 NRL season, the clubs met a further three times with Melbourne winning all three games including defeating the Roosters 46–0 in round 16 of the 2021 season.

The fixture re-ignited in 2022 in round 24 when the Sydney Roosters narrowly defeated Melbourne 18–14 after the Roosters lead 14–0. It was a particularly spiteful game that included repeat melees and sin bins for players on both sides. Sydney Roosters player Jared Waerea-Hargreaves was sin binned following the referee repeatedly warning both sides to fall in line. The game also came on the back of Hooker, Brandon Smith, transferring to the club for the 2023 season. The two sides met in the second week of the 2023 NRL finals series. Melbourne were heavy favourites going into the game but with only minutes remaining the Sydney Roosters were in front 13–12. This was until with three minutes to go Melbourne scored a try through William Warbrick to win the match 18–13. The match wasn't without controversy due to Melbourne scoring a try in the first half which came directly after Harry Grant had knocked the ball on from a cross-field kick.

=== Penrith Panthers ===
This rivalry began in the last round of 2018 when Penrith beat Melbourne 22–16 in Melbourne, denying the Victorian side from winning the minor premiership that year. Prior to this match Penrith had a very poor record against Melbourne, only defeating them once out of their previous eighteen matches dating back to the beginning of 2006.

However, since 2020, the matches intensified, starting from the 2020 NRL Grand Final where Melbourne won 26–20, ending Penrith's 17-game winning streak. In 2021, they played each other twice, including a close encounter in Round 3 where Penrith hung on to win 12–10 in an entertaining game. They met again in the preliminary finals where Penrith won 10–6 the week before they went on to beat South Sydney in the 2021 NRL Grand Final. In 2023, they would meet again in the preliminary finals, with Penrith winning comfortably 38–4.

In 2024, they played each other twice in the regular season with Melbourne winning both encounters, the first encounter they won 8–0 in round 1 and the second encounter they won 24–22, denying Penrith the chance to win the minor premiership in 2024. The two teams met again in the Grand Final where Penrith won 14–6.

== Stadium and attendances ==
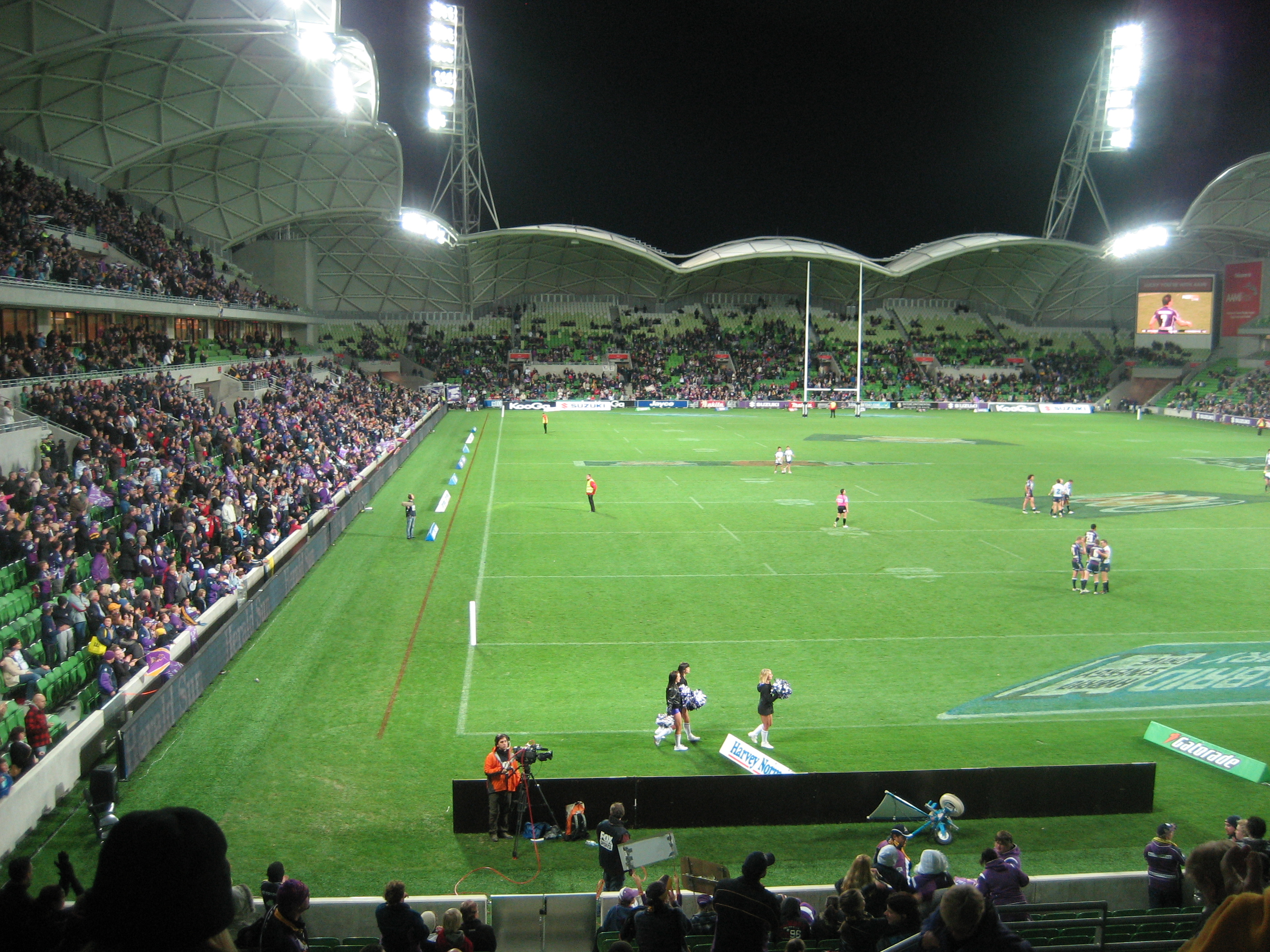
Inside the Storm's home ground, AAMI Park

Melbourne's current home ground is AAMI Park and has been since the 2010 season. Prior to this the club played the vast majority of their home matches at the city's now demolished Olympic Park Stadium, which was located next door. Affectionately coined "The Graveyard" by fans due to the incredible 77.2% winning percentage there, it was there that the club played their inaugural home match in the fourth round of the 1998 season on 3 April 1998, having come off the back of three successive away victories. The team recorded a 26–16 victory over the North Sydney Bears, and the crowd of 20,522 was the largest attendance for the club at Olympic Park.

It was also at this time that Melbourne Storm helped set a Rugby League World record attendance figure of 107,999. This was during the 1999 NRL Grand final, held at Stadium Australia where they defeated the St George Illawarra Dragons, to win their first NRL premiership. As the ground's capacity has since been reduced this record cannot be broken.

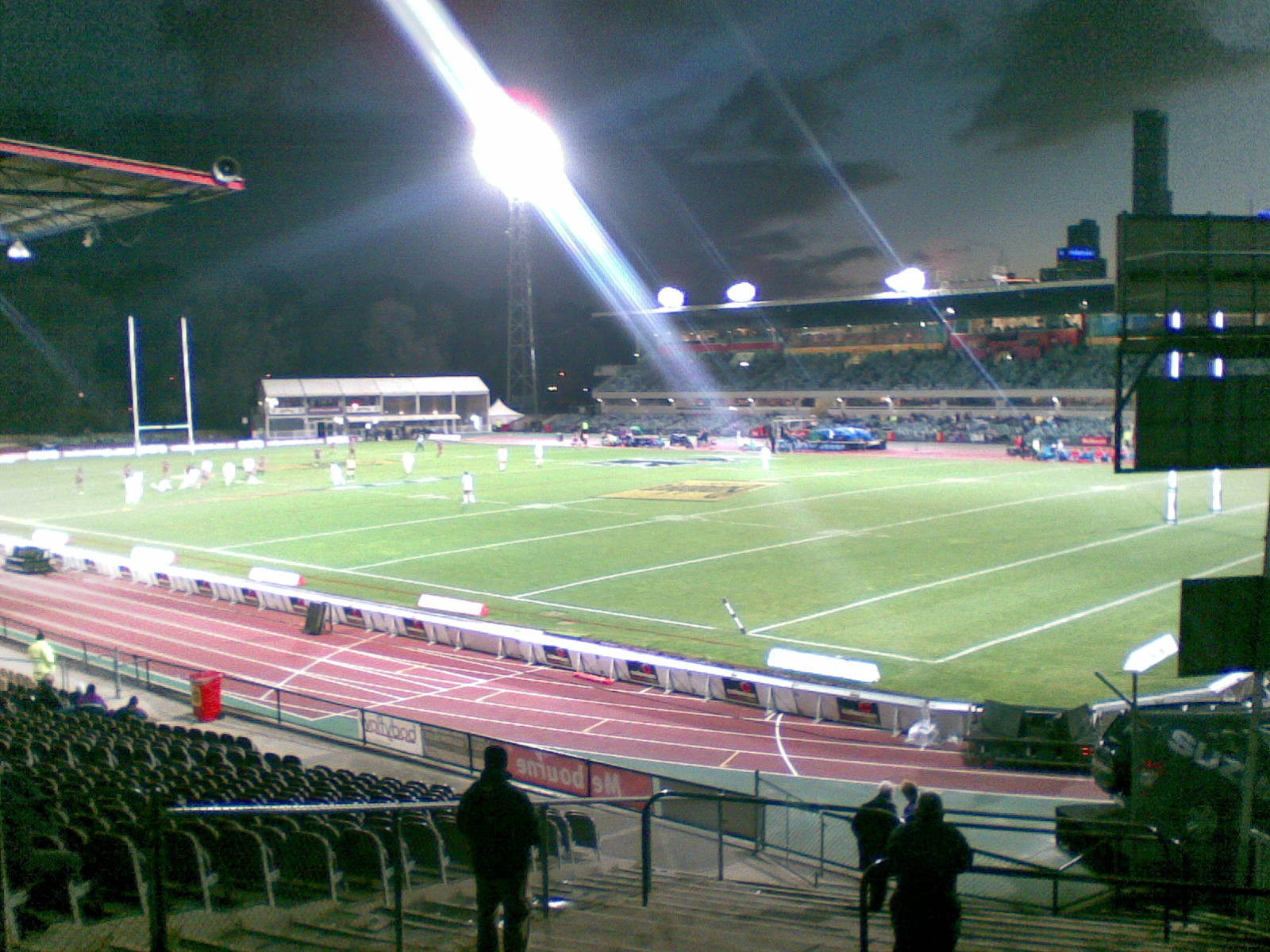
The Storm's former home ground, Olympic Park Stadium during a Toyota cup match

The team remained at Olympic Park until the end of the 2000 season, when it was decided that due to attracting larger home crowds which were now averaging 14,622 spectators, they decided to relocate to the much larger capacity Docklands Stadium for the following season. However, due to Docklands stadium being primarily suited to AFL games and in addition the AFL and stadium management being reluctant to reconfigure the seating for Rugby League games and coupled with the team missing the finals that year, crowd numbers declined and it was decided to move the team back to Olympic Park. Docklands stadium was still used by the Storm for home finals until 2010 and this allowed a home final attendance record of 33,427 to be set in 2007 in the Preliminary Final against Parramatta.

From 2002, crowd numbers declined and by 2004 the Storm had their lowest crowd average of 8,886 per home game; however, at this time the Storm also began a strong recruiting drive and with a new and exciting playing roster, crowds steadily rose over the following years, returning to an average of 14,670 by 2010. The Storm played their final game at Olympic Park in round 25 of the 2009 season, 29 August 2009, with a 36–4 thrashing of the Sydney Roosters The intention was to relocate to its new home venue next door at AAMI Park; however, delays in construction meant that the first game could not be played at the venue until Round 9 of the 2010 season, therefore, the first three home games of 2010 were played at Etihad Stadium. Since then all Storm home games (with the exception of a few homes games played interstate), regular season and finals, have been played at AAMI Park.

Following winning the 2012 premiership and having sustained onfield success, crowd numbers continued to rise. The club's highest regular season attendance at AAMI Park, of 28,716, was set on 25 April 2014 for the ANZAC Day match against New Zealand Warriors. Average crowds have continued to increase and by the end of the 2017 season, another premiership year, had reached a record peak of 18,375. The club's highest official "home" attendance of 52,347 occurred in the 2016 season – this was during a doubleheader game at Suncorp Stadium in Brisbane.

For most of the 2020 and much of the 2021 seasons, the Storm played their home games at Sunshine Coast Stadium on Queensland's Sunshine Coast, due to Victoria's strict COVID-19 policies.

== Statistics and records ==
Melbourne Storm honours
Premierships
| Competition | Level | Wins | Years won |
| National Rugby League | First grade | 4 | 1999, ~~2007~~, ~~2009~~, 2012, 2017, 2020 |
| NRL Under-20s | National U20s | 1 | 2009 |
| New South Wales Rugby League | Jersey Flegg Cup (Under-21s) | 1 | 2025 |
Other titles and honours
| World Club Challenge | Champions | 3 | 2000, ~~2010~~, 2013, 2018 |
| Club Championship | | 1 | 2011 |
Finishing positions
| National Rugby League | Minor premiership J.J. Giltinan Shield | 6 | ~~2006~~, ~~2007~~, ~~2008~~, 2011, 2016, 2017, 2019, 2021, 2024 |
| National Rugby League | Grand Finalist | 7 | 2006, 2007, 2008, 2016, 2018, 2024, 2025 |
| National Rugby League | Wooden spoon | 1 | 2010 |
| New South Wales Rugby League (Jersey Flegg Cup) | Minor premiership | 1 | 2025 |
| New South Wales Rugby League (S.G. Ball Cup) | Grand Finalist | 1 | 2009 |
| New South Wales Rugby League (S.G. Ball Cup) | Wooden spoon | 1 | 2023 |
| New South Wales Rugby League (Harold Matthews Cup) | Wooden spoon | 1 | 2025 |

As of the end of the 2026 NRL season, the Storm has won four NRL Premierships (1999, 2012, 2017 and 2020) and six minor premierships (2011, 2016, 2017, 2019, 2021, 2024). A further two NRL premierships (2007 and 2009) and three minor premierships (2006, 2007, 2008) were withheld due to salary cap breaches. The club's overall win percentage of around 67% is among the best in the league. The most capped player is Cameron Smith with 430 NRL appearances in his career. Smith's total is also the current league record and he also the only NRL player in history to reach the 400 game mark. In addition, Smith is also the league's highest point scorer with 2786 career points. Fullback Billy Slater is the club's most prolific try scorer with 190 tries scored during his career. Melbourne Storm players have also won the Dally M medal on six occasions with Smith winning in 2006 and 2017, Slater in 2011, Cooper Cronk in 2013 and 2016 and most recently Jahrome Hughes in 2024. The Storm have thus far had six Golden Boot award winners, more than any other club (Smith 2007 and 2017, Slater 2008, Greg Inglis 2009, Cronk in 2016 and most recently, Harry Grant in 2025).

Melbourne Storm's winning streak record for the most consecutive matches won stands at 19 matches, between round 4 and round 23 of the 2021 NRL season. This is equal to the league record set in 1975 by Eastern Suburbs. The club's all-time highest score is 70 points which they have scored on two occasions, on 3 March 2000 against St. George Illawarra and on 25 April 2022 vs New Zealand Warriors. Their highest winning margin is 64 points which they've achieved three times, first in a 64–0 win over West Tigers in 2001, then a 68–4 win over Canberra Raiders in 2013, and then a 64–0 win over West Tigers again in 2025.

== Players ==
=== Current squad ===
Melbourne Storm 2026 squad
| Top 30 squad - 2026 NRL season | | | Supplementary list | Coaching staff |
|---|---|---|---|---|
| Shawn Blore – SR; Joe Chan – SR; Cooper Clarke – SR; Xavier Coates – WG; Sua Fa'alogo – FB; Harry Grant (c) – HK; Jack Hetherington – PR; Jack Howarth – CE; Jahrome Hughes (vc) – HB; Eliesa Katoa – SR | Oryn Keeley – SR; Josh King – PR; Moses Leo – WG, CE; Ativalu Lisati – SR; Trent Loiero – LK; Alec MacDonald – LK; Nick Meaney – CE, WG; Davvy Moale – PR; Cameron Munster (vc) – FE; Josiah Pahulu – PR | Gabriel Satrick – HK; Marion Seve – CE; Trent Toelau – HK, HB; Siulagi Tuimalatu-Brown – WG; Stefano Utoikamanu – PR; Manaia Waitere – CE; Will Warbrick – WG; Tyran Wishart – FE, HB | Jai Bowden – HK; Preston Conn – SR; Stanley Huen – FE; Extended squad: Lockyer-Azile Foliola – HK; Jak Goulding – PR; Angus Hinchey – LK; Mitchell Jennings – CE; Amare Milford – SR; Jerry Musu – PR; Hugo Peel – WG; Suli Pole – PR; Keagan Russell-Smith – FE; Hayden Watson – HB | Manager: Frank Ponissi (General Manager of Football); Head coach: Craig Bellamy; Assistant coaches: Marc Brentnall; Aaron Bellamy; Ryan Hinchcliffe; Todd Lowrie (Development Coach); Matt Duffie (Pathways Coach); John Donehue (Contact Coach); Billy Slater (Specialist Coach); Medical professionals: Dr. Jason Chan (Chief Medical Officer); Liam Robinson (Head Physiotherapist); Managers: Paul Bunn (General Manager - Recruitment & List Management); Tim Glasby (Pathways Manager); Lachlan Penfold (Performance); Legend: (c) Captain(s); (vc) Vice-captain(s); Updated: 22 November 2026; Source(s): Storm Team Profiles; Storm staff |

=== Inaugural team ===
The first Melbourne Storm team to take to the field in Round 1 of the 1998 NRL season

Melbourne Storm
| Inaugural Team | Interchange | Coach |
|---|---|---|
| 1 Robbie Ross – FB; 2 Craig Smith – WG; 3 Aaron Moule – CE; 4 Paul Bell – CE; 5 Marcus Bai – WG; 6 Scott Hill – FE; 7 Brett Kimmorley – HB; 8 Rodney Howe – PR; 9 Danny Williams – HK; 10 Robbie Kearns – PR; 11 Paul Marquet – SR; 12 Ben Roarty – SR; 13 Tawera Nikau – LK | 14 Glenn Lazarus (c); 15 Richard Swain; 16 Russell Bawden; 17 John Carlaw | Head coach: Chris Anderson; Legend: (c) Captain(s); (vc) Vice-captain(s); Updated: 23 July 2020; Source(s): NRL 1998 Round 1 |

=== Team of the decade ===
As part of their 10-year celebrations in 2007, Melbourne Storm released a team of the decade. The 17-man team was selected by former assistant coach Greg Brentnall, foundation Executive Director John Ribot, and then board member Frank Stanton (all 3 were members of the 1982 Kangaroo tour "Invincibles", Brentnall and Ribot as players with Stanton the coach). The trio were joined by The Daily Telegraph (Sydney) journalist Steve Mascord.

Melbourne Storm
| Team of the Decade | Interchange | Coach |
|---|---|---|
| 1 Billy Slater – FB; 2 Matt Geyer – WG; 3 Matt King – CE; 4 Greg Inglis – CE; 5 Marcus Bai – WG; 6 Scott Hill – FE; 7 Brett Kimmorley – HB; 8 Glenn Lazarus (c) – PR; 9 Cameron Smith – HK; 10 Robbie Kearns – PR; 11 Dallas Johnson – SR; 12 Stephen Kearney – SR; 13 Tawera Nikau – LK | 14 Cooper Cronk; 15 Rodney Howe; 16 Ryan Hoffman; 17 David Kidwell | Head coach: Craig Bellamy; Legend: (c) Captain(s); (vc) Vice-captain(s); Updated: 9 August 2014; Source(s): Team of the Decade |

=== Team of the first 20 years ===
As part of their 20-year celebrations in 2018, Melbourne Storm announced their team of the first 20 years at a gala night at Crown Casino on 2 March 2018. The 17-man line-up is made up of the greatest players to have pulled on the purple jersey over the last two decades. The team selection panel included Storm Football Director Frank Ponissi, CEO Dave Donaghy, inaugural Executive Director John Ribot, former assistant coach Greg Brentnall, journalist Roy Masters and current coach Craig Bellamy.

Melbourne Storm
| Team of the first 20 years | Interchange | Coach |
|---|---|---|
| 1 Billy Slater – FB; 2 Marcus Bai – WG; 3 Will Chambers – CE; 4 Matt King – CE; 5 Suliasi Vunivalu – WG; 6 Greg Inglis – FE; 7 Cooper Cronk – HB; 8 Jesse Bromwich – PR; 9 Cameron Smith (c) – HK; 10 Glenn Lazarus – PR; 11 Stephen Kearney – SR; 12 Ryan Hoffman – SR; 13 Dallas Johnson – LK | 14 Matt Geyer; 15 Tawera Nikau; 16 Robbie Kearns; 17 Michael Crocker | Head coach: Craig Bellamy; Legend: (c) Captain(s); (vc) Vice-captain(s); Updated: 6 March 2018; Source(s): Team of the first 20 years |

== Supporters ==
The Storm have built a loyal supporter base through the years, growing from almost 500,000 in 2004 to almost 800,000 in 2009, making them the fourth most popular NRL team. The club's supporter group, the "Graveyard Crew", make a banner for the team to run through before the start of each game. By 2019, a record membership figure was set with the club having 25,208 people signed up as season ticket holders, a record which was broken in 2021 when over 27,000 members were signed up. In July 2022, the Storm registered 37,237 members, which is the highest membership tally ever recorded by an NRL club.

=== Notable supporters ===
- Dylan Alcott – Former Australian Paralympian Tennis Player
- Waleed Aly – TV personality The Project
- Billy Brownless – Former AFL player and TV/Radio personality
- Jim Courier — Retired American tennis player, Four time Tennis Grand Slam champion.
- Charlie Cameron, Australian rules footballer currently playing for the Brisbane Lions
- Sarah De Bono – Australian Musician
- Mitch Duncan – Australian Rules Footballer currently playing for the Geelong Cats
- Malcolm Fraser − 22nd Prime Minister of Australia
- Josh Frydenberg − Australian politician
- Julia Gillard – 27th Prime Minister of Australia
- Bob Geldof – International Musician
- Tom Hafey – Australian Rules player and coach
- Peter Helliar – Australian comedian
- Dave Hughes- Radio personality
- Lydia Lassila – Australian Winter Olympian
- Nicole Livingstone – former Australian Olympic Swimmer
- Molly Meldrum – music critic, journalist, record producer and musical entrepreneur
- Koti Ngawati – Australian Olympic swimmer
- Jana Pittman – dual Australian Summer/Winter Olympiad
- Storm Sanders – Australian tennis player
- James Sherry — TV presenter
- Bill Shorten – Minister for the Australian Labor Party
- Peter Siddle – Australian Test cricketer
- Bob Skilton – former Australian Rules Footballer
- Archie Thompson – former Australian Socceroo
- Mark Viduka – former Australian Socceroo
- Max Walker – former Australian cricketer and Australian Rules Footballer
- Shane Watson – Former Australian Test Cricketer
- Jamie Whincup – Australian motor racing driver

== Feeder clubs ==
In 1998, the Storm established an affiliation with Queensland Cup side the Norths Devils and used the club as a feeder for their first grade team. The relationship would prove to be a fruitful one as 13 of the 17 players to compete for the Storm in the 2006 NRL Grand Final had played for the Devils in previous years. In 2005, the Storm also established an affiliation with the North Sydney Bears in the New South Wales Cup. Melbourne severed ties with both the Bears (end of 2006) and the Devils (end of 2007) and aligned themselves with the Central Coast Storm in the New South Wales Cup. The affiliation lasted two seasons before the Storm decided to establish their own team in the NSW Cup in 2010 which would share its namesake. An unsuccessful venture saw the Storm revert to the Queensland Cup in 2011 when it established a feeder relationship with the Easts Tigers (now known as Brisbane Tigers). Melbourne established a second feeder relationship with the Sunshine Coast Falcons in 2014, also from the Queensland Cup. The Storm further committed to the area in 2015 when it was announced their National Youth Competition U20 side would be based out of the Sunshine Coast from 2016.

Following speculation during the 2025 season, the club announced the end of their feeder club partnerships in August 2025.

=== History ===
- Norths Devils – (Queensland Cup) 1998–2007
- North Sydney Bears – (New South Wales Cup) 2005–2006, 2024–2025
- Central Coast Storm – (New South Wales Cup) 2008–2009
- Melbourne Storm – (New South Wales Cup) 2010
- Cronulla-Sutherland Sharks – (New South Wales Cup) 2011–2014
- Brisbane Tigers – (Queensland Cup) 2011–2025
- Sunshine Coast Falcons – (Queensland Cup) 2015–2025

== See also ==
- National Rugby League – Australasian rugby league football competition
- Victorian Rugby League
- Rugby league in Victoria
