= 2010 World Club Challenge =

Intercontinental rugby league match

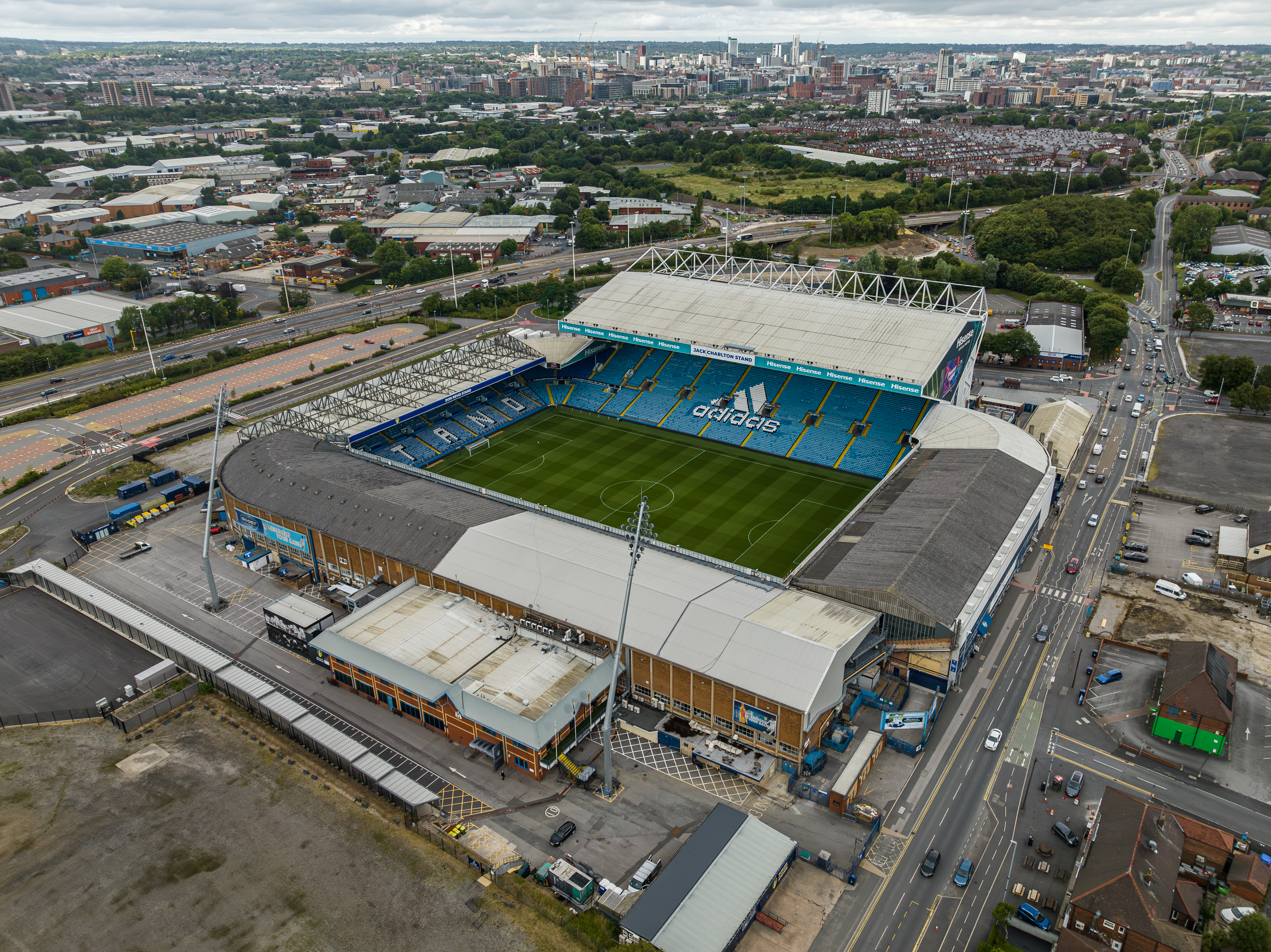
- Elland Road hosted the match
Leeds Rhinos	Melbourne Storm
(Super League)	(National Rugby League)
10	18
	1	2	Total
LEE	4	6	10
MEL	4	14	18
- Date: 28 February 2010
- Stadium: Elland Road
- Location: Leeds, West Yorkshire, England
- Man of the Match: Cameron Smith (but later stripped due to salary cap breach)
- Referee: Richard Silverwood (England)
- Attendance: 27,697

Broadcast partners
- Broadcasters: (United Kingdom) Sky Sports (live (host broadcaster)); (Australia) Fox Sports (live (simulcast of Sky Sports)); (Australia) Nine Network (delayed until 2 March 2010)
- Commentators: Eddie Hemmings; Mike Stephenson; Phil Clarke

The 2010 World Club Challenge (known as the Gillette World Club Challenge for sponsorship reasons) was a rugby league tournament contested by Super League XIV champions, Leeds Rhinos, and 2009 NRL Premiers the Melbourne Storm. This was Leeds' third consecutive appearance in the World Club Challenge, and the second appearance in three years for Melbourne. Melbourne and Leeds previously played each other in the 2008 World Club Challenge with Leeds winning that match 11 - 4.

Melbourne Storm won the game 18-10; however later in the year were stripped of the title (as well as its 2009 NRL premiership and other titles) after the club was found guilty of salary cap breaches. The prize money was redistributed to Leeds, but the title of World Club Champion was not, as the game had been retroactively declared null and void.

== Background ==
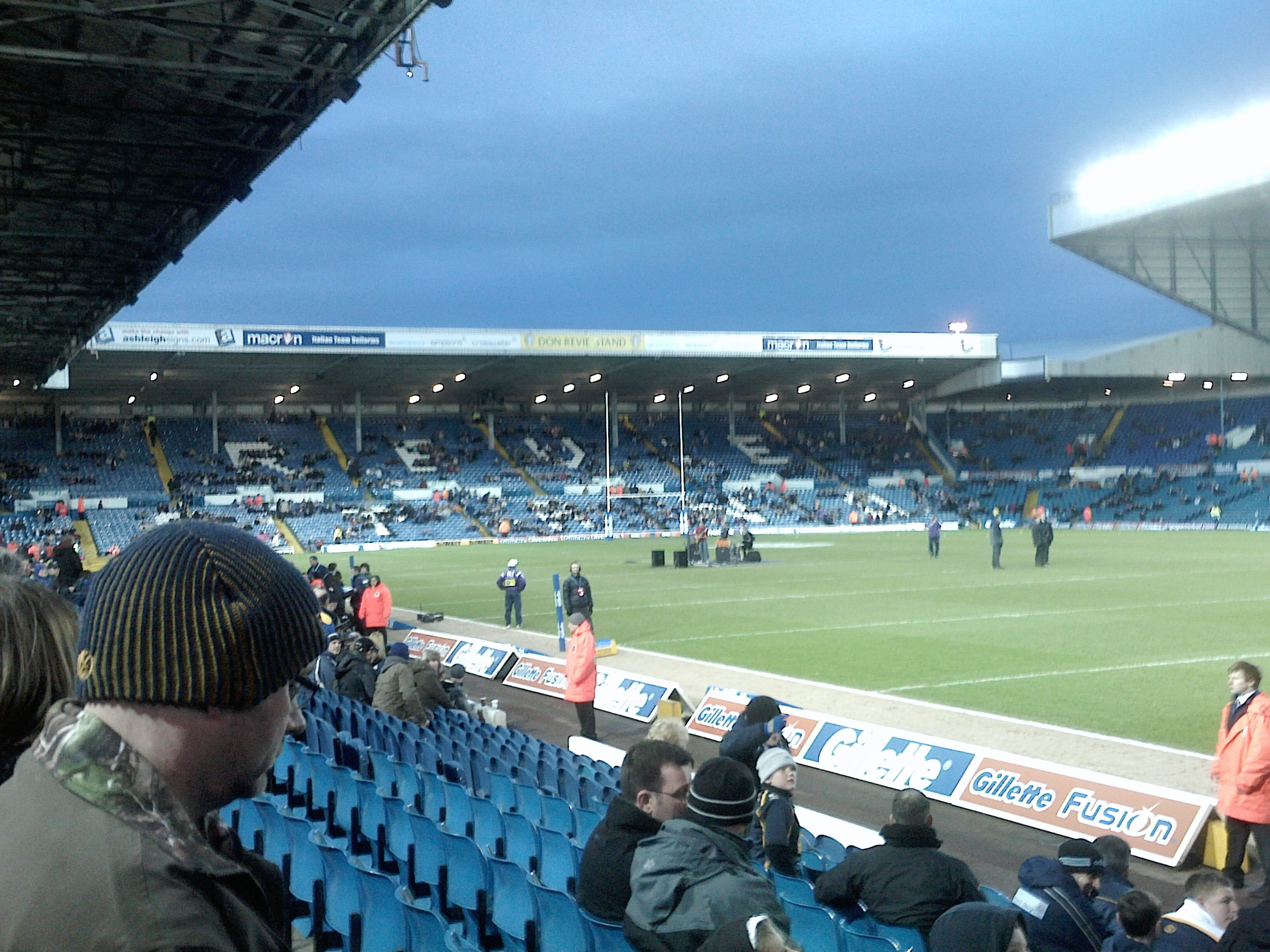
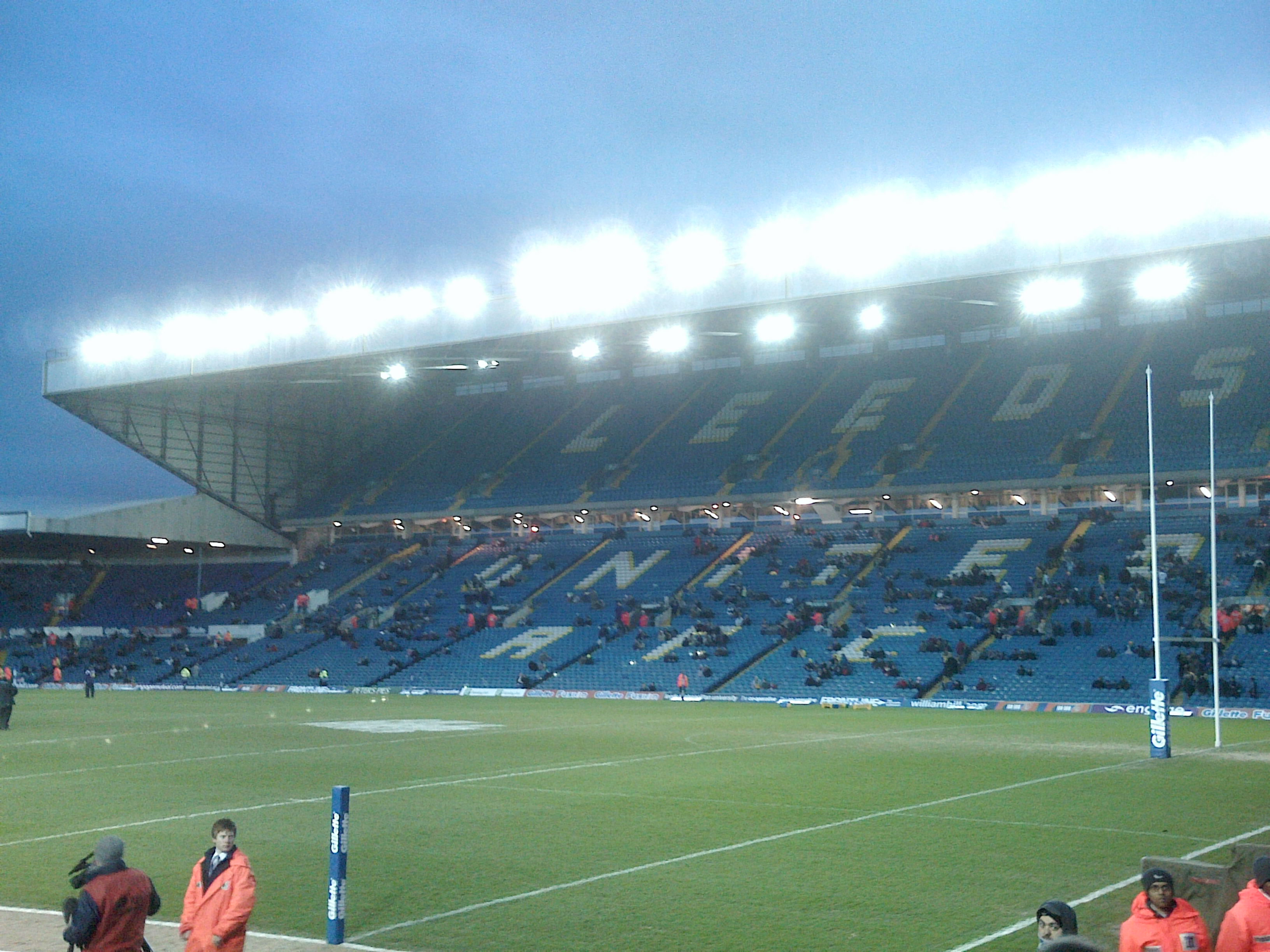
Elland Road prior to the match.

=== Leeds Rhinos ===
Leeds Rhinos qualified through being the 2009 Super League champions, defeating St Helens R.F.C. 18–10 in the Grand Final.

=== Melbourne Storm ===
Melbourne Storm qualified by being crowned the 2009 National Rugby League premiers with a 23–16 defeat of the Parramatta Eels, in the NRL Grand Final. This premiership was later stripped from the Storm due to salary cap breaches.

The Storm, despite being stripped of their two premierships, were initially allowed to keep the World Club Challenge title, including the trophy and prize money they won; however, on 11 May 2011, a final report released further detailing the Melbourne Storm salary cap scandal recommended the Storm be stripped of the 2010 World Club Challenge. In addition the prize money won was redistributed to Leeds, but the game itself was declared null and void.

=== Warm-up match ===
Melbourne played a warm-up game against the Harlequins RL Super League team at the Twickenham Stoop. The match took place on Sunday 21 February - a week before the Storm played for the world title. The event was dubbed the World City Challenge – London Series. Melbourne were without Cooper Cronk, Brett White and Ryan Tandy, with both sides giving a number of youngsters a taste of first-team action.

21 February 2010
14:00 GMT

Harlequins RL	10–34	Melbourne Storm
Tries: Ben Jones-Bishop, Will Sharp; Goals: Danny Orr	(Report)	Tries: Anthony Quinn, Kevin Proctor, Dane Nielsen (2), Hep Cahill, Rory Kostjaysn; Goals: Gareth Widdop (5)

The Stoop
Attendance: 3,612

== Teams ==
Melbourne were missing seven players from their 2009 premiership squad, including regular halfback Cooper Cronk who missed the match through injury, with captain Cameron Smith playing out of position.

Leeds were almost at full strength, missing only Australian winger Scott Donald.

Team details
Leeds Rhinos		Position	Melbourne Storm
Name	Number	Position	Number	Name
Brent Webb	1	FB	1	Billy Slater
Kallum Watkins	23	WG	2	Luke MacDougall
Brett Delaney	3	CE	3	Dane Nielsen
Keith Senior	4	CE	4	Greg Inglis
Ryan Hall	5	WG	5	Anthony Quinn
Danny McGuire	6	SO/FE	6	Brett Finch
Rob Burrow	7	SH/HB	7	Cameron Smith (c)
Kylie Leuluai	8	PR	8	Aiden Tolman
Matt Diskin	14	HK	9	Ryan Hinchcliffe
Jamie Peacock	10	PF	10	Jeff Lima
Jamie Jones-Buchanan	11	SR	11	Adam Blair
Ian Kirke	17	SR	12	Ryan Hoffman
Kevin Sinfield (c)	13	LF/LK	13	Todd Lowrie
Danny Buderus	9	IN	14	Rory Kostjaysn
Ali Lauitiiti	12	IN	15	Kevin Proctor
Greg Eastwood	15	IN	16	Hep Cahill
Ryan Bailey	16	IN	17	Jesse Bromwich
(New Zealand) Brian McClennan		Coach		(Australia) Craig Bellamy

== Match details ==
2010 World Club Challenge

28 February 2010
18:30 GMT (UTC+0)

Leeds Rhinos	10 – 18	Melbourne Storm
Tries: 1 McGuire 48'; Goals: 3/3; Sinfield pen 4' (1/1); Burrow pen 33', 49' (2/2)	1st: 4 – 4; 2nd: 6 – 14; Report	Tries: 2 MacDougall 51'; Quinn 78'; Goals: 5/5; Smith pen 7', pen 38', 52', pen 60', 79'

Elland Road, Leeds
Attendance: 27,697
Referee: Richard Silverwood (England)
Player of the Match: Cameron Smith
(Note: Later stripped due to Melbourne Storm's breach of the NRL's salary cap)

=== First half ===
In slippery and rainy conditions, Leeds almost scored in the first few minutes when Brent Webb ran over, but was held up by Luke MacDougall on the last tackle. Soon after they posted the first points with a penalty goal to captain Kevin Sinfield. Soon after Melbourne drew level with a penalty goal of their own through captain Cameron Smith. In the 13th minute, Kallum Watkins almost scored in the corner, but the ball slipped from his grasp before he could ground the ball. Melbourne then went close to scoring through Ryan Hinchcliffe in the 26th minute, but he was bundled into touch by the Leeds defence.

After Sinfield left the field in the 30th minute with a leg injury, Rob Burrow kicked another penalty goal, leaving Leeds two points in front. Smith then levelled the score again with the fourth consecutive penalty goal. The half ended with the scored tied 4–all, after Hinchcliffe was denied a try in the 40th minute when a knock-on was spotted in the lead-up by the video referee.

=== Second half ===
Eight minutes into the second half, Smith attempted a grubber kick which landed in the path of Danny McGuire, who ran down the length of the field to score the first try. The try was awarded by video referee Phil Bentham despite Melbourne's protests that McGuire was offside. Burrow's conversion pushed the margin out to six. Melbourne responded quickly after through a try to MacDougall who scored in the right corner. Despite the tough angle, Smith made the conversion.

Melbourne would gain the lead for the first time after 60 minutes, with Smith scoring another penalty goal to go up 12–10. The penalty was awarded against Keith Senior for dissent as Leeds' frustration over Melbourne's defensive tactics mounted. Watkins again went close to scoring a try in the 74th minute, but he knocked-on reaching out to score. A late Anthony Quinn try sealed the game, with Storm winning 18–10.

=== Player of the Match ===
The Player of the Match was awarded to Cameron Smith from the Melbourne Storm, but he was later stripped of the award because of the Storm's salary cap breach.
