= 2011 Melbourne Storm season =

- NRL Rank: 1st (Minor Premier)
- Play-off result: Preliminary Final Loss
- 2011 record: Wins: 19; draws: 0; losses: 5
- Points scored: For: 521; against: 308

Team information
- CEO: Ron Gauci
- Coach: Craig Bellamy
- Captain: Cameron Smith (24 games) Cooper Cronk (1 game) Adam Blair (1 game)
- Stadium: AAMI Park – 30,050
- Avg. attendance: 14,246
- High attendance: 24,081 (Round 24) (Note: Regular season home games only)

Top scorers
- Tries: Billy Slater (12); Cooper Cronk (12); Matt Duffie (12)
- Goals: Cameron Smith (78)
- Points: Cameron Smith (164)
← 2010	List of seasons	2012 →

The 2011 Melbourne Storm season was the 14th in the club's history. They competed in the 2011 NRL season and finished the regular season in first place, winning the J.J. Giltinan Shield for taking out the minor premiership.

Melbourne would play nine of their first 13 games at AAMI Park, and enjoyed a strong start to the season with a 7–3 record from the opening 10 rounds. Their run of stellar form continued, losing just two games for the remainder of the season. Both of those came on the eve of the finals but the team was still able to win the minor premiership, finishing two points clear of Manly. After beating Newcastle 18–8 in the Qualifying final, Storm's season was prematurely ended with a home preliminary final loss to the Warriors. Melbourne again finished the season with the competition's best defence. At the Dally M awards, the club featured prominently. Gareth Widdop also enjoyed a breakout season, playing 25 games while making 16 line breaks and providing 16 try assists.

== Season summary ==
- 4 February – Chief Executive Officer Ron Gauci announces that Crown Melbourne will be the club's new major sponsor. With the club's management also able to secure long-term commitments from a number of other sponsors.
- 13 February – Club owners News Limited announce that they will officially exit the game on 30 April 2011, as part of the competition's move to an independent commission to control rugby league in Australia. News vows to continue to support the Melbourne Storm via the $8m grant provided to the club.
- 18 February – Four prominent player managers are named in investigation reports into the club's 2010 salary cap breaches, as the fallout continued.
- Pre-season – In a trial match against Queensland Cup teams Easts Tigers and Ipswich Jets, Melbourne open their 2011 season with a win and a loss. Melbourne faced Ipswich in two 20-minute halves, winning 34–0, then faced another two 20-minute halves against affiliate team Easts, losing 10–0.
- Round 1 – Melbourne earn their first competition points, defeating bitter rivals the Manly-Warringah Sea Eagles 18–6 at AAMI Park, with Jaiman Lowe and Troy Thompson making their club debuts. Winger Chase Stanley was injured in the match, suffering a knee injury that would keep him out for the season.
- 16 March – The NRL call in police to investigate a betting plunge that reportedly earned punters $200,000 by using inside information before Melbourne's salary cap breach news broke in April 2010.
- Round 2 – Billy Slater equals Matt Geyer's club record of 113 tries in a 40–12 win over the Gold Coast Titans. Slater scored two tries with Melbourne jumping out to a 28–0 lead at half time.
- Round 3 – At a wet and windy Dairy Farmers Stadium the North Queensland Cowboys defeat Melbourne 34–6, with the loss exacerbated by a broken ankle suffered by Sika Manu.
- 10 April – Billy Slater re-signs with the Storm for a further four seasons, with the new contract keeping him with Melbourne until the end of the 2015 season.
- Round 4 – Two tries to winger Matt Duffie, including one in the opening minute saw Melbourne back on the winner's list with in a 30–16 victory over the Canterbury-Bankstown Bulldogs.
- Round 5 – Melbourne thrash the Parramatta Eels 38–0, with Beau Champion scoring two tries. The victory making for an uncomfortable return for former Storm player and assistant coach Stephen Kearney, who departed the Storm at the end of 2010, to take on the Eels head coach position. It was Melbourne's first win over Parramatta since the 2009 NRL Grand Final.
- Round 6 – The club win their first game away from home after seven successive defeats outside of Melbourne, a streak stretching back almost a year.
- Round 7 – In front of a crowd over 22,000, the New Zealand Warriors win the annual ANZAC Day match 18–14 to retain the Michael Moore Trophy.
- 6 May – Victoria Police confirm that no criminal charges will be laid over the club's salary cap breach.

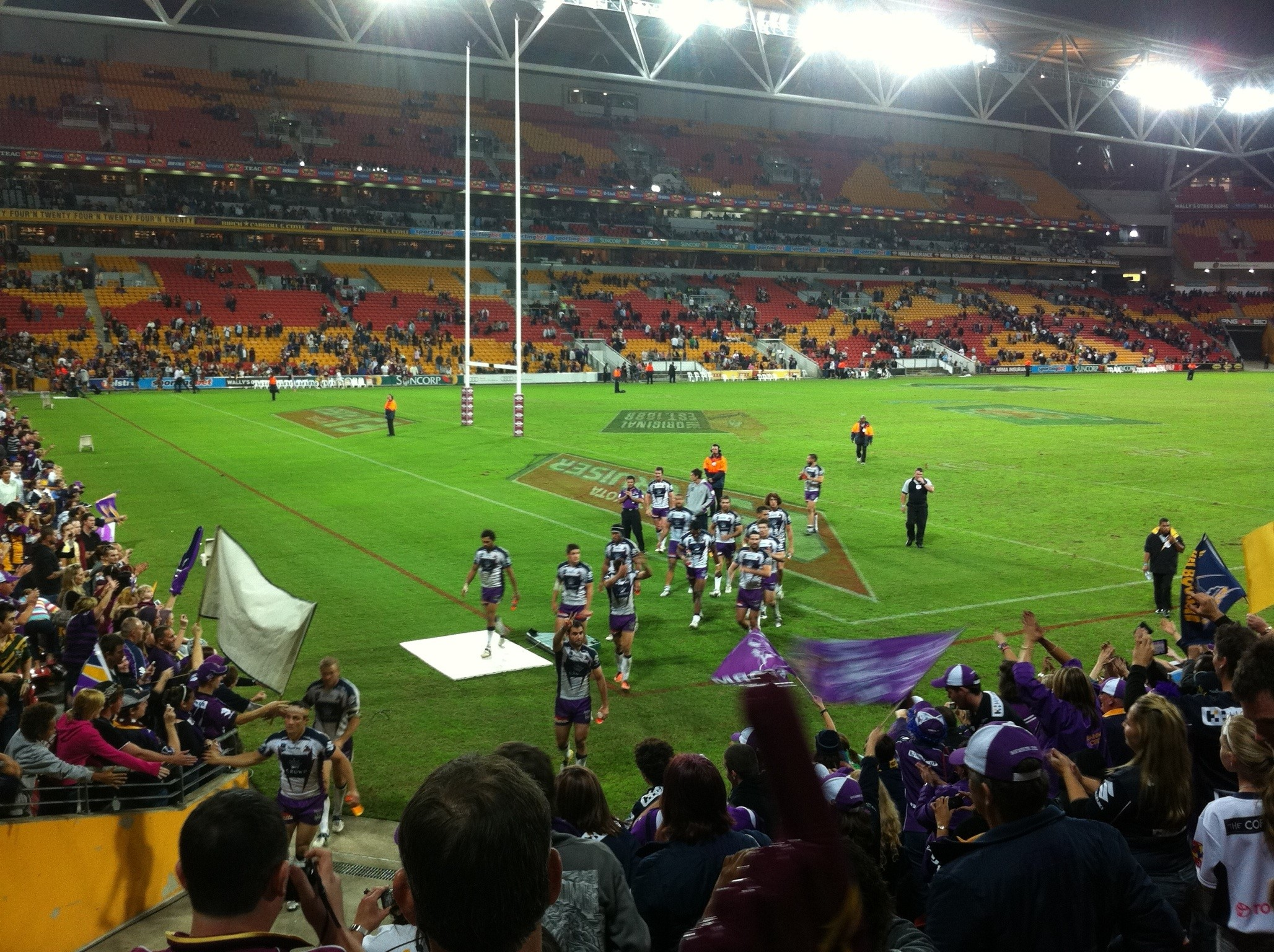
Melbourne Storm players saluting the travelling fans following their win over the Brisbane Broncos at Suncorp Stadium

- Round 9 – With four Melbourne players backing up from playing in a test match the night before, the Storm leave it late to defeat an understrength Brisbane Broncos 29–22 thanks to a Cooper Cronk field goal and a final try to Anthony Quinn. Brisbane had levelled the scoreboard at 22–all after trailing at half time.
- 11 May – NRL salary cap auditor Ian Schubert releases a report into the salary cap scandal, recommending lifetime bans to former club officials Brian Waldron, Matt Hanson and two other officials. Schubert's report exposing a "toxic culture of deceit."
- Round 10 – Canberra Raiders defeat Melbourne in Victoria for the first time since the 2000 season, with the visitors snapping their losing streak in a 20–12 upset.
- Round 12 – Celebrating captain Cameron Smith's 200th NRL match, Melbourne defeat the Cronulla-Sutherland Sharks 14–8 after a scoreless first half. Smith had suffered a head knock late in the first half and looked dazed leaving the field, but returned in the second half to spark the win.
- Round 14 – Missing players due to State of Origin selection, Melbourne led by stand-in captain Adam Blair defeat the Sydney Roosters 21–4 with coach Craig Bellamy quoted as saying "it was a real complete team performance and...it was one of the best team efforts since I've been here."
- Round 15 – Melbourne return to the top of the NRL ladder for the first time since the 2010 salary cap scandal, defeating the Wests Tigers 12–4 after a scoreless second half.
- Round 16 – Melbourne regain the Michael Moore Trophy from the Warriors, claiming their fifth straight win 16–8 at Mt Smart Stadium with Billy Slater scoring two tries.
- Round 19 – Avenging their defeat in round 10, Melbourne hold the Canberra Raiders scoreless for the first time in their history at their own home ground Canberra Stadium.
- Round 20 – After six weeks away from AAMI Park, Melbourne return to Victoria in a heavily promoted match against the Broncos. Almost 23,000 spectators attended the match, seeing the Storm victorious 26–6. Cameron Smith notched up his 500th goal during the match.
- Round 21 – Trailing 18–0 in the 54th minute, Melbourne surge past the Parramatta Eels away at Parramatta Stadium for a remarkable 22–18 victory.
- Round 23 – Justin O'Neill suffers a season-ending back injury in the club's 11th straight win, this time accounting for the Gold Coast Titans 40–16, with Cooper Cronk scoring a hat-trick of tries at a rainy AAMI Park.
- Round 24 – In Billy Slater's 200th NRL match, Melbourne records their 12th consecutive victory, eclipsing the previous club record set in 2006. The 8–6 win over the St George Illawarra Dragons, saw the highest home crowd of the season and their 4th highest home crowd of all time, with 24,081 in attendance.
- Round 25 – In a violent match known as the "Battle of Brookvale," Melbourne lose 18–4 to the Manly-Warringah Sea Eagles at Brookvale Oval. Adam Blair was first sin binned, and then sent off for his part in a wild on-field brawl, later receiving a five-match suspension, meaning he had played his last game for the club. Other players would also receive suspensions, with the club fined $50,000 by the NRL, with NRL chief David Gallop saying "this kind of ugly brawling is simply not on."
- Round 26 – With the minor premiership secured before taking the field, Craig Bellamy opts to rest Billy Slater and Cameron Smith for the match against the Sydney Roosters. Melbourne lose the match 40–8 and also suffer injuries to Gareth Widdop, Maurice Blair and Jaiman Lowe.
- 6 September – Billy Slater was crowned Dally M Player of the Year at the 2011 Dally M Awards. Teammate Cooper Cronk finished third in the count. Craig Bellamy also won coach of the year and Cameron Smith won the Representative player of the year award.
- Qualifying final – Melbourne jump out to a 16–0 lead in the first half of their final against the eighth-placed Newcastle Knights, eventually winning 18–8 to earn a home preliminary final and a week off. After the match NRL chief David Gallop presents Melbourne with the J. J. Giltinan Shield, with Gallop receiving a torrent of boos from the Storm fans over his role in the punishments handed out to the club.
- 13 September – David Gallop is forced to apologise after using an analogy to compare Storm fans to terrorists. Gallop saying in a radio interview "I never really go for that whole passion line. I mean terrorists are passionate about what they do and, you know, that doesn't make it right."
- Preliminary final – Melbourne's season comes to a sudden end, upset 20–12 by the New Zealand Warriors at AAMI Park. Opposition halfback Shaun Johnston playing a starring role for the visitors, who led 14–12 at half time and withstood Melbourne's pressure in the second half. Craig Bellamy saying "I don't care what else comes out of tonight, we are disappointed, we're bitterly disappointed, but at the same time this club has come a long wat to where we were this time last year."

=== Milestone games ===
Round	Player	Milestone
Round 1	Jaiman Lowe	Storm debut
Round 1	Troy Thompson	Storm debut
Round 2	Adam Blair	100th game
Round 2	Beau Champion	Storm debut
Round 4	Atelea Vea	Storm debut
Round 4	Adam Woolnough	Storm debut
Round 9	Maurice Blair	Storm debut
Round 9	Sisa Waqa	Storm debut
Round 10	Dane Chisholm	NRL debut
Round 12	Cameron Smith	200th game
Round 24	Billy Slater	200th game
Round 26	Jack Afamasaga	Storm debut

=== Jerseys ===
In 2011 the Storm jerseys were made by Kooga. They retained their predominantly purple home jersey from 2010 and also their predominantly white away jersey from 2010.

On 4 February 2011 Crown Casino was named the major sponsor of the Storm in 2011 with their corporate logo added to the front of the jersey. Suzuki Australia continued as major sponsors as well, with their logo appearing on the sleeves. There was no sponsorship on the rear of the jersey. Makita also announced a continuation of their sponsorship and their logo on the players shorts.

Heritage

In round 5 for the NRL's heritage round, Melbourne wore a replica of their original 1998 home jersey.

Special

In the round 20 home game against the Brisbane Broncos, Storm wore a special "platinum battle" jersey. The jersey was mostly navy blue with a large grey and white chevron on the front, also featured the word "Melbourne" printed across the upper back. This jersey was to symbolise the links to the state of Victoria and Melbourne, following the City of Melbourne's sponsorship of the match.

=== Attendance averages ===
	Total	Matches	Average
Home	170,952	12	14,246
Away	173,173	12	14,431
All regular season games	344,125	24	14,339
Finals	43,425	2	21,712
All Games	387,550	26	14,906

== Fixtures ==
=== Preseason ===
Date	Rd	Opponent	Venue	Result	Mel.	Opp.	Tries	Goals	Field goals	Ref
11 February	Trial (Note: Split squad match played in 20 minute halves)	Ipswich Jets	Langlands Park, Brisbane	Won	34	0	S Thorpe (2), A Vea, E Niko, M Johnson, S Griffen	G Widdop (3), D Chisholm (2)		
11 February	Trial (Note: Split squad match played in 20 minute halves)	Easts Tigers	Langlands Park, Brisbane	Lost	0	10				
19 February	Trial	Canberra Raiders	Bega Recreation Ground, Bega	Won	24	4	C Stanley (2), A Vea, T Maori	G Widdop 2/2, D Chisholm 2/2		
26 February	Trial	Brisbane Broncos	Dolphin Oval, Brisbane	Lost	6	26	J O'Neill	C Smith 1/1		

=== Regular season ===
==== Result by round ====
Round	1	2	3	4	5	6	7	8	9	10	11	12	13	14	15	16	17	18	19	20	21	22	23	24	25	26
Ground	H	H	A	H	H	A	H	H	A	H	–	H	A	H	A	A	–	A	A	H	A	H	A	H	A	A
Result	W	W	L	W	W	W	L	W	W	L	B	W	W	W	W	W	B	W	W	W	W	W	W	W	L	L
Position	3	2	7	2	1	1	3	3	2	2	2	2	2	2	1	1	1	1	1	1	1	1	1	1	1	1
Points	2	4	4	6	8	10	10	12	14	14	16	18	20	22	24	26	28	30	32	34	36	38	40	42	42	42

Source: Rugby League Tables
A = Away; H = Home; N = Neutral; B = Bye; W = Win; D = Draw; L = Loss

==== Matches ====
- (g.p.) – Golden Point extra time
- (pen) – Penalty try

Date	Rd	Opponent	Venue	Result	Mel.	Opp.	Tries	Goals	Field goals	Ref
12 March	1	Manly Warringah Sea Eagles	AAMI Park, Melbourne	Won	18	6	C Stanley, M Duffie, D Nielsen	C Smith 2/2		
19 March	2	Gold Coast Titans	AAMI Park, Melbourne	Won	40	12	B Slater (2), A Quinn, S Manu, C Smith, J O'Neill, C Cronk	C Smith 6/7		
28 March	3	North Queensland Cowboys	Dairy Farmers Stadium, Townsville	Lost	6	34	G Widdop	C Smith 1/1		
4 April	4	Canterbury-Bankstown Bulldogs	AAMI Park, Melbourne	Won	30	16	M Duffie (2), K Proctor, D Nielsen, J Bromwich	C Smith 5/6		
10 April	5 (Note: Heritage Round)	Parramatta Eels	AAMI Park, Melbourne	Won	38	0	B Champion (2), C Cronk, B Slater, A Quinn, M Duffie	C Smith 4/6, G Widdop 1/1		
17 April	6	Penrith Panthers	Centrebet Stadium, Sydney	Won	25	10	C Cronk, B Norrie, B Slater, M Duffie	C Smith 4/5	C Cronk 1/1	
25 April	7 (Note: ANZAC Day)	New Zealand Warriors	AAMI Park, Melbourne	Lost	14	18	B Champion, C Cronk	C Smith 3/3		
30 April	8	Newcastle Knights	AAMI Park, Melbourne	Won	42	12	B Champion, M Duffie, T Lowrie, D Nielsen, B Norrie, B Slater, A Quinn	C Smith 7/7		
7 May	9	Brisbane Broncos	Suncorp Stadium, Brisbane	Won	29	22	C Cronk, R Hinchcliffe, D Nielsen, A Quinn, S Waqa	C Smith 4/5	C Cronk 1/2	
14 May	10	Canberra Raiders	AAMI Park, Melbourne	Lost	12	20	M Duffie, K Proctor	C Smith 2/2		
21 May	11	Bye								
29 May	12	Cronulla-Sutherland Sharks	AAMI Park, Melbourne	Won	14	8	D Nielsen, S Waqa	C Smith 3/3		
5 June	13	South Sydney Rabbitohs	ANZ Stadium, Sydney	Won	16	6	M Blair, J Bromwich, C Smith	C Smith 1/2, G Widdop 1/1		
13 June	14	Sydney Roosters	AAMI Park, Melbourne	Won	21	4	J O'Neill (2), B Champion	G Widdop 4/5	G Widdop	
19 June	15	Wests Tigers	Leichhardt Oval, Sydney	Won	12	4	R Hinchcliffe, K Proctor	M Duffie 1/1, C Smith 1/1		
26 June	16	New Zealand Warriors	Mt Smart Stadium, Auckland	Won	16	8	B Slater (2), G Widdop	C Smith 2/3		
2 July	17	Bye								
9 July	18	Canterbury-Bankstown Bulldogs	Adelaide Oval, Adelaide	Won	28	18	C Cronk (2), J Bromwich, M Duffie, S Waqa	C Smith 3/4, G Widdop 1/1		
17 July	19	Canberra Raiders	Canberra Stadium, Canberra	Won	26	0	M Duffie (2), J Bromwich, C Cronk, R Hinchcliffe	C Smith 3/4, G Widdop 0/1		
22 July	20	Brisbane Broncos	AAMI Park, Melbourne	Won	26	6	M Blair (2), C Cronk, J O'Neill	C Smith 5/5		
1 August	21	Parramatta Eels	Parramatta Stadium, Sydney	Won	22	18	D Nielsen, J O'Neill, B Slater, S Waqa	C Smith 3/4		
6 August	22	Penrith Panthers	AAMI Park, Melbourne	Won	26	6	R Hinchcliffe, S Manu, K Proctor, B Slater	C Smith 5/5		
13 August	23	Gold Coast Titans	Skilled Park, Gold Coast	Won	40	16	C Cronk (3), B Slater (2), S Manu, A Quinn	C Smith 6/7		
19 August	24	St. George Illawarra Dragons	AAMI Park, Melbourne	Won	8	6	A Quinn	C Smith 2/2		
26 August	25	Manly-Warringah Sea Eagles	Brookvale Oval, Sydney	Lost	4	18	B Slater	G Widdop 0/1		
4 September	26	Sydney Roosters	Sydney Football Stadium, Sydney	Lost	8	40	B Champion, M Duffie	C Cronk 0/1, G Widdop 0/1		

Fixture notes:

=== Finals ===
Qualifying final

Sunday, 11 September
16:00 AEST (UTC+10)

Melbourne Storm	18 – 8	Newcastle Knights
Tries: 3 Duffie 14'; Champion 28'; Manu 36'; Goals: 3 C Smith 15', 37', pen 51' (3/4)	1st: 16–0; 2nd: 2–8	Tries: 2 Gidley 64'; Uate 67'; Goals: 0 Gidley (0/2)

AAMI Park, Melbourne
Attendance: 14,845
Referees: Ashley Klein, Adam Devcich

Preliminary final

Saturday, 24 September
19:45 AEST (UTC+10)

Melbourne Storm	12 – 20	New Zealand Warriors
Tries: 2 Manu 5'; Champion 35'; Goals: 2 C Smith 6', 36' (2/2)	1st: 12–14; 2nd: 0–6	Tries: 3 Tupou 12'; Maloney 16'; Brown 77'; Goals: 4 Maloney 13', 17', pen 39', 78' (4/4)

AAMI Park, Melbourne
Attendance: 28,580
Referees: Matt Cecchin, Tony Archer

== Ladder ==
2011 NRL Telstra Premiership
Pos.	Team	Pld	W	D	L	B	PF	PA	PD	Pts
1	Melbourne Storm	24	19	0	5	2	521	308	213	42
2	Manly Warringah Sea Eagles (P)	24	18	0	6	2	539	331	208	40
3	Brisbane Broncos	24	18	0	6	2	511	372	139	40
4	Wests Tigers	24	15	0	9	2	519	430	89	34
5	St. George Illawarra Dragons	24	14	1	9	2	483	341	142	33
6	New Zealand Warriors	24	14	0	10	2	504	393	111	32
7	North Queensland Cowboys	24	14	0	10	2	532	480	52	32
8	Newcastle Knights	24	12	0	12	2	478	443	35	28
9	Canterbury-Bankstown Bulldogs	24	12	0	12	2	449	489	-40	28
10	South Sydney Rabbitohs	24	11	0	13	2	531	562	-31	26
11	Sydney Roosters	24	10	0	14	2	417	500	-83	24
12	Penrith Panthers	24	9	0	15	2	430	517	-87	22
13	Cronulla-Sutherland Sharks	24	7	0	17	2	428	557	-129	18
14	Parramatta Eels	24	6	1	17	2	385	538	-153	17
15	Canberra Raiders	24	6	0	18	2	423	623	-200	16
16	Gold Coast Titans	24	6	0	18	2	363	629	-266	16

== 2011 Coaching Staff ==
=== NRL ===
- Head coach: Craig Bellamy
- Assistant coaches: David Kidwell & Kevin Walters
- Development coach: Tony Adam
- Specialist coach: Robbie Kearns
- Strength and conditioning Coach: Alex Corvo
- Assistant Strength and Conditioning Coaches: Adrian Jiminez & Dan Di Pasqua
- Head physiotherapist: Kieran Morgan
- Assistant physiotherapist: Andrew Nawrocki
- Head Trainer: Craig Sultana
- General Manager Football Operations: Frank Ponissi
- Recruitment manager: Darren Bell

=== NRL Under 20s ===
- Head coach: Dean Pay
- Assistant coach: Adam O'Brien
- Development coach: Chad Buckby
- High Performance Manager: Chris Jones
- Physiotherapist: Aaron Howlett

== 2011 squad ==
Cap	Nat.	Player name	Position	First Storm game	Previous First Grade RL club (Note: Previous First Grade RL club: This column denotes the previous RL club the player was signed to and played first grade RL for. If they are yet to debut then this is stipulated. If they were merely signed to the club but did not play then it is not counted)
55	(Australia)	Cameron Smith (c)	HK	2002	(Australia) Melbourne Storm
58	(Australia)	Billy Slater	FB	2003	(Australia) Melbourne Storm
73	(Australia)	Cooper Cronk	HB	2004	(Australia) Melbourne Storm
86	(New Zealand)	Adam Blair	PR	2006	(Australia) Melbourne Storm
91	(Australia)	Anthony Quinn	WG	2007	(Australia) Newcastle Knights
98	(New Zealand)	Sika Manu	SR	2007	(Australia) Melbourne Storm
104	(Australia)	Dane Nielsen	CE	2008	(Australia) Cronulla Sharks
105	(New Zealand)	Kevin Proctor	SR	2008	(Australia) Melbourne Storm
110	(Australia)	Ryan Hinchcliffe	HK, LK	2009	(Australia) Canberra Raiders
116	(Australia)	Luke Kelly	FE, HB	2009	(Australia) Melbourne Storm
119	(New Zealand)	Jesse Bromwich	PR	2010	(Australia) Melbourne Storm
120	(Republic of Ireland)	Rory Kostjasyn	HK, LK	2010	(Australia) Melbourne Storm
121	(Australia)	Todd Lowrie	SR, LK	2010	(Australia) Newcastle Knights
122	(Australia)	Luke MacDougall	WG	2010	(Australia) Newcastle Knights
123	(Australia)	Bryan Norrie	PR	2010	(Australia) Cronulla Sharks
124	(New Zealand)	Matt Duffie	WG	2010	(Australia) Melbourne Storm
125	(England)	Gareth Widdop	FE, FB	2010	(Australia) Melbourne Storm
126	(New Zealand)	Chase Stanley	CE	2010	(Australia) St George Illawarra Dragons
127	(Vanuatu)	Justin O'Neill	CE	2010	(Australia) Melbourne Storm
128	(Australia)	Robbie Rochow	SR	2010	(Australia) Melbourne Storm
129	(Tonga)	Sione Kite	PR	2010	(Australia) Canterbury Bulldogs
130	(Australia)	Jaiman Lowe	PR	2011	(Australia) South Sydney Rabbitohs
131	(Australia)	Troy Thompson	PR	2011	(Australia) Canberra Raiders
132	(Australia)	Beau Champion	CE	2011	(Australia) South Sydney Rabbitohs
133	(Tonga)	Atelea Vea	CE	2011	(Australia) Cronulla Sharks
134	(Australia)	Maurice Blair	CE, FE	2011	(Australia) Penrith Panthers
135	(Australia)	Adam Woolnough	PR	2011	(Australia) Penrith Panthers
136	(Fiji)	Sisa Waqa	WG	2011	(Australia) Sydney Roosters
137	(France)	Dane Chisholm	FE	2011	(Australia) Melbourne Storm
138	(Samoa)	Jack Afamasaga	SR	2011	(Australia) Cronulla Sharks
-	(New Zealand)	Elijah Niko	SR	Yet to Debut	(Australia) Melbourne Storm
-	(New Zealand)	Slade Griffen	HK	Yet to Debut	(Australia) Melbourne Storm
-	(Australia)	Jake Hawkins	FE	Yet to Debut	(Australia) Melbourne Storm
-	(Samoa)	Kirisome Auva'a	CE	Yet to Debut	(Australia) Melbourne Storm
-	(Australia)	Jordan McLean	PR	Yet to Debut	(Australia) Melbourne Storm
-	(Australia)	Mitchel Johnson	PR	Yet to Debut	(Australia) Melbourne Storm

== Player movements ==
Losses

- Hep Cahill to Crusaders
- Brett Finch to Wigan Warriors
- Ryan Hoffman to Wigan Warriors
- Greg Inglis to South Sydney Rabbitohs
- Willie Isa to Castleford Tigers
- Sinbad Kali to Released
- Blake Leary to North Queensland Cowboys
- Jeff Lima to Wigan Warriors
- Luke MacDougall to Saracens (rugby)
- Billy Rogers to Parramatta Eels
- Aiden Tolman to Canterbury-Bankstown Bulldogs
- Brett White to Canberra Raiders

Gains

- Jack Afamasaga from RC Lescure-Arthes XIII (mid season)
- Maurice Blair from Penrith Panthers
- Beau Champion from South Sydney Rabbitohs
- Jaiman Lowe from South Sydney Rabbitohs
- Elijah Niko from New Zealand Warriors
- Troy Thompson from Canberra Raiders
- Sisa Waqa from Unattached (Note: Previously played for Sydney Roosters in 2009, but did not have a professional sporting contract in 2010.)
- Adam Woolnough from Retirement

== Representative honours ==
This table lists all players who have played a representative match in 2011.

Player	2011 All Stars match	2011 ANZAC Test	City vs Country Origin	State of Origin 1	State of Origin 2	State of Origin 3	2011 Four Nations
Adam Blair	—N/a	New Zealand	—N/a	—N/a	—N/a	—N/a	New Zealand
Beau Champion	Indigenous All Stars	—N/a	City	—N/a	—N/a	—N/a	—N/a
Cooper Cronk	—N/a	Australia	—N/a	Queensland	Queensland	Queensland	Australia
Matt Duffie	—N/a	New Zealand	—N/a	—N/a	—N/a	—N/a	—N/a
Ryan Hinchcliffe	—N/a	—N/a	Country	—N/a	—N/a	—N/a	—N/a
Sika Manu	—N/a	—N/a	—N/a	—N/a	—N/a	—N/a	New Zealand
Dane Nielsen	—N/a	—N/a	—N/a	Queensland	Queensland	—N/a	—N/a
Kevin Proctor	—N/a	—N/a	—N/a	—N/a	—N/a	—N/a	New Zealand (Note: Proctor was named in the New Zealand squad for the tournament, but did not play a match in the series.)
Billy Slater	—N/a	Australia	—N/a	Queensland	Queensland	Queensland	Australia
Cameron Smith	NRL All Stars	Australia	—N/a	Queensland	Queensland	Queensland	Australia
Gareth Widdop	—N/a	—N/a	—N/a	—N/a	—N/a	—N/a	England

== Statistics ==
This table contains playing statistics for all Melbourne Storm players to have played in the 2011 NRL season.

- Statistics sources:

Name	Appearances	Tries	Goals	Field goals	Points
Jack Afamasaga	1	0	0	0	0
Adam Blair	23	1	0	0	4
Maurice Blair	14	3	0	0	12
Jesse Bromwich	22	4	0	0	16
Beau Champion	16	8	0	0	32
Dane Chisholm	1	0	0	0	0
Cooper Cronk	23	12	0	2	50
Matthew Duffie	18	12	1	0	50
Ryan Hinchcliffe	25	4	0	0	16
Sione Kite	1	0	0	0	0
Rory Kostjasyn	12	0	0	0	0
Jaiman Lowe	23	0	0	0	0
Todd Lowrie	19	1	0	0	4
Sika Manu	18	5	0	0	20
Dane Nielsen	24	6	0	0	24
Bryan Norrie	24	2	0	0	8
Justin O'Neill	12	5	0	0	20
Kevin Proctor	26	4	0	0	16
Anthony Quinn	15	6	0	0	24
Robbie Rochow	1	0	0	0	0
Billy Slater	24	12	0	0	48
Cameron Smith	24	2	78	0	164
Chase Stanley	1	1	0	0	4
Troy Thompson	7	0	0	0	0
Atelea Vea	11	0	0	0	0
Sisa Waqa	10	4	0	0	16
Gareth Widdop	25	2	7	1	23
Adam Woolnough	21	0	0	0	0
28 players used	–	94	86	3	551

=== Scorers ===
Most points in a game: 16 points

- Round 2 – Cameron Smith (1 try, 6 goals) vs Gold Coast Titans

Most tries in a game: 3

- Round 23 – Cooper Cronk vs Gold Coast Titans

=== Winning games ===
Highest score in a winning game: 42 points

- Round 8 vs Newcastle Knights

Lowest score in a winning game: 8 points

- Round 24 vs St George Illawarra Dragons

Greatest winning margin: 38 points

- Round 5 vs Parramatta Eels

Greatest number of games won consecutively: 12

- Round 12 – Round 24

=== Losing games ===
Highest score in a losing game: 14 points

- Round 7 vs New Zealand Warriors

Lowest score in a losing game: 4 points

- Round 25 vs Manly Warringah Sea Eagles

Greatest losing margin: 32 points

- Round 26 vs Sydney Roosters

Greatest number of games lost consecutively: 2

- Round 25 – Round 26

== NRL Under 20s ==
In the fourth season of the NRL's National Youth Championship, Dean Pay continued as coach for a second season, with Melbourne finishing the regular season in 4th place on the ladder to qualify for the finals. Kenny Bromwich would make the competition's team of the year, selected as an interchange player.

=== Ladder ===
2011 National Youth Competition season
Pos.	Team	Pld	W	D	L	B	PF	PA	PD	Pts
1	New Zealand Warriors (P)	24	19	1	4	2	851	494	+357	43
2	North Queensland Cowboys	24	17	0	7	2	758	509	+249	38
3	Cronulla-Sutherland Sharks	24	16	1	7	2	707	600	+107	37
4	Melbourne Storm	24	16	0	8	2	678	517	+161	36
5	Sydney Roosters	24	15	1	8	2	639	523	+116	35
6	Canterbury-Bankstown Bulldogs	24	14	0	10	2	659	458	+201	32
7	Wests Tigers	24	12	2	10	2	607	529	+78	30
8	Newcastle Knights	24	12	1	11	2	638	660	-22	29
9	Brisbane Broncos	24	11	2	11	2	752	551	+201	28
10	Penrith Panthers	24	12	0	12	2	558	709	-151	28
11	St. George Illawarra Dragons	24	10	2	12	2	562	594	-32	26
12	Parramatta Eels	24	10	1	13	2	547	556	-9	25
13	Canberra Raiders	24	8	1	15	2	683	749	-66	21
14	Gold Coast Titans	24	5	1	18	2	467	779	-312	15
15	South Sydney Rabbitohs	24	4	1	19	2	454	881	-427	13
16	Manly Warringah Sea Eagles	24	4	0	20	2	432	843	-411	12

=== Finals ===
Qualifying final 11 September 2011	Melbourne Storm	26–10	Sydney Roosters	AAMI Park, Melbourne
1:30pm AEST	Tries: Mahe Fonua; Tohu Harris; John Leiataua; Matt McGahan; Young Tonumaipea; Goals: Matt McGahan 3/6		Tries: Ethan Lowek; Curtis Rona; Goals: Ethan Lowe 1/2	Referee: David Munro

Semi final 17 September 2011	Melbourne Storm	20–22	Canterbury-Bankstown Bulldogs	Suncorp Stadium, Brisbane
4:15pm AEST	Tries: Denny Solomona (3); Sean Loxley; Goals: Matt McGahan 2/4		Tries: Daniel Abou-Sleiman; Sam Ahofono; Sean Deaves; Ed Murphy; Goals: Jaline Graham 3/4	Referee: David Munro

=== Statistics ===
==== Scorers ====
Most points in a game: 16 points

- Round 2 – Matt McGahan (1 try, 6 goals) vs Gold Coast Titans

Most tries in a game: 3

- Round 1 – Ben Hampton vs Manly Warringah Sea Eagles
- Round 7 – Slade Griffin vs New Zealand Warriors
- Round 13 – Young Tonumaipea vs South Sydney Rabbitohs
- Round 14 – Ryan Pooley vs Sydney Roosters
- Round 20 – Tohu Harris vs Brisbane Broncos
- Qualifying final – Denny Solomona vs Sydney Roosters

Most points (season): 212

- Matt McGahan (8 tries, 90 goals)

Most tries (season): 18

- Mahe Fonua

==== Winning games ====
Highest score in a winning game: 46 points

- Round 8 vs Newcastle Knights

Lowest score in a winning game: 22 points

- Round 5 vs Parramatta Eels
- Round 23 vs Gold Coast Titans

Greatest winning margin: 40 points

- Round 25 vs Manly Warringah Sea Eagles

Greatest number of games won consecutively: 7

- Round 4 – Round 10

==== Losing games ====
Highest score in a losing game: 28 points

- Round 12 vs Cronulla-Sutherland Sharks

Lowest score in a losing game: 12 points

- Round 3 vs North Queensland Cowboys
- Round 5 vs Parramatta Eels
- Round 24 vs St George Illawarra Dragons

Greatest losing margin: 40 points

- Round 15 vs Wests Tigers

Greatest number of games lost consecutively: 2

- Round 15 – Round 16
- Round 21 – Round 22

== Feeder clubs ==
As announced by the club after the 2010 season, Melbourne ended their reserve grade program in the NSW Cup, announcing new feeder club agreements. Reserve players were sent to either Easts Tigers to play in the Queensland Cup, or to play in NSW Cup in a combined side with the Cronulla-Sutherland Sharks.

In the NSW Cup, Cronulla coached by Tony Herman would finish third on the ladder after the regular season, progressing through the preliminary final where they were defeated 30–26 in golden point extra time by eventual runners-up the Auckland Vulcans.

2011 New South Wales Cup
Pos	Team	Pld	W	D	L	B	PF	PA	PD	Pts
3	Cronulla Sharks	23	16	1	6	2	656	447	+209	37

In the Queensland Cup, Easts Tigers coached by Troy McCarthy improved with the addition of Melbourne Storm players, finishing in eighth position on the ladder, winning more games than in the 2010 season.

2011 Queensland Cup
Pos	Team	Pld	W	D	L	PF	PA	PD	Pts
8	Easts Tigers	22	8	1	13	428	524	-96	17

== S. G. Ball Cup ==
Melbourne's junior representative team in the New South Wales Rugby League under-18s competition S. G. Ball Cup struggled in their third season in the competition. Coached by club high performance manager Kim Williams, the team would win only two of their nine matches for the season, finishing in 14th place on the ladder out of the 18 teams competing.

== Awards ==
=== Trophy Cabinet ===
- 2011 J. J. Giltinan Shield
- NRL Club Championship (Note: Awarded to the club with the most competition points across the NRL and NRL Under-20s season)

=== Melbourne Storm Awards Night ===
- Melbourne Storm Player of the Year: Cameron Smith
- Melbourne Storm Rookie of the Year: Gareth Widdop & Jesse Bromwich
- Melbourne Storm Members' Player of Year: Cooper Cronk
- Most Improved: Kevin Proctor
- Best Forward: Ryan Hinchcliffe
- Best Back: Billy Slater
- Best Try: Anthony Quinn vs Gold Coast Titans (Round 2)
- Darren Bell U20s Player of the Year: Slade Griffin
- U20s Best Forward: Krys Freeman
- U20s Best Back: Kirisome Auva'a
- Greg Brentnall Young Achievers Award: Mahe Fonua
- Mick Moore Club Person of the Year: Robbie Kearns
- Life Member Inductees: Peter Robinson, Billy Slater, Jonce Dimovski

=== Dally M Awards Night ===
- Dally M Medal: Billy Slater
- Dally M Fullback of the Year: Billy Slater
- Dally M Captain of the Year: Cameron Smith
- Dally M Hooker of the Year: Cameron Smith
- Dally M Representative Player of the Year: Cameron Smith
- Dally M Halfback of the Year: Cooper Cronk
- Dally M Coach of the Year of the Year: Craig Bellamy

=== RLIF Awards ===
- RLIF Player of the Year: Billy Slater
- RLIF Fullback of the Year: Billy Slater
- RLIF Hooker of the Year: Cameron Smith

=== Additional Awards ===
- Wally Lewis Medal: Cameron Smith
