= 2009 NRL Under-20s season =

2009 National Youth Competition
- Teams: 16
- Premiers: Melbourne (1st title)
- Minor premiers: Manly (1st title)
- Matches played: 201
- Points scored: 11082
- Wooden spoon: Cronulla (1st spoon)
- Player of the Year: Beau Henry
- Top point-scorer: Jake Mullaney (308)
- Top try-scorer: Jake Mullaney (27)

The 2009 NRL Under-20s season was the second season of the NRL Under-20s competition. The Competition, known as the Toyota Cup for sponsorship purposes, is solely for under-20 players. The draw and structure of the competition mirrors that of its first grade counterpart, the National Rugby League.

== Ladder ==
National Youth Competition season 2009
Pos	Team	Pld	W	D	L	B	PF	PA	PD	Pts
1	Manly Warringah Sea Eagles	24	19	1	4	2	879	417	+462	43
2	St. George Illawarra Dragons	24	19	0	5	2	758	461	+297	42
3	Melbourne Storm (P)	24	19	0	5	2	833	597	+236	42
4	Wests Tigers	24	15	1	8	2	709	588	+121	35
5	Brisbane Broncos	24	15	0	9	2	698	551	+147	34
6	South Sydney Rabbitohs	24	13	1	10	2	776	568	+208	31
7	New Zealand Warriors	24	13	1	10	2	725	612	+113	31
8	Canberra Raiders	24	11	2	11	2	706	685	+21	28
9	North Queensland Cowboys	24	12	0	12	2	668	683	-15	28
10	Newcastle Knights	24	9	1	14	2	596	756	-160	23
11	Canterbury Bulldogs	24	9	1	14	2	649	867	-218	23
12	Parramatta Eels	24	8	0	16	2	604	698	-94	20
13	Penrith Panthers	24	8	0	16	2	573	755	-182	20
14	Gold Coast Titans	24	8	0	16	2	542	738	-196	20
15	Sydney Roosters	24	6	0	18	2	443	736	-293	16
16	Cronulla-Sutherland Sharks	24	4	0	20	2	391	838	-447	12

=== Ladder progression ===
Numbers highlighted in green indicate that the team finished the round inside the top 8.

National Youth Competition season 2009
	Team	1	2	3	4	5	6	7	8	9	10	11	12	13	14	15	16	17	18	19	20	21	22	23	24	25	26
1	Manly	2	4	6	8	10	12	14	14	14	16	18	20	22	24	25	27	29	31	33	35	37	37	39	39	41	43
2	St. George Illawarra	0	0	2	4	6	8	10	12	14	16	18	18	20	22	24	26	28	28	30	32	32	34	36	38	40	42
3	Melbourne	2	4	4	6	8	10	12	14	16	16	18	20	22	24	24	24	26	28	30	32	32	34	36	38	40	42
4	Wests Tigers	0	2	4	6	6	6	8	8	10	12	12	13	15	17	19	19	21	23	25	27	27	29	31	31	33	35
5	Brisbane	0	0	0	0	0	2	4	4	6	8	10	12	12	14	16	18	20	22	24	26	28	30	32	32	32	34
6	South Sydney	2	4	4	4	4	4	6	8	10	10	10	11	13	13	15	17	17	19	19	21	23	25	27	29	29	31
7	New Zealand	0	0	2	4	4	6	6	6	8	10	10	11	13	15	17	19	19	21	21	23	23	25	27	29	31	31
8	Canberra	2	4	6	8	8	8	8	8	10	12	14	15	17	19	20	22	24	26	26	26	26	26	26	26	28	28
9	North Queensland	2	2	4	4	4	6	6	8	8	8	10	12	12	12	12	14	16	18	18	20	22	22	24	24	26	28
10	Newcastle	0	0	2	2	4	4	4	6	8	8	8	9	11	11	13	13	13	13	15	15	17	19	19	21	21	23
11	Bulldogs	0	2	2	4	6	8	10	12	14	14	14	15	17	17	17	17	17	17	17	19	19	21	21	23	23	23
12	Parramatta	2	2	2	4	4	4	4	4	6	6	8	10	10	10	12	12	14	16	16	16	16	16	16	18	20	20
13	Penrith	0	0	0	0	0	0	2	4	6	8	10	12	12	12	14	16	16	16	18	18	20	20	20	20	20	20
14	Gold Coast	2	4	6	6	8	10	10	10	10	10	10	12	12	14	16	16	16	16	18	18	18	18	18	20	20	20
15	Sydney	0	0	0	0	2	2	2	4	4	6	6	8	8	8	10	12	12	14	16	16	16	16	16	16	16	16
16	Cronulla	2	4	4	4	6	6	6	6	8	8	8	8	8	8	8	8	8	10	10	10	12	12	12	12	12	12

== Finals series ==
The NYC finals series adopts the McIntyre final eight system just like its first grade counterpart, the National Rugby League.

Qualifying finals
1	Manly	28
8	Canberra Raiders	32
2	St. George Illawarra	48
7	NZ Warriors	24
3	Melbourne Storm	54
6	South Sydney	18
4	Wests Tigers	22
5	Brisbane Broncos	46

Semifinals
4W	Canberra Raiders	34
2L	Wests Tigers	42
3W	Brisbane Broncos	24
1L	Manly	10

Preliminary finals
1W	St. George Illawarra	12
Wests Tigers	36
2W	Melbourne Storm	40
Brisbane Broncos	16

Final
Wests Tigers	22
Melbourne Storm	24

Home	Score	Away	Match Information
Home	Score	Away	Date and Time	Venue	Referee
Qualifying Finals
Melbourne Storm	54-18	South Sydney Rabbitohs	11 September 2009, 5:30pm	Etihad Stadium, Melbourne	Gavin Reynolds
Wests Tigers	22-46	Brisbane Broncos	12 September 2009, 4:15pm	Skilled Park, Robina	Chris Butler
Manly-Warringah Sea Eagles	28-32	Canberra Raiders	12 September 2009, 6:15pm	ANZ Stadium, Sydney	Gavin Morris
St. George Illawarra Dragons	48-24	New Zealand Warriors	13 September 2009, 1:45pm	WIN Jubilee Oval, Kogarah	Adam Devcich
Semi-finals
Canberra Raiders	34-42	Wests Tigers	18 September 2009, 5:30pm	Sydney Football Stadium, Sydney	Gavin Reynolds
Brisbane Broncos	24-10	Manly-Warringah Sea Eagles	19 September 2009, 5:30pm	Suncorp Stadium, Brisbane	Adam Devcich
Preliminary Finals
St. George Illawarra Dragons	12-36	Wests Tigers	25 September 2009, 5:30pm	ANZ Stadium, Sydney	Gavin Reynolds
Melbourne Storm	40-16	Brisbane Broncos	26 September 2009, 5:30pm	Etihad Stadium, Melbourne	Adam Devcich
Grand Final
Melbourne Storm	24-22	Wests Tigers	4 October 2009, 2:10pm	ANZ Stadium, Sydney	Gavin Reynolds

=== Grand Final ===
Melbourne Storm	Position	Wests Tigers
Gareth Widdop	FB	Jake Mullaney
Sam Joe	WG	Joel Jackson
Justin O'Neill	CE	Joel Wisbey
Pita Maile	CE	Jake Clarke
Matt Duffie	WG	Sama Sauvao
Dane Chisholm	FE	Robert Lui
Luke Kelly (c)	HB	Darren Nicholls (c)
Pulou Vaituutuu	PR	Andrew Fifita
James Woolford	HK	Chris Corby
Jesse Bromwich	PR	Aaron Woods
Rob Rochow	SR	Simon Dwyer
Theodore Stuart	SR	Jason Schirnack
Billy Rogers	LK	Matt Hyland
Jai Jones-Wiegold	Bench	Jay Florimo
Jordan McLean	Bench	Monikura Tikinau
Kevin Proctor	Bench	David Fifita
Fred Makimare	Bench	Rhys Curran
Brad Arthur	Coach	Grant Jones

English-born Melbourne young gun Gareth Widdop clinched the Toyota Cup grand final for the Storm with a 74th minute try and pressure conversion, his side downing the Wests Tigers 24-22 on Sunday.

Widdop finger-nailed a late grubber - his second try of the match - to draw his side level at 22-22 before calmly potting the conversion and delivering the second version of the national under-20s competition to Melbourne.

The Storm scored four of their five tries in the first half to lead 18-10 at the break before a burst of two four-pointers in three minutes from the Tigers took them to a 22-18 lead after 56 minutes.

The Tigers had looked to be coming home with a wet sail before Widdop, who missed three first-half conversions, made the difference in a match where the lead changed five times.

The match became a virtual showdown between two gun fullbacks as Wests Tigers tryscoring machine Jake Mullaney took his season tally to 29 tries from 27 games in 2009 with a double of his own.

The speedy Tigers fullback also scored a try on either side of halftime and set up five-eighth Robert Lui's four-pointer for the Tigers' second-half lead.

Melbourne, who finished third in the regular season, had held the ascendancy before that, and led 18-10 at the break with, ironically, Widdop's goal-kicking letting his side down.

The Storm had also been denied three times in the first half, twice with players held up, but scored tries through winger Matt Duffie, lock Billy Rogers, Gareth Widdop and centre Justin O'Neill.

Melbourne Storm 24 (Gareth Widdop 2, Matt Duffie, Billy Rogers, Justin O'Neill tries; Gareth Widdop 2/5 goals)

Wests Tigers 22 (Jake Mullaney 2, Rhys Curran, Robert Lui tries; Jake Mullaney 3/4 goals)

Half-Time: Melbourne 18-10

Jack Gibson Medal: Luke Kelly

== Club and Player Statistics ==
=== Leading try scorers ===
Top 10 try scorers
Pos	Name	Tries	Team
1	Jake Mullaney	29	Wests Tigers
2	Kane Morgan	26	South Sydney
3	Matt Duffie	25	Melbourne
4=	Taioalo Vaivai	20	South Sydney
4=	Joe Vickery	20	St. George Illawarra
6=	Kane Linnett	18	St. George Illawarra
6=	Gareth Widdop	18	Melbourne
8=	Pakisonasi Afu	17	Bulldogs
8=	Daly Cherry-Evans	17	Manly
8=	Obe Geia	17	North Queensland
8=	Beau Henry	17	St. George Illawarra
8=	Shaun Johnson	17	New Zealand

=== Leading point scorers ===
Top 10 overall point scorers
	Player	Team	T	G	FG	Pts
1	Jake Mullaney	Wests Tigers	29	103	-	322
2	Gareth Widdop	Melbourne	18	111	-	294
3	Beau Henry	St. George Illawarra	17	90	-	248
4	Shaun Johnson	New Zealand	17	84	1	237
5=	Mitchell Porter	Manly	8	76	-	184
5=	Stirling Siejka	Penrith	5	82	-	184
7	Peter Mata'utia	Newcastle	12	64	-	176
8	Michael Picker	Canberra	10	63	-	166
9=	Jordan Rankin	Gold Coast	5	64	-	148
9=	Taioalo Vaivai	South Sydney	20	34	-	148
9=	Troyden Watene	North Queensland	7	60	-	148

=== Leading goal scorers ===
Top 10 goal scorers
Pos	Name	Goals	Team
1	Gareth Widdop	111	Melbourne
2	Jake Mullaney	103	Wests Tigers
3	Beau Henry	90	St. George Illawarra
4	Shaun Johnson	84	New Zealand
5	Stirling Siejka	82	Penrith
6	Mitchell Porter	76	Manly
7=	Peter Mata'utia	64	Newcastle
7=	Jordan Rankin	64	Gold Coast
9=	Michael Picker	63	Canberra
9=	Troyden Watene	60	North Queensland

=== Leading field goal scorers ===
Top 10 field goal scorers
Pos	Name	FG's	Team
1	Daly Cherry-Evans	3	Manly
2	Darren Nicholls	2	Wests Tigers
3=	Ben Cronin	1	North Queensland
3=	Rhys Jack	1	Bulldogs
3=	Shaun Johnson	1	New Zealand
3=	Luke Kelly	1	Melbourne
3=	Robert Lui	1	Wests Tigers
3=	Ben Murray	1	Sydney
3=	Shane Pumipi	1	Cronulla
3=	Harry Siejka	1	Penrith
3=	Ray Thompson	1	North Queensland

=== Biggest Wins ===
Top 10 biggest winning margins
Pos	Winning team	Losing team	Round	Score	Margin
1	Manly	Cronulla	25	64-10	54
2=	Manly	New Zealand	2	52-4	48
2=	Manly	Bulldogs	17	64-16	48
2=	New Zealand	Gold Coast	22	52-4	48
2=	Parramatta	Cronulla	12	52-4	48
2=	St. George Illawarra	Sydney	17	58-10	48
7=	Manly	Sydney	23	56-10	46
7=	North Queensland	Cronulla	17	56-10	46
9	South Sydney	Gold Coast	8	50-6	44
10=	Manly	Sydney	13	42-0	42
10=	Wests Tigers	Bulldogs	26	58-16	42

=== Winning Streaks ===
Winning streak still active

Top 5 longest winning streaks
Pos	Team	First win	Round	Last win	Round	Games won
1=	Brisbane	40-16 vs Bulldogs	14	48-24 vs Penrith	23	9
1=	St. George Illawarra	36-12 vs Penrith	3	34-22 vs Cronulla	11	9
3	Melbourne	40-26 vs North Queensland	22	24-22 vs Wests Tigers	GF	8
4=	Manly	40-20 vs Bulldogs	1	26-22 vs North Queensland	7	7
4=	St. George Illawarra	34-22 vs Melbourne	21	48-24 vs New Zealand	QF	7

- QF = Qualifying Finals
- GF = Grand Final

=== Losing Streaks ===
Losing streak still active

Top 5 longest losing streaks
Pos	Team	First Loss	Round	Last Loss	Round	Games lost
1	Cronulla	24-16 vs North Queensland	6	44-12 vs Melbourne	20	13
2	Sydney	48-10 vs South Sydney	20	58-26 vs North Queensland	26	7
3=	Bulldogs	40-16 vs Brisbane	14	28-16 vs Gold Coast	19	6
3=	Canberra	28-14 vs Penrith	19	28-24 vs New Zealand	24	6
3=	Gold Coast	22-16 vs Penrith	7	28-6 vs St. George Illawarra	13	6
3=	Penrith	20-16 vs Cronulla	1	34-30 vs Brisbane	6	6

== Awards ==
=== Toyota Cup Player of the Year ===
The winner of the award is decided by the most votes during the year as decided by the referee of each game on a 3-2-1 basis for each game played throughout the regular season.

Winner:

=== Toyota Cup team Of The Year ===
The Toyota Cup team of the Year is voted on by the 16 Toyota Cup coaches, with the players with the highest votes in each position selected.

Position	Player	Club
Fullback	Malcolm Webster	South Sydney
Wing	Joe Vickery	St. George Illawarra
Centre	Taioalo Vaivai	South Sydney
Centre	Siuatonga Likiliki	New Zealand
Wing	Drury Low	Canberra
Five-Eight	Robert Lui	Wests Tigers
Halfback	Beau Henry	St. George Illawarra
Front Row	Trent Merrin	St. George Illawarra
Hooker	Travis Waddell	Canberra
Front Row	Jesse Bromwich	Melbourne
Second Row	Jake Marketo	St. George Illawarra
Second Row	Jared Waerea-Hargreaves	Manly
Lock	Jamie Buhrer	Manly
Bench	Kieran Foran	Manly
Bench	Joel Romelo	Penrith
Bench	Gareth Widdop	Melbourne
Bench	Daly Cherry-Evans	Manly

== See also ==
- 2009 NRL Under-20s season results
- 2009 NRL season
- 2009 Dally M Awards
- 2009 in rugby league
