= Mal Meninga Medal =

The Mal Meninga Medal is the name of the award that goes to the Canberra Raiders' Player of the Year. The award was named after former Raiders captain and coach, Mal Meninga and was first awarded in 2008. Before this there was no name for the award but was still awarded. The medal is awarded to the player that received the most votes during the season, players after each match vote for the best player in the team for the match with the player with the most votes getting 3 points, the next best gets 2, and third gets 1. If the votes are tied at the end of the season the medal is awarded to both players, this has happened only four times, 2005, 2009, 2016 and 2020.

== List of recipients ==
Season	Winner
1982	Jon Hardy
1983	Steve O'Callaghan
1984	Chris O'Sullivan
1985	Chris O'Sullivan
1986	Gary Belcher
1987	Gary Belcher
1988	Ricky Stuart
1989	Bradley Clyde
1990	Laurie Daley
1991	Steve Walters
1992	Ricky Stuart
1993	Ricky Stuart
1994	John Lomax
1995	Laurie Daley
1996	Laurie Daley
1997	Laurie Daley
1998	Mark McLinden
1999	Laurie Daley
2000	Jason Croker
2001	Clinton Schifcofske
2002	Ruben Wiki
2003	Ruben Wiki
2004	Clinton Schifcofske
2005	Troy Thompson; Josh Miller
2006	Alan Tongue
2007	Scott Logan
2008	Joel Monaghan
2009	Josh Dugan; Josh Miller
2010	David Shillington
2011	Shaun Fensom
2012	Shaun Fensom
2013	Anthony Milford
2014	Jarrod Croker
2015	Sia Soliola
2016	Josh Hodgson; Josh Papalii
2017	Junior Paulo
2018	Josh Papalii
2019	Josh Papalii
2020	Jack Wighton; Josh Papalii
2021	Jordan Rapana
2022	Joseph Tapine
2023	Joseph Tapine
2024	Joseph Tapine
2025	Joseph Tapine
2026	Simi Sasagi

Players who have received the medal more than once:

- Laurie Daley = 5
- Josh Papalii = 4
- Joseph Tapine = 4
- Ricky Stuart = 3
- Chris O'Sullivan = 2
- Gary Belcher = 2
- Ruben Wiki = 2
- Clinton Schifcofske = 2
- Josh Miller = 2
- Shaun Fensom = 2
