= Josh Dugan =

Australia international rugby league footballer

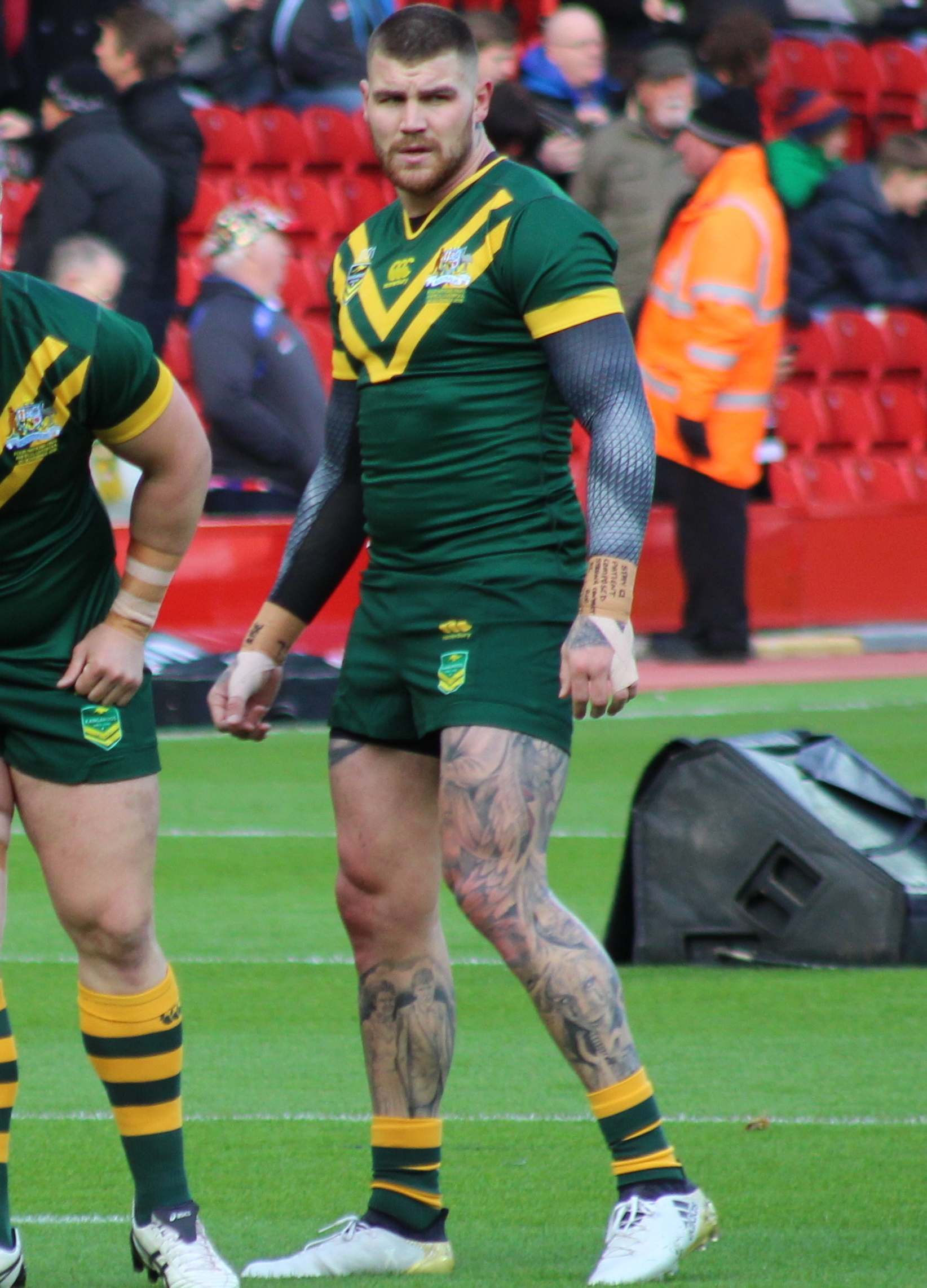

Personal information
- Full name: Josh Dugan
- Born: 11 May 1990 (age 36) Garran, ACT, Australia
- Height: 189 cm (6 ft 2 1/2 in)
- Weight: 102 kg (16 st 1 lb)

Playing information
- Position: Fullback, Centre
Club
Years	Team	Pld	T	G	FG	P
2009–13	Canberra Raiders	70	27	7	1	123
2013–17	St George Illawarra	84	28	17	0	146
2018–21	Cronulla Sharks	61	24	0	0	96
	Total	215	79	24	1	365
Representative
Years	Team	Pld	T	G	FG	P
2009–16	Prime Minister's XIII	2	2	0	0	8
2010–11	NSW Country Origin	2	1	0	0	4
2011–12	NRL All Stars	2	2	0	0	8
2011–17	New South Wales	12	3	0	0	12
2015–17	Australia	12	7	0	0	28
- Source: As of 26 May 2021

Joshua Dugan (born 10 May 1990) is an Australian former professional rugby league footballer who last played as a fullback and centre for the Cronulla-Sutherland Sharks in the NRL and Australia at international level.

He previously played for the Canberra Raiders and the St George Illawarra Dragons in the National Rugby League, and has played at representative level for the Prime Minister's XIII, Country Origin, NRL All Stars and New South Wales in the State of Origin series.

== Early years ==
Dugan was born in Garran, Australian Capital Territory.

He played his junior rugby league for the Valley Dragons and South Tuggeranong Knights before being signed by the Canberra Raiders. Dugan also played Rugby Union for Marist College Canberra. After being signed by the Raiders, Dugan played in their NYC team in 2008 and 2009, scoring 25 tries and kicking 107 goals in 25 games. Dugan played in the Raiders' NYC Grand Final win over the Brisbane Broncos, scoring a try and kicking 4 goals.

== Playing career ==
=== 2009 ===
In Round 3 of the 2009 NRL season, Dugan made his NRL debut for the Canberra Raiders against the North Queensland Cowboys, playing at fullback in the Raiders 23–18 win at Canberra Stadium. After his debut, he established his position at fullback in the Raiders' NRL team. In Round 21 against the Brisbane Broncos, Dugan scored his first NRL career try in the Raiders demolishing 56–0 win at Canberra Stadium. Dugan finished the season 8th in the NRL in tackle breaks, 110, 1st in average running metres per game, 191.5, 7th in total running metres, 3064, 1st in average kick return metres per game, 82.5 and finished 3rd in overall kick return metres, 1321, only behind Billy Slater and Jarryd Hayne. He was also short-listed for the Dally M Rookie of the Year Award in what was an impressive debut season. At the conclusion of the season, Dugan was named the Raiders' Rookie of the Year and was the joint winner of the Mal Meninga Medal for the Raiders Player of the Year Award along with Josh Miller. Dugan finished his debut year in the NRL with him playing in 16 matches, scoring 1 try and kicking 5 goals. In September, he played for the Prime Minister's XIII team against Papua New Guinea.

=== 2010 ===
In May 2010, Dugan was selected for the Country Origin team to play in the annual City vs Country Origin match. He scored a try on debut and was named the Man of the Match. On 7 June, Dugan was named in the 21-man squad for the New South Wales team for Game 3 of the 2010 State of Origin series. However, he was not selected to play in the match after Parramatta's Jarryd Hayne was cleared over a separate off-field incident. On 13 July, Dugan re-signed with the Raiders on a 2-year contract, ending speculation he was headed to the Sydney Roosters. In Round 19 against the Newcastle Knights, Dugan scored a hat trick in the Raiders 52–18 win at Canberra Stadium. Dugan scored 13 tries from 23 matches in 2010.

=== 2011 ===
On 12 February, Dugan was selected for the NRL All Stars in the annual All Stars Match, scoring a try on debut and won the publicly voted Preston Campbell Medal for Man of the Match. In May, Dugan was again selected for the Country Origin team, playing at fullback in Country's 18–12 win at Albury. Dugan played fullback for New South Wales in Game 1 of the 2011 State of Origin series as the Blues lost 16–12 at Suncorp Stadium. He finished the season having played in 13 matches and scoring 6 tries.

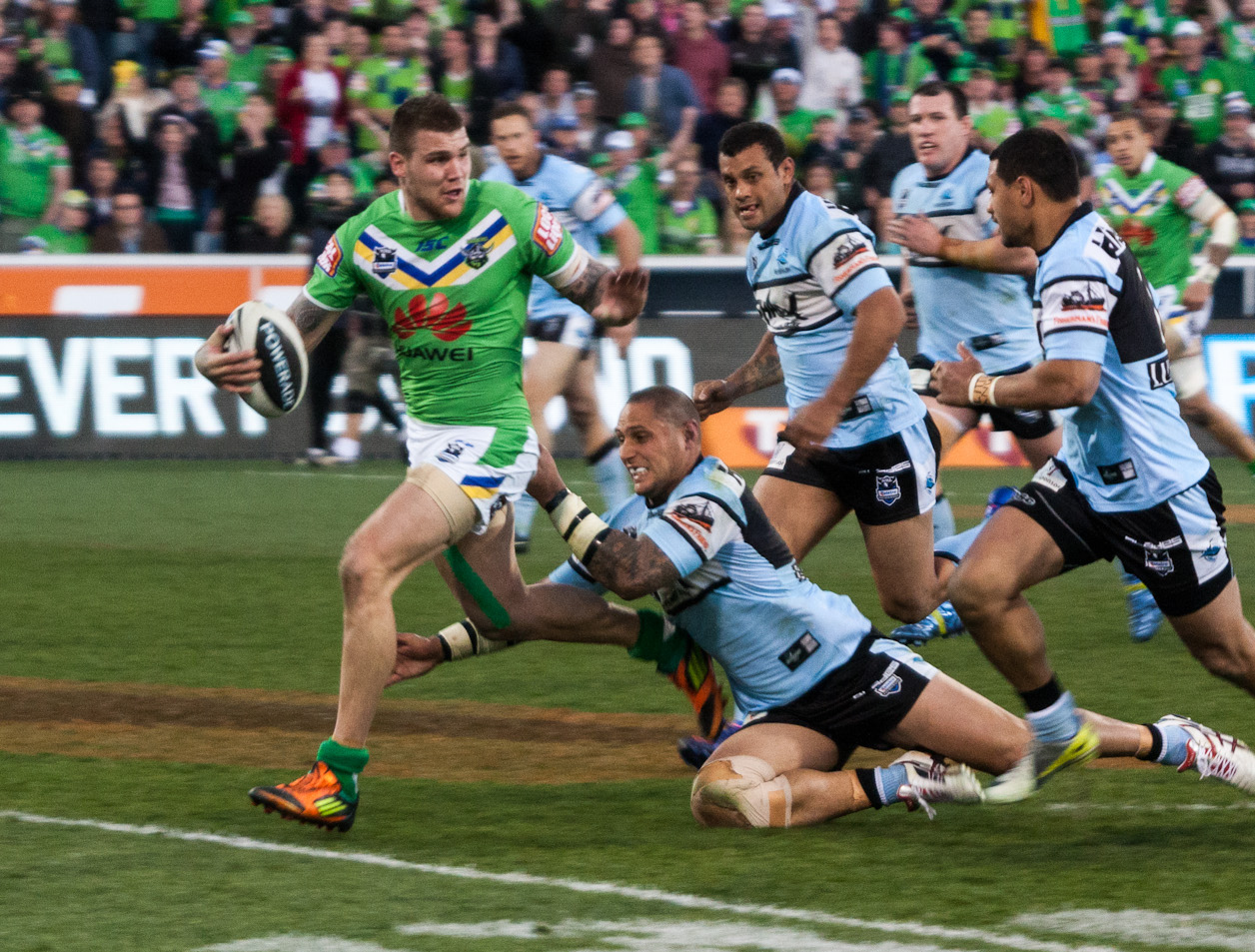
Dugan playing for the Raiders against the Sharks in 2012

=== 2012 ===
In February, Dugan was again selected for the NRL All Stars, scoring a try in the 28–36 loss to the Indigenous All Stars.

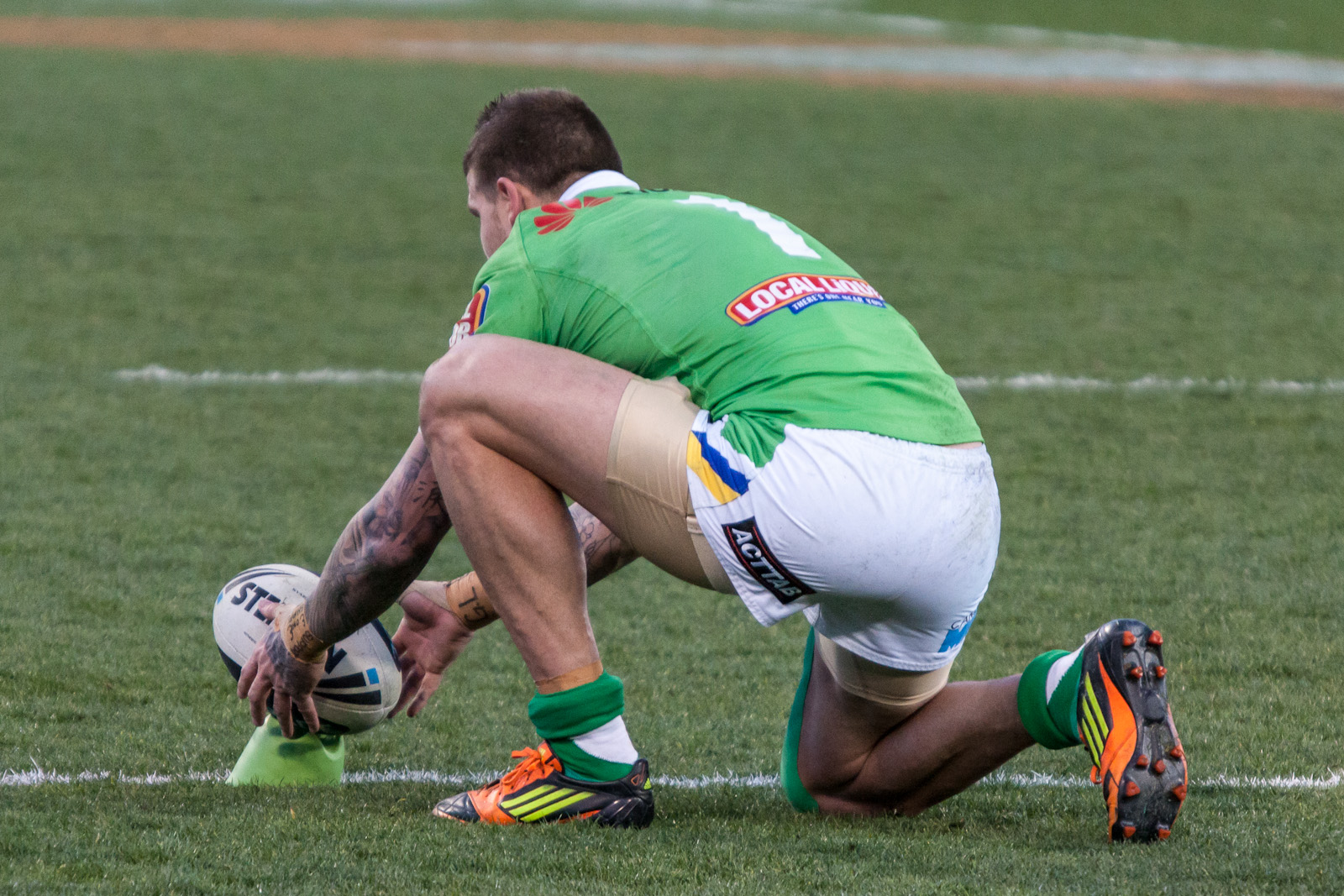
Dugan kicking for goal for Canberra in 2012

He scored 6 tries from 17 games in 2012.

=== 2013 ===
Dugan had his Raiders contract terminated on 14 March following a string of off-field incidents. In April, he was set to sign a $2m, three-year deal with the Brisbane Broncos until an outburst on social media website Instagram cost him a contract. He subsequently signed a contract with the St. George Illawarra Dragons for the remainder of the season on 10 May. In Round 10 he made his debut for the Dragons against the Parramatta Eels, scoring two tries in the Dragons 32–12 win at WIN Stadium. Dugan was selected to play for New South Wales in Game II and Game lll of the 2013 State of Origin series. On 2 August, Dugan extended his contract with the Dragons for another 4 years, that will keep him with the club till the end of the 2017 season. Dugan finished the year with him playing in 10 matches, scoring 6 tries and kicking 11 goals.

=== 2014 ===
On 14 February 2014, Dugan was selected in the Dragons inaugural 2014 Auckland Nines squad. He made a mid-season move to the centres, scoring a hat trick against the Cronulla-Sutherland Sharks in the round 13 30–0 win at WIN Stadium. Subsequently, Dugan was chosen to play at Centre for Game 2 of the 2014 State of Origin series alongside Will Hopoate. Dugan had a solid match in the Blues 6–4 win resulting in the Blues breaking their 8-year losing streak to Queensland. In Game 3 of the series, Dugan scored his first try in origin level in the 32–8 loss at Suncorp Stadium. In Round 23 against his former club, the Canberra Raiders, Dugan scored a try in the Dragons 34–16 win, the Dragons first win in Canberra since Round 14 in the 2000 NRL season. In the Dragons last match of the season against the Newcastle Knights, Dugan was sinned binned for 10 minutes after he got into a physical altercation with Knights halfback Tyrone Roberts. He finished off the season with him playing in 18 matches and scoring 10 tries. At the end of the year, he was selected for the Australia Kangaroos Four Nations train on squad, but failed to play a game due to offseason surgery.

=== 2015 ===
On 21 January 2015, Dugan was named in the Dragons 2015 Auckland Nines squad. In Round 3 against his former club the Canberra Raiders, Dugan played his 100th NRL career match in the Dragons 22–20 win at Canberra Stadium. Dugan returned to his role of fullback for the entirety of the 2015 season. He earned a spot on the wing for Australia, in a losing effort against the New Zealand Kiwis in the annual ANZAC Test at Suncorp Stadium, as well as a recall to fullback for the New South Wales State of Origin team, filling the void left by NFL convert, Jarryd Hayne. He staved off competition from James Tedesco, Matt Moylan, Lachlan Coote and incumbent, long-time Blues winger Brett Morris for the fullback jersey. Midway through 2015, he was named Sportal's best fullback in the NRL. Dugan received the Red V Immortals' Trophy and prestigious New South Wales' Brad Fittler Medal for best performing New South Wales player in the 2015 State of Origin series. He was also nominated for Best Representative Player of 2015, despite losing both the State of Origin series and the ANZAC Test. Struggling with a persistent neck injury, Dugan required off-season surgery to eliminate the possibility of any long-term problems. The surgery was a success. Dugan finished his impressive 2015 NRL season with him playing in 22 matches, scoring 7 tries and kicking 4 goals for the Dragons.

=== 2016 ===
On 29 January, Dugan was named as the captain of the Dragons 2016 Auckland Nines squad. On 6 May 2016, Dugan played for Australia against New Zealand, playing at centre in the 16–0 win at Hunter Stadium. After missing the first 2 matches of the 2016 State of Origin series due to an elbow injury, Dugan played in Game 3 where he played at centre in the last minute 18–14 win at ANZ Stadium even though Queensland won the series from the first 2 matches. Dugan finished the 2016 NRL season with him playing in 17 matches and scoring 2 tries for the Dragons. On 24 September 2016, Dugan for Prime Minister's XIII against Papua New Guinea, playing at centre and scoring in the 58–0 shellacking win in Port Moresby.

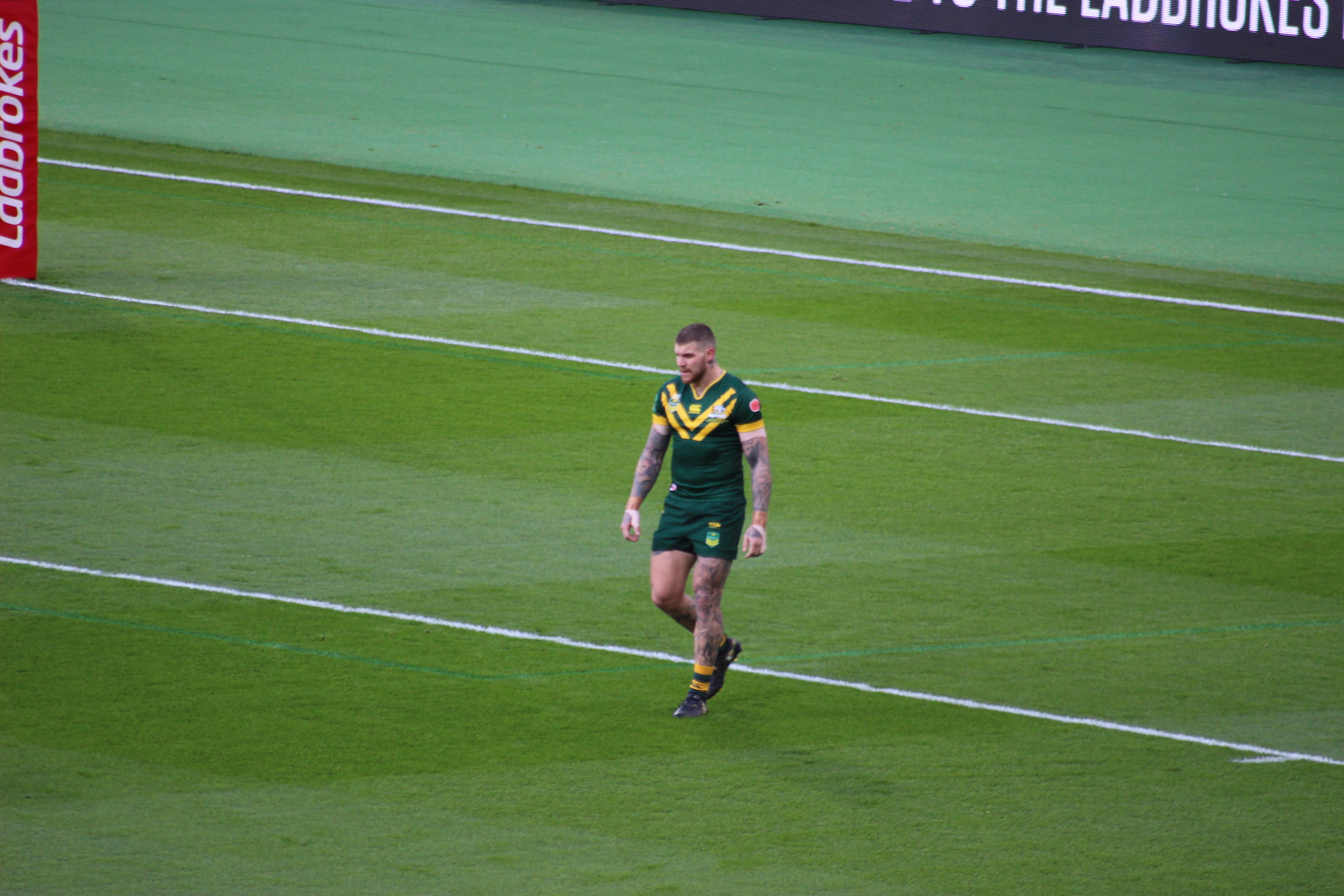
Dugan playing for the Kangaroos against England in 2016

On 4 October 2016, Dugan was selected in the Australia 24-man squad for the 2016 Four Nations series. Dugan played in all 4 matches of tournament and scored 4 tries, 2 of those scored in the Four Nations Final against New Zealand in the 34–8 victory at Anfield.

=== 2017 ===
On 5 May 2017, Dugan played for Australia in the 2017 ANZAC Test against New Zealand, playing at centre and scoring a try in the 30–12 win at Canberra Stadium. On 20 May 2017, Dugan announced that he signed a 4-year contract with the Cronulla-Sutherland Sharks, earning $750,000 a season, starting in 2018. For the 2017 State of Origin series, Dugan was selected in all 3 matches and scored 1 try which was in Game 3 in the Blues 22–6 loss at Suncorp Stadium which resulted in New South Wales losing the series 2–1. A week after the Origin series loss, Dugan alongside Blake Ferguson were highly publicised after the pair reportedly on a boozy day out at the Lennox Point Hotel in Lennox Head on their day-off from Origin camp on a Friday which was 5 days out before their Game 3 series deciding match. It was rumoured that the pair were at the hotel at lunch-time and didn't return to camp till about 10pm and the next day at training were hidden away from the media because they were hungover. The pair claim that they did nothing wrong and were used as scapegoats for the Blues failed campaign. In Round 21 against the Newcastle Knights, Dugan played his 150th NRL career match in the Dragons upset 21–14 loss at Hunter Stadium. In the lead-up to the Dragons must-win clash against the Penrith Panthers in Round 25, Dugan was axed from the team by coach Paul McGregor after he missed the team bus heading for the game, Dugan drove up to Penrith but was too little too late and end up watching on as the Dragons won the close encounter by 16–14. Dugan later returned in Round 26 in the Dragons do-or-die match against the Canterbury-Bankstown Bulldogs at ANZ Stadium where it ended up in tears after they were defeated 26–20 and the Dragons season was ended missing out on a top 8 spot. Dugan finished his last year at the Dragons with him playing in 17 matches, scoring 3 tries and kicking 2 goals in the 2017 NRL season.

=== 2018 ===
In February, Dugan was allegedly thrown out of an RSL for poor behaviour. According to the RSL President and other patrons, Dugan was allegedly swearing and disturbing other RSL members.

In Round 1 of the 2018 NRL season, Dugan made his club debut for the Cronulla-Sutherland Sharks against the North Queensland Cowboys, starting at centre and scoring their season opening try in the 20–14 loss at 1300SMILES Stadium.

Dugan was not selected for the 2018 State of Origin series by new coach Brad Fittler due to injuries and inconsistent form. Fittler also highlighted that NSW in the past had a selfish culture which needed to be changed, he went on to say "It was a selfish culture, there's no doubt about that, because there was a lot of people making decisions for themselves, There's only really two cultures I think, there's one where people think for themselves and about themselves and there's one where people think about their workmates, their colleagues and their teammates".

On 11 September, Dugan was visibly emotional at a press conference where he claimed no matter how hard he has tried to change public perception of himself, his good acts go unnoticed. Dugan went on to say "I have been an easy target since 2013... when I got sacked from Canberra, everyone has had an opinion of me since then and it's never going to change, I raised $15,000 for a young boy recently, visited him in hospital, he passed away, you didn't hear about that".

Dugan ended the 2018 season making 14 appearances for the club and scored 6 tries. Dugan was injured in the week one finals loss to Eastern Suburbs and subsequently missed the rest of Cronulla's finals campaign.

In November, it was revealed by The Daily Telegraph that Cronulla had lost their three main sponsors for the 2019 season which equaled $6 million over five years. It was reported that the sponsorship deal fell through due to Dugan and Andrew Fifita appearing on a podcast back in August 2018 when they called Daily Telegraph columnist Phil Rothfield a "Complete Fuckwit" and that he was "old, weathered and baldheaded".

=== 2019 ===
Dugan made 23 appearances and scored 11 tries for Cronulla in the 2019 NRL season as the club reached the finals.

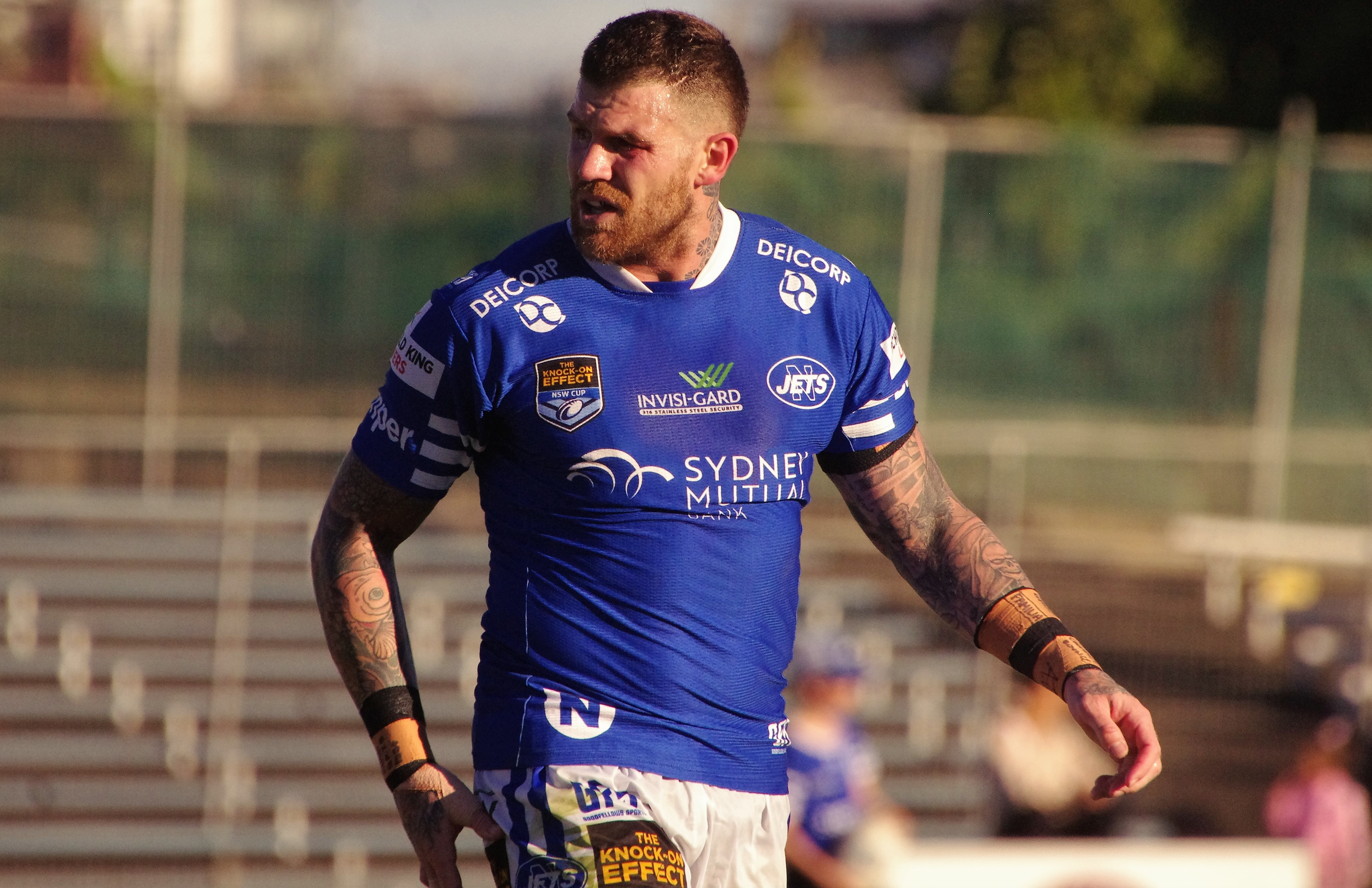
Dugan playing for the Newtown Jets in 2021

Dugan played at fullback in Cronulla's elimination final loss against Manly-Warringah at Brookvale Oval.

On 25 October, it was reported that Dugan had been embroiled in a nightclub incident during an off-season fishing trip to Airlie Beach in far north Queensland. Dugan was allegedly involved in a fight at the Boom nightclub at Airlie Beach with witnesses saying Dugan and a group of his friends were kicked out of the venue. Dugan also allegedly failed to tell his club Cronulla or the NRL integrity unit about the incident.

=== 2020 ===
Dugan played 16 games for Cronulla in the 2020 NRL season as the club finished 8th and qualified for the finals. He played in Cronulla's elimination final loss against Canberra.

=== 2021 ===
On 3 June, Dugan was informed by Cronulla-Sutherland that his services would not be required beyond the 2021 NRL season.

On 29 June, Dugan was placed under investigation by the NRL after visiting a COVID-19 hotspot and breaking the code's stringent biosecurity protocols. Dugan was photographed at a restaurant in Sydney's Eastern Suburbs. A week earlier, the NRL had told all 16 teams that players were not to visit the area. Dugan was later fined $25,000 by the NRL over the incident.

On 21 August, it was alleged that Dugan had breached the NRL's strict biosecurity protocols regarding COVID-19 for a second time. Dugan was allegedly pulled over by NSW Police in Lithgow, around 150 kilometres from his residence. Dugan was instructed by police to head home immediately but was pulled over 40 minutes later driving back towards Lithgow. On 26 August, Dugan was fined $50,000 by the NRL for breaching the codes strict biosecurity protocols. Dugan was also ordered to appear at Lithgow local court on 7 October with charges of not complying with NSW health orders. The court dismissed the charge arising from the first stop; he was convicted of the other offence but no penalty was recorded.

On 10 September, Dugan announced his retirement from the NRL after having his contract terminated by Cronulla as a result of repeated breaches of the NRL's COVID-19 policies.

=== Later years ===
In 2022, Dugan played for Orange United Warriors. He was sent off in a Woodbridge Cup match for punching an opponent after full time.

In 2023, Dugan played for Ivanhoes Knights in Smithfield, Far North Queensland. He was appointed as head coach for 2024.
