= Josh Miller (rugby league) =

Australian rugby league footballer

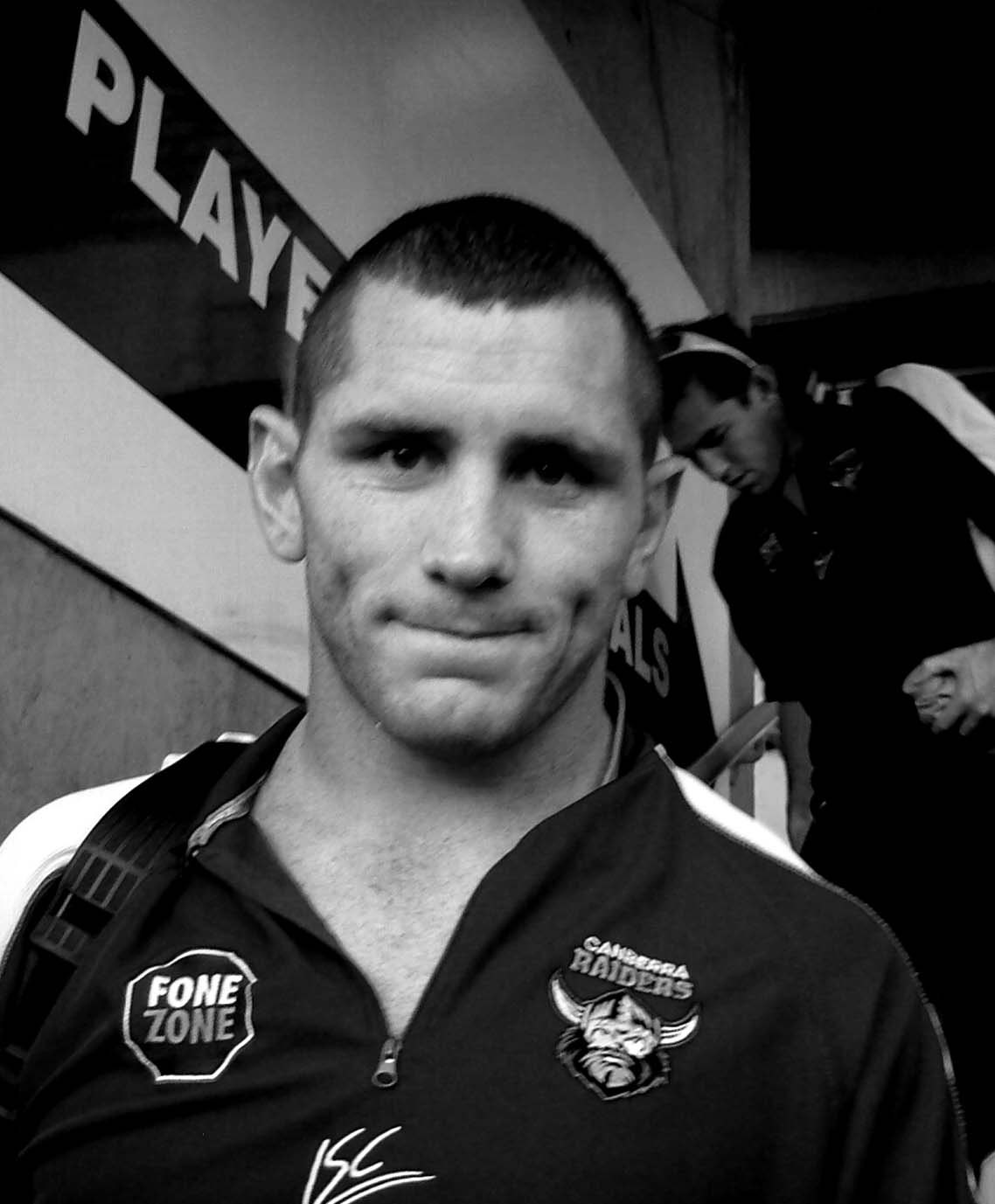

Personal information
- Born: 23 December 1983 (age 41); Forbes, New South Wales, Australia

Playing information
- Height: 180 cm (5 ft 11 in)
- Weight: 100 kg (16 st 10 lb)
- Position: Prop, Lock, Second-row
Club
Years	Team	Pld	T	G	FG	P
2004–11	Canberra Raiders	113	3	0	0	12
2012	St. George Illawarra	9	1	0	0	4
	Total	122	4	0	0	16

Josh Miller (born 23 December 1983) is an Australian former professional rugby league footballer who played in the 2000s and 2010s. He played in the National Rugby League (NRL) for the Canberra Raiders and St. George Illawarra Dragons.

== Playing career ==
Miller began playing with the Canberra Raiders in 2004 and played with that team until the 2011. He operated as a second-row, prop or as a lock. For Canberra he, along with Troy Thompson, won the Raiders' player of the year award in 2005. He won the award again in 2009 alongside Josh Dugan.

On 25 August 2011, it was announced that Miller had signed for the St George Illawarra Dragons on a deal that would last for 2 years.

He announced on 8 November 2012, that he would retire from the NRL and would not participate in the 2013 season for medical reasons as advised by St George Illawarra Dragons medical staff.

== Coaching career ==
On 21 October 2022 it was announced that Miller was returning to the Canberra Raiders as the club's contact coach for the 2023 season, with the aim of improving the defensive technique of the players.
