= Robbie Rochow =

Australian rugby league footballer (born 1990)

Personal information
- Born: 22 August 1990 (age 36) Maitland, New South Wales, Australia

Playing information
- Height: 191 cm (6 ft 3 in)
- Weight: 103 kg (16 st 3 lb)
- Position: Second-row
Club
| Years | Team | Pld | T | G | FG | P |
|---|---|---|---|---|---|---|
| 2010–11 | Melbourne Storm | 2 | 0 | 0 | 0 | 0 |
| 2012–16 | Newcastle Knights | 72 | 7 | 0 | 0 | 28 |
| 2017 | South Sydney | 8 | 0 | 0 | 0 | 0 |
| 2017 | Melbourne Storm | 1 | 0 | 0 | 0 | 0 |
| 2018 | Wests Tigers | 12 | 1 | 0 | 0 | 4 |
| | Total | 95 | 8 | 0 | 0 | 32 |
Representative
| Years | Team | Pld | T | G | FG | P |
| 2014 | NSW Country | 1 | 0 | 0 | 0 | 0 |

Robbie Rochow (born 22 August 1990) is an Australian former professional rugby league footballer who played as a second-row forward in the 2010s.

He previously played for the Melbourne Storm in two spells, the Newcastle Knights, South Sydney Rabbitohs and the Wests Tigers in the NRL. He played for New South Wales Country in 2014.

== Background ==
Born in Maitland, New South Wales, Rochow attended All Saints College, Maitland. He played his junior football for the East Maitland Griffins before graduating to first-grade for the Kurri Kurri Bulldogs. As a 17-year-old, Rochow played SG Ball with the Newcastle Knights before being signed by the Melbourne Storm. Rochow played for Melbourne's NYC team in 2009 and 2010. In 2009, Rochow played in the Toyota Cup Grand Final-winning Melbourne team.

== Playing career ==
=== 2010 ===
In Round 14, Rochow made his NRL debut for the Melbourne club against the Sydney Roosters off the interchange bench in their 38–6 loss at AAMI Park. This was Rochow's only NRL match for the season.

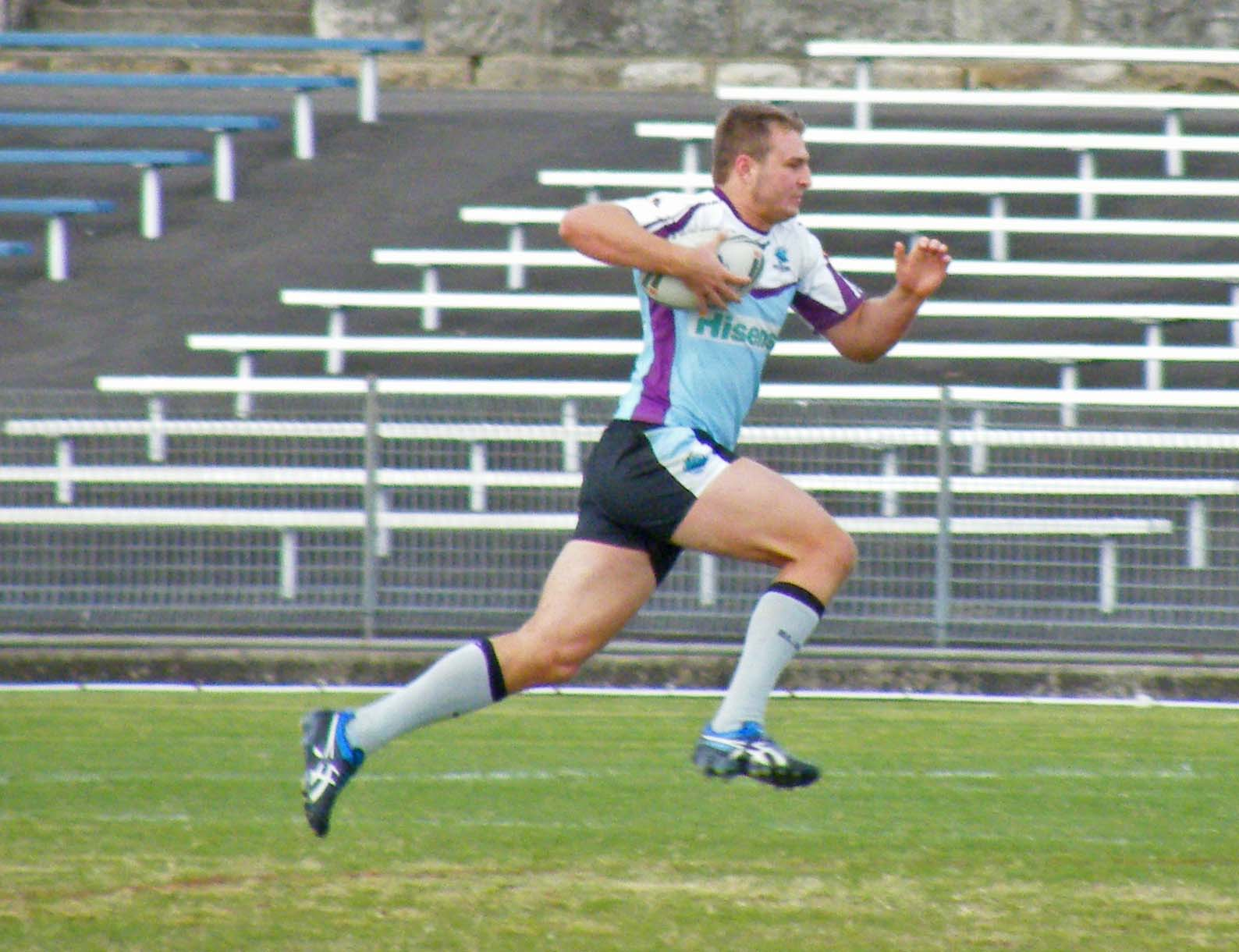
Rochow playing for the Storm-Sharks mixed team in 2011

=== 2011 ===
In July, Rochow signed a one-year contract with the Newcastle Knights, his junior club, to link up with Wayne Bennett. He only played 1 match in 2011.

=== 2012 ===
In May, Rochow re-signed with the Newcastle club on a two-year contract after impressive form in the NSW Cup. In Round 19, Rochow made his club debut for the Newcastle side off the interchange bench after Neville Costigan was ruled out with injury. In Round 21 against the Canberra Raiders, Rochow scored his first NRL try in the club's 36–6 win at Canberra Stadium. Rochow finished his first year with the Newcastle outfit playing in eight matches and scoring one try.

=== 2013 ===
On 22 May, Rochow re-signed with the Newcastle side on a two-year contract. Rochow finished the season with him playing in all 27 matches and scoring two tries.

=== 2014 ===
In February, Rochow was selected in Newcastle's 2014 inaugural Auckland Nines squad. Rochow was selected for the Country Origin squad for the annual City vs Country Origin match. Rochow played off the interchange bench in the 26-26 all draw in Dubbo. He finished the year with him playing in all of Newcastle's 24 matches and scoring three tries.

=== 2015 ===
On 31 January and 1 February, Rochow played for Newcastle in the 2015 NRL Auckland Nines. His 2015 season was interrupted by back and arm injuries, limiting his game time to just five matches and scoring one try as the club finished last.

=== 2016 ===
In February, Rochow co-captained the Newcastle club in the 2016 NRL Auckland Nines.

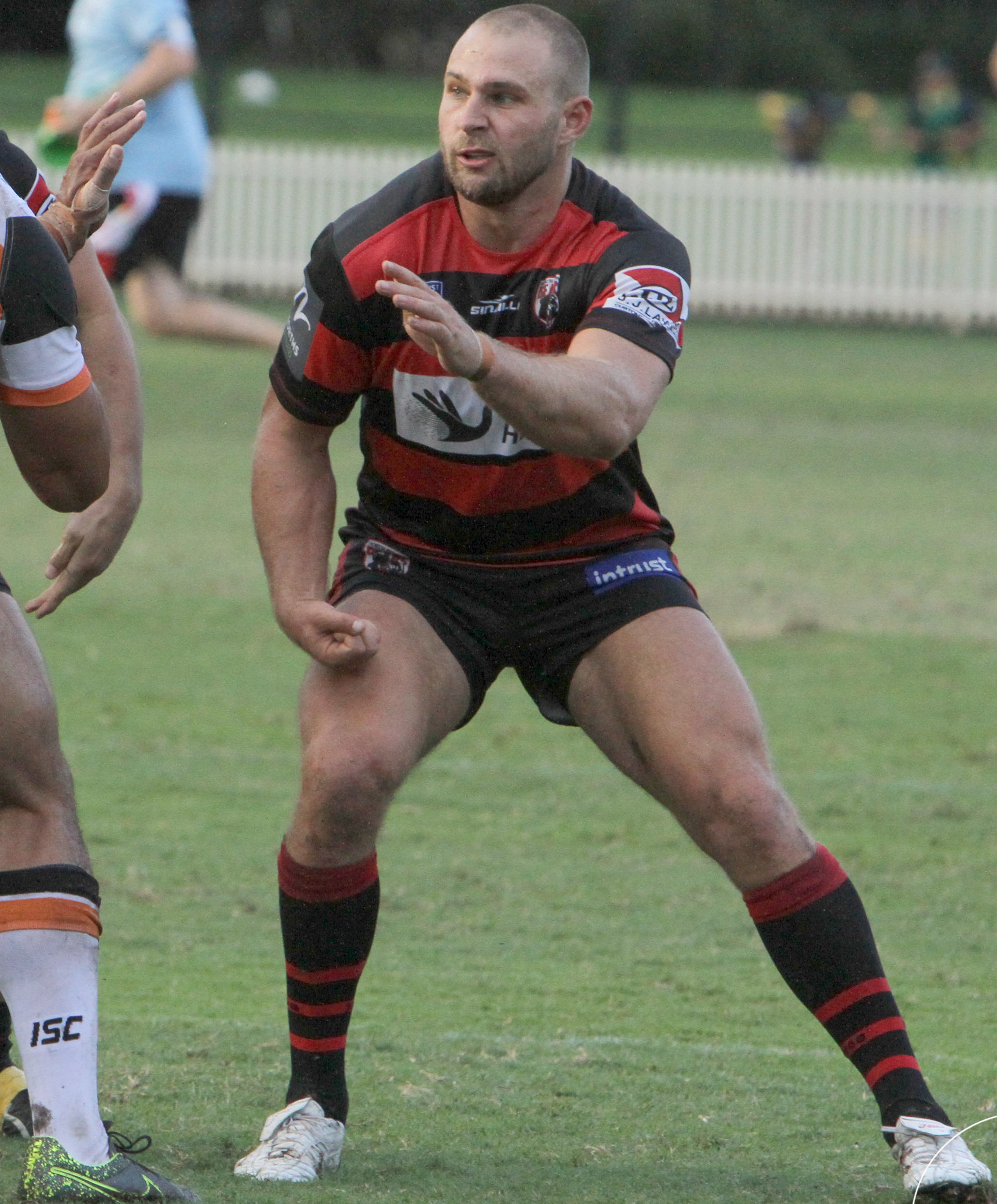
Rochow playing for the North Sydney Bears in 2017

On 26 August 2016, Rochow signed a one-year contract with the South Sydney Rabbitohs starting in 2017. He finished the 2016 season having played in eight matches in his last season for the Newcastle side.

=== 2017 ===
In February 2017, Rochow was named in South Sydney's 2017 NRL Auckland Nines squad. In round 1 of the 2017 NRL season, he made his club debut for South Sydney against the Wests Tigers, playing off the interchange bench in their 18–34 loss at ANZ Stadium. After failing to gain a regular spot in the South Sydney line-up, he played the majority of the first half of the season with North Sydney in the Intrust Super Premiership NSW. He made a total of four appearances for North Sydney.

In July, Rochow rejoined the Melbourne Storm, the club he started his NRL career at, for the remainder of the season, after being released from his South Sydney contract in a player swap with South Sydney for Melbourne forward Dean Britt.

In September, he signed a two-year contract with the Wests Tigers, starting in 2018.

=== 2018 ===
In round 1 of the 2018 NRL season, he made his debut for the Wests Tigers against the Sydney Roosters, playing at second row 10–8 win at ANZ Stadium. In round 4 against the Parramatta Eels, he scored his first try for the West Tigers 30–20 win at ANZ Stadium.

=== 2019 Final season ===
Rochow played a single game for the Wests Tigers in the 2019 NRL season, featuring almost exclusively for their reserve grade feeder club Western Suburbs. At the end of the season Rochow announced his retirement.
