= Gavin Reynolds =

English cricketer

Personal information
- Full name: Gavin Reynolds
- Born: 15 April 1979 (age 47); Liverpool, Lancashire, England
- Batting: Right-handed
- Bowling: Right-arm medium

Domestic team information
- Years: Team
- 2001: Lancashire Cricket Board

Career statistics
Competition	LA
Matches	1
Runs scored	2
Batting average	2.00
100s/50s	–/–
Top score	2
Balls bowled	60
Wickets	1
Bowling average	28.00
5 wickets in innings	–
10 wickets in match	–
Best bowling	1/28
Catches/stumpings	–/–
- Source: Cricinfo, 14 November 2010

Gavin Reynolds (born 15 April 1979) is a former English cricketer. Reynolds was a right-handed batsman who bowled right-arm medium pace. He was born in Liverpool, Lancashire.

Reynolds represented the Lancashire Cricket Board in a single List A match against the Yorkshire Cricket Board in the 2001 Cheltenham & Gloucester Trophy. In his only List A match, he scored 2 runs. With the ball he took a single wicket at a cost of 28 runs.
