= Matt Duffie =

NZ dual-code rugby international player

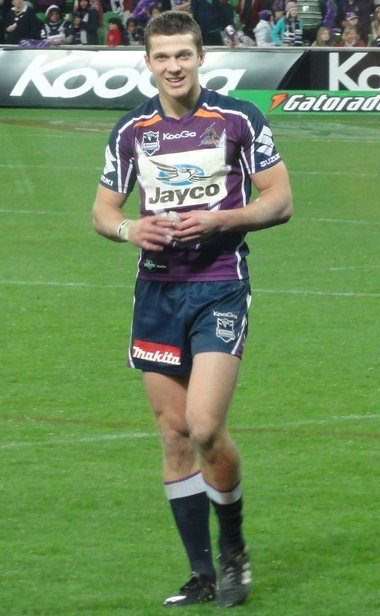
- Duffie post match representing the Melbourne Storm, September 2010

Personal information
- Full name: Matthew David Duffie
- Born: 16 August 1990 (age 36) Christchurch, New Zealand
- Education: St. Kentigern College
- Height: 192 cm (6 ft 4 in)
- Weight: 95 kg (209 lb; 14 st 13 lb)
- Rugby league career

Playing information
- Position: Wing, Fullback
Club
Years	Team	Pld	T	G	FG	P
2010–2015	Melbourne Storm	62	37	1	0	150
Representative
Years	Team	Pld	T	G	FG	P
2011	New Zealand	1	1	0	0	4

Sport

Rugby union career
- Position(s): Fullback, Wing
Senior career
Years	Team	Apps	(Points)
2016–2020	Blues	54	(55)
2016–2019	North Harbour	39	(110)
2021–2022	Honda Heat	18	(26)
- Correct as of 21 February 2022
International career
Years	Team	Apps	(Points)
2017	New Zealand	2	(5)
2019	Barbarian F.C.	1	(0)
- Correct as of 26 July 2020

Matthew David Duffie (born 16 August 1990) is a New Zealand former professional rugby footballer who last played rugby union for the Blues in Super Rugby.

He previously played rugby league with the Melbourne Storm in the National Rugby League (NRL) and was a part of their under-20s Premiership winning team in 2009, scoring 25 tries. On 1 May 2011, he was selected for the New Zealand national rugby league team for the 2011 ANZAC Test. In October 2017, Duffie was named in the All Blacks for their end-of-year tour, becoming a dual-code rugby international.

== Early life ==
Duffie attended Saint Kentigern College in Pakuranga, Auckland, New Zealand, where he was a part of the school's First XV, playing at fullback. He also excelled at athletics, making the national finals of the 200 m, 400 m and high jump. He graduated his final year in 2008.

In his younger years, he played for junior clubs the Kaiapoi Bulldogs and the Pakuranga Jaguars. He is the first Kaiapoi (now Northern) Bulldogs junior to be selected for the New Zealand national rugby league team.

As a 16-year-old Duffie also played senior Australian rules football earning selection in the New Zealand national team, after which he was invited to an Australian Football League training camp.

== Rugby league career ==
Melbourne Storm scout Darren Bell discovered Duffie playing rugby union and offered him a scholarship. He moved to Melbourne at the end of 2008 and developed rapidly in their professional program.

Duffie was a part of the Storm's 2009 NYC Grand Final winning team. He scored a try on the wing in the victory against the Wests Tigers.

Duffie made his first-team debut against Harlequins RL at the Twickenham Stoop in the World City Challenge in 2010.

He scored two tries in his NRL debut in round seven of the 2010 season. and ended the year with a tally of 8 from 14 games played. In the same year, he was named the Melbourne Storm Rookie of the Year.

Duffie played a major part in the Storm's comeback in 2011 scoring 12 tries in his 18 games played. He underwent shoulder reconstruction surgery in October of that year.

In April 2011, Duffie signed a three-year extension to his contract with the Storm, taking him to the end of the 2014 season.

In 2012, he scored 10 tries in the 17 games he played. In the Storm's round 19 match against the North Queensland Cowboys, he suffered another shoulder dislocation injury, to the same shoulder (left) as in 2011. This caused him to miss out on Melbourne's 2012 Grand Final win.

After returning from his shoulder reconstruction, Duffie played the opening four games for the Storm during the 2013 season. He started the year scoring three tries, including a double against the Brisbane Broncos at Suncorp Stadium. Following this, Duffie tore the anterior cruciate ligament in his left knee and re-injured his right shoulder whilst playing for the Cronulla Sharks in round 5 of the New South Wales Cup competition. This injury ended his 2013 season.

Duffie returned to the lineup in 2014 playing in Melbourne's opening trial against the Canberra Raiders. He went to New Zealand and played in the NRL Auckland Nines competition, where he played in all three of the Storm's games. On 19 February, Duffie collided with a teammate during a training session and injured the same knee from 2013, rupturing his left anterior cruciate ligament. This caused him to miss the entire 2014 season. In late September 2014, he signed a one-year extension contract to the Storm, seeing him through to the end of 2015.

== Rugby union career ==
Duffie has signed to play rugby union for the Blues and North Harbour in 2016. Duffie had become a regular starter for those teams by the end of 2016 after consistently performing for a high level. Duffie cemented his spot as a regular starter for the Blues in 2017, starting for the Blues against the touring British and Irish Lions side in the Blues' historic 22–16 victory over them. Duffie was subbed off in the 65th minute after colliding with the Lions' replacement back Liam Williams twice during the match. Williams was yellow-carded in the 56th minute for his second collision with Duffie.

Following All Blacks vice-captain Ben Smith taking a sabbatical and season-ending injuries to All Black wingers Israel Dagg and Nehe Milner-Skudder and fullback Jordie Barrett, Duffie was called up to the All Blacks as an injury replacement and was named in the 37-man squad for the 2017 end-of-year tour.

Duffie made his debut for New Zealand in the 31–22 win over the Barbarians on 4 November 2017, as a replacement off the bench for in-form winger Waisake Naholo in the 67th minute. Duffie made his first international start ten days later against a French XV, scoring his first international try in the 23rd minute. Duffie played the full match and the All Blacks went on to win 28–23, however this match does not count as an official test match.

== Post Sports Career ==
In May 2022, Duffie was signed by his former club Melbourne Storm as Pathways Coach. On 7 January 2024, Duffie was named as the Melbourne Storm SG Ball head coach.
