= Troy Thompson (rugby league) =

Australian rugby league footballer

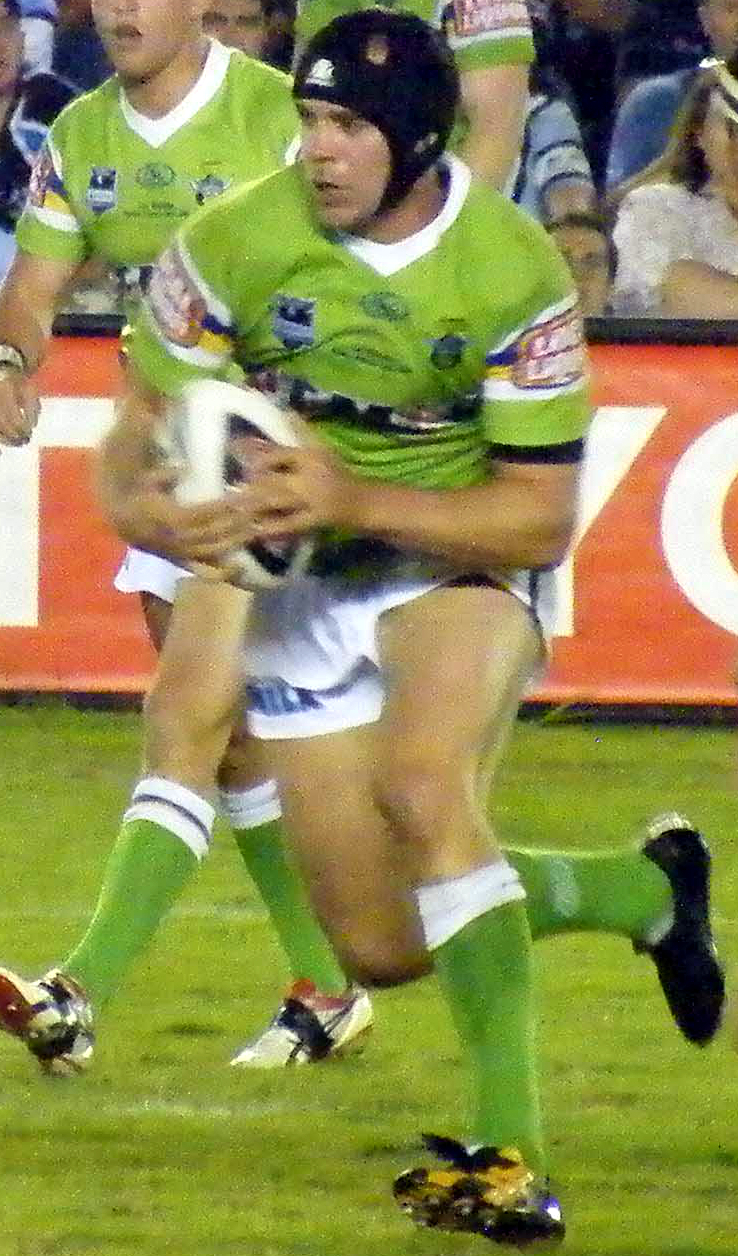

Personal information
- Full name: Troy Thompson
- Born: 6 November 1979 (age 47) Canberra, ACT, Australia

Playing information
- Height: 189 cm (6 ft 2 in)
- Weight: 105 kg (16 st 7 lb)
- Position: Prop, Second-row
Club
Years	Team	Pld	T	G	FG	P
2000–01	Villefranche XIII
2001–10	Canberra Raiders	156	6	0	0	24
2011	Melbourne Storm	7	0	0	0	0
	Total	163	6	0	0	24

Troy Thompson is an Australian former professional rugby league footballer who last played as a prop or as a second rower for the Melbourne Storm in the NRL. He previously played for the Canberra Raiders.

== Early life ==
Born in Canberra, Australia. Thompson was educated at Dickson College, Canberra, where he represented 1997 Australian Schoolboys.

Thompson played his junior football with West Belconnen Warriors.

== Playing career ==
Thompson made his first-grade debut playing for Canberra Raiders against the Broncos in round 21 of the 2001 season.

In 2005 he, along with Josh Miller, won the Raiders' Player of the Year award, becoming the first joint-winners in the club's history.

Thompson was told he would not be offered another contract when his current one expired at the end of the 2010 season. This caused Thompson to publicly attack the Raiders for not offering him a further deal, to which he felt he was entitled due to playing for the club for so long.

This was due to Canberra having signed Brett White, a more experienced representative player who played in the same position as Thompson at a higher level for similar amounts of money.

Thompson then went on to play with Melbourne Storm after signing with them for the 2011 season. Thompson made 7 appearances for the club and his last game in first grade was a 40–8 loss against the Sydney Roosters.
