= Grant Jones (rugby league) =

Australian rugby league player

Grant Jones (born 27 June 1958) is an Australian former rugby league footballer. He played five seasons in the New South Wales Rugby League Premiership, four of which for South Sydney.

== Playing career ==
Jones started his career in round 12 of the 1977 NSWRL season. He scored on debut, though his team lost 13-17 to Balmain. In round 20, he scored a try in a 20-36 loss to North Sydney. Two rounds later, he scored in a loss to Newtown. Souths played poorly that year, going on to win just 3 of their 22 games in 1977.

Jones did not play in the 1978 season. Despite not consistently getting field time, Jones was assigned the team's kicking duties in 1979. He scored a goal off the interchange in a round 13 loss to Eastern Suburbs, marking his first career goal. The following game he kicked 7 goals from 8 attempts and slotted a field goal to help his side win 30-12 over Manly. In round 22, Jones scored a try and three goals in a win against Balmain. Souths improved as a team, but failed to reach the finals.

Jones had a short, but successful 1980 season. In the opening game of the season, he scored a try in a win against St. George. The following game he kicked a try, 6 goals and a field goal in a 28-2 win over Balmain. In round 5, Jones scored a try and a goal in a loss to Newtown.

In 1981, Jones made just one appearance. He played in a 11-37 loss to Canterbury in what would be his final game with South Sydney.

Jones signed with Easts for the 1982 season. He only played one game with them in a 30-point win over Canberra. He retired from the game having scored 7 tries, 8 goals and 2 field goals (59 points) in 17 appearances.
