= Jack Afamasaga =

Samoa international rugby league footballer

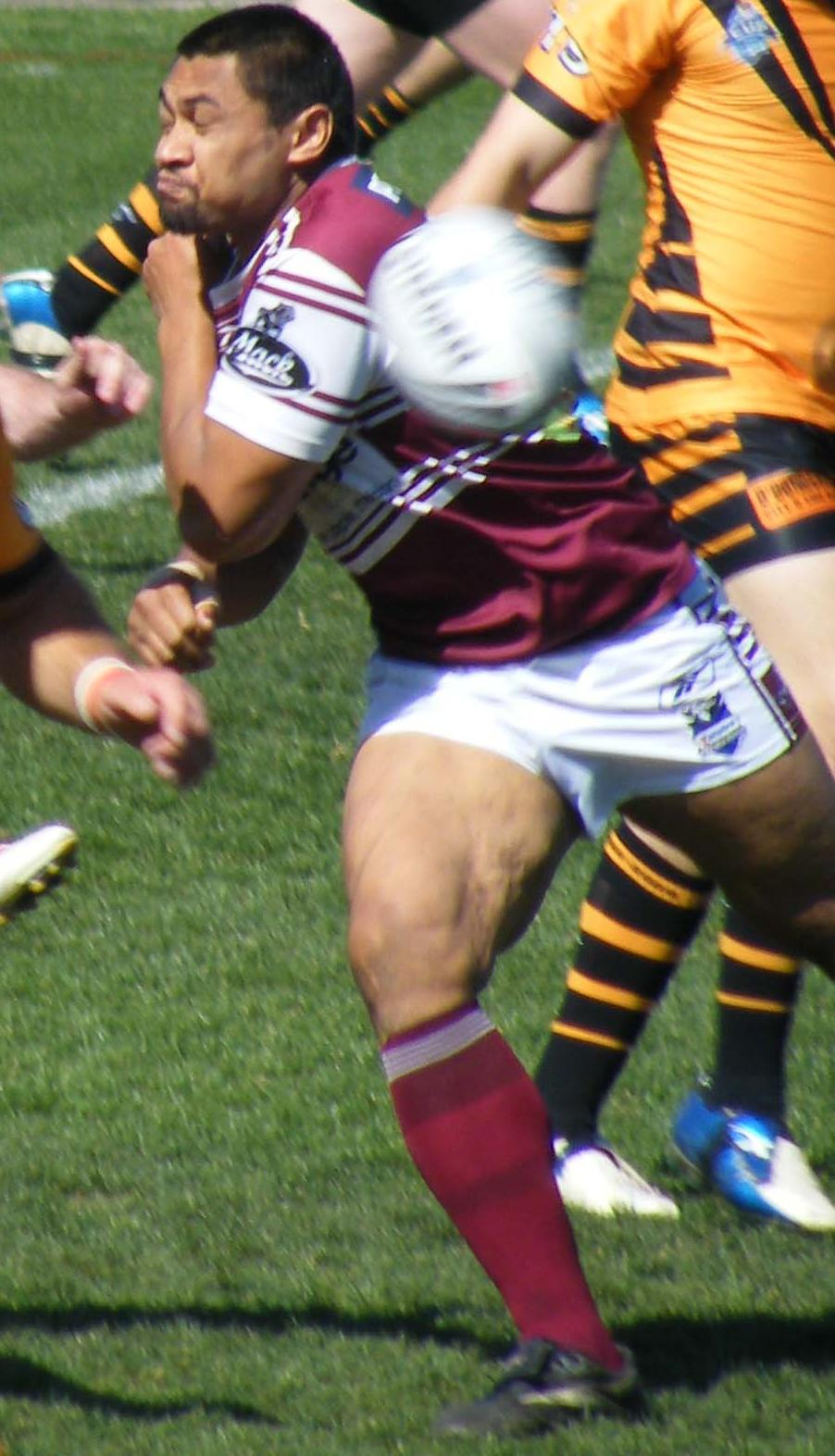

Personal information
- Full name: Jack Taualii Afamasaga
- Born: 2 June 1984 (age 42) Lower Hutt, New Zealand

Playing information
- Height: 184 cm (6 ft 0 in)
- Weight: 106 kg (16 st 10 lb)
- Position: Second-row, Lock
Club
| Years | Team | Pld | T | G | FG | P |
|---|---|---|---|---|---|---|
| 2004–06 | Parramatta Eels | 11 | 0 | 0 | 0 | 0 |
| 2007–08 | Manly Sea Eagles | 14 | 1 | 0 | 0 | 4 |
| 2009 | Cronulla Sharks | 10 | 0 | 0 | 0 | 0 |
| 2010 | RC Lescure-Arthes XIII | 1 | 0 | 0 | 0 | 0 |
| 2011 | Melbourne Storm | 1 | 0 | 0 | 0 | 0 |
| | Total | 37 | 1 | 0 | 0 | 4 |
Representative
| Years | Team | Pld | T | G | FG | P |
| 2009 | Samoa | 1 | 0 | 0 | 0 | 0 |
| 2010 | Queensland Residents | 1 | 0 | 0 | 0 | 0 |

Jack Taualii Afamasaga (born 2 June 1984), also known by the nickname of "Skuks", is a New Zealand former rugby union and professional rugby league footballer who played in the 2000s and 2010s. He played at club level for the Parramatta Eels, the Manly-Warringah Sea Eagles, the Cronulla-Sutherland Sharks, the Melbourne Storm in the National Rugby League, the Western Suburbs Rosellas in the Newcastle Rugby League competition, with stints in the Queensland Cup and France, as a second-row or lock.

== Background ==
Afamasaga was born in Lower Hutt, New Zealand, and is of Samoan heritage.

Afamasaga is a cousin of Hurricanes and All Blacks player Ma'a Nonu. He is eligible to represent Samoa.

== Childhood and early career ==
Afamasaga originally began playing rugby union in his youth, playing for the 1st XV team at Waiopehu College in Levin (the same high school attended by former All Black Carlos Spencer) and working his way up through several representative teams before he was eventually selected by the Wellington Hurricanes in their schoolboy team.

In 2002, at age 18, and after several seasons in the Hurricanes' youth system playing in the centres Afamasaga was spotted by Parramatta Eels rugby league scout Mark Horo and was signed to the Australian club on a development deal.

== Parramatta Eels ==
He began playing in the junior grades at the Parramatta club during the 2003 season, impressing with his skill, power, and pace. Afamasago made his first grade debut during the 2004 season against the Wests Tigers at Leichhardt Oval. He then went on to play five games for the club and showed glimpses of the great potential he possessed eventually going on to win the Eric Grothe Rookie of the Year award.

During the next two seasons with the club, Afamasaga played another six games but could not hold down a permanent first-grade position.

== Manly-Warringah Sea Eagles ==
Afamasaga was offered a new deal at Parramatta at the completion of the 2006 NRL season but signed for the Manly-Warringah Sea Eagles instead, deciding to chase a regular first grade spot. He appeared in the 2007 Grand Final, which Manly lost to Melbourne.

However, after failing to crack a regular first-grade spot in 2008 (only playing 2 matches) he has now been released by Manly.

== Cronulla-Sutherland Sharks ==
In the 2009 NRL season, Afamasaga played ten matches for Cronulla as the club missed the finals.

== Melbourne Storm ==
Afamasaga was signed to a trial deal with the Melbourne Storm for the rest of the 2011 season. Signed before the 30 June deadline, Afamasaga was free to play with the Victorian side and their feeder team on the Cronulla-Sutherland Sharks. He had recently been playing in France for RC Lescure-Arthes XIII, and played in the Queensland Cup for the Wynnum Manly Seagulls in 2010.

== Newcastle Rugby League ==
After his stint with Storm, Afamasaga moved to Newcastle, New South Wales to play with the Western Suburbs Rosellas for the 2012 season.

== Representative career ==
In 2009 he was named as part of the Samoan squad for the 2009 Pacific Cup.
