= Billy Rogers (rugby league) =

Australian rugby league footballer

Billy (Bootstrap) Rogers
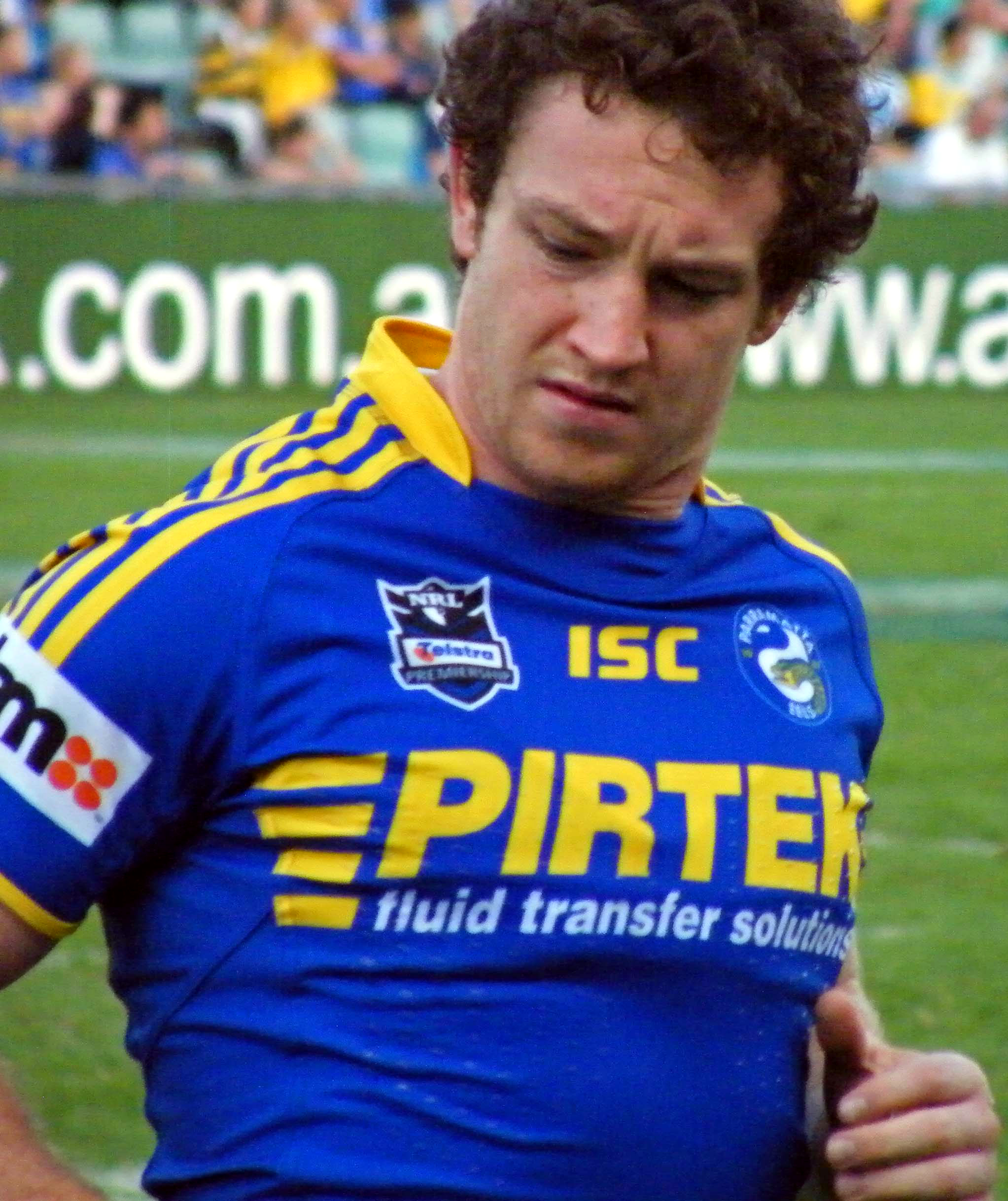

Personal information
- Full name: Billy Bert Rogers
- Born: 29 March 1989 (age 35); Charleville, Queensland, Australia
- Height: 185 cm (6 ft 1 in)
- Weight: 97 kg (15 st 4 lb)

Playing information
- Position: Lock, Second-row
Club
Years	Team	Pld	T	G	FG	P
2011	Parramatta Eels	5	0	0	0	0

Billy Rogers (born 29 March 1989) is an Australian professional rugby league footballer who has played as a lock.

== Playing career ==
As a youngster Rogers played junior rugby league for Gympie Devils. Rogers then a teenager signed with the Melbourne Storm in 2007, playing in the NYC until 2009, winning a NYC title in 2009 as captain of the Storm.

In 2011, Rogers signed a two-year deal with the Parramatta Eels. He made his NRL debut in round 3 of the 2011 NRL season, against the South Sydney Rabbitohs. He soon was released from his contract, leaving for personal reasons.

After leaving Parramatta, Rogers signed with the Gympie Devils, winning two premierships with them. Rogers later played in the United States with the Jacksonville Axemen. In 2015, Rogers played for the Northern Outlaws who compete in the Sunshine Coast Gympie Rugby League competition. On 27 January 2017, it was announced that Rogers had signed with the Underbank Rangers who play in the English Pennine League.
