= List of current NRL team squads =

Below is a list of current 2026 NRL team squads that compete in the National Rugby League of Australia and New Zealand.

== Brisbane Broncos ==
Brisbane Broncos 2026 Squad
Top 30 squad - 2026 NRL season			Supplementary list	Coaching staff
Grant Anderson – WG; Jesse Arthars – WG, FB; Patrick Carrigan – LK; Phillip Coates – WG; Tom Duffy – HB; Jack Gosiewski – SR; Payne Haas – PR; Delouise Hoeter – CE; Ben Hunt – HK, FE, HB; Jaiyden Hunt – SR, PR	Corey Jensen – PR; Josiah Karapani – WG; Ezra Mam – FE; Deine Mariner – WG, CE; Blake Mozer – HK; Cory Paix – HK; Hayze Perham – FB; Brendan Piakura – SR; Adam Reynolds (c) – HB; Jordan Riki – SR	Josh Rogers – HK; Gehamat Shibasaki – CE; Kotoni Staggs – CE; Ben Talty – PR; Aublix Tawha – PR; Ben Te Kura – PR; Antonio Verhoeven – WG; Reece Walsh – FB; Billy Walters – HK; Xavier Willison – PR, SR, LK	Cameron Bukowski – HK; Tupou Francis – LK; Jared Horne – LK; Braithen Scott – HB; Va'a Semu – PR; Extended squad: Luke Gale – SR; Preston Riki – PR	Head coach: Michael Maguire; Assistant coaches: Matt Ballin; Trent Barrett; Adam Brideson (Development & Transition); Legend: (c) Captain(s); (vc) Vice-captain(s); Updated: 30 April 2026; Source(s): Broncos Team Profiles

== Canberra Raiders ==
Canberra Raiders 2026 squad
Top 30 squad - 2026 NRL season			Supplementary list	Coaching staff
Michael Asomua – WG; Coby Black – HB; Jayden Brailey – HK; Jake Clydsdale – PR; Sione Finau – WG; Corey Horsburgh – LK; Zac Hosking – SR, LK; Sebastian Kris – CE; Daine Laurie – FB, FE; Ata Mariota – PR, SR	Myles Martin – LK; Noah Martin – SR; Matty Nicholson – SR; Josh Papali'i – PR; Owen Pattie – HK; Vena Patuki-Case – PR; Joe Roddy – LK; Ethan Sanders – HB; Simi Sasagi – CE; Xavier Savage – WG	Morgan Smithies – LK; Tom Starling – HK; Chevy Stewart – FB; Ethan Strange – FE; Jed Stuart – WG; Savelio Tamale – WG; Joseph Tapine (c) – PR; Matthew Timoko – CE; Kaeo Weekes – FB; Hudson Young – SR	Ethan Alaia – FE; Shaun Packer – HK; Mark Tuialii – CE; Jayze Tuigamala – LK; Extended squad: Jordan Uta – SR	Head coach: Ricky Stuart; Assistant coaches: Justin Giteau; Brock Shepperd; Eric Smith (Defence); Chris Lewis (NSW Cup Coach); Ash Barnes (Jersey Flegg Coach); Jeremy Braun (Elite Pathways Coach); Josh Miller (Contact Coach); Jarrod Croker (Outside Backs & Goal Kicking Coach); Medical professionals: Greg MacLeod (Club Doctor); Travis Ronaldson (NRL Strength & Power Coach/Club Dietitian); Leigh Woodbridge (NRL Rehabilitation Coach); Tom Christian (NRL Sports Scientist); Konrad Schultz (Head Physiotherapist); Isaac Priddis (Physiotherapist); Managers: Chris Hitchison (NRL Recruitment Manager); David Warwick (Senior Recruitment Officer); Josh Strahorn (NRL High Performance Manager); Tim Wykes (Pathways & Performance); Legend: (c) Captain(s); (vc) Vice-captain(s); Updated: 30 April 2026; Source(s): Raiders 2025 Squad Tracker

== Canterbury-Bankstown Bulldogs ==
Canterbury Bulldogs 2026 squad
Top 30 squad - 2026 NRL season			Supplementary list	Coaching staff
Matt Burton – FE; Stephen Crichton (c) – CE; Joshua Curran – PR, SR; Kade Dykes – FB, FE; Lachlan Galvin – HB; Harry Hayes – PR; Bailey Hayward – HK; Lipoi Hopoi – LK; Sam Hughes – PR; Viliame Kikau (vc) – SR	Max King – PR; Jacob Kiraz – WG, FB, CE; Finau Latu – LK; Zyon Maiu'u – PR; Kurt Mann – LK; Marcelo Montoya – WG; Sean O'Sullivan – HB, FE; Jacob Preston – SR; Jaeman Salmon – LK; Jonathan Sua – WG	Daniel Suluka-Fifita – PR; Leo Thompson – PR; Jack Todd – LK, PR; Connor Tracey – FB; Enari Tuala – WG; Sitili Tupouniua – PR, SR; Jake Turpin – HK; Mitchell Woods – HB; Bronson Xerri – CE; Patrick Young – HK	Sosaia Alatini – CE; Fletcher Baker – PR; Alekolasimi Jones – SR; Gordon Chan Kum Tong – HK; Logan Spinks – SR; Jack Underhill – PR; Extended squad: Alex Conti – HB; Jethro Rinakama – WG	Manager: Phil Gould (General Manager of Football); Head coach: Cameron Ciraldo; Assistant coaches: Adam O'Brien; Chad Randall; Luke Vella; Jason Taylor (NSW Cup Coach); Mick Potter (Academy Coach); Josh Jackson (Jersey Flegg Coach); Trent Elkin (Athletic Performance & Rehabilitation Lead); Michael Kulen (Head Football Analyst); Travis Touma (High Performance Manager); Managers: Adam Hartigan (Chief of Staff); Legend: (c) Captain(s); (vc) Vice-captain(s); Updated: 30 April 2026; Source(s): Bulldogs 2025

== Cronulla-Sutherland Sharks ==
Cronulla Sharks 2026 squad
Top 30 squad - 2026 NRL season			Supplementary list	Coaching staff
Jayden Berrell – HK; Blayke Brailey (c) – HK; Billy Burns – SR; Jesse Colquhoun – LK; Addin Fonua-Blake – PR; Michael Gabrael – CE; Tuku Hau Tapuha – PR; Thomas Hazelton – PR; Blake Hosking – LK, SR; Nicho Hynes (vc) – HB	KL Iro – CE; Liam Ison – FB; Riley Jones – HK, FB; Sione Katoa – WG; Oregon Kaufusi – PR; William Kennedy – FB; Cameron McInnes (c) – LK; Ronaldo Mulitalo – WG; Briton Nikora – SR; Hohepa Puru – LK	Niwhai Puru – HB; Jesse Ramien – CE; Toby Rudolf – PR; Samuel Stonestreet – WG; Siosifa Talakai – SR, CE; Braydon Trindall – FE; Braden Uele – PR; Chris Vea'ila – CE; Teig Wilton – SR	Prestyn Laine-Sietu – CE; Riley Pollard – FE, HB	Head coach: Craig Fitzgibbon; Assistant coaches: Daniel Holdsworth; Frédéric Michalak; Steve Price; Matt Shirvington (Speed Coach); Tony Grimaldi (Strength & Conditioning Coach); Legend: (c) Captain(s); (vc) Vice-captain(s); Updated: 30 April 2026; Source(s): Sharks Team Profiles

== Dolphins ==
Dolphins 2026 squad
Top 30 squad – 2026 NRL season			Supplementary list	Coaching staff
Jake Averillo – CE, FB; Jack Bostock – WG; Selwyn Cobbo – CE; Kurt Donoghoe – HK; Herbie Farnworth – CE; Kulikefu Finefeuiaki – SR; Thomas Flegler – PR; Trai Fuller – FB; Tom Gilbert (c) – PR; Jamayne Isaako – WG	Isaiya Katoa – HB; Felise Kaufusi (vc) – PR, LK; Oryn Keeley – SR; Morgan Knowles – LK; Connelly Lemuelu – SR; Jeremy Marshall-King – HK; Francis Molo – PR; Tevita Naufahu – WG; Kodi Nikorima – FE; LJ Nonu – WG	Max Plath – SR, LK, HK; Brian Pouniu – CE; Elijah Rasmussen – PR; Daniel Saifiti – PR; Brad Schneider – FE; Ray Stone – LK; Sebastian Su'a – PR; Hamiso Tabuai-Fidow – FB	Charlie Dickson – LK; John Fineanganofo – HK; Zac Garton – SR; Patrick Kailahi – SR; Lewis Symonds – LK; Tyreece Tait – WG	Head coach: Kristian Woolf; Assistant coaches: Nathan Fien; Rory Kostjasyn; Ben Woolf; Jeremy Hickmans (Head of Performance); Blake Duncan (Athletic Performance Coach); Elliot Jackson (Athletic Performance Coach); Medical professionals: Adam Schumacher (Physiotherapist); John Davey (Head of Sports Science & Performance Analysis); Legend: (c) Captain(s); (vc) Vice-captain(s); Development players; Extended squad; Updated: 30 April 2026; Source(s):

== Gold Coast Titans ==
Gold Coast Titans 2026 squad
Top 30 squad - 2026 NRL season			Supplementary list	Coaching staff
Cooper Bai – LK; AJ Brimson (vc) – FE, CE; Jayden Campbell – HB; Adam Christensen – SR; Jaylan De Groot – FB; Tino Fa'asuamaleaui (c) – PR; Siale Faeamani – WG; Max Feagai – CE; Beau Fermor – SR; Jojo Fifita – CE	Allan Fitzgibbon – WG; Moeaki Fotuaika – PR; Tony Francis – WG; Brock Gray – PR; Klese Haas – PR; Zane Harrison – HB; Arama Hau – SR; Lachlan Ilias – FE, HB; Jaimin Jolliffe – PR, LK; Keano Kini – FB	Jett Liu – PR; Kurtis Morrin – PR; Josh Patston – SR; Chris Randall – LK; Phillip Sami – WG; Tukimihia Simpkins – PR; Luke Sommerton – HK; Jensen Taumoepeau – WG; Sam Verrills – HK	Jai Bilish – HK; Dean Ieremia – WG; Sunny Kama – CE; Oliver Pascoe – HK	Head coach: Josh Hannay; Assistant coaches: Brian McDermott; Brad Davis; Steve Murphy; Legend: (c) Captain(s); (vc) Vice-captain(s); Updated: 30 April 2026; Source(s): Titans Team Profiles

== Manly Warringah Sea Eagles ==
Manly Warringah Sea Eagles 2026 squad
Top 30 squad - 2026 NRL season			Supplementary list	Coaching staff
Luke Brooks – FE; Nathan Brown – PR; Paul Bryan – PR; Ethan Bullemor – PR; Zach Dockar-Clay – HB; Clayton Faulalo – WG, CE; Jamal Fogarty – HB (gk); Reuben Garrick – CE, WG (gk); Kobe Hetherington – LK; Lehi Hopoate – WG, FB	Tolutau Koula – CE, FB; Simione Laiafi – PR; Onitoni Large – FE; Zaidas Muagututia – HK; Caleb Navale – LK; Haumole Olakau'atu (vc) – SR; Taniela Paseka – PR; Jason Saab – WG; Aaron Schoupp – CE, SR; Jake Simpkin – HK	Ben Trbojevic – SR; Jake Trbojevic (vc) – LK, PR; Tom Trbojevic (c) – FB, CE; Corey Waddell – SR; Joey Walsh – HB; Navren Willett – WG; Blake Wilson – WG	Josh Feledy – CE; Mia Pua'avase – LK; Jackson Shereb – SR; Brandon Wakeham – HK	Manager: Peter Gentle (Head of Football & Recruitment); Head coach: Kieran Foran (Interim); Assistant coaches: Jim Dymock (Defence Coach); Brett Kimmorley (NSW Cup Coach); Jarrod Croker (Goal Kicking Coach); Jon Clarke (Head of Performance); Aaron Greaves (Coaching Development & Leadership Manager); Paul Devlin (High Performance Consultant); Albert Chang (Strength & Power Coach); Legend: (c) Captain(s); (vc) Vice-captain(s); Updated: 30 April 2026; Source(s): Sea Eagles Team Profiles, Sea Eagles 2024

== Melbourne Storm ==
Melbourne Storm 2026 squad
Top 30 squad - 2026 NRL season			Supplementary list	Coaching staff
Shawn Blore – SR; Joe Chan – SR; Cooper Clarke – SR; Xavier Coates – WG; Sua Fa'alogo – FB; Harry Grant (c) – HK; Jack Hetherington – PR; Jack Howarth – CE; Jahrome Hughes (vc) – HB; Tui Kamikamica – PR	Eliesa Katoa – SR; Josh King – PR; Moses Leo – CE; Ativalu Lisati – SR; Trent Loiero – LK; Alec MacDonald – LK; Nick Meaney – WG, CE; Davvy Moale – PR; Cameron Munster (vc) – FE; Josiah Pahulu – PR	Gabriel Satrick – HK; Marion Seve – CE; Trent Toelau – HB; Siulagi Tuimalatu-Brown – WG; Stefano Utoikamanu – PR; Lazarus Vaalepu – PR; Manaia Waitere – CE; Will Warbrick – WG; Tyran Wishart – FE, HB, HK	Jai Bowden – HK; Preston Conn – SR; Stanley Huen – FE; Extended squad: Jak Goulding – PR; Angus Hinchey – LK; Mitchell Jennings – CE; Amare Milford – SR; Jerry Musu – PR; Hugo Peel – WG; Suli Pole – PR; Keagan Russell-Smith – FE	Manager: Frank Ponissi (General Manager of Football); Head coach: Craig Bellamy; Assistant coaches: Marc Brentnall; Aaron Bellamy; Ryan Hinchcliffe; Todd Lowrie (Development Coach); Matt Duffie (Pathways Coach); John Donehue (Contact Coach); Billy Slater (Specialist Coach); Medical professionals: Dr. Jason Chan (Chief Medical Officer); Liam Robinson (Head Physiotherapist); Managers: Paul Bunn (General Manager - Recruitment & List Management); Tim Glasby (Pathways Manager); Lachlan Penfold (Performance); Legend: (c) Captain(s); (vc) Vice-captain(s); Updated: 30 April 2026; Source(s): Storm Team Profiles; Storm staff

== Newcastle Knights ==
Newcastle Knights 2026 squad
Top 30 squad - 2026 NRL season			Development list	Coaching staff
Matt Arthur – HK; Bradman Best – CE; Dylan Brown – HB; Tom Cant – SR; Mat Croker – LK; Phoenix Crossland – HK; Lachlan Crouch – PR; Wilson De Courcey – CE; Tyson Frizell – LK; Dane Gagai – CE	Tyson Gamble – FE; Peter Hola – PR; Cody Hopwood – PR; Brodie Jones – PR; Asu Kepaoa – SR; Dylan Lucas – SR; Francis Manuleleua – SR; Greg Marzhew – WG; Jermaine McEwen – SR; Trey Mooney – PR	Kalyn Ponga (c) – FB; Jacob Saifiti – PR; Elijah Salesa-Leaumoana – LK; Pasami Saulo – PR; James Schiller – WG; Fletcher Sharpe – FE, FB; Sandon Smith – HB, FE; Wil Sullivan – PR; Dominic Young – WG	Harrison Graham – HK; Fletcher Hunt – FB, CE; Matthew Hunter – HB; Kyle McCarthy – CE; Connor Votano – FB	Head coach: Justin Holbrook; Assistant coaches: Brett White - Defence; Steven Hales - Attack; Danny Buderus; Matt Lantry - Pathways; Michael Dobson - NSW Cup Coach; Alex Moore - Jersey Flegg coach; Will Markwick - NRL Head of Performance; Chris James - Director of Football; Legend: (c) Captain(s); (vc) Vice-captain(s); Updated: 30 April 2026; Source(s): Newcastle Knights Profiles, Rugby League Project

== New Zealand Warriors ==
New Zealand Warriors 2026 squad
Top 30 squad - 2026 NRL season			Supplementary list	Coaching staff
Mitchell Barnett (c) – PR, LK; Rocco Berry – CE; Tanah Boyd – HB; Kurt Capewell – SR, CE; Erin Clark – LK; Wayde Egan (vc) – HK; Kayliss Fatialofa – SR; James Fisher-Harris (c) – PR; Jackson Ford – PR; Morgan Gannon – SR	Leka Halasima – SR; Chanel Harris-Tavita – FE; Sam Healey – HK; Eddie Ieremia-Toeava – SR; Alofiana Khan-Pereira – WG; Jacob Laban – SR; Ali Leiataua – CE; Jye Linnane – FE; Te Maire Martin – FE; Haizyn Mellars – WG	Luke Metcalf – HB; Charnze Nicoll-Klokstad – FB; Marata Niukore – SR; Adam Pompey – CE, WG; Tanner Stowers-Smith – PR; Taine Tuaupiki – WG, FB; Roger Tuivasa-Sheck – WG; Demitric Vaimauga – PR; Dallin Watene-Zelezniak – WG	Jett Cleary – HB; Luke Hanson – FE; Motu Pasikala – FB, WG; Caelys-Paul Putoko – CE; Jason Salalilo – PR; Makaia Tafua – HK	Head coach: Andrew Webster; Assistant coaches: Richard Agar (Backs); Stacey Jones (Halves & Special Plays); Slade Griffin (Forwards); Balin Cupples (High Performance); Kai Kara-France (Wrestling); Daryl Halligan (Goalkicking); David Tangata-Toa (NSW Cup coach); Legend: (c) Captain(s); (vc) Vice-captain(s); Updated: 30 April 2026; Source(s): Warriors Football Department

== North Queensland Cowboys ==
North Queensland Cowboys 2026 squad
Top 30 squad – 2026 NRL season			Development list	Coaching staff
John Bateman – SR; Braidon Burns – WG; Tom Chester – CE; Jake Clifford – FE; Reuben Cotter (c) – LK; Tom Dearden (c) – HB; Robert Derby – WG; Scott Drinkwater – FB; Harrison Edwards – PR; Zac Herdegen – HB, HK	Coen Hess – PR; Mason Kira – SR; Kaiden Lahrs – PR; Zac Laybutt – CE; Matthew Lodge – PR; Soni Luke – HK; Heilum Luki – SR; Reed Mahoney – HK; Sam McIntyre – SR; Thomas Mikaele – PR	Jeremiah Nanai – SR; Griffin Neame – PR; Kai O'Donnell – SR; Jaxson Paulo – WG; Jaxon Purdue – CE; Murray Taulagi – WG; Jason Taumalolo – PR; Viliami Vailea – CE; James Walsh – CE, SR	Mason Barber – FB; Xavier Kerrisk – HK; Ethan King – FB, CE; Ronald Philitoga – WG; Liam Sutton – CE; Matthew Watts – PR	Head coach: Todd Payten; Assistant coaches: Paul Wellens; Blake Green; Brett O'Farrell; Legend: (c) Captain(s); (vc) Vice-captain(s); Supplementary list; Extended squad; Train and trial; Updated: 30 April 2026; Source(s): NQ Cowboys

== Parramatta Eels ==
Parramatta Eels – 2026 NRL season squad
Top 30 squad			Supplementary list	Coaching staff
Josh Addo-Carr – WG; Tallyn Da Silva – HK; Jack de Belin – LK; Matt Doorey – LK, PR; Charlie Guymer – SR; J'maine Hopgood – PR, LK; Isaiah Iongi – FB; Kitione Kautoga – SR; Brian Kelly – CE, WG; Toni Mataele – SR	Ryan Matterson – SR; Luca Moretti – PR; Mitchell Moses (c) – HB; Joash Papalii – FB; Junior Paulo – PR; Richard Penisini – CE, WG; Will Penisini – CE; Jonah Pezet – FE, HB; Sean Russell – CE; Jordan Samrani – WG, CE	Bailey Simonsson – WG; Ryley Smith – HK; Jake Tago – WG; Kelma Tuilagi – SR; Sam Tuivaiti – PR; Ronald Volkman – FE; Dylan Walker – LK; Jack Williams – PR, SR	Teancum Brown – PR; Jezaiah Funa-Iuta – SR; William Latu – SR; Lorenzo Talataina – FE; Extended squad: Araz Nanva – WG, CE; Saxon Pryke – PR; Apa Twidle – HB	General Manager of Football: Mark O’Neill; Head coach: Jason Ryles; Assistant coaches: Nathan Brown; Sam Moa; Scott Wisemantel; Legend: (c) Captain(s); (vc) Vice-captain(s); Updated: 30 April 2026; Source(s): Parramatta Eels

== Penrith Panthers ==
Penrith Panthers 2026 squad
Top 30 squad - 2026 NRL season			Coaching staff
Paul Alamoti – WG; Tom Ale – PR; Zakauri Clarke – SR; Nathan Cleary (c) – HB; Jack Cogger – HB, FE; Jack Cole – FE; Jaxen Edgar – FB; Dylan Edwards (vc) – FB; Sione Fonua – CE; Luke Garner – SR	Kalani Going – SR; Liam Henry – PR, SR; Tom Jenkins – WG; Mitch Kenny (vc) – HK; Moses Leota – PR; Freddy Lussick – HK; Liam Martin – SR; Casey McLean – CE; Jesse McLean – WG; Isaiah Papali'i – SR	Luron Patea – PR; Billy Phillips – LK; Billy Scott – HK; Lindsay Smith – PR; Scott Sorensen – SR; Izack Tago – CE; Blaize Talagi – FE; Brian To'o – WG; Isaah Yeo (c) – LK	Head coach: Ivan Cleary; Assistant coaches: Peter Wallace; Ben Harden; Jono Rolfe (Pathways Coach); Matt Eisenhuth (NSW Cup Coach); Scott Thompson (Jersey Flegg Cup Coach); Legend: (c) Captain(s); (vc) Vice-captain(s); Updated: 30 April 2026; Source(s): Panthers team profiles

== South Sydney Rabbitohs ==
South Sydney Rabbitohs 2026 squad
Top 30 squad - 2026 NRL season			Supplementary list	Coaching staff
Euan Aitken – SR; Jai Arrow – PR; Tallis Duncan – SR; Adam Elliott – LK; David Fifita – SR; Thomas Fletcher – SR; Bronson Garlick – HK; Jonah Glover – HB; Campbell Graham – WG; Moala Graham-Taufa – WG	Jye Gray – FB; Lachlan Hubner – SR; Jamie Humphreys – HB; Alex Johnston – WG; Sean Keppie – PR; Keaon Koloamatangi – PR; Edward Kosi – WG; Liam Le Blanc – PR; Peter Mamouzelos – HK; Max McCarthy – SR	Latrell Mitchell – CE; Tyrone Munro – WG; Cameron Murray (c) – LK; Brandon Smith – HK; Jayden Sullivan – HB; Isaiah Tass – WG, CE; Tevita Tatola – PR; Cody Walker (vc) – FE; Ashton Ward – HB; Jack Wighton – CE	Salesi Ataata – PR; Matt Humphries – HB; Elijah Keung – PR; Talanoa Penitani – CE; Latrell Siegwalt – CE; Nazareth Taua – SR; Extended squad: Bayleigh Bentley-Hape – WG; Matthew Dufty – FB; John Radel – PR	Head coach: Wayne Bennett; Assistant coaches: Ben Hornby; Steve Antonelli; John Sutton (Development); Trent Elkin (Head of Performance); Legend: (c) Captain(s); (vc) Vice-captain(s); Updated: 30 April 2026; Source(s): Rabbitohs squad

== St. George Illawarra Dragons ==
St. George Illawarra Dragons 2026 squad
Top 30 squad - 2026 NRL season			Supplementary list	Coaching staff
Daniel Atkinson – HB, FE; Hayden Buchanan – CE; Damien Cook (c) – HK; Ryan Couchman – SR; Toby Couchman – PR; Dylan Egan – SR; David Fale – WG; Mat Feagai – CE; Kyle Flanagan – FE, HB; Emre Guler – PR	Clint Gutherson (c) – FB; Jacob Halangahu – SR; Valentine Holmes – CE; Josh Kerr – PR; Lyhkan King-Togia – FE; Blake Lawrie – PR; Nathan Lawson – WG; Luciano Leilua – SR; Jacob Liddle – HK; Loko Pasifiki Tonga – PR	Hame Sele – LK; Tyrell Sloan – FB; Hamish Stewart – LK; Jaydn Su'A – SR; Moses Suli – CE; Nick Tsougranis – SR, CE; Christian Tuipulotu – WG; Leeroy Weatherall – SR	Cyrus Stanley-Traill – PR; Joseph O'Neill – HB, FE; Kade Reed – HB; Setu Tu – WG; Extended squad: Isaiah Fagalilo – HK; Ryan Hutchinson – PR	Head coach: Dean Young (Interim); Managers: Daniel Anderson (Head of Recruitment & Pathways); Legend: (c) Captain(s); (vc) Vice-captain(s); Updated: 30 April 2026; Source(s): Dragons team profiles

== Sydney Roosters ==
Sydney Roosters 2026 squad
Top 30 squad - 2026 NRL season			Supplementary list	Coaching staff
Egan Butcher – LK; Nat Butcher – SR; Daly Cherry-Evans – FE; Lindsay Collins – PR; Angus Crichton – SR; Jake Elliott – FE, HK, LK, HB; Salesi Foketi – SR; Benaiah Ioelu – HK; Spencer Leniu – PR; Taylor Losalu – PR	Mark Nawaqanitawase – WG; Fetalaiga Pauga – CE; Cody Ramsey – FB, WG; Victor Radley – LK, SR; Reece Robson – HK; Toby Rodwell – HB; Tom Rodwell – WG; Hugo Savala – CE; Billy Smith – CE; Blake Steep – LK	Tommy Talau – CE, WG; James Tedesco (c) – FB; Robert Toia – CE; Daniel Tupou – WG; Junior Tupou – WG; De La Salle Va'a – PR; Sam Walker – HB; Connor Watson – HK, LK; Naufahu Whyte – PR; Siua Wong – SR	Rex Bassingthwaite – FB; Reece Foley – LK, HK, CE, FB	Head coach: Trent Robinson; Assistant coaches: Matt King; Michael Cheika; Tait Barnes; Brett Morris (NSW Cup Coach); Anthony Barnes (Jersey Flegg Coach); Managers: Mitchell Aubusson (Director of Football); Joel Carbone (Head of Recruitment); Legend: (c) Captain(s); (vc) Vice-captain(s); Updated: 30 April 2026; Source(s): Roosters team profiles

== Wests Tigers ==
Wests Tigers 2026 squad
Top 30 squad - 2026 NRL season			Supplementary list	Coaching staff
Jahream Bula – FB; Will Craig – CE, WG; Adam Doueihi – HB; Latu Fainu – HB; Samuela Fainu – SR; Sione Fainu – PR; Mavrik Geyer – SR; Patrick Herbert – CE; Tristan Hope – HK; Royce Hunt – PR	Apisai Koroisau (c) – HK; Kit Laulili'i – LK, PR; Luke Laulili'i – WG; Jarome Luai (c) – FE; Jock Madden – HB; Heamasi Makasini – WG; Heath Mason – FB, FE; Taylan May – CE; Terrell May – PR; Kai Pearce-Paul – SR	Fonua Pole – PR; Solomone Saukuru – CE; Alex Seyfarth – SR; Jeral Skelton – WG; Tony Sukkar – SR, PR; Starford To'a – CE; Sunia Turuva – WG, FB; Alex Twal – LK, PR	Bunty Afoa – PR; Javon Andrews – FE; Lachlan Broederlow – SR; Jared Haywood – HK; Charlie Murray – LK; Ethan Roberts – SR; Extended squad: Faaletino Tavana – WG	Head coach: Benji Marshall; Assistant coaches: Brett Hodgson; Chris Heighington; John Morris; Tyrone McCarthy (NSW Cup coach); Leon Latulipe (Jersey Flegg Cup Coach); Legend: (c) Captain(s); (vc) Vice-captain(s); Updated: 30 April 2026; Source(s): Wests Tigers,

== See also ==
- List of current NRL Women's team squads
- List of current NRL coaches
