= 2026 Melbourne Storm season =

NRL rugby league season

- NRL Rank: 10th
- 2026 record: Wins: 11; losses: 13
- Points scored: For: 594; against: 576

Team information
- CEO: Justin Rodski
- Coach: Craig Bellamy
- Captain: Harry Grant (21 matches) Jahrome Hughes (1 match) Josh King (1 match) Cameron Munster (1 match)
- Stadium: AAMI Park – 30,050
- Avg. attendance: 19,462 (Note: Home matches in Melbourne only)
- High attendance: 28,245 (Round 3) (Note: Regular season home matches in Melbourne only)

Top scorers
- Tries: Sualauvi Fa'alogo (18)
- Goals: Nick Meaney (66)
- Points: Nick Meaney (152)
← 2025	List of seasons	2027 →

The 2026 Melbourne Storm season was the 29th in the club's history, competing in the 2026 NRL season. The team was coached by Craig Bellamy, coaching the club for a 24th consecutive season. Harry Grant continued as club captain for a third season.

Melbourne missed the NRL finals for the first time since the 2010 NRL season, ending a 15-year streak of qualifying for the finals. It was the first time the club had ended the season with a losing record since Bellamy took over as coach ahead of the 2003 season.

The club also fielded teams in the New South Wales Rugby League competitions, including women's teams for the first time.

== Season summary ==
- Preseason – Joining the NRL squad during the preseason were uncapped development players Suli Pole, Angus Hinchey, Preston Conn and Mitchell Jennings.
- 5 January – It was reported that Melbourne were interested in signing former Parramatta Eels player Zac Lomax who had been conditionally released from his contract following the end of the 2025 season. As part of his conditional release, Lomax could not join another NRL club until the end of the 2028 NRL season.
- 6 January – Video is published of Eliesa Katoa undertaking a club preseason training session following surgery to relieve pressure on his brain in November 2025. Katoa had been ruled out of returning to the field for the entire 2026 season after suffering three head knocks while on international duty with Tonga.
- 9 January – Melbourne confirm the impending departures of both Nick Meaney and Tyran Wishart at the end of the 2026 season. Both players had signed with expansion team Perth Bears for their inaugural season in 2027.
- 13 January – It was reported that club CEO Justin Rodski turned down an approach to become the next CEO of the Essendon Football Club. Rodski had previously been an executive at the AFL club before joining the Storm.
- 6 February – The club announces that coach Craig Bellamy had signed a contract extension that will see him remain at the club until the end of the 2028 NRL season. Bellamy had previously had a rolling contract with the club as he entered his 24th season as head coach of the Storm, having coached the club in over 600 NRL matches.
- 13 February – In their first match of the 2026 NRL Pre-season Challenge, a youthful Storm team captained by Trent Loiero, but missing a host of first grade regulars, struggled against the Canberra Raiders at Queanbeyan's Seiffert Oval, going down 32–6. Melbourne's only try was scored by Liam Williams late in the second half.
- 20 February – Melbourne confirm that winger Xavier Coates will miss at least the first three months of the season after requiring Achilles tendon surgery. It was the same injury that forced Coates to miss the 2025 Kangaroo tour of England.
- 21 February – Melbourne fail to score in the second half of their final Pre-season Challenge match against the Gold Coast Titans, going down 42–12 at Sunshine Coast Stadium.
- 26 February – The club announced that it had entered into a pathways partnership with Mounties, for players from that club to play in the NSW Cup competition with Melbourne, and Victorian players to play in the Ron Massey Cup competition with Mounties.
- 27 February – Melbourne confirm that Harry Grant will continue as captain for a third season, heading an unchanged leadership group from the previous season. The club expanded its emerging leadership development program with Stefano Utoikamanu, Alec MacDonald and Ativalu Lisati joining Trent Loiero and Tyran Wishart in that group.
- 3 March – An out of court settlement was reached between Parramatta, Zac Lomax and Melbourne Storm following litigation commenced by Parramatta in the New South Wales Supreme Court to enforce their conditional release entered into with Lomax. It was reported that Melbourne paid A$250,000 to Parramatta to avoid further litigation and for Lomax to be available to join another NRL club without Parramatta's consent from November 2027. Melbourne were not able to come to an agreement with Parramatta to sign Lomax for the 2026 season, with Eels forward Ryan Matterson not entertaining a move to Melbourne to enable his contract payments to be removed from the Eels salary cap. There were also reports that Melbourne had offered Josiah Pahulu or Lazarus Vaalepu to Parramatta in order to facilitate the signing of Lomax.
- Round 1 – Melbourne score a dominant 52–4 win against the Parramatta Eels to extend the club's round 1 winning streak to 24 matches. Captain Harry Grant scored two tries, as did Sualauvi Fa'alogo. Rookies Cooper Clarke and Preston Conn made their NRL debuts after being members of the club's 2025 Jersey Flegg Cup premiership winning squad. Forward Davvy Moale made his club debut after joining the Storm for the 2026 season.
- Round 2 – Sua Fa'alogo scored his first NRL hat trick, scoring three tries in the second half of Melbourne's 46–20 win against the St. George Illawarra Dragons. In the same match, forward Angus Hinchey made his NRL debut, coming off the bench to score a late conversion attempt, while Jack Hetherington made his club debut, appearing for the Storm as his fifth NRL club.
- Round 3 – Previously winless Brisbane handed Melbourne their first defeat of the season, coming from a 14–0 deficit at half time to take a 18–14 win, holding the Storm scoreless in the second half. Referee Todd Smith awarded a dozen set restarts in the first 51 minutes of the match, with none in a frantic finish. It was the Broncos first victory at AAMI Park since 2016. The official attendance of 28,245 marked the second highest attended regular season fixture at AAMI Park.
- Round 4 – Three late tries to the North Queensland Cowboys hand them a 28–24 win over Melbourne. The Storm had lead 24–12 midway through the second half, meaning it was the sixth time since the start of the 2025 season that the club had failed to defend a lead of more than 10 points.
- 30 March – Fijian international forward Tui Kamikamica was rushed to hospital after suffering a suspected stroke while at home. Kamikamica was discharged from Royal Melbourne Hospital a few days later to begin rehabilitation.
- 30 March – It was confirmed that the 2026 season will be the last for Will Warbrick in Melbourne. The New Zealand international signing a three-year deal to move back to New Zealand from the 2027 season.
- 1 April – Weeks after making his NRL debut, rookie Cooper Clarke signed a new contract with the club until the end of the 2029 season.
- Round 5 – Penrith Panthers became the first team since the 2003 season to put 50 points on the Melbourne Storm, scoring a 50–10 win at CommBank Stadium. It was the Panthers biggest win against Melbourne and the Storm's heaviest defeat since the 2008 NRL Grand Final.
- Round 6 – Melbourne hand over the Michael Moore Trophy for the first time since 2016, losing 38–14 to the New Zealand Warriors at AAMI Park. It was the first time in 3,927 days that the Warriors had beaten Melbourne, ending a run of 17 straight defeats. Melbourne conceded six tries in the loss, their heaviest against the Warriors, with their losing streak stretching to four matches, the longest since the 2022 season.
- Round 8 – South Sydney defeat Melbourne for the first time in Victoria, ending a 20-match losing streak. The 48–6 loss was Melbourne's worst at AAMI Park and the club's heaviest defeat since 2003. Melbourne's only try coming from a piece of individual brilliance from Sua Fa'alogo in the second half.
- 30 April – It was revealed that Storm head coach Craig Bellamy had been diagnosed with a form of neurodegenerative disorder after recent testing. Storm chairman Matt Tripp said "despite our recent results, I firmly believe Craig is still coaching at an elite level and I have no doubt he is the right person to drive the club forward. Craig has the full support of the board, players, coaches, and staff to continue leading the club as he has done for the last 24 seasons."
- Round 9 – Despite leading 10–4 at half time, Melbourne slump to a seventh straight defeat, losing 28–10 to the Dolphins. The loss setting a new club record losing streak, eclipsing the previous longest losing streak set in 2002.
- Round 10 – Melbourne finally snap their losing streak in a 44–16 win over the Wests Tigers at AAMI Park. Cameron Munster scored two tries, his first in 364 days after last scoring on the same weekend against the Tigers in 2025.
- 5 June – On the verge of returning from injury, it was announced that winger Xavier Coates had again ruptured his Achilles tendon at training and would require surgery that would see him miss the entire 2026 season.
- 29 June – With a number of injuries impacting the squad, the club signs Oryn Keeley from the Dolphins before the transfer deadline. Keeley had previously signed a two-year contract with Melbourne to start ahead of the 2027 season.
- 30 June – Melbourne released forward Lazarus Vaalepu from the remainder of his contract effective immediately, allowing Vaalepu to take up an opportunity with Super League's Leigh Leopards. Vaalepu had played 11 NRL matches for the club, but had not featured in the NRL team during the 2026 season.
- 14 July – After missing the round 19 match against the Titans, it was revealed that Cameron Munster would miss up to six weeks after sustaining a knee injury. The five-eighth had surgery to repair a cartilage injury.
- 4 August – In the week after they both made their NRL debuts against the Bulldogs, Melbourne announce the contract extensions for both Hayden Watson and Jai Bowden until the end of the 2030 NRL season. The 19-year-olds had both played in the club's junior representative and NSW Cup teams during the 2026 season.
- 19 August – Following speculation throughout August, Melbourne Storm announced that EQT would become the new majority shareholder of the organisation, subject to NRL approval. The Swedish founded, global investment firm would keep existing Chairman Matt Tripp and CEO Justin Rodski in their roles following the purchase. The Storm ownership group had expressed the need for a capital injection to upgrade the team's headquarters and training facilities. The deal valued the organisation between A$150–200m.
- 20 August – Following his stroke in March, Tui Kamikamica announced his retirement from rugby league. Kamikamica had played 142 matches with the club after making his debut in 2017.
- Round 27 – Melbourne score a last second try to win their final match of the season, winning 24–20 against Cronulla. Trent Loiero scored the try following a stunning flick pass from Harry Grant in the lead-up. Earlier, the Sharks had two players put in the sin bin including rookie Michael Gabrael who knocked out Siulagi Tuimalata-Brown with an illegal tackle in the first half. Hugo Peel scored his first try for the Storm while Jahrome Hughes was forced from the field with a reoccurrence of his hamstring injury. Departing utility player Tyran Wishart played his 100th NRL match for Melbourne, while in his last match for the Storm, Nick Meaney took his career points total to 886 points to sit second behind Cameron Smith.
- 7 September – Marion Seve announced his retirement from rugby league, the Samoan international had played 52 NRL matches with the club since moving to Melbourne in 2018.
- 14 September – Cooper Clarke caps of his first season in the NRL by being voted the winner of the RLPA Rookie of the Year Award.
- 17 September – Melbourne announce the re-signings of five players with Moses Leo (2029), Hugo Peel (2029), Stanley Huen (2028), Trent Toelau (2027), and Jack Hetherington (2027) all extending their contracts with the club.

=== Milestone games ===
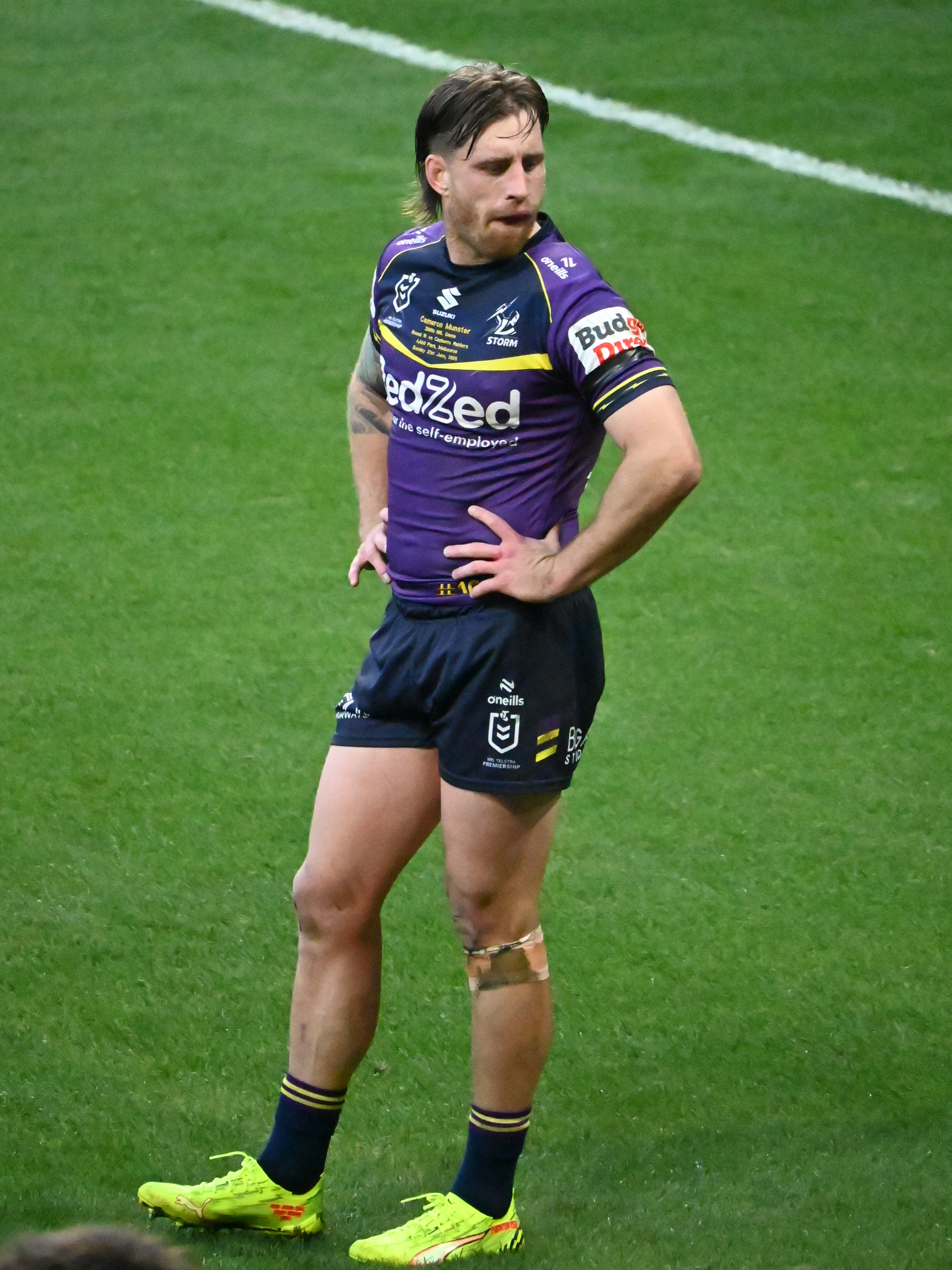
Cameron Munster made his 250th appearance for Melbourne in round 16

Round	Player	Milestone
Round 1	Davvy Moale	Storm debut
Round 1	Cooper Clarke	NRL debut
Round 1	Preston Conn	NRL debut
Round 2	Jack Hetherington	Storm debut
Round 2	Angus Hinchey	NRL debut
Round 4	Manaia Waitere	Storm debut
Round 7	Nick Meaney	1000 NRL points
Round 9	Hugo Peel	NRL debut
Round 9	Trent Toelau	Storm debut
Round 10	Stanley Huen	NRL debut
Round 12	Gabriel Satrick	NRL debut
Round 13	Jack Hetherington	100th NRL match
Round 16	Cameron Munster	250th match
Round 19	Oryn Keeley	Storm debut
Round 19	Josiah Pahulu	Storm debut
Round 21	Josh King	200th NRL match
Round 22	Hayden Watson	NRL debut
Round 22	Jai Bowden	NRL debut
Round 25	Jack Howarth	50th match
Round 27	Tyran Wishart	100th match

== Fixtures ==
=== Pre-season Challenge ===
Date	Rd	Opponent	Venue	Result	Mel.	Opp.	Tries	Goals	Field goals	Ref
13 February	Trial	Canberra Raiders	Seiffert Oval, Queanbeyan	Lost	6	32	L Williams	A Murgha 1/1		
21 February	Trial	Gold Coast Titans	Sunshine Coast Stadium, Sunshine Coast	Lost	12	42	H Peel, S Fa'alogo	T Wishart 2/2		

=== Regular season ===
==== Result by round ====
Round	1	2	3	4	5	6	7	8	9	10	11	12	13	14	15	16	17	18	19	20	21	22	23	24	25	26	27
Ground	H	A	H	A	A	H	A	H	A	H	N	A	H	H	–	H	A	–	H	A	A	H	N	–	H	A	A
Result	W	W	L	L	L	L	L	L	L	W	W	L	W	W	B	W	L	B	W	L	L	L	W	B	L	W	W
Position	1	1	4	7	11	13	15	16	16	15	13	15	13	11	11	11	12	11	10	11	12	12	11	11	11	11	10
Points	2	4	4	4	4	4	4	4	4	6	8	8	10	12	14	16	16	18	20	20	20	20	22	24	24	26	28

Source: National Rugby League
A = Away; H = Home; N = Neutral; B = Bye; W = Win; D = Draw; L = Loss

==== Matches ====
- (g.p.) – Golden Point extra time
- (pen) – Penalty try

Date	Rd	Opponent	H/A	Venue	Result	Mel.	Opp.	Tries	Goals	Field goals	Ref
5 March	1	Parramatta Eels	H	AAMI Park, Melbourne	Won	52	4	H Grant (2), S Fa'alogo (2), W Warbrick, J Howarth, J Chan, M Leo, A Lisati	N Meaney 8/9		
14 March	2	St George Illawarra Dragons	A	WIN Stadium, Wollongong	Won	46	20	S Fa'alogo (3), W Warbrick, J Howarth, H Grant, J Hughes, M Leo	N Meaney 6/8, A Hinchey 1/1	C Munster 0/1	
20 March	3 (Note: Multicultural Round)	Brisbane Broncos	H	AAMI Park, Melbourne	Lost	14	18	S Fa'alogo, J Chan	H Grant 3/3		
28 March	4	North Queensland Cowboys	A	QCB Stadium, Townsville	Lost	24	28	W Warbrick (4), S Fa'alogo	H Grant 2/5		
3 April	5	Penrith Panthers	A	CommBank Stadium, Sydney	Lost	10	50	M Waitere, S Fa'alogo	N Meaney 1/2		
11 April	6	New Zealand Warriors	H	AAMI Park, Melbourne	Lost	14	38	C Clarke, J Howarth	N Meaney 3/3		
17 April	7	Canberra Raiders	A	GIO Stadium, Canberra	Lost	22	26	N Meaney (2), S Fa'alogo, W Warbrick	N Meaney 3/4		
25 April	8 (Note: ANZAC Round)	South Sydney Rabbitohs	H	AAMI Park, Melbourne	Lost	6	48	S Fa’alogo	N Meaney 1/1		
1 May	9	Dolphins	A	Suncorp Stadium, Brisbane	Lost	10	28	T Wishart, S Fa’alogo	N Meaney 1/2		
10 May	10	Wests Tigers	H	AAMI Park, Melbourne	Won	44	16	W Warbrick (2), C Munster (2), S Fa'alogo, J Hughes, H Grant, A Lisati	N Meaney 6/8		
16 May	11 (Note: Magic Round)	Parramatta Eels	N	Suncorp Stadium, Brisbane	Won	34	8	M Leo, J Howarth, C Munster, C Clarke, H Grant, J King	N Meaney 5/6		
22 May	12	Canterbury-Bankstown Bulldogs	A	Accor Stadium, Sydney	Lost	20	30	M Leo (2), J King	N Meaney 4/4		
30 May	13	Sydney Roosters	H	AAMI Park, Melbourne	Won	18	4	H Grant, W Warbrick, M Leo	S Fa'alogo 3/5	H Grant 0/1, J Hughes 0/1	
5 June	14	Newcastle Knights	H	AAMI Park, Melbourne	Won	32	30	S Utoikamanu, M Waitere, W Warbrick, J Hughes, M Leo, T Loiero	S Fa'alogo 4/6		
13 June	15	Bye									
21 June	16	Canberra Raiders	H	AAMI Park, Melbourne	Won	42	20	W Warbrick (3), A Lisati, C Munster, M Leo, S Fa'alogo, T Toelau	S Fa'alogo 4/6, H Grant 0/1, C Munster 1/1		
27 June	17	Manly Warringah Sea Eagles	A	4 Pines Park, Sydney	Lost	4	30	W Warbrick	S Fa'alogo 0/1		
4 July	18	Bye									
12 July	19	Gold Coast Titans	H	AAMI Park, Melbourne	Won	22	18	W Warbick, J Howarth, A MacDonald, N Meaney	N Meaney 3/4		
17 July	20 (Note: Women in League Round)	Sydney Roosters	A	Allianz Stadium, Sydney	Lost	6	14	S Utoikamanu	N Meaney 1/1		
24 July	21	South Sydney Rabbitohs	A	Accor Stadium, Sydney	Lost	26	28	S Tuimalatu-Brown, O Keeley, S Fa'alogo, T Wishart, N Meaney	T Wishart 3/6		
31 July	22	Canterbury-Bankstown Bulldogs	H	AAMI Park, Melbourne	Lost	22	36	M Leo (2), S Fa'alogo, A Hinchey	N Meaney 3/4		
8 August	23 (Note: Indigenous Round)	Manly Warringah Sea Eagles	N	HBF Park, Perth	Won	42	20	T Wishart, H Watson, O Keeley, S Fa'alogo, M Leo, S Tuimalatu-Brown	N Meaney 9/9		
15 August	24	Bye									
20 August	25	Penrith Panthers	H	AAMI Park, Melbourne	Lost	14	22	T Wishart, J Howarth, S Tuimalatu-Brown	N Meaney 1/3		
27 August	26	Brisbane Broncos	A	Suncorp Stadium, Brisbane	Won	46	20	S Tuimalatu-Brown (3), T Wishart (2), S Utoikamanu, N Meaney, S Fa'alogo	N Meaney 7/8		
5 September	27	Cronulla-Sutherland Sharks	A	Ocean Protect Stadium, Sydney	Won	24	20	H Peel, S Fa'alogo, A MacDonald, T Loiero	N Meaney 4/4		

Fixture notes:

== Ladder ==
Pos	Team	Pld	W	D	L	B	PF	PA	PD	Pts	Qualification
1	Penrith Panthers	24	18	0	6	3	683	347	+336	42	Advance to finals series
2	New Zealand Warriors	24	18	0	6	3	728	418	+310	42	Advance to finals series
3	Dolphins	24	17	0	7	3	662	506	+156	40	Advance to finals series
4	Sydney Roosters (P)	24	16	0	8	3	619	501	+118	38	Advance to finals series
5	Cronulla-Sutherland Sharks	24	14	0	10	3	672	523	+149	34	Advance to finals series
6	South Sydney Rabbitohs	24	14	0	10	3	694	581	+113	34	Advance to finals series
7	Newcastle Knights	24	14	0	10	3	633	591	+42	34	Advance to finals series
8	North Queensland Cowboys	24	13	0	11	3	568	652	−84	32	Advance to finals series
9	Manly Warringah Sea Eagles	24	11	0	13	3	623	524	+99	28	
10	Melbourne Storm	24	11	0	13	3	594	576	+18	28	
11	Canberra Raiders	24	11	0	13	3	581	626	−45	28	
12	Canterbury-Bankstown Bulldogs	24	11	0	13	3	476	536	−60	28	
13	Parramatta Eels	24	9	0	15	3	497	678	−181	24	
14	Brisbane Broncos	24	8	0	16	3	471	677	−206	22	
15	Wests Tigers	24	8	0	16	3	445	699	−254	22	
16	Gold Coast Titans	24	6	0	18	3	477	663	−186	18	
17	St. George Illawarra Dragons	24	5	0	19	3	392	717	−325	16	

Source: National Rugby League
Rules for classification: 1) competition points; 2) points differential; 3) percentage; (Note: Greater percentage of points scored for and against, being determined by points scored for divided by points scored against expressed as a percentage.) 4) tries scored; (Note: Further tiebreakers (in order) include goals scored, field goals kicked; least amount of penalties conceded.)
(P) Premiers

== Coaching staff ==
- Craig Bellamy – Head Coach
- Marc Brentnall – Assistant Coach
- Aaron Bellamy – Assistant Coach
- Ryan Hinchcliffe – Assistant Coach
- Todd Lowrie – Development Coach

== 2026 squad ==
List current as of 31 July 2026

Cap	Nat.	Player name	Position	First Storm game	Previous First Grade RL club (Note: Previous First Grade RL club: This column denotes the previous RL club the player was signed to and played first grade RL for. If they are yet to debut then this is stipulated. If they were merely signed to the club but did not play then it is not counted)
160	(Australia)	Cameron Munster	FE, FB	2014	(Australia) Melbourne Storm
181	(Fiji)	Tui Kamikamica	SR, PR	2017	(Australia) Melbourne Storm
184	(New Zealand)	Jahrome Hughes	FE, HB	2017	(Australia) North Queensland Cowboys
188	(Australia)	Harry Grant	HK	2018	(Australia) Melbourne Storm
193	(Samoa)	Marion Seve	WG	2019	(Australia) Melbourne Storm
212	(Australia)	Trent Loiero	SR	2021	(Australia) Melbourne Storm
217	(Papua New Guinea)	Xavier Coates	WG	2022	(Australia) Brisbane Broncos
218	(Australia)	Nick Meaney	FB	2022	(Australia) Canterbury Bulldogs
219	(Australia)	Josh King	PR	2022	(Australia) Newcastle Knights
220	(Australia)	Tyran Wishart	FE, HK	2022	(Australia) Melbourne Storm
221	(Australia)	Alec MacDonald	LK	2022	(Australia) Melbourne Storm
225	(New Zealand)	William Warbrick	CE, WG	2023	(Australia) Melbourne Storm
226	(Tonga)	Eliesa Katoa	SR	2023	New Zealand Warriors
231	(Samoa)	Sualauvi Fa'alogo	FB, WG	2023	(Australia) Melbourne Storm
232	(Australia)	Jack Howarth	SR	2023	(Australia) Melbourne Storm
233	(France)	Joe Chan	SR	2023	(France) Catalans Dragons
234	(Australia)	Shawn Blore	SR	2024	(Australia) Wests Tigers
235	(Samoa)	Lazarus Vaalepu	PR	2024	(Australia) Melbourne Storm
236	(Australia)	Keagan Russell-Smith	FE, HB	2024	(Australia) Melbourne Storm
237	(Samoa)	Ativalu Lisati	PR	2024	(Australia) Melbourne Storm
239	(Samoa)	Stefano Utoikamanu	PR	2025	(Australia) Wests Tigers
240	(New Zealand)	Moses Leo	CE, WG	2025	(Australia) Melbourne Storm
241	(Australia)	Siulagi Tuimalatu-Brown	CE, WG	2025	(Australia) Melbourne Storm
242	(Cook Islands)	Davvy Moale	PR, SR	2026	(Australia) South Sydney Rabbitohs
243	(Australia)	Cooper Clarke	PR, SR	2026	(Australia) Melbourne Storm
244	(Australia)	Preston Conn	LK, SR	2026	(Australia) Melbourne Storm
245	(Australia)	Jack Hetherington	SR, PR	2026	(Australia) Newcastle Knights
246	(Australia)	Angus Hinchey	SR	2026	(Australia) Melbourne Storm
247	(New Zealand)	Manaia Waitere	CE	2026	(Australia) Canberra Raiders
248	(Australia)	Hugo Peel	FB	2026	(Australia) Melbourne Storm
249	(Australia)	Trent Toelau	FE	2026	(Australia) Penrith Panthers
250	(Australia)	Stanley Huen	FE	2026	(Australia) Melbourne Storm
251	(Australia)	Gabriel Satrick	HK	2026	(Australia) Melbourne Storm
252	(Australia)	Oryn Keeley	SR	2026	(Australia) Dolphins
253	(New Zealand)	Josiah Pahulu	PR	2026	(Australia) Gold Coast Titans
254	(Australia)	Hayden Watson	HB, FE, HK	2026	(Australia) Melbourne Storm
255	(Australia)	Jai Bowden	HK	2026	(Australia) Melbourne Storm
–	(Australia)	Jak Goulding	PR	Yet to debut	(Australia) Melbourne Storm
–	(Australia)	Mitchell Jennings	CE	Yet to debut	(Australia) Melbourne Storm
–	(Australia)	Amare Milford	SR	Yet to debut	(Australia) Melbourne Storm
–	(Australia)	Jerry Musu	PR	Yet to debut	(Australia) Melbourne Storm
–	(Australia)	Suli Pole	PR	Yet to debut	(Australia) Melbourne Storm

== Player movements ==
Losses

- Grant Anderson to Brisbane Broncos
- Nelson Asofa-Solomona to Retired
- Kane Bradley to Brisbane Broncos
- Bronson Garlick to South Sydney Rabbitohs
- Dean Ieremia to Gold Coast Titans
- Ryan Papenhuyzen to Retired
- Jonah Pezet to Parramatta Eels
- Lazarus Vaalepu to Leigh Leopards (midseason)
- Coby Williamson to Released

Gains

- Jack Hetherington from Newcastle Knights
- Oryn Keeley from Dolphins (midseason)
- Davvy Moale from South Sydney Rabbitohs
- Trent Toelau from Penrith Panthers
- Manaia Waitere from Canberra Raiders

== Representative honours ==
This table lists all players who have played a representative match in 2026.

- (c) = Captain
- (vc) = Vice-captain

Player	NRL All Star match	State of Origin 1	State of Origin 2	State of Origin 3	Internationals/World Cup
Shawn Blore	—N/a	—N/a	—N/a	—N/a	Samoa
Joe Chan	Māori	—N/a	—N/a	—N/a	—N/a
Sualauvi Fa'alogo	—N/a	—N/a	—N/a	—N/a	Samoa
Harry Grant	—N/a	Queensland	Queensland	Queensland	Australia
Jahrome Hughes	—N/a	—N/a	—N/a	—N/a	New Zealand
Joseph Litidamu	—N/a	—N/a	—N/a	—N/a	Fiji
Trent Loiero	—N/a	Queensland	Queensland	Queensland	—N/a
Nick Meaney	—N/a	—N/a	—N/a	—N/a	Prime Minister's XIII
Amare Milford	—N/a	—N/a	—N/a	—N/a	Cook Islands
Davvy Moale	—N/a	—N/a	—N/a	—N/a	Cook Islands
Cameron Munster	—N/a	Queensland (c)	Queensland (c)	Queensland (c)	Australia
K-Ci Newton-Whare	—N/a	—N/a	—N/a	—N/a	Cook Islands
Trent Toelau	Māori	—N/a	—N/a	—N/a	—N/a
David Tuariki	—N/a	—N/a	—N/a	—N/a	Cook Islands
Stefano Utoikamanu	—N/a	—N/a	—N/a	—N/a	Tonga
Manaia Waitere	Māori	—N/a	—N/a	—N/a	—N/a

Additionally the following Melbourne Storm junior players were selected for Queensland in the under-19s State of Origin match: Alize Clark, Kobi Floro, Frank Howarth, Joseph Litidamu, Jett Ryan, and Hayden Watson. Watson was appointed captain, leading the Queensland team which included Clark, Howarth, Litidamu, and Ryan in the final squad.

== Statistics ==
This table contains playing statistics for all Melbourne Storm players to have played in the 2026 NRL season.

- Updated to end of season
- Statistics sources:

Name	Appearances	Tries	Goals	Field goals	Points
Jai Bowden	1	0	0	0	0
Shawn Blore	13	0	0	0	0
Joe Chan	18	2	0	0	8
Cooper Clarke	24	2	0	0	8
Preston Conn	1	0	0	0	0
Sualauvi Fa'alogo	24	18	11	0	86
Harry Grant	21	6	5	0	34
Jack Hetherington	9	0	0	0	0
Angus Hinchey	6	1	1	0	6
Jack Howarth	17	6	0	0	24
Stanley Huen	4	0	0	0	0
Jahrome Hughes	18	3	0	0	12
Tui Kamikamica	4	0	0	0	0
Oryn Keeley	8	2	0	0	8
Josh King	24	2	0	0	8
Moses Leo	17	11	0	0	44
Ativalu Lisati	10	3	0	0	12
Trent Loiero	21	2	0	0	8
Alec MacDonald	19	2	0	0	8
Nick Meaney	20	5	66	0	152
Davvy Moale	10	0	0	0	0
Cameron Munster	19	4	0	0	16
Josiah Pahulu	1	0	0	0	0
Hugo Peel	3	1	0	0	4
Keagan Russell-Smith	1	0	0	0	0
Gabriel Satrick	1	0	0	0	0
Marion Seve	1	0	0	0	0
Trent Toelau	11	1	0	0	4
Siulagi Tuimalatu-Brown	12	6	0	0	24
Stefano Utoikamanu	24	3	0	0	12
Manaia Waitere	8	2	0	0	8
William Warbrick	18	16	0	0	64
Hayden Watson	2	1	0	0	4
Tyran Wishart	18	6	3	0	80
34 players used	—	105	87	0	594

=== Scorers ===
Most points in a game: 18

- Round 23 – Nick Meaney (9 goals) vs Manly Sea Eagles
- Round 26 – Nick Meaney (1 try, 7 goals) vs Brisbane Broncos

Most tries in a game: 4

- Round 4 – Will Warbrick vs North Queensland Cowboys

=== Winning games ===
Highest score in a winning game: 52 points

- Round 1 vs Parramatta Eels

Lowest score in a winning game: 18 points

- Round 13 vs Sydney Roosters

Greatest winning margin: 48

- Round 1 vs Parramatta Eels

Greatest number of games won consecutively: 3

- Round 13–16

=== Losing games ===
Highest score in a losing game: 26 points

- Round 21 vs South Sydney Rabbitohs

Lowest score in a losing game: 4 points

- Round 17 vs Manly Warringah Sea Eagles

Greatest losing margin: 42 points

- Round 8 vs South Sydney Rabbitohs

Greatest number of games lost consecutively: 7 (Note: New club record)

- Round 3–9

=== NRL Judiciary ===
A number of Melbourne players were cited by the match review committee for incidents through the 2026 season, with the following results from the NRL Judiciary.

Round	Player	Offence & grade	Result	Ref
Round 4	Manaia Waitere	High tackle — Careless (grade 1)	fined $1,000	
Round 5	Trent Loiero	Dangerous contact (grade 1)	fined $3,000	
Round 6	Trent Loiero	High tackle – Careless (grade 1)	fined $3,000	
Round 6	Jahrome Hughes	High tackle – Careless (grade 1)	fined $1,800	
Round 7	Manaia Waitere	High tackle — Careless (grade 1)	fined $1,800	
Round 8	Nick Meaney	High tackle — Careless (grade 1)	fined $1,000	
Round 19	Oryn Keeley	Dangerous contact – Tripping (grade 1)	fined $1,000	
Round 20	Jack Howarth	Crusher tackle (grade 1)	fined $1,500	
Round 20	Jack Hetherington	High tackle – Careless (grade 1)	fined $1,000	
Round 22	Oryn Keeley	Dangerous contact (grade 1)	fined $1,800	
Round 22	Trent Toelau	High tackle – Careless (grade 1)	fined $1,000	
Round 23	Cameron Munster	Dangerous contact (grade 1)	fined $750	
Round 25	Josh King	Dangerous contact (grade 1)	fined $1,000	
Round 26	Harry Grant	High tackle – Careless (grade 1)	fined $1,000	
Round 26	Moses Leo	High tackle – Careless (grade 1)	fined $1,000	
Round 27	Josh King	Crusher tackle (grade 1)	fined $3,000	

Note: Harry Grant was fined seven percent of his match payment for a high tackle – careless (grade 1) during the first State of Origin match.

== Jerseys ==
Home	Away

In November 2023, Melbourne Storm announced a new sponsorship and apparel partnership agreement with Irish sportswear company O'Neills. In March 2025, major sponsor RedZed extended their partnership with the club until the end of the 2028 season, with their logo to remain on the club's jersey for a seventh season. Insurance company Budget Direct joined the club as a new sponsorship partner, with the logo added to the sleeves of all jerseys.

Home

Unveiled in November 2025, the club's refreshed jersey sees purple return as the predominant colour of the home jersey design. The design featured a gold chevron beneath a navy blue yoke, while the shoulder panels and sleeves were both purple. A new addition were gold lightning bolts inside the sleeve cuffs.

Away

Also released for sale in November 2025, the club's away jersey also was refreshed for 2026. Predominantly white and worn with white shorts, the jersey features a simple design with purple, navy blue and gold chevrons across the top of the chest. A subtle pattern through the design was said to be "inspired by the topography of Melbourne," while the sleeve cuffs also featured a lightning bolt motif similar to the home jersey.

ANZAC Day

In April, the club released a special jersey worn against South Sydney in their annual Anzac Day match at AAMI Park. The design was in honour of the 85th anniversary of the The Rats of Tobruk, when Australian-led troops defended the Allied garrison during the Siege of Tobruk in Libya in 1941. The jersey features a desert-like camouflage design in the club colours of navy blue and purple and features the words of 9th Division commanding officer Leslie Morshead on the jersey collar "there is to be no surrender and no retreat," as well as the Anzac Appeal logo and the insignia of the Rats of Tobruk.

Indigenous

Ahead of the NRL Indigenous Round, Melbourne released their 2026 Indigenous jersey which was worn in round 23. The design featured artwork by Edna Ambrym with details associated with Torres Strait Islander culture to celebrate the story of 2026 Storm debutant Gabriel Satrick. The main part of the jersey is a depiction of Jilara Oval in Yarrabah, Queensland, the home town of Satrick.

== NSW Cup team ==
After ending their Queensland Cup affiliations during 2025, Melbourne reinstated a team in the New South Wales Rugby League's New South Wales Cup competition. It was the first time since the 2010 season that the club had a reserve grade team operating out of Melbourne.

2025 Jersey Flegg Cup premiership coach Mark Russell took the reins as coach of the team.

The team won six matches across the season, spending most of the season in 13th position on the ladder out of the 14 teams in the competition. The club used 44 players across the season, with K-Ci Newton-Whare making the most appearances with 22.

Following the end of the season, coach Mark Russell departed the club for another coaching opportunity in Sydney.

=== Results ===
Key
H	Home match
A	Away match
N	Neutral venue match

Table of season results
Round	Date	Result	Score	Opponent	Score	Ground	
1	5 March	Lost	22	Parramatta Eels	36	AAMI Park	H
2	14 March	Lost	26	St George Illawarra Dragons	42	WIN Stadium	A
3	21 March	Won	20	Newtown Jets	12	Seabrook Reserve	H
4	Bye						
5	3 April	Lost	12	Penrith Panthers	40	CommBank Stadium	A
6	11 April	Won	32	New Zealand Warriors	24	AAMI Park	H
7	18 April	Lost	12	Canberra Raiders	48	Seiffert Oval	A
8	24 April	Lost	16	South Sydney Rabbitohs	22	Seabrook Reserve	H
9	3 May	Lost	20	Newcastle Knights	46	McDonald Jones Stadium	A
10	10 May	Lost	22	Western Suburbs Magpies	38	AAMI Park	H
11	17 May	Lost	4	New Zealand Warriors	46	North Sydney Oval	N
12	23 May	Lost	14	Canterbury-Bankstown Bulldogs	38	Belmore Sports Ground	A
13	30 May	Won	60	Sydney Roosters	6	AAMI Park	H
14	6 June	Lost	28	Newcastle Knights	34	Seabrook Reserve	H
15	Bye						
16	21 June	Lost	26	Canberra Raiders	36	AAMI Park	H
17	28 June	Won	43	North Sydney Bears	22	Scully Park	N
18	Bye						
19	12 July	Won	20	Newtown Jets	18	Henson Park	A
20	17 July	Lost	18	Sydney Roosters	27	Allianz Stadium	A
21	25 July	Lost	22	South Sydney Rabbitohs	26	Redfern Oval	A
22	31 July	Lost	10	Canterbury-Bankstown Bulldogs	20	Seabrook Reserve	H
23	9 August	Won	26	Manly Warringah Sea Eagles	18	Seabrook Reserve	H
24	Bye						
25	21 August	Lost	20	Penrith Panthers	40	Seabrook Reserve	H
26	29 August	Lost	6	North Sydney Bears	32	North Sydney Oval	A

=== Statistics ===
Most points in a game: 18

- Round 13 – Josh Durkin (9 goals) vs Sydney Roosters

Most tries in a game: 4

- Round 6 – Hugo Peel vs Warriors

Leading tryscorer (season):

- Angus Hinchey – 10

Leading pointscorer (season):

- Josh Durkin – 47 (1 try, 21 goals, 1 field goal)

== Junior Representatives ==
The club entered teams in the 2026 New South Wales Rugby League (NSWRL) male junior representative competitions with the following coaching staff:

- Jersey Flegg Cup (Under-21s): Dan Murphy (coach), Nate Myles (assistant)
- S.G. Ball Cup (Under-19s): Matt Duffie (coach), Justin O'Neill (assistant), Ryan Hoffman (assistant)
- Harold Matthews Cup (Under-17s): Caine Sinclair (coach)

Todd Lowrie was appointed the club's Head of Development in addition to his role with the NRL squad.

In a first for the Melbourne Storm, the club entered teams into the NSWRL's female junior representative competitions, the Under-19s Tarsha Gale Cup and the Under-17s Lisa Fiaola Cup. Former Cronulla Sharks development coach Jack Gould was appointed the coach of both teams, under female pathways manager Pauline Poloai. Janan Billings would take the role as coach of the Under-17s squad before the start of the season, leaving Gould in charge of just the Under-19s squad.

Most home matches for each of the junior representative squads were played at Seabrook Reserve in Broadmeadows, the home of NRL Victoria. Some matches were also scheduled for Gosch's Paddock, the training venue for the NRL team and Casey Fields.

In their first season, the under-17s girls squad won four and had one draw from their eight matches to qualify for the finals of the Lisa Fioala Cup. The boys under-19s squad won seven of their eight matches to qualify in second place, making the finals for the second successive season in the S.G. Ball Cup.

== Awards ==
=== Melbourne Storm Awards Night ===
Held at Crown Palladium on Sunday, 6 September.

- Cameron Smith Player of the Year: Sualauvi Fa'alogo
- Billy Slater Rookie of the Year: Cooper Clarke
- Melbourne Storm Members' Player of Year: Sualauvi Fa'alogo
- Melbourne Storm Most Improved: Sualauvi Fa'alogo
- Melbourne Storm Best Back: Tyran Wishart
- Melbourne Storm Best Forward: Stefano Utoikamanu
- Cooper Cronk Medal (NSW Cup Player of the Year): Angus Hinchey
- Mick Moore Club Person of the Year: Eliesa Katoa
- Chairman's Award: Tom Soulsby
- Darren Bell Medal (Jersey Flegg Cup U21s Player of the Year): Lucas Hinchey
- Melbourne Storm Academy Player of the Year: Hayden Watson
- Best Try: Sualauvi Fa'alogo (round 9)
- Life Member Inductees: Dr Jason Chan, Tui Kamikamica, Jahrome Hughes

=== Rugby League Players' Association Awards ===
- RLPA Rookie of the Year: Cooper Clarke

=== Additional awards ===
- I Don't Quit Iron Bar: Jack Hetherington
- Ken Stephen Medal nominee: Ativalu Lisati
- 2026 Rugby League World Cup – Team of the Tournament:
  - Cameron Munster (five-eighth)
  - Harry Grant (hooker)

=== Junior representative awards ===
Held at AAMI Park in May, for members of the club's Harold Matthews Cup (U17s) and S.G. Ball Cup (U19s) teams, and in June for the Lisa Fioala Cup (U17s) and Tarsha Gale Cup (U19s) squads:

Boys

- Greg Brentnall U19s Player of the Year: Hayden Watson
- Coaches' Award: Phoenix Woods
- Best Back (U19s): Alize Clarke
- Best Forward (U19s): Lockyer-Azile Foliola
- U19s Players' Player: Joseph Litidamu
- Young Tonumaipea U17s Player of the Year: Ofa'Benjamin Nau
- Coaches' Award: Conner Pendergast
- Best Back (U17s): Hunter Stokie
- Best Forward (U17s): Arama Paraha
- U17s Players' Player: Devyn Taru

Girls

- Junior Representative Club Person of the Year: Rachel Pezzano
- Storm Pathways Player of the Year: Halo Titimaea
- Best Back (U17s): Makerita Seinafolava
- Best Forward (U17s): Harmony Taupau
- Most Improved (U17s): Caprice Buskermolen
- U17s Player of the Year: Halo Titimaea
- Best Back (U19s): Gina Aiono
- Best Forward (U19s): TBC
- Most Improved (U19s): Toefiliga Lokeni
- U19s Player of the Year: Eboni Heurea
