= List of Melbourne Storm representatives =

Including players from the Melbourne Storm that have represented while contracted at the club and the years they achieved their honours, if known.

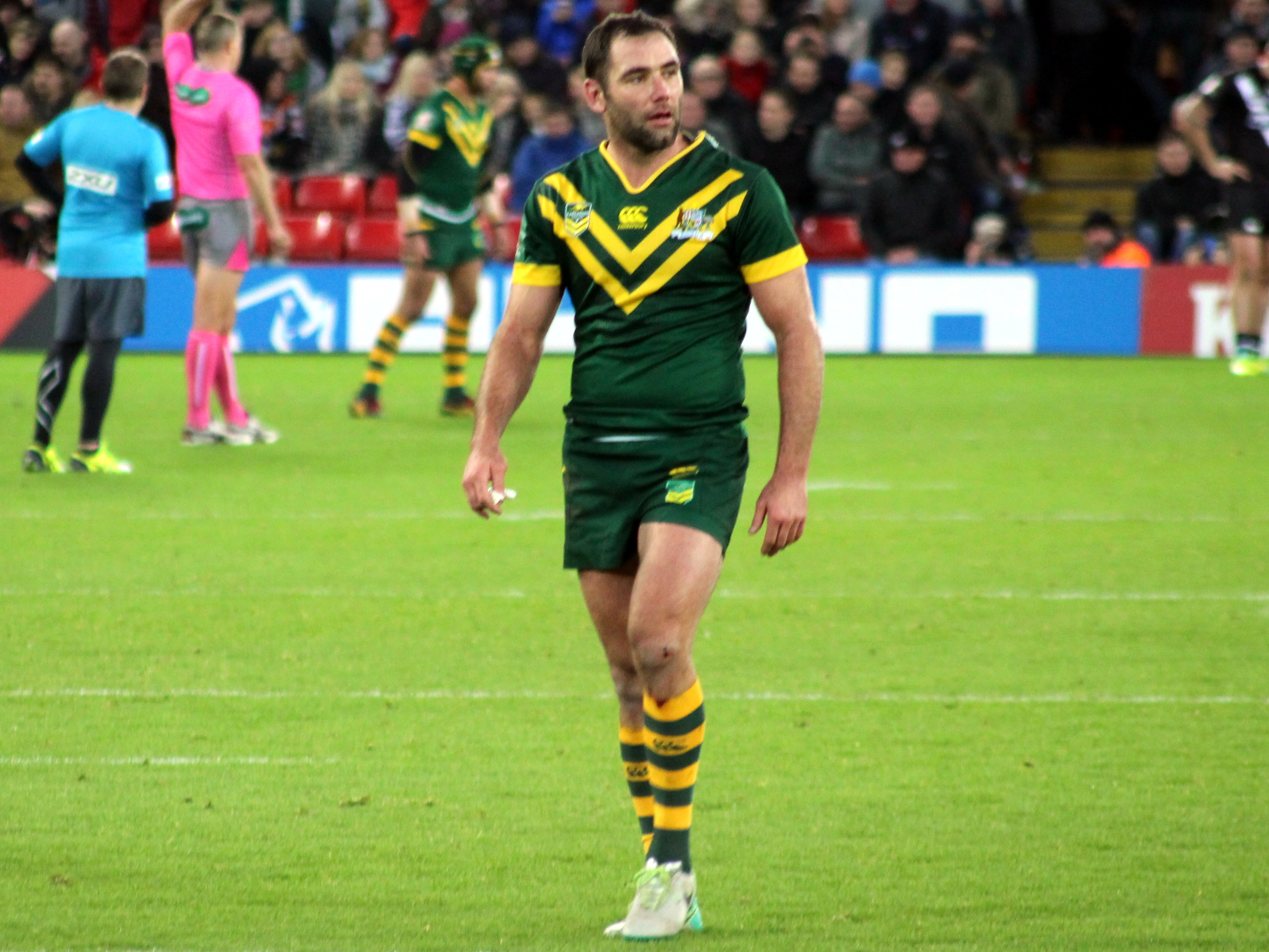
Cameron Smith represented Australia in 56 matches and was captain in 33 matches.

== International ==
=== Australia ===
- 603 (Australia) Glenn Lazarus (1998–1999)
- 660 (Australia) Rodney Howe (1998–2000)
- 666 (Australia) Robbie Kearns (1998–2001, 2003)
- 675 (Australia) Brett Kimmorley (1999–2000)
- 677 (Australia) Robbie Ross (1999)
- 682 (Australia) Scott Hill (2000, 2002, 2004)
- 727 (Australia) Matt King (2005–2007)
- 737 (Australia) Greg Inglis (2006–2010)
- 738 (Australia) Cameron Smith (2006–2017)
- 742 (Australia) Antonio Kaufusi (2006)
- 714 (Australia) Michael Crocker (2007–2008)
- 744 (Australia) Cooper Cronk (2007, 2009–2017)
- 745 (Australia) Israel Folau (2007–2008)
- 746 (Australia) Dallas Johnson (2007)
- 748 (Australia) Ryan Hoffman (2007–2012)
- 751 (Australia) Billy Slater (2008–2017)
- 767 (Australia) Brett White (2009)
- 800 (Australia) Will Chambers (2015–2017)
- 818 (Australia) Jordan McLean (2017)
- 821 (Australia) Felise Kaufusi (2017–2018)
- 822 (Australia) Cameron Munster (2017–2023, 2025–2026)
- 827 (Australia) Josh Addo-Carr (2019)
- 839 (Australia) Harry Grant (2022–2026)
- 852 (Australia) Xavier Coates (2024)

=== Cook Islands ===
- (Cook Islands) Fred Makimare (2009)
- (Cook Islands) Aaron Teroi (2015)
- (Cook Islands) Josh Minhinnick (2015)
- (Cook Islands) Charnze Nicoll-Klokstad (2015)
- (Cook Islands) Tepai Moeroa (2022–2024)
- (Cook Islands) Davvy Moale (2026)
- (Cook Islands) Amare Milford (2026)
- (Cook Islands) K-Ci Newton-Whare (2026)
- (Cook Islands) David Tuariki (2026)

=== England ===
- 701 (England) Gareth Widdop (2010–2013)

=== Fiji ===
- (Fiji) Setariki Rakabula (2000)
- (Fiji) Sisa Waqa (2011–2013)
- (Fiji) Marika Koroibete (2015)
- (Fiji) Ben Nakubuwai (2016)
- (Fiji) Tui Kamikamica (2016–2025)
- (Fiji) Suliasi Vunivalu (2017–2019)
- (Fiji) Isaac Lumelume (2019)
- (Fiji) Joseph Litidamu (2026)

=== France ===
- (France) Dane Chisholm (2011)

=== Ireland ===
- (Republic of Ireland) Danny Williams (2000)

=== Italy ===
- (Italy) Daniel Atkinson (2022)
- (Italy) Cooper Johns (2022)

=== Lebanon ===
- (Lebanon) Travis Robinson (2015)

=== New Zealand ===
- 640 (New Zealand) Stephen Kearney (1999–2004)
- 680 (New Zealand) Richard Swain (1999–2002)
- 681 (New Zealand) Matt Rua (1999–2001)
- 683 (New Zealand) Tasesa Lavea (2000–2001)
- 690 (New Zealand) Henry Perenara (2001)
- 679 (New Zealand) David Kidwell (2004–2006)
- 714 (New Zealand) Alex Chan (2004)
- 719 (New Zealand) Jake Webster (2005–2006)
- 732 (New Zealand) Adam Blair (2006, 2008–2010)
- 742 (New Zealand) Jeremy Smith (2007–2008)
- 743 (New Zealand) Jeff Lima (2007, 2009)
- 750 (New Zealand) Sika Manu (2008–2011)
- 765 (New Zealand) Matt Duffie (2011)
- 771 (New Zealand) Kevin Proctor (2012–2016)
- 775 (New Zealand) Jesse Bromwich (2012–2022)
- 778 (New Zealand) Tohu Harris (2013–2016)
- 796 (New Zealand) Kenny Bromwich (2016–2022)
- 804 (New Zealand) Nelson Asofa-Solomona (2017–2023, 2025)
- 816 (New Zealand) Brandon Smith (2018–2022)
- 819 (New Zealand) Jahrome Hughes (2019–2023, 2026)
- 837 (New Zealand) Will Warbrick (2024)

=== Niue ===
- (Niue) Kurt Bernard (2014)

=== Papua New Guinea ===
- 167 (Papua New Guinea) Marcus Bai (2000–2001)
- 176 (Papua New Guinea) John Wilshere (2000–2003)
- 230 (Papua New Guinea) Jay Aston (2008)
- (Papua New Guinea) Joe Bond (2009)
- 273 (Papua New Guinea) Justin Olam (2017–2022)
- 293 (Papua New Guinea) Zev John (2019)
- 289 (Papua New Guinea) Xavier Coates (2022)

=== Samoa ===
- (Samoa) Smith Samau (2006)
- (Samoa) Jeff Lima (2006)
- (Samoa) Willie Isa (2010)
- (Samoa) Junior Sa'u (2013)
- (Samoa) Junior Moors (2013)
- (Samoa) Young Tonumaipea (2014–2017, 2023)
- (Samoa) Ben Roberts (2014)
- (Samoa) Sam Kasiano (2018)
- (Samoa) Marion Seve (2019, 2023)
- (Samoa) Tino Faasuamaleaui (2019)
- (Samoa) Sualauvi Fa'alogo (2023, 2026)
- (Samoa) Shawn Blore (2024, 2026)
- (Samoa) Lazarus Vaalepu (2024)

=== Tonga ===
- (Tonga) Fifita Moala (2000)
- (Tonga) Antonio Kaufusi (2008)
- (Tonga) Pita Maile (2009)
- (Tonga) Mahe Fonua (2013–2015)
- (Tonga) Siosaia Vave (2013)
- (Tonga) Felise Kaufusi (2015–2017, 2022)
- (Tonga) Nafe Seluini (2016)
- (Tonga) Eliesa Katoa (2023–2025)
- (Tonga) Stefano Utoikamanu (2025–2026)

=== Vanuatu ===
- (Vanuatu) Justin O'Neill (2012)

=== Wales ===
- (Wales) Keith Mason (2002)

== International Nines ==
=== Australia ===
- (Australia) Josh Addo-Carr (2019)
- (Australia) Ryan Papenhuyzen (2019)
- (Australia) Curtis Scott (2019)

=== Fiji ===
- (Fiji) Suliasi Vunivalu (2019)
- (Fiji) Isaac Lumelume (2019)

=== Papua New Guinea ===
- (Papua New Guinea) Justin Olam (2019)

=== Samoa ===
- (Samoa) Tino Faasuamaleaui (2019)
- (Samoa) Marion Seve (2019)

== State Of Origin ==
=== Queensland Maroons ===
- 114 (Queensland) Russell Bawden (2000–2001)
- 140 (Queensland) Cameron Smith (2003–2017)
- 142 (Queensland) Billy Slater (2004–2005, 2008–2015, 2017–2018)
- 152 (Queensland) Greg Inglis (2006–2010)
- 156 (Queensland) Dallas Johnson (2006–2009)
- 163 (Queensland) Antonio Kaufusi (2007)
- 136 (Queensland) Michael Crocker (2008–2009)
- 164 (Queensland) Israel Folau (2008–2010)
- 168 (Queensland) Cooper Cronk (2010–2017)
- 171 (Queensland) Dane Nielsen (2011–2012)
- 179 (Queensland) Will Chambers (2014–2015, 2017–2019)
- 191 (Queensland) Tim Glasby (2017–2018)
- 192 (Queensland) Cameron Munster (2017–2023, 2025–2026)
- 195 (Queensland) Felise Kaufusi (2018–2022)
- 202 (Queensland) Christian Welch (2019–2021)
- 209 (Queensland) Tino Faasuamaleaui (2020)
- 216 (Queensland) Brenko Lee (2020)
- 217 (Queensland) Harry Grant (2021–2026)
- 205 (Queensland) Xavier Coates (2022–2025)
- 234 (Queensland) Trent Loiero (2025–2026)

=== New South Wales Blues ===
- 93 (New South Wales) Glenn Lazarus (1998)
- 144 (New South Wales) Rodney Howe (1998–2001)
- 147 (New South Wales) Robbie Kearns (1998, 2000–2001, 2003)
- 150 (New South Wales) Matt Geyer (1999)
- 152 (New South Wales) Robbie Ross (1999)
- 159 (New South Wales) Brett Kimmorley (2000)
- 162 (New South Wales) Scott Hill (2000, 2002)
- 195 (New South Wales) Matt King (2005–2007)
- 202 (New South Wales) Brett White (2007–2010)
- 207 (New South Wales) Ryan Hoffman (2007–2008, 2013–2014)
- 210 (New South Wales) Anthony Quinn (2008)
- 213 (New South Wales) Steve Turner (2008)
- 271 (New South Wales) Josh Addo-Carr (2018–2021)
- 287 (New South Wales) Dale Finucane (2019–2021)
- 307 (New South Wales) Stefano Utoikamanu (2025)

== City Vs Country Origin ==
=== NSW City ===
- (New South Wales) Matt Orford (2001, 2004)
- (New South Wales) Robbie Kearns (2003)
- (New South Wales) Matt Geyer (2006)
- (New South Wales) Ryan Hoffman (2006–2007, 2009–2010, 2013–2014)
- (New South Wales) Beau Champion (2011)
- (New South Wales) Josh Addo-Carr (2017)

=== NSW Country ===
- (New South Wales) Scott Hill (2001, 2004–2005)
- (New South Wales) Matt King (2004–2005)
- (New South Wales) Brett White (2006–2010)
- (New South Wales) Clint Newton (2007)
- (New South Wales) Anthony Quinn (2007–2008)
- (New South Wales) Ben Cross (2007)
- (New South Wales) Ryan Hinchcliffe (2011, 2015)
- (New South Wales) Dale Finucane (2015, 2016 & 2017)
- (New South Wales) Jordan McLean (2016)
- (New South Wales) Cheyse Blair (2017)

== All Stars Game ==
=== NRL All Stars ===
- 02 (Australia) Brett Finch (2010)
- 08 (New Zealand) Adam Blair (2010)
- 09 (Australia) Cameron Smith (2010, 2011, 2013)
- 38 (Australia) Cooper Cronk (2012)
- 47 (Vanuatu) Justin O'Neill (2013)
- 63 (New Zealand) Jesse Bromwich (2015)
- 84 (Australia) Jordan McLean (2017)

=== Indigenous All Stars ===
- 04 Beau Champion (2011)
- 37 Dane Nielsen (2012)
- 41 Will Chambers (2015, 2019)
- 64 Josh Addo-Carr (2019–2020)

=== Māori All Stars ===
- (Māori people) Kenny Bromwich (2019–2020)
- (Māori people) Jesse Bromwich (2019–2020)
- (Māori people) Jahrome Hughes (2019–2020, 2024)
- (Māori people) Brandon Smith (2019–2020)
- (Māori people) Nelson Asofa-Solomona (2021)
- (Māori people) Reimis Smith (2022)
- (Māori people) Jayden Nikorima (2022)
- (Māori people) Jack Howarth (2024)
- (Māori people) Will Warbrick (2025)
- (Māori people) Joe Chan (2026)
- (Māori people) Trent Toelau (2026)
- (Māori people) Manaia Waitere (2026)

== Other honours ==
=== Prime Minister's XIII ===
- (Australia) Will Chambers (2014)
- (Australia) Ryan Hoffman (2014)
- (Australia) Curtis Scott (2019)
- (Australia) Tino Faasuamaleaui (2019)
- (Australia) Josh King (2022)
- (Australia) Tyran Wishart (2024–2025)
- (Australia) Nick Meaney (2026)

=== New Zealand Māori ===
- (Māori people) Hep Cahill (2008)
- (Māori people) Kevin Proctor (2008, 2010)
- (Māori people) Kenny Bromwich (2014)

=== New South Wales Residents ===
All players were contracted with the Melbourne Storm while representing their New South Wales feeder club.

- Brett Anderson (2008)
- Hep Cahill (2009)
- James Maloney (2009)
- Ryan Tandy (2008)
- Aiden Guerra (2010)
- Rory Kostjasyn (2010)
- Gareth Widdop (2010)

=== Queensland Residents ===
All players were contracted with the Melbourne Storm while representing their Queensland feeder club.

- Anthony Bonus (1998)
- Daniel Frame (1999)
- Wade Fenton (1999)
- Steven Bell (2000)
- Jake Webster (2004)
- Jeremy Smith (2004–2005)
- Nathan Friend (2005)
- Robert Tanielu (2005)
- Jackson Nicolau (2006)
- Scott Anderson (2006)
- Cody Walker (2013)
- Tim Glasby (2013)
- Felise Kaufusi (2014)
- Shaun Nona (2015)
- Ben Hampton (2015)
- Kenny Bromwich (2015)
- Francis Tualau (2016)
- Jahrome Hughes (2017)
- Billy Walters (2017–2018)
- Dean Britt (2017–2018)
- Scott Drinkwater (2018)
- Patrick Kaufusi (2018)
- Tino Fa'asuamaleaui (2019)
- Darryn Schonig (2019)

== Junior Representatives ==
=== Junior Kangaroos ===
- (Australia) Brett O'Farrell (1998–1999)
- (Australia) Brad Watts (1999)
- (Australia) Dallas Johnson (2001)
- (Australia) Cameron Smith (2001–2002)
- (Australia) Antonio Kaufusi (2003)
- (Australia) Ryan Hoffman (2003)
- (Australia) Justin O'Neill (2010)
- (Australia) Ben Hampton (2012)
- (Australia) Mahe Fonua (2012)
- (Australia) Cameron Munster (2014)
- (Australia) Curtis Scott (2016–2019)
- (Australia) Brodie Croft (2017, 2019)
- (Australia) Tino Fa'asuamaleaui (2018–2019)
- (Australia) Louis Geraghty (2018)
- (Australia) Ryan Papenhuyzen (2019)

=== Junior Kiwis ===
- (New Zealand) Glen Turner (1998)
- (New Zealand) Marty Turner (2000)
- (New Zealand) Adam Blair (2002–2003)
- (New Zealand) Sam Tagataese (2005)
- (New Zealand) Sika Manu (2006)
- (New Zealand) Liam Foran (2007)
- (New Zealand) Kevin Proctor (2007)
- (New Zealand) Tohu Harris (2011–2012)
- (New Zealand) Kenny Bromwich (2011)
- (New Zealand) Nelson Asofa-Solomona (2014–2015)
- (New Zealand) Tony Tumusa (2015)
- (New Zealand) Brandon Smith (2016)
- (New Zealand) Kayleb Milne (2018)
- (New Zealand) Kelma Tuilagi (2018)

=== New South Wales U20 Origin ===
- 17 (New South Wales) Young Tonumaipea (2012)
- 18 (New South Wales) Dean Britt (2013–2014)
- 24 (New South Wales) Matthew Lodge (2013–2014)
- 37 (New South Wales) Rhys Kennedy (2014)
- 59 (New South Wales) Joe Stimson (2015)
- 71 (New South Wales) Curtis Scott (2016–2017)
- (New South Wales) Ryan Papenhuyzen (2018)

=== New South Wales U19 Origin ===
- (New South Wales) Jonah Pezet (2022)
- (New South Wales) Cooper Clarke (2025)

=== Queensland U20 Origin ===
- 04 (Queensland) Ben Hampton (2012)
- 08 (Queensland) Kurt Mann (2013)
- 35 (Queensland) Cameron Munster (2014)
- 37 (Queensland) Christian Welch (2014)
- 56 (Queensland) Brodie Croft (2016–2017)
- 57 (Queensland) Charlie Galo (2016)
- 59 (Queensland) Josh Kerr (2016)
- 67 (Queensland) Lachlan Timm (2016)
- 68 (Queensland) Jake Turpin (2016)
- 76 (Queensland) Harry Grant (2017–2018)
- 86 (Queensland) Tino Fa'asuamaleaui (2018–2019)
- 89 (Queensland) Louis Geraghty (2018)

=== Queensland U19 Origin ===
- (Queensland) Jack Howarth (2022)
- (Queensland) Mitchell Jennings (2023)
- (Queensland) Stanley Huen (2023–2024)
- (Queensland) Angus Hinchey(2023)
- (Queensland) Gabriel Satrick (2023)
- (Queensland) Jai Bowden (2025)
- (Queensland) Kobi Floro (2025)
- (Queensland) Alize Clarke (2026)
- (Queensland) Frank Howarth (2026)
- (Queensland) Joseph Litidamu (2026)
- (Queensland) Jett Ryan (2026)
- (Queensland) Hayden Watson (2026)

== Representative Captains ==
=== State of Origin Captains ===
Queensland

- (Australia) Cameron Smith (2008–2017)
- (Australia) Billy Slater (2018)
- (Australia) Cameron Munster (2025–2026)

New South Wales

- (Australia) Dale Finucane (Vice-captain: 2021)

Queensland U19s

- (Australia) Stanley Huen (2023–2024)

=== World Cup Captains ===
Australia

- (Australia) Cameron Smith (2013)
- (Australia) Cameron Smith (Vice-captain: 2008)

=== Test Captains ===
Australia

- (Australia) Cameron Smith (2007–2008, 2010–2013)
- (Australia) Cameron Smith (Vice-captain: 2009)
- (Australia) Harry Grant (2025)
- (Australia) Harry Grant (Vice-captain: 2024–2025)

New Zealand

- (New Zealand) Adam Blair (Vice-captain: 2009–2010)
- (New Zealand) Jesse Bromwich (2016, 2022)

Fiji

- (Fiji) Tui Kamikamica (2023–2025)

== Representative Coaching Staff ==
=== International ===
Australia

- (Australia) Chris Anderson (Coach: 1999–2001)
- (Australia) Craig Bellamy (Assistant coach: 2005–2007)

New Zealand

- 26 (New Zealand) Stephen Kearney (Coach: 2008–2011)

Samoa

- (Australia) Ryan Hinchcliffe (Assistant coach: 2025)

=== State Of Origin ===
New South Wales

- (New South Wales) Craig Bellamy (Coach: 2008–2010; Consultant: 2025)

=== City Vs Country Origin ===
NSW Country

- (New South Wales) Craig Bellamy (Coach: 2005–2007)
