= Gabriel Satrick =

Australian rugby league footballer

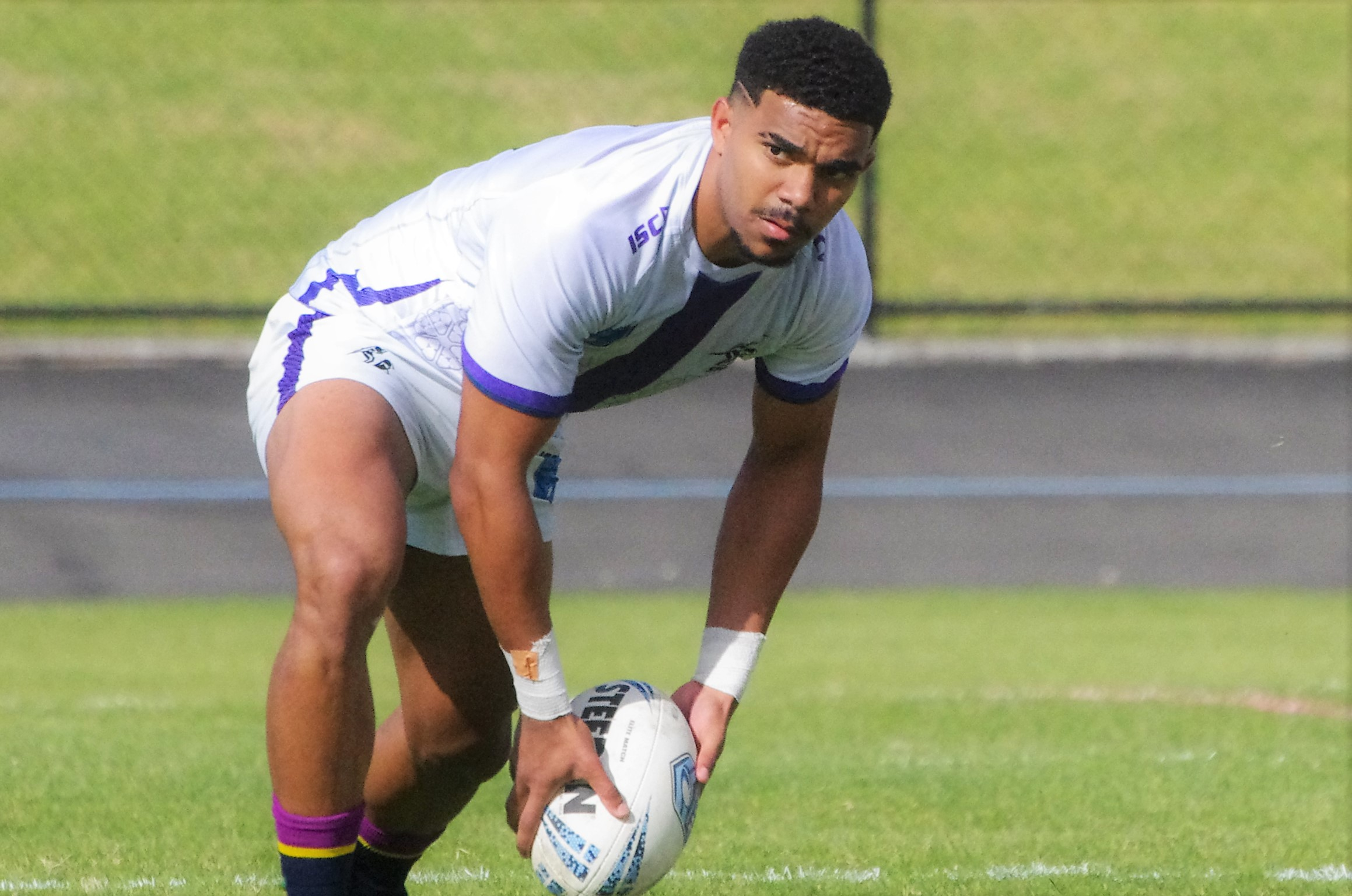

Personal information
- Full name: Gabriel Satrick
- Born: 23 December 2004 (age 21) Yarrabah, Queensland, Australia

Playing information
- Position: Hooker
Club
| Years | Team | Pld | T | G | FG | P |
|---|---|---|---|---|---|---|
| 2026– | Melbourne Storm | 1 | 0 | 0 | 0 | 0 |
- As of 25 October 2026

Gabriel Satrick (born 23 December 2004) is an Australian professional rugby league footballer who plays as a hooker for the Melbourne Storm in the National Rugby League (NRL).

== Background ==
A proud Dhuppi Warra-Ngarrabullgan and Torres Strait Islander descendant, the youngest of seven children, Satrick is from the indigenous community of Yarrabah in Far North Queensland.

He moved to Ipswich in 2021 to continue his schooling at Ipswich State High School (Ipswich SHS), when a close relative reached out to the rugby league team coaching staff at the school.

== Playing career ==
=== Early career ===
Originally a five-eighth or halfback when he played junior rugby league with the Yarrabah Seahawks, Satrick moved to the hooker role when relocated to Ipswich. He won the Peter Sterling Medal in 2022 while at Ipswich SHS, using his speed out of dummy-half to his advantage. He would be awarded the player of the match award in the 2022 Australian Secondary Schools Rugby League (ASSRL) grand final, playing for Queensland in their 32–18 win. Following that match, Satrick was selected in the Australian Schoolboys rugby league team team with his fellow Ipswich SHS teammate Josiah Pahulu.

During his time with Ipswich SHS, Satrick was scouted by the Melbourne Storm, signing a contract to join the club in August 2022. Satrick was a member of Ipswich SHS's 2022 Langer Cup win against Palm Beach Currumbin State High School, the first time the school had won that competition. Ipswich SHS would also win the Queensland schoolboys rugby league final, Satrick scoring a try in the Phil Hall Cup final against Ignatius Park College. In the NRL Schoolboys Cup national final, Satrick was a standout player again winning the player of the match award, scoring a try in Ipswich SHS's 32–6 win against Patrician Brothers' College, Fairfield.

Satrick would also play club junior rugby league in the Mal Meninga Cup for the Ipswich Jets during the 2023 season.

Following the completion of his high school education, Satrick joined the Melbourne Storm's academy, moving to Victoria.

Satrick represented Queensland under-19 rugby league team in 2023, selected to start on the interchange bench.

Having started with the team in 2023, he was a member of the Melbourne Storm's 2025 Jersey Flegg Cup winning team, starting at hooker in the club's 38–16 win over the Penrith Panthers in the Grand Final.

=== Melbourne Storm ===
During the 2026 NRL Pre-season Challenge, Satrick made his first senior rugby league appearance, playing for the Melbourne Storm in a match against the Canberra Raiders.

Satrick made his NRL debut in round 12 of the 2026 NRL season, playing 25 minutes at dummy-half after coming from the interchange bench. Satrick making 12 tackles in the match, with over 50 family members in attendance, with a watch party organised at Yarrabah's Bishop Malcolm Park for his local community.

Following his debut, he signed a contract extension with the Storm until the end of the 2028 NRL season.

Melbourne's 2026 Indigenous Round jersey pays tribute to Satrick's journey to the NRL, with the design by artist Edna Ambrym in conjunction with Satrick's mother Celestine, featuring images and totems representing Satrick and the Yarrabah community.

== Honours ==
Individual

- 2022 Peter Sterling Medal

Club

- Melbourne Storm: 2025 Jersey Flegg Cup Winners

Representative

- 2022 Australian Schoolboys rugby league team representative
- 2023 U19s State of Origin Queensland representative
