= Leo Clarke (rugby league) =

Australian rugby league footballer

Personal information
- Born: 3 April 1978 (age 47)

Playing information
- Position: Wing, Centre, Second-row
Club
Years	Team	Pld	T	G	FG	P
1998–99	Western Suburbs	8	1	0	0	4
2002	St George Illawarra	4	1	4	0	12
	Total	12	2	4	0	16
- Source: As of 8 January 2020

Leo Clarke (born 3 April 1978) is an Australian former professional rugby league footballer who played in the 1990s and 2000s. A goal kicking outside back he played in the National Rugby League for the St. George Illawarra Dragons and the Western Suburbs Magpies. Clarke is of Māori descent. He has been a Junior Pathways coach since 2010 for the South West Sydney Academy of Sport, Western Suburbs Magpies, Canterbury Bankstown Bulldogs and the Penrith Panthers. Clarke has also coached the under 18’s Men’s team with the NSW Māori Rugby League. Leo Clarke is the father of rising stars Zakauri Clarke who is contracted with the Penrith Panthers and Cooper Clarke who is contracted with the Melbourne Storm. Both are highly touted to be regular NRL players.

== Playing career ==
Clarke made his first grade debut for Western Suburbs in round 6 of the 1998 NRL season against South Sydney, which ended in a 41–10 loss at the Sydney Football Stadium. He made one further appearance for Wests; the club finished last on the table and his season ended prematurely due to injury.

The following year, Clarke played six games for Western Suburbs which finished last on the table in their final year in the NRL. At the conclusion of the 1999 NRL season, Western Suburbs merged with fellow foundation club Balmain to form the Wests Tigers as part of the NRL's rationalization policy. Clarke was not offered a contract to play for the newly formed club the Wests Tigers.

In the 2000 NRL season, Clarke joined St. George Illawarra and played in the first division team. In 2001, he won the highest try scorer and highest point scorer of the first division completion. Clarke was a valued member and a try scorer in the club's first division grand final winning team. In 2002, he played four games for St. George Illawarra, including both final matches against Newcastle and Cronulla-Sutherland. A renowned try scorer and accomplished goal kicker, Clarke was forced to retire after the completion of the 2002 season due to injury, at age 24.
