= Cooper Clarke =

Australian rugby league footballer

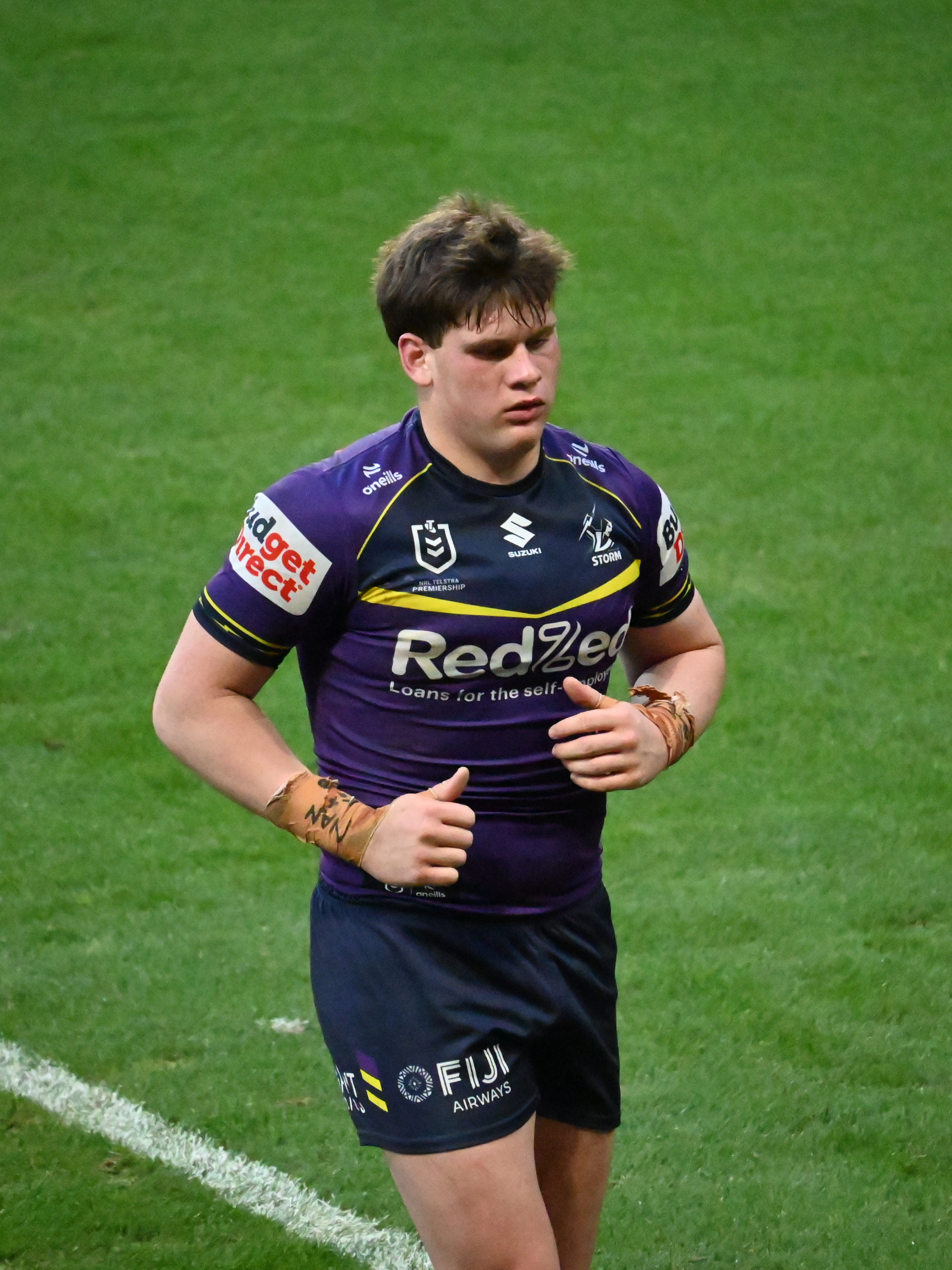

Personal information
- Full name: Cooper Clarke
- Born: 17 July 2006 (age 20) Campbelltown, New South Wales, Australia
- Height: 188 cm (6 ft 2 in)
- Weight: 110 kg (17 st 5 lb)

Playing information
- Position: Prop, Lock, Second-row
Club
Years	Team	Pld	T	G	FG	P
2026–	Melbourne Storm	24	2	0	0	8
- Source: As of 18 November 2026
- Father: Leo Clarke
- Relatives: Zakauri Clarke (brother)

Cooper Clarke (born 17 July 2006) is an Australian professional rugby league footballer who plays as a second-row or prop forward for the Melbourne Storm in the National Rugby League (NRL).

== Background ==
Clarke was born in Campbelltown, New South Wales, and is of Māori descent through his father, former NRL player Leo Clarke.

He is the brother of Penrith Panthers forward Zakauri Clarke.

== Playing career ==
=== Early career ===
Clarke played his junior rugby league for the Eagle Vale St Andrews and Ingleburn Tigers, before joining the Western Suburbs Magpies pathways system, playing in the Magpies Harold Matthews Cup squad in 2023. Initially Clarke struggled with motivation at the Magpies and did not receive much game time. He was knocked back for trials with both the Canterbury-Bankstown Bulldogs and St. George Illawarra Dragons junior representative teams during this time.

Clarke attended St Gregory's College, Campbelltown before relocating to the Sunshine Coast, Queensland, where he completed his schooling at Caloundra State High School after joining the Melbourne Storm Academy. Playing with the Sunshine Coast Falcons in the Queensland Rugby League's Mal Meninga Cup, Clarke was voted by fans as the competition's "Weapon of the Year" in 2024. He was described by Falcons coach Cam Boaza as "a fantastic young fella, hard worker, and a genuinely nice kid."

During the 2025 season, Clarke represented New South Wales Under-19s and was named as the Melbourne Storm's S.G. Ball Cup Player of the Year. He was a member of the Melbourne Storm's 2025 Jersey Flegg Cup winning team, scoring a try in the club's 38–16 win over the Penrith Panthers in the Grand Final.

=== Melbourne Storm ===
After impressing coaches and teammates during preseason training, Clarke made his NRL debut in round 1 of the 2026 NRL season against the Parramatta Eels.

Quickly maturing on the field, on 1 April 2026, Melbourne Storm announced that Clarke had signed a contract extension until the end of the 2029 season. On 18 November 2026, the Storm announced further 3 years were added to Clarke's contract signing him on until the end of 2032.

== Honours ==
Individual

- Melbourne Storm Greg Brentnall SG Ball U19s Player of the Year: 2025
- Melbourne Storm Billy Slater Rookie of the Year: 2026
- RLPA Rookie of the Year: 2026

Club

- 2025 Jersey Flegg Cup Winners

Representative

- 2025 U19s State of Origin NSW representative

== Career statistics ==
†	Denotes seasons in which Clarke won the Premiership

Junior league statistics
Season	Team	Competition	App	T	G	GK %	FG	Pts
2023	Western Suburbs Magpies	Harold Matthews Cup	7	2	0	—N/a	0	8
2024	Sunshine Coast Falcons	Mal Meninga Cup	9	3	0	—N/a	0	12
2025	Melbourne Storm	SG Ball Cup	11	9	0	—N/a	0	36
2025†	Melbourne Storm	Jersey Flegg Cup	14	3	0	—N/a	0	12

NRL statistics
Season	Team	App	T	G	GK %	FG	Pts
2026	Melbourne Storm	24	2	0	—N/a	0	8
2027	Melbourne Storm						
	Totals	24	2				9
