= Hayden Watson =

Australian rugby league footballer (born 2007)

Personal information
- Born: 1 March 2007 (age 19) Geelong, Victoria, Australia

Playing information
- Position: Halfback
Club
Years	Team	Pld	T	G	FG	P
2026–	Melbourne Storm	2	1	0	0	4
- Source: RLP

Hayden Watson (born 1 March 2007) is an Australian rugby league footballer for the Melbourne Storm in the National Rugby League (NRL).

== Early life ==
Watson was born in Geelong, Victoria, and educated in Queensland, attending Marsden State High School (Marsden SHS). Watson's family moved to Queensland when he was four years old and he played some junior rugby league with the Coomera Cutters.

== Career ==
=== Early career ===
At junior level, Watson was a member of the Beaudesert Kingfishers team that made the Gold Coast rugby league under-15s grand final in 2022, and was one of a number of teammates selected in the under-16s squad for the Tweed Heads Seagulls in the Cyril Connell Challenge representative team for the 2023 season. Playing as a hooker, Watson was mentored by former South Sydney Rabbitohs player Isaac Luke while at Marsden SHS. Watson was described by coach Neil Richards as "quiet but has all the skills in the word and a really good football game. He'll be a nine for us, but with the rotation (of hookers we have) he can play in the halves and at fullback. He has a really good football brain. We've been fortunate for Issac to work with him, he'll get some one-on-one (coaching)."

While at Marsden SHS, Watson was a key member of the team that advanced to the 2023 Allan Langer Trophy reserve grade grand final where Marsden SHS was defeated 22–16 by Ipswich State High School. Watson setting up a try in that match.

Watson was signed by the Melbourne Storm to their academy program in 2023, training with the Brisbane Tigers once a week.

He would transfer from the Tweed Seagulls to join the Burleigh Bears in the Cyril Connell Challenge in 2024, also representing City in the annual under-17s City versus Country match. Watson was then named in the competition's team of the season.

Moving up to the under-19s Mal Meninga Cup, Watson "shone in his debut", staying in the team that lost the 2024 grand final against his former team Tweed.

In 2024, at schoolboys level, Watson helped Marsden SHS reach the grand final of the first grade Allan Langer Trophy, but again he was on the losing side, this time against Palm Beach Currumbin State High School.

In 2025, Watson scored a try for Burleigh Bears in the Mal Meninga Cup grand final against the Redcliffe Dolphins, helping the Bears to a 18–14 win in extra time. He was named to the Queensland Schoolboys team for the second successive year leading them to the under-18 national title against the New South Wales Combined Catholic Colleges, scoring a try and winning the player of the final award in Queensland's 22–10 win. Following that carnival, he was selected in the squad for the Australian Schoolboys rugby league team. Watson also played for Queensland in their 23–22 under-19s State of Origin win against New South Wales at Sunshine Coast Stadium.

In his final year at Marsden SHS, Watson was hailed by The Courier-Mail as "the best school-age footballer across the year," and named in the Langer Trophy team of the year.

=== Melbourne Storm ===
Moving to Melbourne in 2026, Watson started the season in the Melbourne Storm S. G. Ball Cup squad and captained that year's Queensland under-19s Station of Origin team, earning player of the match honours. He finished the season as Melbourne's NSW Cup halfback and also featured twice in first-grade deputising for an injured Jahrome Hughes.After seven NSW Cup matches, Watson made his NRL debut against the Canterbury-Bankstown Bulldogs in round 22 of the 2026 NRL season, coming off the interchange bench. He would start his first NRL match at halfback in Melbourne's match the following week against the Manly Warringah Sea Eagles, scoring a solo try.

After signing a contract extension during the year, Watson is set to remain with the Storm until the end of the 2030 season. On 18 November 2026, the Storm announced Watson had a further two years added to his contract keeping him at the club until the end of 2032.

== Honours and achievements ==
Melbourne Storm

- Greg Brentnall U19s Player of the Year: 2026
- Melbourne Storm Academy Player of the Year: 2026

Burleigh Bears

- Mal Meninga Cup champions: 2025

Representative

- Queensland Schoolboys: 2024, 2025
- Queensland Under-19s State of Origin: 2025, 2026
- Australian Schoolboys: 2025
