= Oryn Keeley =

Australian rugby league player

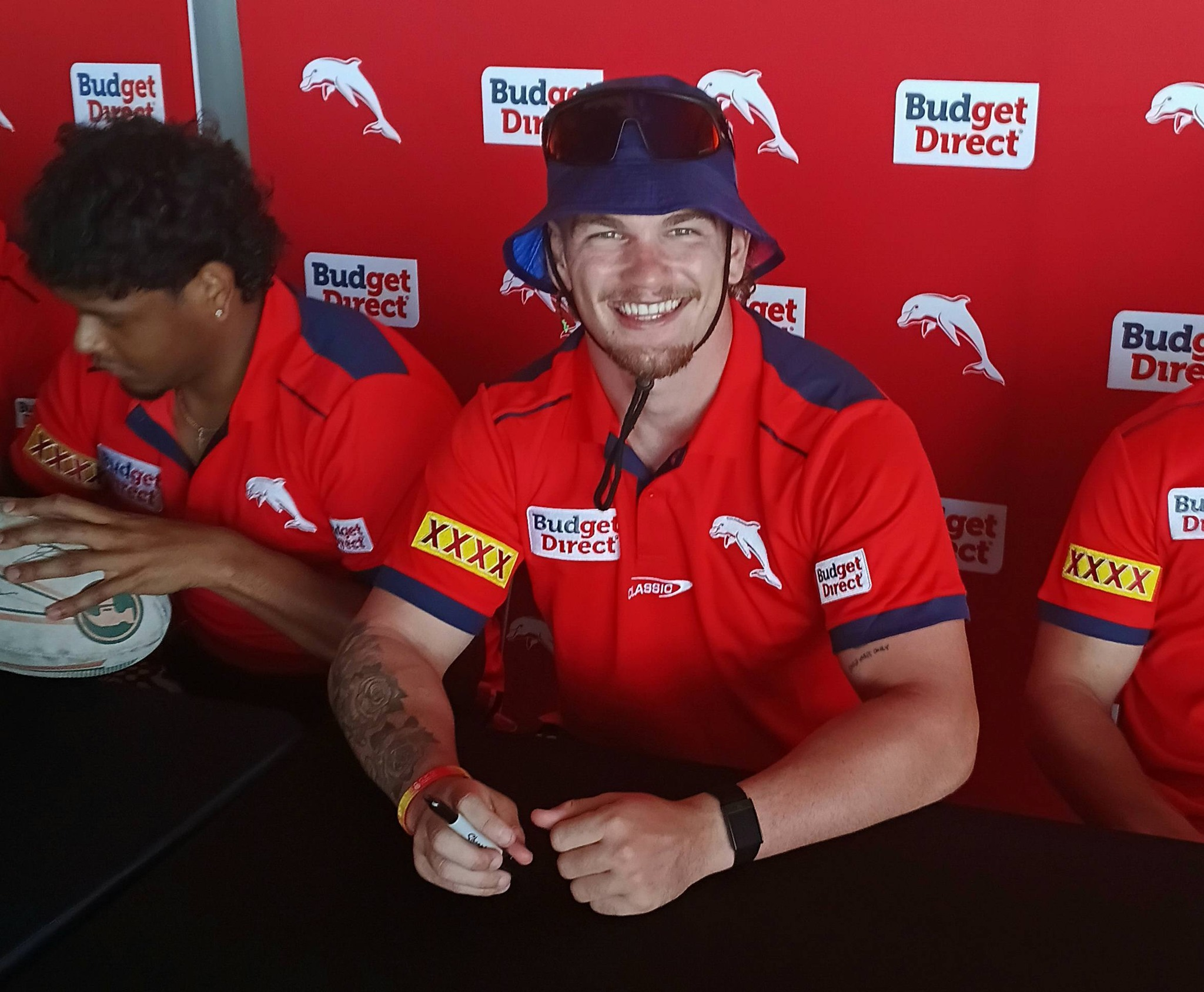

Personal information
- Born: 13 January 2003 (age 23) Gosford, New South Wales, Australia
- Height: 187 cm (6 ft 2 in)
- Weight: 98 kg (15 st 6 lb)

Playing information
- Position: Second-row
Club
Years	Team	Pld	T	G	FG	P
2022–23	Newcastle Knights	2	0	0	0	0
2024–26	Dolphins	28	5	0	0	20
2026–	Melbourne Storm	8	2	0	0	8
	Total	38	7	0	0	28
- Source: As of 5 September 2026

Oryn Keeley (born 13 January 2003) is an Australian professional rugby league footballer who plays as a second-row forward for the Melbourne Storm in the National Rugby League (NRL). He previously played for the Newcastle Knights and Dolphins.

== Background ==
Born in Gosford, New South Wales, Keeley played his junior rugby league for the Northern Lakes Warriors and The Entrance Tigers, before being signed by the Newcastle Knights.

== Playing career ==
=== Early years ===
Keeley played for the Newcastle Knights in their Harold Matthews Cup team in 2019 and the S. G. Ball Cup side from 2020 to 2022.

=== Newcastle Knights (2022-23) ===
In 2022, Keeley played for the Newcastle Knights' Jersey Flegg Cup team and represented the New South Wales under-19s team. In round 23 of the 2022 NRL season, he made his NRL debut with Newcastle against the Canberra Raiders in the Knights' 22–28 loss at McDonald Jones Stadium. This was his only NRL game for that season. In 2023, Keeley featured in only one NRL match for the Knights in 2023.

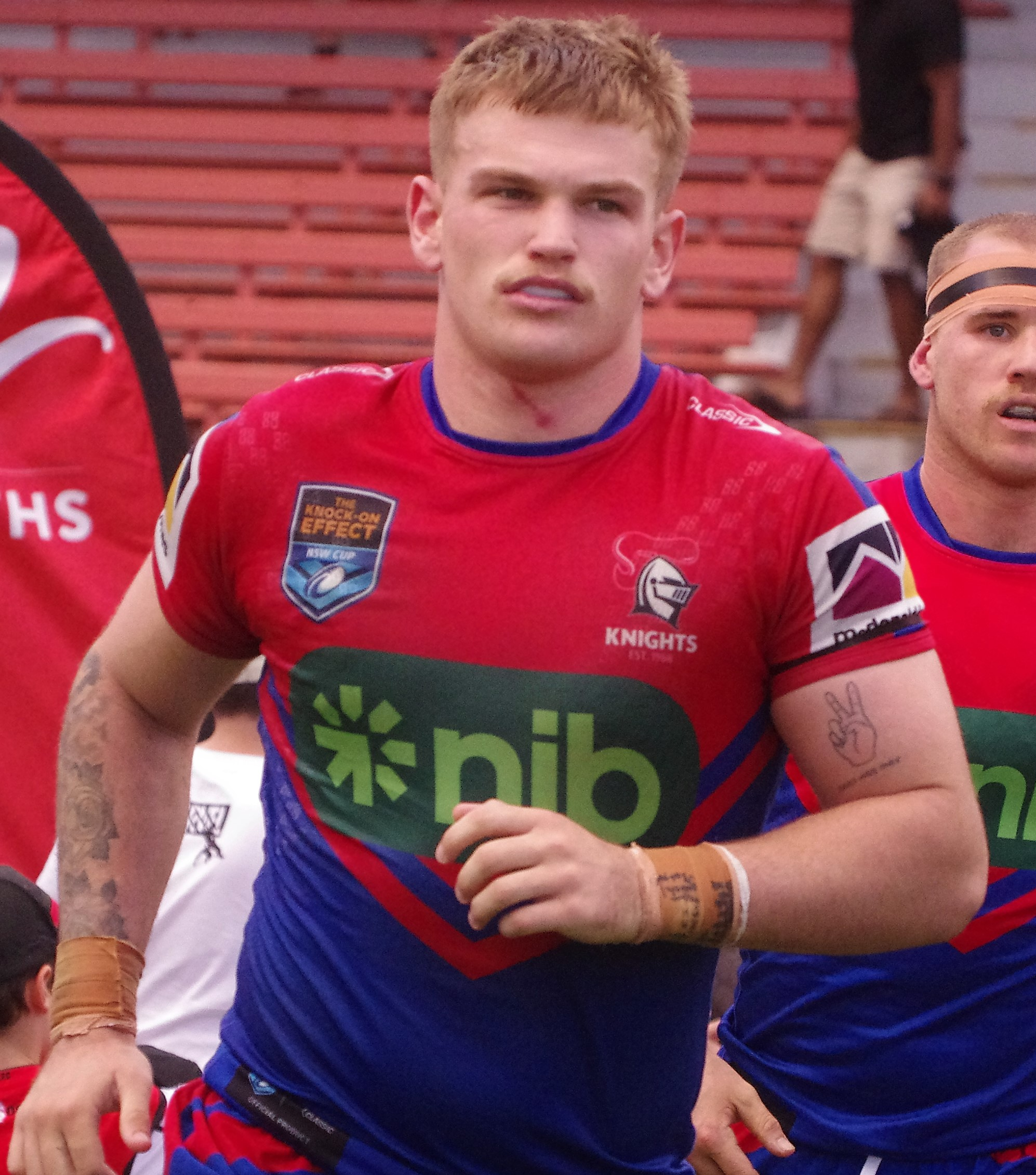
Keeley in 2023

=== Dolphins (2024-26) ===
Keeley signed a three-year contract with the Dolphins for 2024 onwards, after being released from the final two years of his Knights contract in October 2023. Keeley made his club debut for the Dolphins in round 7 of the 2024 season, coming off the bench.

After the NRL season Keeley won the Queensland Cup starting in the second row for the Norths Devils in the grand final against the Redcliffe Dolphins. Two weeks later he scored two tries in a man of the match performance as Norths beat the Newtown Jets to win the NRL State Championship. Keeley played sixteen games for the Dolphins in the 2025 NRL season as the club narrowly missed out on the finals finishing 9th. On 10 December 2025, the Storm announced that they had signed Keeley from the 2027 season onward. On 29 June 2026, Keeley joined the Melbourne Storm with immediate effect after the Dolphins granted him an early release for his contract.
