= Hugo Peel =

Australian rugby league footballer (born 2005)

Personal information
- Born: 5 January 2005 (age 21)

Playing information
- Position: Fullback, Wing
Club
Years	Team	Pld	T	G	FG	P
2026–	Melbourne Storm	3	1	0	0	4
- Source: RLP

Hugo Peel (born 5 January 2005) is an Australian rugby league footballer for the Melbourne Storm in the National Rugby League (NRL).

Peel was raised in Melbourne and played schoolboy rugby union during his time at St Kevin's College, which he captained to a premiership in 2023. His rugby league experience was limited to touch football and it was while playing that sport he was scouted by the Storm.

Primarily a fullback, Peel was the "2024 Junior Representatives Player of the Year" for the Storm and the following season scored two tries in their Jersey Flegg Cup grand final win over the Penrith Panthers.

Peel travelled to Ireland at the end of 2025 to train with professional rugby union team Leinster, as part of an exchange program, before making his NSW Cup debut in the 2026 season. He called up by Craig Bellamy after six matches, featuring on a wing against the Dolphins at Suncorp, to become only the club's seventh Victorian-produced junior to advance into first-grade.
