= Preston Conn =

Australian rugby league footballer (born 2004)

Personal information
- Born: 30 June 2004 (age 22)

Playing information
- Position: Second-row
Club
Years	Team	Pld	T	G	FG	P
2026	Melbourne Storm	1	0	0	0	0
- Source: RLP

Preston Conn (born 30 June 2004) is an Australian rugby league footballer for the Melbourne Storm in the National Rugby League (NRL).

== Early life ==
Conn attended Callaghan College in Newcastle.

== Career ==
A second-rower, Conn was a Western Suburbs (Newcastle) junior and played in the Harold Matthews Cup for the Newcastle Knights before joining Melbourne.

Conn joined the Storm at the end of 2023 and had a standout season for the club as a premiership-winning captain of their 2025 Jersey Flegg Cup side, earning the competition's player of the year award. After gaining a Storm contract in 2025, Conn made his first-grade debut in the opening round of the 2026 NRL season, coming on off the bench in a win over the Parramatta Eels at AAMI Park.
