= Siulagi Tuimalatu-Brown =

Melbourne Born & raised rugby league footballer

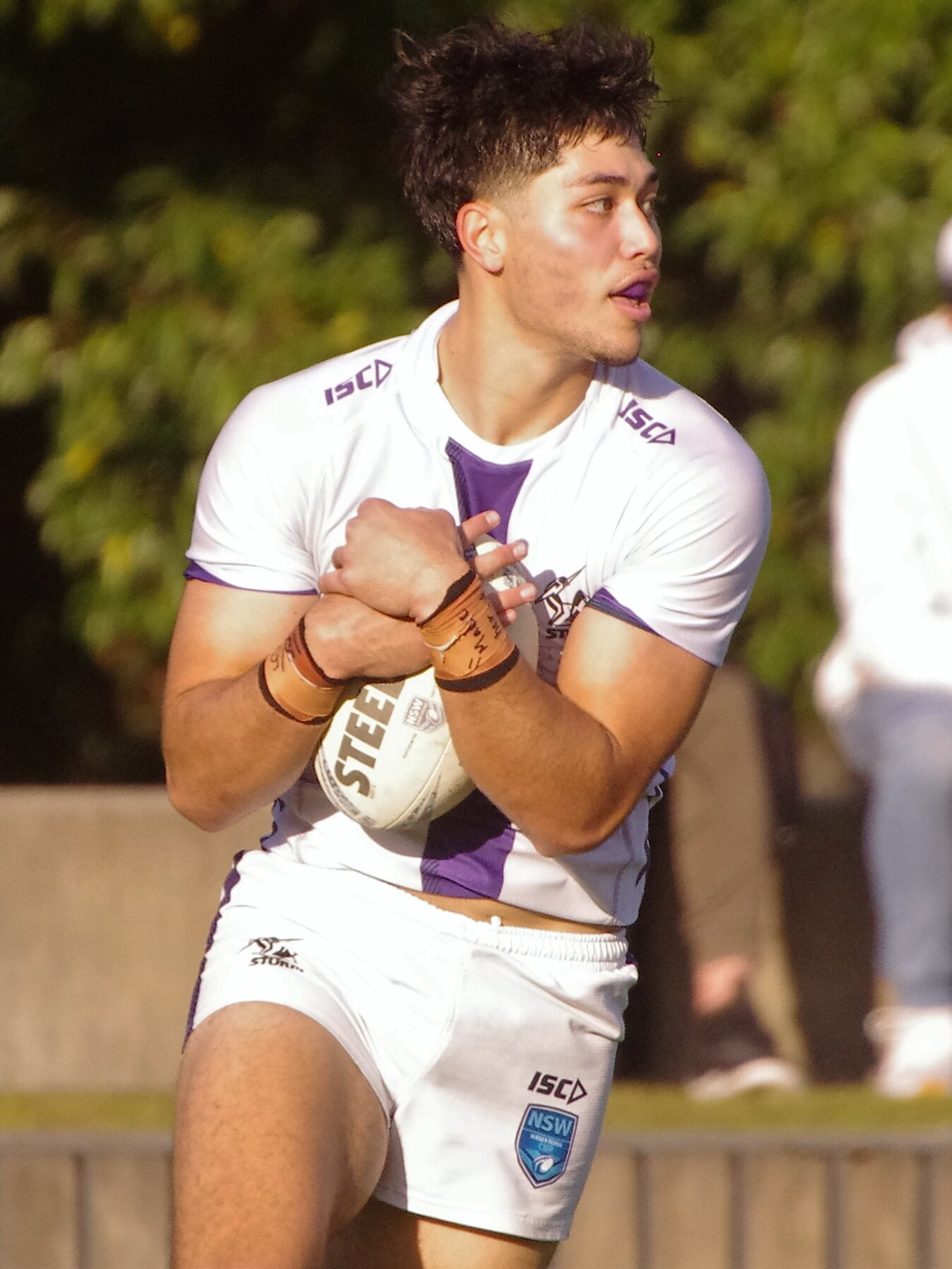

Personal information
- Full name: Siulagi Tuimalatu-Brown
- Born: Siulagi Pio; 21 February 2004 (age 22) Melbourne
- Height: 193 cm (6 ft 4 in)

Playing information
- Position: Wing
Club
Years	Team	Pld	T	G	FG	P
2025–	Melbourne Storm	13	6	0	0	24
- Source: As of 6 November 2026

Siulagi Tuimalatu-Brown (born 21 February 2004) is an Australian professional rugby league footballer who plays as a winger for the Melbourne Storm in the National Rugby League and NSW Cup.

He was previously known as Siulagi Pio until 2025.

== Background ==
Tuimalatu-Brown played his junior football for the Northern Thunder, then Altona Roosters. He made his way through the Melbourne Storm pathway system. He was a part of the Storm team that won the 2025 Jersey Flegg premiership. Tuimalatu-Brown is the brother-in-law of former Storm teammate, Marion Seve.

== Career ==
In July 2025, Tuimalatu-Brown made his NRL debut for Melbourne against the North Queensland Cowboys at Queensland Country Bank Stadium in round 18 of the 2025 NRL season. He was the sixth Victorian to represent the club at NRL level. He played 12 games for Melbourne in the 2026 NRL season as the club finished 10th on the table, missing the finals for the first time since 2010.
