= Davvy Moale =

Cook Islands international rugby league footballer

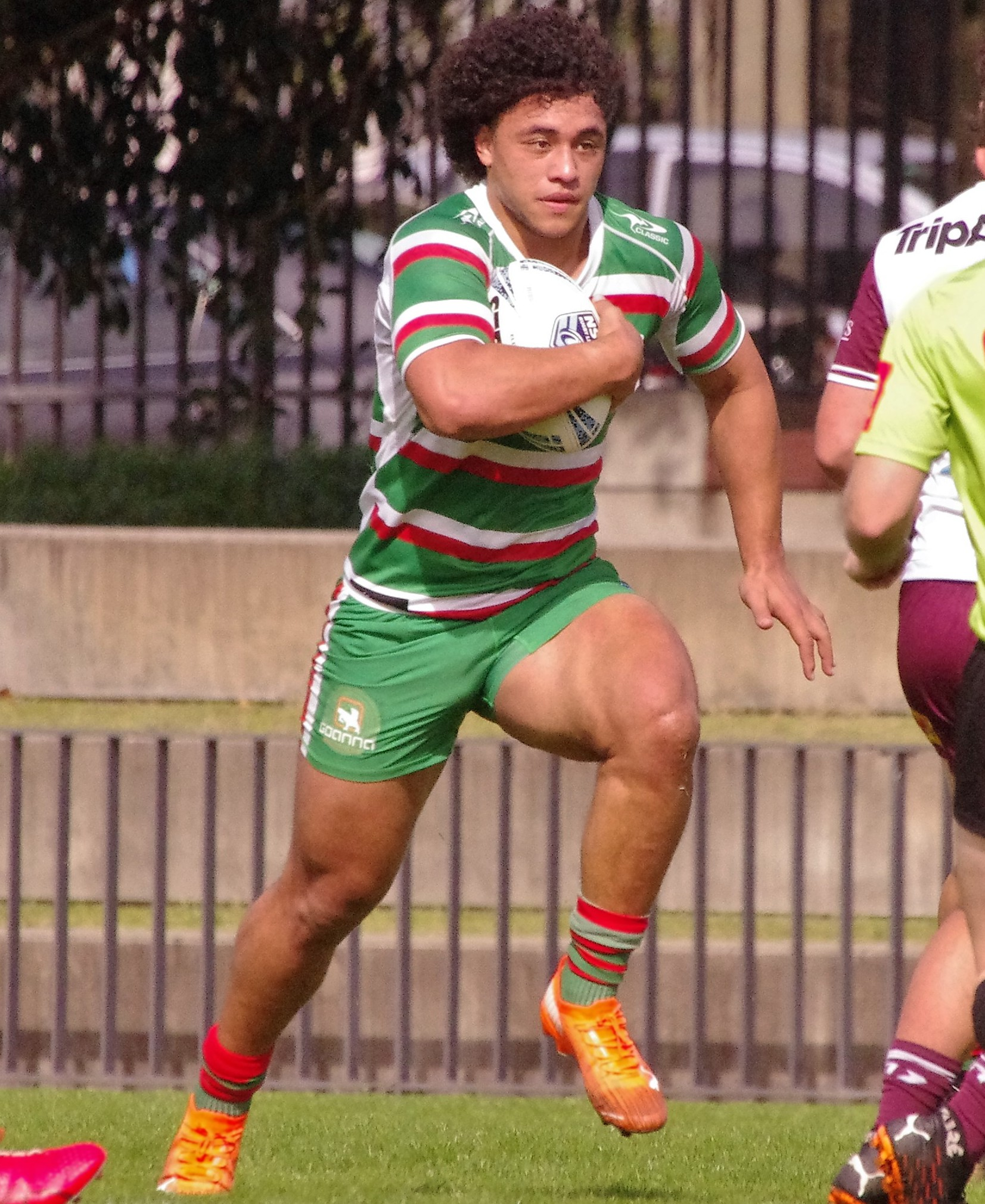

Personal information
- Full name: Davvy Moale
- Born: 23 March 2003 (age 23) Christchurch, New Zealand
- Height: 186 cm (6 ft 1 in)
- Weight: 112 kg (17 st 9 lb)

Playing information
- Position: Prop
Club
| Years | Team | Pld | T | G | FG | P |
|---|---|---|---|---|---|---|
| 2021–25 | South Sydney | 70 | 5 | 0 | 0 | 20 |
| 2026 | Melbourne Storm | 10 | 0 | 0 | 0 | 0 |
| 2027– | Manly Sea Eagles | 0 | 0 | 0 | 0 | 0 |
| | Total | 80 | 5 | 0 | 0 | 20 |
Representative
| Years | Team | Pld | T | G | FG | P |
| 2022– | Cook Islands | 12 | 5 | 0 | 0 | 20 |
- Source: As of 6 November 2026

Davvy Moale (born 23 March 2003) is a Cook Islands international rugby league footballer who plays as a prop for the Manly Sea Eagles in the NRL.

== Playing career ==
In round 20 of the 2021 NRL season, Moale made his debut for South Sydney against the St. George Illawarra Dragons at Suncorp Stadium in a 50–14 win. In the 2022 NRL season, Moale played 12 games for the club but did not feature in their finals campaign. In the 2023 NRL season, Moale played 17 matches for South Sydney as they finished 9th. On 23 October 2024, Moale was named to play in the Cook Islands team for the Pacific Championships. On 22 July 2025, it was announced that Moale would miss the rest of the 2025 NRL season after suffering a wrist injury. On 23 September it was reported that Moale had signed a deal with the Manly Warringah Sea Eagles from 2027 onwards. On 25 September Manly confirmed that they had signed Moale on a three year deal starting in 2027.

On 19 December 2025, Melbourne announced that they had signed Moale for the 2026 season. Moale played ten games for Melbourne in the 2026 NRL season as the club finished 10th on the table, missing the finals for the first time since 2010.

== Statistics ==
| Year | Team | Games | Tries | Pts |
|---|---|---|---|---|
| 2021 | South Sydney Rabbitohs | 2 | | |
| 2022 | South Sydney Rabbitohs | 12 | | |
| 2023 | South Sydney Rabbitohs | 17 | | |
| 2024 | South Sydney Rabbitohs | 23 | 3 | 12 |
| 2025 | South Sydney Rabbitohs | 16 | 2 | 8 |
| 2026 | Melbourne Storm | 10 | | |
| 2027 | Manly Warringah Sea Eagles | | | |
| | Totals | 80 | 5 | 20 |
