= Manaia Waitere =

New Zealand rugby league player

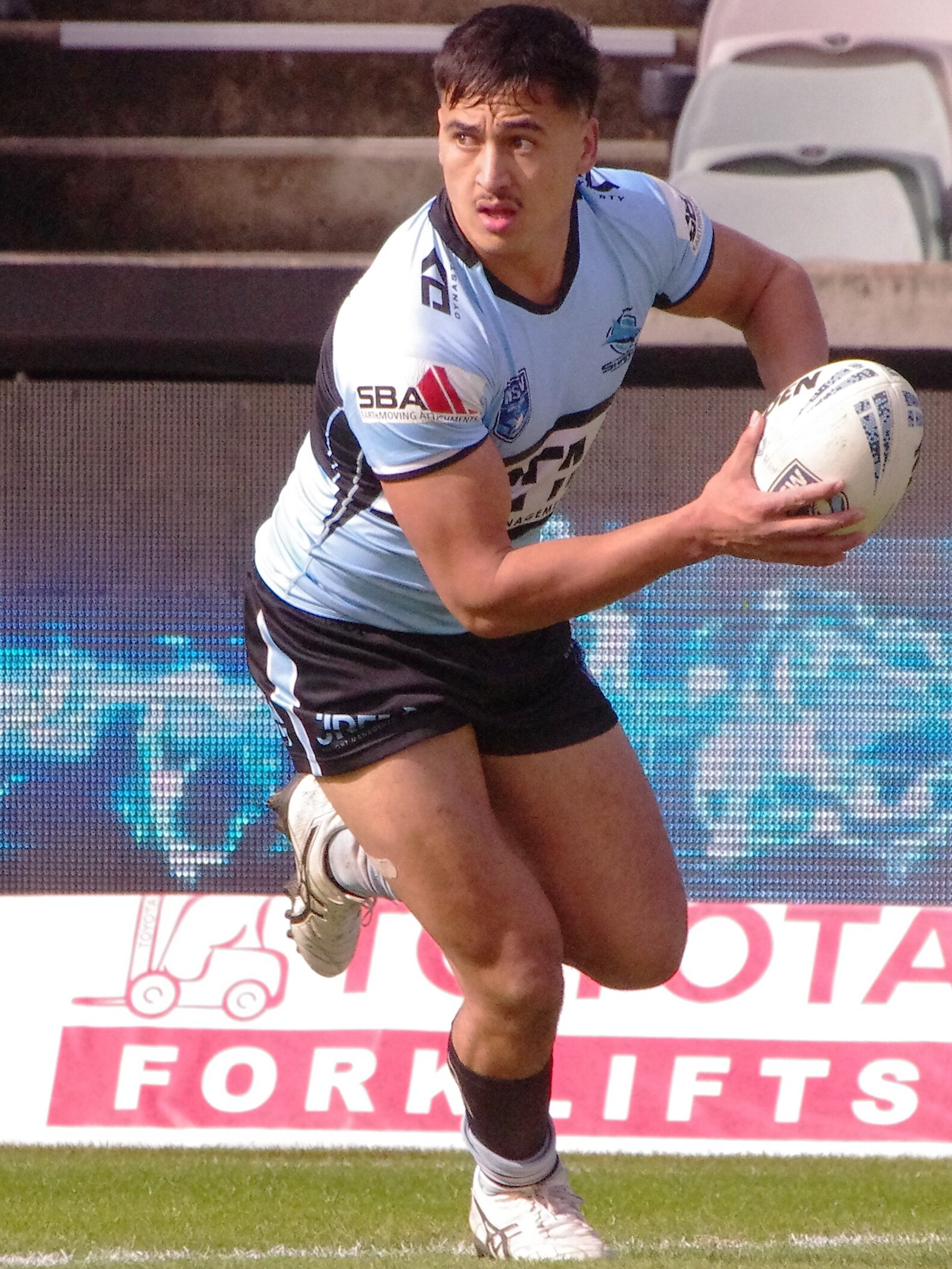

Personal information
- Full name: Manaia Waitere
- Born: 2 January 2002 (age 24) Hastings, New Zealand
- Height: 183 cm (6 ft 0 in)
- Weight: 93 kg (14 st 9 lb)

Playing information
- Position: Centre, Five-eighth
Club
Years	Team	Pld	T	G	FG	P
2025	Canberra Raiders	1	0	0	0	0
2026–	Melbourne Storm	8	2	0	0	8
	Total	9	2	0	0	8
- Source: As of 1 August 2026

Manaia Waitere (born 2 January 2002) is a New Zealand rugby league footballer who plays as a centre for the Melbourne Storm in the National Rugby League (NRL).

He previously played with the Canberra Raiders.

== Background ==
Born in New Zealand, Waitere played his junior football for the Como Crocs while attending Endeavour Sports High. He was signed by the Cronulla Sharks, playing for the Jersey Flegg team from 2021 to 2023. In 2024, Waitere signed for the Canberra Raiders.

== Career ==
In round 27 2025, Waitere made his NRL debut for Canberra against the Dolphins at Kayo Stadium. He started at Centre in a 62-24 loss.

In late 2025, Waitere was released by the Raiders, signing a one year contract with the Melbourne Storm ahead of the 2026 NRL season.
