= Angus Hinchey =

Australian rugby league footballer

Personal information
- Full name: Angus Hinchey
- Born: 20 August 2004 (age 22) Brisbane, Queensland, Australia

Playing information
- Position: Lock, Second-row
Club
Years	Team	Pld	T	G	FG	P
2026–	Melbourne Storm	6	1	1	0	6
- Source: As of 25 October 2026

Angus Hinchey (born 20 August 2004) is a professional rugby league footballer who plays as a second-row and lock for the Melbourne Storm in the NSW Cup and the National Rugby League (NRL).

== Background ==
Hinchey was born and raised in Brisbane, Queensland. He was educated firstly at Ashgrove State School, then at The Gap State High School. He is the son of former South Sydney Rabbitohs and Parramatta Eels forward James Hinchey.

== Playing career ==
=== Early career ===
Hinchey first began playing at age five for the Redcliffe Dolphins. Growing up in Brisbane, he played junior football for the Wests Michelton, the Wests Panthers and was selected for development programs out of the Wests Brisbane Junior system.

At age 16, he transitioned to the Brisbane Norths Devils, competing in the Under-18 Mal Meninga Cup during the 2021 and 2022 seasons and represented Queensland in 2023 Under-19s State of Origin match.

=== Melbourne Storm ===
Hinchey was signed to a development contract with the Melbourne Storm academy, making him part of a hand-picked cohort of external junior athletes. The group began joint pre-season training alongside the senior NRL squad, playing in the Under-21 Jersey Flegg Cup.

He would make his senior debut for Melbourne during the 2024 NRL Pre-season Challenge, also playing a handful of matches in the Queensland Cup for then Storm affiliate club Brisbane Tigers during the 2024 season.

Young enough to still play in the Jersey Flegg Cup competition, Hinchey was a member of the Melbourne Storm team that won the Grand Final 38–16 against the Penrith Panthers.

After transitioning to the club's NSW Cup team in 2026, Hinchey earned a spot on the Storm's NRL first grade team and debuted in round 2 of the 2026 NRL season against the St. George Illawarra Dragons. On 31 July 2026, Hinchey scored his first ever first-grade try against the Canterbury-Bankstown Bulldogs.

== Honours ==
Individual

- Melbourne Storm: Darren Bell Medal (Jersey Flegg Cup U21s Player of the Year): 2024

Club

- Melbourne Storm: 2025 Jersey Flegg Cup Winners

Representative

- 2023 U19s State of Origin Queensland representative
