= Stanley Huen =

Australian rugby league footballer (born 2005)

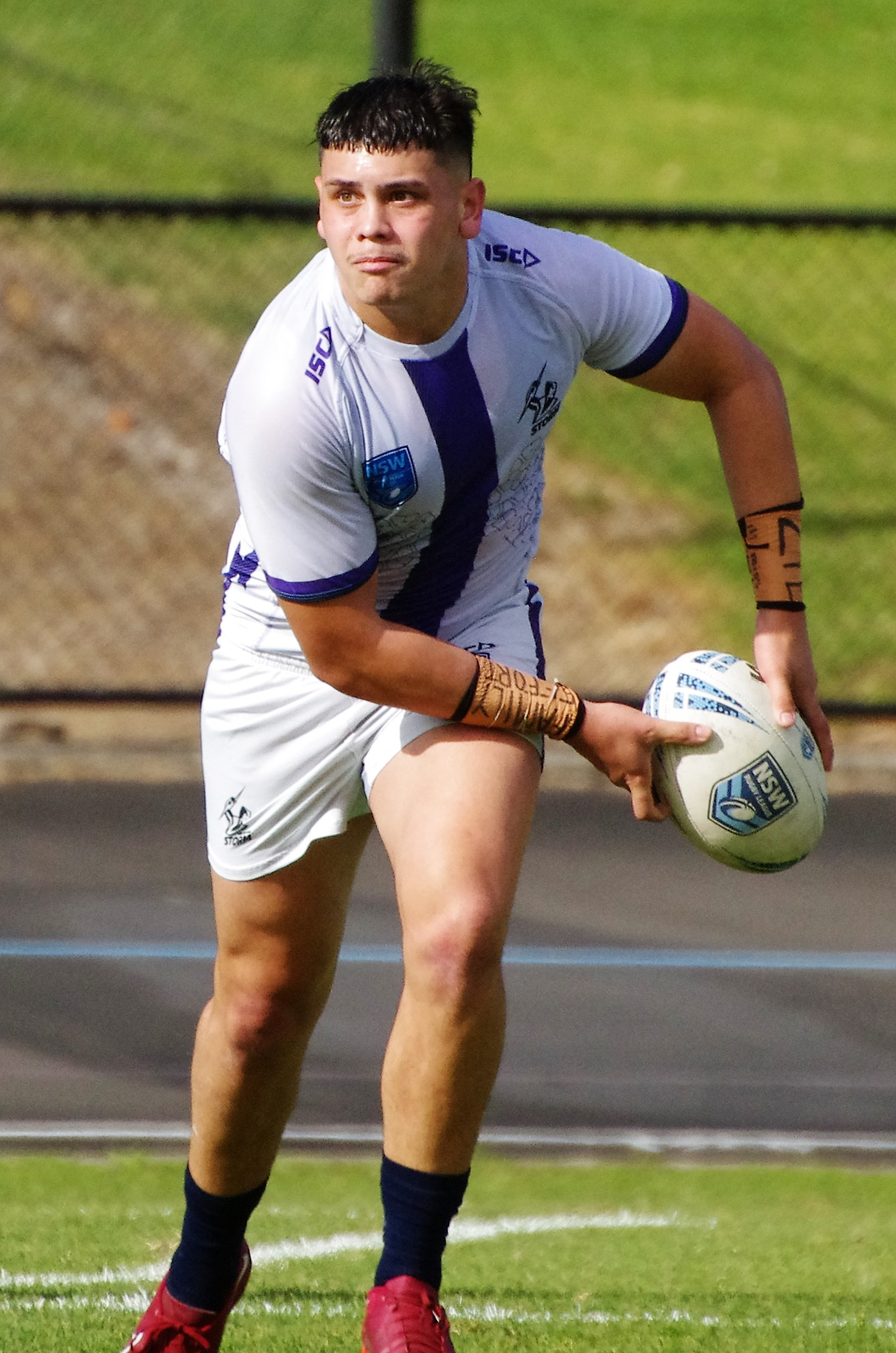

Personal information
- Born: 18 April 2005 (age 21) Ipswich, Queensland, Australia
- Height: 182 cm (6 ft 0 in)
- Weight: 93 kg (14 st 9 lb)

Playing information
- Position: Five-eighth, Lock, Second-row
Club
Years	Team	Pld	T	G	FG	P
2026–	Melbourne Storm	4	0	0	0	0
- Source: RLP

Stanley Huen (born 18 April 2005) is an Australian rugby league footballer for the Melbourne Storm in the National Rugby League (NRL).

== Biography ==
=== Early life ===
Huen, a Kutjala man, was born in Ipswich, Queensland, and educated at Ipswich Grammar School. He took up rugby league as an 11-year-old, playing at first in the juniors for the Ipswich Swifts, followed by Ipswich Brothers, and was then recruited by the Storm while with Brisbane club Souths Acacia Ridge.

=== Career ===
Huen relocated to Melbourne to link up with the Storm in 2023 and was subsequently named vice-captain of that year's Queensland under-19s State of Origin team.

Although originally a five-eighth, Huen was utilised mostly as a forward by the Storm's NSW Cup side in 2026, and made four first-grade appearances off the bench for the Storm during the 2026 NRL season, debuting in their round 10 win over the Wests Tigers at AAMI Park.
