= Jai Bowden =

Australian rugby league footballer (born 2006)

Personal information
- Born: 10 September 2006 (age 20) Nambour, Queensland, Australia
- Height: 177 cm (5 ft 10 in)
- Weight: 83 kg (13 st 1 lb)

Playing information
- Position: Hooker
Club
Years	Team	Pld	T	G	FG	P
2026–	Melbourne Storm	1	0	0	0	0
- Source: RLP

Jai Bowden (born 10 September 2006) is an Australian rugby league footballer for the Melbourne Storm in the National Rugby League (NRL).

== Early life ==
Born in Nambour, Bowden attended Mountain Creek State High School (Mountain Creek SHS) while growing up on the Sunshine Coast, where he played his junior rugby league for the Noosa Dolphins and Kawana Pirates. He also played for the Sunshine Coast Falcons in the Mal Meninga Cup during the 2023 and 2024 seasons, although he did miss part of the 2024 season due to injury.

At Mountain Creek SHS, his coach Sam Mawhinney described Bowden play at hooker in 2024: "He controls it (the game). He has that tempo that he plays with, the vision he has got, and he can give you a try off a quick ruck." He was selected in the Queensland Schoolboys representative rugby league team in 2024.

== Career ==
Bowden joined the Melbourne Storm Academy in 2023. He earned early representative honours with the under-17s Queensland Country side and in 2025 appeared in the under-19s State of Origin for Queensland.

He was a key member of Melbourne's Jersey Flegg Cup winning team in 2025, coming off the bench in the grand final against the Penrith Panthers.

In 2026, Bowden played seven NSW Cup matches for the Storm and late in the NRL season made his first-grade debut, with the 19-year-old coming on off the bench against Canterbury at Melbourne Rectangular StadiumAAMI Park]]. He is signed on by the Storm until the end of 2030.
