= Josiah Pahulu =

New Zealand rugby league player (born 2004)

Personal information
- Born: 4 May 2004 (age 22) Auckland, New Zealand
- Height: 184 cm (6 ft 0 in)
- Weight: 104 kg (16 st 5 lb)

Playing information
- Position: Prop
Club
Years	Team	Pld	T	G	FG	P
2024–25	Gold Coast Titans	22	1	0	0	4
2026	Melbourne Storm	1	0	0	0	0
	Total	23	1	0	0	4

Josiah Pahulu (/pəhuːluː/) (born 4 May 2004) is a professional rugby league footballer who plays for the Canberra Raiders as a prop in the National Rugby League (NRL).

== Background ==
Pahulu was born in Auckland, New Zealand. He was educated at Ipswich State High School (Ipswich SHS).

In 2022, Pahulu was captain of the Ipswich SHS team that won the NRL Schoolboy Cup national final against Patrician Brothers' College, Fairfield. It was the first time that Ipswich SHS had won both the Langer Cup and the national final.

== Playing career ==
Pahulu played his junior rugby league for the Springfield Panthers and was then signed by the Gold Coast Titans in 2023. In 2023, Pahulu played for the Titans' Queensland Cup feeder side, the Burleigh Bears. Pahulu made his first grade debut from the bench in his side's 35–22 loss to the North Queensland Cowboys at Townsville Stadium in round 5 of the 2024 NRL season.

=== 2025 ===
On 26 May, the Storm announced that they had signed Pahulu with immediate effect until the end of the 2027 season.

=== 2027 ===
In November 6, it was announced that Pahulu had joined the Raiders with immediate effect for the 2027 NRL season.

== Statistics ==
Year	Team	Games	Tries	Pts
2024	Gold Coast Titans	19	0	0
2025	Gold Coast Titans	3	1	4
2026	Melbourne Storm	1		
2027	Canberra Raiders			
	Totals	23	1	4
