= 2025 Melbourne Storm season =

NRL rugby league season

- NRL Rank: 2nd
- Play-off result: Runners-up
- 2025 record: Wins: 17; losses: 7
- Points scored: For: 671; against: 459

Team information
- CEO: Justin Rodski
- Coach: Craig Bellamy
- Captain: Harry Grant (19 matches) Cameron Munster & Jahrome Hughes (co-captains – 5 matches) Jahrome Hughes (1 match) Cameron Munster (2 matches)
- Stadium: AAMI Park – 30,050
- Avg. attendance: 21,677 (Note: Regular season home matches in Melbourne only)
- High attendance: 26,427 (Round 6) (Note: Regular season home matches in Melbourne only)

Top scorers
- Tries: Xavier Coates (20)
- Goals: Ryan Papenhuyzen (60)
- Points: Ryan Papenhuyzen (181)
| ← 2024 | List of seasons | 2026 → |

The 2025 Melbourne Storm season was the 28th in the club's history, competing in the 2025 NRL season. The team was coached by Craig Bellamy, coaching the club for a 23rd consecutive season. Harry Grant continued as club captain for a second season.

Melbourne qualified for the 2025 NRL Grand Final, the 12th time the club had reached the season deciding match. In the Grand Final against the Brisbane Broncos, Melbourne led 22–12 at half time, but were held scoreless in the second half to lose 26–22.

In a first for the club, the under-21 squad won the 2025 Jersey Flegg Cup premiership, winning the Grand Final 38–16 against Penrith.

== Season summary ==
- Preseason – Joining the club on train and trial contracts ahead of the season were players from the Storm academy (Coby Williamson, Mitch Jennings); Sunshine Coast Falcons (Josh Billing, Cooper-Page Wilson); Brisbane Tigers (Vaka Sikahele, Setu Tu); and North Sydney Bears (Nathaniel Roache, Morgan Harper, Ben Talty (Note: In June, Talty would be signed by the Brisbane Broncos.))
- 16 January – The club confirms that winger Dean Ieremia had suffered an achilles tendon rupture which will keep him sidelined for at least six months.
- 9 February – Harry Grant was reappointed captain, with Jahrome Hughes and Cameron Munster appointed as vice-captains. The club named a seven-man leadership group, with a number of other players named to an emerging leader group.
- 11 February – It was reported that former captain Christian Welch could be contemplating medical retirement after suffering a concussion during the club's preseason training camp. Welch had been given time away from the club to recover and was absent from a number of team activities.
- 12 February – Christian Welch announced his retirement from rugby league effective immediately. Welch retired on medical grounds due to a debilitating back injury.
- 15 February – Trailing 36–0 at half time of their first 2025 NRL Pre-season Challenge match against the New Zealand Warriors, an inexperienced Melbourne squad scored the only points of the second half in a 36–10 defeat.
- 23 February – Melbourne go without a win during the pre-season for the first time since 2019, losing their second match of the year 36–24 to the North Queensland Cowboys at Casey Fields. Sua Fa'alogo scored a try just before half time, but was forced from the field in the second half due to a hamstring injury. New signing Stefano Utoikamanu scored a try in his second match for the club ahead of the new season. In the second half, club academy prospect Hugo Peel suffered a broken jaw and severe concussion after a collision with fellow rookie Coby Williamson.
- Round 1 – Melbourne score 46 points in the first half against the Parramatta Eels to set a new club record for first half points, on the way to a 56–18 victory. Ryan Papenhuyzen and Xavier Coates each scored two tries to extend the club's round 1 winning streak to 23 matches.
- 13 March – Forward Josh King extends his contract with the club until the end of the 2027 season.
- Round 3 – Melbourne defeat 2024 NRL Grand Final opponent Penrith Panthers 30–24 at AAMI Park, with both teams scoring five tries. Cameron Munster had three try assists in the win, but was put on report for an alleged hip-drop tackle for which he was not cited by the NRL Judiciary. Halfback Jahrome Hughes suffered a broken hand, while Nick Meaney and Nelson Asofa-Solomona were both injured in a tackling collision. Meaney suffered a facial injury in the incident and Asofa-Solomona a concussion.
- Round 4 – The Storm lose their first match of the season, going down to the St George Illawarra Dragons 14–6 in wet conditions at Netstrata Jubliee Stadium. Ryan Papenhuyzen scored the club's only try in a dour match.
- Round 5 – The Storm end a three-match losing streak at 4 Pines Park in a 48–24 win against the Manly Warringah Sea Eagles. Grant Anderson scored his first NRL hat-trick.
- Round 6 — Melbourne retain the Michael Moore Trophy for the 17th successive match with a win against the Warriors. The Storm led 36–0 at half time, with Xavier Coates scoring a double. Ryan Papenhuyzen was again perfect with the boot, bringing up his 500th career point in the first half.
- Round 7 — The Dolphins defeat Melbourne 42–22 for their first win against the Storm. Melbourne had led 16–2 in the first half, before conceding the next 40 points. Jack Howarth injured his shoulder during the match, while captain Harry Grant was injured at training before travelling to Brisbane. Ryan Papenhuyzen was charged with a grade one dangerous tackle late in the match, with the club opting to fight the subsequent fine at the NRL Judiciary. The panel members dismissed the charge after two minutes of deliberation.
- Round 8 — Melbourne extend their winning streak against the South Sydney Rabbitohs in Victoria to 20 matches, with the visitors yet to win a match in Victoria. In wet conditions, Melbourne won 24–16 despite a late surge from Souths after Ryan Papenhuyzen was sent to the sin bin with eight minutes remaining for a professional foul. Eliesa Katoa was awarded the Spirit of ANZAC Medal for his efforts in the match, which included scoring a try. There was controversy before the match when the club reportedly cancelled a Welcome to Country to be performed by Indigenous Elder Aunty Joy Murphy Wandin as part of the ANZAC Day commemorations. The controversy later leading to the Victorian Aboriginal Health Service ending their partnership with the club which promoted the "Deadly Choices" campaign.
- Round 9 – In a thriller at Magic Round, the club was defeated by a penalty goal just before half time of golden point by the Canberra Raiders to lose 20–18. Melbourne had led by 14 points during the first half and had a field goal taken off the scoreboard by referee Gerard Sutton in the final ten minutes of regulation time. A controversial penalty in extra time against Stefano Utoikamanu (which also led to the forward being sent to the sin bin) earned the ire of supporters, while coach Craig Bellamy focused on a lack of discipline by his players.
- Round 10 – Ryan Papenhuyzen scored 36 points against the Wests Tigers to break the long-standing club record for individual points in a match, besting Matt Geyer's 34 points against Western Suburbs in 1999. Papenhuyzen scored four tries, including a hat-trick to start the match, together with kicking 10 of 11 conversion attempts. The 64–0 win equalled Melbourne's greatest winning margin.
- 26 May – The club secures the signing of 21-year-old prop forward Josiah Pahulu with immediate effect until the end of the 2027 season. Pahulu joins Melbourne from the Gold Coast Titans where he had played 22 NRL matches, including three in 2025.
- 29 May – It is reported that Melbourne will be ending their feeder club affiliation agreements with the Brisbane Tigers and Sunshine Coast Falcons in favour of forming their own NSW Cup team to compete in that competition from 2026. The club previously had a short-lived NSW Cup team competing as the Melbourne Storm in 2010. The club later issued a statement partially refuting the report, stating it would be maintaining its connection with the Queensland clubs.
- 5 June – Craig Bellamy confirms that he was continue in his position as head coach until the end of the 2026 season, extending his tenure to a 24th season.
- Round 18 – Missing five players to State of Origin selection, and with a number of players missing through injury, Melbourne end their three-match losing streak at Queensland Country Bank Stadium to win 26–20. Siulagi Tuimalatu-Brown made his NRL debut on the wing for the Storm, becoming the sixth Victorian-born player to make their debut with the club.
- Round 20 – Manly snap Melbourne's six match winning streak and their ten match winning streak at AAMI Park with an upset 18–16 victory. Behind 16–6 at half time, the Storm rallied to level the scores with Xavier Coates scoring a hat trick, but a late penalty goal handed the Sea Eagles the two points.
- Round 21 – In Xavier Coates' 100th NRL match, Melbourne get the better of the Sydney Roosters in a high-scoring match to win 34–30. The win comes at a cost though, with Jahrome Hughes suffering a shoulder injury that would keep him out for at least six weeks.
- 29 July – Halfback Jahrome Hughes signed a contract extension that will keep him at the club until the end of the 2030 NRL season.
- 4 August – Before the launch of the 2025 Indigenous jersey, the club issued a further statement of apology following the events on Anzac Day.
- 7 August – Former club captain and record games holder Cameron Smith was inducted into the Sport Australia Hall of Fame as an athlete member.
- Round 24 – In golden point extra time, Harry Grant scores the match-winning try to steal a 22–18 win over the reigning premiers at CommBank Stadium. Penrith had led 12–4 at half time before a try to Marion Seve levelled the scores late in the second half. Seve was playing his first NRL match wearing protective eye wear after suffering a serious eye injury while playing for the North Sydney Bears earlier in the season. Grant was at the centre of a controversial penalty against Penrith late in regulation time when he was impeded trying to charge down a field goal attempt.
- 20 August – Melbourne announce a new membership record, signing up 40,237 members to surpass the previous record of 40,161 set in 2022.
- 29 August – Ending months of speculation, the club announced the end of their feeder club partnerships with the Brisbane Tigers, Sunshine Coast Falcons and North Sydney Bears.
- Round 26 – In Craig Bellamy's 600th match in charge of the club, the Sydney Roosters spoil the party coming from 10–0 down at half time with a dominant 40–point second half to win 40–10. It was the most points conceded by the Storm in a half and the most points the club had conceded at AAMI Park since losing to the Canberra Raiders during the 2012 season.
- Round 27 – Melbourne lose consecutive matches for the first time since the 2023 season, losing to the Brisbane Broncos 30–14. It was Melbourne's third straight defeat at Suncorp Stadium and their first regular season loss to the Broncos at the venue since 2009. Halfback Jahrome Hughes returned from his shoulder injury sustained in July, only to leave the field with a broken arm during the first half. Fullback Ryan Papenhuyzen sustained a concussion from a high tackle late in the loss, while Nelson Asofa-Solomona was cited and later charged with a grade two careless high tackle charge. Asofa-Solomona was suspended by the NRL Judiciary for three matches. Melbourne ended the regular season in second place on the NRL ladder behind minor premiers Canberra.
- 6 September – Winger Xavier Coates extends his contract with the club until the end of the 2027 NRL season. Coates was the club's leading tryscorer during the 2025 regular season with 19 tries.
- Qualifying final – Melbourne progressed to a 10th preliminary final in 11 seasons in a tense 26–18 win over the Canterbury-Bankstown Bulldogs. Missing Ryan Papenhuyzen and Jahrome Hughes, young halfback Jonah Pezet stepped up guiding the Storm to the win.
- 19 September — The club announced that they will be fielding seven teams from the 2026 season, entering a reserve grade team in the NSWRL New South Wales Cup as well as junior female squads in the Under-17s Lisa Fiaola Cup and Under-19s Tarsha Gale Cup, as well as the three male junior representative teams. It will be the first time since 2010 that the Storm will have their own reserve grade team.
- 22 September — In a major change, the owners of the Storm announce that they had sold their ownership stake in the Sunshine Coast Lightning to Global Sports Management. CEO Justin Rodski quoted saying "this move will now allow the club focus on rugby league in our home of Victoria."
- Preliminary final — Melbourne qualify for the club's 12th NRL Grand Final, defeating Cronulla 22–14 in front of 29,233 fans at AAMI Park. Jahrome Hughes returned from his broken arm to lead the Storm in a dominint display.

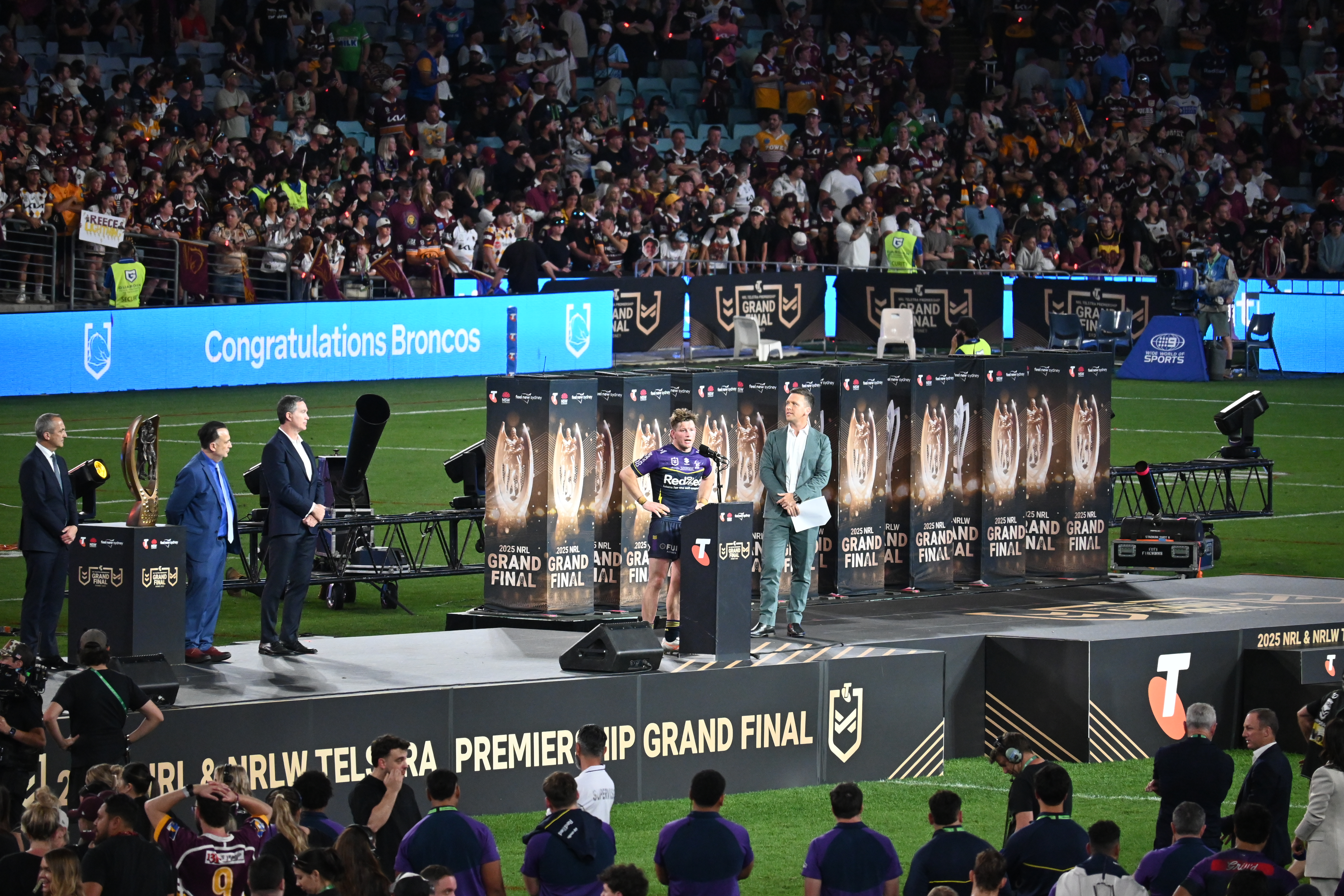
Captain Harry Grant on stage for the second year the NRL Grand Final giving the runners-up speech.

- 8 October – Xavier Coates took out his second Cameron Smith Player of the Year Award at the Melbourne Storm Player of the Year Awards held in Melbourne. Coates scored 20 tries in 22 appearances during the season.
- 9 October – Following the end of the season, the club confirms the departure of a number of players including Grant Anderson, Bronson Garlick, Dean Ieremia, and Coby Williamson. Also granted a release from his contract was life member Nelson Asofa-Solomona after 215 matches with the Storm.
- 24 October – Shawn Blore escaped conviction, but received a six-month good behaviour bond for his role in an incident in Sydney in July 2024. Blore plead guilty to common assault following a fight involving his brother outside a restaurant. Blore was later issued with a breach notice by the NRL.
- 29 October – Young halfback Jonah Pezet activated a release clause in his contract to sign a four-year contract with the Parramatta Eels (2026) and Brisbane Broncos (2027–2029), leaving the Storm after playing 18 matches for the club across three NRL seasons.
- 30 October – In a surprise move, Ryan Papenhuyzen was granted an immediate release from the final year of his contract with the club. Papenhuyzen had played 113 matches with the Storm across seven NRL seasons after joining the club in 2017. There had been rumours that Papenhuyzen was a potential target of the Rugby 360 organisation.
- 20 November – Club captain Harry Grant extends his contract with the club until the end of the 2028 season.
- 11 December – Harry Grant is awarded the IRL Golden Boot Award for his performances for Australia in 2025. Grant won the award ahead of teammate Cameron Munster to be the fifth Storm player to win the award and the first since Cameron Smith won his second award in 2017.
- 18 December – Melbourne were issued with a breach notice and a fine of $25,000 (with half suspended for two years) for twice selecting players that were on a development or training contract during the 2025 season when they were ineligible for selection.

=== Milestone games ===
| Round | Player | Milestone |
|---|---|---|
| Round 1 | Stefano Utoikamanu | Storm debut |
| Round 1 | Will Warbrick | 50th match |
| Round 5 | Alec MacDonald | 50th match |
| Round 5 | Moses Leo | NRL debut |
| Round 6 | Ryan Papenhuyzen | 500 career points |
| Round 9 | Eliesa Katoa | 100th match |
| Round 9 | Ryan Papenhuyzen | 100th match |
| Round 18 | Siulagi Tuimalatu-Brown | NRL debut |
| Round 20 | Nick Meaney | 150th match |
| Round 21 | Xavier Coates | 100th match |
| Round 25 | Marion Seve | 50th match |
| Round 26 | Craig Bellamy | 600 Storm matches as coach |
| Round 26 | Stefano Utoikamanu | 100th match |
| Grand Final | Trent Loiero | 100th match |

== Fixtures ==
=== Pre-season Challenge ===
| Date | Rd | Opponent | Venue | Result | Mel. | Opp. | Tries | Goals | Field goals | Ref |
|---|---|---|---|---|---|---|---|---|---|---|
| 15 February | Trial | New Zealand Warriors | FMG Stadium Waikato, Hamilton | Lost | 10 | 36 | K Bradley, B Talty | E Morris 1/1, K Russell-Smith 0/1 | | |
| 23 February | Trial | North Queensland Cowboys | Casey Fields, Melbourne | Lost | 24 | 36 | N Meaney, S Fa'alogo, K Russell-Smith, S Utoikamanu, S Blore | N Meaney 1/2, T Wishart 1/2, K Russell-Smith 0/1 | | |

=== Regular season ===
==== Result by round ====
| Round | 1 | 2 | 3 | 4 | 5 | 6 | 7 | 8 | 9 | 10 | 11 | 12 | 13 | 14 | 15 | 16 | 17 | 18 | 19 | 20 | 21 | 22 | 23 | 24 | 25 | 26 | 27 |
|---|---|---|---|---|---|---|---|---|---|---|---|---|---|---|---|---|---|---|---|---|---|---|---|---|---|---|---|
| Ground | H | – | H | A | A | H | A | H | N | H | A | – | A | H | – | A | H | A | A | H | A | A | H | A | H | H | A |
| Result | W | B | W | L | W | W | L | W | L | W | L | B | W | W | B | W | W | W | W | L | W | W | W | W | W | L | L |
| Position | 1 | 1 | 1 | 4 | 3 | 2 | 2 | 2 | 4 | 3 | 4 | 4 | 4 | 4 | 4 | 3 | 3 | 2 | 2 | 3 | 3 | 2 | 2 | 2 | 2 | 2 | 2 |
| Points | 2 | 4 | 6 | 6 | 8 | 10 | 10 | 12 | 12 | 14 | 14 | 16 | 18 | 20 | 22 | 24 | 26 | 28 | 30 | 30 | 32 | 34 | 36 | 38 | 40 | 40 | 40 |

Source: National Rugby League
A = Away; H = Home; N = Neutral; B = Bye; W = Win; D = Draw; L = Loss

==== Matches ====
- (g.p.) – Golden Point extra time
- (pen) – Penalty try

| Date | Rd | Opponent | H/A | Venue | Result | Mel. | Opp. | Tries | Goals | Field goals | Ref |
|---|---|---|---|---|---|---|---|---|---|---|---|
| 9 March | 1 | Parramatta Eels | Home | AAMI Park, Melbourne | Won | 56 | 18 | X Coates (2), R Papenhuyzen (2), J King, E Katoa, H Grant, N Meaney, W Warbrick, J Hughes | N Meaney 8/10 | | |
| 16 March | 2 | Bye | | | | | | | | | |
| 20 March | 3 | Penrith Panthers | Home | AAMI Park, Melbourne | Won | 30 | 24 | G Anderson, E Katoa, X Coates, T Wishart, R Papenhuyzen | N Meaney 3/3, R Papenhuyzen 2/3 | | |
| 25 March | 4 | St. George Illawarra Dragons | Away | Netstrata Jubille Stadium, Sydney | Lost | 8 | 14 | R Papenhuyzen | T Wishart 2/2 | | |
| 6 April | 5 (Note: Multicultural Round) | Manly Warringah Sea Eagles | Away | 4 Pines Park, Sydney | Won | 48 | 24 | G Anderson (3), S Utoikamanu, C Munster, R Papenhuyzen, B Garlick, J Howarth | R Papenhuyzen 7/7, T Wishart 1/1 | | |
| 13 April | 6 | New Zealand Warriors | Home | AAMI Park, Melbourne | Won | 42 | 14 | X Coates (2), J King, S Blore, T Loiero, H Grant, G Anderson | R Papenhuyzen 7/7 | | |
| 18 April | 7 | Dolphins | Away | Suncorp Stadium, Brisbane | Lost | 22 | 42 | K Bradley (2), X Coates, R Papenhuyzen | R Papenhuyzen 3/4 | | |
| 25 April | 8 (Note: ANZAC Round) | South Sydney Rabbitohs | Home | AAMI Park, Melbourne | Won | 24 | 16 | R Papenhuyzen, X Coates, E Katoa, T Wishart | R Papenhuyzen 4/5 | | |
| 4 May | 9 (Note: Magic Round) | Canberra Raiders | Home | Suncorp Stadium, Brisbane | Lost (g.p.) | 18 | 20 | G Anderson, R Papenhuyzen, S Fa'alogo | R Papenhuyzen 3/5 | | |
| 11 May | 10 (Note: Women in League Round) | Wests Tigers | Home | AAMI Park, Melbourne | Won | 64 | 0 | R Papenhuyzen (4), J King, J Hughes, N Meaney, N Asofa-Solomona, E Katoa, C Munster, B Garlick | R Papenhuyzen 10/11 | | |
| 17 May | 11 | Cronulla-Sutherland Sharks | Away | Sharks Stadium, Sydney | Lost | 26 | 31 | X Coates (3), G Anderson, N Meaney | R Papenhuyzen 3/5 | | |
| 24 May | 12 | Bye | | | | | | | | | |
| 31 May | 13 | Gold Coast Titans | Away | Cbus Super Stadium, Gold Coast | Won | 28 | 16 | S Fa'alogo (2), G Anderson (2), T Wishart | R Papenhuyzen 4/5 | R Papenhuyzen 0/1 | |
| 6 June | 14 | North Queensland Cowboys | Home | AAMI Park, Melbourne | Won | 38 | 14 | J Hughes (2), E Katoa, N Meaney, N Asofa-Solomona, T Wishart | R Papenhuyzen 7/7 | | |
| 14 June | 15 | Bye | | | | | | | | | |
| 21 June | 16 | South Sydney Rabbitohs | Away | Accor Stadium, Sydney | Won (g.p.) | 25 | 24 | H Grant, J Hughes, G Anderson, T Wishart | R Papenhuyzen 4/4 | R Papenhuyzen 1/2 | |
| 29 June | 17 | Cronulla-Sutherland Sharks | Home | AAMI Park, Melbourne | Won | 30 | 6 | E Katoa, S Fa'alogo, N Meaney, J Hughes, T Loiero | R Papenhuyzen 4/6, N Meaney 1/1 | | |
| 5 July | 18 | North Queensland Cowboys | Away | Queensland Country Bank Stadium, Townsville | Won | 26 | 20 | N Meaney (2), E Katoa, N Asofa-Solomona | N Meaney 5/5 | | |
| 12 July | 19 | Newcastle Knights | Away | McDonald Jones Stadium, Newcastle | Won | 32 | 14 | E Katoa (2), T Loiero (2), K Bradley (2) | N Meaney 3/6, J Pezet 1/1 | | |
| 19 July | 20 | Manly Warringah Sea Eagles | Home | AAMI Park, Melbourne | Lost | 16 | 18 | X Coates (3) | N Meaney 2/3 | | |
| 24 July | 21 | Sydney Roosters | Away | Allianz Stadium, Sydney | Won | 34 | 30 | J King (2), J Howarth, H Grant, N Meaney, S Utoikamanu | N Meaney 5/7 | | |
| 31 July | 22 | Parramatta Eels | Away | CommBank Stadium, Sydney | Won | 16 | 10 | E Katoa, T Kamikamica, X Coates | R Papenhuyzen 1/4, N Meaney 1/1 | | |
| 7 August | 23 (Note: Indigenous Round) | Brisbane Broncos | Home | AAMI Park, Melbourne | Won | 22 | 2 | X Coates (2), (Note: Including one penalty try.) T Wishart, R Papenhuyzen | N Meaney 3/4 | | |
| 14 August | 24 | Penrith Panthers | Away | CommBank Stadium, Sydney | Won (g.p.) | 22 | 18 | X Coates (2), J Chan, M Seve, H Grant | N Meaney 1/4 | C Munster 0/1 | |
| 22 August | 25 | Canterbury-Bankstown Bulldogs | Home | AAMI Park, Melbourne | Won | 20 | 14 | E Katoa, R Papenhuyzen, X Coates | N Meaney 4/4 | R Papenhuyzen 0/1 | |
| 29 August | 26 | Sydney Roosters | Home | AAMI Park, Melbourne | Lost | 10 | 40 | S Blore, G Anderson | R Papenhuyzen | | |
| 4 September | 27 | Brisbane Broncos | Away | Suncorp Stadium, Brisbane | Lost | 14 | 30 | E Katoa, W Warbrick, N Meaney | N Meaney 1/3 | | |

Fixture notes:

=== Finals ===
Qualifying final

Friday, 12 September
19:50 AEST (UTC+10)

| Melbourne Storm | 26 – 18 | Canterbury-Bankstown Bulldogs |
|---|---|---|
| Tries: 4 Katoa 4'; Lisati 35'; Wishart 66'; Warbrick 77'; Goals: 5 Meaney 5', pen 24', 36' (3/3); Pezet 68', 78' (2/2) | 1st: 14–12; 2nd: 12–6; Report | Tries: 3 Sexton 21'; Kiraz 30'; Burton 58'; Goals: 3 Burton 22', 32', 60' (3/3) |

AAMI Park, Melbourne
Attendance: 22,117
Referee: Adam Gee
Video referee: Ashley Klein
Touch judges: Dave Munro, Matt Noyen

Preliminary final

Friday, 26 September
19:50 AEST (UTC+10)

| Melbourne Storm | 22 – 14 | Cronulla-Sutherland Sharks |
|---|---|---|
| Tries: 4 Warbrick 7'; Hughes 16'; Papenhuyzen 36'; Coates 75'; Goals: 3 Meaney 17', 36', pen 66' (3/5) | 1st: 16–8; 2nd: 6–6; Report | Tries: 3 Katoa 12', 30'; Iro 80'; Goals: 1 Hynes pen 59' (1/4) |

AAMI Park, Melbourne
Attendance: 29,233
Referee: Ashley Klein
Video referee: Chris Butler
Touch judges: Ziggy Przeklasa-Adamski, Chris Sutton

2025 NRL Grand Final

Sunday, 5 October
19:30 AEDT (UTC+11)

| Melbourne Storm | 22 – 26 | Brisbane Broncos |
|---|---|---|
| Tries: 4 Meaney 8'; Katoa 14'; Warbrick 22'; Hughes 35'; Goals: 3 Meaney 9', 16', 37' (3/4); Sin bin: Loiero (yellow card) 78' to 80' | 1st: 22–12; 2nd: 0–14; Report | Tries: 5 Mariner 3', 55'; Shibasaki 46', 58'; Walsh 31'; Goals: 3 Reynolds 4', 32' (2/3); Walsh 59' (1/2) |

Accor Stadium, Sydney
Attendance: 80,223
Referee: Grant Atkins
Video referee: Ashley Klein
Touch judges: Chris Sutton, David Munro
Clive Churchill Medal: Reece Walsh (Brisbane)

== Ladder ==
| Pos | Team | Pld | W | D | L | B | PF | PA | PD | Pts | Qualification |
|---|---|---|---|---|---|---|---|---|---|---|---|
| 1 | Canberra Raiders | 24 | 19 | 0 | 5 | 3 | 654 | 506 | +148 | 44 | Advance to finals series |
| 2 | Melbourne Storm | 24 | 17 | 0 | 7 | 3 | 671 | 459 | +212 | 40 | Advance to finals series |
| 3 | Canterbury-Bankstown Bulldogs | 24 | 16 | 0 | 8 | 3 | 534 | 414 | +120 | 38 | Advance to finals series |
| 4 | Brisbane Broncos (P) | 24 | 15 | 0 | 9 | 3 | 680 | 508 | +172 | 36 | Advance to finals series |
| 5 | Cronulla-Sutherland Sharks | 24 | 15 | 0 | 9 | 3 | 599 | 490 | +109 | 36 | Advance to finals series |
| 6 | New Zealand Warriors | 24 | 14 | 0 | 10 | 3 | 517 | 496 | +21 | 34 | Advance to finals series |
| 7 | Penrith Panthers | 24 | 13 | 1 | 10 | 3 | 576 | 469 | +107 | 33 | Advance to finals series |
| 8 | Sydney Roosters | 24 | 13 | 0 | 11 | 3 | 653 | 521 | +132 | 32 | Advance to finals series |
| 9 | Dolphins | 24 | 12 | 0 | 12 | 3 | 721 | 596 | +125 | 30 | |
| 10 | Manly Warringah Sea Eagles | 24 | 12 | 0 | 12 | 3 | 555 | 534 | +21 | 30 | |
| 11 | Parramatta Eels | 24 | 10 | 0 | 14 | 3 | 502 | 578 | −76 | 26 | |
| 12 | North Queensland Cowboys | 24 | 9 | 1 | 14 | 3 | 538 | 684 | −146 | 25 | |
| 13 | Wests Tigers | 24 | 9 | 0 | 15 | 3 | 477 | 612 | −135 | 24 | |
| 14 | South Sydney Rabbitohs | 24 | 9 | 0 | 15 | 3 | 427 | 608 | −181 | 24 | |
| 15 | St. George Illawarra Dragons | 24 | 8 | 0 | 16 | 3 | 498 | 628 | −130 | 22 | |
| 16 | Gold Coast Titans | 24 | 6 | 0 | 18 | 3 | 520 | 719 | −199 | 18 | |
| 17 | Newcastle Knights | 24 | 6 | 0 | 18 | 3 | 338 | 638 | −300 | 18 | |

Source: National Rugby League
(P) Premiers

== Coaching staff ==
- Craig Bellamy – Head Coach
- Marc Brentnall – Assistant Coach
- Aaron Bellamy – Assistant Coach
- Ryan Hinchcliffe – Assistant Coach
- Todd Lowrie – Development Coach

== 2025 squad ==
List current as of 5 July 2025

| Cap | Nat. | Player name | Position | First Storm game | Previous First Grade RL club (Note: Previous First Grade RL club: This column denotes the previous RL club the player was signed to and played first grade RL for. If they are yet to debut then this is stipulated. If they were merely signed to the club but did not play then it is not counted) |
|---|---|---|---|---|---|
| 160 | (Australia) | Cameron Munster | FE, FB | 2014 | (Australia) Melbourne Storm |
| 166 | (New Zealand) | Nelson Asofa-Solomona | SR, PR | 2015 | (Australia) Melbourne Storm |
| 181 | (Fiji) | Tui Kamikamica | SR, PR | 2017 | (Australia) Melbourne Storm |
| 184 | (New Zealand) | Jahrome Hughes | FE, HB | 2017 | (Australia) North Queensland Cowboys |
| 188 | (Australia) | Harry Grant | HK | 2018 | (Australia) Melbourne Storm |
| 193 | (Samoa) | Marion Seve | WG | 2019 | (Australia) Melbourne Storm |
| 194 | (Australia) | Ryan Papenhuyzen | FB | 2019 | (Australia) Melbourne Storm |
| 212 | (Australia) | Trent Loiero | SR | 2021 | (Australia) Melbourne Storm |
| 213 | (Samoa) | Dean Ieremia | WG | 2021 | (Australia) Melbourne Storm |
| 217 | (Papua New Guinea) | Xavier Coates | WG | 2022 | (Australia) Brisbane Broncos |
| 218 | (Australia) | Nick Meaney | FB | 2022 | (Australia) Canterbury Bulldogs |
| 219 | (Australia) | Josh King | PR | 2022 | (Australia) Newcastle Knights |
| 220 | (Australia) | Tyran Wishart | FE, HK | 2022 | (Australia) Melbourne Storm |
| 221 | (Australia) | Alec MacDonald | LK | 2022 | (Australia) Melbourne Storm |
| 222 | (Australia) | Grant Anderson | CE | 2022 | (Australia) Melbourne Storm |
| 225 | (New Zealand) | William Warbrick | CE, WG | 2023 | (Australia) Melbourne Storm |
| 226 | (Tonga) | Eliesa Katoa | SR | 2023 | New Zealand Warriors |
| 227 | (Australia) | Bronson Garlick | LK, SR | 2023 | (Australia) Melbourne Storm |
| 228 | (Australia) | Kane Bradley | WG, CE | 2023 | (Australia) North Queensland Cowboys |
| 229 | (Australia) | Jonah Pezet | HB | 2023 | (Australia) Melbourne Storm |
| 231 | (Samoa) | Sualauvi Fa'alogo | FB, WG | 2023 | (Australia) Melbourne Storm |
| 232 | (Australia) | Jack Howarth | SR | 2023 | (Australia) Melbourne Storm |
| 233 | (France) | Joe Chan | SR | 2023 | (France) Catalans Dragons |
| 234 | (Australia) | Shawn Blore | SR | 2024 | (Australia) Wests Tigers |
| 235 | (Samoa) | Lazarus Vaalepu | PR | 2024 | (Australia) Melbourne Storm |
| 236 | (Australia) | Keagan Russell-Smith | FE, HB | 2024 | (Australia) Melbourne Storm |
| 237 | (Samoa) | Ativalu Lisati | PR | 2024 | (Australia) Melbourne Storm |
| 239 | (Samoa) | Stefano Utoikamanu | PR | 2025 | (Australia) Wests Tigers |
| 240 | (New Zealand) | Moses Leo | CE, WG | 2025 | (Australia) Melbourne Storm |
| 241 | (Australia) | Siulagi Tuimalatu-Brown | CE, WG | 2025 | (Australia) Melbourne Storm |
| – | (Australia) | Angus Hinchey | SR | Yet to debut | (Australia) Melbourne Storm |
| – | (Australia) | Stanley Huen | FE | Yet to debut | (Australia) Melbourne Storm |
| – | (New Zealand) | Josiah Pahulu | PR | Yet to debut | (Australia) Gold Coast Titans |
| – | (Australia) | Gabriel Satrick | HK | Yet to debut | (Australia) Melbourne Storm |
| – | (Australia) | Coby Williamson | CE | Yet to debut | (Australia) Melbourne Storm |

== Player movements ==
Losses

- Ammaron Gudgeon to St. George Illawarra Dragons (Note: Gudgeon would later earn a NSW Cup contract from the South Sydney Rabbitohs.)
- Chris Lewis to Retired (Note: Lewis took up a coaching role at the Canberra Raiders.)
- Tepai Moeroa to Released
- Tristan Powell to Brisbane Broncos
- Young Tonumaipea to Retired
- Christian Welch to Retired

Gains

- Moses Leo from New Zealand rugby sevens
- Josiah Pahulu from Gold Coast Titans (midseason)
- Stefano Utoikamanu from Wests Tigers

== Representative honours ==
This table lists all players who have played a representative match in 2025.

- (c) = Captain
- (vc) = Vice-captain

| Player | NRL All Star match | State of Origin 1 (Note: Stefano Utoikamanu was selected as a reserve for New South Wales.) | State of Origin 2 (Note: Jack Howarth was selected as a reserve for Queensland.) | State of Origin 3 | Internationals/Pacific Championships (Note: Jahrome Hughes was not selected for New Zealand due to injury.) |
|---|---|---|---|---|---|
| Nelson Asofa-Solomona | —N/a | —N/a | —N/a | —N/a | New Zealand |
| Xavier Coates | —N/a | Queensland | Queensland | Queensland | ~~Australia~~ (Note: Following his selection for Australia, Coates was forced to withdraw squad due to injury.) |
| Harry Grant | —N/a | Queensland | Queensland | Queensland | Australia (vc) (Note: Harry Grant was acting captain for the second test of the 2025 Kangaroo tour of England.) |
| Tui Kamikamica | —N/a | —N/a | —N/a | —N/a | Fiji (c) |
| Eliesa Katoa | —N/a | —N/a | —N/a | —N/a | Tonga |
| Ativalu Lisati | —N/a | —N/a | —N/a | —N/a | Samoa |
| Trent Loiero | —N/a | Queensland | Queensland | Queensland | —N/a |
| Cameron Munster | —N/a | Queensland | Queensland (c) | Queensland (c) | Australia |
| Stefano Utoikamanu | —N/a | —N/a | New South Wales | New South Wales | Tonga |
| Will Warbrick | Māori | —N/a | —N/a | —N/a | —N/a |
| Tyran Wishart | —N/a | —N/a | —N/a | —N/a | Prime Minister's XIII |

Additionally club coach Craig Bellamy and football manager Frank Ponissi were both part of the NSW State of Origin set up, with Bellamy appointed as an adviser to NSW coach Laurie Daley and Ponissi continuing in his role as team performance manager which he commenced in 2024.

Five Melbourne Storm junior representative players were selected in the squads for the Under-19 State of Origin match between New South Wales and Queensland on 19 June at Sunshine Coast Stadium. Queensland selected Jai Bowden, Kobi Floro, Amaziah Murgha and Hayden Watson, (Note: While contracted to the Melbourne Storm academy, Watson plays for the Burleigh Bears.) while New South Wales selected Cooper Clarke. Of the five selected players, four would play in Queensland's 23–22 victory, with Amaziah Murgha listed as the Queensland reserve.

Former player and current member of the coaching staff Ryan Hinchcliffe was appointed as an assistant coach to the Samoa national rugby league team ahead of the Pacific Championships. Hinchcliffe acting as an assistant to head coach Ben Gardiner.

== Statistics ==
This table contains playing statistics for all Melbourne Storm players to have played in the 2025 NRL season.

- Statistics sources:

| Name | Appearances | Tries | Goals | Field goals | Points |
|---|---|---|---|---|---|
| Grant Anderson | 24 | 11 | 0 | 0 | 44 |
| Nelson Asofa-Solomona | 12 | 3 | 0 | 0 | 12 |
| Shawn Blore | 24 | 2 | 0 | 0 | 8 |
| Kane Bradley | 5 | 4 | 0 | 0 | 16 |
| Joe Chan | 17 | 1 | 0 | 0 | 4 |
| Xavier Coates | 22 | 20 | 0 | 0 | 80 |
| Sualauvi Fa'alogo | 7 | 4 | 0 | 0 | 16 |
| Bronson Garlick | 13 | 2 | 0 | 0 | 8 |
| Harry Grant | 19 | 5 | 0 | 0 | 20 |
| Jack Howarth | 16 | 2 | 0 | 0 | 8 |
| Jahrome Hughes | 20 | 8 | 0 | 0 | 32 |
| Tui Kamikamica | 24 | 1 | 0 | 0 | 4 |
| Eliesa Katoa | 26 | 13 | 0 | 0 | 52 |
| Josh King | 26 | 5 | 0 | 0 | 20 |
| Moses Leo | 2 | 0 | 0 | 0 | 0 |
| Ativalu Lisati | 14 | 1 | 0 | 0 | 4 |
| Trent Loiero | 25 | 4 | 0 | 0 | 16 |
| Alec MacDonald | 20 | 0 | 0 | 0 | 0 |
| Nick Meaney | 22 | 10 | 46 | 0 | 132 |
| Cameron Munster | 24 | 2 | 0 | 0 | 8 |
| Ryan Papenhuyzen | 21 | 15 | 60 | 1 | 181 |
| Jonah Pezet | 8 | 0 | 3 | 0 | 6 |
| Marion Seve | 4 | 1 | 0 | 0 | 4 |
| Siulagi Tuimalatu-Brown | 1 | 0 | 0 | 0 | 0 |
| Stefano Utoikamanu | 25 | 2 | 0 | 0 | 8 |
| Lazarus Vaalepu | 4 | 0 | 0 | 0 | 0 |
| William Warbrick | 7 | 5 | 0 | 0 | 20 |
| Tyran Wishart | 27 | 7 | 3 | 0 | 34 |
| 28 players used | — | 129 | 112 | 1/0 | 741 |

=== Scorers ===
Most points in a game: 36 (Note: New club record)

- Round 10 – Ryan Papenhuyzen (4 tries, 10 goals) vs Wests Tigers

Most tries in a game: 4

- Round 10 – Ryan Papenhuyzen vs Wests Tigers

=== Winning games ===
Highest score in a winning game: 64 points

- Round 10 vs Wests Tigers

Lowest score in a winning game: 16 points

- Round 22 vs Parramatta Eels

Greatest winning margin: 64 points

- Round 10 vs Wests Tigers

Greatest number of games won consecutively: 6

- Rounds 13–19

=== Losing games ===
Highest score in a losing game: 26 points

- Round 11 vs Cronulla-Sutherland Sharks

Lowest score in a losing game: 8 points

- Round 4 vs St George Illawarra Dragons

Greatest losing margin: 30 points

- Round 26 vs Sydney Roosters

Greatest number of games lost consecutively: 2

- Rounds 26–27

=== NRL Judiciary ===
A number of Melbourne players were cited by the match review committee for incidents through the 2025 season, with the following results from the NRL Judiciary.

| Round | Player | Offence & grade | Result | Ref |
|---|---|---|---|---|
| Round 1 | Lazarus Vaalepu | High tackle — Careless (grade 1) | fined $1,000 | |
| Round 6 | Tui Kamikamica | High tackle — Careless (grade 1) | fined $1,000 | |
| Round 7 | Tui Kamikamica | High tackle — Careless (grade 1) | fined $1,800 | |
| Round 7 | Ryan Papenhuyzen | Dangerous contact (grade 1) | Not guilty | |
| Round 20 | Nelson Asofa-Solomona | Dangerous contact (grade 1) | 2 matches | |
| Round 21 | Tui Kamikamica | Crusher tackle (grade 1) | fined $1,500 | |
| Round 22 | Eliesa Katoa | High tackle — Careless (grade 1) | fined $1,000 | |
| Round 25 | Harry Grant | Shoulder charge (grade 2) | 2 matches | |
| Round 26 | Nelson Asofa-Solomona | High tackle — Careless (grade 1) | fined $3,000 | |
| Round 27 | Nelson Asofa-Solomona | High tackle — Careless (grade 2) | 3 matches | |
| Preliminary final | Trent Loiero | Dangerous contact (grade 1) | fined $1,000 | |
| Grand Final | Trent Loiero | High tackle — Careless (grade 2) | 2 matches | |
| Grand Final | Jahrome Hughes | High tackle — Careless (grade 1) | fined $1,000 | |

== Jerseys ==
| Home | Away |

In November 2023, Melbourne Storm announced a new sponsorship and apparel partnership agreement with Irish sportswear company O'Neills. In March 2025, major sponsor RedZed extended their partnership with the club until the end of the 2028 season, with their logo to remain on the club's jersey.

Home

As part of the NRL's two year jersey cycle, the 2025 home jersey is the same as the 2024 version originally revealed in November 2023. The jersey is navy blue with a purple yoke and sleeves. There are bright yellow lightning bolt designs on the side panels, and a revised Big V logo at the top of the rear of the jersey as a continuation of the Our Home, Victoria acknowledgment which began during the 2020 season to honour Storm's home state. This jersey will be worn with navy blue shorts and socks.

Away

As with the home jersey, the away jersey is the same as what was worn during the 2024 season. It is worn when the home jersey creates a clash with the opposition, and is a similar design to the home jersey, with white replacing the navy blue base colour. This jersey is worn with purple shorts, with white socks.

ANZAC Day

For the first time in club history a jersey designed to honour a single individual was unveiled on 16 April which was worn in Melbourne's ANZAC Day match against South Sydney. The design honoured Air Commodore Arthur Henry (Harry) Cobby a Melbourne-born aviator who served during both World Wars. The design features a flying formation, a purple and navy chevron and checkerboard pattern, together with the ANZAC Appeal logo and red poppy.

Alternate

In the round 20 match against Manly, the team wore a jersey that mixed in design elements from past Melbourne Storm jerseys. A yellow collar, reminiscent of the 1998 and 1999 home jerseys, complete with white and yellow lightning bolt motifs formed a deep chevron similar to those worn by past Storm teams. The base of the jersey was navy blue, with a purple yoke inside the lightning bolt chevrons.

Indigenous

Designed by Warumungu and Yawuru man David Roe, the club's 2025 Indigenous jersey was worn in the round 23 match against the Brisbane Broncos. The design features dot painting motifs representing journeys and meeting places, as well as turtles which is a symbol of the artist's family. The back of the jersey includes special recognition to the club's first Indigenous player Peter Robinson.

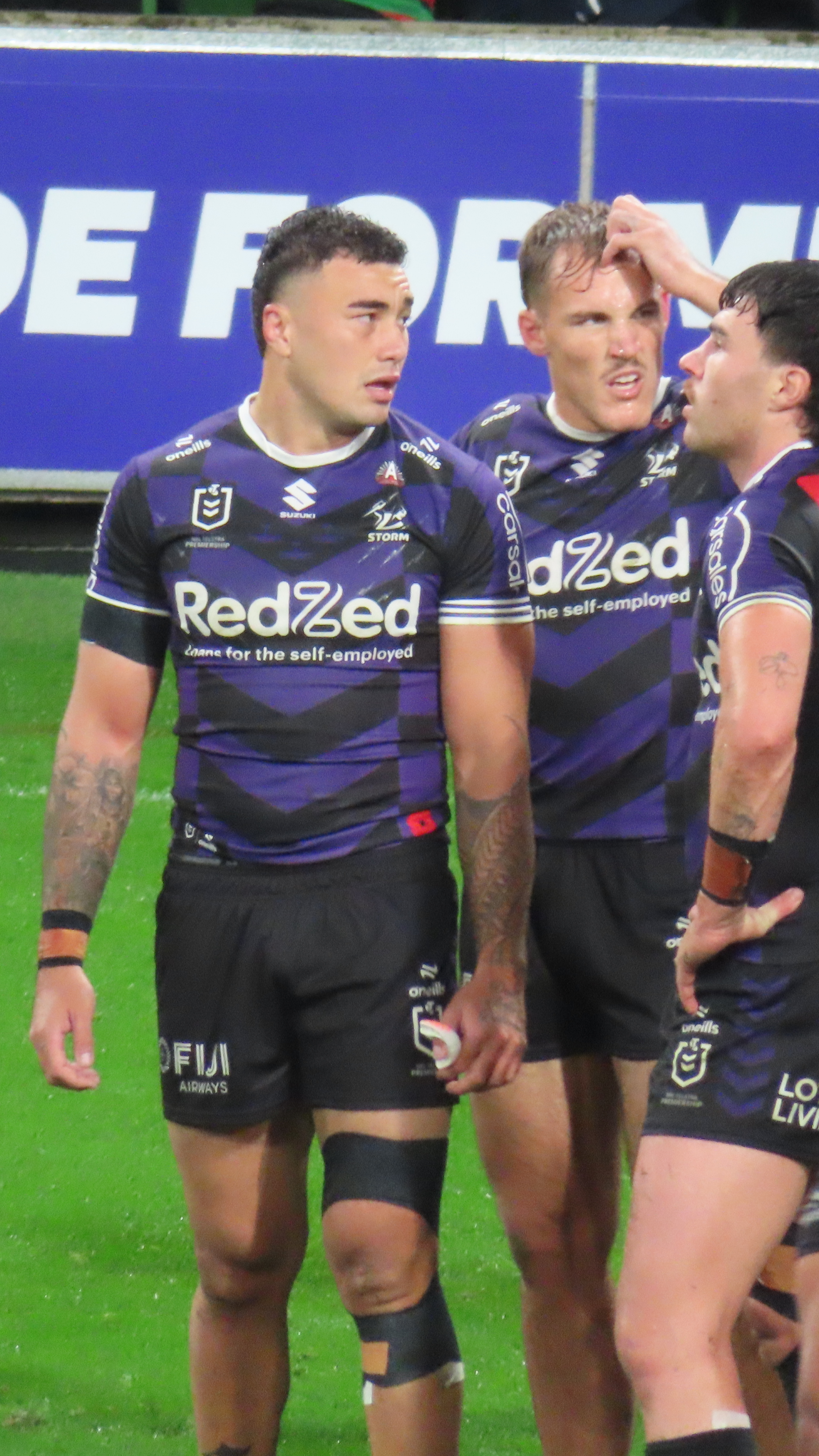
Joe Chan wearing the club's 2025 ANZAC Day jersey.

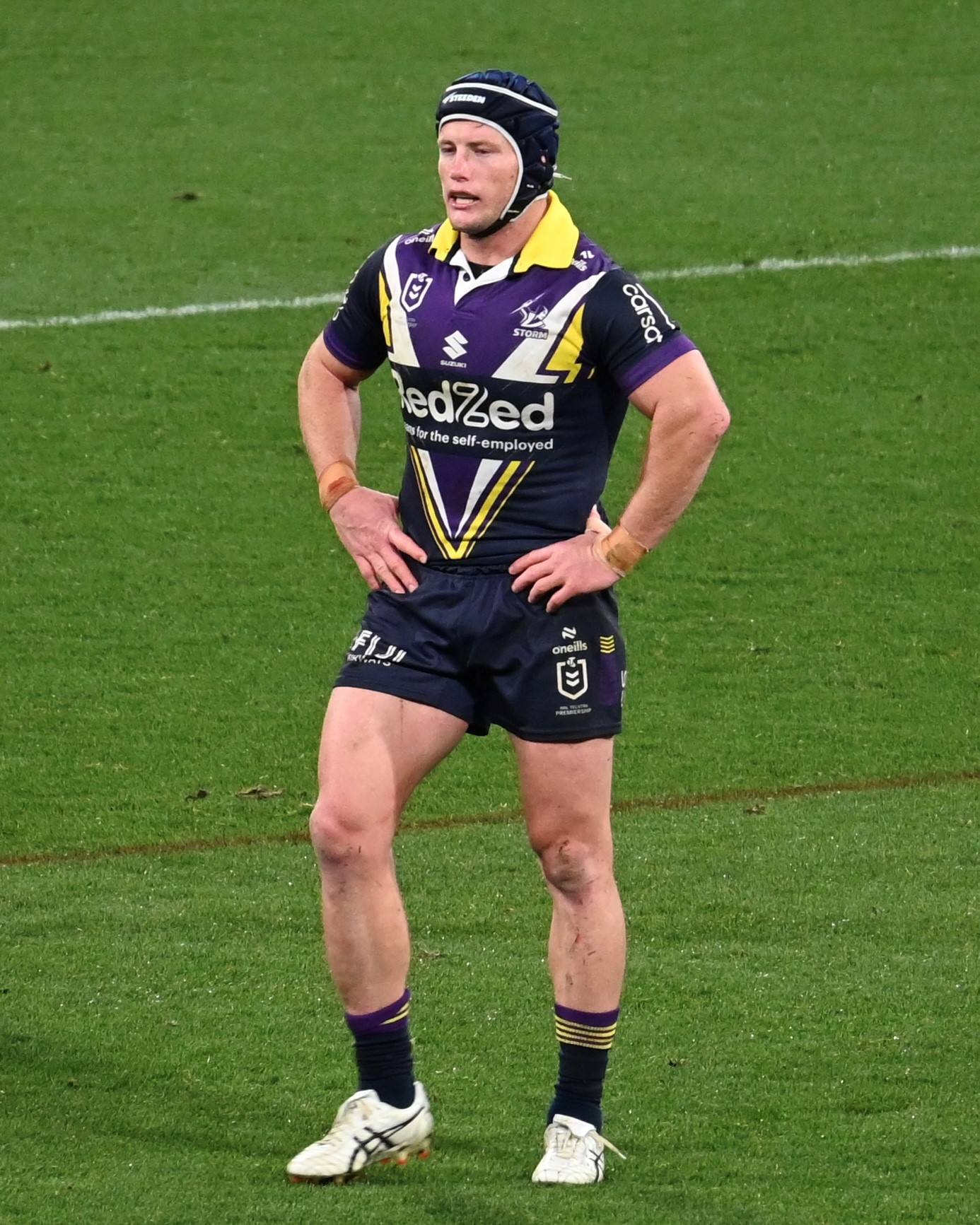
Club captain Harry Grant wearing the Storm's 2025 alternate jersey in round 20.

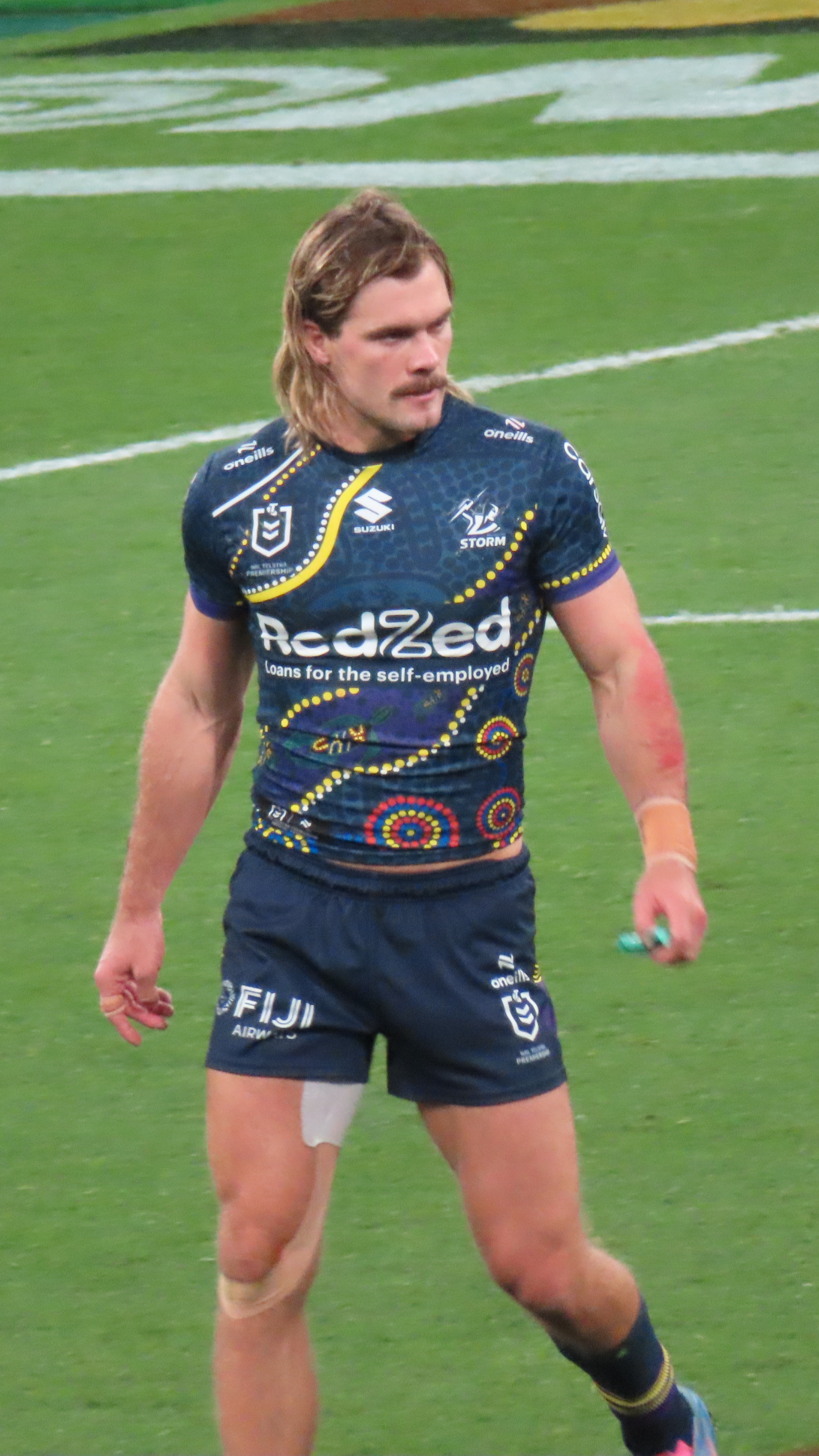
Ryan Papenhuyzen wearing the Indigenous round jersey designed by David Roe.

== Junior Representatives ==
The club entered teams in the 2025 New South Wales Rugby League junior representative competitions with the following coaching staff:

- Jersey Flegg Cup (Under-21s): Mark Russell (coach), Nate Myles (assistant)
- S.G. Ball Cup (Under-19s): Matt Duffie (coach), Justin O'Neill (assistant)
- Harold Matthews Cup (Under-17s): Tony Adam (coach)

The club's academy program had Tim Auremi as Pathways Operations Manager and Dean Benton as Pathways Performance Manager.

The Under-19s squad finished the S.G. Ball Cup regular season in eighth position on the ladder to qualify for the finals for the fist time since returning to the competition. The team won five of their nine matches, with two of their defeats coming by just four points. In week one of the finals, the Storm defeated the fifth-placed Illawarra Steelers 36–16 in Wollongong to progress to the semi finals. In that match against minor premiers the Parramatta Eels, the team were unable to overcome player unavailability and other issues, fighting back in the second half from a 16–4 half time deficit to lose 24–12. The squad featured local Victorian players, members of the Storm Junior Academy and Sunshine Coast Academy programs.

The Under-17s squad of Victorian junior rugby league players was not as successful, unable to win a match to finish last of the 17 team in the Harold Matthews Cup competition. The highlight of the season was the team's hard-fought draw against the Penrith Panthers in round six.

The Under-21s squad were crowned minor premiers of the Jersey Flegg Cup competition, finishing on top of the ladder with 17 wins and a draw from their 24 regular season matches. Melbourne scored 826 points for the season and conceded only 480, leading the competition in both categories.

2025 Jersey Flegg Cup
| Pos | Team | Pld | W | D | L | B | PF | PA | PD | Pts |
|---|---|---|---|---|---|---|---|---|---|---|
| 1 | Melbourne Storm | 24 | 17 | 1 | 6 | 2 | 826 | 480 | +346 | 39 |

Storm captain Preston Conn was awarded the competition's player of the year award at the NSWRL's Brad Fittler Medal awards night.

Melbourne progressed to the Jersey Flegg Cup Grand Final winning their major semi final 38–10 against the Cronulla-Sutherland Sharks at Leichhardt Oval.

Melbourne would be crowned premiers of the competition, winning the Grand Final 38–16 against the Penrith Panthers at CommBank Stadium, to win the club's first NSWRL junior representatives premiership title.

2025 Jersey Flegg Cup Grand Final

Sunday, 28 September
11:00 AEST (UTC+10)

| Melbourne Storm | 38 – 16 | Penrith Panthers |
|---|---|---|
| Tries: 6 Peel 7', 47'; Jennings 27'; Clarke 37'; Brettle 60'; Williams 79'; Goals: 7 Morris 8', 29', pen 33', 39', 48', 60', 80' (7/7); Sin bin: Bowden (yellow card) 63' to 73' | 1st: 20–10; 2nd: 18–6; Report | Tries: 3 Liddiard 19', 22'; Tuaoi 70'; Goals: 2 Liddiard 20', 70' (2/3); Sin bin: Moran (yellow card) 63' to 73' |

CommBank Stadium, Parramatta
Referee: Daniel Luttringer
Touch judges: Billy Greatbatch, Tom Stindl
Ingoal judges:Michael Ford, Mitch Pitschieder
Player of the Match: Dylan Brettle (Melbourne)

=== 2025 Jersey Flegg Cup Premiership Team ===
Melbourne Storm
| 2025 Jersey Flegg Cup Premiership Team | Interchange | Coach |
|---|---|---|
| 1 Hugo Peel – FB; 2 Amaziah Murga – WG; 3 Mitchell Jennings – CE; 4 Liam Williams – CE; 5 Siulagi Tuimalatu-Brown – WG; 6 Eli Morris – FE; 7 Dylan Brettle – HB; 8 K-CI Newton-Whare – PR; 9 Gabriel Satrick – HK; 10 Talas Abell – PR; 11 Preston Conn (c) – SR; 12 Zayvian Langkilde-Fale – SR; 13 Angus Hinchey – LK | 14 Jai Bowden; 15 Jordan Blundell; 16 Cooper Clarke; 21 Stanley Huen | Head coach: Mark Russell; Legend: (c) Captain(s); (vc) Vice-captain(s) |

== Awards ==
=== Trophy Cabinet ===
- Michael Moore Trophy (Round 6)
- Jersey Flegg Cup

=== Melbourne Storm Awards Night ===
Held at Ciel The Venue on Wednesday, 8 October.

- Cameron Smith Player of the Year: Xavier Coates
- Billy Slater Rookie of the Year: Ativalu Lisati
- Melbourne Storm Members' Player of Year: Eliesa Katoa
- Melbourne Storm Most Improved: Grant Anderson
- Melbourne Storm Best Back: Ryan Papenhuyzen
- Melbourne Storm Best Forward: Eliesa Katoa
- Cooper Cronk Feeder Club Player of the Year: Siulagi Tuimalatu-Brown
- Mick Moore Club Person of the Year: Harry Grant
- Chairman's Award: Eryn Dimopoulos
- Darren Bell Medal (Jersey Flegg Cup U21s Player of the Year): Preston Conn
- Melbourne Storm Academy Player of the Year: Siulagi Tuimalatu-Brown
- Best Try: Harry Grant (round 24 vs Penrith)
- Life Member Inductees: Bart Campbell, Matthew Tripp, Marc Brentnall, Aaron Bellamy

=== Junior representative awards ===
Held at AAMI Park in May, for members of the club's Harold Matthews Cup (U17s) and S.G. Ball Cup (U19s) teams:

- Greg Brentnall U19s Player of the Year: Cooper Clarke
- Best Back (U19s): Amaziah Murgha
- Best Forward (U19s): Lockyer-Azile Foliola
- U19s Players' Player: Amaziah Murgha
- Young Tonumaipea U17s Player of the Year: Jactin Samaeli
- Best Back (U17s): Texas Esera-Saluni
- Best Forward (U17s): Malachai Taupau
- U17s Players' Player: Texas Esera-Saluni
- Junior Representative Club Person of the Year: Arana Taepa

=== Dally M Awards Night ===
Held at Randwick Racecourse, Sydney on Wednesday, 1 October.

- Dally M Winger of the Year: Xavier Coates
- Dally M Second-row forward of the Year: Eliesa Katoa

=== Rugby League Players' Association Awards ===
- RLPA Winger of the Year: Xavier Coates
- RLPA Hooker of the Year: Harry Grant
- RLPA Second-Row Forward of the Year: Eliesa Katoa

=== Additional awards ===
- IRL Golden Boot Award: Harry Grant
- Fulton–Reilly Award: Cameron Munster
- Spirit of ANZAC Medal: Eliesa Katoa
- Ken Stephen Medal nominee: Eliesa Katoa
- FOGS Peter Jackson Memorial Award: Cameron Munster
- NSWRL Jersey Flegg Cup Player of the Year: Preston Conn
