= 2024 Melbourne Storm season =

NRL rugby league season

- NRL Rank: 1st (Minor Premiers)
- Play-off result: Runners-Up
- 2024 record: Wins: 19; losses: 5
- Points scored: For: 692; against: 449

Team information
- CEO: Justin Rodski
- Coach: Craig Bellamy
- Captain: Harry Grant (23 matches) Jahrome Hughes (3 matches) Ryan Papenhuyzen & Cameron Munster (co-captains — 1 match)
- Stadium: AAMI Park – 30,050
- Avg. attendance: 19,849 (Note: Home matches in Melbourne only)
- High attendance: 26,106 (Round 25) (Note: Regular season home matches in Melbourne only)

Top scorers
- Tries: Will Warbrick (15)
- Goals: Nick Meaney (106)
- Points: Nick Meaney (232)
← 2023	List of seasons	2025 →

The 2024 Melbourne Storm season was the 27th in the club's history, competing in the 2024 NRL season. The team was coached by Craig Bellamy, coaching the club for a 22nd consecutive season. Melbourne Storm appointed a new captain for the season, as Harry Grant replaced Christian Welch.

Melbourne qualified for an 11th NRL Grand Final, after ending the regular season as minor premiers to claim the J. J. Giltinan Shield.

In the decider, reigning champions Penrith defeated Melbourne 14–6 to claim their fourth consecutive premiership title.

== Season summary ==
- 12 January – Following much speculation, 2020 premiership player Justin Olam was released to join the Wests Tigers, with Shawn Blore joining the club. Blore had previously signed to join Melbourne in 2025.
- 7 February – The club announced a revamped leadership group, with Harry Grant replacing Christian Welch as club captain. Jahrome Hughes and Cameron Munster were appointed vice-captains, with Josh King, Ryan Papenhuyzen, and Tui Kamikamica the other members of the leadership group.
- 29 February – Victorian-raised fullback Sualauvi Fa'alogo signs a contract extension that will keep him in Melbourne until the end of the 2028 NRL season. The 20-year-old Fa'alogo was also promoted to the club's top-30 roster for this season as a result of the new contract.
- Round 1 – Missing Cameron Munster and Nelson Asofa-Solomona through injury, Melbourne hold reigning premiers Penrith Panthers scoreless to win 8–0 at AAMI Park. The victory was the club's 22nd consecutive round 1 victory, and ended a three-match losing streak against the Panthers.
- Round 2 – With seconds remaining, Xavier Coates scores a remarkable try for Melbourne to steal a 30–26 win against the New Zealand Warriors to retain the Michael Moore Trophy. Melbourne had trailed by eight points with three minutes remaining. It was the Storm's 15th consecutive win against the Warriors. Earlier Nick Meaney scored a try in his 50th match for the club, while Jahrome Hughes was later cited with a grade two contrary conduct charge for contact with the referee during play. Hughes later entered in an early guilty plea to avoid a two-match suspension, taking a one-match suspension instead.
- Round 5 – Following a bye, Cameron Munster makes his first appearance for the season, the first time the club's first choice spine players had featured together since round 18, 2022. Melbourne coming from behind to defeat the Brisbane Broncos 34–32 in a high-scoring match at AAMI Park, extending the club's unbeaten run at the venue to 12 matches.
- 9 April – Nick Meaney signs a new contract extension, keeping him at the club until the end of the 2026 season.
- Round 6 – With five minutes remaining, Shawn Blore scored his first try for the club to snatch a 16–14 win against the Canterbury-Bankstown Bulldogs. It was Melbourne's 13th consecutive win at AAMI Park, a streak stretching back to March 2023. Earlier in the match, Canterbury's Sam Hughes and Melbourne's Ryan Papenhuyzen were sent to the sin bin in separate incidents. Papenhuyzen's sin bin was his first in the NRL, and he was also cited by the NRL match review for the first time for an alleged hip-drop tackle on former Storm player Josh Addo-Carr.
- 27 April – While playing for feeder club Brisbane Tigers, young playmaker Jonah Pezet suffered a season-ending knee injury.
- Round 9 – Cameron Munster (200 games) and Christian Welch (150 games) celebrate milestones as Melbourne extend their winning streak to five straight wins in a tight 22–20 victory over the Gold Coast Titans. The Storm had scored four straight tries in the first half, but the loss of Ryan Papenhuyzen to a broken leg put them on the back foot during the second half, with a penalty goal the only points scored by Melbourne after the break.
- 10 May – Coach Craig Bellamy confirms that he will remain with the club for the 2025 season, extending his tenure into a 23rd season.
- Round 10 – Cronulla end Melbourne's five-match winning streak leaving AAMI Park victorious 25–18, the Storm's first defeat at AAMI Park in over a year. Storm captain Harry Grant is controversially sent to the sin bin late in the first half by referee Grant Atkins, and is later charged with a dangerous contact (grade 1) charge by the NRL's match review committee. Grant later pleads not guilty at the NRL Judiciary and is found not guilty.
- Round 11 – The club wins their Magic Round match for the first time since 2021, with a stirring second half performance to defeat the Parramatta Eels 48–16. Harry Grant and Reimis Smith both score doubles. Cameron Munster leaves the field late in the first half after re-injuring the groin issue he first injured in preseason. It is later announced that he suffered a tear in the adductor tendon and will miss at least 8–10 weeks.
- 24 May – Aaron Pene is released by the club to take up an opportunity with the Leigh Leopards in the Super League.
- Round 14 – After taking top spot on the NRL ladder during the club's second bye week, Melbourne retain the competition lead with a 36–24 win over the Knights at AAMI Park. Nick Meaney and Tyran Wishart both scoring two tries.
- Round 15 – Melbourne retain the Michael Moore Trophy for the 16th straight match, beating the Warriors 38–24 at a sold out Go Media Stadium.
- Round 17 – Xavier Coates suffers a serious hamstring injury in his 50th appearance for the club, as Melbourne extended their winning streak to four matches with a 16–6 win over the Canberra Raiders at a wet AAMI Park. Jack Howarth scored his first career try before also leaving the field due to injury.
- 3 July – Alec MacDonald and Grant Anderson sign contract extensions to stay with the club. Anderson signs on until the end of the 2025 season, with MacDonald extending until the end of the 2028 season.
- 8 July – Melbourne Storm coaching coordinator Jason Ryles was announced as the Parramatta Eels coach, to start in 2025. Ryles will be the third former member of the Storm's coaching staff to coach that club. On 17 July, Melbourne released Ryles from his role at the club in order for him to start at Parramatta before the end of the 2024 season.
- Round 20 – Melbourne returned from a bye to win their sixth straight match, a dominant 24–8 win over the Sydney Roosters. Nick Meaney kicked his 200th goal for the club, while Lazarus Vaalepu made his NRL debut. Joe Chan was sin binned during the second half and later charged by the NRL Judiciary for a tackle on Victor Radley.
- 31 July – Reimis Smith was granted an immediate release to join Catalans Dragons ahead of the closure of the Super League signings window. Smith departed after 68 matches for Melbourne since joining the club ahead of the 2021 season.
- Round 22 – St. George-Illawarra Dragons end a 25-year hoodoo in Melbourne, snapping the Storm's seven match winning streak, by winning 18–16 at AAMI Park. It was the Dragons first win in Melbourne since 1999.
- 8 August – Jahrome Hughes was voted the Rugby League Players Association player of the month for July, the second time he received the award after winning in April.
- 14 August – Former Melbourne Storm players Cameron Smith, Billy Slater, Cooper Cronk, and Greg Inglis are all announced as inductees to the National Rugby League Hall of Fame.

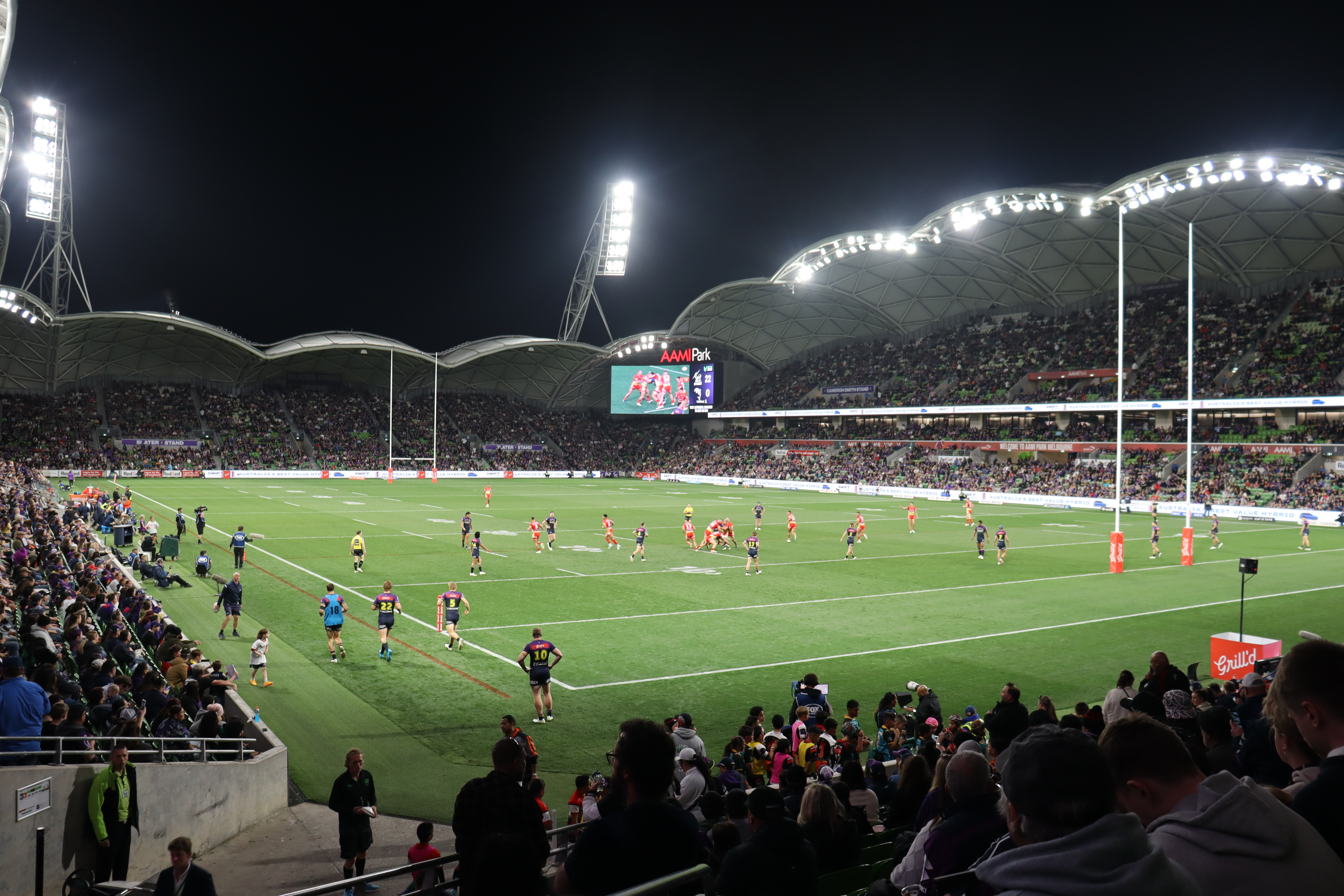
The Storm's minor premiership deciding victory over the Dolphins at AAMI Park.

- Round 25 – Melbourne secured the J. J. Giltinan Shield as minor premiers following a dominant 48–6 win over the Dolphins. Melbourne celebrated with Nelson Asofa-Solomona making his 200th appearance for the club, the 10th player to reach that mark with the club. It was the sixth time Melbourne was recognised as the competition's minor premiers.
- Round 26 – Without 11 regulars, Melbourne suffer their fifth defeat for the season, losing 38–30 against the North Queensland Cowboys. Three players made their NRL debuts for the Storm, with Ativalu Lisati scoring a try in his debut match. Fullback Ryan Papenhuyzen left the field with an injury, which would keep him out for the club's next match.
- Round 27 – Jahrome Hughes scored a hat-trick of tries and set up two more tries with Melbourne ending the regular season with a 50–12 win over the Brisbane Broncos at Suncorp Stadium. Will Warbrick also scored a hat-trick to end the regular season with 13 tries.
- Qualifying final – Melbourne progress to a 16th preliminary final on the back of a dominant second half against the fourth-placed Cronulla Sharks at AAMI Park. Leading 14–10 at half time, the Storm shut-out the visitors on the back of a first career hat-trick for captain Harry Grant to win 37–10.
- 20 September – The club announced the signing of New Zealand rugby sevens player Moses Leo to join the club ahead of the 2026 season on a two-year contract.
- Preliminary final – Melbourne progress to the club's 11th appearance in the NRL Grand Final, defeating the Sydney Roosters 48–18 at AAMI Park. Jahrome Hughes scored a hat-trick, while Ryan Papenhuyzen and Cameron Munster both scored doubles. The attendance of 29,213 was the third highest attendance for a rugby league match at the venue. In the first minute of the match, Nelson Asofa-Solomona was sent to the sin bin by referee Grant Atkins for a tackle on Roosters forward Lindsay Collins. Asofa-Solomona was later charged by the NRL Judiciary with a grade three careless high tackle charge which carried a minimum four-match suspension.
- 30 September – Nelson Asofa-Solomona's bid to downgrade his careless high tackle charge failed as the NRL Judiciary handed down a five-match suspension. Panel members Bob Lindner and Paul Simpkins were unswayed by the arguments of Melbourne's legal counsel Nick Ghabar.

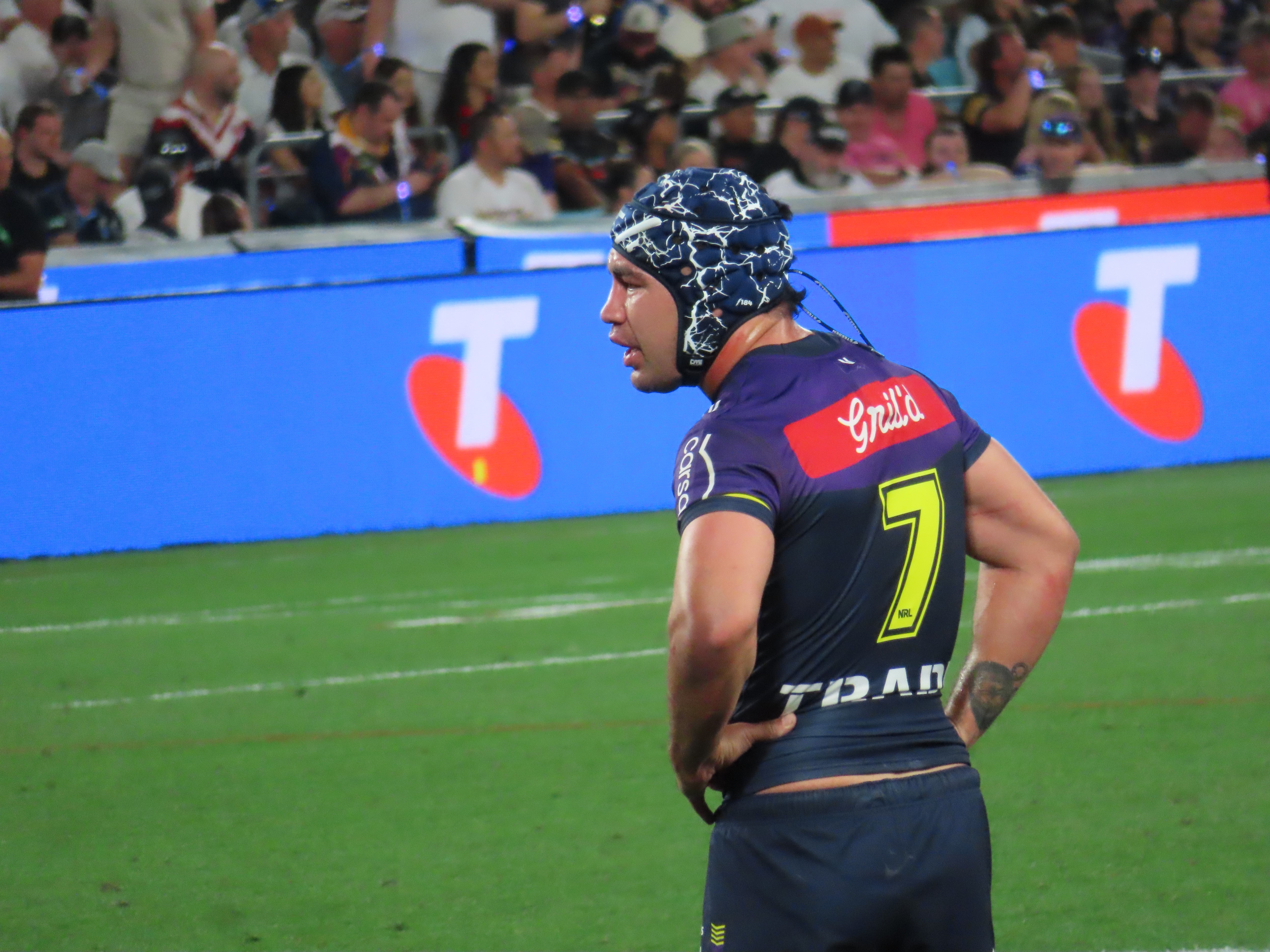
Jahrome Hughes won the Dally M Medal and the Cameron Smith Player of the Year Award following a dominant season.

- 2 October – At the 2024 Dally M Awards, Storm halfback won the Dally M Medal as player of the year, polling 62 points to win by one point ahead of Roosters fullback James Tedesco. Hughes was also named the Dally M Halfback of the Year. Joining Hughes in the Dally M Team of the Year were Harry Grant (hooker) and Eliesa Katoa (second row). Craig Bellamy was awarded his seventh Dally M Coach of the Year award. For his final minute wonder try in round 2 against the New Zealand Warriors, winger Xavier Coates was awarded the Peter Frilingos Headline Moment and the Dally M Try of the Year.

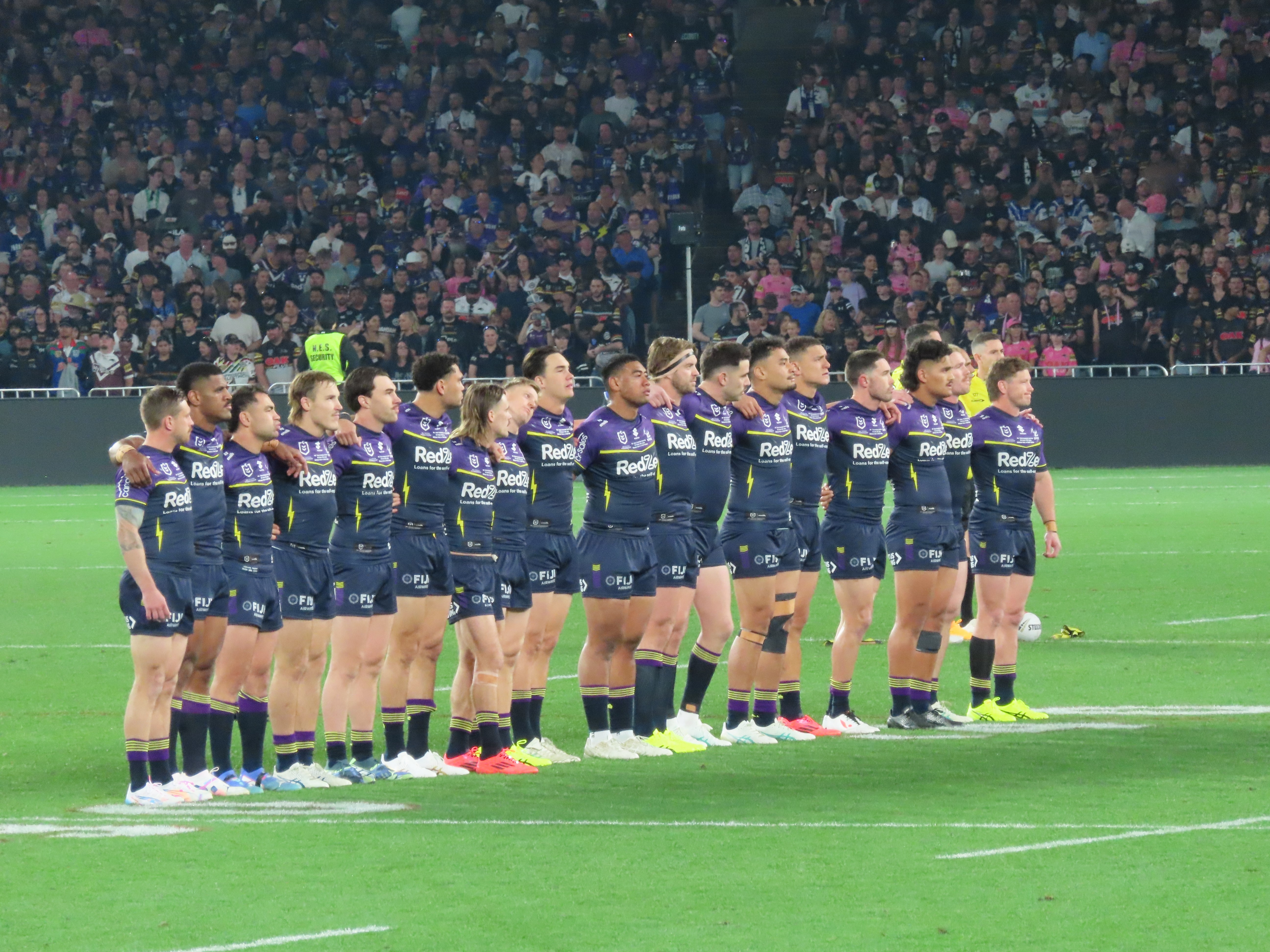
Melbourne Storm players before the start of the 2024 NRL Grand Final

- Grand Final – Despite scoring the first try of the match through captain Harry Grant midway through the first half, Melbourne struggled to overcome the defence of the Penrith Panthers in the Grand Final. The Panthers defending their title to win their fourth consecutive premiership, defeating Melbourne 14–6. Penrith second-row forward Liam Martin was awarded the Clive Churchill Medal. There was some controversy during the second half when Jack Howarth was denied a try by the officials, and Cameron Munster was accused of biting the arm of Paul Alamoti. Munster was put on report by referee Ashley Klein, but not charged.
- 23 October – It was announced that club captain Harry Grant had taken up the option to extend his contract with the club until the end of the 2026 season.
- 13 November – Long-time football manager Frank Ponissi re-signs with the club for a further five seasons after speculation he could leave the club for the Brisbane Broncos or switch codes to the Collingwood Football Club.
- 15 November – Harry Grant was shortlisted for the 2024 IRL Golden Boot Award following his performances for Australia in representative matches.

=== Milestone games ===
Round	Player	Milestone
Round 1	Trent Loiero	50th match
Round 3	Shawn Blore	Storm debut
Round 9	Cameron Munster	200th match
Round 9	Christian Welch	150th match
Round 12	Tui Kamikamica	100th match
Round 20	Lazarus Vaalepu	NRL debut
Round 21	Melbourne Storm	700th match
Round 22	Shawn Blore	50th match
Round 24	Josh King	150th match
Round 25	Nelson Asofa-Solomona	200th match
Round 25	Tyran Wishart	50th match
Round 26	Keagan Russell-Smith	NRL debut
Round 26	Ativalu Lisati	NRL debut
Round 26	Tristan Powell	NRL debut
Preliminary final	Harry Grant	100th match
Grand Final	Jahrome Hughes	150th match

== Fixtures ==
=== Pre-season Challenge ===
Date	Rd	Opponent	Venue	Result	Mel.	Opp.	Tries	Goals	Field goals	Ref
15 February	Trial	Canterbury-Bankstown Bulldogs	Belmore Sports Ground, Sydney	Lost	12	24	D Ieremia, R Papenhuyzen	J Pezet 2/2		
24 February	Trial	Newcastle Knights	Churchill Park, Lautoka, Fiji	Won	28	10	E Katoa, X Coates, J Pezet, Y Tonumaipea, H Grant	N Meaney 1/2, J Pezet 2/2, T Stewart 1/1		

=== Regular season ===
==== Result by round ====
Round	1	2	3	4	5	6	7	8	9	10	11	12	13	14	15	16	17	18	19	20	21	22	23	24	25	26	27
Ground	H	H	A	–	H	H	A	H	A	H	N	A	–	H	A	A	H	A	–	H	A	H	A	A	H	A	A
Result	W	W	L	B	W	W	W	W	W	L	W	L	B	W	W	W	W	W	B	W	W	L	W	W	W	L	W
Position	7	5	8	5	3	2	2	2	2	3	2	3	1	1	1	1	1	1	1	1	1	1	1	1	1	1	1
Points	2	4	4	6	8	10	12	14	16	16	18	18	20	22	24	26	28	30	32	34	36	36	38	40	42	42	44

Source: National Rugby League
A = Away; H = Home; N = Neutral; B = Bye; W = Win; D = Draw; L = Loss

==== Matches ====
- (g.p.) – Golden Point extra time
- (pen) – Penalty try

Date	Rd	Opponent	H/A	Venue	Result	Mel.	Opp.	Tries	Goals	Field goals	Ref
8 March	1	Penrith Panthers	Home	AAMI Park, Melbourne	Won	8	0	R Smith	N Meaney 2/2		
16 March	2	New Zealand Warriors	Home	AAMI Park, Melbourne	Won	30	26	R Papenhuyzen (2), W Warbrick, N Meaney, X Coates	N Meaney 5/6	J Pezet 0/1	
24 March	3 (Note: Multicultural Round)	Newcastle Knights	Away	McDonald Jones Stadium, Newcastle	Lost	12	14	R Papenhuyzen, T Wishart	N Meaney 2/2	R Papenhuyzen 0/1	
30 March	4	Bye									
4 April	5	Brisbane Broncos	Home	AAMI Park, Melbourne	Won	34	32	E Katoa (2), X Coates, W Warbrick, T Wishart, J Hughes	N Meaney 5/6		
12 April	6	Canterbury-Bankstown Bulldogs	Home	AAMI Park, Melbourne	Won	16	14	R Papenhuyzen, R Smith, S Blore	N Meaney 2/3		
18 April	7	Sydney Roosters	Away	Allianz Stadium, Sydney	Won	18	12	J Hughes, E Katoa, X Coates	N Meaney 3/3		
25 April	8 (Note: ANZAC Round)	South Sydney Rabbitohs	Home	AAMI Park, Melbourne	Won	54	20	X Coates (3), R Papenhuyzen (2), W Warbrick, H Grant, C Munster, T Wishart, J Chan	N Meaney 7/10	R Papenhuyzen 0/1	
4 May	9	Gold Coast Titans	Away	Cbus Super Stadium, Gold Coast	Won	22	20	C Munster, W Warbrick, R Papenhuyzen, S Fa'alogo	N Meaney 3/6		
11 May	10	Cronulla-Sutherland Sharks	Home	AAMI Park, Melbourne	Lost	18	25	E Katoa, R Smith, T Wishart	N Meaney 3/4		
19 May	11 (Note: Magic Round)	Parramatta Eels	Home	Suncorp Stadium, Brisbane	Won	48	16	H Grant (2), R Smith (2), T Kamikamica, W Warbrick, X Coates, E Katoa	N Meaney 8/9		
24 May	12 (Note: Indigenous Round)	Manly Warringah Sea Eagles	Away	4 Pines Park, Sydney	Lost	20	26	E Katoa, N Meaney, J Hughes	N Meaney 4/4		
1 June	13	Bye									
9 June	14	Newcastle Knights	Home	AAMI Park, Melbourne	Won	36	28	N Meaney (2), T Wishart (2), J Hughes, X Coates	N Meaney 6/7		
15 June	15	New Zealand Warriors	Away	Go Media Stadium, Auckland	Won	38	24	S Fa'alogo (2), E Katoa, G Anderson, D Ieremia, N Meaney, X Coates	N Meaney 5/7		
21 June	16	Dolphins	Away	Suncorp Stadium, Brisbane	Won	30	24	R Papenhuyzen, T Wishart, J Hughes, W Warbrick, J King	N Meaney 5/6		
29 June	17	Canberra Raiders	Home	AAMI Park, Melbourne	Won	16	6	J King, S Blore, J Howarth	T Wishart 2/4		
6 July	18	Wests Tigers	Away	Leichhardt Oval, Sydney	Won	40	28	S Fa'alogo (2), E Katoa, R Papenhuyzen, W Warbrick, G Anderson, T Wishart	T Wishart 6/8		
13 July	19	Bye									
20 July	20	Sydney Roosters	Home	AAMI Park, Melbourne	Won	24	8	G Anderson (2), J Howarth, S Fa'alogo	N Meaney 4/6		
26 July	21	Parramatta Eels	Away	CommBank Stadium, Sydney	Won	32	14	G Anderson, H Grant, W Warbrick, T Wishart, R Papenhuyzen	N Meaney 6/6		
3 August	22 (Note: Women in League Round)	St. George Illawarra Dragons	Home	AAMI Park, Melbourne	Lost	16	18	H Grant (2), G Anderson	N Meaney 2/3		
8 August	23	South Sydney Rabbitohs	Away	Accor Stadium, Sydney	Won	28	16	W Warbrick (2), N Asofa-Solomona, R Papenhuyzen, G Anderson	N Meaney 4/6		
15 August	24	Penrith Panthers	Away	BlueBet Stadium, Sydney	Won	24	22	E Katoa (2), G Anderson, T Wishart	N Meaney 4/5		
24 August	25	Dolphins	Home	AAMI Park, Melbourne	Won	48	6	S Fa'alogo (2), H Grant, A MacDonald, J Howarth, J Hughes, E Katoa, N Asofa-Solomona, J King	N Meaney 6/9		
29 August	26	North Queensland Cowboys	Away	Queensland Country Bank Stadium, Townsville	Lost	30	38	T Wishart (2), L Vaapelu, A MacDonald, A Lisati	T Wishart 5/6		
5 September	27	Brisbane Broncos	Away	Suncorp Stadium, Brisbane	Won	50	12	W Warbrick (3), J Hughes (3), E Katoa, H Grant, X Coates	N Meaney 7/9		

Fixture notes:

=== Finals ===
Qualifying final

Saturday, 14 September
16:05 AEST (UTC+10)

Melbourne Storm	37 – 10	Cronulla-Sutherland Sharks
Tries: 6 Grant 52', 72', 78'; Warbrick 25', 63'; Munster 2'; Goals: 6 Meaney 3', 27', pen 30', 54', 73', pen 77' (6/8); Field goals: 1 Papenhuyzen 80'	1st: 14–10; 2nd: 23–0; Report	Tries: 2 Katoa 13'; Nikora 40'; Goals: 1 Hynes 40' (1/2)

AAMI Park, Melbourne
Attendance: 26,326
Referee: Gerard Sutton
Bunker: Chris Butler
Touch judges: Michael Wise, Dave Munro

Preliminary final

Friday, 27 September
19:50 AEST (UTC+10)

Melbourne Storm	48 – 18	Sydney Roosters
Tries: 8 Hughes 26', 39', 53'; Papenhuyzen 13', 64'; Munster 75', 80'; Howarth 31'; Goals: 8 Meaney 15', 28', 40', pen 44', 55', 65' (6/7); Grant 76' (1/1); Wishart 80' (1/1); Field goals: 0 Papenhuyzen (0/1); Sin bin: 1 Asofa-Solomona (yellow card) 1' to 11'	1st: 22–6; 2nd: 26–12; Report	Tries: 3 Tupou 9'; May 47'; Butcher 49'; Goals: 3 Sua'ali'i pen 4', 48', 50' (3/4)

AAMI Park, Melbourne
Attendance: 29,213
Referee: Grant Atkins
Bunker: Wyatt Raymond
Touch judges: Phil Henderson, Dave Munro

2024 NRL Grand Final

Sunday, 6 October
19:30 AEDT (UTC+11)

Melbourne Storm	6 – 14	Penrith Panthers
Tries: 1 Grant 23'; Goals: 1 Meaney 24' (1/1)	1st: 6–8; 2nd: 0–6; Report	Tries: 3 Turuva 27'; Martin 39'; Alamoti 61'; Goals: 1 Cleary 40' (1/3)

Accor Stadium, Sydney
Attendance: 80,156
Referee: Ashley Klein
Bunker: Grant Atkins
Touch judges: Dave Munro, Chris Sutton
Clive Churchill Medal: Liam Martin (Penrith)

== Ladder ==
Pos	Team	Pld	W	D	L	B	PF	PA	PD	Pts	Qualification
1	Melbourne Storm	24	19	0	5	3	692	449	+243	44	Advance to finals series
2	Penrith Panthers (P)	24	17	0	7	3	580	394	+186	40	Advance to finals series
3	Sydney Roosters	24	16	0	8	3	738	463	+275	38	Advance to finals series
4	Cronulla-Sutherland Sharks	24	16	0	8	3	653	431	+222	38	Advance to finals series
5	North Queensland Cowboys	24	15	0	9	3	657	568	+89	36	Advance to finals series
6	Canterbury-Bankstown Bulldogs	24	14	0	10	3	529	433	+96	34	Advance to finals series
7	Manly Warringah Sea Eagles	24	13	1	10	3	634	521	+113	33	Advance to finals series
8	Newcastle Knights	24	12	0	12	3	470	510	−40	30	Advance to finals series
9	Canberra Raiders	24	12	0	12	3	474	601	−127	30	
10	Dolphins	24	11	0	13	3	577	578	−1	28	
11	St. George Illawarra Dragons	24	11	0	13	3	508	634	−126	28	
12	Brisbane Broncos	24	10	0	14	3	537	607	−70	26	
13	New Zealand Warriors	24	9	1	14	3	512	574	−62	25	
14	Gold Coast Titans	24	8	0	16	3	488	656	−168	22	
15	Parramatta Eels	24	7	0	17	3	561	716	−155	20	
16	South Sydney Rabbitohs	24	7	0	17	3	494	682	−188	20	
17	Wests Tigers	24	6	0	18	3	463	750	−287	18	

Source: National Rugby League
(P) Premiers

== Coaching staff ==
- Craig Bellamy – Head Coach
- Marc Brentnall – Assistant Coach
- Aaron Bellamy – Assistant Coach
- Ryan Hinchcliffe – Assistant Coach
- Todd Lowrie – Development Coach
- Jason Ryles – Coaching Coordinator (until 17 July)

== 2024 squad ==
List current as of 2 October 2024

Cap	Nat.	Player name	Position	First Storm game	Previous First Grade RL club (Note: Previous First Grade RL club: This column denotes the previous RL club the player was signed to and played first grade RL for. If they are yet to debut then this is stipulated. If they were merely signed to the club but did not play then it is not counted)
154	(Samoa)	Young Tonumaipea	WG, FB	2014	(Australia) Melbourne Storm
160	(Australia)	Cameron Munster	FE, FB	2014	(Australia) Melbourne Storm
166	(New Zealand)	Nelson Asofa-Solomona	SR, PR	2015	(Australia) Melbourne Storm
167	(Australia)	Christian Welch	SR, PR	2015	(Australia) Melbourne Storm
181	(Fiji)	Tui Kamikamica	SR, PR	2017	(Australia) Melbourne Storm
184	(New Zealand)	Jahrome Hughes	FE, FB	2017	(Australia) North Queensland Cowboys
188	(Australia)	Harry Grant	HK	2018	(Australia) Melbourne Storm
193	(Samoa)	Marion Seve	WG	2019	(Australia) Melbourne Storm
194	(Australia)	Ryan Papenhuyzen	FB	2019	(Australia) Melbourne Storm
201	(Australia)	Chris Lewis	SR	2020	(Australia) Melbourne Storm
207	(New Zealand)	Aaron Pene	PR	2020	(Australia) New Zealand Warriors
210	(New Zealand)	Reimis Smith	WG	2021	(Australia) Canterbury Bulldogs
212	(Australia)	Trent Loiero	SR	2021	(Australia) Melbourne Storm
213	(Samoa)	Dean Ieremia	WG	2021	(Australia) Melbourne Storm
215	(Cook Islands)	Tepai Moeroa	SR, LK	2021	(Australia) Parramatta Eels
217	(Papua New Guinea)	Xavier Coates	WG	2022	(Australia) Brisbane Broncos
218	(Australia)	Nick Meaney	FB	2022	(Australia) Canterbury Bulldogs
219	(Australia)	Josh King	PR	2022	(Australia) Newcastle Knights
220	(Australia)	Tyran Wishart	FE, HK	2022	(Australia) Melbourne Storm
221	(Australia)	Alec MacDonald	LK	2022	(Australia) Melbourne Storm
222	(Australia)	Grant Anderson	CE	2022	(Australia) Melbourne Storm
225	(New Zealand)	William Warbrick	CE, WG	2023	(Australia) Melbourne Storm
226	(Tonga)	Eliesa Katoa	SR	2023	New Zealand Warriors
227	(Australia)	Bronson Garlick	LK, SR	2023	(Australia) Melbourne Storm
228	(Australia)	Kane Bradley	WG, CE	2023	(Australia) North Queensland Cowboys
229	(Australia)	Jonah Pezet	HB	2023	(Australia) Melbourne Storm
231	(Samoa)	Sualauvi Fa'alogo	FB, WG	2023	(Australia) Melbourne Storm
232	(Australia)	Jack Howarth	SR	2023	(Australia) Melbourne Storm
233	(France)	Joe Chan	SR	2023	(France) Catalans Dragons
234	(Australia)	Shawn Blore	SR	2024	(Australia) Wests Tigers
235	(Samoa)	Lazarus Vaalepu	PR	2024	(Australia) Melbourne Storm
236	(Australia)	Keagan Russell-Smith	FE, HB	2024	(Australia) Melbourne Storm
237	(Samoa)	Ativalu Lisati	PR	2024	(Australia) Melbourne Storm
238	(Australia)	Tristan Powell	PR	2024	(Australia) Melbourne Storm
–	(Australia)	Ammaron Gudgeon	FB	Yet to debut	(Australia) Melbourne Storm
–	(Australia)	Coby Williamson	CE	Yet to debut	(Australia) Melbourne Storm

== Player movements ==
Losses

- Tom Eisenhuth to St George Illawarra Dragons
- Cole Geyer to Burleigh Bears
- Jordan Grant to Penrith Panthers
- George Jennings to Released
- Jayden Nikorima to Catalan Dragons
- Justin Olam to Wests Tigers
- Aaron Pene to Leigh Leopards (midseason)
- Tariq Sims to Catalan Dragons
- Reimis Smith to Catalan Dragons (midseason)

Gains

- Shawn Blore from Wests Tigers
- Ativalu Lisati from Penrith Panthers

== Representative honours ==
This table lists all players who have played a representative match in 2024.

- (C) = Captain
- (vc) = Vice-captain

Player	NRL All Star match	State of Origin 1	State of Origin 2 (Note: Trent Loiero was selected as a reserve for Queensland.)	State of Origin 3 (Note: Trent Loiero was selected as a reserve for Queensland.)	Internationals/Pacific Championships
Shawn Blore	—N/a	—N/a	—N/a	—N/a	Samoa
Xavier Coates	—N/a	Queensland	Queensland	—N/a	Australia
Harry Grant	—N/a	Queensland	Queensland	Queensland	Australia (vc)
Jack Howarth	Māori	—N/a	—N/a	—N/a	—N/a
Jahrome Hughes	Māori	—N/a	—N/a	—N/a	~~New Zealand~~ (Note: After selection for the Pacific Championships, Hughes was ruled out of the tournament due to injury.)
Tui Kamikamica	—N/a	—N/a	—N/a	—N/a	Fiji (c)
Eliesa Katoa	—N/a	—N/a	—N/a	—N/a	Tonga
Tepai Moeroa	—N/a	—N/a	—N/a	—N/a	Cook Islands
Lazarus Vaalepu	—N/a	—N/a	—N/a	—N/a	Samoa
Will Warbrick	—N/a	—N/a	—N/a	—N/a	New Zealand
Tyran Wishart	—N/a	—N/a	—N/a	—N/a	Prime Minister's XIII

== Statistics ==
This table contains playing statistics for all Melbourne Storm players to have played in the 2024 NRL season.

- Table updated as at end of season
- Statistics sources:

Name	Appearances	Tries	Goals	Field goals	Points
Grant Anderson	14	8	0	0	32
Nelson Asofa-Solomona	19	2	0	0	8
Shawn Blore	24	2	0	0	8
Kane Bradley	4	0	0	0	0
Joe Chan	11	1	0	0	4
Xavier Coates	16	10	0	0	40
Sualauvi Fa'alogo	14	8	0	0	32
Bronson Garlick	4	0	0	0	0
Harry Grant	23	12	1	0	50
Jack Howarth	16	4	0	0	16
Jahrome Hughes	23	12	0	0	48
Dean Ieremia	2	1	0	0	4
Tui Kamikamica	22	1	0	0	4
Eliesa Katoa	25	12	0	0	48
Josh King	26	3	0	0	12
Chris Lewis	4	0	0	0	0
Ativalu Lisati	1	1	0	0	4
Trent Loiero	26	0	0	0	0
Alec MacDonald	22	2	0	0	8
Nick Meaney	24	5	106	0	232
Tepai Moeroa	4	0	0	0	0
Cameron Munster	17	5	0	0	20
Ryan Papenhuyzen	20	13	0	1	53
Jonah Pezet	3	0	0	0	0
Tristan Powell	1	0	0	0	0
Keagan Russell-Smith	1	0	0	0	0
Marion Seve	1	0	0	0	0
Reimis Smith	12	5	0	0	20
Young Tonumaipea	1	0	0	0	0
Lazarus Vaalepu	7 (Note: Vaalepu was an unused interchange player in the round 24 match against the Panthers. He does not gain an official appearance for this match.)	1	0	0	4
William Warbrick	25	15	0	0	60
Christian Welch	20	0	0	0	0
Tyran Wishart	26 (Note: Wishart was an unused interchange player in the round 7 match against the Roosters. He does not gain an official appearance for this match.)	12	14	0	76
33 players used	—	135	121	0/1	783

=== Scorers ===
Most points in a game: 20

- Round 14 – Nick Meaney (2 tries, 6 goals) vs Newcastle Knights

Most tries in a game: 3

- Round 8 – Xavier Coates vs South Sydney Rabbitohs
- Round 27 – Will Warbrick vs Brisbane Broncos
- Round 27 – Jahrome Hughes vs Brisbane Broncos
- Qualifying final – Harry Grant vs Cronulla Sharks
- Preliminary final – Jahrome Hughes vs Sydney Roosters

=== Winning games ===
Highest score in a winning game: 54 points

- Round 8 vs South Sydney Rabbitohs

Lowest score in a winning game: 8 points

- Round 1 vs Penrith Panthers

Greatest winning margin: 42 points

- Round 25 vs Dolphins

Greatest number of games won consecutively: 7

- Round 14 – Round 21

=== Losing games ===
Highest score in a losing game: 30 points

- Round 26 vs North Queensland Cowboys

Lowest score in a losing game: 6 points

- Grand Final vs Penrith Panthers

Greatest losing margin: 8 points

- Round 26 vs North Queensland Cowboys
- Grand Final vs Penrith Panthers

Greatest number of games lost consecutively: 1

== Jerseys ==
Home	Away

In November 2023, Melbourne Storm announced a new sponsorship and apparel partnership agreement with Irish sportswear company O'Neills, ending the club's relationship with British sportswear company Castore, before the end of the original five-year deal that had been announced in December 2020.

Home

Revealed in November 2023, the 2024 home jersey is navy blue with a purple yoke and sleeves. There are bright yellow lightning bolt designs on the side panels, and a revised Big V logo at the top of the rear of the jersey as a continuation of the Our Home, Victoria acknowledgment which began during the 2020 season to honour Storm's home state. This jersey will be worn with navy blue shorts and socks.

Away

The away jersey, worn when the home jersey creates a clash with the opposition, is a similar design to the home jersey, with white replacing the navy blue base colour. This jersey will be worn with purple shorts, with white socks.

ANZAC Day

Revealed in early April, Melbourne's jersey worn on ANZAC Day featured the team colours of navy blue and purple in a zig-zag pattern that paid homage to design elements at the Shrine of Remembrance in Melbourne. The design mimics the sporadic design of trenches dug by soldiers, as well as the Dazzle camouflage employed by Royal Australian Navy vessels in World War I and World War II.

Indigenous

Titled "Kerrbooonool" meaning connection in Woiwurrung language, the club's 2024 Indigenous jersey was designed by Letitia Smith, cousin of Reimis Smith. The design includes the hand and footprints of the club's Indigenous players, the Yarra river and a gathering circle. The inner lining of the collar pays tribute to Tony Mundine, former Australian boxer and grandfather of Reimis Smith. The jersey was worn in the NRL's Indigenous Round against Manly in May, and also against Canberra in June.

== Awards ==
=== Trophy Cabinet ===
- J. J. Giltinan Shield
- Michael Moore Trophy (Round 2 & 15)

=== Melbourne Storm Awards Night ===
Held at Crown Melbourne's Palladium Ballroom on Tuesday, 8 October:

- Cameron Smith Player of the Year: Jahrome Hughes
- Billy Slater Rookie of the Year: Jack Howarth
- Melbourne Storm Members' Player of Year: Jahrome Hughes
- Melbourne Storm Most Improved: Trent Loiero
- Melbourne Storm Best Back: Will Warbrick
- Melbourne Storm Best Forward: Harry Grant
- Cooper Cronk Feeder Club Player of the Year: Lazarus Vaalepu
- Mick Moore Club Person of the Year: Ross Patison
- Chairman's Award: Andrew McGuinness
- Darren Bell Medal (Jersey Flegg Cup U21s Player of the Year): Angus Hinchey
- Melbourne Storm Academy Player of the Year: Angus Hinchey
- Best Try: Xavier Coates (Round 2 vs Warriors)
- Life Member Inductees: Christian Welch, Nelson Asofa-Solomona, Cameron Munster, Ashley Tucker

=== Junior representative awards ===
Held at AAMI Park in April, for members of the club's Harold Matthews Cup (U17s) and S.G. Ball Cup (U19s) teams:

- Junior Representatives Player of the Year: Hugo Peel (St Kevin's College)
- Greg Brentnall U19s Player of the Year: Chase Paterson (Storm Sunshine Coast Academy)
- Best Back (U19s): Ioane Lui (Sunbury Tigers)
- Best Forward (U19s): Harrison Hill (Storm Brisbane Hub)
- Young Tonumaipea U17s Player of the Year: Waka Hammond (Casey Warriors)
- Best Back (U17s): Matthew Kereti (Altona Roosters)
- Best Forward (U17s): Lockyer-Azile Foliolo (Sunbury Tigers)

=== Dally M Awards Night ===
Held at Randwick Racecourse, Sydney on Wednesday, 2 October.

- Dally M Medal: Jahrome Hughes
- Dally M Coach of the Year: Craig Bellamy
- Dally M Halfback of the Year: Jahrome Hughes
- Dally M Hooker of the Year: Harry Grant
- Dally M Second-row forward of the Year: Eliesa Katoa
- Peter Frilingos Headline Moment: Xavier Coates' try
- Dally M NRL Try of the Year: Xavier Coates (Round 2 vs New Zealand Warriors)

=== Rugby League Players' Association Awards ===
- The Players' Champion: Jahrome Hughes
- NRL Academic Award and Academic Team of the Year: Christian Welch
- Pasifika Leadership & Excellence Award: Tui Kamikamica
- RLPA Halfback of the Year: Jahrome Hughes
- RLPA Hooker of the Year: Harry Grant
- RLPA Second-Row Forward of the Year: Eliesa Katoa

=== Additional awards ===
- Spirit of ANZAC Medal: Cameron Munster
- Ken Stephen Medal nominee and NRL Community team of the Year: Young Tonumaipea
- Donate Life Most Courageous Player Award: Trent Loiero
- National Rugby League Hall of Fame Inductees: Cameron Smith, Billy Slater, Cooper Cronk, and Greg Inglis
