= Keagan Russell-Smith =

Australian rugby league player (born 2003)

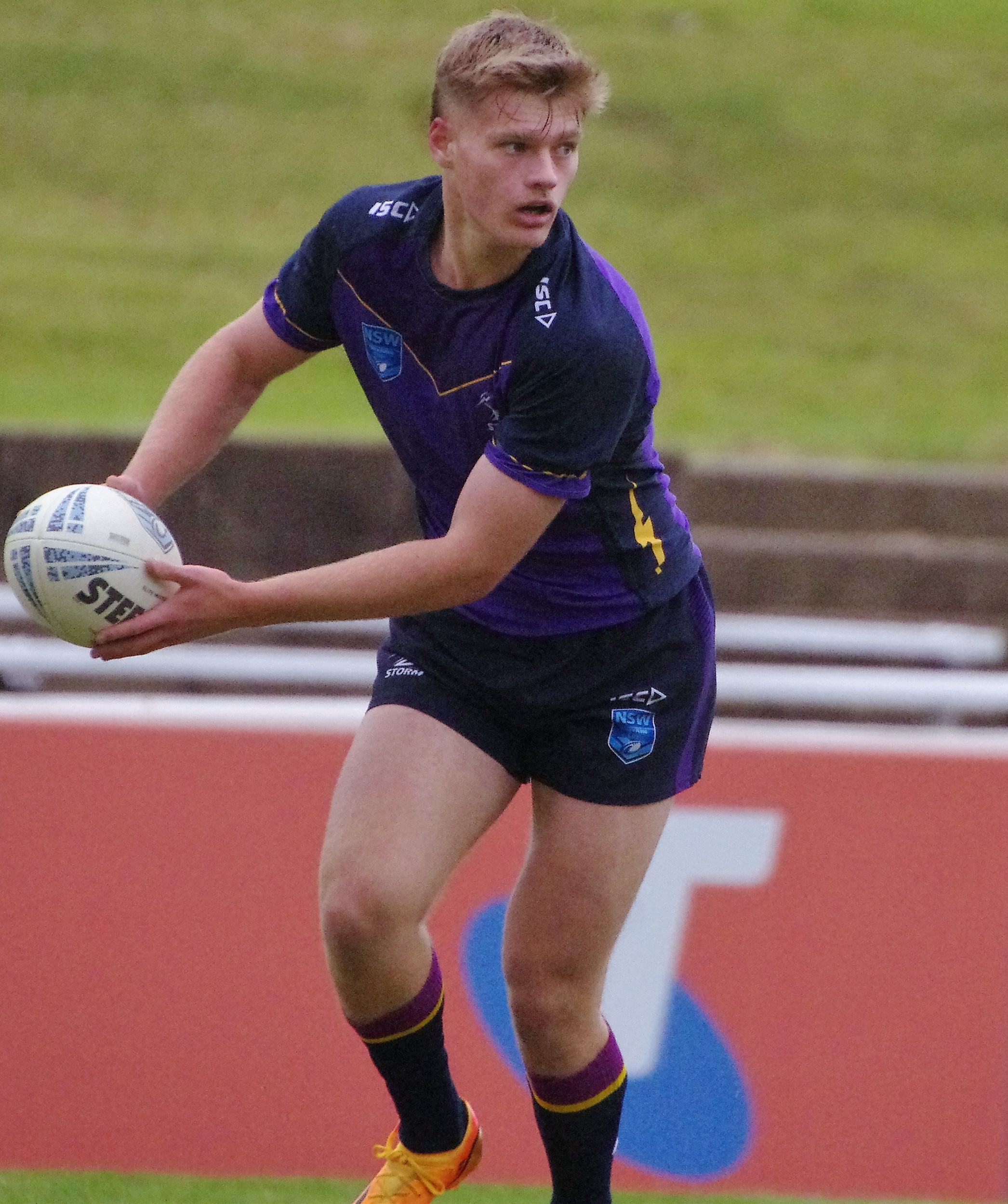

Personal information
- Full name: Keagan Russell-Smith
- Born: 8 July 2003 (age 23) Penrith, New South Wales
- Height: 178 cm (5 ft 10 in)
- Weight: 80 kg (12 st 8 lb)

Playing information
- Position: Halfback
Club
Years	Team	Pld	T	G	FG	P
2024–26	Melbourne Storm	2	0	0	0	0
- Source: As of 7 September 2026

Keagan Russell-Smith (born 8 July 2003) is an Australian professional rugby league footballer who plays as a halfback for the Melbourne Storm in the National Rugby League.

In round 26 2024, Russell-Smith made his NRL debut for Melbourne against the North Queensland Cowboys at Queensland Country Bank Stadium.

== Background ==
Russell-Smith was educated at St Dominic's College, Penrith, which has a strong rugby league program. His junior rugby league club was Penrith Brothers.

He played junior representative rugby league with the Penrith Panthers, playing 18 matches in the club's S.G. Ball Cup squad from 2021 to 2022, progressing through to the Jersey Flegg Cup squad in 2022. He was a member of the Panthers 2022 S.G. Ball Cup premiership team, kicking a late conversion from the left sideline to seal the win.

Signed by the Melbourne Storm as an academy prospect, he played a further 23 matches for the Storm in the under-21 Jersey Flegg Cup competition across 2023–2024. With 132 points, he was the Jersey Flegg Cup leading point-scorer for the 2023 season, winning the Melbourne Storm's Academy Player of the Year Award.

Russell-Smith made his second-tier NSW Cup debut for the North Sydney Bears in round 1 of the 2024 season, later transferring to the Queensland Cup competition to play with the Brisbane Tigers. Both clubs are affiliated with the Melbourne Storm in those competitions.

He has been described as a "special kid" by Melbourne Storm fullback Ryan Papenhuyzen, with the 2020 Clive Churchill medalist saying "he's one of those kids who's always asking questions, very coachable, wants to learn, and I generally think that's the tools you need to be a successful footy player."

== Playing career ==
Russell-Smith made his NRL debut for the Melbourne Storm in round 26 of the 2024 season, coming off the interchange bench in the Storm's 38–30 loss against the North Queensland Cowboys.
