= Shawn Blore =

Samoa international rugby league footballer

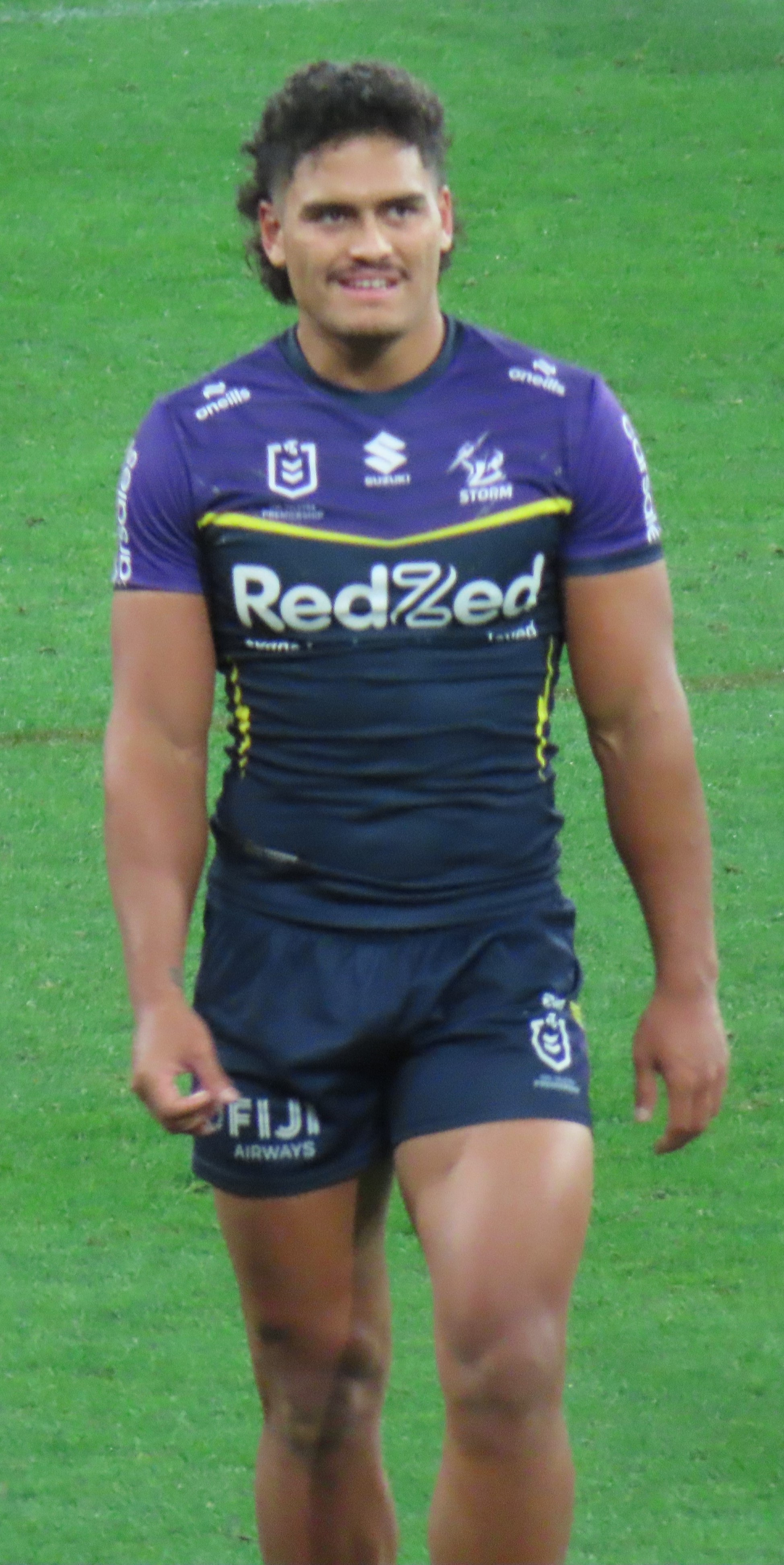

Personal information
- Born: 1 August 2000 (age 26) Sydney, New South Wales, Australia
- Height: 188 cm (6 ft 2 in)
- Weight: 107 kg (16 st 12 lb)

Playing information
- Position: Second-row
Club
Years	Team	Pld	T	G	FG	P
2020–23	Wests Tigers	33	1	0	0	4
2024–26	Melbourne Storm	61	4	0	0	16
2027–	Brisbane Broncos	0	0	0	0	0
	Total	94	5	0	0	20
Representative
Years	Team	Pld	T	G	FG	P
2024–	Samoa	4	4	0	0	16
- Source: As of 6 November 2026
- Relatives: Dean Blore (brother)

Shawn Blore (born 1 August 2000) is a Samoa international rugby league footballer who plays as a second-row forward for the Brisbane Broncos in the National Rugby League (NRL).

He has previously played for the Wests Tigers and Melbourne Storm

== Background ==
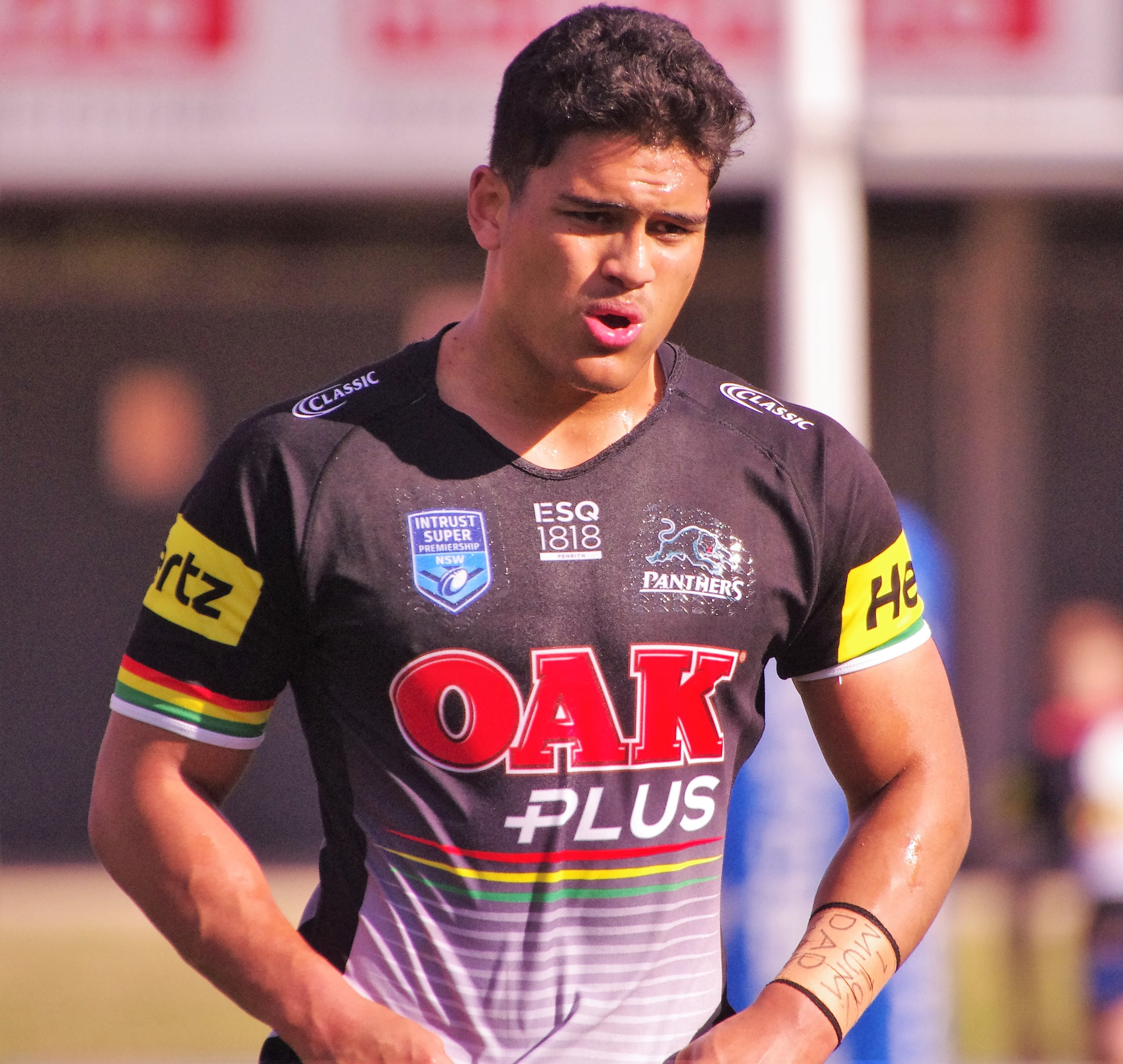
Blore playing for Penrith Panthers in 2018

Blore played his junior rugby league for Brothers Penrith in the Penrith District Junior Rugby League before progressing onto the Penrith Panthers juniors. In 2020 he signed with the Wests Tigers on a two-year deal.

== Career ==
=== 2020 ===
Blore made his first grade debut in round 11 of the 2020 NRL season for Wests Tigers against the Parramatta Eels at Bankwest Stadium where Wests lost the match 26–16. He was said to have "stood his ground in a fiery head-to-head and came away with a points decision" against Parramatta's Nathan Brown. After the match, coach Michael Maguire said, "I don't think he's played a full game of footy for about 14 months now, to see him play the way he did it was welcome to first grade that's for sure. He played a lot of time too, I didn't expect him to play that much time but he hung strong and showed he can play at this level." He made 5 appearances from the bench during the season, all losses.

=== 2021 ===
Blore played a total of twelve games for the Wests Tigers in the 2021 NRL season as the club finished 13th and missed the finals.

=== 2022 ===
On 4 February, it was announced that Blore would miss the entire 2022 NRL season after suffering an ACL injury during training at Concord Oval.

=== 2023 ===
Blore played a total of 15 games for the Wests Tigers in the 2023 NRL season as the club finished with the wooden spoon for a second straight year.

=== 2024 ===
On 12 January, Blore signed a three-year deal with Melbourne Storm as part of a swap deal with Justin Olam.

In round 3 of the 2024 NRL season, Blore made his Melbourne Storm debut against the Newcastle Knights. He was presented with his debut jersey (cap 234). Blore played a total of 24 matches for Melbourne in the 2024 NRL season as the club were runaway minor premiers. Blore played in Melbourne's 2024 NRL Grand Final loss against Penrith.

=== 2025 ===
Blore played 24 games for Melbourne in the 2025 NRL season including their 26-22 2025 NRL Grand Final loss against Brisbane.

=== 2026 ===
On 12 August 2026, Melbourne confirmed that Blore would depart at the end of the season and join the Brisbane Broncos. Blore played 13 games for Melbourne in the 2026 NRL season as the club finished 10th on the table, missing the finals for the first time since 2010.

== Statistics ==
Updated as of 29 June 2026

Year	Team	Games	Tries	Pts
2020	Wests Tigers	5	0	
2021	Wests Tigers	13	0	
2023	Wests Tigers	15	1	4
2024	Melbourne Storm	24	2	8
2025	Melbourne Storm	24	2	8
2026	Melbourne Storm	13	0	0
2027	Brisbane Broncos			
Career total		94	5	20
