= Jack Howarth (rugby league) =

Australian rugby league footballer

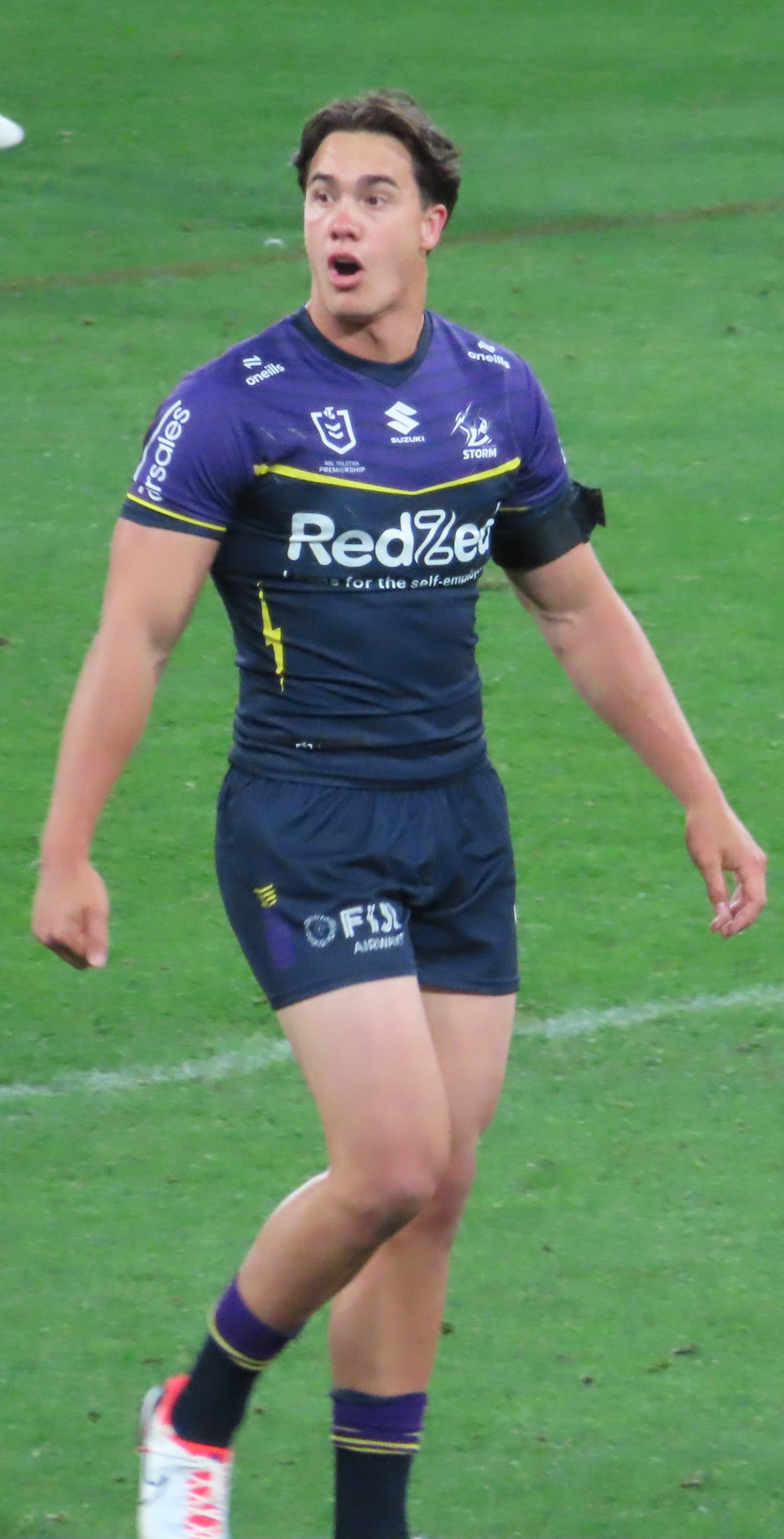

Personal information
- Born: 22 October 2002 (age 24) Mackay, Queensland, Australia
- Height: 193 cm (6 ft 4 in)
- Weight: 105 kg (16 st 7 lb)

Playing information
- Position: Centre
Club
Years	Team	Pld	T	G	FG	P
2023–	Melbourne Storm	50	12	0	0	48
Representative
Years	Team	Pld	T	G	FG	P
2024	Māori All Stars	1	0	0	0	0
- Source: As of 20 August 2026

Jack Howarth (born 22 October 2002) is a New Zealand Māori representative rugby league footballer who plays as a centre for the Melbourne Storm in the National Rugby League (NRL).

== Background ==
Howarth played his junior rugby league for Easts Tigers and attended Brisbane Boys' College, Brisbane before being signed by the Melbourne Storm.

He was chosen to represent the Australian Schoolboys rugby league team in 2019, scoring a try and earning the player of the match award in a win against New Zealand.

In 2020 he was a part of the Brisbane Boys College rugby team that won the school's first GPS Rugby title since 1954.

In June 2022, Howarth was selected for the Queensland U19s junior State of Origin team for their match against NSW. Howarth suffered a head injury in the second half and was unable to return to the field.

== Playing career ==
After two seasons playing with the Sunshine Coast Falcons in the Queensland Cup where he often struggled with injuries that hampered his development, Howarth made his NRL debut in round 27 of the 2023 NRL season for the Melbourne Storm against the Brisbane Broncos at Suncorp Stadium. Howarth had been signed to the Storm on a reported five-year contract from 2022.

=== 2024 ===
Howarth had an extended run in the Melbourne Storm squad during the 2024 season, earning a starting role in the centre position and scoring his first NRL try. On 24 August 2024, Howarth scored against Dolphins for his third try with the Melbourne club. Howarth played a total of 16 matches for Melbourne in the 2024 NRL season as the club were runaway minor premiers. Howarth played in Melbourne's 2024 NRL Grand Final loss against Penrith. In the second half of the match, Howarth was controversially denied a try after certain replays showed that the ball was not grounded over the try line however the decision to deny the try was upheld.

=== 2025 ===
Howarth was selected as a reserve player for the Queensland rugby league team for Game II of the 2025 State of Origin series, after he was ruled out of selection for Game I with a dislocated shoulder injury. He was a possible selection for Game III of the series, instead finding himself in hospital with appendicitis. Howarth played 16 games for Melbourne in the 2025 NRL season including their 26–22 2025 NRL Grand Final loss against Brisbane.

=== 2026 ===
Howarth featured in 17 games for Melbourne in the 2026 NRL season as the club finished 10th on the table, missing the finals for the first time since 2010.

== Statistics ==
Year	Team	Games	Tries	Pts
2023	Melbourne Storm	1	0	0
2024	Melbourne Storm	16	4	16
2025	Melbourne Storm	16	2	8
2026	Melbourne Storm	17	5	20
	Totals	49	11	44

== Honours ==
Club

- NRL minor premiership: 2024

Individual

- Melbourne Storm Billy Slater Rookie of the Year: 2024
