= Ativalu Lisati =

New Zealand rugby league footballer (born 2001)

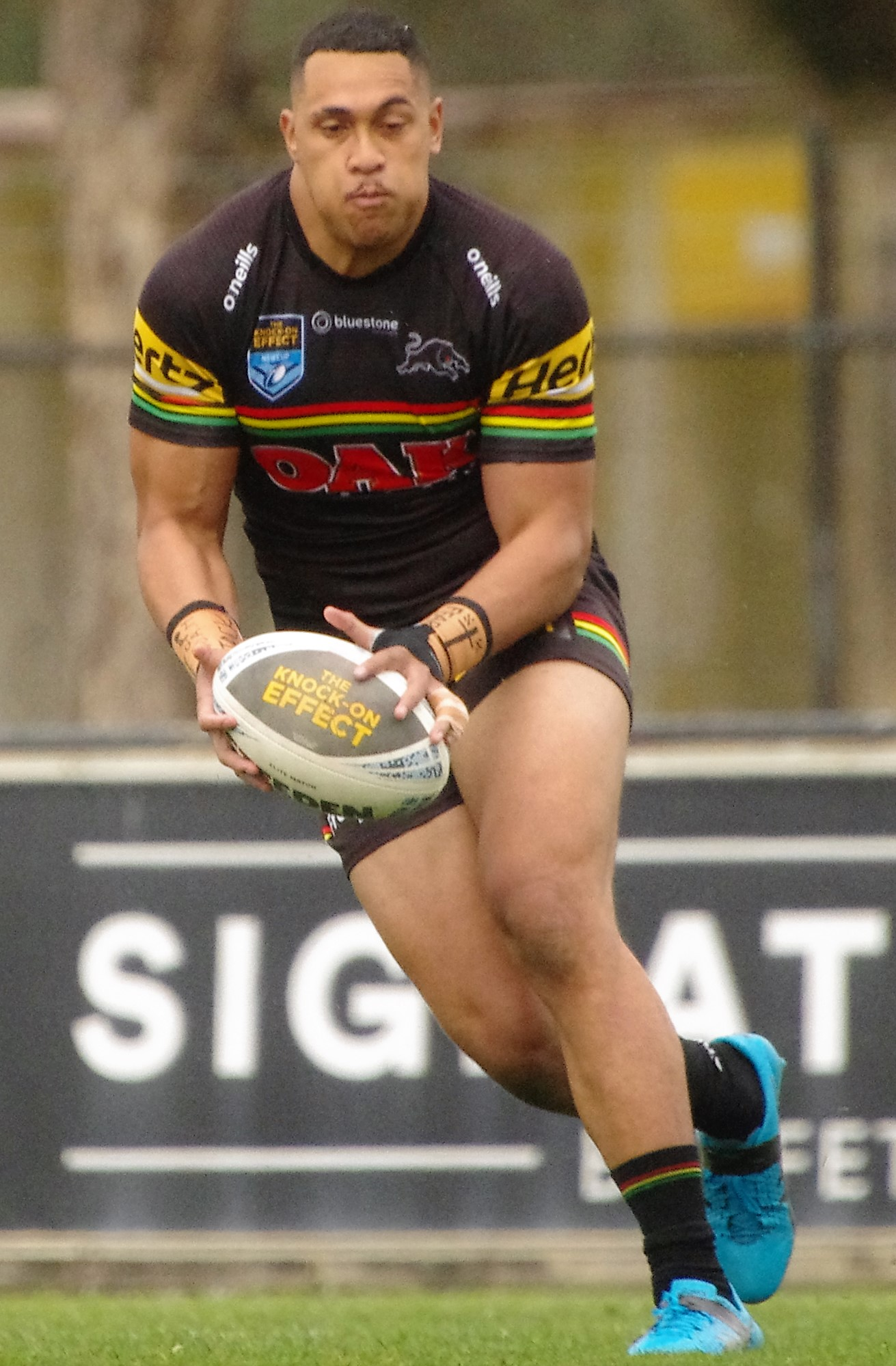

Personal information
- Full name: Ativalu Lisati
- Born: 31 January 2001 (age 25) New Zealand
- Height: 183 cm (6 ft 0 in)
- Weight: 99 kg (15 st 8 lb)

Playing information
- Position: Second-row, Lock
Club
Years	Team	Pld	T	G	FG	P
2024–	Melbourne Storm	25	5	0	0	20
Representative
Years	Team	Pld	T	G	FG	P
2025	Samoa	0	0	0	0	0
- Source: As of 27 June 2026

Ativalu Lisati (born 31 January 2001) is a New Zealand professional rugby league footballer who plays as a forward for the Melbourne Storm in the National Rugby League (NRL).

In August 2024, Lisati made his NRL debut for Melbourne against the North Queensland Cowboys at Queensland Country Bank Stadium.

== Background ==
Lisati moved from New Zealand in 2019 to pursue a rugby league career in Australia leaving his junior rugby league club the Glenora Bears. He had one season playing schoolboys rugby league with Ipswich State High School in 2019.

Joining the Penrith Panthers he played in the Jersey Flegg Cup competition and was a member of the Panthers 2022 Jersey Flegg Cup premiership team.

He progressed through the grades at Penrith, playing at the NSW Cup level from 2022 through 2024 at the Panthers where he earned a development contract from the 2023 season. He was signed by the Melbourne Storm midway through the 2024 NRL season, transferring to the Storm-affiliated North Sydney Bears.

== Playing career ==
Lisati made his NRL debut for the Melbourne Storm in round 26 of the 2024 season, coming from the interchange bench to score a try in the club's 38–30 loss against the North Queensland Cowboys.

Lisati played 14 games for Melbourne in the 2025 NRL season including their 26–22 2025 NRL Grand Final loss against Brisbane. It was announced that he had extended his contract with the club until the end of the 2027 season in December 2025.

During the 2025 Rugby League Pacific Championships he was called into the Samoa squad, but did not make his international debut during the tournament.
