= Tyran Wishart =

Australian rugby league footballer

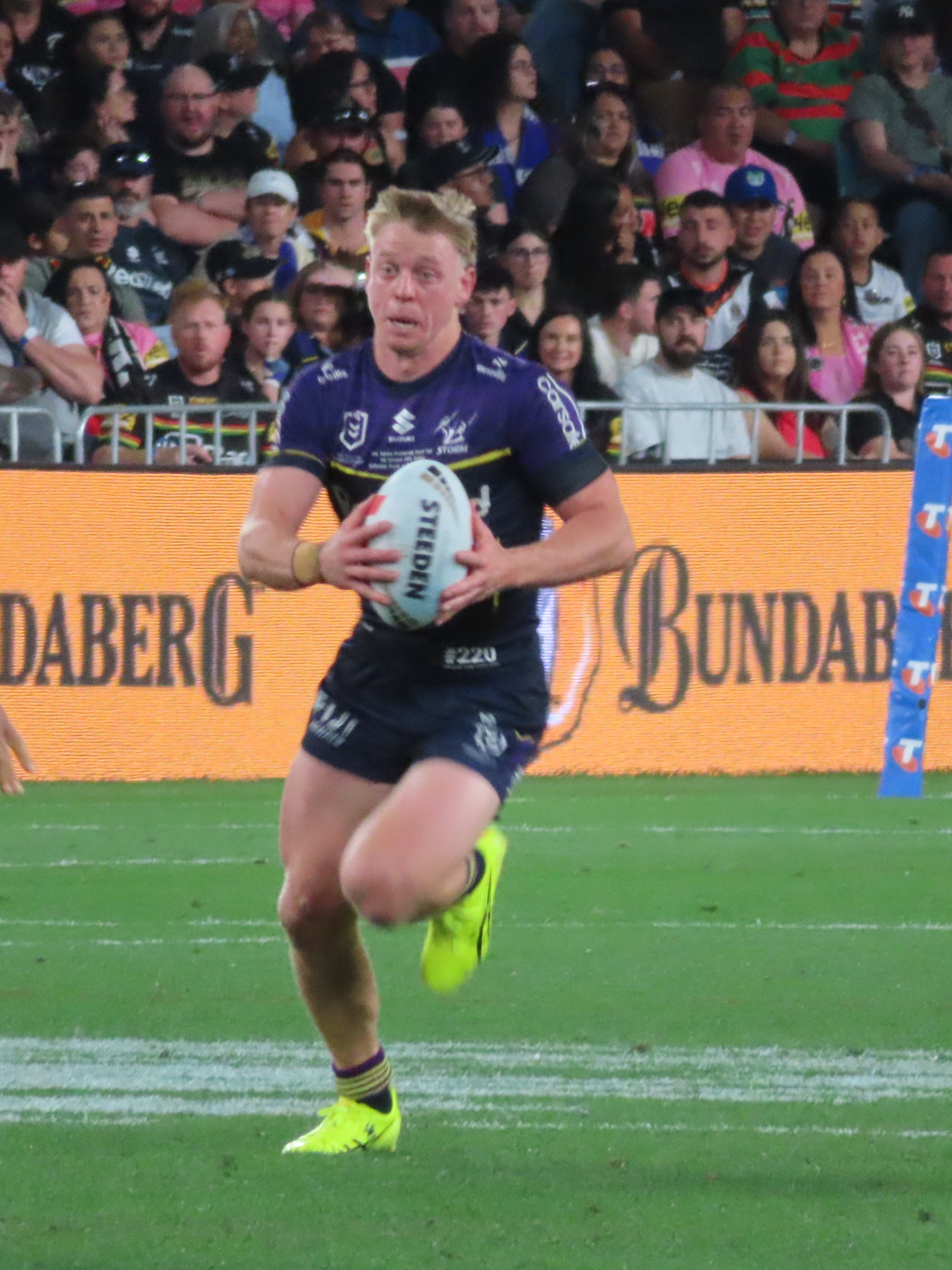

Personal information
- Born: 17 November 1999 (age 26) Gerringong, New South Wales, Australia
- Height: 182 cm (6 ft 0 in)
- Weight: 89 kg (14 st 0 lb)

Playing information
- Position: Five-eighth, Halfback, Hooker
Club
Years	Team	Pld	T	G	FG	P
2022–26	Melbourne Storm	100	27	20	0	148
2027–	Perth Bears	0	0	0	0	0
	Total	100	27	20	0	148
Representative
Years	Team	Pld	T	G	FG	P
2024–25	Prime Minister's XIII	2	1	0	0	4
- Source: As of 6 November 2026
- Father: Rod Wishart

Tyran Wishart (born 17 November 1999) is an Australian rugby league footballer who plays as a five-eighth or halfback in the National Rugby League (NRL) for the Perth Bears.

== Background ==
Wishart is the son of former Illawarra Steelers and St. George Illawarra Dragons winger Rod Wishart.

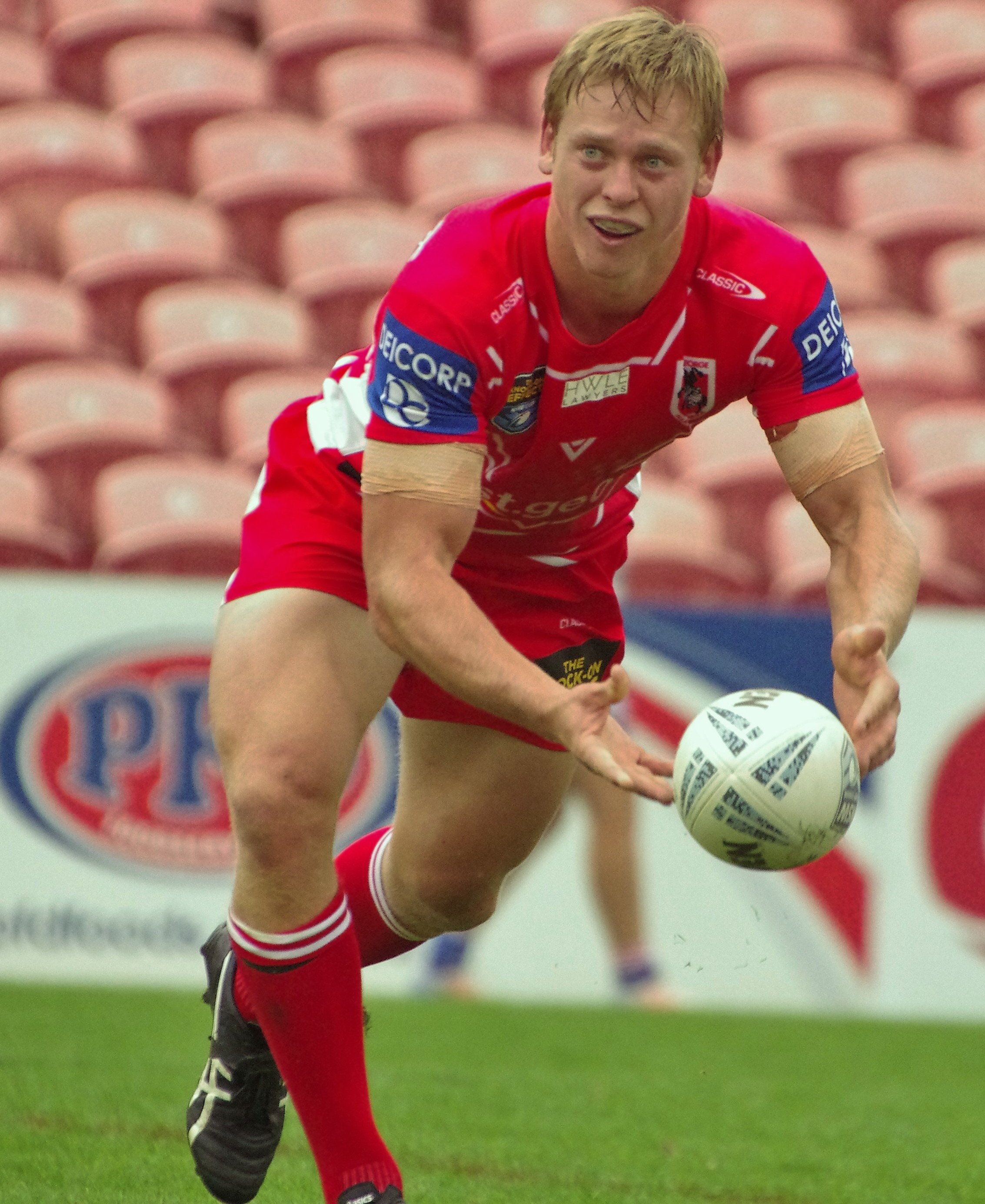
Wishart playing with the St George Illawarra Dragons.

He played his junior rugby league for the Gerringong Lions. Wishart was educated at Kiama High School before playing junior representative for the St George Illawarra Dragons. He then signed his first senior contract with Melbourne Storm.

== Playing career ==
Wishart made his debut in round 1 of the 2022 NRL season for Melbourne Storm against Wests Tigers. He had his jersey (cap 220) presented to him by his father and former Illawarra Steelers player Rod Wishart.

Wishart would make 15 appearances for Melbourne during 2022, mostly being used as a utility off the interchange bench. His season was cut short by a syndesmosis injury in round 23. Wishart played 14 games for Melbourne in the 2023 NRL season as the club finished third on the table. Wishart played in Melbourne's semi-final victory over the Sydney Roosters where he scored a try.

In April 2024, Wishart would make an appearance for the North Sydney Bears in the New South Wales Cup competition after sitting on the bench for the entire match for Melbourne in their round 7 2024 game against the Sydney Roosters. Wishart played a total of 26 matches for Melbourne in the 2024 NRL season. Wishart played in Melbourne's 2024 NRL Grand Final loss against Penrith.

Following the Grand Final it was announced Wishart would make his debut for representative debut playing for the Prime Minister's XIII against the PNG Prime Minster's XIII on 13 October 2024, scoring a try in the first half. Wishart played the game alongside his future brother-in-law, Manly Warringah Sea Eagles outside back Reuben Garrick who got engaged to Wishart's sister Riley in 2024. Wishart played 27 games for Melbourne in the 2025 NRL season including their 26-22 2025 NRL Grand Final loss against Brisbane.

=== 2025 ===
On 12 October 2025 he played for the Prime Minister's XIII in the 28-10 win over PNG Prime Minister's XIII in Port Moresby

=== 2026 ===
On 9 January, Melbourne confirmed that Wishart and Nick Meaney would depart the club at the end of the season and join the Perth Bears. A day later the Perth outfit confirmed that Wishart had signed a five-year deal with the new team.

== Honours ==
Individual

- Melbourne Storm Billy Slater Rookie of the Year: 2022
- RLPA Academic Team of the Year: 2023

Club

- 2024 J. J. Giltinan Shield winners
- 2024 NRL Grand Final runners-up

== Statistics ==
Year	Team	Games	Tries	Goals	Pts
2022	Melbourne Storm	15			
2023	Melbourne Storm	14	2		8
2024	Melbourne Storm	26	12	14	76
2025	Melbourne Storm	27	7	3	34
2026	Melbourne Storm	18	6	3	30
2027	Perth Bears				
	Totals	100	27	20	148
