= Tristan Powell =

Australian professional rugby league footballer

Personal information
- Full name: Tristan Powell
- Born: 9 February 2001 (age 25) Hervey Bay, Queensland, Australia
- Height: 6 ft 0 in (1.83 m)
- Weight: 16 st 1 lb (102 kg)

Playing information
- Position: Prop
Club
Years	Team	Pld	T	G	FG	P
2024	Melbourne Storm	1	0	0	0	0
2025–	Huddersfield Giants	43	3	0	0	12
	Total	44	3	0	0	12
- Source: As of 7 January 2026

Tristan Powell (born 9 February 2001) is an Australian professional rugby league footballer who plays as a prop for the Huddersfield Giants in the Betfred Super League.

He has previously played for the Melbourne Storm in the National Rugby League. Powell was contracted to the Gold Coast Titans and the Brisbane Broncos in the NRL. He also played for the Brisbane Tigers, as well as the Burleigh Bears in two separate spells in the Queensland Cup.

== Background ==
Powell was born in Hervey Bay, Queensland, Australia.

He played for the Goondiwindi Boars as a junior. He played SEQ White at under 16 level in the 2017 QRL State Championship. At under 18 level he played for the Norths Devils in the 2018 Mal Meninga Cup. The following season he moved to the Burleigh Bears, playing in the 2019 Mal Meninga Cup. He played for the Burleigh Colts side between 2019 and 2021.

Powell represented Queensland at both under-16 and under-18 level.

== Career ==
Powell was a development player for the Gold Coast Titans in the NRL, joining the club on trial in 2019 and leaving the club at the end of the 2021 NRL season.

He made his debut in April 2021 for the Burleigh Bears against the Tweed Heads Seagulls in the Queensland Cup. He played 19 reserve grade games for the Bears between 2021 and 2022.

Powell was contracted on the development list by the Melbourne Storm in the NRL in 2023, and played for the Brisbane Tigers, the feeder side of the Storm in the 2023 and 2024 QLD Cup seasons.

He earned the Tigers forward of the year honour in 2023. He won the 2023 Queensland Cup with victory of his former side Burleigh.

In August 2024 Powell made his Melbourne first-grade debut in the National Rugby League against the North Queensland Cowboys.

Ahead of the 2025 NRL season he returned to the Burleigh Bears, as a contracted player with the Brisbane Broncos.

Powell joined the Huddersfield Giants in the Super League on a two-and-a-half year deal in May 2025.
