= List of Melbourne Storm records =

This article contains records and statistics for the Melbourne Storm Rugby League Club who have played in the Australian National Rugby League competition since 1998. Statistical information on this page is for NRL games only and does not take into account games against non-NRL teams, e.g. World Club Challenge games.

This article is current as at the end of the 2026 NRL season.

General sources of information:

- Rugby League Project
- Rugby League Tables
- Melbourne Storm Honour Roll

== Melbourne Storm win–loss record ==
=== Overall ===
Played	Wins	Draws	Losses	Points for	Average points for	Against points	Average points against	Win%
760	503	6	251	18,755	24.68	12,919	17.00	66.58%

=== Melbourne Storm win–loss records ===
Opponent	Played	Won	Drawn	Lost	Win %
Western Suburbs Magpies	4	4	0	0	100
Adelaide Rams	1	1	0	0	100
Gold Coast Chargers	1	1	0	0	100
**South Sydney Rabbitohs**	45	36	0	9	**80.00**
**Gold Coast Titans**	30	23	0	7	**76.67**
Illawarra Steelers	2	1	1	0	75.00
**Brisbane Broncos**	62	44	1	17	**71.77**
**North Queensland Cowboys**	48	34	0	14	**70.83**
**Wests Tigers**	40	28	0	12	**70.00**
**St George Illawarra Dragons**	44	30	1	13	**69.32**
**Canberra Raiders**	57	39	0	18	**68.42**
**New Zealand Warriors**	54	35	2	17	**66.67**
**Newcastle Knights**	50	33	0	17	**66.00**
**Cronulla-Sutherland Sharks**	51	33	0	18	**64.71**
**Penrith Panthers**	51	33	0	18	**64.71**
**Parramatta Eels**	50	32	0	18	**64.00**
**Sydney Roosters**	55	34	0	20	**61.82**
**Dolphins**	5	3	0	2	**60.00**
Northern Eagles	5	3	0	2	60.00
**Manly Warringah Sea Eagles**	49	28	1	20	**58.16**
**Canterbury-Bankstown Bulldogs**	50	26	0	24	**52.00**
Balmain Tigers	2	1	0	1	50.00
North Sydney Bears	3	1	0	2	33.33
St. George Dragons	1	0	0	1	00.00

Note: Active opponents are noted in bold.

== Club honours ==
=== NRL premierships ===
Year	Opponent	Score
1999 NRL Grand Final	St. George Illawarra Dragons	20–18
2012 NRL Grand Final	Canterbury-Bankstown Bulldogs	14–4
2017 NRL Grand Final	North Queensland Cowboys	34–6
2020 NRL Grand Final	Penrith Panthers	26–20

Note: 2007 and 2009 titles stripped due to salary cap breach.

=== NRL runners up ===
Year	Opponent	Score
2006 NRL Grand Final	Brisbane Broncos	8–15
2008 NRL Grand Final	Manly Warringah Sea Eagles	0–40
2016 NRL Grand Final	Cronulla-Sutherland Sharks	12–14
2018 NRL Grand Final	Sydney Roosters	6–21
2024 NRL Grand Final	Penrith Panthers	6–14
2025 NRL Grand Final	Brisbane Broncos	22–26

=== NRL minor premierships ===
Year	Wins
2011 NRL season	19
2016 NRL season	19
2017 NRL season	20
2019 NRL season	20
2021 NRL season	21
2024 NRL season	19

Note: 2006, 2007 and 2008 titles stripped due to salary cap breach.

=== NRL Under-20s premierships ===
Year	Opponent	Score
2009	Wests Tigers	24–22

Note: The NRL Under-20s (National Youth Competition) ceased operation following the 2017 season.

=== World Club Challenge titles ===
Year	Opponent	Score
2000	St. Helens	44–6
2013	Leeds Rhinos	18–14
2018	Leeds Rhinos	38–4

Note: 2010 title stripped due to salary cap breach.

=== Finals appearances ===
25 of 29 seasons

1998, 1999, 2000, 2003, 2004, 2005, 2006, 2007, 2008, 2009, 2011, 2012, 2013, 2014, 2015, 2016, 2017, 2018, 2019, 2020, 2021, 2022, 2023, 2024, 2025

== Club records ==
=== Winning games ===
==== Top 10 biggest wins ====
Rank	Margin	Mel	Opp	Opponent	Venue	Date
1	64	64	0	Wests Tigers	Docklands Stadium	5 July 2001
1	64	68	4	Canberra Raiders	Canberra Stadium	4 August 2013
1	64	64	0	Wests Tigers	Melbourne Rectangular Stadium	11 May 2025
4	60	70	10	St. George Illawarra Dragons	Melbourne Cricket Ground	3 March 2000
4	60	64	4	Parramatta Eels	Melbourne Rectangular Stadium	25 August 2013
4	60	70	10	New Zealand Warriors	Melbourne Rectangular Stadium	25 April 2022
7	58	64	6	South Sydney Rabbitohs	Melbourne Rectangular Stadium	26 August 2017
8	56	62	6	Gold Coast Chargers	Olympic Park	31 May 1998
8	56	62	6	Western Suburbs	Lathlain Oval	8 May 1999
10	54	64	10	Parramatta Eels	Lang Park	11 May 2019

==== Top 10 highest scores ====
Rank	Mel.	Opp.	Opponent	Venue	Date
1	70	10	St. George Illawarra Dragons	Melbourne Cricket Ground	3 March 2000
1	70	10	New Zealand Warriors	Melbourne Rectangular Stadium	25 April 2022
3	68	4	Canberra Raiders	Canberra Stadium	4 August 2013
4	66	14	Penrith Panthers	Olympic Park	2 July 2004
4	66	16	Wests Tigers	Sunshine Coast Stadium	19 June 2021
6	64	0	Wests Tigers	Docklands Stadium	5 July 2001
6	64	0	Wests Tigers	Melbourne Rectangular Stadium	11 May 2025
6	64	4	Parramatta Eels	Melbourne Rectangular Stadium	25 August 2013
6	64	6	South Sydney Rabbitohs	Melbourne Rectangular Stadium	26 August 2017
6	64	10	Parramatta Eels	Lang Park	11 May 2019

==== Most consecutive wins ====
- 19 matches: Round 4 (2 April 2021) — Round 23 (19 August 2021)

==== Biggest comeback ====
Recovered from a 22-point deficit.

- Trailed Cronulla-Sutherland Sharks 22–0 after 32 minutes to win 36–32 at Shark Park (16 March 2003). (Note: This game is also notable as it was Billy Slater's debut NRL game.)

=== Losing games ===
==== Top 10 biggest losses ====
Rank	Margin	Mel	Opp	Opponent	Venue	Date
1	46	4	50	St. George Illawarra Dragons	Wollongong Showground	4 June 2000
1	46	4	50	Bulldogs	Sydney Showground	10 August 2003
3	44	10	54	Parramatta Eels	Docklands Stadium	20 July 2001
4	42	6	48	South Sydney Rabbitohs	Melbourne Rectangular Stadium	25 April 2026
5	40	0	40	Manly Warringah Sea Eagles	Stadium Australia	5 October 2008
5	40	10	50	Penrith Panthers	Western Sydney Stadium	3 April 2026
7	39	0	39	Canterbury-Bankstown Bulldogs	Stadium Australia	14 July 2013
8	35	6	41	Sydney Roosters	Sydney Football Stadium	11 June 2000
9	34	4	38	Penrith Panthers	Stadium Australia	22 September 2023
10	32	6	38	Newcastle Knights	Newcastle International Sports Centre	12 February 2000
10	32	16	48	Newcastle Knights	Newcastle International Sports Centre	15 July 2001
10	32	8	40	North Queensland Cowboys	Willows Sports Complex	25 March 2006
10	32	6	38	Sydney Roosters	Melbourne Rectangular Stadium	14 June 2010

==== Top 10 highest scores conceded ====
Rank	Opp.	Mel.	Opponent	Venue	Date
1	54	10	Parramatta Eels	Docklands Stadium	20 July 2001
2	50	4	St. George Illawarra Dragons	Wollongong Showground	4 June 2000
2	50	28	Sydney Roosters	Sydney Football Stadium	12 August 2001
2	50	4	Bulldogs	Sydney Showground	10 August 2003
2	50	10	Penrith Panthers	Western Sydney Stadium	3 April 2026
6	48	16	Newcastle Knights	Newcastle International Sports Centre	15 July 2001
6	48	20	Brisbane Broncos	Olympic Park	3 August 2002
6	48	6	South Sydney Rabbitohs	Melbourne Rectangular Stadium	25 April 2026
10	45	20	North Queensland Cowboys	North Queensland Stadium	4 June 2023

==== Most consecutive losses ====
- 7 matches: Round 3 (20 March 2026) — Round 9 (1 May 2026)

==== Worst collapse ====
Surrendered an 18-point lead.

- Led Canberra Raiders 18–0 after 29 minutes to lose 22–18 at Melbourne Rectangular Stadium (17 August 2019).

== Individual records ==
=== Games for club ===
- NRL games only
- Players who have played 150+ games for the club

Games	Player	Time span
430	Cameron Smith	2002–2020
323	Cooper Cronk	2004–2017
319	Billy Slater	2003–2018
295	Jesse Bromwich	2010–2022
265	Ryan Hoffman	2003–2010, 2012–2014 & 2018
262	Matt Geyer	1998–2008
255	Cameron Munster	2014–present
216	Kenneath Bromwich	2013–2022
215	Will Chambers	2007–2009 & 2012–2019
215	Nelson Asofa-Solomona	2015–2025
186	Jahrome Hughes	2017–present
179	Kevin Proctor	2008–2016
177	Scott Hill	1998–2006
175	Ryan Hinchcliffe	2009–2015
173	Felise Kaufusi	2015–2022
169	Robbie Kearns	1998–2005
163	Christian Welch	2015–2024
157	Dallas Johnson	2003–2009
152	Dale Finucane	2015–2021

Note: as at the end of the 2026 NRL season

=== Try scoring records ===
==== Top 10 most tries for club ====
Tries	Player	Time span
190	Billy Slater	2003–2018
113	Matt Geyer	1998–2008
96	Josh Addo-Carr	2017–2021
92	Cooper Cronk	2004–2017
86	Suliasi Vunivalu	2016–2020
84	Will Chambers	2007–2009 & 2012–2019
78	Greg Inglis	2005–2010
77	Ryan Papenhuyzen	2019–2025
72	Jahrome Hughes	2017–present
70	Marcus Bai	1998–2003

Note: As at the end of the 2026 NRL season.

==== Most tries in a match ====
Tries	Player	Opponent	Venue	Date
6	Josh Addo-Carr	South Sydney Rabbitohs	Stadium Australia	6 May 2021
4	Matt Geyer	Western Suburbs Magpies	Lathlain Park	8 May 1999
4	Matt Geyer	Auckland Warriors	Olympic Park	18 June 2000
4	Aaron Moule	Northern Eagles	Docklands Stadium	13 April 2001
4	Jake Webster	Wests Tigers	Olympic Park	5 August 2006
4	Billy Slater	Manly Warringah Sea Eagles	Docklands Stadium	11 September 2009
4	Sisa Waqa	Newcastle Knights	Newcastle International Sports Centre	9 August 2014
4	Suliasi Vunivalu	Manly Warringah Sea Eagles	Brookvale Oval	20 August 2016
4	Ryan Papenhuyzen	Brisbane Broncos	Melbourne Rectangular Stadium	2 April 2021
4	Ryan Papenhuyzen	Canterbury-Bankstown Bulldogs	Melbourne Rectangular Stadium	3 April 2022
4	Ryan Papenhuyzen	Wests Tigers	Melbourne Rectangular Stadium	11 May 2025
4	Xavier Coates	New Zealand Warriors	Melbourne Rectangular Stadium	25 April 2022
4	Will Warbrick	Wests Tigers	Campbelltown Sports Stadium	17 June 2023
4	Will Warbrick	North Queensland Cowboys	North Queensland Stadium	28 March 2026

==== Most tries in a season ====
Current record is in bold.

Season	Player	Tries
1998	Scott Hill	14
1998	Marcus Bai	14
1999	Matt Geyer	20
1999	Robbie Ross	20
2000	Matt Geyer	14
2001	Matt Orford	15
2001	Aaron Moule	15
2002	Aaron Moule	17
2003	Billy Slater	19
2004	Steven Bell	18
2005	Billy Slater	20
2006	Greg Inglis	18
2006	Steve Turner	18
2007	Israel Folau	21
2008	Greg Inglis	17
2009	Billy Slater	19
2010	Greg Inglis	11
2011	Cooper Cronk	12
2011	Matt Duffie	12
2011	Billy Slater	12
2012	Billy Slater	16
2013	Billy Slater	18
2014	Sisa Waqa	18
2015	Marika Koroibete	15
2016	Suliasi Vunivalu	**23**
2017	Suliasi Vunivalu	**23**
2017	Josh Addo-Carr	**23**
2018	Josh Addo-Carr	18
2019	Josh Addo-Carr	16
2020	Josh Addo-Carr	16
2021	Josh Addo-Carr	**23**
2022	Xavier Coates	16
2023	Will Warbrick	17
2024	Will Warbrick	15
2025	Xavier Coates	20
2026	Sualauvi Fa'alogo	18

=== Points scoring records ===
==== Top 10 most points for club ====
Points	Player	Tries	Goals	Field goals (Note: 1 point field goals/2 point field goals)	Time span
2786	Cameron Smith	48	1295	4/0	2002–2020 (Note: Cameron Smith's total is also the current league record.)
886	Nick Meaney	43	357	0/0	2022–2026
877	Matt Orford	52	333	3/0	2001–2005
760	Billy Slater	190	0	0/0	2003–2018
662	Matt Geyer	113	105	0/0	1998–2008
635	Ryan Papenhuyzen	77	156	5/1	2019–2025
390	Cooper Cronk	92	1	20/0	2004–2017
386	Josh Addo-Carr	96	1	0/0	2017–2021
358	Cameron Munster	65	47	4/0	2014–present
344	Suliasi Vunivalu	86	0	0/0	2016–2020

Note: As at the end of the 2026 NRL season.

==== Most points in a season ====
Current record is in bold.

Season	Player	Tries	Goals	Field goals (Note: 1 point field goal/2 point field goal)	Points
1998	Craig Smith	2	51	0/0	110
1999	Matt Geyer	20	81	0/0	**242**
2000	Tasesa Lavea	7	81	0/0	190
2001	Matt Orford	15	78	0/0	216
2002	Matt Orford	8	62	0/0	156
2003	Matt Orford	8	74	0/0	180
2004	Matt Orford	10	56	1/0	153
2005	Matt Orford	11	63	2/0	172
2006	Cameron Smith	5	79	0/0	178
2007	Cameron Smith	4	88	0/0	192
2008	Cameron Smith	4	77	0/0	170
2009	Cameron Smith	3	65	0/0	142
2010	Cameron Smith	2	54	0/0	116
2011	Cameron Smith	5	79	0/0	178
2012	Cameron Smith	5	79	0/0	178
2013	Cameron Smith	2	78	0/0	164
2014	Cameron Smith	2	68	1/0	145
2015	Cameron Smith	1	71	0/0	146
2016	Cameron Smith	2	92	2/0	194
2017	Cameron Smith	2	92	0/0	192
2018	Cameron Smith	1	98	1/0	201
2019	Cameron Smith	2	104	0/0	216
2020	Cameron Smith	3	86	0/0	184
2021	Ryan Papenhuyzen	14	49	1/1	157
2022	Nick Meaney	13	48	0/0	148
2023	Nick Meaney	10	91	0/0	222
2024	Nick Meaney	5	106	0/0	232
2025	Ryan Papenhuyzen	15	60	1/0	181
2026	Nick Meaney	5	66	0/0	152

==== Top 10 most points in a game ====
Rank	Points	Player	Tries	Goals	Field goals	Opponent	Venue	Date
1	36	Ryan Papenhuyzen	4	10	0	Wests Tigers	Melbourne Rectangular Stadium	11 May 2025
2	34	Matt Geyer	4	9	0	Western Suburbs Magpies	Lathlain Park	8 May 1999
3	28	Ryan Papenhuyzen	4	6	0	Canterbury-Bankstown Bulldogs	Melbourne Rectangular Stadium	3 April 2022
4	26	Ryan Papenhuyzen	4	5	0	Brisbane Broncos	Melbourne Rectangular Stadium	2 April 2021
5	24	Joseph Tomane	3	6	0	Brisbane Broncos	Olympic Park	5 June 2009
5	24	Tasesa Lavea	2	8	0	St George Illawarra Dragons	Melbourne Cricket Ground	3 March 2000
5	24	Matt Geyer	2	8	0	South Sydney Rabbitohs	Olympic Park	24 April 1999
5	24	Matt Orford	1	10	0	Wests Tigers	Docklands Stadium	5 July 2001
5	24	Josh Addo-Carr	6	0	0	South Sydney Rabbitohs	Stadium Australia	6 May 2021
5	24	Ryan Papenhuyzen	2	7	1 (Note: 2 point field goal)	Manly Warringah Sea Eagles	Sunshine Coast Stadium	10 September 2021

==== Most goals in a game ====
- 11, Matt Orford – July 2, 2004 vs Penrith Panthers at Olympic Park

== Age records ==
=== Oldest player fielded ===
- 37 years and 129 days, Cameron Smith – October 25, 2020 vs Penrith Panthers at Stadium Australia

=== Youngest player fielded ===
- 17 years and 347 days, Israel Folau – March 16, 2007 vs Wests Tigers at Olympic Park

== Relationship records ==
=== Father/son relationships ===
Storm cap no.	Father	Storm cap no.	Son
71	Alex Chan	233	Joe Chan

=== Notable Storm relationships ===
Anderson family

- Ben Anderson Melbourne Storm player (1998–1999)
- Chris Anderson Melbourne Storm coach (1998–2001)

Bromwich brothers

- Jesse Bromwich Melbourne Storm player (2010–2022)
- Kenny Bromwich Melbourne Storm player (2013–2022)

Chan family

- Alex Chan Melbourne Storm player (2004–2005)
- Joe Chan Melbourne Storm player (2023–2026)

Cross brothers

- Ben Cross Melbourne Storm player (2006–2007)
- Matt Cross Melbourne Storm player (2009)

Johns family

- Matthew Johns Melbourne Storm specialist coach (2007–2009)
- Cooper Johns Melbourne Storm player (2020–2022)

Kaufusi brothers

- Antonio Kaufusi Melbourne Storm player (2003–2008)
- Felise Kaufusi Melbourne Storm player (2015–2022)
- Patrick Kaufusi Melbourne Storm player (2018–2019)

MacDougall brothers

- Ben MacDougall Melbourne Storm player (2004)
- Luke MacDougall Melbourne Storm player (2010)

Walters family

- Kevin Walters Melbourne Storm assistant coach (2011–2013)
- Billy Walters Melbourne Storm player (2019)

== Discipline ==
=== Players sent off ===
Year	Round	Player	Opponent	Referee(s)	Offence
2000	Round 24	Rodney Howe	Northern Eagles	Sean Hampstead	High tackle
2002	Round 14	Shane Walker	St George Illawarra Dragons	Sean Hampstead	High tackle
2004	Round 19	Danny Williams	Wests Tigers	Gavin Badger	Striking
2008	Round 2	Brett White	Cronulla Sharks	Tony Archer	Fighting
2009	Round 15	Dane Nielsen	Wests Tigers	Steve Lyons; Ashley Klein	High tackle
2011	Round 25	Adam Blair	Manly Sea Eagles	Shayne Hayne; Gavin Badger	Fighting
2018	Round 11	Curtis Scott	Manly Sea Eagles	Henry Perenara; Ziggy Przeklasa-Adamski	Striking/fighting

=== Most sin bins – career ===
- 7 — Billy Slater: 2006 R21, 2008 R19, 2008 R26, 2010 R13, 2012 R10, 2013 R6, 2014 R2
- 7 — Nelson Asofa-Solomona: 2019 PF, 2020 R15, 2021 R5, 2021 R15, 2024 R24, 2024 PF, 2025 R27
- 6 — Cameron Munster: 2017 R20, 2017 QF, 2018 R23, 2018 GF (twice), 2024 R7

=== Longest suspensions ===
Year	Round	Player	Offence & grade	Result
1998	N/A	Rodney Howe	Doping	22 matches
2004	Round 19	Danny Williams	Striking (ungraded)	18 matches
2006	Round 9	Michael Crocker	Dangerous throw (Grade 4)	9 matches (965 demerit points)
2000	Round 15	Stephen Kearney	Dangerous throw (Grade 3)	8 matches (884 demerit points)
2006	Round 4	Billy Slater	Kicking (Grade 5)	7 matches (788 demerit points)
2014	Round 3	Jordan McLean	Dangerous throw (Grade 2)	7 matches (700 demerit points)
2001	Round 1	Rodney Howe	Reckless high tackle (Grade 3)	6 matches (633 demerit points)
1999	Round 3	Stephen Kearney	Dangerous throw (Grade 1)	5 matches (515 demerit points)
2024	Preliminary final	Nelson Asofa-Solomona	High tackle – careless (Grade 3)	5 matches

== Honour Roll ==
=== Captains ===
This is the complete list of all players that have captained the Melbourne Storm Rugby League club in an NRL game since 1998. Order is dictated by the year and round in which each player first captained the team. Between 2006 and 2007 the club had a rotating captains policy, so there were a large number of players listed as captain during this time. Cameron Smith, the club's longest serving captain, captained his first game during this period (round 3 2006) even though he did not become the permanent captain until round 18 in 2007; this makes him the club's 11th captain. After his retirement, the club used co-captains during the 2021 and 2022 seasons before reverting to a single captain for 2023. The incumbent captain is Harry Grant.

#	Name	First game as captain	Last game as captain	Total games as captain
1	Glenn Lazarus	Rd 1, 1998	Grand Final, 1999	44
2	Tawera Nikau	Rd 13, 1998	Rd 17, 1999	11
3	Robbie Kearns	Rd 1, 2000	Qualifying final, 2005	82
4	Stephen Kearney	Rd 14, 2000	Semi final, 2004	55
5	Richard Swain	Rd 16, 2000	Rd 18, 2000	2
6	Robbie Ross	Rd 13, 2001	Rd 13, 2001	1
7	Rodney Howe	Rd 14, 2001	Rd 26, 2004	14
8	Matt Orford	Semi-final, 2005	Semi final, 2005	1
9	David Kidwell	Rd 1, 2006	Preliminary final, 2006	8
10	Scott Hill	Rd 2, 2006	Rd 24, 2006	5
11	Cameron Smith	Rd 3, 2006	Grand Final, 2020	328
12	Matt Geyer	Rd 4, 2006	Rd 17, 2007	12
13	Michael Crocker	Rd 8, 2006	Rd 8, 2006	1
14	Cooper Cronk	Rd 2, 2007	Rd 13, 2017	21
15	Dallas Johnson	Rd 3, 2007	Rd 3, 2007	1
16	Matt King	Rd 8, 2007	Rd 14, 2007	2
17	Adam Blair	Rd 14, 2010	Rd 14, 2011	2
18	Ryan Hoffman	Rd 14, 2012	Rd 14, 2012	1
19	Ryan Hinchcliffe	Rd 15, 2013	Rd 14, 2015	4
20	Jesse Bromwich	Rd 15, 2016	Elimination final, 2022	53 (Note: 6 games prior to 2021; 15 games as co-captain with Dale Finucane in 2021.)
21	Billy Slater	Rd 11, 2018	Rd 11, 2018	1
22	Kenny Bromwich	Rd 15, 2020	Rd 15, 2020	1
23	Ryan Papenhuyzen	Rd 20, 2020	Rd 25, 2024	2 (Note: 1 game as co-captain with Cameron Munster in 2024.)
24	Dale Finucane	Rd 7, 2021	Preliminary final, 2021	17 (Note: 15 games as co-captain with Jesse Bromwich in 2021.)
25	Christian Welch	Rd 1, 2022	Preliminary final, 2023	26
26	Jahrome Hughes	Rd 6, 2022	Rd 12, 2026	12 (Note: 5 games as co-captain with Cameron Munster in 2025.)
27	Josh King	Rd 27, 2023	Rd 22, 2026	2
28	Harry Grant	Rd 1, 2024	Incumbent	63
29	Cameron Munster	Rd 25, 2024	Rd 13, 2025	9 (Note: 1 game as co-captain with Ryan Papenhuyzen in 2024, and 5 games as co-captain with Jahrome Hughes in 2025.)

=== Coaches ===
==== NRL ====
#	Name	Tenure	Games	W	D	L	%
1	Chris Anderson	1998 – Round 7, 2001	89	53	2	34	60.7%
2	Mark Murray	Round 8, 2001 – 2002	43	18	2	23	44.2%
3	Craig Bellamy	2003–present	628	432	2	194	68.95%

==== NRL Under-20s ====
#	Name	Tenure	Games	W	D	L	%
1	Brad Arthur	2008–2009	51	30	1	20	58.8%
2	Dean Pay	2010–2012	74	37	4	33	50.0%
3	Anthony Seibold	2013	24	11	0	13	45.8%
4	Matt Adamson	2014	24	12	0	12	50.0%
5	Marc Brentnall	2015	24	10	1	13	41.7%
6	Eric Smith	2016–2017	47	17	1	29	36.2%

=== Chair ===
No.	Name	Tenure	Notes
1.	Ken Cowley	1998–2002	
2.	None (Note: No formal chair noted during this period.)	2002–2006	
3.	Rob Moodie	2006–2010	
4.	Stephen Rue	2011–2013	
5.	Bart Campbell	2013–2020	
6.	Matt Tripp	2020–present	

=== CEOs ===
No.	Name	Tenure	Notes
1.	Chris Johns	1997 – October 2002	
2.	John Ribot	October 2002 – March 2004	Title initially was executive director (1997–2004)
3.	Frank Stanton	March – September 2004	Interim
4.	Brian Waldron	September 2004 – January 2010	
5.	Matt Hanson	January – April 2010	
-	Frank Stanton	April – July 2010	Acting
6.	Ron Gauci	July 2010 – May 2013	
7.	Mark Evans	May 2013 – June 2015	
8.	Dave Donaghy	June 2015 – October 2020	
9.	Ashley Tucker	October 2020 – February 2021	Interim
10.	Justin Rodski	February 2021 – present	

=== Life members ===
Starting in 2005, Melbourne Storm has recognised significant figures in the history of the club, by awarding them life membership.

No.	Name	Year	Notes
1.	Matt Geyer	2005	Player 1998–2008 – 262 games with Melbourne; co-captain 2006–2007
2.	Robbie Kearns	2005	Player 1998–2005 – 169 games with Melbourne; captain 2000–2002, 2005
3.	Chris Anderson	2006	Coach 1998–2001 – 1999 premiership coach
4.	John Ribot	2006	Executive director 1998–2004; CEO 2003–2004
5.	Greg Brentnall	2007	Assistant coach 1998–2000; football manager 2001–2004
6.	Scott Hill	2007	Player 1998–2006 – 177 games with Melbourne; co-captain 2006
7.	Dallas Johnson	2008	Player 2003–2009 – 157 games with Melbourne; co-captain 2007
8.	Cameron Smith	2009	Player 2002–2021 – 430 games with Melbourne; captain 2006–2020
9.	Craig Bellamy	2010	Coach 2003–present – ~~2007~~, ~~2009~~, 2012, 2017, 2020 Premiership coach
10.	Stephen Kearney	2010	Player 1999–2004 – 139 games with Melbourne; captain 2003–2004; assistant coach 2006–2010, 2021–2022
11.	Jonce Dimovski	2011	Football Department
12.	Peter Robinson	2011	Player 2000–2005 – 75 games with Melbourne; player wellbeing and development 2006–present
13.	Billy Slater	2011	Player 2003–2018 – 319 games with Melbourne; specialist coach 2019–present
14.	Alex Corvo	2012	Football Department (physical performance manager) 2002–2013
15.	Cooper Cronk	2012	Player 2004–2017 – 323 games with Melbourne
16.	Tony Devers	2013	Sponsor (Suzuki Australia)
17.	Ryan Hoffman	2013	Player 2003–2010, 2012–2014, 2018 – 265 games with Melbourne; football operations manager 2019–2022
18.	Ryan Hinchcliffe	2015	Player 2009–2015 – 175 games with Melbourne; development coach 2019–present
19.	Julie Cliff	2015	Administration 2001–2016
20.	Brian Phelan	2016	Player welfare manager 2006–present
21.	Kevin Proctor	2016	Player 2008–2016 – 179 games with Melbourne
22.	Frank Ponissi	2017	Football manager 2007–present
23.	Jesse Bromwich	2018	Player 2010–2022 – 295 games with Melbourne; co-captain 2021–2022
24.	Adam O'Brien	2018	Assistant coach 2008–2018
25.	John Donehue	2018	Defensive consultant 2001–present
26.	Dan Di Pasqua	2019	Performance coach
27.	Will Chambers	2019	Player 2007–2009, 2012–2019 – 215 games with Melbourne
28.	Gerry Ryan	2022	Sponsor; board member and shareholder 2013–present
29.	Ross Patison	2022	Administration 2007–2024
30.	Kenny Bromwich	2022	Player 2013–2022 – 216 games with Melbourne
31.	Danielle Smith	2022	Administration 2011–2023
32.	Paul Bunn	2023	Recruitment manager 2012–present
33.	Justin Dixon	2023	Administration 2009–present
34.	Tawera Nikau	2023	Player 1998–1999 – 53 games with Melbourne
35.	Christian Welch	2024	Player 2015–2024 – 163 games with Melbourne; captain 2022–2023
36.	Nelson Asofa-Solomona	2024	Player 2015–2025 – 215 games with Melbourne
37.	Cameron Munster	2024	Player 2014–present
38.	Ashley Tucker	2024	Administration 2013–present
39.	Bart Campbell	2025	Chairman 2013–2020, board member and shareholder 2013–present
40.	Matt Tripp	2025	Chairman 2020–present, board member and shareholder 2013–present
41.	Marc Brentnall	2025	Assistant coach (various roles) 2013–present
42.	Aaron Bellamy	2025	Assistant coach (various roles) 2012–present
43.	Jason Chan	2026	Chief medical officer 2014–2024
44.	Tui Kamikamica	2026	Player 2017–2026 – 142 games with Melbourne
45.	Jahrome Hughes	2026	Player 2017–present

== Individual competition honours ==
=== NRL ===
==== NRL Hall of Fame ====
Inducted for their contribution to the rugby league in Australia and New Zealand.

- 2008 – Glenn Lazarus (95th inductee)
- 2024 – Cameron Smith (120th inductee)
- 2024 – Billy Slater (122nd inductee)
- 2024 – Cooper Cronk (124th inductee)
- 2024 – Greg Inglis (125th inductee)

==== Clive Churchill Medal ====
Awarded to NRL Grand Final Player of the Match

- 1999 – Brett Kimmorley
- 2007 – Greg Inglis
- 2009 – Billy Slater
- 2012 – Cooper Cronk
- 2017 – Billy Slater
- 2020 – Ryan Papenhuyzen

==== Dally M Medal ====
Awarded to NRL Player of the Year

- 2006 – Cameron Smith
- 2011 – Billy Slater
- 2013 – Cooper Cronk
- 2016 – Cooper Cronk
- 2017 – Cameron Smith
- 2024 – Jahrome Hughes

==== Preston Campbell Medal ====
Awarded to NRL All-Stars Player of the Match

- 2020 – Brandon Smith

=== State of Origin ===
==== Wally Lewis Medal ====
Awarded to State of Origin series Player of the Year

- 2007 – Cameron Smith
- 2009 – Greg Inglis
- 2010 – Billy Slater
- 2011 – Cameron Smith
- 2013 – Cameron Smith
- 2016 – Cameron Smith
- 2018 – Billy Slater
- 2020 – Cameron Munster

==== Ron McAuliffe Medal ====
Awarded to Queensland State of Origin Player of the Year

- 2005 – Cameron Smith
- 2007 – Cameron Smith
- 2009 – Greg Inglis
- 2013 – Cameron Smith
- 2015 – Cameron Smith
- 2018 – Billy Slater

==== Brad Fittler Medal ====
Awarded to New South Wales State of Origin Player of the Year

- 2005 – Matt King
- 2014 – Ryan Hoffman

==== State of Origin Man of the Match ====
Awarded at the end of each State of Origin game

- 1998 (Game 2) – Rodney Howe
- 2004 (Game 2) – Billy Slater
- 2007 (Game 1) – Cameron Smith
- 2008 (Game 2) – Greg Inglis
- 2008 (Game 3) – Israel Folau
- 2010 (Game 3) – Billy Slater
- 2011 (Game 1) – Cameron Smith
- 2011 (Game 3) – Cameron Smith
- 2013 (Game 2) – Cameron Smith
- 2015 (Game 1) – Cameron Smith
- 2016 (Game 2) – Cameron Smith
- 2017 (Game 3) – Cameron Smith
- 2018 (Game 3) – Billy Slater
- 2020 (Game 3) – Cameron Munster
- 2022 (Game 1) – Cameron Munster
- 2025 (Game 2) – Cameron Munster

=== International ===
==== IRL Hall of Legends ====
Inaugurated in 2026 to celebrate players contributions to international rugby league

- 2026 — Cameron Smith
- 2026 — Billy Slater

==== IRL Golden Boot Award ====
Awarded annually to the world's best rugby league player (since 2018 awarded for performances in international matches)

- 2007 – Cameron Smith
- 2008 – Billy Slater
- 2009 – Greg Inglis
- 2016 – Cooper Cronk
- 2017 – Cameron Smith
- 2025 – Harry Grant

==== Rugby League International Federation Player of the Year ====
Awarded to World's Best Rugby League Player of the Year

- 2008 – Billy Slater
- 2011 – Billy Slater
- 2012 – Cameron Smith

==== Harry Sunderland Medal ====
Awarded to the Australia player's player in end of season test matches (since 2004).

- 2009 – Greg Inglis (Four Nations)
- 2014 – Cameron Smith (Four Nations)
- 2017 – Cameron Smith (World Cup)
- 2025 – Cameron Munster (Ashes)

==== Fulton–Reilly Award ====
Awarded to the player of the Rugby League Ashes series

- 2025 – Cameron Munster

==== World Club Challenge Medal ====
Awarded to World Club Challenge Player of the Match

- 2000 – Brett Kimmorley
- 2010 – Cameron Smith
- 2013 – Cooper Cronk
- 2018 – Nelson Asofa-Solomona

==== NRL Nines Team of the Tournament ====
- 2016 – Tohu Harris
- 2017 – Cameron Munster & Brodie Croft

=== Other Awards ===
==== Rugby League Players Association ====
- 2006 Best Back – Greg Inglis
- 2006 Men's Academic Player of the Year – Matt Geyer
- 2013 Men's Academic Player of the Year – Bryan Norrie
- 2014 NRL Under-20s Academic Player of the Year (Education) – Christian Welch
- 2017 NRL Under-20s Player of the Year – Harry Grant
- 2015 Rookie of the Year – Cameron Munster
- 2017 The Players' 13 Dream Team – Cameron Smith (hooker)
- 2018 The Players' 13 Dream Team – Cameron Munster (five-eighth) & Nelson Asofa-Solomona (front row)
- 2019 The Players' 13 Dream Team – Cameron Munster (five-eighth), Cameron Smith (hooker) & Kenny Bromwich (second row)
- 2020 The Players' 13 Dream Team – Cameron Smith (hooker)
- 2021 The Players' 13 Dream Team – Justin Olam (centre) & Brandon Smith (hooker)
- 2022 The Players' 13 Dream Team – Justin Olam (Centre) & Cameron Munster (five-eighth)
- 2023 The Players' 13 Dream Team – Cameron Munster (five-eighth) & Harry Grant (hooker)
- 2023 Academic Team of the Year – Tyran Wishart
- 2024 Men's Academic Award and Academic Team of the Year – Christian Welch
- 2024 The Players' Dream Team – Jahrome Hughes (halfback); Harry Grant (hooker) & Eliesa Katoa (second row)
- 2024 The Players' Champion – Jahrome Hughes
- 2025 The Players' Dream Team – Xavier Coates (wing); Harry Grant (hooker) & Eliesa Katoa (second row)
- 2026 Rookie of the Year – Cooper Clarke

==== Sprit of ANZAC Medal ====
Awarded to ANZAC Day Player of the Match.

- 2009 – Adam Blair
- 2010 – Cooper Cronk
- 2012 – Kevin Proctor
- 2013 – Ryan Hoffman
- 2016 – Tohu Harris
- 2017 – Nelson Asofa-Solomona
- 2018 – Billy Slater
- 2019 – Cameron Smith
- 2021 – Jahrome Hughes
- 2022 – Ryan Papenhuyzen
- 2023 – Nick Meaney
- 2024 – Cameron Munster
- 2025 – Eliesa Katoa

=== NRL Under-20s ===
==== Jack Gibson Medal ====
Awarded to NRL Under-20s Grand Final Player of the Match

- 2009 – Luke Kelly

==== NRL Under-20s Player of the Year ====
- 2017 – Harry Grant

=== Melbourne Storm Pre-Season ===
==== I Don't Quit Iron Bar ====
Awarded to the best newly recruited player during pre-season boot camp and nominated by military facilitators.

- 2009 – Ryan Hinchcliffe
- 2010 –
- 2011 –
- 2012 – Slade Griffin
- 2013 – Matt Duffie
- 2014 –
- 2015 – Dale Finucane
- 2016 – Tui Kamikamica
- 2017 – Brandon Smith
- 2018 – Tom Eisenhuth
- 2019 – Aaron Booth
- 2021 – Josh King
- 2022 – Tyran Wishart

== Melbourne Storm Player of the Year Awards ==
The below awards are all handed out at the annual Melbourne Storm Player of the Year Awards night held at the conclusion of the NRL season.

=== Cameron Smith Player of the Year ===
Award renamed "Cameron Smith Player of the Year Award" as of 2022 Melbourne Storm Awards Night.

- 1998 – Robbie Kearns
- 1999 – Brett Kimmorley
- 2000 – Rodney Howe
- 2001 – Richard Swain
- 2002 – Rodney Howe (2nd)
- 2003 – Robbie Kearns (2nd)
- 2004 – Matt Orford
- 2005 – Cameron Smith
- 2006 – Cameron Smith (2nd)
- 2007 – Cameron Smith (3rd)
- 2008 – Billy Slater
- 2009 – Billy Slater (2nd)
- 2010 – Ryan Hinchcliffe
- 2011 – Cameron Smith (4th)
- 2012 – Cameron Smith (5th)
- 2013 – Cameron Smith (6th)
- 2014 – Jesse Bromwich
- 2015 – Jesse Bromwich (2nd)
- 2016 – Jesse Bromwich (3rd)
- 2017 – Cameron Smith (7th)
- 2018 – Cameron Munster
- 2019 – Dale Finucane
- 2020 – Cameron Smith (8th)
- 2021 – Jahrome Hughes
- 2022 – Cameron Munster (2nd)
- 2023 – Xavier Coates
- 2024 – Jahrome Hughes (2nd)
- 2025 – Xavier Coates (2nd)
- 2026 – Sualauvi Fa'alogo

=== Members' Player of the Year ===
- 2007 – Billy Slater
- 2008 – Billy Slater
- 2009 – Billy Slater
- 2010 – Cooper Cronk
- 2011 – Cooper Cronk
- 2012 – Ryan Hoffman
- 2013 – Cameron Smith
- 2014 – Cooper Cronk
- 2015 – Cooper Cronk & Jesse Bromwich
- 2016 – Cameron Smith
- 2017 – Cameron Smith
- 2018 – Cameron Munster
- 2019 – Cameron Smith
- 2020 – Ryan Papenhuyzen
- 2021 – Jahrome Hughes
- 2022 – Cameron Munster
- 2023 – Nick Meaney
- 2024 – Jahrome Hughes
- 2025 – Eliesa Katoa
- 2026 – Sualauvi Fa'alogo

=== Billy Slater Rookie of the Year ===
Award renamed "Billy Slater Rookie of the Year Award" as of 2018 Melbourne Storm Awards Night.

- 1998 – Ben Roarty
- 1999 – Matt Rua
- 2000 – Tasesa Lavea
- 2001 – Steven Bell
- 2002 – Michael Russo
- 2003 – Cameron Smith
- 2004 – Matt King
- 2005 – Brett White
- 2006 – Adam Blair
- 2007 – Israel Folau
- 2008 – Aiden Tolman
- 2009 – Kevin Proctor
- 2010 – Matt Duffie
- 2011 – Gareth Widdop & Jesse Bromwich
- 2012 – Mahe Fonua
- 2013 – Tohu Harris
- 2014 – Kurt Mann
- 2015 – Cameron Munster
- 2016 – Suliasi Vunivalu
- 2017 – Curtis Scott
- 2018 – Brandon Smith
- 2019 – Ryan Papenhuyzen
- 2020 – Tino Fa'asuamaleaui
- 2021 – Dean Ieremia
- 2022 – Tyran Wishart
- 2023 – Will Warbrick
- 2024 – Jack Howarth
- 2025 – Ativalu Lisati
- 2026 – Cooper Clarke

=== Most Improved Player of the Year ===
- 2005 – Jake Webster
- 2006 – Cooper Cronk
- 2007 – Jeff Lima
- 2008 – Sika Manu
- 2009 – Aiden Tolman
- 2010 – Dane Neilsen
- 2011 – Kevin Proctor
- 2012 – Sisa Waqa
- 2013 – Kenny Bromwich
- 2014 – Jordan McLean
- 2015 – Tim Glasby
- 2016 – Cameron Munster
- 2017 – Felise Kaufusi
- 2018 – Christian Welch
- 2019 – Tui Kamikamica
- 2020 – Justin Olam
- 2021 – Nicho Hynes
- 2022 – Marion Seve
- 2023 – Bronson Garlick
- 2024 – Trent Loiero
- 2025 – Grant Anderson
- 2026 – Sualauvi Fa'alogo

=== Back of the Year ===
- 2005 – Matt King
- 2006 – Greg Inglis
- 2007 – Billy Slater
- 2008 – Cooper Cronk
- 2009 – Greg Inglis
- 2010 – Cooper Cronk
- 2011 – Billy Slater
- 2012 – Cooper Cronk
- 2013 – Cooper Cronk
- 2014 – Cooper Cronk
- 2015 – Cameron Munster
- 2016 – Cooper Cronk
- 2017 – Will Chambers
- 2018 – Billy Slater
- 2019 – Jahrome Hughes
- 2020 – Ryan Papenhuyzen
- 2021 – Ryan Papenhuyzen
- 2022 – Ryan Papenhuyzen & Nick Meaney
- 2023 – Will Warbrick
- 2024 – Will Warbrick
- 2025 – Ryan Papenhuyzen
- 2026 – Tyran Wishart

=== Forward of the Year ===
- 2005 – Dallas Johnson
- 2006 – Ryan Hoffman
- 2007 – Dallas Johnson
- 2008 – Jeff Lima
- 2009 – Cameron Smith
- 2010 – Cameron Smith
- 2011 – Ryan Hinchcliffe
- 2012 – Ryan Hoffman
- 2013 – Jesse Bromwich
- 2014 – Cameron Smith
- 2015 – Cameron Smith
- 2016 – Cameron Smith
- 2017 – Jesse Bromwich
- 2018 – Dale Finucane
- 2019 – Cameron Smith
- 2020 – Brandon Smith
- 2021 – Brandon Smith
- 2022 – Harry Grant
- 2023 – Josh King
- 2024 – Harry Grant
- 2025 – Eliesa Katoa
- 2026 – Stefano Utoikamanu

=== Cooper Cronk Medal ===
For NSW Cup Player of the Year. Award was previously known as the "Cooper Cronk Feeder Player of the Year Award" from 2017 through 2025.

- 2010 – Jesse Bromwich (Note: NSW Cup Player of the Year)
- 2016 – Joe Stimson
- 2017 – Brodie Croft
- 2018 – Scott Drinkwater
- 2019 – Harry Grant
- 2020 – Isaac Lumelume
- 2021 – Marion Seve
- 2022 – Sualauvi Fa'alogo
- 2023 – Sualauvi Fa'alogo (2)
- 2024 – Lazarus Vaalepu
- 2025 – Siulagi Tuimalatu-Brown
- 2026 – Angus Hinchey

=== Darren Bell U21's Player of the Year ===
Award renamed "Darren Bell Under 21's Player of the Year Award" after the death of the Melbourne Storm Recruitment Scout in 2011.

- 2008 – Louis Fanene
- 2009 – Gareth Widdop
- 2010 – Tohu Harris
- 2011 – Slade Griffin
- 2012 – Young Tonumaipea
- 2013 – Pride Petterson-Robati
- 2014 – Nelson Asofa-Solomona
- 2015 – Latrell Robinson
- 2016 – Louis Geraghty
- 2017 – Harry Grant
- 2018 – Trent Toelau
- 2019 – Trent Toelau
- 2021 – Antonio Sanele
- 2022 – Cole Geyer
- 2023 – Poasi Manu
- 2024 – Angus Hinchey
- 2025 – Preston Conn
- 2026 – Lucas Hinchey

=== Greg Brentnall Young Achievers Award ===
Award named after chairman of Victoria Rugby League, Greg Brentnall and presented to the most outstanding under 18 year old.

- 2009 – Lucas Grech
- 2010 – Richard Kennar
- 2011 – Mahe Fonua
- 2012 – Young Tonumaipea
- 2013 – Brandon Manase
- 2014 – Charnze Nicoll-Klokstad
- 2015 – Aaron Teroi
- 2016 – Ben Nakubuwai
- 2017 – Jordin Leiu
- 2018 – Haele Finau
- 2019 – Kruz Niutili-Schmidt
- 2021 – Jay Natapu
- 2022 – Jared Nauma
- 2023 – Dickie Terapo
- 2024 – Chase Paterson
- 2025 – Cooper Clarke
- 2026 – Hayden Watson

=== Melbourne Storm Academy Player of the Year ===
- 2023 – Keagan Russell-Smith
- 2024 – Angus Hinchey
- 2025 – Siulagi Tuimalatu-Brown
- 2026 – Hayden Watson

=== Best Try of the Year ===
- 2014 – Young Tonumaipea (Round 6 vs St George Illawarra)
- 2015 – Marika Koroibete (Round 19 vs Penrith)
- 2017 – Kenny Bromwich (Qualifying final vs Parramatta)
- 2018 – Josh Addo-Carr (Round 8 vs New Zealand)
- 2019 – Josh Addo-Carr (Semi-final vs Parramatta)
- 2020 – Ryan Papenhuyzen (Round 12 vs Newcastle)
- 2021 – George Jennings (Round 18 vs Newcastle)
- 2022 – Ryan Papenhuyzen (Round 7 vs New Zealand)
- 2023 – Sualauvi Fa'alogo (Round 27 vs Brisbane)
- 2024 – Xavier Coates (Round 2 vs New Zealand)
- 2025 – Harry Grant (Round 24 vs Penrith)
- 2026 – Sualauvi Fa'alogo (Round 9 vs Dolphins)

== Stadium records ==
- For consistency due to continual sponsorship changes over time, stadiums are listed as their official or most well known name

=== Primary Home Grounds used by the Storm ===
From	To	Stadium	Capacity
1998	2000	Olympic Park Stadium	18,500
2001	2001	Docklands Stadium	56,347
2002	2009	Olympic Park Stadium	18,500
2010	present	Melbourne Rectangular Stadium	30,050

=== Secondary Home Grounds used by the Storm ===
From	To	Stadium	Capacity	Comment
1999	1999	Sydney Football Stadium, Sydney	45,500	Used for the semi-final vs Canterbury-Bankstown Bulldogs and preliminary final vs Parramatta Eels, on match records Melbourne are listed as the first team therefore are the home team.
2000	2000	Melbourne Cricket Ground, Melbourne	100,000	Used for two blockbuster games vs St. George Illawarra Dragons and Cronulla-Sutherland Sharks.
2006	2006	Stadium Australia, Sydney	83,500	Used for the preliminary final vs St. George Illawarra Dragons. Since this match all home finals have been played in Melbourne (except for 2020 & 2021).
2007	2023	Docklands Stadium, Melbourne	56,347	Used for sporadic regular season games and finals games until 2010 when the Melbourne Rectangular Stadium opened. In 2023 the stadium hosted two home games when their regular home ground was being used for the 2023 FIFA Women's World Cup.
2015	2015	McLean Park, Napier	19,700	Used for one home game in 2015; was the first time the club sold a regular season home game outside Melbourne.
2016	present	Lang Park, Brisbane	52,500	Used for one annual double-header game (2016–2018), NRL Magic Round (2019, 2021–2025). In 2020 was used for one home game and two home finals; in 2021 was used for two home games due to the COVID-19 pandemic in Melbourne forcing the club to relocate.
2020	2020	Kogarah Oval, Sydney	20,500	Used for one home game due to the COVID-19 pandemic in Melbourne forcing the club to relocate.
2020	2021	Sunshine Coast Stadium, Sunshine Coast	12,000	Used for six home games in 2020 and three home games and one home final in 2021 due to the COVID-19 pandemic in Melbourne forcing the club to relocate.
2021	2021	Robina Stadium, Gold Coast	27,400	Used for one home game in 2021 due to the COVID-19 pandemic in Melbourne forcing the club to relocate.
2026	2026	Perth Oval, Perth	20,500	Used for one home match in 2026 ahead of the entry of the Perth Bears into the NRL in 2027.

=== Attendances ===
Note: From 2016 to 2018, Melbourne Storm played one "home" fixture per year at Suncorp Stadium in Brisbane as part of a double header. These statistics have not been included on this table below, as the Suncorp Stadium capacity is significantly higher than home venues in Melbourne. Crowd numbers are distorted due to the games being double headers; it is not known how much of the crowd are there for the Storm game and how many are there for the other featured game.

==== Top 5 home attendances (regular season) — matches played in Melbourne ====
Crowd	Stadium	Opponent	Comment	Date
28,716	Melbourne Rectangular Stadium	New Zealand Warriors	ANZAC Day	25 April 2014
28,245	Melbourne Rectangular Stadium	Brisbane Broncos	—N/a	20 March 2026
26,829	Docklands Stadium	Penrith Panthers	—N/a	30 June 2023
26,427	Melbourne Rectangular Stadium	New Zealand Warriors	—N/a	13 April 2025
26,106	Melbourne Rectangular Stadium	Dolphins	—N/a	24 August 2024

==== Top 5 home attendances (finals) ====
Crowd	Stadium	Opponent	Comment	Date
37,112	Lang Park	Canberra Raiders	Preliminary final	16 October 2020
33,427	Docklands Stadium	Parramatta Eels	Preliminary final	23 September 2007
29,315	Melbourne Rectangular Stadium	North Queensland Cowboys	Preliminary final	26 September 2015
29,233	Melbourne Rectangular Stadium	Cronulla-Sutherland Sharks	Preliminary final	26 September 2025
29,213	Melbourne Rectangular Stadium	Sydney Roosters	Preliminary final	27 September 2024

== Uniform sponsors and manufacturers ==
Year	Kit manufacturer	Chest sponsor (main)	Chest sponsor (minor)	Back sponsors (top)	Back sponsors (bottom)	Sleeve sponsors	Shorts sponsors (front)	Shorts sponsors (back)
1998	Nike	—N/a	—N/a	Player names	—N/a	None (R1 – R24); Honda (finals)	—N/a	—N/a
1999	Fila	—N/a	—N/a	Player names	—N/a	Honda	—N/a	—N/a
2000	Fila	—N/a	—N/a	Player names	—N/a	Honda	—N/a	—N/a
2001	Fila	Adecco	—N/a	Player names	—N/a	Honda	Accpac	—N/a
2002	Fila	Adecco	—N/a	Adecco	—N/a	Honda	Accpac	Europcar
2003	Canterbury	Adecco	—N/a	Adecco	—N/a	Honda	Accpac	Crazy John's
2004	Canterbury	Adecco	—N/a	Adecco	—N/a	—N/a	—N/a	—N/a
2005	Reebok	Adecco	—N/a	Adecco	—N/a	Medibank Private	—N/a	—N/a
2006	Reebok	Medibank Private	—N/a	Hostplus	Hostplus	None (R1 – R6); Mortgage House (R7 – GF)	None (R1 – R26); Jayco (finals)	None (R1 – R26); Jayco (finals)
2007	Reebok	Medibank Private	—N/a	Hostplus	Hostplus	Mortgage House	Jayco	Jayco
2008	Reebok	Medibank Private	—N/a	Hostplus	Hostplus	Suzuki	Jayco	Jayco
2009	KooGa	ME Bank	—N/a	Hostplus	Hostplus	Suzuki	Jayco	Jayco
2010	KooGa	ME Bank (R1 – R6); Jayco (R7 – R26)	—N/a	Hostplus (R1 – R6); Suzuki (R7 – R26)	Hostplus (R1 – R6); Jayco (R7 – R26)	Suzuki	Makita	Jayco
2011	KooGa	Crown	—N/a	None (R1 – R26); Harvey Norman (finals)	None (R1 – R26); Harvey Norman (finals)	Suzuki	Makita	Jayco
2012	KooGa	Crown	—N/a	None (R1 – R10); Programmed (R11 – finals)	None (R1 – R26); Anzac Biscuits (finals)	Suzuki	Makita	Harvey Norman
2013	KooGa	Crown	—N/a	Programmed	None (R1 – R16); Tigerair (R17 – finals)	Suzuki	None (R1 – R26); Hostplus (finals)	None (R1 – R26); Hostplus
2014	BLK	Crown Resorts	—N/a	Programmed	Tigerair	Suzuki	@Storm or blank (R1 – R23); Jayco	@Storm (R1 – R9); Lumo (R10 – finals)
2015	BLK	Crown Resorts	Spot Jobs	PSC Insurance Brokers	Tigerair	Suzuki	Whitehorse Truck Centre	Metsal
2016	Star Athletic	Crown Resorts	Spot Jobs	Hostplus	Tigerair	Suzuki	Whitehorse Truck Centre	Metsal
2017	ISC	Crown Resorts	Tigerair	Hostplus	Tigerair	Suzuki	Fuso	None (R1 – R12); Quit2beFit (R13 – finals)
2018	ISC	Crown Resorts	Tigerair	Fuso	Tigerair	Suzuki	Hostplus	Hostplus
2019	ISC	Purple Bricks	Tigerair	Fuso	Tigerair	Suzuki	Hostplus	Hostplus
2020	ISC	RedZed Lending Solutions	Tigerair (R1 – R17); Rockcote (R18 – finals)	Grill'd	Tigerair (R1 – R17) fuelyourlife.com.au (Rd 18 – finals)	Suzuki	Hostplus	Hostplus
2021	Castore	RedZed Lending Solutions	Suzuki	Grill'd	Tradie	None (R1 – R3); Carsales (R4 – R22)	Hostplus	Hostplus
2022	Castore	RedZed Lending Solutions	Suzuki	Grill'd	Tradie	Carsales	Hostplus	Hostplus
2023	Castore	RedZed Lending Solutions	Suzuki	Grill'd	Tradie	Carsales	Bad Boy Mowers	Fujitsu Airstage
2024	O'Neills	RedZed Lending Solutions	Suzuki	Grill'd	Tradie	Carsales	Fiji Airways	None (R1 – R18); Lotus Living (R20 – finals)
2025	O'Neills	RedZed Lending Solutions	Suzuki	Grill'd	Tradie	Carsales	Fiji Airways	Lotus Living
2026	O'Neills	RedZed Lending Solutions	Suzuki	Grill'd	Tradie	Budget Direct	Fiji Airways	Big Ant Studios
