= Sualauvi Fa'alogo =

Samoa international rugby league footballer

Sua Fa'alogo
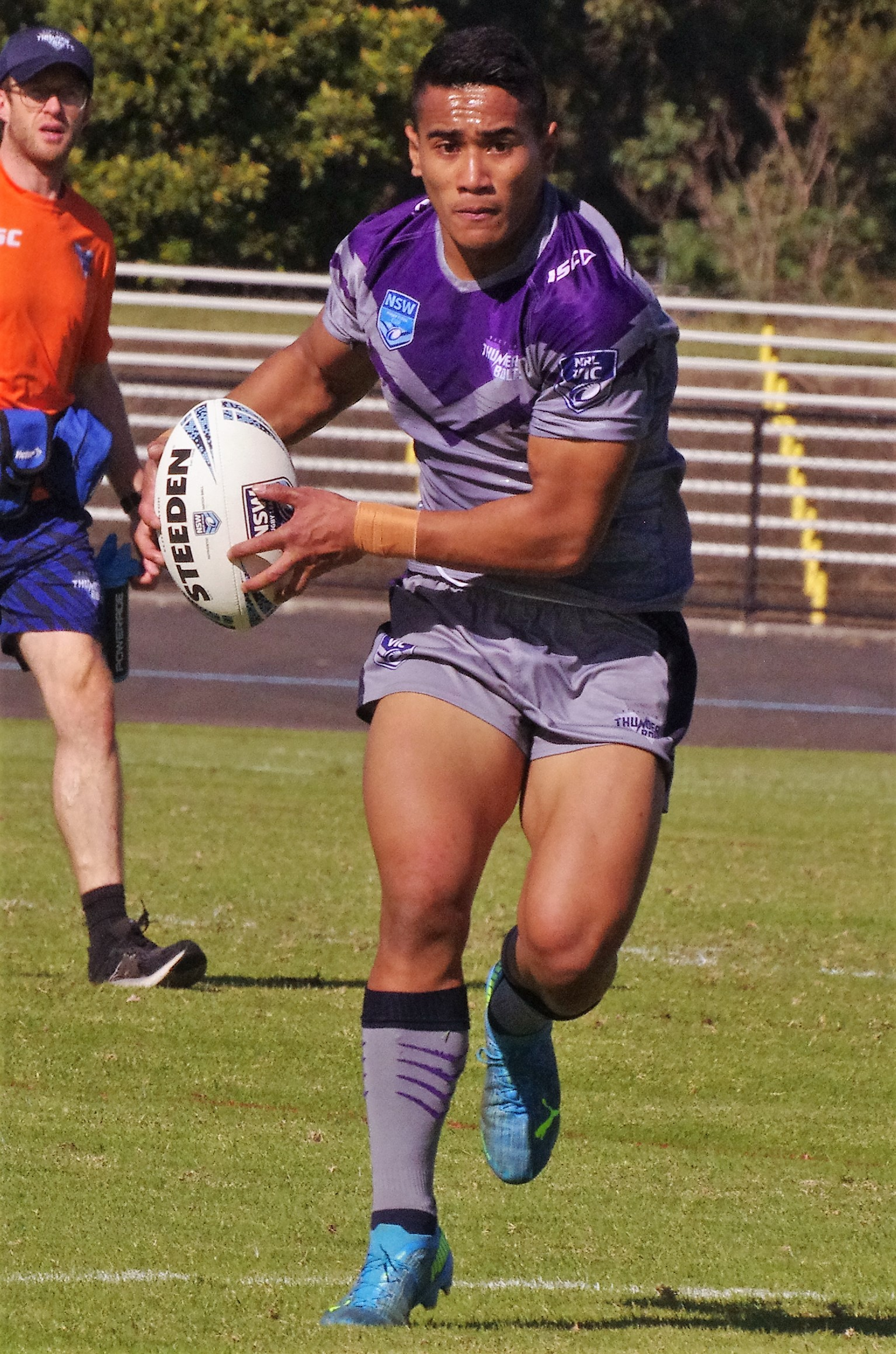

Personal information
- Full name: Sualauvi Fa'alogo
- Born: 19 March 2003 (age 23) Siumu, Samoa
- Height: 175 cm (5 ft 9 in)
- Weight: 82 kg (12 st 13 lb)

Playing information
- Position: Fullback, Wing
Club
Years	Team	Pld	T	G	FG	P
2023–	Melbourne Storm	46	32	11	0	146
Representative
Years	Team	Pld	T	G	FG	P
2023–	Samoa	6	6	0	0	24
- Source: As of 15 November 2026

Sualauvi Fa'alogo (born 19 March 2003) is a Samoan professional rugby league footballer who plays as a fullback or winger for the Melbourne Storm in the NRL and Samoa at international level.

== Early life ==
Fa'alogo was born in Samoa and raised in Melbourne, Australia after his family moved to Australia when he was nine years old. While living in Melbourne, he was educated at Mount Ridley College, Craigieburn. Fa'alogo is the youngest of nine children, having five brothers and three sisters.

He played his junior rugby league for the Northern Thunder in the Melbourne Rugby League and then graduated through the Victorian Thunderbolts system before signing with Melbourne Storm.

== Playing career ==
=== 2023 ===
Fa'alogo made his NRL debut in round 27 of the 2023 NRL season for the Melbourne Storm against Broncos at Suncorp Stadium in which he scored two tries. He was presented with Melbourne jersey (cap number 231) scoring two tries on debut. Fa'alogo became the fifth player to graduate from the NRL Victoria junior system to the Melbourne Storm.

At the 2023 Melbourne Storm Player of the Year Awards, Fa'alogo was awarded his second successive Cooper Cronk Feeder Player of the Year award, after another consistent season player with Storm feeder club the Sunshine Coast Falcons. He would also take out the club's try of the year award for his debut try against the Brisbane Broncos.

Fa'alogo was selected to represent Samoa for the 2023 Pacific Rugby League Championships.

=== 2024 ===
On 29 February it was announced that Fa'alogo has signed a new contract to stay with the Melbourne Storm until the end of the 2028 NRL season, also earning a promotion to the club's top-30 squad. On 29 September, Fa'alogo played for North Sydney in their NSW Cup Grand Final loss against Newtown.

=== 2025 ===
On 1 July, it was announced that Fa'alogo would be ruled out for an indefinite period after suffering a grade three hamstring tear in Melbourne's victory over Cronulla.

=== 2026 ===
Fa'alogo began the 2026 very strongly assuming the full time fullback role following the retirement of incumbent Ryan Papenhuyzen. Fa'alogo scored five tries, including a hat-trick, in the opening two games of the season to cement himself in the position. Fa'alogo played 24 games for Melbourne in the 2026 NRL season and scored 18 tries the club finished 10th on the table, missing the finals for the first time since 2010.

== Statistics ==
Year	Team	Games	Tries	Goals	Pts
2023	Melbourne Storm	1	2		8
2024	Melbourne Storm	14	8		32
2025	Melbourne Storm	7	4		16
2026	Melbourne Storm	24	18	11	94
2027	Melbourne Storm				
	Totals	47	32	11	150

== Honours ==
- Cameron Smith Player of the Year: 2026
- Melbourne Storm Members Player of the Year: 2026
- Melbourne Storm Most Improved Player of the Year: 2026
- Cooper Cronk Feeder Player of the Year: 2022, 2023
- Melbourne Storm Best Try of the Year: 2023, 2026
