= 2015 Melbourne Storm season =

- NRL Rank: 4th
- Play-off result: Preliminary Final Loss
- 2015 record: Wins: 14; draws: 0; losses: 10
- Points scored: For: 467; against: 348

Team information
- CEO: Mark Evans; Dave Donaghy
- Coach: Craig Bellamy
- Captain: Cameron Smith (25 Games) Ryan Hinchcliffe (1 Game)
- Stadium: AAMI Park – 30,050

Top scorers
- Tries: Marika Koroibete (16)
- Goals: Cameron Smith (71)
- Points: Cameron Smith (146)
← 2014	List of seasons	2016 →

The 2015 Melbourne Storm season is the 18th in the club's history. They competed in the 2015 NRL season and were coached by Craig Bellamy, who was coach for the 13th consecutive season and captained by Cameron Smith, sole captain for the 8th consecutive season. He played his 300th NRL Game in Round 19 becoming only the 24th player in history to do so.

With the youngest Storm side assembled under Craig Bellamy, the team finished with a 14–10 record for the second consecutive season, securing a top-four spot on the final day of the season. In Week One of the finals, they played the minor premiers, the Sydney Roosters, who entered the match following a 12-game winning streak. The Storm won by two points but did not reach the Grand Final, losing to the Cowboys at home two weeks later. The Storm held their opponents to single-digit scores on six occasions during the season, including five matches against teams that finished in the top eight. Following Billy Slater's shoulder surgery in Round 10, Cameron Munster played at fullback for the remainder of the season. Cameron Smith and Craig Bellamy reached the 300-game milestone for the club as player and coach, respectively. Mark Evans left his position as CEO, and Dave Donaghy assumed the role.

== Season summary ==
- Auckland Nines – The club competed in the second annual Auckland Nines competition over 31 January – 1 February. The Storm lost two of their three pool games thus not progressing to the final stage. Will Chambers captained the squad, with the team wearing sleeveless jerseys.
- February 7 – The Storm play Canberra in a preseason trial and go down 32–20 in very hot conditions.
- February 13 – Will Chambers and Jesse Bromwich represent Melbourne in the Annual All Star game.
- February 21 – The Storm complete their trial match period with a come from behind 32–30 win over Canterbury Bulldogs. The Storm added 24 points in the second half.
- Round 1 – The Storm commence the 2015 season with a win over St George Illawarra. Dale Finucane, Felise Kaufusi and Blake Green all make their playing debuts for the Storm. Ryan Hinchcliffe plays his 150th Game.
- Round 2 – Tom Learoyd-Lahrs makes his playing debut for the Storm.
- Round 4 – The Storm suffer their second loss of the season, during Golden Point extra time. The Storm lost the game after the Cowboys leveled the scores after being 17-10 down with 5 minutes remaining in normal time.
- Round 7 – A last-minute field goal from Cooper Cronk secures the club a 17–16 win over the Sydney Roosters in a high quality match played in heavy rain at AAMI Park.
- Round 8 – Nelson Asofa-Solomona makes his playing debut after being elevated from the NYC team.
- 1 May – Representative weekend – 15 Storm Players are chosen to represent the various teams over representative weekend
- Round 9 – Christian Welch makes his playing debut after being elevated from the NYC team. Billy Slater scores two tries on his return game following a shoulder injury. The tries take Slater's career total to 172, surpassing Ken Irvine's Australian record for most tries with a single first grade club. Melbourne equal their biggest win of the season thus far defeating the Eels by 18 points.
- Round 12 – The Storm suffer their worst loss of the season thus far losing to the Roosters by 22 points. The storm failed to score a try in the match.
- Round 13 – The Storm bounced back from the Round 12 loss with their biggest win of the season so far with a 20 nil win over the Panthers. Richard Kennar also makes his playing debut.
- Round 14 – The storm suffer a narrow loss against the Eels playing without their State of Origin representatives. Hymel Hunt plays his first game for the Storm since transferring from the Titans.
- Round 18 – The Storm suffer their fourth consecutive loss in a 28–14 loss to the Warriors.
- Round 19 – Cameron Smith joined an elite group in NRL circles as he lined up for his 300th Melbourne Storm and NRL Game becoming only the 24th player to achieve this. The game was also notable as it became the Storms biggest win for the season thus far (42 points) and also scored their highest total (52 points) thus far scoring 10 tries.
- Round 20 – The Storm will stage a home game in McLean Park in Napier New Zealand. Storm player Tohu Harris has designed the jersey for the game which takes in his New Zealand, Polynesian and Maori Heritage
- Round 21 – Cameron Smith sets another record as he captained Melbourne Storm for the 200th time against Wests Tigers. Mahe Fonua also played his 50th game.
- Round 22 – Cameron Munster scores a Hat-trick of tries as the Storm beat Gold Coast by 22 points
- Round 23 – Kevin Proctor plays his 150th NRL Game in the Storm's big win over Cronulla Sharks.
- Rounds 25 and 26 – The Storm complete the regular season with two hard fought wins over Cowboys and Broncos. Both teams also finished the season in the Top 4. The two wins mean the Storm finished the season in the Top 4.
- Finals Week 1 – The Storm defeat the 1st placed Sydney Roosters in an upset 20–18 to secure a week off and a Home Preliminary Final in Week 3.
- Finals Week 3 – The Storm suffer defeat in their home Preliminary Final against the North Queensland Cowboys ending their 2015 season one game short of the Grand Final. The game was also notable as the attendance of 29,315 spectators was officially the highest attendance so far at AAMI Park for a Storm game.

=== Milestone games ===
Round	Player	Milestone
Round 1	Dale Finucane	Storm debut
Round 1	Blake Green	Storm debut
Round 1	Felise Kaufusi	NRL debut
Round 1	Ryan Hinchcliffe	150th Storm game
Round 2	Tom Learoyd-Lahrs	Storm debut
Round 8	Nelson Asofa-Solomona	NRL debut
Round 9	Christian Welch	NRL debut
Round 13	Richard Kennar	NRL debut
Round 14	Hymel Hunt	Storm debut
Round 19	Cameron Smith	300th game
Round 21	Mahe Fonua	50th game
Round 23	Kevin Proctor	150th game

== Fixtures ==
=== Preseason ===
Date	Round	Opponent	Venue	Result	Score	Source
31 January	Auckland Nines Pool Game	North Queensland Cowboys	Eden Park, Auckland, New Zealand	Loss	8-17	
31 January	Auckland Nines Pool Game	Penrith Panthers	Eden Park, Auckland, New Zealand	Win	20-4	
1 February	Auckland Nines Pool Game	South Sydney Rabbitohs	Eden Park, Auckland, New Zealand	Loss	24-4	
7 February	Trial 1	Canberra Raiders	E.W. Moore Oval, Griffith, New South Wales	Loss	32-20	
14 February	Trial 2	Eastern Suburbs Tigers	Gosch's Paddock, Melbourne	Win	44-12	
21 February	Trial 3	Canterbury Bulldogs	AAMI Park, Melbourne	Win	32-30	

=== Regular season ===
==== Result by round ====
Round	1	2	3	4	5	6	7	8	9	10	11	12	13	14	15	16	17	18	19	20	21	22	23	24	25	26
Ground	A	A	H	A	H	A	H	H	A	H	–	A	A	H	H	A	–	A	H	N	A	H	A	H	H	A
Result	W	L	W	L	W	W	W	L	W	W	B	L	W	L	L	L	B	L	W	W	L	W	W	L	W	W
Position	5	8	4	7	5	2	1	3	2	1	1	4	3	4	5	6	5	6	5	5	6	6	5	6	5	4
Points	2	2	4	4	6	8	10	10	12	14	16	16	18	18	18	18	20	20	22	24	24	26	28	28	30	32

Source: Rugby League Tables
A = Away; H = Home; N = Neutral; B = Bye; W = Win; D = Draw; L = Loss

==== Matches ====
- FG - Field Goal
- GP - Golden Point extra time

Date	Round	Opponent	Venue	Result	Score	Tries	Goals/Field Goals	Report
9 March	1	St George-Illawarra Dragons	WIN Stadium, Wollongong	Win	4-12	Tonumaipea, Chambers	Smith 2/2	
14 March	2	Manly Sea Eagles	Brookvale Oval, Manly	Loss	24-22	Green (2), Tonumaipea, Chambers	Smith 3/4	
21 March	3	Cronulla Sharks	AAMI Park, Melbourne	Win	36-18	Harris (2), Cronk, Smith, Koroibete, Chambers	Smith 6/6	
30 March	4	North Queensland Cowboys	1300SMILES Stadium, Townsville	Loss	18-17 (GP)	Mann, Koroibete, Kaufusi	Smith 2/3, Cronk 1/2 (FG)	
6 April	5	New Zealand Warriors	AAMI Park, Melbourne	Win	30-14	Koroibete (2), Fonua, Glasby, Chambers	Smith 5/5	
12 April	6	Canberra Raiders	GIO Stadium, Canberra	Win	10-14	Fonua, Munster	Smith 3/3	
18 April	7	Sydney Roosters	AAMI Park, Melbourne	Win	17-16	Koroibete, Kaufusi, Chambers	Smith 2/3, Cronk 1/1 (FG)	
25 April	8	Manly Sea Eagles	AAMI Park, Melbourne	Loss	10-12	Koroibete, Cronk	Smith 1/2	
10 May	9	Parramatta Eels	Pirtek Stadium, Parramatta	Win	10-28	Slater (2), Koroibete, Chambers, Finucane	Smith 4/5	
16 May	10	South Sydney Rabbitohs	AAMI Park, Melbourne	Win	16-12	J Bromwich, Chambers	Smith 4/4	
24 May	11	Bye						
1 June	12	Sydney Roosters	Allianz Stadium, Sydney	Loss	24-2	-	Smith 1/1	
6 June	13	Penrith Panthers	Sportingbet Stadium, Penrith	Win	0-20	Green (2), Munster	Smith 4/4	
15 June	14	Parramatta Eels	AAMI Park, Melbourne	Loss	22-26	Harris, Hampton, Green, Hunt	Harris 3/4	
21 June	15	Brisbane Broncos	AAMI Park, Melbourne	Loss	12-14	Green (2)	Smith 2/2	
29 June	16	Canterbury Bulldogs	Belmore Sports Ground, Sydney	Loss	20-4	Koroibete	Smith 0/1	
6 July	17	Bye						
12 July	18	New Zealand Warriors	Mt Smart Stadium, Auckland	Loss	28-14	K Bromwich (2), Koroibete	Smith 1/3	
17 July	19	Penrith Panthers	AAMI Park, Melbourne	Win	52-10	Cronk (2), Proctor (2), Koroibete (2), Harris, Green, Fonua, Kennar	Smith 6/10	
25 July	20	St George Illawarra Dragons	McLean Park, Napier	Win	22-4	Asofa-Solomona, Koroibete, Proctor, Fonua	Smith 3/4	
31 July	21	Wests Tigers	Leichhardt Oval, Balmain	Loss	34-16	Koroibete (2), J Bromwich	Smith 2/3	
9 August	22	Gold Coast Titans	AAMI Park, Melbourne	Win	36-14	Munster (3), Duffle (2), Koroibete, Chambers	Smith 4/7	
17 August	23	Cronulla Sharks	Remondis Stadium, Cronulla	Win	2-30	Duffie (2), J Bromwich, Finucane, Munster	Smith 5/5	
24 August	24	Newcastle Knights	AAMI Park, Melbourne	Loss	6-20	Munster	Smith 1/1	
29 August	25	North Queensland Cowboys	AAMI Park, Melbourne	Win	14-6	K Bromwich, Chambers	Smith 2/2	
3 September	26	Brisbane Broncos	Suncorp Stadium, Brisbane	Win	8-15	Mann (2), Chambers	Smith 1/3, Cronk 1/1 (FG)	

=== Finals ===
Date	Round	Opponent	Venue	Result	Score	Tries	Goals/Field Goals	Report
11 September	1st Qualifying Final - Week 1	Sydney Roosters	Allianz Stadium, Sydney	Win	18-20	Koroibete, Mann, Glasby	Smith 4/4	
26 September	1st Preliminary Final - Week 3	North Queensland Cowboys	AAMI Park, Melbourne	Loss	12-32	Cronk, Harris	Smith 2/2	

=== Ladder ===
2015 NRL season
Pos	Team	Pld	W	D	L	B	PF	PA	PD	Pts
1	Sydney Roosters	24	18	0	6	2	591	300	+291	40
2	Brisbane Broncos	24	17	0	7	2	574	379	+195	38
3	North Queensland Cowboys (P)	24	17	0	7	2	587	454	+133	38
4	Melbourne Storm	24	14	0	10	2	467	348	+119	32
5	Canterbury-Bankstown Bulldogs	24	14	0	10	2	522	480	+42	32
6	Cronulla-Sutherland Sharks	24	14	0	10	2	469	476	−7	32
7	South Sydney Rabbitohs	24	13	0	11	2	465	467	−2	30
8	St. George Illawarra Dragons	24	12	0	12	2	435	408	+27	28
9	Manly-Warringah Sea Eagles	24	11	0	13	2	458	492	−34	26
10	Canberra Raiders	24	10	0	14	2	577	569	+8	24
11	Penrith Panthers	24	9	0	15	2	399	477	−78	22
12	Parramatta Eels	24	9	0	15	2	448	573	−125	22
13	New Zealand Warriors	24	9	0	15	2	445	588	−143	22
14	Gold Coast Titans	24	9	0	15	2	439	636	−197	22
15	Wests Tigers	24	8	0	16	2	487	562	−75	20
16	Newcastle Knights	24	8	0	16	2	458	612	−154	20

== 2015 Coaches ==
- Craig Bellamy -Head Coach
- Justin Morgan - Assistant Coach
- Anthony Seibold - Assistant Coach
- Nathan Brown -Coaching Consultant
- Tony Ayoub -Head Physiotherapist

== 2015 Squad ==
As of 20 June 2015

Cap (Note: Players are listed with the cap number as they appear on the Melbourne Storm honour board. Additional squad members do not have a cap number.)	Nat.	Player name	Position	First Storm Game	Previous First Grade RL club (Note: This column denotes the previous RL club the player was signed to and played first grade RL for. If they are yet to debut then this is stipulated. If they were merely signed to the club but did not play then it is not counted.)
55	(Australia)	Cameron Smith (c)	HK	2002	(Australia) Melbourne Storm
58	(Australia)	Billy Slater	FB	2003	(Australia) Melbourne Storm
73	(Australia)	Cooper Cronk	HB	2004	(Australia) Melbourne Storm
97	(Australia)	Will Chambers	CE	2007	(Australia) Queensland Reds
105	(New Zealand)	Kevin Proctor	SR	2008	(Australia) Melbourne Storm
110	(Australia)	Ryan Hinchcliffe	HK	2009	(Australia) Canberra Raiders
119	(New Zealand)	Jesse Bromwich	PR	2010	(Australia) Melbourne Storm
124	(New Zealand)	Matt Duffie	WG, CE, FB	2010	(Australia) Melbourne Storm
143	(Tonga)	Mahe Fonua	CE, WG	2012	(Australia) Melbourne Storm
144	(New Zealand)	Tohu Harris	SR, LK, FE	2013	(Australia) Melbourne Storm
147	(New Zealand)	Slade Griffen	HK, LK	2013	(Australia) Melbourne Storm
149	(New Zealand)	Kenny Bromwich	PR, SR, LK	2013	(Australia) Melbourne Storm
150	(Australia)	Jordan McLean	PR	2013	(Australia) Melbourne Storm
152	(Australia)	Ben Hampton	FE, HB, FB	2013	(Australia) Melbourne Storm
153	(Australia)	Tim Glasby	PR, SR	2013	(Australia) Melbourne Storm
154	(Samoa)	Young Tonumaipea	WG, FB	2014	(Australia) Melbourne Storm
157	(Australia)	Dayne Weston	PR, SR	2014	(Australia) Penrith Panthers
158	(Australia)	Kurt Mann	FE, FB, HB, CE	2014	(Australia) Melbourne Storm
159	(Australia)	Joel Romelo	FE, HK, HB, LK	2014	(Australia) Canterbury-Bankstown Bulldogs
160	(Australia)	Cameron Munster	FE, FB, HB, HK	2014	(Australia) Melbourne Storm
161	(Fiji)	Marika Koroibete	WG	2014	(Australia) Wests Tigers
162	(Australia)	Blake Green	FE, HB	2015	(England) Wigan Warriors
163	(Australia)	Dale Finucane	PR, SR, LK	2015	(Australia) Canterbury Bulldogs
164	(Tonga)	Felise Kaufusi	PR	2015	(Australia) North Queensland Cowboys
165	(Australia)	Tom Learoyd-Lahrs	PR, SR	2015	(Australia) Canberra Raiders
166	(New Zealand)	Nelson Asofa-Solomona	SR, PR	2015	(Australia) Melbourne Storm
167	(Australia)	Christian Welch	SR, PR	2015	(Australia) Melbourne Storm
168	(Samoa)	Richard Kennar	WG	2015	(Australia) Melbourne Storm
169	(New Zealand)	Hymel Hunt	CE, WG	2015	(Australia) Gold Coast Titans
	(Lebanon)	Travis Robinson	WG, CE, FB	Yet to Debut	(Australia) Penrith Panthers
	(Australia)	Dean Britt	SR	Yet to Debut	(Australia) Melbourne Storm
	(Australia)	Billy Brittain	HK	Yet to Debut	(Australia) Melbourne Storm
	(Australia)	Shaun Nona	FE	Yet to Debut	(Australia) Northern Pride
	(Cook Islands)	Charnze Nicoll-Klokstad	CE, WG, SR, LK, FB	Yet to Debut	(Australia) Melbourne Storm
	(Cook Islands)	Aaron Teroi	HK, HB	Yet to Debut	(Australia) Melbourne Storm

== Player movements ==
Source NRL.com:

Losses

- Mitch Garbutt to Brisbane Broncos
- Rhys Kennedy to Canberra Raiders
- Ryan Hoffman to New Zealand Warriors
- Matthew Lodge to Wests Tigers
- Junior Moors to Castleford Tigers
- Bryan Norrie to Retirement
- Justin O'Neill to North Queensland Cowboys
- Ben Roberts to Castleford Tigers
- George Rose to St George Illawarra Dragons
- Cody Walker to South Sydney Rabbitohs
- Sisa Waqa to Canberra Raiders

Gains

- Dale Finucane from Canterbury Bulldogs
- Blake Green from Wigan Warriors
- Tom Learoyd-Lahrs from Canberra Raiders
- Shaun Nona from Northern Pride

== Representative honours ==
The following players played representative matches in 2015. (C) = Captain

	2015 All Stars match	City Vs Country	Rugby League internationals ANZAC Test - AUS vs NZL Pacific Tests - FIJ vs PNG and SAM vs TGA	State Of Origin 1	State Of Origin 2	State of Origin 3	Kiwis Tour
Jesse Bromwich	NRL All Stars	-	New Zealand	-	-	-	New Zealand
Will Chambers	Indigenous All Stars	-	Australia	Queensland	Queensland	Queensland	-
Ryan Hinchcliffe	-	Country	-	-	-	-	-
Dale Finucane	-	Country	-	-	-	-	-
Cameron Smith	-	-	Australia (C)	Queensland (C)	Queensland (C)	Queensland (C)	-
Cooper Cronk	-	-	Australia	Queensland	-	Queensland	-
Kevin Proctor	-	-	New Zealand	-	-	-	New Zealand
Tohu Harris	-	-	New Zealand	-	-	-	New Zealand
Marika Koroibete	-	-	Fiji	-	-	-	-
Mahe Fonua	-	-	Tonga	-	-	-	-
Felise Kaufusi	-	-	Tonga	-	-	-	-
Billy Slater	-	-	-	Queensland	Queensland	-	-

== Statistics ==
Statistics Source: Current as of the end of the 2015 NRL season.

Name	App	T	G	FG	Pts	Goal%
Nelson Asofa-Solomona	12	1	0	0	4	
Jesse Bromwich	26	3	0	0	12	
Kenny Bromwich	18	3	0	0	12	
Will Chambers	25	10	0	0	40	
Cooper Cronk	23	5	0	3	23	
Matt Duffie	9	4	0	0	16	
Dale Finucane	23	2	0	0	8	
Mahe Fonua	13	4	0	0	16	
Tim Glasby	26	2	0	0	8	
Blake Green	26	8	0	0	32	
Ben Hampton	3	1	0	0	4	
Tohu Harris	26	5	3	0	26	75.00% (3/4)
Ryan Hinchcliffe	26	0	0	0	0	
Hymel Hunt	3	1	0	0	4	
Felise Kaufusi	17	2	0	0	8	
Richard Kennar	6	1	0	0	4	
Marika Koroibete	23	16	0	0	64	
Tom Learoyd-Lahrs	1	0	0	0	0	
Kurt Mann	20	4	0	0	16	
Jordan McLean	15	0	0	0	0	
Cameron Munster	19	7	0	0	28	
Kevin Proctor	26	3	0	0	12	
Billy Slater	7	2	0	0	8	
Cameron Smith	25	1	71	0	146	78.89% (71/90)
Young Tonumaipea	4	2	0	0	8	
Christian Welch	10	0	0	0	0	
Dayne Weston	10	0	0	0	0	
27 Players used		87	74	3	499	78.72% (74/94)

Most Points in a Game: 16

- Cameron Smith (1 Try, 6 Goals) vs Cronulla Sharks (Round 3)

Most tries in a Game: 3

- Cameron Munster vs Gold Coast Titans (Round 22)

Highest score in a winning game: 52 points

- vs Penrith Panthers (Round 19)

Lowest score in a winning game: 12 points

- vs St George Illawarra Dragons (Round 1)

Greatest winning margin: 42 points

- vs Penrith Panthers (Round 19)

Highest score in a losing game: 22 points

- vs Manly Sea Eagles (Round 2)
- vs Parramatta Eels (Round 14)

Lowest score in a losing game: 2 points

- vs Sydney Roosters (Round 12)

Greatest losing margin: 22 points

- vs Sydney Roosters (Round 12)

Greatest number of Games won consecutively: 3

- Between Rounds 5 and 7

Greatest number of Games lost consecutively: 4

- Between Rounds 14 and 18

== Jersey ==
In 2015 the Storm jerseys were manufactured by BLK and new jerseys were designed for 2015. The home Jersey was predominantly navy blue with Purple across the shoulders and a Silver strip running horizontally across the chest. The Away Jersey Features a White design with purple hoops down the jersey. The Storm also broke new ground for Rugby League featuring an AFL style sleeveless jersey for the Auckland Nines.

== Awards ==
=== Melbourne Storm Awards Night ===
Held at Docklands, Melbourne on Wednesday 7 October 2015.

- Melbourne Storm Player of the Year: Jesse Bromwich
- Melbourne Storm Rookie of the Year: Cameron Munster
- Suzuki Members' Player of the Year: Cooper Cronk & Jesse Bromwich
- Melbourne Storm Most Improved: Tim Glasby
- Melbourne Storm Best Forward: Cameron Smith
- Melbourne Storm Best Back:Cameron Munster
- Best Try: Marika Koroibete, Round 19 vs Panthers
- Feeder Club Player of the Year Award:
- Darren Bell U20s Player of the Year Award: Latrell Robinson
- U20s Best Forward: Joe Stimson
- U20s Best Back: Jake Turpin
- Greg Brentnall Young Achievers Award: Aaron Teroi
- Mick Moore Club Person of the Year: Dan Di Pasqua
- Chairman's Award: Danielle Smith (Chief Financial Officer)
- Life Member Inductees: Ryan Hinchcliffe & Julie Cliff

=== RLPA Awards Night ===
- RLPA Rookie of the Year: Cameron Munster
- RLPA Wellbeing and Education Club of the Year: Brian Phelan, Andrew Blowers & Peter Robinson

=== Additional Awards ===
- QRL Ron McAuliffe Medal: Cameron Smith
