= Xavier Coates =

Australia & PNG international rugby league footballer

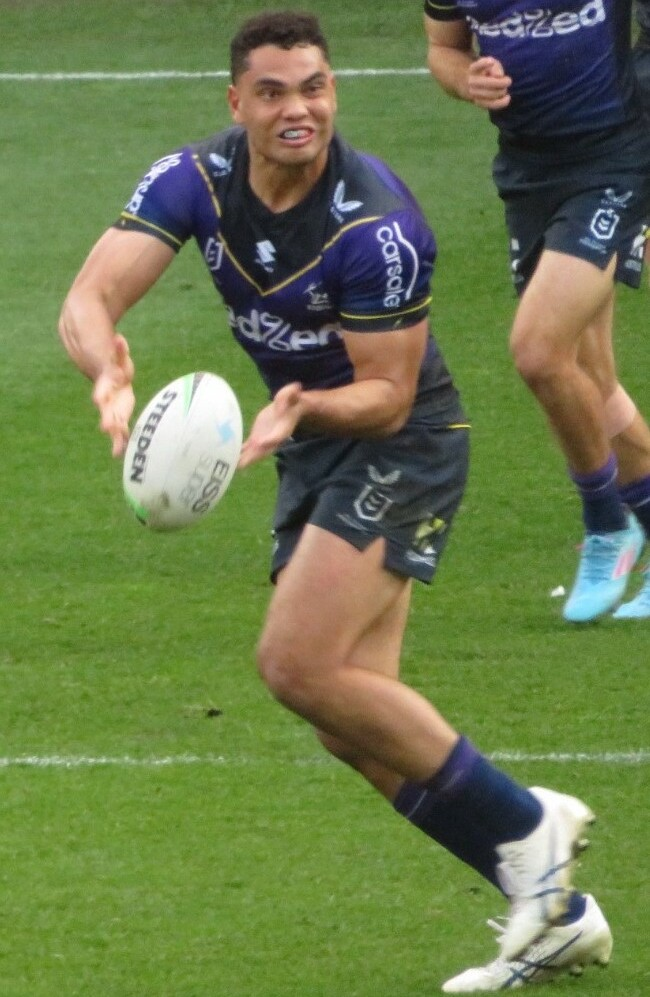

Personal information
- Born: 12 March 2001 (age 25) Port Moresby, Papua New Guinea
- Height: 194 cm (6 ft 4 in)
- Weight: 108 kg (17 st 0 lb)

Playing information
- Position: Wing
Club
| Years | Team | Pld | T | G | FG | P |
|---|---|---|---|---|---|---|
| 2019–21 | Brisbane Broncos | 32 | 17 | 0 | 0 | 68 |
| 2022– | Melbourne Storm | 76 | 62 | 0 | 0 | 248 |
| | Total | 108 | 79 | 0 | 0 | 316 |
Representative
| Years | Team | Pld | T | G | FG | P |
| 2019 | Papua New Guinea | 1 | 0 | 0 | 0 | 0 |
| 2020–25 | Queensland | 13 | 6 | 0 | 0 | 24 |
| 2024 | Australia | 3 | 1 | 0 | 0 | 4 |
- Source: As of 5 October 2025

Xavier Coates (born 12 March 2001) is a professional rugby league footballer who plays as a winger for the Melbourne Storm in the National Rugby League. He has represented Australia and Papua New Guinea at international level.

He previously played for the Brisbane Broncos. He has played for Queensland in the State of Origin series.

== Early life ==
Coates was born in Port Moresby, Papua New Guinea to a mother from the Gulf Province in PNG and an Australian father. As an infant he moved with his family to Australia and initially spent two years living in Cairns before settling on the Gold Coast.

He attended Marymount College throughout his upbringing and began pursuing an athletics career in primary school. His goal was to represent Papua New Guinea at the Olympics but former NRL player and Marymount teacher Matt Geyer organised a phone call with then-Queensland captain Greg Inglis and the pair convinced Coates to pursue a career in rugby league instead. Coates named Inglis as his sporting idol growing up and was nicknamed 'Little GI' by his Broncos teammates due to the similarities in playing style.

== Junior career ==
Xavier Coates began playing junior football on the Gold Coast for the Currumbin Eagles in 2010 at the age of 9 years old. Coates never made an underage representative team as a junior, being overlooked on multiple occasions. After a brief pursuit of an athletics career, he returned to the field and played part in the Currumbin Eagles' undefeated premiership winning Under-16 team in 2017.

After being signed to the Bronco's Coates was invited to the Broncos' summer camp where he impressed coaches and trainers and was selected in the 2018 Queensland emerging Under-18 Origin Squad despite being 16 years old and never having played a representative game. Coates was selected in the 2018 Queensland Under-18 State of Origin side who went down to NSW 16–10.

In 2018, he was instrumental in the Currumbin Eagles' U17 Premiership where he was coached by former Melbourne Storm player Matt Geyer. He also featured in the Mal Meninga Cup with the Tweed Heads Seagulls. In 2019 he was fast tracked to senior rugby league with the Currumbin Eagles, making his Queensland Cup debut for the Tweed Heads Seagulls, however as he was not a contracted Gold Coast Titans player, he was transferred to Broncos' feeder club Redcliffe Dolphins.

Coates was selected in junior representative teams (Under-18 South Coast) and the Under-18 Queensland Schoolboys squad and once again was selected in the Queensland emerging Under-18 Origin Squad and played in the junior State of Origin match against NSW, where Queensland won the game 34–12, with Coates named player of the match.

== Senior career ==
=== 2019–2021: Brisbane Broncos ===
Coates made his international debut for Papua New Guinea in their 24–6 defeat by Samoa in the 2019 Oceania Cup. A month later, in round 16 of the 2019 NRL season he made his NRL debut for the Brisbane Broncos against the Cronulla-Sutherland Sharks, scoring a try.

He made 12 appearances for Brisbane in the 2020 NRL season, a year which saw Brisbane come last for the first time their history. Coates achieved the highest top speed of a player in the 2020 NRL season by hitting a top speed of 36.9 km/h against the Newcastle Knights in round 6 of the 2020 season.

Coates was selected to make his debut for Queensland on the wing in game one of the 2020 State of Origin series, scoring a try in the 18–14 win. Coates then played game two scoring the first try in a 34–10 loss, however was ruled out of game three due to a groin injury suffered in the captain's run before the match.

In round 1 of the 2021 NRL season, he scored two tries for Brisbane in the first half of the match against Parramatta. In the act of scoring the second try, Coates landed awkwardly on his neck and was taken from the field. Brisbane would go on to lose the match 24–16.

In round 3 of the 2021 NRL season, he scored two tries in a 24–0 victory over Canterbury-Bankstown. On 9 May 2021, Coates announced that he had signed a two-year deal to join Melbourne Storm for the 2022 and 2023 seasons.

In round 23 of the 2021 NRL season, he scored two tries in a 24–22 victory over the New Zealand Warriors.

=== 2022–present: Melbourne Storm ===
In round 1 of the 2022 NRL season, Coates made his club debut for Melbourne on his 21st birthday against Wests Tigers, scoring a try in a win at CommBank Stadium. He had his club debut jersey (cap number 217) presented to him by former Melbourne player Matt Geyer. In round 7, Coates scored four tries for Melbourne in a 70–10 victory over the New Zealand Warriors. In the 2022 elimination final, Coates scored a hat-trick in Melbourne's 28–20 loss against Canberra.

Coates would finish the 2022 season with 16 tries from 17 appearances for Melbourne, with an ankle injury suffered in game one of the 2022 State of Origin series sidelining the winger for seven matches. In round 6 of the 2023 NRL season, Coates scored a hat-trick in Melbourne's 28–8 victory over the Sydney Roosters. Coates played 21 games for Melbourne in the 2023 NRL season and scored 16 tries as the club finished third on the table. He played in the qualifying final defeat against Brisbane but was injured in the game and later ruled out for the remainder of the season.

Following his consistent 2023 season, Coates would be awarded the Melbourne Storm's Cameron Smith Player of the Year award as the club's best for the season. In round 8 of the 2024 NRL season, Coates scored a hat-trick in Melbourne's 54–20 victory over South Sydney. Coates was later taken from the field with a hamstring injury and ruled out for an extended period. Coates played a total of 16 matches for Melbourne in the 2024 NRL season as the club were runaway minor premiers. Coates played in Melbourne's 2024 NRL Grand Final loss against Penrith. In round 11 of the 2025 NRL season, Coates scored a hat-trick in Melbourne's 31-26 loss against Cronulla.

On 6 September 2025, the Melbourne club announced that Coates re-signed with the club until the end of 2027. Coates played 22 games for Melbourne in the 2025 NRL season including their 26-22 2025 NRL Grand Final loss against Brisbane.

On 20 February 2026, Coates was ruled out for three months after requiring surgery on his Achilles. On 5 June, the Melbourne outfit announced Coates suffered a full rupture of his Achilles during training and would be ruled out for the rest of the year.

== Statistics ==
=== NRL ===
| Year | Team | Games | Tries | Pts |
|---|---|---|---|---|
| 2019 | Brisbane Broncos | 3 | 1 | 4 |
| 2020 | Brisbane Broncos | 12 | 5 | 20 |
| 2021 | Brisbane Broncos | 17 | 11 | 44 |
| 2022 | Melbourne Storm | 17 | 16 | 64 |
| 2023 | Melbourne Storm | 21 | 16 | 64 |
| 2024 | Melbourne Storm | 16 | 10 | 40 |
| 2025 | Melbourne Storm | 22 | 20 | 80 |
| | Totals | 108 | 79 | 316 |

*

== Honours ==
Club

- NRL Minor Premiers: 2024

Individual

- Melbourne Storm Cameron Smith Player of the Year Award: 2023, 2025
- Dally M Try of the Year: 2024
- Peter Frilingos Headline Moment: 2024
- Melbourne Storm Best Try: 2024
