= Honda Australia =

Automobile manufacturer

Honda Australia Pty Ltd
- Type: Subsidiary
- Industry: Automotive
- Founded: 1969
- Headquarters: Moonee Ponds, Victoria, Australia
- Area served: Australia
- Key people: Jay Joseph (president & CEO)
- Products: Automobiles; Motorcycles; Outboard motors
- Parent: Honda
- Website: honda.com.au

Honda Australia Pty Ltd, commonly known as Honda Australia, is an Australian wholly owned subsidiary of Honda.

== History ==
Honda arrived in Australia in the mid 1950s, when independent firms imported Honda motorcycles. By the 1960s, motorcycles were joined by Honda vehicles, notably the tiny Honda S600 sports car and Honda N360 and later the Accord and Civic.

In the late 1960s, Honda decided on a national approach to motor vehicle sales. On 4 February 1969, Japanese Manager Hidehiko Shiomi set up Honda Australia. It was the first Honda subsidiary in the world set up primarily to sell cars. By 1987, all of the private distributors of Honda motorcycles and power equipment had relinquished distribution rights and Honda Australia became sole importer of all Honda products.

In 1991, motorcycles and power equipment were relocated to Campbellfield to become Honda MPE, while Honda Motor Vehicles remained at Tullamarine.

In recent years Honda Australia has supported motorsport teams such as Wall Racing in TCR Australia. It also supported Jenson Button in his FWD lap record attempt at Mount Panorama.

== Models ==
=== Current models ===
As of 24 December 2025

- Honda Civic
- Honda Civic Type R
- Honda Accord
- Honda HR-V
- Honda ZR-V
- Honda CR-V

=== Former models ===
- Honda CR-X (1987–1991)
- Honda Integra (1986–2006)
- Honda S2000 (1999–2009)
- Honda Insight (2001–2004, 2010–2014)
- Honda Legend (1986–2004, 2006–2014)
- Honda CR-Z (2011–2015)
- Honda City (2009–2020)
- Honda NSX (1991–2004, 2016–2020)
- Honda Jazz (2002–2021)
- Honda Odyssey (1995–2022)

== Sales ==
Launching within Australia in 1969, Honda has been a mainstay within Top 10 selling brands. In the 1990s, Honda established itself as quickly growing brand, and, within the 2000s, Honda Australia excelled itself, reaching 50,000 units between 2006 and 2008, and again in 2018, gaining it a higher position on the top selling brands charts. Throughout its establishment, Civic, and later CR-V and Accord Euro, nameplates have been very popular with Australian buyers, with each selling over 400,000, 125,000 and 60,000 vehicles (respectively) throughout their tenancy.

== Awards ==
Wheels Car Of The Year

- Honda Accord – 1977
- Honda Prelude – 1987
- Honda NSX – 1991
- Honda Odyssey – 1995
- Honda Accord Euro – 2009
- Honda CR-Z – 2011

Drive Car Of The Year

- Honda Odyssey – Best People Mover 2004, 2005, 2006, 2009, 2010, 2011, 2012
- Honda Accord Euro – Best Medium Car 2006
- Honda Civic – Interior design 2006
- Honda Accord V6 – Car of the Year 2008

Australia's Best Cars

- Honda Odyssey – Best People Mover 2004, 2005, 2006, 2007
- Honda S2000 – Best Sports Car 2000
- Honda Accord V6 – Best Luxury Car under $57,000 in 2003, 2004
- Honda Civic – Best Mid Size Car under $28,000 in 2006, 2007

NRMA

- Honda Integra – Best Sports Car under $47,116 in 1993
- Honda Integra – Best Sports Car under $50,000 in 1994
- Honda Odyssey – Best Family Wagon 1996, 1997, Best Passenger Wagon 1997, 1998
- Honda Civic – Best Small Medium Car

RACV

- Honda Odyssey – Best Passenger Van 1995, 1996, 1997, Best People Mover 1995, 1998
- Honda Prelude – Best Sports Car under $50,000 in 1994
- Honda S2000 – Best Sports Car over $56,000 in 1999

RAA

- Honda Odyssey – Car of the year 1995

RACQ

- Honda S2000 – Best Sports Car 1999

Carsales

- Honda Accord Euro – Prestige Car of the Year 2003, 2004, 2005
- Honda Jazz – Small car of the Year 2003

Wheels and Which Car Annual Quality Ratings

- Honda Accord – 1994, 1995

Peoples Car of Australia Award

- Honda Civic – 1991

Australian International Design Award

- Honda CR-Z – 2012
- Honda Civic Type R – 2008

Motor Performance Car Of The Year

- Honda Civic Type R – 2018
