= Grill'd =

Australian multinational casual dining restaurant chain

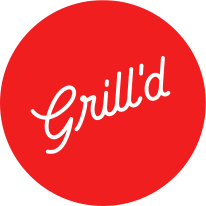

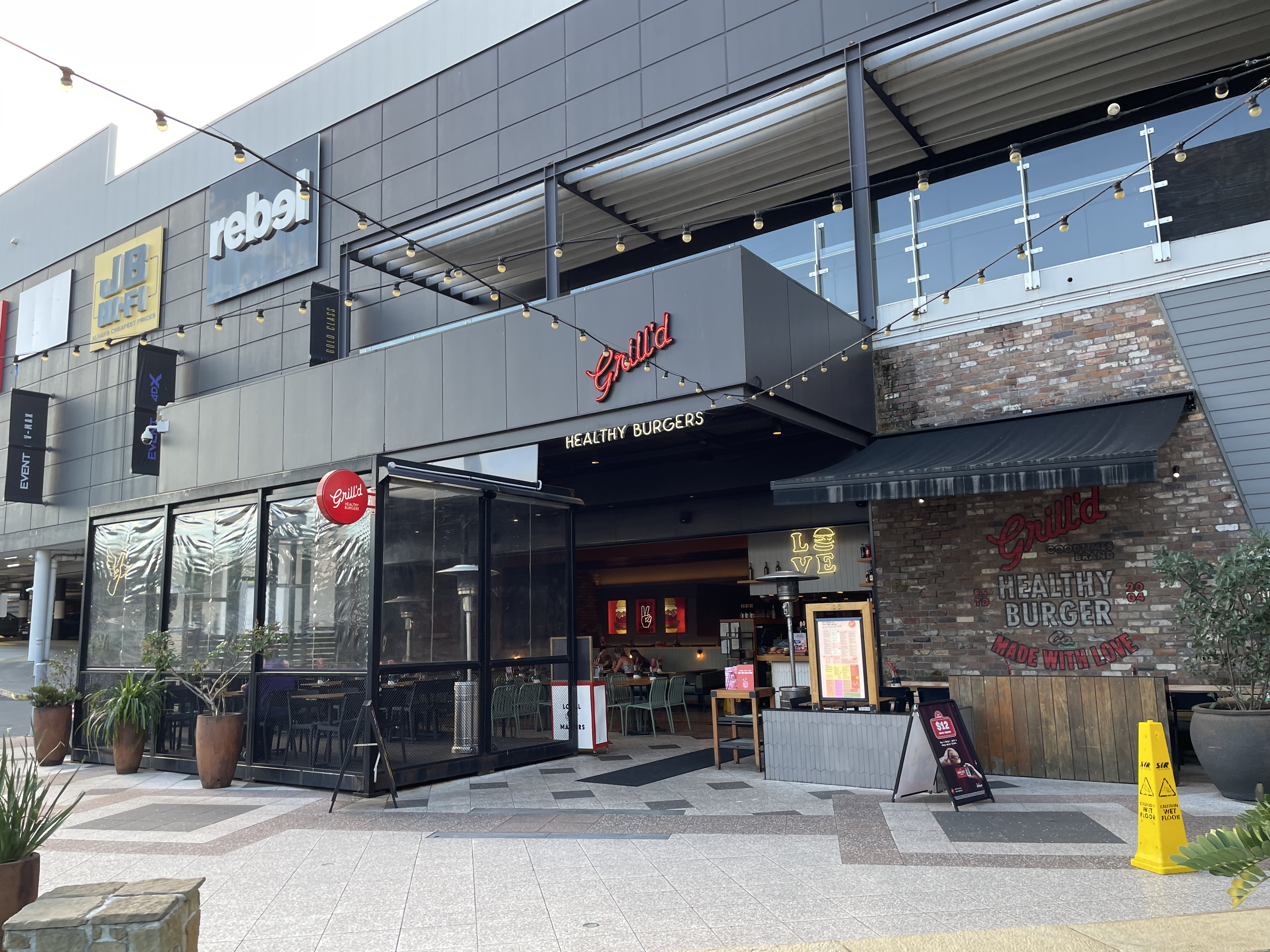
- Grill'd restaurant at Westfield Chermside
- Type: Private with subsidiary and franchise locations
- Industry: Restaurant
- Founded: 2 March 2004; 22 years ago
- Headquarters: Melbourne, Victoria, Australia
- Number of locations: 182 (2026)
- Products: Burgers; Fried chicken; Chips; Plant-based; Alcoholic beverages; Soft drinks
- Owner: Simon Crowe
- Number of employees: 4,500+
- Website: grilld.com.au

Grill'd is an Australian restaurant chain specialising in hamburgers, founded in 2004 by Simon Crowe in Hawthorn, Melbourne. The company operates 172 locations across Australia and one international location in Seminyak, Bali, operating primarily as a company-owned business with some franchised locations.

The chain markets itself as a healthier alternative to traditional fast food, using grass-fed and free range beef and lamb since 2010, and RSPCA-approved chicken since 2016. Grill'd has expanded its menu to include plant-based alternatives and fried chicken products, while implementing community engagement programs such as its Local Matters initiative.

The company has faced controversies over labour practices, including allegations of underpaying staff through trainee programs and disputes over working conditions, resulting in legal action and industrial disputes. As of June 2026, the company is being taken to court by the Australian Competition & Consumer Commission for allegedly greenwashing and misrepresenting donations as part of a promotion.

== History ==
The chain was founded in 2004 by Simon Crowe, who was inspired by the "engaging service ethic" he had seen in the US city of Milwaukee while working for the brewing company Foster's.

Since 2010, all lamb and beef sold by Grill'd has been grass-fed and free range, and then by 2016, all chicken sold has been RSPCA approved.

In December 2019, Grill'd opened its first international restaurant in Seminyak, Bali, Indonesia.

In November 2021, the chain began offering a plant-based burger called the Impossible Burger.

In May 2023, Grill'd opened a halal-certified restaurant in Blacktown, New South Wales. The restaurant served meat that was sourced from halal-certified suppliers, removed bacon from products, and did not serve alcohol. As of May 2024, the Blacktown Grill'd was no longer the only halal Grill'd location, with Grill'd now providing halal meat (excluding bacon) to all locations without restaurant-level certification. This means that while the meat is halal, the preparation of an individual restaurants might not meet halal standards.

In June 2023, the chain opened its first drive-through restaurant in Mount Ommaney, Queensland.

In August 2024, a second drive-through restaurant was opened in Chadstone, Victoria.

== Products ==
=== Burgers ===
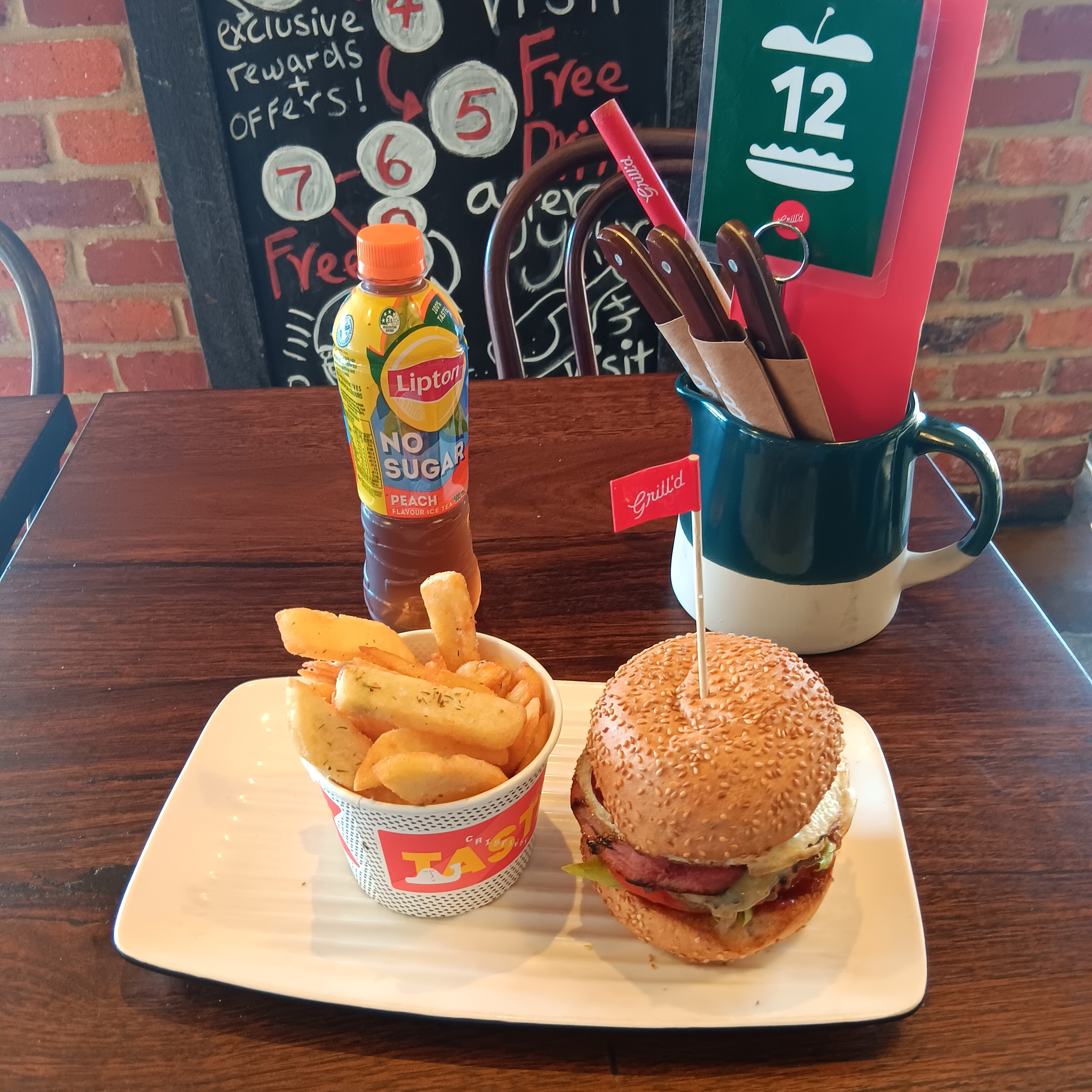
A Wild Wild West burger meal served at Grill'd Applecross, WA

Since opening in 2004, Grill'd has been serving a variety of burger types, ranging from seasonal items to sliders. They also offer a selection of burgers based on a range of dietary requirements, with specific menus outlined for those who are vegetarian or vegan.

=== Healthy Fried Chicken ===
In 2020, Grill'd launched "Healthy Fried Chicken" with "HFC Bites" in a campaign targeted at fast food chain KFC, offering all KFC employees free HFC Bites when they visit a Grill'd store in their uniform. Following this release, in 2021, Grill'd expanded its fried chicken line with HFC Burgers and publicly released its "No Secrets" recipe for its Healthy Fried Chicken. In 2025, Grill'd Healthy Fried Chicken Bites were voted Australia's favourite chicken nugget based on a blind taste test conducted by The Lab in February 2025 on QSR customers comparing Hungry Jack's, McDonald's, KFC and Grill'd. In August 2025, Grill'd expanded its fried chicken line with "HFC tenders", featuring larger chicken pieces, a double crunch coating and included a choice of one of their new deluxe dips. The Healthy Fried Chicken range is gluten free across the bites, tenders and burgers.

=== Meat alternatives ===
On 15 April 2019, Grill'd hosted the "24 Hour Meat Cheat", serving only meat-free options to launch the Beyond Meat Burgers into its menu such as the vegan burger "Vegan Garden Goodness" or the Vegetarian "Beyond Simply Grill'd". In July 2021, Grill'd, which is in collaboration with the company Fable and British chef Heston Blumenthal, created three new plant-based burgers with patties from mushroom-based protein.

=== Supermarket range ===
In August 2025, Grill'd launched a retail range of burger patties in Coles supermarkets. In May 2026, Grill'd expanded the range with seven sauces.

== Marketing ==
=== Special products ===
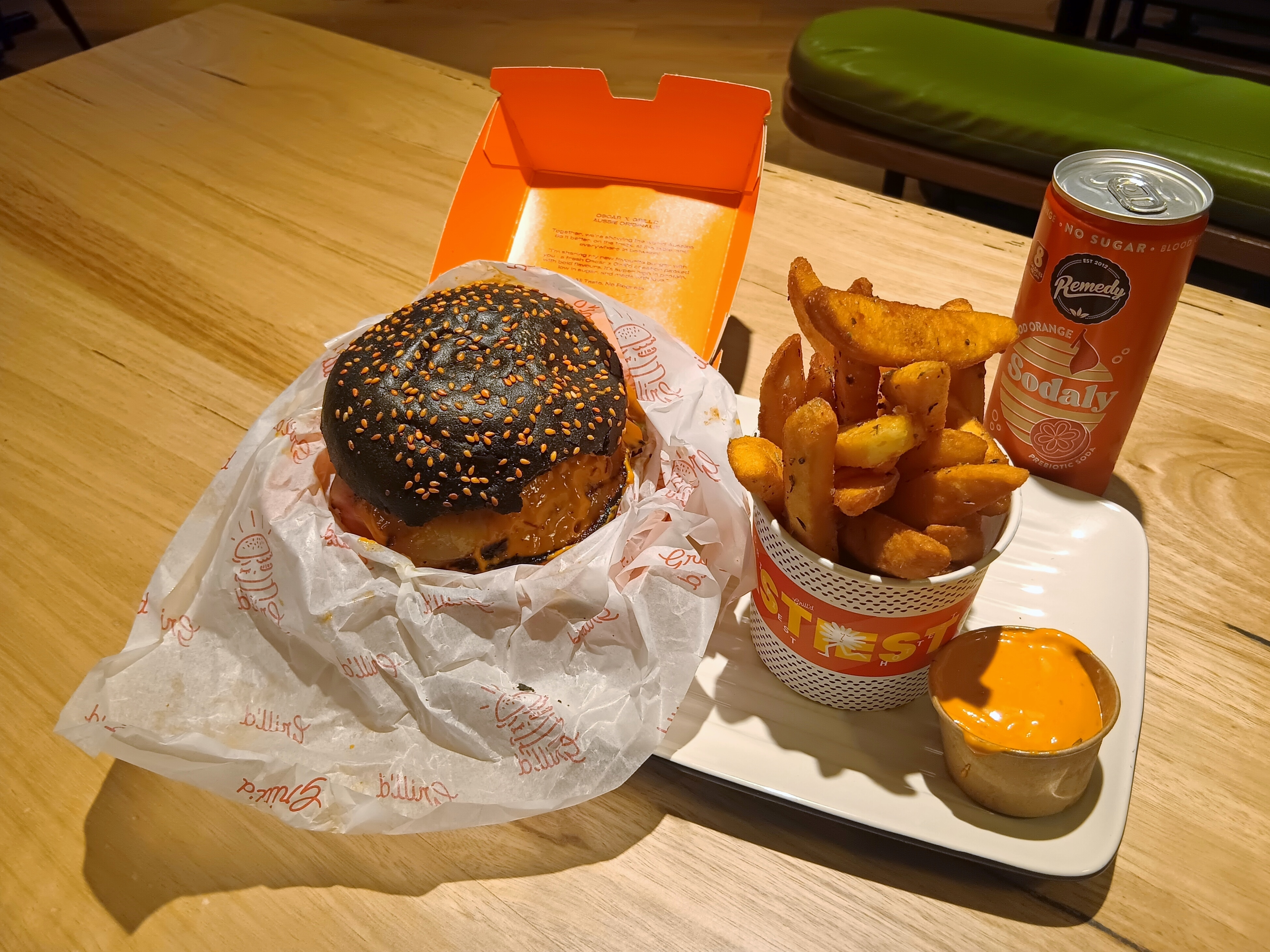
An Oscar Piastri Pack served at Grill'd Carousel, WA

In March 2017, Grill'd launched a "Bunny Burger" with a rabbit patty to celebrate Easter and sold a vegan version of the burger in 2018. The 2017 iteration caused controversy on Facebook.

In April 2021, Grill'd partnered with streaming service Binge to launch season 10 of The Walking Dead with a limited-edition burger available in each state of Australia. The campaign was shortlisted in the Mumbrella CommsCon Awards for Best Use of Owned Media.

In July 2023, Grill'd launched a burger with a pink bun alongside the release of the Barbie movie called the "Barbie Dreamburger."

In February 2025, Grill'd launched a burger co-designed with Formula One driver Oscar Piastri.

=== Partnerships and sponsorships ===
Grill'd has partnered with the Melbourne Storm NRL club since 2020. To commemorate the partnership, Grill'd created a "Storm Burger" in 2021. During the 2023 finals season, Grill'd released another iteration of the "Storm Burger" with a purple bun and a limited-time free offer at one of its Melbourne stores.

Grill'd has also been a partner of the Melbourne Boomers since the 2020 season, with their General Manager, Christy Collier-Hill stating that the franchise was "[very] excited to welcome Grill'd as a team sponsor for WNBL Season 2020" and eager to start "a very healthy, long-term partnership."

In 2022, Grill'd announced a four-year sponsorship of the Australian Institute of Sport. The 2022 Winter Olympics gold-medalist Jakara Anthony was chosen to be a Grill'd ambassador for the sponsorship.

In January 2024, Grill'd collaborated with former tennis player Ash Barty, Grill'd stated that the chain would donate $100 thousand to the Ash Barty Foundation to help young tennis players.

In April 2024, Grill'd announced a partnership with Australian Commonwealth Games gold-medalist Harry Garside.

In January 2025, the Australian rules football team, the Melbourne Demons, announced Grill'd as a new major partner.

=== Community involvement ===
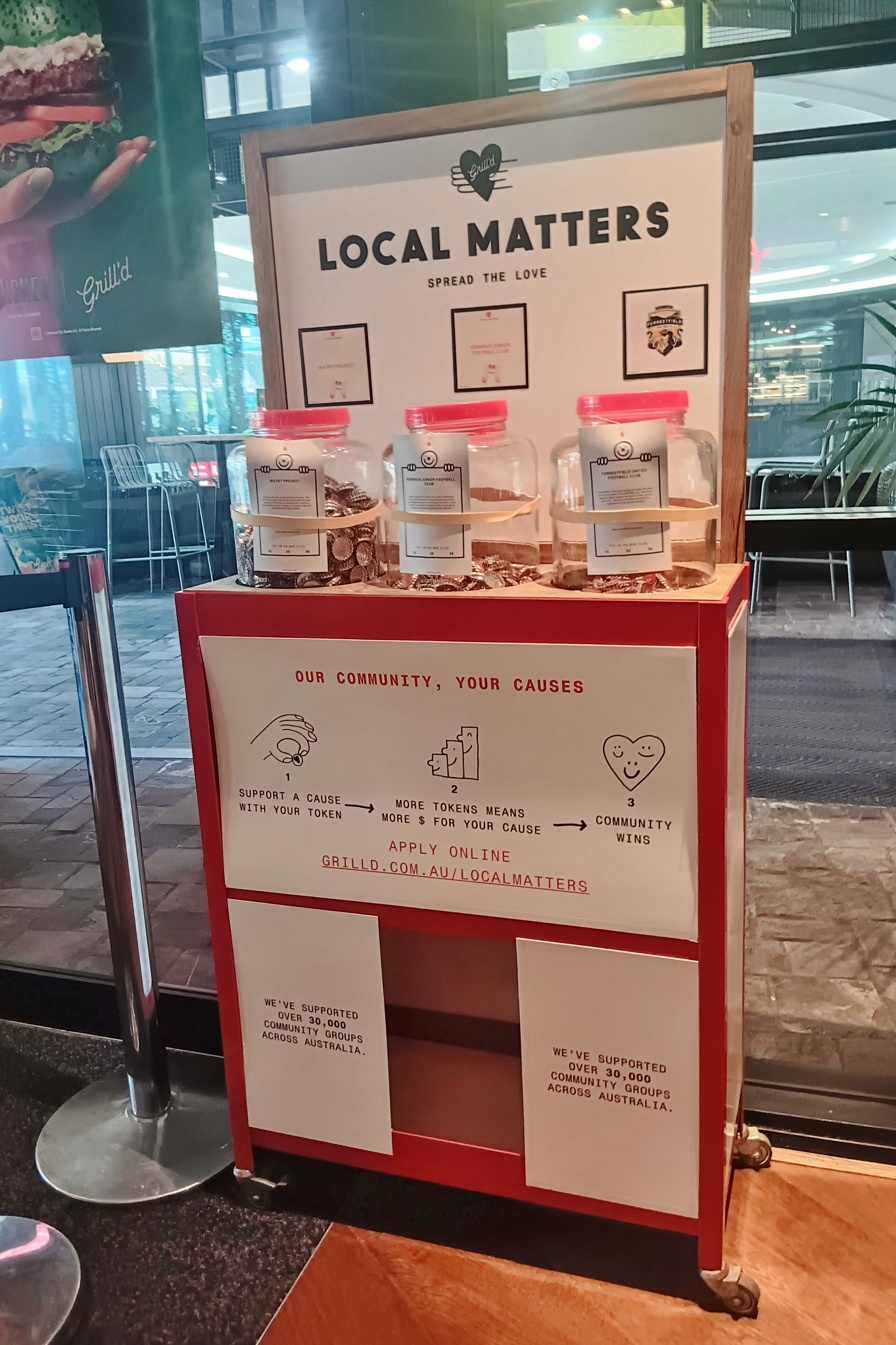
A Local Matters stand at Grill'd Carousel, WA

In 2011, Grill'd created the Local Matters program, which supports local community groups through monthly donations. Local community groups such as charities, school groups, and sporting teams in each restaurant's area apply to the store to take part, with three groups being selected monthly. Grill'd customers are given a bottle cap with each purchase, which is placed in a jar corresponding to each group. Whichever group receives the most caps at the end of the month receives $300, and the others receive $100.

They also participated in the Polished Man Campaign in 2016, which raises funds for programs aimed at ending violence against children. People who took part in the campaign by polishing a fingernail were able to receive free burgers from the chain during the event.

During the 2019–20 Australian bushfire disaster, Grill'd matched every ace Nick Kyrgios served in the 2020 Australian Open with a $200 donation to bushfire relief, totalling $20,000. In February 2020, Grill'd donated $2 for every burger a Relish Member bought, and another $2 for every new member signed up, raising a total of $236,302.

=== Sustainability ===
In 2021, Grill'd partnered with nonprofit environmental organisation, Greenfleet, as part of the company's Tree Day Tuesday initiative.

Grill'd was put as one of Australia's top 10 brands in the 2021 Forces of Good Report, and the number one brand in the food category for Corporate Social Responsibility, which analysed 190 brands.

Grill'd has reportedly recycled over 660,000 litres of cooking oil to create biodiesel and has converted 62 of its restaurants to green power.

== Controversies ==
=== Advertising ===
In June 2026, Grill'd came under fire from employees and an employees group linked to the United Workers Union, Grill'd Workers United, for an advertisement that read "Super Buns to brag about" with the back of an exposed female body. Grill'd later pulled these ads but retained a similar version with a man's bicep used instead of a woman.

=== Partnerships and sponsorships ===
In June 2015, a franchise in Toowong selected Cherish Life to receive funds from the Local Matters program. Founder Simon Crowe apologised for the alleged mistake, stating that Grill'd is pro-choice.

=== Working conditions and pay ===
Grill'd has faced criticism for its labour practices and wage disputes, including allegations of underpaying staff and misusing government apprenticeship programs.

==== Underpayment ====
In July 2015, allegations arose that Kahlani Pyrah, a former employee of a franchise in Camberwell, had been removed from her position after beginning a wage case with the Fair Work Commission for being paid below minimum wage. Grill'd officially denied the allegations, claiming that her bullying of managers was the reason for the dismissal. Pyrah launched a Federal Court case in a bid to get her job back. An interim Federal Court ruling ordered Grill'd to reinstate her, allowing the wage case hearing to go ahead. At the hearing, the Fair Work Commission forced the Grill'd Camberwell franchise to raise employee pay to the minimum wage. Jess Walsh of the hospitality union United Voice said that the ruling was an "enormous win" for Pyrah and Grill'd employees. A planned dismissal hearing at the Federal Court was called off after Pyrah and Grill'd reached an out-of-court settlement.

==== "Hamburger University" and trainee programs ====
In 2019, it was discovered that Grill'd was underpaying employees by exploiting traineeship loopholes, siphoning millions in wages each year. The coverage also included allegations of serious food safety concerns at 1-in-10 company-owned Grill'd restaurants, franchises being mistreated by the company, and founder Simon Crowe falsifying signatures of his business partner on two liquor licenses.

In 2022, it was revealed that Grill'd used $16.6 million (granted by the Australian Government's COVID-19 apprenticeship program) to make 2,800 employees a part of its "hamburger university" traineeship program, which the chain had used to underpay workers.

In October 2024, United Workers Union members and employees of a Grill'd location in Melbourne went on strike, claiming that Grill'd was forcing staff into its "hamburger university" traineeship program in order to pay decreased wages to trainees.

==== Alleged donation misrepresentation ====
In June 2026, Australian Competition and Consumer Commission (ACCC) sued Grill'd over allegations that the company has misled consumers between January 2021 and April 2024. The allegations by the ACCC suggested that Grill'd had misled consumers through their 'Tree Tuesday' promotions (a Grill'd campaign that claimed $1 from every burger purchased on a Tuesday towards the planting of trees). In reality only 17% of the sales qualified for a donation under the promotion due to a series of conditions that were supposedly understated by Grill'd. The ACCC have said they are seeking declarations, penalties, costs and other orders.

== See also ==
- List of hamburger restaurants
- List of restaurant chains in Australia
