= Quicksales =

Australian online auction site, 2005–2018

- Company type: Subsidiary of Carsales.com Ltd
- Website type: Online auction
- Available in: English
- Traded as: ASX: CRZ
- Founded: 2005
- Headquarters: Melbourne, Victoria, Australia
- Area served: Australia and New Zealand
- Founders: Philip Druce and Kelvin Yip
- Industry: Internet, Online retailing
- Website: quicksales.com.au
- Registration: Required to buy and sell
- Launched: As OZtion: January 2005; As Quicksales: 7 February 2011; Relaunched: 16 July 2012
- Current status: defunct 2018

Quicksales (typeset as quicksales) was an online auction site based in Australia, and the second largest auction website in Australia. At one point there were more than 1.8 million items available for auction or purchase and over 515,000 member accounts. The site was defunct as of 2018.

== History ==
The website was founded as OZtion in 2005 by Melbourne based Philip Druce and Kelvin Yip. By May that year there were 2000 members and over 9000 items for sale. The website rose to prominence in May 2008 after rival auction site eBay announced it would force all customers to use PayPal for payment processing. Although eBay later reversed their decision, in six weeks OZtion's sales jumped 50% and its member based jumped by 28,000 to 275,000. The number of new signups also rose, from an average 250 new members per day, to 650 per day.

In June 2008 the founders sold the website to the listed media company Jumbuck Entertainment for $2 million in cash and shares. In April 2010 Jumbuck sold the website to online classifieds company Carsales.com for $1.1 million. On 7 February 2010, the website changed its name to Quicksales.

In 2012, Quicksales became increasingly integrated into sister sites on the Carsales network, handling accessory listing for Carsales, Bikesales and CaravanCampingSales. In turn, stock from these sites were listed on Quicksales to give buyers a greater degree of choices to search from. In July 2012, Quicksales was relaunched, offering free classifieds listings. The site was redesigned, losing the green hue that had been present since its launch in 2005.

On 18 June 2018, Quicksales emailed all members notifying them of the site's closure effective 30 July 2018.

== Community ==
Quicksales uses a "rating" system (similar to the feedback system used on other online sites) for rating transactions. Transactions can be rated by both the buyer and seller as 'Satisfied', 'Neutral' or 'Unsatisfied'. Each Quicksales user is also given an overall rating score based on their transactions, as follows: two points are added for each 'Satisfied' rating; zero points for each 'Neutral' rating, and two points deducted for each 'Unsatisfied' rating.

== Trading ==
Listing items for sale are free, regardless of sale format and include up to twenty photos, with optional paid listing upgrades available

qShops are a unique Quicksales version of online auction shops. They allow sellers to have a searchable store, and include information about their business on a separate page. Owners of qShops are charged $5 per calendar month for the service.

At least one form of verification is required to become a seller.

Forms of verification available are: SMS verification and Landline Telephone verificationaddress verification.

Additional verifications are available after initial account verification are: address verification, credit card verification, photo ID verification (drivers licence or passport), telephone verification and Australia Post verification (which adds address and photo ID verification as well, which is no longer offered).

As of 2007 only residents of Australia and New Zealand are permitted to sell on Quicksales (sellers from other countries registered prior to September 2006 are still allowed to sell). A major difference between Quicksales and more dominant auction sites is that Quicksales allows non-electronic verification (for example, eBay's verification system involves credit card or phone, while its payment system, PayPal, involves bank details).

== Prohibited items ==
A number of items are not permitted to be sold on Quicksales. Some notable examples include:

- Adult items
- Alcohol

An alcohol license is required to list wine and other alcohol on Quicksales. The seller must display their license number on the listing and are responsible for knowing alcohol laws in all states and territories.

- Drugs

No controlled prescription drugs, regardless of herbal or chemical in origin, are permitted for sale.

- Fireworks
- Illegal items
- Lock Picking Devices

Lock picking or lock smithing devices (including key cutters) cannot be listed.

- Tickets Over Face Value

Quicksales does not allow tickets to be re-sold beyond their face value (referred to as ticket scalping). To prevent tickets being sold over their face value they must be listed as "BuyNow Only" (instant purchase, no auction) items with a price below or equal to the face value.

- Used Clothing

Clothing that has been used may be listed, however, the garment must be cleaned before sending. Used underwear and swimwear (including children's) and cloth nappies must not be listed on Quicksales.

- Used Cosmetics
