= CAR Group =

Australian public company

CAR Group Limited
- Formerly: carsales.com ltd
- Type: Public company
- Traded as: ASX: CAR
- Industry: Media, Internet, Online Classifieds and E-Commerce
- Founded: 1997
- Founders: Greg Roebuck; Wal Pisciotta
- Headquarters: Cremorne, Victoria, Australia
- Area served: Australia; Brazil; United States; South Korea; Chile; China; Malaysia; New Zealand; Thailand
- Key people: William Elliott (CEO)
- Revenue: $1,099 million (2024)
- Net income: $344 million (2024)
- Number of employees: 2,300 (2024)
- Subsidiaries: carsales Encar; Trader Interactive webmotors chileautos
- Website: www.cargroup.com

CAR Group Limited (formerly carsales.com Limited), known as CAR Group, is a global digital marketplace company operating primarily in Oceania, Asia and The Americas and is listed on the Australian Securities Exchange.

CAR Group has wholly owned digital marketplace businesses in Australia (carsales), South Korea (Encar), the United States (Trader Interactive) and Chile (chileautos) in addition to being a majority shareholder of webmotors in Brazil.

== History ==
CAR Group, originally named carsales was established in 1997 and founded by Greg Roebuck and Wal Pisciotta in Melbourne, Australia with what was at the time just a small idea of moving print classified advertisements for motor vehicles onto the internet.

In October 2005, carsales acquired ACP Magazines' online classified businesses, including Carpoint.com.au, Boatpoint.com.au, Bikepoint.com.au, Ihub.com.au, and statistic company Equipment Research Group. In exchange, ACP's parent, Publishing & Broadcasting Limited, took a 41% stake in carsales. In August 2007 Red Book was purchased.

In 2009, carsales was listed on the Australian Securities Exchange. In 2010, Quicksales was purchased. In March 2011, Nine Entertainment, previously Publishing & Broadcasting Limited, sold its 49% shareholding in carsales.

In March 2013, carsales purchased a 20% stake in ICar Asia, followed by a 30% shareholding in webmotors of Brazil from Banco Santander the next month. In April 2023, carsales acquired a further 40% stake in webmotors.

In March 2014, a 49% share of SK Encar, Korea was purchased from SK C&C. The remaining 51% was purchased in 2016. In 2016, soloautos of Mexico and chileautos of Chile were purchased.

In 2021, carsales acquired a 49% stake in Trader Interactive, a non-auto marketplace group in the United States. The remaining 51% stake was acquired in 2022.

In 2023, carsales.com Limited was renamed to CAR Group Limited to better reflect the growth and scale of the business outside of Australia. The company’s Australian entity and classified site remains known as carsales, but the entity listed on the Australian Securities Exchange, which owns and controls marketplaces in Australia, Brazil, Chile, South Korea and the U.S., is now known as CAR Group.
