= Ryan Papenhuyzen =

Australian rugby league footballer

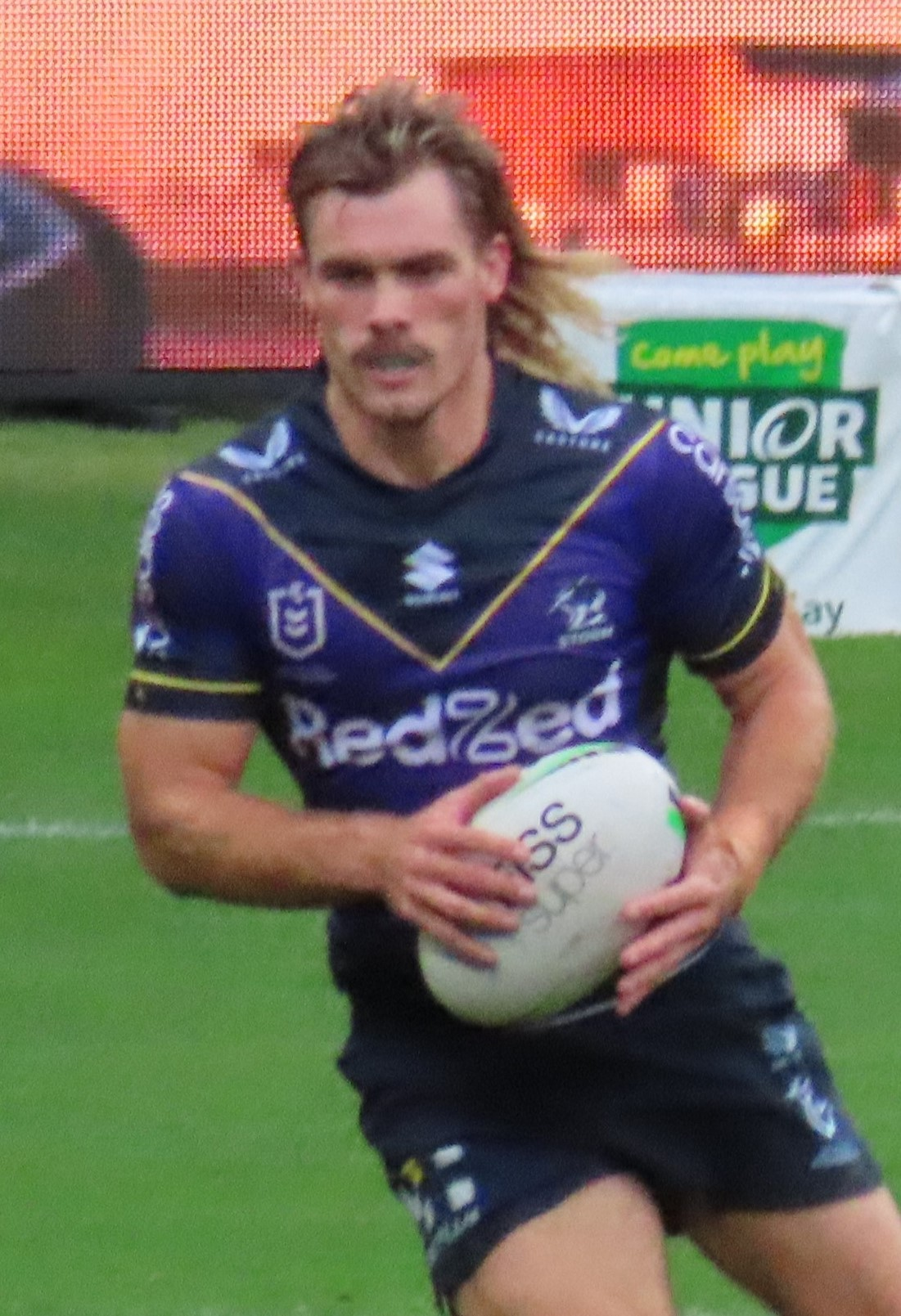

Personal information
- Born: 10 June 1998 (age 28) Sydney, New South Wales, Australia
- Height: 181 cm (5 ft 11 in)
- Weight: 80 kg (12 st 8 lb)

Playing information
- Position: Fullback
Club
Years	Team	Pld	T	G	FG	P
2019–25	Melbourne Storm	113	77	160	6	635
Representative
Years	Team	Pld	T	G	FG	P
2019	Australia 9s	5	1	1	0	6
- Source: As of 5 October 2025

Ryan Papenhuyzen (born 10 June 1998) is an Australian former professional rugby league footballer who last played as a fullback for the Melbourne Storm in the National Rugby League.

Papenhuyzen won the 2020 NRL Grand Final with Melbourne, winning the Clive Churchill Medal. He also played in the 2024 and 2025 NRL Grand Final with the Storm. He represented the Australia title-winning inaugural 9's side in 2019.

== Early life ==
Papenhuyzen was born in Sydney, New South Wales, Australia, and is of Dutch descent.

He grew up in Kellyville, New South Wales, was educated at Oakhill College, Castle Hill where he played three seasons of rugby union in the college's 1st XV (2014–16) and also represented the 2015 Australian Schoolboys in rugby league. After graduating high school, he attended Australian Catholic University studying degree in Physical Activity, Health and Exercise Science.

He played touch football and played his junior rugby league for Kellyville Bushrangers, Dundas Shamrocks and the Hills District Bulls before being signed by Balmain Tigers.

== Career ==
=== Early career ===
Papenhuyzen played his junior representative rugby league for Balmain in the S. G. Ball Cup and Harold Matthews Cup. He later played for the Wests Tigers NRL Under-20s team. He then signed with Melbourne after he was released by the Wests Tigers due to the club wishing to re-sign James Tedesco.

At Melbourne, Papenhuyzen played for their under 20s and feeder team Sunshine Coast Falcons for 2018. With consistent performances, he gained selection for New South Wales under 20s State of Origin.

=== 2019 ===
He made his Melbourne debut while he was only 20 years old in round 4 of the 2019 NRL season against the Canterbury-Bankstown Bulldogs. He had his Melbourne jersey (cap number 194) presented to him by former Melbourne player Billy Slater. Papenhuyzen had a breakout performance in round 9 against the Parramatta Eels at Suncorp Stadium. Coming onto the field in the 50th minute, he scored a try, ran for 137 metres, and had three line breaks, two line-break assists and two try assists as Melbourne won 64–10.

On 8 October, Papenhuyzen earned his first representative jersey as he was named in the Australian side for the 2019 Rugby League World Cup 9s. Later that day, he was named at fullback in the Under-23s Junior Kangaroos squad. Papenhuyzen scored two tries in the Junior Kangaroos’ 62–4 victory over France.

=== 2020 ===
In a Round 8 match against the Sydney Roosters, Melbourne were down 25–24 with 40 seconds remaining. Melbourne regathered from the kick-off and with time running out, Papenhuyzen kicked an equalising field goal, his first in the NRL.

In the 2020 NRL Grand Final, which Melbourne won 26–20, Papenhuyzen won the Clive Churchill Medal for his Man of the Match performance.

Papenhuyzen was selected in the NSW Origin squad for the 2020 State of Origin series, but was withdrawn from selection for game one through injury. He was not selected in the team for either game two or three.

=== 2021 ===
Papenhuyzen began the 2021 season at fullback and as designated goal kicker after the retirement of Cameron Smith. In Round 4, Melbourne defeated the Brisbane Broncos 40–6 with Papenhuyzen scoring four tries in 11 minutes. This equaled, what was at the time, the club record for the most scored in a single game. Papenhuyzen also kicked five goals in this game and with a combined points total of 26, he climbed into second place for the most points scored in a single game by a Melbourne Storm player. By the end of this round he was in first place on the league's list for most points scored. In Round 10 against St. George Illawarra, Papenhuyzen suffered a severe concussion after a high tackle from Tyrell Fuimaono in the 11th minute of the game, ruling him out of a place in NSW's State of Origin squad for 2021 and ruling him out for the majority of the season. Papenhuyzen returned to Melbourne's starting side in Round 19 against North Queensland, playing only 33 minutes from the interchange bench.

Papenhuyzen played a total of 15 games for Melbourne in the 2021 NRL season and scored 14 tries as the club won 19 matches in a row and claimed the Minor Premiership. Papenhuyzen scored 157 points for the season. He played in both finals matches including the preliminary final where Melbourne was defeated by the eventual premiers Penrith.

=== 2022 ===
In Round 4 of the 2022 NRL season, Papenhuyzen set a new career-high points in a game with 28 points against Canterbury-Bankstown Bulldogs, scoring four tries and six goals. In round 9 of the 2022 NRL season, Papenhuyzen was taken from the field during Melbourne's victory over St. George Illawarra. It was later announced that Papenhuyzen would miss four to six matches with a hamstring and knee injury. In round 16, Papenhuyzen made his return to the Melbourne side and scored two tries in a 36–30 loss against Manly.

In round 18, Papenhuyzen was taken from the field in Melbourne's 20–16 loss against Canberra with a suspected fractured kneecap. On 19 July, it was confirmed that Papenhuyzen would miss the remainder of the 2022 NRL season.

While recovering from injury, in November Papenhuyzen would win the 2022 Australian Open golf pro-am, held at the Victoria Golf Club.

=== 2023 ===
Papenhuyzen missed the first twenty two rounds of the 2023 NRL season due to a shattered kneecap, returning on August 5 to play for the Sunshine Coast Falcons in Queensland cup. Papenhuyzen returned to first grade in round 26 of the 2023 NRL Season and scored his first try of the season in round 27. Papenhuyzen suffered a season ending fracture to his ankle while he was tackling the Brisbane Broncos Tom Flegler, he was caught in the tackle with teammate Nelson Asofa-Solomona in Melbourne's 26–0 loss to Brisbane in week one of the finals. Due to it being his second severe leg injury, many fans believed his career was over, however in the aftermath it was revealed that Papenhuyzen was expected to be cleared to play by the commencement of the following season.

=== 2024 ===
Papenhuyzen returned to the side in round 1, in which Melbourne defeated the Penrith Panthers 8–0. The side would go on to win all but one of their first 8 matches, leaving them in first place on the ladder. In their round 9 22–20 victory against the Gold Coast Titans, Papenhuyzen began limping after a routine tackle, which resulted in him leaving the field. It was revealed the following day that Papenhuyzen had suffered a small fracture in his surgically repaired leg, which would leave him sidelined for four to six weeks. Papenhuyzen played a total of 20 matches for Melbourne in the 2024 NRL season including their grand final loss to Penrith. On 12 December, the Storm announced that Papenhuyzen had signed a one-year extension with the club until the end of 2026.

=== 2025 ===
In round 10 of the 2025 NRL season, Papenhuyzen scored four tries in Melbourne's 64–0 victory over the Wests Tigers. Papenhuyzen played 21 games for Melbourne in the 2025 NRL season including their 26-22 2025 NRL Grand Final loss against Brisbane.

On 30 October 2025, Papenhuyzen was released by Melbourne, with a year remaining on his contract to pursue opportunities outside of the sport. In January 2026, during a podcast episode with Team Mates Jahrome Hughes and Cameron Munster, Papenhuyzen said that he was "practically retired" after suffering multiple head knocks in the 2025 Grand Final which 'rattled him a bit'.

== Honours ==
Melbourne Storm

- NRL premiership: 2020
- NRL minor premiership: 2019, 2021, 2024

Individual

- Clive Churchill Medal: 2020
- Melbourne Storm Rookie of the Year: 2019
- Melbourne Storm Back of the Year: 2020, 2021, 2022

== Statistics ==
=== Club ===
†	Denotes seasons in which Papenhuyzen won an NRL Premiership

Season	Team	Matches	T	G	GK %	F/G	Pts
2019	Melbourne	22	9	2	66.67%	0	40
2020†	Melbourne	20	11	4	44.44%	1	53
2021	Melbourne	15	14	49	85.96%	2 (Note: Includes 1 two point field goal.)	157
2022	Melbourne	12	14	41	78.85%	1	139
2023	Melbourne	3	1	4	66.67%	0	12
2024	Melbourne	20	13	0	0	1	53
2025	Melbourne	21	15	23	88.46%	0	74
Career totals		113	77	123	80.39%	5	528

As at round 9 of the 2025 NRL season.
