= Cherish Life Queensland =

Queensland anti-abortion group

Cherish Life Queensland (originally known as Queensland Right to Life) is a Queensland anti-abortion group. It is non-denominational anti-abortion organisation founded in Brisbane in 1970, before the emergence of similar organisations in other Australian states. Cherish Life Queensland is the state affiliate for the Federation of Right to Life Associations.

== History ==
Cherish Life Queensland was formed in 1970 by a group of concerned Christian women who saw what was happening in America in regards to the push for the legalisation of abortion and wanted to prevent its legalisation in their state. Since its inception as Queensland Right to Life, it has been funded by entirely by donations alone.

At the General Meeting on 21 June 2008, the members present voted for a change of name from "Queensland Right to Life" to "Cherish Life Queensland", which they believed would more accurately represent their opposition to embryonic stem cell research, assisted suicide, as well as abortion.

In May 2019, Anna Palmer, wife of Australian businessman Clive Palmer donated $20,000 to Cherish Life Queensland for electoral purposes.
