= BLK (sportswear) =

Australian sportswear company

BLK Sport
- Formerly: KooGa Australia (1999–2011)
- Type: Private
- Industry: Textile
- Founded: 1999; 27 years ago
- Headquarters: Helensvale, Queensland, Australia
- Area served: Worldwide
- Products: Accessories, apparel, sportswear
- Parent: Esperança Timor Oan
- Website: blksport.com

BLK (initials for "Beyond Limits Known") is an Australian sporting goods manufacturing company which was established in 1999 in the city of Gold Coast in Queensland.

== History ==
The overall but now heavily transitioned company has origins as far back as 1999, but evolved from the Australian arm of the brand KooGa. Australian founder Kim Brant began to re-brand KooGa Australia to 'BLK' in 2011. Kooga New Zealand was independent and had no ownership connection with Kooga Australia nor BLK.

== Acquisition ==
The parent company of BLK, World Rugby Specialists, was placed into external receivership in November 2016. In January 2017, BLK was acquired by a consortium of Fijian and East Timor investors (led by oil and energy company Esperança Timor Oan), amid BLK's financial issues.

== Sponsorships ==
BLK is the official supplier and sponsor of sports teams, players, associations and events, including:

=== Rugby union ===
==== National teams ====
- Kenya
- Namibia

==== Club teams ====
- (South Africa) Cheetahs
- (South Africa) Free State Cheetahs
- (England) London Irish
- (Australia) Melbourne Rebels

=== Rugby League ===
==== National teams ====
- New Zealand

==== Club Teams ====
- (Canada) Toronto Wolfpack

== See also ==
- List of fitness wear brands
