= Aaron Teroi =

Cook Islands international rugby league footballer

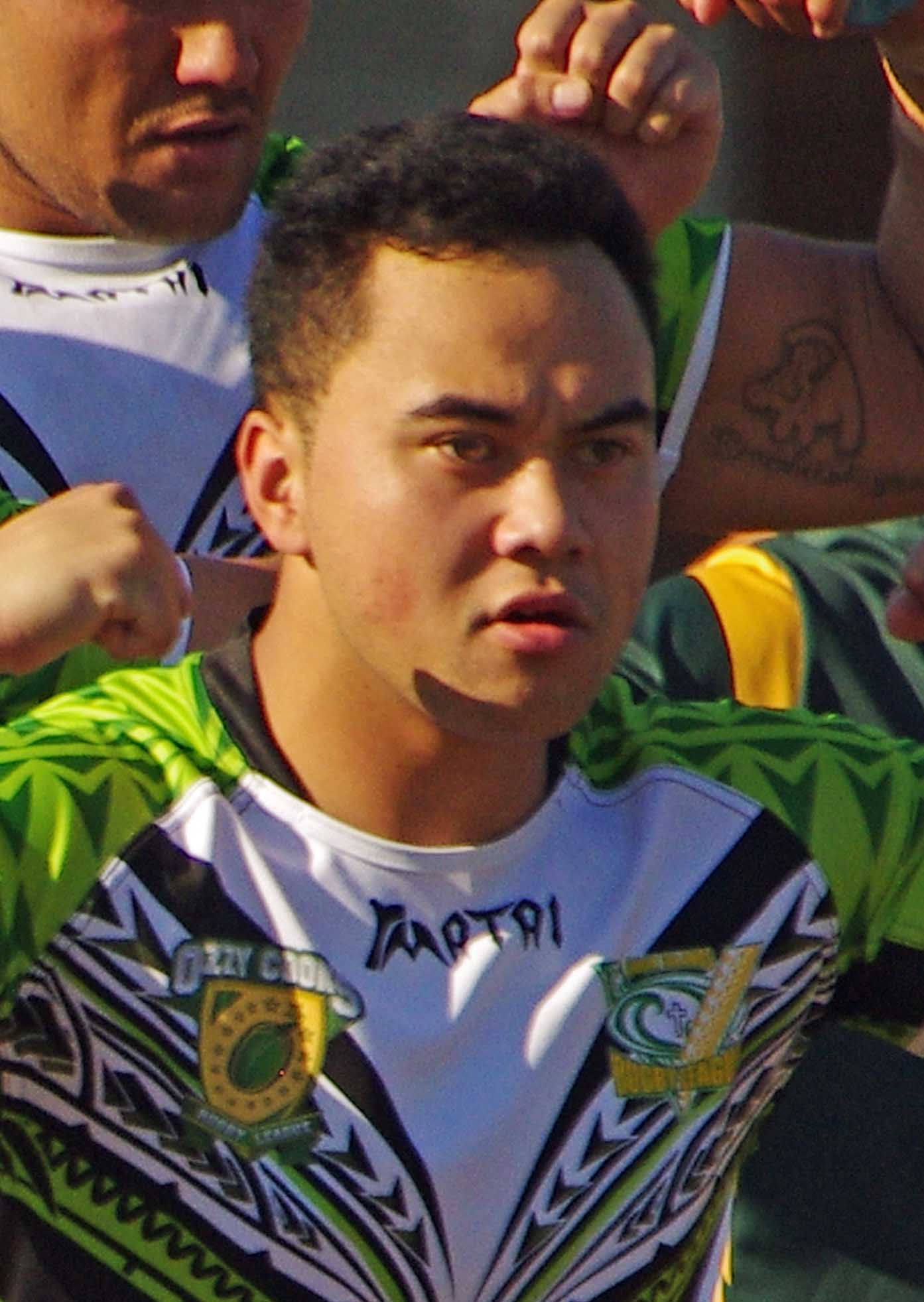

Personal information
- Born: 2 October 1995 (age 31) Melbourne, Victoria, Australia
- Height: 182 cm (6 ft 0 in)
- Weight: 90 kg (14 st 2 lb)

Playing information
- Position: Hooker, Scrum-half
Club
Years	Team	Pld	T	G	FG	P
2016–17	Newcastle Thunder	41	3	0	0	12
Representative
Years	Team	Pld	T	G	FG	P
2015–	Cook Islands	8	1	0	0	4
2019	Cook Islands 9s	3	1	0	0	4
- Source: As of 7 November 2022

Aaron Teroi (born 2 October 1995) is a Cook Islands international rugby league footballer who plays as a halfback and hooker for the Central Queensland Capras in the Hostplus Cup.

== Background ==
Teroi was born in Melbourne, Victoria, Australia and educated at Craigieburn Secondary College.

He played his junior rugby league for the Northern Thunder RLFC in Broadmeadows before being signed by the Melbourne Storm.

== Playing career ==
In 2012 and 2013, Teroi played for Melbourne Storm's SG Ball Cup side. In 2014 and 2015, he played for Melbourne's NYC side, being awarded the Greg Brentnall Victorian Young Achievers award at the end of the 2015 season.

In October 2015, Teroi made his international début for the Cook Islands in the 2017 Rugby League World Cup qualification Asia-Pacific play-off.

In January 2016, Teroi joined the Newcastle Thunder in England's Kingstone Press League 1.

In June 2019 he was named to the Cook Islands squad for the 2019 Rugby League World Cup 9s.

In 2022 he was named to the Cook Islands team against Wales in the (delayed) 2021 Men's Rugby League World Cup.
