= Jezaiah Funa =

Australian rugby league footballer (born 2006)

Personal information
- Full name: Jezaiah Funa-Iuta
- Born: 14 March 2006 (age 20) Campbelltown, NSW, Australia
- Height: 175 cm (5 ft 9 in)
- Weight: 104 kg (16 st 5 lb)

Playing information
- Position: Second-row
Club
Years	Team	Pld	T	G	FG	P
2026–	Parramatta Eels	1	0	0	0	0
- Source: RLP As of 10 November 2026

Jezaiah Funa-Iuta (born 14 March 2006) is an Australian rugby league footballer for the Parramatta Eels in the National Rugby League (NRL).

== Early life ==
Born and raised in Sydney, Funa is of mixed Polynesian and Papua New Guinean descent. He attended Patrician Brothers' College, Fairfield, and gained 2023 Australian Schoolboys representative honours. His younger brother Leviticus is a professional rugby union player in France.

== Career ==
A Cabramatta Two Blues junior, Funa is a second-rower and started out at Parramatta in the Harold Matthews Cup, where he was a captain and best and fairest winner. He was a member of the 2025 New South Wales under-19s State of Origin side. In 2026, Funa made his NRL debut against the Dolphins at Suncorp Stadium. He enters Parramatta's Top 30 squad in 2027.
