= Apa Twidle =

New Zealand rugby league footballer

Personal information
- Full name: Te Hurinui Apanui Twidle
- Born: 15 December 2004 (age 21) Ngāruawāhia, New Zealand

Playing information
- Position: Halfback, Wing, Fullback
Club
Years	Team	Pld	T	G	FG	P
2026	Parramatta Eels	4	4	0	0	16
2027–	Perth Bears	0	0	0	0	0
	Total	4	4	0	0	16
- Source: As of 25 October 2026

Te Hurinui ‘Apa’ Twidle is a New Zealand rugby league footballer who plays for the Perth Bears in the NRL.

== Career ==
At 16, Twidle moved to Queensland from New Zealand, he played in the Queensland Rugby League's Cyril Connell and Mal Meninga Cup competitions, as well as at local club Souths Acacia Ridge Magpies.

Twidle was scouted by Parramatta Eels and played in their NSWRL premiership winning under-18 in 2023. He went on to play for the under-21s and then for the reserves side.

The weekend before his NRL debut he scored four tries in a 26–26 draw with Penrith in NSW Cup.

He was selected in the wider squad for the fifth round of the 2026 NRL season against the Wests Tigers. After Bailey Simonsson came off due to an ankle dislocation, Twidle came onto the pitch, within 30 seconds of being on the pitch in his first carry Twidle scored a try. He went on to score another try for Parramatta in the 20–22 loss.

On 1 May 2026, Twidle signed a three-year deal to join the newly admitted Perth side ahead of the 2027 NRL season.
