= Araz Nanva =

Australian rugby league footballer (born 2004)

Personal information
- Born: 29 February 2004 (age 22) Westmead, New South Wales, Australia

Playing information
- Position: Centre
Club
Years	Team	Pld	T	G	FG	P
2026–	Parramatta Eels	3	1	0	0	4
- Source: As of 10 November 2026

Araz Nanva (born 29 February 2004) is an Australian rugby league footballer for the Parramatta Eels in the National Rugby League (NRL).

== Early years ==
Nanva was born in Sydney and attended Hills Sports High School.

Of Kurdish descent, Nanva comes from a Sorani-speaking family who emigrated from Iran a year before his birth.

== Career ==
Nanva, an outside back, initially played juniors for the Dragons, via the Rouse Hill Rhinos, before joining Parramatta in 2023.

Having establishment himself in the Eels' NSW Cup side as a centre, Nanva broke into first-grade during the 2026 NRL season, debuting against the Gold Coast Titans in round six. He scored his first NRL try in the Eels' round 19 loss to the Sydney Roosters.

== Personal life ==
Nanva is an apprentice carpenter outside of rugby league.
