= Teancum Brown =

Australian rugby league footballer (born 2004)

Personal information
- Full name: Teancum Rimoni Brown
- Born: 26 May 2004 (age 22) Liverpool, New South Wales, Australia
- Height: 188 cm (6 ft 2 in)
- Weight: 108 kg (17 st 0 lb)

Playing information
- Position: Prop
Club
Years	Team	Pld	T	G	FG	P
2026–	Parramatta Eels	12	0	0	0	0
- Source: RLP

Teancum Brown (born 26 May 2004) is an Australian rugby league footballer for the Parramatta Eels in the National Rugby League (NRL).

Brown was born in Sydney and is of Samoan descent.

A prop, Brown played his early rugby league for the Glenmore Park Brumbies in the Penrith district competition. He came initially through the Wests Tigers junior pathways, playing for the Western Suburbs Magpies' Harold Matthews and SG Ball Cup sides, before moving to Parramatta in 2024. He made 12 appearances for the Eels during the 2026 NRL season, debuting against Canterbury-Bankstown in round 14, and is signed on until the end of 2028.
