= Parramatta Eels =

Australian rugby league football club

Club information
- Full name: Parramatta National Rugby League Club Limited
- Nickname(s): Eels, Parra, Blue and Gold Army, Fruitpickers, Slipperies
- Short name: PAR
- Colours: Blue; Gold
- Founded: 4 November 1946 as Parramatta
- Website: parraeels.com.au

Current details
- Ground: Western Sydney Stadium (30,000)
- CEO: Jim Sarantinos
- Chairman: Sean McElduff
- Coach: Jason Ryles (NRL); Steve Georgallis (NRLW)
- Captain: Mitchell Moses (NRL); Mahalia Murphy (NRLW)
- Competition: National Rugby League
- 2026 season: 13th
- Current season

Uniforms
Home colours	Away colours

Records
- Premierships: 4 (1981, 1982, 1983, 1986)
- Runners-up: 6 (1976, 1977, 1984, 2001, 2009, 2022)
- Minor premierships: 5 (1977, 1982, 1986, 2001, 2005)
- NSW Cup: 8 (1975, 1977, 1979, 1997, 1999, 2005, 2006, 2007)
- Wooden spoons: 14 (1947, 1952, 1954, 1956, 1957, 1958, 1959, 1960, 1961, 1970, 1972, 2012, 2013, 2018)
- Most capped: 330 – Nathan Hindmarsh
- Highest try scorer: 124 – Luke Burt
- Highest points scorer: 1971 – Mick Cronin

The Parramatta Eels are an Australian professional rugby league football club based in the Western Sydney suburb of Parramatta that competes in the National Rugby League (NRL).

The Parramatta District Rugby League Football Club was formed in 1947, and their home ground was Cumberland Oval. After the 1981 grand final win fans damaged Cumberland Oval which was later replaced by Parramatta stadium on the same site. As of 2019, Parramatta's home ground stadium has been rebuilt and they now play as the co-tenants at Western Sydney Stadium, which sits on the same site that was once Parramatta Stadium.

It took thirty years for the club to make the grand final, which they did in 1976 and 1977, losing on both occasions. However, this period foreshadowed their most successful period in the early 1980s, when they won four premierships and qualified for five grand finals in six seasons. This was a golden era for the club and yielded their only premiership titles. In 2016, a salary cap breach saw them stripped of their 2016 Auckland Nines premiership. The club plays in the NRL, the premier rugby league football competition in Australia. Parramatta sides are also fielded in lower grades and junior competitions run by the New South Wales Rugby League.

== History ==
The playing of rugby union and rugby league in Parramatta lie in the 19th century with the formation of the Parramatta Rugby Club in 1879. With the advent of a Sydney District competition in 1900, the Parramatta club merged with Western Suburbs and played some of its matches at Cumberland Oval. On a local level, rugby league began to be played in 1910 when a district competition was formed. Other clubs in the Parramatta district also emerged; over the ensuing decades, clubs established in suburbs throughout the area.

Pressure in the area for a local club to participate in the New South Wales Rugby League premiership began in the mid-1930s with a formal proposal put to the NSWRL in 1936 by local rugby league identities such as Jack Argent and Jack Scullin. The proposal was rejected by all clubs except Western Suburbs who, despite having the most to lose from the entrance of a Parramatta side (with much of their territory being lost to Parramatta), voted for the entrance of the new club. The advent of World War II put the establishment of the club on hold and a Parramatta district club was not proposed again until 1946 when the club was successfully admitted into the Premiership.

=== Foundation and early years ===
Parramatta saw little success in their early years, despite narrowly missing out on finals qualification in 1949 under the guidance of former Western Suburbs and Leeds five-eighth Vic Hey. Between 1952 and 1961, they finished last eight times and won only 35 of 180 matches. The reasons behind the club doing so poorly in the early years was due to a lack of resources and a weak playing roster. Where other teams fielded test and representative players, Parramatta fielded mainly amateur players or park footballers. The only players of note during this dark period were Billy Rayner and Brian Hambly.

In 1962, Parramatta made the finals for the first time; this achievement was repeated for the three following seasons under coach Ken Kearney. Around this time the club managed to finally attract better players such as Ken Thornett, Dick Thornett and Bob O'Reilly. However, the club slid back down the ladder in the following years, collecting the wooden spoon in 1970 and 1972. The club's first major success came in 1975 when they defeated Manly-Warringah in the pre-season cup final.

=== 1970s ===
In 1976, the club finally reached the grand final, in their thirtieth season. However, they lost narrowly to a Manly-Warringah side that they had defeated just two weeks earlier. Both clubs had been admitted into the NSWRFL in 1947, and Parramatta were in their first grand final while Manly were in their eighth premiership decider (having qualified for their first in 1951) and were bidding for their third premiership after wins in 1972 and 1973. Unfortunately for Parramatta, this game is regarded as "the one that got away" with Manly winning 13-10 despite the Eels crossing for two tries to Manly's one. A dropped pass by winger Neville Glover with the line wide open in the dying moments of the game ultimately costing the Eels a chance to win the game. Had Glover scored the score would have been tied at 13-all giving goal kicking Five-eighth John Peard a sideline conversion attempt to win the game.

The following year, Parramatta captured their first minor premiership before qualifying for the grand final for the second year running. Against St. George, the match was drawn 9–9, forcing a replay the following weekend. In this match, Parramatta lost 22–0. The Eels made the finals in both 1978 and 1979, but missed the finals in 1980 for the first time since 1974.

=== 1980s ===
Chart of yearly table positions for Parramatta Eels in First Grade Rugby League

The early 1980s was the most successful period for Parramatta, who earned five grand final appearances and four premierships from 1981 to 1986. Under the influence of coach Jack Gibson and with a team including names such as Ray Price, Peter Sterling, Eric Grothe, Sr., Steve Ella, Mick Cronin, and Brett Kenny the club captured three consecutive premierships from 1981 to 1983, beating the Newtown Jets in 1981 and the Manly-Warringah Sea Eagles in 1982 and 1983. In 1984 the team once again reached the Grand Final, but lost in a low-scoring game to the Canterbury-Bankstown Bulldogs 6–4. In 1986, the club took out their third minor premiership while also reaching the grand final, beating Canterbury 4–2 in the second lowest-scoring decider in history. This win proved to be most notably among the victories in the club's history, ending Canterbury's two year premiership winning streak. The fourth premiership victory capped off a strong period for the club, between 1975 and 1986, the club had only missed the finals once and played in seven grand finals, winning four.

=== 1990s ===
From 1987 to 1996, the Parramatta club failed to make the finals. With the advent of the Super League war in the mid-1990s, Parramatta capitalised on staying with the Australian Rugby League by picking up high-profile players such as Dean Pay, Jason Smith, Jim Dymock and Jarrod McCracken from the 1995 premiership-winning side, the Sydney Bulldogs.

In 1997, the Eels remained in the ARL's competition and made the finals for the first time in 11 seasons by finishing third in the Australian Rugby League competition. Parramatta continued into the NRL era which began in 1998, surviving the reduction in teams at the end of the twentieth century. In the 1998 NRL season Parramatta finished 4th and defeated North Sydney in the first week of the finals 25–12. The following week Parramatta traveled to Brisbane in the major semi final and won the match 15-10 earning the week off.

In the 1998 preliminary final Parramatta were leading arch rivals Canterbury 18–2 with less than 10 minutes to play only for Canterbury to fight their way back into the match and with a minute left on the scoreboard, winger Daryl Halligan kicked a conversion from out on the far touchline to send the game into extra time. Canterbury won in extra time 32–20. The loss was hard to take for Parramatta as they had beaten eventual premiers Brisbane twice during the season.

In 1999, Parramatta led Melbourne 16–0 at halftime in the preliminary final only to lose 18–16 at full time. Melbourne went on to win the premiership the following week. In the 2000 NRL season, Parramatta finished 7th and won both their sudden death finals matches to take on Brisbane in the preliminary final. In a game that they were not expected to win, Parramatta came close but lost the match against a much stronger Brisbane side. This was their 3rd preliminary final loss in a row.

=== 2000s ===
The Eels reached the 2001 NRL Grand final after a dominant regular season, where they scored a total of 839 points and lost only 4 matches, but were defeated by the Newcastle Knights 30–24. The week leading up to the grand final itself is also remembered for The infamous 2001 grand final breakfast where coach Brian Smith and the Parramatta players attended wearing as Newcastle player Mark Hughes described "Miami Vice black suits". Another Newcastle player Ben Kennedy reflected on the game saying "They came into the game under a sh*tload of pressure but for us, it was just a good time and a heap of fun. Parra were sh*tting themselves and we were just having a good time". Andrew Johns also reportedly could tell how nervous the Parramatta players were and knew they had a chance at making an upset.

In 2005, Parramatta finished as minor premiers in the regular season and came up against North Queensland in the preliminary final. In a game that Parramatta were expected to win, North Queensland defied the odds and won the match 29–0. In 2006, Parramatta finished 8th in the regular season and faced Melbourne in the first week of the finals losing 12–6 and thus being eliminated from the competition. In 2007, Parramatta again made the preliminary final and once more the opponent was Melbourne. Parramatta went on to lose the match 26–10. This was their 5th preliminary final loss in nine years.

In 2009, under new coach Daniel Anderson, the Eels had an indifferent start to the season which saw the release of star halfback Brett Finch. After 18 rounds and incredibly inconsistent form, the Parramatta Eels had won only five games and were sitting third-last and were in direct contention for the dreaded 2009 NRL Wooden Spoon. TAB SportsBet had the Eels as $151 outsiders to win the NRL Premiership.

Though beginning in Round 19, upset victories against the Melbourne Storm and the Canterbury-Bankstown Bulldogs set the platform for an unexpected 10 wins from the next 11 games, which propelled the Eels into the Top 8 and consequently, premiership contention. This unanticipated winning streak was directly attributed by many sporting experts including Rugby League legend Andrew Johns to the spectacular run of form of star fullback Jarryd Hayne. Winning the award for man-of-the-match in every game from Round 19–24, and again in the first week of the finals, Hayne was described as "the best player in any code of football in Australia" by premiership-winning coach Phil Gould. Following his astonishing string of 7-man-of-the-match performances, Hayne won the award for Dally M Fullback of the Year and was crowned the best and fairest player in the game, winning the Dally M Medal for 2009.

After a seven-game winning streak, the Eels succumbed to a heavy defeat by the minor premiers St George-Illawarra Dragons, however they returned to Kogarah in Week 1 of the 2009 NRL Finals Series and defeated the Dragons 25–12 featuring an impressive late game try by Dally M medal winner Jarryd Hayne. Following successive wins against the Gold Coast Titans (a team that Parramatta had never beaten before), 27–2 at SFS and Canterbury-Bankstown, 22–12 in front of a record-breaking non-grand final crowd of 74,549 at ANZ stadium, the Eels qualified for their first grand final since 2001. On 4 October 2009, Parramatta Eels played the deciding game of NRL, against the Melbourne Storm at ANZ Stadium in front of a crowd of 82,538. The Melbourne Storm defeated the Eels 23–16, ending what critics called "the Parramatta Fairytale" and winning the NRL Premiership. Such was the euphoria at the time with Parramatta making an incredible run to the 2009 grand final that the then NSW Premier Nathan Rees pledged that if Parramatta were to win the premiership he would rename two of the new trains due to be rolled out across The Sydney network the following year. The names of the new trains were to be "The Hayne Train" and "The Fuifui Moimoi Express". They were to be painted blue and gold, and run along the western line of the railway network.

=== 2010s ===
On 22 April 2010, the Melbourne Storm were stripped of the premiership as a result of long-term gross salary cap breaches disclosed by the NRL. However, the premiership for 2009 was not handed over to the Parramatta Eels, instead remaining vacant.

In 2010, the Parramatta club were picked at the beginning of the year by many leading betting agencies to take out the premiership for 2010 following their surge of form which took them to the grand final in 2009. But, after a relatively poor start to the season, and then a four-game winning streak, the Parramatta side once again returned to the inconsistent form of past seasons. This inconsistent form, recognised by all Rugby League fans, saw them miss out on the Top 8 in 2010.

After a season of unrelenting disappointment which saw five-eighth Daniel Mortimer dropped to reserve grade, centre Timana Tahu being suspended for an on-field confrontation against the Newcastle Knights and reports of player rifts, Daniel Anderson was sacked unceremoniously as Parramatta coach and replaced by New Zealand World Cup-winning coach Stephen Kearney.

The Parramatta club made several new player signings for the 2011 season. In the forwards, the Eels added former Queensland centre Carl Webb and former Bulldogs and Cronulla as well as one-time Kangaroo Reni Maitua. To bolster the backs after the retirement of Eric Grothe Jr and the departure of Timana Tahu, the Eels signed the experienced pair of Chris Walker and Chris Hicks.

The 2011 season was to be considered a year of "almosts" for Parramatta, with the team losing over half of their matches by four points or fewer, many of which were conceded after attaining leads over their opponents. Parramatta pushed a record four games into Golden Point during the season, however were unable to win any, resulting in a draw against the St. George Illawarra Dragons and one-point losses to the Penrith Panthers, Sydney Roosters and the Canterbury-Bankstown Bulldogs.

Throughout the 2011 season, coach Stephen Kearney motioned several reshuffles of the Parramatta side, the most high-profile change being fullback Jarryd Hayne's switch to five-eighth after his ball-playing abilities were considered by several experts including the NSW State of Origin coach Ricky Stuart, as his strongest point. Other switches include the moving of Luke Burt to fullback, second-rower Ben Smith to right centre, and the resting of five-eighth Daniel Mortimer.

Before the final match of their season, Parramatta had won only five of their 24 games and were in contention for the dreaded wooden spoon. During their final match, the Parramatta side emerged victorious over the Gold Coast Titans who were also direct contenders for last place. The wooden spoon was awarded to the Gold Coast side, finishing 16th on the NRL ladder, the club finishing in 14th position.

The 2012 season saw the retirement of Parramatta legends Luke Burt and Nathan Hindmarsh. It would also mark the first time since 1972 that the team would succumb to the dreaded wooden spoon. Parramatta struggled all year, securing just their first win of the season in Round 5 against defending premiers Manly-Warringah Sea Eagles before ending a six-game losing streak against the Cronulla-Sutherland Sharks. This horror start to the season, and a win rate of less than 25% over almost two seasons with the club, coach Stephen Kearney was forced to resign and Assistant Coach Brad Arthur would become caretaker. The team responded to this producing 3 wins from 4 games, including competition front-runners Melbourne Storm and Brisbane Broncos to give the fans some hope for the rest of the season. However this was short lived and following a 38-6 thumping to the South Sydney Rabbitohs in Round 25 of the Telstra Premiership were officially unable to avoid the wooden spoon.

Whilst Parramatta's problems in 2012 were largely attributed to their relatively poor defence, numerous pundits blamed them on the recurring absences of star fullback Jarryd Hayne. Even whilst producing higher per-match statistics than any other fullback in the game (8 tries, 14 try-assists), Hayne only managed to complete 10 games from the season's 24, due to both injury and State of Origin duty.

Throughout the season many of the Parramatta players came under scrutiny and were dropped to the NSW Cup, including high-profile recruit Chris Sandow, who at the time was touted as overweight and unfit, and veteran Luke Burt. As a result, players Matt Ryan, Jake Mullaney and Nathan Smith were called up to the top squad and have impressed in their roles of Second-Row, Fullback and Hooker respectively, making a suitable replacement for injured stars Jarryd Hayne and Matt Keating.

Towards the end of the season Ricky Stuart was announced as the new coach for the Parramatta Eels from 2013. In June 2013, head coach Ricky Stuart told twelve Parramatta players via an overhead projector that their services would not be required beyond the 2013 season.

Another wooden spoon followed at the end of 2013, with the club suffering their second biggest loss ever (4–64 to Melbourne in round 24), and conceding three other scores of 50 or more. On 12 September 2013, it was announced Ricky Stuart would leave Parramatta to take up the head coaching role at Canberra for the 2014 season.

Parramatta were determined to continue their rebuilding process in the off-season after receiving the wooden spoon two years running. The club did this by releasing the aforementioned twelve players and signing more in key areas to help them achieve success in the 2014 season.

Parramatta also recruited a new coach in Brad Arthur, formerly an Assistant Coach at the club, as Ricky Stuart reneged on the final two years of his contract. This was in order to return to his hometown of Canberra, the team he played for during his youth. Before the 2014 season started, Brad Arthur and Parramatta implemented a new recruitment policy and made strong signings including future NSW hooker Nathan Peats, promising star Corey Norman and William Hopoate who was a 2011 premiership winner and NSW representative before leaving rugby league to join a two-year Mormon mission.

The 2014 season started off in great style as Parramatta won four out of their first six matches. Parramatta then went into their Easter Monday clash at Stadium Australia sitting 5th on the ladder but lost the match controversially 21–18 in front of 50,000 fans. In round 24 Parramatta were sitting 8th on the ladder and looked destined to play in the finals for the first time since 2009 and only needed to win one of their last two remaining games against sides lower than them on the table which were Canberra and Newcastle. Parramatta lost both matches and missed out on the finals series by two competition points.

The 2015 season was a year to forget for Parramatta as they finished 12th on the table. The highlights being in round 1 when Parramatta defeated Manly 42–12 and Semi Radradra scoring 24 tries in 18 matches.

==== 2016 salary cap breach ====
The discovery by the NRL in 2016 of salary cap breaches, over a period of four years, resulted in it stripping the Parramatta club of the twelve competition points the club has accrued so far in the 2016 NRL season. In addition to being fined $1 million, Parramatta also had its 2016 NRL Auckland Nines title revoked. On 19 July 2016 the Parramatta Leagues Club board was sacked by the Independent Liquor and Gaming Authority, and an administrator appointed. This effectively also removed the Parramatta board as the seven directors on both boards were the same people. Max Donnelly, of Ferrier Hodgson was appointed administrator. At the time of the 12-point deduction, Parramatta were sitting 5th on the ladder but then found themselves at 14th position.

Prior to the start of the 2016 NRL season, the Parramatta Eels faced the prospect with starting the season on −4 points due to salary cap indiscretions in 2015, however the NRL was satisfied with governance changes at the Eels and no points were deducted.

However, it was revealed in March that third-party payments had been made by several companies to several players, which is strictly prohibited in the NRL.

On 3 May 2016, NRL CEO Todd Greenberg announced that the club would be docked the twelve competition points they have accrued so far this season, as well as fined $1 million and stripped of the 2016 NRL Auckland Nines title it won in February. In addition, the NRL also announced that the Eels would not be able to accrue any further competition points until they fall under the salary cap, which they were reported to be $500,000 over as of 3 May 2016. Five officials, including chairman Steve Sharp, deputy chairman Tom Issa, director Peter Serrao, chief executive John Boulous and football manager Daniel Anderson, were also sacked.

On 9 July, after over two months of club officials contesting the preliminary penalties, Parramatta were handed an additional punishment with the deduction of their for/against points tally accumulated from rounds 1 through 9.

The main point of interest in this episode was the manner of the punishment when compared to the Melbourne Storm salary cap breach in 2010, while the Melbourne Storm were not allowed to play for points for the whole season the Parramatta Eels were permitted to play for points as soon as they fell back in line with the cap. It was acknowledged that this change was made due to the demoralising nature of the Storm punishment and having to witness a team running out week after week with nothing to play for.

The aftermath ended with Parramatta hooker Nathan Peats being squeezed out of the club, so the club would be just under the salary cap and start playing for competition points for the remainder of the season. Though this did very little for the troubled club finishing the NRL season 13th on the ladder winning only six of their last 14 matches.

Their first match played after the points deduction was against South Sydney at Parramatta Stadium, Parramatta lost the match 22–20 in a close game. 2016 would also prove to be the final year that Parramatta would play at Parramatta Stadium as it was due to be demolished at seasons end to make way for a new 30,000-seat stadium. The final home game played at Parramatta Stadium was against The St. George in front of 13,553 spectators. Parramatta went on to beat St. George 30–18. Parramatta's final game of 2016 saw them travel to New Zealand to play The Auckland Warriors. Parramatta won the match 40–18 with Bevan French scoring 3 tries. At the end of the season, Parramatta finished in 14th place on the ladder but had they not been stripped of the 12 competition points they would have played in the finals. The 2016 season was also difficult for Parramatta as to become salary cap compliant the club needed to release players such as Nathan Peats and Junior Paulo to be able to play for points. Star recruit Kieran Foran who signed only months earlier on a $1 million a year contract also walked out on the club mid-season due to numerous personal problems and off field issues.

The 2017 season saw a major turnaround for the club with Parramatta finishing fourth on the table and making the finals for the first time since 2009. Some of the highlights throughout the year were the club winning nine out of their final ten matches and defeating Brisbane twice including a 52–34 win at Suncorp Stadium and eventual premiers Melbourne. Parramatta then went on to play premiership favorites Melbourne in the first qualifying final, going into the second half Parramatta had stunned everyone by leading the match and it took Melbourne the last play of the game to hold on and win 18–16. The following week, Parramatta played against North Queensland in the sudden death elimination final. Parramatta led 10–6 at halftime but went on to lose the match 24–16 in what would be one of the biggest upsets of the season.

For the 2018 season, Parramatta were predicted by many before the season to finish in the top 8 and challenge for the premiership. Those predictions were matched in the opening round of the season as Parramatta led Penrith 14–0 early on but after a second half capitulation lost the game 24–14. In Round 2, Parramatta were humiliated 54–0 by Manly at Brookvale Oval. Parramatta went on to lose the opening 6 games of the season before eventually winning their first game of the season defeating Manly 44–10 in Round 7. In Round 8, Parramatta defeated Wests 24–22 to make it back to back victories for the club. The Eels then went on to lose the next 5 games in a row before eventually winning their third game of the season defeating North Queensland 20–14 in Darwin in which Jarryd Hayne returned from injury scoring two tries. The following weeks were filled with disappointment as the club came close to pulling off upset wins against top of the table St George only for the club to concede two tries in 5 minutes to lose 20–18 and South Sydney after leading 20–6 late into the game only for The Rabbitohs to score late tries and win 26–20. In Round 18, Parramatta lost 18–16 to Newcastle with The Eels being denied a last minute try after it was ruled winger Bevan French had put his foot over the sideline. The following week, Parramatta defeated arch rivals Canterbury 14–8 in what the media dubbed the "Spoon Bowl". There were hopes that Parramatta could avoid the wooden spoon as going into the second last game of the season the club sat above North Queensland on the table due to for and against. In what was the retiring Jonathan Thurston's final home game, both clubs needed a win to avoid the wooden spoon. North Queensland won the match 44–6. In the final game of the season, Parramatta were defeated 44–10 by the Sydney Roosters ensuring that the club finished last and claimed their 14th wooden spoon and the Roosters claiming the minor premiership. Before the match, the Roosters needed to defeat Parramatta by 27 points to overtake Melbourne and finish first on the table.

Before the start of the 2019 NRL season, Parramatta were predicted by many to finish towards the bottom of the table or claim another wooden spoon. The club started off the year with back to back victories over Penrith and arch rivals Canterbury-Bankstown. In Round 6 of the 2019 NRL season, Parramatta played their first game at the new Western Sydney Stadium against the Wests Tigers and ran out 51–6 winners in front of a sold-out crowd.

In Round 9 against Melbourne, Parramatta suffered one of their worst ever defeats losing 64–10 at Suncorp Stadium. In the aftermath of the defeat, coach Brad Arthur and the players were placed under intense scrutiny but just a week after the loss, Arthur was given a two-year contract extension by the Parramatta board. The club would then go on to lose against North Queensland and last placed Penrith in the coming weeks.

Between Round 12 and Round 22 of the 2019 season, Parramatta would go on to win 8 of their 10 games. In Round 22 against the Gold Coast Titans, Parramatta qualified for the 2019 finals series with a 36–12 victory at Cbus Super Stadium.

At the end of the 2019 regular season, Parramatta finished 5th on the table and qualified for the finals. In the elimination final against Brisbane, Parramatta won the match 58–0 at the new Western Sydney Stadium. The victory was the biggest finals win in history, eclipsing Newtown's 55–7 win over St George in 1944. The match was also Parramatta's biggest win over Brisbane and Brisbane's worst ever loss since entering the competition in 1988. The following week against Melbourne in the elimination semi final, Parramatta were defeated 32–0 at AAMI Park which ended their season. The loss against Melbourne was also the sixth time Parramatta had been defeated by Melbourne in a finals game since 1999.

=== 2020s ===
At the start of the 2020 NRL season, Parramatta won their first five matches in a row which put them at the top of the table. It was the club's best start to a season since 1989. At the end of the 2020 regular season, Parramatta finished in third place on the table and secured a top four spot. It was the club's highest finish on the table since 2005. In the qualifying final, Parramatta led Melbourne 12–0 early on before losing the match 36–24 at Suncorp Stadium. The following week in the elimination final, Parramatta played against South Sydney for the first time in a finals game since 1965. Parramatta led the match 18–8 before a second half capitulation saw them lose 38–24, ending their season.

Parramatta started the 2021 NRL season with four consecutive victories before losing to St. George Illawarra in round 5. They then won the next five matches in a row to sit second on the competition ladder after ten rounds. By round 18, the club sat entrenched within the top four of the competition with a six-point gap ahead of the fifth and sixth placed Sydney Roosters and Manly-Warringah. The club then suffered an end of season slump losing to Canberra, an understrength Sydney Roosters side 28–0 and then two heavy defeats against South Sydney and Manly. Parramatta recovered to defeat North Queensland and then pulled off one of the upsets in 2021, defeating Melbourne 22–10 which ended their 19-game winning streak. Parramatta would end the 2021 regular season in sixth place. In week one against Newcastle in the elimination final, Parramatta won a close match 28–20. The following week, Parramatta lost 8–6 in the lowest scoring match of the year against Penrith in the second week of the finals which ended their season.

Parramatta started the 2022 NRL season winning four of their opening five matches. Throughout the 2022 regular season, Parramatta struggled with consistency. Although they defeated Penrith and Melbourne twice, the club only managed to win more than three games consecutively on two separate occasions and lost to eventual wooden spooners the Wests Tigers in round 6 of the competition. In round 14, Parramatta suffered an embarrassing 34–4 loss against arch-rivals Canterbury who were sitting bottom of the table. In round 22, Parramatta were defeated 26–0 by South Sydney which saw them fall to seventh on the table. However, Parramatta would win their final three games in convincing fashion to finish fourth. In week one of the finals, Parramatta were defeated 27–8 by Penrith before bouncing back the following week against Canberra in the elimination final 40–4 to reach their first preliminary final since 2009. In the preliminary final, Parramatta pulled off one of the biggest upsets in the NRL era defeating North Queensland 24–20 in Townsville to reach the grand final. In the 2022 NRL Grand Final against Penrith, Parramatta trailed 18–0 at half-time before going on to lose 28–12.

Parramatta started the 2023 NRL season with three straight losses, all of which were by four points. In round 1, the club lost in golden point extra-time to Melbourne, followed by a four-point loss to Cronulla and then another defeat against Manly at Brookvale Oval. In round 4, Parramatta defeated back to back premiers Penrith 17–16 in golden point extra-time with Mitchell Moses kicking the winning field goal. Between rounds 12–17, Parramatta recorded five straight victories including an upset victory over South Sydney in round 12. In round 17, the club recorded their highest ever first half score in a game as they led the Dolphins 42–4 at half-time before going on to win 48–20. The victory elevated the club up to fifth place on the table. In round 19, Parramatta suffered their biggest loss of the year losing 46–10 against the New Zealand Warriors with a number of key players missing due to injury and State of Origin selection. All of Parramatta's previous losses in the season were by ten points or less. Following their loss to New Zealand, the club suffered a form slump only winning two of their next six matches which included heavy losses to Melbourne and Brisbane. Parramatta's season was officially ended in round 25 when they lost against the Sydney Roosters 34–12 which meant the club could not make the finals. The following week, Parramatta pulled off one of the biggest upsets in the 2023 season defeating Penrith 32–18. Parramatta would miss out on the top 8 by two points with an eventual finish of 10th place.

Parramatta started the 2024 NRL season with a 26–8 victory over arch-rivals Canterbury. Following the club's round 3 victory over Manly, Parramatta were dealt a huge blow with halfback Mitchell Moses suffering a foot injury which ruled him on indefinitely. In round 4, the club would succumb to an embarrassing defeat against the Wests Tigers who had finished the previous two seasons with the Wooden Spoon. Captain Clint Gutherson had a penalty goal attempt after the full-time siren to win the game which he missed with Wests winning 17–16. In round 7, Parramatta were beaten 44–16 by the Dolphins at TIO Stadium in Darwin. The Dolphins had seven starting players ruled out of the game with injury and head coach Wayne Bennett was also missing due to illness. The score was in favour of Parramatta 8–4 at half-time, however in the second half the club would capitulate conceding eight tries in under 25 minutes. Following the club's 48-16 loss against Melbourne at Magic Round, head coach Brad Arthur was terminated by Parramatta ending his ten-year tenure in charge. Trent Barrett was named as the club's interim head coach for the rest of the 2024 season. On the same day it was reported that Parramatta had been in talks with Wayne Bennett to become the new head coach whilst Arthur was still in charge but Bennett opted to sign a three-year deal with South Sydney. In round 12 of the 2024 NRL season, Parramatta suffered one of their most embarrassing losses in recent times losing 42–26 against South Sydney who were bottom of the table and only had one win to their name prior to the match. Souths also had eight first team players out and had lost their previous six games in a row. On 8 July 2024, the club announced that Jason Ryles would be appointed as the new head coach of the side on a four-year deal starting in 2025. The club would manage to avoid the wooden spoon in the final game of the regular season after defeating the Wests Tigers 60–26 in the "Spoon Bowl" game. Due to other results going their way, Parramatta would finish 15th on the table.

In round 1 of the 2025 NRL season, Parramatta's new era under head coach Jason Ryles got off the worst possible start with the club losing against Melbourne 56–18. Parramatta would go on to lose their opening four matches before securing their first win in round 5 against St. George Illawarra. Towards the back end of the season, Parramatta found themselves sitting 15th on the table and were in danger of claiming the wooden spoon but managed to recover recording impressive wins over the Sydney Roosters and New Zealand Warriors. In the final round of the season, Parramatta recorded a 66-10 victory over wooden spooners Newcastle to finish 11th on the table.

In early 2026, Parramatta won the 2026 NRL Pre-season Challenge competition defeating Cronulla and the Sydney Roosters. In round 1 of the 2026 NRL season, Parramatta lost 52-4 against Melbourne. Parramatta became the first team since the competition began in 1908 to concede 50 points in back to back seasons in round 1. In round 6 of the 2026 NRL season, Parramatta were beaten by the Gold Coast 52-10. It was Parramatta's biggest loss at home for 31 years. The following week however, the club would record one of their most impressive victories over arch-rivals Canterbury winning 38-20 despite having twelve starting players out. Parramatta would finish the 2026 season in a disappointing 13th place on the table. The club had the worst injury toll of any club throughout the year.

== Club identity ==
=== Kit sponsors and manufacturers ===
Year	Kit Manufacturer	Major Sponsor	Back Top Sponsor	Sleeve Sponsor	Back Bottom Sponsor	Front Shorts Sponsor	Back Shorts Sponsor	Chest Sponsor
1976	Westmont	-	-	-	-	-	-	-
1977	Westmont	Dux Hot Water	Dux Hot Water	-	-	-	-	-
1978-80	Westmont	Famous Grouse	Famous Grouse	-	-	-	-	-
1981	Westmont	Hardie's	Hardiflex	-	-	-	-	-
1982	Westmont	Hardie's	Hardiplank	-	-	-	-	-
1983-84	Westmont	James Hardie						
1985-89	Canterbury	James Hardie						
1990-93	Canterbury	James Hardie		2VS				
1994-95	Classic	James Hardie		2VS				
1996	Classic	Parramatta Chrysler Jeep						
1997-99	Classic	Asics		Asics				
2000-02	Classic	Asics		Mortgage House				
2003-04	Classic	Asics		Mounties Group				
2005	Classic	Pirtex		Mounties Group				
2006-07	ISC	Pirtex		Mounties Group				
2008	ISC	Pirtex		Radio Rentals				
2009	ISC	Pirtex		Australian Mortgage Options				
2010	ISC	Pirtex		Pain Away				
2011	ISC	Pirtex		Dyldam				
2012	Burley Sekem	Pirtex		Dyldam				Capital Corporation
2013	X-Blades	Pirtex		Dyldam				UNE
2014-16	X-Blades	Dyldam	UNIBET	Dyldam				NT
2017	X-Blades	PARRA	UNIBET	ALAND				NT
2018-19	ISC	ALAND	ALAND	Actron Air				
2020	ISC	ALAND	ALAND	Actron Air				EK Recruitment
2021-23	Macron	ALAND	ALAND	Actron Air				Lending Association
2024	Macron	ALAND	ALAND	Actron Air				ATS
2025-26	Macron	James Hardie	ALAND	Actron Air				ATS
2027	Adidas	James Hardie	ALAND	Actron Air				ATS

=== Name and emblem ===
Like most NSWRFL clubs founded before the 1980s, Parramatta was established with no official nickname or mascot. The only nickname Parramatta had ever been known by was the "Fruitpickers", a reference to the orchards spread throughout the District and surrounding suburbs in the first half of the 20th century. As the competition and the clubs themselves became more focused on marketing in the 1970s, Parramatta adopted an official club mascot.

In the mid-1960s, Peter Frilingos, a Sydney rugby league journalist, suggested that the club should be known as the "Eels". This reasoning was based on the name of the Parramatta, anglicised from the Aboriginal dialect "Barramattagal" meaning "place where the Eels dwell". After this, the team was commonly called "The Eels" and it became an official nickname in the late 1970s.

As a result, the club's crest was changed in 1980, to a design featuring an eel. This crest remained, despite several changes in jersey design, until a new eel logo was introduced in 2000. In 2004, the club mascot featured on the crest reverted to an eel drawing similar to that featured on the original crest.

Parramatta has also used two separate crests based on Parramatta City's crest. The first was a highly detailed scene showing a typical scene on the foreshore of the Parramatta River in the early days of European settlement. It is an apparent tribute to the District's original occupants, the Barramattagal tribe. In the foreground of the original crest, a male Aboriginal is preparing to spear a fish while a woman in a canoe watches. In the background a paddle steamer is visible as well as the tree-lined banks of the Parramatta River. This crest was used by the club until the 1970s when a more stylised version showing only the hunter, and the club's name on a scroll, was used. This crest is still used in 2006 by the Parramatta District Junior Rugby League Football Club.

In 2009, the Parramatta Eels announced they were returning to their original 1980s club emblem in the 2011 season with the numbers 1947 added, this being the year of conception of the Eels.

=== Colours ===
When a Parramatta District Club was first proposed in 1936, the colours put forward to the New South Wales Rugby League by the District were emerald green and white, as these were the colours worn by the Western Districts President's Cup side and the Western Suburbs Rugby Union Club. However, when the proposal for a Parramatta club was next put to the NSWRL in 1946, the proposed colours for the new District side were blue and gold. These colours are said to have been selected based on the navy blue, sky blue and gold colours used by Arthur Phillip High School. These colours were also adopted by the Parramatta District Rugby Union club in 1936 and also suggested in Parramatta City Council's use of livery of blue and golden-orange in their crest. While this colour scheme has remained consistent throughout the history of the club, the shades of blue and gold have changed several times.

The original Parramatta jersey used in 1947 was of a blue design with a single yellow hoop around the middle of the jersey, extending across the sleeves. This original design was altered in 1949 to a design based on blue and gold hoops and remained unchanged until the 1970s when a jersey comprising stripes on a predominantly blue or gold background was adopted. Over the years, the design has changed gradually from one based on blue and gold stripes to a design incorporating different blue and gold designs around the fringes of a predominantly blue or gold jersey.

=== Primary jerseys ===
Parramatta primary jerseys

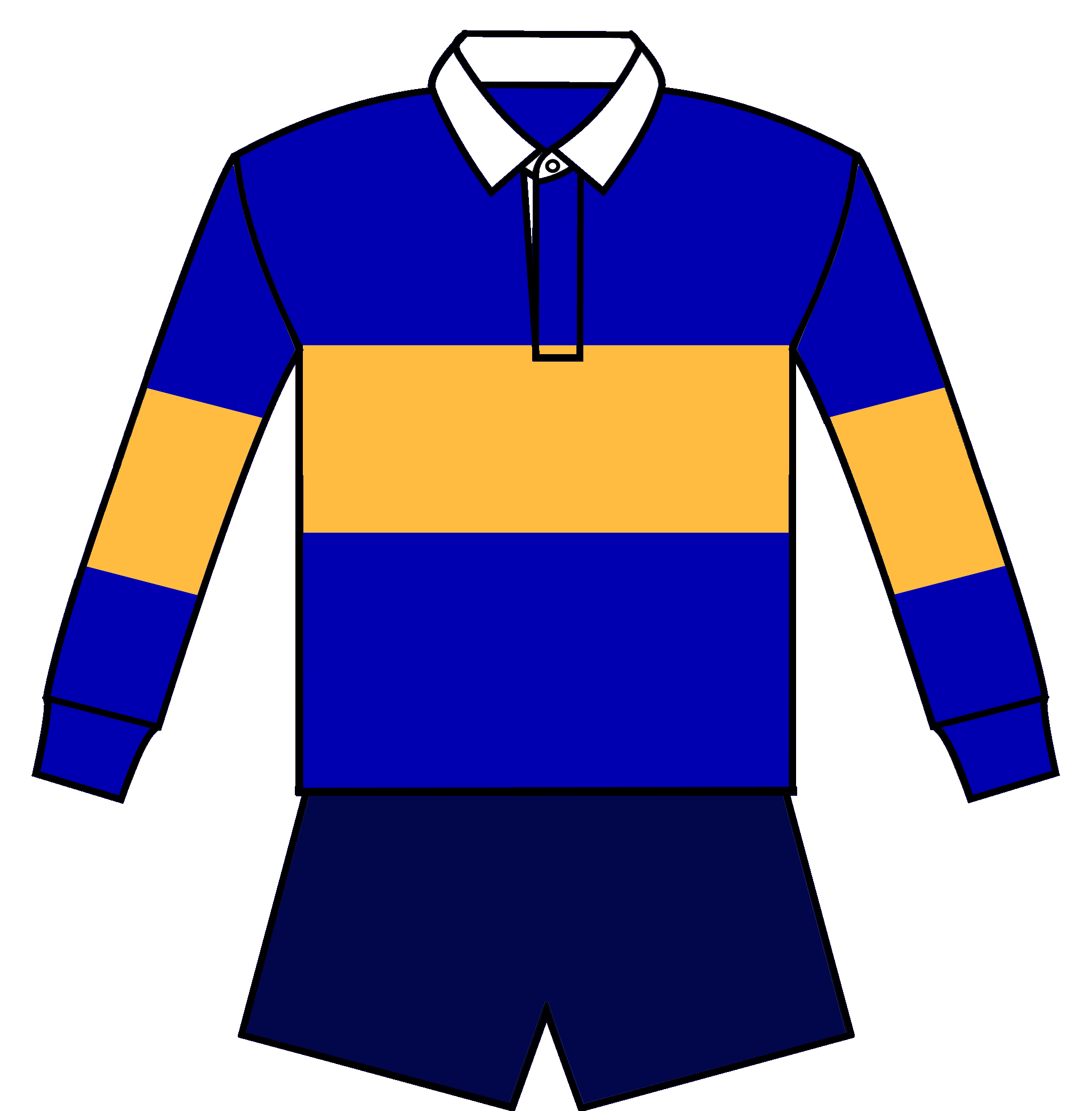
1947

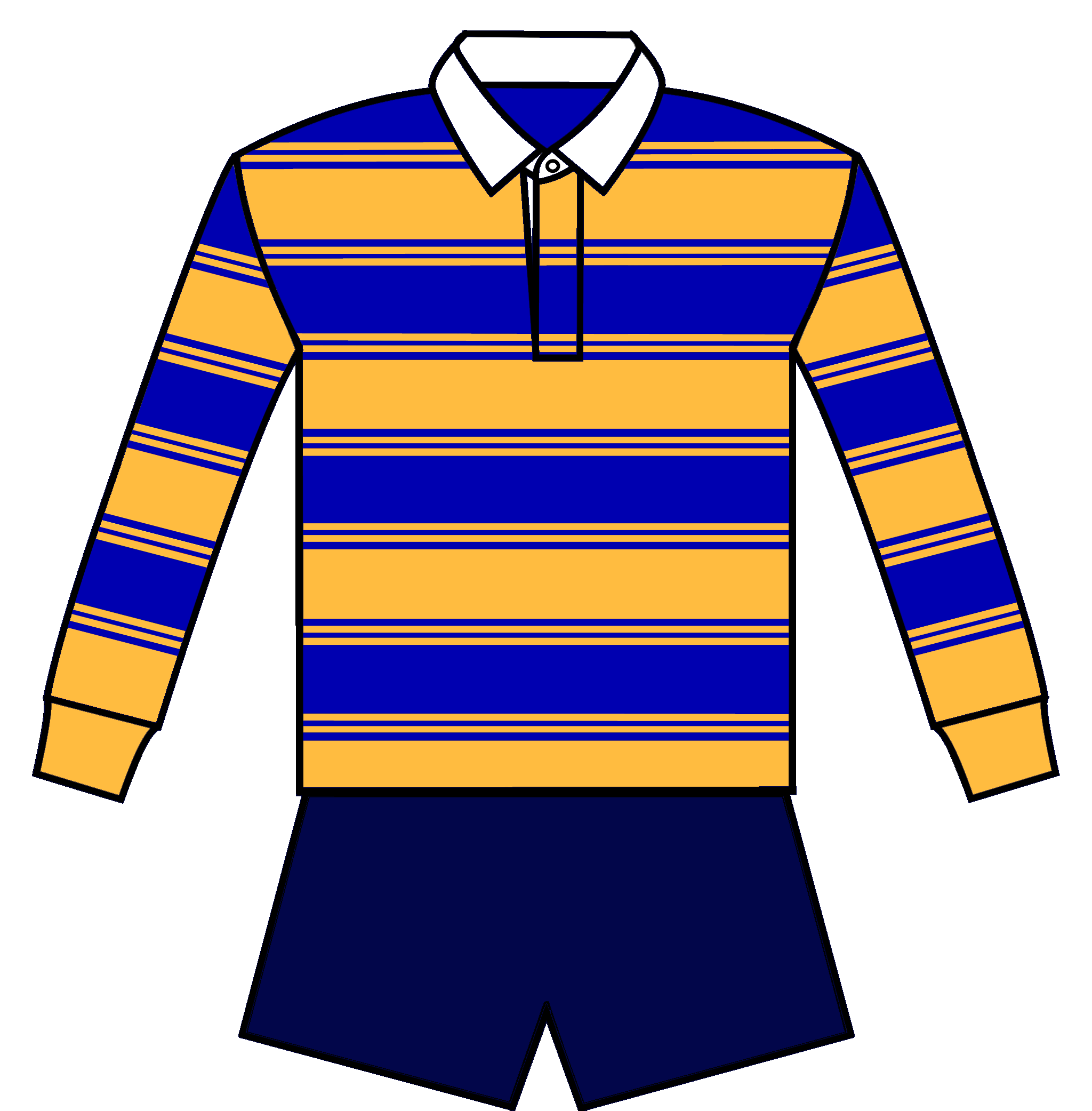
1948–1951

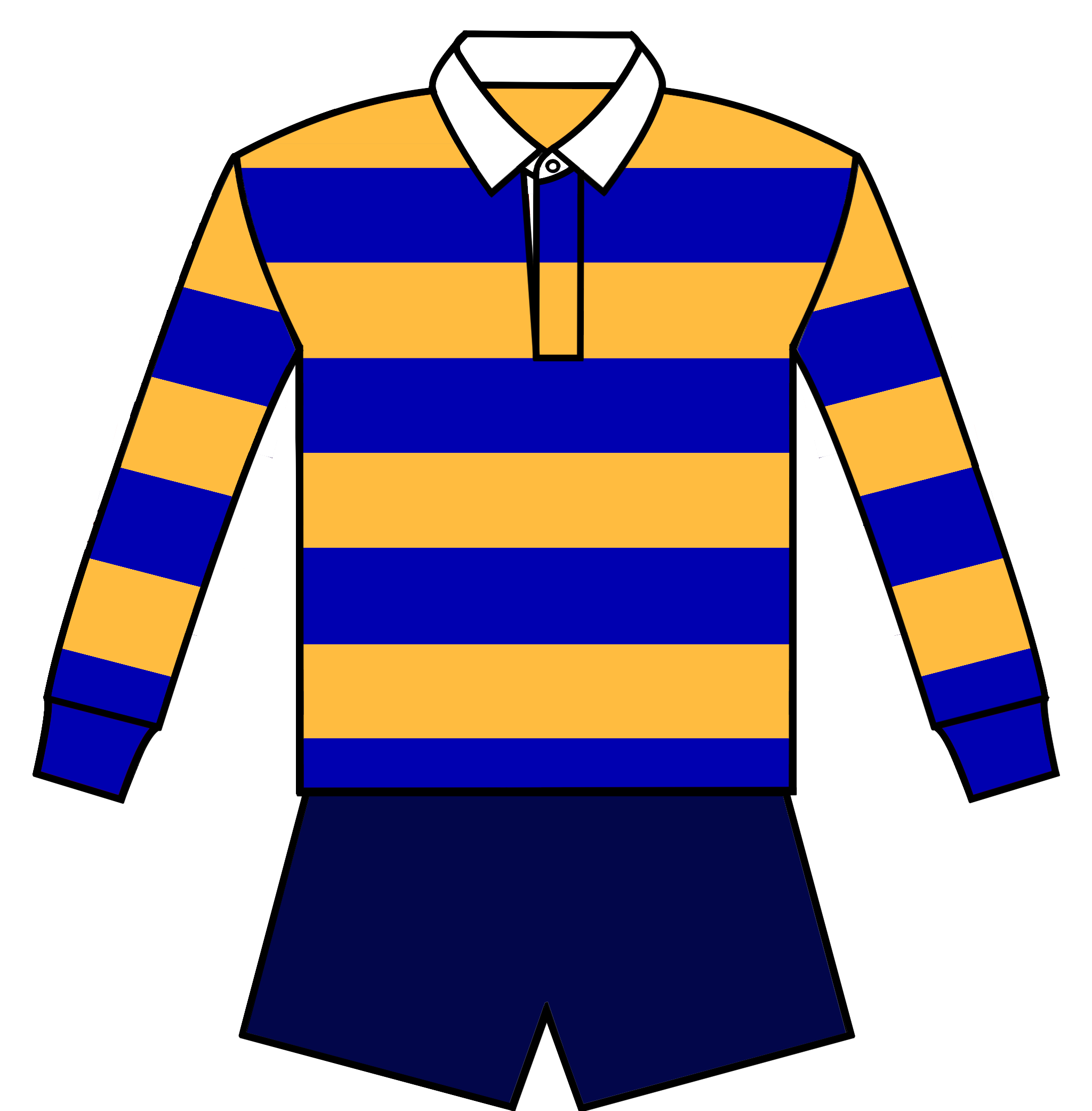
1952

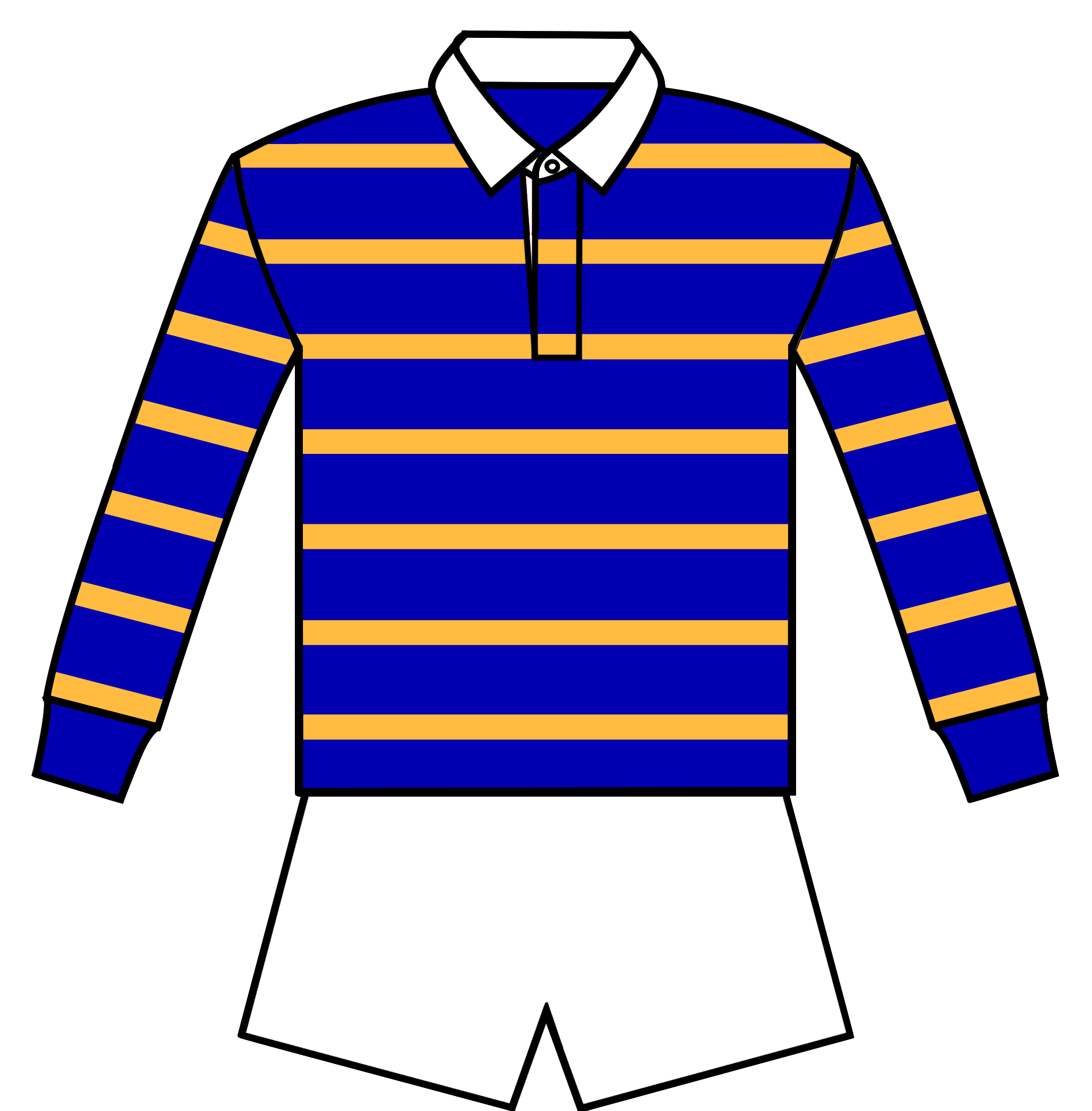
1953–1974

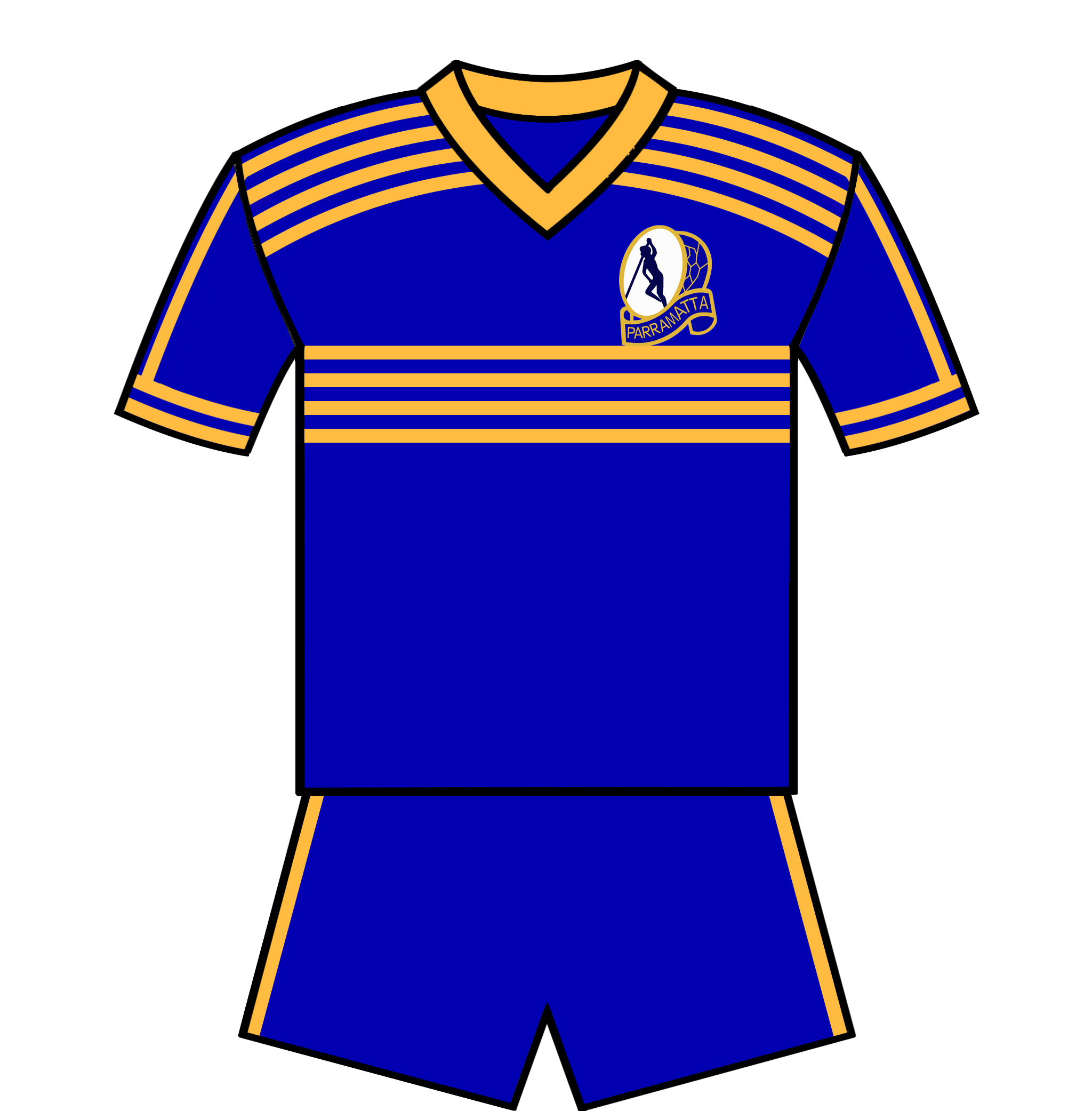
1975

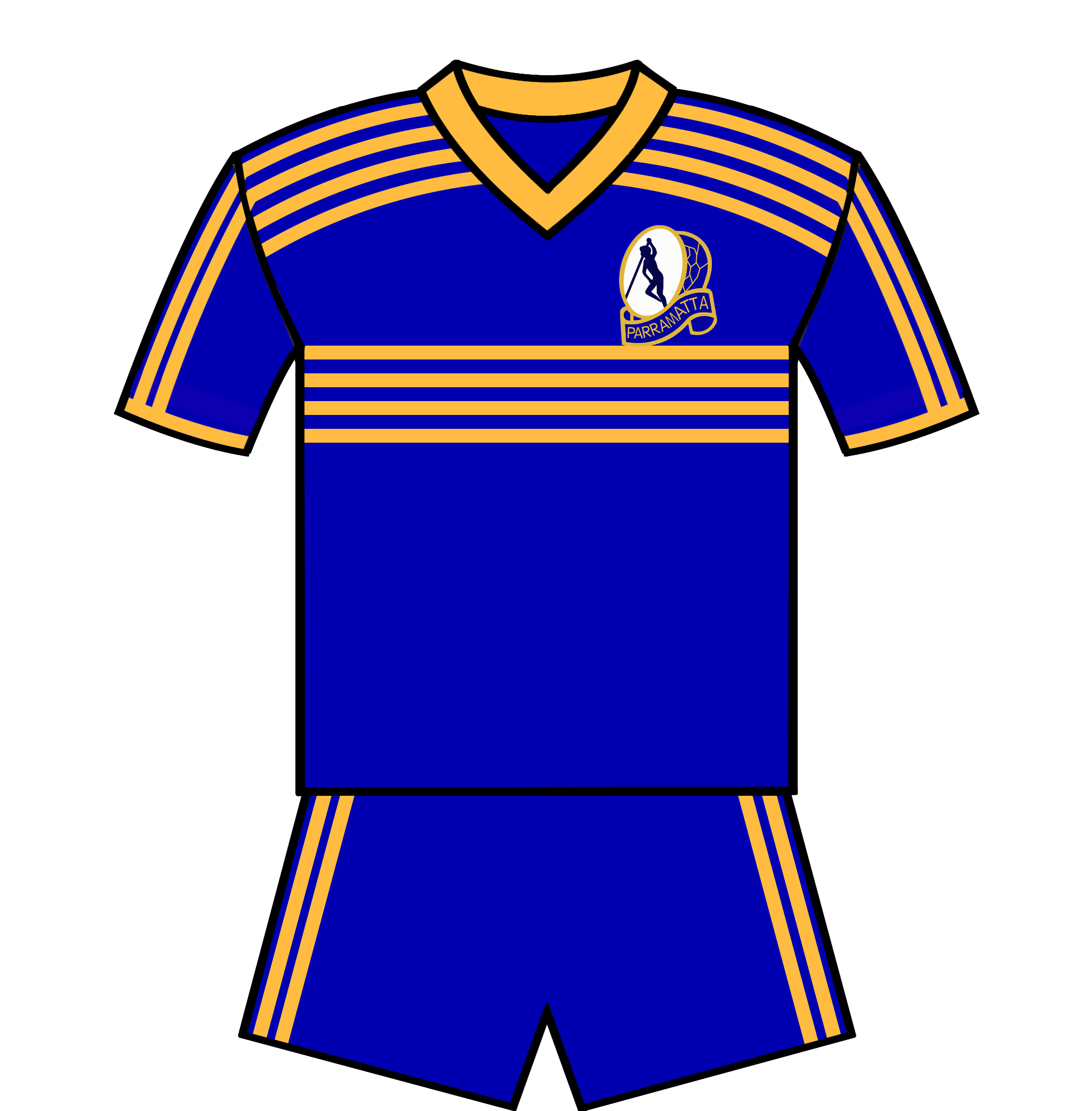
1976–1985

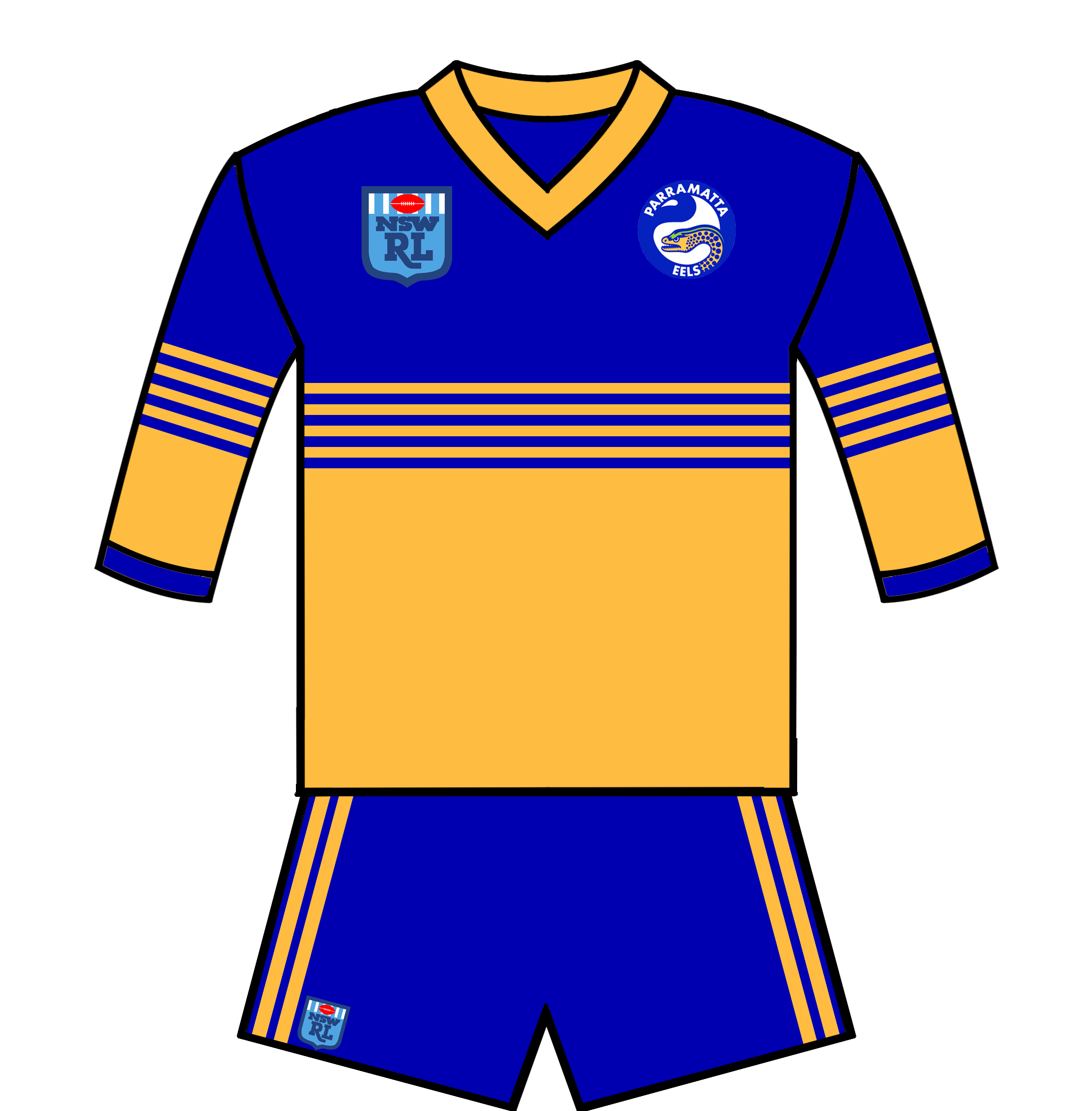
1986–1994

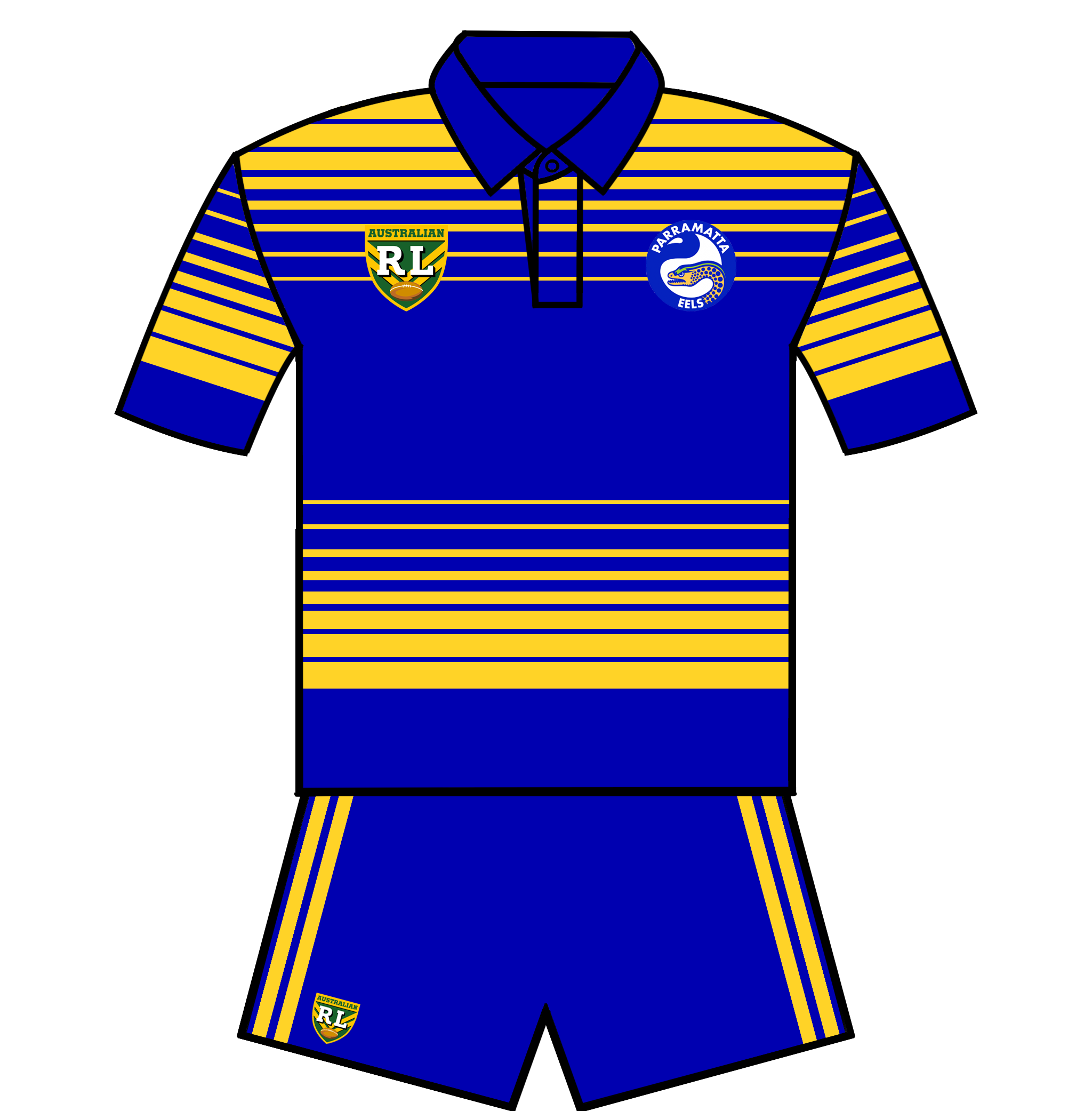
1995–2000

== Stadium ==
Rugby league was played at Cumberland Oval from as early as 1909 by local clubs such as Parramatta Iona, Endeavours and the Western Districts representative side. When the club was admitted into the NSWRL Premiership in 1947, Cumberland Oval became its home ground. The club played its first match in the premiership on 12 April 1947 against Newtown, being defeated 34–12 in front of 6,000 spectators. Cumberland Oval remained the home ground of the Parramatta Eels until 1981; the club played their last match there against the Manly-Warringah Sea Eagles. Later that year, after the Parramatta Eels secured their first-ever Premiership trophy, Eels fans rallied at Cumberland Oval; during the celebrations, fans set fire to the ground's soon-to-be-demolished stand.

From 1982 to 1985, the club used Belmore Oval, home of the Canterbury-Bankstown Bulldogs, as a temporary home ground while a new facility Parramatta Stadium was built. The new stadium to be built on the site of Cumberland Oval was approved by the New South Wales Government for development in 1983 and the contract for the construction and design of the Stadium was put to competitive tender. After construction was completed in November 1985, the club played its first match at the new stadium on 16 March 1986 winning this opening game 36–6 against the St. George Dragons. The original capacity of the ground stood at 30,000, though after re-development of the hills behind each in-goal area into seated terraces in 2002, the capacity was reduced to 21,487.

The largest crowd to watch a rugby league match at Cumberland Oval was 22,470 when the Parramatta took on the South Sydney Rabbitohs on 26 April 1971. The largest crowd at Parramatta Stadium under the current configuration was 21,141 in 2006 against the Wests Tigers. The largest ever attendance for a Parramatta Eels home game came in the stadium's first season when 27,243 saw the Eels draw 12-all with South Sydney in Round 24 of the 1986 NSWRL season. The largest ever rugby league attendance at Parramatta Stadium was set on 6 July 1994 when 27,918 saw Australia defeat France 58–0 in a one-off mid-season Test match. This was also the first test match held in Sydney since 1914 that wasn't played at either the Agricultural Ground, the SCG, or the Sydney Football Stadium.

Parramatta Stadium was closed & demolished in 2017 with Western Sydney Stadium being built in the same location. This stadium has a 30,000 seat capacity and was opened in 2019. The first NRL match to be played at the new venue was in Round 6 2019 between Parramatta and Wests Tigers. Parramatta won the match 51–6 in front of a full house. While CommBank Stadium was under construction, Parramatta played home games at ANZ Stadium between 2017 and the first few rounds of 2019. The Eels currently share a Western Sydney Stadium with many NRL clubs such as the Wests Tigers and arch-rivals Canterbury-Bankstown. Parramatta now play at the 30 000 seated arena of Combank Stadium.

== Rivalries ==
=== Parramatta Eels–Manly-Warringah Sea Eagles rivalry ===
Parramatta has a rivalry with Northern Beaches-based club Manly-Warringah Sea Eagles. Though both clubs were formed in the same year (1947), this rivalry did not develop until the 1970s and 1980s when the clubs faced each other in three grand finals: in 1976, 1982 and 1983. The clubs also competed in several play-off finals matches during this period including a controversial drawn semi-final and subsequent replay in 1978. The famous rivalry between the clubs was also marked in an advertising jingle in a 1970s Tooheys television commercial. The rivalry has been regularly rekindled at various times since, particularly when Parramatta players have transferred to play with Manly. Since their 2005 finals series clash, Parramatta and Manly have not played each other in a finals game since and have not played against each other in a grand final since 1983.

On 18 May 2003, Parramatta and Manly played in the first ever golden point match in NRL history. Manly would win the match 36–34 at Brookvale Oval courtesy of a Ben Walker penalty goal. In round 2 of the 2018 NRL season, Parramatta suffered their worst ever loss to Manly. The game was played in temperatures of nearly 40 degrees where Manly ran out 54-0 winners. In the 2019 NRL season, Parramatta beat Manly in round 25 to take Manly's 5th spot on the ladder and would go on to beat Brisbane 58–0 in the elimination final. The victory is currently the biggest win in finals history. In round 11 of the 2022 NRL season, Manly led Parramatta by ten points in the second half before Parramatta scored two tries to make it 20-20. Parramatta player Mitchell Moses then converted a goal from the side line to win the match 22–20. In round 21 of the 2022 NRL season, the two sides met at Brookvale Oval where Manly needed to defeat Parramatta if they were to stand any chance of reaching the finals. Parramatta would win the game 36–20 with the maligned Jakob Arthur providing two try assists for Parramatta which ended Manly's finals hopes.

Since the 2000s, the rivalry has seen numerous player swaps or players who have featured for both clubs which in the early days was a rare occurrence of the fixture. Such players who have been at both clubs since 2000 include Jamie Lyon, Daniel Heckenberg, Shayne Dunley, Kylie Leuluai, Michael Witt, Aaron Cannings, Jack Afamasaga, Feleti Mateo, Richard Faʻaoso, Blake Green, Joe Galuvao, Tony Williams, Jeff Robson, Jonathan Wright, Justin Horo, Chris Hicks, Cheyse Blair, Darcy Lussick, Kelepi Tanginoa, Brayden Wiliame, Daniel Harrison, William Hopoate, David Gower, Anthony Watmough, Clinton Gutherson, Kieran Foran, Siosaia Vave, Shaun Lane, Andrew Davey, Joey Lussick, Michael Oldfield, Jake Arthur, Morgan Harper and Kelma Tuilagi.

=== Parramatta Eels–Canterbury-Bankstown Bulldogs rivalry ===
The most significant rivalry is with the Canterbury-Bankstown Bulldogs and began in the early days between the two sides. The rivalry grew further during the 1980s when the clubs faced one another in grand finals in 1984 and 1986 as well as regular play-off matches during this period.

This rivalry received renewed impetus during the Super League war when Parramatta recruited four notable Canterbury players.

In 1998, Parramatta and Canterbury played against each other in the preliminary final with the winners to play the Brisbane Broncos in the grand final. Parramatta were leading the match 18–2 with under 10 minutes to play until what happened next can only be described as one of the greatest capitulations in finals history. Canterbury scored three tries in ten minutes and took the game to extra time winning the game 32–20. In the 2005 NRL season, Parramatta recorded the biggest victory between the two clubs when they defeated Canterbury 56–4 at Parramatta Stadium. Parramatta would need to wait nine years to exact their revenge on Canterbury for the 1998 preliminary final when they played in the 2007 elimination final and won the match 25–6. On 15 March 2008, Parramatta came from 20-0 down at half-time against Canterbury to win 28–20. Later in the 2008 NRL season, Parramatta and Canterbury met in round 24 with Canterbury needing to defeat Parramatta in order to avoid the Wooden Spoon. Parramatta would go on to defeat Canterbury-Bankstown 26-12 and condemn them to their fifth spoon.

In 2009 Parramatta faced off against Canterbury in the preliminary final, in front of a record crowd of 74,549. Billed as the "Sydney Grand Final", Parramatta were down 12–6 at halftime but came back in the second half to win 22–12. Parramatta have won 12 of the last 15 meetings with Canterbury since 2015.

Speaking to the Herald Sun in 2007, former Canterbury-Bankstown player Craig Polla-Mounter described the rivalry between the two club's saying "I think the Parramatta and Canterbury fans can be the most unforgiving, especially when we play each other. I have no doubt it is the biggest rivalry in rugby league and part of the reason he didn't play again". Polla-Mounter said this in reference to Parramatta player Paul Carige and his infamous performance in the 1998 preliminary final.

=== Parramatta Eels–Penrith Panthers rivalry ===
Another rivalry is with neighboring Western Sydney club the Penrith Panthers. The match between the two is known as the "Western Sydney derby" or "The Battle of the West". Aside from local 'bragging rights' the rivalry is also partly founded in bitterness associated with the former status of the Penrith district as part of the Parramatta rugby league district. The relationship between local Penrith clubs and the Parramatta District was often problematic; players and officials in the Penrith area considered themselves ignored and neglected by the Parramatta club during the 1950s and 1960s. Parramatta beat Penrith in two finals games in 1985 winning 38-6 and in 2000 when Parramatta won again 28–10. In 2021, Penrith beat Parramatta in a tight and bruising affair 8–6 on their way to winning the 2021 Grand Final.

In round 9 of the 2022 NRL season, Parramatta defeated Penrith 22–20 at Penrith Stadium. This ended Penrith's eight match winning streak to start the season and it was also the first time Penrith had lost at the ground since the 2019 NRL season. In round 20 of the same season, Parramatta defeated Penrith 34–10. Parramatta were the only team in the 2022 NRL season to beat Penrith twice. In the 2022 finals series, Penrith defeated Parramatta 27–8 in the qualifying final. The two clubs would then meet in the 2022 NRL Grand Final with Penrith securing back to back premierships defeating Parramatta 28–12. Following the grand final, some of the Penrith players mocked the Parramatta club in public and on social media with James Fisher-Harris saying that Parramatta were now Penrith's sons followed by the player inviting Penrith supporters to chant "We hate Parra" and Jarome Luai posting on social media "Daddy loves you" which was in reference to Luai saying before the grand final that Penrith were now Parramatta's "Daddy".

In round 4 of the 2023 NRL season, Parramatta met Penrith in the grand final rematch. Parramatta went into the match having started the season winless. Parramatta led the match 16–8 with less than seven minutes to play but Penrith levelled the game at 16-16 after Nathan Cleary kicked a 40-metre field goal with seconds remaining. In golden point extra-time, Mitchell Moses kicked a field goal to win the game for Parramatta 17–16. In the final round of the 2023 NRL season, Parramatta upset Penrith 32–18 with Parramatta winger Maika Sivo scoring four tries. In round 23 of the 2024 NRL season, Penrith staged one of the best comebacks in recent memory as they came from 16 points down to defeat Parramatta 36-34. Penrith scored three converted tries in six minutes to claim the victory.

=== Parramatta Eels–St. George Illawarra Dragons rivalry ===
The Eels did have a rivalry with another Sydney-based team, the St. George Illawarra Dragons. The Eels were the Dragons' first-ever opponents as a joint-venture and the match was also the second ever held at Stadium Australia which would be the venue for the Olympic Games the following year. The Eels won 20-10 but the Dragons later moved on to make the grand final. The rivalry was not based on geographic location or tribalism as it was more based on both teams being in the finals hunt and pursuit of the premiership. In recent years there were some memorable, not to mention controversial matches, including:

- Round 18, 2005: Dragons captain Trent Barrett and Eels hooker PJ Marsh instigated an all-in brawl as Barrett kicked down-field and Marsh attempted to smother his kick. Barrett took exception to the tackle and punched Marsh in the back of the head whilst Eels fullback Wade McKinnon fielded the kick and ran 80 metres to score. It turned out to be the turning point to the match as the Eels would go on to win 40–14.
- Round 13, 2006: After 70 minutes without a score, Parramatta kicked a field goal to go 1-0 up before 8 unanswered points by the Dragons got them home 8–1 in one of the weirdest matches ever in NRL history. This match was played in driving rain at WIN Jubilee Oval, Kogarah.
- Round 26, 2009: With the minor premiership seemingly all but lost, the Dragons thrashed the Eels 37–0 to actually finish on top of the NRL ladder from the Bulldogs who had lost 34–18 against the Wests Tigers in the second match played on the same night as the Dragons vs Eels match. The win by the Dragons ended Parramatta's late season surge and it saw the Eels finish eighth.
- 4th Qualifying Final, 2009: But in the qualifying final nine days later, the Eels turned the tables on the Dragons and beat the premiership favourites 25–12, a 50-point turnaround. The Eels would then go on to make the grand final (which they ultimately lost to the disgraced Melbourne Storm) whilst the Dragons would exit the finals altogether after losing to the Brisbane Broncos 24–10.
- Round 13, 2011: After being thrashed 30–0 against the Dragons in a previous round the Eels began the match as underdogs. The Eels got out to a 14–0 lead only for it to be chased down by the Dragons. After 10 minutes of extra time and neither side being able to break the dead-lock, the game was declared a draw. However, Eels fullback Jarryd Hayne almost pulled off a miracle field goal from close to 60 metres out only for the kick to fade late and miss by half a metre.

=== Parramatta Eels–Melbourne Storm rivalry ===
Parramatta have also developed a rivalry with the Melbourne Storm. After Melbourne were found to have breached the salary cap from 2006 to 2010, Parramatta felt robbed of a premiership, having gone down to Melbourne in the 2009 NRL Grand Final and wanted a chance at redemption. In 2010, Parramatta got this chance.

- Round 13, 2010: After Melbourne were found to have breached the salary cap over the previous five years and robbed several teams of premiership glory including the Parramatta Eels, the Eels got their chance at redemption. In front of a loud and proud home crowd who let Melbourne know what they'd done, Parramatta beat Melbourne, who still had their illegal roster but could no longer accrue points, 24–10. The game was marred by two fights which erupted. The first started after Eels fullback Jarryd Hayne and Melbourne fullback Billy Slater came head to head after Hayne had worked Slater over in a tackle.

Hayne proceeded to head-butt Slater who responded with a punch and the 2 had to be separated. The second occurred again after Hayne and Slater came together. This time Slater was the aggressor and appeared to lead with an elbow when tackling Hayne. Parramatta Five-Eighth Daniel Mortimer was then put in the Sin-Bin for being the third man in. Parramatta fired-up after this incident with prop Fui Fui Moi Moi charging onto the ball from the ensuing penalty and gaining 20 metres. Parramatta kept their heads and won the game by a comfortable margin in the end.

As of 2026, Parramatta has never defeated Melbourne in a finals game having lost all seven encounters in the 1999 preliminary final, 2006 qualifying final, 2007 preliminary final, the 2009 NRL Grand Final, 2017 qualifying final, the 2019 elimination semi final and 2020 qualifying final. Parramatta hold the record as the side who have scored the most points against Melbourne in a single match when they defeated them 54-10 during the 2001 NRL season. In round 24 of the 2021 NRL season, Parramatta defeated Melbourne 22-10 which ended their record equalling 19-game winning streak. Melbourne were only one win from setting an all-time winning streak of 20 victories in a row. Parramatta were the only team to defeat Minor Premiers, Melbourne twice during the 2021 NRL regular season. In round 25 of the 2022 NRL season, Parramatta defeated Melbourne 22–14 to leapfrog them into fourth place on the table. The result meant that Melbourne finished in fifth place, their lowest finish since the 2014 NRL season.

In round 1 of the 2023 NRL season, Parramatta faced Melbourne in a tightly contested season opener that ended with Melbourne's hooker, Harry Grant, scoring a try in the first period of golden point to win the match 16–12. In round 22 of the 2023 NRL season, Melbourne conducted their 25th anniversary celebrations against Parramatta at Docklands Stadium with a promotional poster before the game showing the club had won six premierships including the 2009 premiership even though the NRL had stripped the club of both premierships due to deliberate salary cap breaches between 2006 and 2010. Melbourne would go on to win the game 46–16. On 31 July 2023, former Melbourne player Cameron Smith spoke to the media regarding the celebrations of the stripped premierships stating that people wouldn't understand why the Melbourne club celebrate the stripped premierships and that opposition fans in particular Parramatta supporters had the right to feel annoyed but said the celebration was for all the right reasons.

In 2024, it was announced that assistant Melbourne head coach Jason Ryles would be joining Parramatta to become their new head coach at the start of the 2025 NRL season. In round 1 of the 2025 season, Melbourne defeated Parramatta 56-18 in Ryles first game in charge. In late 2025 and early 2026, Parramatta and Melbourne became involved in a legal battle over player Zac Lomax. Lomax left Parramatta at the end of 2025 citing that he wanted to play in the newly formed Rugby 360 competition despite having three years left on his contract. The contract also stipulated that Lomax was not allowed to play for another NRL team before 2028 without Parramatta's consent. When this competition didn't start, Lomax attempted to return to the NRL and sign a contract with Melbourne. Parramatta then took Lomax to court over the contract dispute with both clubs accusing the other of not being fair or reasonable. On 3 March, Parramatta won their case in the supreme court against Lomax and the Melbourne club. It was then agreed that Lomax was not allowed to sign for any other NRL club until the end of 2028 without Parramatta's consent. Melbourne were also ordered to pay Parramatta $250,000 in legal costs. In round 1 of the 2026 NRL season the two sides met at AAMI Park in Melbourne with Melbourne defeating Parramatta 52-4 which effectively ended their chance of winning the premiership for a second consecutive season. This is due to the 50 point rule in which no team since 1908 has won the premiership after conceding 50 points in a game.

== Players ==
=== Current squad ===
The current playing squad and coaching staff of the Parramatta Eels for the 2026 NRL season.

Parramatta Eels 2026 squad
Top 30 squad - 2026 NRL season			Supplementary list	Coaching staff
Josh Addo-Carr – WG; Tallyn Da Silva – HK; Jack de Belin – LK; Matt Doorey – LK, PR; Charlie Guymer – SR; J'maine Hopgood – PR, LK; Isaiah Iongi – FB; Kitione Kautoga – SR; Brian Kelly – CE, WG; Toni Mataele – SR	Ryan Matterson – SR; Luca Moretti – PR; Mitchell Moses (c) – HB; Joash Papalii – FB; Junior Paulo – PR; Richard Penisini – CE, WG; Will Penisini – CE; Jonah Pezet – FE, HB; Sean Russell – CE; Jordan Samrani – WG, CE	Bailey Simonsson – WG; Ryley Smith – HK; Jake Tago – WG; Kelma Tuilagi – SR; Sam Tuivaiti – PR; Ronald Volkman – FE; Dylan Walker – LK; Jack Williams – PR, SR	Teancum Brown – PR; Jezaiah Funa-Iuta – SR; William Latu – SR; Lorenzo Talataina – FE; Extended squad: Araz Nanva – WG, CE; Saxon Pryke – PR; Apa Twidle – HB	General manager of football: Mark O’Neill; Head coach: Jason Ryles; Assistant coaches: Nathan Brown; Sam Moa; Scott Wisemantel; Legend: (c) Captain(s); (vc) Vice-captain(s); Updated: 20 November 2026; Source(s): Parramatta Eels

=== Notable players ===
In 2002 a team of the greatest Parramatta players, known as the Parramatta Legends, were selected based on a public vote of fans. In August of that year the following players were named in each position:

Parramatta Legends
Backs	Forwards	Coaching staff
1 Ken Thornett – FB; 2 Eric Grothe Sr. – WG; 3 Mick Cronin – CE; 4 Steve Ella – CE; 5 Neville Glover – WG; 6 Brett Kenny – FE; 7 Peter Sterling – HB	8 Bob O'Reilly – PR; 9 Steve Edge – HK; 10 Dean Pay – PR; 11 Dick Thornett – SR; 12 Peter Wynn – SR; 13 Ray Price – LK	Legend: (c) Captain(s); (vc) Vice-captain(s); Updated: 28 August 2002; Source(s): Eels' class of '81 still the fans' favourites, Parramatta Eels Caps

=== Affiliation squads ===
==== Men's Reserves ====
Parramatta Eels – 2026 NSW Cup squad
Squad			Coaching staff
Bradley Avery – FB; Apa Twidle – HB; Samuel Loizou – WG; Araz Nanva – CE; Arthur Miller-Stephen – WG; Lorenzo Talataina – FE; Max Tupou – PR	Teancum Brown – PR; Kruz Niutili-Schmidt – HK; Meni Luke – HK; Will Latu – SR; Jezaiah Funa-Iuta – SR; Saxon Pryke – LK	Damascus Neemia; Jeshua Maa-Nelson; Zack Visconti	Head coach: Nathan Cayless; Legend: (c) Captain(s); (vc) Vice-captain(s); Updated: 20 November 2026; Source(s): Parramatta Eels

==== Men's Under-21 ====
Parramatta Eels – 2026 Jersey Flegg Cup squad
Squad			Coaching staff
Jireh-Trey Stewart – FB; Talen Risati – WG; Maison Ong – WG; Christopher Moala – CE; Coby Raven – CE; Cobi McCloskey – HB; Ryda Talagi – FE; Jackson Koina – HK; Cyrus Bloomfield – PR; Kordell Pritchard – PR	Lorima Rokosuka – PR; Lincoln Fletcher – SR; Oliver Walker – SR; Nathan Howlett – CE; Cameron Bamblett – WG; Epapara Tahu-Apiata – WG	Riley Davis; Steven Nunn; Wesley Pakoti	Head coach: Jordan Rankin; Legend: (c) Captain(s); (vc) Vice-captain(s); Updated: 20 November 2026; Source(s): Parramatta Eels

==== Men's Under-19 ====
Parramatta Eels – 2026 S.G. Ball Cup squad
Squad			Coaching staff
Billy Fanene – PR; Cameron Bamblett – WG; Christopher Moala – CE; Christopher Petrus – PR; Cobi McCloskey – HB; Coby Raven – FE; Cyrus Bloomfield – SR; Dru Faletolu – LK; Epapara Tahu-Apiata – WG; Jackson Koina – HK	Jireh-Trey Stewart – FB; Kordell Pritchard – PR; Lachlan Vella – CE; Lincoln Fletcher – SR; Maison Ong – WG; Michael Nauer – HB; Nathan Howlett – CE; Lorima Rokosuka – PR	Ryda Talagi; Samuel Polley; Samuela Sorovi	Head coach: Mitch Lewis; Legend: (c) Captain(s); (vc) Vice-captain(s); Updated: 20 November 2026; Source(s): Parramatta Eels

==== Men's Under-16 ====
Parramatta Eels – 2026 Harold Matthews Cup squad
Squad			Coaching staff
Danny Abuhamed – FB; Ali Sabra – WG; Christopher Suaalii – CE; Curtis Brown – HB; Caleb Leiataua – PR; Deon Haynes – SR; Divine Taulafo – PR; Elijah Alhazim – CE; Flynn Manu'a – LK; Hayden Bell – WG	Jake Capovilla – HK; Jayden Tapuai – FE; Khan Jackson – PR; Leonard Salter – SR; Levi Perrett – WG; Liam Martin – CE; Lorima Ravouvou Seuseu – PR; Nixon O’Connor – HB	Riley Paki; Spencer Sorensen; Tyson Puleitu	Head coach: Josh Hodgson; Legend: (c) Captain(s); (vc) Vice-captain(s); Updated: 20 November 2026; Source(s): Parramatta Eels

== Coaches ==
The first grade Parramatta Eels team has been coached by 30 different coaches since foundation.

- Frank McMillan (1947)
- Vic Hey (1948–1953)
- Charlie Gill (1954)
- Johnny Slade (1955)
- Cec Fifield (1956)
- Ken Slattery (1957)
- Jack Rayner (1958–1960)
- Ron Boden (1961)
- Ken Kearney (1962–1964)
- Ken Thornett (1965–1966)
- Brian Hambly (1967)
- Ian Johnston (1968–1969)
- Ron Lynch (1970)
- Ian Walsh (1971–1972)
- Dave Bolton (1973–1974)
- Norm Provan (1975)
- Terry Fearnley (1976–1979)
- John Peard (1980)
- Jack Gibson (1981–1983)
- John Monie (1984–1989)
- Mick Cronin (1990–1993)
- Ron Hilditch (1994–1996)
- Brian Smith (1997–2006)
- Jason Taylor (2006)
- Michael Hagan (2007–2008)
- Daniel Anderson (2009–2010)
- Stephen Kearney (2011–2012)
- Ricky Stuart (2013)
- Brad Arthur (2012, 2014–2024)
- Trent Barrett (2024)
- Jason Ryles (2025)

== Supporters ==
At the end of the 2023 NRL season, Parramatta had the most NRL membership numbers out of the nine Sydney clubs in the competition with 35,015 paying members.

Some of the club's notable supporters include:

- Sean Abbott, Australian cricketer
- John Afoa, New Zealand rugby union footballer
- Simon Baker, Australian actor
- Katherine Bates, Australian track and road cyclist
- Bruce Beresford, Australian film director
- Toni Collette, Australian actress
- Shaun Diviney, Australian musician
- Greg Dyer, Former Australian cricketer
- Joel Edgerton, Australian actor
- Jon English, English-Australian musician and actor
- Danny Green, professional Australian boxer
- Nicholas Hamilton, Australian actor
- Paul Hogan, Australian actor and comedian
- Darren Lehmann, former Australian cricketer
- Ian Leslie, Indonesian-Australian journalist and television host
- Aaron Mooy, Australian association football player
- Melanie McLaughlin, Australian sport presenter
- Sam Naismith, AFL footballer
- Tex Perkins, Australian musician
- Simon Pryce, Australian performer in The Wiggles
- Nathan Rees, 41st Premier of New South Wales
- Mathew Ryan, Australian association football player
- Gurinder Sandhu, Australian cricketer
- Dani Samuels, Australian Olympian
- Jordan Silk, Australian cricketer
- Daryl Somers, Australian television presenter

== Statistics and records ==
=== Individual records ===
Most appearances (200+)

1. Nathan Hindmarsh (330) from 1998 to 2012
2. Brett Kenny (265) from 1980 to 1993
3. Luke Burt (264) from 1999 to 2012
4. Nathan Cayless (259) from 1997 to 2010
5. Ray Price (258) from 1976 to 1986
6. Tim Mannah (233) from 2009 to 2019
7. Peter Sterling (227) from 1978 to 1992
8. Junior Paulo (223*) from 2013 to 2026
9. Bob O'Reilly (216) from 1967 to 1982
10. Mick Cronin (216) from 1977 to 1986
11. Clinton Gutherson (206) from 2016 to 2024
12. Mark Laurie (205) from 1982 to 1992
13. Daniel Wagon (204) from 1999 to 2008
14. Fuifui Moimoi (201) from 2004 to 2014

Scoring records

Mick Cronin holds the record for most points scored across all grades (2,001) between 1977 and 1986. Cronin also holds the record for most points scored in a single season (282) in 1978. Luke Burt holds the record for most First Grade tries (111) between 1999 and 2012.

Parramatta's largest victory was a 74 - 4 win over Cronulla-Sutherland Sharks on 23 August 2003 at Parramatta Stadium. The club's largest defeat was a 0 - 68 loss to Canberra Raiders on 22 August 1993 at Canberra Stadium.

Attendances

The largest crowd Parramatta has played before was 104,583 at Telstra Stadium in the Round 1 'doubleheader' in 1999. The largest home crowd at Parramatta Stadium, before the construction of the hill terraces, was 27,243 against South Sydney Rabbitohs on 17 August 1986. The record crowd Parramatta has played in front of at the new Western Sydney Stadium is 29,372. In this match, Parramatta defeated Brisbane 58–0 in week one of the 2019 finals series. It is the biggest winning margin in a finals match since the competition began in 1908.

== Head-to-head records ==
Opponent	Played	Won	Drawn	Lost	Win %
Tigers	50	31	1	18	62.00
Warriors	46	27	0	19	58.70
Panthers	113	62	1	50	54.87
Dragons	44	24	2	18	54.55
Cowboys	49	26	1	22	53.06
Titans	27	14	0	13	51.85
Knights	61	29	1	31	47.54
Raiders	67	31	0	36	46.27
Sharks	93	43	0	50	46.24
Roosters	142	65	5	72	45.77
Bulldogs	158	72	5	81	45.57
Broncos	68	29	1	38	42.65
Rabbitohs	137	56	3	78	40.88
Sea Eagles	153	59	4	90	38.56
Storm	48	18	0	30	37.50
Dolphins	3	1	0	2	33.33

=== All time match record ===
The all time playing record for the Parramatta team since 1947 (including finals).

Games	Wins	Draw	Losses	Win %	Correct to
1781	827	38	921	46.54%	21 April 2025

=== Finals appearances ===
31 (1962, 1963, 1964, 1965, 1971, 1975, 1976, 1977, 1978, 1979, 1981, 1982, 1983, 1984, 1985, 1986, 1997, 1998, 1999, 2000, 2001, 2002, 2005, 2006, 2007, 2009, 2017, 2019, 2020, 2021, 2022)

== Honours ==
=== First-grade ===
- New South Wales Rugby League, Australian Rugby League and National Rugby League Premierships: 4

1981, 1982, 1983, 1986

- Premiership runners-up: 6

1976, 1977, 1984, 2001, 2009*, 2022

- New South Wales Rugby League, Australian Rugby League and National Rugby League Minor Premierships: 5

1977, 1982, 1986, 2001, 2005

- Mid-week cup: 2

1980, 1986

- Rugby League World Sevens: 2

1997, 2003

- NRL Nines: 1

2016*

- Bandaged Bear Cup (Vs Bulldogs): 4

2007, 2008, 2009, 2010

- I4Give Foundation Cup (Vs Bulldogs): 1

2023

- Jack Gibson Cup (Vs Roosters): 5

2008, 2012, 2014, 2016, 2022

- Johnny Mannah Cup (Vs Sharks): 6

2013, 2014, 2019, 2020, 2021, 2024

=== Youth and pre-season ===
- First Division, Premier League: 9

1975, 1977, 1979, 1997, 1999, 2005, 2006, 2007, 2008 (as Wentworthville Magpies)

- New South Wales Rugby League Club Championships: 18

1976, 1977, 1978, 1979, 1980, 1981, 1982, 1986, 1997, 1998, 1999, 2000, 2001, 2002, 2003, 2005, 2008, 2025

- Pre-Season Cup/Challenge Titles: 2

1975, 2026

- Jersey Flegg Cup: 3

1970, 1985, 1990

- SG Ball Cup: 14

1966, 1967, 1968, 1973, 1983, 1985, 1987, 1988, 1991, 1993, 1999, 2007, 2017, 2023

- Harold Matthews Cup: 20

1970, 1971, 1972, 1975, 1976, 1981, 1982, 1986, 1988, 1990, 1994, 1997, 1998, 1999, 2003, 2004, 2008, 2012, 2013, 2016

- Mills Cup: 2

2007, 2008

== Women's team ==
=== Current squad ===
The current playing squad and coaching staff of the Parramatta Eels for the 2023 NRL Women's season as of 18 June 2023.

Parramatta Eels
First grade squad			Coaching staff
Elsie Albert – PR; Tyla Amiatu – PR; Rosemarie Beckett – FB; Pihuka Berryman-Duff – FB; Kennedy Cherrington (c) – PR, SR; Rueben Cherrington – HB, HK, LK; Abbi Church – CE, FB; Kelsey Clark – SO	Nakia Davis-Welsh – FB, WG; Monique Donovan – CE, WG; Zali Fay – WG; Jade Fonua – LK; Kimberley Hunt – CE; Madeline Jones – LK, PR; Ruby-Jean Kennard – PR; Amelia Mafi – PR	Mahalia Murphy – CE; Shannon Muru – SR; Talesha O'Neill – SR; Capri Paekau – HK; Rachael Pearson – HB; Kyra Simon – PR; Shontelle Stowers – CE; Cassey Tohi-Hiku – CE, WG	Head coach: Dean Widders; Legend: (c) Captain(s); (vc) Vice-captain(s); Updated: 18 June 2023; Source(s): Eels Team Profiles
