= 2020 Cronulla-Sutherland Sharks season =

- NRL Rank: 8th
- Play-off result: Elimination Finalist
- 2020 record: Wins: 10; draws: 0; losses: 10
- Points scored: For: 480; against: 480

Team information
- CEO: Dino Mezzatesta
- Coach: John Morris
- Assistant coach: Dave Howlett & Craig Sandercock
- Captain: Wade Graham (19 games) Shaun Johnson (2 games)
- Stadium: Netstrata Jubilee Stadium → Bankwest Stadium

Top scorers
- Tries: Sione Katoa (16)
- Goals: Shaun Johnson (56)
- Points: Shaun Johnson (120)
← 2019	2021 →

The 2020 Cronulla-Sutherland Sharks season was the 54th in the club's history. The team was coached by John Morris and captained by Wade Graham. The team competed in the National Rugby League's 2020 Telstra Premiership. This season marked the first since 2001 without club legend Paul Gallen, who retired at the end of the 2019 season.

== Milestones ==
- Round 1: Connor Tracey made his debut for the club, after previously playing for the South Sydney Rabbitohs.
- Round 1: Toby Rudolf made his NRL debut for the club.
- Round 2: Billy Magoulias scored his 1st career try.
- Round 3: William Kennedy scored his 1st career try.
- Round 4: Siosifa Talakai made his debut for the club, after previously playing for the South Sydney Rabbitohs.
- Round 5: Mawene Hiroti scored his 1st try for the club.
- Round 6: Royce Hunt made his debut for the club, after previously playing for the Canberra Raiders.
- Round 8: Royce Hunt scored his 1st career try.
- Round 9: Nene Macdonald made his debut for the club, after previously playing for the North Queensland Cowboys and scored his 1st try for the club.
- Round 11: Teig Wilton made his NRL debut for the club.
- Round 12: Aaron Woods played his 200th career game.
- Round 12: Jackson Ferris made his NRL debut and scored his 1st career try for the club.
- Round 12: Braydon Trindall made his NRL debut for the club.
- Round 12: Siosifa Talakai scored his 1st try for the club.
- Round 12: Connor Tracey scored his 1st career try.
- Round 13: Josh Dugan played his 200th career game.
- Round 13: Jesse Ramien played his 50th career game.
- Round 13: Wade Graham played his 200th game for the club.
- Round 14: Matt Moylan kicked his 1st goal for the club.
- Round 16: Braydon Trindall kicked his 1st career goal.
- Round 17: Josh Dugan played his 50th game for the club.
- Round 17: Bryson Goodwin kicked his 1st goal for the club.
- Round 18: Toby Rudolf scored his 1st career try.
- Round 19: Sione Katoa kicked his 1st career goal.
- Round 20: Daniel Vasquez made his NRL debut for the club.
- Round 20: Mawene Hiroti kicked his 1st career goal.

== Harvey Norman Women's Premiership ==
=== Regular season ===
Date	Round	Opponent	Venue	Result	Score	Tries	Goals	Field Goals	Report
19 July	1	Wentworthville Magpies	Ringrose Park, Sydney	Win	28-14	Robinson (2), Cherrington, Cowan, Penitani	Studdon 4/5		
Team Details: FB / 1 / Tiana Penitani; WG / 2 / Andie Robinson; CE / 3 / Jaime Chapman; CE / 4 / Kiana Takairangi; WG / 5 / Lynda Howarth; FE / 6 / Corban McGregor (c); HB / 7 / Maddie Studdon; PR / 8 / Georgie Brooker; HK / 9 / Keeley Davis; PR / 10 / Analei Netzler; SR / 11 / Georgia Page; SR / 12 / Talei Holmes; LK / 13 / Kaarla Cowan; Interchange: IC / 14 / Jade Etherden; IC / 16 / Brandi-Lee Stainton Payne; IC / 17 / Kennedy Cherrington; IC / 18 / Tia Hinds; Reserves: RE / 19 / Zali Fay; Coach: / / Glenn Brailey
25 July	2	North Sydney Bears	Cronulla High School, Sydney	Win	18-10	Penitani, McGregor, Metzler, Chapman	McGregor 1/4		
Team Details: FB / 1 / Tiana Penitani; WG / 2 / Andie Robinson; CE / 3 / Jaime Chapman; CE / 4 / Kiana Takairangi; WG / 5 / Lynda Howarth; FE / 6 / Corban McGregor (c); HB / 9 / Keeley Davis; PR / 8 / Georgie Brooker; HK / 20 / Jade Etherden; PR / 10 / Analei Netzler; SR / 11 / Georgia Page; SR / 12 / Talei Holmes; LK / 13 / Kaarla Cowan; Interchange: IC / 14 / Jamie-Anne Wright; IC / 15 / Tegan Dymock; IC / 17 / Kennedy Cherrington; IC / 18 / Tia Hinds; Reserves: RE / 7 / Maddie Studdon; RE / 19 / Zali Fay; Coach: / / Glenn Brailey
	3	Bye							
8 August	4	South Sydney Rabbitohs	Cronulla High School, Sydney	Win	16-0	Fay (2), Robinson, Holmes	Studdon 0/4		
Team Details: FB / 1 / Jaime Chapman; WG / 2 / Andie Robinson; CE / 3 / Jamie-Anne Wright; CE / 4 / Kiana Takairangi; WG / 5 / Zali Fay; FE / 6 / Corban McGregor (c); HB / 7 / Maddie Studdon; PR / 8 / Analei Netzler; HK / 9 / Keeley Davis; PR / 10 / Georgie Brooker; SR / 15 / Jade Etherden; SR / 12 / Georgia Page; LK / 13 / Kaarla Cowan; Interchange: IC / 14 / Tia Hinds; IC / 16 / Kennedy Cherrington; IC / 17 / Tegan Dymock; IC / 18 / Lavinia Taukamo; Reserves: RE / 11 / Talei Holmes; Coach: / / Glenn Brailey
15 August	5	Wests Tigers	Cronulla High School, Sydney	Win	16-4	Fay, Chapman, Wright, Takairangi	Studdon 0/4		
Team Details: FB / 1 / Jaime Chapman; WG / 2 / Andie Robinson; CE / 3 / Jamie-Anne Wright; CE / 4 / Kiana Takairangi; WG / 5 / Zali Fay; FE / 6 / Corban McGregor (c); HB / 7 / Maddie Studdon; PR / 8 / Georgie Brooker; HK / 9 / Keeley Davis; PR / 10 / Analei Netzler; SR / 11 / Georgia Page; SR / 12 / Talei Holmes; LK / 13 / Kaarla Cowan; Interchange: IC / 15 / Lavinia Taukamo; IC / 18 / Ariel George; IC / 20 / Brandi-Lee Stainton Payne; IC / 21 / Emma Walters; Reserves: RE / 14 / Tegan Dymock; RE / 17 / Kennedy Cherrington; RE / 19 / Tia Hinds; Coach: / / Glenn Brailey
22 August	6	Central Coast Roosters	Cronulla High School, Sydney	Loss	22-6	Davis	Studdon 1/1		
Team Details: FB / 1 / Jaime Chapman; WG / 2 / Andie Robinson; CE / 3 / Jamie-Anne Wright; CE / 4 / Kiana Takairangi; WG / 5 / Zali Fay; FE / 6 / Corban McGregor (c); HB / 7 / Maddie Studdon; PR / 8 / Georgie Brooker; HK / 9 / Keeley Davis; PR / 17 / Kennedy Cherrington; SR / 11 / Georgia Page; SR / 12 / Talei Holmes; LK / 13 / Kaarla Cowan; Interchange: IC / 10 / Oneata Schwalger; IC / 14 / Tegan Dymock; IC / 15 / Lavinia Taukamo; IC / 19 / Emma Walters; Reserves: RE / 16 / Brandi-Lee Stainton Payne; Coach: / / Glenn Brailey
29 August	7	Canterbury-Bankstown Bulldogs	Hammondville Oval, Sydney	Win	14-8	Cherrington, Holmes, Wright	Studdon 1/3		
Team Details: FB / 1 / Andie Robinson; WG / 19 / Alexandra Weir; CE / 3 / Jamie-Anne Wright; CE / 4 / Talei Holmes; WG / 5 / Zali Fay; FE / 6 / Corban McGregor (c); HB / 7 / Maddie Studdon; PR / 8 / Georgie Brooker; HK / 9 / Keeley Davis; PR / 14 / Tegan Dymock; SR / 11 / Georgia Page; SR / 12 / Kennedy Cherrington; LK / 13 / Kaarla Cowan; Interchange: IC / 2 / Emma Walters; IC / 15 / Lavinia Taukamo; IC / 16 / Brandi-Lee Stainton Payne; IC / 18 / Ariel George; Reserves: RE / 10 / Oneata Schwalger; RE / 17 / Tia Hinds; Coach: / / Glenn Brailey

=== Finals series ===
Date	Round	Opponent	Venue	Result	Score	Tries	Goals	Field Goals	Report
	1	Bye							
12 September	2	Central Coast Roosters	Campbelltown Sports Stadium, Sydney	Loss	12-13	McGregor, Fay	Studdon 2/2		
Team Details: FB / 1 / Jaime Chapman; WG / 2 / Andie Robinson; CE / 3 / Jamie-Anne Wright; CE / 5 / Zali Fay; WG / 17 / Lynda Howarth; FE / 6 / Corban McGregor (c); HB / 7 / Maddie Studdon; PR / 8 / Georgie Brooker; HK / 9 / Keeley Davis; PR / 10 / Analei Netzler; SR / 11 / Talei Holmes; SR / 12 / Kennedy Cherrington; LK / 13 / Kaarla Cowan; Interchange: IC / 14 / Tegan Dymock; IC / 15 / Jade Etherden; IC / 18 / Lavinia Taukamo; IC / 20 / Tia Hinds; Reserves: RE / 4 / Kiana Takairangi; RE / 16 / Brandi-Lee Stainton Payne; Coach: / / Glenn Brailey
19 September	3	North Sydney Bears	Leichhardt Oval, Sydney	Loss	10-16	Cherrington, Robinson	Studdon 1/2		
Team Details: FB / 1 / Jaime Chapman; WG / 2 / Andie Robinson; CE / 3 / Jamie-Anne Wright; CE / 5 / Zali Fay; WG / 17 / Lynda Howarth; FE / 6 / Corban McGregor (c); HB / 7 / Maddie Studdon; PR / 8 / Georgie Brooker; HK / 9 / Keeley Davis; PR / 12 / Kennedy Cherrington; SR / 11 / Talei Holmes; SR / 15 / Georgia Page; LK / 13 / Kaarla Cowan; Interchange: IC / 10 / Analei Netzler; IC / 14 / Tegan Dymock; IC / 18 / Lavinia Taukamo; IC / 19 / Jade Etherden; Reserves: RE / 4 / Kiana Takairangi; RE / 19 / Tia Hinds; Coach: / / Glenn Brailey

- At the end of Round 1, the NSWRL announced the immediate suspension of the Harvey Norman Women's Premiership due to the COVID-19 pandemic. It was later announced that the season would resume and the competition restarted from 18 July.

== Jersey Flegg Cup (U20) ==
=== Regular season ===
Date
Round
Opponent
Venue
Result
Score
Tries
Goals
Field Goals
Report
15 March
1
South Sydney Rabbitohs
Redfern Oval, Sydney
Loss
30-32
Pele (2), Lualua, Talagi, Longmuir
Broadhurst 5/5

Team Details

FB	1	Jonaiah Lualua
WG	2	Eliah Veikoso
CE	3	James Coyne
CE	4	Vito Tevaga
WG	5	Marco Talagi
FE	6	Kai Broadhurst
HB	7	Angus Ernst
PR	8	Franklin Pele
HK	9	Isaac Longmuir (c)
PR	10	Jesse Colquhoun
SR	11	Kai Parker
SR	12	Jack Boyling (c)
LK	13	Damon Smith
Interchange:
IC	14	Thomas Giles
IC	15	Elijah Ieriko
IC	16	Nic Barlow
IC	18	Kyle Pickering
Reserves:
RE	17	Rhys Dakin
RE	19	Zane Jegers
RE	20	Kane Ball
Coach:		Daniel Holdsworth

- On 27 March, the 2020 Jersey Flegg Cup was cancelled due to the COVID-19 pandemic.

== Canterbury Cup NSW (Newtown Jets) ==
=== Regular season ===
Date
Round
Opponent
Venue
Result
Score
Tries
Goals
Field Goals
Report
15 March
1
South Sydney Rabbitohs
Metricon High Performance Centre, Sydney
Win
32-12
Hunt, Demetriou, Ferris, Milne, Wilton
Trindall 6/6

Team Details

FB	1	Tyla Tamou
WG	2	Jackson Ferris
CE	3	Addison Demetriou
CE	14	Jenson Taumoepeau
WG	17	John Olive
FE	20	Billy Magoulias (c)
HB	7	Braydon Trindall
PR	8	Wesley Lolo
HK	9	Zac Woolford
PR	21	Royce Hunt
SR	11	Teig Wilton
SR	12	Siosifa Talakai
LK	13	Jayson Bukuya
Interchange:
IC	10	Daniel Vasquez
IC	15	Kyle Paterson
IC	16	Brock Gray
IC	23	Kayleb Milne
Reserves:
RE	6	Matt Stimson
RE	21	Tom Hazelton
RE	24	Tom Caughlan
Coach:		Greg Matterson

- On 27 March, the 2020 Canterbury Cup NSW was cancelled due to the COVID-19 pandemic.

== Fixtures ==
=== Pre-season ===
Date	Round	Opponent	Venue	Result	Score	Tries	Goals	Field Goals	Report
14 February	2020 NRL Nines Pool Match	St. George Illawarra Dragons	HBF Park, Perth	Loss	5-27	Katoa (Bonus Zone Try)	Townsend 0/1		
Team Details: SR / 1 / Wade Graham (c); LK / 3 / Jack Williams; PR / 4 / Aaron Woods; HK / 5 / Blayke Brailey; CE / 6 / Josh Morris; CE / 7 / Jesse Ramien; HB / 8 / Chad Townsend; FE / 9 / Shaun Johnson; WG / 10 / Ronaldo Mulitalo; Interchange: IC / 2 / Briton Nikora; IC / 11 / William Kennedy; IC / 12 / Sione Katoa; IC / 13 / Connor Tracey; IC / 16 / Scott Sorensen; Coach: / / John Morris
15 February	2020 NRL Nines Pool Match	Canterbury-Bankstown Bulldogs	HBF Park, Perth	Win	27-4	Morris (3), Tracey (Bonus Zone Try), Mulitalo	Johnson 2/5		
Team Details: SR / 2 / Briton Nikora; PR / 4 / Aaron Woods; CE / 6 / Josh Morris; CE / 7 / Jesse Ramien; HB / 8 / Chad Townsend; FE / 9 / Shaun Johnson; WG / 10 / Ronaldo Mulitalo; WG / 12 / Sione Katoa; HB / 13 / Connor Tracey; Interchange: IC / 11 / William Kennedy; IC / 14 / Billy Magoulias; IC / 15 / Toby Rudolf; IC / 17 / Teig Wilton; IC / 18 / Braydon Trindall; Coach: / / John Morris
23 February	Trial Match	Canterbury-Bankstown Bulldogs	PNG Football Stadium, Port Moresby	Loss	18-30	Kennedy, Katoa, Trindall, Tracey	Trindall 1/4		
Team Details: FB / 1 / William Kennedy; WG / 2 / Sione Katoa; CE / 3 / Jackson Ferris; CE / 4 / Vito Tevaga; WG / 5 / Ronaldo Mulitalo; FE / 6 / Connor Tracey; HB / 7 / Braydon Trindall; PR / 8 / Toby Rudolf; HK / 9 / Cameron King; PR / 10 / Royce Hunt; SR / 11 / Scott Sorensen; SR / 12 / Siosifa Talakai; LK / 13 / Billy Magoulias; Interchange: IC / 14 / Teig Wilton; IC / 15 / Kyle Paterson; IC / 16 / Kayleb Milne; IC / 17 / Connor Luhan; IC / 18 / Franklin Pele; IC / 19 / Tom Hazelton; IC / 20 / Wesley Lolo; IC / 21 / Jonaiah Lualua; IC / 22 / Lorenzo Mulitalo; IC / 23 / Brock Gray; Coach: / / John Morris
2 March	Trial Match	Manly-Warringah Sea Eagles	Netstrata Jubilee Stadium, Sydney	Win	28-16	Tracey (2), Morris, Rudolf, Pele	Townsend 2/3, Hiroti 2/2		
Team Details: FB / 1 / William Kennedy; WG / 2 / Sione Katoa; CE / 3 / Josh Morris; CE / 4 / Jesse Ramien; WG / 21 / Jackson Ferris; FE / 14 / Connor Tracey; HB / 7 / Chad Townsend; PR / 8 / Andrew Fifita; HK / 9 / Blayke Brailey; PR / 10 / Aaron Woods; SR / 11 / Briton Nikora; SR / 12 / Wade Graham (c); LK / 13 / Jack Williams; Interchange: IC / 6 / Braydon Trindall; IC / 15 / Braden Hamlin-Uele; IC / 16 / Toby Rudolf; IC / 17 / Scott Sorensen; IC / 18 / Billy Magoulias; IC / 19 / Siosifa Talakai; IC / 20 / Royce Hunt; IC / 11 / Teig Wilton; IC / 24 / Jensen Taumoepeau; IC / 25 / Mawene Hiroti; IC / 1 / Vito Tevaga; IC / 10 / Franklin Pele; IC / 13 / Kayleb Milne; Coach: / / John Morris

=== Regular season ===
Date	Round	Opponent	Venue	Result	Score	Tries	Goals	Field Goals	Report
14 March	1	South Sydney Rabbitohs	ANZ Stadium, Sydney	Loss	18-22	Katoa (2), Graham	Johnson 3/4		
Team Details: FB / 1 / William Kennedy; WG / 2 / Sione Katoa; CE / 3 / Josh Morris; CE / 4 / Jesse Ramien; WG / 5 / Ronaldo Mulitalo; FE / 6 / Shaun Johnson; HB / 7 / Chad Townsend; PR / 8 / Andrew Fifita; HK / 9 / Blayke Brailey; PR / 10 / Aaron Woods; SR / 11 / Briton Nikora; SR / 12 / Wade Graham (c); LK / 13 / Jack Williams; Interchange: IC / 14 / Connor Tracey; IC / 15 / Braden Hamlin-Uele; IC / 16 / Toby Rudolf; IC / 17 / Scott Sorensen; Reserves: RE / 18 / Billy Magoulias; RE / 19 / Braydon Trindall; RE / 20 / Royce Hunt; RE / 21 / Jackson Ferris; Coach: / / John Morris
21 March	2	Melbourne Storm	Netstrata Jubilee Stadium, Sydney	Loss	10-12	Magoulias	Johnson 3/3		
Team Details: FB / 1 / William Kennedy; WG / 2 / Sione Katoa; CE / 3 / Josh Morris; CE / 4 / Jesse Ramien; WG / 5 / Ronaldo Mulitalo; FE / 6 / Shaun Johnson; HB / 7 / Chad Townsend; PR / 8 / Andrew Fifita; HK / 9 / Blayke Brailey; PR / 10 / Aaron Woods; SR / 17 / Scott Sorensen; SR / 12 / Wade Graham (c); LK / 13 / Jack Williams; Interchange: IC / 14 / Connor Tracey; IC / 15 / Braden Hamlin-Uele; IC / 16 / Toby Rudolf; IC / 18 / Billy Magoulias; Reserves: RE / 11 / Briton Nikora; RE / 19 / Braydon Trindall; RE / 20 / Royce Hunt; RE / 21 / Josh Dugan; Coach: / / John Morris
30 May	3	Wests Tigers	Bankwest Stadium, Sydney	Loss	16-28	Dugan (2), Kennedy	Johnson 2/3		
Team Details: FB / 1 / William Kennedy; WG / 2 / Sione Katoa; CE / 3 / Josh Dugan; CE / 4 / Jesse Ramien; WG / 5 / Ronaldo Mulitalo; FE / 6 / Shaun Johnson; HB / 7 / Chad Townsend; PR / 10 / Aaron Woods; HK / 9 / Blayke Brailey; PR / 16 / Toby Rudolf; SR / 11 / Briton Nikora; SR / 12 / Wade Graham (c); LK / 13 / Jack Williams; Interchange: IC / 15 / Braden Hamlin-Uele; IC / 17 / Scott Sorensen; IC / 18 / Billy Magoulias; IC / 19 / Matt Moylan; Reserves: RE / 8 / Andrew Fifita; RE / 14 / Connor Tracey; RE / 20 / Royce Hunt; RE / 21 / Siosifa Talakai; Coach: / / John Morris
6 June	4	North Queensland Cowboys	Queensland Country Bank Stadium, Townsville	Win	26-16	Ramien (2), Mulitalo (2), Nikora	Johnson 3/6	Johnson 0/1	
Team Details: FB / 1 / William Kennedy; WG / 2 / Sione Katoa; CE / 3 / Josh Dugan; CE / 4 / Jesse Ramien; WG / 5 / Ronaldo Mulitalo; FE / 6 / Matt Moylan; HB / 7 / Shaun Johnson; PR / 8 / Toby Rudolf; HK / 9 / Blayke Brailey; PR / 10 / Aaron Woods; SR / 11 / Briton Nikora; SR / 12 / Wade Graham (c); LK / 13 / Jack Williams; Interchange: IC / 14 / Connor Tracey; IC / 15 / Braden Hamlin-Uele; IC / 16 / Siosifa Talakai; IC / 17 / Scott Sorensen; Reserves: RE / 18 / Billy Magoulias; RE / 19 / Braydon Trindall; RE / 20 / Royce Hunt; RE / 21 / Teig Wilton; Coach: / / John Morris
14 June	5	St. George Illawarra Dragons	Campbelltown Stadium, Sydney	Loss	30-16	Hiroti, Katoa, Graham	Johnson 2/3		
Team Details: FB / 19 / William Kennedy; WG / 2 / Sione Katoa; CE / 3 / Josh Dugan; CE / 4 / Jesse Ramien; WG / 5 / Mawene Hiroti; FE / 6 / Shaun Johnson; HB / 7 / Chad Townsend; PR / 8 / Andrew Fifita; HK / 9 / Blayke Brailey; PR / 10 / Aaron Woods; SR / 11 / Briton Nikora; SR / 12 / Wade Graham (c); LK / 16 / Toby Rudolf; Interchange: IC / 13 / Jack Williams; IC / 14 / Connor Tracey; IC / 15 / Braden Hamlin-Uele; IC / 17 / Scott Sorensen; Reserves: RE / 1 / Matt Moylan; RE / 18 / Siosifa Talakai; RE / 20 / Royce Hunt; RE / 21 / Jackson Ferris; Coach: / / John Morris
21 June	6	Canterbury-Bankstown Bulldogs	Bankwest Stadium, Sydney	Win	20-18	Katoa (3), Goodwin	Johnson 2/4		
Team Details: FB / 21 / Matt Moylan; WG / 2 / Sione Katoa; CE / 3 / Josh Dugan; CE / 4 / Jesse Ramien; WG / 20 / Bryson Goodwin; FE / 6 / Shaun Johnson; HB / 7 / Chad Townsend; PR / 10 / Aaron Woods; HK / 9 / Blayke Brailey; PR / 15 / Braden Hamlin-Uele; SR / 11 / Briton Nikora; SR / 12 / Wade Graham (c); LK / 13 / Jack Williams; Interchange: IC / 8 / Andrew Fifita; IC / 14 / Toby Rudolf; IC / 16 / Siosifa Talakai; IC / 17 / Royce Hunt; Reserves: RE / 1 / William Kennedy; RE / 5 / Mawene Hiroti; RE / 18 / Scott Sorensen; RE / 19 / Connor Tracey; Coach: / / John Morris
28 June	7	Manly-Warringah Sea Eagles	Central Coast Stadium, Central Coast	Win	40-22	Katoa (2), Hamlin-Uele, Ramien, Dugan, Goodwin, Brailey	Johnson 6/7		
Team Details: FB / 1 / Matt Moylan; WG / 2 / Sione Katoa; CE / 3 / Josh Dugan; CE / 4 / Jesse Ramien; WG / 5 / Bryson Goodwin; FE / 6 / Shaun Johnson; HB / 7 / Chad Townsend; PR / 10 / Aaron Woods; HK / 9 / Blayke Brailey; PR / 15 / Braden Hamlin-Uele; SR / 11 / Briton Nikora; SR / 12 / Wade Graham (c); LK / 13 / Jack Williams; Interchange: IC / 8 / Andrew Fifita; IC / 14 / Toby Rudolf; IC / 16 / Siosifa Talakai; IC / 17 / Royce Hunt; Reserves: RE / 18 / Scott Sorensen; RE / 19 / Connor Tracey; RE / 20 / William Kennedy; RE / 21 / Jackson Ferris; Coach: / / John Morris
4 July	8	Gold Coast Titans	Cbus Super Stadium, Gold Coast	Win	40-10	Hamlin-Uele, Fifita, Nikora, Brailey, Townsend, Hunt, Goodwin	Johnson 6/7		
Team Details: FB / 1 / Matt Moylan; WG / 2 / Sione Katoa; CE / 3 / Josh Dugan; CE / 4 / Jesse Ramien; WG / 5 / Bryson Goodwin; FE / 6 / Shaun Johnson; HB / 7 / Chad Townsend; PR / 10 / Aaron Woods; HK / 9 / Blayke Brailey; PR / 15 / Braden Hamlin-Uele; SR / 11 / Briton Nikora; SR / 12 / Wade Graham (c); LK / 13 / Jack Williams; Interchange: IC / 8 / Andrew Fifita; IC / 14 / Toby Rudolf; IC / 16 / Siosifa Talakai; IC / 17 / Royce Hunt; Reserves: RE / 18 / Scott Sorensen; RE / 19 / Connor Tracey; RE / 20 / William Kennedy; RE / 21 / Nene Macdonald; Coach: / / John Morris
11 July	9	Penrith Panthers	Netstrata Jubilee Stadium, Sydney	Loss	24-56	Nikora, Brailey, Ramien, Macdonald	Johnson 4/4		
Team Details: FB / 1 / Josh Dugan; WG / 2 / Sione Katoa; CE / 3 / Bryson Goodwin; CE / 4 / Jesse Ramien; WG / 21 / Nene Macdonald; FE / 6 / Shaun Johnson; HB / 7 / Chad Townsend; PR / 8 / Andrew Fifita; HK / 9 / Blayke Brailey; PR / 10 / Aaron Woods; SR / 11 / Briton Nikora; SR / 12 / Wade Graham (c); LK / 13 / Jack Williams; Interchange: IC / 14 / Toby Rudolf; IC / 15 / Braden Hamlin-Uele; IC / 16 / Siosifa Talakai; IC / 17 / Royce Hunt; Reserves: RE / 5 / Ronaldo Mulitalo; RE / 18 / Scott Sorensen; RE / 19 / Connor Tracey; RE / 20 / William Kennedy; Coach: / / John Morris
19 July	10	New Zealand Warriors	Central Coast Stadium, Central Coast	Win	46-10	Ramien (2), Katoa (2), Hamlin-Uele, Kennedy, Mulitalo, Johnson	Johnson 7/8		
Team Details: FB / 20 / William Kennedy; WG / 2 / Sione Katoa; CE / 1 / Josh Dugan; CE / 4 / Jesse Ramien; WG / 5 / Ronaldo Mulitalo; FE / 6 / Shaun Johnson; HB / 7 / Chad Townsend; PR / 8 / Braden Hamlin-Uele; HK / 9 / Blayke Brailey; PR / 10 / Aaron Woods; SR / 11 / Briton Nikora; SR / 12 / Wade Graham (c); LK / 15 / Scott Sorensen; Interchange: IC / 13 / Toby Rudolf; IC / 14 / Connor Tracey; IC / 16 / Siosifa Talakai; IC / 17 / Royce Hunt; Reserves: RE / 3 / Bryson Goodwin; RE / 18 / Jack Williams; RE / 19 / Billy Magoulias; RE / 21 / Nene Macdonald; Coach: / / John Morris
25 July	11	St. George Illawarra Dragons	Netstrata Jubilee Stadium, Sydney	Win	28-24	Williams, Katoa, Johnson, Kennedy, Woods	Johnson 4/5		
Team Details: FB / 1 / William Kennedy; WG / 2 / Sione Katoa; CE / 4 / Jesse Ramien; CE / 19 / Bryson Goodwin; WG / 5 / Ronaldo Mulitalo; FE / 6 / Shaun Johnson; HB / 7 / Chad Townsend; PR / 8 / Braden Hamlin-Uele; HK / 9 / Blayke Brailey; PR / 10 / Aaron Woods; SR / 11 / Siosifa Talakai; SR / 12 / Wade Graham (c); LK / 15 / Jack Williams; Interchange: IC / 13 / Toby Rudolf; IC / 14 / Connor Tracey; IC / 16 / Teig Wilton; IC / 17 / Royce Hunt; Reserves: RE / 3 / Josh Dugan; RE / 18 / Billy Magoulias; RE / 20 / Daniel Vasquez; RE / 21 / Braydon Trindall; Coach: / / John Morris
31 July	12	Brisbane Broncos	Suncorp Stadium, Brisbane	Win	36-26	Mulitalo, Talakai, Ferris, Katoa, Tracey, Hamlin-Uele	Johnson 6/6		
Team Details: FB / 1 / William Kennedy; WG / 2 / Sione Katoa; CE / 14 / Siosifa Talakai; CE / 20 / Jackson Ferris; WG / 5 / Ronaldo Mulitalo; FE / 6 / Shaun Johnson; HB / 19 / Braydon Trindall; PR / 8 / Braden Hamlin-Uele; HK / 9 / Blayke Brailey; PR / 10 / Aaron Woods; SR / 11 / Briton Nikora; SR / 12 / Wade Graham (c); LK / 15 / Jack Williams; Interchange: IC / 7 / Connor Tracey; IC / 13 / Toby Rudolf; IC / 16 / Teig Wilton; IC / 17 / Royce Hunt; Reserves: RE / 3 / Josh Dugan; RE / 4 / Jesse Ramien; RE / 18 / Bryson Goodwin; RE / 21 / Billy Magoulias; Coach: / / John Morris
9 August	13	Parramatta Eels	Netstrata Jubilee Stadium, Sydney	Loss	12-14	Mulitalo (2), Ramien	Johnson 0/3		
Team Details: FB / 1 / William Kennedy; WG / 2 / Sione Katoa; CE / 3 / Josh Dugan; CE / 4 / Jesse Ramien; WG / 5 / Ronaldo Mulitalo; FE / 6 / Matt Moylan; HB / 7 / Shaun Johnson; PR / 8 / Braden Hamlin-Uele; HK / 9 / Blayke Brailey; PR / 10 / Aaron Woods; SR / 11 / Siosifa Talakai; SR / 12 / Wade Graham (c); LK / 18 / Scott Sorensen; Interchange: IC / 13 / Toby Rudolf; IC / 14 / Connor Tracey; IC / 16 / Teig Wilton; IC / 17 / Royce Hunt; Reserves: RE / 15 / Jack Williams; RE / 19 / Briton Nikora; RE / 20 / Braydon Trindall; RE / 21 / Bryson Goodwin; Coach: / / John Morris
15 August	14	Gold Coast Titans	Netstrata Jubilee Stadium, Sydney	Win	30-18	Dugan, Talakai, Katoa, Graham, Williams	Johnson 3/3, Moylan 2/2		
Team Details: FB / 1 / William Kennedy; WG / 2 / Sione Katoa; CE / 3 / Josh Dugan; CE / 4 / Jesse Ramien; WG / 5 / Ronaldo Mulitalo; FE / 6 / Matt Moylan; HB / 7 / Shaun Johnson; PR / 8 / Braden Hamlin-Uele; HK / 9 / Blayke Brailey; PR / 10 / Aaron Woods; SR / 11 / Siosifa Talakai; SR / 12 / Wade Graham (c); LK / 15 / Scott Sorensen; Interchange: IC / 13 / Toby Rudolf; IC / 14 / Connor Tracey; IC / 16 / Jack Williams; IC / 17 / Royce Hunt; Reserves: RE / 18 / Teig Wilton; RE / 19 / Briton Nikora; RE / 20 / Braydon Trindall; RE / 21 / Bryson Goodwin; Coach: / / John Morris
21 August	15	Penrith Panthers	Panthers Stadium	Loss	12-38	Ramien, Tracey	Moylan 2/2		
Team Details: FB / 1 / William Kennedy; WG / 2 / Sione Katoa; CE / 3 / Josh Dugan; CE / 4 / Jesse Ramien; WG / 5 / Ronaldo Mulitalo; FE / 6 / Matt Moylan; HB / 20 / Braydon Trindall; PR / 10 / Aaron Woods; HK / 9 / Blayke Brailey; PR / 13 / Toby Rudolf; SR / 11 / Siosifa Talakai; SR / 12 / Wade Graham (c); LK / 15 / Scott Sorensen; Interchange: IC / 8 / Braden Hamlin-Uele; IC / 14 / Connor Tracey; IC / 16 / Jack Williams; IC / 17 / Royce Hunt; Reserves: RE / 7 / Shaun Johnson; RE / 18 / Teig Wilton; RE / 19 / Briton Nikora; RE / 21 / Bryson Goodwin; Coach: / / John Morris
29 August	16	North Queensland Cowboys	Netstrata Jubilee Stadium, Sydney	Win	28-12	Nikora, Katoa, Hamlin-Uele, Talakai, Tracey	Trindall 4/5		
Team Details: FB / 1 / William Kennedy; WG / 2 / Sione Katoa; CE / 3 / Josh Dugan; CE / 4 / Jesse Ramien; WG / 5 / Ronaldo Mulitalo; FE / 6 / Connor Tracey; HB / 23 / Braydon Trindall; PR / 8 / Braden Hamlin-Uele; HK / 9 / Blayke Brailey; PR / 10 / Aaron Woods; SR / 11 / Briton Nikora; SR / 12 / Wade Graham (c); LK / 15 / Scott Sorensen; Interchange: IC / 13 / Toby Rudolf; IC / 14 / Siosifa Talakai; IC / 17 / Royce Hunt; IC / 21 / Andrew Fifita; Reserves: RE / 7 / Shaun Johnson; RE / 16 / Jack Williams; RE / 18 / Teig Wilton; RE / 19 / Bryson Goodwin; RE / 20 / Matt Moylan; Coach: / / John Morris
4 September	17	Newcastle Knights	McDonald Jones Stadium, Newcastle	Loss	10-38	Mulitalo, Tracey	Goodwin 1/1, Trindall 0/1		
Team Details: FB / 1 / William Kennedy; WG / 5 / Ronaldo Mulitalo; CE / 3 / Josh Dugan; CE / 4 / Jesse Ramien; WG / 19 / Bryson Goodwin; FE / 6 / Braydon Trindall; HB / 7 / Chad Townsend; PR / 8 / Braden Hamlin-Uele; HK / 9 / Blayke Brailey; PR / 10 / Aaron Woods; SR / 11 / Briton Nikora; SR / 12 / Wade Graham (c); LK / 15 / Scott Sorensen; Interchange: IC / 13 / Toby Rudolf; IC / 14 / Connor Tracey; IC / 16 / Siosifa Talakai; IC / 17 / Royce Hunt; Reserves: RE / 2 / Sione Katoa; RE / 18 / Jack Williams; RE / 20 / Teig Wilton; RE / 21 / Andrew Fifita; Coach: / / John Morris
13 September	18	New Zealand Warriors	Netstrata Jubilee Stadium, Sydney	Win	22-14	Mulitalo (2), Katoa, Rudolf	Johnson 3/5		
Team Details: FB / 1 / William Kennedy; WG / 2 / Sione Katoa; CE / 3 / Josh Dugan; CE / 4 / Jesse Ramien; WG / 5 / Ronaldo Mulitalo; FE / 6 / Connor Tracey; HB / 7 / Shaun Johnson (c); PR / 8 / Braden Hamlin-Uele; HK / 9 / Blayke Brailey; PR / 10 / Aaron Woods; SR / 11 / Briton Nikora; SR / 12 / Siosifa Talakai; LK / 13 / Toby Rudolf; Interchange: IC / 14 / Teig Wilton; IC / 15 / Jack Williams; IC / 16 / Andrew Fifita; IC / 17 / Royce Hunt; Reserves: RE / 18 / Scott Sorensen; RE / 19 / Bryson Goodwin; RE / 20 / Braydon Trindall; RE / 21 / Billy Magoulias; RE / 24 / Mawene Hiroti; Coach: / / John Morris
19 September	19	Sydney Roosters	Sydney Cricket Ground, Sydney	Loss	18-34	Talakai, Mulitalo, Hamlin-Uele	Johnson 2/2, Katoa 1/1		
Team Details: FB / 1 / William Kennedy; WG / 2 / Sione Katoa; CE / 3 / Josh Dugan; CE / 4 / Jesse Ramien; WG / 5 / Ronaldo Mulitalo; FE / 6 / Connor Tracey; HB / 7 / Shaun Johnson (c); PR / 8 / Braden Hamlin-Uele; HK / 9 / Blayke Brailey; PR / 10 / Aaron Woods; SR / 11 / Briton Nikora; SR / 12 / Siosifa Talakai; LK / 13 / Toby Rudolf; Interchange: IC / 15 / Jack Williams; IC / 16 / Andrew Fifita; IC / 17 / Royce Hunt; IC / 18 / Scott Sorensen; Reserves: RE / 14 / Teig Wilton; RE / 19 / Bryson Goodwin; RE / 20 / Braydon Trindall; RE / 21 / Billy Magoulias; Coach: / / John Morris
26 September	20	Canberra Raiders	Netstrata Jubilee Stadium, Sydney	Loss	28-38	Nikora (2), Mulitalo, Graham, Goodwin	Hiroti 4/5		
Team Details: FB / 1 / William Kennedy; WG / 2 / Nene Macdonald; CE / 3 / Mawene Hiroti; CE / 19 / Bryson Goodwin; WG / 5 / Ronaldo Mulitalo; FE / 6 / Wade Graham (c); HB / 7 / Connor Tracey; PR / 8 / Braden Hamlin-Uele; HK / 20 / Braydon Trindall; PR / 10 / Aaron Woods; SR / 11 / Briton Nikora; SR / 17 / Teig Wilton; LK / 14 / Scott Sorensen; Interchange: IC / 15 / Jack Williams; IC / 16 / Andrew Fifita; IC / 18 / Billy Magoulias; IC / 21 / Daniel Vasquez; Reserves: RE / 4 / Jesse Ramien; RE / 9 / Blayke Brailey; RE / 12 / Siosifa Talakai; RE / 13 / Toby Rudolf; Coach: / / John Morris

- From Round 2, the NRL announced that matches would be played behind closed doors until further notice due to the ongoing and escalating COVID-19 situation. At the end of the round however the NRL ceded to the dangers of the pandemic, announcing the immediate and indefinite suspension of the 2020 NRL season due to the COVID-19 pandemic. The season was announced to be reinstated from 28 May and matches were redrawn due to the resulting shortened season.

=== Finals series ===
Date
Round
Opponent
Venue
Result
Score
Tries
Goals
Field Goals
Report
3 October
1
Canberra Raiders
GIO Stadium, Canberra
Loss
20-32
Mulitalo, Brailey, Katoa
Townsend 4/5

Team Details

FB	1	William Kennedy
WG	2	Sione Katoa
CE	3	Josh Dugan
CE	4	Jesse Ramien
WG	5	Ronaldo Mulitalo
FE	6	Connor Tracey
HB	7	Chad Townsend
PR	8	Braden Hamlin-Uele
HK	9	Blayke Brailey
PR	13	Toby Rudolf
SR	11	Briton Nikora
SR	12	Wade Graham (c)
LK	14	Siosifa Talakai
Interchange:
IC	10	Aaron Woods
IC	15	Scott Sorensen
IC	16	Andrew Fifita
IC	17	Jack Williams
Reserves:
RE	18	Teig Wilton
RE	19	Braydon Trindall
RE	20	Mawene Hiroti
RE	21	Bryson Goodwin
Coach:		John Morris

=== Ladder ===
Pos	Team	Pld	W	D	L	B	PF	PA	PD	Pts	
1	Penrith Panthers (M)	20	18	1	1	0	537	238	+299	37	Advance to finals series
2	Melbourne Storm (P)	20	16	0	4	0	534	276	+258	32	Advance to finals series
3	Parramatta Eels	20	15	0	5	0	392	288	+104	30	Advance to finals series
4	Sydney Roosters	20	14	0	6	0	552	322	+230	28	Advance to finals series
5	Canberra Raiders	20	14	0	6	0	445	317	+128	28	Advance to finals series
6	South Sydney Rabbitohs	20	12	0	8	0	521	352	+169	24	Advance to finals series
7	Newcastle Knights	20	11	1	8	0	421	374	+47	23	Advance to finals series
8	Cronulla-Sutherland Sharks	20	10	0	10	0	480	480	0	20	Advance to finals series
9	Gold Coast Titans	20	9	0	11	0	346	463	−117	18	
10	New Zealand Warriors	20	8	0	12	0	343	458	−115	16	
11	Wests Tigers	20	7	0	13	0	440	505	−65	14	
12	St. George Illawarra Dragons	20	7	0	13	0	378	452	−74	14	
13	Manly Warringah Sea Eagles	20	7	0	13	0	375	509	−134	14	
14	North Queensland Cowboys	20	5	0	15	0	368	520	−152	10	
15	Canterbury-Bankstown Bulldogs	20	3	0	17	0	282	504	−222	6	
16	Brisbane Broncos (W)	20	3	0	17	0	268	624	−356	6	

Updated to match(es) played on 27 September 2020. Source: 2020 NRL Ladder
(M) Minor premiers; (P) Premiers; (W) Wooden spoon

== Squad ==
No	Nat	Player	1st Position	2nd Position	Age	Height	Weight	NRL Games	Previous 1st Grade Club
1	(Australia)	William Kennedy	Fullback		23	183	88	19	None
2	(Tonga)	Sione Katoa	Wing		23	180	88	35	None
3	(Australia)	Josh Morris; Mid-season loss	Centre	Wing	34	182	98	304	Canterbury-Bankstown Bulldogs
4	(Australia)	Jesse Ramien	Centre		23	184	98	58	Newcastle Knights
5	(Samoa)	Ronaldo Mulitalo	Wing		20	190	95	24	None
6	(New Zealand)	Shaun Johnson	Five-Eighth	Halfback	30	179	91	196	New Zealand Warriors
7	(Australia)	Chad Townsend	Halfback		29	181	89	176	New Zealand Warriors
8	(Tonga)	Andrew Fifita	Prop		31	194	118	223	Wests Tigers
9	(Australia)	Blayke Brailey	Hooker		21	180	80	35	None
10	(Australia)	Aaron Woods	Prop		29	194	111	209	Canterbury-Bankstown Bulldogs
11	(New Zealand)	Briton Nikora	Second Row		22	185	94	40	None
12	(Australia)	Wade Graham (c)	Second Row	Five-Eighth	29	186	96	248	Penrith Panthers
13	(Australia)	Jack Williams	Lock	Prop	24	184	98	45	None
14	(Australia)	Connor Tracey	Five-Eighth		24	183	87	18	South Sydney Rabbitohs
15	(New Zealand)	Braden Hamlin-Uele	Prop		25	191	115	44	North Queensland Cowboys
16	(Australia)	Toby Rudolf	Lock	Prop	24	190	106	20	None
17	(Australia)	Scott Sorensen	Lock	Second Row	27	183	99	39	Canberra Raiders
18	(Greece)	Billy Magoulias	Lock		23	179	99	5	None
19	(Australia)	Josh Dugan	Centre	Fullback	30	189	102	207	St. George Illawarra Dragons
20	(Australia)	Matt Moylan	Fullback	Five-Eighth	29	185	90	132	Penrith Panthers
21	(Australia)	Siosifa Talakai	Second Row	Centre	23	178	100	27	South Sydney Rabbitohs
22	(New Zealand)	Mawene Hiroti	Wing	Centre	21	187	95	7	South Sydney Rabbitohs
23	(Australia)	Bryson Goodwin; Mid-season gain	Wing	Centre	34	186	98	183	Warrington Wolves
24	(Australia)	Royce Hunt	Prop		25	192	112	15	Canberra Raiders
25	(Papua New Guinea)	Nene Macdonald; Mid-season gain	Wing	Centre	26	192	108	98	North Queensland Cowboys
26	(Australia)	Teig Wilton	Second Row		20	186	98	5	None
27	(Australia)	Braydon Trindall	Halfback	Five-Eighth	21	180	90	5	None
28	(New Zealand)	Jackson Ferris	Centre		22	178	93	1	None
29	(Australia)	Daniel Vasquez	Lock	Prop	23	189	107	1	None
	(Fiji)	Jayson Bukuya; Mid-season loss	Second Row	Lock	31	190	95	186	New Zealand Warriors
	(Australia)	Josh Carr	Second Row	Lock	22	196	101	0	None
	(Australia)	Cameron King	Hooker		28	180	90	43	Featherstone Rovers
	(New Zealand)	Kayleb Milne	Second Row		21	193	103	0	None
	(Australia)	Kyle Paterson	Hooker		21	178	83	0	None
	(New Zealand)	Franklin Pele	Prop		19	190	132	0	None
	(New Zealand)	Jensen Taumoepeau	Centre	Fullback	20	189	102	0	None
	(New Zealand)	Cruz Topai-Aveai; Mid-season loss	Prop		21	192	112	0	None
	(Australia)	Jack A Williams	Five-Eighth	Halfback	23	188	97	0	None
	(Australia)	Bronson Xerri; Provisionally suspended via ASADA	Centre		20	187	99	22	None

== Player movements ==
Losses

- Jayden Brailey to Newcastle Knights
- Kurt Capewell to Penrith Panthers
- Sosaia Feki to Castleford Tigers
- Kyle Flanagan to Sydney Roosters
- Paul Gallen retired
- Aaron Gray released
- Jaimin Jolliffe to Gold Coast Titans
- Josh Morris to Sydney Roosters (mid-season)
- Matt Prior to Leeds Rhinos
- Cruz Topai-Aveai released (mid-season)
- Bronson Xerri suspended (mid-season)

Gains

- Bryson Goodwin from South Sydney Rabbitohs (mid-season)
- Mawene Hiroti from South Sydney Rabbitohs
- Royce Hunt from Canberra Raiders
- Cameron King from Featherstone Rovers
- Nene Macdonald from free agent (mid-season)
- Kyle Paterson from Canberra Raiders
- Jesse Ramien from Newcastle Knights
- Siosifa Talakai from Newtown Jets
- Connor Tracey from South Sydney Rabbitohs
- Jack A Williams from Newtown Jets

== Representative honours ==
The following players have played a first grade representative match in 2020. (C) = Captain

Player	2020 All Stars match	State of Origin 1	State of Origin 2	State of Origin 3	International Rugby League tests
Andrew Fifita	-^{1}	-	-	-	-
Wade Graham	Indigenous All Stars	-	-	-	-
Briton Nikora	Māori All Stars	-	-	-	-
Jesse Ramien	Indigenous All Stars	-	-	-	-

^{1} – Andrew Fifita was originally selected to play, but was subsequently forced to withdraw following injury.

== Squad statistics ==
Statistics Source:

Name	App	T	G	FG	Pts
Blayke Brailey	20	4	0	0	16
Josh Dugan	16	4	0	0	16
Jackson Ferris	1	1	0	0	4
Andrew Fifita	12	1	0	0	4
Bryson Goodwin	7	4	1	0	18
Wade Graham	19	4	0	0	16
Braden Hamlin-Uele	21	6	0	0	24
Mawene Hiroti	2	1	4	0	8
Royce Hunt	14	1	0	0	4
Shaun Johnson	16	2	56	0	120
Sione Katoa	19	16	1	0	66
William Kennedy	17	3	0	0	12
Nene Macdonald	2	1	0	0	4
Billy Magoulias	3	1	0	0	4
Josh Morris	2	0	0	0	0
Matt Moylan	8	0	4	0	8
Ronaldo Mulitalo	16	12	0	0	48
Briton Nikora	16	6	0	0	24
Jesse Ramien	19	8	0	0	32
Toby Rudolf	20	1	0	0	4
Scott Sorensen	14	0	0	0	0
Siosifa Talakai	16	4	0	0	16
Chad Townsend	12	1	4	0	12
Connor Tracey	16	4	0	0	16
Braydon Trindall	5	0	4	0	8
Jack Williams	17	2	0	0	8
Teig Wilton	5	0	0	0	0
Aaron Woods	21	1	0	0	4
28 Players used	—	0	0	0	0
