= 2026 All Stars match =

Rugby league match

The 2026 All Stars match was the fifteenth annual representative exhibition All Stars match of Australian rugby league. The matches was played between the Indigenous All Stars and the Māori All Stars at FMG Stadium Waikato on 15 February 2026.

== Men's All Stars match ==
2026 All Stars match
Māori All Stars	Indigenous All Stars
16	16
	1	2	3	4	Total
MĀO	6	4	6	0	16
IND	12	0	4	0	16
- Date: 15 February 2026
- Stadium: FMG Stadium Waikato
- Location: Hamilton, New Zealand
- Preston Campbell Medal: Keano Kini (MĀO)
- Referee: Adam Gee (Note: Gee was replaced by Belinda Sharpe after 60 minutes due to a hamstring injury.)
- Attendance: 18,169

Broadcast partners
- Broadcasters: Sky Sport Nine Network Fox League

=== Teams ===
For the Māori All Stars, Ethan Roberts was originally selected to play but withdrew due to injury. He was replaced by Caleb Tohi, while Leo Thompson was originally selected to play, but withdrew due to injury on game day. Royce Hunt was moved from the bench to prop forward and the lateness of Thompson's withdrawal, no replacement was able to be brought in.

Josh Kerr was originally selected to play for the Indigenous All Stars, but was ruled out due to injury. Kaiden Lahrs was moved from the bench to prop forward, and due to the lateness of Kerr's withdrawal, no replacement was able to be brought in.

Team details
Māori All Stars		Position	Indigenous All Stars
Name	Number	Position	Number	Name
Keano Kini	1	Fullback	1	Trai Fuller
Jojo Fifita	2	Wing	2	Josh Addo-Carr
Casey McLean	3	Centre	3	Jack Wighton
Mawene Hiroti	4	Centre	4	Jesse Ramien
Dallin Watene-Zelezniak	5	Wing	5	Alofiana Khan-Pereira
Charnze Nicoll-Klokstad (c)	6	Five eighth	6	Braydon Trindall
Te Maire Martin	7	Half back	7	Nicho Hynes (c)
Trey Mooney	8	Prop forward	10	Shaquai Mitchell
Zach Dockar-Clay	9	Hooker	9	Connor Watson
Royce Hunt	15	Prop forward	16	Kaiden Lahrs
Briton Nikora	11	Second row	11	Tallis Duncan
Jacob Laban	12	Second row	12	Josh Patston
James Fisher-Harris (c)	13	Lock forward	13	Hohepa Puru
Trent Toelau	14	Interchange	14	Jamal Fogarty
Preston Riki	16	Interchange	15	Jayden Campbell
Joe Chan	17	Interchange	17	Blake Steep
Manaia Waitere	18	Interchange	18	Oliver Pascoe
Adam Pompey	19	Interchange	19	Caleb Tohi
Jesse Arthars	20	Interchange	20	Brent Woolf
Adam Blair		Coach		Ronald Griffiths

=== Result ===
2026 Rugby League All Stars

Sunday, 15 March
15:55 NZDT (UTC+13)

Māori All Stars (Māori people)	16 – 16	Indigenous All Stars
Tries: 3 Laban 4'; Watene-Zelezniak 30'; Toelau 54'; Goals: 2 Hiroti 5', 55' (2/2); Pompey 31' (0/1); Field goals: 0 Dockar-Clay 80'	1st: 10–12; 2nd: 6–4; Report	Tries: 3 Steep 9'; Watson 15'; Addo-Carr 45'; Goals: 2 Hynes 11', 16' 47' (2/3)

FMG Stadium Waikato
Attendance: 18,169
Referee: Adam Gee
Video referee: Ashley Klein
Touch judges: Matt Noyen, Dave Munro
Preston Campbell Medal: Keano Kini (Māori All Stars)

== Women's All Star match ==
2026 All Stars match
Māori Ferns	Indigenous Women's All Stars
14	20
	1	2	Total
MĀO	14	0	14
IND	0	20	20
- Date: 15 February 2026
- Stadium: FMG Stadium Waikato
- Location: Hamilton, New Zealand
- Trish Hina Medal: Krystal Blackwell (IND)
- Referee: Belinda Sharpe

Broadcast partners
- Broadcasters: Sky Sport Nine Network Fox League

=== Result ===
A try to Indigenous All Stars Jada Taylor in the final minutes sealed a comeback win for the visitors. Taylor grabbed a cutout pass from player of the match Krystal Blackwell to burst through a score a long-range try. The Indigenous team had struggled playing into the breeze in the first half, conceding three tries.

2026 Rugby League All Stars

Sunday, 15 March
13:45 NZDT (UTC+13)

Māori All Stars (Māori people)	14 – 20	Indigenous All Stars
Tries: 3 Willison 11', 23'; Butler 6'; Goals: 1 Temara 7' 13', 25' (1/3)	1st: 14–0; 2nd: 0–20; Report	Tries: 4 Hippi 33'; Turnbull 35'; Blackwell 46'; Taylor 59'; Goals: 2 Dibb 35', 47' 34', 60' (2/4)

FMG Stadium Waikato
Attendance: 18,169
Referee: Belinda Sharpe
Video referee: Ashley Klein
Trish Hina Medal: Krystal Blackwell (Indigenous All Stars)
