= Jackson Ferris =

Jackson Ferris may refer to:

- Jackson Ferris (rugby league)
- Jackson Ferris (baseball)
