= Toby Rudolf =

Australian rugby league footballer

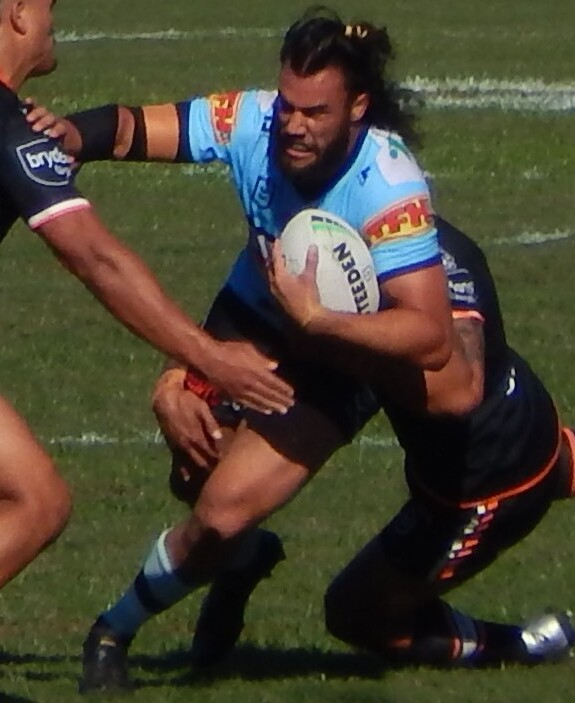
- Rudolf in 2021

Personal information
- Full name: Tobias Eric Rudolf
- Born: 29 January 1996 (age 30) Sydney, New South Wales, Australia
- Height: 190 cm (6 ft 3 in)
- Weight: 106 kg (16 st 10 lb)

Playing information
- Position: Prop, Lock
Club
Years	Team	Pld	T	G	FG	P
2020–	Cronulla Sharks	133	6	0	0	24
- Source: As of 5 September 2026

Tobias Eric Rudolf (born 29 January 1996) is an Australian professional rugby league footballer who plays as a prop and lock forward for the Cronulla-Sutherland Sharks in the National Rugby League.

== Background ==
Rudolf is of German and Jewish descent. Along with rugby league, he grew up playing rugby union.

Rudolf has described his sexuality as fluid, "Sexuality is very fluid. I’ve been out and kissed many gay men, kissed many straight women, and kissed many gay women"...I'm not a one-stop shop. Love is love, and I love to share it with everyone. That's probably why I love going to all the gay bars in Sydney as well. I love dancing with my shirt off and getting down Universal on Oxford Street until 2 am".

== Playing career ==
=== 2018 ===
A South Eastern Seagulls junior, Rudolf began his playing career in South Sydney's Under 20s side before graduating to the club's then feeder side North Sydney. Rudolf played one season for Norths in the Canterbury Cup NSW before signing with Queensland Cup side Redcliffe Dolphins for 2018. Rudolf was part of Redcliffe's 2018 premiership team and won the Duncan Hall Medal for man of the match in the grand final. However Rudolf ruptured his ACL a week later playing for the Dolphins in the 2018 NRL State Championship final.

=== 2019 ===
After being noticed by Cronulla-Sutherland, Rudolf signed a two-year deal with the club starting in 2019. Rudolf returned from his ACL to play for Cronulla's feeder club side Newtown and went onto win the 2019 Canterbury Cup NSW premiership and the 2019 NRL State Championship final where he was awarded man of the match.

=== 2020 ===
Rudolf made his NRL debut in round 1 of the 2020 NRL season for Cronulla-Sutherland against South Sydney at ANZ Stadium.

In round 18 of the 2020 NRL season, Rudolf scored his first try in the top grade in Cronulla's 22-14 victory over the New Zealand Warriors at Kogarah Oval. The victory meant Cronulla qualified for the finals at New Zealand's expense.

=== 2021 ===
In round 20 of the 2021 NRL season, Rudolf was sent to the sin bin for headbutting an opponent during Cronulla's 22-40 loss against rivals Manly in the "Battle of the Beaches" match. Rudolf played every game for Cronulla in the 2021 NRL season which saw the club narrowly miss the finals by finishing 9th on the table.

=== 2022 ===
On 15 August, Rudolf was ruled out from playing for four weeks with a grade two medial ligament tear. Rudolf played a total of 22 games for Cronulla in the 2022 NRL season as the club finished second on the table. In the qualifying final, Rudolf scored a memorable individual try as he beat five North Queensland players to the try line. North Queensland would go on to win the match 32-30. The following week, Rudolf played in the elimination final which Cronulla lost 38-12 against South Sydney.

=== 2023 ===
Rudolf played a total of 15 matches for Cronulla in the 2023 NRL season as they finished sixth on the table. Rudolf played in the clubs 13-12 upset loss against the Sydney Roosters which ended their season.

=== 2024 ===
On 25 March, it was announced that Rudolf would miss 3-6 weeks with an ankle injury which he sustained during Cronulla's upset loss against the Wests Tigers in round 3 of the 2024 NRL season. Rudolf played 21 games for Cronulla in the 2024 NRL season as the club finished 4th on the table and qualified for the finals. During the off-season Rudolf while on holiday injured his shoulder while surfing and would undergo shoulder surgery and will miss the first month of the 2025 season.

=== 2025 ===
Rudolf played 17 games for Cronulla in the 2025 NRL season as the club finished 5th on the table. The club reached the preliminary final for a second consecutive season but lost against Melbourne 22-14.

=== 2026 ===
Rudolf played 14 games for Cronulla in the 2026 NRL season as the club finished 5th on the table and qualified for the finals.

== Statistics ==
NRL
Season	Team	Matches	T	G	GK %	F/G	Pts
2020	Cronulla-Sutherland	20	1	0	—	0	4
2021	Cronulla-Sutherland	24	1	0	—	0	4
2022	Cronulla-Sutherland	22	1	0	—	0	4
2023	Cronulla-Sutherland	15	1	0	—	0	4
2024	Cronulla-Sutherland	21	1	0	—	0	4
2025	Cronulla-Sutherland	17	1	0	—	0	4
2026	Cronulla-Sutherland	14					
Career totals		133	6	0	—	0	24

== Controversy ==
While on a post match show in 2021 Rudolf was asked how he planned to celebrate Cronulla's win over St. George Illawarra, to which he responded that he would probably “drink about 1000 beers” and go to a local club to “try and pull something — anything will do”. NRL CEO Andrew Abdo labelled the comments “offensive and derogatory” before issuing Cronulla and Rudolf with an official warning.
