= 2022 All Stars match =

Australian rugby league match

The 2022 All Stars match was the eleventh annual representative exhibition All Stars match of Australian rugby league. The match was played between the Indigenous All Stars and the Māori All Stars at CommBank Stadium on 12 February 2022.

== Men's All Stars match ==
2022 All Stars match
Māori All Stars	Indigenous All Stars
16	10
	1	2	3	4	Total
MĀO	0	10	6	0	16
IND	6	0	0	4	10
- Date: 12 February 2022
- Stadium: CommBank Stadium
- Location: Parramatta, New South Wales
- Preston Campbell Medal: Joseph Tapine
- Referee: Adam Gee
- Attendance: 26,755

Broadcast partners
- Broadcasters: Nine Network (Highlights) Fox League
- Commentators: Peter Psaltis; Billy Slater; Andrew Johns

=== Teams ===
Māori All Stars	Position	Indigenous All Stars
Jordan Rapana	Fullback	William Kennedy
Morgan Harper	Wing	Hamiso Tabuai-Fidow
Dylan Walker	Centre	Jesse Ramien
Reimis Smith	Centre	Brent Naden^{1}
Patrick Herbert	Wing	Josh Addo-Carr (c)
Chanel Harris-Tavita	Five-eighth	Nicho Hynes
Kodi Nikorima (c)	Halfback	Braydon Trindall
Joseph Tapine (c)	Prop	Andrew Fifita
Erin Clark	Hooker	Reuben Cotter
James Fisher-Harris	Prop	Ryan James
Kenny Bromwich	2nd Row	David Fifita
Briton Nikora	2nd Row	Tyrell Fuimaono
Jazz Tevaga	Lock	Joshua Curran
Esan Marsters	Interchange	Albert Kelly
Royce Hunt	Interchange	Will Smith
TC Robati	Interchange	Jamayne Taunoa-Brown
Kevin Proctor	Interchange	Josh Kerr
Tuku Hau Tapuha	Interchange	Selwyn Cobbo
Jayden Nikorima	Interchange	Tyrell Sloan^{3}
Wiremu Greig^{4}	Interchange	Shaquai Mitchell^{2}
David Kidwell	Coach	Laurie Daley

^{1} - Kotoni Staggs was originally selected to play but withdrew. He was replaced by Brent Naden.
^{2} - Jack Bird was originally selected to play but withdrew due to injury. He was replaced by Shaquai Mitchell.
^{3} - Alex Johnston was originally selected to play but withdrew. He was replaced by Tyrell Sloan.
^{4} - Pasami Saulo was originally selected to play but was withdrawn due to contracting COVID-19. He was replaced by Wiremu Greig.

=== Result ===
12 February 2022
8:20pm (AEDT)

Māori All Stars (Māori people)	16 – 10	Indigenous All Stars
Tries: Kodi Nikorima (25') 1 Esan Marsters (33') 1 Joseph Tapine (57') 1 Goals: Patrick Herbert 1/2 (27'); Kodi Nikorima 1/1 (58'); Sin Bin: Jordan Rapana (20') 1	1st: 0 - 6; 2nd: 10 - 0; 3rd: 6 - 0; 4th: 0 - 4 Highlights	Tries: Jesse Ramien (13') 1 Tyrell Sloan (67') 1 Goals: Braydon Trindall 1/1 (20' pen); Nicho Hynes 0/2; Sin Bin: Andrew Fifita (20') 1 Jesse Ramien (56') 1

CommBank Stadium
Attendance: 26,755
Preston Campbell Medal: Joseph Tapine
Referee: Adam Gee

== Women's All Stars match ==
2022 All Stars match
Māori All Stars	Indigenous All Stars
8	18
	1	2	3	4	Total
MĀO	0	4	4	0	8
IND	0	6	6	6	18
- Date: 12 February 2022
- Stadium: Commbank Stadium
- Location: Sydney, New South Wales
- Player of the Match: Jaime Chapman
- Referee: Kasey Badger

Broadcast partners
- Broadcasters: Nine Network (Highlights) Fox League

=== Teams ===
MĀORI ALL STARS	Position	INDIGENOUS ALL STARS
Botille Vette-Welsh	Fullback	Tamika Upton
Jocephy Daniels	Wing	Jaime Chapman
Tiana Raftstrand-Smith	Centre	Bobbi Law
Corban Baxter	Centre	Jasmine Peters
Autumn-Rain Stephens-Daly	Wing	Rhiannon Revell-Blair
Raecene McGregor	Five-eighth	Kirra Dibb
Zahara Temara	Halfback	Tahlulah Tillett
Shannon Mato	Prop	Tommaya Kelly-Sines
Nita Maynard	Hooker	Quincy Dodd
Rona Peters	Prop	Caitlan Johnston
Roxette Murdoch	2nd Row	Shaniah Power
Olivia Kernick	2nd Row	Shaylee Bent
Kennedy Cherrington	Lock	Keilee Joseph
Mya Hill-Moana	Interchange	Sarah Field
Krystal Rota	Interchange	Janelle Williams
Rangimarie Edwards-Bruce	Interchange	Kaitlyn Phillips
Lavinia Gould	Interchange	Kyra Simon
Keith Hanley	Coach	Ben Jeffries

=== Result ===
12 February 2022
5:20pm (AEDT)

Indigenous All Stars	18—8	(Māori people) Māori All Stars
Tries: 3 Jamie Chapman (23', 32') 2 Tommaya Kelly-Sines (46') 1 Goals: 3 Kirra Dibb (24', 34', 48') 3/3	1st: 0—0; 2nd: 6—4; 3rd: 6—4; 4th: 6—0; Highlights	Tries: 2 Autumn-Rain Stephens Daly (29', 42') 2 Goals: nil

CommBank Stadium
Attendance: 10,066
Referee: Kasey Badger
Player of the Match: Jaime Chapman
