= Teig Wilton =

Australian rugby league footballer

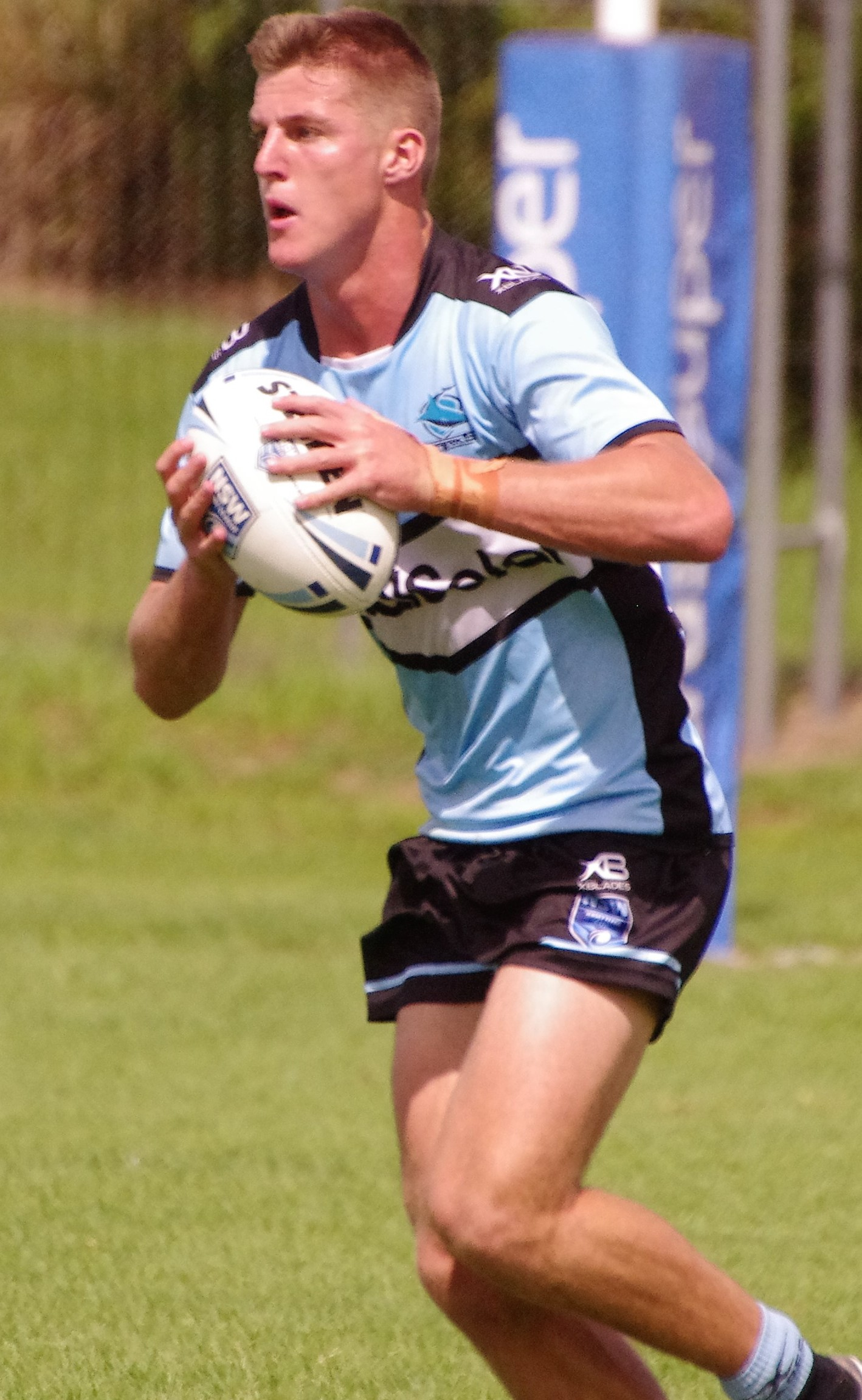

Personal information
- Full name: Teigan Wilton
- Born: 25 September 1999 (age 27) Narooma, New South Wales, Australia
- Height: 186 cm (6 ft 1 in)
- Weight: 100 kg (15 st 10 lb)

Playing information
- Position: Second-row
Club
Years	Team	Pld	T	G	FG	P
2020–	Cronulla Sharks	129	31	0	0	124
- Source: As of 17 November 2026
- Relatives: John Morris (uncle)

Teig Wilton (born 25 September 1999) is an Australian professional rugby league footballer who plays as a second-row forward for the Cronulla-Sutherland Sharks in the National Rugby League (NRL).

== Background ==
Wilton played his junior rugby league for the Narooma Devils in the Group 16 Rugby League.

He is the nephew of former Cronulla-Sutherland Sharks coach John Morris.

== Early career ==
=== 2020 ===
Wilton made his first grade debut in round 11 of the 2020 NRL season for Cronulla against the St. George Illawarra Dragons.

=== 2021 ===
In round 4 of the 2021 NRL season, he scored his first try in the top grade for Cronulla in a 48-10 victory over North Queensland at Kogarah Oval. Wilton played 15 games for Cronulla in the 2021 NRL season which saw the club narrowly miss the finals by finishing 9th on the table.

=== 2022 ===
Wilton played a total of 24 games for Cronulla in the 2022 NRL season scoring four tries. Wilton played in both of Cronulla's finals matches as they were eliminated in straight sets losing to North Queensland and South Sydney.

=== 2023 ===
Following Cronulla's loss against the New Zealand Warriors in round 20 of the 2023 NRL season, it was announced that Wilton had been ruled out for the remainder of the year with a knee injury.

=== 2024 ===
In round 6 of the 2024 NRL season, Wilton scored two tries for Cronulla in their 34-22 victory over South Sydney. Wilton played 23 games for Cronulla in the 2024 NRL season as the club finished 4th on the table and qualified for the finals. On 18 December, the Sharks announced that Wilton had re-signed with the club until the end of 2027.

=== 2025 ===
Wilton played 21 games for Cronulla in the 2025 NRL season as the club finished 5th on the table. Cronulla reached the preliminary final for a second consecutive season but lost against Melbourne 22-14.

=== 2026 ===
In round 9 of the 2026 NRL season, Wilton scored a hat-trick in Cronulla's 52-10 victory over the Wests Tigers. Wilton played 23 matches for Cronulla in the 2026 NRL season as the club finished 5th on the table and qualified for the finals.

== Statistics ==
=== NRL ===
Season	Team	Matches	T	G	GK %	F/G	Pts
2020	Cronulla	5	0	0	—	0	0
2021	Cronulla	16	2	0	—	0	8
2022	Cronulla	24	6	0	—	0	24
2023	Cronulla	17	6	0	—	0	24
2024	Cronulla	23	5	0	—	0	20
2025	Cronulla	21	4	0	—	0	16
2026	Cronulla	23	8	0	—	0	32
2027	Cronulla				—		
Career totals		129	31	0	—	0	124
