= Siosifa Talakai =

Tonga international rugby league footballer

Sifa Talakai
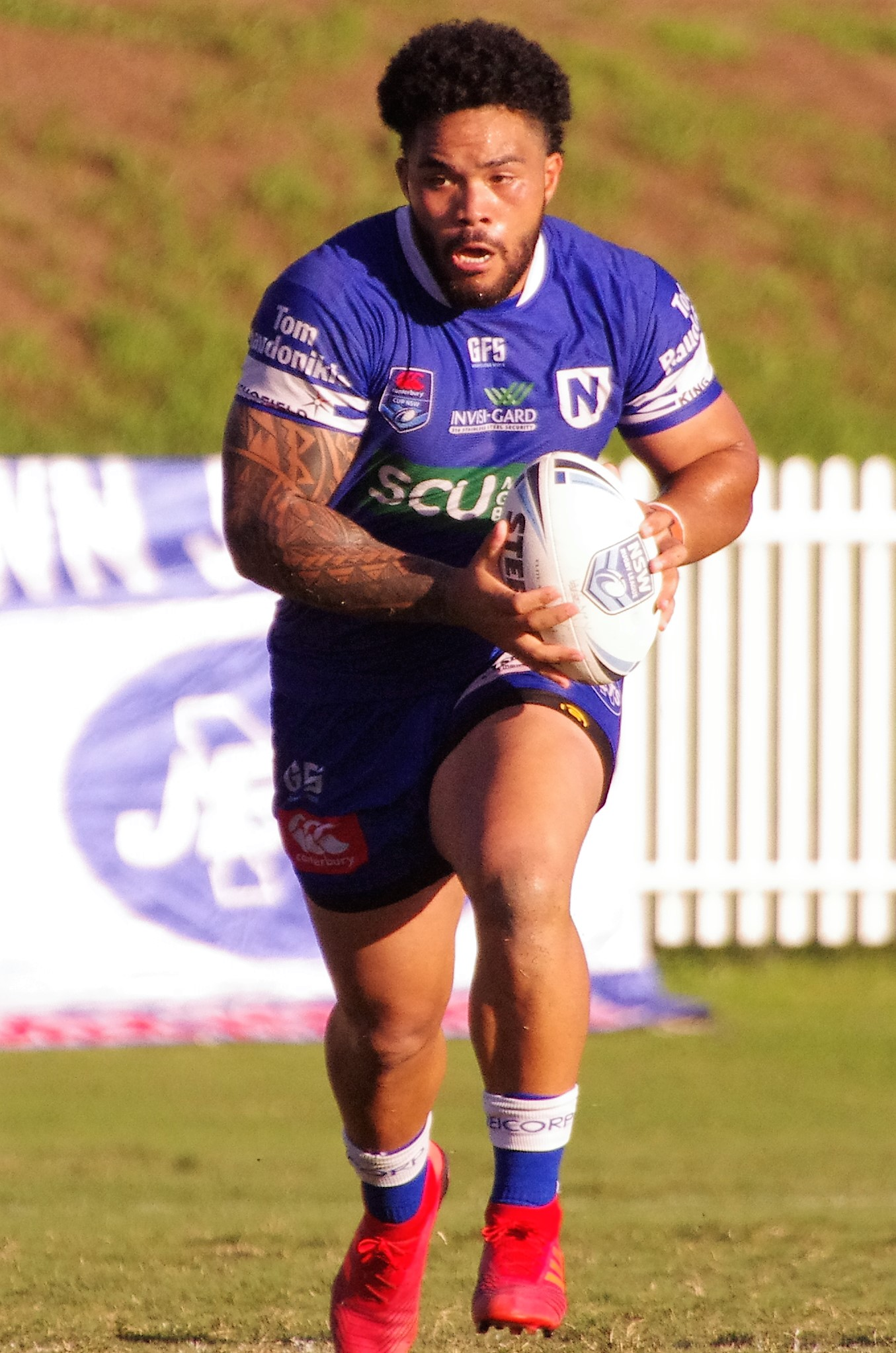

Personal information
- Full name: Siosifa Talakai
- Born: 18 April 1997 (age 29) Sydney, New South Wales, Australia
- Height: 178 cm (5 ft 10 in)
- Weight: 100 kg (15 st 10 lb)

Playing information
- Position: Centre, Second-row
Club
Years	Team	Pld	T	G	FG	P
2016–17	South Sydney	11	2	0	0	8
2020–26	Cronulla Sharks	145	31	1	0	126
2027–	Perth Bears	0	0	0	0	0
	Total	156	33	1	0	134
Representative
Years	Team	Pld	T	G	FG	P
2022	New South Wales	2	0	0	0	0
2022	Tonga	2	0	1	0	2
- Source: As of 6 November 2026

Siosifa Talakai (born 18 April 1997) is a Tonga international rugby league footballer who plays as a centre or second-row forward for the Perth Bears in the National Rugby League (NRL).

He has played representative football for New South Wales in the State of Origin series and Tonga at international level.

He previously played for the South Sydney Rabbitohs and Cronulla Sharks in the National Rugby League.

== Background ==
Talakai was born in Sydney, New South Wales, Australia. He is of Tongan and Niuean descent.

He played for the Junior Kiwis and his junior rugby league for the Mascot Jets before being signed by the South Sydney Rabbitohs.

== Playing career ==
=== Early career ===
In 2015 and 2016, Talakai played for the South Sydney Rabbitohs' NYC team.

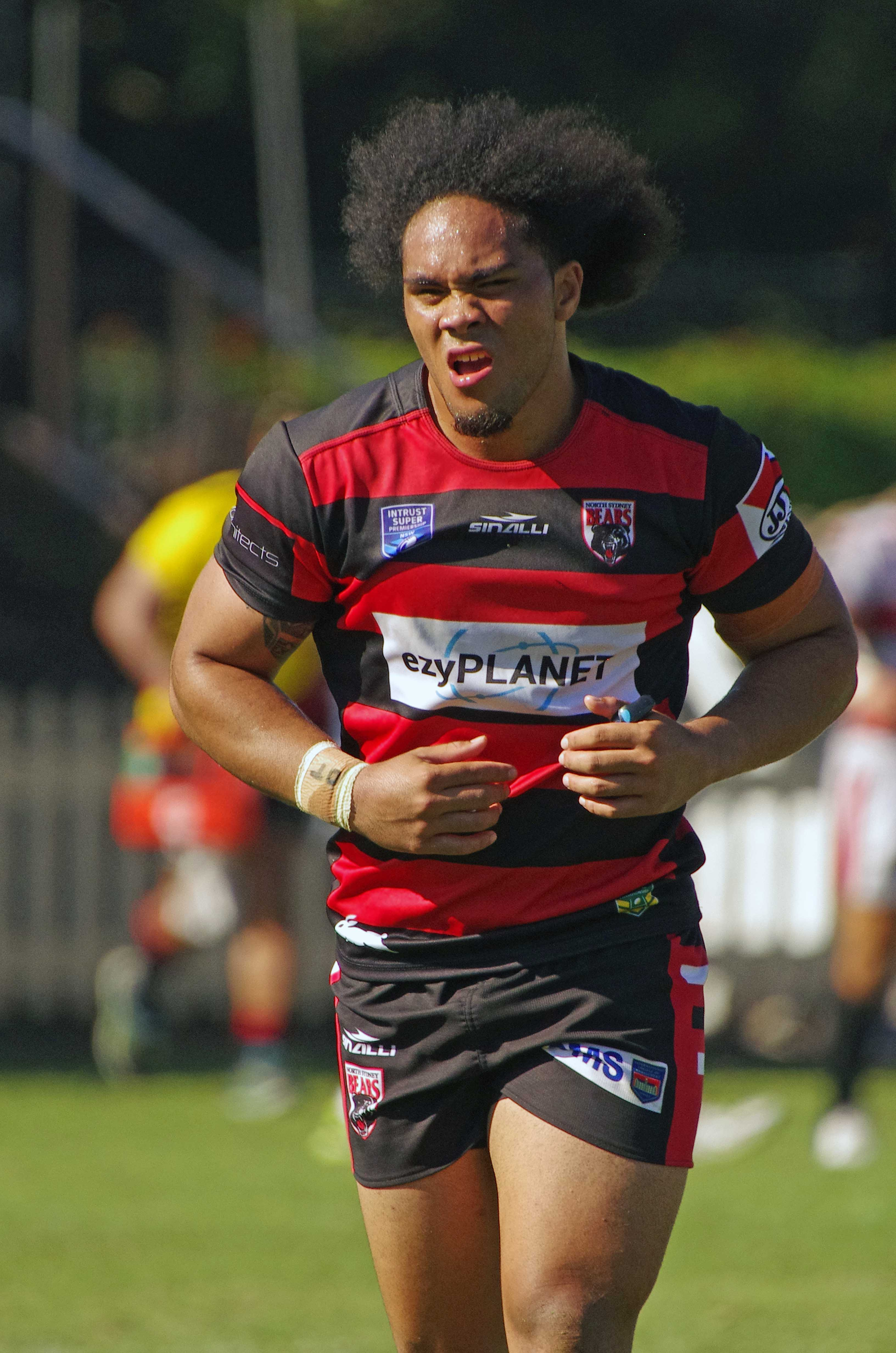
Talakai playing for the North Sydney Bears in 2016

=== 2016 ===
On 7 May, Talakai played for the Junior Kiwis against the Junior Kangaroos. In round 13 of the 2016 NRL season, he made his NRL debut for South Sydney against the Gold Coast Titans, scoring a try with his first touch. He was contracted to South Sydney until the end of 2016.

=== 2017 ===
Talakai was hampered by a knee injury during the 2017 season limiting him to only 8 appearances for the entire season.

=== 2018 ===
Talakai departed Souths mid season in 2018 to sign a contract to join the Penrith Panthers. Talakai was unable to break into the first grade team and spent the remainder of the year playing for Penrith's Intrust Super Premiership NSW side.

=== 2019 ===
In 2019, Talakai joined Newtown after being released by Penrith at the end of 2018. Talakai played for Newtown in their Canterbury Cup NSW grand final victory over the Wentworthville Magpies at Bankwest Stadium.

=== 2020 ===
In round 4 of the 2020 NRL season, Talakai made his debut for Cronulla-Sutherland as they won their first game of the year defeating North Queensland 26-16 at Queensland Country Bank Stadium.

=== 2021 ===
In round 7 of the 2021 NRL season, Talakai was sin-binned for an illegal shoulder charge in Cronulla's 18-12 loss against Canterbury. On 27 April, Talakai was suspended for four matches in relation to the illegal shoulder charge. Talakai played 15 games for Cronulla in the 2021 NRL season which saw the club narrowly miss the finals by finishing 9th on the table.

=== 2022 ===
The 2022 season for Talakai was his best yet, scoring 7 tries and assisting 9 others in the 21 games he played in that season. Due to injuries in the Cronulla backline, Talakai moved from his typical second row position into the centres. In round 7 of the 2022 NRL season, Talakai scored two tries and assisted 3 others for Cronulla in a man of the match performance which saw the club defeat rivals Manly 34-22 in the Battle of the Beaches game.

On 11 June, an arrest warrant was issued for Talakai after he failed to appear in court for driving with an expired licence. It was alleged that Talakai had been stopped by police on Captain Cook Drive at Caringbah where it was discovered he had an expired drivers licence. The media approached the Cronulla club for comment but they stated they were unaware of the incident. The arrest warrant for Talakai was later revoked and the court date was moved for the 23 June.

On 19 June, Talakai was selected by New South Wales for game two of the 2022 State of Origin series. Talakai played off the bench for New South Wales in their 44-12 victory over Queensland.

In Game 3 of the series, Talakai made 2 errors which proved to be costly in New South Wales 22-12 defeat to Queensland at Lang Park.

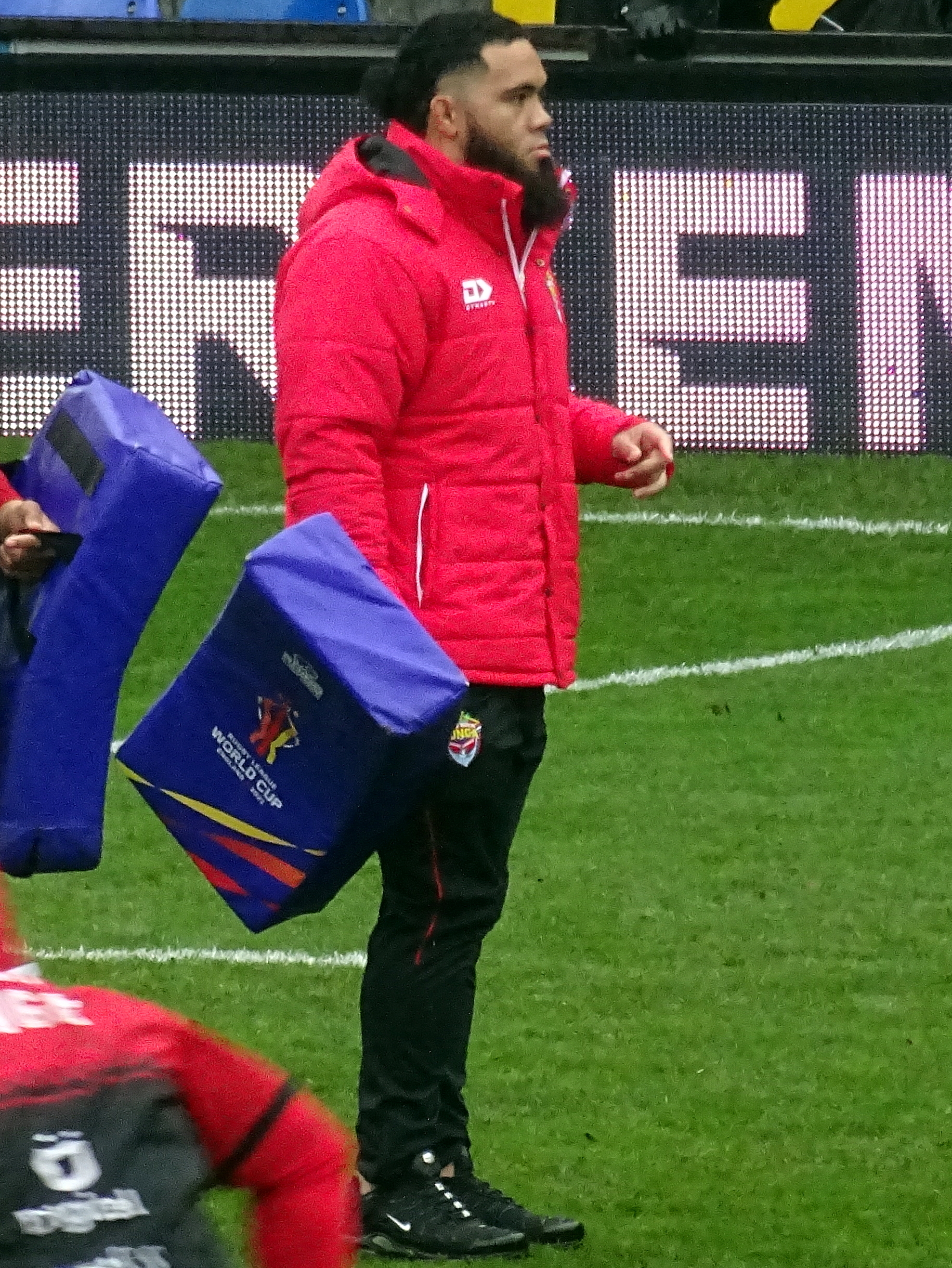
Talakai helping his Tongan colleagues warm up at the 2021 RLWC in 2022

Talakai played 21 games for Cronulla in the 2022 NRL season as they surprised many by finishing second on the table. Talakai played in Cronulla's qualifying final loss to North Queensland in which he scored a try. Talakai did not feature in Cronulla's 38-12 elimination final loss to South Sydney which ended their season.

=== 2023 ===
In round 4 of the 2023 NRL season, Talakai kicked the first goal of his career in Cronulla's 40-8 victory over rivals St. George Illawarra. In round 19, Talakai scored two tries for Cronulla in their 36-12 victory over the Wests Tigers. Talakai played a total of 25 games for Cronulla in the 2023 NRL season as Cronulla finished sixth on the table. Talakai played in the clubs 13-12 upset loss against the Sydney Roosters which ended their season.

=== 2024 ===
From round 4 of the 2024 NRL season, having started his last 43 games at centre, Talakai made a positional change to the forwards due to injuries suffered by other Cronulla players. Replaced at centre by Kayal Iro, Talakai mostly played as an interchange forward, but also started 6 games (as of round 25) at his old position of second-row. Talakai played 24 games for Cronulla in the 2024 NRL season as the club finished 4th on the table and qualified for the finals.

=== 2025 ===
Talakai played 24 games for Cronulla in the 2025 NRL season as the club finished 5th on the table. The club reached the preliminary final for a second consecutive season but lost against Melbourne 22-14.

=== 2026 ===
On 27 February 2026, the Perth Bears announced that Talakai had signed with the club on a three-year deal starting in 2027.

Talakai played 23 matches for Cronulla in the 2026 NRL season as the club finished 5th on the table and qualified for the finals. His final game for the club was their elimination final loss to the Sydney Roosters.

== Statistics ==
=== NRL ===
*denotes season competing

Season	Team	Matches	T	G	GK %	F/G	Pts
2016	South Sydney Rabbitohs	3	1	0	—	0	4
2017	South Sydney Rabbitohs	8	1	0	—	0	4
2020	Cronulla-Sutherland Sharks	16	4	0	—	0	16
2021	Cronulla-Sutherland Sharks	15	1	0	—	0	4
2022	Cronulla-Sutherland Sharks	21	7	0	—	0	28
2023	Cronulla-Sutherland Sharks	22	5	1			22
2024	Cronulla-Sutherland Sharks	24	6				24
2025	Cronulla-Sutherland Sharks	24	2				8
2026	Cronulla-Sutherland Sharks	21	5				20
Career totals		154	32	1	—	0	130

=== State of Origin ===
Season	Team	Matches	T	G	GK %	F/G	Pts
2022	New South Wales	2	0	0	—	0	0
Career totals		2	0	0	—	0	0

=== International ===
Season	Team	Matches	T	G	GK %	F/G	Pts
2022	Tonga	2	0	1	100.00%	0	2
Career totals		2	0	1	100.00%	0	2
