= Connor Tracey =

Australian rugby league footballer (born 1996)

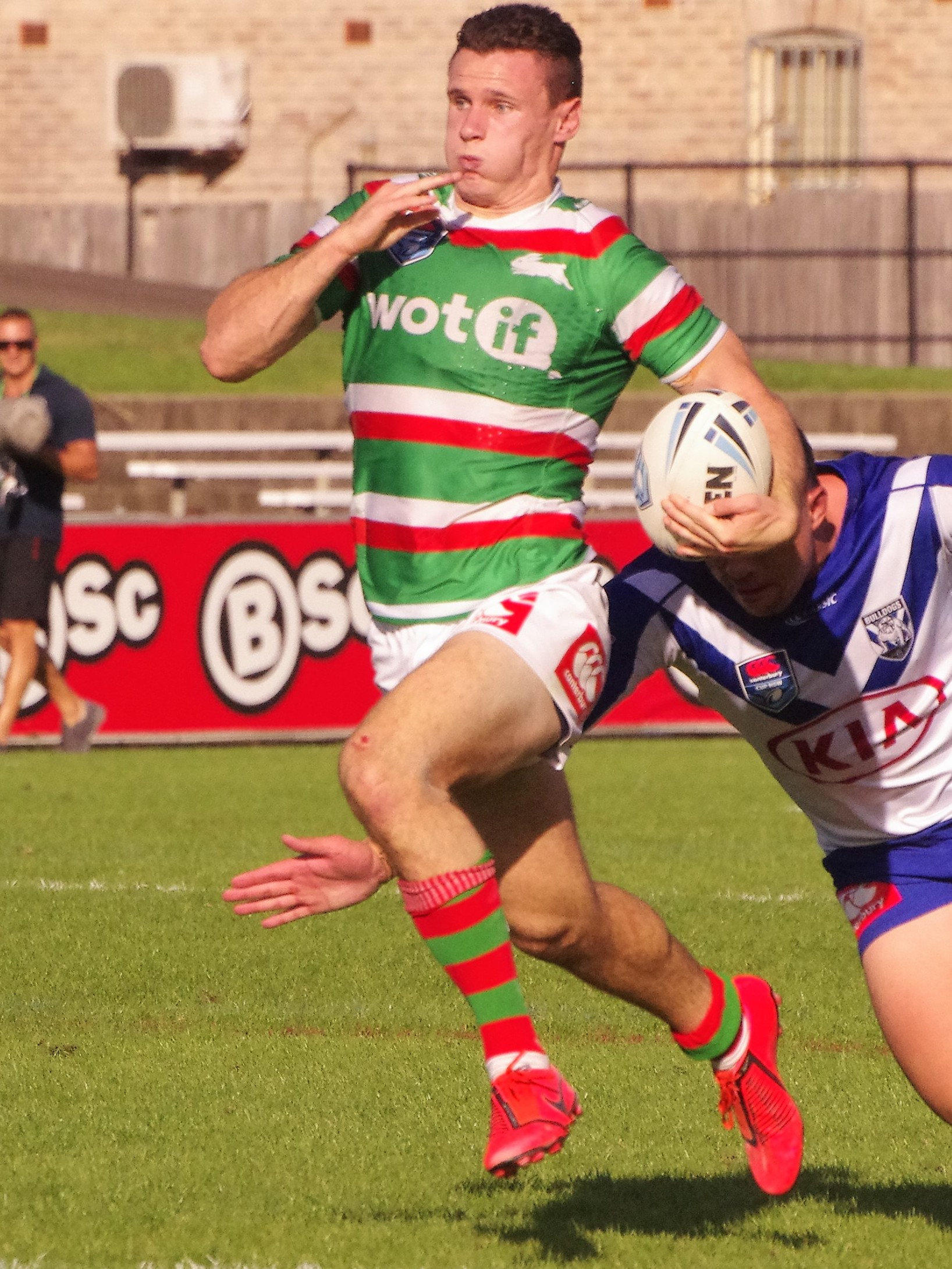

Personal information
- Born: 17 June 1996 (age 30) Sydney, New South Wales, Australia
- Height: 183 cm (6 ft 0 in)
- Weight: 86 kg (13 st 8 lb)

Playing information
- Position: Fullback, Centre, Wing, Five-eighth
Club
Years	Team	Pld	T	G	FG	P
2019	South Sydney	2	0	0	0	0
2020–23	Cronulla Sharks	64	27	0	0	108
2024–	Canterbury Bulldogs	68	15	0	0	60
	Total	134	42	0	0	168
- Source: As of 3 September 2026

Connor Tracey (born 17 June 1996) is an Australian professional rugby league footballer who plays as a fullback for the Canterbury-Bankstown Bulldogs in the National Rugby League (NRL).

He previously played for the Cronulla-Sutherland Sharks and South Sydney Rabbitohs in the NRL. He has played in every backline position as a five-eighth, halfback and centre, winger earlier in his career.

== Background ==
Tracey was born in Sydney, New South Wales, Australia. Connor's father, Craig Tracey played for Cronulla from 1985-88.

== Career ==
=== 2018 ===
Tracey is a local Cronulla-Sutherland junior from the De La Salle Caringbah club. Tracey then signed with South Sydney in 2015 and initially played in the club's Under 20's team. In 2018, Tracey played for South Sydney's feeder club side North Sydney in the Intrust Super Premiership NSW. At the end of the year, Tracey was named as North Sydney's best back. Tracey started the 2019 season for Souths in the Canterbury Cup NSW.

=== 2019 ===
Tracey made his first grade debut in round 12 of the 2019 NRL season for South Sydney in their 26-14 loss to the Parramatta Eels.

On 4 August 2019, it was revealed that Tracey would be departing Souths at the end of the 2019 NRL season after signing with Cronulla-Sutherland for the 2020 season.

On 29 September 2019, Tracey was named in the 2019 Canterbury Cup NSW team of the season.

=== 2020 ===
In round 1 of the 2020 NRL season, he made his debut for Cronulla-Sutherland against South Sydney. In the final minutes of the game, Tracey set up what would have been the match winning try but his pass was deemed to have gone forward. In round 12, he scored his first try in the top grade as Cronulla defeated Brisbane 36-26 at Suncorp Stadium.

=== 2021 ===
In round 4 of the 2021 NRL season, he scored two tries for Cronulla in a 48-10 victory over North Queensland at Kogarah Oval. Following a number of injuries to Cronulla’s usual lineup, Tracey was utilised at both the centre and wing positions, equaling his four-try total from the previous season in his first eight appearances of 2021.

Tracey played 24 games for Cronulla and scored 14 tries in the 2021 NRL season which saw the club narrowly miss the finals by finishing 9th on the table.

=== 2022 ===
In the 2022 NRL season, Cronulla finished second on the table. In the first week of the finals, Cronulla led North Queensland 30-22 with eight minutes to go until Tracey was sin binned for a professional foul on Valentine Holmes. North Queensland would go on to win the match 32-30 in extra-time. Tracey was retained in the Cronulla squad for the following weeks match against South Sydney. Tracey played at centre in Cronulla's 38-12 loss which ended their season.

=== 2023 ===
Tracey played a total of ten games for Cronulla in the 2023 NRL season as they finished sixth on the table. Tracey played in the clubs 13-12 upset loss against the Sydney Roosters which ended their season. In November, Tracey signed a contract to join Canterbury starting in the 2024 NRL season. The move was part of a swap deal with Canterbury releasing Michael Gabrael to head over to the Cronulla club. The following day, it was revealed that Tracey had suffered an injury at training with Cronulla and would be unavailable at his new club for two months.

=== 2024 ===
In round 2 of the 2024 NRL season, Tracey made his club debut for Canterbury against his former club Cronulla. Canterbury would lose the game 25-6. The following week, Tracey scored his first try for the club in a 32-0 victory over the Gold Coast. In round 21, Tracey scored a hat-trick in Canterbury's 41-16 victory over Brisbane. Tracey played 22 games for Canterbury in the 2024 NRL season which saw the club finish 6th on the table and qualify for the finals. Tracey played in the clubs elimination final loss against Manly.

=== 2025 ===
In round 14 of the 2025 NRL season, Tracey played his 100th first-grade match, as Canterbury won 30-12 against arch-rivals the Parramatta Eels. On 29 July, Tracey was ruled out for three weeks with an inferior epigastric artery problem. Tracey played 24 games for Canterbury in the 2025 NRL season as the club finished fourth and qualified for the finals. Canterbury would be eliminated from the finals in straight sets.

=== 2026 ===
On 15 April, Canterbury announced that Tracey had re-signed with the club for a further two years. He played 22 games for the club in the 2026 NRL season as they finished 12th on the table.

== Statistics ==
=== NRL ===
Season	Team	Matches	T	G	GK %	F/G	Pts
2019	South Sydney	2	0	0	—	0	0
2020	Cronulla-Sutherland	16	4	0	—	0	16
2021	Cronulla-Sutherland	24	14	0	—	0	56
2022	Cronulla-Sutherland	14	6	0	—	0	24
2023	Cronulla-Sutherland	10	2	0	—	0	12
2024	Canterbury-Bankstown Bulldogs	22	7	0	—	0	28
2025	Canterbury-Bankstown Bulldogs	24	4				16
2026	Canterbury-Bankstown Bulldogs	15	3				12
Career totals		127	41	0	—	0	164
