= Craig Tracey (rugby league) =

Australian rugby league footballer

Playing information
- Position: Hooker
Club
Years	Team	Pld	T	G	FG	P
1985–1988	Cronulla-Sutherland Sharks	12	0	0	0	0
- Source: As of 10 September 2025

Craig Tracey is an Australian former professional rugby league footballer who played for the Cronulla-Sutherland Sharks in the NSW Rugby League. His son is current Canterbury Bankstown Bulldogs player Connor Tracey.

Tracey played over 100 games for Gymea Junior Rugby League Club. He represented New South Wales and Australia U/18’s in 1982.
