= Braydon Trindall =

Australian rugby league footballer

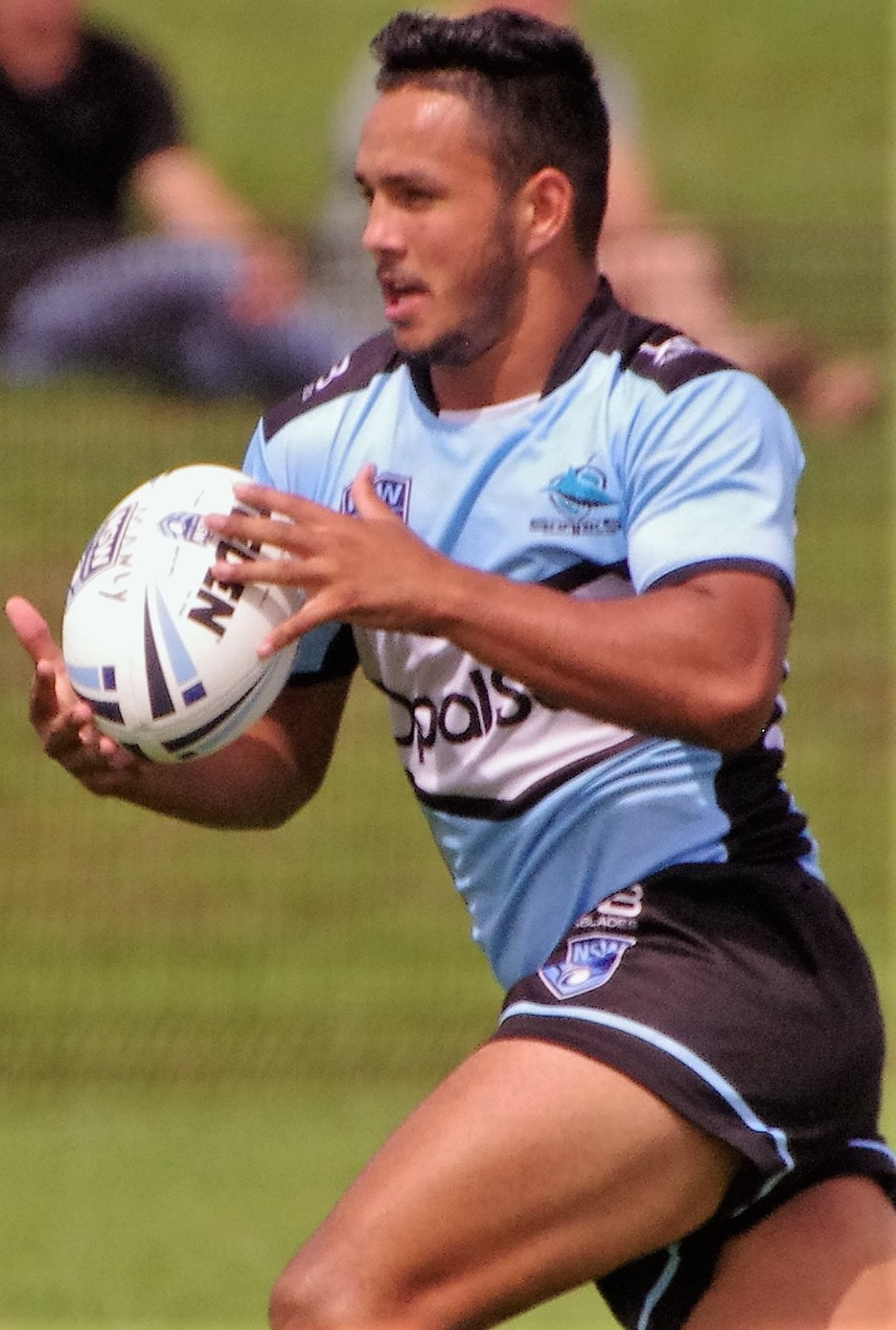

Personal information
- Born: 11 July 1999 (age 27) Wee Waa, New South Wales, Australia
- Height: 180 cm (5 ft 11 in)
- Weight: 90 kg (14 st 2 lb)

Playing information
- Position: Five-eighth, Halfback
Club
Years	Team	Pld	T	G	FG	P
2020–	Cronulla Sharks	120	37	98	4	349
Representative
Years	Team	Pld	T	G	FG	P
2022–24	Indigenous All Stars	3	0	1	0	2
- Source: As of 19 September 2026

Braydon Trindall (born 11 July 1999) is an Australian professional rugby league footballer who plays as a five-eighth or halfback for the Cronulla-Sutherland Sharks in the National Rugby League (NRL).

== Background ==
Born and raised in Wee Waa, New South Wales, Trindall (often nicknamed “Tricky”), who is of Indigenous Australian descent, moved to Queensland at age 12. Tricky played his junior rugby league for the Caboolture Snakes, before being signed by the Melbourne Storm. Braydon Trindall plays knockout football, and has links to Cherbourg.

== Playing career ==
=== 2015 - 2017 ===
In 2015, Trindall played for the Sunshine Coast Falcons in the Cyril Connell Cup and represented the Queensland under-16 team and the Queensland under-16 Murri team. In 2016, he moved up to the Falcons' Mal Meninga Cup side. In 2017, he played for the Melbourne Storm under-20 side, playing 14 games.

=== 2018 ===
In 2018, Trindall joined the Cronulla-Sutherland Sharks, playing for their Jersey Flegg Cup side. On 23 September 2018, he was named man of the match in their Grand Final win over the Penrith Panthers.

=== 2019 ===
In 2019, he spent the season playing for the Newtown Jets, Cronulla's NSW Cup feeder club and represented the Queensland under-20 team. That season, he played in Newtown's NSW Cup Grand Final and NRL State Championship-winning sides.

=== 2020 ===
In round 12 of the 2020 NRL season, Trindall made his debut for Cronulla-Sutherland against the Brisbane Broncos at Suncorp Stadium.

=== 2021 ===
Trindall played 18 games for Cronulla in the 2021 NRL season which saw the club narrowly miss the finals by finishing 9th on the table.

=== 2022 ===
Trindall played a total of 15 games for Cronulla in the 2022 NRL season scoring one try. Trindall did not play in Cronulla's finals campaign which saw them eliminated in the second week.

=== 2023 ===
In round 23 of the 2023 NRL season, Trindall scored two tries for Cronulla in their 26-16 victory over South Sydney. Trindall played a total of 13 games for Cronulla in the 2023 NRL season as Cronulla finished sixth on the table. Trindall played in the clubs 13-12 upset loss against the Sydney Roosters which ended their season.

=== 2024 ===
Trindall was stood down by Cronulla "for the short term" after he failed a roadside alcohol & drugs test on Monday 22 April. On 28 May, Trindall was cleared to play after he pleaded guilty in court. He was fined $1000 by the NRL and handed a three-month driving disqualification. Trindall played 20 games for Cronulla in the 2024 NRL season as the club finished 4th on the table and qualified for the finals. Trindall featured in all three of Cronulla's finals games as the club reached the preliminary final stage but lost against Penrith. On 1 November, Cronulla announced that Trindall had re-signed with the club on a three year deal.

=== 2025 ===
In round 15 of the 2025 NRL season, Trindall scored two tries for Cronulla in their 30-18 victory over rivals St. George Illawarra. Trindall played 26 matches for Cronulla in the 2025 NRL season as the club finished 5th on the table. Cronulla reached the preliminary final for a second consecutive season but lost against Melbourne 22-14.

=== 2026 ===
In round 15 of the 2026 NRL season, Trindall kicked a two point drop goal to win the game for Cronulla against the New Zealand Warriors 10-8. Trindall played 23 matches for Cronulla in the 2026 NRL season as the club finished 5th on the table and qualified for the finals. In the semi-final loss to the Sydney Roosters, Trindall dropped the ball over the line in the second half when the scores were almost even. This proved to be a costly mistake as the Sydney Roosters raced away in the second half to win the match.

== Statistics ==
=== NRL ===
Season	Team	Matches	T	G	GK %	F/G	Pts
2020	Cronulla-Sutherland	5	0	4	66.67%	0	8
2021	Cronulla-Sutherland	18	4	36	81.82%	0	88
2022	Cronulla-Sutherland	15	1	2	33.33%	0	8
2023	Cronulla-Sutherland	13	3	13	72.22%	0	42
2024	Cronulla-Sutherland	20	12	29	70.00%		106
2025	Cronulla-Sutherland	26	7	3		3	37
2026	Cronulla-Sutherland	10	5				20
Career totals		107	33	87	70.00%	3	309

=== All Star ===
Season	Team	Matches	T	G	GK %	F/G	Pts
2022	Indigenous All Stars	1	0	1/1	100%	0	2
2026	Indigenous All Stars	1	0	0		0	0
Career totals		1	0	1	100%	0	2
