= Jade Etherden =

Australian rugby league footballer

Personal information
- Born: 25 April 1995 (age 31) Wollongong, New South Wales, Australia
- Height: 170 cm (5 ft 7 in)
- Weight: 74 kg (11 st 9 lb)

Playing information
- Position: Second-row, Hooker, Halfback
Club
Years	Team	Pld	T	G	FG	P
2020	St George Illawarra	1	0	0	0	0
2021	Parramatta Eels	2	0	0	0	0
	Total	3	0	0	0	0
- Source: As of 5 November 2023

Jade Etherden (born 25 April 1995) is an Australian rugby league footballer who plays as for the Parramatta Eels Women in the NRL Women's Premiership and Mounties RLFC in the NSWRL Women's Premiership.

== Background ==
Etherden was born in Wollongong and played her junior rugby league for the Woonona Bulls before having to give up the sport when she was 12.

== Playing career ==
In 2011, Etherden returned to rugby league, playing for the Corrimal Cougars in the Illawarra Women's Premiership. In 2016, Etherden played for the Cronulla Sharks in a nines exhibition game against the St George Illawarra Dragons. In 2017, she played for the Dragons in a nines exhibition against the Sharks. On 14 May 2017, she represented NSW Country.

In 2019, Etherden joined the Sharks NSWRL Women's Premiership team.

=== 2020 ===
On 23 September, Etherden was announced as a member of the St George Illawarra Dragons NRL Women's Premiership squad. In Round 3 of the 2020 NRL Women's season, she made her debut for the Dragons, starting at halfback in a 10–22 loss to the New Zealand Warriors.
