= Jesse Ramien =

Australian rugby league footballer

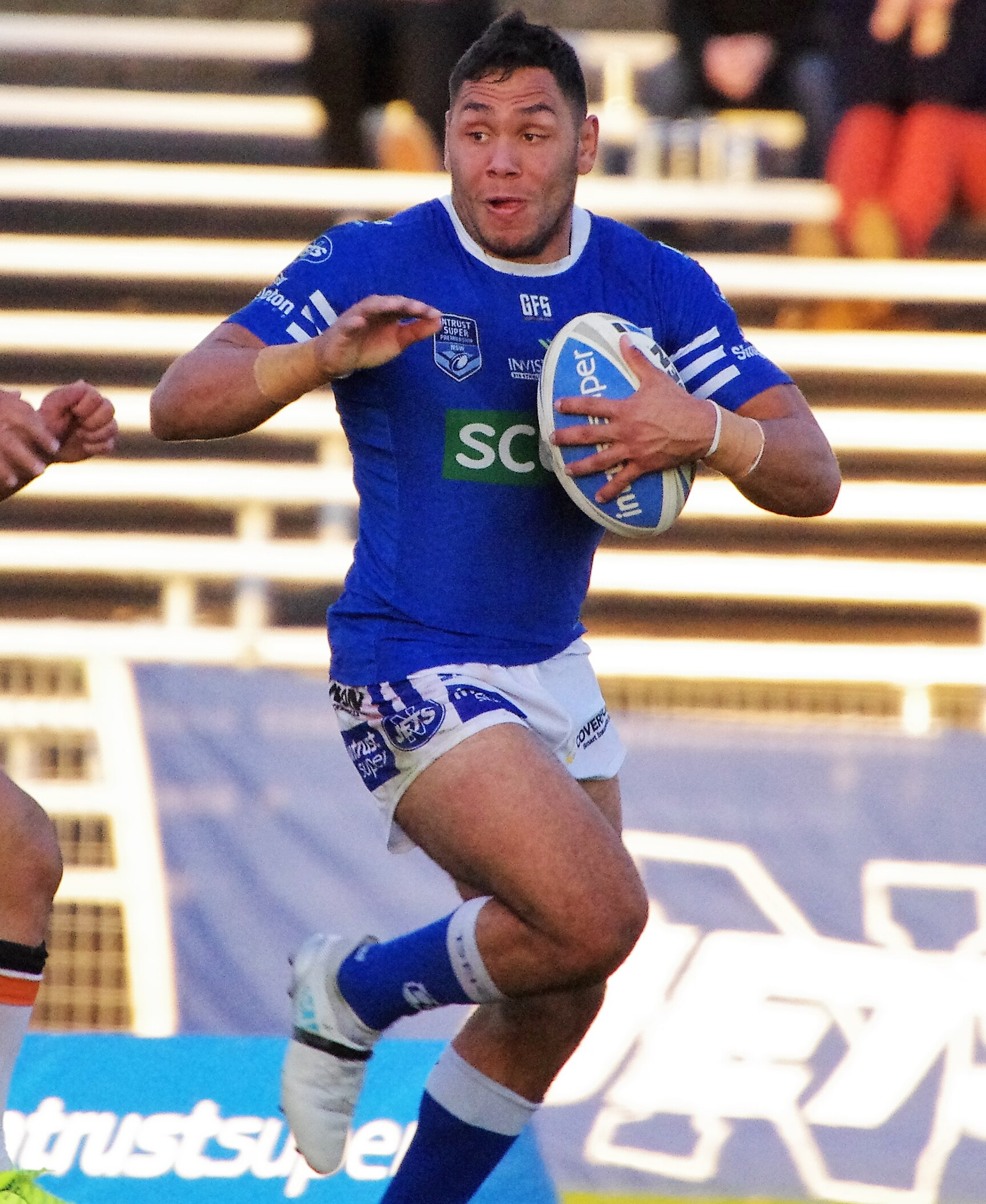

Personal information
- Born: 27 April 1997 (age 29) Dubbo, New South Wales, Australia
- Height: 184 cm (6 ft 0 in)
- Weight: 98 kg (15 st 6 lb)

Playing information
- Position: Centre
Club
| Years | Team | Pld | T | G | FG | P |
|---|---|---|---|---|---|---|
| 2017–18 | Cronulla Sharks | 21 | 11 | 0 | 0 | 44 |
| 2019 | Newcastle Knights | 17 | 2 | 0 | 0 | 8 |
| 2020–26 | Cronulla Sharks | 146 | 49 | 0 | 0 | 196 |
| 2027– | North Queensland Cowboys | 0 | 0 | 0 | 0 | 0 |
| | Total | 184 | 62 | 0 | 0 | 248 |
Representative
| Years | Team | Pld | T | G | FG | P |
| 2018 | Prime Minister's XIII | 1 | 0 | 0 | 0 | 0 |
| 2020–22 | Indigenous All Stars | 4 | 1 | 0 | 0 | 4 |
- Source: As of 9 August 2026

Jesse Ramien (born 27 April 1997) is an Australian professional rugby league footballer who plays as a centre for the North Queensland Cowboys in the National Rugby League (NRL).

He has previously played for the Newcastle Knights as well as a previous spell at the Cronulla club in the NRL. Ramien has also played at representative level for the Indigenous All Stars.

== Background ==
Ramien was born in Dubbo, New South Wales, Australia, and is of Indigenous Australian descent.

He played his junior rugby league for the Coonamble Bears, before being signed by the Manly Warringah Sea Eagles.

== Playing career ==
=== Early career ===
From 2014 to 2016, Ramien played for the Manly Warringah Sea Eagles' NYC team. Mid-season in 2016, he made the switch to the Cronulla-Sutherland Sharks' NYC team.

=== 2017 ===
In February, Ramien played for the Sharks' first-grade side in the 2017 World Club Challenge match against the Wigan Warriors, a game in which he scored a try. In May, he played for the Junior Kangaroos against the Junior Kiwis. In round 26 of the 2017 NRL season, he made his NRL debut for the Sharks against the Newcastle Knights, scoring a try. The very next day, he was named at centre in the Team of the Year.

=== 2018 ===
In February, Ramien signed a 2-year contract with the Newcastle Knights starting in 2019. In round 12 against the Knights, he scored two tries in the Sharks' 48-10 win at Hunter Stadium.

=== 2019 ===
Ramien made his Knights debut in round 1 of the season in Newcastle's 14-8 victory over his former side the Sharks. Throughout the season, there was speculation that he was unhappy playing for the Knights due to a lack of ball passed his way at right centre, the Knights favouring their left edge more. After playing in 17 games and scoring 2 tries, Ramien was left out of the team for their round 20 game following four straight losses for the Knights. It was reported that during the week coach Nathan Brown approached him at training and told him if he was unhappy at the club and wanted to seek an immediate release then Newcastle head of football Brian Canavan could make that happen. The day after, Ramien was granted permission negotiate with other clubs and leave the Knights immediately, however due to it being past the NRL's June 30 mid-season transfer deadline, he would not be allowed to play for another club until the 2020 season.

=== 2020 ===
In round 4 of the 2020 NRL season, Ramien scored two tries as Cronulla-Sutherland won their first game of the year defeating North Queensland 26-16 at Queensland Country Bank Stadium.

=== 2021 ===
Ramien made 17 appearances for Cronulla in the 2021 NRL season which saw the club narrowly miss the finals by finishing 9th on the table.

=== 2022 ===
In round 9 of the 2022 NRL season, Ramien was sent to the sin bin for an illegal shoulder charge during the clubs victory over the New Zealand Warriors. Cronulla won the game despite being down to 11 men. In round 17, Ramien scored a hat-trick in Cronulla's 28-6 victory over Melbourne. Ramien played a total of 23 games for Cronulla in 2022 scoring ten tries. Ramien played in both of Cronulla's finals matches which saw the club eliminated in straight sets.

=== 2023 ===
In round 4 of the 2023 NRL season, Ramien scored two tries for Cronulla in their 40-8 victory over rivals St. George Illawarra. Ramien played a total of 25 games for Cronulla in the 2023 NRL season as they finished sixth on the table. Ramien played in the clubs 13-12 upset loss against the Sydney Roosters which ended their season.

=== 2024 ===
Ramien played 24 games for Cronulla in the 2024 NRL season as the club finished 4th on the table and qualified for the finals. Ramien played in all three of Cronulla's finals matches including their preliminary final loss against Penrith.

=== 2025 ===
Ramien played 24 games for Cronulla in the 2025 NRL season as the club finished 5th on the table. The club reached the preliminary final for a second consecutive season but lost against Melbourne 22-14.

=== 2026 ===
On 26 May 2026, the North Queensland outfit announced the signing of Ramien on a two-year deal. Ramien played 14 matches for Cronulla in the 2026 NRL season as the club finished 5th on the table and qualified for the finals.

== Statistics ==
=== NRL ===
| Season | Team | Matches | T | G | GK % | F/G | Pts |
|---|---|---|---|---|---|---|---|
| 2017 | Cronulla-Sutherland | 1 | 1 | 0 | — | 0 | 4 |
| 2018 | Cronulla-Sutherland | 20 | 10 | 0 | — | 0 | 40 |
| 2019 | Newcastle Knights | 17 | 2 | 0 | — | 0 | 8 |
| 2020 | Cronulla-Sutherland | 19 | 8 | 0 | — | 0 | 32 |
| 2021 | Cronulla-Sutherland | 17 | 5 | 0 | — | 0 | 20 |
| 2022 | Cronulla-Sutherland | 23 | 10 | 0 | — | 0 | 40 |
| 2023 | Cronulla-Sutherland | 25 | 11 | | | | 44 |
| 2024 | Cronulla-Sutherland | 24 | 6 | | | | 24 |
| 2025 | Cronulla-Sutherland | 24 | 3 | | | | 12 |
| 2026 | Cronulla-Sutherland | 4 | 2 | | | | 8 |
| Career totals | | 174 | 58 | 0 | — | 0 | 232 |

=== All Star ===
| Season | Team | Matches | T | G | GK % | F/G | Pts |
|---|---|---|---|---|---|---|---|
| 2019 | Indigenous All Stars | 1 | 0 | 0 | — | 0 | 0 |
| 2020 | Indigenous All Stars | 1 | 0 | 0 | — | 0 | 0 |
| 2022 | Indigenous All Stars | 1 | 1 | 0 | — | 0 | 4 |
| Career totals | | 3 | 1 | 0 | — | 0 | 4 |
