= Daniel Vasquez =

Chile international rugby league footballer

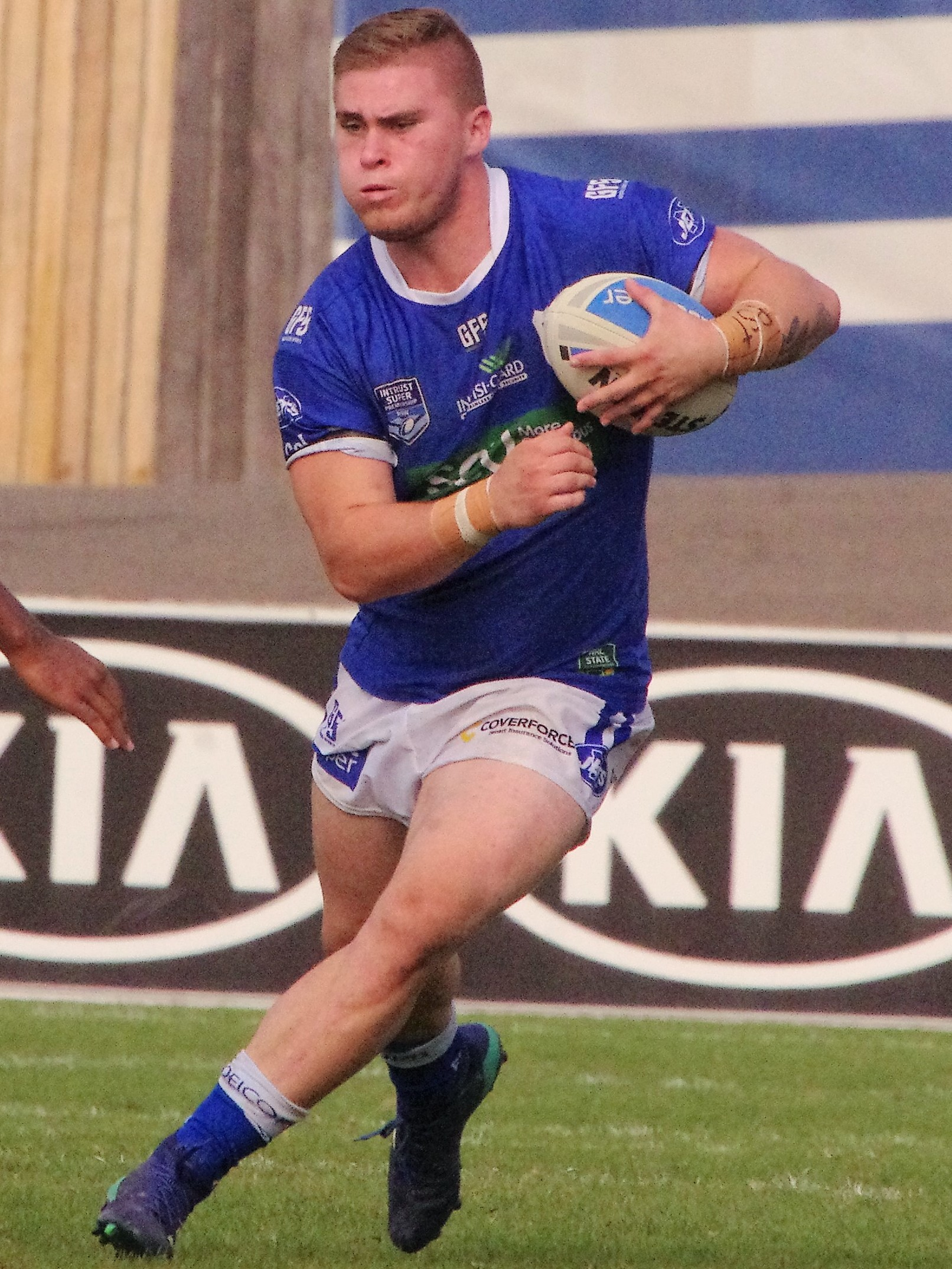

Personal information
- Born: 21 July 1997 (age 29) Cronulla, New South Wales, Australia
- Height: 190 cm (6 ft 3 in)
- Weight: 107 kg (16 st 12 lb)

Playing information
- Position: Prop
Club
Years	Team	Pld	T	G	FG	P
2020	Cronulla Sharks	1	0	0	0	0
Representative
Years	Team	Pld	T	G	FG	P
2022–24	Chile	4	4	0	0	16
- Source: As of 19 November 2026

Daniel Vasquez (born 21 July 1997) is a Chilean international rugby league footballer who plays as a prop.

He has previously played for the Cronulla-Sutherland Sharks in the NRL.

== Background ==
Vasquez is of Chilean descent. He played his junior rugby league for the Yarrawarrah Tigers.

== Career ==
Vasquez made his NRL debut in round 20 of the 2020 NRL season for Cronulla-Sutherland against the Canberra Raiders at Kogarah Oval.

Vasquez represented the Chilean national team at the 2022 South American Championship.

== Personal life ==
Vasquez is a constable in the New South Wales Police Force. He was dating fellow constable Mia Lay at the time of her death; Lay was killed in a car crash while on duty on 25 September 2026.
