= John Morris (rugby league) =

Australian rugby league footballer and coach

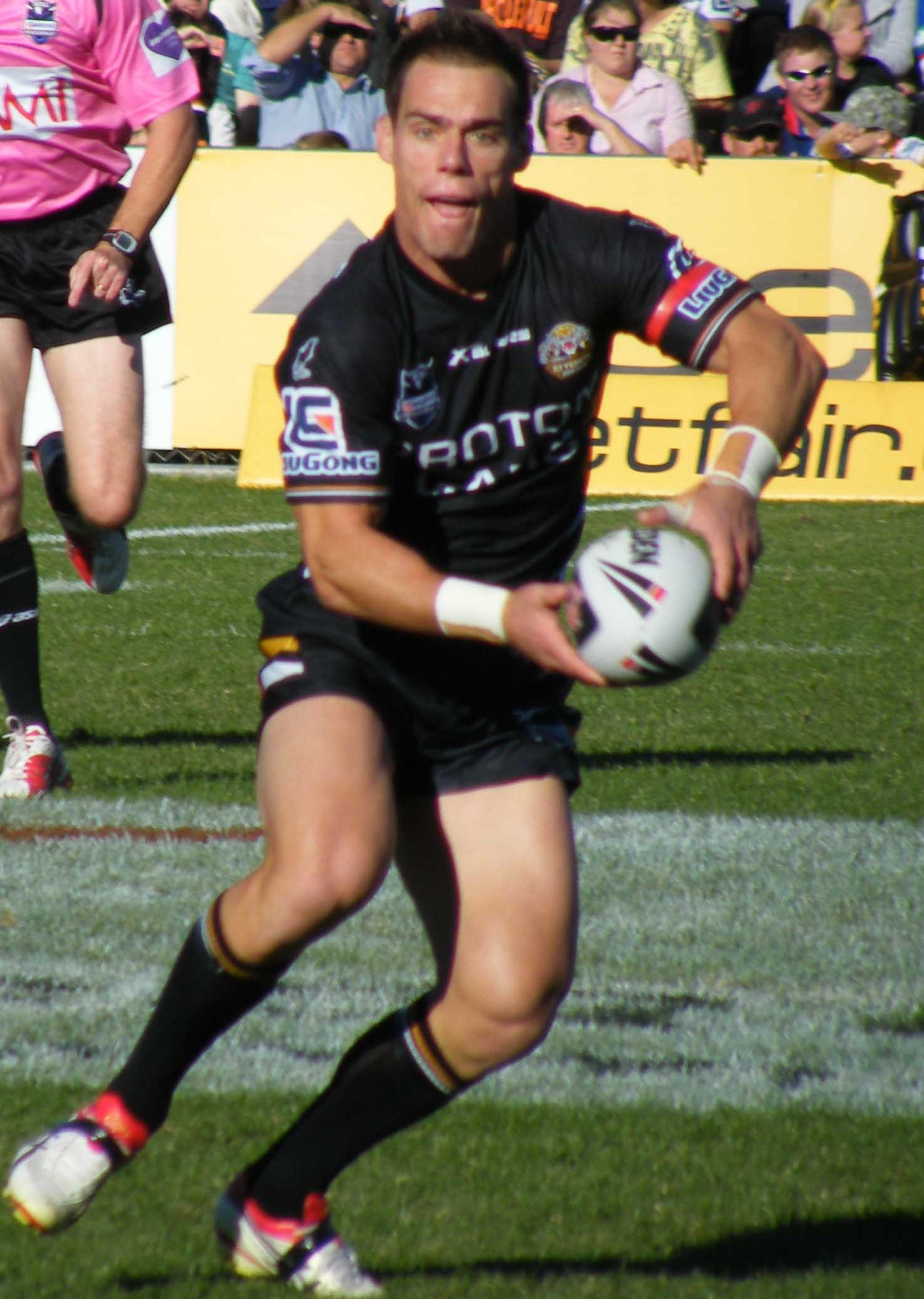

Personal information
- Full name: John Andrew Morris
- Born: 29 July 1980 (age 46) Scone, New South Wales, Australia

Playing information
- Height: 183 cm (6 ft 0 in)
- Weight: 90 kg (14 st 2 lb)
- Position: Hooker, Five-eighth, Halfback
Club
Years	Team	Pld	T	G	FG	P
2001–02	Newcastle Knights	31	11	0	0	44
2003–06	Parramatta Eels	92	18	10	3	95
2007–09	Wests Tigers	72	11	0	1	45
2010–14	Cronulla Sharks	105	9	0	1	37
	Total	300	49	10	5	221
Representative
Years	Team	Pld	T	G	FG	P
2002–03	NSW Country	2	0	0	0	0

Coaching information
Club
Years	Team	Gms	W	D	L	W%
2019–21	Cronulla Sharks	51	24	0	27	47
- Relatives: Teig Wilton (nephew)

John Morris (born 29 July 1980), is an Australian professional rugby league coach who is the Assistant Coach and defence coach for Wests Tigers and a former professional rugby league footballer.

He previously played as a hooker or five-eighth for the Newcastle Knights, Parramatta Eels, Wests Tigers and the Cronulla-Sutherland Sharks in the National Rugby League. Morris was selected on the bench for Country Origin to play City Origin in 2002 and 2003.

== Background ==
Morris was born in Scone, New South Wales, Australia. He is the uncle of Cronulla Sharks player Teig Wilton.

== Playing career ==
Morris played for the Scone Thoroughbreds in his junior years. He made his NRL debut in round 17 of the 2001 NRL season for the Newcastle Knights against the Parramatta Eels at Parramatta Stadium on 22 June 2001.

Having won the 2001 NRL Premiership, which Morris did not feature in, the Newcastle club travelled to England to play the 2002 World Club Challenge against Super League champions, the Bradford Bulls. Morris was selected to play from the interchange bench in Newcastle's loss.

Morris played for NSW Country in 2002 and in 2003. Between 2003 and 2006, Morris played for Parramatta primarily at five-eighth and won the Minor Premiership with the club in the 2005 NRL season. Morris played in Parramatta's 2005 shock 0-29 preliminary final defeat by North Queensland.

In 2007, Morris switched from Parramatta to the Wests Tigers on a three-year contract. He was bought as a replacement for the recently departed Scott Prince. He played 72 games for the Tigers during this period, never missing a game.

In 2009 he signed a two-year deal with the Cronulla-Sutherland Sharks commencing in 2010. In the 2013 finals series, Morris pulled off a try saving tackle on North Queensland player Kane Linnett in the final seconds of play as Cronulla-Sutherland won 20–18 at the Sydney Football Stadium.

On 26 May 2014, Morris played his 300th NRL career game against the South Sydney Rabbitohs with the match finishing in an 18–0 loss at Shark Park. Morris played 11 games in the 2014 NRL season which would be his last as a player. Cronulla finished the year bottom of the table and claimed the Wooden Spoon.

== Coaching career ==
=== Cronulla-Sutherland Sharks ===
In 2017, Morris became the new NYC coach for Cronulla and guided the side to the minor premiership before crashing out of the finals series. At the end of 2017, Morris was named NYC coach of the season. On 3 January 2019, Morris was named interim head coach of Cronulla after Shane Flanagan was de-registered by the NRL for breaching conditions of a suspension handed down in 2014.

On 31 January 2019, it was announced that Morris would be Cronulla's new full time coach going into the 2019 season.

In his first season as Cronulla coach, Morris guided the club to a 7th-placed finish at the end of the 2019 regular season. Cronulla were eliminated from the finals in the first week losing to Manly 28–16 at Brookvale Oval.

In the 2020 NRL season, Morris guided Cronulla to an 8th-placed finish and qualified for the finals. The club were eliminated in the first week of the finals by Canberra.

On 13 April 2021, it was announced Morris would leave Cronulla-Sutherland effective immediately with Josh Hannay to take over for the rest of the 2021 season pending the arrival of Sydney Roosters assistant coach Craig Fitzgibbon as the new head coach starting in 2022.

=== South Sydney Rabbitohs ===
On 15 July 2021, just over three months after leaving Cronulla-Sutherland, Morris signed with the South Sydney Rabbitohs as deputy to new head coach Jason Demetriou for the 2022 and 2023 NRL seasons.

=== Wests Tigers ===
On 23 August 2023, Morris announced that he would be joining the Wests Tigers as assistant coach starting in 2024. Morris left South Sydney along with Sam Burgess after a public fallout which involved South Sydney head coach Jason Demetriou. It was reported that Morris and Burgess clashed with Demetriou over training and player standards. Morris has previously played with Marshall at Wests Tigers.
