= Briton Nikora =

New Zealand international rugby league footballer

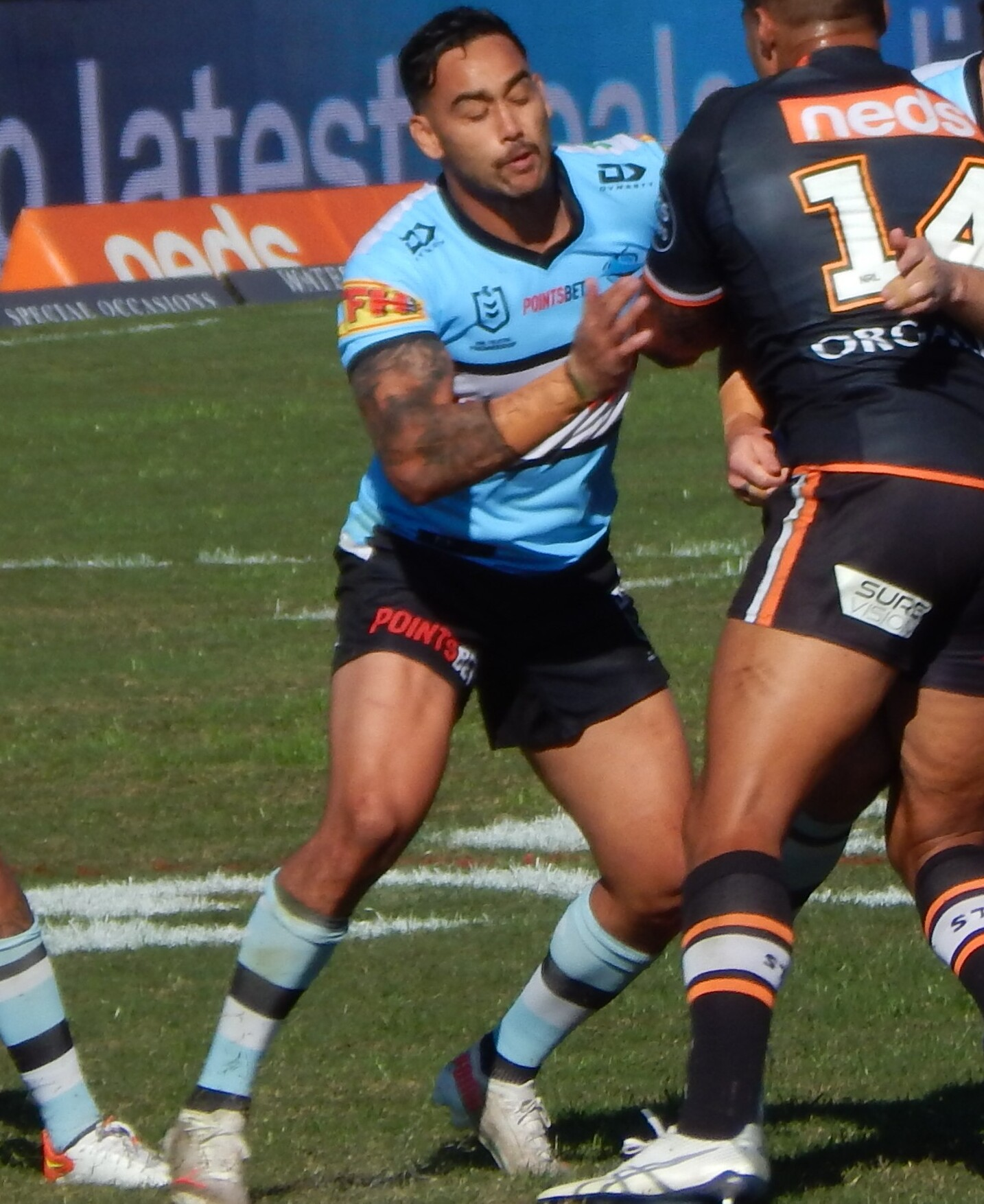

Personal information
- Full name: Briton Nikora
- Born: 7 December 1997 (age 28) Tauranga, New Zealand
- Height: 185 cm (6 ft 1 in)
- Weight: 94 kg (14 st 11 lb)

Playing information
- Position: Second-row
Club
Years	Team	Pld	T	G	FG	P
2019–	Cronulla Sharks	180	53	0	0	212
Representative
Years	Team	Pld	T	G	FG	P
2019–	New Zealand	20	6	0	0	24
2020–24	Māori All Stars	5	0	0	0	0
2026	Queensland	3	0	0	0	0
- Source: As of 15 November 2026

Briton Nikora (born 7 December 1997) is a New Zealand professional rugby league footballer who plays as a second-row forward for the Cronulla-Sutherland Sharks in the National Rugby League and New Zealand and the New Zealand Māori at international level. Regarded as one of the best back-rowers in the game, he is known for his power, speed, and ability to break up opposition defence.

== Background ==
Nikora was born in Mount Maunganui, Tauranga, New Zealand. In 2007, he moved to the Gold Coast, Queensland with his family, where he attended Keebra Park State High School. In Queensland, he played his junior rugby league for the Parkwood Sharks.

== Playing career ==
=== 2018 ===
Nikora played his junior football at Keebra Park on the Gold Coast, before being signed by the Cronulla-Sutherland Sharks. Nikora played in Cronulla's Holden cup teams in 2016 & the 2017 Junior Kiwis, in 2018 he was named in Cronulla's first grade squad and played Canterbury Cup NSW for Cronulla's feeder club Newtown.

=== 2019 ===
On 15 March 2019 Nikora made his NRL debut for Cronulla-Sutherland against the Newcastle Knights at Hunter stadium in a 14-8 loss. Nikora made 24 appearances for Cronulla in the 2019 NRL season as the club finished 7th on the table and qualified for the finals. Nikora played in the club's elimination final defeat against Manly at Brookvale Oval.

=== 2020 ===
In round 20 of the 2020 NRL season, Nikora scored two tries in a 38-28 loss to Canberra at Kogarah Oval. The result saw Cronulla finish 8th on the table and qualify for the finals.

=== 2021 ===
Nikora played 22 games for Cronulla in the 2021 NRL season which saw the club narrowly miss the finals by finishing 9th on the table.

=== 2022 ===
In round 25 of the 2022 NRL season, Nikora scored a hat-trick in Cronulla's 38-16 victory over Newcastle. Nikora played 24 games for Cronulla throughout the season as the club finished second on the table. Nikora played in both finals games as Cronulla were eliminated in straight sets.

=== 2023 ===
Nikora played a total of 25 games for Cronulla in the 2023 NRL season as they finished sixth on the table. Nikora played in the clubs 13-12 upset loss against the Sydney Roosters which ended their season.

=== 2024 ===
In round 27 of the 2024 NRL season, Nikora scored two tries for Cronulla in their 40-20 victory over Manly in the "Battle of the Beaches" game. Nikora played 25 games for Cronulla in the 2024 NRL season as the club finished 4th on the table and qualified for the finals. Nikora played in all three of Cronulla's finals matches including their preliminary final loss against Penrith. On 8 November, the Sharks announced that Nikora had re-signed with the club until the end of 2027.

=== 2025 ===
In round 5 of the 2025 NRL season, Nikora scored two tries for Cronulla in their narrow 24-20 loss against Canberra. Nikora played 23 games for Cronulla in the 2025 NRL season as the club finished 5th on the table. The club reached the preliminary final for a second consecutive season but lost against Melbourne 22-14.

=== 2026 ===
He made his Queensland debut in Game 1 of the 2026 State of Origin on 27 May 2026, coming off the bench, in the 22-20 defeat. Nikora played 21 matches for Cronulla in the 2026 NRL season as the club finished 5th on the table and qualified for the finals.

== Statistics ==
=== NRL ===
*denotes season competing

Season	Team	Matches	T	G	GK %	F/G	Pts
2019	Cronulla-Sutherland	24	7	0	—	0	28
2020	Cronulla-Sutherland	16	6	0	—	0	24
2021	Cronulla-Sutherland	22	4	0	—	0	16
2022	Cronulla-Sutherland	24	8	0	—	0	32
2023	Cronulla-Sutherland	25	8				32
2024	Cronulla-Sutherland	25	10				40
2025	Cronulla-Sutherland	23	7				28
2026	Cronulla-Sutherland	3	1				4
Career totals		162	51	0	—	0	204

=== All Star ===
Season	Team	Matches	T	G	GK %	F/G	Pts
2020	Māori All Stars	1	0	0	—	0	0
2021	Māori All Stars	1	0	0	—	0	0
2022	Māori All Stars	1	0	0	—	0	0
2024	Māori All Stars	1					
Career totals		4	0	0	—	0	0

=== International ===
Season	Team	Matches	T	G	GK %	F/G	Pts
2019	New Zealand	4	0	0	—	0	0
2022	New Zealand	5	2	0	—	0	8
2023	New Zealand	3	1				4
Career totals		12	3	0	—	0	12
