= 2020 All Stars match =

Australian rugby league match

The 2020 All Stars match day was an annual pre-season fixture of Men's and Women's All Stars matches of Australian rugby league. Both games were played on 22 February 2020 at Queensland's Cbus Super Stadium, the original venue the fixture was first played at. The matches were played between the Indigenous All Stars and the Māori All Stars.

== Men's All Stars match ==
This was the Ninth Men's All Star Game

2020 All Stars match
Indigenous All Stars	Māori All Stars
16	30
	1	2	3	4	Total
IND	6	4	6	0	16
MĀO	6	6	0	18	30
- Date: 22 February 2020
- Stadium: Cbus Super Stadium
- Location: Gold Coast, Queensland
- Preston Campbell Medal: Brandon Smith
- Referee: Gerard Sutton, Peter Gough
- Attendance: 23,599

Broadcast partners
- Broadcasters: Nine Network Fox League
- Commentators: Mat Thompson Paul Vautin Andrew Johns

=== Teams ===
INDIGENOUS ALL STARS	Position	MĀORI ALL STARS
Latrell Mitchell	Fullback	Kalyn Ponga
Blake Ferguson	Wing	Dallin Watene-Zelezniak (c)
James Roberts	Centre	Esan Marsters
Jesse Ramien	Centre	Dylan Walker
Josh Addo-Carr	Wing	Bryson Goodwin^{5}
Jack Wighton^{3}	Five-eighth	Kodi Nikorima
Tyrone Roberts	Halfback	Jahrome Hughes
Josh Kerr^{2}	Prop	Jesse Bromwich
Nathan Peats	Hooker	Brandon Smith
Jamayne Taunoa-Brown^{1}	Prop	Adam Blair (c)
Joel Thompson (c)	2nd Row	Kenny Bromwich
Wade Graham	2nd Row	Briton Nikora
David Fifita	Lock	Corey Harawira-Naera
Connor Watson	Interchange	Issac Luke
Chris Smith^{4}	Interchange	Brad Takairangi
Zac Saddler	Interchange	Zane Tetevano
Joshua Curran	Interchange	Jordan Riki^{6}
Alex Johnston	Interchange	Kevin Proctor
Tyrone Peachey	Interchange	Malakai Watene-Zelezniak
Tyrell Fuimaono	Interchange	Pasami Saulo^{7}
Laurie Daley	Coach	David Kidwell

^{1} - Ryan James was originally selected to play but withdrew due to injury. He was replaced by Jamayne Taunoa-Brown.
^{2} - Andrew Fifita was originally selected to play but withdrew due to injury. Josh Kerr was moved from the bench to Prop and Andrew Fifita was replaced by Zac Saddler.
^{3} - Cody Walker was originally selected to play but withdrew due to injury. Jack Wighton was moved from Centre to Five-eighth, Cody Walker was replaced by Tyrell Fuimaono and the captaincy of the Indigenous All Stars was handed to Joel Thompson.
^{4} - Adam Elliott was originally selected to play but withdrew due to injury. He was replaced by Chris Smith.
^{5} - Bailey Simonsson was originally selected to play but withdrew. He was replaced by Bryson Goodwin.
^{6} - Nelson Asofa-Solomona was originally selected to play but withdrew due to injury. He was replaced by Jordan Riki.
^{7} - James Tamou was originally selected to play but withdrew due to injury. He was replaced by Pasami Saulo.

=== Result ===
22 February 2020
19:20 AEST (UTC+10)

Indigenous All Stars	16 – 30	(Māori people) Māori All Stars
Tries: 3 Curran 18'; Ferguson 40'; J Roberts 57'; Goals: 2 T Roberts 20' (1/2); Ferguson 58' (1/1)	1st: 6-6; 2nd: 4–6; 3rd: 6–0; 4th: 0–18; Report	Tries: 5 Smith 70', 75'; Watene-Zelezniak 5'; Nikorima 27'; Walker 80'; Goals: 5 Ponga 6', 29', 71', 75' (4/4); Blair 80' (1/1); Sin Bin: 1 Hughes 23'

Cbus Super Stadium
Attendance: 23,599
Referee: Gerard Sutton, Peter Gough
Preston Campbell Medal: Brandon Smith (Māori All Stars)

== Women's All Stars match ==
For the eighth time, a Women's All Stars match was held on 22 February 2020.

2020 Women All Stars match
Indigenous Women's All Stars	Maori Women's All Stars
10	4
	1	2	3	4	Total
IND	4	0	6	0	10
MAO	4	0	0	0	4
- Date: Saturday 22 February 2020
- Stadium: Cbus Super Stadium
- Location: Gold Coast, Queensland
- Referees: Liam Kennedy, Kasey Badger

Broadcast partners
- Broadcasters: Fox League

=== Teams ===
INDIGENOUS WOMEN'S ALL STARS	Position	MĀORI WOMEN'S ALL STARS
Shakiah Tungai	Fullback	Botille Vette-Welsh
Nakia Davis-Welsh	Wing	Kiana Takairangi
Stephanie Mooka	Centre	Kerehitina Matua
Rhiannon Revell-Blair	Centre	Corban McGregor
Bobbi Law	Wing	Amber Kani
Simone Smith	Five-eighth	Racene McGregor
Jenni-Sue Hoepper	Halfback	Sarina Clark
Rebecca Young	Prop	Kararaina Wira-Kohu
Kelsey Parkin	Hooker	Krystal Rota
Caitlan Johnston	Prop	Harata Butler
Kaitlyn Phillips	2nd Row	Kathleen Wharton
Shaylee Bent	2nd Row	Geneva Webber
Tallisha Harden	Lock	Christyl Stowers
Quincy Dodd	Interchange	Tanika-Jazz Noble
Jasmin Allende	Interchange	Laishon Jones
Shaniah Power	Interchange	Jonsal Tautari
Layla Fauid	Interchange	Maddison Weatherall
Tanika Marshall	Interchange	Capri Paekau
Ben Jeffries	Coach	Rusty Matua

=== Results ===
22 February 2020

Indigenous Women's All Stars	10-4	(Māori people) Maori Women's All Stars
Tries: Stephanie Mooka 12', Nakia Davis-Welsh 47'; Goals: Shakiah Tungai (0/1), Jenni-Sue Hooper (1/1)	Report	Tries: Kerehitina Matua 2'; Goals: Kerehitina Matua (0/1)

Cbus Super Stadium
Referees: Liam Kennedy, Kasey Badger
