= Jackson Ferris (rugby league) =

New Zealand rugby league footballer (born 1998)

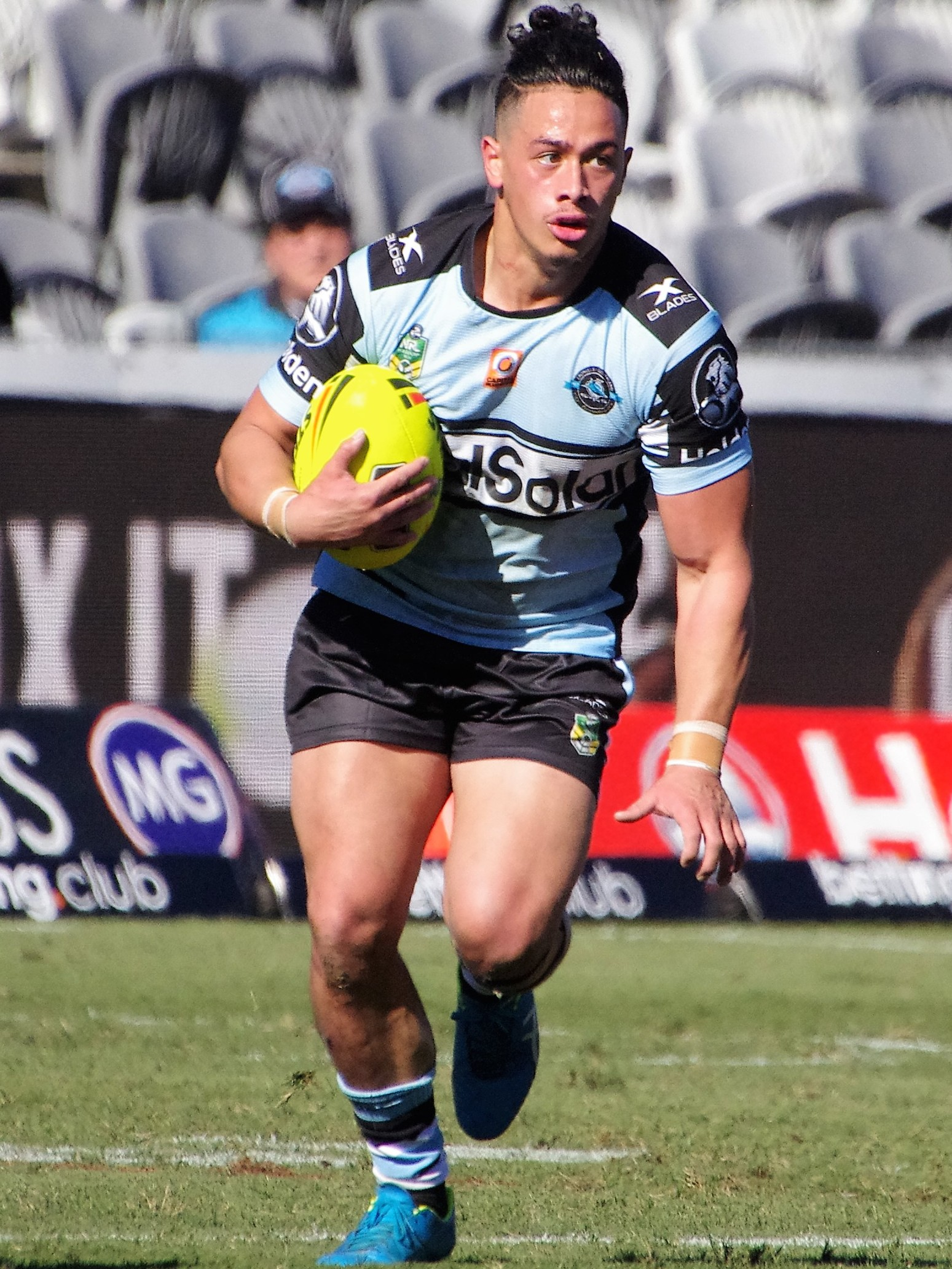

Personal information
- Born: 25 February 1998 (age 28) Palmerston North, New Zealand
- Height: 179 cm (5 ft 10 in)
- Weight: 96 kg (15 st 2 lb)

Playing information
- Position: Centre, Wing
Club
Years	Team	Pld	T	G	FG	P
2020	Cronulla Sharks	1	1	0	0	4
- Source: As of 11 October 2020

Jackson Ferris (born 25 February 1998) is a professional rugby league footballer who plays as a centre.

He previously played for the Cronulla-Sutherland Sharks in the National Rugby League.

== Background ==
Ferris played his junior rugby league for the Kia Ora Warriors and Gymea Gorillas.

== Career ==
=== 2020 ===
Ferris made his first grade debut in round 12 of the 2020 NRL season for Cronulla-Sutherland against the Brisbane Broncos. He scored a try on debut in a 36–26 victory.

=== 2022 ===
Ferris played for Glebe in the Ron Massey Cup during 2022. On 16 December, Ferris signed a train and trial contract with Manly ahead of the 2023 NRL season.
