= 2020 South Sydney Rabbitohs season =

- NRL Rank: 6th
- Play-off result: preliminary Final
- 2020 record: Wins: 10; draws: 0; losses: 10
- Points scored: For: 521; against: 352

Team information
- CEO: Blake Solly
- Head Coach: Wayne Bennett (First Grade); Ben Rogers (Reserve Grade); Joe O'Callaghan (Under-20s); Dean Widders (Women); Wayne Collins (Under-18s); Gavin Sheehan (Under-16s)
- Captain: Adam Reynolds
- Stadium: ANZ Stadium (Round 1, 0-0); Bankwest Stadium (Round 3

Top scorers
- Tries: (tries)
← 2019	List of seasons	2021 →

The 2020 season is the 113th in the history of the South Sydney Rabbitohs. Coached by Wayne Bennett and captained by Adam Reynolds, they compete in the National Rugby League's 2020 Telstra Premiership.

== Squad movements ==
=== Players ===
==== Gains ====
Player	Signed from	Until	Reference
Jai Arrow	Gold Coast Titans	2024	
Jed Cartwright	Penrith Panthers	2023	
Troy Dargan	Brisbane Broncos	2021	
Edene Gebbie	Wynnum Manly Seagulls	2021	
CJ Mundine	St George Illawarra Dragons	2021	
James Roberts	Brisbane Broncos	2021	
Jaydn Su'A	Brisbane Broncos	2021	
Latrell Mitchell	Sydney Roosters	2021	
Jack Johns	Newcastle Knights	2020	
Steven Marsters	St George Illawarra Dragons	2020	

==== Losses ====
Player	2020 club	Reference
Adam Doueihi	Wests Tigers	
Bryson Goodwin	Cronulla-Sutherland Sharks	
Connor Tracey	Cronulla-Sutherland Sharks	
Mawene Hiroti	Cronulla-Sutherland Sharks	
Dean Britt	Canterbury-Bankstown Bulldogs	
George Burgess	Wigan Warriors	
Rhys Kennedy	Brisbane Broncos	
Billy Brittain	St George Illawarra Dragons	
Jacob Gagan	Released	
Kyle Turner	Released	
Sam Burgess	Retired	
Greg Inglis	Retired	
Ethan Lowe	Retired	
John Sutton	Retired	

==== Re-signings ====
Player	Signed until	Reference
Cameron Murray	2025	
Campbell Graham	2024	
Hame Sele	2023	
Liam Knight	2023	
Thomas Burgess	2023	
Alex Johnston	2022	
Blake Taaffe	2022	
Jaxson Paulo	2022	
Lachlan Ilias	2022	
Lachlan Gale	2022	
Braidon Burns	2021	
Dean Hawkins	2021	
Keaon Koloamatangi	2021	
Steven Marsters	2021	
Mark Nicholls	2021	
Peter Mamouzelos	2021	
Bayley Sironen	2021	
Tevita Tatola	2021	
Ethan Lowe	2021	

=== Coaching staff ===
Name	Position	Team	Reference
Wayne Bennett	Head coach	First Grade (NRL)	
Jason Demetriou	Assistant coach	First Grade (NRL)	
Greg Inglis	Development coach	NRL and All Pathway Teams	
John Sutton	Development coach	NRL and All Pathway Teams	
Ben Rogers	Head coach	Reserve Grade (Canterbury Cup)	
Joe O'Callaghan	Head coach	Under-20's (Jersey Flegg Cup)	
Dean Widders	Head coach	Women's (NSW Women's Premiership)	
Wayne Collins	Head coach	Under-18's (S.G. Ball Cup)	
Gavin Sheehan	Head coach	Under-16's (Harold Matthews Cup)	

== Preseason ==
=== NRL Nines ===
Round	Date	Time	Opponent	Venue	Score	Tries	Bonus Tries	Goals	References
1	14 February 2020	18:40	Wests Tigers	HBF Park, Perth	8–17	Graham, Gebbie		Taaffe (0/1), Ilias (0/1)	
2	15 February 2020	15:55	Canberra Raiders	HBF Park, Perth	29–8	Taaffe, Ilias, Graham, Gagai, Goodwin	J. Cook	Taaffe (1/3), Gagai (1/2), Ilias (0/1)	
Quarter-Finals	15 February 2020	18:55	North Queensland Cowboys	HBF Park, Perth	6–20	Paulo		Ilias (1/1)	
	Legend: Win Loss Draw								

=== Preseason trials ===
Date	Time	Opponent	Venue	Score	Tries	Goals	Notes	References
29 February 2020	19:50	St George Illawarra Dragons	Glen Willow Stadium, Mudgee	26–12	Graham, Mago, Sironen, Koloamatangi, Johnston	Reynolds (0/1), Taaffe (3/4)	37th Charity Shield	
Legend: Win Loss Draw

== Regular season ==
Home games in bold.

Round	Date	Time	Opponent	Venue	Score	Tries	Goals	Field goals	Attendance	Notes	References
1	14 March 2020	17:30	Cronulla-Sutherland Sharks	**ANZ Stadium, Sydney**	22–18	Reynolds, Graham, Lowe	Reynolds (5/5)		6,235	Bushfire Appeal Round	
2	20 March 2020	20:05	Brisbane Broncos	Suncorp Stadium, Brisbane	18–22	Graham, Walker, Johnston	Reynolds (3/4)		0	Round 2 of the NRL season was played behind closed doors due to the COVID-19 pandemic.	
3	29 May 2020	19:55	Sydney Roosters	Bankwest Stadium, Sydney	12–28	Murray, Burgess	Reynolds (2/2)		0	2020 Ron Coote Cup	
4	5 June 2020	19:55	Melbourne Storm	AAMI Park, Melbourne	8–22	Johnston	Reynolds (2/2)		0		
5	13 June 2020	15:00	Gold Coast Titans	**Bankwest Stadium, Sydney**	32–12	Gagai (2), Mitchell, Johnston, Burns	Reynolds (6/6)		?		
6	19 June 2020	18:00	New Zealand Warriors	**Bankwest Stadium, Sydney**	40–12	Johnston (2), Graham, Reynolds, Burns, Walker, Cook	Reynolds (6/7)		?	Beanie for Brain Cancer Round	
7	25 June 2020	19:50	Penrith Panthers	Jubilee Stadium, Sydney	12–20	Sironen, Johnston	Reynolds (2/2)		?		
8	5 July 2020	16:05	Canterbury-Bankstown Bulldogs	Bankwest Stadium, Sydney	26–10	Johnston, Su'A, Walker, Gagai	Reynolds (5/5)		?		
9	10 July 2020	19:55	Wests Tigers	**Bankwest Stadium, Sydney**	18–10	Gagai (3), Roberts	Reynolds (1/5)		?		
10	18 July 2020	17:30	Newcastle Knights	**Bankwest Stadium, Sydney**	18–20	Cook (2), Nicholls	Reynolds (3/3)		?		
11	25 July 2020	19:50	Canberra Raiders	GIO Stadium, Canberra	12–18	Gagai, Reynolds	Reynolds (2/2)		?		
12	30 July 2020	19:50	St George Illawarra Dragons	Jubilee Stadium, Sydney	32–24	Johnston (3), Walker (2), Mitchell	Mitchell (4/7)		2,719	Indigenous Round	
13	7 August 2020	19:50	Brisbane Broncos	**ANZ Stadium, Sydney**	28–10	Gagai, Reynolds, Nicholls, Burgess	Reynolds (6/7)		2,919		
14	15 August 2020	17:30	North Queensland Cowboys	Queensland Country Bank Stadium, Townsville	31–30	Johnston (2), Reynolds, Gagai, Graham	Reynolds (5/6)	Reynolds (1/1)	7,611		
15	22 August 2020	19:35	Manly-Warringah Sea Eagles	**ANZ Stadium, Sydney**	56–16	Johnston (2), Graham (2), Mitchell (2), Marsters, Tatola, Murray	Reynolds (9/9), Mitchell (1/1)		4,712		
16	27 August 2020	19:50	Parramatta Eels	Bankwest Stadium, Sydney	38–0	Graham (2), Allan, Paulo, Walker, Su'A, Reynolds	Reynolds (5/7)	Reynolds (0/1)	7,012		
17	4 September 2020	19:55	Melbourne Storm	**ANZ Stadium, Sydney**	16–22	Graham, Walker	Reynolds (4/4)		?		
18	10 September 2020	19:50	Wests Tigers	Bankwest Stadium, Sydney	26–24	Graham (2), Gagai, Allan	Reynolds (5/5)		3,801		
19	17 September 2020	19:50	Canterbury-Bankstown Bulldogs	**ANZ Stadium, Sydney**	16–26	Paulo, Graham, Johnston	Reynolds (2/3)		4,859	Women in League Round	
20	25 September 2020	19:55	Sydney Roosters	**ANZ Stadium, Sydney**	60–8	Johnston (5), Walker (2), Graham, Allan, Murray	Reynolds (10/12)		7,958	2020 Ron Coote Cup	
Legend: Win Loss Draw Bye

== Finals ==
Round	Date	Time	Opponent	Venue	Score	Tries	Goals	Field goals	Attendance	References
Elimination Final	4 October 2020	16:05	Newcastle Knights	ANZ Stadium, Sydney	46–20	Johnston (2), Tatola (2), Allan, Walker, Murray, Cook	Reynolds (6/8), Gagai (1/1)		17,212	
Semi-Final	10 October 2020	19:50	Parramatta Eels	Bankwest Stadium, Sydney	38–24	Paulo (2), Knight, Murray, Sironen, Cook	Reynolds (7/7)		14,510	
Preliminary Final	17 October 2020	19:50	Penrith Panthers	ANZ Stadium, Sydney	16–20	Johnston, Gagai, Allan	Reynolds (2/4)		30,116	
Legend: Win Loss

== Ladder ==
2020 NRL season
Pos	Team	Pld	W	D	L	B	PF	PA	PD	Pts
1	Penrith Panthers	20	18	1	1	0	537	238	+299	37
2	Melbourne Storm (P)	20	16	0	4	0	534	276	+258	32
3	Parramatta Eels	20	15	0	5	0	392	288	+104	30
4	Sydney Roosters	20	14	0	6	0	552	322	+230	28
5	Canberra Raiders	20	14	0	6	0	445	317	+128	28
6	South Sydney Rabbitohs	20	12	0	8	0	521	352	+169	24
7	Newcastle Knights	20	11	1	8	0	421	374	+47	23
8	Cronulla-Sutherland Sharks	20	10	0	10	0	480	480	0	20
9	Gold Coast Titans	20	9	0	11	0	346	463	−117	18
10	New Zealand Warriors	20	8	0	12	0	343	458	−115	16
11	Wests Tigers	20	7	0	13	0	440	505	−65	14
12	St. George Illawarra Dragons	20	7	0	13	0	378	452	−74	14
13	Manly Warringah Sea Eagles	20	7	0	13	0	375	509	−134	14
14	North Queensland Cowboys	20	5	0	15	0	368	520	−152	10
15	Canterbury-Bankstown Bulldogs	20	3	0	17	0	282	504	−222	6
16	Brisbane Broncos	20	3	0	17	0	268	624	−356	6

== Player statistics ==
2020 NRL South Sydney Rabbitohs Player Statistics
Player	Games	Tries	Try assists	Goals	Goal kicking %	Field goals	Points	Runs	Run metres	Line breaks	Tackle breaks	Offloads	Kicks	Kick metres	Tackles
Corey Allan	10	5	7	0	–	0	20	151	1,348	9	24	4	3	24	33
Tom Amone	4	0	0	0	–	0	0	30	262	0	2	0	0	0	50
Thomas Burgess	23	2	0	0	–	0	8	337	3,111	4	27	8	1	13	524
Braidon Burns	8	2	0	0	–	0	8	84	763	2	17	7	4	102	96
Jed Cartwright	6	0	0	0	–	0	0	41	402	0	7	2	0	0	49
Damien Cook	23	5	10	0	–	0	20	120	1,425	8	52	13	17	190	969
Troy Dargan	2	0	0	0	–	0	0	11	71	0	1	1	9	287	29
Kurt Dillon	1	0	0	0	–	0	0	11	77	0	1	0	0	0	11
Dane Gagai	19	11	0	1	100	0	46	258	2,461	18	65	6	5	41	195
Campbell Graham	21	13	2	0	–	0	52	295	2,633	15	56	5	5	51	353
Jack Johns	2	0	0	0	–	0	0	15	118	0	1	0	0	0	36
Alex Johnston	22	23	2	0	–	0	92	217	2,250	24	55	7	5	86	79
Liam Knight	19	1	0	0	–	0	4	226	1,965	1	14	20	0	0	422
Keaon Koloamatangi	14	0	0	0	–	0	0	145	1,432	0	5	5	0	0	205
Ethan Lowe	10	1	1	0	–	0	4	80	614	0	0	2	0	0	260
Patrick Mago	12	0	0	0	–	0	0	76	763	0	13	2	0	0	114
Steven Marsters	5	1	1	0	–	0	4	41	326	2	8	2	1	11	59
Latrell Mitchell	14	4	15	5	62	0	26	123	1,190	4	50	5	14	295	48
Cameron Murray	23	5	5	0	–	0	20	243	1,996	4	28	29	3	27	843
Mark Nicholls	19	2	2	0	–	0	8	172	1,551	2	16	3	0	0	358
Jaxson Paulo	13	4	3	0	–	0	16	161	1,373	9	24	12	5	49	69
Adam Reynolds	23	6	11	98	85	1	221	65	485	5	30	8	292	8,717	328
James Roberts	6	1	1	0	–	0	4	44	489	4	16	2	1	21	73
Hame Sele	10	0	0	0	–	0	0	83	856	0	3	1	0	0	142
Bayley Sironen	19	2	0	0	–	0	8	164	1,317	1	12	1	0	0	435
Jaydn Su'A	21	2	1	0	–	0	8	225	1,817	0	38	17	1	13	499
Tevita Tatola	21	3	0	0	–	0	12	265	2,234	5	25	4	0	0	481
Cody Walker	21	10	24	0	–	0	40	156	1,409	18	68	14	87	2,001	332

== Red and Green Ball ==
George Piggins Medal	Jack Rayner Players' Player Award	Bob McCarthy Clubman of the Year	John Sattler Rookie of the Year	Albert Clift Award	Roy Asotasi Members' Choice Award	The Burrow Appreciation Award
Cody Walker	Cody Walker	Damien Cook	Keaon Koloamatangi	Brian Stow	Adam Reynolds	Thomas Burgess

== Representative honours ==
Pos.	Player	Team	Call-up	References		
N/A	Damien Cook	New South Wales Blues	Pre-Season NSW Preparations			
N/A	Cameron Murray	New South Wales Blues	Pre-Season NSW Preparations			
N/A	James Roberts	New South Wales Blues	Pre-Season NSW Preparations			
N/A	Cody Walker	New South Wales Blues	Pre-Season NSW Preparations			
N/A	Campbell Graham	Emerging Blues	Pre-Season NSW Preparations			
N/A	Liam Knight	Emerging Blues	Pre-Season NSW Preparations			
IC	Alex Johnston	Indigenous All Stars	2020 All Stars Match		FB	Latrell Mitchell
CE	James Roberts	Indigenous All Stars	2020 All Stars Match			
HK	Damien Cook	Indigenous All Stars	2020 All Stars Match		New South Wales Blues	2020 State of Origin Series
IC	Cameron Murray		2020 All Stars Match		New South Wales Blues	2020 State of Origin Series
FE, IC	Cody Walker				New South Wales Blues	2020 State of Origin Series
CO	Wayne Bennett	Queensland Maroons				2020 State of Origin Series
FB	Corey Allan	Queensland Maroons				2020 State of Origin Series
CE	Dane Gagai	Queensland Maroons				2020 State of Origin Series
SR, IC	Jaydn Su'A	Queensland Maroons				2020 State of Origin Series

- **Bold** denotes players who captained their respective teams.
- **(ToS)** - Train on Squad
