= 2019 South Sydney Rabbitohs season =

- NRL Rank: 3rd
- Play-off result: Preliminary Final
- 2019 record: Wins: 16; draws: 0; losses: 8
- Points scored: For: 521; against: 417

Team information
- CEO: Shane Richardson
- Head Coach: Wayne Bennett
- Captain: Sam Burgess
- Stadium: ANZ Stadium Sunshine Coast Stadium (Round 5 Only); Suncorp Stadium (Round 9 Only) Central Coast Stadium (Round 21 Only)
- Avg. attendance: 16,925
- High attendance: 20,093 v Easts (Rd 26)

Top scorers
- Tries: Cody Walker (16 tries)
- Goals: Adam Reynolds (96 goals)
- Points: Adam Reynolds (207 points)
← 2018	List of seasons	2020 →

The 2019 South Sydney Rabbitohs season was the 110th in the club's history. Coached by Wayne Bennett and captained by Sam Burgess, they compete in the National Rugby League's 2019 Telstra Premiership.

== Squad Movements ==
=== Players ===
==== 2019 Gains ====
Player	Signed from	Until	Reference
Corey Allan	South Logan Magpies (QLD Cup)	2021	
James Roberts	Brisbane Broncos	2021	
Jaydn Su'a	Brisbane Broncos	2021	
Cory Denniss	Newcastle Knights	2020	
Jaxson Paulo	Gold Coast Titans	2020	
Kurt Dillon	Cronulla-Sutherland Sharks	2020	
Liam Knight	Canberra Raiders	2020	
Tom Amone	Blacktown Workers Sea Eagles (NSW Cup)	2020	
Bayley Sironen	Wests Tigers	2019	
Ethan Lowe	North Queensland Cowboys	2019	
Matt McIlwrick	Wests Tigers	2019	
Rhys Kennedy	North Sydney Bears (NSW Cup)	2019	

==== 2019 Losses ====
Player	2019 club	Reference
Richard Kennar	Brisbane Broncos	
Jesse Arthars	Gold Coast Titans	
Hymel Hunt	Newcastle Knights	
Tyrell Fuimaono	Penrith Panthers	
Angus Crichton	Sydney Roosters	
Jason Clark	Warrington Wolves	
Robbie Farah	Wests Tigers	
Robert Jennings	Wests Tigers	
Zane Musgrove	Wests Tigers	

==== Re-Signs ====
Player	Signed Until	Reference
Sam Burgess	2023	
Thomas Burgess	2023	
Damien Cook	2023	
Braidon Burns	2021	
Joshua Cook	2021	
Adam Doueihi	2021	
Campbell Graham	2021	
Dean Hawkins	2021	
Keaon Koloamatangi	2021	
Ethan Lowe	2021	
Cameron Murray	2021	
Tevita Tatola	2021	
Cody Walker	2020	
Jacob Gagan	2019	
Mark Nicholls	2019	
John Sutton	2019	
Connor Tracey	2019	

=== Coaches ===
Coach	2018 club	2019 club	Reference
Wayne Bennett	Brisbane Broncos	South Sydney Rabbitohs	
Anthony Seibold	South Sydney Rabbitohs	Brisbane Broncos	

== Pre-season ==
Date	Opponent	Venue	Score	Tries	Goals	Attendance	References
Sat 16 February	Combined Riverina All Stars	Albury Sports Ground	52–10	Graham (2), Tatola, Allan, Tracey, Denniss, Brittain, Rodwell, Hiroti, Johns	Hiroti (4/7), Rodwell (1/1), Johns (1/1), Graham (0/1)	~6,000	
Sat 23 February	Penrith Panthers	Redfern Oval	8–28	Gagan (2)	Hawkins (0/2)	~4,000	
Sat 2 March	St George Illawarra Dragons	Glen Willow Oval	36–24	Allan (3), Graham, Walker, Murray, Sironen	Gagai (4/6), Lowe (0/1)	9,027	
Legend: Win Loss Draw

== Regular season ==
Home games in bold

Date	Round	Opponent	Venue	Score	Tries	Goals	Field goals	Attendance	References	Notes
Fri 15 March	1	Sydney Roosters	Sydney Cricket Ground	26–16	Murray, S. Burgess, Graham, Walker, Johnston	Reynolds (3/5)		24,527		Ron Coote Cup
Thu 21 March	2	St George Illawarra Dragons	Jubilee Oval	34–18	S. Burgess (2), Murray, Walker, Burns, Graham	Reynolds (5/6)		10,080		
Sun 31 March	3	Gold Coast Titans	**ANZ Stadium**	28–20	Graham (2), Allan, Lowe	Reynolds (6/8)		10,128		
Sat 6 April	4	Manly Warringah Sea Eagles	Lottoland	12–13	S. Burgess, Graham	Reynolds (2/5)	Reynolds (0/2)	12,304		
Sat 13 April	5	New Zealand Warriors	**Sunshine Coast Stadium**	28–24	Walker (4), Lowe	Reynolds (4/5)	Reynolds (0/1)	11,912		
Fri 19 April	6	Canterbury-Bankstown Bulldogs	ANZ Stadium (Reciprocal)	14–6	Graham, Johnston	Reynolds (3/3)		30,040		
Fri 26 April	7	Penrith Panthers	Panthers Stadium	22–18	Turner, Allan, Walker, Gagai	Reynolds (3/5)		14,931		ANZAC Round
Thu 2 May	8	Brisbane Broncos	**ANZ Stadium**	38–6	Walker (2), Reynolds, Turner, S. Burgess, Sutton	Reynolds (7/7)	Reynolds (0/1)	13,643		
Sun 12 May	9	North Queensland Cowboys	**Suncorp Stadium**	32–16	S. Burgess, Murray, Turner, Walker, Cook	Reynolds (6/7)		34,564		Magic Round
Sat 18 May	10	Canberra Raiders	GIO Stadium	16–12	Walker, Hiroti	Reynolds (4/4)		16,965		
Sat 25 May	11	Wests Tigers	**ANZ Stadium**	32–16	Murray (2), Reynolds, Cook, Knight	Reynolds (3/3), Gagai (3/3)		18,195		Indigenous Round
Fri 31 May	12	Parramatta Eels	Western Sydney Stadium	14–26	T. Burgess, Tatola	Reynolds (3/3)		21,645		
Fri 7 June	13	Newcastle Knights	**ANZ Stadium**	12–20	Roberts, S. Burgess	Gagai (2/3)		8,253		
Sat 15 June	14	Penrith Panthers	**ANZ Stadium**	18–19	Murray, Knight, Gagai	Doueihi (1/1), Gagai (2/3)	Walker (0/1)	11,023		
Thu 27 June	15	Wests Tigers	Western Sydney Stadium	9–14	Allan	Reynolds (2/2)	Reynolds (1/1)	9,807		
	16	Bye								
Sat 13 July	17	Manly Warringah Sea Eagles	**ANZ Stadium**	21–20	Britt, Gagai, Graham	Reynolds (4/5)	Reynolds (1/1)	13,434		
Sat 20 July	18	North Queensland Cowboys	1300SMILES Stadium	30–18	Lowe (2), Gagai, Tatola, Murray	Reynolds (5/5)	Reynolds (0/1)	16,638		
Fri 26 July	19	St George Illawarra Dragons	**ANZ Stadium**	20–16	Gagai (2), Walker, Graham	Reynolds (2/5)	Reynolds (0/1)	12,318		
Sat 3 August	20	Cronulla-Sutherland Sharks	Shark Park	24–39	Gagai, Murray, Walker, Graham	Reynolds (4/4)		13,523		
Sun 11 August	21	Melbourne Storm	**Central Coast Stadium**	16–26	Graham (3)	Reynolds (2/3), Lowe (0/1)		19,533		
Sat 17 August	22	Canterbury-Bankstown Bulldogs	**ANZ Stadium**	6–14		Reynolds (3/3)		14,112		Women In League Round
Fri 23 August	23	Brisbane Broncos	Suncorp Stadium	22–20	Gagai, Walker, Cook	Reynolds (5/5)		33,225		
Fri 30 August	24	New Zealand Warriors	Mount Smart Stadium	31–10	Murray (2), Johnston, Gagai	Reynolds (7/7)	Reynolds (1/1)	15,295		
Thu 5 September	25	Sydney Roosters	**ANZ Stadium**	16–10	Graham, Walker	Reynolds (4/4)		20,093		Ron Coote Cup
Legend: Win Loss Draw Bye

=== Finals ===
Date	Round	Opponent	Venue	Score	Tries	Goals	Attendance	References
Fri 13 September	Qualifying Final	Sydney Roosters	Sydney Cricket Ground	6–30	Reynolds	Reynolds (1/1)	30,370	
Fri 20 September	Semi-Final	Manly Warringah Sea Eagles	**ANZ Stadium**	34–26	Murray (2), Johnston, Walker, Sutton	Reynolds (7/9)	32,127	
Fri 27 September	Preliminary Final	Canberra Raiders	GIO Stadium	10–16	Gagai, Graham	Reynolds (1/2)	26,567	
Legend: Win Loss

== Representative Honor's ==
Pos.	Player	Team	Call-up	References
Under-16's
PR	**Izayah Tuigamala**	New South Wales Koori	2019 Koori vs Murri	
FB	Joseph Suaalii	HMC Representatives	Under-16's City vs Country	
WG	Terrell Kalo Kalo	HMC Representatives	Under-16's City vs Country	
PR	Davvy Moale	HMC Representatives	Under-16's City vs Country	
IC	Faresa Palu	HMC Representatives	Under-16's City vs Country	
IC	William Taliai	HMC Representatives	Under-16's City vs Country	
FB	Terrell Kalo Kalo	New South Wales U16's	Junior International	
PR	Davvy Moale	New South Wales U16's	Junior International	
IC	Wiliam Taliai	New South Wales U16's	Junior International	
Under-18's
PR	Lachlan Gale	(Australia) Australian Schoolboys	Junior International	
HK	Peter Mamouzelos	Greece Titans	European Championship C Final 2019 European Championship Play-off	
IC	Peter Mamouzelos	Greece Titans	European Championship C Final 2019 European Championship Play-off	
Under-20's
HB	Blake Taaffe	New South Wales U20's	U20's State of Origin	
PR	Ky Rodwell	New South Wales U20's	U20's State of Origin	
	Marc Zaurrini	Italy Azzurri **(ToS)**	2019 European Championship Play-off	
	Jack Frasca	Italy Azzurri **(ToS)**	2019 European Championship Play-off	
	Zane Bijorac	Serbia White Eagles	2019 European Championship Play-off	
IC	Nick Mougios	Greece Titans	2019 European Championship Play-off	
Women's
IC	Kyara Nean	(Australia) Indigenous Women's All Stars	2019 Women's All Stars Match	
HK	Rebecca Riley	NSW Women's City Origin	2019 Women's National Championship	
LK	Eloise Vunakece	Fiji Bulikula	Women's International	
SR	Eloise Vunakece	Fiji Women's PM's XIII	2019 Women's PM's XIII Match	
SR	Jasmine Allende	(Australia) Australian Women's PM's XIII	2019 Women's PM's XIII Match	
Reserve Grade
CO	Shane Millard	New South Wales Residents	2019 Residents State of Origin	
FE	Connor Tracey	New South Wales Residents	2019 Residents State of Origin	
HK	**Billy Britain**	New South Wales Residents	2019 Residents State of Origin	
SR	Dean Britt	New South Wales Residents	2019 Residents State of Origin	
IC	Keaon Koloamatangi	New South Wales Residents	2019 Residents State of Origin	
IC	Tom Amone	New South Wales Residents	2019 Residents State of Origin	
	Jack Johns	Italy Azzurri **(ToS)**	2019 European Championship Play-off	
First Grade
CO	Wayne Bennett	England	2019 Nines World Cup	
CO	Wayne Bennett	(United Kingdom) Great Britain Lions	2019 Great Britain Lions Tour	
FB	Alex Johnston	(Australia) Indigenous All Stars	2019 All Stars Match	
FE	**Cody Walker**	(Australia) Indigenous All Stars	2019 All Stars Match	
WG	Dane Gagai	(Māori people) Māori All Stars	2019 All Stars Match	
FE	Cody Walker	New South Wales Blues	2019 State of Origin	
HK	Damien Cook	New South Wales Blues	2019 State of Origin	
IC	Cameron Murray	New South Wales Blues	2019 State of Origin	
WG	Dane Gagai	Queensland Maroons	2019 State of Origin	
SR	Ethan Lowe	Queensland Maroons	2019 State of Origin	
IC	Tevita Tatola	Tonga	2019 Oceania Cup	
WG	Campbell Graham	(Australia) Junior Kangaroos	Junior International	
WG	Campbell Graham	(Australia) Prime Minister's XIII	2019 Prime Minister's XIII Match	
IC	Campbell Graham	Australia 9s	2019 World Cup 9s	
FE	Cody Walker	(Australia) Prime Minister's XIII	2019 Prime Minister's XIII Match	
HK	Damien Cook	Australia Kangaroos	2019 Oceania Cup	
IC	Cameron Murray	Australia Kangaroos	2019 Oceania Cup	
PR	Thomas Burgess	England 9s	2019 World Cup 9s	
PR, IC	Thomas Burgess	(United Kingdom) Great Britain Lions	2019 Great Britain Lions tour	
FB	Alex Johnston	Papua New Guinea	2019 Oceania Cup 2019 Great Britain Lions tour	

- **Bold** denotes players who captained their respective teams.
- **(SoT)** - Train on Squad

== Harold Matthews Cup ==
=== Regular season ===
Date	Round	Opponent	Venue	Score	Tries	Goals	References
Sat 9 February	1	Western Suburbs Magpies	Redfern Oval	36–16	Palu (2), Suaalii (c), Vesikula, Smirnotis, Ace-Nasteski, Mocevakaca	Nohra (4/7)	
Sat 16 February	2	Canterbury-Bankstown Bulldogs	Belmore Sports Ground	26–18	Mocevakaca, Palu, Suaalii (c). Ka, Ace-Nasteski	Nohra (3/5)	
Sat 23 February	3	Penrith Panthers	Redfern Oval	30–18	Moale (2), Vesikula, Ofria-Hunt, Ace-Nasteski, Nohra	Nohra (3/6)	
Sat 2 March	4	Central Coast Roosters	Morry Breen Oval	40–8	Suaalii (c) (4), Kaho, Hawe-De-Thierry, Ace-Nasteski	Nohra (6/7)	
Sat 9 March	5	Parramatta Eels	Redfern Oval	32–14	Mocevakaca (3), Palu, Suaalii (c), Teaupa	Nohra (4/6)	
Sat 16 March	6	Sydney Roosters	Erskineville Oval	26–6	Reeve (2), Smirnotis, Palu, Vesikula	Teaupa (3/5)	
	7	Bye					
Sat 30 March	8	Newcastle Knights	Redfern Oval	30–16	Suaalii (c), Mocevakaca, Tuigamala, Hawe-De-Thierry, Di Bartolo, Taliai	Nohra (3/6)	
Sat 6 April	9	Manly Warringah Sea Eagles	HE Laybutts Complex	24–28	Suaalii (c) (2), Kaho, Lavaki, Vesikula	Nohra (0/3), Teaupa (2/2)	
Legend: Win Loss Draw Bye

=== Finals ===
Date	Round	Opponent	Venue	Score	Tries	Goals	References
Sat 13 April	Qualifying-Final	Manly Warringah Sea Eagles	Lottoland	40–18	Suaalii (c) (4), Kaho (2), Smirnotis	Nohra (6/7)	
Sat 27 April	Preliminary Final	Canterbury-Bankstown Bulldogs	Campbelltown Stadium	30–36	Vesikula (2), Suaalii (c), Ace-Nasteski, Taliai	Nohra (5/5)	
Legend: Win Loss

== S.G. Ball Cup ==
=== Regular season ===
Date	Round	Opponent	Venue	Score	Tries	Goals	References
Sat 9 February	1	Western Suburbs Magpies	Redfern Oval	32–10	Aldridge (2), Savage, Dodds, Mapapalangi, Meredith	Savage (4/6)	
Sat 16 February	2	Canterbury-Bankstown Bulldogs	Belmore Sports Ground	4–30	Zampech	Savage (0/1)	
Sat 23 February	3	Penrith Panthers	Redfern Oval	16–20	Mamouzelos (c) (2), Dodds	Zampech (2/3)	
Sat 2 March	4	Central Coast Roosters	Morry Breen Oval	14–24	Gleeson, Bijoric, Parnell	Zampech (1/3)	
Sat 9 March	5	Parramatta Eels	Redfern Oval	28–32	Aldridge, Meredith, Zampech, Taumoepenu, Mamouzelos (c)	Zampech (4/5)	
Sat 16 March	6	Sydney Roosters	Erskineville Oval	20–30	Meredith (2), Mamouzelos (c), Aldridge	Zampech (2/4)	
Sat 23 March	7	Victoria Thunderbolts	Casey Fields	34–30	Mamouzelos (c) (3), Parnell, Meredith, Manumanunitoga	Zampech (5/6)	
Sat 30 March	8	Newcastle Knights	Redfern Oval	34–16	Zampech (3), Bijorac, Meredith, Mamouzelos (c)	Zampech (5/6)	
Sat 6 April	9	Manly Warringah Sea Eagles	HE Laybutts Complex	10–66	Aldridge, Malu	Zampech (1/2)	
Legend: Win Loss Draw Bye

== Jersey Flegg Cup ==
=== Regular season ===
Date	Round	Opponent	Venue	Score	Tries	Goals	Field goals	References
	1	Bye						
Sat 23 March	2	St George Illawarra Dragons	Redfern Oval	28–28	Zaurrini (2), Chan-Foon, Er, Manowski	Taaffe (3/4), Tautaiolefua (1/1)	Zaurrini (0/1)	
Sun 31 March	3	North Sydney Bears	Redfern Oval	30–30	Cook (2), Chan-Foon, Mougios (c), Allan	Taaffe (5/5)	Cook (0/1)	
Sat 6 April	4	Manly Warringah Sea Eagles	HE Laybutt Field	50–10	Rodwell (2), Cook (2), Angianga (2), Mougios (c) (2), Allan	Taaffe (7/9)		
Sat 13 April	5	New Zealand Warriors	QBE Stadium	34–28	Tautaiolefua (2), Allan (2), Cook, Er, Mougios (c)	Taaffe (2/6)		
Fri 19 April	6	Canterbury-Bankstown Bulldogs	ANZ Stadium	22–6	Er, Gardner Mamouzelos, Allan	Taaffe (3/5)		
Sat 27 April	7	Penrith Panthers	St Marys Leagues Stadium	0–42				
Thu 2 May	8	North Sydney Bears	ANZ Stadium	26–12	Rodwell, Frasca, Tautaiolefua, Gale, Allan	Taaffe (3/5)		
Sat 11 May	9	Wests Tigers	Leichhardt Oval	58–18	Allan (3), Mamouzelos (2), Taaffe, Cook, Stowers, Rodwell, Frasca	Taaffe (7/8), Ilias (2/2)		
	10	Bye						
	11	Bye						
Sun 2 June	12	Parramatta Eels	Ringrose Park	18–31	Mamouzelos, Chan-Foon, Tautaiolefua	Ilias (3/3)		
Sat 8 June	13	Newcastle Knights	Redfern Oval	16–28	Ilias, Mougios (c), Zampech	Ilias (2/3)		
Sat 15 June	14	Penrith Panthers	Redfern Oval	23–22	Tautaiolefua, Ilias, Frasca, Stowers	Ilias (3/4)	Ilias (1/1)	
Sun 23 June	15	Canberra Raiders	Crestwood Oval	28–12	Angianga, Gale, Frasca, Paulo	Ilias (2/3), Taaffe (2/2)		
Sun 30 June	16	Wests Tigers	Campbelltown Stadium	24–38	Ilias (2), French, Cook	Taaffe (4/4)		
	17	Bye						
Sat 20 July	18	Parramatta Eels	Redfern Oval	36–32	Rodwell (2), Cook, Taaffe, Mamouzelos, Tautaiolefua	Taaffe (6/6)		
Sun 28 July	19	St George Illawarra Dragons	WIN Stadium	28–18	Rodwell (2), Puru, Allan, Ilias	Ilias (4/5)		
Sat 3 August	20	Cronulla-Sutherland Sharks	Shark Park	20–20	Paulo, Angianga, Hawkins, Mougios (c)	Ilias (2/4)		
Sun 11 August	21	Victoria Thunderbolts	Central Coast Stadium	64–6	Angianga (3), French (2), Hawkins (2), Tautaiolefua, Mougios (c), Dut, Mundine	Ilias (10/11)		
Sat 17 August	22	Canterbury-Bankstown Bulldogs	ANZ Stadium	12–18	Paulo (3)	Ilias (0/3)		
Sat 24 August	23	Newcastle Knights	Maitland Sports Ground	32–36	Tautaiolefua (2), Dut, Zaurrini, Taaffe, Taumoepenu	Taaffe (4/6)		
Fri 30 August	24	Sydney Roosters	Redfern Oval	23–12	Ilias (2), Allan, Cook	Taaffe (3/4)	Ilias (1/1)	
Legend: Win Loss Draw Bye

=== Finals ===
Date	Round	Opponent	Venue	Score	Tries	Goals	References
Sun 8 September	Elimination Final	St George Illawarra Dragons	Campbelltown Stadium	32–24	Allan (2), Ilias (2), Cook, Zaurrini	Ilias (4/6)	
Sun 15 September	Semi-Final	Cronulla-Sutherland Sharks	Leichhardt Oval	36–31	Zampech (2), Taaffe, Dut, Tautaiolefua, Zaurrini	Taaffe (6/7)	
Sat 21 September	Preliminary Final	Penrith Panthers	Netstrata Jubilee Stadium	28–16	Allan (2), Cook, Mamouzelos, Mougios (c)	Taaffe (4/5)	
Sun 29 September	Grand Final	Canberra Raiders	Bankwest Stadium	16–14	Taaffe (2), Mougios (c)	Taaffe (2/3)	
Legend: Win Loss

== NSW Women's Premiership ==
=== Regular season ===
Date	Round	Opponent	Venue	Score	Tries	Goals	References
	1	Bye					
	2	Bye					
Sun 31 March	3	Canterbury-Bankstown Bulldogs	ANZ Stadium	18–4	Clay, Lamb, Mo'ale, Gillogly	Clay (1/4)	
Sat 6 April	4	Cabramatta Two Blues	Mascot Oval	12–16	Mo'ale (2)	Clay (2/2)	
	5	Bye					
	6	Bye					
Sun 28 April	7	North Sydney Bears	Erskineville Oval	6–16	Clay	Clay (1/1)	
Sun 5 May	8	Penrith Brothers	Mascot Oval	42–4	Sutherland (2), Vunakece (2), Boney, Pilley, Nean, Murray	Kelly (5/8)	
Sun 12 May	9	Wentworthville Magpies	Ringrose Park	16–14	Riley (c), Doyle, Mo'ale	Clay (1/1), Kelly (1/2)	
Sun 19 May	10	Cronulla-Sutherland Sharks	PointsBet Stadium	20–40	Kennedy (2), Pilley, Sutherland	Kelly (2/4)	
	11	Bye					
	12	Bye					
Sat 8 June	13	CRL Newcastle	Redfern Oval	6–24	Mo'ale	Clay (1/1)	
	14	Bye					
Sun 30 June	15	Wests Tigers	Campbelltown Stadium	10–18	Baird, Doyle	Kelly (1/2)	
Sat 6 July	16	Mount Prichard Mounties	Redfern Oval	8–30	Young (2)	Kelly (0/2)	
Sat 13 July	17	St Marys Saints	St Marys League Stadium	8–34	Baird, Doyle	Kelly (0/2)	
Legend: Win Loss Draw Bye

== Canterbury Cup ==
=== Regular season ===
Date	Round	Opponent	Venue	Score	Tries	Goals	Field goals	References	Notes
Sun 17 March	1	North Sydney Bears	Redfern Oval	18–14	Turner, Brittain (c), Tracey	Hiroti (3/3)			
Sat 23 March	2	St George Illawarra Dragons	Redfern Oval	24–20	O'Connor, Kennedy, Gagan, Allan	Hiroti (4/5)			
Sun 31 March	3	Newtown Jets	Redfern Oval	28–26	Koloamatangi, Johns, Brittain (c), Gagan, Hiroti	Hiroti (4/5)			
Sat 6 April	4	Blacktown Workers Sea Eagles	Lottoland	12–32	Tracey, O'Connor	Hiroti (2/2)			
Sat 13 April	5	New Zealand Warriors	North Harbour Stadium	18–14	Hiroti, Peoples, Johns	Hiroti (3/3)			
Sat 20 April	6	Canterbury-Bankstown Bulldogs	Belmore Sports Ground	36–6	Tracey, Higgins, Koloamatangi, Hills, Hiroti, Gagan	Hiroti (6/7)			
Sat 27 April	7	Penrith Panthers	Panthers Stadium	18–20	Brittain (c), Britt, Hiroti	Hiroti (3/3)			
Sat 4 May	8	Newtown Jets	Henson Park	24–26	Hiroti (2), Higgins, Hawkins	Hiroti (4/5)			
	9	Bye							
Sat 18 May	10	Mount Prichard Mounties	Panthers Stadium	18–32	Amone, Higgins, Johns	Hawkins (3/3)			Magic Round
Sun 26 May	11	Western Suburbs Magpies	Redfern Oval	18–30	Johns, Sironen, Higgins	Hawkins (3/3)			Kelly-Sattler Cup
Sun 2 June	12	Wentworthville Magpies	Ringrose Park	20–14	Allan, Cook, Gagan	Hawkins (2/2), Dodd (2/2)			
Sat 8 June	13	Newcastle Knights	Redfern Oval	26–6	Paulo (2), Brittain (c), Gagan	Dodd (5/5)			
Sat 15 June	14	Penrith Panthers	ANZ Stadium	36–16	Hiroti (2), O'Connor (2), Gagan, Allan, Gray	Hiroti (4/8)			
Sun 30 June	15	Western Suburbs Magpies	Campbelltown Stadium	34–16	Johns, Higgins, Sironen, O'Connor, Rodwell, Tracey	Hiroti (5/6)			Kelly-Sattler Cup
Sat 6 July	16	Mount Prichard Mounties	Redfern Oval	30–18	Hiroti, Paulo, Su'A, Sironen	Hiroti (5/6)			
Sat 13 July	17	Blacktown Workers Sea Eagles	ANZ Stadium	22–30	Higgins (2), Allan, Taaffe, Hiroti	Hiroti (1/5)			
	18	Bye							
Sun 28 July	19	St George Illawarra Dragons	WIN Stadium	25–22	Hiroti, Higgins, Sironen, Tracey	Hiroti (4/5)	Taaffe (1/1)		
Sun 4 August	20	North Sydney Bears	North Sydney Oval	31–24	Higgins (2), Tracey, Su'A, Hills	Hiroti (5/6)	Taaffe (1/1)		
Sun 11 August	21	New Zealand Warriors	Central Coast Stadium	32–30	Amone (2), Tracey, Higgins, Dodd, Nakubuwai	Hiroti (4/7)			
Sat 17 August	22	Canterbury-Bankstown Bulldogs	ANZ Stadium	24–36	Higgins, O'Connor, Brittain (c), Tracey	Hawkins (4/5)			
Sat 24 August	23	Newcastle Knights	Maitland Sports Ground	32–4	Hiroti (2), Tracey, Hawkins, Lowe	Hiroti (6/6)			
Sat 31 August	24	Wentworthville Magpies	Redfern Oval	16–26	O'Connor (2), Hiroti	Hiroti (2/3)			
Legend: Win Loss Draw Bye

=== Finals ===
Date	Round	Opponent	Venue	Score	Tries	Goals	References
Sun 8 September	Qualifying-Final	North Sydney Bears	Campbelltown Stadium	32–12	Paulo (3), Hiroti (2), Tracey	Hiroti (4/8)	
Sat 21 September	Preliminary Final	Wentworthville Magpies	Netstrata Jubilee Stadium	10–35	Turner, Hiroti	Hiroti (1/2)	
Legend: Win Loss
