= 2019 Parramatta Eels season =

Australia Rugby League Parramatta Eels 2019 season

- NRL Rank: 5th
- Play-off result: Semi-finalists (Lost 0–32 vs Melbourne Storm, 1st Semi Final)
- World Club Challenge: DNQ
- 2019 record: Wins: 14; draws: 0; losses: 10
- Points scored: For: 533; against: 473

Team information
- CEO: Bernie Gurr
- Coach: (Australia) Brad Arthur
- Captain: (Australia) Clinton Gutherson
- Stadium: Bankwest Stadium (Capacity: 30,000); ANZ Stadium (Capacity: 83,500); TIO Stadium (Capacity: 12,500)
- Avg. attendance: 18,396 (Home); 18,686 (Home & Away); 25,194 (Finals Series)
- Agg. attendance: 220,757 (Home); 448,464 (Home & Away); 50,387 (Finals Series)
- High attendance: 29,372 (15 September vs Brisbane Broncos, 1st Elimination Final)

Top scorers
- Tries: (Fiji) Maika Sivo (22)
- Goals: (Lebanon) Mitchell Moses (92)
- Points: (Lebanon) Mitchell Moses (201)
← 2018	List of seasons	2020 →

The 2019 Parramatta Eels season was the 73rd in the club's history. Coached by Brad Arthur and captained by Clinton Gutherson, they competed in the NRL's 2019 Telstra Premiership.

== Summary ==
Before the start of the 2019 NRL season, Parramatta were predicted by many to finish towards the bottom of the table or claim another wooden spoon. The club started off the year with back to back victories over Penrith and arch rivals Canterbury-Bankstown. In round 6 of the 2019 NRL season, Parramatta played their first game at the new Western Sydney Stadium against the Wests Tigers and ran out 51–6 winners in front of a sold-out crowd.

In round 9 against Melbourne, Parramatta suffered one of their worst ever defeats losing 64–10 at Suncorp Stadium. In the aftermath of the defeat, coach Brad Arthur and the players were placed under intense scrutiny but just a week after the loss, Arthur was given a two-year contract extension by the Parramatta board. The club would then go on to lose against North Queensland and last placed Penrith in the coming weeks.

Between round 12 and round 22 of the 2019 season, Parramatta would go on to win eight of their ten games. In round 22 against the Gold Coast Titans, Parramatta qualified for the 2019 finals series with a 36–12 victory at Cbus Super Stadium.

At the end of the 2019 regular season, Parramatta finished fifth on the table. In the elimination final against Brisbane, Parramatta won the match 58–0 at the new Western Sydney Stadium. The victory was the biggest finals win in history, eclipsing Newtown's 55–7 win over St. George in 1944. The match was also Parramatta's biggest win over Brisbane and Brisbane's worst ever loss since entering the competition in 1988. The following week against Melbourne in the elimination semi final, Parramatta were defeated 32–0 at AAMI Park which ended their season. The loss against Melbourne was also the sixth time Parramatta had been defeated by Melbourne in a finals game since 1999.

== Standings ==
2019 NRL season
Pos	Team	Pld	W	D	L	B	PF	PA	PD	Pts
1	Melbourne Storm	24	20	0	4	1	631	300	+331	42
2	Sydney Roosters	24	17	0	7	1	627	363	+264	36
3	South Sydney Rabbitohs	24	16	0	8	1	521	417	+104	34
4	Canberra Raiders	24	15	0	9	1	524	374	+150	32
5	Parramatta Eels	24	14	0	10	1	533	473	+60	30
6	Manly-Warringah Sea Eagles	24	14	0	10	1	496	446	+50	30
7	Cronulla-Sutherland Sharks	24	12	0	12	1	514	464	+50	26
8	Brisbane Broncos	24	11	1	12	1	432	489	−57	25
9	Wests Tigers	24	11	0	13	1	475	486	−11	24
10	Penrith Panthers	24	11	0	13	1	413	474	−61	24
11	Newcastle Knights	24	10	0	14	1	485	522	−37	22
12	Canterbury-Bankstown Bulldogs	24	10	0	14	1	326	477	−151	22
13	New Zealand Warriors	24	9	1	14	1	433	574	−141	21
14	North Queensland Cowboys	24	9	0	15	1	378	500	−122	20
15	St. George Illawarra Dragons	24	8	0	16	1	427	575	−148	18
16	Gold Coast Titans	24	4	0	20	1	370	651	−281	10

== Fixtures ==
=== Pre-season ===
Round	Home	Score	Away	Match Information
Round	Home	Score	Away	Date and time (Local)	Venue	Attendance
1	Parramatta Eels	20 – 22	Canberra Raiders	Friday, 15 February, 7:00 pm	St Marys Leagues Stadium
2	Penrith Panthers	0 – 20	Parramatta Eels	Saturday, 2 March, 7:00 pm	Panthers Stadium	6,339

=== Home and away season ===
Round	Home	Score	Away	Match Information
Round	Home	Score	Away	Date and time (Local)	Venue	Attendance
1	Penrith Panthers	12 – 20	Parramatta Eels	Sunday 17 March, 4:05 pm	Panthers Stadium	12,604
2	Canterbury-Bankstown Bulldogs	16 – 36	Parramatta Eels	Sunday, 24 March, 4:05 pm	ANZ Stadium	20,134
3	Parramatta Eels	18 – 32	Sydney Roosters	Friday, 29 March, 7:55 pm	ANZ Stadium	13,367
4	Parramatta Eels	24 – 12	Cronulla-Sutherland Sharks	Saturday, 6 April, 7:35 pm	ANZ Stadium	11,185
5	Canberra Raiders	19 – 0	Parramatta Eels	Sunday, 14 April, 6:10 pm	GIO Stadium	16,059
6	Parramatta Eels	51 – 6	Wests Tigers	Monday, 22 April, 4:00 pm	Bankwest Stadium	29,047
7	Newcastle Knights	28 – 14	Parramatta Eels	Sunday, 28 April, 4:05 pm	McDonald Jones Stadium	19,604
8	Parramatta Eels	32 – 18	St George Illawarra Dragons	Sunday, 5 May, 4:05 pm	Bankwest Stadium	25,872
9	Melbourne Storm	64 – 10	Parramatta Eels	Saturday, 11 May, 7:35 pm	Suncorp Stadium	41,612
10	North Queensland Cowboys	17 – 10	Parramatta Eels	Saturday, 18 May, 5:30 pm	1300SMILES Stadium	12,493
11	Parramatta Eels	10 – 16	Penrith Panthers	Thursday, 23 May, 7:50 pm	Bankwest Stadium	16,228
12	Parramatta Eels	26 – 14	South Sydney Rabbitohs	Friday, 31 May, 7:55 pm	Bankwest Stadium	21,645
13	Cronulla-Sutherland Sharks	42 – 22	Parramatta Eels	Saturday, 8 June, 5:30 pm	Shark Park	12,386
14	Parramatta Eels	38 – 10	Brisbane Broncos	Saturday, 15 June, 7:35 pm	Bankwest Stadium	16,854
15	Parramatta Eels	22 – 16	Canberra Raiders	Saturday, 29 June, 7:35 pm	TIO Stadium	5,391
16	Bye Round
17	Wests Tigers	18 – 30	Parramatta Eels	Sunday, 14 July, 4:05 pm	Bankwest Stadium	24,125
18	Manly-Warringah Sea Eagles	36 – 24	Parramatta Eels	Sunday, 21 July, 4:05 pm	Lottoland	15,245
19	Parramatta Eels	24 – 22	New Zealand Warriors	Saturday, 27 July, 3:00 pm	Bankwest Stadium	17,392
20	St George Illawarra Dragons	4 – 12	Parramatta Eels	Sunday, 4 August, 4:05 pm	Netstrata Jubilee Stadium	9,645
21	Parramatta Eels	20 – 14	Newcastle Knights	Saturday, 10 August, 6:30 pm	Bankwest Stadium	20,671
22	Gold Coast Titans	12 – 36	Parramatta Eels	Friday, 16 August, 6:00 pm	Cbus Super Stadium	10,780
23	Parramatta Eels	6 – 12	Canterbury-Bankstown Bulldogs	Thursday, 22 August, 7:50 pm	Bankwest Stadium	18,071
24	Brisbane Broncos	17 – 16	Parramatta Eels	Friday, 30 August, 7:55 pm	Suncorp Stadium	33,020
25	Parramatta Eels	32 – 16	Manly-Warringah Sea Eagles	Friday, 6 September, 6:00 pm	Bankwest Stadium	25,034

=== Finals series ===
Final	Home	Score	Away	Match Information
Final	Home	Score	Away	Date and time (Local)	Venue	Attendance
EF	Parramatta Eels	58 – 0	Brisbane Broncos	Sunday, 15 September, 4:00 pm	Bankwest Stadium	29,372
SF	Melbourne Storm	32 – 0	Parramatta Eels	Saturday, 21 September, 5:30 pm	AAMI Park	21,015

== Players and staff ==
The playing squad and coaching staff of the Parramatta Eels for the 2019 NRL season as of 28 July 2019.

Parramatta Eels
Top 30 squad			Extended squad	Coaching staff
Daniel Alvaro – PR; Waqa Blake – CE, WG; Dylan Brown – HB, FE; Nathan Brown – LK, SR, PR; Andrew Davey – SR; Kane Evans – PR; Blake Ferguson – WG, CE, FB; David Gower – SR, LK, PR; Clinton Gutherson (c) – FB, FE, CE, WG; Josh Hoffman – FB, CE, WG	George Jennings – WG; Michael Jennings – CE; Oregon Kaufusi – PR, LK; Shaun Lane – SR; Greg Leleisiuao – WG, CE; Reed Mahoney – HK; Tim Mannah (c) – PR; Manu Ma’u – SR, LK; Matt McIlwrick – HK, LK; Tepai Moeroa – SR, LK, PR	Mitchell Moses – FE, HB; Marata Niukore – SR; Junior Paulo – PR; Jaeman Salmon – FE; Maika Sivo – WG; Will Smith – FB, HK, FE; Ray Stone – LK; Brad Takairangi – SR, CE, FE; Peni Terepo – PR, LK	Rhys Davies (DP) – HB, FE; Haze Dunster (DP) – WG, CE; Salesi Fainga'a (DP) – SR; Ethan Parry (DP) – CE, WG; Stefano Utoikamanu (DP) – PR, SR	Head coach: Brad Arthur; Assistant coaches: Steve Murphy; David Kidwell; Michael Potter (Development coach); Robert Taylor (ISP NSW coach); Dean Feeney (Jersey Flegg coach); Legend: (c) Captain(s); (vc) Vice-captain(s); Updated: 28 July 2019; Source(s): Eels Team Profiles

== Transfers ==
In:

Nat.	Pos.	Name	From	Transfer window	Date	Ref.
(New Zealand)		Dylan Brown	Youth	Pre-season
(Australia)		Andrew Davey	Townsville Blackhawks	Pre-season	October 2018
(Fiji)		Salesi Fainga'a	Youth	Pre-season
(Australia)		Blake Ferguson	Sydney Roosters	Pre-season
(Australia)		Shaun Lane	Manly Warringah Sea Eagles	Pre-season	October 2018
(Australia)		Ethan Parry	Youth	Pre-season
(Samoa)		Junior Paulo	Canberra Raiders	Pre-season
(Fiji)		Maika Sivo	Penrith Panthers	Pre-season	October 2018
(New Zealand)		Stefano Utoikamanu	Youth	Pre-season
(New Zealand)		Matthew McIlwrick	South Sydney Rabbitohs	Mid-season	March 2019
(Fiji)		Waqa Blake	Penrith Panthers	Mid-season	June 2019

Out:

Nat.	Pos.	Name	To	Transfer window	Date	Ref.
(Samoa)		Kirisome Auva'a	Retired	Pre-season
(Australia)		Cameron King	Featherstone Rovers	Pre-season
(Samoa)		Suaia Matagi	Huddersfield Giants	Pre-season
(Australia)		Corey Norman	St George Illawarra Dragons	Pre-season	December 2018
(Australia)		Beau Scott	Retired	Pre-season
(Tonga)		Tony Williams	Blacktown Workers Sea Eagles	Pre-season
(Australia)		Nathan Davis	Released	Pre-season
(Fiji)		Jarryd Hayne	Released	Pre-season
(Tonga)		Siosaia Vave	St Marys Saints	Pre-season
(Samoa)		Kaysa Pritchard	Retired	Mid-season	June 2019
(Australia)		Bevan French	Wigan Warriors	Mid-season	July 2019
