= Sironen =

Sironen is a Finnish surname. Notable people with the surname include:

- Paul Sironen (born 1965), Australian professional rugby league player
- Curtis Sironen (born 1993), Australian professional rugby league player
- Bayley Sironen (born 1996), Australian professional rugby league player
