= 2019 Penrith Panthers season =

- NRL Rank: 10th
- 2019 record: Wins: 11; draws: 0; losses: 13
- Points scored: For: 413; against: 474

Team information
- CEO: Brian Fletcher
- Coach: Ivan Cleary
- Captain: James Tamou
- Stadium: Panthers Stadium – 22,500; Carrington Park – 13,000 (round 3 only)
- Avg. attendance: 12,437
- High attendance: 16,833

Top scorers
- Tries: Nathan Cleary (10)
- Goals: Nathan Cleary (58)
- Points: Nathan Cleary (157)
← 2018	List of seasons	2020 →

The 2019 Penrith Panthers season was the 53rd season in the club's history. Coached by Ivan Cleary and captained by James Tamou, the Panthers are competing in the National Rugby League's 2019 Telstra Premiership.

== Squad ==
Penrith Panthers 2019 Squad
First Grade (Top 30) Squad			Development Players	Coaching Staff
Caleb Aekins – FB; Reagan Campbell-Gillard – PR; Jed Cartwright – CE, SR; Nathan Cleary – HB; Dylan Edwards – FB, WG; Wayde Egan – HK; Kaide Ellis – LK, SR; James Fisher-Harris – SR, LK, PR; Tyrell Fuimaono – SR, CE; Jack Hetherington – PR, SR	Sione Katoa – HK, LK; Mitch Kenny – HK, LK; Viliame Kikau – PR, SR; Spencer Leniu – PR; Moses Leota – PR; Jarome Luai (gk) – FE, HB, HK; Nick Lui-Toso – PR; James Maloney – HB, FE; Josh Mansour – WG; Liam Martin – LK	Tyrone May – FE; Brent Naden – CE; Paea Pua – PR; Hame Sele – LK; James Tamou – PR (c); Brian To'o – WG; Malakai Watene-Zelezniak – WG, CE; Dean Whare – CE, WG, FB; Frank Winterstein – SR; Isaah Yeo – SR, CE (vc)	Dean Blore – FE, HB; Shawn Blore – SR; Billy Burns – SR; Matt Burton – HB, FE; Stephen Crichton – CE, WG; Brayden McGrady – CE; Extended squad: Sam McKendry – PR	Head coach: Ivan Cleary; Assistant coaches: Cameron Ciraldo; Peter Wallace; Guy Missio (ISP coach); Ben Harden (JF coach); Hayden Knowles (Head of Performance); Legend: (c) Captain(s); (vc) Vice-captain(s); Updated: 05 October 2019; Source(s):

=== Player transfers ===
A † denotes that the transfer occurred during the 2019 season.

Gains
Player	Signed from	Until end of	Notes
Tyrell Fuimaono	South Sydney Rabbitohs	2019	
Tim Grant	Wests Tigers	2019	
Hame Sele	St George Illawarra	2019	
Malakai Watene-Zelezniak	Wests Tigers	2020	
Frank Winterstein	Manly-Warringah Sea Eagles	2019	

Losses
Player	Signed To	Until end of	Notes
Christian Crichton	Canterbury-Bankstown Bulldogs	2021	
Corey Harawira-Naera	Canterbury-Bankstown Bulldogs	2022	
Adam Keighran	New Zealand Warriors	2021	
Soni Luke	Wests Tigers		
Trent Merrin	Leeds Rhinos	2022	
Tyrone Peachey	Gold Coast Titans	2021	
Maika Sivo	Parramatta Eels	2021	
Corey Waddell	Manly Warringah Sea Eagles	2019	
Jayden Walker	Retired		
Tyrone Phillips	Resigned		
Tim Grant	Contract Terminated		
Dallin Watene Zelezniak	Canterbury Bankstown Bulldogs		
Waqa Blake	Parramatta Eels		

== Fixtures ==
=== Pre-season ===
Date	Trial	Opponent	Venue	Score	Tries	Goals
Saturday, 23 February	1	South Sydney Rabbitohs	Redfern Oval	8 - 28	Katoa, Campbell-Gillard, May, Paea Pua, Brent Naden	Maloney (2/2), Cartwright (2/2)
Saturday, 2 March	2	Parramatta Eels	Panthers Stadium	0 - 20		
Legend: Win Loss Draw

=== Regular season ===
Date	Round	Opponent	Venue	Score	Tries	Goals	Attendance
Sunday, 17 March	1	Parramatta Eels	Panthers Stadium	12 - 20	Egan, Tamou	Cleary (2/2)	12,604
Saturday, 23 March	2	Newcastle Knights	McDonald Jones Stadium	14 - 16	Fisher-Harris, Winterstein, Yeo	Cleary (2/3)	19,451
Saturday, 30 March	3	Melbourne Storm	Carrington Park	2 - 32		Maloney (1/1)	10,973
Friday, 5 April	4	Wests Tigers	Panthers Stadium	9 - 8	Edwards	Cleary (2/2, 1 FG)	14,002
Friday, 12 April	5	Gold Coast Titans	Cbus Super Stadium	30 - 24	Maloney, Kikau, Fisher-Harris, Mansour	Cleary (4/4)	8,680
Thursday, 18 April	6	Cronulla Sharks	PointsBet Stadium	24 - 20	Grant, Cleary, Blake	Cleary (4/4)	10,088
Friday, 26 April	7	South Sydney Rabbitohs	Panthers Stadium	18 - 22	Maloney, D.Watene-Zelezniak, Kikau	Cleary (4/4)	14,931
Saturday, 4 May	8	Canberra Raiders	McDonalds Park	30 - 12	Cleary, Tamou	Cleary (1/1), Maloney (1/1)	10,079
Friday, 10 May	9	Wests Tigers	Suncorp Stadium	30 - 4	Whare	Cleary (0/1)	35,122
Friday, 17 May	10	New Zealand Warriors	Panthers Stadium	10 - 30	Martin, Kikau	Cleary (1/2)	10,084
Friday, 23 May	11	Parramatta Eels	Bankwest Stadium	10 - 16	Grant, Cleary	Cleary (4/4)	16,228
Thursday, 30 May	12	Manly-Warringah Sea Eagles	Panthers Stadium	15 - 12	Edwards, Martin	Maloney (2/2, 1 FG)	7,981
Sunday, 9 June	13	Sydney Roosters	Panthers Stadium	19 - 10	Kikau(2), Naden	Cleary (3/3), Maloney (1 FG)	16,833
Saturday, 15 June	14	South Sydney Rabbitohs	ANZ Stadium	18 - 19	Kikau, Naden, To'o	Cleary (2/3), Maloney (1 FG)	11,023
Sunday, 30 June	15	New Zealand Warriors	Mount Smart Stadium	18 - 19	Tamou, Naden (2)	Maloney (3/3, 1 FG)	12,952
	16	Bye					
Friday, 12 July	17	Gold Coast Titans	Panthers Stadium	24 - 2	Edwards(2), To'o(2)	Maloney (2/4)	10,317
Friday, 19 July	18	St George Illawarra Dragons	Panthers Stadium	40 - 18	To'o(2), Naden(2), Leota, Cleary, Campbell-Gillard	Nathan Cleary (6/7)	13,610
Friday, 28 July	19	Canberra Raiders	Panthers Stadium	18 - 30	To'o, Leota, Tamou	Cleary (3/4)	15,560
Saturday, 3 August	20	Canterbury-Bankstown Bulldogs	Bankwest Stadium	16 - 8	Naden	Cleary (2/2)	10,062
Friday, 9 August	21	Cronulla Sharks	Panthers Stadium	26 - 20	Naden, Edwards(2), Cleary	Cleary (5/5)	10,860
Friday, 16 August	22	Brisbane Broncos	Suncorp Stadium	24 - 12	Cleary, To'o	Cleary (2/2)	23,643
Friday, 23 August	23	North Queensland Cowboys	1300 Smiles Stadium	24 - 10	To'o, Yeo	Cleary (1/2)	10,523
Friday, 31 August	24	Sydney Roosters	Sydney Cricket Ground	22 - 6	Kikau	Cleary	11,311
Sunday, 8 September	25	Newcastle Knights	Panthers Stadium	54 - 10	Cleary(4), To'o, Burns(2), Egan, Leota	Cleary(9/9)	12,027
Legend: Win Loss Draw Bye

== Ladder ==
2019 NRL season
Pos	Team	Pld	W	D	L	B	PF	PA	PD	Pts
1	Melbourne Storm	24	20	0	4	1	631	300	+331	42
2	Sydney Roosters	24	17	0	7	1	627	363	+264	36
3	South Sydney Rabbitohs	24	16	0	8	1	521	417	+104	34
4	Canberra Raiders	24	15	0	9	1	524	374	+150	32
5	Parramatta Eels	24	14	0	10	1	533	473	+60	30
6	Manly-Warringah Sea Eagles	24	14	0	10	1	496	446	+50	30
7	Cronulla-Sutherland Sharks	24	12	0	12	1	514	464	+50	26
8	Brisbane Broncos	24	11	1	12	1	432	489	−57	25
9	Wests Tigers	24	11	0	13	1	475	486	−11	24
10	Penrith Panthers	24	11	0	13	1	413	474	−61	24
11	Newcastle Knights	24	10	0	14	1	485	522	−37	22
12	Canterbury-Bankstown Bulldogs	24	10	0	14	1	326	477	−151	22
13	New Zealand Warriors	24	9	1	14	1	433	574	−141	21
14	North Queensland Cowboys	24	9	0	15	1	378	500	−122	20
15	St. George Illawarra Dragons	24	8	0	16	1	427	575	−148	18
16	Gold Coast Titans	24	4	0	20	1	370	651	−281	10

== Other teams ==
In addition to competing in the National Rugby League, the Panthers are also fielding semi-professional teams in the 2019 Jersey Flegg Cup (for players aged under 20) and the New South Wales Rugby League's 2019 Canterbury Cup (NSW Cup).

== Representative honours ==
=== Domestic ===
Pos.	Player	Team	Call-up	Ref.
HB	Nathan Cleary	New South Wales	2019 State of Origin	
FE	James Maloney	New South Wales	2019 State of Origin	

=== International ===
Pos.	Player	Team	Call-up	Ref.
BE	James Fisher-Harris	Māori All Stars	2019 All Stars match	
PR	James Tamou	Māori All Stars	2019 All Stars match	
CE	Dean Whare	Māori All Stars	2019 All Stars match	
