= 2019 Canterbury-Bankstown Bulldogs season =

Canterbury-Bankstown Bulldogs
- 2019 season
- CEO: Andrew Hill
- Head coach: Dean Pay
- Captain: Josh Jackson
- NRL: 12th
- Top try scorer: Club: Reimis Smith 12
- Top points scorer: Club: Nick Meaney 88
- Highest home attendance: 30,014
- Lowest home attendance: 7,213
- Average home attendance: 13,914

The 2019 Canterbury-Bankstown Bulldogs season was the 85th in the club's history. Coached by Dean Pay, they finished the National Rugby League's 2019 Telstra Premiership in 12th place and did not qualify for the finals.

== Fixtures ==
=== Regular season ===
Round	Home	Score	Away	Match Information
Round	Home	Score	Away	Date and Time	Venue	Crowd
1	New Zealand Warriors	40 – 6	Canterbury-Bankstown Bulldogs	Sat 16 Mar, 5:00 pm NZST	Mt Smart Stadium	18,795
2	Canterbury-Bankstown Bulldogs	16 – 36	Parramatta Eels	Sun 24 Mar 4:05 pm AEDT	ANZ Stadium	20,134
3	Wests Tigers	8 – 22	Canterbury-Bankstown Bulldogs	Sun 31 Mar, 4:05 pm AEDT	Campbelltown Stadium	15,127
4	Melbourne Storm	18 – 16	Canterbury-Bankstown Bulldogs	Sun 7 Apr, 4:05 pm AEST	AAMI Park	15,432
5	St. George Illawarra Dragons	40 – 4	Canterbury-Bankstown Bulldogs	Sun 14 Apr, 4:05 pm AEST	Netstrata Jubilee Stadium	13,409
6	Canterbury-Bankstown Bulldogs	6 – 14	South Sydney Rabbitohs	Fri 19 Apr, 4:05 pm AEST	ANZ Stadium	30,040
7	Canterbury-Bankstown Bulldogs	24 – 12	North Queensland Cowboys	Fri 26 Apr, 6:00 pm AEST	ANZ Stadium	6,711
8	Manly Warringah Sea Eagles	18 – 10	Canterbury-Bankstown Bulldogs	Sat 4 May, 5:30 pm AEST	Lottoland Stadium	10,148
9	Canterbury-Bankstown Bulldogs	10 – 22	Newcastle Knights	Sat 11 May, 3:00 pm AEST	Suncorp Stadium	25,292
10	Gold Coast Titans	16 –22	Canterbury-Bankstown Bulldogs	Sat 18 May, 3:00 pm AEST	Cbus Super Stadium	10,105
11	Canterbury-Bankstown Bulldogs	6 –28	Melbourne Storm	Sun 26 May, 2:00 pm AEST	Belmore Oval	13,131
12	Canterbury-Bankstown Bulldogs	10 –12	Canberra Raiders	Sat 1 Jun, 7:35 pm AEST	ANZ Stadium	7,213
13	Canterbury-Bankstown Bulldogs	12 –36	St. George Illawarra Dragons	Mon 10 Jun, 4:00 pm AEST	ANZ Stadium	16,003
14	Sydney Roosters	38 –12	Canterbury-Bankstown Bulldogs	Sun 16 Jun, 4:05 pm AEST	Sydney Cricket Ground	8,217
15	Canterbury-Bankstown Bulldogs	14 –12	Cronulla Sutherland Sharks	Sat 30 Jun, 4:05 pm AEST	ANZ Stadium	8,358
16		BYE
17	Newcastle Knights	14 –20	Canterbury-Bankstown Bulldogs	Fri 12 Jul, 7:55 pm AEST	McDonald Jones Stadium	17,757
18	Brisbane Broncos	28 –6	Canterbury-Bankstown Bulldogs	Thur 18 Jul, 7:50 pm AEST	Suncorp Stadium	20,818
19	Canterbury-Bankstown Bulldogs	12 –20	Sydney Roosters	Sun 28 Jul, 2:00 pm AEST	ANZ Stadium	10,586
20	Canterbury-Bankstown Bulldogs	16 –8	Penrith Panthers	Sat 3 Aug, 5:30 pm AEST	Bankwest Stadium	10,062
21	Canterbury-Bankstown Bulldogs	18 –16	Wests Tigers	Sat 10 Aug, 7:35 pm AEST	ANZ Stadium	9,636
22	South Sydney Rabbitohs	6 –14	Canterbury-Bankstown Bulldogs	Sat 17 Aug, 7:35 pm AEST	ANZ Stadium	14,112
23	Parramatta Eels	6 –12	Canterbury-Bankstown Bulldogs	Thur 22 Aug, 7:50 pm AEST	Bankwest Stadium	18,071
24	North Queensland Cowboys	15 –8	Canterbury-Bankstown Bulldogs	Thur 29 Aug, 7:50 pm AEST	1300SMILES Stadium	15,141
25	Canterbury-Bankstown Bulldogs	30 –14	Brisbane Broncos	Sat 7 Sep, 5:30 pm AEST	ANZ Stadium	9,807
Legend: Win Loss Draw Bye

== Ladder ==
2019 NRL season
Pos	Team	Pld	W	D	L	B	PF	PA	PD	Pts
1	Melbourne Storm	24	20	0	4	1	631	300	+331	42
2	Sydney Roosters	24	17	0	7	1	627	363	+264	36
3	South Sydney Rabbitohs	24	16	0	8	1	521	417	+104	34
4	Canberra Raiders	24	15	0	9	1	524	374	+150	32
5	Parramatta Eels	24	14	0	10	1	533	473	+60	30
6	Manly-Warringah Sea Eagles	24	14	0	10	1	496	446	+50	30
7	Cronulla-Sutherland Sharks	24	12	0	12	1	514	464	+50	26
8	Brisbane Broncos	24	11	1	12	1	432	489	−57	25
9	Wests Tigers	24	11	0	13	1	475	486	−11	24
10	Penrith Panthers	24	11	0	13	1	413	474	−61	24
11	Newcastle Knights	24	10	0	14	1	485	522	−37	22
12	Canterbury-Bankstown Bulldogs	24	10	0	14	1	326	477	−151	22
13	New Zealand Warriors	24	9	1	14	1	433	574	−141	21
14	North Queensland Cowboys	24	9	0	15	1	378	500	−122	20
15	St. George Illawarra Dragons	24	8	0	16	1	427	575	−148	18
16	Gold Coast Titans	24	4	0	20	1	370	651	−281	10

== See also ==
- List of Canterbury-Bankstown Bulldogs seasons
