= 2019 St. George Illawarra Dragons season =

- NRL rank: 15th
- 2019 record: Wins: 8; draws: 0; losses: 16
- Points scored: For: 427; against: 575

Team information
- CEO: Brian Johnston
- Coach: Paul McGregor
- Captain: Gareth Widdop
- Stadium: Netstrata Jubilee Stadium, WIN Stadium
- Avg. attendance: 9,813
- High attendance: 14,586 (vs. Cronulla, round 11)

Top scorers
- Tries: Mikaele Ravalawa (11)
- Goals: Gareth Widdop (30)
- Points: Gareth Widdop (64)
← 2018	2020 →

The 2019 St. George Illawarra Dragons season was the 21st in the joint venture club's history. The Dragons' men's team competed in the NRL's 2019 Telstra Premiership season while the women completed their second year in the NRLW's 2019 Holden Women's Premiership season.

== Squad ==
St. George Illawarra Dragons 2019
First team squad			Development players	Coaching staff
Euan Aitken – CE, WG; Mitchell Allgood – PR; Jack de Belin – LK, PR; Matthew Dufty – FB; Jai Field – FB, HB; Tyson Frizell (vc) – SR, LK; James Graham – PR; Jacob Host – SR; Ben Hunt – HB, HK; Patrick Kaufusi – PR	Josh Kerr – SR, PR; Tim Lafai – CE; Jeremy Latimore – PR; Blake Lawrie – LK, PR; Luciano Leilua – SR, LK; Zac Lomax – FB, CE; Lachlan Maranta – WG; Cameron McInnes – HK; Darren Nicholls – HB; Corey Norman – FE, FB, HB	Jonus Pearson – WG; Jordan Pereira – WG, CE; Mikaele Ravalawa – WG, CE; Reece Robson – HK; Tristan Sailor – FE; Korbin Sims – PR, SR, LK; Tariq Sims – SR, LK; Lachlan Timm – PR; Paul Vaughan – PR; Gareth Widdop (c) – FE, FB (gk)	Eddie Blacker – PR; Jackson Ford – SR; Hayden Lomax – HK; Joe Lovodua – SR, HK, FE; Steve Marsters – FB, CE, WG; Jason Saab – WG	Head coach: Paul McGregor; Assistant coaches: Ian Millward – Director of Rugby League Pathways; Dean Young – Assistant Coach; Ben Hornby - Assistant Coach; Mathew Head – Assistant Coach / ISP Coach; Wayne Collins- Jersey Flegg Coach; Andrew Gray – Performance Director; Ciriaco Mescia – Strength & Conditioning Coach; Dan Lawson – Physiotherapist; Nathan Pickworth- Head of Athletic Performance; Legend: (c) Captain(s); (vc) Vice-captain(s); (gk) Goal kicker; Injured; Updated: 24 June 2019; Source(s): Dragons Squad

=== Gains and Losses ===
▲ or ▼	Player	2018 Club	2019 Club	Source
▲	Korbin Sims	Brisbane Broncos	St. George Illawarra Dragons	
▲	Patrick Kaufusi	Melbourne Storm	St. George Illawarra Dragons	
▲	Corey Norman	Parramatta Eels	St. George Illawarra Dragons	
▲	Lachlan Maranta	Queensland Reds (Super Rugby)	St. George Illawarra Dragons	
▼	Leeson Ah Mau	St. George Illawarra Dragons	New Zealand Warriors	
▼	Nene Macdonald	St. George Illawarra Dragons	North Queensland Cowboys	
▼	Kurt Mann	St. George Illawarra Dragons	Newcastle Knights	
▼	Jason Nightingale	St. George Illawarra Dragons	Retirement	

== Ladder ==
2019 NRL season
Pos	Team	Pld	W	D	L	B	PF	PA	PD	Pts
1	Melbourne Storm	24	20	0	4	1	631	300	+331	42
2	Sydney Roosters	24	17	0	7	1	627	363	+264	36
3	South Sydney Rabbitohs	24	16	0	8	1	521	417	+104	34
4	Canberra Raiders	24	15	0	9	1	524	374	+150	32
5	Parramatta Eels	24	14	0	10	1	533	473	+60	30
6	Manly-Warringah Sea Eagles	24	14	0	10	1	496	446	+50	30
7	Cronulla-Sutherland Sharks	24	12	0	12	1	514	464	+50	26
8	Brisbane Broncos	24	11	1	12	1	432	489	−57	25
9	Wests Tigers	24	11	0	13	1	475	486	−11	24
10	Penrith Panthers	24	11	0	13	1	413	474	−61	24
11	Newcastle Knights	24	10	0	14	1	485	522	−37	22
12	Canterbury-Bankstown Bulldogs	24	10	0	14	1	326	477	−151	22
13	New Zealand Warriors	24	9	1	14	1	433	574	−141	21
14	North Queensland Cowboys	24	9	0	15	1	378	500	−122	20
15	St. George Illawarra Dragons	24	8	0	16	1	427	575	−148	18
16	Gold Coast Titans	24	4	0	20	1	370	651	−281	10

=== Ladder Progression ===
Round	1	2	3	4	5	6	7	8	9	10	11	12	13	14	15	16	17	18	19	20	21	22	23	24	25
Ladder Position	13th	14th	11th	10th	7th	6th	8th	8th	10th	12th	13th	13th	10th	13th	10th	12th	14th	14th	14th	14th	14th	14th	15th	15th	15th

== Season Results ==
=== Pre-Season Trials ===
Round	Home	Score	Away	Match information
Round	Home	Score	Away	Date and time (AEDT)	Venue	Referee	Attendance	Source
1	St George Illawarra Dragons	18 – 10	Newcastle Knights	Saturday, 23 February, 4:00 pm	WIN Stadium	Adam Gee, Todd Smith	—
2 (Charity Shield)	South Sydney Rabbitohs	36 – 24	St George Illawarra Dragons	Saturday, 2 March, 7:30 pm	Glen Willow Regional Sports Stadium	Ashley Klein, Chris Butler	9,027

=== NRL Season ===
Round	Home	Score	Away	Match information
Round	Home	Score	Away	Date and time (AEDT)	Venue	Referee	Attendance	Source
1	North Queensland Cowboys	24 – 12	St George Illawarra Dragons	Saturday, 16 March, 7:35 pm	1300Smiles Stadium	Ben Cummins, Ziggy Przeklasa-Adamski	18,415
2	St George Illawarra Dragons	18 – 34	South Sydney Rabbitohs	Thursday, 21 March, 7:55 pm	Netstrata Jubilee Stadium	Gerard Sutton, Peter Gough	10,080
3	Brisbane Broncos	24 – 25	St George Illawarra Dragons	Thursday, 28 March, 7:55 pm	Suncorp Stadium	Ben Cummins, Ziggy Przeklasa-Adamski	21,081
4	Newcastle Knights	12 – 13	St George Illawarra Dragons	Sunday, 7 April, 6:10 pm	McDonald Jones Stadium	Matt Cecchin, Adam Cassidy	19,105
5	St George Illawarra Dragons	40 – 4	Canterbury-Bankstown Bulldogs	Sunday, 14 April, 4:05 pm	Netstrata Jubilee Oval	Ashley Klein, Gerard Sutton	13,409
6	St George Illawarra Dragons	12 – 10	Manly Warringah Sea Eagles	Saturday, 20 April, 7:35 pm	WIN Stadium	David Munro, Liam Kennedy	14,268
7 (ANZAC Day)	Sydney Roosters	20 – 10	St George Illawarra Dragons	Thursday, 25 April, 4:05 pm	Sydney Cricket Ground	Ben Cummins, Grant Atkins	38,414
8	Parramatta Eels	32 – 18	St George Illawarra Dragons	Sunday, 5 May, 4:05 pm	Bankwest Stadium	Ashley Klein, Chris Butler	25,872
9 (Magic Round)	New Zealand Warriors	26 – 18	St George Illawarra Dragons	Saturday, 11 May, 5:30 pm	Suncorp Stadium	Adam Gee, Gavin Badger	41,612
10	St George Illawarra Dragons	12 – 45	Newcastle Knights	Sunday, 19 May, 2:00 pm	Glen Willow Regional Sports Stadium	Gerard Sutton, Liam Kennedy	9,267
11	St George Illawarra Dragons	9 – 22	Cronulla-Sutherland Sharks	Sunday, 26 May, 4:05 pm	WIN Stadium	Adam Gee, Gavin Badger	14,586
12		BYE
13 (Queen's Birthday)	Canterbury-Bankstown Bulldogs	12 – 36	St George Illawarra Dragons	Monday, 10 June, 4:05 pm	ANZ Stadium	Gerard Sutton, Liam Kennedy	16,003
14	Manly Warringah Sea Eagles	14 – 34	St George Illawarra Dragons	Sunday, 16 June, 2:00 pm	Lottoland	Chris Sutton, Phil Henderson	8,468
15	St George Illawarra Dragons	22 – 14	North Queensland Cowboys	Friday, 28 June, 6:00 pm	WIN Stadium	Henry Perenara, Liam Kennedy	7,008
16	St George Illawarra Dragons	14 – 16	Melbourne Storm	Thursday, 4 July, 7:55 pm	WIN Stadium	Ben Cummins, David Munro	5,578
17	St George Illawarra Dragons	14 – 36	Canberra Raiders	Sunday, 14 July, 6:10 pm	WIN Stadium	Ashley Klein	9,159
18	Penrith Panthers	40 – 18	St George Illawarra Dragons	Friday, 19 July, 7:55 pm	Panthers Stadium	Grant Atkins, Jon Stone	13,610
19	South Sydney Rabbitohs	20 – 16	St George Illawarra Dragons	Friday, 26 July, 7:55 pm	ANZ Stadium	Gerard Sutton, Matt Noyen	12,318
20	St George Illawarra Dragons	4 – 12	Parramatta Eels	Sunday, 4 August, 4:05 pm	Netstrata Jubilee Stadium	Ashley Klein	9,645
21	St George Illawarra Dragons	40 – 28	Gold Coast Titans	Saturday, 10 August, 3:00 pm	Netstrata Jubilee Stadium	Henry Perenara, Liam Kennedy	6,532
22	Cronulla-Sutherland Sharks	18 – 12	St George Illawarra Dragons	Sunday, 18 August, 4:05 pm	Southern Cross Group Stadium	Adam Gee, Jon Stone	13,652
23	St George Illawarra Dragons	12 – 34	Sydney Roosters	Saturday, 24 August, 7:35 pm	Netstrata Jubilee Stadium	Chris Sutton, Belinda Sharpe	9,087
24	St George Illawarra Dragons	14 – 42	Wests Tigers	Sunday, 1 September, 4:05 pm	Sydney Cricket Ground	Matt Cecchin, Ziggy Przeklasa-Adamski	9,136
25	Gold Coast Titans	16 – 24	St George Illawarra Dragons	Saturday, 7 September, 7:35 pm	Cbus Super Stadium	Ziggy Przeklasa-Adamski, Gavin Badger	11,274

== Representative Honours ==
The following players have played a representative match in 2019.

Player	2019 All Stars match	State of Origin 1	2019 Oceania Cup and Internationals	State of Origin 2	State of Origin 3	World Cup 9s	Prime Minister's XIII	2019 Oceania Cup, 2019 Great Britain Lions tour and Internationals
Josh Kerr	Indigenous All Stars	–	–	–	–	–	–	–
Ben Hunt	–	Queensland	–	Queensland	Queensland	Australia	Prime Minister's XIII	Australia
Paul Vaughan	–	New South Wales	–	New South Wales	New South Wales	–	–	Australia
Tyson Frizell	–	New South Wales	–	New South Wales	New South Wales	Australia	Prime Minister's XIII	Australia
Mikaele Ravalawa	–	–	Fiji	–	–	–	–	–
Korbin Sims	–	–	Fiji	–	–	–	–	–
Steven Marsters	–	–	Cook Islands	–	–	Cook Islands	–	–
Tariq Sims	–	–	–	New South Wales	–	–	–	–
Corey Norman	–	–	–	–	Queensland	–	–	–
James Graham	–	–	–	–	–	England	–	Great Britain
Gareth Widdop	–	–	–	–	–	England	–	Great Britain
Tim Lafai	–	–	–	–	–	Samoa	–	Samoa
Luciano Leilua	–	–	–	–	–	Samoa		Samoa

== NRL Women's ==
2019 St. George Illawarra Dragons season
- NRL Women's rank: 2nd
- 2019 record: Wins: 2; draws: 0; losses: 1
- Points scored: For: 54; against: 36

Team information
- Coach: Daniel Lacey
- Captain: Sam Bremner

Top scorers
- Tries: Jessica Sergis (3)
- Goals: Maddie Studdon (8)
- Points: Maddie Studdon (16)

=== Ladder ===
2019 NRL Women's season
Pos	Team	Pld	W	D	L	PF	PA	PD	Pts
1	Brisbane Broncos	3	2	0	1	42	14	+28	4
2	St. George Illawarra Dragons	3	2	0	1	54	36	+18	4
3	New Zealand Warriors	3	2	0	1	32	46	−14	4
4	Sydney Roosters	3	0	0	3	28	60	−32	0

==== Ladder Progression ====
Round	1	2	3
Ladder Position	4th	2nd	2nd

=== Season Results ===
Round	Home	Score	Away	Match information
Round	Home	Score	Away	Date and time (AEDT)	Venue	Referee	Attendance	Source
1	St George Illawarra Dragons	4 – 14	Brisbane Broncos	Sunday, 15 September, 2:05 pm	Bankwest Stadium	Adam Cassidy, Martin Jones	—^{1}
2	New Zealand Warriors	6 – 26	St George Illawarra Dragons	Sunday, 22 September, 1:15 pm	Mount Smart Stadium	Kasey Badger, Ethan Menchin	—
3	St George Illawarra Dragons	24 – 16	Sydney Roosters	Sunday, 29 September, 1:15 pm	Leichhardt Oval	Kasey Badger, Daniel Schwass	2,293
Grand Final	Brisbane Broncos	30 – 6	St George Illawarra Dragons	Sunday, 6 October, 4:00 pm	ANZ Stadium	Kasey Badger, Daniel Schwass	—^{2}

==== Notes ====
- 1: This match was a curtain-raiser to the Parramatta Eels vs Brisbane Broncos finals match, which got a crowd of 29,372.
- 2: This match was a curtain-raiser to the NRL Grand Final, which got a crowd of 82,922.
