= Mawene Hiroti =

New Zealand rugby league footballer

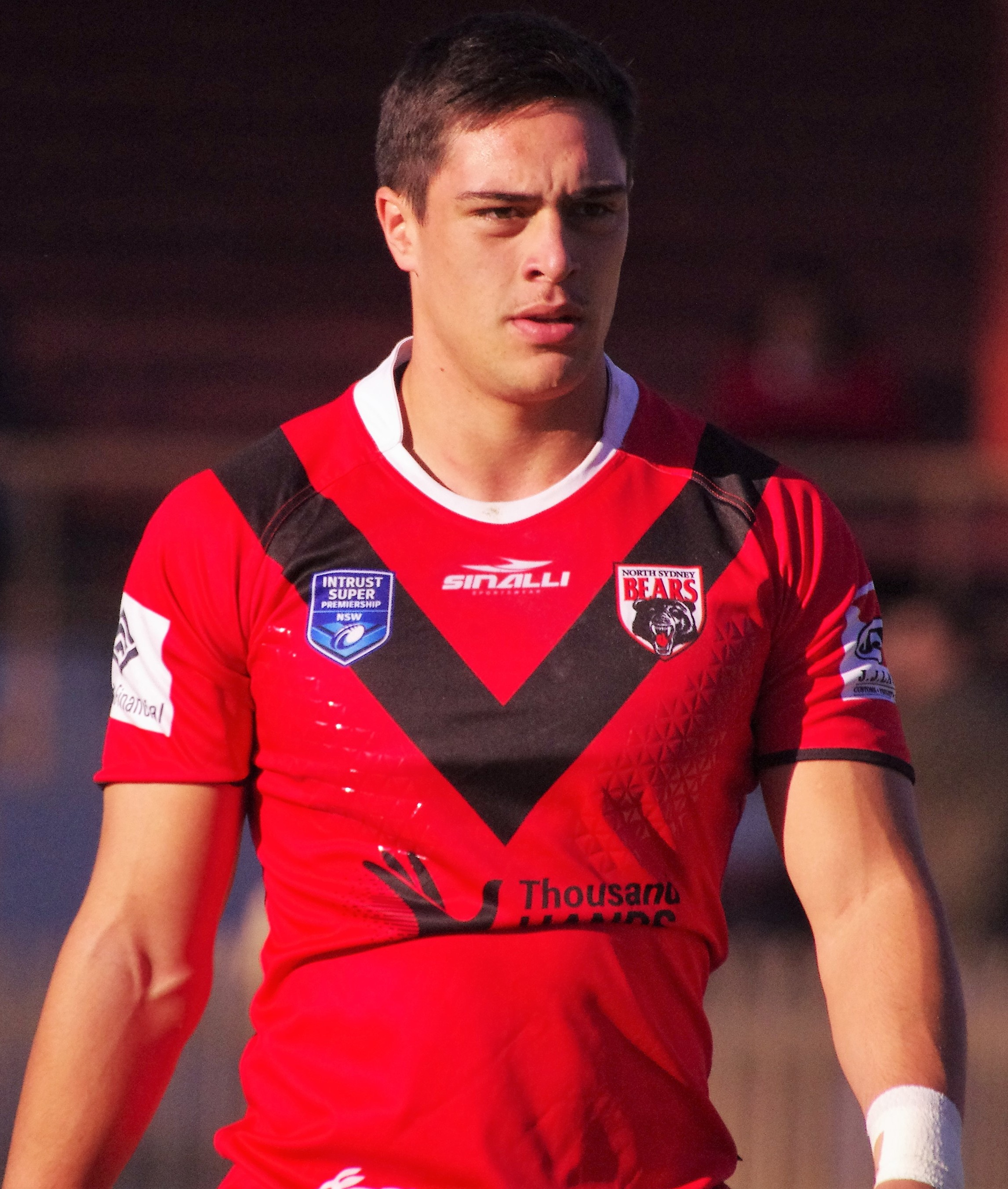

Personal information
- Full name: Mawene Hiroti
- Born: 6 March 1999 (age 27) Taranaki, New Zealand
- Height: 187 cm (6 ft 2 in)
- Weight: 95 kg (14 st 13 lb)

Playing information
- Position: Wing, Centre, Fullback
Club
Years	Team	Pld	T	G	FG	P
2018–19	South Sydney	5	1	0	0	4
2020–26	Cronulla Sharks	41	15	5	0	70
2027–	Gold Coast Titans	0	0	0	0	0
	Total	46	16	5	0	74
Representative
Years	Team	Pld	T	G	FG	P
2018	NSW Residents	1	0	0	0	0
2025	Māori All Stars	1	0	0	0	0
- Source: As of 19 September 2026

Mawene Hiroti (born 6 March 1999) is a New Zealand rugby league footballer who plays as a centre or winger for the Cronulla-Sutherland Sharks in the NRL.

He previously played for the South Sydney Rabbitohs in the National Rugby League.

== Background ==
Hiroti was born in Taranaki on the North Island of New Zealand.

== Playing career ==
=== 2016 ===
Educated at Matraville Sports High School he represented the 2016 Australian Schoolboys and the New Zealand Under 18s.

=== 2018 ===
He played for South Sydney in their pre-season 18–8 victory over Super League team, the Wigan Warriors.

Hiroti made his first-grade debut for South Sydney in Round 23 2018 against Brisbane at Suncorp Stadium which ended in a 38–18 loss. Hiroti spent the majority of the season playing for South Sydney's feeder club side North Sydney in the Intrust Super Premiership NSW. At the end of 2018, Hiroti was named as North Sydney's most improved player.

=== 2019 ===
On 29 September 2019, Hiroti was named in the 2019 Canterbury Cup NSW team of the year.

=== 2020 ===
Signing with Cronulla-Sutherland prior to the 2020 season, Hiroti spent the majority of the season training with the clubs' feeder side Newtown before the reserve grade season was cancelled due to the COVID-19 pandemic. He made two appearances with the top-flight squad in 2020.

=== 2021 ===
After both of Cronulla's usual wingers were struck with injury, Hiroti took a bigger role with the NRL side to open the 2021 NRL season, managing six appearances through the first eight rounds, managing four tries.

On 2 September, Hiroti signed a one-year extension to remain at Cronulla for the 2022 season. Hiroti played 15 games for Cronulla in the 2021 NRL season which saw the club narrowly miss the finals by finishing 9th on the table.

=== 2022 & 2023 ===
Hiroti made only two appearances for Cronulla in the 2022 NRL season. In the 2023 NRL season, Hiroti made just one appearance for Cronulla where he scored a try in the clubs round 23 victory over South Sydney.

=== 2024 ===
On 29 September, Hiroti played for Newtown in their 2024 NSW Cup Grand Final victory over North Sydney. Subsequently, he signed a one-year extension with Cronulla.

=== 2025 ===
In round 5 of the 2025 NRL season, Hiroti was called into the Cronulla side for their game against Canberra. He scored a try in Cronulla's 24–20 loss. Hiroti played nine games for Cronulla in the 2025 NRL season as the club finished 5th on the table. On 22 November 2025, the Sharks announced that Hiroti had extended his contract with the club for a further year.

=== 2026 ===
On 2 January 2026, the Gold Coast Titans announced they had signed Hiroti from 2027 on a two-year deal. Hiroti played 12 matches for Cronulla in the 2026 NRL season as the club finished 5th on the table and qualified for the finals.

== Statistics ==
=== NRL ===
Season	Team	Matches	T	G	GK %	F/G	Pts
2018	South Sydney	1	0	0	—	0	0
2019	South Sydney	4	1	0	—	0	4
2020	Cronulla-Sutherland	2	1	4/5	80.00%	0	12
2021	Cronulla-Sutherland	14	5	0	—	0	20
2022	Cronulla-Sutherland	2	0	0	—	0	0
2023	Cronulla-Sutherland	1	1				4
2024	Cronulla-Sutherland	1	1				4
2025	Cronulla-Sutherland	9	5				20
2026	Cronulla-Sutherland	12	2	1			10
Career totals		46	16	5	80.00%	0	74
