= Ethan Parry =

Australian rugby league footballer

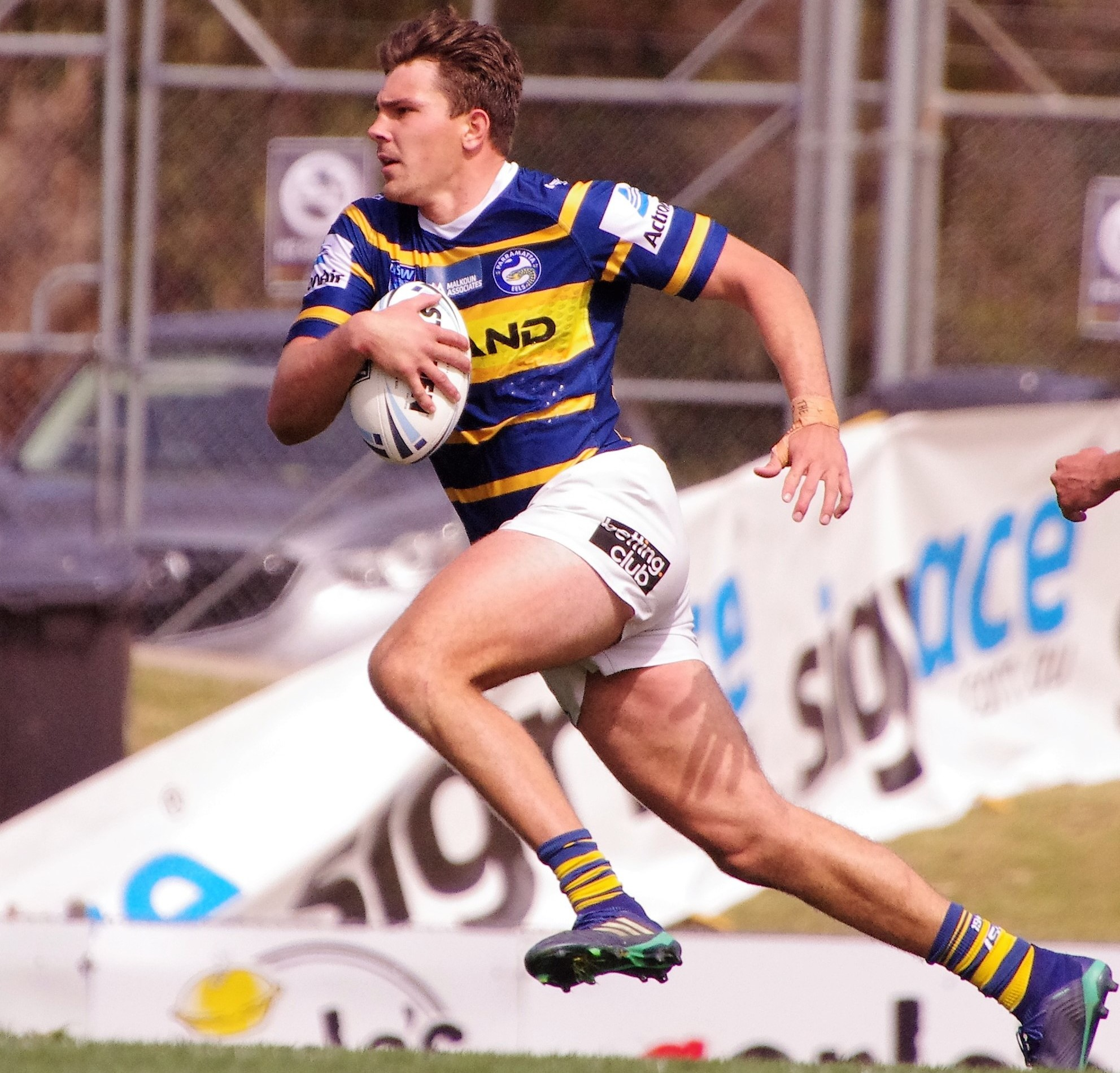

Personal information
- Born: 20 March 1999 (age 27) Tamworth, New South Wales, Australia
- Height: 195 cm (6 ft 5 in)
- Weight: 106 kg (16 st 10 lb)

Playing information
- Position: Centre, Wing
Club
Years	Team	Pld	T	G	FG	P
2019	Parramatta Eels	2	2	0	0	8
- Source: As of 24 May 2020

Ethan Parry (born 20 March 1999) is an Australian professional indigenous rugby league footballer who last played as a centre and winger for the Parramatta Eels in the NRL.

== Background ==
Parry was born in Tamworth, New South Wales, Australia. He played his junior rugby league for the West Tamworth Lions and was educated at Oxley High School and St Gregory's College, Campbelltown.

== Career ==
Parry was signed by Parramatta as a 15 year old, playing Harold Matthews and S.G. Ball for the Eels on the wing, before being picked for the Australian Schoolboys and NSW under 18's in 2017. In 2018, Parry played Jersey Flegg for the Eels, before debuting for Wentworthville in NSW Cup later in the year. In 2019, Parry trained full-time with first grade, appearing in trials. Parry was selected for NSW under 20's team while playing the whole year for Wentworthville at centre.

In round 18 of the 2019 NRL season, Parry made his NRL debut for Parramatta against the Manly-Warringah Sea Eagles in a 36-24 loss at Brookvale Oval, scoring a try. The following week, Parry appeared again on the wing scoring a try against the New Zealand Warriors in a 24-22 win at Bankwest Stadium.

For much of the 2019 season, Parry played for Wentworthville in the Canterbury Cup NSW competition. Parry played in the club's 2019 grand final defeat against Newtown at the Western Sydney Stadium.

On 24 May 2020, Parry was mutually released by the Parramatta Eels.

Parry is currently contracted to the Maitland Pickers in the Newcastle Rugby League Competition.
