= Billy Brittain =

Australian rugby league footballer

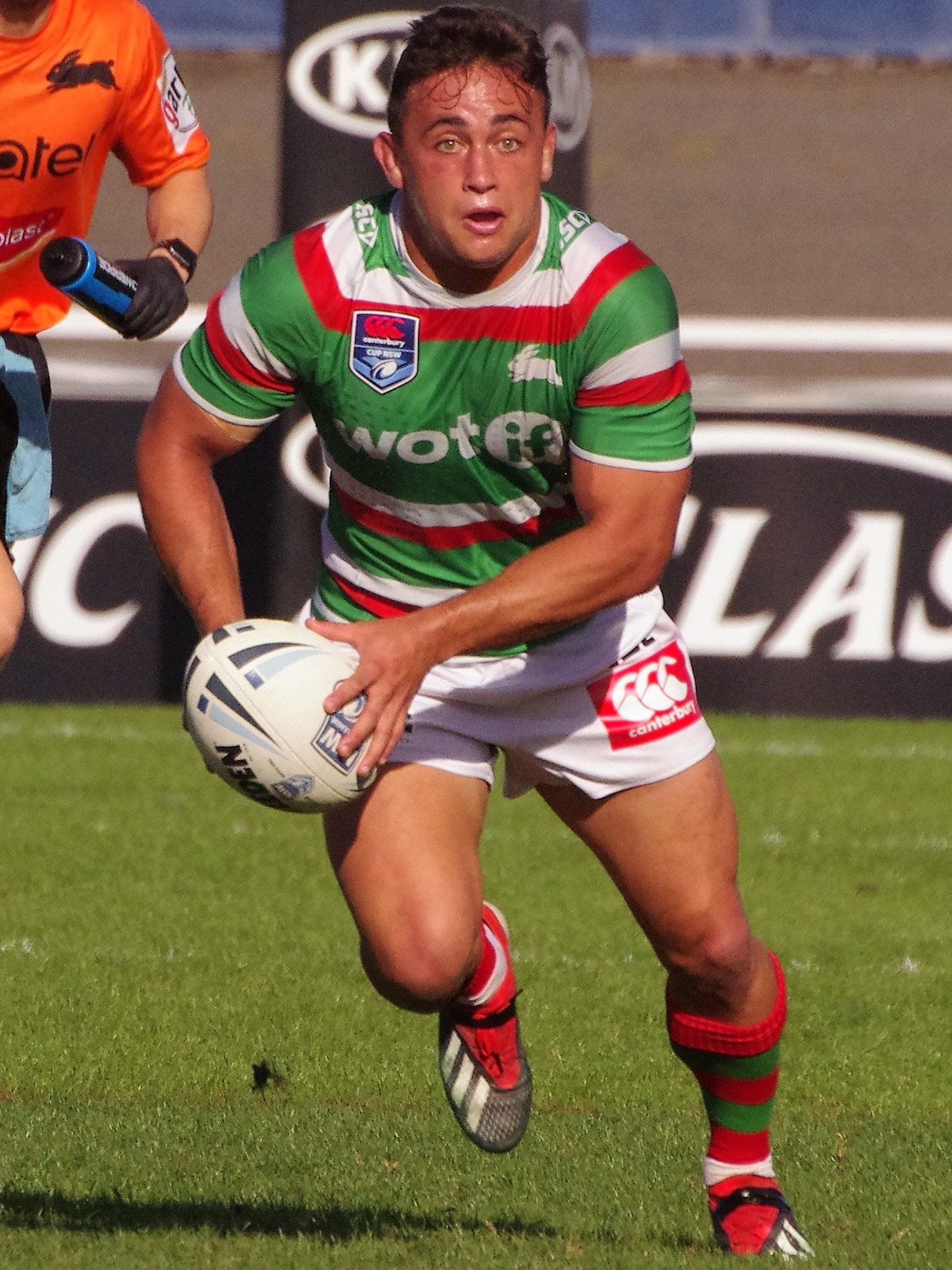

Personal information
- Born: 19 May 1994 (age 30); Brisbane, Queensland, Australia
- Height: 175 cm (5 ft 9 in)
- Weight: 84 kg (13 st 3 lb)

Playing information
- Position: Hooker
Club
Years	Team	Pld	T	G	FG	P
2019	South Sydney	2	0	0	0	0
2020–21	St. George Illawarra	5	0	0	0	0
	Total	7	0	0	0	0
Representative
Years	Team	Pld	T	G	FG	P
2018	NSW Residents	1	0	0	0	0
- Source: As of 11 January 2024

Billy Brittain is an Australian professional rugby league footballer who last played as a hooker for St. George Illawarra in the NRL.

He previously played for the South Sydney Rabbitohs in the National Rugby League.

== Career ==
=== 2018 ===
Brittain joined South Sydney in 2018 but spent the entire season playing for the club's then feeder side and foundation club North Sydney.

Brittain was selected to play for the NSW Residents team against the Queensland residents midway through the year. At the end of the season, Brittain was named as North Sydney's best and fairest player.

=== 2019 ===
At the start of 2019, Brittain remained in the Canterbury Cup NSW side for Souths and was selected to captain the NSW Residents side against Queensland for a second consecutive year.

Brittain made his NRL debut in round 12 of the 2019 NRL season for South Sydney in their 26-14 loss to the Parramatta Eels.

On 9 September 2019, Brittain was named the Canterbury Cup NSW player of the year. On 29 September 2019, Brittain was named in the 2019 Canterbury Cup NSW team of the season.

=== 2020 ===
On 20 February 2020, Brittain signed a contract to join St. George Illawarra for the 2020 NRL season. Brittain made his debut for St. George Illawarra in round 1 of the 2020 NRL season against the Wests Tigers at WIN Stadium.

=== 2021 ===
On 16 September, it was announced that Brittain had been released by St. George Illawarra.
