= Tevita Tatola =

Tonga international rugby league footballer

Junior Tatola
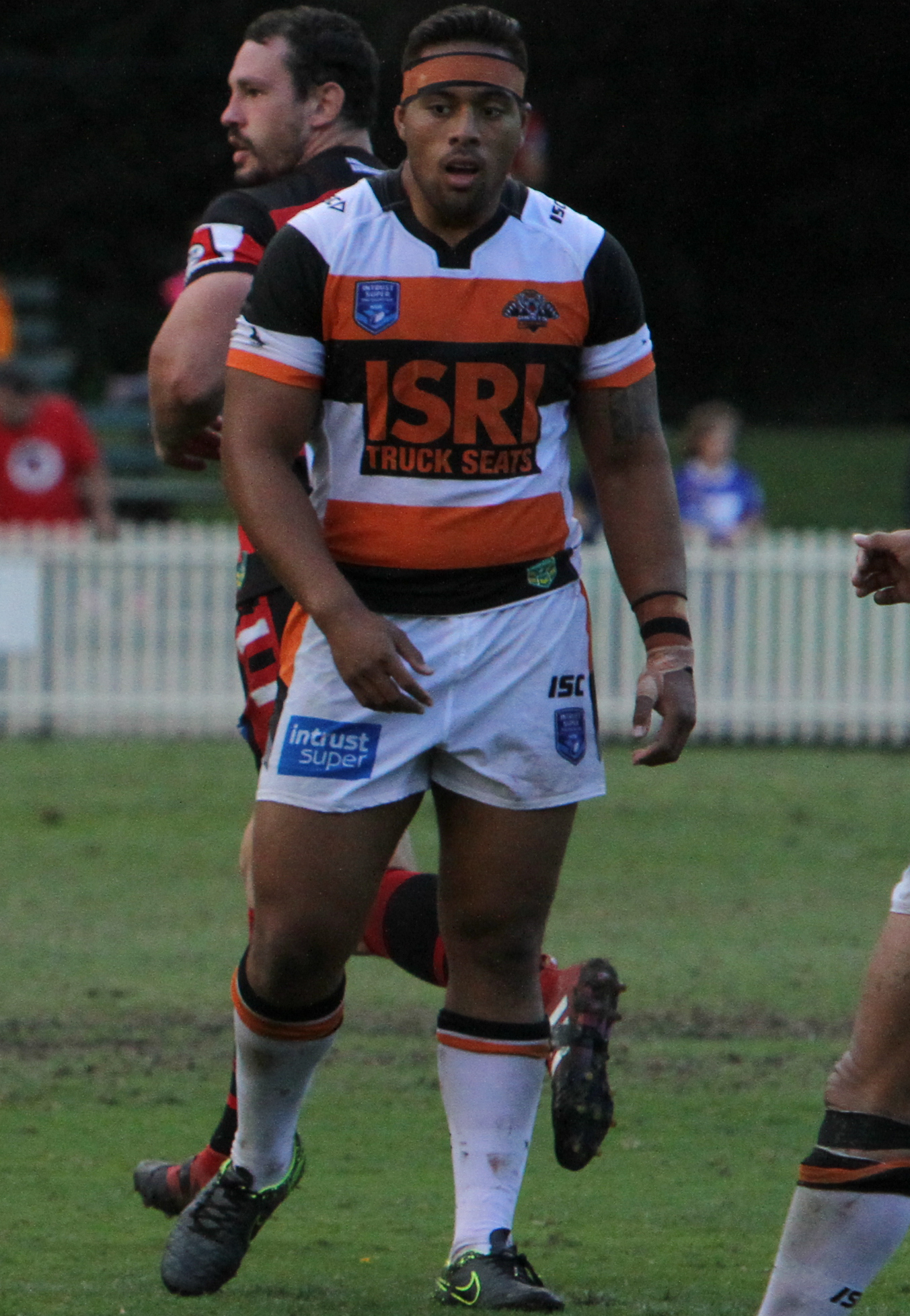

Personal information
- Full name: Tevita Junior Tatola
- Born: 10 November 1996 (age 29) Auburn, New South Wales, Australia
- Height: 183 cm (6 ft 0 in)
- Weight: 114 kg (17 st 13 lb)

Playing information
- Position: Prop
Club
Years	Team	Pld	T	G	FG	P
2018–	South Sydney	183	13	0	0	52
Representative
Years	Team	Pld	T	G	FG	P
2018–22	Tonga	8	1	0	0	4
- Source: As of 11 September 2026

Tevita Junior Tatola (born 10 November 1996) is a Tonga international rugby league footballer who plays as a prop for the South Sydney Rabbitohs in the NRL.

== Background ==
Tatola was born in Auburn, New South Wales, Australia. He is of Tongan descent.

He played his junior rugby league for the Berala Bears and Holy Cross Rhinos, before being signed by the Wests Tigers.

== Playing career ==
=== Early career ===
From 2015 to 2016, Tatola played for the Wests Tigers' NYC team, co-captaining the side in 2016. On 7 May 2016, he played for the Junior Kangaroos against the Junior Kiwis. In 2017, he graduated to the Tigers' Intrust Super Premiership NSW team. In December 2017, he signed a one-year contract with South Sydney starting in 2018.

=== 2018 ===
In round 1 of the 2018 NRL season, Tatola made his NRL debut for South Sydney against the New Zealand Warriors. In September, he re-signed with the South Sydney Rabbitohs on a one-year deal till the end of 2019.

=== 2019 ===
Tatola was part of the Souths side which started the 2019 NRL season with ten wins and three losses. Tatola scored his first NRL try for Souths against Parramatta in their 14–26 loss at Bankwest Stadium.

Tatola played in every match of the 2019 NRL season as Souths finished third on the table and qualified for the finals. Tatola played in the club's preliminary final defeat against the Canberra Raiders at Canberra Stadium.

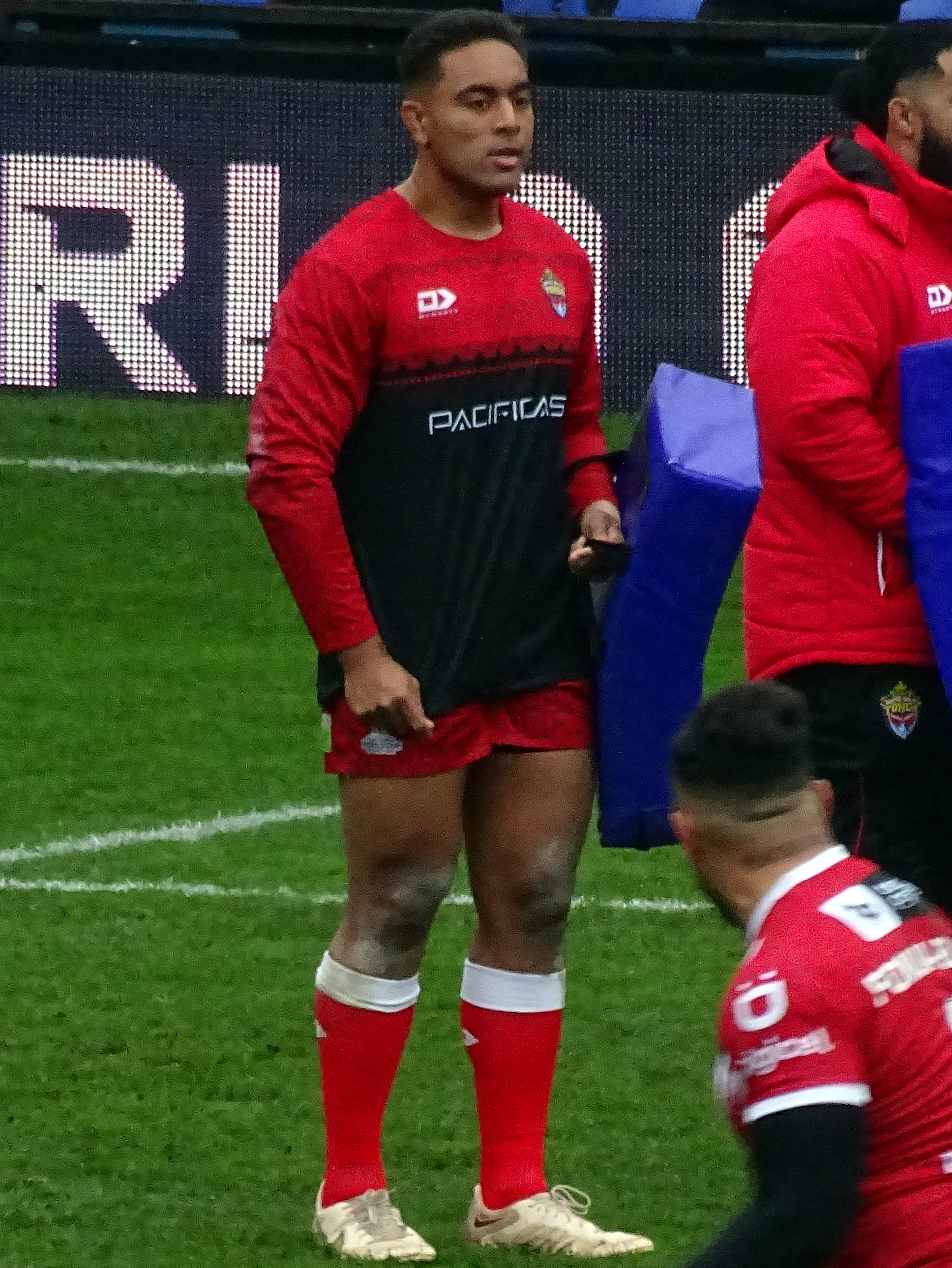
Tatola with Tonga at the 2021 RLWC

=== 2020 ===
In round 15 of the 2020 NRL season, he scored his first try of the season as South Sydney defeated Manly-Warringah 56–16 at ANZ Stadium.

In the 2020 elimination final, he scored two tries in South Sydney's 46–20 victory over Newcastle at ANZ Stadium.

Tatola played 21 games for South Sydney throughout the year as the club reached their third straight preliminary final but once again fell short of a grand final appearance losing to Penrith 20–16.

=== 2021 ===
Tatola played a total of 21 games for South Sydney in the 2021 NRL season including the club's 2021 NRL Grand Final defeat against Penrith.

=== 2022 ===
In the first week of the finals series, Tatola was sent to the sin bin during South Sydney's upset 30–14 victory over arch-rivals the Sydney Roosters.

Tatola played 26 games for South Sydney in the 2022 NRL season including all three of the clubs finals matches as they reached the preliminary final for a fifth straight season. Souths would lose in the preliminary final to eventual premiers Penrith 32–12.

In October, Tatola was awarded with the George Piggins medal after being voted as South Sydney's best player throughout the season.

In October he was named in the Tonga squad for the 2021 Rugby League World Cup.

=== 2023 ===
Tatola played a total of 15 games for Souths in the 2023 NRL season as the club finished 9th on the table and missed the finals.

=== 2024 ===
Following South Sydney's round 6 loss against Cronulla, it was announced that Tatola would miss at least 12 weeks with a fractured foot. Tatola was limited to only six games for South Sydney in the 2024 NRL season as the club finished second last on the table.

=== 2025 ===
Following South Sydney's 30-4 round 9 loss against Newcastle, Tatola was demoted from the first grade team by head coach Wayne Bennett. Tatola was ruled out for the rest of the season after suffering a shoulder dislocation.

=== 2026 ===
Tatola played 25 matches for South Sydney in the 2026 NRL season as the club finished 6th on the table and qualified for the finals.

== Statistics ==
*stats are correct as of round 7 2026

Year	Team	Games	Tries	Pts
2018	South Sydney Rabbitohs	24		
2019	South Sydney Rabbitohs	27	2	8
2020	South Sydney Rabbitohs	21	3	12
2021	South Sydney Rabbitohs	21		
2022	South Sydney Rabbitohs	26	4	16
2023	South Sydney Rabbitohs	15		
2024	South Sydney Rabbitohs	6		
2025	South Sydney Rabbitohs	18	2	8
2026	South Sydney Rabbitohs	6		
	Totals	164	11	44
