= Jacob Gagan =

Australian rugby league footballer (born 1993)

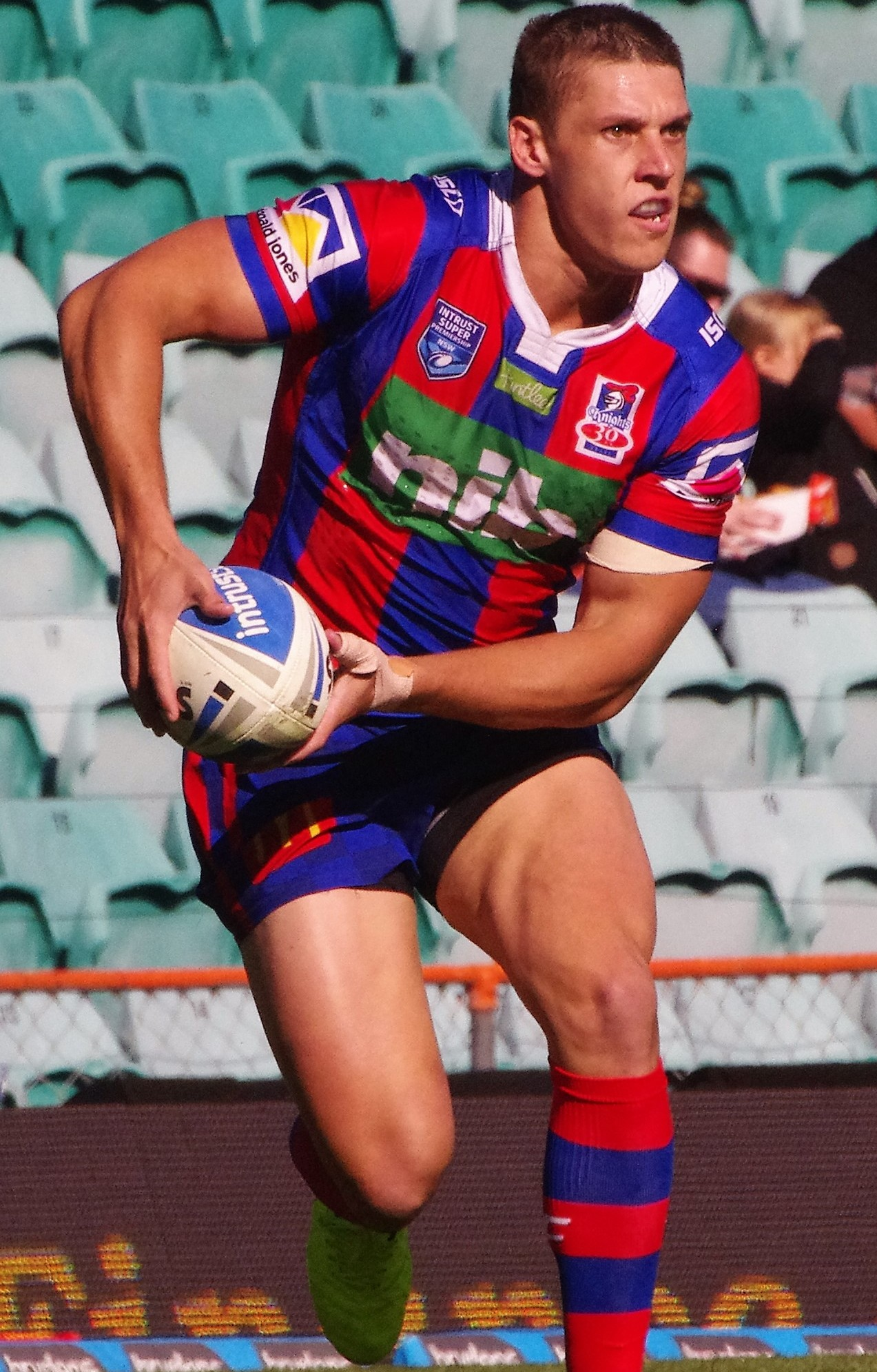
- Gagan in 2017

Personal information
- Born: 25 March 1993 (age 33) Westmead, New South Wales, Australia
- Height: 184 cm (6 ft 0 in)
- Weight: 94 kg (14 st 11 lb)

Playing information
- Position: Wing, Centre
Club
Years	Team	Pld	T	G	FG	P
2014	Cronulla Sharks	7	5	0	0	20
2017	Newcastle Knights	1	1	0	0	4
2019	South Sydney	1	0	0	0	0
2020	FC Lezignan	6	4	0	0	16
	Total	15	10	0	0	40
- Source: As of 16 November 2023

Jacob Gagan (born 25 March 1993) is an Australian professional rugby league footballer currently playing for the Norths Devils in the Queensland Cup.

He previously played for the Cronulla-Sutherland Sharks, Newcastle Knights and the South Sydney Rabbitohs in the National Rugby League and for FC Lezignan in the Elite One Championship.

== Background ==
Born in Westmead, New South Wales, Gagan played his junior rugby league for the Cabramatta Two Blues, before being signed by the Parramatta Eels.

== Playing career ==
=== Early career ===
From 2010 to 2012, Gagan played for the Parramatta Eels' NYC team. In 2010, he played for the Australian Schoolboys. In 2013, he joined the Manly Warringah Sea Eagles on a one-year contract. In November 2013, he signed a one-year contract with the Cronulla-Sutherland Sharks starting in 2014.

=== 2014 ===
In round 13 of the 2014 NRL season, Gagan made his NRL debut for Cronulla-Sutherland against the St. George Illawarra Dragons, playing on the wing in the Sharks' 0–30 loss at WIN Stadium. In July, he re-signed with Cronulla on a two-year contract. Gagan made a total of seven appearances for Cronulla in the 2014 NRL season as the club finished last on the table.

=== 2016 ===
In November, after missing out on NRL selection for Cronulla-Sutherland throughout the entire 2015 and 2016 seasons, Gagan signed a one-year contract with the Newcastle Knights starting in 2017.

=== 2017 ===
Gagan made his Knights debut in round 5 of the 2017 season against his former club Cronulla-Sutherland, scoring a try. That would be his lone appearance for the Knights as he was not offered a new contract beyond 2017. In November, he signed a 1-year contract with the South Sydney Rabbitohs starting in 2018.

=== 2018 ===
Gagan spent the entirety of 2018 playing for foundation club North Sydney in the Intrust Super Premiership NSW competition.

=== 2019 ===
Gagan made his debut for South Sydney in round 3 of the 2019 NRL season against Manly-Warringah after being called into the side as a replacement for the injured Greg Inglis.

=== 2020 ===
In February, it was revealed that Gagan had been released by South Sydney.

On 26 June 2020, it was reported that he had signed for FC Lézignan XIII in the Elite One Championship.

=== 2021 & 2022 ===
In 2021, Gagan joined Queensland Cup side Norths. The Norths Devils would go on to win the Queensland Cup Grand Final in both 2021 and 2022. Gagan was named as Man of the Match and the Duncan Hall Medal winner in the 2022 Queensland Cup Grand Final. In late 2022, Gagan signed a contract to join one of his former teams in Newtown ahead of the 2023 NSW Cup season.

=== 2023 ===
On 17 August, Gagan re-joined the Norths Devils after leaving Newtown earlier in the year on compassionate grounds.

=== 2024 ===
In 2024 Gagan won the Queensland Cup starting at centre for the Norths Devils in their grand final win over the Redcliffe Dolphins. Two weeks later he also played in their NRL State Championship win over NSW Cup premiers the Newtown Jets.
