= Kurt Dillon =

Australian rugby league footballer

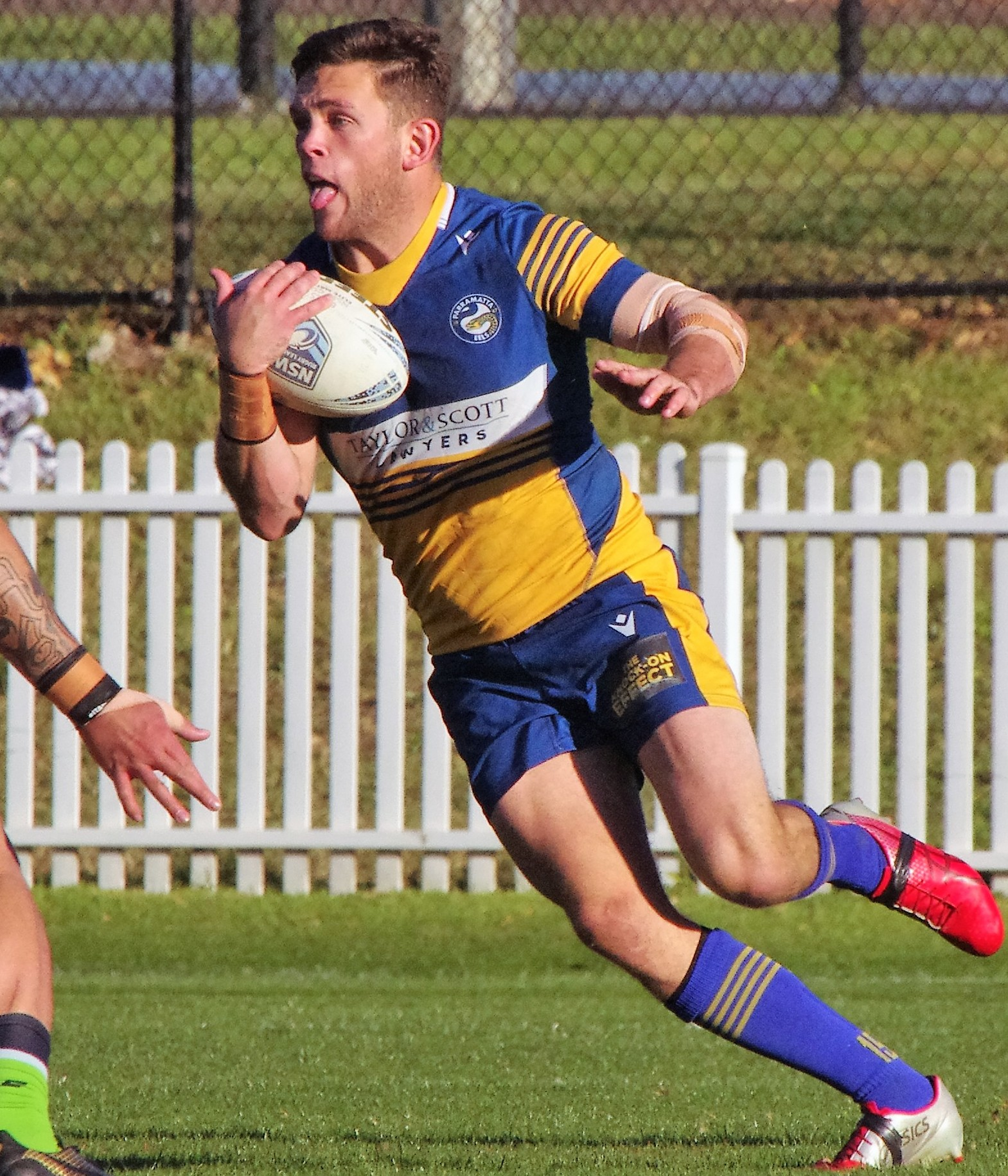

Personal information
- Born: 8 August 1994 (age 32) Sydney, New South Wales, Australia
- Height: 190 cm (6 ft 3 in)
- Weight: 107 kg (16 st 12 lb)

Playing information
- Position: Prop
Club
Years	Team	Pld	T	G	FG	P
2018	Cronulla Sharks	4	0	0	0	0
2020	South Sydney	1	0	0	0	0
2023–	Lézignan Sangliers	3	2	0	0	0
	Total	8	2	0	0	0
Representative
Years	Team	Pld	T	G	FG	P
2018	NSW Residents	1	0	0	0	0
- Source: As of 10 January 2024

Kurt Dillon (born 8 August 1994) is an Australian professional rugby league footballer who plays as a prop for the Lézignan Sangliers in the Elite One Championship.

He previously played for the Cronulla-Sutherland Sharks and South Sydney Rabbitohs in the National Rugby League (NRL).

== Background ==
Dillon was born in Sydney, New South Wales, Australia. He was educated at Endeavour Sports High School, Caringbah and his junior club was De La Salle Caringbah. Dillon is the son of former 1st grader Geoff Dillon.

== Playing career ==
=== 2017 ===
Dillon won the Newtown Jets player of the year in 2017.

=== 2018 ===
He was named to make his Cronulla-Sutherland debut for their round 6 local derby match against the St George Illawarra Dragons. On 5 September 2018, the South Sydney club announced the signing of Dillon for the 2019 and 2020 seasons.

Dillon played for Cronulla's feeder club side Newtown in the 2018 Intrust Super Premiership NSW grand final against Canterbury-Bankstown at Leichhardt Oval which Newtown lost 18-12.

=== 2019 ===
Dillon made no appearances for the South Sydney first grade team in 2019 but played for the club's reserve grade side in the Canterbury Cup NSW. Dillon played in South Sydney's preliminary final defeat against Wentworthville.

=== 2020 ===
Dillon made his debut for South Sydney in round 15 of the 2020 NRL season against Manly-Warringah in which Souths won the match 56-16 at ANZ Stadium.

On 9 November, Dillon was released by South Sydney.

=== 2021 ===
In 2021, Dillon signed a contract to play for the Parramatta Eels NSW Cup team.

=== 2022 ===
In 2022, Dillon re-joined NSW Cup side Newtown.
