= 2019 NSW Cup season =

2019 Canterbury Cup
- Duration: March 15 – September 29, 2019
- Teams: 12
- Premiers: Newtown Jets
- Minor premiers: St George Illawarra Dragons
- Points scored: 6,336
- Top points scorer(s): Mawene Hiroti (208)
- Top try-scorer(s): Mawene Hiroti (17)

The 2019 Canterbury Cup NSW season was the eleventh season of the New South Wales Cup, the top rugby league competition administered by the New South Wales Rugby League. The competition acts as a second-tier league to the ten New South Wales-based National Rugby League clubs, as well the Canberra Raiders and New Zealand Warriors. The Newtown Jets won the premiership and played against Burleigh Bears, who won the 2019 Intrust Super Cup, in the NRL State Championship.

== Teams ==
In 2019, 12 clubs fielded teams in the Canterbury Cup. The South Sydney Rabbitohs will enter their own team, and the North Sydney Bears will become the reigning premiers Sydney Roosters' new feeder club.

The Jersey Flegg Cup competition will be run in parallel to the New South Wales Cup.

Colours	Team	Home Ground(s)	Head Coach(s)	NRL Feeder Club
	Blacktown Workers Sea Eagles	Brookvale Oval H.E. Laybutt Sports Complex		Manly-Warringah Sea Eagles
	Canterbury-Bankstown Bulldogs	Belmore Sports Ground		Canterbury-Bankstown Bulldogs
	Mount Pritchard Mounties	Aubrey Keech Reserve & GIO Stadium		Canberra Raiders
	New Zealand Warriors	Mount Smart Stadium		New Zealand Warriors
	Newcastle Knights	McDonald Jones Stadium		Newcastle Knights
	Newtown Jets	Henson Park Shark Park		Cronulla-Sutherland Sharks
	North Sydney Bears	North Sydney Oval		Sydney Roosters
	Penrith Panthers	Panthers Stadium		Penrith Panthers
	South Sydney Rabbitohs	ANZ Stadium Redfern Oval	Shane Millard	South Sydney Rabbitohs
	St George Illawarra Dragons	WIN Stadium Jubilee Oval	Mathew Head	St George Illawarra Dragons
	Wentworthville Magpies	Ringrose Park Western Sydney Stadium		Parramatta Eels
	Western Suburbs Magpies	Campbelltown Stadium Leichhardt Oval		Wests Tigers

== Ladder ==
2019 Canterbury Cup NSW
Pos	Team	Pld	W	D	L	B	PF	PA	PD	Pts
1	St George Illawarra Dragons	22	13	3	6	1	588	421	+167	31
2	South Sydney Rabbitohs	22	14	0	8	1	542	462	+80	30
3	North Sydney Bears	22	13	0	9	1	508	451	+57	28
4	Canterbury-Bankstown Bulldogs	22	12	1	9	1	501	500	+1	27
5	Penrith Panthers	22	12	0	10	1	494	474	+20	26
6	Mount Pritchard Mounties	22	11	1	10	1	584	515	+69	25
7	Newtown Jets (P)	22	11	1	10	1	536	536	0	25
8	Wentworthville Magpies	22	11	0	11	1	494	485	9	24
9	New Zealand Warriors	22	9	2	11	1	416	451	−35	22
10	Western Suburbs Magpies	22	7	3	12	1	447	502	−55	19
11	Newcastle Knights	22	7	0	15	1	336	494	−158	16
12	Blacktown Workers Sea Eagles	22	6	1	15	1	460	615	−155	15

== Finals Series ==
Home	Score	Away	Match Information			
Home	Score	Away	Date and Time	Venue	Referee(s)	Crowd
QUALIFYING AND ELIMINATION FINALS
Penrith Panthers	16 – 34	Wentworthville Magpies	Saturday 7 September	Campbelltown Stadium		1,000
Mount Pritchard Mounties	20 – 44	Newtown Jets	Saturday 7 September	Campbelltown Stadium		1,000
St George Illawarra Dragons	24 – 22	Canterbury-Bankstown Bulldogs	Sunday 8 September	Campbelltown Stadium		1,000
South Sydney Rabbitohs	32 – 12	North Sydney Bears	Sunday 8 September	Campbelltown Stadium		1,000
SEMI-FINALS
Canterbury-Bankstown Bulldogs	20 – 26	Wentworthville Magpies	Saturday 14 September	Leichhardt Oval		1,000
North Sydney Bears	28 – 30	Newtown Jets	Sunday 15 September	Leichhardt Oval		2,000
PRELIMINARY FINALS
South Sydney Rabbitohs	10 – 35	Wentworthville Magpies	Saturday 21 September	Netstrata Jubilee Stadium		1,000
St George Illawarra Dragons	20 – 22	Newtown Jets	Sunday 22 September	Netstrata Jubilee Stadium		3,000
GRAND FINAL
Newtown Jets	20 – 15	Wentworthville Magpies	Sunday 29 September	Bankwest Stadium		5,700

== NRL State Championship ==
As premiers of the NSW Cup, the Newtown Jets faced Queensland Cup premiers Burleigh Bears in the NRL State Championship match.

2019 NRL State Championship

Sunday, 6 October
13:35 AEDT (UTC+11)

Newtown Jets	20 – 16	Burleigh Bears
Tries: 4 Katoa 54', 76'; Ferris 63', 80'; Goals: 2 Trindall pen 19' (1/4); Eastwood 80' (1/1); Sin bin: 1 Mulitalo (yellow card) 38' to 48'	1st: 2–10; 2nd: 18–6; Report	Tries: 3 Don 22', 30'; Fogarty 47'; Goals: 2 Fogarty 32', 48' (2/3)

ANZ Stadium, Sydney
Referees: Todd Smith, Tyson Brough
Player of the Match: Toby Rudolf (Newtown)

== Television Broadcast ==
Fox League and Channel 9 will continue their broadcast of the Canterbury Cup. Channel 9 will be moving their weekly game from Saturday to Sunday to move between their broadcast of the Sunday Footy Show and their Sunday Afternoon NRL Broadcast for the NSW market, whilst in QLD they will broadcast an Intrust Super Cup match.

== Radio Broadcast ==
The Canterbury Cup is presented every weekend on Steele Sports.
