= Corey Allan =

Australian rugby league footballer (born 1998)

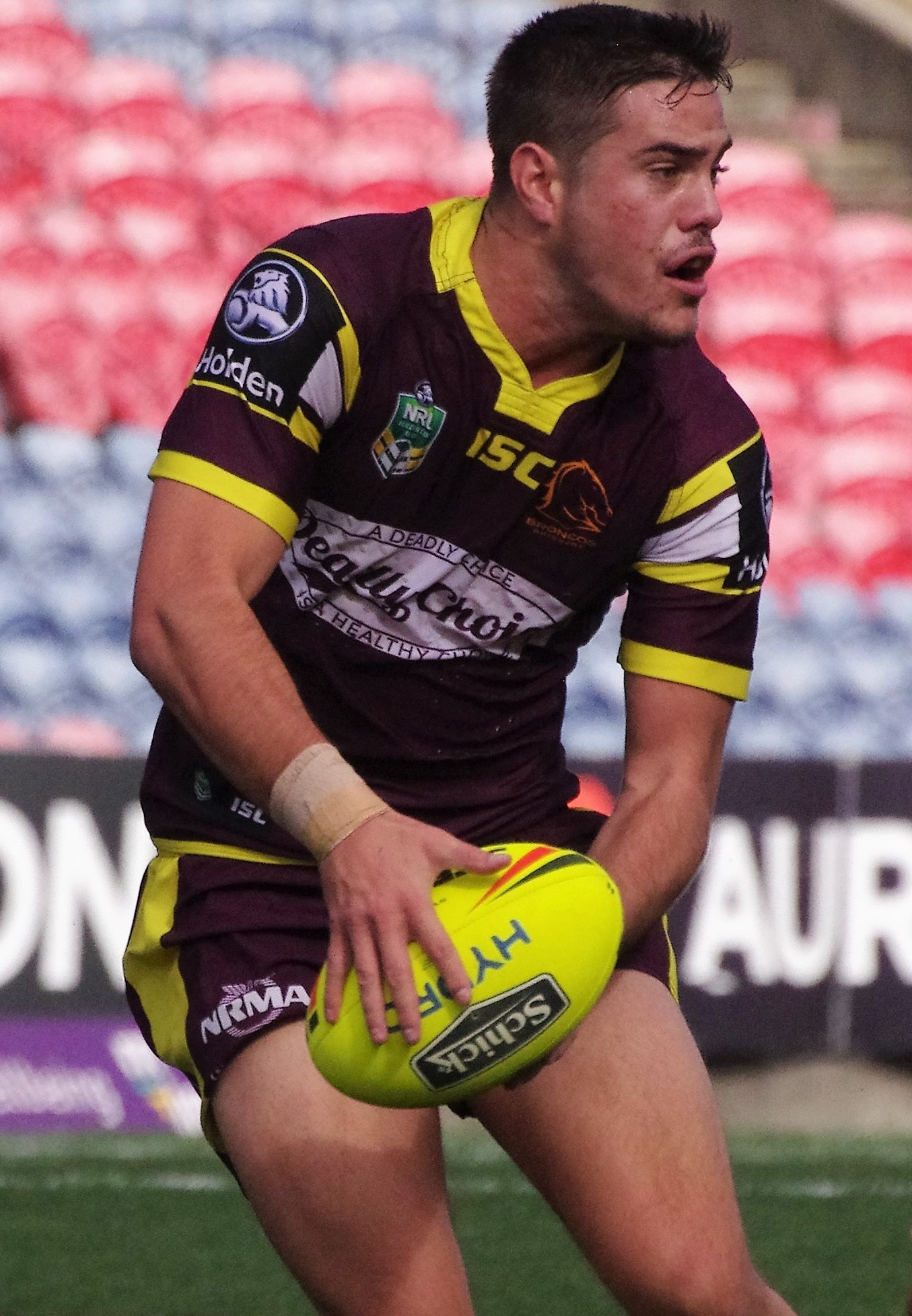

Personal information
- Born: 19 April 1998 (age 28) Brisbane, Queensland, Australia
- Height: 186 cm (6 ft 1 in)
- Weight: 94 kg (14 st 11 lb)

Playing information
- Position: Wing, Fullback, Centre
Club
| Years | Team | Pld | T | G | FG | P |
|---|---|---|---|---|---|---|
| 2019–20 | South Sydney | 29 | 8 | 0 | 0 | 32 |
| 2021–22 | Canterbury Bulldogs | 21 | 3 | 0 | 0 | 12 |
| 2023 | Sydney Roosters | 13 | 2 | 0 | 0 | 8 |
| 2025 | St. George Illawarra | 12 | 5 | 0 | 0 | 20 |
| | Total | 75 | 18 | 0 | 0 | 72 |
Representative
| Years | Team | Pld | T | G | FG | P |
| 2018 | Prime Minister's XIII | 1 | 1 | 0 | 0 | 4 |
| 2020 | Queensland | 1 | 0 | 0 | 0 | 0 |
- Source: As of 6 September 2025

Corey Allan (born 19 April 1998) is an Australian professional rugby league footballer who last played as a wing, fullback and centre for the St. George Illawarra Dragons in the National Rugby League.

He has previously played for the South Sydney Rabbitohs, Canterbury-Bankstown Bulldogs and Sydney Roosters in the NRL, and at representative level for the Prime Minister's XIII and the Queensland Maroons in State of Origin.

== Background ==
Allan was born in Brisbane, Queensland, Australia.

He played his junior rugby league for Logan Brothers Rugby League Football Club.

== Career ==
=== 2018 ===
In 2018, he represented the Australian Prime Minister's XIII against Papua New Guinea in Port Moresby.

=== 2019 ===
Allan made his first grade debut in Round 1 of the 2019 NRL season for South Sydney against the Sydney Roosters at the Sydney Cricket Ground. Two weeks later in Round 3, Allan scored his first try in the top grade as Souths defeated the Gold Coast 28–20 at ANZ Stadium.

Allan made a total of 19 appearances in the 2019 NRL season as South Sydney reached the preliminary final before being defeated by the Canberra Raiders 16–10 at Canberra Stadium. Allan made a crucial error during the first half of the game when he lost the ball on his own goal line which enabled Canberra player Jarrod Croker to score a try.

=== 2020 ===
Allan made his first start of the 2020 NRL season in round 10 against Newcastle as Souths lost the match 20–18 at Bankwest Stadium.

In round 16 of the 2020 NRL season, Allan scored his first try of the year as Souths defeated Parramatta 38–0 at Bankwest Stadium.

In round 20 of the 2020 NRL season, Allan scored a try in South Sydney's victory over bitter rivals the Sydney Roosters. In the second half, Allan had crossed over for what would have been his second try but instead passed the ball to teammate Alex Johnston despite standing in the oppositions in-goal area.

Allan played a total of 10 games for South Sydney in the 2020 NRL season scoring five tries. He played in all three of South Sydney's 2020 finals matches including their preliminary final loss to Penrith.

Allan was selected by Queensland for the 2020 State of Origin series. He made his debut for Queensland in Game 3 where he was sent to the sin bin for a professional foul on New South Wales player Josh Addo-Carr in the dying minutes, denying a possible try-scoring effort. Subsequently, Queensland stunned New South Wales to win the series 2–1.

=== 2021 ===
On 11 January 2021, it was announced that he had signed a three-year deal with the Canterbury-Bankstown Bulldogs starting in 2021.

In round 1 of the 2021 NRL season, he made his debut for Canterbury-Bankstown in a 32–16 loss against Newcastle. Allan made a total of 18 appearances for Canterbury in the 2021 NRL season as the club finished last and claimed the Wooden Spoon.

=== 2022 ===
After a frustrating run of injury, Allan fought his way back into the Canterbury first grade side midway through the 2022 NRL season, returning against the defending premiers Penrith Panthers and also featuring in wins Parramatta and Wests Tigers.

On 8 December 2022, Allan was released by Canterbury with a year remaining on his contract. The following day, Allan signed a contract to join the Sydney Roosters for the 2023 season.

=== 2023 ===
Allan played a total of 13 matches for the Sydney Roosters in the 2023 NRL season. Allan played in the clubs elimination finals loss against Melbourne which ended their season. In November, Allan was released by the club. On 12 December, Allan signed a one-year deal to join St. George Illawarra ahead of the 2024 NRL season.

=== 2024 ===
On 11 January, it was announced that Allan would miss the entire 2024 NRL season after suffering an ACL injury at training.

=== 2025 ===
In round 9 of the 2025 NRL season, Allan played his first game in the top grade for almost two years as St. George Illawarra lost 34-28 against the Wests Tigers. Allan played a total of 12 games for the club throughout the season as St. George Illawarra finished 15th on the table. Allan was one of twelve players released by the club at the end of their season. On 31 December 2025, Allan officially announced his retirement from professional rugby league.

== Statistics ==
| Year | Team | Games | Tries | Pts |
|---|---|---|---|---|
| 2019 | South Sydney Rabbitohs | 19 | 3 | 12 |
| 2020 | South Sydney Rabbitohs | 10 | 5 | 20 |
| 2021 | Canterbury-Bankstown Bulldogs | 18 | 3 | 12 |
| 2022 | Canterbury-Bankstown Bulldogs | 3 | | |
| 2023 | Sydney Roosters | 13 | 2 | 8 |
| 2025 | St. George Illawarra Dragons | 12 | 5 | 20 |
| | Totals | 75 | 18 | 72 |
