= Bayley Sironen =

Australian rugby league footballer

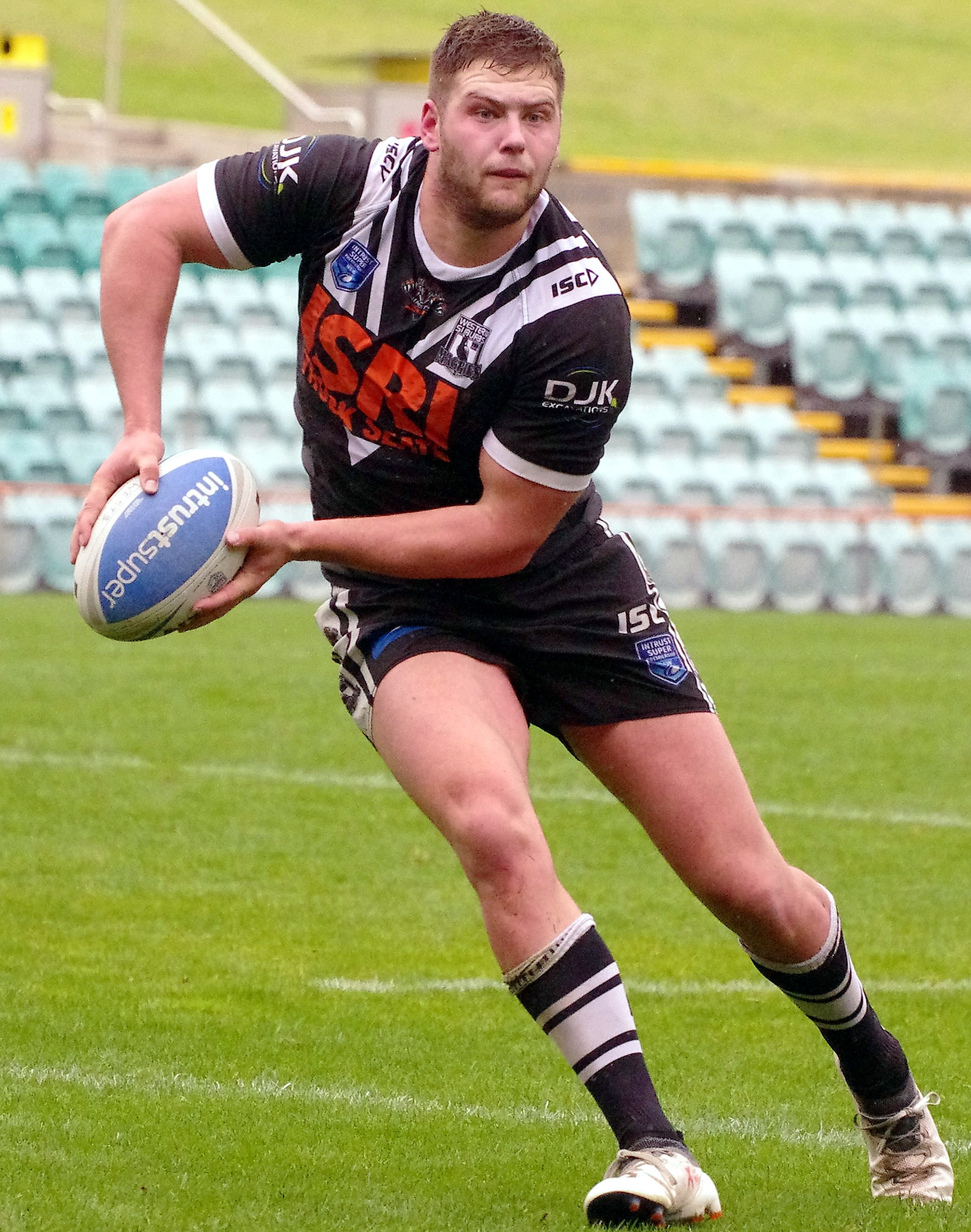

Personal information
- Born: 23 December 1996 (age 29) Sydney, Australia
- Height: 186 cm (6 ft 1 in)
- Weight: 101 kg (15 st 13 lb)

Playing information
- Position: Second-row, Hooker, Lock
Club
Years	Team	Pld	T	G	FG	P
2017–18	Wests Tigers	5	0	0	0	0
2019–20	South Sydney	22	2	0	0	8
2021–23	New Zealand Warriors	55	4	0	0	16
2024–25	Catalans Dragons	45	5	0	0	20
2026–	Wynnum Manly Seagulls	0	0	0	0	0
	Total	127	11	0	0	44
Representative
Years	Team	Pld	T	G	FG	P
2018	NSW Residents	1	0	0	0	0
- Source: As of 22 November 2026
- Father: Paul Sironen
- Relatives: Curtis Sironen (brother)

Bayley Sironen (born 23 December 1996) is an Australian professional rugby league footballer who plays as a second-row, hooker, and lock for Wynnum Manly Seagulls in the Queensland Cup.

He previously played for the Wests Tigers, South Sydney Rabbitohs and New Zealand Warriors in the National Rugby League.

== Background ==
Sironen was born in Sydney, New South Wales, Australia. He is the younger brother of St Helens player Curtis Sironen, and son of Australian international Paul Sironen.

Sironen played his junior rugby league for the Holy Cross Rhinos, before being signed by the Wests Tigers.

== Playing career ==
=== Early career ===
In July 2014, Sironen was named in the Australian Schoolboys rugby league squad. In 2015 and 2016, he played for the Wests Tigers' NYC team. In July 2016, he played for the New South Wales under-20s team against the Queensland under-20s team.

=== 2017 ===
In 2017, Sironen graduated to the Tigers' Intrust Super Premiership NSW team. In round 25 of the 2017 NRL season, he made his NRL debut for the Tigers against the North Queensland Cowboys. He was contracted to the Tigers until the end of 2018.

=== 2018 ===
In 2018, Sironen was selected to play for the New South Wales Residents against the Queensland Residents side. On September 5, Sironen signed a one-year deal to join South Sydney for the 2019 season after failing to secure a first grade spot with Wests.

=== 2019 ===
Sironen made his debut for an Origin depleted South Sydney side (first grade player #1151) in round 12 of the 2019 NRL season against Parramatta which ended in a 14–26 defeat at the new Western Sydney Stadium.

=== 2020 ===
In round 7 of the 2020 NRL season, Sironen scored his first try in the top grade as South Sydney were defeated by Penrith 20–12 at Bankwest Stadium.

Sironen played 19 games throughout the season including South Sydney's preliminary final defeat against Penrith.

On 20 November, he signed a three-year contract with New Zealand.

=== 2021 ===
In round 1 of the 2021 NRL season, he scored a try on debut for New Zealand in a 19–6 victory over the Gold Coast. Sironen played 19 games for New Zealand in the 2021 NRL season where the club finished 12th on the table and missed the finals.

=== 2022 ===
Sironen made a total of 13 appearances for the New Zealand Warriors in the 2022 NRL season as they finished 15th on the table.

=== 2023 ===
On 5 October 2023, it was reported that he had signed with the Catalans Dragons ahead of the 2024 season on a two-year deal.

=== 2026 ===
On 18 February 2026 it was reported that he had signed for Wynnum Manly Seagulls in the Queensland Cup

== Statistics ==
Season	Team	Played	Tries	Pts
2017	Wests Tigers	2		
2019	South Sydney Rabbitohs	3		
2020	South Sydney Rabbitohs	19	2	8
2021	Warriors	19	2	8
2022	Warriors	13		
2023	Warriors	25	2	8
2024	Catalans Dragons	22	3	12
2025	Catalans Dragons	23	2	8
2026*	Wynnum Manly Seagulls	0	0	0
	Totals	127	11	44

*denotes season competing
