= 2020 Brisbane Broncos season =

- NRL rank: 16th (Wooden spoon)
- 2020 record: Wins: 3; losses: 17
- Points scored: For: 268; against: 624

Team information
- CEO: Paul White
- Coach: Anthony Seibold (Rounds 1-13); Peter Gentle (Rounds 14-20)
- Captain: Alex Glenn Patrick Carrigan Brodie Croft
- Stadium: Suncorp Stadium
- Avg. attendance: 8,624
- Agg. attendance: 60,370
- High attendance: 17,174 (North Queensland Cowboys, 24 September)
- Low attendance: 5,626 (Penrith Panthers, 3 September)

Top scorers
- Tries: Kotoni Staggs (10)
- Goals: Kotoni Staggs (18)
- Points: Kotoni Staggs (76)
← 2019	List of seasons	2021 →

The 2020 Brisbane Broncos season was the 33rd in the club's history. Coached by Peter Gentle, following the resignation of Anthony Seibold, and captained by Alex Glenn, they competed in the NRL's 2020 Telstra Premiership. The Broncos failed to qualify for the finals for the first time since 2013 and claimed their first ever wooden spoon in a disastrous season, marred by controversy, the COVID-19 pandemic and injuries to key players.

== Season summary ==
Before the season had launched for the Broncos, the team already faced controversy after forward Joe Ofahengaue was issued a traffic infringement by Queensland police for being asleep in a stationary vehicle.

The Broncos competed in Pool 4 in the Nines, with club legend Corey Parker coming out of retirement to join the team for the pre-season competition. The Broncos started off their Nines campaign, losing to the North Queensland Cowboys 17–11, and defeated the Melbourne Storm 12-8 the following day. The Manly Warringah Sea Eagles had a better for and against than the Broncos and clinched the second finals spot in the pool, meaning that the Broncos missed out on qualifying for the finals of the Nines.

Two days after the end of the Nines competition, outside back Izaia Perese was stood down from all club duties by the Broncos, after he was charged by police with drug related offences. It had later come to light that Perese was flown to Perth for the Nines competition, and was sent home the day before the tournament commenced once the club was informed of his legal issues.

The Broncos had a shaky performance during the pre-season trials, beating the Central Queensland Capras convincingly, while losing close games against the Cowboys, Titans and Wynnum Manly. Injuries sidelined captain Alex Glenn, Matt Lodge and Joe Ofahengaue for the opening round, with Anthony Seibold choosing young forward Patrick Carrigan and new recruit Brodie Croft as co-captains against the Cowboys. The Broncos defeated the Cowboys 28–21. As the COVID-19 pandemic worsened in Australia, the NRL announced that Round 2 would be played behind closed doors, but conceded that they were unsure whether the competition could continue beyond that. Playing in an empty Suncorp Stadium, the Broncos defeated the South Sydney Rabbitohs 22–18. On March 18, the Australian government declared a human biosecurity emergency due to the COVID-19 pandemic, which put the NRL season in jeopardy. Two days later on March 20, the NRL announced it would be suspending the season. The Broncos sat at sixth position on the ladder before the suspension of the competition.

After speculation about when or if the competition would resume, the NRL announced its intentions to restart the competition on May 28, with the relaunch being dubbed "Project Apollo". The draw was revised to fall in line with federal and state restrictions, with the NRL eventually releasing a 20-round draw, where each team would play each other once and play five teams a second time. Players were also required to regularly test for COVID-19 and provide the NRL with details about their own wellbeing, as well as the wellbeing of others in their household. Numerous rule changes were also put in place by the NRL, with the most significant being the introduction of the "six again" or "six-to-go" rule, where the tackle count would reset for ruck infringements, rather than the affected team receiving a penalty.

Prior to the relaunch of the NRL season, veteran hooker Andrew McCullough was released by the Broncos and signed with the Newcastle Knights for the rest of the season. The short term deal also included a clause that allowed McCullough to return to the Broncos for the 2021 season.

The Broncos opened the relaunch of the NRL season, playing against the Parramatta Eels in an empty Suncorp Stadium. The team trailed 12-6 at halftime, but came up short after conceding four tries in the second half to go down 34-6. Any optimism at the Broncos was quickly fizzled out the following week, with the injury-hit team suffering their heaviest defeat in history, losing 59-0 to the Sydney Roosters, who were without fullback James Tedesco after a high body temperature prevented him from flying up for the game. This marked the first time in club history that the Broncos were held scoreless at Suncorp Stadium. The lack of effort from the Broncos was noted by Andrew Johns and Paul Vautin, who called the Broncos "soft" and "diabolical". Broncos players refused to report to the post-match press conference after the loss, despite being obligated by the NRL to attend.

The following week, the Broncos looked to bounce back against the Manly-Warringah Sea Eagles in a limited capacity crowd at Central Coast Stadium. Brisbane got off to a good start, leading 18-0 after the first 30 minutes of the game. However, a try that would've put Brisbane up 24-0 was controversially disallowed when it was deemed that the Manly defenders were obstructed. The disallowed try appeared to change the momentum of the game, as Manly piled on 20 unanswered points to come back and defeat Brisbane. Ben Te'o also made his return to the club, playing his first game for the Broncos since 2012, and his first NRL game since the 2014 grand final.

With starting hooker Jake Turpin injured and the Broncos releasing Andrew McCullough before the season restarted, former Kiwis hooker Issac Luke joined the club mid-season from the St. George Illawarra Dragons and made his club debut in Brisbane's 27-6 defeat against the Knights. The club's decision to recruit Te'o and Luke drew criticism.

The Broncos' Round 7 clash against the Gold Coast Titans was clouded with negativity, with the home crowd booing Brisbane off the field at half-time, where the Broncos were down 22-0. Media pundits and fans also took aim at the Broncos players for laughing and socialising with Titans players after the game had ended, with the Broncos going down 30-12.

Brisbane's woes continued, picking up their sixth straight loss against the New Zealand Warriors after leading 10-0 at one stage, before conceding a 26-16 defeat. Broncos players, such as Alex Glenn and Brodie Croft, were pictured crying after the loss and being consoled by sympathetic Warriors players. Media pundits were skeptical of the legitimacy of the emotional out-pour from Broncos players, as they had faced backlash the prior week for laughing with Titans players at full time.

== Squad information ==
As of Round 20

Cap.	Nat.	Player	Position	Broncos debut	Previous First Grade RL club
141	(Australia)	Darius Boyd	Centre	2006	(Australia) Newcastle Knights
171	(Samoa)	Ben Te'o	Second-row	2009	(Australia) South Sydney Rabbitohs
172	(Cook Islands)	Alex Glenn (c)	Second-row	2009	—N/a
199	(New Zealand)	Jordan Kahu	Centre	2013	(Australia) North Queensland Cowboys
201	(Australia)	Corey Oates	Wing	2013	—N/a
209	(Samoa)	Anthony Milford	Five-eighth	2015	(Australia) Canberra Raiders
212	(Tonga)	Joe Ofahengaue	Prop	2015	—N/a
224	(Tonga)	Tevita Pangai Junior	Second-row	2016	—N/a
232	(New Zealand)	Jamayne Isaako	Fullback	2017	—N/a
233	(Australia)	Matthew Lodge	Prop	2018	(Australia) Wests Tigers
234	(Australia)	Jack Bird	Fullback	2018	(Australia) Cronulla-Sutherland Sharks
236	(Australia)	Payne Haas	Prop	2018	—N/a
238	(Tonga)	Kotoni Staggs	Centre	2018	—N/a
239	(Australia)	David Fifita	Second-row	2018	—N/a
240	(Australia)	Jake Turpin	Hooker	2018	—N/a
242	(Australia)	Thomas Flegler	Prop	2019	—N/a
244	(Australia)	Patrick Carrigan	Lock	2019	—N/a
245	(Australia)	Tom Dearden	Halfback	2019	—N/a
247	(Samoa)	Richard Kennar	Wing	2019	(Australia) South Sydney Rabbitohs
248	(Australia)	Sean O'Sullivan	Five-eighth	2019	(Australia) Sydney Roosters
249	(England)	Herbie Farnworth	Centre	2019	—N/a
250	(Papua New Guinea)	Xavier Coates	Wing	2019	—N/a
251	(Samoa)	Keenan Palasia	Prop	2019	—N/a
252	(Australia)	Rhys Kennedy	Prop	2019	(Australia) South Sydney Rabbitohs
254	(New Zealand)	Jesse Arthars	Wing	2020	(Australia) Gold Coast Titans
255	(Australia)	Brodie Croft	Halfback	2020	(Australia) Melbourne Storm
256	(Tonga)	Jamil Hopoate	Second-row	2020	—N/a
257	(Australia)	Ethan Bullemor	Second-row	2020	—N/a
258	(Tonga)	Tesi Niu	Fullback	2020	—N/a
259	(Australia)	Cory Paix	Hooker	2020	—N/a
260	(New Zealand)	Issac Luke	Hooker	2020	(Australia) St. George Illawarra Dragons
261	(Australia)	Tyson Gamble	Five-eighth	2020	(Australia) Wests Tigers
262	(New Zealand)	Jordan Riki	Second-row	2020	—N/a
–	(Fiji)	Ilikena Vudogo	Centre	Yet to debut	—N/a
–	(Cook Islands)	Pride Petterson-Robati	Prop	Yet to debut	—N/a

== Squad changes ==
=== Transfers in ===
Date	Position	Player	From	Year/s	Ref.
10 July 2019	Wing	Jesse Arthars	Gold Coast Titans	2 Years	
1 November 2019	Centre	Jordan Kahu	North Queensland Cowboys	1 Year	
26 November 2019	Halfback	Brodie Croft	Melbourne Storm	3 Years	
4 June 2020	Second-row	Ben Te'o	Sunwolves	End of season	
13 June 2020	Hooker	Issac Luke	St. George Illawarra Dragons	End of season	

=== Transfers out ===
Date	Position	Player	To	Year/s	Ref.
15 August 2019	Five-eighth	Troy Dargan	South Sydney Rabbitohs	2 Years	
5 October 2019	Prop	Shaun Fensom	Retirement	—N/a	
5 October 2019	Prop	Sam Tagataese	Retirement	—N/a	
31 October 2019	Second-row	Matt Gillett	Retirement	—N/a	
6 November 2019	Prop	George Fai	Northern Pride		
6 November 2019	Prop	Patrick Mago	South Sydney Rabbitohs	Train & Trial	
6 November 2019	Hooker	James Segeyaro	Released	—N/a	
5 December 2019	Centre	Gehamat Shibasaki	Newcastle Knights	3 Years	
17 February 2020	Centre	Izaia Perese	Released	—N/a	
21 May 2020	Hooker	Andrew McCullough	Newcastle Knights	End of season	

== Coaching staff ==
Name	Position	Ref.
Peter Gentle	Head coach (interim)	
Peter Ryan	Defence Coach	
Kurt Richards	Assistant	
Paul Devlin	Head of Performance	
Andrew Croll	Conditioning Coach	
Peter Nolan	General Manager - Football Operations	

- Anthony Seibold was sacked as Head coach, with Peter Gentle filling the role on an interim basis
- Defence coach Ben Cross was made redundant due to the financial impacts of COVID-19 on the club
- Forwards coach Corey Parker was unable to join the bubble due to Fox League commitments.

== Pre-season ==
=== Perth Nines ===
==== Squad ====
No.	Player	Broncos Nines debut	Previous Nines NRL club
1	Jamayne Isaako	2018	—N/a
2	Herbie Farnworth	2020	—N/a
4	Jesse Arthars	2020	—N/a
5	Kotoni Staggs	2020	—N/a
6	Anthony Milford	2015	—N/a
7	Brodie Croft (c)	2020	Melbourne Storm
8	Thomas Flegler	2020	—N/a
9	Jake Turpin	2020	Melbourne Storm
10	Payne Haas	2020	—N/a
12	David Fifita	2020	—N/a
13	Ethan Bullemor	2020	—N/a
14	Tom Dearden	2020	—N/a
15	Cory Paix	2020	—N/a
16	Tesi Niu	2020	—N/a
17	Ilikena Vudogo	2020	—N/a
18	Corey Parker	2014	—N/a

- Assistant coach Kurt Richards coached the side for the tournament.
- 2006 Premiership-winner Corey Parker came out of retirement for the tournament.
- Captain Alex Glenn and Xavier Coates were originally named but withdrew prior to the tournament due to hamstring tightness.
- Izaia Perese was originally named but was stood down by the Broncos prior to the tournament.

==== Matches ====
Date	Rd	Opponent	Venue	Result	BRI	OPP	Tries	Conversions
14 Feb	1	North Queensland Cowboys	HBF Park	Lost	11	17	Turpin, Arthars	Isaako (1/2)
15 Feb	2	Melbourne Storm	HBF Park	Won	12	8	Isaako, Staggs	Isaako (2/2)

==== Pool ladder ====
Pool 4 Standings
Team	Pld	W	D	L	PF	PA	PD	Pts
North Queensland Cowboys	2	2	0	0	27	18	+9	4
Manly Warringah Sea Eagles	2	1	0	1	25	14	+11	2
Brisbane Broncos	2	1	0	1	23	25	−2	2
Melbourne Storm	2	0	0	2	12	30	−18	0

Source: 2020 NRL Nines Standings

=== Trial matches ===
Date	Rd	Opponent	H/A	Venue	Result	BRI	OPP	Tries	Goals	FG	Ref
15 Feb	1	Central Queensland Capras	H	Browne Park	Won	36	18			–	
21 Feb	2	Wynnum-Manly Seagulls	A	Kitchener Park	Lost	12	16			–	
22 Feb	2	North Queensland Cowboys	A	Barlow Park	Lost	16	18	Arthars (2), Milford	Staggs (1/2), Isaako (1/1)	–	
29 Feb	3	Gold Coast Titans	H	Dolphin Stadium	Lost	22	28	Coates, Turpin, Flegler, Farnworth	Staggs (2/3), Isaako (1/1)	–	

- Forwards coach Corey Parker took the coaching reigns for the trial match against Wynnum-Manly.

== Regular season ==
As of Round 20

=== Result by round ===
Round	1	2	3	4	5	6	7	8	9	10	11	12	13	14	15	16	17	18	19	20
Ground	A	H	H	H	A	A	H	A	H	A	H	H	A	A	H	A	H	A	A	H
Result	W	W	L	L	L	L	L	L	W	L	L	L	L	L	L	L	L	L	L	L
Position	5	5	9	10	12	14	15	14	14	14	15	15	15	15	15	15	15	15	16	16
Points	2	4	4	4	4	4	4	4	6	6	6	6	6	6	6	6	6	6	6	6

Source: National Rugby League
A = Away; H = Home; N = Neutral; B = Bye; W = Win; D = Draw; L = Loss

=== Matches ===
As of Round 20

Date	Rd	Opponent	H/A	Venue	Result	BRI	OPP	Tries	Goals	Field Goals	Ref
13 Mar	1	North Queensland Cowboys	A	Queensland Country Bank Stadium	Won	28	21	Turpin, Staggs, Pangai Junior, Fifita, Isaako	Isaako (4/5)	–	
20 Mar	2	South Sydney Rabbitohs	H	Suncorp Stadium	Won	22	18	Staggs (3), Milford	Isaako (3/5)	–	
28 May	3	Parramatta Eels	H	Suncorp Stadium	Lost	6	34	Croft	Isaako (1/1)	–	
4 Jun	4	Sydney Roosters	H	Suncorp Stadium	Lost	0	59	–	–	–	
11 Jun	5	Manly Warringah Sea Eagles	A	Central Coast Stadium	Lost	18	20	Staggs, Coates, Boyd	Isaako (3/3)	–	
18 Jun	6	Newcastle Knights	A	Central Coast Stadium	Lost	6	27	Coates	Farnworth (1/1)	–	
27 Jun	7	Gold Coast Titans	H	Suncorp Stadium	Lost	12	30	Te'o, Farnworth	Farnworth (2/2)	–	
4 Jul	8	New Zealand Warriors	A	Central Coast Stadium	Lost	16	26	Coates (2), Farnworth	Isaako (2/3)	–	
11 Jul	9	Canterbury-Bankstown Bulldogs	H	Suncorp Stadium	Won	26	8	Isaako (2), Oates, Pangai Junior, Coates	Isaako (3/6)	–	
17 Jul	10	Wests Tigers	A	Leichhardt Oval	Lost	0	48	–	–	–	
24 Jul	11	Melbourne Storm	H	Suncorp Stadium	Lost	8	46	Farnworth	Staggs (2/2)	–	
31 Jul	12	Cronulla-Sutherland Sharks	H	Suncorp Stadium	Lost	26	36	Staggs (2), Kennar (2), Rhys Kennedy	Staggs (3/5)	–	
7 Aug	13	South Sydney Rabbitohs	A	ANZ Stadium	Lost	10	28	Farnworth, Fifita	Staggs (1/2)	–	
15 Aug	14	Canberra Raiders	A	GIO Stadium	Lost	8	36	Arthars, Farnworth,	Staggs (0/2)	–	
21 Aug	15	St. George Illawarra Dragons	H	Suncorp Stadium	Lost	24	28	Kennar, Paix, Staggs, Dearden	Staggs (4/4)	–	
28 Aug	16	Sydney Roosters	A	Sydney Cricket Ground	Lost	12	58	Staggs, Fifita	Staggs (2/2)	–	
3 Sep	17	Penrith Panthers	H	Suncorp Stadium	Lost	12	25	Staggs, Riki	Staggs (2/2)	–	
12 Sep	18	Gold Coast Titans	A	Cbus Super Stadium	Lost	6	18	Boyd	Staggs (1/1)	–	
18 Sep	19	Parramatta Eels	A	Western Sydney Stadium	Lost	12	26	Fifita, Farnworth	Staggs (2/2)	–	
24 Sep	20	North Queensland Cowboys	H	Suncorp Stadium	Lost	16	32	Haas, Boyd, Oates	Staggs (1/1), Luke (1/2)	–	

==== Original regular season fixture ====
This was the original fixture for the Brisbane Broncos prior to the COVID-19 pandemic causing the season to be altered and rescheduled.

Date	Rd	Opponent	H/A	Venue
13 Mar	1	North Queensland Cowboys	A	Queensland Country Bank Stadium
20 Mar	2	South Sydney Rabbitohs	H	Suncorp Stadium
29 Mar	3	Gold Coast Titans	A	Cbus Super Stadium
4 Apr	4	Penrith Panthers	A	Penrith Stadium
10 Apr	5	North Queensland Cowboys	H	Suncorp Stadium
17 Apr	6	Cronulla-Sutherland Sharks	H	Suncorp Stadium
24 Apr	7	Parramatta Eels	A	TIO Stadium
1 May	8	Manly Warringah Sea Eagles	A	Suncorp Stadium
7 May	9	South Sydney Rabbitohs	A	ANZ Stadium
15 May	10	St. George Illawarra Dragons	H	Suncorp Stadium
21 May	11	Canterbury-Bankstown Bulldogs	H	Suncorp Stadium
	12	Bye		
5 Jun	13	New Zealand Warriors	A	Mt Smart Stadium
11 Jun	14	Sydney Roosters	A	Sydney Cricket Ground
26 Jun	15	Melbourne Storm	H	Suncorp Stadium
2 Jul	16	Penrith Panthers	H	Suncorp Stadium
11 Jul	17	Canberra Raiders	A	GIO Stadium
19 Jul	18	Newcastle Knights	A	McDonald Jones Stadium
25 Jul	19	New Zealand Warriors	H	Suncorp Stadium
31 Jul	20	Parramatta Eels	H	Suncorp Stadium
9 Aug	21	Wests Tigers	A	Campbelltown Stadium
16 Aug	22	Gold Coast Titans	H	Suncorp Stadium
22 Aug	23	Newcastle Knights	H	Suncorp Stadium
29 Aug	24	Melbourne Storm	A	AAMI Park
4 Sep	25	Sydney Roosters	H	Suncorp Stadium

=== Ladder ===
As of Round 20

Pos	Team	Pld	W	D	L	B	PF	PA	PD	Pts	
1	Penrith Panthers (M)	20	18	1	1	0	537	238	+299	37	Advance to finals series
2	Melbourne Storm (P)	20	16	0	4	0	534	276	+258	32	Advance to finals series
3	Parramatta Eels	20	15	0	5	0	392	288	+104	30	Advance to finals series
4	Sydney Roosters	20	14	0	6	0	552	322	+230	28	Advance to finals series
5	Canberra Raiders	20	14	0	6	0	445	317	+128	28	Advance to finals series
6	South Sydney Rabbitohs	20	12	0	8	0	521	352	+169	24	Advance to finals series
7	Newcastle Knights	20	11	1	8	0	421	374	+47	23	Advance to finals series
8	Cronulla-Sutherland Sharks	20	10	0	10	0	480	480	0	20	Advance to finals series
9	Gold Coast Titans	20	9	0	11	0	346	463	−117	18	
10	New Zealand Warriors	20	8	0	12	0	343	458	−115	16	
11	Wests Tigers	20	7	0	13	0	440	505	−65	14	
12	St. George Illawarra Dragons	20	7	0	13	0	378	452	−74	14	
13	Manly Warringah Sea Eagles	20	7	0	13	0	375	509	−134	14	
14	North Queensland Cowboys	20	5	0	15	0	368	520	−152	10	
15	Canterbury-Bankstown Bulldogs	20	3	0	17	0	282	504	−222	6	
16	Brisbane Broncos (W)	20	3	0	17	0	268	624	−356	6	

Updated to match(es) played on 27 September 2020. Source: 2020 NRL Ladder
(M) Minor premiers; (P) Premiers; (W) Wooden spoon

=== NRL Judiciary ===
As of Round 20

List of all charges from the NRL Judiciary.

Round	Player	Charge	Record	Plea	Result	Ref

=== Injuries ===
As of Round 20

List of all injuries sustained during the 2020 season.

Round	Player	Injury	Length	Status	Ref

== Milestone games ==
As of Round 20

Round	Player	Milestone
Round 1	Jesse Arthars	Broncos NRL Debut
Round 1	Brodie Croft	Broncos NRL Debut
Round 1	Jamil Hopoate	NRL Debut
Round 2	Jamayne Isaako	50 NRL Games
Round 2	Ethan Bullemor	NRL Debut
Round 3	Brodie Croft	1st Broncos NRL Try
Round 4	Cory Paix	NRL Debut
Round 4	Tesi Niu	NRL Debut
Round 5	Matthew Lodge	50 Broncos NRL Games
Round 6	Issac Luke	Broncos NRL Debut
Round 6	Herbie Farnworth	1st NRL Goal
Round 7	Herbie Farnworth	1st NRL Try
Round 8	Corey Oates	150 NRL Games
Round 11	Brodie Croft	50 NRL Games
Round 11	Tyson Gamble	Broncos NRL Debut
Round 12	Rhys Kennedy	1st NRL Try
Round 12	Richard Kennar	1st Broncos NRL Try
Round 14	Jesse Arthars	1st Broncos NRL Try
Round 14	Joe Ofahengaue	100 NRL Games
Round 14	Jordan Riki	NRL Debut
Round 15	Darius Boyd	200 Broncos NRL Games
Round 15	Cory Paix	1st NRL Try
Round 15	Tom Dearden	1st NRL Try
Round 17	Jordan Riki	1st NRL Try
Round 20	Darius Boyd	Final NRL Game
Round 20	Issac Luke	1st Broncos NRL Goal

== Player statistics ==
As of Round 20

Players with no appearances are not included on the list.

Player	Games	Tries	Goals	Field goals	Points
Jesse Arthars	6	1	0	0	4
(Australia) Darius Boyd	20	3	0	0	12
Ethan Bullemor	8	0	0	0	0
Patrick Carrigan	19	0	0	0	0
(Papua New Guinea) Xavier Coates	12	5	0	0	20
Brodie Croft	14	1	0	0	4
Tom Dearden	12	1	0	0	4
Herbie Farnworth	19	6	3	0	30
David Fifita	9	4	0	0	16
Tyson Gamble	2	0	0	0	0
(New Zealand) (Cook Islands) Alex Glenn (c)	8	0	0	0	0
(Australia) Payne Haas	17	1	0	0	4
Jamil Hopoate	12	0	0	0	0
(New Zealand) (Samoa) Jamayne Isaako	10	3	16	0	44
(New Zealand) Jordan Kahu	2	0	0	0	0
Richard Kennar	10	3	0	0	12
Rhys Kennedy	13	1	0	0	4
Matthew Lodge	6	0	0	0	0
(New Zealand) Issac Luke	12	0	1	0	2
Andrew McCullough	2	0	0	0	0
(Samoa) Anthony Milford	13	1	0	0	4
Tesi Niu	6	0	0	0	0
Corey Oates	14	2	0	0	8
(Tonga) Joe Ofahengaue	15	0	0	0	0
Sean O'Sullivan	3	0	0	0	0
Cory Paix	13	1	0	0	4
(Tonga) Tevita Pangai Junior	9	2	0	0	8
Jordan Riki	5	1	0	0	4
(Tonga) Kotoni Staggs	14	10	18	0	76
(Samoa) Ben Te'o	16	1	0	0	4
Jake Turpin	6	1	0	0	4
32 players used	20	48	38	0	268

== Representative honours ==
This table lists all players who played a representative match in 2020.

Player	All Stars	State of Origin 1	State of Origin 2	State of Origin 3
Xavier Coates	—N/a	Queensland	Queensland	–
David Fifita	Indigenous	–	–	–
Payne Haas	—N/a	New South Wales	New South Wales	New South Wales
Jordan Riki	Māori	—N/a	—N/a	—N/a

== Awards ==
=== 2020 Dally M Awards ===
- Centre of the Year: Kotoni Staggs
- Try of the Year: Kotoni Staggs — Round 15 vs Dragons
- Female Player of the Year: Ali Brigginshaw

=== Broncos Awards Night ===
Held at Brisbane Convention & Exhibition Centre on Wednesday, 7 October 2020.

- Paul Morgan Medal (Player of the Year): Payne Haas & Patrick Carrigan
- Players' Player: Payne Haas & Patrick Carrigan
- Best Back: Kotoni Staggs
- Best Forward: Payne Haas
- Most Consistent: Patrick Carrigan
- Rookie of the Year: Herbie Farnworth
- Play of the Year: Kotoni Staggs – Round 15 vs Dragons, Kotoni Staggs try, 43rd minute
- Clubman of the Year: Gina Malcolm, Louise Lanigan & Kath Bennett

=== Rugby League Players’ Association Awards ===
- Centre of the Year: Kotoni Staggs
