= 2021 Brisbane Broncos season =

- NRL rank: 14th
- Play-off result: Did not qualify
- 2021 record: Wins: 7; losses: 17
- Points scored: For: 446; against: 695

Team information
- CEO: Dave Donaghy
- Coach: Kevin Walters
- Captain: Alex Glenn
- Stadium: Suncorp Stadium
- Avg. attendance: 21,444
- Agg. attendance: 257,327
- High attendance: 29,136 (North Queensland Cowboys, 30 July)
- Low attendance: 13,840 (Cronulla-Sutherland Sharks, 4 July)

Top scorers
- Tries: Xavier Coates (11)
- Goals: Jamayne Isaako (50)
- Points: Jamayne Isaako (124)
← 2020	List of seasons	2022 →

The 2021 Brisbane Broncos season was the 34th in the club's history. Coached by Kevin Walters and captained by Alex Glenn, the club competed in the 2021 National Rugby League season. The season marked Walters' first year as head coach of the Broncos following the club's worst-ever finish in 2020, which resulted in the sacking of former coach Anthony Seibold after the team won only three matches.

== Season summary ==
The 2021 season was viewed as a rebuilding year for the Brisbane Broncos following the club's worst campaign in history in 2020, where the side finished last for the first time and won only three matches. The club appointed former Broncos premiership player and Queensland coach Kevin Walters as head coach in September 2020 on a two-year deal, replacing interim coach Peter Gentle after the departure of Anthony Seibold during the 2020 season. Walters inherited a fractured playing group and significant pressure from supporters and media to restore the club's culture and competitiveness.

During the off-season, the Broncos underwent major roster and football department changes. High-profile departures already confirmed during the 2020 season were former captain Darius Boyd to retirement and representative forward David Fifita joining the Gold Coast Titans. Off-contract Jordan Kahu's contract was not renewed, while Jack Bird and Joe Ofahengaue were granted early releases to other clubs. Broncos veteran Andrew McCullough briefly returned from the Knights before he joined Bird at the Dragons in February, as Walters sought to reshape the roster. Notable off-season additions included former Broncos Dale Copley and David Mead and North Queensland Cowboys forward John Asiata while the club also handed playmaker Albert Kelly a train and trial contract.

Head of performance coach Paul Devlin, forwards consultant Corey Parker and defence coach Peter Ryan left in the off-season while long-term CEO Paul White moved on by mutual agreement in February. John Cartwright and Terry Matterson joined as Walters assistants, conditioning coach Andrew Croll was promoted to head of performance, Steve Walters joined his brother Kevin at the club as Football Administration Manager and former Broncos player Petero Civoniceva joined in a mentoring role. The Broncos were able to sign Melbourne Storm CEO Dave Donaghy as White's replacement.

The Broncos opened the season with two losses before recording their first victory under Walters in Round 3, defeating the Canterbury-Bankstown Bulldogs 24–0 at Suncorp Stadium. However, the team struggled for consistency throughout the first half of the season, suffering several heavy defeats against premiership contenders including the Melbourne Storm and South Sydney Rabbitohs. Brisbane's defence remained a major concern, conceding 695 points across the year, the second-worst defensive record in the competition.

Despite their poor ladder position, the Broncos produced several notable performances during the season. One of the club's biggest upsets came in Round 11 when Brisbane defeated the Sydney Roosters 34–16 at the Sydney Cricket Ground, with Albert Kelly shining on club debut. The side also secured victories over rivals the Gold Coast Titans, North Queensland Cowboys, and New Zealand Warriors, with young players such as Selwyn Cobbo, Kobe Hetherington, and TC Robati making their first-grade debuts during the year.

The season was heavily affected by instability both on and off the field. Contract disputes, player exits, and internal football department changes dominated headlines throughout the year. Senior playmaker Anthony Milford came under increasing pressure after coach Walters publicly declared in April that Milford was not playing well enough to earn a contract extension beyond 2021. Milford was later dropped to reserve grade for the first time in his NRL career following Brisbane's 35–6 loss to the South Sydney Rabbitohs. Highly rated teenager Reece Walsh accepted an offer to join the New Zealand Warriors from 2022 before being granted an early release by Brisbane in April. Walsh subsequently made his NRL debut for the Warriors and quickly emerged as one of the competition's brightest young talents. Walsh was then selected to make his State of Origin debut at fullback for Queensland, having played just seven NRL games for the Warriors, prompting further criticism of Brisbane's roster management. Halfback Tom Dearden also signed with the North Queensland Cowboys for 2022 before departing Brisbane mid-season after falling out of favour under Walters. Xavier Coates also accepted an offer to join a rival club for 2022.

Further controversy emerged surrounding forward Tevita Pangai Junior, whose future at the club became increasingly uncertain throughout the season amid disciplinary concerns and inconsistent performances. In June, Brisbane granted Pangai permission to negotiate with rival clubs after coach Walters vowed sweeping changes following the club's poor form. Pangai was ultimately released in July to join the Penrith Panthers for the remainder of the season before commencing a long-term deal with the Canterbury-Bankstown Bulldogs in 2022. Prop Matthew Lodge was also granted an immediate release mid-season to join the New Zealand Warriors. The departures highlighted the instability within Brisbane's roster during Walters' first season in charge.

Throughout May to July, Brisbane announced the signings of representative players Adam Reynolds, Kurt Capewell, and Brenko Lee for the 2022 season as part of the club's ongoing roster rebuild.

Off the field, the Broncos undertook a major overhaul of their football operations mid-season with the club again struggling at the bottom of the ladder, General Manager of Football Peter Nolan and Head of Performance Andrew Croll departed the club. Shortly afterwards, the club announced the appointment of former Broncos player and television commentator Ben Ikin as Football & Performance Director as part of broader structural changes aimed at rebuilding the club's long-term football program.

The Broncos finished the regular season in 14th place, winning seven of their 24 matches and missing the finals for a second consecutive year. Although the club again failed to contend for the premiership, the season was viewed by some as a modest improvement on 2020 due to increased competitiveness, the emergence of young talent, and signs of cultural rebuilding under Walters. Winger Xavier Coates finished as the club's leading try-scorer with 11 tries before departing for the Melbourne Storm at season's end, while Jamayne Isaako led the side in points with 124.

== Squad information ==
As of Round 25

Cap.	Nat.	Player	Position	First Broncos game	Previous First Grade RL club
130	(Australia)	Karmichael Hunt	Five-eighth	2004	—N/a
171	(Samoa)	Ben Te'o	Second-row	2009	(Australia) South Sydney Rabbitohs
172	(Cook Islands)	Alex Glenn (c)	Second-row	2009	—N/a
201	(Australia)	Corey Oates	Wing	2013	—N/a
209	(Samoa)	Anthony Milford	Five-eighth	2015	(Australia) Canberra Raiders
230	(Papua New Guinea)	David Mead	Wing	2017	(France) Catalans Dragons
232	(New Zealand)	Jamayne Isaako	Fullback	2017	—N/a
236	(Australia)	Payne Haas	Prop	2018	—N/a
238	(Tonga)	Kotoni Staggs	Centre	2018	—N/a
240	(Australia)	Jake Turpin	Hooker	2018	—N/a
242	(Australia)	Thomas Flegler	Prop	2019	—N/a
244	(Australia)	Patrick Carrigan	Lock	2019	—N/a
247	(Samoa)	Richard Kennar	Centre	2019	(Australia) South Sydney Rabbitohs
249	(England)	Herbie Farnworth	Centre	2019	—N/a
250	(Papua New Guinea)	Xavier Coates	Wing	2019	—N/a
251	(Samoa)	Keenan Palasia	Prop	2019	—N/a
252	(Australia)	Rhys Kennedy	Prop	2019	(Australia) South Sydney Rabbitohs
254	(New Zealand)	Jesse Arthars	Centre	2020	(Australia) Gold Coast Titans
255	(Australia)	Brodie Croft	Halfback	2020	(Australia) Melbourne Storm
257	(Australia)	Ethan Bullemor	Prop	2020	—N/a
258	(Tonga)	Tesi Niu	Fullback	2020	—N/a
259	(Australia)	Cory Paix	Hooker	2020	—N/a
261	(Australia)	Tyson Gamble	Halfback	2020	(Australia) Wests Tigers
262	(New Zealand)	Jordan Riki	Second-row	2020	—N/a
263	(Tonga)	John Asiata	Lock	2021	(Australia) North Queensland Cowboys
264	(Samoa)	Danny Levi	Hooker	2021	(Australia) Manly Warringah Sea Eagles
265	(Australia)	Kobe Hetherington	Lock	2021	—N/a
266	(Australia)	Albert Kelly	Halfback	2021	(England) Hull F.C.
267	(New Zealand)	TC Robati	Second-row	2021	—N/a
268	(Australia)	Selwyn Cobbo	Centre	2021	—N/a
269	(New Zealand)	Xavier Willison	Prop	2021	—N/a
270	(Australia)	Brendan Piakura	Second-row	2021	—N/a

== Squad transfers ==
=== Transfers in ===
Date	Position	Player	From	Year/s	Ref.
23 November 2020	Halfback	Albert Kelly	Hull Kingston Rovers	Train & Trial	
7 November 2020	Hooker	Andrew McCullough	Newcastle Knights	1 Year	
29 November 2020	Centre	Dale Copley	Gold Coast Titans	1 Year	
11 December 2020	Lock	John Asiata	North Queensland Cowboys	1 Year	
4 January 2021	Wing	David Mead	Catalans Dragons	1 Year	
15 April 2021	Five-eighth	Karmichael Hunt	Souths Logan Magpies (Mid-season)	Train & Trial	
20 April 2021	Hooker	Danny Levi	Norths Devils (Mid-season)	End of season	

=== Transfers out ===
Date	Position	Player	To	Year/s	Ref.
6 March 2020	Centre	Darius Boyd	Retirement	—N/a	
25 July 2020	Second-row	David Fifita	Gold Coast Titans	3 Years	
1 November 2020	Second-row	Jamil Hopoate	Released	—N/a	
1 November 2020	Centre	Jordan Kahu	Released	—N/a	
6 November 2020	Five-eighth	Sean O'Sullivan	New Zealand Warriors	1 Year	
6 November 2020	Fullback	Jack Bird	St. George Illawarra Dragons	2 Years	
29 November 2020	Prop	Joe Ofahengaue	Wests Tigers	3 Years	
1 December 2020	Centre	Ilikena Vudogo	Melbourne Rebels	3 Years	
18 December 2020	Prop	Pride Petterson-Robati	New Zealand Warriors	Train & Trial	
15 February 2021	Hooker	Andrew McCullough	St. George Illawarra Dragons	3 Years	
10 April 2021	Fullback	Reece Walsh	New Zealand Warriors (Mid-season)	3 1/2 Years	
29 May 2021	Halfback	Tom Dearden	North Queensland Cowboys (Mid-season)	3 1/2 Years	
1 July 2021	Prop	Matthew Lodge	New Zealand Warriors (Mid-season)	1 1/2 Years	
21 July 2021	Second-row	Tevita Pangai Junior	Penrith Panthers (Mid-season)	End of season	
2 August 2021	Centre	Dale Copley	Sydney Roosters (Mid-season)	End of season	

== Coaching staff ==
Name	Position	Ref.
Kevin Walters	Head Coach	
John Cartwright	Assistant Coach	
Terry Matterson	Assistant Coach	
Kurt Richards	Skills & Transition	
Dave Ballard	Head of Performance (interim)	
Ryan Whitely	Athletic Performance Coach	
Alex Corvo	Athletic Performance Coach	
Ben Ikin	Football & Performance Director	
Steve Walters	Football Administration Manager	
Simon Scanlan	Head of Recruitment & Academy (interim)	
Petero Civoniceva	Mentor	

== Staff changes ==
=== Transfers in ===
Date	Role	Person	From	Year/s	Ref.
30 September 2020	Head Coach	Kevin Walters	Queensland Maroons	2 Years	
15 October 2020	Assistant coach	John Cartwright	Manly Warringah Sea Eagles	2 Years	
15 October 2020	Assistant coach	Terry Matterson	Brisbane Tigers	2 Years	
1 May 2021	Chief Executive Officer	Dave Donaghy	Melbourne Storm		
21 June 2021	Football & Performance Director	Ben Ikin	NRL 360 (Co-host), QRL (Director)		

=== Transfers out ===
Date	Role	Person	To	Year/s	Ref.
28 September 2020	Head Coach (interim)	Peter Gentle	St. George Illawarra Dragons	—	
October 2020	Defence Coach	Peter Ryan	Released	—N/a	
6 November 2020	Head of Performance	Paul Devlin	Released	—N/a	
28 February 2021	Chief Executive Officer	Paul White	Resigned	—N/a	
18 June 2021	Head of Performance	Andrew Croll	Released (Mid-season)	—N/a	
18 June 2021	General Manager – Football Operations	Peter Nolan	Released (Mid-season)	—N/a	

== Regular season ==
As of Round 25

=== Result by round ===
Round	1	2	3	4	5	6	7	8	9	10	11	12	13	14	15	16	17	18	19	20	21	22	23	24	25
Ground	H	A	H	A	A	H	A	H	A	A	A	H	A	A	H	H	B	H	A	H	A	H	H	A	H
Result	L	L	W	L	L	L	L	W	L	L	W	L	L	L	L	W	B	L	L	W	L	L	W	L	W
Position	10	12	10	12	12	14	15	15	14	15	15	15	15	15	16	15	15	15	15	15	15	15	14	15	14
Points	0	0	2	2	2	2	2	4	4	4	6	6	6	6	6	8	10	10	10	12	12	12	14	14	16

Source: 2021 Draw
A = Away; H = Home; N = Neutral; B = Bye; W = Win; D = Draw; L = Loss

=== Matches ===
As of Round 25

Date	Rd	Opponent	H/A	Venue	Result	BRI	OPP	Tries	Goals	Field Goals	Ref
Friday 12 March	1	Parramatta Eels	H	Suncorp Stadium	Lost	16	24	David Mead, Xavier Coates (2)	Jamayne Isaako (2/3)	–	
Friday 19 March	2	Gold Coast Titans	A	Cbus Super Stadium	Lost	16	28	Tesi Niu, Xavier Coates, Tevita Pangai Junior	Jamayne Isaako (2/3)	–	
Saturday 27 March	3	Canterbury-Bankstown Bulldogs	H	Suncorp Stadium	Won	24	0	Jamayne Isaako (2), Xavier Coates, Herbie Farnworth	Jamayne Isaako (4/4)	–	
Friday 2 April	4	Melbourne Storm	A	AAMI Park	Lost	6	40	Xavier Coates	Jamayne Isaako (1/1)	–	
Thursday 8 April	5	South Sydney Rabbitohs	A	Stadium Australia	Lost	6	35	Jamayne Isaako	Jamayne Isaako (1/1)	–	
Thursday 15 April	6	Penrith Panthers	H	Suncorp Stadium	Lost	12	20	David Mead, Tevita Pangai Junior	Jamayne Isaako (2/2)	–	
Friday 23 April	7	Parramatta Eels	A	Bankwest Stadium	Lost	6	46	Tevita Pangai Junior	Jamayne Isaako (1/1)	–	
Friday 30 April	8	Gold Coast Titans	H	Suncorp Stadium	Won	36	28	David Mead (3), Anthony Milford, Jamayne Isaako, Corey Oates	Jamayne Isaako (6/7)	–	
Saturday 8 May	9	North Queensland Cowboys	A	Queensland Country Bank Stadium	Lost	18	19	Jamayne Isaako, Herbie Farnworth, Rhys Kennedy	Jamayne Isaako (3/3)	–	
Friday 14 May	10	Manly Warringah Sea Eagles	A	Suncorp Stadium	Lost	6	50	Jamayne Isaako	Jamayne Isaako (1/1)	–	
Saturday 22 May	11	Sydney Roosters	A	Sydney Cricket Ground	Won	34	16	David Mead, Albert Kelly, Keenan Palasia, John Asiata, Dale Copley, Tyson Gamble	Jamayne Isaako (5/6)	–	
Thursday 27 May	12	Melbourne Storm	H	Suncorp Stadium	Lost	12	40	Jesse Arthars, Herbie Farnworth	Jamayne Isaako (2/2)	–	
Thursday 3 June	13	St. George Illawarra Dragons	A	Netstrata Jubilee Stadium	Lost	24	52	Tevita Pangai Junior (2), Tyson Gamble, Jesse Arthars	Jamayne Isaako (4/4)	–	
Saturday 12 June	14	Canberra Raiders	A	GIO Stadium	Lost	16	38	Selwyn Cobbo, Herbie Farnworth, Jesse Arthars	Jamayne Isaako (2/3)	–	
Thursday 17 June	15	South Sydney Rabbitohs	H	Suncorp Stadium	Lost	0	46	–	–	–	
Sunday 4 July	16	Cronulla-Sutherland Sharks	H	Suncorp Stadium	Won	26	18	Kotoni Staggs, Alex Glenn, Tevita Pangai Junior, Corey Oates	Jamayne Isaako (5/5)	–	
	17	Bye									
Sunday 18 July	18	Wests Tigers	H	Suncorp Stadium	Lost	24	42	Kotoni Staggs (2), Tyson Gamble, Tesi Niu	Kotoni Staggs (4/4)	–	
Saturday 24 July	19	Penrith Panthers	A	Suncorp Stadium	Lost	12	18	Ethan Bullemor, Tesi Niu	Kotoni Staggs (2/2)	–	
Friday 30 July	20	North Queensland Cowboys	H	Suncorp Stadium	Won	37	18	Tesi Niu (2), Kotoni Staggs, Albert Kelly, Cory Paix, Herbie Farnworth	Kotoni Staggs (6/6)	Albert Kelly (1)	
Thursday 5 August	21	Newcastle Knights	A	McDonald Jones Stadium	Lost	20	28	Jordan Riki, Tyson Gamble, Corey Oates, Tesi Niu	Kotoni Staggs (2/4)	–	
Friday 13 August	22	Sydney Roosters	H	Suncorp Stadium	Lost	20	21	Albert Kelly, Tesi Niu, Corey Oates	Jamayne Isaako (4/4)	–	
Sunday 22 August	23	New Zealand Warriors	H	Suncorp Stadium	Won	24	22	Tesi Niu, Corey Oates, Jamayne Isaako, Brodie Croft	Jamayne Isaako (4/4)	–	
Saturday 28 August	24	Cronulla-Sutherland Sharks	A	Suncorp Stadium	Lost	16	24	Jamayne Isaako, TC Robati, Tesi Niu	Jamayne Isaako (2/3)	–	
Saturday 4 September	25	Newcastle Knights	H	Suncorp Stadium	Won	35	22	Selwyn Cobbo, Tesi Niu, Herbie Farnworth, Xavier Willison, Albert Kelly, Rhys Kennedy	Jamayne Isaako (5/6)	Albert Kelly (1)	

=== Ladder ===
As of Round 25

Pos	Team	Pld	W	D	L	B	PF	PA	PD	Pts	
1	Melbourne Storm (M)	24	21	0	3	1	815	316	+499	44	Advance to finals series
2	Penrith Panthers (P)	24	21	0	3	1	676	286	+390	44	Advance to finals series
3	South Sydney Rabbitohs	24	20	0	4	1	775	453	+322	42	Advance to finals series
4	Manly-Warringah Sea Eagles	24	16	0	8	1	744	492	+252	34	Advance to finals series
5	Sydney Roosters	24	16	0	8	1	630	489	+141	34	Advance to finals series
6	Parramatta Eels	24	15	0	9	1	566	457	+109	32	Advance to finals series
7	Newcastle Knights	24	12	0	12	1	428	571	−143	26	Advance to finals series
8	Gold Coast Titans	24	10	0	14	1	580	583	−3	22	Advance to finals series
9	Cronulla-Sutherland Sharks	24	10	0	14	1	520	556	−36	22	
10	Canberra Raiders	24	10	0	14	1	481	578	−97	22	
11	St. George Illawarra Dragons	24	8	0	16	1	474	616	−142	18	
12	New Zealand Warriors	24	8	0	16	1	453	624	−171	18	
13	Wests Tigers	24	8	0	16	1	500	714	−214	18	
14	Brisbane Broncos	24	7	0	17	1	446	695	−249	16	
15	North Queensland Cowboys	24	7	0	17	1	460	748	−288	16	
16	Canterbury-Bankstown Bulldogs (W)	24	3	0	21	1	340	710	−370	8	

Updated to match(es) played on 5 September 2021. Source: 2021 NRL Ladder
(M) Minor premiers; (P) Premiers; (W) Wooden spoon

== Representative honours ==
This table lists all players who played a representative match in 2021.

Player	All Stars	State of Origin 1	State of Origin 2	State of Origin 3
Xavier Coates	—N/a	Queensland	Queensland	Queensland
Thomas Flegler	—N/a	—	—	Queensland
Payne Haas	—N/a	New South Wales	New South Wales	New South Wales
Jordan Riki	Māori	—N/a	—N/a	—N/a

== Awards ==
=== 2021 Dally M Awards ===
- Prop of the Year: Payne Haas
- Tackle of the Year: Xavier Coates — on Dane Gagai, Round 15 vs Rabbitohs
- Female Player of the Year: Millie Boyle

=== Broncos Awards Night ===
Held on Thursday, 9 September 2021.

- Paul Morgan Medal (Player of the Year): Payne Haas
- Players' Player (Gary Balkin Award): Payne Haas
- Best Back (Allan Langer Award): Herbie Farnworth
- Best Forward (Shane Webcke Award): Payne Haas
- Most Consistent (Kevin Walters Award): Jake Turpin
- Rookie of the Year (Cyril Connell Award): Kobe Hetherington
- Play of the Year (Wally Lewis Award): Payne Haas – Round 16 vs Sharks, Payne Haas 50-metre sprint back against the run of play to tap a dangerous bouncing ball over the dead ball line and secure the win, 79th minute
- Clubperson of the Year: Eloise Kelly & Dave Ballard
- Community Service Award: Jamayne Isaako
- Broncos Club Life Memberships: Louise Lanigan & Kath Bennett

=== Rugby League Players’ Association Awards ===
- Prop of the Year: Payne Haas
