= 2020 Manly Warringah Sea Eagles season =

- NRL rank: 13
- 2020 record: Wins: 7; draws: 0; losses: 13
- Points scored: For: 375; against: 509

Team information
- CEO: (Australia) Stephen Humphreys
- Coach: (Australia) Des Hasler
- Assistant coach: (Australia) John Cartwright
- Captain: Daly Cherry-Evans
- Stadium: Brookvale Oval (Lottoland); Central Coast Stadium
- Avg. attendance: 3,414 (Not including home matches away from Brookvale)
- High attendance: 10,315 (vs MEL, round 1, Not including home matches away from Brookvale)

Top scorers
- Tries: (Tonga) Jorge Taufua (7)
- Goals: (Australia) Reuben Garrick (41)
- Points: (Australia) Reuben Garrick (98)
← 2019	2021 →

The 2020 Manly-Warringah Sea Eagles season was the 71st in the club's history since their entry into the then New South Wales Rugby Football League premiership in 1947. After twenty rounds, the team finished 13th on the NRL Ladder.

== COVID-19 Pandemic ==
Due to the COVID-19 pandemic, NRL matches were halted after the second round. The Sea Eagles were originally meant to play the New Zealand Warriors and Canberra Raiders in Rounds Three and Four, but the NRL announced an updated draw for those rounds on 15 May that gave the Sea Eagles fixtures against the Canterbury-Bankstown Bulldogs and the Parramatta Eels in those rounds.

The Sea Eagles played home games at Central Coast Stadium until the end of round seven where they then returned back to Brookvale.

== 2020 Squad ==
2020 Manly-Warringah Sea Eagles
Top 30 Squad			Development Players	Coaching Staff
(Australia) Morgan Boyle – PR, SR; (Australia) Daly Cherry-Evans (gk) (c) – HB; (Australia) Lachlan Croker – FE, HK, HB; (Australia) Cade Cust – FE, HK, HB; (Australia) Brendan Elliot – FB, WG, CE; (Tonga) Manase Fainu – HK; (New Zealand) Addin Fonua-Blake – PR; (Australia) Tevita Funa – FB, WG, CE; (Australia) Reuben Garrick (gk) – WG, FB; (Australia) Jack Gosiewski – SR	(Australia) Albert Hopoate – WG, FB; (Australia) Sean Keppie – SR, PR, LF; (Australia) Luke Metcalf – HB; (Australia) Brayden Musgrove – WG, CE; (Australia) Brad Parker – CE, WG; (Australia) Haumole Olakau'atu – SR; (New Zealand) Taniela Paseka – PR; (Australia) Josh Schuster – SR, FE; (Niue) Toafofoa Sipley – PR; (Australia) Curtis Sironen – SR	(Australia) Sam Smith – CE; (Tonga) Moses Suli – CE, WG; (Tonga) Jorge Taufua – WG; (New Zealand) Martin Taupau – PR; (Australia) Joel Thompson – SR; (Australia) Jake Trbojevic (vc) – LF, PR; (Australia) Tom Trbojevic – FB, WG, CE; (Australia) Corey Waddell – SR, LF; (Australia) Dylan Walker (gk) – CE, FE, FB; (Australia) Tony Williams – SR, CE	(Australia) Jade Anderson – FB, WG; (Lebanon) Abbas Miski – WG; (Australia) Zac Saddler – SR; (Australia) Keith Titmuss – SR; (Australia) Ben Trbojevic – SR; Extended squad: (Australia) Morgan Harper (gk) – CE	Head coach: (Australia) Des Hasler; Assistant coach: (Australia) John Cartwright; Legend: (c) Captain(s); (vc) Vice-captain(s); Updated: 7 November 2019; Source(s):

== Signings/Transfers ==
=== Gains ===
Player	2019 Club	2020 Club	Ref
Danny Levi	Newcastle Knights	Manly-Warringah Sea Eagles	
Morgan Harper	Canterbury-Bankstown Bulldogs	Manly-Warringah Sea Eagles	

=== Losses ===
Player	2019 Club	2020 Club	Ref
Kane Elgey	Manly-Warringah Sea Eagles	Retirement	
Trent Hodkinson	Manly-Warringah Sea Eagles	Retirement	
Apisai Koroisau	Manly-Warringah Sea Eagles	Penrith Panthers	
Lloyd Perrett	Manly-Warringah Sea Eagles	Wynnum-Manly Seagulls (Intrust Super Cup)	
Kelepi Tanginoa	Manly-Warringah Sea Eagles	Super League: Wakefield Trinity	

== Ladder ==
2020 NRL season
Pos	Team	Pld	W	D	L	B	PF	PA	PD	Pts
1	Penrith Panthers	20	18	1	1	0	537	238	+299	37
2	Melbourne Storm (P)	20	16	0	4	0	534	276	+258	32
3	Parramatta Eels	20	15	0	5	0	392	288	+104	30
4	Sydney Roosters	20	14	0	6	0	552	322	+230	28
5	Canberra Raiders	20	14	0	6	0	445	317	+128	28
6	South Sydney Rabbitohs	20	12	0	8	0	521	352	+169	24
7	Newcastle Knights	20	11	1	8	0	421	374	+47	23
8	Cronulla-Sutherland Sharks	20	10	0	10	0	480	480	0	20
9	Gold Coast Titans	20	9	0	11	0	346	463	−117	18
10	New Zealand Warriors	20	8	0	12	0	343	458	−115	16
11	Wests Tigers	20	7	0	13	0	440	505	−65	14
12	St. George Illawarra Dragons	20	7	0	13	0	378	452	−74	14
13	Manly Warringah Sea Eagles	20	7	0	13	0	375	509	−134	14
14	North Queensland Cowboys	20	5	0	15	0	368	520	−152	10
15	Canterbury-Bankstown Bulldogs	20	3	0	17	0	282	504	−222	6
16	Brisbane Broncos	20	3	0	17	0	268	624	−356	6

=== Ladder progression ===
- Numbers highlighted in green indicate that the team finished the round inside the top 8.
- Numbers highlighted in blue indicates the team finished first on the ladder in that round.
- Numbers highlighted in red indicates the team finished last place on the ladder in that round.

Team	1	2	3	4	5	6	7	8	9	10	11	12	13	14	15	16	17	18	19	20
Manly-Warringah Sea Eagles	0	2	4	4	6	8	8	8	8	10	12	12	12	12	12	12	12	14	14	14

== Fixtures ==
=== Regular season ===
Sunday 15 March	Manly-Warringah Sea Eagles	4 – 18	Melbourne Storm	Lottoland, Brookvale
4:05pm (AEST)	Tries: Goals: Reuben Garrick (2/2)	[ Report]	Tries: Suliasi Vunivalu (2), Tom Eisenhuth; Goals: Cameron Smith (3/4)	Attendance: 10,315; Referee: Matt Cecchin, Jon Stone

Saturday 21 March	Sydney Roosters	8 – 9	Manly-Warringah Sea Eagles	Leichhardt Oval, Leichhardt
5:30pm (AEST)	Tries: Daniel Tupou; Goals: Kyle Flanagan (2/3) (FG) (0/1)	[ Report]	Tries: Tom Trbojevic; Goals: Reuben Garrick (2/3), Daly Cherry-Evans (FG) (1/1)	Attendance: 0 (Due to the COVID-19 Pandemic); Referee: Ben Cummins, Belinda Sharpe

Sunday 31 May	Manly-Warringah Sea Eagles	32 – 6	Canterbury-Bankstown Bulldogs	Central Coast Stadium, Gosford
6:30pm (AEST)	Tries: Tom Trbojevic (2), Brad Parker (2), Jorge Taufua, Curtis Sironen, Reuben Garrick; Goals: Reuben Garrick (2/7)	[ Report]	Tries: Jake Averillobr/> Goals: Nick Meaney (1/1)	Attendance: 0 (Due to the COVID-19 Pandemic); Referee: Matt Cecchin

Saturday 6 June	Parramatta Eels	19 – 16	Manly-Warringah Sea Eagles	Bankwest Stadium, Parramatta
5:30pm (AEST)	Tries: Michael Jennings, Dylan Brown, Kane Evans; Goals: Mitchell Moses (3/4), Mitchell Moses (FG) (1/1)	[ Report]	Tries: Jorge Taufua (2), Dylan Walker; Goals: Reuben Garrick (2/4)	Attendance: 0 (Due to the COVID-19 Pandemic); Referee: Ben Cummins

Sunday 11 June	Manly-Warringah Sea Eagles	20 – 18	Brisbane Broncos	Central Coast Stadium, Gosford
7:50pm (AEST)	Tries: Tevita Funa, Daly Cherry-Evans, Moses Suli; Goals: Reuben Garrick (4/5)	[ Report]	Tries: Kotoni Staggs, Xavier Coates, Darius Boyd; Goals: Jamayne Isaako (3/3)	Attendance: 166; Referee: Ashley Klein

Sunday 21 June	Canberra Raiders	6 – 14	Manly-Warringah Sea Eagles	Campbelltown Stadium, Campbelltown
4:05pm (AEST)	Tries: Elliott Whitehead; Goals: Jarrod Croker (1/1)	[ Report]	Tries: Tom Trbojevic, Tevita Funa; Goals: Reuben Garrick (3/3)	Attendance: 0 (Due to the COVID-19 Pandemic); Referee: Grant Atkins

Sunday 28 June	Manly-Warringah Sea Eagles	40 – 22	Cronulla-Sutherland Sharks	Central Coast Stadium, Gosford
4:05pm (AEST)	Tries: Tevita Funa, Addin Fonua-Blake (2), Tevita Funa; Goals: Reuben Garrick (3/5)	[ Report]	Tries: Braden Hamlin-Uele, Sione Katoa (2), Jesse Ramien, Josh Dugan, Bryson Goodwin, Blayke Brailey; Goals: Shaun Johnson (6/7)	Attendance: 178; Referee: Adam Gee

Sunday 5 July	Manly-Warringah Sea Eagles	12 – 14	Newcastle Knights	Lottoland, Brookvale
4:05pm (AEST)	Tries: Daly Cherry-Evans, Cade Cust; Goals: Reuben Garrick (2/2)	[ Report]	Tries: Kurt Mann, Andrew McCullough; Goals: Kalyn Ponga (3/3)	Attendance: 2,271; Referee: Grant Atkins

Sunday, July 12	St. George Illawarra Dragons	34 – 4	Manly-Warringah Sea Eagles	Netstrata Jubilee Stadium, Kogarah
6:30pm (AEST)	Tries: Euan Aitken, Matthew Dufty, Josh Kerr, Zac Lomax, Corey Norman, Mikaele Ravalawa; Goals: Zac Lomax (5/7)	[ Report]	Tries: Joel Thompson; Goals: Reuben Garrick (0/1)	Attendance: 1,571; Referee: Matt Cecchin

Saturday, 18 July	Manly-Warringah Sea Eagles	12 – 14	Parramatta Eels	Lottoland, Brookvale
7:35pm (AEST)	Tries: Daly Cherry-Evans, Danny Levi, Martin Taupau, Joel Thompson; Goals: Reuben Garrick (3/4)	[ Report]	Tries: Michael Jennings (2), Waqa Blake, George Jennings; Goals: Clinton Gutherson (1/3)	Attendance: 2,021; Referee: Ashley Klein

== Player statistics ==
Note: Games and (sub) show total games played, e.g. 1 (1) is 2 games played.

Player	Games (sub)	Tries	Goals	FG	Points
(Australia) Morgan Boyle	2 (5)				
(Australia) Daly Cherry-Evans (c)	20	6	12	1	49
(Australia) Lachlan Croker	4 (16)	1			4
(Australia) Cade Cust	8 (2)	3			12
(Australia) Brendan Elliot	14 (1)	3			12
(Tonga) Addin Fonua-Blake	14 (1)	3			12
(Australia) Tevita Funa	12	5			20
(Australia) Reuben Garrick	17	4	41		98
(Australia) Jack Gosiewski	3 (10)	6			24
(New Zealand) Morgan Harper	4	3		12	
(Australia) Albert Hopoate	4 (1)				
(Australia) Sean Keppie	2 (17)				
(New Zealand) Daniel Levi	20	2			8
(Australia) Abbas Miski	2 (1)	2			8
(Australia) Haumole Olakau'atu	1 (4)	1			4
(Australia) Brad Parker	19	4			16
(New Zealand) Taniela Paseka	5 (13)	3			12
(Australia) Josh Schuster	1				
(Australia) Curtis Sironen	18	3			12
(Tonga) Moses Suli	13	2			8
(Tonga) Jorge Taufua	14	7			28
(New Zealand) Martin Taupau	16 (2)	2			8
(New Zealand) Joel Thompson	14	2			8
(Australia) Jake Trbojevic (vc)	20	2			8
(Australia) Tom Trbojevic	7	4			16
(Australia) Corey Waddell	5 (8)	1			8
(Australia) Dylan Walker	7	1			4
TOTAL	20	67	53	1	375
