= 2020 St. George Illawarra Dragons season =

2020 St. George rugby league season

- NRL rank: 12th
- NRL Nines: Runners-Up
- 2020 record: Wins: 7; draws: 0; losses: 13
- Points scored: For: 378; against: 452

Team information
- CEO: Ryan Webb
- Coach: Paul McGregor (Until 15 August); Dean Young (Interim from 16 August)
- Captain: Cameron McInnes
- Stadium: Netstrata Jubilee Stadium; WIN Stadium; Campbelltown Stadium

Top scorers
- Tries: Mikaele Ravalawa, Matt Dufty & Zac Lomax (13)
- Goals: Zac Lomax (63)
- Points: Zac Lomax (178)
← 2019	2021 →

The 2020 St. George Illawarra Dragons season was the 22nd in the joint venture club's history. The Dragons' men's team competed in the NRL's 2020 Telstra Premiership season. The women's team, meanwhile will play their third season in the NRLW's 2020 Telstra Women's Premiership season. Both teams competed in the 2020 NRL Nines, with the men's side coming runners-up and the women's side winning the tournament.

On 13 August, Paul McGregor departed as the head coach of the men's team. Assistant coach Dean Young took over as the interim coach of the first team for the remainder of the season.

== Squad ==
St. George Illawarra Dragons 2020 Squad
Top 30 Squad - 2020 Season			Development Players	Coaching Staff
Euan Aitken – CE; Eddie Blacker – PR; Billy Brittain – HK; Adam Clune – HB, FE; Jack de Belin – LK, PR; Matthew Dufty – FB; Kaide Ellis – PR, SR, LK; Jackson Ford – SR; Tyson Frizell (vc) – SR, LK; Tyrell Fuimaono – SR, CE	Jacob Host – SR, PR, LK; Ben Hunt (gk) – HB, HK, FE; Josh Kerr – PR, SR; Blake Lawrie – PR, LK; Zac Lomax (gk) – CE, FB; Joe Lovodua – HK, LK, SR, FE; Cameron McInnes (c) – HK, LK; Trent Merrin – LK, PR, SR; Corey Norman (gk) – FE, FB, HB; Jordan Pereira – WG, CE	Mikaele Ravalawa – WG, CE; Jason Saab – WG; Tristan Sailor – FE, FB, WG; Korbin Sims – PR, SR, LK; Tariq Sims – SR, LK; Paul Vaughan – PR; Brayden Wiliame – CE, WG, SR	Mat Feagai – CE; Max Feagai – CE; Hayden Lomax – HK; Cody Ramsey – FB; Shaun Sauni-Esau – CE; Jayden Sullivan – HB, FE	Head coach: Dean Young (caretaker); Assistant coaches: Ian Millward – Director of Rugby League Pathways; Shane Flanagan - Assistant Coach; Mathew Head – Assistant Coach / ISP Coach; Andrew Gray – Performance Director; Ciriaco Mescia – Strength & Conditioning Coach; Dan Lawson – Physiotherapist; Nathan Pickworth- Head of Athletic Performance; Legend: (c) Captain(s); (vc) Vice-captain(s); (gk) Goal kicker; Injured; Updated: 14 August 2020; Source(s): Dragons Team Profiles

=== Gains and losses ===
▲ or ▼	Player	2019 Club	2020 Club	Source
▲	Billy Brittain	South Sydney Rabbitohs	St. George Illawarra Dragons	
▲	Kaide Ellis	Penrith Panthers	St. George Illawarra Dragons	
▲	Tyrell Fuimaono	Penrith Panthers	St. George Illawarra Dragons	
▲	Issac Luke	New Zealand Warriors	St. George Illawarra Dragons	
▲	Trent Merrin	Leeds Rhinos (Super League)	St. George Illawarra Dragons	
▲	Brayden Wiliame	Catalans Dragons (Super League)	St. George Illawarra Dragons	
▼	Mitchell Allgood	St. George Illawarra Dragons	London Broncos (RFL Championship)	
▼	James Graham	St. George Illawarra Dragons	St Helens (Super League)	
▼	Patrick Kaufusi	St. George Illawarra Dragons	Townsville Blackhawks (Intrust Super Cup)	
▼	Tim Lafai	St. George Illawarra Dragons	Canterbury-Bankstown Bulldogs	
▼	Jeremy Latimore	St. George Illawarra Dragons	Retirement	
▼	Luciano Leilua	St. George Illawarra Dragons	Wests Tigers	
▼	Issac Luke	St. George Illawarra Dragons	Brisbane Broncos	
▼	Lachlan Maranta	St. George Illawarra Dragons	Wynnum Manly Seagulls (Intrust Super Cup)	
▼	Darren Nicholls	St. George Illawarra Dragons	Souths Logan Magpies (Intrust Super Cup)	
▼	Jonus Pearson	St. George Illawarra Dragons	Gold Coast Titans	
▼	Reece Robson	St. George Illawarra Dragons	North Queensland Cowboys	
▼	Gareth Widdop	St. George Illawarra Dragons	Warrington Wolves (Super League)	

== Ladder ==
=== NRL Nines ===
==== Pool stage ====
Pool 2
Team	Pld	W	D	L	PF	PA	PD	Pts
St. George Illawarra Dragons	2	1	0	1	34	20	+14	2
Parramatta Eels	2	1	0	1	25	20	+5	2
Cronulla-Sutherland Sharks	2	1	0	1	30	31	−1	2
Canterbury-Bankstown Bulldogs	2	1	0	1	17	35	−18	2

==== Finals ====
Quarter-finals
Newcastle Knights	7
Parramatta Eels	14
St. George Illawarra Dragons	17
Penrith Panthers	14
Gold Coast Titans	24
Manly Warringah Sea Eagles	0
North Queensland Cowboys	20
South Sydney Rabbitohs	6

Semi-finals
Parramatta Eels	6
St. George Illawarra Dragons	8
Gold Coast Titans	10
North Queensland Cowboys	19

Final
St. George Illawarra Dragons	14
North Queensland Cowboys	23

=== NRL season ===
Pos	Team	Pld	W	D	L	B	PF	PA	PD	Pts	
1	Penrith Panthers (M)	20	18	1	1	0	537	238	+299	37	Advance to finals series
2	Melbourne Storm (P)	20	16	0	4	0	534	276	+258	32	Advance to finals series
3	Parramatta Eels	20	15	0	5	0	392	288	+104	30	Advance to finals series
4	Sydney Roosters	20	14	0	6	0	552	322	+230	28	Advance to finals series
5	Canberra Raiders	20	14	0	6	0	445	317	+128	28	Advance to finals series
6	South Sydney Rabbitohs	20	12	0	8	0	521	352	+169	24	Advance to finals series
7	Newcastle Knights	20	11	1	8	0	421	374	+47	23	Advance to finals series
8	Cronulla-Sutherland Sharks	20	10	0	10	0	480	480	0	20	Advance to finals series
9	Gold Coast Titans	20	9	0	11	0	346	463	−117	18	
10	New Zealand Warriors	20	8	0	12	0	343	458	−115	16	
11	Wests Tigers	20	7	0	13	0	440	505	−65	14	
12	St. George Illawarra Dragons	20	7	0	13	0	378	452	−74	14	
13	Manly Warringah Sea Eagles	20	7	0	13	0	375	509	−134	14	
14	North Queensland Cowboys	20	5	0	15	0	368	520	−152	10	
15	Canterbury-Bankstown Bulldogs	20	3	0	17	0	282	504	−222	6	
16	Brisbane Broncos (W)	20	3	0	17	0	268	624	−356	6	

Updated to match(es) played on 27 September 2020. Source: 2020 NRL Ladder
(M) Minor premiers; (P) Premiers; (W) Wooden spoon

=== Ladder progression ===
Round	1	2	3	4	5	6	7	8	9	10	11	12	13	14	15	16	17	18	19	20
Ladder position	13th	13th	14th	16th	14th	12th	12th	13th	11th	11th	11th	11th	12th	11th	10th	10th	11th	13th	13th	12th

== Season results ==
=== NRL Nines ===
Round	Home	Score	Away	Match information				
Round	Home	Score	Away	Date and time (AEDT)	Venue	Referee	Attendance	Source
Pool stage	St George Illawarra Dragons	27 – 5	Cronulla-Sutherland Sharks	Friday, 14 February, 8:45 pm	HBF Park	Chris Butler	10,128	
Pool stage	Parramatta Eels	15 – 7	St George Illawarra Dragons	Saturday, 15 February, 3:25 pm	HBF Park		14,739	
Quarter-final	St George Illawarra Dragons	17 – 14	Penrith Panthers	Saturday, 15 February, 6:05 pm	HBF Park	Ben Cummins	14,739	
Semi-final	Parramatta Eels	6 – 8	St George Illawarra Dragons	Saturday, 15 February, 8:20 pm	HBF Park	Grant Atkins	14,739	
Grand Final	St George Illawarra Dragons	14 – 23	North Queensland Cowboys	Saturday, 15 February, 10:00 pm	HBF Park	Grant Atkins	14,739	

=== Pre-season trials ===
Round	Home	Score	Away	Match information				
Round	Home	Score	Away	Date and time (AEDT)	Venue	Referee	Attendance	Source
1	Newcastle Knights	12 – 38	St George Illawarra Dragons	Saturday, 22 February, 5:30 pm	Maitland No.1 Sportsground	Matt Cecchin, Jon Stone	—	
2 (Charity Shield)	South Sydney Rabbitohs	26 – 12	St George Illawarra Dragons	Saturday, 29 February, 7:00 pm	Glen Willow Regional Sports Stadium	Ashley Klein, Gavin Badger	9,124	

=== NRL season ===
Round	Home	Score	Away	Match information				
Round	Home	Score	Away	Date and time (AEDT)	Venue	Referee	Attendance	Source
1	St. George Illawarra Dragons	14 – 24	Wests Tigers	Sunday, 15 March, 6:15 pm	WIN Stadium	Ashley Klein, Phil Henderson	9,137	
2	St. George Illawarra Dragons	28 – 32	Penrith Panthers	Friday, 20 March, 6:00 pm	Netstrata Jubilee Stadium	Matt Cecchin, Jon Stone	0^{a}	
3	New Zealand Warriors	18 – 0	St. George Illawarra Dragons	Saturday, 30 May, 3:00 pm	Central Coast Stadium	Chris Sutton	0^{a}	
4 (Queen's Birthday)	Canterbury-Bankstown Bulldogs	22 – 2	St. George Illawarra Dragons	Monday, 8 June, 4:05 pm	Bankwest Stadium	Henry Perenara	0^{a}	
5	St. George Illawarra Dragons	30 – 16	Cronulla-Sutherland Sharks	Sunday, 14 June, 6:30 pm	Campbelltown Stadium	Henry Perenara	—	
6	Gold Coast Titans	8 – 20	St. George Illawarra Dragons	Saturday, 20 June, 3:00 pm	Suncorp Stadium	Chris Sutton	1,930	
7	Sydney Roosters	26 – 12	St. George Illawarra Dragons	Friday, 26 June, 7:55 pm	Bankwest Stadium	Grant Atkins	—	
8	Canberra Raiders	22 – 16	St. George Illawarra Dragons	Friday, 3 July, 6:00 pm	GIO Stadium	Matt Cecchin	2,500	
9	St. George Illawarra Dragons	34 – 4	Manly Warringah Sea Eagles	Sunday, 12 July, 6:30 pm	Netstrata Jubilee Stadium	Matt Cecchin	1,571	
10	St. George Illawarra Dragons	28 – 22	Canterbury-Bankstown Bulldogs	Saturday, 18 July, 3:00 pm	WIN Stadium	Henry Perenara	1,619	
11	Cronulla-Sutherland Sharks	28 – 24	St. George Illawarra Dragons	Saturday, 25 July, 5:30 pm	Netstrata Jubilee Stadium	Grant Atkins	3,179	
12	St. George Illawarra Dragons	24 – 32	South Sydney Rabbitohs	Thursday, 30 July, 7:50 pm	Netstrata Jubilee Stadium	Ashley Klein	2,719	
13	St. George Illawarra Dragons	16 – 24	Sydney Roosters	Thursday, 6 August, 7:50 pm	WIN Stadium	Ashley Klein	—	
14	Parramatta Eels	12 – 14	St. George Illawarra Dragons	Friday, 14 August, 7:55 pm	Bankwest Stadium	Grant Atkins	—	
15	Brisbane Broncos	24 – 28	St. George Illawarra Dragons	Friday, 21 August, 7:55 pm	Suncorp Stadium	Henry Perenara	—	
16	St. George Illawarra Dragons	10 – 14	Gold Coast Titans	Friday, 28 August, 6:00 pm	Netstrata Jubilee Stadium	Henry Perenara	2,097	
17	North Queensland Cowboys	23 – 22	St. George Illawarra Dragons	Sunday, 6 September, 6:30 pm	Queensland Country Bank Stadium	Adam Gee	6,755	
18	St. George Illawarra Dragons	8 – 37	Canberra Raiders	Saturday, 12 September, 3:00 pm	WIN Stadium	Adam Gee → Matt Cecchin^{b}	2,588	
19	Newcastle Knights	42 – 18	St. George Illawarra Dragons	Sunday, 20 September, 4:05 pm	McDonald Jones Stadium	Grant Atkins	6,659	
20	St. George Illawarra Dragons	30 – 22	Melbourne Storm	Sunday, 27 September, 4:05 pm	Netstrata Jubilee Stadium	Matt Cecchin	2,738	

Notes

^{a}Matches in rounds two, three and four were played behind closed doors due to the COVID-19 pandemic.

^{b}Adam Gee was substituted after half time as referee in the round 18 game for Matt Cecchin after receiving a calf injury during the game.

== Representative honours ==
Player	2020 All Stars match	State of Origin
Josh Kerr	Indigenous All Stars	Queensland
Tyrell Fuimaono	Indigenous All Stars	–
Issac Luke	Māori All Stars	–
Tyson Frizell	–	New South Wales
Zac Lomax	–	New South Wales
Cameron McInnes	–	New South Wales
Ben Hunt	–	Queensland
