= TC Robati =

NZ rugby league footballer

Personal information
- Full name: Teui Robati
- Born: 14 November 2001 (age 24) Porirua, New Zealand
- Height: 183 cm (6 ft 0 in)
- Weight: 105 kg (16 st 7 lb)

Playing information
- Position: Second-row, Lock
Club
Years	Team	Pld	T	G	FG	P
2021–22	Brisbane Broncos	17	2	0	0	8
Representative
Years	Team	Pld	T	G	FG	P
2022	Māori All Stars	1	0	0	0	0
- Source: As of 11 June 2021

Teui "TC" Robati (born 14 November 2001) is a New Zealand professional rugby league footballer who last played as a second-rower for the Brisbane Broncos in the National Rugby League (NRL).

== Background ==
Born in Porirua, New Zealand, Robati is of Cook Islands and Māori descent.

He played his junior rugby league for the Porirua Vikings before being signed by the Brisbane Broncos. In Australia, he attended Mabel Park State High School and Marsden State High School, where he represented the Queensland Schoolboys.

== Playing career ==
=== Early career ===
In 2019, Robati played for the Wynnum Manly Seagulls in the Mal Meninga Cup, starting at second-row in their Grand Final loss to the Tweed Heads Seagulls. In 2020, he played for Wynnum Manly's Hastings Deering Colts side.

=== 2021 ===
In 2021, Robati joined Brisbane's NRL squad on a development contract and played for Wynnum Manly in the Queensland Cup.

In Round 12 of the 2021 NRL season, Robati was named to make his NRL debut against the Melbourne Storm. The following week, he scored two tries in a 52–24 loss against St. George Illawarra.

=== 2022 ===
Robati played seven games for Brisbane in the 2022 NRL season as the club finished 9th on the table.

== Controversy ==
In September 2021, Robati was arrested by police after a dangerous driving incident. It was alleged that Robati was a passenger in his girlfriend's vehicle when he grabbed on the steering wheel which caused the car to swerve across other lanes on the road and veered into oncoming traffic. Robati later received a $1,000 fine with no conviction recorded, and a six-month disqualification from driving. On 30 December 2022, it was announced that Robati had been stood down from all club activities, following an alleged incident involving a woman at a Brisbane venue. Robati was ordered to attend court in January 2023 after being charged with one count of sexual assault in relation to the incident which happened on 21 December 2022. On 2 February 2023, it was revealed that Robati had been charged by Queensland Police for allegedly driving without a licence around 3.50pm on Australia Day. Robati was ordered to appear Brisbane Magistrates Court on 2 March 2023. On 11 June 2025, it was reported that Robati had been found not guilty of rape in a public toilet, in which the Crown prosecutor alleged Robati lured the woman into a toilet promising access to an exclusive event before raping her.
