= Tevita Funa =

Australian rugby league footballer

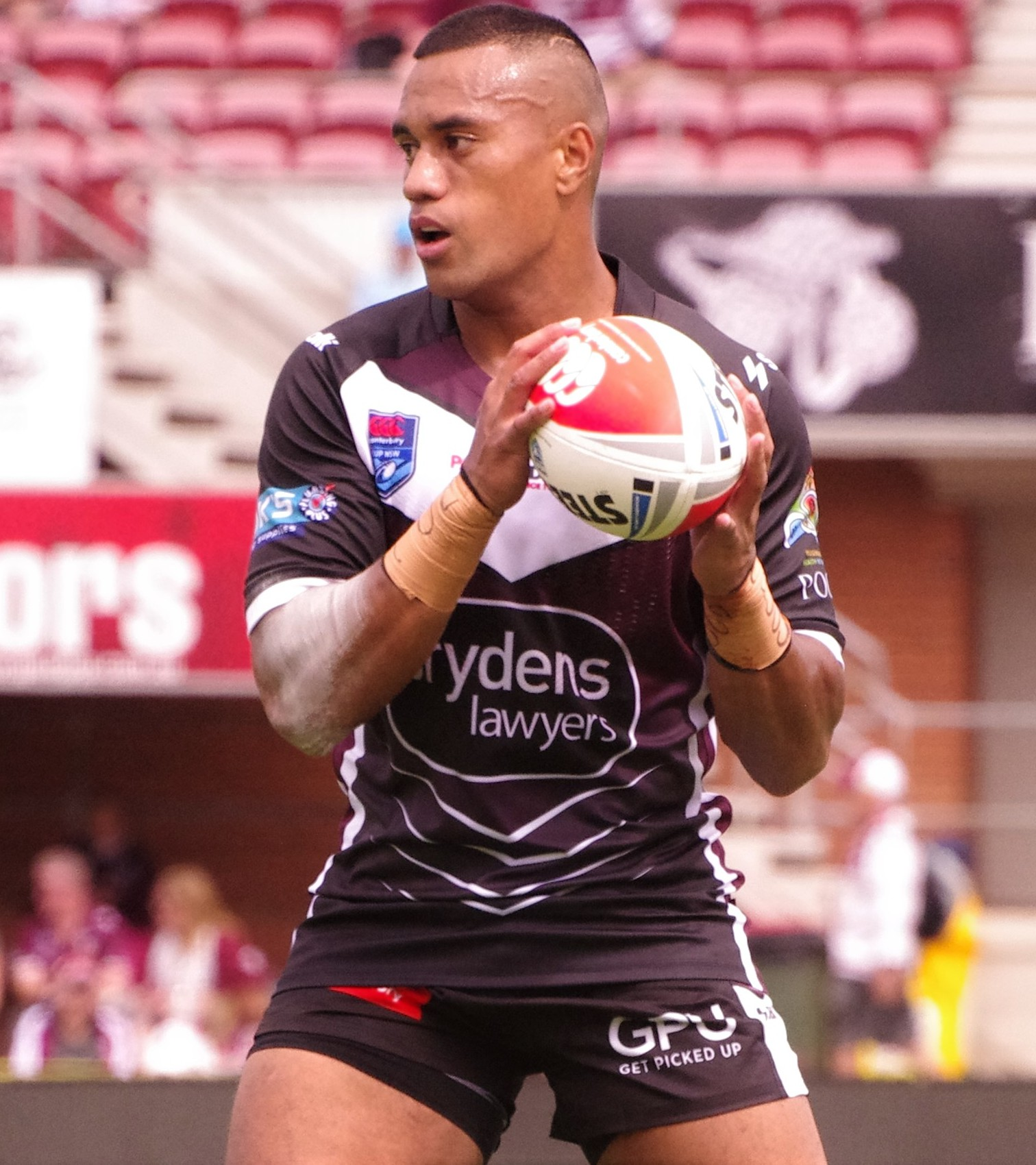

Personal information
- Born: 3 January 1998 (age 27); Sydney, New South Wales, Australia
- Height: 186 cm (6 ft 1 in)
- Weight: 93 kg (14 st 9 lb)

Playing information
- Position: Wing, Fullback, Centre
Club
Years	Team	Pld	T	G	FG	P
2020–21	Manly Sea Eagles	16	5	0	0	20
- Source: As of 5 June 2021

Tevita Funa (born 3 January 1998) is a professional rugby union footballer for the New South Wales Waratahs and a former rugby league wing, fullback and centre for the Manly-Warringah Sea Eagles in the NRL.

== Early life ==
Funa was born in Sydney, Australia, and is of Tongan descent.

He played his junior rugby league for the Guildford Owls and Mounties.

== Playing career ==
=== 2020 ===
Funa made his debut in round 5 of the 2020 NRL season for Manly-Warringah against the Brisbane Broncos. He scored a try as Manly won 20–18.

He made a total of 12 appearances throughout the year scoring five tries. Manly missed out on the finals finishing 13th.

=== 2021 ===
Funa was limited to only four matches in the 2021 NRL season for Manly. On October 6, he was released by the Manly club. After his release from Manly, Funa had signed with the New South Wales Waratahs in rugby union.
