= 2020 Parramatta Eels season =

Australia Rugby League Parramatta Eels 2020 season

- NRL Rank: 3rd
- Play-off result: Semi-finalists (Lost 24–38 vs South Sydney Rabbitohs, 2nd Semi Final)
- World Club Challenge: DNQ
- NRL Nines: Semi-finalists (Lost 6–8 vs St. George Illawarra Dragons, 1st Semi Final)
- 2020 record: Wins: 15; draws: 0; losses: 5
- Points scored: For: 392; against: 288

Team information
- CEO: Jim Sarantinos
- Coach: (Australia) Brad Arthur
- Captain: (Australia) Clinton Gutherson
- Stadium: Bankwest Stadium (Capacity: 30,000)
- Avg. attendance: 6,176 (Home); 4,736 (Home & Away); 15,374 (Finals Series)
- Agg. attendance: 61,764 (Home); 94,724 (Home & Away); 30,748 (Finals Series)
- High attendance: 21,363 (12 March vs Canterbury-Bankstown Bulldogs, Round 1)

Top scorers
- Tries: (Fiji) Maika Sivo (15)
- Goals: (Lebanon) Mitchell Moses (56)
- Points: (Lebanon) Mitchell Moses (125)
← 2019	List of seasons	2021 →

The 2020 Parramatta Eels season was the 74th in the club's history. Coached by Brad Arthur and captained by Clinton Gutherson, they competed in the NRL's 2020 Telstra Premiership.

== Summary ==
Parramatta started the 2020 season in fine form winning eight of their opening ten matches to sit first on the competition table. At the end of the 2020 regular season, Parramatta finished third, their best end to a season since 2005. In the qualifying final, Parramatta once again had to face Melbourne. After leading 12-0 early on in the game, Parramatta would lose 36-24. The following week in the elimination final, Parramatta went into half-time with a 18-8 lead over South Sydney but a second half capitulation which included Mitchell Moses missing a penalty goal directly in front of the posts which lead to a Souths try saw Parramatta lose 38-24 ending their season.

== Standings ==
2020 NRL season
Pos	Team	Pld	W	D	L	B	PF	PA	PD	Pts
1	Penrith Panthers	20	18	1	1	0	537	238	+299	37
2	Melbourne Storm (P)	20	16	0	4	0	534	276	+258	32
3	Parramatta Eels	20	15	0	5	0	392	288	+104	30
4	Sydney Roosters	20	14	0	6	0	552	322	+230	28
5	Canberra Raiders	20	14	0	6	0	445	317	+128	28
6	South Sydney Rabbitohs	20	12	0	8	0	521	352	+169	24
7	Newcastle Knights	20	11	1	8	0	421	374	+47	23
8	Cronulla-Sutherland Sharks	20	10	0	10	0	480	480	0	20
9	Gold Coast Titans	20	9	0	11	0	346	463	−117	18
10	New Zealand Warriors	20	8	0	12	0	343	458	−115	16
11	Wests Tigers	20	7	0	13	0	440	505	−65	14
12	St. George Illawarra Dragons	20	7	0	13	0	378	452	−74	14
13	Manly Warringah Sea Eagles	20	7	0	13	0	375	509	−134	14
14	North Queensland Cowboys	20	5	0	15	0	368	520	−152	10
15	Canterbury-Bankstown Bulldogs	20	3	0	17	0	282	504	−222	6
16	Brisbane Broncos	20	3	0	17	0	268	624	−356	6

== Fixtures ==
=== NRL Nines ===
Match no.	Home	Score	Away	Match information		
Match no.	Home	Score	Away	Date and time (local)	Venue	Attendance
1	Canterbury-Bankstown Bulldogs	13 – 10	Parramatta Eels	Friday, 14 February, 5:20 pm	HBF Park	10,128
2	Parramatta Eels	15 – 7	St. George Illawarra Dragons	Saturday, 15 February, 12:25 pm	HBF Park	14,739
QF	Newcastle Knights	7 – 14	Parramatta Eels	Saturday, 15 February, 2:40 pm	HBF Park	14,739
SF	Parramatta Eels	6 – 8	St. George Illawarra Dragons	Saturday, 15 February, 5:20 pm	HBF Park	14,739
GF	Did not qualify				HBF Park	14,739

=== Pre-season ===
Round	Home	Score	Away	Match information		
Round	Home	Score	Away	Date and time (local)	Venue	Attendance
1	Parramatta Eels	24 – 28	South Sydney Rabbitohs	Friday, 21 February, 7:00 pm	Ringrose Park	
2	Penrith Panthers	22 – 22	Parramatta Eels	Saturday, 29 February, 4:00 pm	Bega Recreation Ground	4,867

=== Home and away season ===
Round	Home	Score	Away	Match information		
Round	Home	Score	Away	Date and time (local)	Venue	Attendance
1	Parramatta Eels	8 – 2	Canterbury-Bankstown Bulldogs	Thursday, 12 March, 8:05 pm	Bankwest Stadium	21,363
2	Gold Coast Titans	6 – 46	Parramatta Eels	Sunday, 22 March, 6:15 pm	Cbus Super Stadium	0^{a}
3	Brisbane Broncos	6 – 34	Parramatta Eels	Thursday, 28 May, 7:50 pm	Suncorp Stadium	0^{a}
4	Parramatta Eels	19 – 16	Manly Warringah Sea Eagles	Saturday, 6 June, 5:30 pm	Bankwest Stadium	0^{a}
5	Parramatta Eels	16 – 10	Penrith Panthers	Friday, 12 June, 7:55 pm	Bankwest Stadium	507
6	Sydney Roosters	24 – 10	Parramatta Eels	Saturday, 20 June, 7:35 pm	Bankwest Stadium	579
7	Parramatta Eels	25 – 24	Canberra Raiders	Saturday, 27 June, 7:35 pm	Bankwest Stadium	560
8	Parramatta Eels	42 – 4	North Queensland Cowboys	Friday, 3 July, 7:55 pm	Bankwest Stadium	6,730
9	Newcastle Knights	4 – 10	Parramatta Eels	Sunday, 12 July, 4:05 pm	McDonald Jones Stadium	6,980
10	Manly Warringah Sea Eagles	22 – 18	Parramatta Eels	Saturday, 18 July, 7:35 pm	Lottoland	2,021
11	Parramatta Eels	26 – 16	Wests Tigers	Thursday, 23 July, 7:50 pm	Bankwest Stadium	6,403
12	Canterbury-Bankstown Bulldogs	16 – 18	Parramatta Eels	Sunday, 2 August, 2:00 pm	ANZ Stadium	5,775
13	Cronulla-Sutherland Sharks	12 – 14	Parramatta Eels	Sunday, 9 August, 4:05 pm	Netstrata Jubilee Stadium	1,714
14	Parramatta Eels	12 – 14	St. George Illawarra Dragons	Friday, 14 August, 7:55 pm	Bankwest Stadium	6,290
15	Parramatta Eels	14 – 0	Melbourne Storm	Thursday, 20 August, 7:50 pm	Bankwest Stadium	6,282
16	Parramatta Eels	0 – 38	South Sydney Rabbitohs	Thursday, 27 August, 7:50 pm	Bankwest Stadium	7,012
17	New Zealand Warriors	18 – 24	Parramatta Eels	Sunday, 6 September, 4:05 pm	Central Coast Stadium	4,577
18	Penrith Panthers	20 – 2	Parramatta Eels	Friday, 11 September, 7:55 pm	Panthers Stadium	3,955
19	Parramatta Eels	26 – 12	Brisbane Broncos	Friday, 18 September, 7:55 pm	Bankwest Stadium	6,617
20	Wests Tigers	24 – 28	Parramatta Eels	Saturday, 26 September, 7:35 pm	Bankwest Stadium	7,359

Notes: ^{a} From round 2 to round 4, all matches were played behind closed doors due to the COVID-19 pandemic.

=== Finals series ===
Round	Home	Score	Away	Match information		
Round	Home	Score	Away	Date and time (local)	Venue	Attendance
QF	Melbourne Storm	36 – 24	Parramatta Eels	Saturday, 3 October, 7:50 pm	Suncorp Stadium	16,238
SF	Parramatta Eels	24 – 38	South Sydney Rabbitohs	Saturday, 10 October, 7:50 pm	Bankwest Stadium	14,510

== Players and staff ==
The playing squad and coaching staff of the Parramatta Eels for the 2020 NRL season as of 14 August 2020.

Parramatta Eels
Top 30 squad			Extended squad	Coaching staff
Daniel Alvaro – PR; Waqa Blake – CE, WG; Dylan Brown – FE, HB; Nathan Brown – LK, SR, PR; Reagan Campbell-Gillard – PR; Andrew Davey – SR; Rhys Davies – HK, HB; Haze Dunster – WG, CE; Kane Evans – PR; Blake Ferguson – WG, CE, FB	Jai Field – FE, FB, HB; David Gower – SR, LK, PR; Clinton Gutherson (c) – FB, FE, CE, WG; George Jennings – WG; Michael Jennings – CE; Oregon Kaufusi – PR, LK; Shaun Lane – SR; Reed Mahoney – HK; Ryan Matterson – SR, LK, FE, CE; Mitchell Moses – HB, FE, FB	Marata Niukore – SR, LK; Junior Paulo – PR; Jordan Rankin – FB, WG, FE; Jaeman Salmon – FE, CE; Maika Sivo – WG; Will Smith – FB, FE, WG, HK; Ray Stone – LK, HK; Brad Takairangi – CE, SR, FE; Peni Terepo – PR, LK; Stefano Utoikamanu – PR, SR	Watson Heleta (DP) – FB, CE; Sam Hughes (DP) – PR; Kyle Schneider (DP) – HK	Head coach: Brad Arthur; Assistant coaches: Steve Murphy; David Kidwell; Michael Potter (Development coach); Robert Taylor (ISP NSW coach); Dean Feeney (Jersey Flegg coach); Legend: (c) Captain(s); (vc) Vice-captain(s); Updated: 14 August 2020; Source(s): Eels Team Profiles

== Transfers ==
In:

Nat.	Pos.	Name	From	Transfer window	Date	Ref.
(Australia)	PR	Reagan Campbell-Gillard	Penrith Panthers	Pre-season	September 2019	
(Australia)	SR	Ryan Matterson	Wests Tigers	Pre-season	November 2019	
(Australia)	PR	Sam Hughes	Youth	Pre-season	November 2019	
(Australia)	HK	Kyle Schneider	Youth	Pre-season	November 2019	
(Australia)	HK	Rhys Davies	Youth	Pre-season	February 2020	
(New Zealand)	FB	Watson Heleta	Western Suburbs Magpies	Pre-season	February 2020	
(Australia)	FE	Jai Field	St. George Illawarra Dragons	Mid-season	May 2020	
(Australia)	FB	Jordan Rankin	Huddersfield Giants	Mid-season	June 2020	

Out:

Nat.	Pos.	Name	To	Transfer window	Date	Ref.
(Cook Islands)	SR	Tepai Moeroa	NSW Waratahs (rugby union)	Pre-season	July 2019	
(Tonga)	SR	Manu Ma’u	Hull F.C.	Pre-season	July 2019	
(Lebanon)	PR	Tim Mannah	Retired	Pre-season	September 2019	
(New Zealand)	HK	Matt McIlwrick	Retired	Pre-season	November 2019	
(New Zealand)	WG	Greg Leleisiuao	Gold Coast Titans	Pre-season	January 2020	
(Fiji)	SR	Salesi Fainga'a	Western Suburbs Magpies	Pre-season	February 2020	
(New Zealand)	FB	Josh Hoffman	Townsville Blackhawks	Pre-season	February 2020	
(Australia)	WG	Ethan Parry	Released	Mid-season	May 2020	
