= 2020 Newcastle Knights season =

- NRL Rank: 7th
- Play-off result: Elimination Finalists (Week 1)
- 2020 record: Wins: 11; draws: 1; losses: 8
- Points scored: For: 421; against: 374

Team information
- CEO: Phil Gardner
- Coach: Adam O'Brien
- Captain: Mitchell Pearce
- Stadium: McDonald Jones Stadium
- Avg. attendance: 4,614
- High attendance: 10,239

Top scorers
- Tries: Enari Tuala (11)
- Goals: Kalyn Ponga (46)
- Points: Kalyn Ponga (132)
← 2019	2021 →

The 2020 Newcastle Knights season was the 33rd in the club's history. Coached by Adam O'Brien and captained by Mitchell Pearce, they competed in the NRL's 2020 Telstra Premiership. On 23 March, the NRL announced that the season would be suspended after round 2, until further notice due to the COVID-19 pandemic. The NRL returned on 28 May with a new draw, the Knights' round 3 game coming on 31 May against the Penrith Panthers. The Knights finished the regular season in 7th place (out of 16), thus reaching the finals but were knocked out after losing to the South Sydney Rabbitohs in week 1.

== Squad ==
Newcastle Knights
2020 NRL premiership (Top 30) squad			Development players	Coaching staff
253 Sione Mata'utia – SR, LK, FE; 260 Danny Levi – HK (pre-season loss); 261 Lachlan Fitzgibbon – SR, CE; 268 Daniel Saifiti – PR, SR; 269 Jacob Saifiti – PR, LK; 273 Josh King – LK; 276 Mitchell Barnett – LK, SR, PR; 289 Herman Ese'ese – LK, PR; 291 Aidan Guerra – SR, LK (gk); 294 Tautau Moga – CE; 295 Mitchell Pearce (c) – HB; 296 Kalyn Ponga – FB (gk)	297 Connor Watson – LK, FE, HK; 300 Pasami Saulo – LK; 303 Tim Glasby – LK, PR (mid-season retirement); 304 Hymel Hunt – WG; 305 David Klemmer – PR, LK; 306 Edrick Lee – WG; 307 Kurt Mann – FE, HB, LK, HK; 309 Mason Lino – FE (gk); 310 Phoenix Crossland – HK, FE; 311 Bradman Best – CE, WG; 312 Starford To'a – WG; 313 Jayden Brailey – HK	314 Gehamat Shibasaki – CE; 315 Enari Tuala – CE, WG; 316 Tex Hoy – FB, FE, WG, LK, HB (gk); 317 Chris Randall – HK; 318 Brodie Jones – SR, PR; 319 Andrew McCullough – HK (mid-season loss); 320 Blake Green – FE; 000 Beau Fermor – SR (pre-season loss); 000 Jirah Momoisea – SR; 000 Tyronne Roberts-Davis – WG	Mat Croker – PR; Luke Huth – HK; Simi Sasagi – FE; Extended squad players: Mitch Black – HK; Jack Cameron – SR; Matt Cooper – FB; Zac Hosking – LK; Dylan Lucas – FE; Toby Marks – WG; Brandon Russell – LK; Bayden Searle – HB; Matt Soper-Lawler – WG	Head coach: Adam O'Brien; Assistant coaches: David Furner; Willie Peters; Tony Gleeson - Canterbury Cup NSW coach; Adam Bettridge - Jersey Flegg Cup coach; Legend: (c) Captain(s); (vc) Vice-captain(s); Updated: 4 August 2020; Source(s): Newcastle Knights Profiles, Rugby League Project

== Transfers and Re-signings ==
=== Gains ===
Player/Coach	Previous club	Length
Adam Bettridge (Jersey Flegg Cup coach)	Macquarie Scorpions	2020
Jayden Brailey	Cronulla-Sutherland Sharks	2022
Matt Cooper	Eastern Suburbs Tigers	2020
David Furner (assistant coach)	Leeds Rhinos	2022
Blake Green	New Zealand Warriors	2020
Andrew McCullough	Brisbane Broncos	2020
Adam O'Brien (head coach)	Sydney Roosters	2022
Willie Peters (assistant coach)	South Sydney Rabbitohs	2020
Tyronne Roberts-Davis	Burleigh Bears	2020
Gehamat Shibasaki	Brisbane Broncos	2022
Matt Soper-Lawler	Souths Logan Magpies	2020
Enari Tuala	North Queensland Cowboys	2020

=== Losses ===
Player/Coach	Club
Mitch Andrews	Contract terminated
Nathan Brown (head coach)	Contract terminated
Jamie Buhrer	Retirement
Kiah Cooper	Western Suburbs Rosellas
Sale Finau	Sunbury United Rugby League
Jacob Gagai	South Sydney Rabbitohs
James Gavet	Huddersfield Giants
Slade Griffin	Retirement
Shaun Kenny-Dowall	Hull Kingston Rovers
Brayden Musgrove	Manly Warringah Sea Eagles
Jesse Ramien	Cronulla-Sutherland Sharks
Nathan Ross	Retirement
James Shepherd (assistant coach)	St. George Illawarra Dragons
Sam Stone	Gold Coast Titans
Kristian Woolf (assistant coach & interim head coach)	St Helens R.F.C.
Zac Woolford	Newtown Jets

=== Promoted juniors ===
Player	Junior side
Mitch Black	Knights Jersey Flegg Cup
Jack Cameron	Knights Jersey Flegg Cup
Zac Hosking	Knights Canterbury Cup NSW
Dylan Lucas	Knights Jersey Flegg Cup
Toby Marks	Knights Jersey Flegg Cup
Brandon Russell	Knights Jersey Flegg Cup
Bayden Searle	Knights Jersey Flegg Cup

=== Change of role ===
Player/Coach	New role
Scott Dureau (Jersey Flegg Cup coach)	Knights junior development
Tony Gleeson (Knights JFC assistant coach)	Knights Jersey Flegg Cup coach
Rory Kostjasyn (Canterbury Cup NSW coach)	Knights development coach

=== Re-signings ===
Player/Coach	Re-signed to
Mitchell Barnett	2023
Blake Green	2021
Hymel Hunt	2021
Brodie Jones	2021
Josh King	2021
Christian Ma'anaima	2023
Jirah Momoisea	2022
Kalyn Ponga	2024
Chris Randall	2021
Daniel Saifiti	2022
Jacob Saifiti	2022
Simi Sasagi	2022
Pasami Saulo	2022
Enari Tuala	2021
Connor Watson	2021

=== Player contract situations ===
2020 (left)	2021	2022	2023	2024
Jack Cameron	Mitch Black	Bradman Best	Mitchell Barnett	Kalyn Ponga
Matt Cooper	Mat Croker	Jayden Brailey	David Klemmer	
Herman Ese'ese	Phoenix Crossland	Jirah Momoisea		
Beau Fermor	Lachlan Fitzgibbon	Daniel Saifiti		
Tim Glasby	Blake Green	Jacob Saifiti		
Aidan Guerra	Zac Hosking	Simi Sasagi		
Danny Levi	Tex Hoy	Pasami Saulo		
Mason Lino	Hymel Hunt	Gehamat Shibasaki		
Toby Marks	Luke Huth			
Sione Mata'utia	Brodie Jones			
Andrew McCullough	Josh King			
Tautau Moga	Edrick Lee			
Tyronne Roberts-Davis	Dylan Lucas			
Brandon Russell	Kurt Mann			
Bayden Searle	Mitchell Pearce			
	Chris Randall			
	Matt Soper-Lawler			
	Starford To'a			
	Enari Tuala			
	Connor Watson			

== Ladder ==
2020 NRL season
Pos	Team	Pld	W	D	L	B	PF	PA	PD	Pts
1	Penrith Panthers	20	18	1	1	0	537	238	+299	37
2	Melbourne Storm (P)	20	16	0	4	0	534	276	+258	32
3	Parramatta Eels	20	15	0	5	0	392	288	+104	30
4	Sydney Roosters	20	14	0	6	0	552	322	+230	28
5	Canberra Raiders	20	14	0	6	0	445	317	+128	28
6	South Sydney Rabbitohs	20	12	0	8	0	521	352	+169	24
7	Newcastle Knights	20	11	1	8	0	421	374	+47	23
8	Cronulla-Sutherland Sharks	20	10	0	10	0	480	480	0	20
9	Gold Coast Titans	20	9	0	11	0	346	463	−117	18
10	New Zealand Warriors	20	8	0	12	0	343	458	−115	16
11	Wests Tigers	20	7	0	13	0	440	505	−65	14
12	St. George Illawarra Dragons	20	7	0	13	0	378	452	−74	14
13	Manly Warringah Sea Eagles	20	7	0	13	0	375	509	−134	14
14	North Queensland Cowboys	20	5	0	15	0	368	520	−152	10
15	Canterbury-Bankstown Bulldogs	20	3	0	17	0	282	504	−222	6
16	Brisbane Broncos	20	3	0	17	0	268	624	−356	6

== Milestones ==
- Round 1: Jayden Brailey made his debut for the club, after previously playing for the Cronulla-Sutherland Sharks.
- Round 1: Kalyn Ponga played his 50th career game.
- Round 1: Gehamat Shibasaki made his debut for the club, after previously playing for the Brisbane Broncos.
- Round 1: Enari Tuala made his debut for the club, after previously playing for the North Queensland Cowboys.
- Round 2: Enari Tuala scored his 1st try for the club.
- Round 3: Tex Hoy made his NRL debut for the club and kicked his 1st career goal.
- Round 3: Brodie Jones made his NRL debut for the club.
- Round 3: Chris Randall made his NRL debut for the club and set a new record for amount of tackles made by a player making their debut, with 71 tackles.
- Round 4: Andrew McCullough made his debut for the club, after previously playing for the Brisbane Broncos.
- Round 7: Tex Hoy scored his 1st career try.
- Round 7: Gehamat Shibasaki scored his 1st career try.
- Round 8: Andrew McCullough scored his 1st try for the club.
- Round 9: Herman Ese'ese played his 50th game for the club.
- Round 10: Aidan Guerra played his 200th career game.
- Round 11: Kalyn Ponga played his 50th game for the club.
- Round 12: Mitchell Pearce played his 50th game for the club.
- Round 13: Phoenix Crossland scored his 1st career try.
- Round 13: Blake Green made his debut for the club, after previously playing for the New Zealand Warriors.
- Round 14: Aidan Guerra played his 50th game for the club.
- Round 16: David Klemmer played his 150th career game.
- Round 17: Josh King scored his 1st career try.
- Finals Week 1: Aidan Guerra kicked his 1st career goal.

== Jerseys and sponsors ==
In 2020, the Knights' jerseys were made by O'Neills and their major sponsor was nib Health Funds.

2020 Home Jersey	2020 Away Jersey	2020 Indigenous Jersey	2020 NSW Mining Jersey

== Fixtures ==
=== NRL Nines ===
Squad: 1. Kurt Gidley 2. Jirah Momoisea 3. Hymel Hunt 4. Brodie Jones 5. Gehamat Shibasaki 6. Aidan Guerra (c) 7. Starford To'a 8. Jacob Saifiti 9. Pasami Saulo 10. Kurt Mann (c) 11. Tyronne Roberts-Davis 12. Mason Lino 13. Sione Mata'utia 14. Mitchell Barnett 15. Bayden Searle 16. Tex Hoy 17. Simi Sasagi 18. Matt Soper-Lawler

Date	Round	Opponent	Venue	Score	Tries	Drop Goal Conversions	Attendance
Friday, 14 February	Round 1	New Zealand Warriors	HBF Park	34–0	M.Lino, S.Mata'utia, T.Hoy, M.Soper-Lawler	M.Lino (4/4)	
Saturday, 15 February	Round 2	Penrith Panthers	HBF Park	16–4	S.Sasagi, J.Saifiti, T.Hoy	M.Lino (2/3)	
Saturday, 15 February	Quarter Finals	Parramatta Eels	HBF Park	7–14	T.Hoy	T.Roberts-Davis (1/1)	
Legend: Win Loss Draw

=== Pre-season Trials ===
Date	Opponent	Venue	Score	Tries	Conversions	Attendance
Saturday, 22 February	St. George Illawarra Dragons	Maitland Sportsground	12–38	C.Randall, L.Huth	M.Lino (1) T.Hoy (1)	
Saturday, 29 February	Sydney Roosters	Central Coast Stadium	58–0	M.Barnett, J.Brailey, K.Ponga, G.Shibasaki, H.Hunt, L.Fitzgibbon, C.Watson, S.Sasagi, T.Hoy, M.Barnett	K.Ponga (3), M.Lino (6)	
Legend: Win Loss Draw

=== Regular season ===
Date	Round	Opponent	Venue	Score	Tries	Conversions/Penalty	Attendance
Saturday 14 March	Round 1	New Zealand Warriors	Mcdonald Jones Stadium	20–0	D.Saifiti, E.Lee, K.Ponga	K.Ponga (4/5)	10,239
Sunday 22 March	Round 2	Wests Tigers	Leichhardt Oval	42–24	E.Tuala (2), M.Barnett, K.Mann, E.Lee, K.Ponga, M.Pearce, C.Watson	K.Ponga (5/9)	0 (closed event)
Saturday 28 March	Round 3 (Suspended)**	Cronulla Sharks	Netstrata Jubilee Stadium		Suspended		
Friday 3 April	Round 4 (Suspended)**	North Queensland Cowboys	Mcdonald Jones Stadium		Suspended		
Thursday 9 April	Round 5 (Suspended)**	Manly Sea Eagles	Lottoland		Suspended		
Saturday 18 April	Round 6 (Suspended)**	Canberra Raiders	~~McDonalds Park, Wagga Wagga~~ GIO Stadium*		Suspended		
Sunday 26 April	Round 7 (Suspended)**	Penrith Panthers	Mcdonald Jones Stadium		Suspended		
Saturday 2 May	Round 8 (Suspended)**	South Sydney Rabbitohs	Suncorp Stadium		Suspended		
Saturday 9 May	Round 9 (Suspended)**	St. George Illawarra Dragons	Mcdonald Jones Stadium		Suspended		
Thursday 14 May	Round 10 (Suspended)**	Sydney Roosters	Sydney Cricket Ground		Suspended		
Sunday 24 May	Round 11 (Suspended)**	Cronulla Sharks	Mcdonald Jones Stadium		Suspended		
Saturday 30 May	Round 12 (Suspended)**	South Sydney Rabbitohs	Mcdonald Jones Stadium		Suspended		
Sunday 7 June	Round 13 (Suspended)**	Penrith Panthers	Panthers Stadium		Suspended		
Saturday 13 June	Round 14 (Suspended)**	Melbourne Storm	Mcdonald Jones Stadium		Suspended		
Sunday 28 June	Round 15 (Suspended)**	Gold Coast Titans	Mcdonald Jones Stadium		Suspended		
	Round 16 (Suspended)**	Bye					
Sunday 12 July	Round 17 (Suspended)**	North Queensland Cowboys	Queensland Country Bank Stadium		Suspended		
Sunday 19 July	Round 18 (Suspended)**	Brisbane Broncos	Mcdonald Jones Stadium		Suspended		
Sunday 26 July	Round 19 (Suspended)**	Wests Tigers	Mcdonald Jones Stadium		Suspended		
Saturday 1 August	Round 20 (Suspended)**	Canterbury Bankstown Bulldogs	Bankwest Stadium		Suspended		
Sunday 9 August	Round 21 (Suspended)**	New Zealand Warriors	Mt Smart Stadium		Suspended		
Saturday 15 August	Round 22 (Suspended)**	Manly Sea Eagles	Mcdonald Jones Stadium		Suspended		
Saturday 22 August	Round 23 (Suspended)**	Brisbane Broncos	Suncorp Stadium		Suspended		
Friday 28 August	Round 24 (Suspended)**	Parramatta Eels	Bankwest Stadium		Suspended		
Sunday 6 September	Round 25 (Suspended)**	Canterbury Bankstown Bulldogs	Mcdonald Jones Stadium		Suspended		
Legend: Win Loss Draw Suspended

- From Round 2 the NRL announced matches would be played behind closed doors until further notice due to the COVID-19 (Coronavirus) situation
- * Match relocated to Canberra due to the COVID-19 (Coronavirus) situation
- ** Season suspended from Round 3 until further notice due to the COVID-19 (Coronavirus) situation

=== Updated Regular Season - 21 May 2020 ===
Date	Round	Opponent	Venue	Score	Tries	Conversions/Penalty	Attendance
Saturday 14 March	Round 1	New Zealand Warriors	Mcdonald Jones Stadium	20–0	D.Saifiti, E.Lee, K.Ponga	K.Ponga (4/5)	10,239
Sunday 22 March	Round 2	Wests Tigers	Leichhardt Oval	42–24	E.Tuala (2), M.Barnett, K.Mann, E.Lee, K.Ponga, M.Pearce, C.Watson	K.Ponga (5/9)	0 (closed event)
-	-	-	-	-	Season Suspended due to COVID-19 Pandemic	-	-
Sunday 31 May	Round 3	Penrith Panthers	Campbelltown Stadium	14–14	J.Saifiti, B.Best (2)	T.Hoy (1/3)	0 (closed event)
Sunday 7 June	Round 4	Canberra Raiders	Campbelltown Stadium	34–18	B.Best (2), K.Ponga, E.Lee (2), E.Tuala	K.Ponga (4/5), T.Hoy (1/1)	0 (closed event)
Saturday 13 June	Round 5	Melbourne Storm	Central Coast Stadium	12–26	B.Best, E.Lee	K.Ponga (2/3)	Not Counted
Thursday 18 June	Round 6	Brisbane Broncos	Central Coast Stadium	27–6	K.Mann, H.Hunt, D.Saifiti, M.Pearce	K.Ponga (5/5), M.Pearce (1/1 Field Goal)	167 *Restricted Capacity
Saturday 27 June	Round 7	North Queensland Cowboys	Queensland Country Bank Stadium	32–20	T.Hoy, H.Hunt, K.Mann, G.Shibasaki	K.Ponga (2/4)	1,853 *Restricted Capacity
Sunday 5 July	Round 8	Manly Sea Eagles	~~Central Coast Stadium~~ Lottoland	14–12	A.McCullough, K.Mann	K.Ponga (3/3)	2,271 *Restricted Capacity
Sunday 12 July	Round 9	Parramatta Eels	~~Central Coast Stadium~~ Mcdonald Jones Stadium	10–3	A.McCullough	K.Ponga (0/1)	6,980 *Restricted Capacity
Saturday 18 July	Round 10	South Sydney Rabbitohs	Bankwest Stadium	20–18	E.Tuala, K.Mann, K.Ponga, B.Best	K.Ponga (2/5)	4,249 *Restricted Capacity
Sunday 26 July	Round 11	Canterbury Bankstown Bulldogs	Mcdonald Jones Stadium	12–18	H.Hunt, S.Mata'utia	K.Ponga (2/2)	3,521 *Restricted Capacity
Sunday 2 August	Round 12	Melbourne Storm	~~Suncorp Stadium~~ Sunshine Coast Stadium	16–26	B.Best, A.Guerra, E.Tuala	K.Ponga (2/3)	5,437 *Restricted Capacity
Saturday 8 August	Round 13	Wests Tigers	Mcdonald Jones Stadium	44–3	K.Ponga (2), H.Hunt, S.To'a, J.Saifiti, H.Ese'ese, G.Shibasaki, P.Crossland	K.Ponga (6/9)	2,952* Restricted Capacity
Sunday 16 August	Round 14	Manly Sea Eagles	Mcdonald Jones Stadium	26–24	S.To'a, K.Mann, E.Tuala (2), H.Hunt	K.Ponga (3/5)	* Restricted Capacity
Sunday 23 August	Round 15	North Queensland Cowboys	Mcdonald Jones Stadium	12–0	H.Hunt, E.Tuala	K.Ponga (2/5)	5,304* Restricted Capacity
Saturday 29 August	Round 16	New Zealand Warriors	Scully Park	36–6	G.Shibasaki	K.Ponga (1/1)	* Restricted Capacity
Friday 4 September	Round 17	Cronulla Sharks	Mcdonald Jones Stadium	38–10	S.To'a (2), K.Ponga (3), L.Fitzgibbon, J.King	K.Ponga (0/2), M.Lino (5/6)	5,597* Restricted Capacity
Saturday 12 September	Round 18	Sydney Roosters	Sydney Cricket Ground	42–12	E.Tuala, G.Shibasaki	M.Lino (2/2)	* Restricted Capacity
Sunday 20 September	Round 19	St. George Illawarra Dragons	Mcdonald Jones Stadium	42–18	K.Ponga, G.Shibasaki, A.Guerra, D.Saifiti, E.Tuala (2), J.Saifiti	M.Lino (2/2)	6,659* Restricted Capacity
Friday 25 September	Round 20	Gold Coast Titans	Cbus Super Stadium	36–6	E.Lee	M.Lino (1/1)	9,877* Restricted Capacity
Legend: Win Loss Draw

== Finals series ==
Home	Score	Away	Match Information
Home	Score	Away	Date and Time (Local)	Venue	Referees	Crowd
QUALIFYING & ELIMINATION FINALS
South Sydney Rabbitohs	46–20	Newcastle Knights	4 October 2020, 4:05 pm	ANZ Stadium	B.Cummins	17,212* Restricted Capacity

Qualifying and elimination finals
2 Oct, Panthers Stadium
1	Penrith	29
4	Sydney	28
3 Oct, GIO Stadium Canberra
5	Canberra	32
8	Cronulla-Sutherland	20
4 Oct, ANZ Stadium
6	South Sydney	46
7	Newcastle	20
3 Oct, Suncorp Stadium
2	Melbourne	36
3	Parramatta	24

Semi-finals
9 Oct, Sydney Cricket Ground
Sydney	18
Canberra	22
10 Oct, Bankwest Stadium
Parramatta	24
South Sydney	38

Preliminary finals
17 Oct, ANZ Stadium
Penrith	20
South Sydney	16
16 Oct, Suncorp Stadium
Melbourne	30
Canberra	10

Grand final
25 Oct, ANZ Stadium
Penrith	20
Melbourne	26

== Statistics ==
Name	Appearances	Tries	Goals	Field goals	Points	Captain	Age
Mitchell Barnett	13	1	0	0	4	0	26
Bradman Best	11	8	0	0	32	0	19
Jayden Brailey	2	0	0	0	0	0	24
Phoenix Crossland	6	1	0	0	4	0	20
Herman Ese'ese	21	1	0	0	4	0	26
Lachlan Fitzgibbon	17	1	0	0	4	0	26
Tim Glasby	7	0	0	0	0	0	31
Blake Green	3	0	0	0	0	0	34
Aidan Guerra	21	2	1	0	10	0	32
Tex Hoy	9	1	2	0	8	0	21
Hymel Hunt	20	8	0	0	32	0	27
Brodie Jones	7	0	0	0	0	0	22
Josh King	7	1	0	0	4	0	25
David Klemmer	21	0	0	0	0	0	27
Edrick Lee	11	6	0	0	24	0	28
Mason Lino	5	0	15	0	30	0	26
Kurt Mann	20	6	0	0	24	0	27
Sione Mata'utia	12	1	0	0	4	0	24
Andrew McCullough	8	2	0	0	8	0	30
Tautau Moga	4	0	0	0	0	0	27
Mitchell Pearce	21	2	0	1	9	21	31
Kalyn Ponga	19	10	46	0	132	0	22
Chris Randall	7	0	0	0	0	0	25
Daniel Saifiti	14	3	0	0	12	0	24
Jacob Saifiti	21	3	0	0	12	0	24
Pasami Saulo	7	0	0	0	0	0	22
Gehamat Shibasaki	11	5	0	0	20	0	22
Starford To'a	7	4	0	0	16	0	20
Enari Tuala	20	11	0	0	44	0	22
Connor Watson	5	1	0	0	4	0	24
Totals	21	78	64	1	441	–	Average: 25

30 players used.

== Representative honours ==
The following players appeared in a representative match or were named in a representative squad in 2020.

Indigenous All Stars

- Connor Watson

Māori All Stars

- Kalyn Ponga
- Pasami Saulo

New South Wales extended 64-man squad

- David Klemmer (Senior squad)
- Mitchell Pearce (Senior squad)
- Jonah Pezet (Future Blues)
- Daniel Saifiti (Senior squad)

New South Wales

- Daniel Saifiti

Queensland

- Hymel Hunt (train-on squad)
- Edrick Lee
- Kalyn Ponga (train-on squad)

== Individual honours ==
=== Newcastle Knights awards ===
- Player of the Year: Kalyn Ponga
- Players' Player: Kalyn Ponga
- Gladiator of the Year Award: Kurt Mann
- Community Player of the Year: Connor Watson
- Rookie of the Year: Chris Randall
- Knight in Shining Armor: Mitchell Barnett
- Club Person of the Year: Luke Huth
