= 2020 North Queensland Cowboys season =

Coordinates: 27°27′53″S 153°0′34″E

- NRL Rank: 14th
- Play-off result: Missed finals
- 2020 record: Wins: 5; draws: 0; losses: 15
- Points scored: For: 368; against: 520

Team information
- CEO: Jeff Reibel
- Coach: Paul Green (resigned on July 20); Josh Hannay (interim)
- Captain: Michael Morgan
- Stadium: Queensland Country Bank Stadium
- Avg. attendance: 6,712
- High attendance: 22,459 (vs. Brisbane, Round 1)

Top scorers
- Tries: Kyle Feldt (19)
- Goals: Valentine Holmes (24)
- Points: Kyle Feldt (122)
← 2019	2021 →

The 2020 North Queensland Cowboys season was the 26th in the club's history. Coached by Paul Green and captained by Michael Morgan, they competed in the NRL's 2020 Telstra Premiership. The 2020 season was the club's first at their new home ground, Queensland Country Bank Stadium, after 25 seasons at Willows Sports Complex.

On 20 July, Green resigned as head coach after just three wins from the opening 10 games. He was replaced by assistant coach Josh Hannay, who took over as interim head coach until the end of the season.

== Season summary ==
=== Milestones ===
- Round 1: Valentine Holmes, Esan Marsters and Reece Robson made their debuts for the club.
- Round 1: Valentine Holmes scored his first try for the club.
- Round 2: The club played the Canterbury-Bankstown Bulldogs in the first match without fans in Australian first grade history.
- Round 3: Reece Robson scored his first try in the NRL.
- Round 4: Tom Gilbert made his NRL debut.
- Round 5: Hamiso Tabuai-Fidow made his NRL debut.
- Round 6: Connelly Lemuelu made his NRL debut.
- Round 6: Esan Marsters scored his first try for the club.
- Round 10: Daejarn Asi made his NRL debut.
- Round 10: Daejarn Asi scored his first NRL try.
- Round 11: Ben Hampton played his 100th NRL game.
- Round 13: Emry Pere made his NRL debut.
- Round 13: Francis Molo played his 50th NRL game.
- Round 14: Mitchell Dunn and Connelly Lemuelu scored their first NRL tries.
- Round 15: The club were held scoreless for the first time since Round 1, 2012.
- Round 19: Ben Condon made his NRL debut.

=== Squad ===
North Queensland Cowboys 2020 Squad
NRL squad			Coaching Staff
Daejarn Asi – CE, FB; John Asiata – LK, FE; Jake Clifford – HB, FE; Ben Condon – SR; Gavin Cooper – SR; Reuben Cotter – HK; Scott Drinkwater – FB, FE; Mitchell Dunn – SR; Kyle Feldt – WG; Tom Gilbert – LK, PR; Jake Granville – HK; Wiremu Greig – PR	Ben Hampton – CE, FB; Coen Hess – SR; Peter Hola – PR, LK; Valentine Holmes – FB, WG; Corey Jensen – PR, LK; Connelly Lemuelu – CE, FB; Esan Marsters – CE; Josh McGuire – PR, LK; Jordan McLean (vc) – PR; Francis Molo – PR; Michael Morgan (c) – HB, FE; Justin O'Neill – CE, WG	Tom Opacic – CE; Emry Pere – PR; Reece Robson – HK; Dan Russell – CE, SR; Tukimihia Simpkins – SR; Garrett Smith – PR; Hamiso Tabuai-Fidow – FB, WG; Murray Taulagi – WG, CE; Jason Taumalolo – LK, SR; Shane Wright – SR	Head coach: Josh Hannay (interim); Assistant coaches: Aaron Payne (assistant coach); David Tangata-Toa (assistant coach); Paul Bowman (head of sports science); Michael Dobbin (head of performance); Mark Henry (assistant strength & conditioning coach); Ashley Graham (elite pathways performance coach); Steve Sartori (physiotherapist); Legend: (c) Captain(s); (vc) Vice-captain(s); Updated: 24 November 2019; Source(s): NQ Cowboys

== Squad movement ==
=== Gains ===
Player	Signed from	Until end of	Notes
Valentine Holmes	New York Jets	2025	
Connelly Lemuelu	Canterbury Bulldogs	2021	
Esan Marsters	Wests Tigers	2022	
Reece Robson	St George Illawarra Dragons	2023	

=== Losses ===
Player	Signed To	Until end of	Notes
Carlin Anderson	Townsville Blackhawks	2020	
Kurt Baptiste	Easts Tigers	2020	
Logan Bayliss-Brow	Easts Tigers	2020	
Scott Bolton	Retired	–	
Javid Bowen	Northern Pride	2020	
Gideon Gela-Mosby	Northern Pride	2020	
Jordan Kahu	Brisbane Broncos	2020	
Te Maire Martin	Retired	–	
Matthew Scott	Retired	–	
Enari Tuala	Newcastle Knights	2020	
Kurt Wiltshire	Wests Tigers Mackay	2020	

=== Re-signings ===
Player	Club	Until end of	Notes
Reuben Cotter	North Queensland Cowboys	2022	
Mitchell Dunn	North Queensland Cowboys	2022	
Kyle Feldt	North Queensland Cowboys	2024	
Francis Molo	North Queensland Cowboys	2021	
Emry Pere	North Queensland Cowboys	2022	
Shane Wright	North Queensland Cowboys	2021	

== Ladder ==
2020 NRL season
Pos	Team	Pld	W	D	L	B	PF	PA	PD	Pts
1	Penrith Panthers	20	18	1	1	0	537	238	+299	37
2	Melbourne Storm (P)	20	16	0	4	0	534	276	+258	32
3	Parramatta Eels	20	15	0	5	0	392	288	+104	30
4	Sydney Roosters	20	14	0	6	0	552	322	+230	28
5	Canberra Raiders	20	14	0	6	0	445	317	+128	28
6	South Sydney Rabbitohs	20	12	0	8	0	521	352	+169	24
7	Newcastle Knights	20	11	1	8	0	421	374	+47	23
8	Cronulla-Sutherland Sharks	20	10	0	10	0	480	480	0	20
9	Gold Coast Titans	20	9	0	11	0	346	463	−117	18
10	New Zealand Warriors	20	8	0	12	0	343	458	−115	16
11	Wests Tigers	20	7	0	13	0	440	505	−65	14
12	St. George Illawarra Dragons	20	7	0	13	0	378	452	−74	14
13	Manly Warringah Sea Eagles	20	7	0	13	0	375	509	−134	14
14	North Queensland Cowboys	20	5	0	15	0	368	520	−152	10
15	Canterbury-Bankstown Bulldogs	20	3	0	17	0	282	504	−222	6
16	Brisbane Broncos	20	3	0	17	0	268	624	−356	6

== Fixtures ==
=== NRL Nines ===
The NRL Nines is a pre-season rugby league nines competition featuring all 16 NRL clubs. The 2020 competition was played over two days on February 14 and 15 at HBF Park in Perth. The Cowboys finished first in Pool 4 and defeated the South Sydney Rabbitohs, Gold Coast Titans and St George Illawarra Dragons on their way to winning the competition.

==== Pool Play ====
Pool 4
Team	Pld	W	D	L	PF	PA	PD	Pts
North Queensland Cowboys	2	2	0	0	27	18	+9	4
Manly Warringah Sea Eagles	2	1	0	1	25	14	+11	2
Brisbane Broncos	2	1	0	1	23	25	−2	2
Melbourne Storm	2	0	0	2	12	30	−18	0

Date	Time (Local)	Round	Opponent	Venue	Score	Tries	Goals
Saturday, 14 February	7:05 pm	Round 1	Brisbane Broncos	HBF Park	17 – 11	Drinkwater (bonus try), Hess, Tabuai-Fidow	Clifford (2)
Sunday, 15 Saturday	1:45 pm	Round 2	Manly Sea Eagles	HBF Park	10 – 7	Opacic, Taulagi	Drinkwater (1)
Legend: Win Loss

==== Finals ====
Quarter-finals
Newcastle Knights	7
Parramatta Eels	14
St. George Illawarra Dragons	17
Penrith Panthers	14
Gold Coast Titans	24
Manly Warringah Sea Eagles	0
North Queensland Cowboys	20
South Sydney Rabbitohs	6

Semi-finals
Parramatta Eels	6
St. George Illawarra Dragons	8
Gold Coast Titans	10
North Queensland Cowboys	19

Final
St. George Illawarra Dragons	14
North Queensland Cowboys	23

Date	Time (Local)	Round	Opponent	Venue	Score	Tries	Goals
Sunday, 15 Saturday	3:55 pm	Quarter	South Sydney Rabbitohs	HBF Park	20 – 6	Drinkwater (bonus try), Hess (bonus try), Tabuai-Fidow	Clifford (2), Feldt (1)
Sunday, 15 Saturday	5:45 pm	Semi	Gold Coast Titans	HBF Park	19 – 8	Feldt (bonus try), Drinkwater, Tabuai-Fidow, Wright	Feldt (1)
Sunday, 15 Saturday	7:00 pm	Final	St George Illawarra Dragons	HBF Park	23 – 14	Robson (bonus try), Clifford, Hess, Tabuai-Fidow	Clifford (2), Drinkwater (1)
Legend: Win Loss

=== Pre-season ===
Date	Round	Opponent	Venue	Score	Tries	Goals	Attendance
Saturday, 22 February	Trial 1	Brisbane Broncos	Barlow Park	18 – 16	Cotter (2), Gilbert, Lemuelu	Clifford (1/4)	–
Saturday, 29 February	Trial 2	Melbourne Storm	Casey Fields	14 – 22	Feldt, Holmes, O'Neill	Holmes (1/3)	–
Legend: Win Loss Draw Bye

=== Regular season ===
Due to the COVID-19 pandemic in Australia, the regular season was suspended after Round 2. On 9 April, the NRL announced that competition would re-commence on 28 May with a shortened 20-round regular season. On 21 May, the full revised draw was released From Round 7 onward, the Cowboys were allowed to host fans at their home games, starting with a limit of 2,000, before eventually rising to 10,000 from Round 9.

Date	Round	Opponent	Venue	Score	Tries	Goals	Attendance
Friday, 13 March	Round 1	Brisbane Broncos	Queensland Country Bank Stadium	21 – 28	Cooper, Feldt, Hampton, Holmes	Feldt (2/2), Holmes (0/2), Morgan (1 FG)	22,459
Thursday, 19 March	Round 2	Canterbury Bulldogs	ANZ Stadium	24 – 16	Drinkwater, Hampton, Hess, Taumalolo	Holmes (4/5)	0
Friday, 29 May	Round 3	Gold Coast Titans	Queensland Country Bank Stadium	36 – 6	Hampton (2), Robson (2), Feldt, O'Neill	Holmes (6/7)	0
Saturday, 6 June	Round 4	Cronulla Sharks	Queensland Country Bank Stadium	16 – 26	Feldt (2), O'Neill	Holmes (2/3)	0
Friday, 12 June	Round 5	Warriors	Central Coast Stadium	26 – 37	Feldt (2), Holmes, Molo, O'Neill	Feldt (3/5)	0
Saturday, 20 June	Round 6	Wests Tigers	Campbelltown Stadium	36 – 20	Feldt (2), Drinkwater, Marsters	Clifford (1/2), Feldt (1/3)	0
Saturday, 27 June	Round 7	Newcastle Knights	Queensland Country Bank Stadium	32 – 20	Clifford, Feldt, Hess, O'Neill, Tabuai-Fidow	Feldt (6/6)	1,853
Friday, 3 July	Round 8	Parramatta Eels	Bankwest Stadium	4 – 42	Opacic	Feldt (0/1)	6,730
Thursday, 9 July	Round 9	Sydney Roosters	Queensland Country Bank Stadium	16 – 42	Robson (2), Hess	Feldt (2/4)	6,478
Sunday, 19 July	Round 10	Penrith Panthers	Panthers Stadium	10 – 22	Asi, Tabuai-Fidow	Feldt (1/2)	2,891
Friday, 24 July	Round 11	Manly Sea Eagles	Queensland Country Bank Stadium	12 – 24	Feldt, Molo	Feldt (2/2)	7,127
Saturday, 1 August	Round 12	Canberra Raiders	Queensland Country Bank Stadium	12 – 14	Robson, Taumalolo	Feldt (2/2)	7,586
Sunday, 9 August	Round 13	Gold Coast Titans	Cbus Super Stadium	10 – 30	Feldt, O'Neill	Feldt (1/2)	5,646
Saturday, 15 August	Round 14	South Sydney Rabbitohs	Queensland Country Bank Stadium	30 – 31	Morgan (2), Dunn, Lemuelu, Opacic, Tabuai-Fidow	Feldt (3/7)	7,611
Sunday, 23 August	Round 15	Newcastle Knights	McDonald Jones Stadium	0 – 14			5,304
Saturday, 29 August	Round 16	Cronulla Sharks	Netstrata Jubilee Stadium	12 – 28	Feldt (2)	Holmes (2/2)	2,717
Sunday, 6 September	Round 17	St George Illawarra Dragons	Queensland Country Bank Stadium	23 – 22	Clifford, Feldt, Holmes, Molo	Holmes (3/4, 1 FG)	6,755
Sunday, 13 September	Round 18	Melbourne Storm	Sunshine Coast Stadium	20 – 36	Feldt, Holmes, Marsters, Tabuai-Fidow	Holmes (2/4)	4,056
Friday, 18 September	Round 19	Penrith Panthers	Queensland Country Bank Stadium	12 – 32	Feldt, Tabuai-Fidow	Holmes (2/2)	7,247
Thursday, 24 September	Round 20	Brisbane Broncos	Suncorp Stadium	32 – 16	Feldt (3), Clifford, O'Neill, Tabuai-Fidow	Holmes (3/5), Cooper (1/1)	17,174
Legend: Win Loss Draw Bye

== Statistics ==
Name	App	T	G	FG	Pts
Daejarn Asi	5	1	-	-	4
John Asiata	11	-	-	-	-
Jake Clifford	14	3	1	-	20
Ben Condon	1	-	-	-	-
Gavin Cooper	15	1	1	-	6
Reuben Cotter	10	-	-	-	-
Scott Drinkwater	16	2	-	-	8
Mitchell Dunn	17	1	-	-	4
Kyle Feldt	20	19	23	-	122
Tom Gilbert	12	-	-	-	-
Jake Granville	8	-	-	-	-
Ben Hampton	13	4	-	-	16
Coen Hess	15	3	-	-	12
Peter Hola	4	-	-	-	-
Valentine Holmes	12	4	24	1	65
Corey Jensen	8	-	-	-	-
Connelly Lemuelu	7	1	-	-	4
Esan Marsters	12	2	-	-	8
Josh McGuire	17	-	-	-	-
Jordan McLean	15	-	-	-	-
Francis Molo	20	3	-	-	12
Michael Morgan	6	2	-	1	9
Justin O'Neill	17	6	-	-	24
Tom Opacic	5	2	-	-	8
Emry Pere	2	-	-	-	-
Reece Robson	14	5	-	-	20
Hamiso Tabuai-Fidow	14	6	-	-	24
Murray Taulagi	4	-	-	-	-
Jason Taumalolo	16	2	-	-	8
Shane Wright	8	-	-	-	-
Totals		67	49	2	368

== Representatives ==
The following players have played a representative match in 2020.

	All Stars match	State of Origin 1	State of Origin 2	State of Origin 3
Coen Hess	–	Queensland	–	–
Valentine Holmes	–	–	Queensland	Queensland
Esan Marsters	Māori All Stars	–	–	–

== Honours ==
=== Club ===
- Paul Bowman Medal: Jason Taumalolo
- Players' Player: Josh McGuire
- Coach's Award: Mitchell Dunn
- Member's Player of the Year: Kyle Feldt
- Club Person of the Year: John Asiata
- Rookie of the Year: Hamiso Tabuai-Fidow

== Feeder Clubs ==
=== Queensland Cup ===
The Cowboys' three feeder clubs, the Mackay Cutters, Northern Pride and Townsville Blackhawks, each played just one game before the 2020 Queensland Cup season was postponed and later cancelled due to the COVID-19 pandemic.

== Women's team ==
=== QRL Women's Premiership ===
The Cowboys' women's team, the North Queensland Gold Stars, played just one game in the QRL Women's Premiership before the season was postponed and later cancelled due to the COVID-19 pandemic.
