= 2020 Penrith Panthers season =

- NRL Rank: 1st (Minor Premiers)
- 2020 record: Wins: 18; draws: 1; losses: 1
- Points scored: For: 537; against: 238

Team information
- CEO: Brian Fletcher
- Coach: Ivan Cleary
- Captain: James Tamou
- Stadium: Panthers Stadium – 22,500; Carrington Park – 13,000 (Cancelled)
- Avg. attendance: 3,164
- High attendance: 10,160

Top scorers
- Tries: Stephen Crichton (17)
- Goals: Nathan Cleary (86)
- Points: Nathan Cleary (208)
← 2019	List of seasons	2021 →

The 2020 Penrith Panthers season is the 54th season in the club's history. Coached by Ivan Cleary and captained by James Tamou, the Panthers are competing in the National Rugby League's 2020 Telstra Premiership. Due to the COVID-19 pandemic the NRL was played without fans in round 2. Shortly after the competition was suspended from 24 March until 28 May when round 3 commenced under a new draw. Crowds were allowed to return from round 5 in very small groups, whilst larger crowds were allowed from round 8. Teams were also allowed to return to their own home grounds from round 8. On the 14th of August after winning against the New Zealand Warriors, Penrith broke the club record for their longest ever winning streak with their run of 9 straight wins, continuing to 14 straight wins on the 19th of September against the North Queensland Cowboys. After Penriths 32 - 12 victory over the Cowboys in round 19, the club were crowned minor premiers of the 2020 NRL season for a third time in the clubs history. After winning by 1 point against the Sydney Roosters in the first week of the 2020 NRL Finals Series Penrith made the Preliminary final for the first time in 6 years, extending their winning streak to 16 straight. In the Preliminary final Penrith went on to win 20 - 16 against the South Sydney Rabbitohs and made their first grand final in 17 years. Penrith also extended their winning streak to 17 which is the equal highest winning streak in the NRL era alongside the Canterbury Bankstown Bulldogs. In the grand final the Panthers played the second place Melbourne Storm but came off second best. After being down 26 - 0 after 50 minutes they managed to score 20 unanswered points, finishing the match fast but falling short in the end, losing 20 - 26.

== Squad ==
Penrith Panthers 2020 Squad
Top 30 Squad - 2020 Season			Development Players	Coaching Staff
Caleb Aekins – FB; Billy Burns – SR; Matt Burton (gk) – FE, HB; Kurt Capewell – SR, CE; Nathan Cleary (gk) – HB; Stephen Crichton (gk) – CE; Dylan Edwards – FB; James Fisher-Harris – PR, LK, SR; Jack Hetherington – PR, LK; Mitch Kenny – HK, LK	Viliame Kikau – SR; Apisai Koroisau (gk) – HK; Spencer Leniu – PR; Moses Leota – PR; Jarome Luai (gk) – FE, HB; Josh Mansour – WG; Liam Martin – SR, LK; Tyrone May – FE, LK, CE, HK; Brayden McGrady – CE; Brent Naden – CE, WG	Lindsay Smith – PR; James Tamou – PR (c); Zane Tetevano – PR; Brian To'o – WG; Malakai Watene-Zelezniak – WG, CE; Dean Whare – CE; Isaah Yeo – LK, SR (vc)	Shannon Harris – CE, SR; Patrick Hollis – SR; J'maine Hopgood – LK, SR; Daine Laurie – FB, FE; Glenn McGrady – FB; Charlie Staines – FB, WG	Head coach: Ivan Cleary; Assistant coaches: Trent Barrett; Cameron Ciraldo; Peter Wallace (ISP NSW coach); Guy Missio (Jersey Flegg coach); Hayden Knowles (head of performance); Legend: (c) Captain(s); (vc) Vice-captain(s); Updated: 14 August 2020; Source(s): Panthers Team Profiles

=== Player transfers ===
A † denotes that the transfer occurred during the 2019 season.

Gains
Player	Signed from	Until end of	Notes
Apisai Koroisau	Manly-Warringah Sea Eagles	2022	
Kurt Capewell	Cronulla Sharks	2021	
Zane Tetevano	Sydney Roosters	2022	

Losses
Player	Signed To	Until end of	Notes
Reagan Campbell-Gillard	Parramatta Eels	2024	
Wayde Egan	New Zealand Warriors	2022	
Tyrell Fuimaono	St. George Illawarra Dragons		
Tim Grant	Contract Terminated		
Sam McKendry	Retired		
James Maloney	Catalans Dragons		
Hame Sele	South Sydney Rabbitohs		
Frank Winterstein	Toulouse Olympique		
Sione Katoa	Canterbury Bankstown Bulldogs		
Nick Lui Toso	Northern Pride (Queensland Cup)		
Paea Pua	Mount Pritchard Mounties (NSW Cup)		

== Fixtures ==
=== Pre-season ===
Date	Trial	Opponent	Venue	Score	Tries	Goals
Saturday, 22 February	1	Wests Tigers	Panthers Stadium	32 - 4	Naden, May, Hetherington, Crichton, Hopgood	Cartwright (4/5)
Saturday, 29 February	2	Parramatta Eels	Bega recreation ground	22 - 22	Cleary, Mansour, Brian To'o, Naden, Hands	Cleary (2/3), Cartwright (1/1)
Legend: Win Loss Draw

=== Regular season ===
Date	Round	Opponent	Venue	Score	Tries	Goals	Attendance
Saturday, 14 March	1	Sydney Roosters	Panthers Stadium	20 - 14	Naden, Crichton, Kikau	Cleary (4/4)	10,160
Friday, 20 March	2	St George Illawarra Dragons	Netstrata Jubilee Stadium	28 - 32	Koroisau, Cleary, Naden, Kikau, Crichton	Cleary (5/5)	0
Sunday, 31 May	3	Newcastle Knights	Campbelltown Stadium	14 - 14	Kikau, Capewell	Crichton (3/3)	0
Friday, 5 June	4	New Zealand Warriors	Campbelltown Stadium	26 - 0	Burton (2), Luai, Mansour, Burns	Chricton (3/5)	0
Friday, 12 June	5	Parramatta Eels	Bankwest Stadium	16 - 10	To'o, Mansour	Cleary (1/2)	507
Friday, 19 June	6	Melbourne Storm	Campbelltown Stadium	21 - 14	Crichton, To'o, Kikau	Cleary (4/4, 1 FG)	115
Thursday, 25 June	7	South Sydney Rabbitohs	Netstrata Jubilee Stadium	20 - 12	Naden, Crichton, Edwards, Cleary	Cleary (1/4)	106
Saturday, 4 July	8	Wests Tigers	Bankwest Stadium	12 - 19	Crichton (2), Edwards	Cleary (3/3, 1 FG)	3,960
Saturday, 11 July	9	Cronulla Sharks	Netstrata Jubilee Stadium	24 - 56	Naden, Martin, Crichton (2), Staines (4), Burns	Cleary (7/9), Crichton (1/2)	3,277
Sunday, 19 July	10	North Queensland Cowboys	Panthers Stadium	22 - 10	Luai, Naden, Crichton, Cleary	Cleary (3/5)	2,891
Sunday, 26 July	11	Gold Coast Titans	Cbus Super Stadium	14 - 22	Mansour, Crichton, Yeo, Watene-Zelezniak	Cleary (3/4)	5,095
Saturday, 1 August	12	Manly-Warringah Sea Eagles	Lottoland	12 - 42	Staines (2), Yeo, Crichton, Cleary, Naden, Koroisau	Cleary (7/8)	2,729
Saturday, 8 August	13	Canberra Raiders	Panthers Stadium	28 - 12	Kikau, Martin, Crichton, Naden	Cleary (6/6)	3,468
Friday, 14 August	14	New Zealand Warriors	Central Coast Stadium	12 - 18	Naden, Koroisau, Edwards	Cleary (3/4)	2,737
Friday, 21 August	15	Cronulla Sharks	Panthers Stadium	38 - 12	Kikau, Mansour (2), Naden, Crichton, Martin, Luai	Cleary (5/7)	3,206
Saturday, 29 August	16	Wests Tigers	Panthers Stadium	30 - 6	Luai, Martin, To'o, Crichton, Mansour	Cleary (5/6)	3,699
Thursday, 3 September	17	Brisbane Broncos	Suncorp Stadium	12 - 25	Mansour, Capewell, Luai, To'o	Cleary (4/5, 1 FG)	5,626
Friday, 11 September	18	Parramatta Eels	Panthers Stadium	20 - 2	Mansour, Martin, Jarome Luai	Cleary (4/4)	3,955
Friday, 18 September	19	North Queensland Cowboys	Queensland Country Bank Stadium	12 - 32	To'o, Crichton, Mansour, Luai, Kikau, Naden	Cleary (4/6)	7,247
Saturday, 26 September	20	Canterbury-Bankstown Bulldogs	ANZ Stadium	0 - 42	To'o, Capewell (2), Naden (2), Mansour, Burton, Tamou	Cleary (5/8)	6,755
Legend: Win Loss Draw Bye

- NA = Not announced

=== Finals ===
Qualifying and elimination finals
2 Oct, Panthers Stadium
1	Penrith	29
4	Sydney	28
3 Oct, GIO Stadium Canberra
5	Canberra	32
8	Cronulla-Sutherland	20
4 Oct, ANZ Stadium
6	South Sydney	46
7	Newcastle	20
3 Oct, Suncorp Stadium
2	Melbourne	36
3	Parramatta	24

Semi-finals
9 Oct, Sydney Cricket Ground
Sydney	18
Canberra	22
10 Oct, Bankwest Stadium
Parramatta	24
South Sydney	38

Preliminary finals
17 Oct, ANZ Stadium
Penrith	20
South Sydney	16
16 Oct, Suncorp Stadium
Melbourne	30
Canberra	10

Grand final
25 Oct, ANZ Stadium
Penrith	20
Melbourne	26

Date	Round	Opponent	Venue	Score	Tries	Goals	Attendance
Friday, 2 October	Qualifying Final	Sydney Roosters	Panthers Stadium	29 - 28	Mansour, Cleary (3), Crichton	Cleary (4/6, 1 FG)	7,209
Saturday, 17 October	Preliminary Final	South Sydney Rabbitohs	ANZ Stadium	20 - 16	To'o, May, Edwards	Cleary (4/4)	30,116
Sunday, 25 October	Grand Final	Melbourne Storm	ANZ Stadium	20 - 26	To'o, Crichton, Mansour, Cleary	Cleary (2/3)	37,303
Legend: Win Loss Draw Bye

== Ladder ==
2020 NRL season
Pos	Team	Pld	W	D	L	B	PF	PA	PD	Pts
1	Penrith Panthers	20	18	1	1	0	537	238	+299	37
2	Melbourne Storm (P)	20	16	0	4	0	534	276	+258	32
3	Parramatta Eels	20	15	0	5	0	392	288	+104	30
4	Sydney Roosters	20	14	0	6	0	552	322	+230	28
5	Canberra Raiders	20	14	0	6	0	445	317	+128	28
6	South Sydney Rabbitohs	20	12	0	8	0	521	352	+169	24
7	Newcastle Knights	20	11	1	8	0	421	374	+47	23
8	Cronulla-Sutherland Sharks	20	10	0	10	0	480	480	0	20
9	Gold Coast Titans	20	9	0	11	0	346	463	−117	18
10	New Zealand Warriors	20	8	0	12	0	343	458	−115	16
11	Wests Tigers	20	7	0	13	0	440	505	−65	14
12	St. George Illawarra Dragons	20	7	0	13	0	378	452	−74	14
13	Manly Warringah Sea Eagles	20	7	0	13	0	375	509	−134	14
14	North Queensland Cowboys	20	5	0	15	0	368	520	−152	10
15	Canterbury-Bankstown Bulldogs	20	3	0	17	0	282	504	−222	6
16	Brisbane Broncos	20	3	0	17	0	268	624	−356	6

== Other teams ==
In addition to competing in the National Rugby League, the Panthers are also fielding semi-professional teams in the 2020 Jersey Flegg Cup (for players aged under 20) and the New South Wales Rugby League's 2020 Canterbury Cup (NSW Cup). Due to COVID-19 however these competitions were abandoned for the 2020 season.

== Representative honours ==
=== Domestic ===
Pos.	Player	Team	Call-up	Ref.
HB	Nathan Cleary	New South Wales	2020 State of Origin	
FE	Jarome Luai	New South Wales	2020 State of Origin	
LK	Isaah Yeo	New South Wales	2020 State of Origin	
CE	Stephen Crichton	New South Wales	2020 State of Origin	
SR	Kurt Capewell	Queensland	2020 State of Origin	
