= 2020 Canterbury-Bankstown Bulldogs season =

- 2020 season
- CEO: Andrew Hill
- Head coach: Dean Pay (Rounds 1-9); Steve Georgallis (Rounds 10-20)
- Captain: Josh Jackson
- Harvey Norman Women's Premiership: Pld: 2- W: 1, L:1
- Canterbury Cup NSW: Competition cancelled for 2020
- Top try scorer: Club: Nick Meaney (6); Raymond Faitala-Mariner (6)
- Top points scorer: Club: Nick Meaney (68)

The 2020 Canterbury-Bankstown Bulldogs season was the 86th in the club's history. They were competing in the National Rugby League's 2020 Telstra Premiership. Dean Pay was the coach from Round 1 to Round 9. He formally resigned from this position on 14 July 2020 was replaced by Steve Georgallis, who was named as Pay's interim replacement. It was reported that, following Pay's resignation and Georgallis's appointment, the clubs other Assistant Coach, Steve Antonelli also resigned from his position. In Round 2 the NRL announced a shortened Season from 26 rounds to 20.

== Fixtures ==
=== Regular season ===
Round	Home	Score	Away	Match Information
Round	Home	Score	Away	Date and Time	Venue	Crowd
1	Parramatta Eels	8 - 2	Canterbury Bankstown Bulldogs	Thur 12 Mar, 8:05pm AEDT	Bankwest Stadium	21,363
2	Canterbury Bankstown Bulldogs	16 - 24	North Queensland Cowboys	Thur 19 Mar 8:05pm AEDT	ANZ Stadium	0*
			COMPETITION SUSPENDED DUE TO COVID-19 PANDEMIC
3	Manly-Warringah Sea Eagles	32 - 6	Canterbury Bankstown Bulldogs	Sun 31 May, 6:30pm AEST	Central Coast Stadium	0*
4	Canterbury Bankstown Bulldogs	22 - 2	St George Illawarra Dragons	Mon 8 Jun, 4:05pm AEST	Bankwest Stadium	0*
5	Canterbury Bankstown Bulldogs	6 - 42	Sydney Roosters	Mon 15 Jun, 7:00pm AEST	Bankwest Stadium	366**
6	Cronulla Sutherland Sharks	20 - 18	Canterbury Bankstown Bulldogs	Sun 21 Jun, 6:30pm AEST	Bankwest Stadium	410**
7	Canterbury-Bankstown Bulldogs	6 - 34	Wests Tigers	Sun 28 Jun, 6:30pm AEST	Bankwest Stadium	519**
8	Canterbury-Bankstown Bulldogs	10 - 26	South Sydney Rabbitohs	Sun 5 Jul, 6:30pm AEST	Bankwest Stadium	3,585**
9	Brisbane Broncos	8 - 26	Canterbury Bankstown Bulldogs	Sat 11 Jul, 5:30pm AEST	Suncorp Stadium	7,134**
10	St George Illawarra Dragons	28 - 22	Canterbury Bankstown Bulldogs	Sat 18 Jul, 3:00pm AEST	WIN Stadium	1,619**
11	Newcastle Knights	12-18	Canterbury Bankstown Bulldogs	Sun 26 Jul, 2:00pm AEST	McDonald Jones Stadium	3,521**
12	Canterbury Bankstown Bulldogs	16-18	Parramatta Eels	Sun 2 Aug, 2:00pm AEST	ANZ Stadium	5,775**
13	Melbourne Storm	41-10	Canterbury Bankstown Bulldogs	Sun 8 Aug, 3:00pm AEST	Sunshine Coast Stadium	3,432**
14	Wests Tigers	29-28	Canterbury Bankstown Bulldogs	Sun 16 Aug, 4:05pm AEST	Bankwest Stadium	2,758**
15	Canterbury-Bankstown Bulldogs	14-20	New Zealand Warriors	Sun 23 Aug, 2:00pm AEST	ANZ Stadium	2,631**
16	Canberra Raiders	34-20	Canterbury Bankstown Bulldogs	Sun 30 Aug, 6:30pm AEST	Gio Stadium	2,685**
17	Canterbury Bankstown Bulldogs	14-18	Gold Coast Titans	Sat 5 Sep, 3:00pm AEST	ANZ Stadium	2,048**
18	Canterbury Bankstown Bulldogs	20-32	Manly-Warringah Sea Eagles	Fri 11 Sep, 6:00pm AEST	ANZ Stadium	2,151**
19	South Sydney Rabbitohs	16-26	Canterbury Bankstown Bulldogs	Thur 17 Sep, 7:50pm AEST	ANZ Stadium	4,859**
20	Canterbury Bankstown Bulldogs	0-42	Penrith Panthers	Sat 26 Sep, 3:00pm AEST	ANZ Stadium	6,755**
Legend: Win Loss Draw Bye

- Matches from round 2 - 4 were played without crowds as part of the Australian Government's efforts to limit the spread of the COVID-19 virus.
- Limited crowd attendance on matches from round 5 were allowed after the Australian government eased its COVID-19 restrictions.

== Ladder ==
2020 NRL season
Pos	Team	Pld	W	D	L	B	PF	PA	PD	Pts
1	Penrith Panthers	20	18	1	1	0	537	238	+299	37
2	Melbourne Storm (P)	20	16	0	4	0	534	276	+258	32
3	Parramatta Eels	20	15	0	5	0	392	288	+104	30
4	Sydney Roosters	20	14	0	6	0	552	322	+230	28
5	Canberra Raiders	20	14	0	6	0	445	317	+128	28
6	South Sydney Rabbitohs	20	12	0	8	0	521	352	+169	24
7	Newcastle Knights	20	11	1	8	0	421	374	+47	23
8	Cronulla-Sutherland Sharks	20	10	0	10	0	480	480	0	20
9	Gold Coast Titans	20	9	0	11	0	346	463	−117	18
10	New Zealand Warriors	20	8	0	12	0	343	458	−115	16
11	Wests Tigers	20	7	0	13	0	440	505	−65	14
12	St. George Illawarra Dragons	20	7	0	13	0	378	452	−74	14
13	Manly Warringah Sea Eagles	20	7	0	13	0	375	509	−134	14
14	North Queensland Cowboys	20	5	0	15	0	368	520	−152	10
15	Canterbury-Bankstown Bulldogs	20	3	0	17	0	282	504	−222	6
16	Brisbane Broncos	20	3	0	17	0	268	624	−356	6

== See also ==
- List of Canterbury-Bankstown Bulldogs seasons
