= 2021 Newcastle Knights season =

- NRL Rank: 7th
- Play-off result: Elimination Finalists (Week 1)
- 2021 record: Wins: 12; draws: 0; losses: 12
- Points scored: For: 428; against: 571

Team information
- CEO: Phil Gardner
- Coach: Adam O'Brien
- Captain: Jayden Brailey, Kalyn Ponga & Daniel Saifiti
- Stadium: McDonald Jones Stadium
- Avg. attendance: 17,636
- High attendance: 23,015

Top scorers
- Tries: Enari Tuala (13)
- Goals: Jake Clifford (33)
- Points: Jake Clifford (74)
← 2020	2022 →

The 2021 Newcastle Knights season was the 34th in the club's history. Coached by Adam O'Brien and co-captained by Jayden Brailey, Kalyn Ponga and Daniel Saifiti, they competed in the NRL's 2021 Telstra Premiership. In July, the NRL relocated the competition to Queensland to avoid an outbreak of the Deltra variant COVID-19 virus in New South Wales. The Knights finished the regular season in 7th place (out of 16), thus reaching the finals but were knocked out after losing to the Parramatta Eels in week 1.

== Squad ==
Newcastle Knights 2021 squad
2021 NRL top 30 squad			Development players	Coaching staff
261 Lachlan Fitzgibbon – SR; 268 Daniel Saifiti (c) – PR; 269 Jacob Saifiti – PR, SR; 273 Josh King – PR, LK; 276 Mitchell Barnett – SR, FE (gk); 295 Mitchell Pearce – HB; 296 Kalyn Ponga (c) – FB (gk); 297 Connor Watson – LK, FE, FB; 300 Pasami Saulo – PR; 304 Hymel Hunt – WG	305 David Klemmer – PR, LK; 306 Edrick Lee – WG; 307 Kurt Mann – FE, HB, FB, WG; 310 Phoenix Crossland – HB, FE (gk); 311 Bradman Best – CE; 312 Starford To'a – WG; 313 Jayden Brailey (c) – HK; 314 Gehamat Shibasaki – WG; 315 Enari Tuala – CE, WG; 316 Tex Hoy – FB (gk)	318 Brodie Jones – SR, CE; 320 Blake Green – HB (mid-season retirement); 321 Tyson Frizell – SR; 322 Sauaso Sue – LK; 323 Dom Young – WG, CE; 324 Brayden Musgrove – WG; 325 Simi Sasagi – CE; 326 Jake Clifford – FE, HB (gk) (mid-season signing); 329 Jirah Momoisea – PR; 000 Bailey Hodgson – FB	317 Chris Randall – LK; 328 Jack Johns – SR, CE; Jacob Kiraz – CE; Christian Ma'anaima – PR; Garrett Smith – PR; Extended squad players: 327 Mat Croker – PR; McKenzie Baker – FB; Mitch Black – HK; Zane Camroux – FE; Tyler Coburn – SR (pre-season training experience); Harry Croker – SR; Zac Hosking – LK; Cooper Jenkins – SR; Blake Lenehan – LK (pre-season training experience); Dylan Lucas – CE; Jaron Purcell – LK; Matt Soper-Lawler – WG; Daniel Ticehurst – PR; Chris Vea'ila – FB	Head coach: Adam O'Brien; Assistant coaches: Rory Kostjasyn; Willie Peters; Eric Smith; Andrew Ryan - NSW Cup coach; Legend: (c) Captain(s); (vc) Vice-captain(s); Updated: 9 November 2021; Source(s): Newcastle Knights Profiles, Rugby League Project

== Transfers and Re-signings ==
=== Gains ===
Player/Coach	Previous club	Length	Source
McKenzie Baker	Sydney Roosters	2021	
Zane Camroux	Wests Tigers	2021	
Tyler Coburn	Ipswich Jets	Pre-season	
Jake Clifford	North Queensland Cowboys	2023	
Tyson Frizell	St. George Illawarra Dragons	2023	
Bailey Hodgson	Castleford Tigers	2023	
Jack Johns	South Sydney Rabbitohs	2021	
Jacob Kiraz	North Queensland Cowboys	2021	
Blake Lenehan	Ipswich Jets	Pre-season	
Brayden Musgrove	Cessnock Goannas	2022	
Andrew Ryan (NSW Cup coach)	South Newcastle Lions	2021	
Garrett Smith	North Queensland Cowboys	2021	
Sauaso Sue	Canterbury-Bankstown Bulldogs	2022	
Dom Young	Huddersfield Giants	2023	

=== Losses ===
Player/Coach	Club	Source
Jack Cameron	South Sydney Rabbitohs	
Matt Cooper	Lakes United	
Herman Ese'ese	Gold Coast Titans	
Beau Fermor	Gold Coast Titans	
David Furner (assistant coach)	Canterbury-Bankstown Bulldogs	
Tim Glasby	Retirement	
Tony Gleeson (NSW Cup coach)	Released	
Aidan Guerra	Retirement	
Danny Levi	Manly Warringah Sea Eagles	
Mason Lino	Wakefield Trinity	
Toby Marks	Canberra Raiders	
Sione Mata'utia	St Helens R.F.C.	
Andrew McCullough	Brisbane Broncos	
Tautau Moga	South Sydney Rabbitohs	
Tyronne Roberts-Davis	Wests Tigers	
Brandon Russell	Tweed Heads Seagulls	
Bayden Searle	Macquarie Scorpions	

=== Promoted juniors ===
Player	Junior side	Source
Harry Croker	Knights Jersey Flegg Cup	
Cooper Jenkins	Knights Jersey Flegg Cup	
Christian Ma'anaima	Knights Jersey Flegg Cup	
Jaron Purcell	Knights Jersey Flegg Cup	
Daniel Ticehurst	Knights Jersey Flegg Cup	
Chris Vea'ila	Knights S. G. Ball Cup	

=== Change of role ===
Player/Coach	New role	Source
Adam Bettridge (Jersey Flegg Cup coach)	Knights S. G. Ball Cup assistant coach	
Luke Huth	Knights NSW Cup	
Rory Kostjasyn (Knights development coach)	Knights NRL assistant coach	
Eric Smith (Knights development coach)	Knights NRL assistant coach	

=== Re-signings ===
Player/Coach	Re-signed to	Source
Bradman Best	2024	
Jayden Brailey	2025	
Lachlan Fitzgibbon	2023	
Hymel Hunt	2023	
Brodie Jones	2023	
Kurt Mann	2023	
Adam O'Brien (head coach)	2024	
Mitchell Pearce	2022	
Daniel Saifiti	2026	
Jacob Saifiti	2024	
Starford To'a	2023	

=== Player contract situations ===
2021 (left)	2022	2023	2024	2025	2026
Tyler Coburn	McKenzie Baker	Mitchell Barnett	Bradman Best	Jayden Brailey	Daniel Saifiti
Blake Green	Mitch Black	Jake Clifford	Jacob Saifiti		
Zac Hosking	Zane Camroux	Lachlan Fitzgibbon	Kalyn Ponga		
Josh King	Harry Croker	Tyson Frizell			
Jacob Kiraz	Mat Croker	Bailey Hodgson			
Blake Lenehan	Phoenix Crossland	Hymel Hunt			
Christian Ma'anaima	Tex Hoy	Jack Johns			
Mitchell Pearce	Cooper Jenkins	Brodie Jones			
Gehamat Shibasaki	Edrick Lee	David Klemmer			
Garrett Smith	Dylan Lucas	Kurt Mann			
Matt Soper-Lawler	Jirah Momoisea	Chris Randall			
Starford To'a	Brayden Musgrove	Enari Tuala			
Connor Watson	Jaron Purcell	Chris Vea'ila			
	Simi Sasagi	Dom Young			
	Pasami Saulo				
	Sauaso Sue				
	Daniel Ticehurst				

== Ladder ==
2021 NRL season
Pos	Team	Pld	W	D	L	B	PF	PA	PD	Pts
1	Melbourne Storm	24	21	0	3	1	815	316	+499	44
2	Penrith Panthers (P)	24	21	0	3	1	676	286	+390	44
3	South Sydney Rabbitohs	24	20	0	4	1	775	453	+322	42
4	Manly-Warringah Sea Eagles	24	16	0	8	1	744	492	+252	34
5	Sydney Roosters	24	16	0	8	1	630	489	+141	34
6	Parramatta Eels	24	15	0	9	1	566	457	+109	32
7	Newcastle Knights	24	12	0	12	1	428	571	−143	26
8	Gold Coast Titans	24	10	0	14	1	580	583	−3	22
9	Cronulla-Sutherland Sharks	24	10	0	14	1	520	556	−36	22
10	Canberra Raiders	24	10	0	14	1	481	578	−97	22
11	St. George Illawarra Dragons	24	8	0	16	1	474	616	−142	18
12	New Zealand Warriors	24	8	0	16	1	453	624	−171	18
13	Wests Tigers	24	8	0	16	1	500	714	−214	18
14	Brisbane Broncos	24	7	0	17	1	446	695	−249	16
15	North Queensland Cowboys	24	7	0	17	1	460	748	−288	16
16	Canterbury-Bankstown Bulldogs	24	3	0	21	1	340	710	−370	8

== Milestones ==
- Round 1: Jayden Brailey captained his 1st game for the club.
- Round 1: Tyson Frizell made his debut for the club, after previously playing for the St. George Illawarra Dragons.
- Round 1: Daniel Saifiti played his 100th career game and captained his 1st game for the club.
- Round 1: Sauaso Sue made his debut for the club, after previously playing for the Canterbury-Bankstown Bulldogs.
- Round 2: Jayden Brailey scored his 1st try for the club.
- Round 3: Tyson Frizell scored his 1st try for the club.
- Round 3: Mitchell Pearce played his 300th career game.
- Round 3: Dom Young made his NRL debut for the club, after previously playing for the Huddersfield Giants.
- Round 4: Kurt Mann kicked his 1st career field goal.
- Round 5: Chris Randall scored his 1st career try.
- Round 6: Hymel Hunt played his 50th game for the club.
- Round 6: Brodie Jones scored his 1st career try.
- Round 6: Brayden Musgrove made his NRL debut for the club.
- Round 8: David Klemmer played his 50th game for the club.
- Round 8: Brayden Musgrove scored his 1st career try.
- Round 8: Sauaso Sue played his 150th career game.
- Round 9: Connor Watson played his 50th game for the club.
- Round 10: Mitchell Barnett played his 100th career game.
- Round 11: Phoenix Crossland kicked his 1st career goal.
- Round 11: Simi Sasagi made his NRL debut for the club.
- Round 11: Sauaso Sue scored his 1st try for the club.
- Round 12: Mitchell Barnett played his 100th game for the club.
- Round 12: Enari Tuala played his 50th career game.
- Round 13: Jake Clifford made his debut for the club, after previously playing for the North Queensland Cowboys.
- Round 13: Mat Croker made his NRL debut for the club.
- Round 13: Jack Johns made his debut for the club, after previously playing for the South Sydney Rabbitohs.
- Round 14: Jake Clifford kicked his 1st goal for the club.
- Round 14: Kurt Mann played his 50th game for the club.
- Round 14: Dom Young scored his 1st career try.
- Round 16: Hymel Hunt played his 100th career game.
- Round 21: Jake Clifford played his 50th career game and scored his 1st try for the club.
- Round 21: Kalyn Ponga captained his 1st game for the club.
- Round 22: Connor Watson played his 100th career game.
- Round 23: Jirah Momoisea made his NRL debut for the club.
- Round 25: Jack Johns scored his 1st career try.

== Jerseys and sponsors ==
In 2021, the Knights' jerseys were made by O'Neills and their major sponsor was nib Health Funds.

2021 Home Jersey	2021 Away Jersey	2021 Heritage Jersey	2021 Indigenous Jersey	2021 NSW Mining Jersey

== Fixtures ==
=== Pre-season Trials ===
Date	Opponent	Venue	Score	Tries	Conversions	Attendance
Saturday, 27 February	Melbourne Storm	Albury Sports Ground	10–30	D.Lucas, D.Young	C.Randall (1/1)	
Legend: Win Loss Draw

== Statistics ==
Name	Appearances	Tries	Goals	Field goals	Points	Captain	Age
Mitchell Barnett	24	4	13	0	42	0	27
Bradman Best	17	3	0	0	12	0	20
Jayden Brailey	23	3	0	0	12	20	25
Jake Clifford	13	2	33	0	74	0	23
Mat Croker	2	0	0	0	0	0	22
Phoenix Crossland	9	1	1	0	6	0	21
Lachlan Fitzgibbon	10	3	0	0	12	0	27
Tyson Frizell	19	3	0	0	12	0	30
Blake Green	6	0	0	0	0	0	35
Tex Hoy	7	1	6	0	16	0	22
Hymel Hunt	17	4	0	0	16	0	28
Jack Johns	6	1	0	0	4	0	24
Brodie Jones	22	3	0	0	12	0	23
Josh King	18	1	0	0	4	0	26
David Klemmer	21	0	0	0	0	0	28
Kurt Mann	22	3	0	1	13	0	28
Jirah Momoisea	3	0	0	0	0	0	23
Brayden Musgrove	7	1	0	0	4	0	23
Mitchell Pearce	12	3	0	1	13	0	32
Kalyn Ponga	15	8	10	0	52	5	23
Chris Randall	5	2	0	0	8	0	26
Daniel Saifiti	20	3	0	0	12	17	25
Jacob Saifiti	23	3	0	0	12	0	25
Simi Sasagi	2	0	0	0	0	0	20
Pasami Saulo	3	0	0	0	0	0	23
Gehamat Shibasaki	3	1	0	0	4	0	23
Sauaso Sue	23	2	0	0	8	0	29
Starford To'a	12	6	0	0	24	0	21
Enari Tuala	25	13	0	0	52	0	23
Connor Watson	25	2	0	0	8	0	25
Dom Young	6	4	0	0	16	0	20
Totals	25	80	63	2	448	–	Average: 25

31 players used.

== Representative honours ==
The following players appeared in a representative match or were named in a representative squad in 2021.

Emerging Blues squad

- Bradman Best
- Tex Hoy
- Jacob Saifiti

New South Wales

- Daniel Saifiti

Queensland

- Kurt Mann (18th man)
- Kalyn Ponga

== Individual honours ==
=== Newcastle Knights awards ===
- Player of the Year (Danny Buderus Medal): Jacob Saifiti
- Excalibur Club Players' Player: Connor Watson
- Gladiator of the Year: Jayden Brailey
- Community Player of the Year: Josh King
- Rookie of the Year: Brodie Jones
- Knight in Shining Armour: Mitchell Pearce
- Club Person of the Year: Mathew Morris & Jane Farrell
- NSW Cup Player of the Year: Zac Hosking
- NSW Cup Excalibur Club Players' Player: Mat Croker & Luke Huth
