= 2021 New Zealand Warriors season =

NRL rugby league season

- NRL Rank: 12th
- 2021 record: Wins: 8; draws: 0; losses: 13
- Points scored: For: 415; against: 528

Team information
- CEO: Cameron George
- Coach: Nathan Brown
- Captain: Roger Tuivasa-Sheck
- Stadium: Central Coast Stadium
- Avg. attendance: 9,955
- High attendance: 33,175

Top scorers
- Tries: Ken Maumalo (8)
- Goals: Kodi Nikorima (42)
- Points: Kodi Nikorima (100)
← 2020	List of seasons	2022 →

The 2021 New Zealand Warriors season was the 27th in the club's history and they competed in the 2021 NRL season. The team was coached by Nathan Brown, who coached the club for his first season ever. Roger Tuivasa-Sheck captained the team for his fifth consecutive season.

== Fixtures ==
=== Pre-season ===
Date	Round	Opponent	Venue	Result	Score	War. Tries	War. Goals	Report
20 February	Trial	Melbourne Storm	Moreton Daily Stadium, Redcliffe	Cancelled				
27 February	Trial	Gold Coast Titans	Oakes Oval, Lismore	Draw	12-12	Josh Curran (1), Jazz Tevaga (1)	Kodi Nikorima 2/2	
Legend: Win Loss Draw Bye

=== Regular season ===
Date	Round	Opponent	Venue/Attendance	Result	War.	Opp.	Tries	Goals	Field goals	Report
13 March	1	Gold Coast Titans	Central Coast Stadium, Gosford	Win	19	6	Bayley Sironen (1), Leeson Ah Mau (1), Kodi Nikorima (1)	Kodi Nikorima 3/3	Chanel Harris-Tavita 1/1	
19 March	2	Newcastle Knights	Central Coast Stadium, Gosford	Loss	16	20	Ben Murdoch-Masila (1), Adam Pompey (1), Ken Maumalo (1)	Kodi Nikorima 2/3		
27 March	3	Canberra Raiders	GIO Stadium, Canberra	Win	34	31	Addin Fonua-Blake (1), Kodi Nikorima (1), Bayley Sironen (1), Ben Murdoch-Masila (1), Roger Tuivasa-Sheck (1), Adam Pompey (1)	Kodi Nikorima 5/6		
4 April	4	Sydney Roosters	Sydney Cricket Ground, Sydney	Loss	12	32	Adam Pompey (1), Tohu Harris (1)	Kodi Nikorima 2/2		
9 April	5	Manly Warringah Sea Eagles	Central Coast Stadium, Gosford	Loss	12	13	Ken Maumalo (1), Sean O'Sullivan (1)	Kodi Nikorima 2/2		
18 April	6	St. George Illawarra Dragons	Netstrata Jubilee Stadium, Sydney	Win	20	14	Tohu Harris (1), Paul Turner (1), Roger Tuivasa-Sheck (1)	Kodi Nikorima 4/4		
25 April	7	Melbourne Storm	AAMI Park, Melbourne	Loss	20	42	Ken Maumalo (3), Ben Murdoch-Masila (1)	Kodi Nikorima 2/4		
2 May	8	North Queensland Cowboys	Central Coast Stadium, Gosford	Win	24	20	Kodi Nikorima (1), Rocco Berry (1), Ben Murdoch-Masila (1), Adam Pompey (1)	Kodi Nikorima 4/5		
9 May	9	Manly Warringah Sea Eagles	Brookvale Oval, Sydney	Loss	32	38	Chanel Harris-Tavita (2), Tohu Harris (1), Josh Curran (1), Reece Walsh (1)	Kodi Nikorima 6/6		
16 May	10	Parramatta Eels	Suncorp Stadium, Brisbane	Loss	18	34	Josh Curran (1), Ben Murdoch-Masila (1), Reece Walsh (1)	Kodi Nikorima 3/3		
21 May	11	Wests Tigers	Central Coast Stadium, Gosford	Win	30	26	Marcelo Montoya (2), Jack Murchie (1), Roger Tuivasa-Sheck (1), Reece Walsh (1), Wayde Egan (1)	Kodi Nikorima 3/6		
28 May	12	North Queensland Cowboys	Queensland Country Bank Stadium, Townsville	Loss	28	29	Euan Aitken (2), Reece Walsh (1), Marcelo Montoya (1), Ben Murdoch-Masila (1)	Kodi Nikorima 4/5		
	13	Bye								
13 June	14	Melbourne Storm	Central Coast Stadium, Gosford	Loss	16	42	Ken Maumalo (3)	Kodi Nikorima 2/4		
19 June	15	Newcastle Knights	McDonald Jones Stadium, Newcastle	Loss	6	10	Euan Aitken (1)	Reece Walsh 1/1		
2 July	16	St. George Illawarra Dragons	Central Coast Stadium, Gosford	Loss	18	19	Wayde Egan (1), Eliesa Katoa (1), Bunty Afoa (1)	Chad Townsend 3/3		
11 July	17	Cronulla-Sutherland Sharks	Netstrata Jubilee Stadium, Sydney	Loss	12	20	Reece Walsh (1), Roger Tuivasa-Sheck (1)	Reece Walsh 2/2		
18 July	18	Penrith Panthers	Suncorp Stadium, Brisbane	Loss	16	30	Wayde Egan (1), Rocco Berry (1), Reece Walsh 72'	Reece Walsh 2/3		
24 July	19	South Sydney Rabbitohs	Sunshine Coast Stadium, Sunshine Coast	Loss	22	60	Dallin Watene-Zelezniak (1), Marcelo Montoya (1), Kodi Nikorima (1), Reece Walsh (1)	Reece Walsh 3/4		
30 July	20	Wests Tigers	Suncorp Stadium, Brisbane	Win	18	16	Euan Aitken (1), Bunty Afoa (1)	Reece Walsh 3/3		
7 August	21	Cronulla-Sutherland Sharks	Cbus Super Stadium, Gold Coast	Win	18	16	Dallin Watene-Zelezniak (1), Reece Walsh (1), Euan Aitken (1)	Reece Walsh 3/4		
15 August	22	Canterbury Bulldogs	Moreton Daily Stadium, Redcliffe	Win	24	10	Josh Curran (1), Jazz Tevaga (1), Edward Kosi (1), Reece Walsh (1)	Reece Walsh 4/5		
22 August	23	Brisbane Broncos	Suncorp Stadium, Brisbane	Loss	22	24	Marcelo Montoya (1), Peta Hiku (1), Josh Curran (1), Dallin Watene-Zelezniak (1), Euan Aitken (1)	Reece Walsh 1/5		
27 August	24	Canberra Raiders	BB Print Stadium, Mackay	Loss	16	28	Sean O'Sullivan (1), Rocco Berry (1), Dallin Watene-Zelezniak (1)	Reece Walsh (2/3)		
5 September	25	Gold Coast Titans	Cbus Super Stadium, Gold Coast	Loss	0	44				
Legend: Win Loss Draw Bye

== Ladder ==
Pos	Team	Pld	W	D	L	B	PF	PA	PD	Pts	
1	Melbourne Storm (M)	24	21	0	3	1	815	316	+499	44	Advance to finals series
2	Penrith Panthers (P)	24	21	0	3	1	676	286	+390	44	Advance to finals series
3	South Sydney Rabbitohs	24	20	0	4	1	775	453	+322	42	Advance to finals series
4	Manly-Warringah Sea Eagles	24	16	0	8	1	744	492	+252	34	Advance to finals series
5	Sydney Roosters	24	16	0	8	1	630	489	+141	34	Advance to finals series
6	Parramatta Eels	24	15	0	9	1	566	457	+109	32	Advance to finals series
7	Newcastle Knights	24	12	0	12	1	428	571	−143	26	Advance to finals series
8	Gold Coast Titans	24	10	0	14	1	580	583	−3	22	Advance to finals series
9	Cronulla-Sutherland Sharks	24	10	0	14	1	520	556	−36	22	
10	Canberra Raiders	24	10	0	14	1	481	578	−97	22	
11	St. George Illawarra Dragons	24	8	0	16	1	474	616	−142	18	
12	New Zealand Warriors	24	8	0	16	1	453	624	−171	18	
13	Wests Tigers	24	8	0	16	1	500	714	−214	18	
14	Brisbane Broncos	24	7	0	17	1	446	695	−249	16	
15	North Queensland Cowboys	24	7	0	17	1	460	748	−288	16	
16	Canterbury-Bankstown Bulldogs (W)	24	3	0	21	1	340	710	−370	8	

Updated to match(es) played on 5 September 2021. Source: 2021 NRL Ladder
(M) Minor premiers; (P) Premiers; (W) Wooden spoon

== Transfers/Signings ==
=== In ===
Player	2020 Club	2021 Club
Marcelo Montoya	Canterbury-Bankstown Bulldogs	New Zealand Warriors
Addin Fonua-Blake	Manly-Warringah Sea Eagles	New Zealand Warriors
Kane Evans	Parramatta Eels	New Zealand Warriors
Bayley Sironen	South Sydney Rabbitohs	New Zealand Warriors
Euan Aitken	St. George Illawarra Dragons	New Zealand Warriors
Ben Murdoch-Masila	Super League: Warrington Wolves	New Zealand Warriors
Chad Townsend	Cronulla-Sutherland Sharks	New Zealand Warriors

=== Out ===
Player	2020 Club	2021 Club
Gerard Beale	New Zealand Warriors	St. George Illawarra Dragons
Adam Blair	New Zealand Warriors	Retirement
Lachlan Burr	New Zealand Warriors	North Queensland Cowboys
Blake Green	New Zealand Warriors	Newcastle Knights
Patrick Herbert	New Zealand Warriors	Gold Coast Titans
Karl Lawton	New Zealand Warriors	Manly-Warringah Sea Eagles
Agnatius Paasi	New Zealand Warriors	Super League: St. Helens
Isaiah Papali'i	New Zealand Warriors	Parramatta Eels
Leivaha Pulu	New Zealand Warriors	Norths Devils (Intrust Super Cup)
Nathaniel Roache	New Zealand Warriors	Parramatta Eels

=== Future Confirmed Signings ===
Player	2021 Club	2022 Club
Shaun Johnson	Cronulla Sharks	New Zealand Warriors
Aaron Pene	Melbourne Storm	New Zealand Warriors

=== Future Confirmed Departures ===
Player	2021 Club	2022 Club
Roger Tuivasa-Sheck	New Zealand Warriors	NZ Rugby Union
