= 2021 North Queensland Cowboys season =

Coordinates: 27°27′53″S 153°0′34″E

- NRL Rank: 15th
- Play-off result: Missed finals
- 2021 record: Wins: 7; draws: 0; losses: 17
- Points scored: For: 460; against: 748

Team information
- CEO: Jeff Reibel
- Coach: Todd Payten
- Captain: Jason Taumalolo
- Stadium: Queensland Country Bank Stadium
- Avg. attendance: 14,472
- High attendance: 22,222 (vs. Brisbane Broncos, Round 9)

Top scorers
- Tries: Kyle Feldt (12)
- Goals: Valentine Holmes (54)
- Points: Valentine Holmes (126)
| ← 2020 | 2022 → |

The 2021 North Queensland Cowboys season was the 27th in the club's history. Coached by Todd Payten and captained by Jason Taumalolo, they competed in the NRL's 2021 Telstra Premiership.

The 2021 season was the Cowboys' first under Payten, who joined the club from the New Zealand Warriors on a three-year deal. He became the club's eighth full-time head coach and their 10th overall. On 16 December 2020, Taumalolo was named as co-captain of the club alongside Morgan.

The club endured another disappointing season in 2021, missing the finals for the fourth consecutive year.

== Season summary ==
On 9 April, co-captain Michael Morgan announced his immediate retirement from rugby league due to an ongoing shoulder injury.

=== Milestones ===
- Round 1: Corey Jensen played his 50th NRL game for the club.
- Round 2: Lachlan Burr made his debut for the club.
- Round 4: Coen Hess played his 100th NRL game for the club.
- Round 5: Ben Condon scored his first NRL try.
- Round 5: Lachlan Burr scored his first try for the club.
- Round 5: The club won at Leichhardt Oval for the first time since Round 12, 2000.
- Round 7: Jake Granville played his 150th NRL game.
- Round 10: Jason Taumalolo played his 200th game for the club.
- Round 11: Heilum Luki made his NRL debut.
- Round 11: Heilum Luki scored his first NRL try.
- Round 11: Valentine Holmes scored his 500th career point.
- Round 14: Tom Dearden made his debut for the club.
- Round 15: Tom Dearden scored his first try for the club.
- Round 19: Kane Bradley made his NRL debut.
- Round 19: Kane Bradley scored his first try for the club.
- Round 19: Kyle Feldt scored his 100th try for the club.
- Round 22: Jeremiah Nanai and Griffin Neame made their NRL debuts.
- Round 22: Jeremiah Nanai scored his first NRL try.
- Round 23: Laitia Moceidreke made his NRL debut.
- Round 23: Laitia Moceidreke scored his first NRL try.
- Round 24: Scott Drinkwater played his 50th NRL game.
- Round 25: Scott Drinkwater played his 50th game for the club.

=== Squad ===
North Queensland Cowboys 2021 Squad
| NRL squad | | | Coaching Staff |
|---|---|---|---|
| Daejarn Asi^{D} – CE, FE; Javid Bowen – CE, WG; Kane Bradley – WG; Lachlan Burr – PR, LK; Ben Condon – SR; Reuben Cotter – HK, LK; Tom Dearden – HB, FE; Scott Drinkwater – FE, FB; Mitchell Dunn – SR; Kyle Feldt – WG; Tom Gilbert – LK, PR | Jake Granville – HK; Ben Hampton – FE, FB; Coen Hess – PR, SR; Peter Hola – LK, SR, PR; Valentine Holmes – FB, WG; Corey Jensen – PR, LK; Connelly Lemuelu – CE, WG; Heilum Luki^{D} – SR; Jordan McLean (vc) – PR; Laitia Moceidreke – WG; Francis Molo – PR | Jeremiah Nanai^{D} – SR; Griffin Neame – PR; Emry Pere – PR; Riley Price^{D} – SR, LK; Reece Robson – HK; Hamiso Tabuai-Fidow – FB, CE; Murray Taulagi – CE, WG; Jason Taumalolo (c) – LK, SR; Shane Wright – SR | Head coach: Todd Payten; Assistant coaches: Dean Young (Assistant coach); Steve Georgallis (Assistant coach); Ben Rauter (Development coach); Paul Bowman (head of performance); Ashley Graham (Strength & Conditioning coach); Mark Henry (Strength & Conditioning coach); James Moran (Strength & Conditioning coach); Steve Sartori (physiotherapist); Legend: (c) Captain(s); (vc) Vice-captain(s); D Development player; Updated: 27 August 2021; Source(s): NQ Cowboys |

== Squad movement ==
=== Gains ===
| Player | Signed From | Until End of | Notes |
|---|---|---|---|
| Javid Bowen | Northern Pride | 2022 | |
| Kane Bradley | Wests Tigers | 2022 | |
| Lachlan Burr | New Zealand Warriors | 2022 | |
| Tom Dearden | Brisbane Broncos (mid-season) | 2024 | |
| Laitia Moceidreke | Canterbury Bulldogs (mid-season) | 2023 | |

=== Losses ===
| Player | Signed To | Until End of | Notes |
|---|---|---|---|
| John Asiata | Brisbane Broncos | 2021 | |
| Michael Bell | Townsville Blackhawks (mid-season) | 2021 | |
| Jake Clifford | Newcastle Knights (mid-season) | 2023 | |
| Gavin Cooper | Retired | – | |
| Wiremu Greig | Parramatta Eels (mid-season) | 2023 | |
| Esan Marsters | Gold Coast Titans (mid-season) | 2022 | |
| Josh McGuire | St George Illawarra Dragons (mid-season) | 2022 | |
| Michael Morgan | Retired (mid-season) | – | |
| Justin O'Neill | Retired (mid-season) | – | |
| Tom Opacic | Parramatta Eels | 2021 | |
| Dan Russell | Brisbane Tigers | 2021 | |
| Tukimihia Simpkins | Wests Tigers | 2023 | |
| Garrett Smith | Newcastle Knights | 2021 | |

=== Re-signings ===
| Player | Club | Until End of | Notes |
|---|---|---|---|
| Javid Bowen | North Queensland Cowboys | 2022 | |
| Ben Condon | North Queensland Cowboys | 2023 | |
| Scott Drinkwater | North Queensland Cowboys | 2023 | |
| Jake Granville | North Queensland Cowboys | 2022 | |
| Ben Hampton | North Queensland Cowboys | 2022 | |
| Griffin Neame | North Queensland Cowboys | 2023 | |
| Riley Price | North Queensland Cowboys | 2023 | |

== Ladder ==
| Pos | Team | Pld | W | D | L | B | PF | PA | PD | Pts | |
|---|---|---|---|---|---|---|---|---|---|---|---|
| 1 | Melbourne Storm (M) | 24 | 21 | 0 | 3 | 1 | 815 | 316 | +499 | 44 | Advance to finals series |
| 2 | Penrith Panthers (P) | 24 | 21 | 0 | 3 | 1 | 676 | 286 | +390 | 44 | Advance to finals series |
| 3 | South Sydney Rabbitohs | 24 | 20 | 0 | 4 | 1 | 775 | 453 | +322 | 42 | Advance to finals series |
| 4 | Manly-Warringah Sea Eagles | 24 | 16 | 0 | 8 | 1 | 744 | 492 | +252 | 34 | Advance to finals series |
| 5 | Sydney Roosters | 24 | 16 | 0 | 8 | 1 | 630 | 489 | +141 | 34 | Advance to finals series |
| 6 | Parramatta Eels | 24 | 15 | 0 | 9 | 1 | 566 | 457 | +109 | 32 | Advance to finals series |
| 7 | Newcastle Knights | 24 | 12 | 0 | 12 | 1 | 428 | 571 | −143 | 26 | Advance to finals series |
| 8 | Gold Coast Titans | 24 | 10 | 0 | 14 | 1 | 580 | 583 | −3 | 22 | Advance to finals series |
| 9 | Cronulla-Sutherland Sharks | 24 | 10 | 0 | 14 | 1 | 520 | 556 | −36 | 22 | |
| 10 | Canberra Raiders | 24 | 10 | 0 | 14 | 1 | 481 | 578 | −97 | 22 | |
| 11 | St. George Illawarra Dragons | 24 | 8 | 0 | 16 | 1 | 474 | 616 | −142 | 18 | |
| 12 | New Zealand Warriors | 24 | 8 | 0 | 16 | 1 | 453 | 624 | −171 | 18 | |
| 13 | Wests Tigers | 24 | 8 | 0 | 16 | 1 | 500 | 714 | −214 | 18 | |
| 14 | Brisbane Broncos | 24 | 7 | 0 | 17 | 1 | 446 | 695 | −249 | 16 | |
| 15 | North Queensland Cowboys | 24 | 7 | 0 | 17 | 1 | 460 | 748 | −288 | 16 | |
| 16 | Canterbury-Bankstown Bulldogs (W) | 24 | 3 | 0 | 21 | 1 | 340 | 710 | −370 | 8 | |

Updated to match(es) played on 5 September 2021. Source: 2021 NRL Ladder
(M) Minor premiers; (P) Premiers; (W) Wooden spoon

== Fixtures ==
=== Pre-season ===
On 13 February, the Cowboys played the Townsville Blackhawks in an unofficial hour-long scrimmage match in Ayr.

| Date | Round | Opponent | Venue | Score | Tries | Goals | Attendance |
|---|---|---|---|---|---|---|---|
| Saturday, 27 February | Trial 1 | Brisbane Broncos | Moreton Daily Stadium | 34 – 18 | Drinkwater, Dunn, Feldt, Holmes, Marsters, Tabuai-Fidow | Clifford (3/4), Holmes (2/2) | |
Legend: Win Loss Draw Bye

=== Regular season ===
| Date | Round | Opponent | Venue | Score | Tries | Goals | Attendance |
|---|---|---|---|---|---|---|---|
| Saturday, 13 March | Round 1 | Penrith Panthers | Panthers Stadium | 0 – 24 | | | 14,077 |
| Saturday, 20 March | Round 2 | St George Illawarra Dragons | Queensland Country Bank Stadium | 18 – 25 | Granville, Hess, Holmes | Holmes (3/3) | 15,120 |
| Sunday, 28 March | Round 3 | Gold Coast Titans | Queensland Country Bank Stadium | 8 – 44 | Tabuai-Fidow, Taulagi | Holmes (0/2) | 12,621 |
| Saturday, 3 April | Round 4 | Cronulla Sharks | Netstrata Jubilee Stadium | 10 – 48 | Holmes, Tabuai-Fidow | Holmes (1/2) | 5,119 |
| Sunday, 11 April | Round 5 | Wests Tigers | Leichhardt Oval | 34 – 30 | Taulagi (2), Burr, Condon, Drinkwater, Tabuai-Fidow | Holmes (5/6) | 9,433 |
| Sunday, 18 April | Round 6 | Canterbury Bulldogs | Queensland Country Bank Stadium | 30 – 18 | Condon, Dunn, Feldt, Granville, Robson | Holmes (5/5) | 11,965 |
| Saturday, 24 April | Round 7 | Canberra Raiders | Queensland Country Bank Stadium | 26 – 24 | Condon, Feldt, O'Neill, Robson | Holmes (5/5) | 13,791 |
| Sunday, 2 May | Round 8 | Warriors | Central Coast Stadium | 20 – 24 | Taulagi (2), Drinkwater, Robson | Holmes (2/4) | 3,692 |
| Saturday, 8 May | Round 9 | Brisbane Broncos | Queensland Country Bank Stadium | 19 – 18 | Feldt, Lemuelu, Taumalolo | Holmes (3/4, 1 FG) | 22,222 |
| Saturday, 15 May | Round 10 | Sydney Roosters | Suncorp Stadium | 16 – 30 | Drinkwater (2), Bowen | Holmes (2/4) | 45,122 |
| Thursday, 20 May | Round 11 | Newcastle Knights | Queensland Country Bank Stadium | 36 – 20 | Taulagi (3), Dunn, Holmes, Luki, Robson | Holmes (4/7) | 11,208 |
| Friday, 28 May | Round 12 | Warriors | Queensland Country Bank Stadium | 29 – 28 | Clifford, Drinkwater, Feldt, Tabuai-Fidow, Taulagi | Holmes (4/5, 1 FG) | 14,951 |
| | Round 13 | Bye | | | | | |
| Friday, 11 June | Round 14 | Manly Sea Eagles | 4 Pines Park | 18 – 50 | Bowen, Tabuai-Fidow, Taulagi | Holmes (3/3) | 6,801 |
| Friday, 18 June | Round 15 | Cronulla Sharks | Queensland Country Bank Stadium | 24 – 26 | Feldt (2), Dearden, Molo | Holmes (4/4) | 13,926 |
| Saturday, 3 July | Round 16 | Newcastle Knights | McDonald Jones Stadium | 0 – 38 | | | 7,610 |
| Friday, 9 July | Round 17 | South Sydney Rabbitohs | McDonald Jones Stadium | 18 - 46 | Dearden, Wright, Feldt | Drinkwater (3/4) | 3,127 |
| Saturday, 17 July | Round 18 | Sydney Roosters | Queensland Country Bank Stadium | 18 - 34 | Bowen, Tabuai-Fidow, Robson | Drinkwater (3/3) | 15,933 |
| Friday, 23 July | Round 19 | Melbourne Storm | Queensland Country Bank Stadium | 16 – 20 | Bradley, Feldt, Hess | Drinkwater (2/3) | 14,924 |
| Friday, 30 July | Round 20 | Brisbane Broncos | Suncorp Stadium | 18 – 37 | Dearden, Feldt, Granville | Drinkwater (3/4) | 29,136 |
| Sunday, 8 August | Round 21 | Gold Coast Titans | Cbus Super Stadium | 14 – 36 | Dearden, Feldt, Holmes | Holmes (1/3) | 0 |
| Saturday, 14 August | Round 22 | Wests Tigers | Queensland Country Bank Stadium | 16 – 24 | Dearden, Hampton, Nanai | Holmes (2/4) | 12,663 |
| Saturday, 21 August | Round 23 | Parramatta Eels | Cbus Super Stadium | 16 – 32 | Granville, Luki, Moceidreke | Holmes (2/3) | 3,013 |
| Saturday, 28 August | Round 24 | St George Illawarra Dragons | Browne Park | 38 – 26 | Feldt (2), Dearden, Hampton, Luki, Robson, Tabuai-Fidow | Holmes (5/7) | 4,487 |
| Sunday, 4 September | Round 25 | Manly Sea Eagles | Queensland Country Bank Stadium | 18 – 46 | Condon, McLean, Tabuai-Fidow | Holmes (3/3) | 14,336 |
Legend: Win Loss Draw Bye

== Statistics ==
| Name | App | T | G | FG | Pts |
|---|---|---|---|---|---|
| Daejarn Asi | 5 | - | - | - | - |
| Javid Bowen | 9 | 3 | - | - | 12 |
| Kane Bradley | 2 | 1 | - | - | 4 |
| Lachlan Burr | 15 | 1 | - | - | 4 |
| Jake Clifford | 7 | 1 | - | - | 4 |
| Ben Condon | 11 | 4 | - | - | 16 |
| Reuben Cotter | 6 | - | - | - | - |
| Tom Dearden | 12 | 6 | - | - | 24 |
| Scott Drinkwater | 24 | 5 | 11 | - | 42 |
| Mitchell Dunn | 20 | 2 | - | - | 8 |
| Kyle Feldt | 20 | 12 | - | - | 48 |
| Tom Gilbert | 11 | - | - | - | - |
| Jake Granville | 24 | 4 | - | - | 16 |
| Ben Hampton | 10 | 2 | - | - | 8 |
| Coen Hess | 22 | 2 | - | - | 8 |
| Peter Hola | 3 | - | - | - | - |
| Valentine Holmes | 20 | 4 | 54 | 2 | 126 |
| Corey Jensen | 9 | - | - | - | - |
| Connelly Lemuelu | 13 | 1 | - | - | 4 |
| Heilum Luki | 11 | 3 | - | - | 12 |
| Esan Marsters | 3 | - | - | - | - |
| Josh McGuire | 4 | - | - | - | - |
| Jordan McLean | 24 | 1 | - | - | 4 |
| Laitia Moceidreke | 1 | 1 | - | - | 4 |
| Francis Molo | 19 | 1 | - | - | 4 |
| Michael Morgan | 2 | - | - | - | - |
| Jeremiah Nanai | 4 | 1 | - | - | 4 |
| Griffin Neame | 3 | - | - | - | - |
| Justin O'Neill | 5 | 1 | - | - | 4 |
| Reece Robson | 24 | 6 | - | - | 24 |
| Hamiso Tabuai-Fidow | 14 | 8 | - | - | 32 |
| Murray Taulagi | 20 | 10 | - | - | 40 |
| Jason Taumalolo | 15 | 1 | - | - | 4 |
| Shane Wright | 16 | 1 | - | - | 4 |
| Totals | | 82 | 65 | 2 | 460 |

== Representatives ==
The following players have played a representative match in 2021.

| | All Stars match | State of Origin 1 | State of Origin 2 | State of Origin 3 |
|---|---|---|---|---|
| Daejarn Asi | Māori All Stars | | | |
| Reuben Cotter | Indigenous All Stars | | | |
| Kyle Feldt | | Queensland | Queensland | |
| Wiremu Greig | Māori All Stars | | | |
| Valentine Holmes | | Queensland | Queensland | Queensland |
| Esan Marsters | Māori All Stars | | | |
| Francis Molo | | | Queensland | Queensland |
| Emry Pere | Māori All Stars | | | |
| Hamiso Tabuai-Fidow | | | | Queensland |

== Honours ==
=== Club ===
- Paul Bowman Medal: Coen Hess
- Players' Player: Murray Taulagi
- The Cowboys Way Award: Jake Granville
- Member's Player of the Year: Jake Granville
- Club Person of the Year: Ben Hampton
- Rookie of the Year: Heilum Luki

== Feeder Clubs ==
=== Queensland Cup ===
- Mackay Cutters - 12th, missed finals
- Northern Pride - 9th, missed finals
- Townsville Blackhawks - 7th, lost elimination final

== Women's team ==
=== QRL Women's Premiership ===
- North Queensland Gold Stars - 3rd, lost semi final
