= Brayden Musgrove =

Australian rugby league footballer

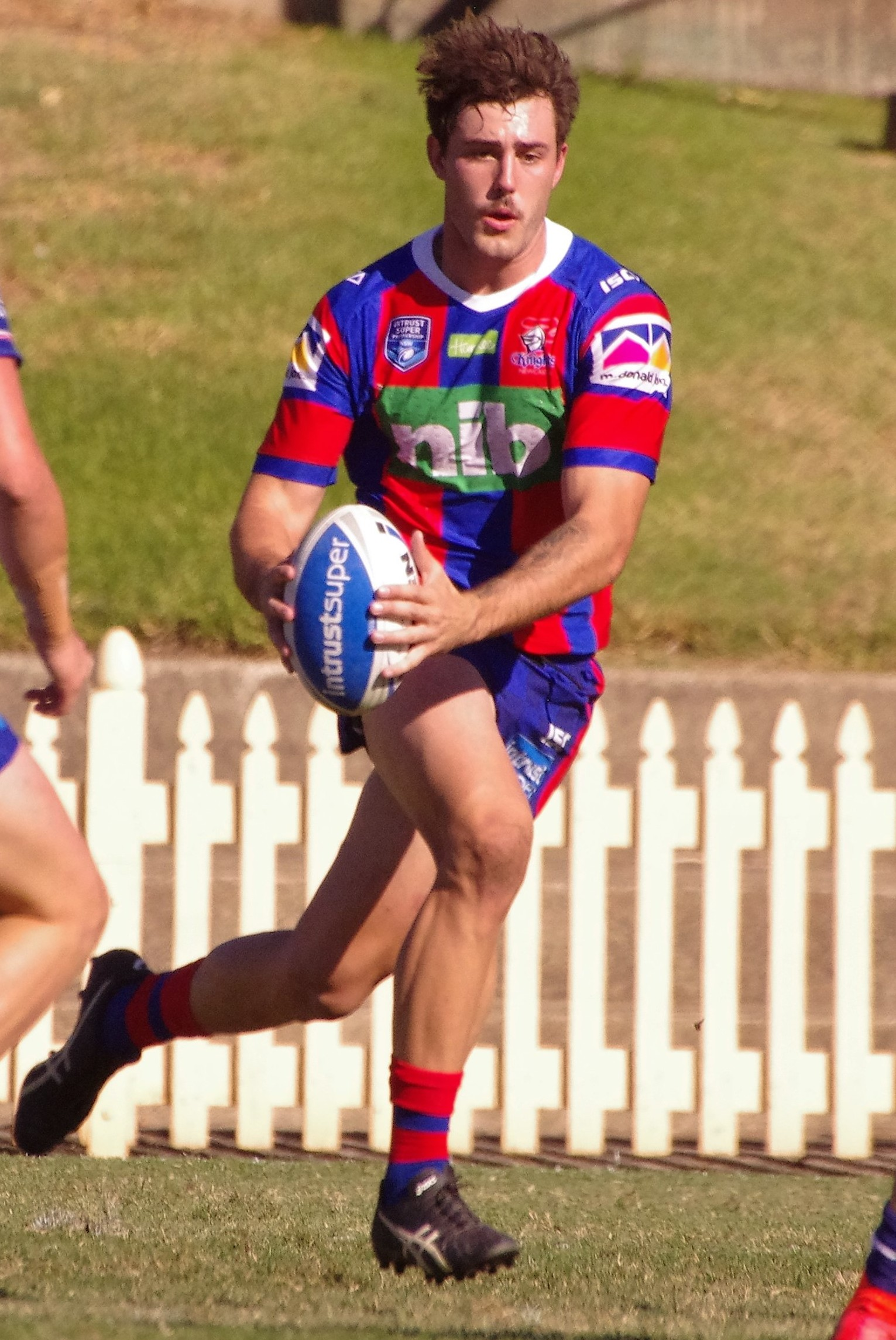

Personal information
- Born: 6 March 1998 (age 28) Maitland, New South Wales, Australia
- Height: 189 cm (6 ft 2 in)
- Weight: 102 kg (16 st 1 lb)

Playing information
- Position: Wing, Centre
Club
Years	Team	Pld	T	G	FG	P
2021	Newcastle Knights	7	1	0	0	4
- Source: As of 8 September 2022

Brayden Musgrove (born 6 March 1998) is an Australian professional rugby league footballer. His positions are wing and centre. He previously played for the Newcastle Knights in the National Rugby League.

== Background ==
Musgrove was born in Maitland, New South Wales, Australia.

He played his junior rugby league for the Cessnock Goannas in the Newcastle Rugby League, before being signed by the Newcastle Knights.

== Playing career ==
=== Early years ===
Musgrove rose through the ranks for the Newcastle Knights, playing with their Harold Matthews Cup team in 2014, the S. G. Ball Cup side in 2016 and finally the under-20s side from 2016 to 2018. In November 2017, he re-signed with the Knights on a 2-year contract until the end of 2019, allowing him to train with the NRL side in 2018. He spent most of the 2018 season on the sidelines after tearing his anterior cruciate ligament. In 2019, he was named one of the Knights development players as part of the NRL squad, while playing for their Canterbury Cup NSW side. Late in 2019, he signed a 2-year contract with the Manly Warringah Sea Eagles starting in 2020, however later backed out of the contract due to homesickness, returning to Newcastle to play with the Cessnock Goannas in the local league.

=== 2021 ===
In 2021, Musgrove returned to Newcastle on a train and trial contract for the 2021 pre-season. In February, he signed a two-year NRL contract with the club until the end of 2022. In round 6 of the 2021 NRL season, he made his NRL debut for Newcastle against the Cronulla-Sutherland Sharks.

=== 2022 ===
Musgrove failed to play an NRL match for the Knights in 2022, before parting ways at the end of the season.
