= Chris Randall (rugby league) =

Australian rugby league footballer

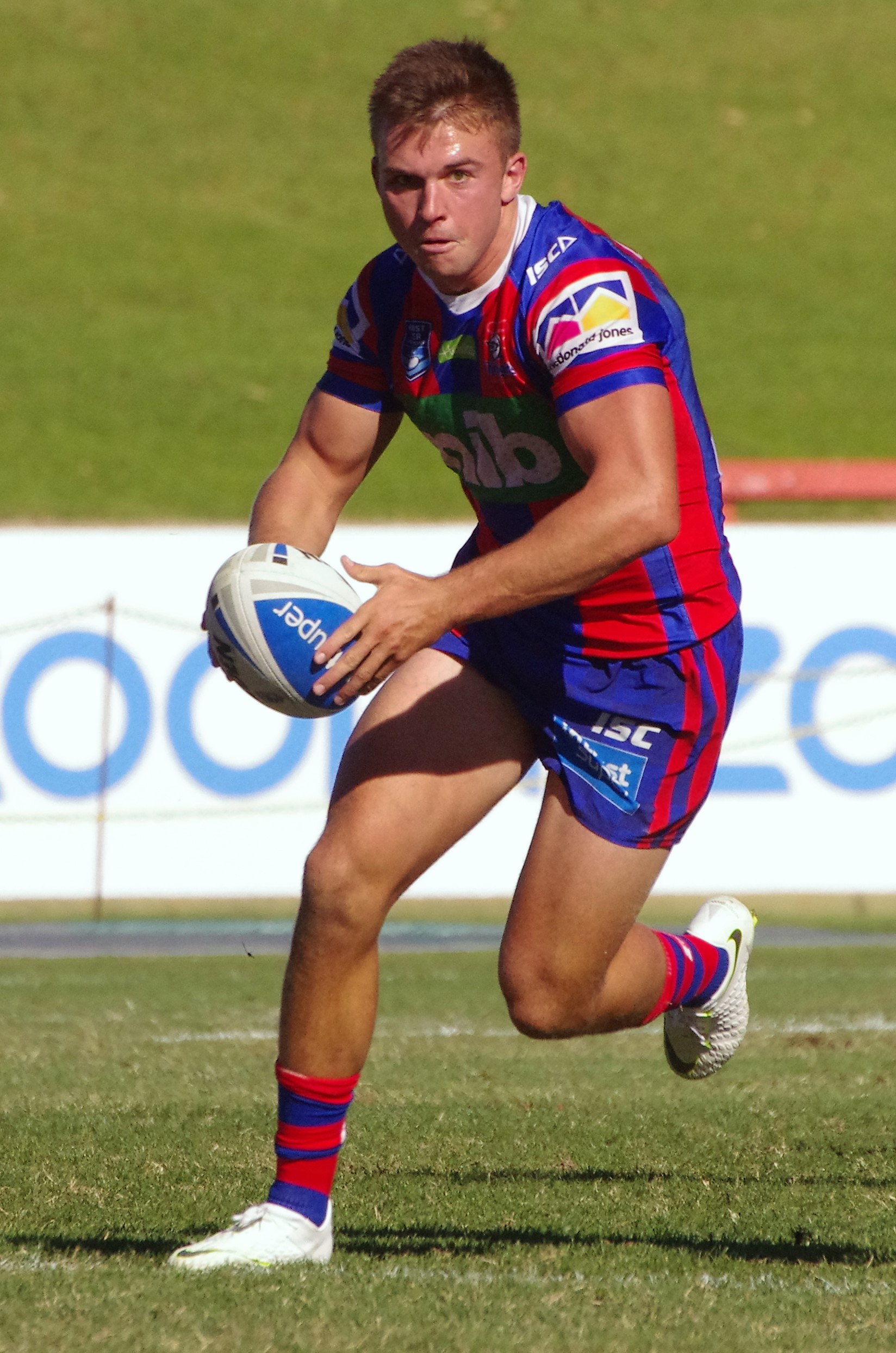

Personal information
- Full name: Christopher Randall
- Born: 17 December 1995 (age 30) Newcastle, New South Wales, Australia
- Height: 183 cm (6 ft 0 in)
- Weight: 92 kg (14 st 7 lb)

Playing information
- Position: Hooker, Lock, Second-row
Club
Years	Team	Pld	T	G	FG	P
2020–22	Newcastle Knights	29	3	0	0	12
2023–	Gold Coast Titans	89	10	0	0	40
	Total	118	13	0	0	52
- Source: As of 4 September 2026

Christopher Randall (born 17 December 1995) is an Australian professional rugby league footballer who plays as a hooker, lock or second-row forward for the Gold Coast Titans in the National Rugby League.

He previously played for the Newcastle Knights in the NRL.

== Background ==
Born in Newcastle, New South Wales, Randall played his junior rugby league for Lakes United, progressing on to the first-grade side in the Newcastle Rugby League competition.

== Playing career ==
=== Early years ===
Randall played his rugby league for Lakes United up until 2018, with some games for the Newcastle Knights' Canterbury Cup NSW team during the 2018 season. In 2019, he became a regular for the Knights' Canterbury Cup NSW side and earned a development contract for the NRL squad.

=== 2020 ===
In round 3 of the 2020 NRL season, Randall made his NRL debut for the Newcastle Knights against the Penrith Panthers. Due to an injury to halfback Mitchell Pearce, Randall came onto the field within the first 10 minutes and played the majority of the game. He set a new record for amount of tackles made by a player making their debut, with 71 tackles as the Newcastle club drew 14-14 all with Penrith.

=== 2021 ===
Randall only made five appearances for Newcastle in the 2021 NRL season. He did not play in the clubs elimination final loss against Parramatta.

=== 2022 ===
Randall played 17 games for Newcastle in the 2022 NRL season as the club missed the finals finishing 14th on the table.

In November, Randall was released from his Newcastle contract and signed a new two-year contract with the Gold Coast Titans starting in 2023, in a player swap with Greg Marzhew.

=== 2023 ===
Randall played a total of 21 matches for the Gold Coast in the 2023 NRL season as the club finished 14th on the table.

=== 2024 ===
Randall played 24 games for the Gold Coast in the 2024 NRL season as the club finished 14th on the table. On 1 October, Randall had signed a new three-year deal to remain at the Gold Coast outfit until 2027.

=== 2025 ===
Randall played 23 matches for the Gold Coast in the 2025 NRL season as the club narrowly avoided the wooden spoon finishing 16th on the table.

=== 2026 ===
Randall played 19 games for the Gold Coast in the 2026 NRL season as the club finished 16th on the table.

== Statistics ==
Year	Team	Games	Tries	Pts
2020	Newcastle Knights	7		
2021	Newcastle Knights	5	2	8
2022	Newcastle Knights	17	1	4
2023	Gold Coast Titans	21	4	16
2024	Gold Coast Titans	24	3	12
2025	Gold Coast Titans	23	2	8
2026	Gold Coast Titans	14	1	4
	Total	111	13	52

*denotes season competing
