= Brodie Jones =

Australian rugby league footballer

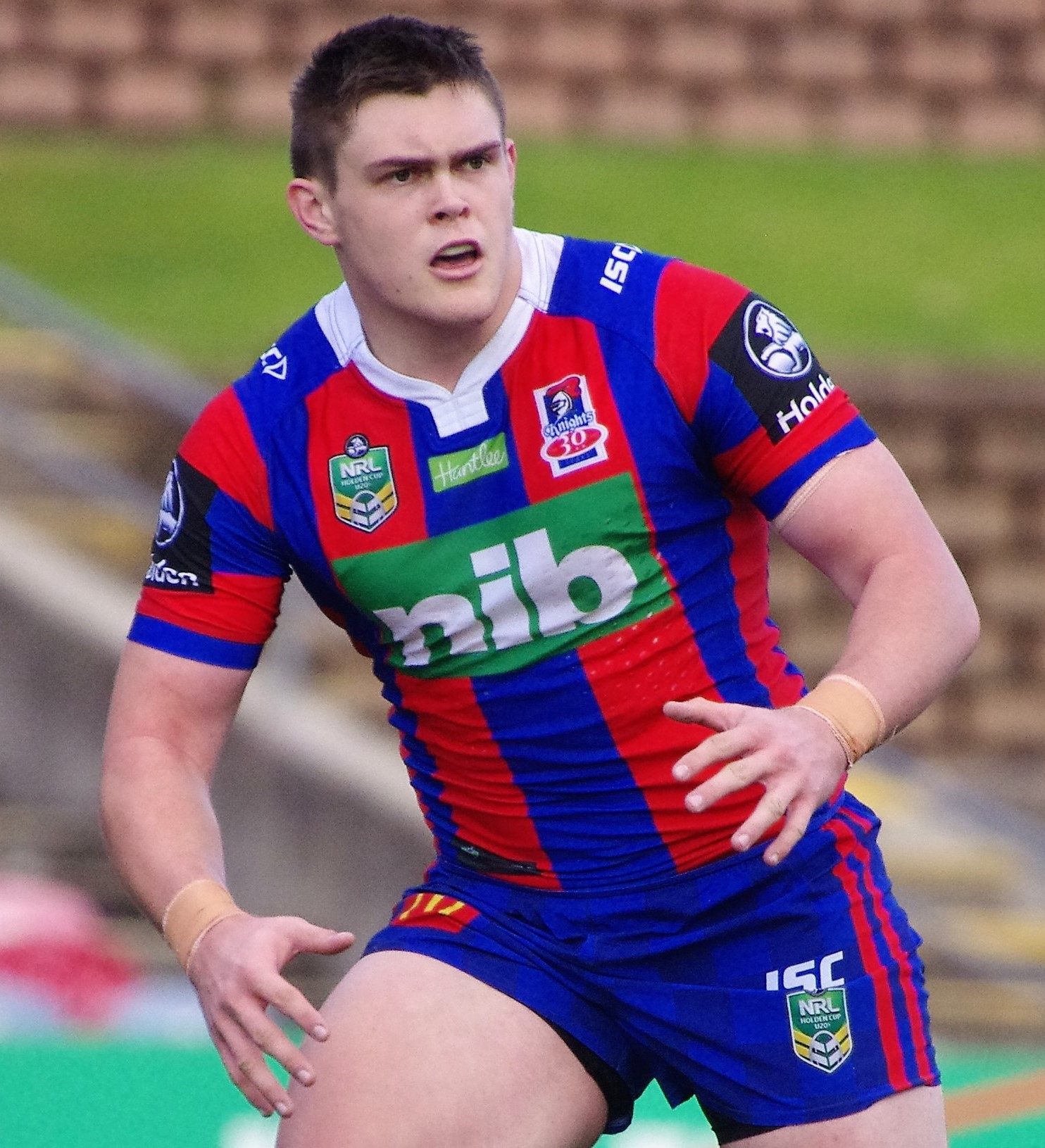

Personal information
- Born: 7 May 1998 (age 28) Maitland, New South Wales, Australia
- Height: 183 cm (6 ft 0 in)
- Weight: 103 kg (16 st 3 lb)

Playing information
- Position: Second-row, Prop
Club
Years	Team	Pld	T	G	FG	P
2020–26	Newcastle Knights	92	7	0	0	28
- Source: As of 9 August 2026

Brodie Jones (born 7 May 1998) is a retired Australian professional rugby league footballer who plays as a second-row forward for the Newcastle Knights in the NRL.

== Background ==
Born in Maitland, New South Wales, Jones played his junior rugby league for the Cessnock Goannas, before being signed by the Newcastle Knights.

== Playing career ==
=== Early years ===
Jones started playing for the Newcastle Knights' Harold Matthews Cup team in 2014, representing the New South Wales Under-16's, before moving up to the S. G. Ball Cup side in 2015. He also spent time playing with the Knights' National Youth Competition / Jersey Flegg Cup team from 2015 through to 2018, representing the New South Wales Under-18's in 2015 and 2016. In 2016, he was a part of the Australian Schoolboys squad. In 2019, he graduated to the Newcastle Knights Canterbury Cup NSW team. In November 2019, he re-signed with Newcastle on a one-year contract.

=== 2020 ===
In round 3 of the 2020 NRL season, Jones made his NRL debut for the Newcastle club against the Penrith Panthers.

=== 2021 ===
Jones made 21 appearances for Newcastle in the 2021 NRL season including the clubs elimination final loss against Parramatta.

=== 2022 & 2023 ===
Jones played 13 games for Newcastle in the 2022 NRL season as the club missed the finals. Jones played a total of 11 games for Newcastle in the 2023 NRL season as the club finished 5th on the table. Jones played in Newcastle's 40-10 semi-final loss against the New Zealand Warriors.

=== 2024 ===
Jones played 18 games for Newcastle in the 2024 NRL season as the club finished 8th and qualified for the finals. Jones played in the clubs elimination finals loss against North Queensland.

=== 2025 ===
On 18 February, Newcastle announced that Jones had re-signed with the club until the end of 2026. Jones played 16 games for Newcastle in the 2025 NRL season which saw the club finish last on the table and claim the Wooden Spoon.

=== 2026 ===
In September 2026, Jones announced he would retire from the NRL at the end of the season and pursue an opportunity in golf.

== Statistics ==
Year	Team	Games	Tries	Pts
2020	Newcastle Knights	7		
2021	Newcastle Knights	22	3	12
2022	Newcastle Knights	13		
2023	Newcastle Knights	11		
2024	Newcastle Knights	18	2	8
2025	Newcastle Knights	16	1	4
2026	Newcastle Knights	4		
	Totals	92	6	24
