= Adam O'Brien (rugby league coach) =

Australian rugby league coach

Personal information
- Born: 26 October 1977 (age 49) Goulburn, New South Wales, Australia

Coaching information
Club
Years	Team	Gms	W	D	L	W%
2020–25	Newcastle Knights	145	62	2	81	43
- Source: As of 11 April 2024

Adam O'Brien (born 26 October 1977) is an Australian professional rugby league football coach who was the head coach of the Newcastle Knights in the National Rugby League (NRL).

He was previously an assistant coach at the Melbourne Storm and the Sydney Roosters.

== Coaching career ==
=== Melbourne Storm ===
O'Brien started his professional coaching career as an assistant to Brad Arthur with the Melbourne Storm under-20s side before working as a development coach for Melbourne and spending five years alongside Craig Bellamy as an assistant to the NRL side.

=== Sydney Roosters ===
After 11 years at the Melbourne club, O'Brien joined the Sydney Roosters as an attacking coach under head coach Trent Robinson in 2019. He finished his time with the Roosters as a part of their 2019 NRL Grand Final winning team.

=== Newcastle Knights ===
In September 2019, O'Brien signed a three-year contract to become the Head Coach of the Newcastle Knights starting in 2020. Newcastle demonstrated a marked improvement in performance over previous seasons, finishing in 7th place and reaching the first of week of finals. They finished the year with 11 wins, 1 draw and 9 losses. In February 2021, the Newcastle club extended his contract until the end of 2024.

O'Brien guided Newcastle to a 7th-placed finish in the 2021 NRL season as the club qualified for the finals. In the first week of the 2021 Finals Series, Newcastle were defeated 28–20 by Parramatta in the elimination final which ended their season.

After failing to reach the finals in 2022, O'Brien took Newcastle to the finals in 2023 as the club finished 5th. They would reach the second week of the finals but were eliminated by the New Zealand Warriors.

In the 2024 NRL season, O'Brien guided Newcastle to an 8th-place finish. They would be eliminated in week one of the finals by North Queensland.

In round 14 of the 2025 NRL season, Newcastle came from 16–0 down at half-time against Manly to win the match 26–22 after golden point extra-time. In the post match press conference, O'Brien came under scrutiny for suggesting that Newcastle supporters who booed their team off at the interval knew "nothing about rugby league". Before the match, Newcastle had only recorded two wins from a possible ten games and had been held scoreless at half-time eight times since the start of the season.

On 14 July 2025, it was widely reported that his tenure as head coach of the Newcastle club would conclude at the end of the 2025 regular season. In late August 2025, the Newcastle outfit reportedly called a meeting in which they decided to terminate O'Brien's contract. It was later reported that O'Brien had mutually agreed to depart Newcastle despite being contracted with the club until the end of 2028.

In round 27 of the 2025 NRL season, Newcastle needed to defeat Parramatta in order to avoid the Wooden Spoon after the Gold Coast went above them on the table after their come from behind win against the Wests Tigers. Newcastle would lose the match 66–10 in O'Brien's final game in charge which meant Newcastle would receive the wooden spoon for a fifth time. The loss also confirmed that Newcastle had lost nine matches in a row to close out the year. Under O'Brien's tenure in 2025, Newcastle also were held scoreless in eleven matches at half-time and only won one match at home.

=== Head coaching Statistics ===
Team	Year	Regular Season					Finals			
Team	Year	Won	Lost	Ties	Win %	Finish	Won	Lost	Win %	Result
	2020	11	8	1	.575	7th of 16	0	1	.000	Lost to South Sydney Rabbitohs in Elimination Final
	2021	12	12	0	.500	7th of 16	0	1	.000	Lost to Parramatta Eels in Elimination Final
	2022	6	18	0	.250	14th of 16	—	—	—	Missed Finals
	2023	14	9	1	.604	5th of 17	1	1	.500	Lost to New Zealand Warriors in Semi Final
	2024	12	12	0	.500	8th of 17	0	1	.000	Lost to North Queensland Cowboys in Elimination Final
	2025	6	18	0	.273	17th of 17	-	-	-	Missed Finals
Total		62	80	2	.438		1	4	.200	

== Controversy ==
On 10 February 2021, O'Brien was named as the person involved in an alleged incident at a Newcastle racecourse. It was alleged that O'Brien had the altercation in one of the toilet blocks at the racecourse and had to be ejected from the venue by security. One security guard spoke to the media about the incident saying “The coach was arrogant and belligerent and even used the old, ‘Don’t you know who I am?’ line when we escorted him out of the men's room and told him to cool it". This was later refuted by the Newcastle club in a statement which read "Reports alleging those Knights staff were intoxicated, disruptive and ejected from the venue are incorrect. This has been confirmed by NJC staff and independent eyewitnesses. Information gathered confirms all Knights representatives always acted professionally and appropriately, NJC has confirmed there were no incident reports recorded."
