= Sauaso Sue =

Samoa international rugby league footballer

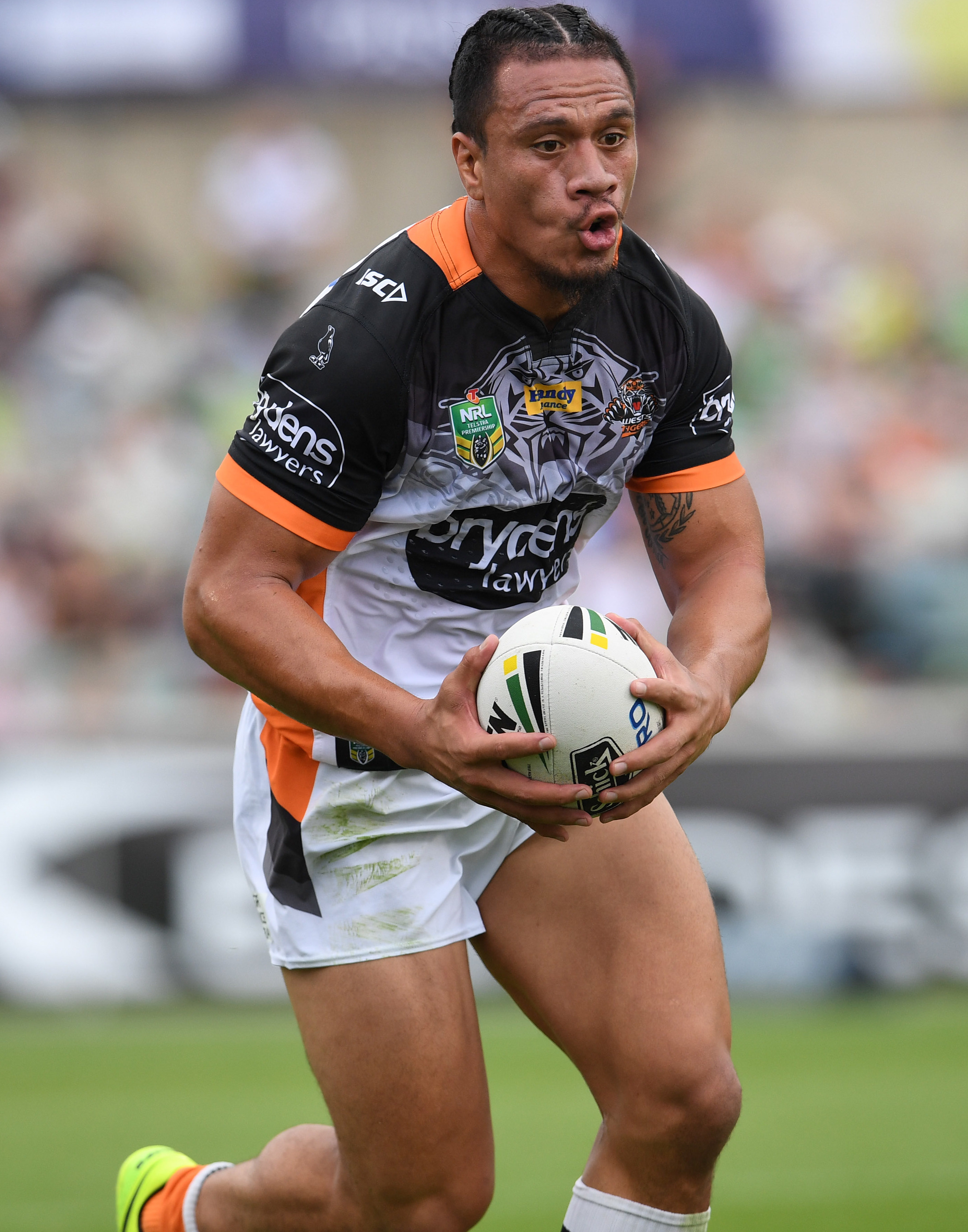

Personal information
- Full name: Sauaso Sue
- Born: 20 April 1992 (age 34) Ōtāhuhu, Auckland, New Zealand
- Height: 6 ft 2 in (1.88 m)
- Weight: 16 st 7 lb (105 kg)

Playing information
- Position: Prop, Loose forward, Second-row
Club
Years	Team	Pld	T	G	FG	P
2013–18	Wests Tigers	116	10	0	0	40
2019–20	Canterbury Bulldogs	26	1	0	0	4
2021–22	Newcastle Knights	30	2	0	0	8
2023–	Hull Kingston Rovers	104	15	0	0	60
	Total	276	28	0	0	112
Representative
Years	Team	Pld	T	G	FG	P
2013–17	Samoa	10	1	0	0	4
- Source: As of 19 September 2026

Sauaso "Jesse" Sue (born 20 April 1992) is a Samoan international rugby league footballer who plays as a prop, loose forward and second-row forward for Hull Kingston Rovers in the Super League.

He previously played for the Wests Tigers, Canterbury-Bankstown Bulldogs and Newcastle Knights in the National Rugby League.

== Early years ==
Sue was born in Ōtāhuhu, New Zealand, and is of Samoan descent.

Sue moved to Australia as a 2-year old and attended James Meehan High School located in Sydney's south west. Sue played his junior football for the Macquarie Fields Hawks before being signed by the Wests Tigers.

Sue played for the Wests Tigers NYC team in 2011 and 2012, and was a member of the team that won the grand final in 2012. In October 2012, Sue played for the Junior Kiwis.

== Playing career ==
=== 2013 ===
In Round 6 of the 2013 NRL season Sue made his NRL debut for the Wests Tigers against the St. George Illawarra Dragons off the interchange bench in the Tigers 13-12 loss at SCG. He was a regular in first grade for the rest of the season, playing in 17 games, and was one of the Wests Tigers most effective defenders. Coach Mick Potter said, "His defence is outstanding but what is even more impressive is that he wins the tackles. He doesn't get beaten on the ground. As well as being aggressive he dominates his tackles and that comes from his leg-drive and his strength." In Round 14 against the Brisbane Broncos, Sue scored his first NRL career, and only season, try.

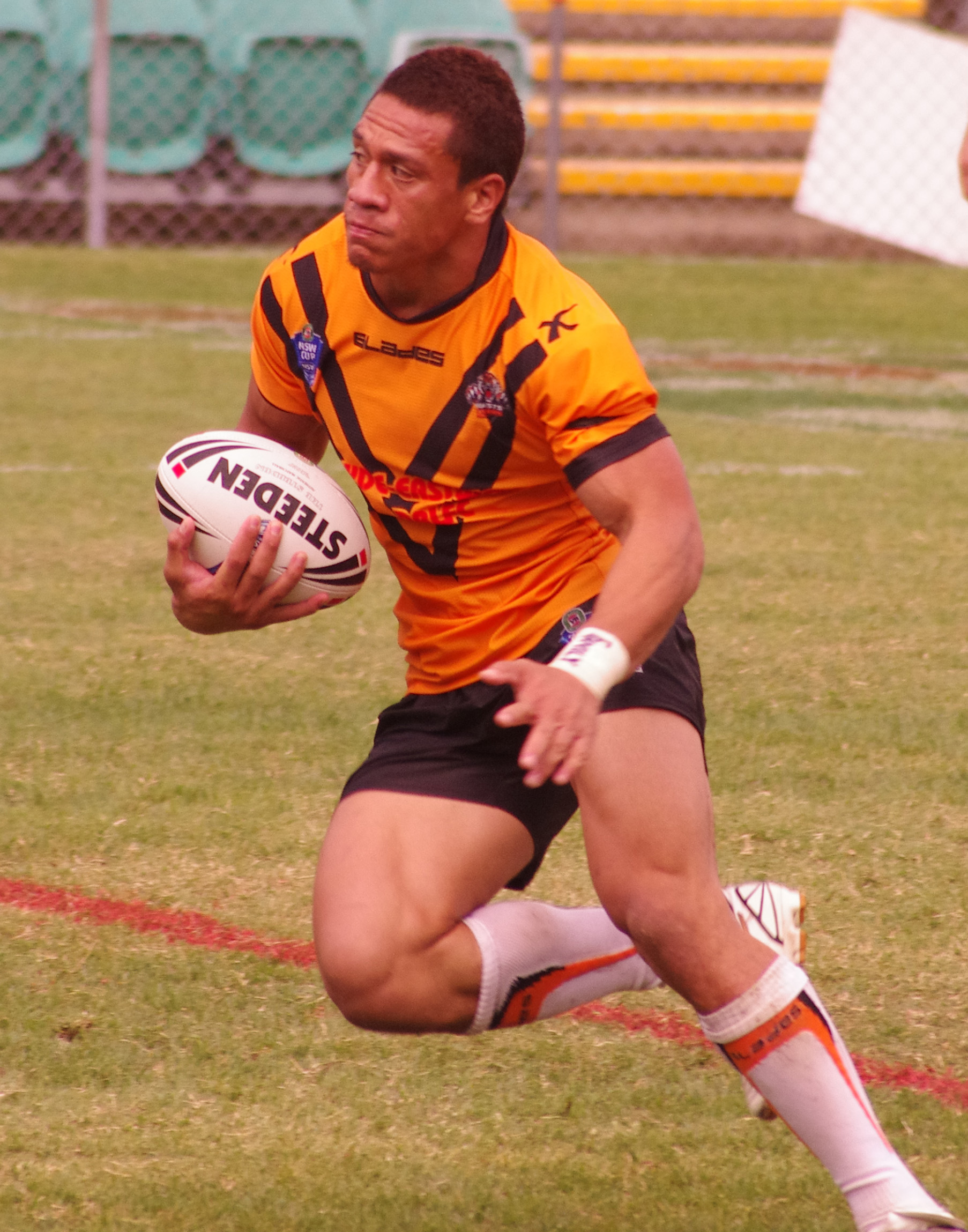
Jesse Sue playing for the Tigers in 2013

At the end of the regular season, Sue was selected at international level for the Samoans in the 2013 World Cup. Sue appeared in all 4 games that the Samoans played at the tournament, scoring a try against Papua New Guinea.

=== 2014 ===
Sue played in 18 matches for the season. In September, he was selected for the New Zealand national rugby league team, and Samoa Four Nations train-on squads. He was subsequently selected in the Samoan final 24 man squad. On 23 October, Sue alongside Samoa teammates Reni Maitua and Tautau Moga were fined $10,000 for their involvement in a brawl in at a nightclub at Fortitude Valley. The trio were dropped for 2 matches but later returned to play against New Zealand in Samoa's 16-12 loss at Toll Stadium in Whangarei, New Zealand. Sue later said, "It was the worst experience I had ever gone through to that point. There’s a little scuffle, a push and shove outside the club and Reni and I were walking past together. The coppers were trying to sort it out and they were pushing everyone around. Then a copper tackled us from behind and before we knew it we were locked up in Brisbane."

=== 2015 ===
On 23 January 2015, Sue was named in the Wests Tigers 2015 Auckland Nines squad. On 2 May 2015, Sue played for Samoa in the 2015 Polynesian Cup. He played a personal best 23 games for the Wests Tigers, only missing one game due to a shoulder injury, and had stints starting at both prop and as a second-rower.

=== 2016 ===
In February, Sue played for the Tigers in the 2016 NRL Auckland Nines. On 7 May, he played for Samoa against Tonga in the 2016 Polynesian Cup, and represented them again in a test against Fiji in October. For Wests Tigers, Sue began the season playing at lock. By the end of the season, he was starting in the front row with mid-season transfer Elijah Taylor playing at lock. In round 25, Sue scored his first ever double in a game against the Warriors, taking his season total to a personal-best 4 tries from 21 matches.

=== 2017 ===
Missing 2 games through suspension, Sue played 24 games for the season, scoring 4 tries. At season's end, he declined the chance to play in the World Cup to get married.

=== 2018 ===
On 13 August, Sue signed a two-year deal to join Canterbury-Bankstown for the 2019 season.

=== 2019 ===
Sue made his debut for Canterbury-Bankstown against the New Zealand Warriors in Round 1 which ended in a 40-6 defeat. Following a Round 2 loss against rivals Parramatta which ended in another heavy defeat, Sue was demoted to reserve grade by coach Dean Pay.

In Round 5, Sue was recalled to the Canterbury side as the club were defeated 40-4 by St George. Sue scored his first try for Canterbury in Round 11 against Melbourne which ended in a 28-6 defeat at Belmore Sports Ground.

In Round 17 against Newcastle, Sue was taken from the field during Canterbury's 20-14 win with an injury. Scans later revealed that Sue had torn his anterior cruciate ligament (ACL) and he was ruled out for the rest of the season.

=== 2020 ===
On 22 September, Sue was one of eight players who were told by Canterbury that their services would not be required at the club in 2021. In November, he signed a 2-year contract with the Newcastle Knights starting in 2021.

=== 2021 ===
In round 13 of the 2021 NRL season, Sue was sent to the sin bin for a late tackle on Reed Mahoney during the club's 40-4 loss against Parramatta. He made a total of 23 appearances throughout the season for Newcastle including their elimination finals loss to Parramatta.

=== 2022 ===
Sue appeared in seven games for Newcastle throughout the season.

In July, Sue signed a three-year contract with English Super League side Hull Kingston Rovers starting in 2023.

=== 2023 ===
Sue made his club debut for Hull Kingston Rovers in round 1 of the 2023 Super League season as they upset Wigan 27-18. Sue played 14 games for Hull Kingston Rovers in the 2023 Super League season as the club finished fourth on the table and qualified for the playoffs.

=== 2024 ===
On 12 October, Sue played in Hull Kingston Rovers 2024 Super League Grand Final loss against Wigan.

=== 2025 ===
On 7 June, Sue played in Hull Kingston Rovers 8-6 Challenge Cup final victory over Warrington. It was the club's first major trophy in 40 years. On 10 June, Sue was found not guilty of a spitting charge during Hull Kingston Rovers Challenge Cup final victory. Sue would have been suspended for six matches if found guilty. On 18 September, Sue played in Hull Kingston Rovers victory over Warrington in the last game of the season were the club lifted the League Leaders Shield On 9 October, Sue played in Hull Kingston Rovers 2025 Super League Grand Final victory over Wigan.

=== 2026 ===
On 19 February, Sue played in Hull Kingston Rovers World Club Challenge victory against Brisbane.

== Statistics ==
Year	Team	Games	Tries	Pts
2013	Wests Tigers	17	1	4
2014	Wests Tigers	18		
2015	Wests Tigers	23	1	4
2016	Wests Tigers	21	4	16
2017	Wests Tigers	22	4	16
2018	Wests Tigers	15		
2019	Canterbury-Bankstown Bulldogs	11	1	4
2020	Canterbury-Bankstown Bulldogs	15		
2021	Newcastle Knights	23	2	8
2022	Newcastle Knights	7		
2023	Hull Kingston Rovers	15	1	4
2024	Hull Kingston Rovers	31	7	28
2025	Hull Kingston Rovers	30	4	16
2026	Hull Kingston Rovers	10	3	12
	Totals	268	28	112
