= Chris Vea'ila =

New Zealand professional rugby league player

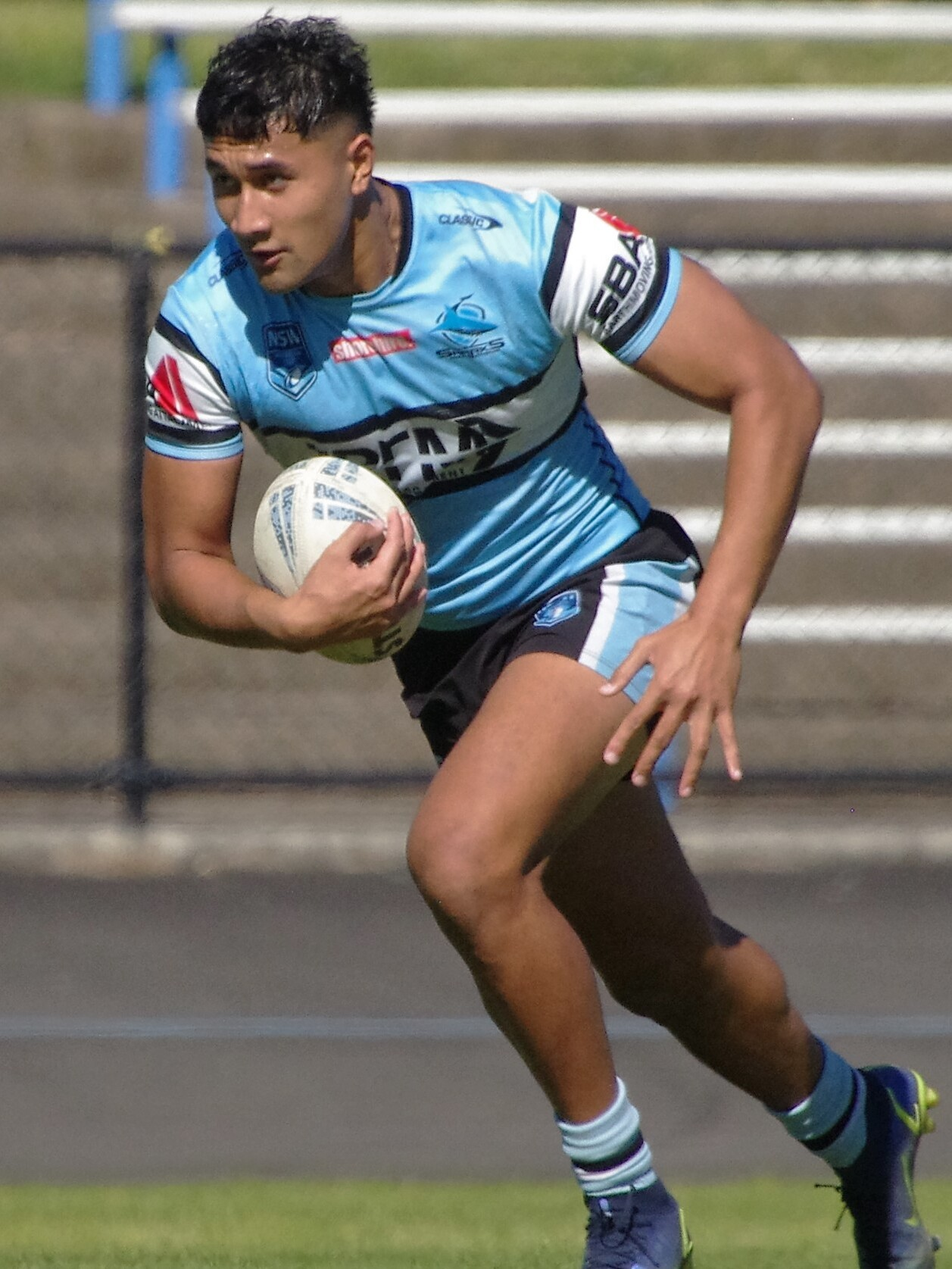

Personal information
- Full name: Christopher Vea'ila
- Born: 24 February 2003 (age 23) Auckland, New Zealand
- Height: 186 cm (6 ft 1 in)
- Weight: 97 kg (15 st 4 lb)

Playing information
- Position: Centre, Wing
Club
Years	Team	Pld	T	G	FG	P
2025–26	Cronulla Sharks	2	1	0	0	4
2027–	Perth Bears	0	0	0	0	0
	Total	2	1	0	0	4
- Source: As of 20 October 2026

Chris Vea'ila (born 24 February 2003) is a New Zealand rugby league footballer who plays as a centre for the Perth Bears in the National Rugby League.

== Background ==
Vei'la was born in Auckland and is of Tongan descent. He played his junior rugby league for the Waitemata Seagulls and Pt Chevalier Pirates before being signed by the Newcastle Knights when he was 14.

== Playing career ==
=== Early career ===
Vea'ila spent several seasons in the Knights' junior representative system, winning the Harold Matthews Cup with the club in 2019. From 2020 to 2022, he played for the club's SG Ball Cup side.

In 2023, while playing for Newcastle's Jersey Flegg Cup side, he made a mid-season move to the Cronulla Sharks.

In 2024, he became a regular for the Newtown Jets in the NSW Cup, starting at centre in their Grand Final win over the North Sydney Bears.

=== 2025 ===
On 8 May, Vea'ila re-signed with the Sharks until the end of the 2026 season.

In Round 20 of the 2025 NRL season, Vea'ila made his NRL debut, scoring a try in the Sharks' 31–18 win over the Sydney Roosters.

=== 2026 ===
On 12 January, it was reported that Vea'ila had signed a deal with the Perth Bears from 2027. It was confirmed hours later that Vea'ila had signed for two years. On 26 September, he played for Newtown in their NSW Cup Grand Final loss against Penrith.
