= Blake Green =

Australian rugby league footballer

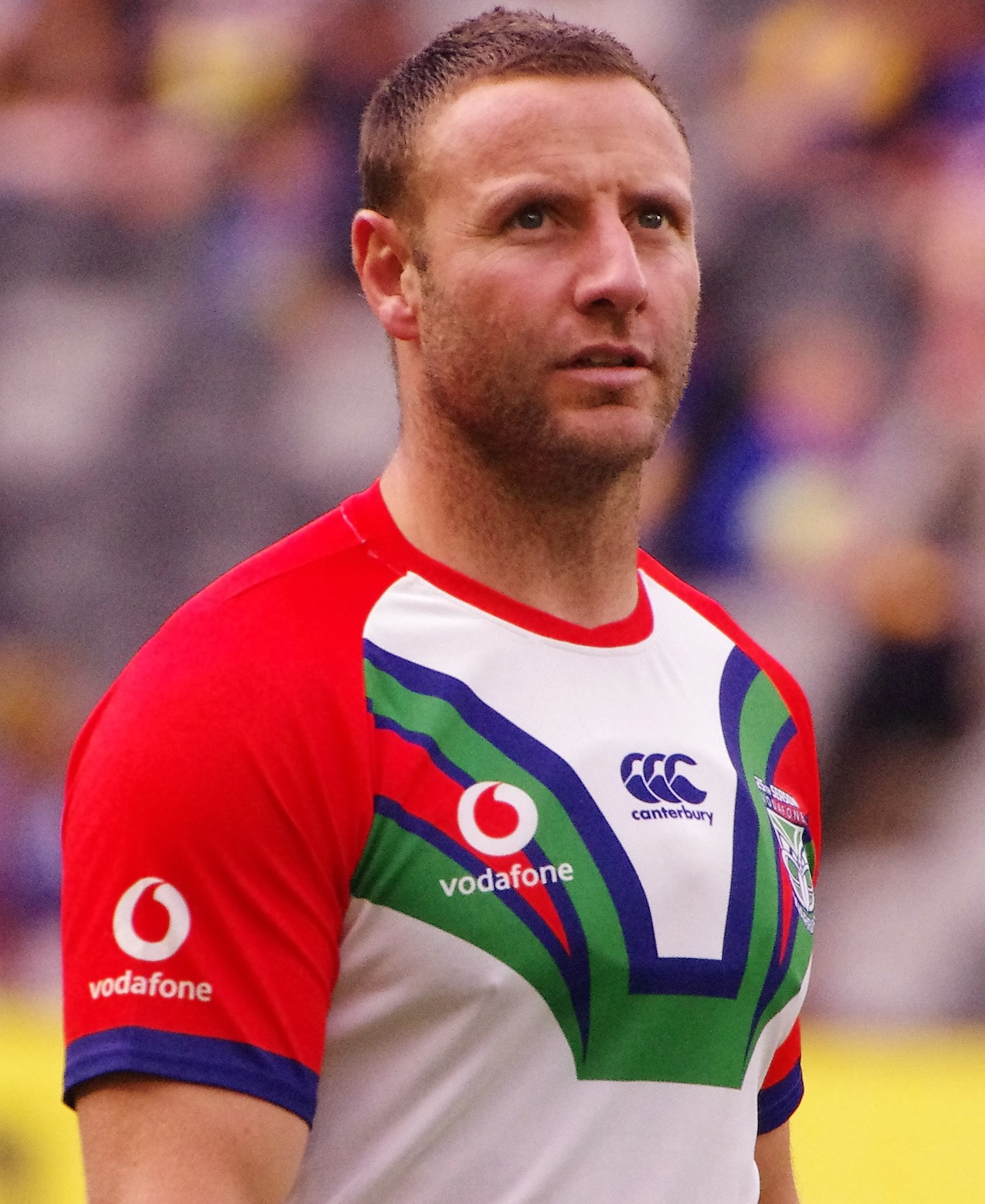

Personal information
- Born: 19 September 1986 (age 40) Fairfield, New South Wales

Playing information
- Height: 179 cm (5 ft 10 in)
- Weight: 97 kg (15 st 4 lb)
- Position: Five-eighth, Halfback
Club
Years	Team	Pld	T	G	FG	P
2007	Parramatta Eels	6	0	0	0	0
2008–09	Cronulla Sharks	19	1	0	0	4
2010	Canterbury Bulldogs	18	2	0	0	8
2011–12	Hull Kingston Rovers	40	18	0	0	72
2013–14	Wigan Warriors	49	18	0	0	72
2015–16	Melbourne Storm	50	10	0	0	40
2017	Manly Sea Eagles	24	3	0	0	12
2018–20	New Zealand Warriors	55	4	0	1	17
2020–21	Newcastle Knights	9	0	0	0	0
	Total	270	56	0	1	225

Blake Green (born 19 September 1986) is an Australian former professional rugby league footballer who played as a five-eighth and halfback in the 2000s, 2010s, and 2020s.

Green was regarded as somewhat of a journeyman during his career after playing for nine separate clubs. He played for the Parramatta Eels, Cronulla-Sutherland Sharks and Canterbury-Bankstown Bulldogs in the National Rugby League, Hull Kingston Rovers and the Wigan Warriors in the Super League, before returning to the NRL with the Melbourne Storm, Manly Warringah Sea Eagles, New Zealand Warriors and finally Newcastle Knights. He is one of only three players in the history of the game (the others being Darrien Doherty and Tyran Smith) to have the distinction of playing first grade for seven different NRL clubs.

Green won the Harry Sunderland Trophy as man-of-the-match in the 2013 Super League Grand Final whilst playing for the Wigan Warriors.

== Background ==
Green was born in Fairfield, New South Wales, Australia.

He played junior rugby league for Cabramatta Two Blues and Hills District Bulls.

Blake was educated at Westfields Sports High School from 1999–2004 and played for and captained the 2004 Australian Schoolboys.

== Playing career ==
Green made his professional rugby league début during the 2007 NRL season with the Parramatta Eels.

He was then signed up by the Cronulla-Sutherland Sharks on a two-year deal.

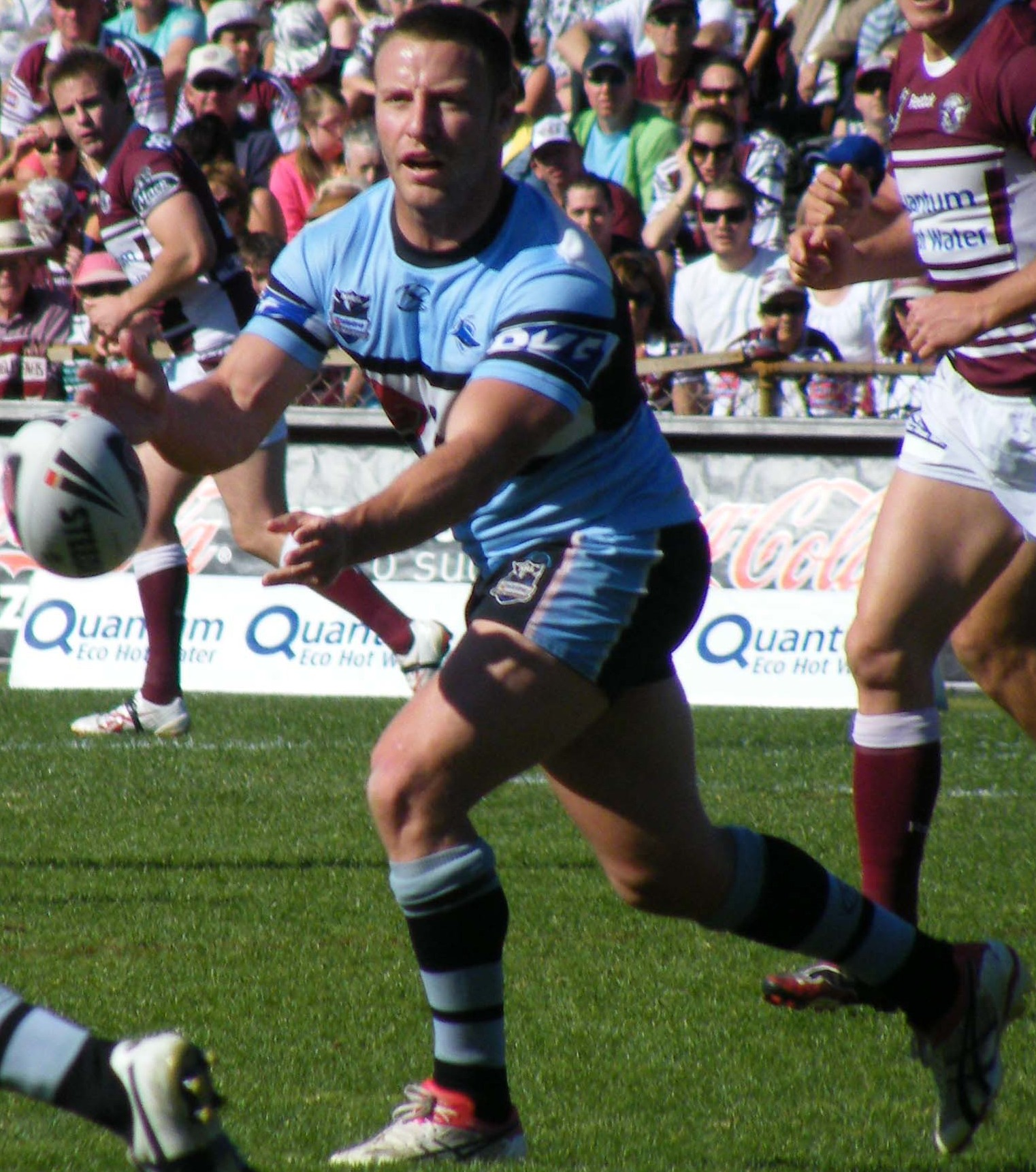
Green playing for the Sharks in 2009

He moved to the Canterbury-Bankstown Bulldogs in 2010, enjoying his most consistent season to that point, playing 18 games in the halves.

In October 2010 it was announced that Green had signed a two-year deal with the East Riding of Yorkshire club Hull Kingston Rovers, starting from the 2011 Super League season. Green linked up with former teammate Michael Dobson to form a new partnership at half-back for the Robins.

He played in the 2013 Challenge Cup Final victory over Hull F.C. at Wembley Stadium.

Green won the Harry Sunderland Trophy in the 2013 Super League Grand Final against the Warrington Wolves on 5 October 2013 as he helped the Wigan Warriors come from 16–2 down to win 30–16 as he scored the try which moved the Wigan Warriors 24–16 ahead in a crucial stage of the game, and put on a fantastic display at stand off despite taking a cheap-shot on the ground from Warrington Wolves' Ben Westwood which left Green on the ground out cold for a few minutes with a black eye and fractured eye socket at Old Trafford.

On 10 June 2014, Green announced he would leave the Wigan Warriors at the end of the season.

He played in the 2014 Super League Grand Final defeat by St. Helens at Old Trafford.

On returning to the NRL he signed with Melbourne in 2015. In the 2016 NRL season, Green played nearly every match for Melbourne as the club claimed the Minor Premiership. Green played for Melbourne in the 2016 NRL Grand Final where they lost 14-12 to Cronulla-Sutherland at ANZ Stadium.

Green then signed with the Manly Warringah Sea Eagles for a two-year deal, forming a halves combination with Daly Cherry-Evans.

On 20 November 2017, Green was released from the second and final year of his contract with Manly to join the New Zealand Warriors on a three-year deal.

On 4 August 2020, Green joined the Newcastle Knights mid-season to play out the rest of the 2020 season. Upon joining Newcastle, Green equalled both Darrien Doherty and Tyran Smith's record for most NRL club's played for with Newcastle being his seventh club. He played his first game for the club in round 13 against the Wests Tigers, with the Knights winning the game 44-4. During his third game for the Knights against the North Queensland Cowboys, Green ruptured his anterior cruciate ligament, ending his season.

On 26 August 2020, Green signed a one-year contract with the Canterbury-Bankstown Bulldogs for the 2021 season. He was then released from his contract with Canterbury-Bankstown, after they had signed Kyle Flanagan, with Green returning to Newcastle on a one-year deal for 2021.

Green made his return to the field for the Newcastle club in round 4 of the 2021 season. He played in five more games before announcing his immediate retirement from rugby league.

=== Honours ===
2004 – Australia national schoolboys rugby league team
2013 – Winner Super League Grand Final – Wigan Warriors
2013 – Winner Harry Sunderland Trophy – Wigan Warriors
2013 – Winner Challenge Cup – Wigan Warriors
2014 – Runner-up Super League Grand Final – Wigan Warriors
2016 – NRL Minor Premiers – Melbourne Storm
2016 – Runner-up NRL Grand Final – Melbourne Storm

== Coaching career ==
On 11 June 2021, Green was appointed as the head coach for the inaugural Newcastle Knights NRLW team, one of the 3 new clubs competing in 2021 NRLW Premiership. Ultimately, Green never had the opportunity to coach the Knights' NRLW team, instead accepting a role with the Knights' NRL team before the delayed 2021 NRL Women's season commenced.

On 3 November 2025, the Cowboys announced that Green joined the coaching staff as an assistant.
