= 2021 Gold Coast Titans season =

NRL rugby league season

- NRL Rank: 8th
- Play-off result: Loss elimination final
- 2021 record: Wins: 10; losses: 14
- Points scored: For: 604; against: 442

Team information
- CEO: Steve Mitchell
- Coach: Justin Holbrook
- Captain: Kevin Proctor Jamal Fogarty
- Stadium: Cbus Super Stadium
- Avg. attendance: 12,439
- High attendance: 17,822

Top scorers
- Tries: David Fifita (17)
- Goals: Jamal Fogarty (70)
- Points: Jamal Fogarty (156)
← 2020	List of seasons	2022 →

The 2021 Gold Coast Titans Season is the 15th season competing in the 2021 NRL season. The team is coached by Justin Holbrook who is coaching for his 2nd consecutive season. On 26 February 2021, the Titans Coach announced that Kevin Proctor and Jamal Fogarty would co-captain the Titans through 2021.

== Fixtures ==
=== Pre-season ===
Date	Round	Opponent	Venue	Result	Score	GCT. Tries	GCT. Goals	Report
27 February	Trial	New Zealand Warriors	Oakes Oval, Lismore	Draw	12-12	Tino Fa'asusmaleaui (1), Jarrod Wallace (1)	Jamal Fogarty 2/2	
Legend: Win Loss Draw Bye

=== Regular season ===
Date	Round	Opponent	Venue/Attendance	Result	GCT.	Opp.	Tries	Goals	Field goals	Report
13 March	1	New Zealand Warriors	Central Coast Stadium, Gosford; Attendance: 3,771	Loss	6	19	Corey Thompson (1)	Jamal Fogarty 1/1		
19 March	2	Brisbane Broncos	Robina Stadium, Gold Coast; Attendance: 17,822	Win	28	16	David Fifita (2); Jarrod Wallace (1); Erin Clark (1); Jaimin Jolliffe (1)	Jamal Fogarty 4/5		
28 March	3	North Queensland Cowboys	North Queensland Stadium, Townsville; Attendance: 0	Win	44	8	Alexander Brimson (2); Corey Thompson (2); Phillip Sami (1); Moeaki Fotuaika (1); David Fifita (1)	Jamal Fogarty 8/8		
3 April	4	Canberra Raiders	Jubilee Oval, Sydney; Attendance: 5,117	Loss	4	20	Corey Thompson (1)	Jamal Fogarty 0/1		
10 April	5	Newcastle Knights	Robina Stadium, Gold Coast; Attendance: 12,492	Win	42	16	David Fifita (3); Corey Thompson (2); Patrick Herbert (2); Kevin Proctor (1)	Jamal Fogarty 5/8		
17 April	6	Manly Warringah Sea Eagles	Glen Willow Oval, Mudgee; Attendance: 6,380	Loss	0	36				
23 April	7	South Sydney Rabbitohs	Robina Stadium, Gold Coast; Attendance: 17,383	Loss	30	40	David Fifita (3); Jamal Fogarty (1); Tyrone Peachey (1)	Jamal Fogarty 5/5		
30 April	8	Brisbane Broncos	Lang Park, Brisbane; Attendance: 21,322	Loss	28	36	Kevin Proctor (1); Corey Thompson (1); Alexander Brimson (1); Tyrone Peachey (1); Mitch Rein (1)	Jamal Fogarty 4/5		
8 May	9	Wests Tigers	Campbelltown Stadium, Sydney; Attendance: 8,411	Win	36	28	Phillip Sami (2); Tanah Boyd (1); Beau Fermor (1); Brian Kelly (1); Tyrone Peachey (1)	Jamal Fogarty 6/6		
16 May	10	Penrith Panthers	Lang Park, Brisbane; Attendance: 43,537	Loss	48	12	AJ Brimson (1); Beau Fermor (1)	Jamal Fogarty 2/2		
22 May	11	Canterbury Bulldogs	Robina Stadium, Gold Coast; Attendance: 11,315	Win	30	20	Alexander Brimson (2); Tino Fa'asuamaleaui (1); Phillip Sami (1); Jarrod Wallace (1)	Jamal Fogarty 5/5		
30 May	12	Cronulla Sharks	Central Coast Stadium, Gosford; Attendance: 7,362	Loss	10	38	Brian Kelly (1); Kevin Proctor (1)	Jamal Fogarty 1/2		
5 June	13	Melbourne Storm	Sunshine Coast Stadium, Sunshine Coast; Attendance: 7,630	Loss	14	20	Brian Kelly (1); Greg Marzhew (1); Jarrod Wallace (1)	Jamal Fogarty 5/6		
12 June	14	Sydney Roosters	Robina Stadium, Gold Coast; Attendance: 15,111	Loss	34	35	Jamal Fogarty (2); Tino Fa'asuamaleaui (1); Brian Kelly (1); Tyrone Peachey (1); Kevin Proctor (1)			
20 June	15	Manly Warringah Sea Eagles	Robina Stadium, Gold Coast; Attendance: 14,408	Loss	24	56	Greg Marzhew (2); Jayden Campbell (1); David Fifita (1); Patrick Herbert (1)	Jamal Fogarty 2/5		
3 July	16	Canberra Raiders	Canberra Stadium, Canberra; Attendance: 7,646	Win	44	6	Kevin Proctor (2); David Fifita (1); Jamal Fogarty (1); Moeaki Fotuaika (1); Patrick Herbert (1); Brian Kelly (1); Phillip Sami (1)	Jamal Fogarty 6/8		
16 July	18	Parramatta Eels	Robina Stadium, Gold Coast; Attendance: 15,038	Loss	8	26	David Fifita (1); Brian Kelly (1)	Patrick Herbert 0/2		
25 July	19	St. George Illawarra Dragons	Robina Stadium, Gold Coast; Attendance: 4,424	Win	32	10	Jarrod Wallace (2); David Fifita (1); Greg Marzhew (1); Toby Sexton (1)	Toby Sexton 6/6		
2 August	20	Canterbury Bulldogs	Robina Stadium, Gold Coast; Attendance: 0	Win	6	34	Brian Kelly (2); Tino Fa'asuamaleaui (1); Esan Marsters (1); Greg Marzhew (1); Ashley Taylor (1)	Toby Sexton 5/6		
8 August	21	North Queensland Cowboys	Robina Stadium, Gold Coast; Attendance: 0	Win	36	14	Brian Kelly (2); Alexander Brimson (1); Beau Fermor (1); David Fifita (1); Ashley Taylor	Toby Sexton 4/7		
14 August	22	South Sydney Rabbitohs	Robina Stadium, Gold Coast; Attendance: 4,117	Loss	6	36	Corey Thompson (1)	Toby Sexton 1/1		
19 August	23	Melbourne Storm	Robina Stadium, Gold Coast; Attendance: 8,288	Loss	20	34	Jayden Campbell (2); Greg Marzhew (1); Tyrone Peachey (1)	Jamal Fogarty 2/4		
26 August	24	Newcastle Knights	Sunshine Coast Stadium, Sunshine Coast; Attendance: 2,107	Loss	14	15	David Fifita (1); Phillip Sami (1)	Jamal Fogarty 3/4		
5 September	25	New Zealand Warriors	Robina Stadium, Gold Coast; Attendance: 12,532	Win	44	0	Jayden Campbell (2); David Fifita (2); Moeaki Fotuaika (1); Patrick Herbert (1); Brian Kelly (1); Mitch Rein (1)	Jamal Fogarty 6/8		
11 September	Finals week 1	Sydney Roosters	Townsville Stadium, Townsville; Attendance: 15,237	Loss	24	25	Tino Fa'asuamaleaui (1); Beau Fermor (1); Brian Kelly (1); Jarrod Wallace (1)	Jamal Fogarty 4/5		
Legend: Win Loss Draw Bye
