= 2021 NRL season =

Australian rugby league season

2021 National Rugby League
- Duration: March 11 – October 3, 2021
- Teams: 16
- Premiers: Penrith Panthers (3rd title)
- Minor premiers: Melbourne Storm (5th title)
- Matches played: 201
- Points scored: 9,219
- Average attendance: 10,364 (Note: Some games in Rounds 16, 17, 20 and 21 were played to empty venues as a result of COVID-19 biosecurity protocols.)
- Total attendance: 2,083,258 (Note: Some games in Rounds 16, 17, 20 and 21 were played to empty venues as a result of COVID-19 biosecurity protocols.)
- Top points scorer: Reuben Garrick (334)
- Wooden spoon: Canterbury-Bankstown Bulldogs (6th spoon)
- Dally M Medal: Tom Trbojevic
- Top try-scorer: Alex Johnston (30)

The 2021 NRL season was the 114th season of professional rugby league in Australia and the 24th season run by the National Rugby League.

== Teams ==
The lineup of teams remained unchanged for the 15th consecutive year.

| Colours | Club | Season | Home ground(s) | Head coach | Captain(s) |
|---|---|---|---|---|---|
| | Brisbane Broncos | 34th season | Suncorp Stadium | Kevin Walters | Alex Glenn |
| | Canberra Raiders | 40th season | GIO Stadium Canberra | Ricky Stuart | Jarrod Croker & Josh Hodgson |
| | Canterbury-Bankstown Bulldogs | 87th season | Stadium Australia & Bankwest Stadium | Trent Barrett | Josh Jackson |
| | Cronulla-Sutherland Sharks | 55th season | Netstrata Jubilee Stadium | ~~John Morris~~ → Josh Hannay (interim) | Wade Graham |
| | Gold Coast Titans | 15th season | Cbus Super Stadium | Justin Holbrook | Kevin Proctor & Jamal Fogarty |
| | Manly Warringah Sea Eagles | 72nd season | 4 Pines Park | Des Hasler | Daly Cherry-Evans |
| | Melbourne Storm | 24th season | AAMI Park | Craig Bellamy | Jesse Bromwich & Dale Finucane |
| | Newcastle Knights | 34th season | McDonald Jones Stadium | Adam O'Brien | Daniel Saifiti & Jayden Brailey |
| | New Zealand Warriors | 27th season | Central Coast Stadium | Nathan Brown | Roger Tuivasa-Sheck |
| | North Queensland Cowboys | 27th season | Queensland Country Bank Stadium | Todd Payten | ~~Michael Morgan~~ → Jason Taumalolo |
| | Parramatta Eels | 75th season | Bankwest Stadium | Brad Arthur | Clint Gutherson |
| | Penrith Panthers | 55th season | BlueBet Stadium | Ivan Cleary | Isaah Yeo & Nathan Cleary |
| | South Sydney Rabbitohs | 112th season | Stadium Australia | Wayne Bennett | Adam Reynolds |
| | St. George Illawarra Dragons | 23rd season | Netstrata Jubilee Stadium & WIN Stadium | Anthony Griffin | Ben Hunt |
| | Sydney Roosters | 114th season | Sydney Cricket Ground | Trent Robinson | ~~Jake Friend~~ → James Tedesco |
| | Wests Tigers | 22nd season | Leichhardt Oval, Campbelltown Stadium & Bankwest Stadium | Michael Maguire | James Tamou |

== Regular season ==
| Team | 1 | 2 | 3 | 4 | 5 | 6 | 7 | 8 | 9 | 10 | 11 | 12 | 13 | 14 | 15 | 16 | 17 | 18 | 19 | 20 | 21 | 22 | 23 | 24 | 25 | F1 | F2 | F3 | GF |
|---|---|---|---|---|---|---|---|---|---|---|---|---|---|---|---|---|---|---|---|---|---|---|---|---|---|---|---|---|---|
| Brisbane Broncos | **PAR** **−8** | GCT −12 | **CBY** **+24** | MEL −34 | SOU −29 | **PEN** **−8** | PAR −40 | **GCT** **+8** | NQL −1 | **MAN** **−44** | SYD +18 | **MEL** **−28** | SGI −28 | CAN −22 | **SOU** **−46** | **CRO** **+8** | X | **WTI** **−18** | **PEN** **−6** | **NQL** **+19** | **NEW** **−8** | **SYD** **−1** | **NZL** **+2** | **CRO** **−8** | **NEW** **+13** | | | | |
| Canberra Raiders | **WTI** **+18** | CRO +2 | **NZL** **−3** | GCT +16 | PEN −20 | **PAR** **−25** | NQL −2 | **SOU** **−14** | NEW −8 | CBY +2 | **MEL** **−24** | SYD −28 | X | **BRI** **+22** | SGI −2 | **GCT** **−38** | MAN +14 | **CRO** **+16** | PAR +2 | NEW −10 | **SGI** **+8** | MEL −10 | **MAN** **−1** | **NZL** **+12** | **SYD** **−24** | | | | |
| Canterbury-Bankstown Bulldogs | NEW −16 | **PEN** **−28** | BRI −24 | **SOU** **−38** | **MEL** **−34** | NQL −12 | CRO +6 | **PAR** **−22** | SGI −20 | **CAN** **−2** | GCT −10 | PEN −26 | X | **SGI** **+22** | PAR −26 | **MAN** **−66** | **SYD** **−6** | **SOU** **−8** | **CRO** **−20** | GCT −28 | **WTI** **−12** | **NZL** **−14** | **NEW** **−6** | MAN −18 | WTI +38 | | | | |
| Cronulla-Sutherland Sharks | SGI +14 | **CAN** **−2** | PAR −24 | **NQL** **+38** | SYD −8 | NEW −4 | **CBY** **−6** | MEL −26 | PEN −48 | **SOU** **−10** | SGI +1* | **GCT** **+28** | X | **PEN** **+1** | NQL +2 | BRI −8 | **NZL** **+8** | CAN −16 | CBY +20 | **MAN** **−18** | **NZL** **−2** | **NEW** **−2** | WTI +30 | BRI +8 | **MEL** **−12** | | | | |
| Gold Coast Titans | **NZL** **−13** | **BRI** **+12** | NQL +36 | **CAN** **−16** | **NEW** **+26** | MAN −36 | **SOU** **−10** | BRI −8 | WTI +8 | **PEN** **−36** | **CBY** **+10** | CRO −28 | **MEL** **−6** | **SYD** **−1** | **MAN** **−32** | CAN +38 | X | **PAR** **−18** | **SGI** **+22** | **CBY** **+28** | **NQL** **+22** | **SOU** **−30** | **MEL** **−14** | **NEW** **−1** | **NZL** **+44** | **SYD** **−1** | | | |
| Manly Warringah Sea Eagles | SYD −42 | **SOU** **−14** | SGI −26 | **PEN** **−40** | **NZL** **+1** | **GCT** **+36** | WTI +34 | PEN −12 | **NZL** **+6** | BRI +44 | PAR +22 | NEW −8 | X | **NQL** **+32** | GCT +32 | CBY +66 | **CAN** **−14** | **SGI** **+14** | **WTI** **+20** | CRO +18 | **MEL** **−10** | **PAR** **+46** | CAN +1 | **CBY** **+18** | NQL +28 | MEL −28 | **SYD** **+36** | SOU −20 | |
| Melbourne Storm | **SOU** **+8** | PAR −4 | PEN −2 | **BRI** **+34** | CBY +34 | **SYD** **+16** | **NZL** **+22** | **CRO** **+26** | SOU +50 | **SGI** **+26** | CAN +24 | BRI +28 | GCT +6 | **NZL** **+26** | **WTI** **+50** | SYD +46 | X | **NEW** **+44** | NQL +4 | **PEN** **+27** | MAN +10 | **CAN** **+10** | GCT +14 | **PAR** **−12** | CRO +12 | **MAN** **+28** | X | **PEN** **−4** | |
| Newcastle Knights | **CBY** **+16** | **NZL** **+4** | **WTI** **−4** | **SGI** **−9** | GCT −26 | **CRO** **+4** | PEN −18 | **SYD** **−34** | **CAN** **+8** | WTI −18 | NQL −16 | **MAN** **+8** | **PAR** **−36** | SOU −14 | **NZL** **+4** | **NQL** **+38** | X | MEL −44 | SYD −20 | **CAN** **+10** | BRI +8 | CRO +2 | CBY +6 | GCT +1 | BRI −13 | PAR −8 | | | |
| New Zealand Warriors | GCT +13 | NEW −4 | CAN +3 | SYD −20 | MAN −1 | SGI +6 | MEL −22 | NQL +4 | MAN −6 | PAR −16 | WTI +4 | NQL −1 | X | MEL −26 | NEW −4 | SGI −1* | CRO −8 | PEN −14 | SOU −38 | WTI +2 | CRO +2 | CBY +14 | BRI −2 | CAN −12 | GCT −44 | | | | |
| North Queensland Cowboys | PEN −24 | **SGI** **−7** | **GCT** **−36** | CRO −38 | WTI +4 | **CBY** **+12** | **CAN** **+2** | **NZL** **−4** | **BRI** **+1** | **SYD** **−14** | **NEW** **+16** | **NZL** **+1** | X | MAN −32 | **CRO** **−2** | NEW −38 | SOU −28 | **SYD** **−16** | **MEL** **−4** | BRI −19 | GCT −22 | **WTI** **−8** | **PAR** **−16** | **SGI** **+12** | **MAN** **−28** | | | | |
| Parramatta Eels | BRI +8 | **MEL** **+4** | **CRO** **+24** | WTI +14 | **SGI** **−14** | CAN +25 | **BRI** **+40** | CBY +22 | **SYD** **+13** | **NZL** **+16** | **MAN** **−22** | SOU −18 | NEW +36 | **WTI** **+28** | **CBY** **+26** | PEN −1 | X | GCT +18 | **CAN** **−2** | SYD −28 | **SOU** **−28** | MAN −46 | NQL +16 | MEL +12 | **PEN** **−34** | **NEW** **+8** | PEN −2 | | |
| Penrith Panthers | **NQL** **+24** | CBY +28 | **MEL** **+2** | MAN +40 | **CAN** **+20** | BRI +8 | **NEW** **+18** | **MAN** **+12** | **CRO** **+48** | GCT +36 | SOU +44 | **CBY** **+26** | WTI −20 | CRO −1 | **SYD** **+26** | **PAR** **+1** | X | **NZL** **+14** | BRI +6 | MEL −27 | SYD +6 | SGI +18 | **SOU** **+13** | **WTI** **+14** | PAR +34 | **SOU** **−6** | **PAR** **+2** | MEL +4 | **SOU** **+2** |
| South Sydney Rabbitohs | MEL −8 | MAN +14 | **SYD** **+10** | CBY +38 | **BRI** **+29** | **WTI** **+4*** | GCT +10 | CAN +14 | **MEL** **−50** | CRO +10 | **PEN** **−44** | **PAR** **+18** | X | **NEW** **+14** | BRI +46 | WTI +16 | **NQL** **+28** | CBY +8 | **NZL** **+38** | SGI +36 | PAR +28 | GCT +30 | PEN −13 | SYD +42 | **SGI** **+4** | PEN +6 | X | **MAN** **+20** | PEN −2 |
| St. George Illawarra Dragons | **CRO** **−14** | NQL +7 | **MAN** **+26** | NEW +9 | PAR +14 | **NZL** **−6** | SYD −24 | **WTI** **−8** | **CBY** **+20** | MEL −26 | **CRO** **−1*** | WTI −16 | **BRI** **+28** | CBY −22 | **CAN** **+2** | **NZL** **+1*** | X | MAN −14 | GCT −22 | **SOU** **−36** | CAN −8 | **PEN** **−18** | **SYD** **−18** | NQL −12 | SOU −4 | | | | |
| Sydney Roosters | **MAN** **+42** | WTI +34 | SOU −10 | **NZL** **+20** | **CRO** **+8** | MEL −16 | **SGI** **+24** | NEW +34 | PAR −13 | NQL +14 | **BRI** **−18** | **CAN** **+28** | X | GCT +1 | PEN −26 | **MEL** **−46** | CBY +6 | NQL +16 | **NEW** **+20** | **PAR** **+28** | **PEN** **−6** | BRI +1 | SGI +18 | **SOU** **−42** | CAN +24 | GCT +1 | MAN −36 | | |
| Wests Tigers | CAN −18 | **SYD** **−34** | NEW +4 | **PAR** **−14** | **NQL** **−4** | SOU −4* | **MAN** **−34** | SGI +8 | **GCT** **−8** | **NEW** **+18** | **NZL** **−4** | **SGI** **+16** | **PEN** **+20** | PAR −28 | MEL −50 | **SOU** **−16** | X | BRI +18 | MAN −20 | **NZL** **−2** | CBY +12 | NQL +8 | **CRO** **−30** | PEN −14 | **CBY** **−38** | | | | |
| Team | 1 | 2 | 3 | 4 | 5 | 6 | 7 | 8 | 9 | 10 | 11 | 12 | 13 | 14 | 15 | 16 | 17 | 18 | 19 | 20 | 21 | 22 | 23 | 24 | 25 | F1 | F2 | F3 | GF |

Bold – Home game
X – Bye
* – Golden point game
Opponent for round listed above margin

== Ladder ==
2021 NRL season
| Pos | Team | Pld | W | D | L | B | PF | PA | PD | Pts |
|---|---|---|---|---|---|---|---|---|---|---|
| 1 | Melbourne Storm | 24 | 21 | 0 | 3 | 1 | 815 | 316 | +499 | 44 |
| 2 | Penrith Panthers (P) | 24 | 21 | 0 | 3 | 1 | 676 | 286 | +390 | 44 |
| 3 | South Sydney Rabbitohs | 24 | 20 | 0 | 4 | 1 | 775 | 453 | +322 | 42 |
| 4 | Manly-Warringah Sea Eagles | 24 | 16 | 0 | 8 | 1 | 744 | 492 | +252 | 34 |
| 5 | Sydney Roosters | 24 | 16 | 0 | 8 | 1 | 630 | 489 | +141 | 34 |
| 6 | Parramatta Eels | 24 | 15 | 0 | 9 | 1 | 566 | 457 | +109 | 32 |
| 7 | Newcastle Knights | 24 | 12 | 0 | 12 | 1 | 428 | 571 | −143 | 26 |
| 8 | Gold Coast Titans | 24 | 10 | 0 | 14 | 1 | 580 | 583 | −3 | 22 |
| 9 | Cronulla-Sutherland Sharks | 24 | 10 | 0 | 14 | 1 | 520 | 556 | −36 | 22 |
| 10 | Canberra Raiders | 24 | 10 | 0 | 14 | 1 | 481 | 578 | −97 | 22 |
| 11 | St. George Illawarra Dragons | 24 | 8 | 0 | 16 | 1 | 474 | 616 | −142 | 18 |
| 12 | New Zealand Warriors | 24 | 8 | 0 | 16 | 1 | 453 | 624 | −171 | 18 |
| 13 | Wests Tigers | 24 | 8 | 0 | 16 | 1 | 500 | 714 | −214 | 18 |
| 14 | Brisbane Broncos | 24 | 7 | 0 | 17 | 1 | 446 | 695 | −249 | 16 |
| 15 | North Queensland Cowboys | 24 | 7 | 0 | 17 | 1 | 460 | 748 | −288 | 16 |
| 16 | Canterbury-Bankstown Bulldogs | 24 | 3 | 0 | 21 | 1 | 340 | 710 | −370 | 8 |

=== Ladder progression ===
- Numbers highlighted in green indicate that the team finished the round inside the top 8.
- Numbers highlighted in blue indicates the team finished first on the ladder in that round.
- Numbers highlighted in red indicates the team finished last place on the ladder in that round.
- Underlined numbers indicate that the team had a bye during that round.

| | Team | 1 | 2 | 3 | 4 | 5 | 6 | 7 | 8 | 9 | 10 | 11 | 12 | 13 | 14 | 15 | 16 | 17 | 18 | 19 | 20 | 21 | 22 | 23 | 24 | 25 |
|---|---|---|---|---|---|---|---|---|---|---|---|---|---|---|---|---|---|---|---|---|---|---|---|---|---|---|
| 1 | Melbourne Storm | 2 | 2 | 2 | 4 | 6 | 8 | 10 | 12 | 14 | 16 | 18 | 20 | 22 | 24 | 26 | 28 | 30 | 32 | 34 | 36 | 38 | 40 | 42 | 42 | 44 |
| 2 | Penrith Panthers (P) | 2 | 4 | 6 | 8 | 10 | 12 | 14 | 16 | 18 | 20 | 22 | 24 | 24 | 24 | 26 | 28 | 30 | 32 | 34 | 34 | 36 | 38 | 40 | 42 | 44 |
| 3 | South Sydney Rabbitohs | 0 | 2 | 4 | 6 | 8 | 10 | 12 | 14 | 14 | 16 | 16 | 18 | 20 | 22 | 24 | 26 | 28 | 30 | 32 | 34 | 36 | 38 | 38 | 40 | 42 |
| 4 | Manly Warringah Sea Eagles | 0 | 0 | 0 | 0 | 2 | 4 | 6 | 6 | 8 | 10 | 12 | 12 | 14 | 16 | 18 | 20 | 20 | 22 | 24 | 26 | 26 | 28 | 30 | 32 | 34 |
| 5 | Sydney Roosters | 2 | 4 | 4 | 6 | 8 | 8 | 10 | 12 | 12 | 14 | 14 | 16 | 18 | 20 | 20 | 20 | 22 | 24 | 26 | 28 | 28 | 30 | 32 | 32 | 34 |
| 6 | Parramatta Eels | 2 | 4 | 6 | 8 | 8 | 10 | 12 | 14 | 16 | 18 | 18 | 18 | 20 | 22 | 24 | 24 | 26 | 28 | 28 | 28 | 28 | 28 | 30 | 32 | 32 |
| 7 | Newcastle Knights | 2 | 4 | 4 | 4 | 4 | 6 | 6 | 6 | 8 | 8 | 8 | 10 | 10 | 10 | 12 | 14 | 16 | 16 | 16 | 18 | 20 | 22 | 24 | 26 | 26 |
| 8 | Gold Coast Titans | 0 | 2 | 4 | 4 | 6 | 6 | 6 | 6 | 8 | 8 | 10 | 10 | 10 | 10 | 10 | 12 | 14 | 14 | 16 | 18 | 20 | 20 | 20 | 20 | 22 |
| 9 | Cronulla-Sutherland Sharks | 2 | 2 | 2 | 4 | 4 | 4 | 4 | 4 | 4 | 4 | 6 | 8 | 10 | 12 | 14 | 14 | 16 | 16 | 18 | 18 | 18 | 18 | 20 | 22 | 22 |
| 10 | Canberra Raiders | 2 | 4 | 4 | 6 | 6 | 6 | 6 | 6 | 6 | 8 | 8 | 8 | 10 | 12 | 12 | 12 | 14 | 16 | 18 | 18 | 20 | 20 | 20 | 22 | 22 |
| 11 | St. George Illawarra Dragons | 0 | 2 | 4 | 6 | 8 | 8 | 8 | 8 | 10 | 10 | 10 | 10 | 12 | 12 | 14 | 16 | 18 | 18 | 18 | 18 | 18 | 18 | 18 | 18 | 18 |
| 12 | New Zealand Warriors | 2 | 2 | 4 | 4 | 4 | 6 | 6 | 8 | 8 | 8 | 10 | 10 | 12 | 12 | 12 | 12 | 12 | 12 | 12 | 14 | 16 | 18 | 18 | 18 | 18 |
| 13 | Wests Tigers | 0 | 0 | 2 | 2 | 2 | 2 | 2 | 4 | 4 | 6 | 6 | 8 | 10 | 10 | 10 | 10 | 12 | 14 | 14 | 14 | 16 | 18 | 18 | 18 | 18 |
| 14 | Brisbane Broncos | 0 | 0 | 2 | 2 | 2 | 2 | 2 | 4 | 4 | 4 | 6 | 6 | 6 | 6 | 6 | 8 | 10 | 10 | 10 | 12 | 12 | 12 | 14 | 14 | 16 |
| 15 | North Queensland Cowboys | 0 | 0 | 0 | 0 | 2 | 4 | 6 | 6 | 8 | 8 | 10 | 12 | 14 | 14 | 14 | 14 | 14 | 14 | 14 | 14 | 14 | 14 | 14 | 16 | 16 |
| 16 | Canterbury-Bankstown Bulldogs | 0 | 0 | 0 | 0 | 0 | 0 | 2 | 2 | 2 | 2 | 2 | 2 | 4 | 6 | 6 | 6 | 6 | 6 | 6 | 6 | 6 | 6 | 6 | 6 | 8 |

== Finals series ==
Due to the imposition of lockdown measures in New South Wales due to a COVID-19 outbreak, all finals matches were played at neutral venues in Queensland.

| Home | Score | Away | Match Information |
| Home | Score | Away | Date and Time (Local) | Venue | Referee | Crowd |
|---|---|---|---|---|---|---|
QUALIFYING & ELIMINATION FINALS
| Melbourne Storm | 40 – 12 | Manly Warringah Sea Eagles | 10 September 2021, 7:50 pm | Sunshine Coast Stadium | Grant Atkins | 9,120 |
| Sydney Roosters | 25 – 24 | Gold Coast Titans | 11 September 2021, 5:40 pm | Queensland Country Bank Stadium | Adam Gee | 18,244 |
| Penrith Panthers | 10 – 16 | South Sydney Rabbitohs | 11 September 2021, 7:50 pm | Queensland Country Bank Stadium | Gerard Sutton | 18,244 |
| Parramatta Eels | 28 – 20 | Newcastle Knights | 12 September 2021, 4:05 pm | Browne Park | Ashley Klein | 5,087 |
SEMI FINALS
| Manly Warringah Sea Eagles | 42 – 6 | Sydney Roosters | 17 September 2021, 7:50 pm | BB Print Stadium | Gerard Sutton | 5,824 |
| Penrith Panthers | 8 – 6 | Parramatta Eels | 18 September 2021, 7:50 pm | BB Print Stadium | Ashley Klein | 6,011 |
PRELIMINARY FINALS
| South Sydney Rabbitohs | 36 – 16 | Manly Warringah Sea Eagles | 24 September 2021, 8:05 pm | Suncorp Stadium | Ashley Klein | 26,249 |
| Melbourne Storm | 6 – 10 | Penrith Panthers | 25 September 2021, 4:00 pm | Suncorp Stadium | Gerard Sutton | 29,011 |

=== Bracket ===
Qualifying and elimination finals
10 September – Sunshine Coast
1 | Melbourne | 40
4 | Manly Warringah | 12
11 September – Townsville
5 | Sydney | 25
8 | Gold Coast | 24
12 September – Rockhampton
6 | Parramatta | 28
7 | Newcastle | 20
11 September – Townsville
2 | Penrith | 10
3 | South Sydney | 16

Semi-finals
17 September – Mackay
Manly Warringah | 42
Sydney | 6
18 September – Mackay
Penrith | 8
Parramatta | 6

Preliminary finals
25 September – Brisbane
Melbourne | 6
Penrith | 10
24 September – Brisbane
South Sydney | 36
Manly Warringah | 16

Grand final
3 October – Brisbane
Penrith | 14
South Sydney | 12

== Grand Final ==
2021 NRL Grand Final

Sunday, 3 October
18:35 AEST (UTC+10)

| Penrith Panthers | 14 – 12 | South Sydney Rabbitohs |
|---|---|---|
| Tries: 2 Burton 17'; Crichton 67'; Goals: 3 Cleary 19', pen 33', 69' (3/3) | 1st: 8–6; 2nd: 6–6 | Tries: 2 Walker 21'; Johnston 75'; Goals: 2 Reynolds 23', pen 45' (2/3) |

Suncorp Stadium, Brisbane
Attendance: 39,322
Referee: Gerard Sutton
Touch judges: Dave Munro, Todd Smith
Clive Churchill Medal: Nathan Cleary (Penrith)

== Player statistics and records ==
The following statistics are as of the conclusion of Round 25.

Top 5 point scorers

| Points | Player | Tries | Goals | Field Goals |
|---|---|---|---|---|
| 304 | Reuben Garrick | 21 | 110 | 0 |
| 248 | Adam Reynolds | 5 | 112 | 2 |
| 213 | Nathan Cleary | 10 | 85 | 2 |
| 174 | Adam Doueihi | 9 | 69 | 0 |
| 148 | Jamal Fogarty | 4 | 66 | 0 |

Top 5 try scorers

| Tries | Player |
|---|---|
| 27 | Alex Johnston |
| 25 | Tom Trbojevic |
| 23 | Josh Addo-Carr |
| 23 | Jason Saab |
| 21 | Reuben Garrick |

Top 5 goal scorers

| Goals | Player |
|---|---|
| 112 | Adam Reynolds |
| 110 | Reuben Garrick |
| 85 | Nathan Cleary |
| 69 | Adam Doueihi |
| 66 | Jamal Fogarty |

Top 5 tacklers

| Tackles | Player |
|---|---|
| 1,036 | Jayden Brailey |
| 1,010 | Andrew McCullough |
| 956 | Blayke Brailey |
| 926 | Damien Cook |
| 911 | Reece Robson |

== 2021 Transfers ==
=== Players ===
| Player | 2020 Club | 2021 Club |
|---|---|---|
| Jack Bird | Brisbane Broncos | St. George Illawarra Dragons |
| Darius Boyd | Brisbane Broncos | Retirement |
| David Fifita | Brisbane Broncos | Gold Coast Titans |
| Jordan Kahu | Brisbane Broncos | Retirement |
| Issac Luke | Brisbane Broncos | Wynnum Manly Seagulls (Intrust Super Cup) |
| Joe Ofahengaue | Brisbane Broncos | Wests Tigers |
| John Bateman | Canberra Raiders | Super League: Wigan Warriors |
| Nick Cotric | Canberra Raiders | Canterbury-Bankstown Bulldogs |
| Michael Oldfield | Canberra Raiders | Parramatta Eels |
| Jack Cogger | Canterbury-Bankstown Bulldogs | Super League: Huddersfield Giants |
| Kieran Foran | Canterbury-Bankstown Bulldogs | Manly Warringah Sea Eagles |
| Kerrod Holland | Canterbury-Bankstown Bulldogs | Retirement |
| Tim Lafai | Canterbury-Bankstown Bulldogs | N/A |
| Marcelo Montoya | Canterbury-Bankstown Bulldogs | New Zealand Warriors |
| Reimis Smith | Canterbury-Bankstown Bulldogs | Melbourne Storm |
| Sauaso Sue | Canterbury-Bankstown Bulldogs | Newcastle Knights |
| Aiden Tolman | Canterbury-Bankstown Bulldogs | Cronulla-Sutherland Sharks |
| Bryson Goodwin | Cronulla-Sutherland Sharks | Retirement |
| Nene Macdonald | Cronulla-Sutherland Sharks | Norths Devils (Intrust Super Cup) |
| Scott Sorensen | Cronulla-Sutherland Sharks | Penrith Panthers |
| Jai Arrow | Gold Coast Titans | South Sydney Rabbitohs |
| Shannon Boyd | Gold Coast Titans | Retirement |
| Bryce Cartwright | Gold Coast Titans | Parramatta Eels |
| Dale Copley | Gold Coast Titans | Brisbane Broncos |
| Keegan Hipgrave | Gold Coast Titans | Parramatta Eels |
| Ryan James | Gold Coast Titans | Canberra Raiders |
| Nathan Peats | Gold Coast Titans | Super League: Leigh Centurions |
| Tyrone Roberts | Gold Coast Titans | Norths Devils (Intrust Super Cup) |
| Young Tonumaipea | Gold Coast Titans | Melbourne Rebels (Super Rugby) |
| Brendan Elliot | Manly Warringah Sea Eagles | Super League: Leigh Centurions |
| Addin Fonua-Blake | Manly Warringah Sea Eagles | New Zealand Warriors |
| Danny Levi | Manly Warringah Sea Eagles | Brisbane Broncos |
| Joel Thompson | Manly Warringah Sea Eagles | Super League: St. Helens |
| Corey Waddell | Manly Warringah Sea Eagles | Canterbury-Bankstown Bulldogs |
| Sandor Earl | Melbourne Storm | Retirement |
| Tino Fa'asuamaleaui | Melbourne Storm | Gold Coast Titans |
| Cameron Smith | Melbourne Storm | Retirement |
| Albert Vete | Melbourne Storm | Super League: Hull Kingston Rovers |
| Suliasi Vunivalu | Melbourne Storm | Queensland Reds (Super Rugby) |
| Herman Ese'ese | Newcastle Knights | Gold Coast Titans |
| Tim Glasby | Newcastle Knights | Retirement |
| Aidan Guerra | Newcastle Knights | Retirement |
| Mason Lino | Newcastle Knights | Super League: Wakefield Trinity |
| Sione Mata'utia | Newcastle Knights | Super League: St. Helens |
| Andrew McCullough | Newcastle Knights | St. George Illawarra Dragons |
| Tautau Moga | Newcastle Knights | South Sydney Rabbitohs |
| Gerard Beale | New Zealand Warriors | St. George Illawarra Dragons |
| Adam Blair | New Zealand Warriors | Retirement |
| Lachlan Burr | New Zealand Warriors | North Queensland Cowboys |
| Blake Green | New Zealand Warriors | Newcastle Knights |
| Patrick Herbert | New Zealand Warriors | Gold Coast Titans |
| Karl Lawton | New Zealand Warriors | Manly Warringah Sea Eagles |
| Agnatius Paasi | New Zealand Warriors | Super League: St. Helens |
| Isaiah Papali'i | New Zealand Warriors | Parramatta Eels |
| Leivaha Pulu | New Zealand Warriors | Norths Devils (Intrust Super Cup) |
| Nathaniel Roache | New Zealand Warriors | Parramatta Eels |
| John Asiata | North Queensland Cowboys | Brisbane Broncos |
| Gavin Cooper | North Queensland Cowboys | Retirement |
| Esan Marsters | North Queensland Cowboys | Gold Coast Titans |
| Josh McGuire | North Queensland Cowboys | St. George Illawarra Dragons |
| Tom Opacic | North Queensland Cowboys | Parramatta Eels |
| Daniel Alvaro | Parramatta Eels | St. George Illawarra Dragons |
| Kane Evans | Parramatta Eels | New Zealand Warriors |
| David Gower | Parramatta Eels | Retirement |
| George Jennings | Parramatta Eels | Melbourne Storm |
| Michael Jennings | Parramatta Eels | Suspension |
| Brad Takairangi | Parramatta Eels | Super League: Hull Kingston Rovers |
| Peni Terepo | Parramatta Eels | Retirement |
| Jack Hetherington | Penrith Panthers | Canterbury-Bankstown Bulldogs |
| Josh Mansour | Penrith Panthers | South Sydney Rabbitohs |
| James Tamou | Penrith Panthers | Wests Tigers |
| Zane Tetevano | Penrith Panthers | Super League: Leeds Rhinos |
| Dean Whare | Penrith Panthers | Super League: Catalans Dragons |
| Corey Allan | South Sydney Rabbitohs | Canterbury-Bankstown Bulldogs |
| Ethan Lowe | South Sydney Rabbitohs | Retirement |
| James Roberts | South Sydney Rabbitohs | Wests Tigers |
| Bayley Sironen | South Sydney Rabbitohs | New Zealand Warriors |
| Euan Aitken | St. George Illawarra Dragons | New Zealand Warriors |
| Tyson Frizell | St. George Illawarra Dragons | Newcastle Knights |
| Jacob Host | St. George Illawarra Dragons | South Sydney Rabbitohs |
| Korbin Sims | St. George Illawarra Dragons | Super League: Hull Kingston Rovers |
| Mitchell Aubusson | Sydney Roosters | Retirement |
| Boyd Cordner | Sydney Roosters | Retirement |
| Poasa Faamausili | Sydney Roosters | St. George Illawarra Dragons |
| Kyle Flanagan | Sydney Roosters | Canterbury-Bankstown Bulldogs |
| Ryan Hall | Sydney Roosters | Super League: Hull Kingston Rovers |
| Sonny Bill Williams | Sydney Roosters | Retirement |
| Josh Aloiai | Wests Tigers | Manly Warringah Sea Eagles |
| Matt Eisenhuth | Wests Tigers | Penrith Panthers |
| Robert Jennings | Wests Tigers | Penrith Panthers |
| Chris Lawrence | Wests Tigers | Retirement |
| Benji Marshall | Wests Tigers | South Sydney Rabbitohs |
| Chris McQueen | Wests Tigers | Super League: Huddersfield Giants |
| Josh Reynolds | Wests Tigers | Super League: Hull F.C. |
| Elijah Taylor | Wests Tigers | Super League: Salford Red Devils |
| David Mead | Super League: Catalans Dragons | Brisbane Broncos |
| Albert Kelly | Super League: Hull F.C. | Brisbane Broncos |
| Ava Seumanufagai | Super League: Leeds Rhinos | Canterbury-Bankstown Bulldogs |
| Joey Lussick | Super League: Salford Red Devils | Parramatta Eels |
| Luke Thompson | Super League: St. Helens | Canterbury-Bankstown Bulldogs |
| Ben Murdoch-Masila | Super League: Warrington Wolves | New Zealand Warriors |
| Javid Bowen | Northern Pride (Intrust Super Cup) | North Queensland Cowboys |
| Karmichael Hunt | New South Wales Waratahs (Super Rugby) | Brisbane Broncos |
| Tepai Moeroa | New South Wales Waratahs (Super Rugby) | Melbourne Storm |
| Will Chambers | Suntory Sungoliath (Japanese rugby union) | Cronulla-Sutherland Sharks |
| Jack de Belin | Suspension | St. George Illawarra Dragons |

=== Loan moves ===
| Player | Home club | → Loan club | Dates | Pld | Ref |
|---|---|---|---|---|---|
| Jamayne Taunoa-Brown | New Zealand Warriors | St George Illawarra Dragons | 12 July – 25 July (Rounds 18 – 19) | 2 | |
| Corey Horsburgh | Canberra Raiders | Canterbury-Bankstown Bulldogs | 10 August – 23 August (Rounds 22 – 23) | 1 | |
| Ryan James | Canberra Raiders | Canterbury-Bankstown Bulldogs | 10 August – 23 August (Rounds 22 – 23) | 1 | |
| Freddy Lussick | Sydney Roosters | St George Illawarra Dragons | 24 August – 6 September (Rounds 24 – 25) | 2 | |

=== Coaches ===
| Coach | 2020 Club | 2021 Club |
|---|---|---|
| Kevin Walters | Queensland | Brisbane Broncos |
| Trent Barrett | N/A | Canterbury-Bankstown Bulldogs |
| Nathan Brown | N/A | New Zealand Warriors |
| Anthony Griffin | N/A | St. George Illawarra Dragons |
