= 2026 Canterbury-Bankstown Bulldogs season =

NRL rugby league season

- 2026 record: Wins: 11; losses: 11
- Points scored: For: 446; against: 478

Team information
- CEO: Aaron Warburton
- Head Coach: Cameron Ciraldo
- Captain: Stephen Crichton
- Stadium: Accor Stadium
- Avg. attendance: 24,021
- High attendance: 45,719 (Rd 1)
- Low attendance: 14,372 (Rd 12)

Top scorers
- Tries: Jacob Kiraz (9)
- Goals: Stephen Crichton (49)
- Points: Stephen Crichton (128)
← 2025	List of seasons	2027 →

The 2026 Canterbury-Bankstown Bulldogs season is the club's 92nd season in the professional National Rugby League (NRL) football competition in Australia.

The club unveiled a new logo on October 16, 2025 which was officially adopted from November 1, 2025.

It is Cameron Ciraldo's fourth season as head coach of the club.

== Pre-season challenge ==
The 2026 NRL pre-season will be played in February, before the commencement of the regular season.

Round 1: 7 February 2026	Canterbury-Bankstown Bulldogs	30-34	North Queensland Cowboys	Kogarah
17:30 AEDT	Tries: Matamua 37'; Fitzgibbon 46'; Toy 57'; Grossemy 63'; Rauqe 66'; Nassar 77'; Goals: Sua 1/3 38'; Fitzgibbon 2/3 67', 78'	[ Report]	Tries: Luki 5'; Derby 15'; Laybutt 17'; Derby 21'; O'Donnell 26'; Barber 75'; Goals: Clifford 4/5 7', 19', 23', 28'; Sutton 1/1 75'	Stadium: Jubilee Stadium; Attendance: 3,926; Referee: Liam Kennedy

Round 2: 14 February 2026	Newcastle Knights	0-28	Canterbury-Bankstown Bulldogs	Newcastle
18:00 AEDT		[ Report]	Tries: Sua 15'; Burton 19'; Salmon 33'; Kikau 64'; Toy 74'; Goals: Crichton 2/3 21', 35'; O'Sullivan 2/2 65', 75'	Stadium: McDonald Jones Stadium; Attendance: 8,358; Referee: Nick Pelgrave

== Regular season ==
=== Results by round ===
Round	1	2	3	4	5	6	7	8	9	10	11	12	13	14	15	16	17	18	19	20	21	22	23	24	25	26	27
Ground	H	–	A	H	A	H	A	A	H	A	A	H	A	H	–	H	A	–	H	H	H	A	A	H	A	A	H
Result	W	B	W	L	L	W	L	L	L	L	L	W	L	W	B	W	W	B	L	W	W	W	L	L	W		
Position	7	6	3	6	9	7	10	10	12	13	14	13	14	13	12	12	10	10	11	10	9	8	9	9	9		
Points	2	4	6	6	6	8	8	8	8	8	8	10	10	12	14	16	18	20	20	22	24	26	26	26	28		

Source: National Rugby League
A = Away; H = Home; B = Bye; W = Win; D = Draw; L = Loss

=== Matches ===
The league fixtures were announced on 14 November 2025.

Bye Win Draw Loss Fixtures

Round 1: 1 March 2026	Canterbury-Bankstown Bulldogs	15-14	St. George Illawarra Dragons	Las Vegas, USA
15:30 AEDT	Tries: Preston 10'; Kiraz 49'; Goals: Crichton 3/4 12', 26 pen', 36 pen' Field goals: Crichton 89'	Report	Tries: Guler 14'; Tu 58'; Goals: Holmes 3/4 7 pen', 15', 73 pen'	Stadium: Allegiant Stadium; Attendance: 45,719; Referee: Grant Atkins

Round 2 (Bye)

Round 3: 19 March 2026	Canberra Raiders	10-14	Canterbury-Bankstown Bulldogs	Canberra
20:00 AEDT	Tries: Tamale 3', 73'; Goals: Sanders 1/2 4'; Sin bin: Papalii (yellow card) 16' to 26'	Report	Tries: Tracey 10'; Preston 10'; Goals: Crichton 3/4 15 pen', 19 pen', 71'	Stadium: GIO Stadium; Attendance: 13,723; Referee: Adam Gee

Round 4: 28 March 2026	Canterbury-Bankstown Bulldogs	16-24	Newcastle Knights	Sydney Olympic Park
15:00 AEDT	Tries: Burton 48', 54'; Kiraz 72'; Goals: Crichton 2/3 50', 55'	Report	Tries: Young 6', 60', 69'; Frizell 33'; Lucas 39'; Goals: Smith 2/5 34', 40'; Sin bin: Lucas (yellow card) 8' to 18'	Stadium: Accor Stadium; Attendance: 20,572; Referee: Peter Gough

Round 5: 3 April 2026	South Sydney Rabbitohs	32-24	Canterbury-Bankstown Bulldogs	Sydney Olympic Park
16:05 AEDT	Tries: Johnston 4'; Mitchell 22', 65'; Duncan 46'; Murray 56'; Goals: Mitchell 6/7 6', 27 pen', 47', 57', 67', 70 pen'	Report	Tries: Montoya 19'; Galvin 30'; Tupouniua 36'; Tracey 78'; Goals: Crichton 3/4 21', 32', 34 pen' Burton 1/1 79'	Stadium: Accor Stadium; Attendance: 49,813; Referee: Todd Smith

Round 6: 9 April 2026	Canterbury-Bankstown Bulldogs	32-16	Penrith Panthers	Sydney Olympic Park
19:50 AEST	Tries: Kikau 5'; Kiraz 9'; Hughes 20'; Preston 47'; Tupouniua 69'; Goals: Burton 6/7 11', 22', 48', 70', 73 pen', 79 pen'	Report	Tries: Jenkins 25', 42'; Edwards 29'; Goals: Cleary 2/3 27', 31'; Sin bin: McLean (yellow card) 8' to 18'	Stadium: Accor Stadium; Attendance: 23,984; Referee: Gerard Sutton

Round 7: 19 April 2026	Parramatta Eels	38-20	Canterbury-Bankstown Bulldogs	Parramatta
16:05 AEDT	Tries: Addo-Carr 13'; Volkman 28'; Papalii 34'; Walker 57'; Da Silva 70'; Penisini 75'; Goals: Volkman 1/1 15'; Moses 6/6 29', 35', 58', 69 pen', 72', 76'	Report	Tries: Kiraz 10'; Galvin 50'; Sua 72'; Xerri 77'; Goals: Burton 2/4 52', 73'	Stadium: CommBank Stadium; Attendance: 25,938; Referee: Liam Kennedy

Round 8: 24 April 2026	Brisbane Broncos	32-12	Canterbury-Bankstown Bulldogs	Brisbane
20:00 AEST	Tries: Shibasaki 16'; Karapani 21'; Mariner 32'; Paix 37'; Mam 45'; Willison 78'; Goals: Reynolds 4/7 17', 28 pen', 47', 79'; Sin bin: Riki (yellow card) 50' to 60'	Report	Tries: Burton 55'; Galvin 68'; Goals: Crichton 2/2 56', 69'; Sin bin: Hayes (yellow card) 28' to 38'	Stadium: Suncorp Stadium; Attendance: 42,775; Referee: Wyatt Raymond

Round 9: 1 May 2026	Canterbury-Bankstown Bulldogs	12-28	North Queensland Cowboys	Sydney Olympic Park
18:00 AEST	Tries: Galvin 7'; Curran 52'; Goals: Crichton 2/2 9', 53'	Report	Tries: Cotter 18'; Drinkwater 28', 65'; Clifford 74'; Burns 78'; Goals: Clifford 4/5 20', 30', 66', 76'	Stadium: Accor Stadium; Attendance: 15,132; Referee: Peter Gough

Round 10: 7 May 2026	Dolphins	44-12	Canterbury-Bankstown Bulldogs	Brisbane
19:50 AEST	Tries: Isaako 20', 37', 44'; Cobbo 31', 77'; Marshall-King 56'; Bostock 60'; Nikorima 65'; Goals: Isaako 6/8 39', 46', 57', 61', 67', 78'; Sin bin: Finefeuiaki (yellow card) 79' to 80'	Report	Tries: Salmon 8'; Crichton 25'; Goals: Crichton 2/3 9', 16 pen' Sin bin: Preston (yellow card) 36' to 46'	Stadium: Suncorp Stadium; Attendance: 16,143; Referee: Grant Atkins

Round 11: 15 May 2026	Cronulla-Sutherland Sharks	38-16	Canterbury-Bankstown Bulldogs	Brisbane
18:00 AEST	Tries: Trindall 3'; Mulitalo 9', 71'; Kennedy 16'; Puru 23'; Hynes 32'; Goals: Hynes 7/8 5', 11 pen', 17', 24', 34', 45 pen', 72'	Report	Tries: Preston 29'; Crichton 59'; Xerri 77'; Goals: Crichton 1/2 30'; Burton 1/1 60'	Stadium: Suncorp Stadium; Attendance: 45,236; Referee: Gerard Sutton

Round 12: 22 May 2026	Canterbury-Bankstown Bulldogs	30-20	Melbourne Storm	Sydney Olympic Park
20:00 AEST	Tries: Tuala 18'; Tupouniua 42'; Rinakama 55', 72'; Kiraz 77'; Goals: Burton 5/6 20', 43', 56', 61 pen', 77'	Report	Tries: Leo 3', 12'; King 23'; Goals: Meaney 4/4 4', 14', 25', 50 pen'	Stadium: Accor Stadium; Attendance: 14,372; Referee: Wyatt Raymond

Round 13: 30 May 2026	Wests Tigers	22-16	Canterbury-Bankstown Bulldogs	Parramatta
17:30 AEST	Tries: Skelton 9', 55'; Tavana 16'; Bula 28'; Goals: Madden 3/5 10', 29', 59'	Report	Tries: Kiraz 36'; Tuala 47'; Galvin 68'; Goals: Crichton 2/3 37', 70'	Stadium: CommBank Stadium; Attendance: 17,505; Referee: Peter Gouch

Round 14: 8 June 2026	Canterbury-Bankstown Bulldogs	14-12	Parramatta Eels	Sydney Olympic Park
16:00 AEST	Tries: Tupouniua 47'; Crichton 50'; Goals: Crichton 3/3 48', 51', 76 pen'	Report	Tries: Da Silva 59'; Papalii 50'; Goals: Da Silva 2/2 60', 63'	Stadium: Accor Stadium; Attendance: 37,638; Referee: Todd Smith

Round 15 (Bye)

Round 16: 20 June 2026	Canterbury-Bankstown Bulldogs	13-12	Manly Warringah Sea Eagles	Sydney Olympic Park
19:30 AEST	Tries: Crichton 33'; Galvin 60'; Goals: Crichton 2/2 34', 61'; Field goals: Crichton 82'	Report	Tries: Hopoate 6', 67'; Garrick 19'; Goals: Fogarty 0/3	Stadium: Accor Stadium; Attendance: 18,243; Referee: Adam Gee

Round 17: 26 June 2026	Gold Coast Titans	12-30	Canterbury-Bankstown Bulldogs	Gold Coast
18:00 AEST	Tries: Sami 52', 69', 72'; Goals: Campbell 0/3	Report	Tries: Rinakama 14', 61'; Curran 25', 77'; King 66'; Goals: Crichton 5/5 15', 27', 62', 68', 78'	Stadium: Cbus Super Stadium; Attendance: 13,820; Referee: Todd Smith

Round 18 (Bye)

Round 19: 11 July 2026	Canterbury-Bankstown Bulldogs	16-40	Canberra Raiders	Sydney Olympic Park
17:30 AEST	Tries: Rinakama 43'; Burton 70'; Tracey 79'; Goals: Burton 2/3 71', 79'	Report	Tries: Savage 8'; Martin 16'; Hosking 21', 51', 53'; Sasagi 64'; Goals: Sanders 8/9 9', 18', 22', 30 pen', 38 pen', 52', 55', 61 pen'	Stadium: Accor Stadium; Attendance: 19,801; Referee: Gerard Sutton

Round 20: 18 July 2026	Canterbury-Bankstown Bulldogs	32-0	Wests Tigers	Sydney Olympic Park
19:30 AEST	Tries: Rinakama 1'; Curran 6', 72'; Tuala 65'; Burton; Goals: Burton 6/6 3', 8', 24', 63 pen', 67', 74'	Report	Sin bin: Fainu (yellow card) 63' to 73'; Twal (yellow card) 69' to 79'	Stadium: Accor Stadium; Attendance: 20,050; Referee: Phil Henderson

Round 21: 25 July 2026	Canterbury-Bankstown Bulldogs	18-6	New Zealand Warriors	Sydney Olympic Park
17:30 AEST	Tries: Crichton 5'; Preston 11'; Kiraz 46'; Goals: Crichton 3/4 6', 13', 71 pen'	Report	Tries: Harris-Tavita 74'; Goals: Harris-Tavita 1/1 75'	Stadium: Accor Stadium; Attendance: 22,135; Referee: Adam Gee

Round 22: 31 July 2026	Melbourne Storm	22-36	Canterbury-Bankstown Bulldogs	Melbourne
20:00 AEST	Tries: Leo 5', 39'; Faalogo 20'; Hinchey 47'; Goals: Meaney 3/4 7', 22', 48'	Report	Tries: Salmon 15', 30'; Rinakama 24'; Burton 50'; Curran 61'; Crichton 69', 77'; Goals: Crichton 4/7 17', 31', 62', 79'; Sin bin: Hayward (yellow card) 38' to 48'	Stadium: AAMI Park; Attendance: 19,243; Referee: Gerard Sutton

Round 23: 7 August 2026	Sydney Roosters	20-18	Canterbury-Bankstown Bulldogs	Moore Park
20:00 AEST	Tries: Smith 13', 66'; Wong 22'; Foketi 69'; Goals: Walker 2/5 68', 70'	Report	Tries: Kiraz 44', 55'; Galvin 51'; Goals: Crichton 3/4 6 pen', 46', 52'	Stadium: Allianz Stadium; Attendance: 30,306; Referee: Grant Atkins

Round 24: 14 August 2026	Canterbury-Bankstown Bulldogs	6-22	South Sydney Rabbitohs	Sydney Olympic Park
20:00 AEST	Tries: Tuala 61'; Goals: Crichton 1/1 63'	Report	Tries: Fifita 22'; Johnston 28'; Duncan 40'; Graham 46'; Dufty 77'; Goals: Sullivan 1/5 23'	Stadium: Accor Stadium; Attendance: 26,582; Referee: Ashley Klein

Round 25: 22 August 2026	St. George Illawarra Dragons	14-44	Canterbury-Bankstown Bulldogs	Moore Park
19:30 AEST	Tries: Holmes 47'; Feagai 63', 68'; Goals: Holmes 1/3 49'; Sin bin: Suli (yellow card) 79' to 80'	Report	Tries: Xerri 11'; Burton 25', 36'; Preston 28'; King 52'; Galvin 56'; Tracey 74'; Goals: Crichton 8/8 13', 27', 29', 38', 53', 57', 76', 79 pen' Sin bin: Sua (yellow card) 7' to 17'; Burton (yellow card) 62' to 72'	Stadium: Allianz Stadium; Attendance: 14,711; Referee: Liam Kennedy

Round 26: 28 August 2026	Penrith Panthers	24-10	Canterbury-Bankstown Bulldogs	Parramatta
20:00 AEST	Tries: Martin 7', 43'; McLean 66'; Goals: Cleary 6/6 8', 39 pen', 44', 54 pen', 64 pen', 67'	Report	Tries: Burton 24'; Preston 59'; Goals: Crichton 1/1 61'	Stadium: CommBank Stadium; Attendance: 19,979; Referee: Gerard Sutton

Round 27: 3 September 2026	Canterbury-Bankstown Bulldogs	v	Brisbane Broncos	Sydney Olympic Park
19:50 AEST				Stadium: Accor Stadium

=== Ladder ===
Pos	Team	Pld	W	D	L	B	PF	PA	PD	Pts	Qualification
1	Penrith Panthers (Q)	23	17	0	6	3	645	337	+308	40	Advance to finals series
2	New Zealand Warriors (Q)	22	16	0	6	3	651	356	+295	38	Advance to finals series
3	Dolphins (Q)	23	16	0	7	3	638	486	+152	38	Advance to finals series
4	Sydney Roosters (Q)	23	16	0	7	3	599	451	+148	38	Advance to finals series
5	Cronulla-Sutherland Sharks (Q)	22	14	0	8	3	634	461	+173	34	Advance to finals series
6	South Sydney Rabbitohs (Q)	23	13	0	10	3	644	561	+83	32	Advance to finals series
7	Newcastle Knights (Q)	23	14	0	9	2	601	545	+56	32	Advance to finals series
8	North Queensland Cowboys (Q)	23	13	0	10	3	538	602	−64	32	Advance to finals series
9	Manly Warringah Sea Eagles (X)	23	11	0	12	3	593	493	+100	28	
10	Canterbury-Bankstown Bulldogs (X)	23	11	0	12	3	456	502	−46	28	
11	Melbourne Storm (X)	23	10	0	13	3	570	556	+14	26	
12	Canberra Raiders (X)	23	10	0	13	3	531	596	−65	26	
13	Parramatta Eels (X)	22	8	0	14	3	437	636	−199	22	
14	Wests Tigers (X)	23	8	0	15	3	435	661	−226	22	
15	Brisbane Broncos (X)	23	7	0	16	3	437	657	−220	20	
16	Gold Coast Titans (X)	23	6	0	17	3	457	639	−182	18	
17	St. George Illawarra Dragons (X)	23	4	0	19	3	368	695	−327	14	

Updated to match(es) played on 28 August 2026. Source: National Rugby League
(Q) Qualified for finals series; (X) Cannot qualify for finals

== 2026 squad ==
Canterbury Bulldogs 2026 squad
Top 30 squad - 2026 NRL season			Supplementary list	Coaching staff
Matt Burton – FE, CE; Stephen Crichton (c) – CE; Joshua Curran – PR, SR; Kade Dykes – FB, FE; Lachlan Galvin – HB, FE; Harry Hayes – SR, PR; Bailey Hayward – HK, LK, FE; Lipoi Hopoi – PR, SR; Sam Hughes – PR; Viliame Kikau (vc) – SR	Max King – PR; Jacob Kiraz – WG, FB, CE; Finau Latu – LK; Zyon Maiu'u – PR; Kurt Mann – LK; Marcelo Montoya – WG; Sean O'Sullivan – HB, FE; Jacob Preston – SR; Jaeman Salmon – LK, SR; Jonathan Sua – WG	Daniel Suluka-Fifita – PR; Leo Thompson – PR; Jack Todd – LK, PR; Connor Tracey – FB; Enari Tuala – WG, CE; Sitili Tupouniua – PR, SR; Mitchell Woods – HB; Bronson Xerri – CE; Patrick Young – HK	Sosaia Alatini – SR; Fletcher Baker – PR, SR; Gordon Chan Kum Tong – HK; Jethro Rinakama – WG; Logan Spinks – SR; Jack Underhill – PR; Extended squad: Nick O'Meley – FB	Manager: Phil Gould (General Manager of Football); Head coach: Cameron Ciraldo; Assistant coaches: Adam O'Brien; Chad Randall; Luke Vella; Jason Taylor (NSW Cup Coach); Mick Potter (Academy Coach); Josh Jackson (Jersey Flegg Coach); Trent Elkin (Athletic Performance & Rehabilitation Lead); Michael Kulen (Head Football Analyst); Travis Touma (High Performance Manager); Managers: Adam Hartigan (Chief of Staff); Legend: (c) Captain(s); (vc) Vice-captain(s); Updated: 29 August 2026; Source(s): Bulldogs 2025

== See also ==
- 2026 Canterbury-Bankstown Bulldogs Women season
