= 2023 Melbourne Storm season =

NRL rugby league season

- NRL Rank: 3rd
- Play-off result: Lost Preliminary final
- 2023 record: Wins: 16; draws: 0; losses: 8
- Points scored: For: 627; against: 459

Team information
- CEO: Justin Rodski
- Coach: Craig Bellamy
- Captain: Christian Welch (25 games) Jahrome Hughes (1 game) Josh King (1 game)
- Stadium: AAMI Park – 30,050 (9 games); Marvel Stadium – 53,343 (2 games); Suncorp Stadium – 52,500 (1 game)
- Avg. attendance: 18,264 (Note: Home matches in Melbourne only)
- High attendance: 26,829 (Round 18) (Note: Home matches in Melbourne only)

Top scorers
- Tries: Will Warbrick (17)
- Goals: Nick Meaney (91)
- Points: Nick Meaney (222)
← 2022	List of seasons	2024 →

The 2023 Melbourne Storm season was the 26th in the club's history, competing in the 2023 NRL season. The team was coached by Craig Bellamy, coaching the club for his 21st consecutive season. Melbourne Storm were captained by Christian Welch who was captain for the second consecutive season.

Melbourne qualified for their 13th consecutive finals series, but were eliminated via a preliminary final loss against the Penrith Panthers.

== Season summary ==
- Preseason – New recruits from the 2022–23 season took part in Melbourne Storm IDQ camp for pre season before New Years. Tyran Wishart was awarded the IDQ Iron bar.
- 2 January – Fullback Ryan Papenhuyzen left Australia for a two-week training camp in Philadelphia with Bill Knowles, as part of his recovery from injury. Papenhuyzen was six months into his recovery from a broken patella, but was yet to commence running. Knowles a sports reconditioning and athletic development specialist, had previously worked with NRL players Latrell Mitchell and Tom Trbojevic.
- 22 January – Club chairperson Matt Trip suggested in an interview that the 2023 season would be coach Craig Bellamy's last season in the position before retirement. Tripp was quoted as saying "we chatted pre-Christmas and he was more 'no' than 'yes', but that might change as we get towards round one."
- 5 February – After earning selection for the Māori All Stars as the only Melbourne Storm representative, Nelson Asofa-Solomona withdraws from the annual match played in Rotutua, citing a heavy training load after only resuming training in January.
- 9 February – Tui Kamikamica extends his contract with the club for a further two years to remain in Melbourne until the end of the 2025 season.
- 12 February – In the club's first hit out for the season in the NRL's pre-season challenge, an inexperienced Melbourne squad go down 24–32 to the Sydney Roosters in front of almost 8,000 fans at GMHBA Stadium in Geelong. A broken arm to centre Justin Olam saw him leave the field after only a few minutes, but the performances of Victorian fullback Sualauvi Fa'alogo and Tyran Wishart were promising. Melbourne would gain two bonus points in the pre-season challenge format which rewards attacking play.
- 19 February – After an error-ridden first half, Melbourne score 24 unanswered points to take a 24–6 win over New Zealand Warriors in the club's final pre-season trial match. Tries to New Zealanders Will Warbrick, Eliesa Katoa and Nelson Asofa-Solomona setting up the win.
- 22 February – CEO Justin Rodski announced the 2023 club leadership group, with Christian Welch named as sole club captain. Harry Grant, Jahrome Hughes and Cameron Munster were named as vice-captains.
- Round 1 – Harry Grant scores Melbourne's first ever "golden try" in the third minute of golden point extra time to clinch a 16–12 win over Parramatta Eels to open the 2023 NRL season. The win was Melbourne's 21st consecutive round one victory, also ending a four match losing streak against Parramatta. Will Warbrick and Bronson Garlick both made their NRL debuts, with Eliesa Katoa making his Storm debut. Cameron Munster returned to the field after half time, despite suffering a compound dislocation of his third finger on his right hand earlier in the match to inspire a second half comeback.
- 9 March – Forwards Josh King and Lazarus Vaalepu sign new contracts to stay with Melbourne until the end of the 2025 NRL season. King had been made a member of the club's emerging leaders group in 2023 after joining the club for the 2022 season, while Vaalepu has joined the club on a train and trial contract for this season. Vaalepu will hold a development contract in 2024, joining the top 30 squad in 2025.
- Round 3 – In a high-scoring match, Gold Coast Titans win their first game over Melbourne at their home ground since 2013. Jonah Pezet made his NRL debut, scoring a try, with Tariq Sims also marking his Storm debut with a try.
- Round 5 – For the first time this season, Melbourne win consecutive games with the second victory coming in with a solid defensive effort against South Sydney to win 18–10. Harry Grant earns all six Dally M Award points in the match, giving him a share the equal lead for the award after five rounds.
- Round 6 – Melbourne win their third game in a row, defeating the Roosters 28–8 in the rain at AAMI Park. Xavier Coates scored a hat-trick of tries, to send former Melbourne player Brandon Smith back to Sydney a loser in his first match against the Storm.
- Round 7 – In a fiery clash at 4 Pines Park, Manly snap Melbourne's winning streak in a 18–8 defeat. Three players are sent to the sin bin during the match by referee Adam Gee, with Tui Kamikamica and Justin Olam both facing additional penalties from the NRL Judiciary.

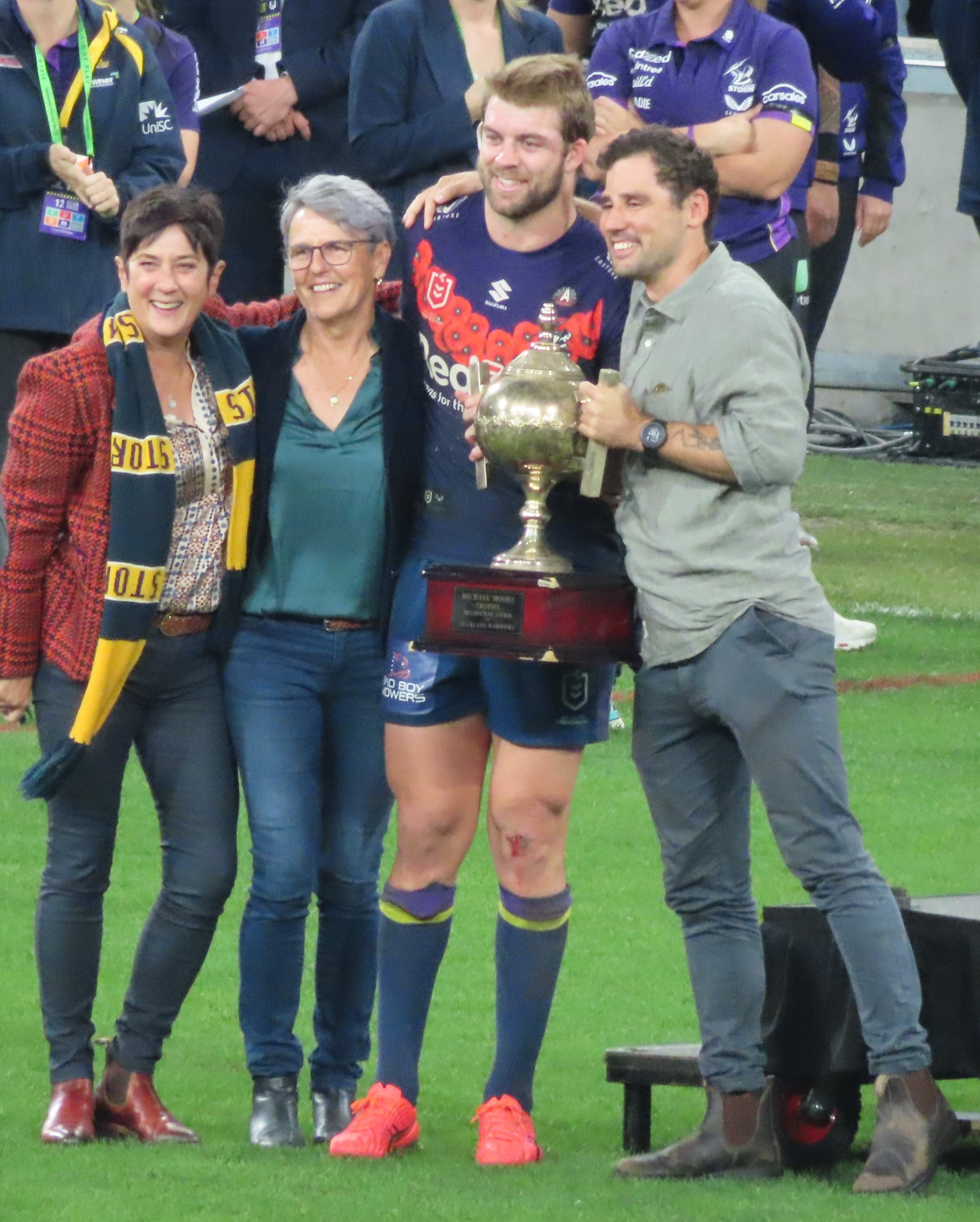
Members of the Moore family presenting Storm captain Christian Welch with the Michael Moore Trophy

- Round 8 – Melbourne retain the Michael Moore Trophy in a quality contest against the New Zealand Warriors, coming from behind to win 30–22. Nick Meaney scored two tries in an 18 point haul to be awarded the Spirit of ANZAC Medal. Following the game, it was announced that out of contract forward Nelson Asofa-Solomona had signed a new contract, keeping him at the club until the end of the 2027 season. Asofa-Solomona had been heavily chased by the Dolphins and a potential switch to rugby union.
- 2 May – Justin Rodski confirms that the club will host two matches at Melbourne's Marvel Stadium, returning to the venue for the first time since 2010. The club had to relocate two home matches due to the 2023 FIFA Women's World Cup being played at AAMI Park.
- Round 10 – Melbourne lose 28–12 against South Sydney at the NRL's annual Magic Round event.
- Round 11 – Melbourne win their 13th consecutive game against the Brisbane Broncos, a streak stretching back to 2016. In a spiteful clash Melbourne emerge with a 24–16 victory, with three Broncos players sent to the sin bin by referee Todd Smith, and Aaron Pene sent to the sin bin late in the game for the Storm.
- 15 May – Head coach Craig Bellamy confirms that he will continue in his role into the 2024 season, for what will be his 22nd in charge of the club. It was thought that he would retire and move into a coaching director role, but revealed that he had a change of mind and would continue with the coach saying "Munster came to me a couple of weeks ago and I don't usually take his advice on life but he said all of the players, and especially the leaders, were very keen for me to stay and they still thought I had something to give to the group".
- 26 May – Bronson Garlick extends his contract with the club, signing a new deal to the end of the 2025 NRL season.
- 30 May – A contract extension was granted to winger Will Warbick following his impressive start to the season. Warbrick's deal will keep him at Melbourne until the end of the 2026 NRL season.
- Round 15 – North Queensland thrash Melbourne 45–20 in Townsville. It was the first time since 2014 that the Storm had conceded 40+ points. The 45 points was the most conceded by Melbourne against the Cowboys.
- Round 16 – Will Warbrick scores a career-best four tries in the Storm's 28–6 win against the Wests Tigers. In the absence of the players selected for Queensland in Origin II, Jahrome Hughes captains the club with Christian Welch suspended.
- Round 18 – Penrith Panthers spoil Melbourne's return to Marvel Stadium, dominating the second half for a 34–16 win.
- Round 20 – Xavier Coates scores another hat-trick of tries against the Roosters in a 30–16 win at the Sydney Cricket Ground.
- 17 July – After an impressive first season at the club, Eliesa Katoa signs an extended contract with the club, keeping him at Melbourne until the end of the 2027 season.

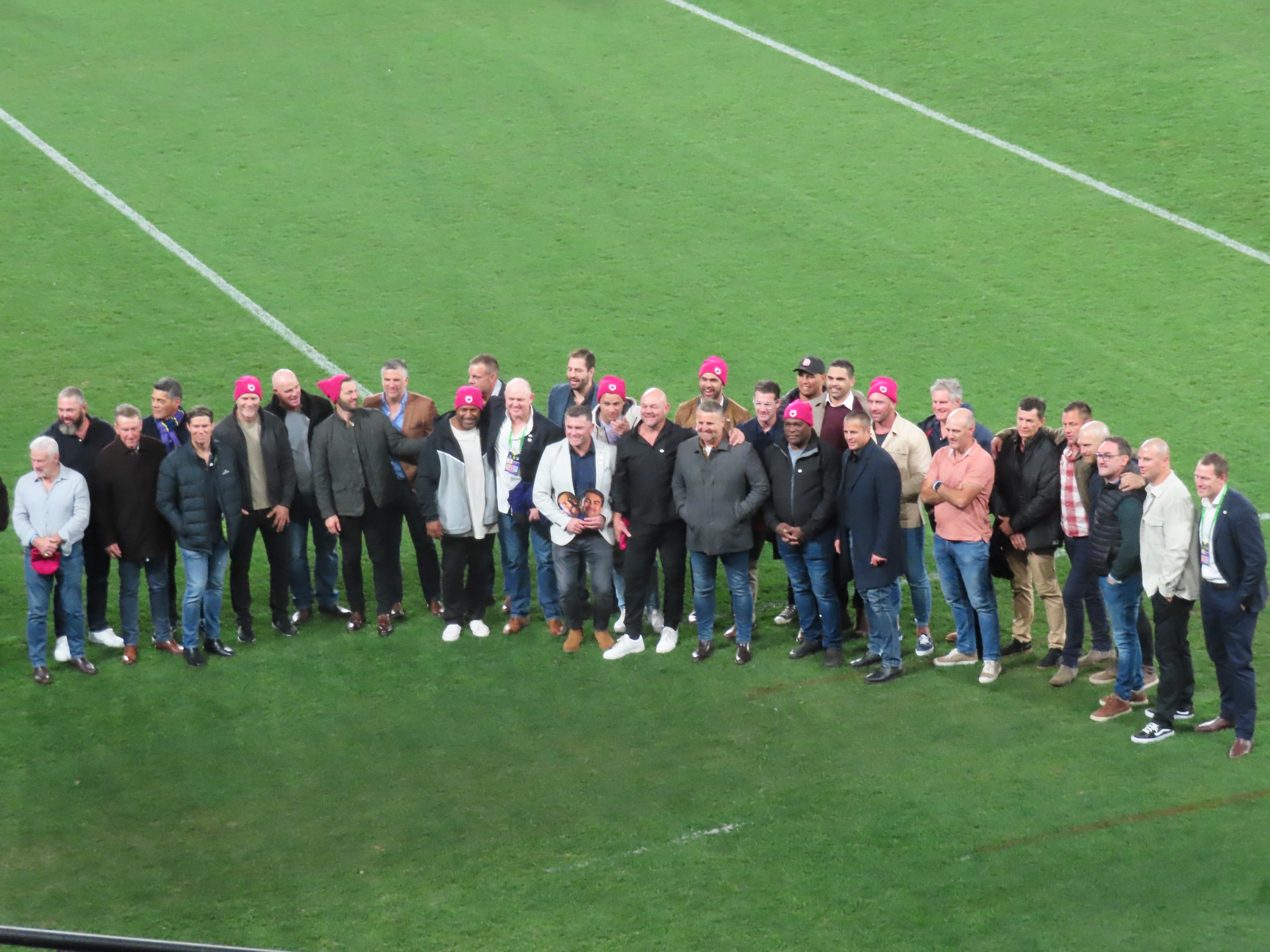
Melbourne Storm "old boys" ahead of the round 22 match against Parramatta at Marvel Stadium

- 29 July – Justin Rodski is forced to defend the club after the Sydney media took offence at the club celebrating the 2007 and 2009 grand final winning teams, displaying the replica Provan-Summons Trophies owned by the Storm. The club displayed the six trophies won by the club before the round 22 match against Parramatta and again at Melbourne's 25th anniversary celebrations, a function attended by over 70 former players. Club legends Billy Slater and Cameron Smith also defending the celebrations, with the largest outrage seeming to come from journalists employed by former club owners News Corporation Australia.
- Round 24 – Young Tonumaipea scores a try in his 50th appearance for the club, becoming the second Victorian player to celebrate the milestone for the club. Melbourne end a run of defeats by the Canberra Raiders at AAMI Park, running in nine tries in a 48–2 victory in the only meeting between the clubs for the season.
- Round 27 – With 21 regular players missing from both teams, including 13 changes from the Storm team that had beaten the Titans in round 26, Melbourne defeated the Brisbane Broncos 32–22 to beat Brisbane for the 14th consecutive match. Melbourne also extending their winning run against the Broncos at their home ground, where Melbourne haven't lost to Brisbane since 2009. Sualauvi Fa'alogo marked an impressive NRL debut, coming from the interchange bench to score two tries. Jack Howarth made his long-awaited NRL debut for the club, and Joe Chan also made his debut as the first father-son combination in club history. Chan's father Alex made 32 appearances for Melbourne in 2004–05. The result (combined with other results in the final round), saw Melbourne finish third on the NRL ladder, qualifying for the club's 13th consecutive finals series appearance.
- Qualifying final – With a number of regulars returning for both teams, Brisbane win their first match against Melbourne since 2016, and their first against the Storm at their home venue since 2009. Brisbane held Melbourne scoreless in a 26–0 win. It was the third time that the Storm have been held scoreless in an NRL finals match, and the first time the club had been held scoreless since 2020. In just his third NRL game back from a lengthy injury break, Ryan Papenhuyzen suffers a serious broken leg, with Xavier Coates also limping off with a leg injury.
- Semi final – Melbourne bounce back to eliminate the Sydney Roosters from the 2023 NRL finals series, with Will Warbrick scoring a spectacular try in the final minutes of the match to give Melbourne the lead. The Storm had led 10–6 at half time, but trailed 13–12 until Warbrick's try.
- 19 September – Cameron Munster and Harry Grant are both named to the Rugby League Players Association Dream Team. It was Grant's first selection in the best 13 players as voted by the players. It was Munster's fourth selection, to equal James Tedesco as having the most appearances in the Players' Dream Team.
- Preliminary final – Penrith eliminate Melbourne from the 2023 NRL finals series, comfortably beating the Storm 38–4 at Accor Stadium.
- 27 September – Harry Grant is named as the 2023 Dally M hooker of the year. Grant finished sixth in the overall Dally M Medal count on 47 points, nine points behind winner Kalyn Ponga. In addition, Cameron Munster was nominated for five eight of the year and Will Warbrick was nominated for rookie of the year.

=== Milestone games ===
Round	Player	Milestone
Round 1	Bronson Garlick	NRL debut
Round 1	William Warbrick	NRL debut
Round 1	Eliesa Katoa	Storm debut
Round 1	Xavier Coates	50th game
Round 2	Kane Bradley	Storm debut
Round 3	Jonah Pezet	NRL debut
Round 3	Tariq Sims	Storm debut
Round 4	Eliesa Katoa	50th game
Round 15	Nick Meaney	100th game
Round 20	Justin Olam	100th game
Round 20	Reimis Smith	100th game
Round 20	Tom Eisenhuth	50th game
Round 27	Sualauvi Fa'alogo	NRL debut
Round 27	Jack Howarth	NRL debut
Round 27	Joe Chan	Storm debut

== Fixtures ==
=== Pre-season ===
Date	Rd	Opponent	Venue	Result	Mel.	Opp.	Tries	Goals	Field goals	Ref
12 February	Trial	Sydney Roosters	GMHBA Stadium, Geelong	Lost	24	32	T Wishart, W Warbrick, S Fa'alogo, G Anderson	J Pezet 3/3, T Wishart 1/1		
19 February	Trial	New Zealand Warriors	Orangetheory Stadium, Christchurch	Won	24	6	E Katoa, W Warbrick, N Asofa-Solomona, X Coates	N Meaney 2/2, J Pezet 2/2		

=== Regular season ===
- (g.p.) – Golden Point extra time
- (pen) – Penalty try

Date	Rd	Opponent	H/A	Venue	Result	Mel.	Opp.	Tries	Goals	Field goals	Ref
2 March	1	Parramatta Eels	Away	CommBank Stadium, Sydney	Won (g.p.)	16	12	N Meaney, Y Tonumaipea, H Grant	N Meaney 2/2	C Munster 0/1, N Meaney 0/1	
11 March	2	Canterbury-Bankstown Bulldogs	Home	AAMI Park, Melbourne	Lost	12	26	N Asofa-Solomona, J Hughes	N Meaney 2/2		
18 March	3 (Note: Multicultural Round)	Gold Coast Titans	Away	Cbus Super Stadium, Gold Coast	Lost	34	38	N Meaney (2), J Pezet, T Sims, J Hughes, X Coates	N Meaney 5/6		
24 March	4	Wests Tigers	Home	AAMI Park, Melbourne	Won	24	12	W Warbrick, N Meaney, J Olam, C Munster	N Meaney 4/6		
31 March	5	South Sydney Rabbitohs	Away	Accor Stadium, Sydney	Won	18	10	J King, W Warbrick, C Munster	N Meaney 3/3		
6 April	6	Sydney Roosters	Home	AAMI Park, Melbourne	Won	28	8	X Coates (3), N Meaney, C Munster	N Meaney 3/5, C Munster 1/1		
14 April	7	Manly Sea Eagles	Away	4 Pines Park, Sydney	Lost	8	18	W Warbrick	J Pezet 2/2, C Munster 0/1		
25 April	8 (Note: ANZAC Round)	New Zealand Warriors	Home	AAMI Park, Melbourne	Won	30	22	N Meaney (2), J Olam, C Munster, H Grant	N Meaney 5/5		
30 April	9	Bye									
6 May	10 (Note: Magic Round)	South Sydney Rabbitohs	Home	Suncorp Stadium, Brisbane	Lost	12	28	R Smith, B Garlick	N Meaney 2/2		
11 May	11	Brisbane Broncos	Home	AAMI Park, Melbourne	Won	24	16	W Warbrick (2), C Munster, J Olam	N Meaney 4/6		
20 May	12 (Note: Indigenous Round)	Dolphins	Away	Suncorp Stadium, Brisbane	Won	24	16	W Warbrick, C Munster, E Katoa, R Smith	N Meaney 4/4		
27 May	13	Bye									
4 June	14	North Queensland Cowboys	Away	Queensland Country Bank Stadium, Townsville	Lost	20	45	X Coates, J Olam, N Meaney	N Meaney 4/4		
11 June	15	Cronulla-Sutherland Sharks	Home	AAMI Park, Melbourne	Won	54	10	H Grant (2), X Coates (2), T Kamikamica, W Warbrick, J King, R Smith, J Hughes	N Meaney 9/10		
17 June	16	Wests Tigers	Away	Campbelltown Sports Stadium, Sydney	Won	28	6	W Warbrick (4), T Wishart, K Bradley	N Meaney 2/6		
24 June	17	Manly Sea Eagles	Home	AAMI Park, Melbourne	Won	24	6	X Coates (2), J Hughes, J Pezet, N Asofa-Solomona	N Meaney 2/4, J Pezet 0/1		
30 June	18	Penrith Panthers	Home	Marvel Stadium, Melbourne	Lost	16	34	H Grant, N Asofa-Solomona	N Meaney 4/4		
7 July	19	Bye									
15 July	20	Sydney Roosters	Away	Sydney Cricket Ground, Sydney	Won	30	16	X Coates (3), J Hughes, H Grant	N Meaney 5/5		
22 July	21	Newcastle Knights	Away	McDonald Jones Stadium, Newcastle	Lost	18	26	N Meaney, T Loiero, J Olam	N Meaney 3/3		
28 July	22	Parramatta Eels	Home	Marvel Stadium, Melbourne	Won	46	18	H Grant (2), J Hughes, E Katoa, J King, M Seve, C Munster, W Warbrick	N Meaney 7/8		
4 August	23	Penrith Panthers	Away	BlueBet Stadium, Sydney	Lost	6	20	Y Tonumaipea	N Meaney 1/2		
13 August	24	Canberra Raiders	Home	AAMI Park, Melbourne	Won	48	2	C Welch, M Seve, R Smith, E Katoa, T Loeiro, H Grant, C Munster, N Meaney, Y Tonumaipea	N Meaney 6/8, Y Tonumaipea 0/1		
19 August	25	St George Illawarra Dragons	Away	WIN Stadium, Wollongong	Won	38	28	W Warbrick (3), E Katoa (2), X Coates, J Hughes	N Meaney 5/8	C Munster 0/1	
26 August	26	Gold Coast Titans	Home	AAMI Park, Melbourne	Won	37	16	X Coates (3), W Warbrick, C Welch, E Katoa	N Meaney 6/7	C Munster 1/1	
31 August	27	Brisbane Broncos	Away	Suncorp Stadium, Brisbane	Won	32	22	G Anderson (2), S Fa'alogo (2), R Papenhuyzen, R Smith	R Papenhuyzen 4/6		

Fixture notes:

=== Finals ===
First qualifying final

Friday, 8 September
19:50 AEST (UTC+10)

Brisbane Broncos	26 – 0	Melbourne Storm
Tries: 4 Staggs 8'; Walsh 51'; Riki 54'; Cobbo 74'; Goals: 5 Reynolds 9', pen 39', 52', 55', 75' (5/5); Field goals: 0 Reynolds (0/1)	1st: 8–0; 2nd: 18–0; Report

Suncorp Stadium, Brisbane
Attendance: 50,017
Referee: Grant Atkins
Bunker: Chris Butler
Touch judges: Drew Oultram, Michael Wise

First semi final

Friday, 15 September
19:50 AEST (UTC+10)

Melbourne Storm	18 – 13	Sydney Roosters
Tries: 3 Wishart 8'; Seve 26'; Warbrick 79'; Goals: 3 Meaney pen 17', pen 58', 80' (3/5); Field goals: 0 Wishart (0/1)	1st: 10–6; 2nd: 8–7; Report	Tries: 2 B Smith 34'; Collins 66'; Goals: 2 Walker 35', 68' (2/2); Field goals: 1 Walker 72' 1 pt (1/1)

AAMI Park, Melbourne
Attendance: 19,534
Referee: Ashley Klein
Bunker: Chris Butler
Touch judges: Drew Oultram, Chris Sutton

First preliminary final

Friday, 22 September
19:50 AEST (UTC+10)

Penrith Panthers	38 – 4	Melbourne Storm
Tries: 6 To'o 4', 21', 70'; Turuva 28'; Cleary 54'; Edwards 56'; Goals: 7 Cleary pen 17', 23', 30', 55', 57', 71', pen 75'	1st: 18–4; 2nd: 20–0; Report	Tries: 1 Olam 11'; Goals: 0 Meaney (0/1)

Accor Stadium, Sydney
Attendance: 35,578
Referee: Adam Gee
Bunker: Grant Atkins
Touch judges: Chris Sutton, Dave Munro

== Ladder ==
2023 NRL season
Pos	Team	Pld	W	D	L	B	PF	PA	PD	Pts
1	Penrith Panthers (P)	24	18	0	6	3	645	312	+333	42
2	Brisbane Broncos	24	18	0	6	3	639	425	+214	42
3	Melbourne Storm	24	16	0	8	3	627	459	+168	38
4	New Zealand Warriors	24	16	0	8	3	572	448	+124	38
5	Newcastle Knights	24	14	1	9	3	626	451	+175	35
6	Cronulla-Sutherland Sharks	24	14	0	10	3	619	497	+122	34
7	Sydney Roosters	24	13	0	11	3	472	496	−24	32
8	Canberra Raiders	24	13	0	11	3	486	623	−137	32
9	South Sydney Rabbitohs	24	12	0	12	3	564	505	+59	30
10	Parramatta Eels	24	12	0	12	3	587	574	+13	30
11	North Queensland Cowboys	24	12	0	12	3	546	542	+4	30
12	Manly Warringah Sea Eagles	24	11	1	12	3	545	539	+6	29
13	Dolphins	24	9	0	15	3	520	631	−111	24
14	Gold Coast Titans	24	9	0	15	3	527	653	−126	24
15	Canterbury-Bankstown Bulldogs	24	7	0	17	3	438	769	−331	20
16	St. George Illawarra Dragons	24	5	0	19	3	474	673	−199	16
17	Wests Tigers	24	4	0	20	3	385	675	−290	14

== Coaching staff ==
- Craig Bellamy – Head Coach
- Marc Brentnall – Assistant Coach
- Aaron Bellamy – Assistant Coach
- Ryan Hinchcliffe – Assistant Coach
- Todd Lowrie – Assistant Coach
- Frank Ponissi – General Manager - Football
- Billy Slater – Specialist Coach (Part-time)
- Cooper Cronk – Specialist Coach (Consultant)
- Joel Selwood – Leadership Coach
- Matt Duffie – Pathways Coach
- Tim Glasby – Recruitment Officer and Pathways Manager
- Mark Russell – Under-21s Head Coach
- Matt Church – Brisbane Tigers Feeder Club Coach
- Brad Henderson – Sunshine Coast Falcons Feeder Club Coach

== 2023 squad ==
List current as of 29 August 2023

Cap	Nat.	Player name	Position	First Storm game	Previous First Grade RL club (Note: Previous First Grade RL club: This column denotes the previous RL club the player was signed to and played first grade RL for. If they are yet to debut then this is stipulated. If they were merely signed to the club but did not play then it is not counted)
154	(Samoa)	Young Tonumaipea	WG, FB	2014	(Australia) Melbourne Storm
160	(Australia)	Cameron Munster	FE, FB	2014	(Australia) Melbourne Storm
166	(New Zealand)	Nelson Asofa-Solomona	SR, PR	2015	(Australia) Melbourne Storm
167	(Australia)	Christian Welch	SR, PR	2015	(Australia) Melbourne Storm
181	(Fiji)	Tui Kamikamica	SR, PR	2017	(Australia) Melbourne Storm
184	(New Zealand)	Jahrome Hughes	FE, FB	2017	(Australia) North Queensland Cowboys
187	(Papua New Guinea)	Justin Olam	WG, CE	2018	(Australia) Melbourne Storm
188	(Australia)	Harry Grant	HK	2018	(Australia) Melbourne Storm
192	(Australia)	Tom Eisenhuth	SR	2019	(Australia) Penrith Panthers
193	(Samoa)	Marion Seve	WG	2019	(Australia) Melbourne Storm
194	(Australia)	Ryan Papenhuyzen	FB	2019	(Australia) Melbourne Storm
201	(Australia)	Chris Lewis	SR	2020	(Australia) Melbourne Storm
207	(New Zealand)	Aaron Pene	PR	2020	(Australia) New Zealand Warriors
209	(Tonga)	George Jennings	WG	2021	(Australia) Parramatta Eels
210	(New Zealand)	Reimis Smith	WG	2021	(Australia) Canterbury Bulldogs
212	(Australia)	Trent Loiero	SR	2021	(Australia) Melbourne Storm
213	(Samoa)	Dean Ieremia	WG	2021	(Australia) Melbourne Storm
214	(Australia)	Jordan Grant	PR	2021	(Australia) Melbourne Storm
215	(Cook Islands)	Tepai Moeroa	SR, LK	2021	(Australia) Parramatta Eels
217	(Papua New Guinea)	Xavier Coates	WG	2022	(Australia) Brisbane Broncos
218	(Australia)	Nick Meaney	FB	2022	(Australia) Canterbury Bulldogs
219	(Australia)	Josh King	PR	2022	(Australia) Newcastle Knights
220	(Australia)	Tyran Wishart	FE, HK	2022	(Australia) Melbourne Storm
221	(Australia)	Alec MacDonald	LK	2022	(Australia) Melbourne Storm
222	(Australia)	Grant Anderson	CE	2022	(Australia) Melbourne Storm
223	(New Zealand)	Jayden Nikorima	FE, HK	2022	(Australia) Sydney Roosters
225	(New Zealand)	William Warbrick	CE, WG	2023	(Australia) Melbourne Storm
226	(Tonga)	Eliesa Katoa	SR	2023	(Australia) New Zealand Warriors
227	(Australia)	Bronson Garlick	LK, SR	2023	(Australia) Melbourne Storm
228	(Australia)	Kane Bradley	WG, CE	2023	(Australia) North Queensland Cowboys
229	(Australia)	Jonah Pezet	HB	2023	(Australia) Melbourne Storm
230	(Fiji)	Tariq Sims	PR, SR	2023	(Australia) St. George Illawarra Dragons
231	(Samoa)	Sualauvi Fa'alogo	FB, WG	2023	(Australia) Melbourne Storm
232	(Australia)	Jack Howarth	SR	2023	(Australia) Melbourne Storm
233	(France)	Joe Chan	SR	2023	(France) Catalans Dragons
–	(Australia)	Scott Galeano	CE	Yet to debut	(Australia) Melbourne Storm
–	(Australia)	Cole Geyer	HK	Yet to debut	(Australia) Melbourne Storm
–	(Australia)	Ammaron Gudgeon	FB	Yet to debut	(Australia) Melbourne Storm
–	(Australia)	Max Lehmann	WG	Yet to debut	(Australia) Melbourne Storm
–	(Australia)	Charlie Murray	LK, HK	Yet to debut	(Australia) Melbourne Storm
–	(Australia)	Josh Patson	SR	Yet to debut	(Australia) Melbourne Storm
–	(Australia)	Tristan Powell	PR	Yet to debut	(Australia) Melbourne Storm
–	(Australia)	Keagan Russell-Smith	FE, HB	Yet to debut	(Australia) Melbourne Storm
–	(Australia)	Lazarus Vaalepu	PR	Yet to debut	(Australia) Melbourne Storm
–	(Australia)	Cody Williamson	CE	Yet to debut	(Australia) Melbourne Storm

== Player movements ==
Losses

- Jesse Bromwich to Dolphins
- Kenneath Bromwich to Dolphins
- Cooper Johns to Manly Sea Eagles
- Felise Kaufusi to Dolphins
- David Nofoaluma to Wests Tigers (Note: 2022 player loan deal: Nofoaluma returned to his original club at the end of 2022)
- Brandon Smith to Sydney Roosters

Gains

- Joe Chan from Catalans Dragons
- Eliesa Katoa from New Zealand Warriors
- Aaron Pene from New Zealand Warriors
- Tariq Sims from St. George Illawarra Dragons

== Representative honours ==
This table lists all players who have played a representative match in 2023. (Note: Nelson Asofa-Solomona was selected to represent the Māori All Stars for the 2023 All Stars match, but later withdrew from the squad. Christian Welch was selected as a reserve player for Queensland ahead of State of Origin I in Adelaide.)

Player	State of Origin 1	State of Origin 2	State of Origin 3	Test matches 2023 Pacific Rugby League Championships
Nelson Asofa-Solomona	—N/a	—N/a	—N/a	New Zealand
Xavier Coates	—N/a	Queensland	Queensland	—N/a
Sualauvi Fa'alogo	—N/a	—N/a	—N/a	Samoa
Harry Grant	Queensland	Queensland	Queensland	Australia
Jahrome Hughes	—N/a	—N/a	—N/a	New Zealand
Tui Kamikamica	—N/a	—N/a	—N/a	Fiji (c)
Eliesa Katoa	—N/a	—N/a	—N/a	Tonga
Cameron Munster	Queensland	Queensland	Queensland	Australia
Justin Olam	—N/a	—N/a	—N/a	Papua New Guinea
Marion Seve	—N/a	—N/a	—N/a	Samoa
Young Tonumaipea	—N/a	—N/a	—N/a	Samoa

Additionally, Joe Chan, Jack Howarth and Will Warbrick were selected by the New Zealand "A" team for a match against Tonga in October.

== Statistics ==
This table contains playing statistics for all Melbourne Storm players to have played in the 2023 NRL season.

- Statistics sources:

Name	Appearances	Tries	Goals	Field goals	Points
Grant Anderson	4 (Note: Grant Anderson was an unused interchange player in the Round 5 match against South Sydney, and the Round 12 match against the Dolphins. He does not gain official appearances for these matches.)	2	0	0	8
Nelson Asofa-Solomona	20	3	0	0	12
Kane Bradley	2	1	0	0	4
Joe Chan	1	0	0	0	0
Xavier Coates	21	16	0	0	64
Tom Eisenhuth	18	0	0	0	0
Sualauvi Fa'alogo	1	2	0	0	8
Bronson Garlick	22	1	0	0	4
Harry Grant	25	9	0	0	36
Jordan Grant	2	0	0	0	0
Jack Howarth	1	0	0	0	0
Jahrome Hughes	22	7	0	0	28
George Jennings	2	0	0	0	0
Tui Kamikamica	21	1	0	0	4
Eliesa Katoa	21	6	0	0	24
Josh King	26	3	0	0	12
Chris Lewis	1	0	0	0	0
Trent Loiero	26	2	0	0	8
Alec MacDonald	12	0	0	0	0
Nick Meaney	25	10	91	0	222
Tepai Moeroa	6	0	0	0	0
Cameron Munster	22	8	1	1	35
Jayden Nikorima	1	0	0	0	0
Justin Olam	17	6	0	0	24
Ryan Papenhuyzen	3	1	4	0	12
Aaron Pene	8	0	0	0	0
Jonah Pezet	7	2	2	0	12
Marion Seve	10	3	0	0	12
Tariq Sims	15	1	0	0	4
Reimis Smith	22	5	0	0	20
Young Tonumaipea	9	3	0	0	12
William Warbrick	25	17	0	0	68
Christian Welch	25	2	0	0	8
Tyran Wishart	14	2	0	0	8
34 players used	—	113	98	0/1	649

=== Scorers ===
Most points in a game: 18

- Round 3 – Nick Meaney (2 tries, 5 goals) vs Gold Coast Titans
- Round 8 – Nick Meaney (2 tries, 5 goals) vs New Zealand Warriors
- Round 15 – Nick Meaney (9 goals) vs Cronulla-Sutherland Sharks

Most tries in a game: 4

- Round 16 – Will Warbrick vs Wests Tigers

=== Winning games ===
Highest score in a winning game: 54 points

- Round 15 vs Cronulla-Sutherland Sharks

Lowest score in a winning game: 16 points

- Round 1 vs Parramatta Eels

Greatest winning margin: 46 points

- Round 24 vs Canberra Raiders

Greatest number of games won consecutively: 4

- Rounds 24–27

=== Losing games ===
Highest score in a losing game: 34 points

- Round 3 vs Gold Coast Titans

Lowest score in a losing game: 0 points

- Qualifying final vs Brisbane Broncos

Greatest losing margin: 34 points

- Preliminary final vs Penrith Panthers

Greatest number of games lost consecutively: 2

- Rounds 2–3

== Jerseys ==
In December 2020, Melbourne Storm announced a five-year sponsorship and apparel partnership agreement with British sportswear company, Castore. They will continue produce supporter wear and jerseys for season 2023.

Home

Revealed in December 2022, the 2023 home jersey sees the return of the colour purple as the primary colour. The design is similar to that worn in 2021–22 with front and back panels featuring a purple V pattern repeating all the way down the jersey, headed by a large purple V across the chest. Among the special features Castore has incorporated in the jersey are bright yellow lightning bolt design on the sides and the inclusion of a Big V logo on the inner collar as a continuation of the Our Home, Victoria acknowledgment which began during the 2020 season to honor Storm's home state. There is a small mark on the back of the jersey to recognise the club's 25th anniversary.

Away

The away jersey, worn when the home jersey creates a clash with the opposition, is also new design for 2023. The white jersey features a single purple centre stripe down the front of the jersey with purple trimming; it will be worn with white shorts (for the first time since 2014), and white socks with purple cuffs.

Heritage

In the club's first home game, Melbourne wore a replica design based on the club's first home jersey from 1998. The player's versions of the jersey had information about their counterpart from the 1998 first home game against North Sydney. The design was later worn in round 22 against the Parramatta Eels when Melbourne celebrated the club's 25th anniversary.

ANZAC Day

Melbourne wore a specially designed jersey for the annual ANZAC Day match against the Warriors in round 8 at AAMI Park. The jersey was a variation of the home jersey which featured a chevron of red poppies across the chest, together with the ANZAC Appeal logo above the club logo.

Indigenous

Designed by Shanai Kellett, the great granddaughter of Sir Douglas Nicholls, the jersey uses the white away jersey as a base with artwork entitled Resilience that "highlights the footprints that each player takes on their journey throughout the club, teaching you to be humble, resilient, have respect and the importance of kin." The jersey was worn in two matches, against the Dolphins in round 12 during the NRL's Indigenous Round, and against the Sharks at AAMI Park in round 15.

== Junior competitions ==
In October 2022, Melbourne formalised a new partnership with NRL Victoria to rebrand the Victoria Thunderbolts Under-19 S. G. Ball Cup and Under-21 Jersey Flegg Cup teams to play under the Melbourne Storm brand. Both teams had been playing as the Thunderbolts since 2018, following the end of the NRL Under-20s competition. Melbourne Storm General Manager Football, Frank Ponissi saying "while the Thunderbolts have been a good development program for our local elite players, we want to build a system that delivers a stronger connection with Storm and provides the incentive for local players to one day play for Storm at AAMI Park. Not only will the SG Ball and Jersey Flegg teams play under our name, but players will wear Storm colours, train in Storm kit and have access to our coaches and staff throughout the year to help in their training and development."

Melbourne had previously entered a team in the S. G. Ball Cup from 2009 to 2014.

=== Storm Academy ===
On 6 December 2022, the club announced the first members of the relaunched Storm Academy, with players who will form the basis of the club's rebranded Jersey Flegg Cup team. The players were as follows:

- Sheldon Diaz (Melbourne, VIC)
- Matt Hill (Kununurra, NT)
- Angus Hinchey (Brisbane, QLD)
- Stanley Huen (Ipswich, QLD)
- Mitchell Jennings (Sunshine Coast, QLD)
- Poasi Manu (Brisbane, QLD)
- Jared Nauma (Melbourne, VIC)
- K-Ci Newton-Whare (Christchurch, NZ)
- Suliasi Prescott (Melbourne, VIC)
- Keagan Russell-Smith (Penrith, NSW)
- Gabriel Satrick (Yarrabah, QLD)
- Karauria Stokes-Mauahara (Gold Coast, QLD)
- Coby Williamson (Yeppoon, QLD)

=== Jersey Flegg Cup ===
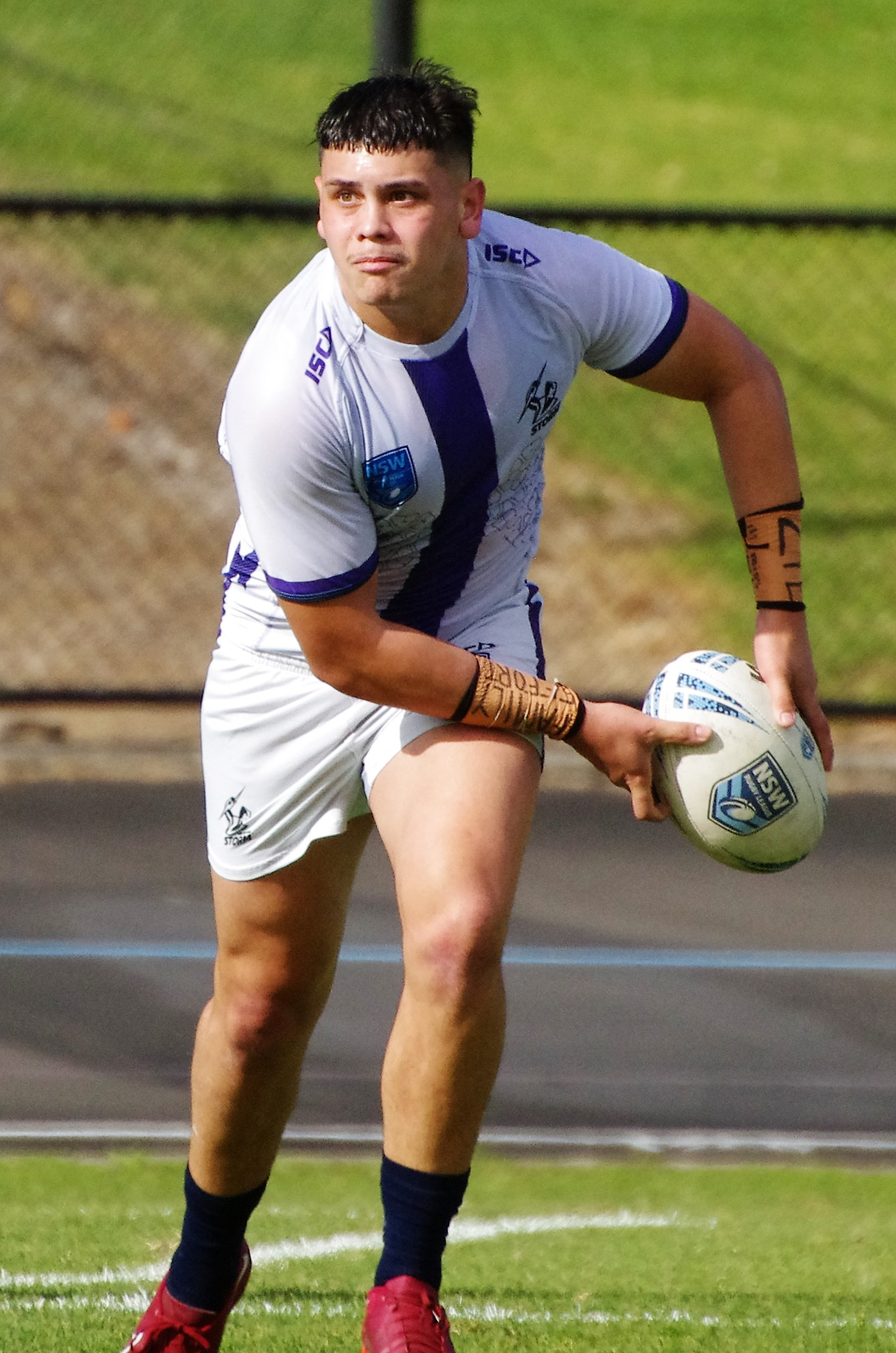
Stanley Huen won the club's Darren Bell Medal as the Under-21s player of the year.

Mark Russell was appointed coach of the Melbourne Storm Jersey Flegg Cup squad, coming to the club after coaching the Sydney Roosters S.G. Ball squad in 2021 and 2022. Working with Storm Academy coach Matt Duffie, the squad was made up of a number of players from Victoria and elsewhere.

After a mixed start to the season, a six-match winning streak from round 9 through round 16 put the team in contention to make the competitions finals. However, a final minute loss to the Canberra Raiders in the last match of the season played at AAMI Park, saw the team drop to sixth on the ladder to miss the finals.

2023 Jersey Flegg Cup
Pos	Team	Pld	W	D	L	B	PF	PA	PD	Pts
6	Melbourne Storm	22	11	0	11	4	462	474	−12	30

=== S. G. Ball Cup ===
Under coach Jason Warr, Melbourne struggled during the S.G. Ball Cup season, winning just one match against the Wests Tigers in round 8 to finish with the wooden spoon. Home matches were played at Comely Banks Recreation Reserve, the home of NRL Victoria team Pakenham Eels. Captain Josiah Ekkehard-Neli, and Storm Academy player Suliasi Prescott were two of the team's better players across the season.

== Awards ==
=== Trophy Cabinet ===
- Michael Moore Trophy (Round 8)

=== Melbourne Storm Awards Night ===
Held at Q Events Melbourne on Tuesday, 3 October.

- Cameron Smith Player of the Year: Xavier Coates
- Billy Slater Rookie of the Year: Will Warbrick
- Melbourne Storm Members' Player of Year: Nick Meaney
- Melbourne Storm Most Improved: Bronson Garlick
- Melbourne Storm Best Back: Will Warbrick
- Melbourne Storm Best Forward: Josh King
- Cooper Cronk Feeder Club Player of the Year: Sualauvi Fa'alogo
- Mick Moore Club Person of the Year: Katie Holley
- Chairman's Award: Jonathan Demos
- Darren Bell Medal (Jersey Flegg Cup U21s Player of the Year): Poasi Manu
- Greg Brentnall Young Achievers Award (S.G. Ball Cup Player of the Year): Dickie Terepo
- Melbourne Storm Academy Player of the Year: Keagan Russell-Smith
- Best Try: Sualauvi Fa'alogo (Round 27 vs Brisbane Broncos)
- Life Member Inductees: Paul Bunn, Justin Dixon, Tawera Nikau

=== Dally M Awards Night ===
Held at Randwick Racecourse, Sydney on Wednesday, 27 September.

- Dally M Hooker of the Year: Harry Grant

=== Rugby League Players' Association Awards ===
- Academic Team of the Year: Tyran Wishart
- RLPA Five-Eighth of the Year: Cameron Munster
- RLPA Hooker of the Year: Harry Grant

=== Additional awards ===
- I Don't Quit Iron Bar: Tyran Wishart
- Spirit of ANZAC Medal: Nick Meaney
- Donate Life Most Courageous Player Award: Marion Seve
- Ken Stephen Medal nominee and NRL Community team of the Year: Jayden Nikorima
