= De La Salle College Caringbah =

De La Salle College, Caringbah

Location
- 389 Port Hacking Road Caringbah, NSW 2229; Caringbah, Sydney, New South Wales; Australia; 34°02′41.9″S 151°07′20″E

Information
- Type: Independent comprehensive co-educational secondary day school
- Motto: Ambulate Digne Deo (Walk worthy of God)
- Religious affiliation: De La Salle Brothers
- Denomination: Roman Catholic
- Patron saint: Saint John Baptist De La Salle
- Established: 1958; 68 years ago
- Founder: De La Salle Brothers
- Oversight: Catholic Education Office, Archdiocese of Sydney
- Principal: Peter Buxton
- Deputy Principals: Mary Matthews
- Dean of Mission: Angela Porro
- Staff: 59
- Teaching staff: 38
- Years: 7–12
- Gender: Male
- Enrolment: c. 458
- Houses: Benildus (Blue); Dermot (Gold); Killian (Orange); Miguel (Red); Solomon (Green)
- Affiliation: Catholic Secondary Schools Association NSW/ACT
- Website: dlscaringbah.syd.catholic.edu.au

De La Salle College Caringbah is an independent Roman Catholic comprehensive single-sex secondary day school for boys, located in Caringbah, a southern suburb of Sydney, New South Wales, Australia. Established in 1958 by the De La Salle Brothers, the college currently caters for around 500 students from Year 7 to Year 12. The current principal is Peter Buxton.

== History ==
De La Salle Caringbah was established in 1958 as a Years 5–10 boys school and eventually settled to educate Year 7–10 students. Our Lady of Mercy College, Burraneer Bay is the Years 7–10 girls school. Students from both schools then transfer to De La Salle Catholic College Cronulla for Years 11–12.

From 2024, both De La Salle Caringbah and Our Lady of Mercy Burraneer will expand to offer Year 11 classes with both schools to be fully Years 7–12 from 2025. Students will still have the transfer to study at De La Salle Cronulla if they wish a co-educational education in their senior years with that school to be fully Year 7–12 from 2027.

De La Salle Caringbah was founded after there was thought to be a need for a Catholic Boys High School in the area. On 28 January 1958, 65 students began the first class in the basement of the old Our Lady of Fatima Church. By 1963 the current college building was built.

== Principals ==
| Ordinal | Officeholder | Term start | Term end | Time in office |
|---|---|---|---|---|
| 1 | Dermot Brosnian | 1958 | 1963 | 6 years |
| 2 | Harry Johnson | 1964 | 1966 | 3 years |
| 3 | Leo Beasley | 1967 | 1970 | 4 years |
| 4 | Dunstan Bourke | 1971 | 1973 | 3 years |
| 5 | Killian "Ray" Ryan | 1974 | 1980 | 7 years |
| 6 | Br Kevin | 1981 | 1985 | 5 years |
| 7 | Unknown | 1986 | 1988 | 3 years |
| 8 | Terry Blanchard | 1988 | 1988 | 1 years |
| 9 | Denis O'Brien | 1989 | 1997 | 9 years |
| 10 | Adrian Watson | 1998 | 1998 | 1 years |
| 11 | Gary Burrows | 1999 | 2008 | 10 years |
| 12 | Michael Egan | 2009 | 2012 | 4 years |
| 13 | Christopher Agnew | 2013 | 2017 | 5 years |
| 14 | Peter Buxton | 2018 | incumbent | 6 years |

== Notable former students ==
- John Della Bosca – politician
- Jonathan Docking – Rugby League player
- Andrew Ettingshausen – Rugby League player
- Steve Hutchins – Senator and ALP president
- John Lee – former Director General of the NSW Department of Premier and Cabinet
- Michael Lee – former Federal Minister
- Jaeman Salmon – Rugby League player
- Tony Sheldon – trade union official
- Mark Vincent – opera singer (winner of Australia's Got Talent 2009)

== See also ==
- List of Catholic schools in New South Wales
- Lasallian educational institutions
- Catholic education in Australia
