= Sean Garlick =

Australian rugby league footballer, former policeman, former actor & businessman

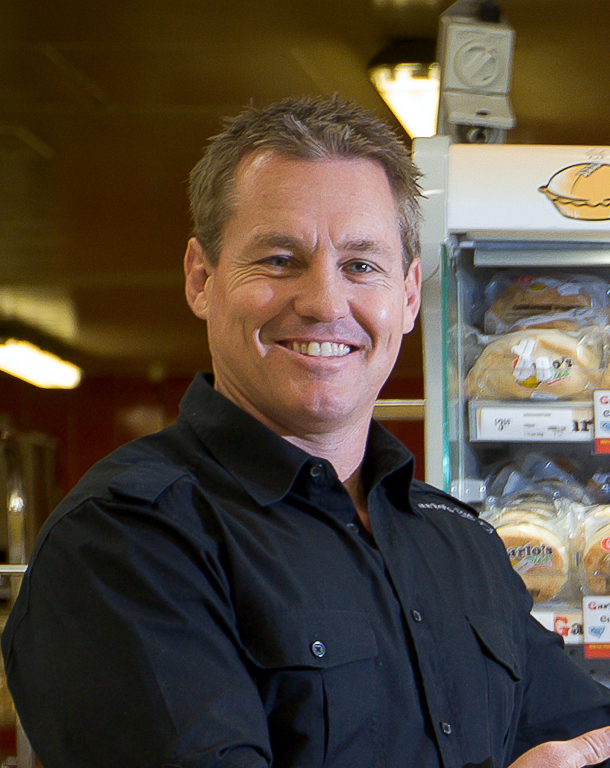
- Born: 6 August 1969 (age 57); Sydney, New South Wales, Australia
- Occupations: Rugby league footballer, policeman, actor, businessman
- Spouse: Samantha Garlick (m. 1992)
- Relatives: Bronson Garlick (son)
- Rugby league career

Playing information
- Position: Hooker
Club
Years	Team	Pld	T	G	FG	P
1990–93	South Sydney	58	8	0	0	32
1994	Eastern Suburbs	12	1	0	0	4
1995–97	Sydney City	52	2	0	0	8
1998–99	South Sydney	38	6	0	0	24
	Total	160	17	0	0	68
- As of 16 Jul 2021
- Website: Garlo's Pies – Sean Garlick

Sean Garlick (born 6 August 1969) is an Australian former professional rugby league footballer, former policeman, former actor and now a businessman. He was educated at Matraville High School from which he graduated in 1987. He began his career as a policeman before becoming a rugby league footballer. A La Perouse Panthers junior, he went on to captain Easts as well as the Rabbitohs in his final season with the Club in 1999.

== Background ==
Sean Garlick was born in Sydney, Australia.

- South Sydney 1990–93 and 1997–99 – 91 first grade games plus 5 replacements. 14 tries for 56 points.
- Eastern Suburbs 1994–96 – 59 first grade games plus 5 replacements. 3 tries for 12 points.

Garlick represented South Sydney from 1990 to 1993 before shifting to arch-rivals, the Eastern Suburbs Roosters, from 1994 to 1996. He returned to the Rabbitohs for three seasons from 1997 to 1999. Garlick was Rabbitohs’ captain in 1999 when the Club was excluded from the National Rugby League and was a leading figure in the Club's efforts to return the Rabbitohs to the elite level of the game. When South Sydney returned to the fold 2002, Garlick was made the Club's Football Operations Manager.

Garlick is currently part of the National Rugby League's NRL Judiciary panel.

A part time actor, he starred in the movie Fortress (1985) with Rachel Ward and in the movie Nightmaster (1988) with Nicole Kidman. He also starred in the series Home and Away (1991) and Rescue: Special Ops (2010).

Sean Garlick is the CEO of Garlo's Pies the company he founded in 2001.
