= Will Smith (rugby league) =

Australian rugby league footballer

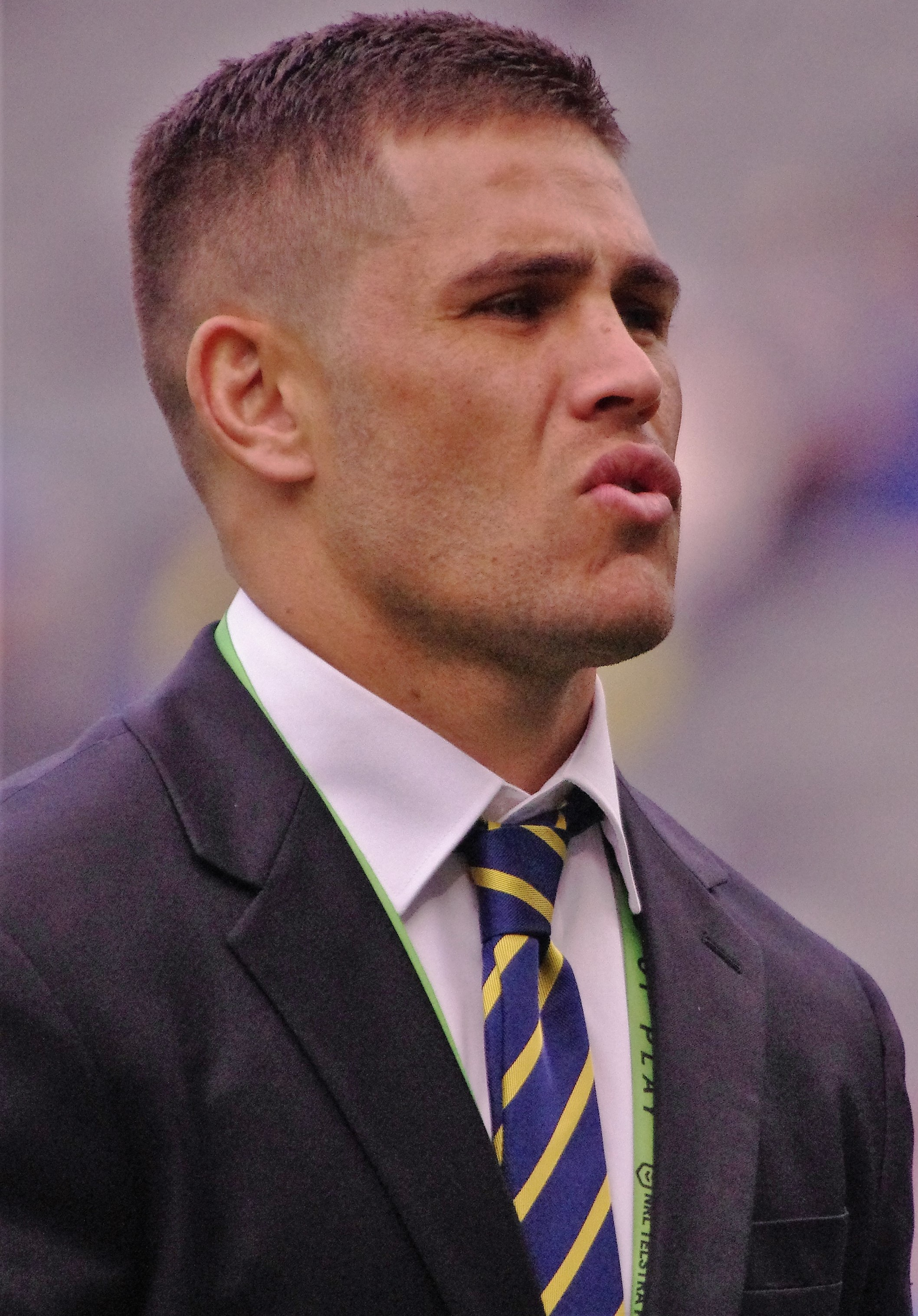

Personal information
- Full name: William Smith
- Born: 3 July 1992 (age 34) Newcastle, New South Wales, Australia
- Height: 178 cm (5 ft 10 in)
- Weight: 88 kg (13 st 12 lb)

Playing information
- Position: Fullback, Five-eighth, Halfback, Hooker
Club
Years	Team	Pld	T	G	FG	P
2014–16	Penrith Panthers	21	2	4	0	16
2017–21	Parramatta Eels	54	9	0	0	36
2022	Gold Coast Titans	9	0	0	0	0
2022	Hull F.C.	7	2	4	0	0
2023	Wests Tigers	4	0	0	0	0
	Total	95	13	8	0	52
Representative
Years	Team	Pld	T	G	FG	P
2016–22	Indigenous All Stars	2	0	0	0	0
- Source: As of 26 August 2023

Will Smith (born 3 July 1992) is an Australian professional rugby league footballer who last played as a five-eighth, fullback and hooker for Wests Tigers in the National Rugby League (NRL).

He previously played for the Gold Coast Titans, Parramatta Eels and the Penrith Panthers in the NRL, Hull F.C. in the English Super League and the Indigenous All Stars.

== Background ==
Smith was born in Newcastle, New South Wales, Australia and is an Indigenous Australian. His grandfather Uncle Bill Smith, who died on 29 August 2021, was a prominent Aboriginal elder in the Newcastle region.

He played his junior football for the Western Suburbs Rosellas in the Newcastle Rugby League. He was then signed by the Newcastle Knights.

== Playing career ==
=== Early career ===
From 2010 to 2012, Smith played for the Newcastle Knights' NYC team. On 28 May 2012, he re-signed with the Newcastle club on a one-year contract.

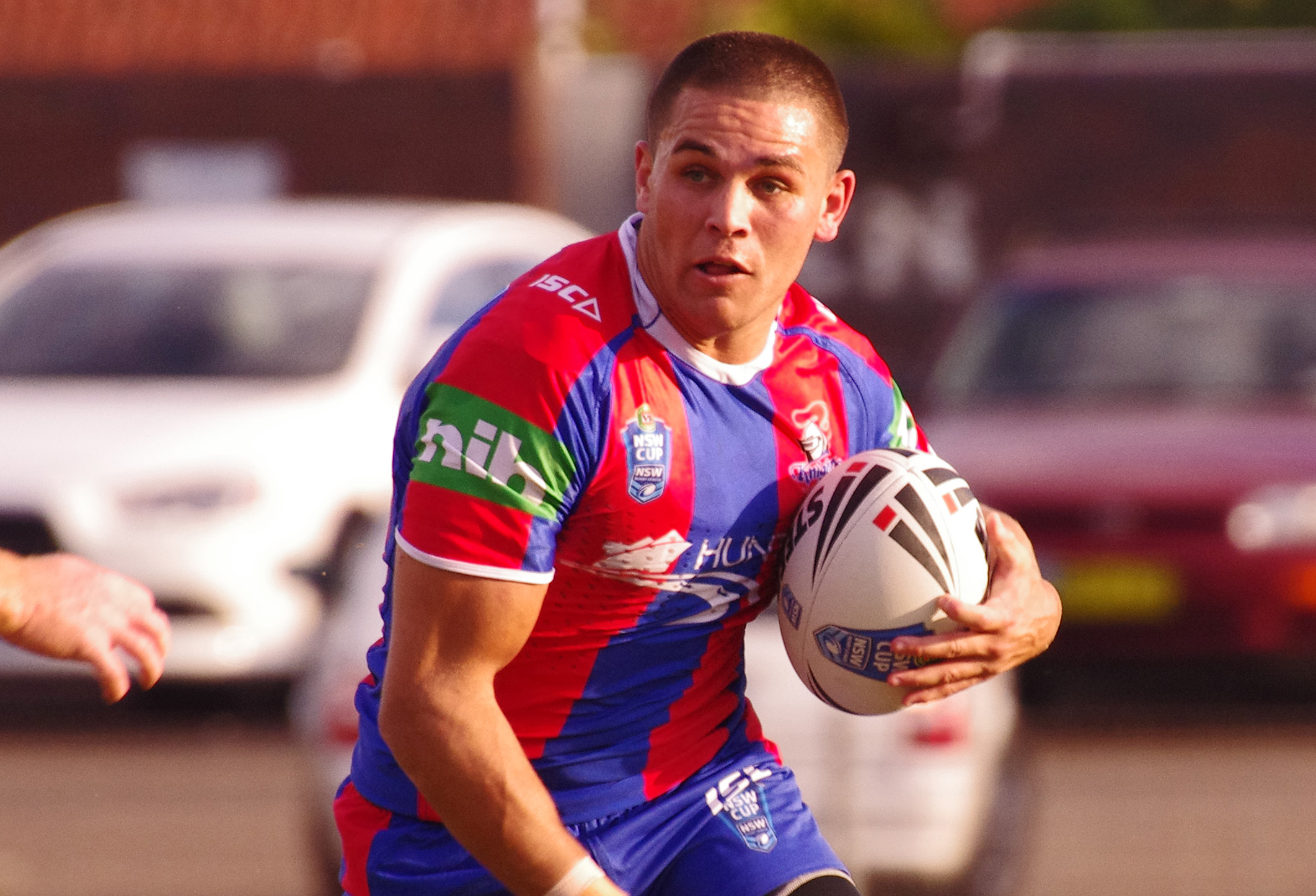
Smith playing for the Knights in 2013

In 2013, he moved on to Newcastle's NSW Cup team. On 25 June 2013, he signed a two-year contract with the Penrith Panthers starting in 2014.

=== 2014 ===
In Round 21 of the 2014 NRL season, Smith made his NRL debut for the Penrith club against Canterbury-Bankstown replacing the injured Peter Wallace. He would go on to play eight games for the Penrith club at five-eighth that year, including two games in the finals. On 21 September, he was named at five-eighth in the 2014 New South Wales Cup Team of the Year.

=== 2015 ===
On 31 January and 1 February 2015, Smith played for Penrith in the 2015 NRL Auckland Nines. He finished off the season playing nine games for the Penrith club scoring two tries and kicking four goals.

=== 2016 ===
On 13 February, Smith played for the Indigenous All Stars against the World All Stars. He was named in the Penrith 2016 NRL Auckland Nines squad.

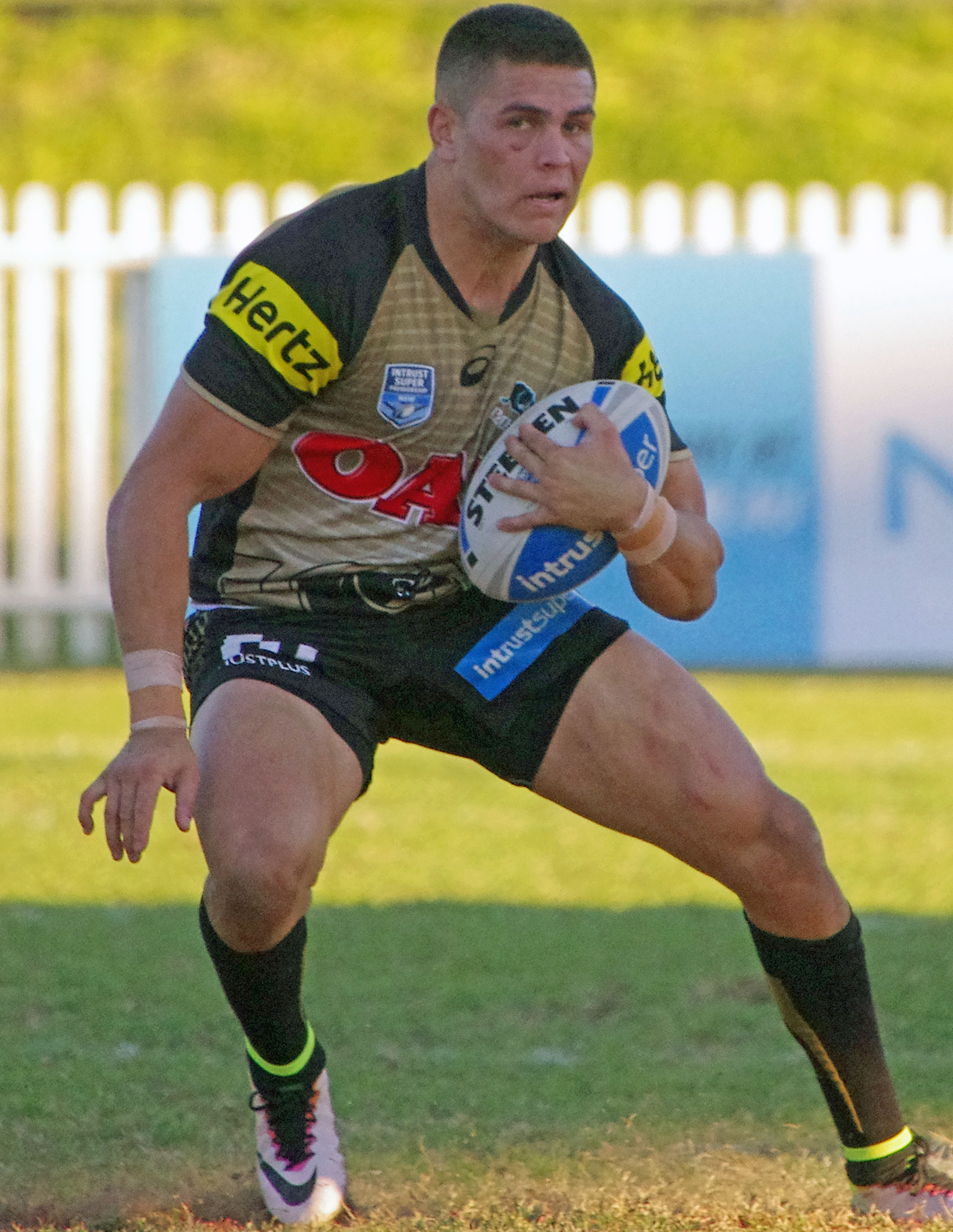
Smith playing for the Panthers in 2016

In November, it was announced that he would be joining the Parramatta Eels in 2017.

=== 2017 ===
Smith made his club debut for Parramatta in round 9 of the 2017 season, playing at five-eighth against the North Queensland Cowboys and scoring a try. On 5 July 2017, Smith resigned with the club on a one-year extension due to good form. With Clint Gutherson and Bevan French injured, Smith moved to fullback and the end of the season, and finished the year of strongly playing 15 games (including two finals) and scoring six tries. In the elimination final match against the North Queensland Cowboys, Smith went from hero to villain in the space of 80 minutes. In the first half, Smith scored a length of the field try to make the score 10–6 at half time to Parramatta. In the second half, North Queensland playmaker Michael Morgan put up a routine bomb, in the resulting play Smith allowed the ball to bounce and did not attempt to catch it. Smith grabbed the ball on the second bounce but North Queensland player John Asiata raced up behind and stole the ball off Smith to score. This changed the momentum of the match and North Queensland went on to win 24–16.

=== 2018 ===
Smith made his first start for Parramatta in round 2 of the 2018 season where they were beaten 54-0 by Manly. On 28 June, Parramatta who were in last place almost managed to pull off one of the upsets of the season when they were leading 18–8 with 7 minutes left to play. In the resulting minutes, Smith threw a forward pass and then in another play attempted a 40/20 kick which went out on the full, thus, giving the ball back to St George and in the next Saints attacking spell they crossed for the match winning try to win 20–18. After spending the next few weeks in reserve grade, Smith was recalled to the Parramatta side against St George in which Parramatta won the match 40–4 with Smith coming off the bench.

=== 2019 ===
Smith played in Parramatta's 20-12 opening round victory over Penrith. Smith was subsequently demoted to reserve grade where he spent the next 2 months. On 14 May, Smith was recalled to the Parramatta side at the expense of Jaeman Salmon who was demoted by coach Brad Arthur after the club were defeated by Melbourne 64–10 at Suncorp Stadium.

Smith made his return to the Parramatta side in Round 10 against North Queensland which ended in a 17–10 loss. Following the club's 42–22 loss against Cronulla in Round 13, Smith was demoted to reserve grade by Brad Arthur and replaced with Jaeman Salmon.

=== 2020 ===
In round 18 of the 2020 NRL season, Smith played his first game for Parramatta in nearly 15 months against Penrith which they lost 20–2 at Penrith Park.

In round 20 against the Wests Tigers, Parramatta won the match 28–24, Smith scored the winning try for Parramatta which ensured they would finish third on the table and finish inside the top four granting the club two chances in the finals series.

In November, he signed a one-year contract extension to remain at Parramatta for the 2021 season.

=== 2021 ===
Smith played a total of 17 games for Parramatta in the 2021 NRL season including both finals matches. Parramatta were eliminated from the competition at the semi-final stage, this time losing to Penrith 8–6 in the lowest scoring match of the year.

On 15 October, Smith signed a two-year deal to join the Gold Coast starting in the 2022 season.

=== 2022 ===
In round 1 of the 2022 NRL season, Smith made his club debut for the Gold Coast against his former club Parramatta. Parramatta would go on to win the match 32–28. On 3 June, Smith was released by the Gold Coast club. Smith had requested the release on compassionate grounds.

On 20 July, Smith signed a short-term contract to join Super League side Hull F.C. until the end of the 2022 season. On 7 November, it was announced that Smith had signed a train and trial contract with the Wests Tigers for the 2023 NRL Preseason.

=== 2023 ===
Smith was limited to only four matches with the Wests Tigers in the 2023 NRL season as the club finished with the Wooden Spoon for a second straight year.

== Post playing ==
In December 2025, Smith had signed on to play for the Lakes United team for the 2026 season.
