= Josh King (rugby league) =

Australian rugby league footballer

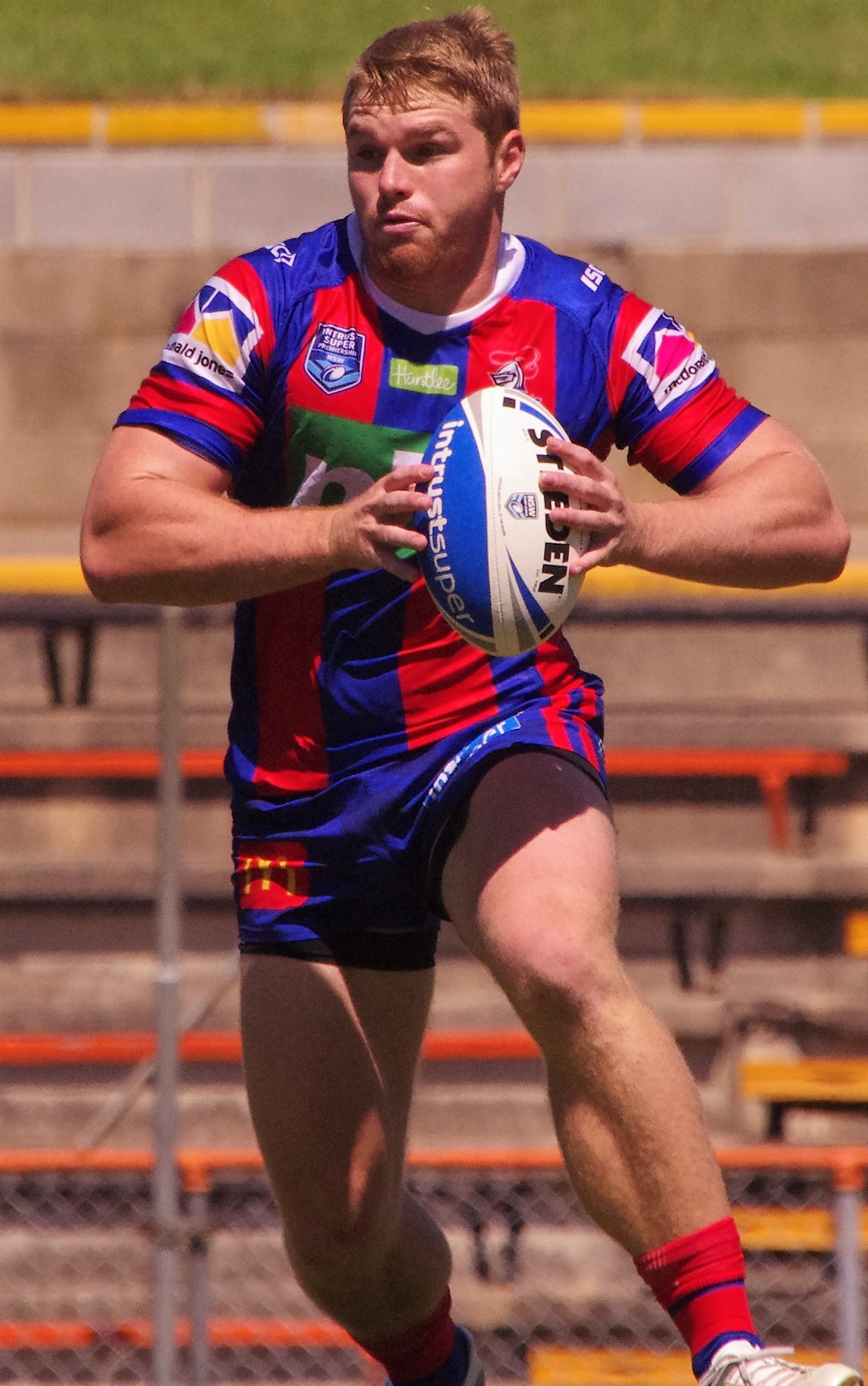

Personal information
- Full name: Joshua King
- Born: 2 December 1995 (age 30) Maitland, New South Wales, Australia
- Height: 187 cm (6 ft 2 in)
- Weight: 105 kg (16 st 7 lb)

Playing information
- Position: Lock, Prop
Club
Years	Team	Pld	T	G	FG	P
2016–21	Newcastle Knights	78	2	0	0	8
2022–	Melbourne Storm	127	14	0	0	56
	Total	205	16	0	0	64
Representative
Years	Team	Pld	T	G	FG	P
2017	NSW Residents	1	0	0	0	0
2022	Prime Minister's XIII	1	0	0	0	0
- Source: As of 5 September 2026

Joshua King (born 2 December 1995) is an Australian professional rugby league footballer who plays as a prop or lock forward for the Melbourne Storm in the National Rugby League.

King previously played for the Newcastle Knights in the NRL.

== Background ==
King was born in Maitland, New South Wales, Australia. He was educated at Singleton High School.

King played his junior rugby league for the Singleton Greyhounds as well as junior representatives for the Newcastle Knights.

== Playing career ==
=== Early career ===
In 2014 and 2015, King played for the Newcastle Knights' NRL Under-20s team, before graduating to their NSW Cup team late in 2015.

=== Newcastle Knights – 2016–2021 ===
In round 7 of the 2016 NRL season, King made his NRL debut for Newcastle against the Brisbane Broncos. King juggled his playing and training commitments with an apprenticeship as an electrician, working in a coal mine near Singleton. He would complete his apprenticeship during his time at the Knights.

On 28 July, he extended his contract with Newcastle until the end of 2018. He finished his debut season with 12 appearances as the club finished last on the table and claimed the Wooden Spoon.

In 2017, King was unable to break into the Knights' NRL side for the first 8 rounds, but went on to play 15 NRL matches for the season as the club finished bottom of the table for a third straight year.

In March 2018, King re-signed with the Knights on a two-year contract until the end of 2020.

King played 13 games for Newcastle in the 2019 NRL season as the club missed the finals finishing in 11th place on the table.

In August, after playing over 70 games for the Knights, King signed a 2-year contract with the Melbourne Storm starting in 2022.

=== Melbourne Storm – 2022–present ===
In round 1 of the 2022 NRL season, King made his club debut for the Melbourne Storm against Wests Tigers which ended in a win at Bankwest Stadium. He had his club debut jersey (cap number 219) presented to him by former Melbourne Storm player Robbie Kearns. King would be the only Melbourne Storm player to play every game in 2022, celebrating his 100th NRL game in round 23. He also made his senior representative debut when he was selected for the Australian Prime Minister's XIII against the Papua New Guinea Prime Minister's XIII in September.

A hard-working forward, King transformed from a bench player playing limited minutes into an almost 80-minute player at Melbourne, missing only one match during the 2023 NRL season only when ordered to take a week off by coach Craig Bellamy. King would be acting captain for the Storm during their round 27 match against the Brisbane Broncos, playing his 50th match for the club during the 2023 NRL finals series. King played in Melbourne's 2023 preliminary final loss against Penrith. King played a total of 26 matches for Melbourne in the 2024 NRL season as the club were runaway minor premiers. King played in Melbourne's 2024 NRL Grand Final loss against Penrith. On 13 March 2025, Melbourne announced that King had extended his contract with the club for a further two years. King played 26 games for Melbourne in the 2025 NRL season including their 26-22 2025 NRL Grand Final loss against Brisbane. King played 24 games for Melbourne in the 2026 NRL season as the club finished 10th on the table, missing the finals for the first time since 2010.

== Statistics ==
Year	Team	Games	Tries	Pts
2016	Newcastle Knights	12		
2017	Newcastle Knights	15		
2018	Newcastle Knights	13		
2019	Newcastle Knights	13		
2020	Newcastle Knights	7	1	4
2021	Newcastle Knights	18	1	4
2022	Melbourne Storm	25	1	4
2023	Melbourne Storm	26	3	12
2024	Melbourne Storm	26	3	12
2025	Melbourne Storm	26	5	20
2026	Melbourne Storm	19	2	8
	Totals	200	16	64
