= Jethro Rinakama =

Fijian-Australian rugby league footballer

Personal information
- Full name: Ratu Jethro Rinakama
- Born: 18 April 2006 (age 20) Australia
- Height: 192 cm (6 ft 4 in)
- Weight: 92 kg (14 st 7 lb)

Playing information
- Position: Wing
Club
Years	Team	Pld	T	G	FG	P
2025–	Canterbury Bulldogs	16	10	0	0	40
Representative
Years	Team	Pld	T	G	FG	P
2025	Fiji	1	0	0	0	0
- Source: As of 14 August 2026

Jethro Rinakama (born 18 April 2006) is a Fiji international rugby league footballer who plays as a winger for the Canterbury-Bankstown Bulldogs in the National Rugby League (NRL).

== Background ==
Rinakama was born in Australia and played his junior football for the Bankstown Bulls and Chester Hill Hornets. A standout in the Bulldogs’ pathway system, he won the 2024 Jersey Flegg Cup premiership and represented both NSW City U18 and NSW U19 sides.

He is the son of Adriu Rinakama, a former Fiji international rugby union utility back.

== Playing career ==
=== 2025 ===
Rinakama burst onto the senior scene in 2025 during the club’s preseason, scoring three tries across two matches. On 20 February 2025, Rinakama signed a contract extension through 2027, committing to Canterbury's long‑term future.

He made his first grade debut in round 19 of the 2025 NRL season, scoring a try in Canterbury's 12–8 win over the North Queensland Cowboys. Rinakama scored the winning try once again the following week against the St. George Illawarra Dragons, crossing over in the 78th minute thanks to a cut-out ball from new recruit, Lachlan Galvin.

=== 2026 ===
Rinakama played 10 matches for Canterbury in the 2026 NRL season scoring seven tries as the club finished 12th on the table.

== International career ==
He was named in the Fiji Bati squad for the 2024 Pacific Championships.
