= Bronson Garlick =

Australian rugby league footballer

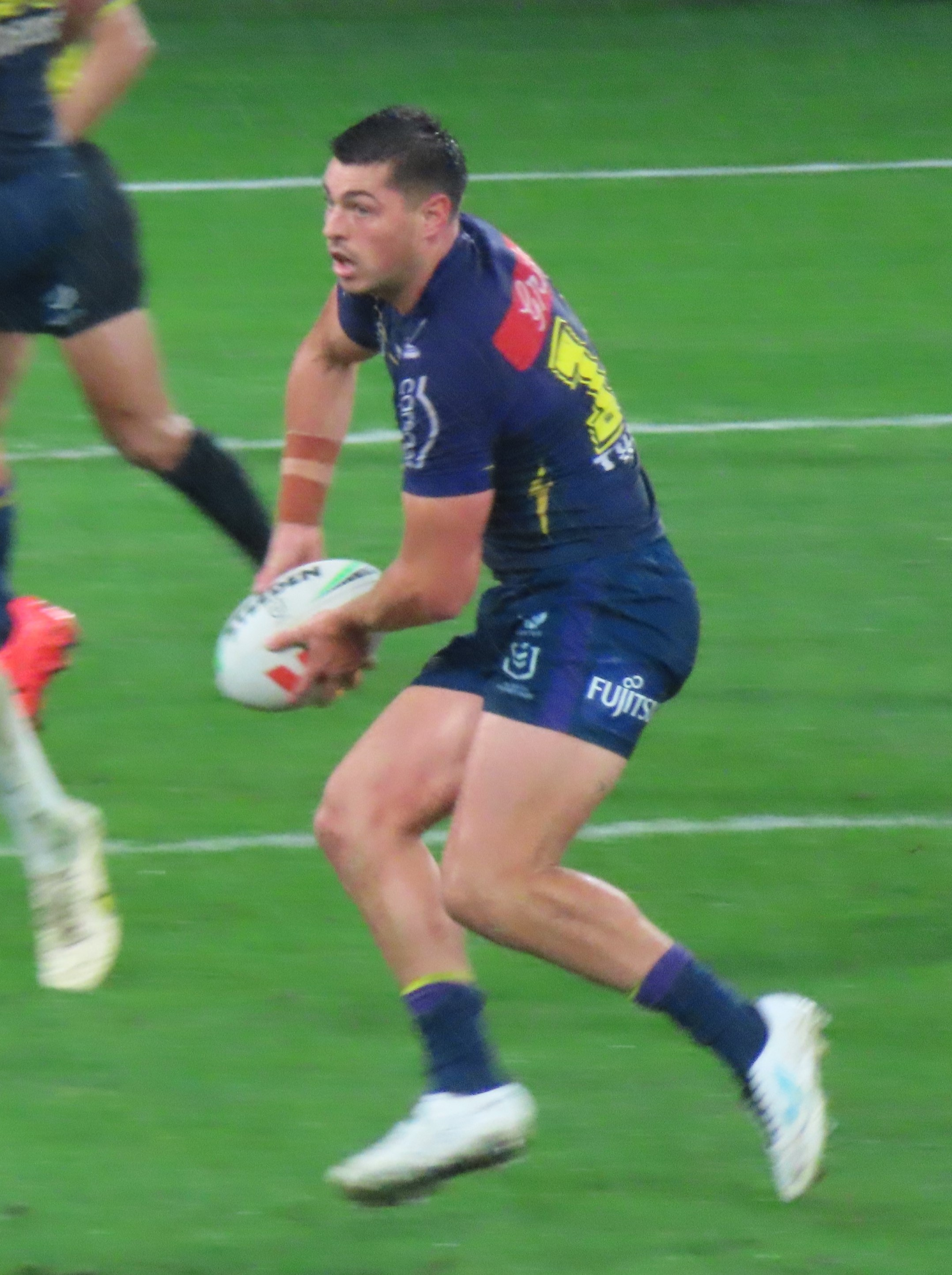

Personal information
- Born: 19 December 1995 (age 30) Sydney, New South Wales, Australia
- Height: 185 cm (6 ft 1 in)
- Weight: 92 kg (14 st 7 lb)

Playing information
- Position: Hooker
Club
Years	Team	Pld	T	G	FG	P
2023–25	Melbourne Storm	39	3	0	0	12
2026–	South Sydney	11	0	0	0	0
	Total	50	3	0	0	12
- Source: As of 24 July 2026
- Father: Sean Garlick

Bronson Garlick (born 19 December 1995) is an Australian professional rugby league footballer who plays as a hooker for the South Sydney Rabbitohs in the National Rugby League (NRL).

== Early life ==
Garlick is the son of former South Sydney Rabbitohs and Sydney Roosters forward Sean Garlick. He played his junior rugby league for the South Eastern Seagulls and was educated at Marcellin College Randwick.

== Playing career ==
=== Early career ===
Garlick was overlooked for the South Sydney Rabbitohs junior representative teams, before finally playing four matches for South Sydney during the 2014 NRL Under-20s season. He would transfer to the Canterbury-Bankstown Bulldogs for the 2015 NRL Under-20s season, scoring two tries in 16 appearances for the Bulldogs.

He would play for the Bulldogs in their 2018 Intrust Super Premiership NSW 18–12 grand final win against the Newtown Jets, playing 26 minutes off the bench in the match. The following week, he would also feature in the Bulldogs comfortable 42–18 win over the Redcliffe Dolphins in the 2018 NRL State Championship grand final.

Garlick would transfer from the Bulldogs back to South Sydney for the 2020 season, but only played one game during the COVID-19 affected year.

In 2021, Garlick played for the Newtown Jets and was appointed club captain for the Jets in the 2021 Knock-On Effect NSW Cup competition. After a number of strong performances scoring 11 tries in just 12 appearances, he was signed by Melbourne to a development contract ahead of the 2022 season.

In 2022, Garlick was allocated by Melbourne to play with the Brisbane Tigers in the Queensland Cup competition.

=== Melbourne Storm ===
Upgraded to the Storm's top-30 roster for the 2023 NRL season, Garlick made his NRL debut for Melbourne against the Parramatta Eels in round 1 of the season, coming off the bench in a 16–12 win at Commbank Stadium. He had his jersey (cap 227) presented to him by his father and former South Sydney Rabbitohs player Sean Garlick. Garlick played 22 games for Melbourne in the 2023 NRL season as the club finished third on the table. Garlick in Melbourne's preliminary final defeat against Penrith.

=== 2024 ===
On 29 September 2024, Garlick played for North Sydney in their NSW Cup Grand Final loss against Newtown.

=== 2025 ===
On 23 May, the South Sydney Rabbitohs announced that they had signed Garlick on a two-year deal.

=== 2026 ===
Garlick played eleven games for South Sydney in the 2026 NRL season as the club finished 6th on the table and qualified for the finals.

== Statistics ==
Year	Team	Games	Tries	Pts
2023	Melbourne Storm	22	1	4
2024	Melbourne Storm	4		
2025	Melbourne Storm	13	2	8
2026	South Sydney Rabbitohs	11		
	Totals	50	3	12
