= Jacob Preston (rugby league) =

Australia international rugby league footballer (born 2001)

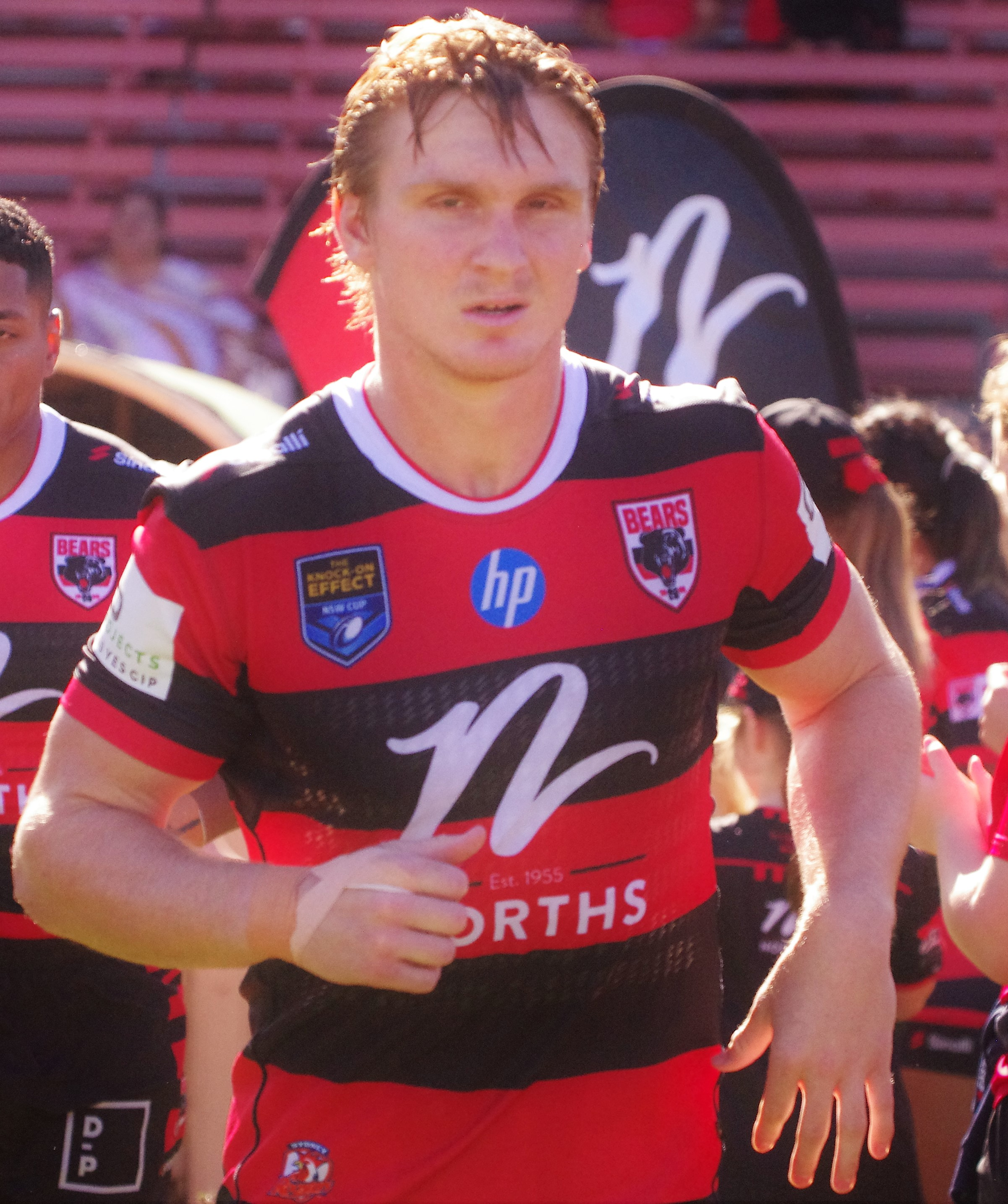

Personal information
- Full name: Jacob Preston
- Born: 11 October 2001 (age 25) Wahroonga, New South Wales, Australia
- Height: 189 cm (6 ft 2 in)
- Weight: 100 kg (15 st 10 lb)

Playing information
- Position: Second-row
Club
Years	Team	Pld	T	G	FG	P
2023–	Canterbury Bulldogs	80	31	0	0	124
Representative
Years	Team	Pld	T	G	FG	P
2026–	Australia	5	3	0	0	12
- Source: As of 16 November 2026

Jacob Preston (born 11 October 2001) is an Australian professional rugby league footballer who plays as a second-rower for the Canterbury-Bankstown Bulldogs in the NRL.

== Background ==
Preston was born in Wahroonga, a suburb on the Upper North Shore region of Sydney. He played his junior rugby league for the Belrose Eagles.

He attended St Augustine's College - Sydney

== Early career ==
In 2021 and 2022, Preston played for the Sydney Roosters in the Jersey Flegg Cup.

== Playing career ==
=== 2023 ===
In 2023, Preston joined the Canterbury-Bankstown Bulldogs. Preston made his first grade debut from the bench in his side's 31−6 loss to the Manly Warringah Sea Eagles at Brookvale Oval in round 1 of the 2023 NRL season. Preston scored his first career try in his side's 26−12 victory over the Melbourne Storm at AAMI Park the following week. In round 5, Preston scored his first career double during Canterbury's golden point win against North Queensland. On 21 April, Preston re-signed with the Canterbury club for four more seasons, finishing at the end of the 2027 NRL season. In round 10, Preston scored two tries in Canterbury's 34–30 loss against Canberra. Preston would have an impressive rookie NRL season, winning the Dr George Peponis Medal as Canterbury's best player during the 2023 season. He would also take home the rookie of the year and member's player of the year awards.

=== 2024 ===
In round 4 of the 2024 NRL season, Preston sustained a fractured jaw in the clubs loss against South Sydney. Preston was subsequently ruled out for at least four weeks. In round 13, Preston scored two tries for Canterbury in their 32-2 victory over Newcastle. In round 14, Preston was taken from the field with a suspected broken ankle during the clubs 22-18 victory over rivals Parramatta. Preston played 18 games for Canterbury in the 2024 NRL season as the club qualified for the finals finishing 6th on the table.

=== 2025 ===
On 6 May, Preston was suspended for four matches after being placed on report for a crusher tackle during Canterbury's round 9 38-18 win over the Gold Coast Titans. In round 26, Preston scored a hat-trick of tries in Canterbury's 28-4 victory over an understrength Penrith side. Preston played 22 games for Canterbury in the 2025 NRL season as the club finished third and qualified for the finals. Canterbury would be eliminated from the finals in straight sets.

=== 2026 ===
On 22 May against the Melbourne Storm, Preston was forced to leave the field due to a broken forearm. On 25 August, Canterbury announced that Preston had re-signed with the club until the end of 2031. Preston played 20 games for Canterbury in the 2026 NRL season as they finished 12th on the table and missed the finals.

== Representative ==
He made his Australia international début in the opening game of the 2026 Rugby League World Cup in the 24-22 win over New Zealand. Preston impressed during the tournament and played 5-times including Australia's eventual win over New Zealand in the final.

== Statistics ==
Year	Team	Games	Tries	Pts
2023	Canterbury-Bankstown Bulldogs	20	6	24
2024	Canterbury-Bankstown Bulldogs	18	6	24
2025	Canterbury-Bankstown Bulldogs	22	12	48
2026	Canterbury-Bankstown Bulldogs	18	6	24
2027	Canterbury-Bankstown Bulldogs			
	Totals	78	30	120

== Honours ==
Representative

- Rugby League World Cup Champion: 2026
