= 2023 NRL finals series =

- Duration: 8 September 2023 – 1 October 2023
- Teams: 8
- Minor premiers: Penrith Panthers
- Matches played: 9
- Highest attendance: 81,947, Penrith v Brisbane, Grand Final
- Lowest attendance: 12,557, Cronulla-Sutherland v Sydney, Second Elimination Final
- Average attendance: 36,582
- Total attendance: 329,242
- Broadcast partners: Nine Network; Fox League

The 2023 National Rugby League finals series was a tournament staged to determine the winner of the 2023 Telstra Premiership season. The series was played over four weekends in September and October, culminating in the 2023 NRL Grand Final on 1 October 2023 won by the Penrith Panthers against the Brisbane Broncos.

The top eight teams from the 2023 NRL season qualified for the finals series. The NRL finals series have been continuously played under this format since 2012.

== Qualification ==
=== Ladder ===
2023 NRL season
Pos	Team	Pld	W	D	L	B	PF	PA	PD	Pts
1	Penrith Panthers (P)	24	18	0	6	3	645	312	+333	42
2	Brisbane Broncos	24	18	0	6	3	639	425	+214	42
3	Melbourne Storm	24	16	0	8	3	627	459	+168	38
4	New Zealand Warriors	24	16	0	8	3	572	448	+124	38
5	Newcastle Knights	24	14	1	9	3	626	451	+175	35
6	Cronulla-Sutherland Sharks	24	14	0	10	3	619	497	+122	34
7	Sydney Roosters	24	13	0	11	3	472	496	−24	32
8	Canberra Raiders	24	13	0	11	3	486	623	−137	32
9	South Sydney Rabbitohs	24	12	0	12	3	564	505	+59	30
10	Parramatta Eels	24	12	0	12	3	587	574	+13	30
11	North Queensland Cowboys	24	12	0	12	3	546	542	+4	30
12	Manly Warringah Sea Eagles	24	11	1	12	3	545	539	+6	29
13	Dolphins	24	9	0	15	3	520	631	−111	24
14	Gold Coast Titans	24	9	0	15	3	527	653	−126	24
15	Canterbury-Bankstown Bulldogs	24	7	0	17	3	438	769	−331	20
16	St. George Illawarra Dragons	24	5	0	19	3	474	673	−199	16
17	Wests Tigers	24	4	0	20	3	385	675	−290	14

== Finals structure ==
The system used for the 2023 NRL finals series is a final eight system. The top four teams in the eight receive the "double chance" when they play in week-one qualifying finals, such that if a top-four team loses in the first week it still remains in the finals, playing a semi-final the next week against the winner of an elimination final. The bottom four of the eight play knock-out games – only the winners survive and move on to the next week. Home ground advantage goes to the team with the higher ladder position in the first two weeks and to the qualifying final winners in the third week.

In the second week, the winners of the qualifying finals receive a bye to the third week. The losers of the qualifying final plays the elimination finals winners in a semi-final. In the third week, the winners of the semi-finals from week two play the winners of the qualifying finals in the first week. The winners of those matches move on to the Grand Final.

== Venues ==
A total of seven different venues hosted matches throughout the finals series.

Venue	Capacity	Matches Hosted	Home team
AAMI Park	30,000	1	Melbourne Storm
Accor Stadium	82,500	2	Penrith Panthers; Grand Final
BlueBet Stadium	22,500	1	Penrith Panthers
Go Media Stadium	30,000	1	New Zealand Warriors
McDonald Jones Stadium	30,000	1	Newcastle Knights
PointsBet Stadium	12,500	1	Cronulla-Sutherland Sharks
Suncorp Stadium	52,500	2	Brisbane Broncos

== Fixtures ==
Nine matches were played across four weeks of the finals series.

Home	Score	Away	Match Information
Home	Score	Away	Date and time (Local)	Venue	Referee	Crowd
Qualifying and Elimination Finals
Brisbane Broncos	26–0	Melbourne Storm	8 September, 7:50 pm	Suncorp Stadium	Grant Atkins	50,157
Penrith Panthers	32–6	New Zealand Warriors	9 September, 4:05 pm	BlueBet Stadium	Adam Gee	21,525
Cronulla-Sutherland Sharks	12–13	Sydney Roosters	9 September, 7:50 pm	PointsBet Stadium	Gerard Sutton	12,557
Newcastle Knights †	30–28	Canberra Raiders	10 September, 4:05 pm	McDonald Jones Stadium	Ashley Klein	29,548
Semi Finals
Melbourne Storm	18–13	Sydney Roosters	15 September, 7:50 pm	AAMI Park	Ashley Klein	19,534
New Zealand Warriors	40–10	Newcastle Knights	16 September, 6:05 pm	Go Media Stadium	Adam Gee	26,083
Preliminary Finals
Penrith Panthers	38–4	Melbourne Storm	22 September, 7:50 pm	Accor Stadium	Adam Gee	35,578
Brisbane Broncos	42–12	New Zealand Warriors	23 September, 7:50 pm	Suncorp Stadium	Gerard Sutton	52,273

† Match decided in extra time.

=== Chart ===
Qualifying and elimination finals
9 September – Sydney
1	Penrith	32
4	New Zealand	6
10 September – Newcastle
5	Newcastle	30
8	Canberra	28
9 September – Sydney
6	Cronulla-Sutherland	12
7	Sydney	13
8 September – Brisbane
2	Brisbane	26
3	Melbourne	0

Semi-finals
16 September – Auckland
New Zealand	40
Newcastle	10
15 September – Melbourne
Melbourne	18
Sydney	13

Preliminary finals
22 September – Sydney
Penrith	38
Melbourne	4
23 September – Brisbane
Brisbane	42
New Zealand	12

Grand final
1 October – Sydney
Penrith	26
Brisbane	24

== Matches ==
=== First Week: Qualifying and Elimination Finals ===
Second Qualifying Final

8 September 2023
19:50 AEST (UTC+10)

Brisbane Broncos	26 – 0	Melbourne Storm

Suncorp Stadium, Brisbane
Attendance: 50,197
Referee: Grant Atkins

First Qualifying Final

9 September 2023
16:05 AEST (UTC+10)

Penrith Panthers	32 – 6	New Zealand Warriors

BlueBet Stadium, Sydney
Attendance: 21,525
Referee: Adam Gee

Second Elimination Final

9 September 2023
19:50 AEST (UTC+10)

Cronulla-Sutherland Sharks	12 – 13	Sydney Roosters

PointsBet Stadium, Sydney
Attendance: 12,557
Referee: Gerard Sutton

First Elimination Final

10 September 2023
16:05 AEST (UTC+10)

Newcastle Knights	30 – 28	Canberra Raiders

McDonald Jones Stadium, Newcastle
Attendance: 29,548
Referee: Ashley Klein

=== Second Week: Semi Finals ===
Second Semi Final

15 September 2023
16:05 AEST (UTC+10)

Melbourne Storm	18 – 13	Sydney Roosters

AAMI Park, Melbourne
Attendance: 19,534
Referee: Ashley Klein

First Semi Final

10 September 2023
16:05 AEST (UTC+10)

New Zealand Warriors	40 – 10	Newcastle Knights

Go Media Stadium, Auckland
Attendance: 26,083
Referee: Adam Gee

=== Third Week: Preliminary Finals ===
First Preliminary Final

22 September 2023
16:05 AEST (UTC+10)

Penrith Panthers	38 – 4	Melbourne Storm

Accor Stadium, Sydney
Attendance: 35,578
Referee: Adam Gee

Second Preliminary Final

23 September 2023
19:50 AEST (UTC+10)

Brisbane Broncos	42 – 12	New Zealand Warriors

Suncorp Stadium, Brisbane
Attendance: 52,273
Referee: Gerard Sutton

== Grand final ==
2023 NRL Grand Final

Sunday, 1 October
19:30 AEDT (UTC+11)

Penrith Panthers	26 – 24	Brisbane Broncos
Tries: 4 Kenny 17'; Leota 62'; Crichton 67'; Cleary 76'; Goals: 5 Crichton 18' (1/1); Cleary pen 29', 63', 68', 78' (4/4)	1st: 8–6; 2nd: 18–18; Report	Tries: 4 Flegler 38'; Mam 44', 52', 54'; Goals: 4 Reynolds 39', 45', 53', 56' (4/4)

Accor Stadium, Sydney
Attendance: 81,947
Referee: Adam Gee
Video referee: Ashley Klein
Touch judges: Chris Sutton, Dave Munro
Clive Churchill Medal: Nathan Cleary (Penrith)
