= Cooper Toy =

Australian rugby league footballer

Personal information
- Born: 2005 or 2006

Playing information
- Position: Centre, Wing
Club
Years	Team	Pld	T	G	FG	P
2026–	Canterbury Bulldogs	1	0	0	0	0
- Source: RLP

Cooper Toy is an Australian rugby league footballer for the Canterbury-Bankstown Bulldogs in the National Rugby League (NRL).

Toy was educated at Port Hacking High School and played junior rugby league for the Gymea Gorillas.

An outside back, Toy was man of the match representing NSW City under-16s in 2021 and came through the junior grades with the Sydney Roosters.

Toy moved to the Bulldogs in 2025. He made his first-grade debut in the penultimate round of the 2026 NRL season against the Penrith Panthers at Western Sydney Stadium, coming on off the bench.
