= Tallyn Da Silva =

Australian rugby league player (born 2005)

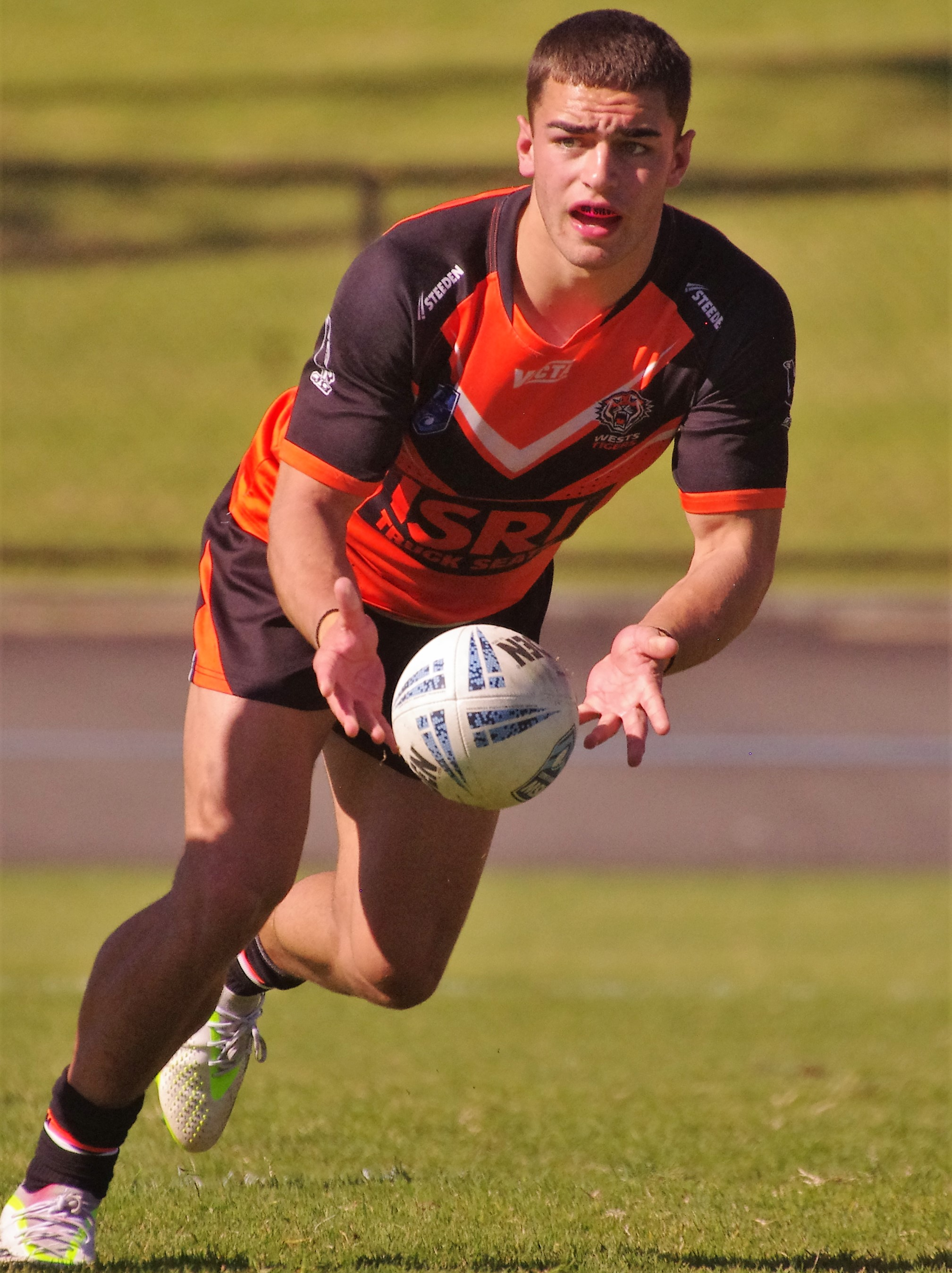

Personal information
- Full name: Tallyn Da Silva
- Born: 20 April 2005 (age 21) Campbelltown, New South Wales, Australia
- Height: 182 cm (6 ft 0 in)
- Weight: 89 kg (14 st 0 lb)

Playing information
- Position: Hooker
Club
Years	Team	Pld	T	G	FG	P
2023–25	Wests Tigers	22	4	1	0	18
2025–	Parramatta Eels	33	13	4	0	60
	Total	55	17	5	0	78
Representative
Years	Team	Pld	T	G	FG	P
2026	Prime Minister's XIII	1	1	0	0	4
- Source: As of 6 November 2026

Tallyn Da Silva (born 20 April 2005) is an Australian professional rugby league footballer who plays as a hooker for the Parramatta Eels in the National Rugby League.

== Background ==
Da Silva grew up in the Campbelltown area, and was educated at Westfields Sports High School. He played his junior career with the East Campbelltown Eagles. He is of Portuguese descent on his father's side

== Playing career ==
Da Silva joined the Wests Tigers in 2023. Da Silva started the season in the S. G. Ball Cup competition, then quickly graduated to the Jersey Flegg Cup competition, before ending up in the NSW Cup competition. Tigers' coach Tim Sheens, who allowed the likes of Benji Marshall and Chris Lawrence to thrive at a very young age noticed Da Silva's efforts, and was fast tracked to the first grade side.

Da Silva made his first grade debut for the Wests Tigers from the bench with regular back-up hooker Jake Simpkin promoted to the starting side in place of the injured Apisai Koroisau, in his side's 28–6 loss to the Melbourne Storm at Campbelltown Stadium in round 16 of the 2023 NRL season

=== 2025 ===
Da Silva signed in a mid season switch to the Parramatta Eels on a four and a half year deal. On 30 June, the Parramatta club confirmed the signing. It was reported that Da Silva wanted to stay at the Wests Tigers but had grown frustrated with a lack of playing time after head coach Benji Marshall elected to give more minutes to Apisai Koroisau. In round 19, Da Silva made his club debut for Parramatta in their 32-10 loss against Penrith.

=== 2026 ===
In August, Da Silva broke the record for most tries by a hooker since 1998 which took his tally for the season to twelve tries. Da Silva played 24 games for Parramatta in the 2026 NRL season as the club finished 13th on the table.

He made his Prime Minister's XIII début on 3 October 2026 in the 10-60 win over PNG Prime Minister's XIII in Port Moresby, scoring a try.

== Statistics ==
Year	Team	Games	Tries	Goals	Pts
2023	Wests Tigers	5			
2024	Wests Tigers	6	1		4
2025	Wests Tigers	11	3	1	14
2025	Parramatta Eels	9	1		4
2026	Parramatta Eels	24	12	4	56
2027	Parramatta Eels				
	Totals	55	17	5	78
