= Faaletino Tavana =

Samoan rugby league footballer (born 2004)

Personal information
- Born: 20 October 2004 (age 22) Apia, Samoa
- Height: 184 cm (6 ft 0 in)
- Weight: 85 kg (13 st 5 lb)

Playing information
- Position: Wing
Club
Years	Team	Pld	T	G	FG	P
2026–	Wests Tigers	8	4	0	0	16
- Source: RLP

Faaletino Tavana (born 20 October 2004), also known as Tino Tavana, is a Samoan rugby league footballer for the Wests Tigers in the National Rugby League (NRL).

== Early life ==
Tavana was born in Apia, Samoa, and later lived in New Zealand, before moving to Australia in 2017. Settling in Sydney, Tavana got his early exposure to rugby league with the Narellan Jets, having mostly played rugby union growing up. He is a product of the West Tigers pathways.

== Career ==
A winger, Tavana was signed by the Wests Tigers on a train-and-trial deal prior to the 2026 season. His acrobatic try in a pre-season trial match against the Roosters earned plaudits and by round four he had broken into first-grade. He made a total of eight NRL appearances in 2026, scoring four tries, and during the season signed a contract extension through to 2029, with his last two years to be as part of their Top 30.
