= Jaeman Salmon =

Australian rugby league footballer

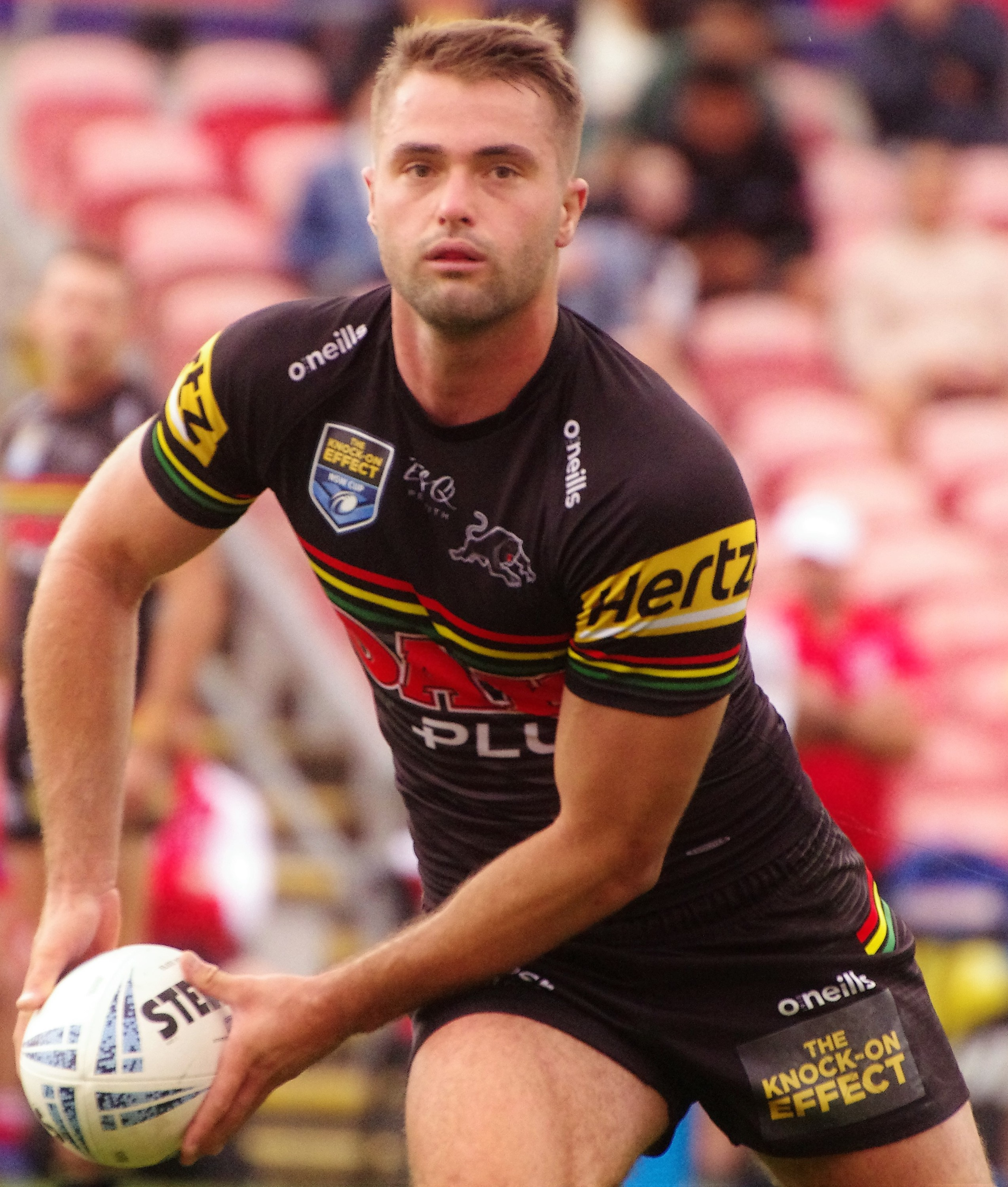

Personal information
- Born: 14 January 1999 (age 27) Caringbah, New South Wales, Australia
- Height: 187 cm (6 ft 2 in)
- Weight: 96 kg (15 st 2 lb)

Playing information
- Position: Lock, Second-row, Five-eighth
Club
Years	Team	Pld	T	G	FG	P
2018–20	Parramatta Eels	17	1	0	0	4
2021–23	Penrith Panthers	44	6	0	0	24
2024–	Canterbury Bulldogs	64	8	0	0	32
	Total	125	15	0	0	60
- Source: As of 3 September 2026

Jaeman Salmon (born 14 January 1999) is a professional rugby league footballer who plays as a lock or second-row forward for the Canterbury-Bankstown Bulldogs in the National Rugby League (NRL).

He previously played for the Parramatta Eels & the Penrith Panthers in the NRL.

== Early life and background ==
Salmon was born in Caringbah in the Sutherland Shire of Southern Sydney. He went to high school at De La Salle College Caringbah. He is of Canadian and Ukrainian descent.

== Playing career ==
=== Cronulla-Sutherland Sharks ===
Salmon started his football career playing Harold Matthews for the Cronulla-Sutherland Sharks. While at Cronulla, Salmon represented NSW at under 16's and 18's level.

=== Parramatta Eels ===
In 2017, Salmon signed with Parramatta on a three-year deal until 2020. Salmon missed the first month of the 2018 season through injury, once returned he played five-eighth for Parramatta's jersey flegg team.

Later, he appeared for Wentworthville Magpies in Intrust Super Premiership playing five-eighth playing 12 games and scoring 4 tries, including a hat-trick.

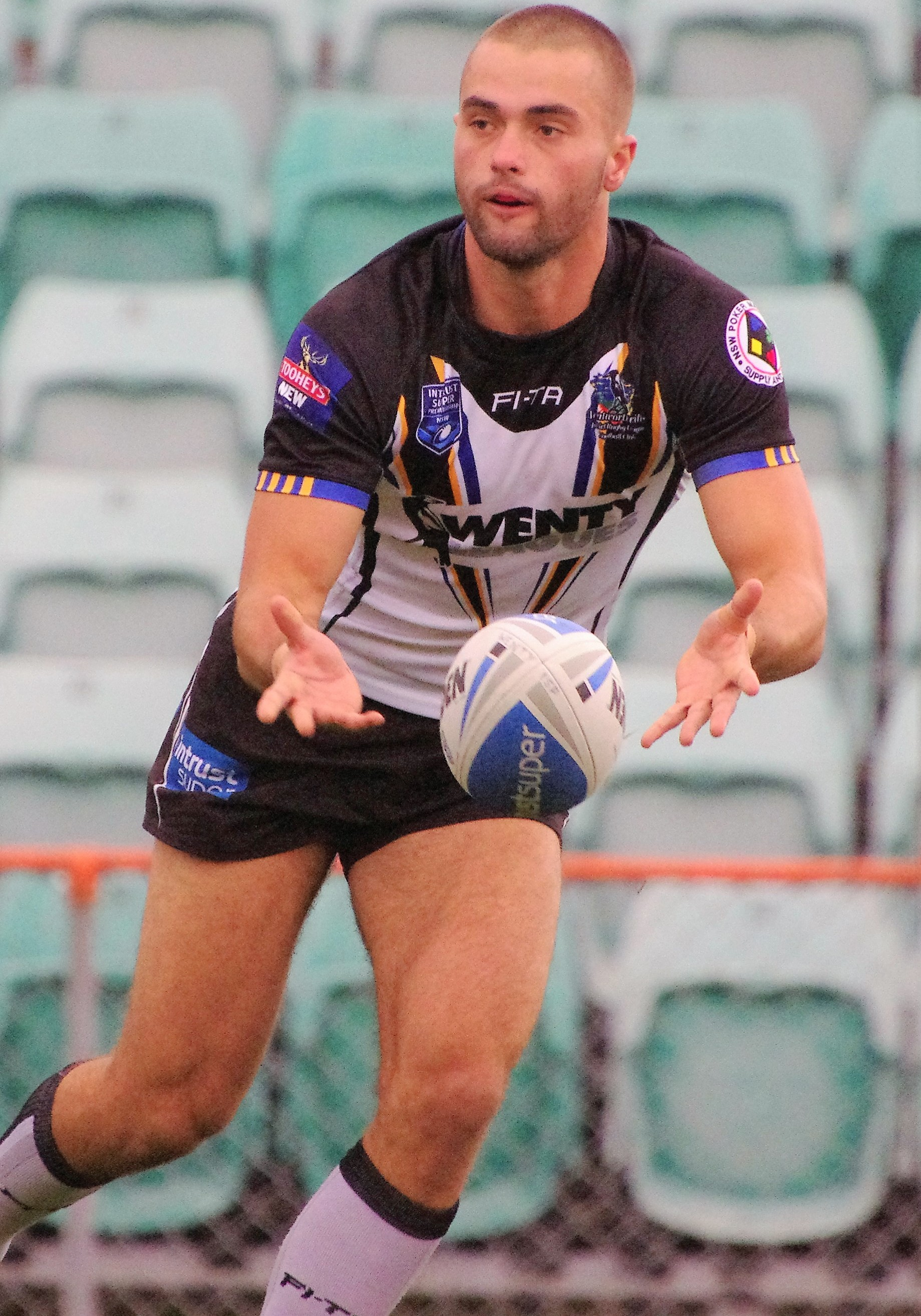
Salmon playing for the Wentworthville Magpies in 2018

On August 4, 2018 Salmon made his NRL debut in Round 21 playing of the bench against the Gold Coast Titans in a 28-12 win. In Round 22, Salmon started at five-eighth for Parramatta in a 40-4 win over the St. George Illawarra Dragons, ending the game with a try assist and line-break.

Salmon missed the opening round of the 2019 through injury. Salmon returned the side in Round 2 2019, playing from the bench as Parramatta defeated rivals Canterbury-Bankstown 36-16. After Dylan Brown was ruled out through injury, Salmon was placed in the five-eighth position by coach Brad Arthur. Salmon scored his first try for Parramatta in Round 6 2019 against Wests Tigers which was the opening NRL game to be played at the new Western Sydney Stadium with Parramatta running out winners 51-6. On 14 May 2019, Salmon was demoted to reserve grade after Parramatta were defeated by Melbourne 64-10 at Suncorp Stadium.

Following Parramatta's 44-22 loss against the Cronulla-Sutherland Sharks in Round 13, Salmon was recalled back to the starting side to replace Will Smith against Brisbane. In Round 14 against Brisbane, Salmon started at five-eighth and set up teammate Reed Mahoney for a second half try as Parramatta won the match 38-10.

Salmon spent most of the 2019 season playing for Parramatta's feeder club side the Wentworthville Magpies in the Canterbury Cup NSW competition. Salmon kicked a field goal in Wentworthville's 20-15 grand final loss against Newtown at Bankwest Stadium. Wentworthville had reached the decider after finishing in 8th position and had won 3 sudden death games in a row to make the final.

Salmon made no appearances for Parramatta in the 2020 NRL season. On 12 October 2020, he was released by Parramatta.

=== Penrith Panthers ===
On 22 December 2020, he signed a one-year deal to join Penrith for the 2021 NRL season. In round 13 of the 2021 NRL season, he made his club debut for Penrith against the Wests Tigers in a 6-26 loss. He was retained for the 2022 season and played the first nine games of the competition mostly in the back row. In round 13 of the 2022 NRL season, Salmon scored his first try for Penrith in a 30-18 victory over Canterbury. Following Penrith's round 21 victory over Canberra in the 2022 NRL season, Salmon was verbally attacked by Canberra head coach Ricky Stuart in the post match press conference. During the game, Salmon had lashed out with his boots whilst being tackled which injured Tom Starling. Stuart went on to say "I've had history with that kid. I know that kid very well. He was a weak gutted dog as a kid and he hasn't changed now. He's a weak gutted dog person now". Stuart was later suspended by the NRL for those remarks towards Salmon. Salmon played 25 games for Penrith in the 2022 NRL season with 22 of them coming from the interchange bench. Salmon played for Penrith in their 2022 NRL Grand Final victory over Parramatta. Following the game, Salmon took a picture of himself which was later uploaded to social media with the caption "Just a premiership winning weak gutted dog". The post was then subsequently deleted. On 18 February 2023, Salmon played in Penrith's 12-13 upset loss to St Helens RFC in the 2023 World Club Challenge. In round 5 of the 2023 NRL season, Salmon scored the final try in Penrith's 53-12 victory over Canberra. After scoring the try, Salmon could be seen yelling "Weak Gutted Dog" at the crowd. On 1 August 2023, Salmon signed a two-year deal to join Canterbury starting in 2024.

=== Canterbury-Bankstown Bulldogs ===
In round 1 of the 2024 NRL season, Salmon made his club debut for Canterbury as they lost 26-8 against arch-rivals Parramatta. In round 12, Salmon scored two tries for Canterbury in their 44-12 win over St. George Illawarra. Salmon played 20 games for Canterbury in the 2024 NRL season which saw the club qualify for the finals finishing 6th on the table. Salmon featured in the clubs elimination finals loss against Manly.

On 8 April 2025, the Canterbury outfit announced that Salmon had re-signed with the club until the end of 2027. In round 10 of the 2025 NRL season, Salmon scored a try in Canterbury's 30-22 comeback victory over Canberra. After Salmon scored the try, he was seen on television cameras yelling the words "weak gutted dog" in reference to comments Canberra's head coach Ricky Stuart had made about him two years earlier. The following day, it was announced that Salmon would miss at least ten weeks after suffering a fractured ankle during the game. Salmon played 20 games for Canterbury in the 2025 NRL season as the club finished fourth and qualified for the finals. Canterbury would be eliminated from the finals in straight sets. Salmon played every game for Canterbury in the 2026 NRL season as the club finished 12th and missed the finals.

== Statistics ==
Year	Team	Games	Tries	Pts
2018	Parramatta Eels	5		
2019	Parramatta Eels	12	1	4
2021	Penrith Panthers	2		
2022	Penrith Panthers	25	2	8
2023	Penrith Panthers	17	4	16
2024	Canterbury-Bankstown Bulldogs	20	3	12
2025	Canterbury-Bankstown Bulldogs	20	2	8
2026	Canterbury-Bankstown Bulldogs	22	3	12
	Totals	123	15	60

== Personal life ==
On October 14, 2018, it was reported that Salmon had crashed his white Jeep Cherokee into 3 parked cars before rolling onto its roof, stopping southbound traffic in Miranda in Sydney's south. Salmon was taken to hospital for mandatory blood and urine testing before being released.

On 5 December 2018, Salmon was charged with low range drink driving for the incident which occurred in October 2018. Salmon was ordered to complete a safe driving course and faced court in January 2019.

On 17 January 2019, Salmon was fined $1500 and disqualified from driving for 6 months at Sutherland Local Court. The court heard Salmon was checking his phone when his Jeep Cherokee crossed onto the wrong side of the road, hit three parked cars before flipping onto its roof stopping traffic. The court also heard Salmon had been out clubbing in Cronulla and arrived on home at 3am, slept for 6 hours before waking at 9am to get breakfast and then buy a suit from Westfield Miranda when the crash occurred.
