= Lachlan Galvin =

Australian rugby league footballer

Personal information
- Full name: Lachlan James Galvin
- Born: 14 July 2005 (age 21) Campbelltown, New South Wales, Australia
- Height: 190 cm (6 ft 3 in)
- Weight: 85 kg (13 st 5 lb)

Playing information
- Position: Halfback, Five-eighth
Club
Years	Team	Pld	T	G	FG	P
2024–25	Wests Tigers	31	5	0	0	20
2025–	Canterbury Bulldogs	38	14	0	0	56
	Total	69	19	0	0	76
Representative
Years	Team	Pld	T	G	FG	P
2024–26	Prime Minister's XIII	2	0	0	0	0
- Source: As of 22 November 2026

Lachlan James Galvin (born 14 July 2005) is an Australian professional rugby league footballer who plays as a halfback for the Canterbury-Bankstown Bulldogs in the National Rugby League (NRL).

He has played at representative level for the Prime Minister's XIII in 2024. Galvin previously played for the Wests Tigers in the NRL as a five-eighth.

== Background ==
Galvin spent his high school years at Westfields Sports High School. He had also represented and captained the Australian Schoolboys in 2023 playing five-eighth.

Galvin supported the Parramatta Eels growing up, but played his junior rugby league initially for Eaglevale-St Andrews Magpies in the Western Suburbs junior district. Galvin was later picked up by the Eels in his teens, and played a couple of seasons in Harold Matthews before he was cut loose.

"I wasn't really getting game time, and they kind of told (that there is) probably not going to be a spot here for ya in the long-term". Galvin would later join the Wests Tigers junior set up for a $5000 transfer fee. Galvin would then play for Western Suburbs. In 2022, he was part of the Western Suburbs team which won the Harold Matthews competition that season.

== Playing career ==
In round 2 of the 2024 NRL season, Galvin made his first grade debut for the Wests Tigers in their 32-12 loss against Canberra. During Wests Tigers upset victory over Parramatta in round 4, Galvin was sent to the sin bin and placed on report for a hip drop tackle. He was later suspended for two games. On 10 June 2024, it was reported that Galvin had requested a release from his contract with the Wests Tigers following the club's 56-14 loss against St. George Illawarra. In round 16, Galvin scored two tries for the Wests Tigers in their 48-24 victory over Canberra. Galvin played 21 times for the Wests Tigers in his debut season as the club finished with the wooden spoon for a third straight season.

=== 2025 ===
On 14 April, the Tigers announced that Galvin would be leaving the team at the end of the 2026 season after he rejected a contract extension. It was later revealed that Galvin's exit was due to having "no faith" in coach Benji Marshall, and the fact Galvin was annoyed having to play "second fiddle" to four-time premiership playmaker Jarome Luai. Galvin was later dropped from the round 7 team list. Galvin was recalled to the Wests Tigers team for their round 8 match against Cronulla where they would win 20-18 at Leichhardt Oval.

The Tigers subsequently gave Galvin permission to negotiate immediately with other clubs, subject to a transfer fee of $165,000. In May he was set to sign with Canterbury.

On 30 May, the Wests Tigers confirmed that Galvin had been released immediately from his contract. Hours later, Canterbury announced that they had signed Galvin effective immediately until the end of the 2028 NRL season.

Galvin made his debut for Canterbury against arch-rivals Parramatta in round 14. He came on as a substitute in the 57th minute and scored the last try of the match. Galvin played 14 games for Canterbury in the 2025 NRL season as the club finished third and qualified for the finals. Canterbury would be eliminated from the finals in straight sets.

=== 2026 ===
Galvin played every match for Canterbury in the 2026 NRL season as the club finished 12th on the table.

He played for the Prime Minister's XIII on 3 October 2026 in the 10-60 win over PNG Prime Minister's XIII in Port Moresby.

== Statistics ==
Year	Team	Games	Tries	Pts
2024	Wests Tigers	21	4	16
2025	Wests Tigers	10	1	4
2025	Canterbury-Bankstown Bulldogs	14	4	16
2026	Canterbury-Bankstown Bulldogs	24	10	40
2027	Canterbury-Bankstown Bulldogs			
	Totals	69	19	76
