= 2027 NRL season =

Australian rugby league season

2027 National Rugby League
- Duration: 27 February (Note: Local time in Las Vegas.) – 3 October 2027
- Teams: 18

The 2027 NRL season will be the 120th season of professional rugby league in Australia and the 30th season run by the National Rugby League (NRL). The regular season will be followed by a finals series contested by the top eight teams on the competition ladder.

== Teams ==
For the 2027 season, the number of teams in the NRL will increase from seventeen to eighteen with the inclusion of the Perth Bears (supported by the Western Australian Government), the first professional rugby league team based in Western Australia since the Perth Reds played their final season in 1997. The new club is also a strategic partnership with the North Sydney Bears, who last fielded an NRL team in 1999. With their inclusion, there are ten teams from New South Wales, four from Queensland, and one from each of Victoria, Western Australia, the Australian Capital Territory, and New Zealand.

Club	Season	Home ground(s)	Head coach	Captain(s)
Brisbane Broncos	40th season	Suncorp Stadium	Michael Maguire	TBA
Canberra Raiders	46th season	GIO Stadium	Ricky Stuart	Joseph Tapine
Canterbury-Bankstown Bulldogs	93rd season	Accor Stadium	Cameron Ciraldo	Stephen Crichton
Cronulla-Sutherland Sharks	61st season	Ocean Protect Stadium	Craig Fitzgibbon	Blayke Brailey
Dolphins	5th season	Suncorp Stadium	Kristian Woolf	Tom Gilbert & Isaiya Katoa
Gold Coast Titans	21st season	Cbus Super Stadium	Josh Hannay	Tino Fa'asuamaleaui & Moeaki Fotuaika
Manly Warringah Sea Eagles	78th season	4 Pines Park	Kieran Foran	Jake Trbojevic & Tom Trbojevic
Melbourne Storm	30th season	AAMI Park	Craig Bellamy	Harry Grant
Newcastle Knights	40th season	McDonald Jones Stadium	Justin Holbrook	Kalyn Ponga
New Zealand Warriors	33rd season	Go Media Stadium	Andrew Webster	James Fisher-Harris
North Queensland Cowboys	33rd season	Queensland Country Bank Stadium	Todd Payten	Reuben Cotter & Tom Dearden
Parramatta Eels	81st season	CommBank Stadium	Jason Ryles	Mitchell Moses
Penrith Panthers	61st season	Helloworld Stadium	Ivan Cleary	Nathan Cleary & Isaah Yeo
Perth Bears	1st season	HBF Park	Mal Meninga	TBA
South Sydney Rabbitohs	118th season	Accor Stadium & Allianz Stadium	Wayne Bennett	Cameron Murray
St. George Illawarra Dragons	29th season	St. George Venues Jubilee Stadium & WIN Stadium	Dean Young	Clint Gutherson
Sydney Roosters	120th season	Allianz Stadium	Trent Robinson	James Tedesco
Wests Tigers	28th season	CommBank Stadium & Campbelltown Sports Stadium	Benji Marshall	Apisai Koroisau

== Venues ==
Venues for the 2026 National Rugby League competition.

New South Wales
Sydney	Parramatta	Sydney Olympic Park	Woolooware
Allianz Stadium	CommBank Stadium	Accor Stadium	Ocean Protect Stadium
Capacity: 42,500	Capacity: 30,000	Capacity: 82,000	Capacity: 15,000
Brookvale	Leumeah	Penrith	Carlton
4 Pines Park	Campbelltown Sports Stadium	Helloworld Stadium	St. George Venues Jubilee Stadium
Capacity: 18,000	Capacity: 17,500	Capacity: 25,000	Capacity: 20,500
Newcastle	Gosford	Wollongong	
McDonald Jones Stadium	polytec Stadium	WIN Stadium	
Capacity: 27,500	Capacity: 20,059	Capacity: 22,000	
Wagga Wagga	Bathurst		
Geohex Stadium	Carrington Park		
Capacity: 10,000	Capacity: 13,000		
Queensland
Brisbane	Redcliffe	Gold Coast	Townsville
Suncorp Stadium	Kayo Stadium	Cbus Super Stadium	Queensland Country Bank Stadium
Capacity: 52,500	Capacity: 10,000	Capacity: 27,690	Capacity: 25,455
Australian Capital Territory	Victoria	Western Australia	
Canberra	Melbourne	Perth	
GIO Stadium	AAMI Park	Optus Stadium	HBF Park
Capacity: 25,011	Capacity: 30,050	Capacity: 61,266	Capacity: 20,500
New Zealand
Auckland		Dunedin	Christchurch
Go Media Stadium	Eden Park	Forsyth Barr Stadium	One New Zealand Stadium
Capacity: 25,000	Capacity: 50,000	Capacity: 30,748	Capacity: 25,000
Northern Territory	United States of America		
Darwin	Paradise		
TIO Stadium	Allegiant Stadium		
Capacity: 12,215	Capacity: 65,000		

== Pre-season ==
=== Pre-season Challenge ===
An 18-game pre-season challenge will be played from 7 to 21 February 2027, before a 7 day leadup into the regular season.

== Regular season ==
=== Results ===
Team	1	2	3	4	5	6	7	8	9	10	11	12	13	14	15	16	17	18	19	20	21	22	23	24	25	26	27	F1	F2	F3	GF
Brisbane Broncos	SYD	**WTI**	**NQL**	**NEW**	GCT	DOL	**SYD**	**PAR**	X	**SOU**	PEN	NZL	**CRO**	**GCT**	X	SOU	CAN	X	**NZL**	PER	**SGI**	NQL	MEL	**PEN**	**DOL**	CBY	MAN				
Canberra Raiders	**SOU**	PER	**PEN**	**CRO**	NQL	NEW	**MEL**	GCT	SGI	**PER**	WTI	PAR	**GCT**	MEL	X	**MAN**	**BRI**	X	**SGI**	DOL	CBY	X	**NZL**	SYD	**NQL**	CRO	**WTI**				
Canterbury-Bankstown Bulldogs	NZL	PAR	GCT	**SOU**	WTI	**NQL**	DOL	**PER**	**CRO**	PEN	**NEW**	MAN	X	**SYD**	**PAR**	X	SGI	**WTI**	X	MEL	**CAN**	SOU	**PEN**	PER	SYD	**BRI**	**SGI**				
Cronulla-Sutherland Sharks	DOL	MAN	**SGI**	CAN	PEN	**WTI**	**PAR**	NZL	CAN	**GCT**	**MEL**	SOU	BRI	X	**NEW**	NQL	X	**SYD**	PEN	NEW	X	**PER**	**SOU**	SGI	MEL	**CAN**	**NZL**				
Dolphins	**CRO**	SGI	**MEL**	PEN	**SOU**	**BRI**	**CBY**	NEW	**NZL**	WTI	SYD	X	MEL	**NQL**	**MAN**	PAR	GCT	X	PER	**CBR**	MAN	**SYD**	X	NQL	BRI	**PER**	**GCT**				
Gold Coast Titans	PAR										**MAN**			BRI																	
Manly Warringah Sea Eagles	PER										GCT																				
Melbourne Storm	**WTI**										CRO																				
Newcastle Knights	**PEN**	MEL	**NZL**	BRI	MAN	**CAN**	NQL	**DOL**	**WTI**	**SYD**	CBY	X	**PAR**	WTI	CRO	X	**PER**	SOU	GCT	**CRO**	NZL	SGI	X	**GCT**	**MAN**	PAR	**NQL**				
New Zealand Warriors	**CBY**	**PEN**	NEW	NQL	**SYD**	MEL	WTI	**CRO**	DOL	X	**SGI**	**BRI**	X	PEN	SGI	**PER**	**MEL**	PAR	BRI	X	**NEW**	**MAN**	CAN	**PAR**	GCT	**SOU**	CRO				
North Queensland Cowboys	SGI	**GCT**	BRI	**NZL**	**CAN**	CBY	**NEW**	**WTI**	PER	**PAR**	SOU	X	**PEN**	DOL	X	**CRO**	WTI	**SGI**	MEL	X	GCT	**BRI**	MAN	**DOL**	CBR	**SYD**	NEW				
Parramatta Eels	**GCT**	**CBY**	SYD	WTI	**SGI**	**MAN**	CRO	BRI	**PEN**	NQL	PER	**CAN**	NEW	X	CBY	**DOL**	X	**NZL**	MAN	X	SOU	**WTI**	**SYD**	NZL	PEN	**NEW**	**MEL**				
Penrith Panthers	NEW	NZL	CAN	**DOL**	**CRO**	SYD	SGI	**MAN**	PAR	**CBY**	**BRI**	X	NQL	**NZL**	**WTI**	GCT	**SYD**	X	CRO	**SOU**	**MEL**	X	CBY	BRI	**PAR**	WTI	**PER**				
Perth Bears	**MAN**	**CAN**	WTI	SGI	**MEL**	**GCT**	MAN	CBY	**NQL**	CAN	**PAR**	**WTI**	SYD	X	**SOU**	NZL	NEW	X	**DOL**	**BRI**	X	CRO	GCT	**CBY**	**SGI**	DOL	PEN				
South Sydney Rabbitohs	CAN	**SYD**	**MAN**	CBY	DOL	**SGI**	**GCT**	MEL	X	BRI	**NQL**	**CRO**	SGI	X	PER	**BRI**	MAN	**NEW**	X	PEN	**PAR**	**CBY**	CRO	**MEL**	**WTI**	NZL	SYD				
St. George Illawarra Dragons	**NQL**	**DOL**	CRO	**PER**	PAR	SOU	**PEN**	SYD	**CAN**	**MEL**	NZL	X	**SOU**	MAN	**NZL**	X	**CBY**	NQL	CAN	X	BRI	**NEW**	WTI	**CRO**	PER	**GCT**	CBY				
Sydney Roosters	**BRI**	SOU	**PAR**	MEL	NZL	**PEN**	BRI	**SGI**	GCT	NEW	**DOL**	X	**PER**	CBY	X	**MEL**	PEN	CRO	X	**MAN**	**WTI**	DOL	PAR	**CBR**	**CBY**	NQL	**SOU**				
Wests Tigers	MEL	BRI	**PER**	**PAR**	**CBY**	CRO	**NZL**	NQL	NEW	**DOL**	**CAN**	PER	X	**NEW**	PEN	X	**NQL**	CBY	X	**GCT**	SYD	PAR	**SGI**	**MAN**	SOU	**PEN**	CAN				
Team	1	2	3	4	5	6	7	8	9	10	11	12	13	14	15	16	17	18	19	20	21	22	23	24	25	26	27	F1	F2	F3	GF

Bold – Home game
X – Bye
* – Golden point game
Opponent for round listed above margin

== Ladder ==
Pos	Team	Pld	W	D	L	B	PF	PA	PD	Pts	Qualification
1	Brisbane Broncos	0	0	0	0	0	0	0	0	0	Advance to finals series
2	Canberra Raiders	0	0	0	0	0	0	0	0	0	Advance to finals series
3	Canterbury-Bankstown Bulldogs	0	0	0	0	0	0	0	0	0	Advance to finals series
4	Cronulla-Sutherland Sharks	0	0	0	0	0	0	0	0	0	Advance to finals series
5	Dolphins	0	0	0	0	0	0	0	0	0	Advance to finals series
6	Gold Coast Titans	0	0	0	0	0	0	0	0	0	Advance to finals series
7	Manly Warringah Sea Eagles	0	0	0	0	0	0	0	0	0	Advance to finals series
8	Melbourne Storm	0	0	0	0	0	0	0	0	0	Advance to finals series
9	Newcastle Knights	0	0	0	0	0	0	0	0	0	
10	New Zealand Warriors	0	0	0	0	0	0	0	0	0	
11	North Queensland Cowboys	0	0	0	0	0	0	0	0	0	
12	Parramatta Eels	0	0	0	0	0	0	0	0	0	
13	Penrith Panthers	0	0	0	0	0	0	0	0	0	
14	Perth Bears	0	0	0	0	0	0	0	0	0	
15	South Sydney Rabbitohs	0	0	0	0	0	0	0	0	0	
16	St. George Illawarra Dragons	0	0	0	0	0	0	0	0	0	
17	Sydney Roosters	0	0	0	0	0	0	0	0	0	
18	Wests Tigers	0	0	0	0	0	0	0	0	0	

Updated to match(es) played on unknown. Source: National Rugby League

== 2027 transfers ==
Player	2026 Club	2027 Club
Grant Anderson	Brisbane Broncos	New Zealand Warriors
Jesse Arthars	Brisbane Broncos	Catalans Dragons (Super League)
Jack Gosiewski	Brisbane Broncos	TBA
Payne Haas	Brisbane Broncos	South Sydney Rabbitohs
Delouise Hoeter	Brisbane Broncos	TBA
Jaiyden Hunt	Brisbane Broncos	Canberra Raiders
Corey Jensen	Brisbane Broncos	Retirement
Adam Reynolds	Brisbane Broncos	Retirement
Gehamat Shibasaki	Brisbane Broncos	Perth Bears
Jayden Brailey	Canberra Raiders	Wests Tigers
Corey Horsburgh	Canberra Raiders	Perth Bears
Josh Papali'i	Canberra Raiders	Retirement
Morgan Smithies	Canberra Raiders	Perth Bears
Tom Starling	Canberra Raiders	St Helens (Super League)
Joshua Curran	Canterbury-Bankstown Bulldogs	Perth Bears
Lipoi Hopoi	Canterbury-Bankstown Bulldogs	Canberra Raiders
Kurt Mann	Canterbury-Bankstown Bulldogs	Wests Tigers
Marcelo Montoya	Canterbury-Bankstown Bulldogs	Retirement
Jake Turpin	Canterbury-Bankstown Bulldogs	TBA
Bronson Xerri	Canterbury-Bankstown Bulldogs	Melbourne Storm
Mawene Hiroti	Cronulla-Sutherland Sharks	Gold Coast Titans
Sione Katoa	Cronulla-Sutherland Sharks	North Queensland Cowboys
Cameron McInnes	Cronulla-Sutherland Sharks	York Knights (Super League)
Jesse Ramien	Cronulla-Sutherland Sharks	North Queensland Cowboys
Siosifa Talakai	Cronulla-Sutherland Sharks	Perth Bears
Braden Uele	Cronulla-Sutherland Sharks	Sydney Roosters
Jake Averillo	Dolphins	Wests Tigers
Jamayne Isaako	Dolphins	Melbourne Storm
Kodi Nikorima	Dolphins	St. George Illawarra Dragons
Ray Stone	Dolphins	Retirement
Jaemin Jolliffe	Gold Coast Titans	Huddersfield Giants (Super League)
Phillip Sami	Gold Coast Titans	St. George Illawarra Dragons
Sam Verrills	Gold Coast Titans	Sydney Roosters
Fletcher Baker	Manly Warringah Sea Eagles	TBA
Nathan Brown	Manly Warringah Sea Eagles	Catalans Dragons (Super League)
Zach Dockar-Clay	Manly Warringah Sea Eagles	TBA
Reuben Garrick	Manly Warringah Sea Eagles	Sydney Roosters
Aaron Schoupp	Manly Warringah Sea Eagles	TBA
Sio Siua Taukeiaho	Manly Warringah Sea Eagles	TBA
Blake Wilson	Manly Warringah Sea Eagles	Perth Bears
Shawn Blore	Melbourne Storm	Brisbane Broncos
Joe Chan	Melbourne Storm	North Queensland Cowboys
Tui Kamikamica	Melbourne Storm	Retirement
Nick Meaney	Melbourne Storm	Perth Bears
Davvy Moale	Melbourne Storm	Manly Warringah Sea Eagles
Josiah Pahulu	Melbourne Storm	Canberra Raiders
Marion Seve	Melbourne Storm	Retirement
William Warbrick	Melbourne Storm	New Zealand Warriors
Tyran Wishart	Melbourne Storm	Perth Bears
Tyson Frizell	Newcastle Knights	Wests Tigers
Dane Gagai	Newcastle Knights	Brisbane Broncos
Tyson Gamble	Newcastle Knights	Catalans Dragons (Super League)
Brodie Jones	Newcastle Knights	Retirement
James Schiller	Newcastle Knights	Parramatta Eels
Connor Votano	Newcastle Knights	Canterbury-Bankstown Bulldogs
Mitchell Barnett	New Zealand Warriors	Brisbane Broncos
Morgan Gannon	New Zealand Warriors	Leeds Rhinos (Super League)
Luke Laulilii	New Zealand Warriors	Perth Bears
Luke Metcalf	New Zealand Warriors	St. George Illawarra Dragons
Marata Niukore	New Zealand Warriors	Newcastle Knights
Adam Pompey	New Zealand Warriors	Melbourne Storm
Roger Tuivasa-Sheck	New Zealand Warriors	Wakefield Trinity (Super League)
John Bateman	North Queensland Cowboys	Bradford Bulls (Super League)
Scott Drinkwater	North Queensland Cowboys	St. George Illawarra Dragons
Wiremu Greig	North Queensland Cowboys	Leeds Rhinos (Super League)
Sam McIntyre	North Queensland Cowboys	New Zealand Warriors
Kai O'Donnell	North Queensland Cowboys	TBA
Jaxson Paulo	North Queensland Cowboys	TBA
Murray Taulagi	North Queensland Cowboys	RC Vannes (Top 14)
Viliami Vailea	North Queensland Cowboys	Hanazono Kintetsu Liners (Japan Rugby League One)
Josh Addo-Carr	Parramatta Eels	TBA
Jack de Belin	Parramatta Eels	TBA
Ryan Matterson	Parramatta Eels	Retirement
Jonah Pezet	Parramatta Eels	Brisbane Broncos
Sean Russell	Parramatta Eels	Perth Bears
Kelma Tuilagi	Parramatta Eels	Melbourne Storm
Dylan Walker	Parramatta Eels	Leeds Rhinos (Super League)
Jack Cole	Penrith Panthers	Perth Bears
Liam Henry	Penrith Panthers	Perth Bears
Freddy Lussick	Penrith Panthers	Canterbury-Bankstown Bulldogs
Jesse McLean	Penrith Panthers	Canterbury-Bankstown Bulldogs
Scott Sorensen	Penrith Panthers	Perth Bears
Jai Arrow	South Sydney Rabbitohs	Retirement
Adam Elliott	South Sydney Rabbitohs	Retirement
Thomas Fletcher	South Sydney Rabbitohs	New Zealand Warriors
Keaon Koloamatangi	South Sydney Rabbitohs	St. George Illawarra Dragons
Liam Le Blanc	South Sydney Rabbitohs	Penrith Panthers
Damien Cook	St. George Illawarra Dragons	Castleford Tigers (Super League)
Mat Feagai	St. George Illawarra Dragons	Castleford Tigers (Super League)
Josh Kerr	St. George Illawarra Dragons	Hull F.C. (Super League)
Blake Lawrie	St. George Illawarra Dragons	York Knights (Super League)
Luciano Leilua	St. George Illawarra Dragons	Catalans Dragons (Super League)
Hame Sele	St. George Illawarra Dragons	Catalans Dragons (Super League)
Tyrell Sloan	St. George Illawarra Dragons	Castleford Tigers (Super League)
Jaydn Su'A	St. George Illawarra Dragons	Parramatta Eels
Christian Tuipulotu	St. George Illawarra Dragons	St Helens (Super League)
Daly Cherry-Evans	Sydney Roosters	Hull F.C. (Super League)
Angus Crichton	Sydney Roosters	New South Wales Waratahs (Super Rugby)
Spencer Leniu	Sydney Roosters	Parramatta Eels
Mark Nawaqanitawase	Sydney Roosters	Saitama Wild Knights (Japan Rugby League One)
Fetalaiga Pauga	Sydney Roosters	Hull F.C. (Super League)
Daniel Tupou	Sydney Roosters	Retirement
Connor Watson	Sydney Roosters	St. George Illawarra Dragons
Mavrik Geyer	Wests Tigers	Perth Bears
Jarome Luai	Wests Tigers	Parramatta Eels
Heath Mason	Wests Tigers	Perth Bears
Jeral Skelton	Wests Tigers	Canterbury-Bankstown Bulldogs
Starford To'a	Wests Tigers	Manly Warringah Sea Eagles
Toby Sexton	Catalans Dragons (Super League)	Perth Bears
Taane Milne	Huddersfield Giants (Super League)	South Sydney Rabbitohs
James McDonnell	Leeds Rhinos (Super League)	Perth Bears
Harry Newman	Leeds Rhinos (Super League)	Perth Bears
Mikołaj Olędzki	Leeds Rhinos (Super League)	Perth Bears
Owen Trout	Leigh Leopards (Super League)	Cronulla-Sutherland Sharks
Tyson Smoothy	Wakefield Trinity (Super League)	Perth Bears
George Williams	Warrington Wolves (Super League)	Dolphins
Iszac Fa'asuamaleaui	Ipswich Jets (QLD Cup)	Perth Bears
Bailey Biondi-Odo	Townsville Blackhawks (QLD Cup)	New Zealand Warriors
Emarly Bitungane	London Broncos (RFL Championship)	Perth Bears
Luke Smith	London Broncos (RFL Championship)	Perth Bears

=== Off Contract ===
Player	2026 Club
Samuel Hughes	Canterbury-Bankstown Bulldogs
Toby Rudolf	Cronulla-Sutherland Sharks
Will Penisini	Parramatta Eels
Tom Ale	Penrith Panthers
Tony Sukkar	Wests Tigers
