= 2027 NRL Pre-season Challenge =

- Duration: 7 – 21 February 2027
- Teams: 18
- Premiers: TBD (TBD title)
- Matches played: 18
- Points scored: TBD

The 2027 NRL Pre-season Challenge of the National Rugby League is scheduled to be played from 7 to 21 February 2027, one week before the start of the 2027 NRL season.

== Standings ==
The winner of the Pre-season Challenge receives $100,000 AUD. Twelve competition points are awarded for a win and six for a draw. One bonus competition point is awarded for each of the following: 5 or more tries, 5 or more line breaks, and 10 or more offloads.

Pos	Team	Pld	W	D	L	PF	PA	PD	BP	Pts
1	Brisbane Broncos	0	0	0	0	0	0	0	0	0
2	Canberra Raiders	0	0	0	0	0	0	0	0	0
3	Canterbury-Bankstown Bulldogs	0	0	0	0	0	0	0	0	0
4	Cronulla-Sutherland Sharks	0	0	0	0	0	0	0	0	0
5	Dolphins	0	0	0	0	0	0	0	0	0
6	Gold Coast Titans	0	0	0	0	0	0	0	0	0
7	Manly Warringah Sea Eagles	0	0	0	0	0	0	0	0	0
8	Melbourne Storm	0	0	0	0	0	0	0	0	0
9	Newcastle Knights	0	0	0	0	0	0	0	0	0
10	New Zealand Warriors	0	0	0	0	0	0	0	0	0
11	North Queensland Cowboys	0	0	0	0	0	0	0	0	0
12	Parramatta Eels	0	0	0	0	0	0	0	0	0
13	Penrith Panthers	0	0	0	0	0	0	0	0	0
14	Perth Bears	0	0	0	0	0	0	0	0	0
15	South Sydney Rabbitohs	0	0	0	0	0	0	0	0	0
16	St. George Illawarra Dragons	0	0	0	0	0	0	0	0	0
17	Sydney Roosters	0	0	0	0	0	0	0	0	0
18	Wests Tigers	0	0	0	0	0	0	0	0	0

Updated to match(es) played on unknown. Source:

== Fixtures ==
=== First week ===
Saturday, 7 February	Sydney Roosters	–	Canberra Raiders	Campbelltown Sports Stadium, Sydney
14:00 AEST (UTC+10:00)		Report

Saturday, 7 February	Parramatta Eels	–	Melbourne Storm	Campbelltown Sports Stadium, Sydney
16:05 AEST (UTC+10:00)		Report

Saturday, 7 February	Wests Tigers	–	Gold Coast Titans	Campbelltown Sports Stadium, Sydney
18:15 AEST (UTC+10:00)		Report

=== Second week ===
Friday, 12 February	Sydney Roosters	–	Penrith Panthers	Polytec Stadium, Gosford
18:00 AEST (UTC+10:00)		Report

Friday, 12 February	Wests Tigers	–	St. George Illawarra Dragons	Polytec Stadium, Gosford
20:00 AEST (UTC+10:00)		Report

Saturday, 13 February	Melbourne Storm	–	Gold Coast Titans	Mars Stadium, Ballarat
14:00 AEST (UTC+10:00)		Report

Saturday, 13 February	Newcastle Knights	–	Cronulla-Sutherland Sharks	Scully Park, Tamworth
16:00 AEST (UTC+10:00)		Report

Saturday, 13 February	Brisbane Broncos	–	Canterbury-Bankstown Bulldogs	Kayo Stadium, Redcliffe
18:00 AEST (UTC+10:00)		Report

Saturday, 13 February	Dolphins	–	North Queensland Cowboys	Kayo Stadium, Redcliffe
20:00 AEST (UTC+10:00)		Report

Sunday, 14 February	South Sydney Rabbitohs	–	New Zealand Warriors	Hnry Stadium, Wellington
14:00 AEST (UTC+10:00)		Report

Sunday, 14 February	Parramatta Eels	–	Perth Bears	Eric Tweedale Stadium, Sydney
16:05 AEST (UTC+10:00)		Report

Sunday, 14 February	Canberra Raiders	–	Manly Warringah Sea Eagles	GIO Stadium, Canberra
18:15 AEST (UTC+10:00)		Report

=== Third week ===
Friday, 19 February	Dolphins	–	Newcastle Knights	Aurizon Stadium, Rockhampton
20:00 AEST (UTC+10:00)		Report

Saturday, 20 February	New Zealand Warriors	–	Penrith Panthers	FMG Stadium Waikato, Hamilton
15:00 AEST (UTC+10:00)		Report

Saturday, 20 February	Cronulla-Sutherland Sharks	–	Perth Bears	Ocean Protect Stadium, Sydney
17:30 AEST (UTC+10:00)		Report

Saturday, 20 February	St. George Illawarra Dragons	–	South Sydney Rabbitohs	Glen Willow Oval, Mudgee
19:35 AEST (UTC+10:00)		Report

Sunday, 21 February	Manly Warringah Sea Eagles	–	Canterbury-Bankstown Bulldogs	4 Pines Park, Sydney
14:00 AEST (UTC+10:00)		Report

Sunday, 21 February	North Queensland Cowboys	–	Brisbane Broncos	BB Print Stadium, Mackay
16:05 AEST (UTC+10:00)		Report

== See also ==
- 2027 NRL season
- 2027 NRL season results
