= 2027 NRL season results =

The 2027 NRL season will be the 120th of professional rugby league in Australia and the 30th season run by the National Rugby League.

All times are listed in AEST (UTC+10).

Scores with an asterisk (*) indicate golden point games.

== Regular season ==
=== Round 1 ===
28 February – 7 March

Home	Score	Away	Match information			
Home	Score	Away	Day & time	Venue	Referee	Attendance
Parramatta Eels	–	Gold Coast Titans	Sunday 28 February, 12:15 pm	Allegiant Stadium		
Melbourne Storm	–	Wests Tigers	Sunday 28 February, 2:30 pm	Allegiant Stadium		
Sydney Roosters	–	Brisbane Broncos	Thursday 4 March, 7:00 pm	Allianz Stadium		
New Zealand Warriors	–	Canterbury-Bankstown Bulldogs	Friday 5 March, 5:00 pm	Go Media Stadium		
St George Illawarra Dragons	–	North Queensland Cowboys	Friday 5 March, 7:00 pm	St George Venues Jubilee Stadium		
Dolphins	–	Cronulla-Sutherland Sharks	Saturday 6 March, 4:30 pm	Kayo Stadium		
Newcastle Knights	–	Penrith Panthers	Saturday 6 March, 6:35 pm	McDonald Jones Stadium		
Perth Bears	–	Manly-Warringah Sea Eagles	Sunday 7 March, 3:05 pm	Optus Stadium		
Canberra Raiders	–	South Sydney Rabbitohs	Sunday 7 March, 5:15 pm	GIO Stadium		

- For a fourth consecutive season, the NRL season commenced with a split round, beginning with a double-header at Allegiant Stadium in Las Vegas, Nevada, as part of NRL's Rugby League Las Vegas venture.

=== Round 2 ===
11–14 March

Home	Score	Away	Match information			
Home	Score	Away	Day & time	Venue	Referee	Attendance
Parramatta Eels	–	Canterbury-Bankstown Bulldogs	Thursday, 7:00 pm	CommBank Stadium		
St. George Illawarra Dragons	–	Dolphins	Friday, 5:00 pm	WIN Stadium		
South Sydney Rabbitohs	–	Sydney Roosters	Friday, 7:00 pm	Allianz Stadium		
Melbourne Storm	–	Newcastle Knights	Saturday, 2:00 pm	AAMI Park		
Perth Bears	–	Canberra Raiders	Saturday, 4:30 pm	HBF Park		
Brisbane Broncos	–	Wests Tigers	Saturday, 6:35 pm	Suncorp Stadium		
Manly Warringah Sea Eagles	–	Cronulla-Sutherland Sharks	Sunday, 1:00 pm	4 Pines Park		
New Zealand Warriors	–	Penrith Panthers	Sunday, 3:05 pm	Go Media Stadium		
North Queensland Cowboys	–	Gold Coast Titans	Sunday, 5:15 pm	Queensland Country Bank Stadium		

=== Round 3 ===
18–21 March

Home	Score	Away	Match information			
Home	Score	Away	Day & time	Venue	Referee	Attendance
Dolphins	–	Melbourne Storm	Thursday, 7:00 pm	Suncorp Stadium		
Sydney Roosters	–	Parramatta Eels	Friday, 5:00 pm	Allianz Stadium		
Brisbane Broncos	–	North Queensland Cowboys	Friday, 7:00 pm	Suncorp Stadium		
South Sydney Rabbitohs	–	Manly Warringah Sea Eagles	Saturday, 2:00 pm	Allianz Stadium		
Gold Coast Titans	–	Canterbury-Bankstown Bulldogs	Saturday, 4:30 pm	Cbus Super Stadium		
Canberra Raiders	–	Penrith Panthers	Saturday, 6:35 pm	GIO Stadium		
Newcastle Knights	–	New Zealand Warriors	Sunday, 1:00 pm	McDonald Jones Stadium		
Cronulla-Sutherland Sharks	–	St. George Illawarra Dragons	Sunday, 3:05 pm	Ocean Protect Stadium		
Wests Tigers	–	Perth Bears	Sunday, 5:15 pm	Campbelltown Sports Stadium		

=== Round 4 (Easter Round) ===
25–29 March

Home	Score	Away	Match information			
Home	Score	Away	Day & time	Venue	Referee	Attendance
Melbourne Storm	–	Sydney Roosters	Thursday, 7:00 pm	AAMI Park		
Canterbury-Bankstown Bulldogs	–	South Sydney Rabbitohs	Friday, 3:05 pm	Accor Stadium		
Manly Warringah Sea Eagles	–	Gold Coast Titans	Friday, 5:00 pm	4 Pines Park		
Penrith Panthers	–	Dolphins	Friday, 7:00 pm	Helloworld Stadium		
North Queensland Cowboys	–	New Zealand Warriors	Saturday, 4:30 pm	Queensland Country Bank Stadium		
Brisbane Broncos	–	Newcastle Knights	Saturday, 6:35 pm	Suncorp Stadium		
St. George Illawarra Dragons	–	Perth Bears	Sunday, 3:05 pm	St. George Venues Jubilee Stadium		
Canberra Raiders	–	Cronulla-Sutherland Sharks	Sunday, 5:15 pm	GIO Stadium		
Wests Tigers	–	Parramatta Eels	Monday, 3:05 pm	CommBank Stadium		

=== Round 5 ===
1–4 April

Home	Score	Away	Match information			
Home	Score	Away	Day & time	Venue	Referee	Attendance
Manly Warringah Sea Eagles	–	Newcastle Knights	Thursday, 7:00 pm	4 Pines Park		
New Zealand Warriors	–	Sydney Roosters	Friday, 5:00 pm	Go Media Stadium		
Dolphins	–	South Sydney Rabbitohs	Friday, 7:00 pm	Suncorp Stadium		
Penrith Panthers	–	Cronulla-Sutherland Sharks	Saturday, 2:00 pm	Carrington Park		
Wests Tigers	–	Canterbury-Bankstown Bulldogs	Saturday, 4:30 pm	Campbelltown Sports Stadium		
Gold Coast Titans	–	Brisbane Broncos	Saturday, 6:35 pm	Cbus Super Stadium		
Perth Bears	–	Melbourne Storm	Sunday, 2:00 pm	HBF Park		
Parramatta Eels	–	St. George Illawarra Dragons	Sunday, 4:05 pm	CommBank Stadium		
North Queensland Cowboys	–	Canberra Raiders	Sunday, 6:15 pm	Queensland Country Bank Stadium		

=== Round 6 ===
8–11 April

Home	Score	Away	Match information			
Home	Score	Away	Day & time	Venue	Referee	Attendance
Sydney Roosters	–	Penrith Panthers	Thursday, 7:50 pm	Allianz Stadium		
Newcastle Knights	–	Canberra Raiders	Friday, 6:00 pm	McDonald Jones Stadium		
Dolphins	–	Brisbane Broncos	Friday, 8:00 pm	Suncorp Stadium		
Cronulla-Sutherland Sharks	–	Wests Tigers	Saturday, 3:00 pm	Ocean Protect Stadium		
South Sydney Rabbitohs	–	St. George Illawarra Dragons	Saturday, 5:30 pm	Allianz Stadium		
Canterbury-Bankstown Bulldogs	–	North Queensland Cowboys	Saturday, 7:35 pm	Accor Stadium		
Melbourne Storm	–	New Zealand Warriors	Sunday, 2:00 pm	AAMI Park		
Parramatta Eels	–	Manly Warringah Sea Eagles	Sunday, 4:05 pm	CommBank Stadium		
Perth Bears	–	Gold Coast Titans	Sunday, 6:15 pm	HBF Park		

=== Round 7 ===
15–18 April

Home	Score	Away	Match information			
Home	Score	Away	Day & time	Venue	Referee	Attendance
Brisbane Broncos	–	Sydney Roosters	Thursday, 7:50 pm	Suncorp Stadium		
North Queensland Cowboys	–	Newcastle Knights	Friday, 6:00 pm	Queensland Country Bank Stadium		
Dolphins	–	Canterbury-Bankstown Bulldogs	Friday, 8:00 pm	TIO Stadium		
Cronulla-Sutherland Sharks	–	Parramatta Eels	Saturday, 3:00 pm	Ocean Protect Stadium		
South Sydney Rabbitohs	–	Gold Coast Titans	Saturday, 5:30 pm	Accor Stadium		
Canberra Raiders	–	Melbourne Storm	Saturday, 7:35 pm	GIO Stadium		
Wests Tigers	–	New Zealand Warriors	Sunday, 2:00 pm	Forsyth Barr Stadium		
Manly Warringah Sea Eagles	–	Perth Bears	Sunday, 4:05 pm	4 Pines Park		
St. George Illawarra Dragons	–	Penrith Panthers	Sunday, 6:15 pm	WIN Stadium		

=== Round 8 (ANZAC Round) ===
22–26 April

Home	Score	Away	Match information			
Home	Score	Away	Day & time	Venue	Referee	Attendance
Newcastle Knights	–	Dolphins	Thursday, 7:50 pm	McDonald Jones Stadium		
Gold Coast Titans	–	Canberra Raiders	Friday, 6:00 pm	Cbus Super Stadium		
Brisbane Broncos	–	Parramatta Eels	Friday, 8:00 pm	Suncorp Stadium		
North Queensland Cowboys	–	Wests Tigers	Saturday, 5:30 pm	Queensland Country Bank Stadium		
Penrith Panthers	–	Manly Warringah Sea Eagles	Saturday, 7:35 pm	Helloworld Stadium		
New Zealand Warriors	–	Cronulla-Sutherland Sharks	Sunday, 2:00 pm	Eden Park		
Sydney Roosters	–	St. George Illawarra Dragons	Sunday, 4:05 pm	Allianz Stadium		
Melbourne Storm	–	South Sydney Rabbitohs	Sunday, 6:15 pm	AAMI Park		
Canterbury-Bankstown Bulldogs	–	Perth Bears	Monday, 4:05pm	Accor Stadium		

=== Round 9 ===
26 April – 2 May

Home	Score	Away	Match information			
Home	Score	Away	Day & time	Venue	Referee	Attendance
Newcastle Knights	–	Wests Tigers	Friday, 6:00 pm	McDonald Jones Stadium		
Parramatta Eels	–	Penrith Panthers	Friday, 8:00 pm	CommBank Stadium		
St. George Illawarra Dragons	–	Canberra Raiders	Saturday, 3:00 pm	WIN Stadium		
Gold Coast Titans	–	Sydney Roosters	Saturday, 5:30 pm	Cbus Super Stadium		
Canterbury-Bankstown Bulldogs	–	Cronulla-Sutherland Sharks	Saturday, 7:35 pm	Accor Stadium		
Melbourne Storm	–	Manly Warringah Sea Eagles	Sunday, 2:00 pm	AAMI Park		
Dolphins	–	New Zealand Warriors	Sunday, 4:05 pm	Suncorp Stadium		
Perth Bears	–	North Queensland Cowboys	Sunday, 6:15 pm	HBF Park		
Bye: Brisbane Broncos, South Sydney Rabbitohs

=== Round 10 ===
6–9 May

Home	Score	Away	Match information			
Home	Score	Away	Day & time	Venue	Referee	Attendance
Brisbane Broncos	–	South Sydney Rabbitohs	Thursday, 7:50 pm	Suncorp Stadium		
Cronulla-Sutherland Sharks	–	Gold Coast Titans	Friday, 6:00 pm	Ocean Protect Stadium		
Penrith Panthers	–	Canterbury-Bankstown Bulldogs	Friday, 8:00 pm	Helloworld Stadium		
Canberra Raiders	–	Perth Bears	Saturday, 3:00 pm	GIO Stadium		
Wests Tigers	–	Dolphins	Saturday, 5:30 pm	Campbelltown Sports Stadium		
Newcastle Knights	–	Sydney Roosters	Saturday, 7:35 pm	McDonald Jones Stadium		
North Queensland Cowboys	–	Parramatta Eels	Sunday, 2:00 pm	Queensland Country Bank Stadium		
St. George Illawarra Dragons	–	Melbourne Storm	Sunday, 4:05 pm	WIN Stadium		
Bye: Manly Warringah Sea Eagles, New Zealand Warriors

=== Round 11 (Magic Round) ===
13–16 May

Home	Score	Away	Match information			
Home	Score	Away	Day & time	Venue	Referee	Attendance
Penrith Panthers	–	Brisbane Broncos	Thursday, 7:50 pm	Suncorp Stadium		
Wests Tigers	–	Canberra Raiders	Friday, 6:00 pm	Suncorp Stadium		
Sydney Roosters	–	Dolphins	Friday, 8:00 pm	Suncorp Stadium		
Perth Bears	–	Parramatta Eels	Saturday, 3:00 pm	Suncorp Stadium		
South Sydney Rabbitohs	–	North Queensland Cowboys	Saturday, 5:30 pm	Suncorp Stadium		
Cronulla-Sutherland Sharks	–	Melbourne Storm	Saturday, 7:35 pm	Suncorp Stadium		
Gold Coast Titans	–	Manly Warringah Sea Eagles	Sunday, 2:00 pm	Suncorp Stadium		
New Zealand Warriors	–	St. George Illawarra Dragons	Sunday, 4:05 pm	Suncorp Stadium		
Canterbury-Bankstown Bulldogs	–	Newcastle Knights	Sunday, 6:15 pm	Suncorp Stadium		

=== Round 12 ===
20–23 May

Home	Score	Away	Match information			
Home	Score	Away	Day & time	Venue	Referee	Attendance
Parramatta Eels	–	Canberra Raiders	Thursday, 7:50 pm	CommBank Stadium		
Perth Bears	–	Wests Tigers	Friday, 8:00	HBF Park		
South Sydney Rabbitohs	–	Cronulla-Sutherland Sharks	Saturday, 5:30 pm	Accor Stadium		
Manly Warringah Sea Eagles	–	Canterbury-Bankstown Bulldogs	Saturday, 7:35 pm	4 Pines Park		
New Zealand Warriors	–	Brisbane Broncos	Sunday, 4:05 pm	Go Media Stadium		
Bye: Dolphins, Gold Coast Titans, Melbourne Storm, Newcastle Knights, North Queensland Cowboys, Penrith Panthers, St. George Illawarra Dragons, Sydney Roosters

=== Round 13 ===
27–30 May

Home	Score	Away	Match information			
Home	Score	Away	Day & time	Venue	Referee	Attendance
Newcastle Knights	–	Parramatta Eels	Friday, 8:00 pm	McDonald Jones Stadium		
Canberra Raiders	–	Gold Coast Titans	Saturday, 3:00 pm	Geohex Park		
St. George Illawarra Dragons	–	South Sydney Rabbitohs	Saturday, 5:30 pm	Allianz Stadium		
North Queensland Cowboys	–	Penrith Panthers	Saturday, 7:35 pm	Queensland Country Bank Stadium		
Sydney Roosters	–	Perth Bears	Sunday, 2:00 pm	Polytec Stadium		
Melbourne Storm	–	Dolphins	Sunday, 4:05 pm	AAMI Park		
Brisbane Broncos	–	Cronulla-Sutherland Sharks	Sunday, 6:15 pm	Suncorp Stadium		
Bye: Canterbury-Bankstown Bulldogs, Manly Warringah Sea Eagles, New Zealand Warriors, Wests Tigers

=== Round 14 (Queensland Round) ===
3–6 June

Home	Score	Away	Match information			
Home	Score	Away	Day & time	Venue	Referee	Attendance
Wests Tigers	–	Newcastle Knights	Thursday, 7:50 pm	CommBank Stadium		
Manly Warringah Sea Eagles	–	St. George Illawarra Dragons	Friday, 6:00 pm	4 Pines Park		
Canterbury-Bankstown Bulldogs	–	Sydney Roosters	Friday, 8:00 pm	Accor Stadium		
Penrith Panthers	–	New Zealand Warriors	Saturday, 5:30 pm	Helloworld Stadium		
Brisbane Broncos	–	Gold Coast Titans	Saturday, 7:35 pm	Suncorp Stadium		
Melbourne Storm	–	Canberra Raiders	Sunday, 2:00 pm	AAMI Park		
Dolphins	–	North Queensland Cowboys	Sunday, 4:05 pm	Suncorp Stadium		
Bye: Cronulla-Sutherland Sharks, Parramatta Eels, Perth Bears, South Sydney Rabbitohs

=== Round 15 ===
10–14 June

Home	Score	Away	Match information			
Home	Score	Away	Day & time	Venue	Referee	Attendance
Perth Bears	–	South Sydney Rabbitohs	Thursday, 7:50 pm	HBF Park		
Dolphins	–	Manly Warringah Sea Eagles	Friday, 8:00 pm	Suncorp Stadium		
Cronulla-Sutherland Sharks	–	Newcastle Knights	Saturday, 5:30 pm	Ocean Protect Stadium		
Penrith Panthers	–	Wests Tigers	Saturday, 7:35 pm	Helloworld Stadium		
St. George Illawarra Dragons	–	New Zealand Warriors	Sunday, 4:05pm	Eden Park		
Canterbury-Bankstown Bulldogs	–	Parramatta Eels	Monday, 4:05 pm	Accor Stadium		
Bye: Brisbane Broncos, Canberra Raiders, Gold Coast Titans, Melbourne Storm, North Queensland Cowboys, Sydney Roosters
Note: This round precedes the second State of Origin match at Eden Park on Wednesday, 16 June. Source:

=== Round 16 ===
17–20 June

Home	Score	Away	Match information			
Home	Score	Away	Day & time	Venue	Referee	Attendance
Canberra Raiders	–	Manly Warringah Sea Eagles	Friday, 8:00 pm	GIO Stadium		
New Zealand Warriors	–	Perth Bears	Saturday, 3:00 pm	Go Media Stadium		
North Queensland Cowboys	–	Cronulla-Sutherland Sharks	Saturday, 5:30 pm	Queensland Country Bank Stadium		
Sydney Roosters	–	Melbourne Storm	Saturday, 7:35 pm	Allianz Stadium		
Gold Coast Titans	–	Penrith Panthers	Sunday, 2:00 pm	Cbus Super Stadium		
South Sydney Rabbitohs	–	Brisbane Broncos	Sunday, 4:05 pm	Accor Stadium		
Parramatta Eels	–	Dolphins	Sunday, 6:15 pm	CommBank Stadium		
Bye: Canterbury-Bankstown Bulldogs, Newcastle Knights, St. George Illawarra Dragons, Wests Tigers

=== Round 17 ===
24–27 June

Home	Score	Away	Match information			
Home	Score	Away	Day & time	Venue	Referee	Attendance
Newcastle Knights	–	Perth Bears	Thursday, 7:50 pm	McDonald Jones Stadium		
New Zealand Warriors	–	Melbourne Storm	Friday, 6:00 pm	Go Media Stadium		
Wests Tigers	–	North Queensland Cowboys	Friday, 8:00 pm	Campbelltown Sports Stadium		
Gold Coast Titans	–	Dolphins	Saturday, 3:00 pm	Cbus Super Stadium		
St. George Illawarra Dragons	–	Canterbury-Bankstown Bulldogs	Saturday, 5:30 pm	St. George Venues Jubilee Stadium		
Manly Warringah Sea Eagles	–	South Sydney Rabbitohs	Saturday, 7:35 pm	4 Pines Park		
Canberra Raiders	–	Brisbane Broncos	Sunday, 2:00 pm	GIO Stadium		
Penrith Panthers	–	Sydney Roosters	Sunday, 4:05 pm	Helloworld Stadium		
Bye: Cronulla-Sutherland Sharks, Parramatta Eels

=== Round 18 ===
1–4 July

Home	Score	Away	Match information			
Home	Score	Away	Day & time	Venue	Referee	Attendance
Parramatta Eels	–	New Zealand Warriors	Friday, 6:00 pm	CommBank Stadium		
South Sydney Rabbitohs	–	Newcastle Knights	Friday, 8:00 pm	Accor Stadium		
Cronulla-Sutherland Sharks	–	Sydney Roosters	Saturday, 5:30 pm	Ocean Protect Stadium		
North Queensland Cowboys	–	St. George Illawarra Dragons	Saturday, 7:35 pm	Queensland Country Bank Stadium		
Canterbury-Bankstown Bulldogs	–	Wests Tigers	Sunday, 4:05 pm	Accor Stadium		
Bye: Brisbane Broncos, Canberra Raiders, Dolphins, Gold Coast Titans, Manly Warringah Sea Eagles, Melbourne Storm, Penrith Panthers, Perth Bears

=== Round 19 ===
8–11 July

Home	Score	Away	Match information			
Home	Score	Away	Day & time	Venue	Referee	Attendance
Melbourne Storm	–	North Queensland Cowboys	Friday, 8:00 pm	AAMI Park		
Canberra Raiders	–	St. George Illawarra Dragons	Saturday, 3:00 pm	GIO Stadium		
Cronulla-Sutherland Sharks	–	Penrith Panthers	Saturday, 5:30 pm	Ocean Protect Stadium		
Brisbane Broncos	–	New Zealand Warriors	Saturday, 7:35 pm	Suncorp Stadium		
Gold Coast Titans	–	Newcastle Knights	Sunday, 2:00 pm	Cbus Super Stadium		
Manly Warringah Sea Eagles	–	Parramatta Eels	Sunday, 4:05 pm	4 Pines Park		
Perth Bears	–	Dolphins	Sunday, 6:15 pm	HBF Park		
Bye: Canterbury-Bankstown Bulldogs, South Sydney Rabbitohs, Sydney Roosters, Wests Tigers

=== Round 20 ===
15–18 July

Home	Score	Away	Match information			
Home	Score	Away	Day & time	Venue	Referee	Attendance
Melbourne Storm	–	Canterbury-Bankstown Bulldogs	Thursday, 7:50 pm	AAMI Park		
Penrith Panthers	–	South Sydney Rabbitohs	Friday, 8:00 pm	Helloworld Stadium		
Sydney Roosters	–	Manly Warringah Sea Eagles	Saturday, 3:00 pm	Allianz Stadium		
Dolphins	–	Canberra Raiders	Saturday, 5:30 pm	Suncorp Stadium		
Perth Bears	–	Brisbane Broncos	Saturday, 7:35 pm	HBF Park		
Wests Tigers	–	Gold Coast Titans	Sunday, 2:00 pm	Campbelltown Sports Stadium		
Newcastle Knights	–	Cronulla-Sutherland Sharks	Sunday, 4:05 pm	McDonald Jones Stadium		
Bye: New Zealand Warriors, North Queensland Cowboys, Parramatta Eels, St George Illawarra Dragons

=== Round 21 ===
22–25 July

Home	Score	Away	Match information			
Home	Score	Away	Day & time	Venue	Referee	Attendance
South Sydney Rabbitohs	–	Parramatta Eels	Thursday, 7:50 pm	Accor Stadium		
Manly Warringah Sea Eagles	–	Dolphins	Friday, 6:00 pm	One New Zealand Stadium		
Penrith Panthers	–	Melbourne Storm	Friday, 8:00 pm	Helloworld Stadium		
New Zealand Warriors	–	Newcastle Knights	Saturday, 3:00 pm	One New Zealand Stadium		
Gold Coast Titans	–	North Queensland Cowboys	Saturday, 5:30 pm	Cbus Super Stadium		
Canterbury-Bankstown Bulldogs	–	Canberra Raiders	Saturday, 7:35 pm	Accor Stadium		
Brisbane Broncos	–	St. George Illawarra Dragons	Sunday, 2:00 pm	Suncorp Stadium		
Sydney Roosters	–	Wests Tigers	Sunday, 4:05 pm	Allianz Stadium		
Bye: Cronulla-Sutherland Sharks, Perth Bears

=== Round 22 ===
29 July – 1 August

Home	Score	Away	Match information			
Home	Score	Away	Day & time	Venue	Referee	Attendance
Gold Coast Titans	–	Melbourne Storm	Thursday, 7:50 pm	Cbus Super Stadium		
New Zealand Warriors	–	Manly Warringah Sea Eagles	Friday, 6:00	Go Media Stadium		
South Sydney Rabbitohs	–	Canterbury-Bankstown Bulldogs	Friday, 8:00 pm	Accor Stadium		
Cronulla-Sutherland Sharks	–	Perth Bears	Saturday, 3:00 pm	Ocean Protect Stadium		
Dolphins	–	Sydney Roosters	Saturday, 5:30 pm	Suncorp Stadium		
North Queensland Cowboys	–	Brisbane Broncos	Saturday, 7:35 pm	Queensland Country Bank Stadium		
St. George Illawarra Dragons	–	Newcastle Knights	Sunday, 2:00 pm	WIN Stadium		
Parramatta Eels	–	Wests Tigers	Sunday, 4:05 pm	CommBank Stadium		
Bye: Canberra Raiders, Penrith Panthers

=== Round 23 ===
5–8 August

Home	Score	Away	Match information			
Home	Score	Away	Day & time	Venue	Referee	Attendance
Canterbury-Bankstown Bulldogs	–	Penrith Panthers	Thursday, 7:50 pm	Accor Stadium		
Cronulla-Sutherland Sharks	–	South Sydney Rabbitohs	Friday, 6:00 pm	Ocean Protect Stadium		
Melbourne Storm	–	Brisbane Broncos	Friday, 8:00 pm	AAMI Park		
Gold Coast Titans	–	Perth Bears	Saturday, 3:00 pm	Cbus Super Stadium		
Canberra Raiders	–	New Zealand Warriors	Saturday, 5:30 pm	GIO Stadium		
Parramatta Eels	–	Sydney Roosters	Saturday, 7:35 pm	CommBank Stadium		
Wests Tigers	–	St. George Illawarra Dragons	Sunday, 2:00 pm	CommBank Stadium		
Manly Warringah Sea Eagles	–	North Queensland Cowboys	Sunday, 4:05 pm	4 Pines Park		
Bye: Dolphins, Newcastle Knights

=== Round 24 ===
12–15 August

Home	Score	Away	Match information			
Home	Score	Away	Day & time	Venue	Referee	Attendance
South Sydney Rabbitohs	–	Melbourne Storm	Thursday, 7:50 pm	Accor Stadium		
New Zealand Warriors	–	Parramatta Eels	Friday, 6:00 pm	Go Media Stadium		
Brisbane Broncos	–	Penrith Panthers	Friday, 8:00 pm	Suncorp Stadium		
North Queensland Cowboys	–	Dolphins	Saturday, 3:00 pm	Queensland Country Bank Stadium		
Sydney Roosters	–	Canberra Raiders	Saturday, 5:30 pm	Allianz Stadium		
Perth Bears	–	Canterbury-Bankstown Bulldogs	Saturday, 7:35 pm	HBF Park		
Newcastle Knights	–	Gold Coast Titans	Sunday, 2:00 pm	McDonald Jones Stadium		
St. George Illawarra Dragons	–	Cronulla-Sutherland Sharks	Sunday, 4:05 pm	St. George Venues Jubilee Stadium		
Wests Tigers	–	Manly Warringah Sea Eagles	Sunday, 6:15 pm	Campbelltown Sports Stadium		

=== Round 25 ===
19–22 August

Home	Score	Away	Match information			
Home	Score	Away	Day & time	Venue	Referee	Attendance
Penrith Panthers	–	Parramatta Eels	Thursday, 7:50 pm	Helloworld Stadium		
Canberra Raiders	–	North Queensland Cowboys	Friday, 6:00 pm	GIO Stadium		
Sydney Roosters	–	Canterbury-Bankstown Bulldogs	Friday, 8:00 pm	Allianz Stadium		
South Sydney Rabbitohs	–	Wests Tigers	Saturday, 3:00 pm	Allianz Stadium		
Brisbane Broncos	–	Dolphins	Saturday, 5:30 pm	Suncorp Stadium		
Melbourne Storm	–	Cronulla-Sutherland Sharks	Saturday, 7:35 pm	AAMI Park		
Gold Coast Titans	–	New Zealand Warriors	Sunday, 2:00 pm	Cbus Super Stadium		
Newcastle Knights	–	Manly Warringah Sea Eagles	Sunday, 4:05 pm	McDonald Jones Stadium		
Perth Bears	–	St. George Illawarra Dragons	Sunday, 6:15 pm	HBF Park		

=== Round 26 ===
26–29 August

Home	Score	Away	Match information			
Home	Score	Away	Day & time	Venue	Referee	Attendance
Cronulla-Sutherland Sharks	–	Canberra Raiders	Thursday, 7:50 pm	Ocean Protect Stadium		
New Zealand Warriors	–	South Sydney Rabbitohs	Friday, 6:00 pm	Go Media Stadium		
Canterbury-Bankstown Bulldogs	–	Brisbane Broncos	Friday, 8:00 pm	Accor Stadium		
St. George Illawarra Dragons	–	Gold Coast Titans	Saturday, 3:00 pm	St. George Venues Jubilee Stadium		
North Queensland Cowboys	–	Sydney Roosters	Saturday, 5:30 pm	Queensland Country Bank Stadium		
Wests Tigers	–	Penrith Panthers	Saturday, 7:35 pm	CommBank Stadium		
Parramatta Eels	–	Newcastle Knights	Sunday, 2:00 pm	CommBank Stadium		
Dolphins	–	Perth Bears	Sunday, 4:05 pm	Suncorp Stadium		
Manly Warringah Sea Eagles	–	Melbourne Storm	Sunday, 6:15P pm	4 Pines Park		

=== Round 27 ===
2–5 September

Home	Score	Away	Match information			
Home	Score	Away	Day & time	Venue	Referee	Attendance
Canterbury-Bankstown Bulldogs	–	St. George Illawarra Dragons	Thursday, 7:50 pm	Accor Stadium		
Canberra Raiders	–	Wests Tigers	Friday, 6:00 pm	GIO Stadium		
Sydney Roosters	–	South Sydney Rabbitohs	Friday, 8:00 pm	Allianz Stadium		
Newcastle Knights	–	North Queensland Cowboys	Saturday, 3:00 pm	McDonald Jones Stadium		
Cronulla-Sutherland Sharks	–	New Zealand Warriors	Saturday, 5:30 pm	Ocean Protect Stadium		
Manly Warringah Sea Eagles	–	Brisbane Broncos	Saturday, 7:35 pm	4 Pines Park		
Penrith Panthers	–	Perth Bears	Sunday, 2:00 pm	Helloworld Stadium		
Parramatta Eels	–	Melbourne Storm	Sunday, 4:05 pm	CommBank Stadium		
Dolphins	–	Gold Coast Titans	Sunday, 6:15 pm	Suncorp Stadium		

== Stadiums used ==
Stadium	Games played	Teams / Events	Total attendance	Average attendance	Highest attendance
4 Pines Park	0 /11	Manly Warringah Sea Eagles			
AAMI Park	0 /11	Melbourne Storm			
Accor Stadium	0 /19	Canterbury-Bankstown Bulldogs, South Sydney Rabbitohs, Grand Final			
Allegiant Stadium	0 /2 (Note: Includes 1 double-header.)	Parramatta Eels, Melbourne Storm			
Allianz Stadium	0 /15	South Sydney Rabbitohs, St. George Illawarra Dragons, Sydney Roosters			
Campbelltown Sports Stadium	0 /6	Wests Tigers			
Carrington Park	0 /1	Penrith Panthers			
Cbus Super Stadium	0 /11	Gold Coast Titans			
CommBank Stadium	0 /15	Parramatta Eels, Wests Tigers			
Eden Park	0 /2	New Zealand Warriors, St. George Illawarra Dragons			
Forsyth Barr Stadium	0 /1	Wests Tigers			
Geohex Stadium	0 /1	Canberra Raiders			
GIO Stadium	0 /11	Canberra Raiders			
Go Media Stadium	0 /9	New Zealand Warriors			
HBF Park	0 /10	Perth Bears			
Helloworld Stadium	0 /10	Penrith Panthers			
Kayo Stadium	0 /1	Dolphins			
McDonald Jones Stadium	0 /12	Newcastle Knights			
Ocean Protect Stadium	0 /11	Cronulla-Sutherland Sharks			
One New Zealand Stadium	0 /2	Manly Warringah Sea Eagles, New Zealand Warriors			
Optus Stadium	0 /1	Perth Bears			
polytec Stadium	0 /1	Sydney Roosters			
Queensland Country Bank Stadium	0 /12	North Queensland Cowboys			
St. George Venues Jubilee Stadium	0 /5	St. George Illawarra Dragons			
Suncorp Stadium	0 /31 (Note: Includes 1 double-header & 2 triple-headers.)	Brisbane Broncos, Dolphins, Magic Round			
TIO Stadium	0 /1	Dolphins			
WIN Stadium	0 /5	St. George Illawarra Dragons			
