= Relocation of professional sports teams in Australia and New Zealand =

Relocation of professional sports teams occurs when a team owner moves a team, generally from one metropolitan area to another, but occasionally between municipalities in the same conurbation. Australia and New Zealand uses a North American-style league franchise system which means the teams are overwhelmingly privately owned and therefore favours relocation practices. Owners who move a team generally do so seeking better profits, facilities, fan support, or a combination of these.

The two major professional sporting leagues in Australia are the Australian Football League (AFL) and National Rugby League (NRL). Both competitions were originally based in one city (Melbourne and Sydney respectively) and expanded to a national level, and through that process, there have been team moves, mergers and closures in both leagues. The clubs are owned by members, not privately, but the North American franchise model exists, which means entry to the league is restricted. The hybrid model has meant that the leading promoter of moving is the league itself, trying to grow the football code by encouraging poorly performing clubs to move interstate.

== AFL ==
The AFL is the national competition in Australian rules football and grew out of the mostly suburban Melbourne based Victorian Football League competition; as a result, the member clubs have had to move to adjust to a changing national focus.

=== Major interstate moves and mergers ===
- South Melbourne Football Club: In 1982, it moved interstate to Sydney, 963 kilometres (598 mi) north and became the Sydney Swans, after having relocated all of its home games to Sydney in 1982. Despite early struggles, the club has more than tripled its membership since, and has won premierships (championships) in 2005 and 2012.
- Fitzroy Football Club: In 1996, the Melbourne-based club merged its playing operations with the interstate Brisbane Bears, a club 1,669 kilometres (1,037 mi) north of its original home, forming a new club known as the Brisbane Lions. Since the merger, the Brisbane club almost doubled its membership and won three consecutive premierships twice between 2001 and 2003, and 2024 and 2026. The Fitzroy Football Club ceased fielding a team in professional competitions, but it continues as a standalone entity based at its traditional home, and has fielded a team in the amateur Victorian Amateur Football Association (VAFA) since 2009.

=== Suburban based club joins the National competition ===
- The Port Adelaide Football Club, established in 1870, participated in the SANFL competition until 1997 when the club joined the AFL. In 1997 the Port Adelaide Magpies Football Club was formed to maintain the clubs presence in the SANFL at the request of the SANFL winning premierships in 1998 and 1999. The Port Adelaide Football Club won the 2004 AFL Premiership and maintains strong links to its community in the Port Adelaide area. It is the only suburban club to join the national AFL competition with all other additions to the expanded VFL being composite sides or newly established clubs like the Sydney Swans, the Brisbane Bears (see above), West Coast, Adelaide, Fremantle, Gold Coast and Greater Western Sydney.

=== Minor moves ===
- St Kilda Football Club - (1964) moved from the Junction Oval in St Kilda to the Moorabbin Oval in the South Eastern Melbourne suburb of Moorabbin. Two years, later they won their first and only premiership. (1993-1999) played their home games to Waverley Park in Mulgrave in Melbourne's east. St Kilda were one of the first tenants of the new Colonial Stadium in 2000, but their administration remained at Moorabbin. In late 2007, it was confirmed that the club would leave Moorabbin to set up base in Seaford, Victoria, a region (the Mornington Peninsula) where the club added many supporters. The move was completed at the start of the 2011 season. The Saints moved their training and administration back to Moorabbin Oval in 2018.
- Hawthorn Football Club – (1973) moved from suburban Hawthorn to Princes Park in Carlton, an inner Northern suburb of Melbourne, and then to Waverley Park in 1991. In 2000, the club moved its home games to the Melbourne Cricket Ground. In 2005, some years after Waverley Park's demise as an official VFL/AFL venue, the club permanently moved to Waverley, but the name of the club did not change. The Hawks bought a plot of land in the locality of Dingley and plan to move their base to there in 2020/21.
- Brisbane Bears – (1993) moved to the Brisbane Cricket Ground in Brisbane for the 1993 season and membership and attendances instantly tripled. Formed in 1986, the perhaps-incorrectly named side had initially established itself in Carrara, Queensland, a suburb of the city of Gold Coast, Queensland, some 80 kilometres (50 mi) south of the city of Brisbane.
- Collingwood Football Club – (1999) it played their last game at Victoria Park in Collingwood and moved to the larger and more central Melbourne Cricket Ground. The headquarters of the club moved to the Lexus Centre in Richmond, Victoria in 2005.
- Brisbane Lions - (2022-2023) the club is moving its headquarters 25 kilometres (16 mi) west to a new purpose built venue at The Reserve, Springfield (Brighton Homes Arena) in the City of Ipswich, while the club will still play its home matches at the Brisbane Cricket Ground, the women's AFLW club will play its home matches to the new stadium

=== Home ground-only moves ===
- Fitzroy Football Club: In 1967, the team moved its home ground from the Brunswick Street Oval in Fitzroy to Princes Park, Carlton. In 1970, the club again moved its home game to the Junction Oval in 1970, then the Whitten Oval in 1984 before eventually merging with an interstate club.
- Essendon Football Club – in 1992 moved their home ground from Windy Hill, Essendon to the larger and more central Melbourne Cricket Ground. In 2000, the club again moved home games to the Telstra Dome, though the headquarters of the club remained in Essendon. In 2013 the Bombers moved their training and administration to Tullamarine.
- Port Adelaide Football Club – in 1997, on admission to the AFL moved its home games to AAMI Stadium. The club retained its administration and training base at Alberton Oval in Port Adelaide.
- North Melbourne Football Club – in 2000 moved home ground to the Telstra Dome, but retained the Arden Street Oval in North Melbourne as official headquarters.
- Geelong Football Club – in 2000, the provincial Victorian club became the AFL's first true dual-home club, playing the larger games at the Telstra Dome 75 kilometres away in Melbourne. The club's administration remains based at Kardinia Park in Geelong.
- Footscray Football Club – in 2002 moved permanently from the Whitten Oval in Footscray to the larger and more central Telstra Dome and changed their name to the Western Bulldogs, though the club's headquarters is still in Footscray.
- Richmond Football Club – moved their home games from Punt Road Oval next door to the much larger Melbourne Cricket Ground. The club still trains and has administration quarters at the Punt Road Oval.
- Melbourne Football Club – During the re-development of their home, the Melbourne Cricket Ground, the training and administration headquarters of the club were temporarily moved to Sandringham, Victoria with the Victorian Football League affiliate, the Sandringham Football Club. The club's training headquarters are currently at the Junction Oval which proves troublesome during the summer as it is used for cricket. The club removed the problems associated with separate administration and training headquarters moved all operation to its new headquarters at a refurbished Olympic Park Stadium in 2007. The club also use Casey Fields in Cranbourne East as a training centre.
- Carlton Football Club – at the end of the 2005 season moved from Optus Oval in Carlton, to the larger and more central Telstra Dome, although retained its administration headquarters at Princes Park. The club was the last suburban based Melbourne club to leave its former home ground.

=== Secondary interstate 'homes' ===
Some Melbourne-based clubs began selling home games interstate in the late 1990s and conducting community camp clinics to build up local supporter bases.

- Western Bulldogs – Darwin, Northern Territory since 2000 (approximately 1–2 games a year). In 2007, the Bulldogs reduced their commitment to 1 game and signed a deal to also play 1 game a year in Canberra. They suspended their operations in Canberra in 2010, and stopped playing games in Darwin in 2013. They played 1 match a year in Cairns against the Gold Coast Suns from 2014 to 2018, and now play 1 game per year in Ballarat
- St Kilda Football Club – Launceston, Tasmania (approximately 2 games a year between 2002 and 2010).
- Hawthorn Football Club – Launceston, Tasmania (approximately 2 games a year between 2011 and 2015). In 2015 they increased the number of games to 4 per year.
- North Melbourne Football Club – in 1999, backed by the AFL, the club changed their trading name to the Kangaroos, and played a handful of home games interstate in Sydney. The move proved unsuccessful, and the club has since played in Canberra for several years (2002–2006) before abandoning the area for the more lucrative, and potential goldmine at the Gold Coast, Queensland (2007–2008). However, the club pulled out from moving 'home' games altogether after declining a league offer of a full move to the Gold Coast. The club then started playing two games a year in Hobart in 2013 and now play four games per year at Hobart's Bellerive Oval as of 2017
- Melbourne Football Club – a single home game a year to the Brisbane Lions at the Brisbane Cricket Ground in Queensland (2005–2007). The Demons added a single game to Gold Coast, Queensland in Queensland in 2006. In 2007, the Demons shifted its Gold Coast commitment to Canberra for a single game each year whilst also playing one game a year in Brisbane. The Demons abandoned operations in Canberra and the Gold Coast in 2011 after the addition of the Gold Coast Suns as a new AFL franchise, in 2014 the club started playing 1 game a year in Darwin and 1 game a year in Alice Springs

== A-League ==
New Zealand Knights FC, who played in Auckland, New Zealand, were dissolved and moved to Wellington in 2007, becoming Wellington Phoenix FC. During the later stages of the 2006–07 A-League season, Football Federation Australia (FFA) removed New Zealand Knights A-League licence due to the club's financial and administrative problems and poor on-field performance. After much delay, the final amount needed for the application came from Wellington property businessman Terry Serepisos in the latter stages of the bid. Serepisos, the club's majority owner and chairman, provided NZD $1,000,000 to ensure the beginnings of a new New Zealand franchise and a continuation of New Zealand's participation in the A-League. FFA finalised a three-year A-League licence to New Zealand Football who then sub-let the licence to the Wellington-based club. The new Wellington club was confirmed on 19 March 2007. The name for the new club was picked from a shortlist of six, pruned from 250 names suggested by the public, and was announced on 28 March 2007. Serepisos said of the name, that "It symbolises the fresh start, the rising from the ashes, and the incredible Wellington support that has come out".

== NRL ==
The NRL is the national competition in rugby league and was born out of the Sydney-based Australian Rugby League and New South Wales Rugby League competitions.

In 1987, the Western Suburbs Magpies agreed to move from its (inner) Western suburbs base to the outer south-western Macarthur district following a prior move west to Lidcombe Oval. In 1999, they merged with the remaining Inner Western team, the Balmain Tigers, (both teams having been established in 1908) to become Wests Tigers.

The North Sydney Bears attempted to move from their Northern Suburbs base to the swiftly growing Central Coast region just north of Sydney in 1999, however problems with construction at the proposed home ground now known as Central Coast Stadium meant that the Bears continued to play home matches in a variety of Sydney grounds before being forced into a merger with the Manly Sea Eagles as the Northern Eagles. The merged clubs played home matches at both the Central Coast and Manly's home ground of Brookvale Oval, but after the partnership collapsed, poor crowds at the former location led to a reversion to the name of Manly and games being played exclusively at Brookvale Oval. On 24 April 2025, 26 years after their ill-fated merger with Manly, the NRL agreed to a $50 million deal with the Western Australian Government to secure the 2027 return of the Bears to the competition as the Perth Bears, thereby representing a move of 3,850 kilometres (2,390 mi) to Perth.

Subsequently, one of the owners of Central Coast Stadium, John Singleton, has attempted to lure another club to play there, notably the South Sydney Rabbitohs who have experienced poor crowds at their new home ground of Stadium Australia.

The Canterbury Bulldogs were formed in 1935 and played their first season without a home ground. In 1936, they settled at Belmore Sports Ground and played home matches there until the end of the 1998 season. The Bulldogs trialled a number of alternative home grounds during the 1990s, including Concord Oval in 1994. In 1995, they changed their name to the Sydney Bulldogs and played most of the Premiership winning season at Parramatta Stadium, sharing the ground with bitter rivals, the Parramatta Eels and the also moved-and-renamed Sydney (Balmain) Tigers. They finally settled on Stadium Australia, the main stadium for the Sydney 2000 Olympic Games as their home ground, and in 2008, moved their training and administration facilities from Belmore to the Olympic Park Site, though have since re-embraced the Belmore region by returning to the name of the Canterbury-Bankstown Bulldogs and playing some of their home games at the new Belmore Sports Ground.

Other clubs have moved to new home grounds but have retained their original base.

== See also ==
- Relocation of professional sports teams in the United Kingdom
- Relocation of professional sports teams in the United States and Canada
