= Marly Bitungane =

Burundian Australian rugby league footballer (born 2002)

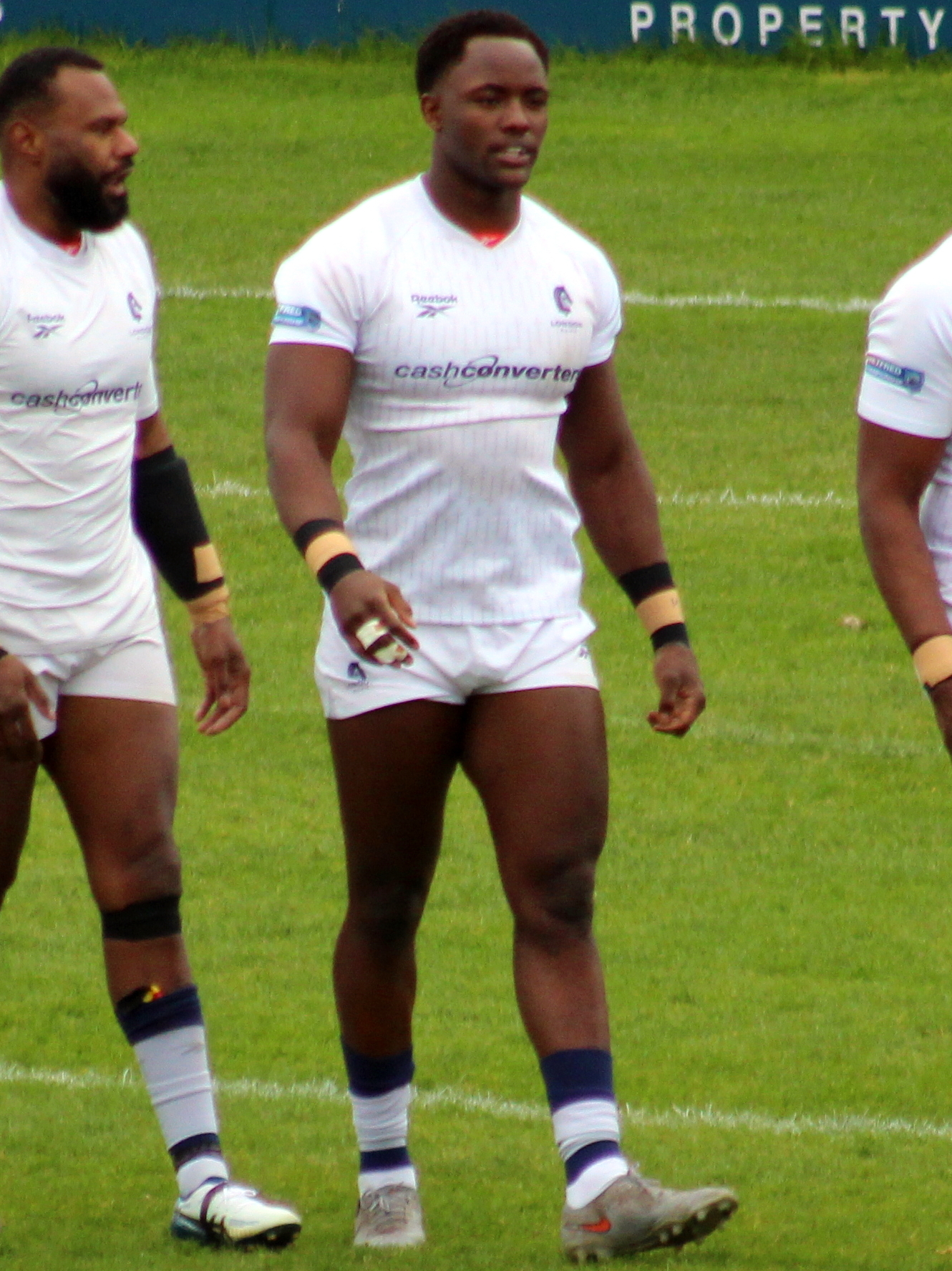

Personal information
- Full name: Emarly Bitungane
- Born: 27 October 2002 (age 24) Tanzania
- Height: 6 ft 4 in (1.93 m)
- Weight: 14 st 11 lb (94 kg)

Playing information
- Position: Loose forward, Prop
Club
Years	Team	Pld	T	G	FG	P
2025	North Qld Cowboys	2	0	0	0	0
2026	London Broncos	27	9	0	0	36
2027–	Perth Bears	0	0	0	0	0
	Total	29	9	0	0	36
- Source: As of 16 November 2026

Emarly Bitungane (born 27 October 2002) is a professional rugby league footballer who plays as a prop for the Perth Bears in the NRL.

He previously played for the North Queensland Cowboys in the National Rugby League and for the London Broncos in the Betfred Championship.

== Background ==
Bitungane was born in Tanzania to Burundian parents. In 2007 he moved to Australia, growing up in Woodridge, Queensland.

He played his junior rugby league for Logan Brothers and attended Woodridge State High School and St Joseph's College, Gregory Terrace.

== Playing career ==
=== Early career ===
In 2019 and 2020, Bitungane played for the Easts Tigers in the Mal Meninga Cup.

In 2021, after playing for the Tigers in the Hastings Deering Colts and spending a year in the Melbourne Storm's junior system, Bitungane signed with the North Queensland Cowboys, joining their Young Guns program. In 2022, he played for the Townsville Blackhawks in the Colts competition, playing in their Grand Final win over the Redcliffe Dolphins.

In 2023, Bitungane moved up to the Queensland Cup, playing nine games for Townsville. On 24 October 2023, he was upgrade to an NRL development contract with the Cowboys. In 2024, he moved to the Northern Pride, playing 19 games.

=== 2025 ===
In round 22 of the 2025 NRL season, Bitungane made his NRL debut against the Cronulla-Sutherland Sharks.

On 3 September, he was announced as one of seven players departing the North Queensland club at the end of the 2025 season.

On 7 November 2025 it was reported that he had signed for London Broncos in the RFL Championship on a 1-year deal.

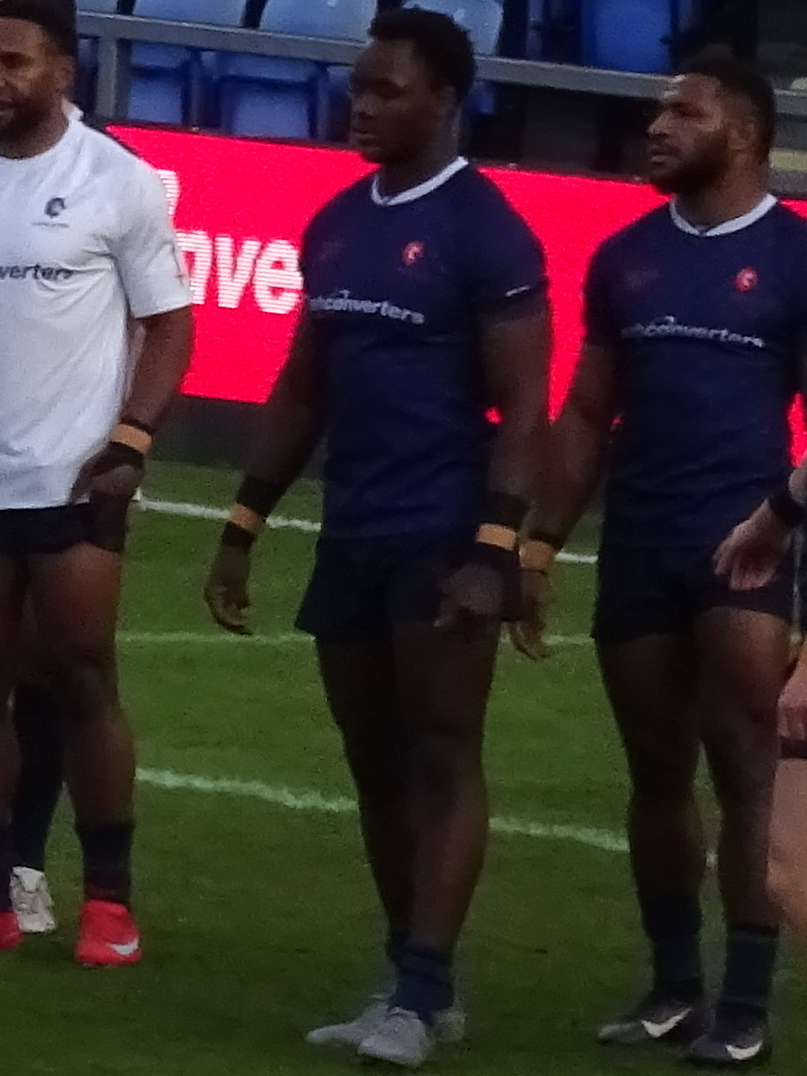
Bitungane warming up for the London Broncos in 2026

On 4 December 2025 it was reported that he had signed for Perth Bears in the NRL for the 2027 season

=== 2026 ===
In August 2026, he was part of the Broncos squad that lifted the RFL Championship Leaders' Shield.

He played in London's 1895 Cup Final victory over the Widnes Vikings at the Halliwell Jones Stadium in August 2026.

In September 2026 he was named Players Player of the Year at the clubs awards night.

In October 2026, he played in the Broncos Championship Grand Final victory over Doncaster at Plough Lane.

== Club statistics ==
Year	Club	League Competition	Appearances	Tries	Goals	Drop goals	Points	Notes
2023	North Queensland Cowboys	2023 NRL season	0	0	0	0	0	Played one pre-season game
2023	Townsville Blackhawks	2023 Queensland Cup	9	0	0	0	0	North Queensland Cowboys Affiliate club
2024	North Queensland Cowboys	2024 NRL season	0	0	0	0	0	Played one pre-season game
2024	Northern Pride	2024 Queensland Cup	19	1	0	0	4	North Queensland Cowboys Affiliate club
2025	North Queensland Cowboys	2025 NRL season	2	0	0	0	0	Played one pre-season game
2025	Northern Pride	2025 Queensland Cup	16	6	0	0	24	North Queensland Cowboys Affiliate club
2026	London Broncos	2026 RFL Championship	27	9	0	0	36	
2027	Perth Bears	2027 NRL season	0	0	0	0	0	
Club career total			73	16	0	0	64	
