= Eric Tweedale Stadium =

Stadium in Merrylands, New South Wales, Australia

- Merrylands RSL Rugby Park
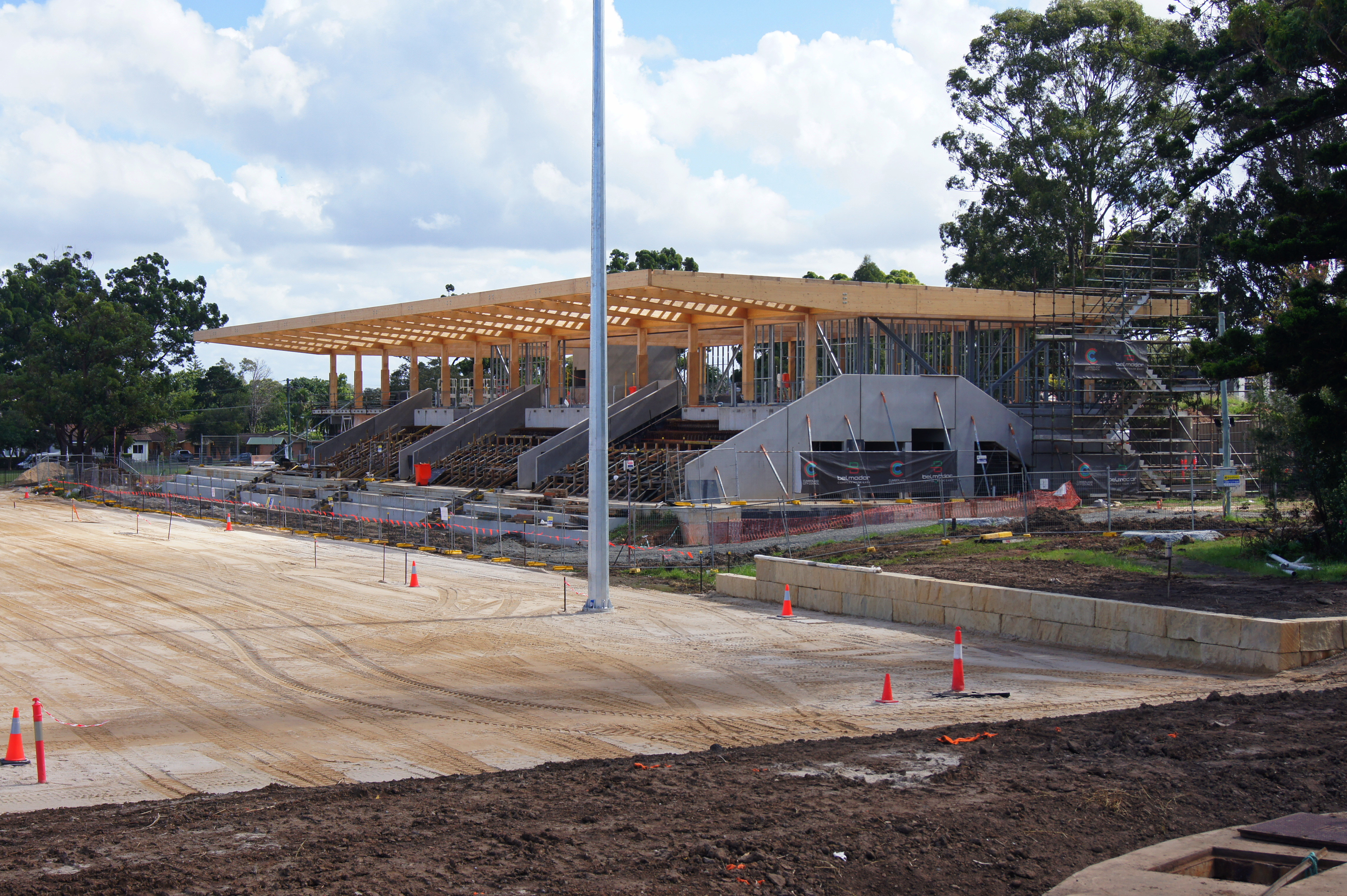
- Interactive map of Eric Tweedale Stadium
- Location: Montrose Avenue, Merrylands, New South Wales
- Coordinates: 33°50′25″S 150°59′48″E
- Owner: Cumberland Council
- Capacity: 5,000 (1,000 seated)
- Surface: Grass

Construction
- Opened: November 2021
- Cost: $11.3 million

Tenants
- Parramatta R.C. (Shute Shield); Greater Sydney Rams (NRC) (2015)

Eric Tweedale Stadium (formerly Granville Park Stadium), for sponsorship reasons also known as Merrylands RSL Rugby Park, is a rectangular stadium in Granville Park in the western Sydney suburb of Merrylands, New South Wales. The stadium, which cost $11.3 million, designed by ARCH (formerly dwp), was opened in November 2021 on the grounds of a previous stadium which was generally referred to as Granville Park. The total capacity for the ground is 5,000, 750 of whom can be seated on the grandstand.

One of the first sports clubs to play at Granville Park was the Granville Royals Rugby Club in the late 1880s.

The land was owned by the City of Parramatta until May 2017 when the newly created Cumberland Council inherited the park, as a result of New South Wales council mergers.

The stadium is the home ground of the Parramatta Two Blues club, founded in 1879, which competes in Sydney's premier rugby union competition, the Shute Shield.

The clubhouse has a large hall suitable for hosting functions as well as changing room facilities and amenities. The main field has lighting suitable for hosting night time sports events.

In 2021, the ground was renamed after the Australian rugby international and Two Blues player Eric Tweedale on the occasion of his 100th birthday.

Granville Park is also one of the home grounds for the Greater Sydney Rams team, which plays in the National Rugby Championship. The New South Wales Waratahs team plays occasional pre-season trial matches at the ground.

There are also sporting facilities for soccer, cricket, and basketball. A children's Splash Park was built in 2014, and the reserve also has barbeque and picnic facilities.

Over the course of the 2024 National Rugby League Women's season, the Parramatta Eels played two home games at Eric Tweedale Stadium. The first of which was against the Newcastle Knights on 24 August 2024, whom they lost to, 36–16. The second home game they played at the venue was against the Gold Coast Titans on 8 September 2024.

The stadium is scheduled to host the first-ever match of the Perth Bears when they play the Parramatta Eels in the men's 2027 NRL Pre-season Challenge on Sunday 14 February 2027, kicking off at 4:05pm.
