= 2027 Cronulla-Sutherland Sharks season =

- NRL Rank: TBD

Team information
- CEO: Dino Mezzatesta
- Coach: (Australia) Craig Fitzgibbon
- Captain: (Australia) Blayke Brailey
- Stadium: Ocean Protect Stadium (Capacity: 15,000)
← 2026	List of seasons	2028 →

The 2027 Cronulla-Sutherland Sharks season is the 61st season in the club's history and they compete in the National Rugby League.

The club is coached by Craig Fitzgibbon in his fifth season, with the Sharks and captained by Blayke Brailey.

== 2027 squad ==
Cronulla Sharks 2024 squad
Top 30 squad - 2027 NRL season			Supplementary list	Coaching staff
Will Kennedy – FB; Ronaldo Mulitalo – WG; KL Iro – CE; Riley Jones – CE; Samuel Stonestreet – WG; Braydon Trindall – FE, HB; Nicho Hynes (vc) – HB	Addin Fonua-Blake – PR; Blayke Brailey (c) – HK, HB; Oregon Kaufusi – PR; Briton Nikora – SR; Teig Wilton – SR; Jesse Colquhoun – PR, SR	Michael Gabrael – CE; Hohepa Puru – LK; Thomas Hazelton – PR; Billy Burns – SR; Riley Pollard – HB; Liam Ison – FB	Harrison Hassett – SR; Blake Hosking – LK, SR; Tuku Hau Tapuha – PR; Owen Trout – PR; Brad Fearnley – PR; Extended squad: Thomas Dellow; Felix Fa'atili; Leo Jaques – WG	Head coach: Craig Fitzgibbon; Assistant coaches: Daniel Holdsworth; Frédéric Michalak; Steve Price; Legend: (c) Captain(s); (vc) Vice-captain(s); Updated: 21 November 2026; Source(s):

== Regular season ==
=== Ladder ===
Template:NRL2027Ladder

=== Matches ===
The league fixtures were announced on 21 November 2026.

Win Draw Loss Fixtures
