= Iszac Fa'asuamaleaui =

Australian rugby league player

Iszac Faasuamaleaui
Personal information
- Full name: Iszac Fa'asuamaleaui
- Born: 1 December 2001 (age 24) Gympie, Queensland, Australia
- Height: 6 ft 4 in (1.94 m)
- Weight: 17 st 5 lb (110 kg)

Playing information
- Position: Prop
Club
Years	Team	Pld	T	G	FG	P
2023–25	Gold Coast Titans	28	1	0	0	4
2026	Catalans Dragons	10	0	0	0	0
2027–	Perth Bears	0	0	0	0	0
	Total	38	1	0	0	4
- Source: As of 20 October 2026
- Father: Fereti Fa'asuamaleaui
- Relatives: Tino Fa'asuamaleaui (brother)

Iszac Fa'asuamaleaui (/ˈfəsuːəməlaʊi/) (born 1 December 2001) is a professional rugby league footballer who plays as a prop for the Perth Bears in the NRL.

== Background ==
Fa'asuamaleaui was born in Gympie, Queensland, Australia to a Samoan father and an Australian mother. His father, Fereti Fa'asuamaleaui, was contracted to the Sydney City Roosters and played reserve grade for them in the mid-1990s, having previously represented Samoa in rugby union. He is the brother of Tino Fa'asuamaleaui.

Iszac was educated at James Nash State High School, Gympie.

== Playing career ==
Fa'asuamaleaui played his junior rugby league for the Gympie Devils and was then signed by the Gold Coast Titans in 2020. In 2021 and 2022, Fa'asuamaleaui played for the Titans' Queensland Cup feeder side, the Burleigh Bears. In 2023, despite still being on a development contract, Fa’asuamaleaui was elevated to the Gold Coast Titans first grade side.

Fa’asuamaleaui made his first grade debut in his side's 38–34 victory over the Melbourne Storm at Robina Stadium in round 3 of the 2023 NRL season. He played a total of 13 games for the Gold Coast in the 2023 NRL season as the club finished 14th on the table.

=== 2025 ===
On 20 August, the Gold Coast outfit announced that Fa'asuamaleaui would leave the club at the end of the season as he had secured a deal with French side Catalans in the Super League.

On 4 December it was reported that the Perth Bears had signed Fa'asuamaleaui as another marquee signing. On 10 December the signing was confirmed by the Bears

=== 2026 ===
On 14 June 2026 it was reported that he had signed for Ipswich Jets in the Queensland Cup

== Statistics ==
Year	Team	Games	Tries	Pts
2023	Gold Coast Titans	13	1	4
2024	Gold Coast Titans	1	0	0
2025	Gold Coast Titans	5	0	0
2026	Catalans Dragons	10	0	0
2026	Ipswich Jets	0	0	0
2027	Perth Bears	0	0	0
	Totals	38	1	4
