= Liam Henry (rugby league) =

Australian rugby league footballer

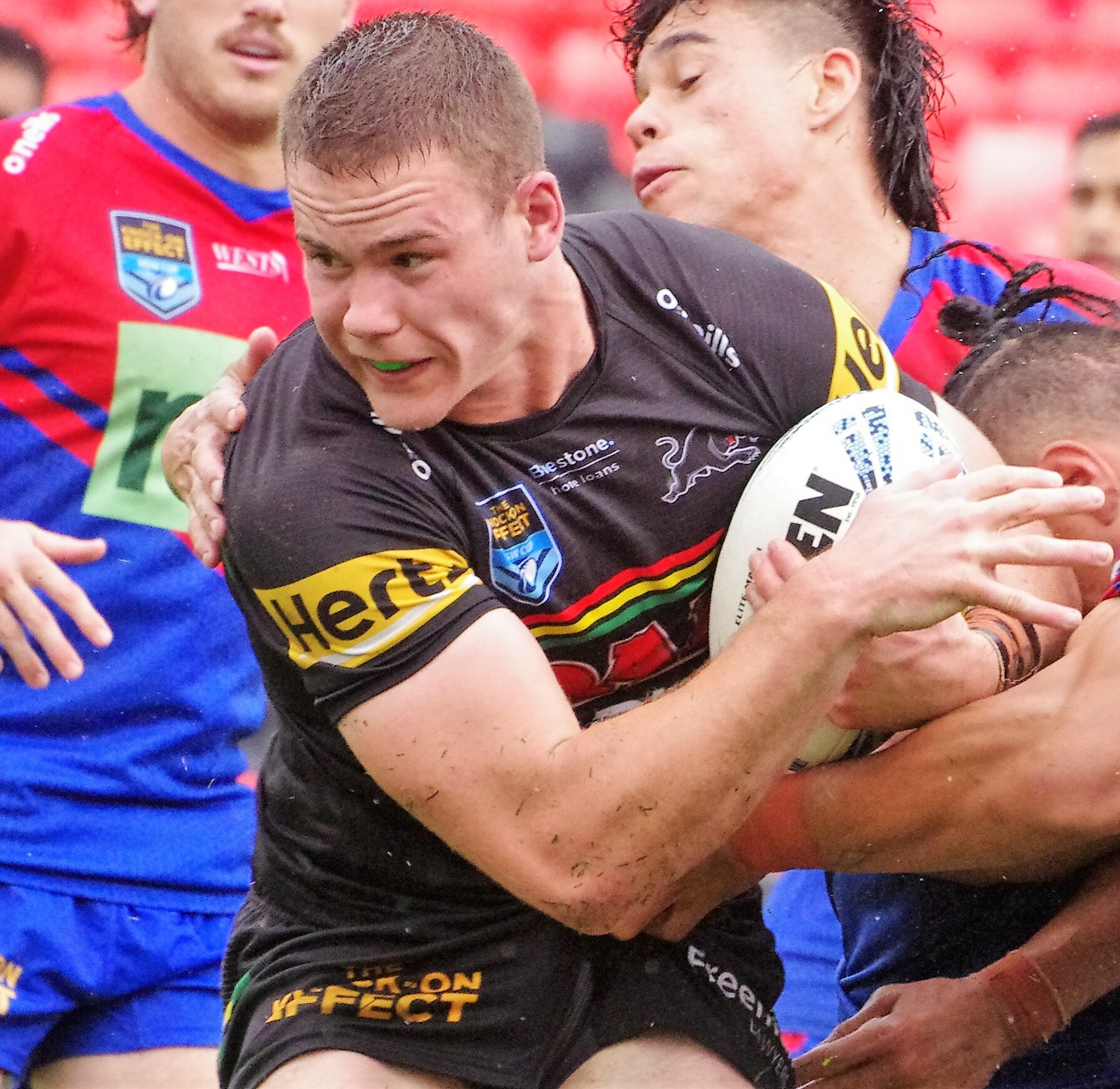

Personal information
- Born: 24 July 2001 (age 25) Blayney, New South Wales, Australia
- Height: 190 cm (6 ft 3 in)
- Weight: 105 kg (16 st 7 lb)

Playing information
- Position: Prop, Second-row
Club
Years	Team	Pld	T	G	FG	P
2022–26	Penrith Panthers	67	9	0	0	36
2027–	Perth Bears	0	0	0	0	0
	Total	67	9	0	0	36
Representative
Years	Team	Pld	T	G	FG	P
2025	Prime Minister's XIII	1	0	0	0	0
- Source: As of 17 November 2026

Liam Henry (born 24 July 2001) is an Australian professional rugby league footballer who plays as a prop for the Perth Bears in the National Rugby League (NRL).

== Playing career ==
In round 25 of the 2022 NRL season, Henry made his debut for Penrith against the North Queensland Cowboys. On 24 February 2024, Henry played in Penrith's 2024 World Club Challenge final loss against Wigan. Henry made 24 appearances for Penrith in the 2024 NRL season. Henry played in Penrith's 2024 NRL Grand Final victory over Melbourne. Henry played a total of 23 games for Penrith in the 2025 NRL season as the club finished 7th on the table. He played in Penrith's narrow preliminary final loss against Brisbane.

=== 2025 ===
On 12 October 2025 he made his debut for the Prime Minister's XIII in the 28-10 win over PNG Prime Minister's XIII in Port Moresby. On 10 December 2025, Henry signed a four year contract with the new team Perth Bears commencing in their inaugural season 2027.

== Statistics ==
Year	Team	Games	Tries	Pts
2022	Penrith Panthers	1		
2023	Penrith Panthers	2		
2024	Penrith Panthers	24	2	8
2025	Penrith Panthers	23	3	12
2026	Penrith Panthers	11	3	12
2027	Perth Bears			
	Totals	61	8	32
