= Morgan Smithies =

England international rugby league footballer

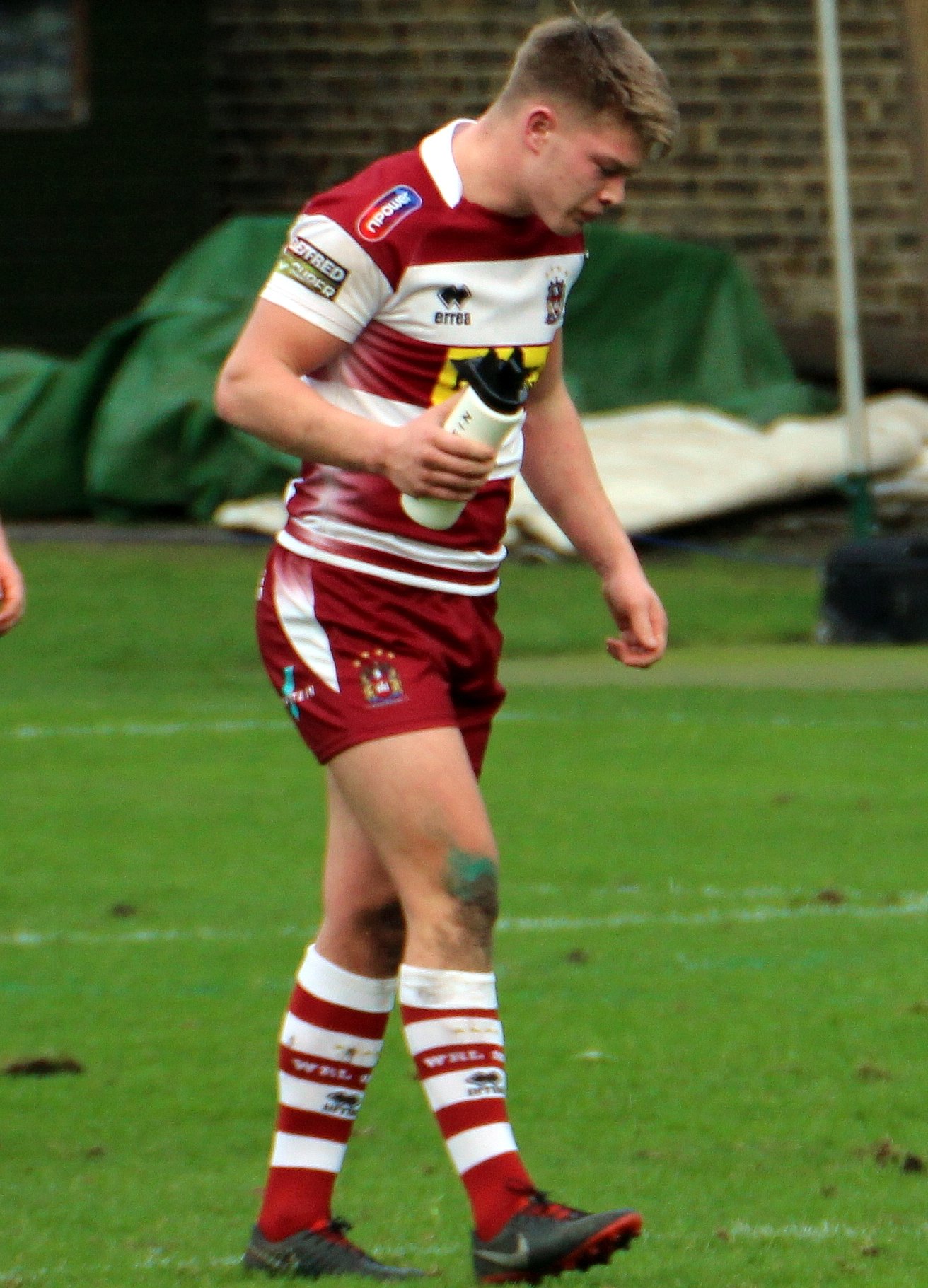

Personal information
- Full name: Morgan Smithies
- Born: 7 November 2000 (age 25) Halifax, West Yorkshire, England
- Height: 185 cm (6 ft 1 in)
- Weight: 101 kg (15 st 13 lb)

Playing information
- Position: Lock, Second-row, Prop
Club
Years	Team	Pld	T	G	FG	P
2019–23	Wigan Warriors	114	2	0	0	8
2024–26	Canberra Raiders	70	1	0	0	4
2027–	Perth Bears	0	0	0	0	0
	Total	184	3	0	0	12
Representative
Years	Team	Pld	T	G	FG	P
2019	England Knights	1	0	0	0	0
2023–25	England	3	0	0	0	0
- Source: As of 6 November 2026

Morgan Smithies (born 7 November 2000) is an English professional rugby league footballer who plays as a lock and second-row forward for the Perth Bears in the NRL and both England and the England Knights at international level.

He previously played for the Wigan Warriors in the Super League.

== Background ==
Smithies was born in Halifax, West Yorkshire, England. He attended The Brooksbank School. Smithies played his junior rugby at Siddal ARLFC, signing for Wigan in 2015.

== Career ==
=== Wigan Warriors ===
In 2019 he made his Super League début for Wigan against the Catalans Dragons. He played in the 2020 Super League Grand Final which Wigan lost 8–4 against St Helens. On 28 May 2022, Smithies played for Wigan in their 2022 Challenge Cup Final victory over Huddersfield. On 1 June 2022, Smithies was banned for four matches over two dangerous high tackles which occurred during Wigan's Challenge Cup final win. On 14 October 2023, Smithies played in Wigan's 2023 Super League Grand Final victory over the Catalans Dragons.

=== Canberra Raiders ===
On 31 October 2023, it was confirmed that he would join Canberra starting in the 2024 season on a three-year deal. In round 1 of the 2024 NRL season,Smithies made his club debut for Canberra in their victory over Newcastle. Smithies played 24 games for Canberra in the 2024 NRL season as the club finished 9th on the table. On 24 February 2025, it was revealed that Smithies had been briefly refused entry from the Canberra sides Las Vegas hotel after he became involved in a scuffle with teammate Hudson Young. Head coach Ricky Stuart later spoke to the media saying “I have spoken to the players who are very embarrassed,” Stuart said. “The behaviour was unacceptable. The club will deal with this strongly". Smithies played 25 matches for Canberra in the 2025 NRL season as the club claimed the Minor Premiership. He played in both finals matches as Canberra went out in straight sets losing to both Brisbane and Cronulla.

On 6 August 2026, the Perth Bears announced that Smithies had signed a three-year deal with the team beginning in 2027. Smithies played 21 games for Canberra in the 2026 NRL season as the club finished 11th on the table and missed the finals.

== International career ==
In 2019 he was selected for the England Knights against Jamaica at Headingley Rugby Stadium.

He made his full England début on 29 April 2023 in the 64–0 victory over France at the Halliwell Jones Stadium.

He was included in the initial England squad for the 2026 Rugby League World Cup, but withdrew due to a hamstring injury immediately prior to the tournament start

== Statistics ==
Year	Team	Games	Tries	Pts
2019	Wigan Warriors	24	1	4
2020	Wigan Warriors	16		
2021	Wigan Warriors	19		
2022	Wigan Warriors	24		
2023	Wigan Warriors	31	1	4
2024	Canberra Raiders	24		
2025	Canberra Raiders	25	1	4
2026	Canberra Raiders	21		
2027	Perth Bears			
	Totals	184	3	12
