= Tino Fa'asuamaleaui =

Australia international rugby league footballer

Tino Faasuamaleaui
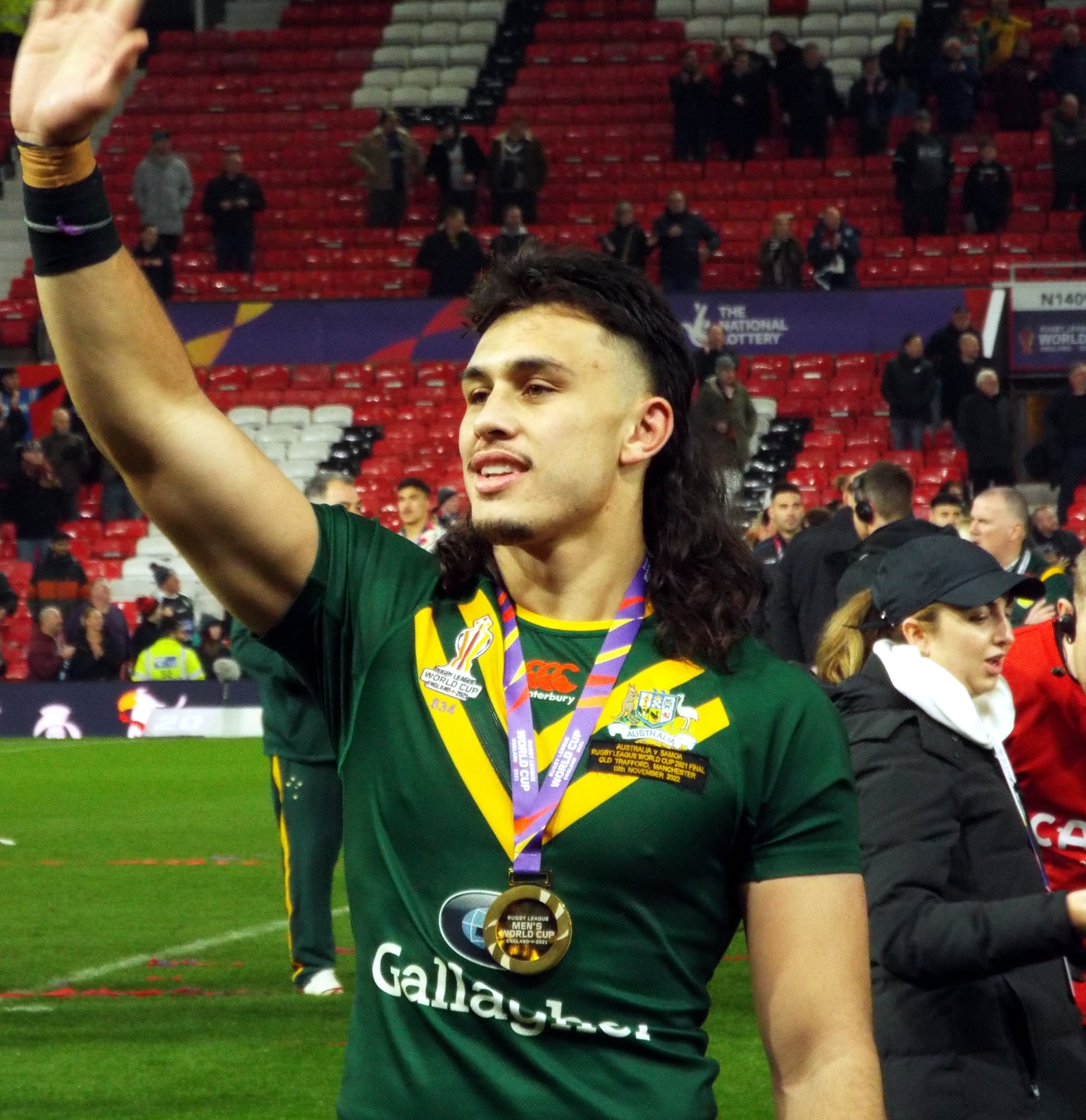

Personal information
- Full name: Tino Fa'asuamaleaui
- Born: 16 February 2000 (age 26) Orange, New South Wales, Australia
- Height: 197 cm (6 ft 6 in)
- Weight: 115 kg (18 st 2 lb)

Playing information
- Position: Prop, Lock
Club
Years	Team	Pld	T	G	FG	P
2019–20	Melbourne Storm	27	7	0	0	28
2021–	Gold Coast Titans	105	19	0	0	76
	Total	132	26	0	0	104
Representative
Years	Team	Pld	T	G	FG	P
2019–23	Prime Minister's XIII	3	0	0	0	0
2019	Samoa	1	0	0	0	0
2019	Samoa 9s	3	0	0	0	0
2019	Queensland Residents	1	0	0	0	0
2020–26	Queensland	18	0	0	0	0
2022–	Australia	15	3	0	0	12
- Source: As of 16 November 2026
- Education: James Nash State High School, Gympie
- Father: Fereti Fa'asuamaleaui
- Relatives: Iszac Fa'asuamaleaui (brother)

Tino Fa'asuamaleaui (/ˈfəsuːəməlaʊi/) (born 16 February 2000) is a professional rugby league footballer who captains the Gold Coast Titans playing as a prop and lock forward in the National Rugby League (NRL). He has played for Samoa and Australia at international level, winning the World Cup twice with the latter.

He previously played for the Melbourne Storm with whom he won the 2020 NRL Grand Final. He has played for the Prime Minister's XIII and the Queensland Maroons in the State of Origin series.

== Background ==
Fa'asuamaleaui was born in Orange, New South Wales, Australia to a Samoan father and a white Australian mother. His father, Fereti Fa'asuamaleaui, was contracted to the Sydney City Roosters and played reserve grade for them in the mid-1990s. Fereti had previously represented Samoa in rugby union.

When he was 14 weeks old, his family moved to Widgee, Queensland, where he attended James Nash State High School, Gympie. He played his junior rugby league for the Gympie Devils and was then signed by the Brisbane Broncos as a teenager. He is the brother of Iszac Fa'asuamaleaui.

== Playing career ==
=== Early career ===
In 2016, Fa'asuamaleaui played for the Central Crows in the Cyril Connell Cup and was selected to represent the Queensland under-16 side.

In 2017, after starting the season with the Sunshine Coast Falcons Mal Meninga Cup side, he signed with Melbourne, playing for their NYC side. In June, he was selected for the Queensland under-18 side

In 2018, Fa'asuamaleaui began the season playing for the Storm's Queensland Cup feeder side, the Sunshine Coast Falcons, before switching to the club's other feeder, the Easts Tigers, midway through the year. In June, he was again selected for the Queensland under-18 side. In July, he came off the bench in the Queensland under-20's first ever win over New South Wales. In October, he scored two tries in the Junior Kangaroos 40–24 win over the Junior Kiwis.

=== 2019 ===
In Round 16 of the 2019 NRL season, Fa'asuamaleaui made his NRL debut for Melbourne against the St. George. On 7 October, Fa’asuamaleaui was named on the bench for the U23 Junior Australian side. He then followed up by making his international test debut for Toa Samoa. On 19 December, Fa'asuamaleaui signed a three-year deal with the Gold Coast Titans starting in 2021.

=== 2020 ===
Fa’asuamaleaui played off the bench in Melbourne's 2020 NRL Grand Final win over the Penrith Panthers in a 26-20 win. At the Melbourne Storm Player of the Year Awards in October 2020, he was awarded the Rookie of the Year Award.

After the grand final, he was rewarded by making his Queensland Maroons debut in the 2020 State of Origin series Game 1 at the Adelaide Oval.

=== 2021 ===
He made his club debut for the Gold Coast in round 1 of the 2021 NRL season against the New Zealand Warriors. In round 6, he was placed on report for an illegal shoulder charge during the club's 36-0 loss against Manly-Warringah and suspended for two games.

He played 23 games for the Gold Coast in the 2021 NRL season including the club's elimination final loss against the Sydney Roosters. On 23 November, he signed a $3.3 million contract extension to remain at the Gold Coast until the end of the 2026 season.

=== 2022 ===
On 3 February, he was named as captain of the Gold Coast Titans.

In May, he was selected by Queensland for games one, two and three of the 2022 State of Origin series. In game three, he was fined 20% of his payment for the game after grabbing Blues player Matt Burton in a headlock while teammate Dane Gagai repeatedly punched him. It was described as a sickening, disgraceful act and went without proper punishment. Following the incident, Fa’asuamaleaui revealed that he and his family were subjected to hate online.

He played a total of 22 games for the club throughout the season as they finished 13th on the table.

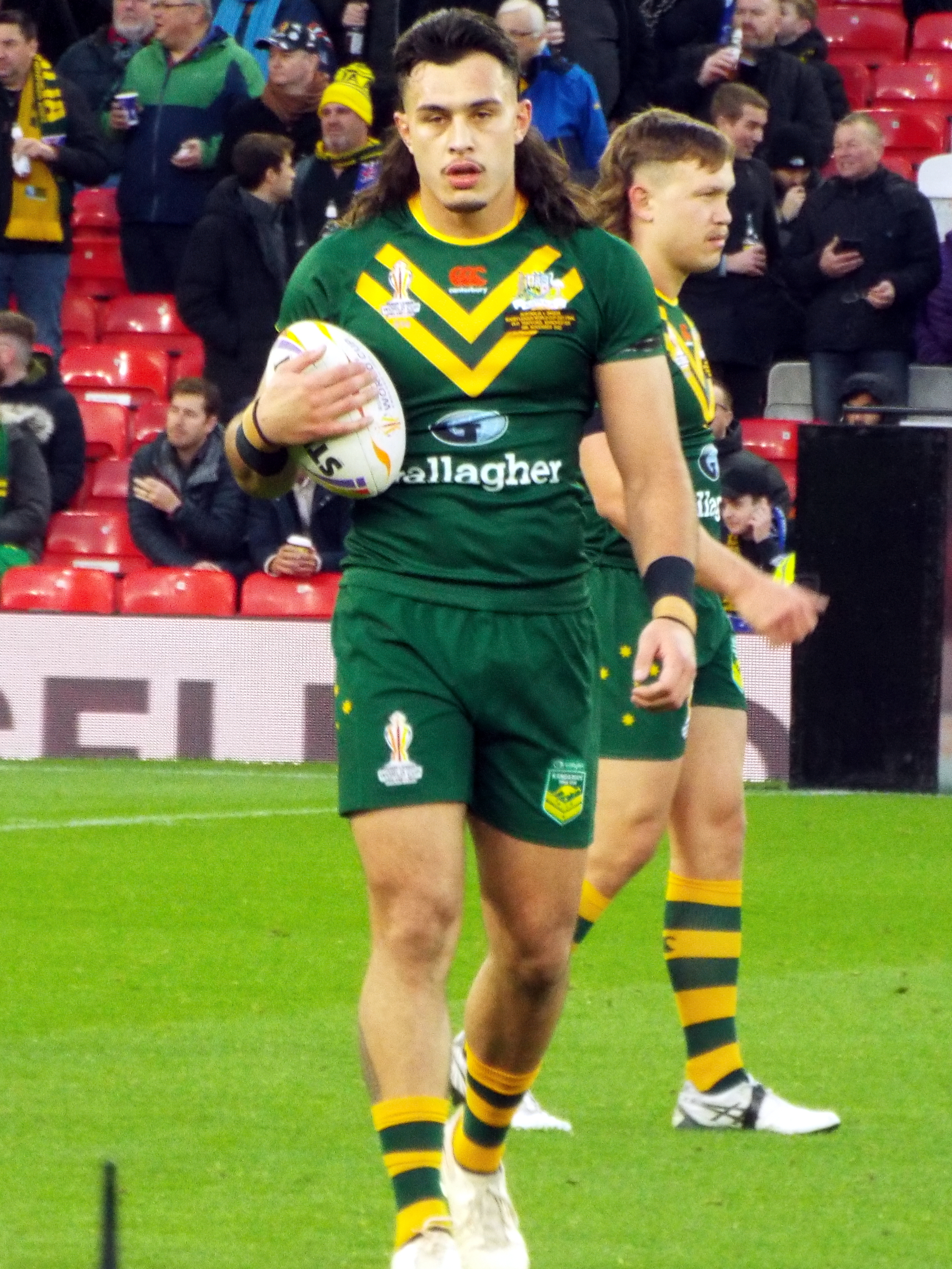
Fa'asuamaleaui playing for Australia in 2022

In October, he was named in the Australia squad for the 2021 Rugby League World Cup.

He played for Australia in their 2021 Rugby League World Cup final victory over Samoa.

=== 2023 ===
Fa’asuamaleaui played all three games of the 2023 State of Origin series. Following the Gold Coast's 25-24 loss against Parramatta in round 20 of the 2023 NRL season, Fa'asuamaleaui was suspended for three matches over an illegal shoulder charge.

On 11 August, Fa'asuamaleaui re-signed with the Gold Coast outfit on a ten-year extension contract. He played a total of 19 matches for the Gold Coast in the 2023 NRL season as the club finished 14th on the table.

=== 2024 ===
Fa’asuamaleaui played just two games for the Gold Coast in the 2024 NRL season, suffering a ruptured ACL in their round 3 loss to the Canterbury-Bankstown Bulldogs and being ruled out of the remainder of the season.

=== 2025 ===
Fa'asuamaleaui played as starting prop in all three games of the 2025 State of Origin series as Queensland upset New South Wales to claim the shield 2-1. On 22 July, it was announced that he would miss at least four weeks with a low-grade MCL injury that he suffered during the Gold Coast's 21-20 loss against the Wests Tigers. He played a total of 19 games for the Gold Coast in the 2025 NRL season as the club narrowly avoided the wooden spoon, finishing 16th.

=== 2026 ===
On 4 February 2026, Fa'asuamaleaui confirmed his future with the Gold Coast Titans by committing to the club until the end of 2030. He played over 20 matches for the Gold Coast in the 2026 NRL season as the club finished 16th on the table.

== Statistics ==
Year	Team	Games	Tries	Pts
2019	Melbourne Storm	5		
2020	Melbourne Storm	22	7	28
2021	Gold Coast Titans	22	4	16
2022	Gold Coast Titans	22	4	16
2023	Gold Coast Titans	19	6	24
2024	Gold Coast Titans	2		
2025	Gold Coast Titans	19	3	12
2026	Gold Coast Titans	21	2	8
2027	Gold Coast Titans			
	Totals	132	26	104

== Honours ==
Individual

- Melbourne Storm Rookie of the Year: 2020
- Gold Coast Titans Member’s MVP: 2021
- Gold Coast Titans Player of the Year: 2021, 2022

Club

- 2020 NRL Grand Final Winners

Representative

- 2020 State of Origin series Winners
- 2022 State of Origin series Winners
- 2023 State of Origin series Winners
- 2025 State of Origin series Winners

International

- 2021 Rugby League World Cup Winners
- 2025 Australian Ashes Tour Winners
- 2026 Rugby League World Cup Winners
