= Joshua Curran =

Australian rugby league footballer

Josh Curran
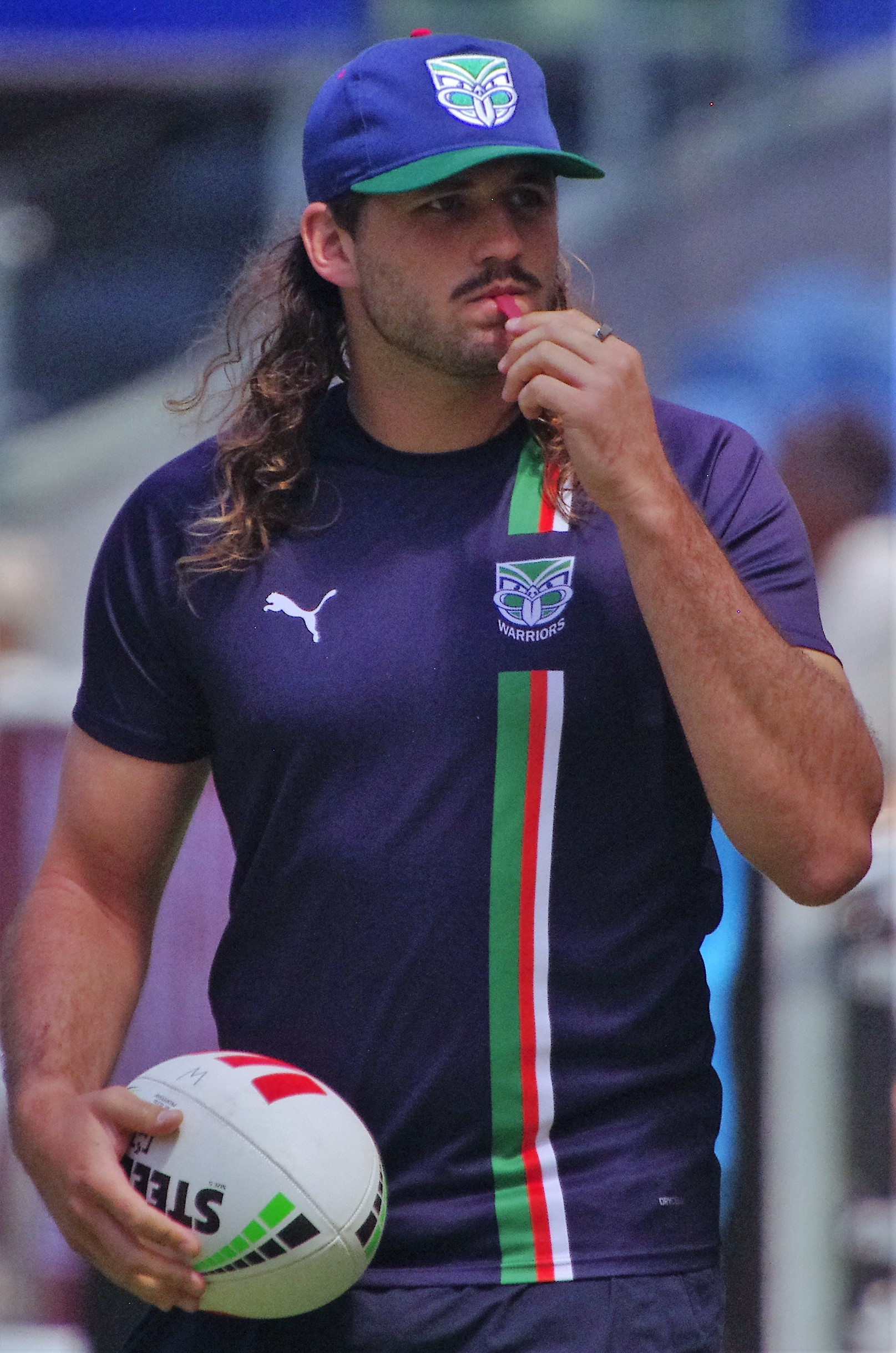

Personal information
- Full name: Joshua Curran
- Born: 10 June 1999 (age 27) Sydney, New South Wales, Australia
- Height: 185 cm (6 ft 1 in)
- Weight: 104 kg (16 st 5 lb)

Playing information
- Position: Second-row, Prop, Lock
Club
Years	Team	Pld	T	G	FG	P
2019	Sydney Roosters	1	0	0	0	0
2019–23	New Zealand Warriors	60	12	0	0	48
2024–26	Canterbury Bulldogs	61	13	0	0	52
2027–	Perth Bears	0	0	0	0	0
	Total	122	25	0	0	100
Representative
Years	Team	Pld	T	G	FG	P
2020–24	Indigenous All Stars	4	1	0	0	4
2022–26	Prime Minister's XIII	3	0	1	0	2
- Source: As of 22 November 2026

Joshua Curran (born 10 June 1999) is an Australian professional rugby league footballer who plays second-row, lock and prop forward for the Perth Bears in the National Rugby League (NRL).

He previously played for the Sydney Roosters, New Zealand Warriors and Canterbury Bulldogs in the NRL.

== Early life ==
Curran was born in Sydney, New South Wales, Australia, he is of Indigenous Australian (Darug) and Irish descent. He was educated at Patrician Brothers' College, Blacktown.

Curran played his junior rugby league for Merrylands Rams and Hills District Bulls.

Curran then played for the Parramatta Harold Matthews and SG Ball teams.

== Playing career ==
=== 2017 & 2018 ===
Curran joined the Sydney Roosters in 2017 and made 28 appearances in their under-20s team in 2017 and 2018, and also played nine times for the Roosters then feeder club Wyong Roos in the Intrust Super Premiership in 2018.

=== 2019 ===
In 2019, he played nine times for the Sydney Roosters feeder club, North Sydney, in the Canterbury Cup.

On 25 June 2019, it was announced that he had signed with the New Zealand Warriors until the end of the 2021 NRL season. In Round 20 of the 2019 NRL season, Curran made his NRL club debut for the Sydney Roosters against the Canberra Raiders.

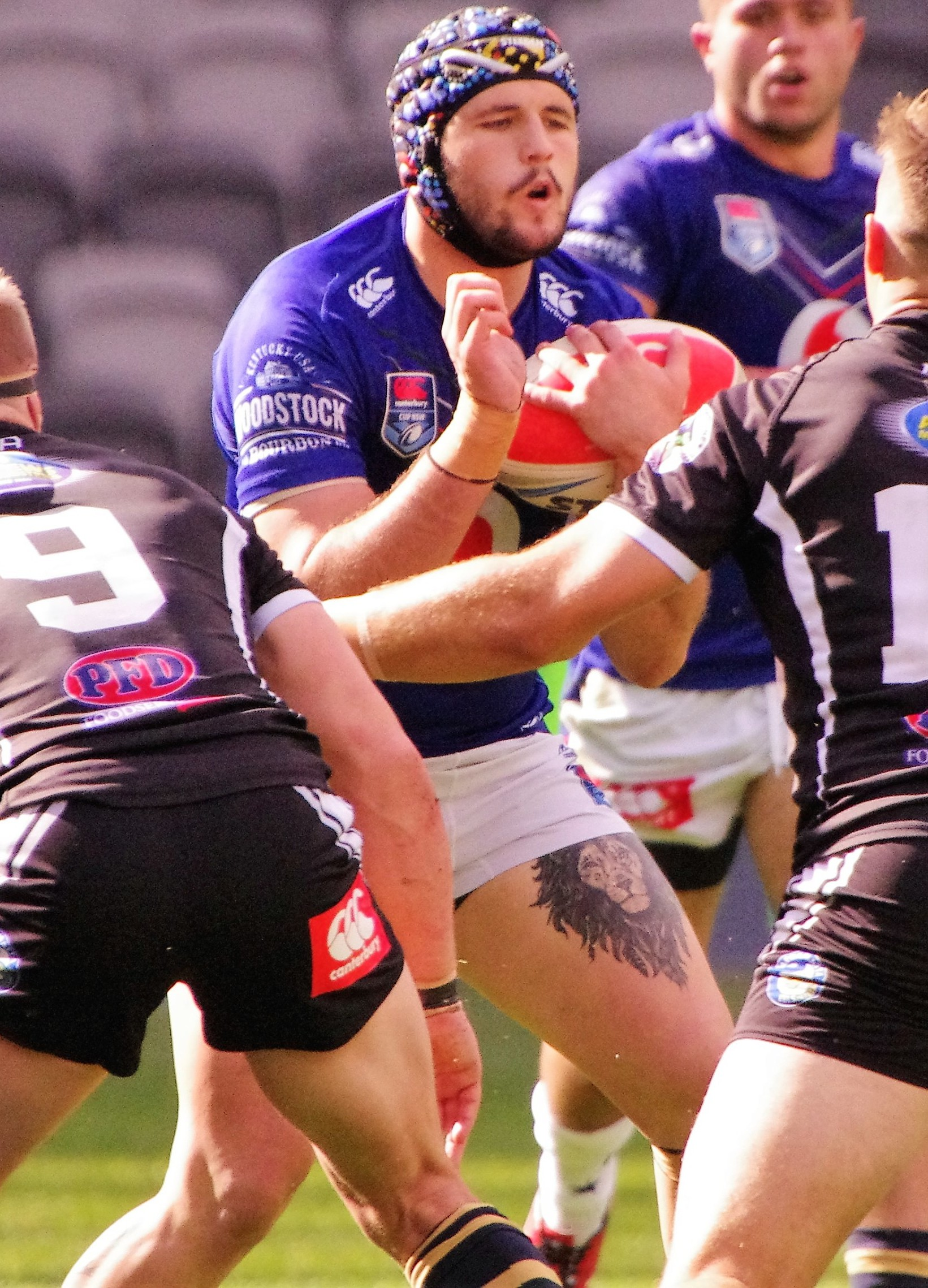
Curran playing for the New Zealand Warriors in 2019

=== 2022 ===
In round 7 of the 2022 NRL season, Curran was taken from the field during the New Zealand's record 70-10 loss against Melbourne at AAMI Park. The following day, scans revealed that Curran had suffered an MCL injury and would be ruled out indefinitely from playing, however two months later, he returned off the bench in the New Zealand Warriors 16-38 Round 14 loss to Cronulla-Sutherland. Curran made a total of 18 appearances for the New Zealand club as they finished 15th on the table. On 5 October, Curran was placed under investigation by the NRL after a 16-year old boy was assaulted at a late-night venue in Port Macquarie. The boy had his front teeth knocked out over the incident and the perpetrator was believed to be Curran. The New Zealand Warriors club released a statement which read "Warriors CEO Cameron George has confirmed knowledge of an alleged incident involving forward Josh Curran at a licensed premises over the weekend in Port Macquarie. The club wishes to advise that the incident has been reported to the NRL Integrity Unit and will now await any further information from the NRL investigation."

On 21 October, Curran was charged by NSW Police over the incident with a statement reading "Following inquiries, investigators arrested a 23-year-old man after attending Manly Police Station on Wednesday. He was charged with reckless grievous bodily harm, assault occasioning actual bodily harm and larceny. The man was granted conditional bail to appear at Port Macquarie Local Court on Wednesday 7 December."

=== 2023 ===
Curran played 23 games for the New Zealand Warriors in the 2023 NRL season as the club finished 4th on the table and qualified for the finals. Curran played in all three finals games as the club reached the preliminary final stage before being knocked out by Brisbane. Curran was released from the final year of his Warriors contract to join the Canterbury-Bankstown Bulldogs on a two-year deal.

=== 2024 ===
In round 1 of the 2024 NRL season, Curran made his club debut for Canterbury in their 26-8 loss against arch-rivals Parramatta. Curran played 24 games for Canterbury in the 2024 NRL season as they qualified for the finals finishing 6th. He played in the clubs elimination final loss against Manly. On 2 October, the Canterbury club announced that they had re-signed Curran until the end of 2027.

=== 2025 ===
Curran played 21 matches for Canterbury in the 2025 NRL season as the club finished fourth and qualified for the finals. Canterbury would be eliminated from the finals in straight sets.

=== 2026 ===
On 7 January, the Perth Bears announced that they had signed Curran, on a three year deal, he became the clubs eighth signing. Following Canterbury's round 23 loss against the Sydney Roosters in the 2026 NRL season, Curran's partner publicly criticised the Canterbury club on social media due to the fact Curran who is of indigenous heritage was an unused substitute during the indigenous round fixture. Curran played 16 games for Canterbury in the 2026 NRL season as the club finished 12th on the table.

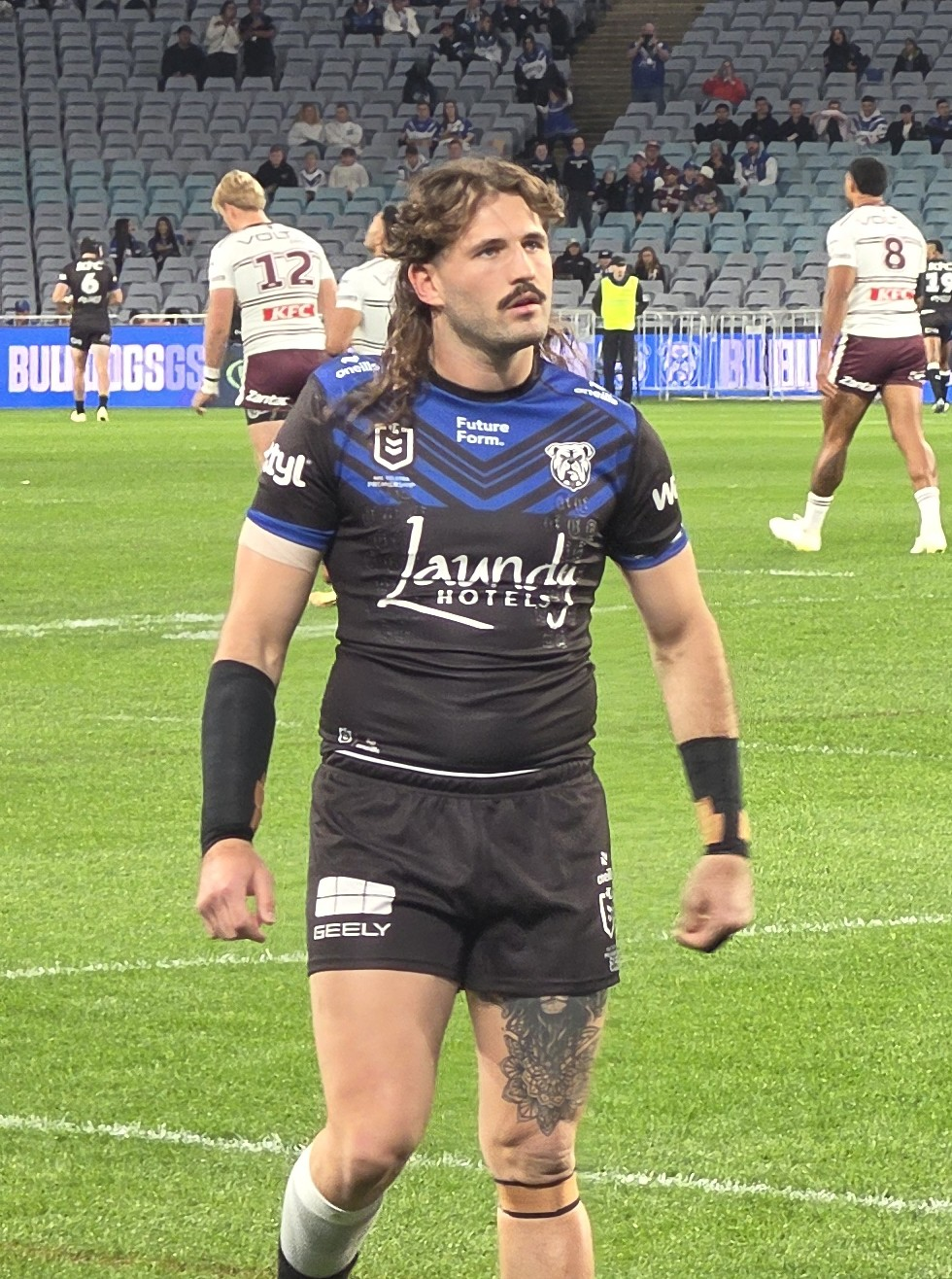
Curran with the Bulldogs in 2026

He played for the Prime Minister's XIII on 3 October 2026 in the 10-60 win over PNG Prime Minister's XIII in Port Moresby, kicking one goal.

== Statistics ==
Year	Team	Games	Tries	Pts
2019	Sydney Roosters	1		
2019	New Zealand Warriors	2		
2020	New Zealand Warriors	3		
2021	New Zealand Warriors	14	4	16
2022	New Zealand Warriors	18	4	16
2023	New Zealand Warriors	23	4	16
2024	Canterbury-Bankstown Bulldogs	24	3	12
2025	Canterbury-Bankstown Bulldogs	21	4	16
2026	Canterbury-Bankstown Bulldogs	16	6	24
2027	Perth Bears			
	Totals	122	25	100
