= Perth Bears =

Australian rugby league football club, based in Perth

Club information
- Full name: Perth Bears Limited
- Nickname: Bears
- Colours: Primary; Red; Black; Secondary; White
- Founded: 2025
- Website: perthbears.com.au

Current details
- Grounds: Perth Rectangular Stadium (20,500); Perth Stadium (60,000)
- CEO: Tony Rea
- Chairman: Ben Morton
- Coach: Mal Meninga
- Manager: Gareth Holmes
- Captain: TBA
- Competition: National Rugby League (2027 season)

Records
- Premierships: 0
- Runners-up: 0
- Minor premierships: 0
- First match: Parramatta Eels v Perth Bears Eric Tweedale Stadium (14 February 2027)
- First NRL game: Perth Bears v Manly-Warringah Sea Eagles; Perth Stadium (7 March 2027)
- Wooden spoons: 0

The Perth Bears are a professional rugby league football club based in Perth, Western Australia, who will compete in the National Rugby League (NRL) from the 2027 season.

The Perth Bears emerged from a bid to return the North Sydney Bears to the NRL in Perth. North Sydney, one of the competition's foundation clubs (1908), had exited the NRL in 1999.

In 2024, a "Western Bears" bid began working with North Sydney to bring a Perth-based team into the competition. The original bid was rejected by the Australian Rugby League Commission (ARLC) in October 2024. Negotiations then resumed in April 2025 between the ARLC and the Western Australian Government, and on 8 May 2025 an agreement was reached to admit the new club into the competition in 2027 as the Perth Bears. The Western Australian Government committed $85.6 million over seven years to support the club. The ARLC will own the club for at least the first five years, before it becomes member-owned.

The Perth Bears' colours are red, black and white, based on the traditional red and black of the North Sydney Bears.

== History ==
=== Background ===
Western Australia (WA) had no elite-level national rugby league team after the Western Reds folded at the end of the 1997 Australian Super League season. The club had played as the Western Reds in the Australian Rugby League in 1995–96, before joining the Australian Super League as the Perth Reds in 1997.

The Reds' name was revived in 2006 as the WA Reds, who played in the third-tier Jim Beam Cup and later Bundaberg Red Cup (now Ron Massey Cup) in New South Wales (NSW). In 2012, the club rebranded as the West Coast Pirates, after WARL research found just over 50% of the marketplace associated the Reds name with failure. The Pirates played junior rugby league in the NSW S.G. Ball Cup until 2020, when the COVID-19 pandemic prevented interstate travel. They did not re-enter the competition when it resumed in 2021.

=== 2024—2025: Expansion process ===
In August 2024, a consortium of WA businessmen were prepared to independently revive the Reds name to get a team back into the national competition. However, they wanted the team to be Western Australian controlled and owned, as opposed to being a relocated Sydney team. The NRL's preferred model was an alignment with the North Sydney Bears. Talks were held with NSW clubs the North Sydney Bears and the Newtown Jets, but the latter pulled out of talks when Australian entrepreneur John Singleton stated that the North Sydney Bears were always intended to be the partner.

In August 2024, the North Sydney Bears and a Western Australian consortium headed by Cash Converters founders jointly lodged an application for the "Western Bears" to enter a team ahead of the 2027 NRL season. The Australian Rugby League Commission (ARLC) rejected this proposal in October, stating that the $20 million bid fell short of its expectations. Urgent talks were held in November between the Western Australian Government and ARLC chairman Peter V'landys about an expansion team in Perth. On 24 April 2025, the NRL agreed to a $50 million deal with the Western Australian Government, thereby securing the 2027 return of the Bears' brand.

Under the terms of the final agreement with the ARLC, the WA government committed to spending a total of $85.6 million, including $35 million on grassroots rugby league over the next seven years, with the remaining $50.6 million consisting of $25 million on content over the next five years, $5.6 million to help with the costs of the new team, and $20 million for a Centre of Excellence. The WA government will not pay a licence fee, and its home ground, Perth Rectangular Stadium (HBF Park) is expected to be upgraded. The ARLC owns the club for at least the first five years while it is managed at arm's-length from the ARLC's Sydney head office, before it becomes member-owned. The NRL subsequently renamed the "Western Bears" to the "Perth Bears" to give the team a clear geographical link to the region in which it will be based and remove all links to the previous bid.

=== Inaugural preparations ===
In June 2025, Mal Meninga was named as the inaugural coach of the Perth Bears for the 2027 and 2028 NRL seasons, with the immediate focus of promoting the club and building the team roster. Ben Gardiner signed a five-year contract, initially as assistant coach and then as head coach from 2029 onwards.

In September 2025, Tier-2 Queensland Cup side the Brisbane Tigers and British Super League team the Catalans Dragons in France agreed to act as feeder clubs to the new Perth NRL side.

Budget Direct was announced as the team's first major sponsor. On 1 December, New Balance was named as both the on-field and off-field apparel supplier. Within two weeks, Cash Converters — a major backer for the private "Western Bears" bid that collapsed in late 2024 — was announced as the major jersey sponsor.

In April 2026, the Perth Bears "Tracks" Academy at the Western Australian Institute of Sport was launched to source and develop local junior talent. Also in April, head of football David Sharpe left the club. In October, Perth Bears CEO Anthony De Ceglie quit before the club's inaugural pre-season training commenced; no reason was released publicly. In November, Tony Rea was appointed as CEO. Later that month, Ben McClellan left the Perth Bears after five months as head of media and communications.

==== Anti-tampering breach ====
On 12 June 2026, the Perth Bears and their head coach Mal Meninga were fined a combined $40,000 for breaching the NRL’s anti-tampering rules. The fine was issued after Meninga made premature media comments regarding the potential recruitment of players contracted to other clubs.

=== First NRL matches ===
The Perth Bears had hoped to play their first-ever match at North Sydney Oval, but the venue was unavailable due to a dispute with Cricket NSW over the cost of removing and reinstalling the cricket pitch.` Consequently, the Perth Bears' actual first NRL match will be against the Parramatta Eels in the 2027 NRL Pre-season Challenge at Eric Tweedale Stadium in Merrylands, New South Wales, on Sunday 14 February 2027, followed by a second fixture against the Cronulla-Sutherland Sharks at Endeavour Field (Ocean Protect Stadium) in Woolooware, New South Wales, on Saturday 20 February.

The Perth Bears' first NRL competition match will be played against the Manly-Warringah Sea Eagles, traditional rivals of the North Sydney Bears, at Perth Stadium (Optus Stadium) in Western Australia on Sunday 7 March 2027. Kick-off is scheduled for 1:05 pm (AWST UTC+08:00), 4:05 pm (AEDT, UTC+11:00).

== Kit manufacturer and sponsors ==
Year	Kit manufacturer	Major sponsor	Back top sponsor	Sleeve sponsor	Back bottom sponsor	Chest sponsor
2027	New Balance	Cash Converters	Penrite	Budget Direct	Atlas	XFM
2028	New Balance	-	-	-	-	-

== Logo and colours ==
Perth Bears inaugural season 2027 home game jersey

The Perth Bears logo was created by a North Sydney Bears supporter. It depicts a roaring bear in the red and black colours of North Sydney, which the Perth Bears have adopted as their primary colours. The Perth Bears' inaugural home jersey for 2027 has red and black hoops inspired by North Sydney.

== Stadium ==
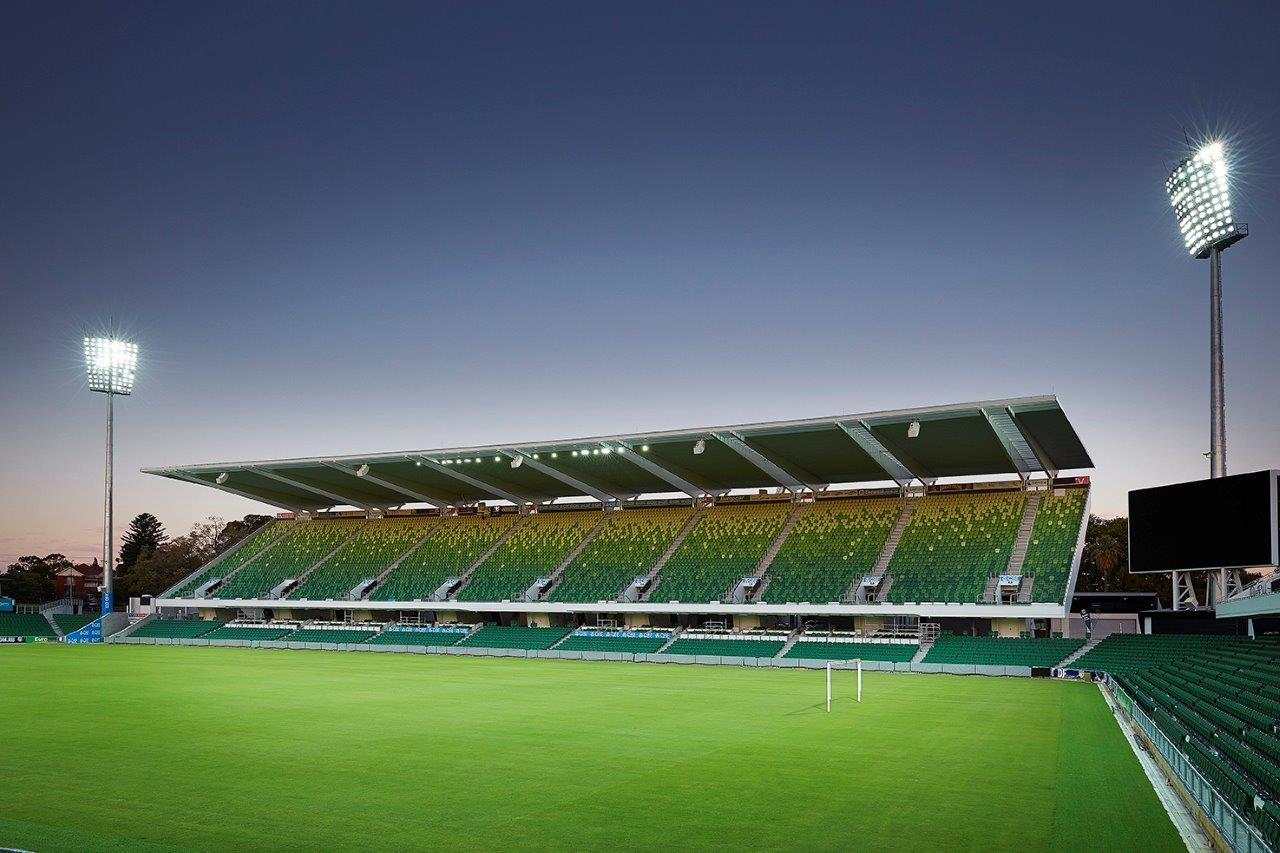
Perth Rectangular Stadium (HBF Park), the planned primary home ground of the Perth Bears from 2027.

Most Perth Bears home games from 2027 onwards are planned for Perth Rectangular Stadium (HBF Park), also used by soccer's Perth Glory and rugby union's Western Force. In August 2024, the government of Western Australia pledged a $300 million grant to further upgrade HBF Park if an NRL licence was granted to a Perth team.

Due to the club's North Sydney Bears heritage, the Perth Bears may play one NRL home game each year at one of North Sydney Oval, Central Coast Stadium or the Sydney Football Stadium. This match is proposed to be against the Manly-Warringah Sea Eagles, North Sydney's former NRL rivals. If North Sydney Oval is being used for cricket, the proposed Bears match may be transferred to Central Coast Stadium, Gosford, which was built in 1999 with the intention of being a home ground of the North Sydney Bears from 2000.

That reflects a wider issue: North Sydney Oval is not considered fit for regular-season matches. Ahead of the Perth Bears' inaugural season in 2027, the NRL had hoped to stage a pre-season game there, but as of November 2026 that had been thwarted by cricket, with Cricket NSW, which leases the ground in summer, estimating it would cost $200,000 and take five weeks to remove and reinstate the pitch. Consequently, the venue allocated for the Perth Bears' first-ever NRL (pre-season) match on 14 February 2027 was Eric Tweedale Stadium in Western Sydney.

In contrast, Perth Stadium (sponsored as Optus Stadium) was selected for the Perth Bears' first regular-season match of the 2027 NRL season, against the Manly-Warringah Sea Eagles.

== Players ==
=== 2027 signings ===
List of inaugural signings, with player name, previous club, contract length, and announcement date shown
Player name	Previous club	Contract length	Date	Ref.
(Australia) Toby Sexton	Catalans Dragons	2 years	2 December 2025	
(England) Harry Newman	Leeds Rhinos	2 years	2 December 2025	
(Australia) Luke Smith	London Broncos	2 years	3 December 2025	
(Tanzania) Emarly Bitungane	London Broncos	2 years	3 December 2025	
(Australia) Liam Henry	Penrith Panthers	4 years	10 December 2025	
(Australia) Iszac Fa'asuamaleaui	Catalans Dragons	2 years	10 December 2025	
(Australia) Sean Russell	Parramatta Eels	4 years	24 December 2025	
(Australia) Josh Curran	Canterbury-Bankstown Bulldogs	3 years	7 January 2026	
(Australia) Tyran Wishart	Melbourne Storm	5 years	10 January 2026	
(Australia) Nick Meaney	Melbourne Storm	3 years	10 January 2026	
(Ireland) James McDonnell	Leeds Rhinos	2 years	12 January 2026	
(New Zealand) Chris Vea'ila	Cronulla-Sutherland Sharks	2 years	12 January 2026	
(Australia) Luke Laulilii	Wests Tigers	2 years	16 January 2026	
(New Zealand) Scott Sorensen	Penrith Panthers	2 years	25 February 2026	
(Tonga) Siosifa Talakai	Cronulla-Sutherland Sharks	3 years	27 February 2026	
(England) Mikołaj Olędzki	Leeds Rhinos	3 years	17 March 2026	
(New Zealand) Te Hurinui Twidle	Parramatta Eels	3 years	1 May 2026	
(Australia) Kit Laulilii	Wests Tigers	2 years	1 May 2026	
(Australia) Anmaron Gudgeon	North Sydney Bears	1 years	11 June 2026	
(New Zealand) Mason Barber	North Queensland Cowboys	3 years	12 June 2026	
(Australia) Mavrik Geyer	Wests Tigers	2 years	23 June 2026	
(Australia) Jasais Ah Kee	St George Illawarra Dragons	3 years	23 June 2026	
(Fiji) Jope Raque	Canterbury-Bankstown Bulldogs	2 years	23 July 2026	
(Australia) Gehamat Shibasaki	Brisbane Broncos	2 years	23 July 2026	
(Australia) Tyson Smoothy	Wakefield Trinity	3 years	27 July 2026	
(Australia) Jack Cole	Penrith Panthers	3 years	28 July 2026	
(Australia) Niwhai Puru	Cronulla-Sutherland Sharks	2 years	28 July 2026	
(England) Morgan Smithies	Canberra Raiders	3 years	6 August 2026	
(Australia) Asher Chapman	Illawarra Steelers	3 years	18 August 2026	
(Poland) Zac Lipowīcz	Wakefield Trinity	2 years	19 August 2026	
(Australia) Corey Horsburgh	Canberra Raiders	3 years	23 August 2026	
(Australia) Cooper Watters	North Sydney Bears	2 years	27 August 2026	
(Fiji) Jonathan S'ua	Canterbury-Bankstown Bulldogs	3 years	2 September 2026	
(Australia) Zac Herdegen	North Queensland Cowboys	2 years	10 September 2026	
(Australia) Blake Wilson	Manly Warringah Sea Eagles	1 year	30 October 2026	
(Australia) Heath Mason	Wests Tigers	1 year	10 November 2026	

== Feeder clubs ==
Feeder-club alliances have been secured with the Brisbane Tigers in the Queensland Cup, the Catalans Dragons in the Super League, and the North Sydney Bears in the NSW Cup, who will remain in the second-tier competition.

Perth Bears' feeder clubs
Club name	Club competition
Brisbane Tigers	Queensland Cup
(France) Catalans Dragons	Super League
North Sydney Bears	NSW Cup

== See also ==
- List of sports clubs inspired by others
- NRL Western Australia
- Rugby league in Western Australia
- Sport in Western Australia
- Western Australia rugby league team
