= 2025 Canterbury-Bankstown Bulldogs season =

NRL rugby league season

- NRL Rank: 3rd
- Play-off result: SF
- 2025 record: Wins: 16; losses: 10
- Points scored: For: 578; against: 486

Team information
- CEO: Aaron Warburton
- Head Coach: Cameron Ciraldo
- Captain: Stephen Crichton
- Stadium: Accor Stadium; Belmore Sports Ground
- Avg. attendance: 30,688
- High attendance: 65,305 (Rd 5)
- Low attendance: 10,412 (Rd 12)

Top scorers
- Tries: Jacob Preston (12)
- Goals: Stephen Crichton (57)
- Points: Stephen Crichton (126)
← 2024	List of seasons	2026 →

The 2025 Canterbury-Bankstown Bulldogs season is the club's 91st season in the professional National Rugby League (NRL) football competition in Australia.

To mark 90 years since the club entered the then NSWRFL, the club unveiled a 90th anniversary logo on November 1, 2024 which will be worn on all playing jerseys in 2025.

It is Cameron Ciraldo's third season as head coach of the club.

== Pre-season challenge ==
The 2025 NRL pre-season was played in February, before the commencement of the regular season.

Round 1: 16 February 2025	Canterbury-Bankstown Bulldogs	20–14	Wests Tigers	Kogarah
17:30 AEDT	Tries: Todd 23'; Rinakama 38', 56'; Sua 64'; Goals: Taaffe 1/2 24'; Tia 1/25 66'	[Report Report]	Tries: Mason 32'; Faataape 42', 45'; Goals: Lobb 1/3 33'	Stadium: Nestrata Jubilee Stadium; Referee: Chris Butler

Round 2: 22 February 2025	Brisbane Broncos	30–14	Canterbury-Bankstown Bulldogs	Moreton Bay
17:30 AEDT	Tries: Reynolds 22'; Arthars 32'; Cobbo 39'; Hoeter 46'; Mariner 70'; Te Kura 75'; Goals: Reynolds 1/1 23'; Walsh 0/1; Madden 0/1; Smoothy 2/2 71', 75'	[Report Report]	Tries: Preston 58'; Rinakama 65'; Wilson 68'; Goals: Burton 1/3 59'; Sin bin: Curran (yellow card) 77' to 80'	Stadium: KAYO Stadium; Referee: Todd Smith

== Regular season ==
=== Results by round ===
Round	1	2	3	4	5	6	7	8	9	10	11	12	13	14	15	16	17	18	19	20	21	22	23	24	25	26	27
Ground	A	H	A	A	H	–	H	A	A	A	H	H	–	H	A	–	A	H	A	H	H	A	H	A	A	H	H
Result	W	W	W	W	W	B	W	L	W	W	W	L	B	W	W	B	L	L	W	W	W	L	W	L	L	W	L
Position	5	3	2	1	1	1	1	1	1	1	1	1	1	1	1	1	2	3	3	2	2	3	3	3	3	3	3
Points	2	4	6	8	10	12	14	14	16	18	20	20	22	24	26	28	28	28	30	32	34	34	36	36	36	38	38

Source: National Rugby League
A = Away; H = Home; B = Bye; W = Win; D = Draw; L = Loss

=== Matches ===
The league fixtures were announced on 13 November 2023.

Bye Win Draw Loss Fixtures

Round 1: 8 March 2025	St. George Illawarra Dragons	20–28	Canterbury-Bankstown Bulldogs	Kogarah
17:30 AEDT	Tries: Tuipulotu 16', 55', 72'; Liddle 67'; Goals: Holmes 2/4 18', 69'	Report	Tries: Montoya 13'; Wilson 30'; Tracey 34'; Tupouniua 45', 51'; Goals: Burton 4/5 32', 35', 46', 52'	Stadium: Nestrata Jubilee Stadium; Attendance: 16,211; Referee: Todd Smith

Round 2: 16 March 2025	Canterbury-Bankstown Bulldogs	40–24	Gold Coast Titans	Belmore
18:15 AEDT	Tries: Montoya 1'; Salmon 10'; Mahoney 14'; Curran 19'; Preston 40'; Mann 46'; Tracey 77'; Goals: Burton 3/4 12', 16', 21'; Crichton 3/3 42', 47', 77'	Report	Tries: Khan-Pereira 29', 37'; Fa'asuamaleaui 52'; S. Fifita 62'; Goals: Campbell 4/4 30', 38', 52', 63'	Stadium: Belmore Sports Ground; Attendance: 17,892; Referee: Peter Gough

Round 3: 23 March 2025	Parramatta Eels	8–16	Canterbury-Bankstown Bulldogs	Parramatta
16:05 AEDT	Tries: Penisini 18'; Addo-Carr 46'; Goals: Lomax 0/2	Report	Tries: Suluka-Fifita 4'; Xerri 25'; Wilson 33'; Goals: Crichton 2/4 6', 80 pen'	Stadium: CommBank Stadium; Attendance: 24,059; Referee: Wyatt Raymond

Round 4: 29 March 2025	Cronulla-Sutherland Sharks	6–20	Canterbury-Bankstown Bulldogs	Cronulla
19:35 AEDT	Tries: Iro 31'; Goals: Hynes 1/1 32'	Report	Tries: Preston 10'; Xerri 37', 62'; Crichton 45'; Goals: Crichton 2/4 46', 63'; Sin bin: Tupouniua (yellow card) 80' to 80'	Stadium: Sharks Stadium; Attendance: 11,703; Referee: Chris Butler

Round 5: 6 April 2025	Canterbury-Bankstown Bulldogs	20–0	Newcastle Knights	Sydney Olympic Park
18:15 AEST	Tries: Curran 41'; Todd 45'; Mann 70'; Goals: Crichton 4/4 3 pen', 43', 47', 71'	Report	Sin bin: Crossland (yellow card) 45' to 55'	Stadium: Accor Stadium; Attendance: 24,113; Referee: Ashley Klein

Round 6 (Bye)

Round 7: 18 April 2025	Canterbury-Bankstown Bulldogs	32–0	South Sydney Rabbitohs	Sydney Olympic Park
16:05 AEST	Tries: Curran 10'; King 25'; Tupouniua 33'; Preston 42'; Xerri 70'; Goals: Crichton 6/6 12', 18 pen', 27', 34', 44', 70'; Sin bin: Montoya (yellow card) 71' to 80'	Report	Sin bin: Aitken (yellow card) 17' to 27'	Stadium: Accor Stadium; Attendance: 65,305; Referee: Grant Atkins

Round 8: 24 April 2025	Brisbane Broncos	42–18	Canterbury-Bankstown Bulldogs	Brisbane
19:50 AEST	Tries: Willison 1'; Reynolds 8'; Mariner 11', 27'; Shibasaki 17'; Arthars 31'; Walters 79'; Goals: Reynolds 4/5 2', 13', 18', 32'; Cobbo 3/3 9', 79 pen', 79'; Sin bin: Mariner (yellow card) 72' to 80'	Report	Tries: Montoya 45'; Preston 56'; Xerri 71'; Goals: Crichton 3/3 47', 58', 72'; Sin bin: Curran (yellow card) 10' to 20'; Tupouniua (yellow card) 33' to 43'; Montoya (yellow card) 52' to 62'	Stadium: Suncorp Stadium; Attendance: 40,233; Referee: Gerard Sutton

Round 9: 4 May 2025	Gold Coast Titans	18–38	Canterbury-Bankstown Bulldogs	Brisbane
13:50 AEST	Tries: Fermor 19', 59'; Sami 30'; Khan-Pereira 65'; Goals: Kelly 1/4 65'; Sin bin: Kelly (yellow card) 33' to 43'; Randall (yellow card) 69' to 79'	Report	Tries: Kiraz 4', 44', 54'; Tracey 11'; Preston 48'; Mahoney 78'; Goals: Crichton 7/7 5', 13', 35 pen', 45', 50', 56', 79'; Sin bin: Preston (yellow card) 75' to 80'	Stadium: Suncorp Stadium; Attendance: 50,309; Referee: Todd Smith

Round 10: 10 May 2025	Canberra Raiders	20–32	Canterbury-Bankstown Bulldogs	Canberra
15:00 AEST	Tries: Hosking 3'; Weekes 17'; Savage 22'; Young 37'; Goals: Fogarty 2/4 4', 23'	Report	Tries: Crichton 44'; Salmon 46'; Montoya 50'; King 57'; Kikau 63'; Kiraz 71'; Goals: Crichton 4/6 45', 48', 58', 73'	Stadium: GIO Stadium; Attendance: 23,827; Referee: Adam Gee

Round 11: 16 May 2025	Canterbury-Bankstown Bulldogs	24–20	Sydney Roosters	Sydney Olympic Park
20:00 AEST	Tries: Kikau 49'; Sexton 56'; Xerri 62'; Burton 73'; Goals: Burton 4/4 50', 58', 64', 75'	Report	Tries: Nawaqanitawase 5', 67'; Collins 67'; Goals: Smith 4/4 7', 15 pen', 33', 68'	Stadium: Accor Stadium; Attendance: 30,166; Referee: Ashley Klein

Round 12: 22 May 2025	Canterbury-Bankstown Bulldogs	8–44	Dolphins	Sydney Olympic Park
19:50 AEST	Tries: Hopoi 31'; Goals: Burton 2/2 pen 9', 32'	Report	Tries: Isaako 11'; Bostock 38'; Graham 46'; Farnworth 63'; Molo 73'; Averillo 76'; Donoghoe 78'; Goals: Isaako 8/9 13', pen 27', 39', 47', 65', 74', 77', 79'	Stadium: Accor Stadium; Attendance: 10,412; Referee: Todd Smith

Round 13 (Bye)

Round 14: 9 June 2025	Canterbury-Bankstown Bulldogs	30–12	Parramatta Eels	Sydney Olympic Park
16:00 AEST	Tries: Burton 7'; Montoya 19'; Kikau 60'; Hayes 68'; Galvin 73'; Goals: Crichton 5/6 8', 21', 50 pen', 69', 74'; Sin bin: Kikau (yellow card) 35' to 45'	Report	Tries: Moses 11'; Walker 35'; Goals: Lomax 2/2 12', 36'	Stadium: Accor Stadium; Attendance: 59,878; Referee: Gerard Sutton

Round 15: 15 June 2025	South Sydney Rabbitohs	18–24	Canterbury-Bankstown Bulldogs	Sydney Olympic Park
16:05 AEST	Tries: Johnston 38'; Duncan 56'; Wighton 71'; Munro 78'; Goals: Humphreys 1/4 58'	Report	Tries: Sexton 6'; Montoya 12', 60'; Tracey 15'; Goals: Sexton 4/5 8', 14', 16', 77 pen' Sin bin: Turpin (yellow card) 62' to 72'	Stadium: Accor Stadium; Attendance: 23,871; Referee: Adam Gee

Round 16 (Bye)

Round 17: 26 June 2025	Penrith Panthers	8–6	Canterbury-Bankstown Bulldogs	Parramatta
19:50 AEDT	Tries: Cleary 53'; Goals: Edwards 2/3 27 pen', 55'	Report	Tries: Preston 32'; Goals: Crichton 1/1 34'	Stadium: CommBank Stadium; Attendance: 16,738; Referee: Grant Atkins

Round 18: 4 July 2025	Canterbury-Bankstown Bulldogs	18–22	Brisbane Broncos	Sydney Olympic Park
20:00 AEST	Tries: Montoya 13'; Burton 20'; Kikau 32'; Goals: Burton 3/4 14', 33', 44 pen'	Report	Tries: Karapani 60'; Hoeter 65'; Walters 70'; Piakura 73'; Goals: Reynolds 3/4 61', 72', 75'	Stadium: Accor Stadium; Attendance: 25,234; Referee: Todd Smith

Round 19: 12 July 2025	North Queensland Cowboys	8–12	Canterbury-Bankstown Bulldogs	Townsville
19:35 AEDT	Tries: Laybutt 15'; Goals: Drinkwater 2/2 16', 22 pen'	Report	Tries: Preston 35'; Rinakama 39'; Goals: Burton 2/2 37', 39'	Stadium: Queensland Country Bank Stadium; Attendance: 18,778; Referee: Wyatt Raymond

Round 20: 19 July 2025	Canterbury-Bankstown Bulldogs	20–18	St. George Illawarra Dragons	Sydney Olympic Park
17:30 AEST	Tries: Kiraz 6'; Galvin 22'; Mahoney 32'; Rinakama 77'; Goals: Crichton 2/4 23', 33'	Report	Tries: Sloan 16'; Suli 50'; Finau 54'; Goals: Flanagan 3/4 17', 40 pen', 55'	Stadium: Accor Stadium; Attendance: 30,115; Referee: Adam Gee

Round 21: 27 July 2025	Canterbury-Bankstown Bulldogs	42–4	Manly Warringah Sea Eagles	Moore Park
16:05 AEST	Tries: Hughes 13', 75'; Kiraz 29', 54'; Xerri 58', 64'; Tuala 72'; Goals: Crichton 7/7 14', 31', 55', 59', 65', 73', 76'	Report	Tries: Saab 37'; Goals: Garrick 0/1	Stadium: Allianz Stadium; Attendance: 25,801; Referee: Ashley Klein

Round 22: 3 August 2025	Wests Tigers	28–14	Canterbury-Bankstown Bulldogs	Parramatta
14:00 AEST	Tries: Skelton 13', 29'; Bula 18'; Doueihi 32'; Fainu 70'; Goals: Doueihi 4/6 14', 34', 64 pen', 71'; Sin bin: Seyfarth (yellow card) 59' to 69'	Report	Tries: Preston 36'; Kiraz 51'; Curran 78'; Goals: Crichton 1/3 78'	Stadium: CommBank Stadium; Attendance: 17,432; Referee: Wyatt Raymond

Round 23: 9 August 2025	Canterbury-Bankstown Bulldogs	32–14	New Zealand Warriors	Sydney Olympic Park
19:35 AEST	Tries: Kikau 21'; Rinakama 31'; Tuala 38', 67'; Crichton 67'; Goals: Crichton 6/7 6 pen', 16 pen', 32', 39', 57 pen', 69'; Burton 0/1	Report	Tries: Healey 54'; Tuivasa-Sheck 77'; Goals: Pompey 3/3 2 pen', 55', 78'	Stadium: Accor Stadium; Attendance: 25,377; Referee: Adam Gee

Round 24: 15 August 2025	Sydney Roosters	32–12	Canterbury-Bankstown Bulldogs	Moore Park
20:00 AEST	Tries: Tupou 15', 54', 77'; Whyte 36', 45'; Goals: Walker 6/6 16', 26 pen', 38', 47', 55', 78'	Report	Tries: Tuala 10'; Burton 62'; Goals: Crichton 2/2 12', 63'	Stadium: Allianz Stadium; Attendance: 31,399; Referee: Grant Atkins

Round 25: 22 August 2025	Melbourne Storm	20–14	Canterbury-Bankstown Bulldogs	Melbourne
20:00 AEST	Tries: Katoa 15'; Papenhuyzen 24'; Coates 50'; Goals: Meaney 4/4 17', 26', 52', 64 pen' Sin bin: Grant (yellow card) 45' to 55'	Report	Tries: Hayward 43'; Kikau 56'; Kiraz 70'; Goals: Crichton 1/3 44'	Stadium: AAMI Park; Attendance: 25,693; Referee: Adam Gee

Round 26: 28 August 2025	Canterbury-Bankstown Bulldogs	28–4	Penrith Panthers	Sydney Olympic Park
19:50 AEST	Tries: Galvin 16'; Preston 33', 47', 67'; Burton 54'; Goals: Crichton 1/2 55'; Burton 3/3 34', 48', 68'	Report	Tries: Alamoti 57'; Goals: Alamoti 0/1; Sin bin: Lipowicz (yellow card) 22' to 32'	Stadium: Accor Stadium; Attendance: 25,597; Referee: Wyatt Raymond

Round 27: 6 September 2025	Canterbury-Bankstown Bulldogs	6-24	Cronulla-Sutherland Sharks	Sydney Olympic Park
19:35 AEST	Tries: Tuala 45'; Goals: Burton 1/1 47'	Report	Tries: Burns 25'; Ramien 31'; Brailey 37'; Atkinson 57'; Goals: Hynes 4/4 26', 32', 39', 59'	Stadium: Accor Stadium; Attendance: 30,368; Referee: Ashley Klein

== Finals series ==
=== Matches ===
Win Draw Loss Fixtures

QEF: 12 September 2025	Melbourne Storm	26–18		Melbourne
19:50 AEST	Tries: Katoa 3'; Lisati 34'; Wishart 65'; Warbrick 76'; Goals: Meaney 3/3 4', 35', 23 pen' Pezet 2/2 67', 77'	Report	Tries: Sexton 20'; Kiraz 29'; Burton 57'; Goals: Burton 3/3 21', 31', 59'	Stadium: AAMI Park; Attendance: 22,117; Referee: Adam Gee

SF: 21 September 2025	Canterbury-Bankstown Bulldogs	26-46	Penrith Panthers	Sydney Olympic Park
16:05 AEST	Tries: Galvin 16'; Preston 56'; Xerri 61'; Kiraz 77'; Goals: Burton 5/5 2 pen', 17', 57', 62', 77'	Report	Tries: To'o 7', 28'; Alamoti 11', 53', 69'; Cleary 21'; Henry 32'; Papali'i 38'; Goals: Cleary 7/8 8', 13', 22', 30', 34', 39', 71'	Stadium: Accor Stadium; Attendance: 56,872; Referee: Ashley Klein

=== Ladder ===
Pos	Team	Pld	W	D	L	B	PF	PA	PD	Pts	Qualification
1	Canberra Raiders	24	19	0	5	3	654	506	+148	44	Advance to finals series
2	Melbourne Storm	24	17	0	7	3	671	459	+212	40	Advance to finals series
3	Canterbury-Bankstown Bulldogs	24	16	0	8	3	534	414	+120	38	Advance to finals series
4	Brisbane Broncos (P)	24	15	0	9	3	680	508	+172	36	Advance to finals series
5	Cronulla-Sutherland Sharks	24	15	0	9	3	599	490	+109	36	Advance to finals series
6	New Zealand Warriors	24	14	0	10	3	517	496	+21	34	Advance to finals series
7	Penrith Panthers	24	13	1	10	3	576	469	+107	33	Advance to finals series
8	Sydney Roosters	24	13	0	11	3	653	521	+132	32	Advance to finals series
9	Dolphins	24	12	0	12	3	721	596	+125	30	
10	Manly Warringah Sea Eagles	24	12	0	12	3	555	534	+21	30	
11	Parramatta Eels	24	10	0	14	3	502	578	−76	26	
12	North Queensland Cowboys	24	9	1	14	3	538	684	−146	25	
13	Wests Tigers	24	9	0	15	3	477	612	−135	24	
14	South Sydney Rabbitohs	24	9	0	15	3	427	608	−181	24	
15	St. George Illawarra Dragons	24	8	0	16	3	498	628	−130	22	
16	Gold Coast Titans	24	6	0	18	3	520	719	−199	18	
17	Newcastle Knights	24	6	0	18	3	338	638	−300	18	

Source: National Rugby League
(P) Premiers

== 2025 squad ==
Canterbury Bulldogs 2025 squad
Top 30 squad - 2025 NRL season			Supplementary list	Coaching staff
Tom Amone – PR; Matt Burton – FE, CE; Stephen Crichton (c) – CE, FB; Joshua Curran – PR, LK, SR; Harry Hayes – SR; Bailey Hayward – LK; Sam Hughes – PR; Drew Hutchison – HB, FE, CE; Viliame Kikau – SR; Max King – PR	Jacob Kiraz – WG, CE, FB; Reed Mahoney – HK; Kurt Mann – LK; Marcelo Montoya – WG, CE; Kurtis Morrin – LK, PR; Karl Oloapu – FE, HB; Jacob Preston – SR; Jaeman Salmon – SR, LK; Toby Sexton – HB, FE, HK; Daniel Suluka-Fifita – PR	Ryan Sutton – PR, LK; Blake Taaffe – FB; Jack Todd – LK; Connor Tracey – FB, WG; Enari Tuala – WG; Sitili Tupouniua – SR, CE; Jake Turpin – LK, HK; Blake Wilson – WG; Mitchell Woods – HB; Bronson Xerri – CE	Sosaia Alatini – SR; Lipoi Hopoi – LK, PR, SR; Joseph O'Neill – HB; Logan Spinks – SR; Jonathan Sua – WG; Patrick Young – HK; Extended squad: Danny Gabrael – CE; AJ Jones – LK; Reuben Moyle – HK; Luke Smith – SR; Cassius Tia – HB; Jack Underhill – PR	Manager: Phil Gould (General Manager of Football); Head coach: Cameron Ciraldo; Assistant coaches: Chad Randall; Jason Taylor; Luke Vella (NRL Transition Coach); Mick Potter (NSW Cup Coach); Josh Jackson (Jersey Flegg Coach); Managers: Fred Ciraldo (team manager); Legend: (c) Captain(s); (vc) Vice-captain(s); Updated: 15 March 2026; Source(s): Bulldogs 2023

== See also ==
- 2025 Canterbury-Bankstown Bulldogs Women season
