= 2024 Canterbury-Bankstown Bulldogs season =

NRL rugby league season

- NRL Rank: 6th
- Play-off result: EF
- 2024 record: Wins: 14; losses: 11
- Points scored: For: 551; against: 457

Team information
- CEO: Aaron Warburton
- Head Coach: Cameron Ciraldo
- Captain: Stephen Crichton
- Stadium: Accor Stadium; Belmore Sports Ground
- Avg. attendance: 19,245
- High attendance: 50,714 (EF)
- Low attendance: 6,146 (Rd 24)

Top scorers
- Tries: Jacob Kiraz (12)
- Goals: Matt Burton (74)
- Points: Matt Burton (187)
← 2023	List of seasons	2025 →

The 2024 Canterbury-Bankstown Bulldogs season was the club's 90th season in the professional National Rugby League (NRL) football competition in Australia.

It was Cameron Ciraldo's second season as head coach of the club.

== Pre-season challenge ==
The 2024 NRL pre-season was played in February, before the commencement of the regular season.

Round 1: 15 February 2024	Canterbury-Bankstown Bulldogs	24–12	Melbourne Storm	Belmore
19:00 AEDT	Tries: Clark 4'; Wilson 23'; Skelton 53'; Xerri 65'; Sua 72'; Goals: Burton 1/2 6'; Sexton 1/3 67'; Field goals: Sexton 0/1 (2 pt)	[Report Report]	Tries: Ieremia 12'; Papenhuyzen 39'; Goals: Pezet 2/2 13', 39'	Stadium: Belmore Sports Ground; Referee: Wyatt Raymond

Round 2: 23 February 2024	Cronulla Sutherland Sharks	12–6	Canterbury-Bankstown Bulldogs	Belmore
20:00 AEDT	Tries: Wilton 12'; Vea'ila 72'; Goals: Trindall 2/2 14', 74'; Sin bin: Nikora (yellow card) 29' to 39'	[Report Report]	Tries: Preston 32'; Goals: Burton 1/1 33'	Stadium: Belmore Sports Ground; Referee: Adam Gee

== Regular season ==
=== Results by round ===
Round	1	2	3	4	5	6	7	8	9	10	11	12	13	14	15	16	17	18	19	20	21	22	23	24	25	26	27
Ground	A	A	H	A	H	A	H	–	H	A	A	H	A	H	–	A	H	H	–	A	A	H	A	H	A	H	H
Result	L	L	W	L	W	L	W	B	W	L	L	W	W	W	B	L	W	W	B	L	W	W	W	W	W	L	L
Position	15	17	12	14	13	15	12	8	8	9	11	10	9	7	6	6	5	5	5	6	5	5	5	5	5	5	6
Points	0	0	2	2	4	4	6	8	10	10	10	12	14	16	18	18	20	22	24	24	26	28	30	32	34	34	34

Source: National Rugby League
A = Away; H = Home; B = Bye; W = Win; D = Draw; L = Loss

=== Matches ===
The league fixtures were announced on 13 November 2023.

Win Draw Loss Fixtures

Round 1: 9 March 2024	Parramatta Eels	26–8	Canterbury-Bankstown Bulldogs	Parramatta
17:30 AEDT	Tries: Harper 12'; Cartwright 36', 50'; Simonsson 76'; Goals: Moses 1/1 13'; Gutherson 4/4 26 pen', 37', 51', 77'	[Report Report]	Tries: Wilson 65'; Crichton 69'; Goals: Burton 0/2	Stadium: CommBank Stadium; Attendance: 29,171; Referee: Grant Atkins

Round 2: 15 March 2024	Cronulla-Sutherland Sharks	25–6	Canterbury-Bankstown Bulldogs	Cronulla
18:00 AEDT	Tries: Trindall 23'; Katoa 55'; Mulitalo 64'; Wilton 74'; Goals: Hynes 4/4 24', 57', 69', 75'; Field goals: Hynes 79'; Sin bin: Nikora (yellow card) 5' to 15'	[Report Report]	Tries: Wilson 12'; Goals: Burton 1/1 14'	Stadium: PointsBet Stadium; Attendance: 12,928; Referee: Ziggy Przeklasa-Adamski

Round 3: 23 March 2024	Canterbury-Bankstown Bulldogs	32–0	Gold Coast Titans	Belmore
15:00 AEDT	Tries: Preston 17'; Kikau 29'; Mahoney 46'; Kiraz 53'; Tracey 60'; Taaffe 62'; Goals: Burton 4/6 19', 31', 47', 64'	[Report Report]		Stadium: Belmore Sports Ground; Attendance: 12,037; Referee: Todd Smith

Round 4: 29 March 2024	South Sydney Rabbitohs	20–16	Canterbury-Bankstown Bulldogs	Sydney Olympic Park
16:05 AEDT	Tries: Burgess 9'; Wighton 13', 44'; Goals: L. Mitchell 4/5 10', 45', 52 pen', 75 pen'	[Report Report]	Tries: Burton 24'; Tracey 33', 79'; Goals: Burton 2/3 26', 35'; Sin bin: Morrin (yellow card) 50' to 60'	Stadium: Accor Stadium; Attendance: 35,275; Referee: Gerard Sutton

Round 5: 5 April 2024	Canterbury-Bankstown Bulldogs	30–26	Sydney Roosters	Sydney Olympic Park
18:00 AEST	Tries: Taaffe 0'; Burton 8', 14', 64'; Hughes 39'; Goals: Burton 5/6 27 pen', 2', 9', 15', 39'	[Report Report]	Tries: E. Butcher 46', 54'; Whyte 50'; Manu 57'; Tupou 74'; Goals: Sua'ali'i 2/2 47', 75'; Keary 1/3 51'; Sin bin: Radley (yellow card) 72' to 80'; Sent off: Young (red card) 26'	Stadium: Accor Stadium; Attendance: 7,169; Referee: Grant Atkins

Round 6: 12 April 2024	Melbourne Storm	16–14	Canterbury-Bankstown Bulldogs	Melbourne
18:00 AEST	Tries: Papenhuyzen 2'; Smith 22'; Blore 74'; Goals: Meaney 2/3 3', 75'; Sin bin: Papenhuyzen (yellow card) 55' to 65'	[Report Report]	Tries: Addo-Carr 47', 56', 61'; Goals: Burton 1/3 49'; Sin bin: Hughes (yellow card) 53' to 63'	Stadium: AAMI Park; Attendance: 16,065; Referee: Wyatt Raymond

Round 7: 21 April 2024	Canterbury-Bankstown Bulldogs	36–12	Newcastle Knights	Sydney Olympic Park
14:00 AEST	Tries: Hughes 4'; Kiraz 21'; Xerri 34'; Hayward 48'; Addo-Carr 58'; Crichton 71'; Goals: Burton 6/6 6', 23', 35', 50', 59', 73'; Sin bin: Mahoney (yellow card) 76' to 80'	[Report Report]	Tries: Lucas 30'; Best 79'; Goals: Ponga 1/1 32'; Hastings 1/1 79'; Sin bin: Hetherington (yellow card) 76' to 80'	Stadium: Accor Stadium; Attendance: 17,784; Referee: Peter Gough

Round 8 (Bye for Canterbury-Bankstown Bulldogs)

Round 9: 4 May 2024	Canterbury-Bankstown Bulldogs	22–14	Wests Tigers	Sydney Olympic Park
15:00 AEST	Tries: Mann 22'; Curran 44'; Xerri 56'; Goals: Burton 5/5 24', 45', 49 pen', 53 pen', 57'	[Report Report]	Tries: Staines 15'; Pole 26'; Goals: Sezer 3/3 13 pen', 16', 28'; Sin bin: Klemmer (yellow card) 73' to 80'; Seyfarth (yellow card) 73' to 80'	Stadium: Accor Stadium; Attendance: 17,068; Referee: Kasey Badger

Round 10: 10 May 2024	Penrith Panthers	16–10	Canterbury-Bankstown Bulldogs	Penrith
18:00 AEST	Tries: Garner 25'; To'o 37'; Goals: Cleary 1/1 26'; Edwards 3/3 38', 52 pen', 75 pen'	[Report Report]	Tries: Burton 68'; Kiraz 79'; Goals: Burton 1/2 80'	Stadium: BlueBet Stadium; Attendance: 21,525; Referee: Liam Kennedy

Round 11: 17 May 2024	Canberra Raiders	24–20	Canterbury-Bankstown Bulldogs	Brisbane
18:00 AEST	Tries: Savage 2'; Kris 19'; Young 51', 60'; Goals: Rapana 4/4 4', 20', 52', 62'; Sin bin: Rapana (yellow card) 35' to 45'; Papali'i (yellow card) 39' to 49'	[Report Report]	Tries: Preston 30'; Crichton 36'; Burton 39'; Kiraz 41'; Goals: Burton 2/4 32', 42'	Stadium: Suncorp Stadium; Attendance: 50,971; Referee: Ashley Klein

Round 12: 23 May 2024	Canterbury-Bankstown Bulldogs	44–12	St. George Illawarra Dragons	Sydney Olympic Park
19:50 AEST	Tries: Burton 8', 67'; Salmon 46', 52'; Kiraz 56', 78'; Preston 60'; Crichton 70'; Goals: Burton 6/9 20', 46', 53', 58', 63 pen', 71'	[Report Report]	Tries: Suli 12'; Liddle 31'; Goals: Lomax 2/2 14', 33'; Sin bin: Lomax (yellow card) 63' to 73'	Stadium: Accor Stadium; Attendance: 15,442; Referee: Adam Gee

Round 13: 31 May 2024	Newcastle Knights	2–32	Canterbury-Bankstown Bulldogs	Newcastle
20:00 AEST	Goals: Hastings 1/1 6 pen' Sin bin: J. Saifiti (yellow card) 78' to 80'	[Report Report]	Tries: Addo-Carr 14', 27'; Preston 47', 67'; Curran 61'; Xerri 73'; Goals: Sexton 4/6 16', 68', 74', 79 pen' Hayward 0/1; Sin bin: Tracey (yellow card) 6' to 16'; Sexton (yellow card) 53' to 63'	Stadium: McDonald Jones Stadium; Attendance: 21,204; Referee: Grant Atkins

Round 14: 10 June 2024	Canterbury-Bankstown Bulldogs	22–18	Parramatta Eels	Sydney Olympic Park
16:00 AEST	Tries: Crichton 12', 67'; Wilson 17', 74'; Goals: Burton 3/4 19', 67', 75'; Sin bin: Mann (yellow card) 55' to 65'	[Report Report]	Tries: Talagi 6'; Penisini 33'; Tuilagi 44'; Goals: Moses 3/3 7', 34', 46'	Stadium: Accor Stadium; Attendance: 45,496; Referee: Peter Gough

Round 15 (Bye for Canterbury-Bankstown Bulldogs)

Round 16: 22 June 2024	Sydney Roosters	26–8	Canterbury-Bankstown Bulldogs	Gosford
17:30 AEST	Tries: Young 21'; N. Butcher 33'; May 41'; Steep 65'; Goals: Walker 5/5 5 pen', 23', 34', 43', 66'; Sin bin: Walker (yellow card) 78' to 80'; Sent off: Pauga (red card) 72'	[Report Report]	Tries: Salmon 17'; Skelton 46'; Goals: Burton 0/2	Stadium: Industree Group Stadium; Attendance: 16,868; Referee: Grant Atkins

Round 17: 28 June 2024	Canterbury-Bankstown Bulldogs	15–14 (g.p.)	Cronulla-Sutherland Sharks	Sydney Olympic Park
20:00 AEST	Tries: Kikau 2'; Mahoney 13'; Goals: Burton 3/3 4', 14', 76 pen' Field goals: Burton 83'	[Report Report]	Tries: Nikora 21'; Katoa 52'; Trindall 61'; Goals: Hynes 1/3 22'	Stadium: Accor Stadium; Attendance: 15,765; Referee: Gerard Sutton

Round 18: 6 July 2024	Canterbury-Bankstown Bulldogs	13–12 (g.p.)	New Zealand Warriors	Sydney Olympic Park
15:00 AEST	Tries: Xerri 19'; Kikau 54'; Goals: Burton 2/2 21', 55'; Field goals: Burton 87'	[Report Report]	Tries: Watene-Zelezniak 22'; Montoya 27'; Goals: Pompey 2/3 29', 40 pen'	Stadium: Accor Stadium; Attendance: 27,223; Referee: Chris Butler

Round 19 (Bye for Canterbury-Bankstown Bulldogs)

Round 20: 21 July 2024	North Queensland Cowboys	20–18	Canterbury-Bankstown Bulldogs	Townsville
18:15 AEST	Tries: Luki 5', 43'; Purdue 70'; Goals: Holmes 4/4 6', 25 pen', 45', 72'	[Report Report]	Tries: Curran 13'; Xerri 29'; Kiraz 55'; Goals: Burton 3/5 15', 21 pen', 63 pen' Sin bin: Wilson (yellow card) 42' to 52'	Stadium: Queensland Country Bank Stadium; Attendance: 16,376; Referee: Gerard Sutton

Round 21: 27 July 2024	Brisbane Broncos	16–41	Canterbury-Bankstown Bulldogs	Brisbane
17:00 AEST	Tries: Walsh 29'; Staggs 39'; Taupau 75'; Goals: Reynolds 2/3 40', 75'	[Report Report]	Tries: Xerri 9'; Tracey 16', 57', 70'; Skelton 24'; Kikau 41'; Kiraz 61'; Goals: Burton 6/7 11', 17', 43', 59', 63', 71'; Field goals: Burton 79'	Stadium: Suncorp Stadium; Attendance: 42,213; Referee: Grant Atkins

Round 22: 4 August 2024	Canterbury-Bankstown Bulldogs	22–18	Canberra Raiders	Belmore
16:05 AEST	Tries: Crichton 16', 45'; Addo-Carr 52', 68'; Goals: Burton 3/5 26 pen', 53', 69'	[Report Report]	Tries: Mooney 21'; Timoko 58'; Rapana 72'; Goals: Fogarty 3/3 22', 60', 73'	Stadium: Belmore Sports Ground; Attendance: 18,110; Referee: Ashley Klein

Round 23: 10 August 2024	St. George Illawarra Dragons	10–28	Canterbury-Bankstown Bulldogs	Kogarah
19:35 AEST	Tries: Lomax 22'; Sloan 36'; Goals: Lomax 1/2 23'	[Report Report]	Tries: Burton 3'; Xerri 25', 29'; Mann 58'; Goals: Burton 6/6 4', 13 pen', 27', 30', 59', 74 pen'	Stadium: Nestrata Jubilee Stadium; Attendance: 18,416; Referee: Gerard Sutton

Round 24: 17 August 2024	Canterbury-Bankstown Bulldogs	30–10	Dolphins	Bundaberg
15:00 AEST (UTC+10:00)	Tries: Kiraz 10', 27'; Addo-Carr 35'; Xerri 66'; Tracey 68'; Goals: Burton 5/7 15 pen', 36', 49 pen', 67', 69'	[Report Report]	Tries: Isaako 24'; Averillo 38'; Goals: Isaako 1/2 39'	Stadium: Salter Oval; Attendance: 6,148; Referee: Adam Gee

Round 25: 23 August 2024	New Zealand Warriors	18–34	Canterbury-Bankstown Bulldogs	Auckland
20:00 NZST	Tries: Montoya 9'; Capewell 13'; Egan 38'; Goals: Johnson 3/3 10', 15', 40'	[Report Report]	Tries: Xerri 26'; Crichton 29'; Morrin 34'; Hayes 53'; Addo-Carr 61'; Kiraz 77'; Goals: Burton 5/6 30', 35', 55', 63', 78'	Stadium: Shaun Johnson Stadium; Attendance: 24,295; Referee: Wyatt Raymond

Round 26: 30 August 2024	Canterbury-Bankstown Bulldogs	22–34	Manly Warringah Sea Eagles	Sydney Olympic Park
18:00 AEST	Tries: Mahoney 1', 79'; Addo-Carr 25'; Preston 68'; Goals: Burton 2/2 2', 27'; Sexton 1/2 79'	[Report Report]	Tries: Saab 8'; T. Trbojevic 12'; Hopoate 18', 48'; Lawton 31'; Garrick 51'; Goals: Garrick 5/6 9', 13', 19', 33', 50'	Stadium: Accor Stadium; Attendance: 35,502; Referee: Ashley Klein

Round 27: 7 September 2024	Canterbury-Bankstown Bulldogs	6–44	North Queensland Cowboys	Sydney Olympic Park
17:30 AEST	Tries: Sexton 61'; Goals: Crichton 1/1 62'	[Report Report]	Tries: Feldt 18', 55'; Luki 28'; Drinkwater 39'; Holmes 59'; Taulagi 69', 73'; Goals: Holmes 8/8 12 pen', 20', 30', 39', 56', 60', 70', 74'	Stadium: Accor Stadium; Attendance: 32,437; Referee: Gerard Sutton

== Finals series ==
=== Matches ===
Win Draw Loss Fixtures

QEF: 15 September 2024	Canterbury-Bankstown Bulldogs	22–24	Manly Warringah Sea Eagles	Sydney Olympic Park
16:05 AEST	Tries: Kiraz 6'; Kikau 18'; Crichton 23'; Skelton 46'; Goals: Burton 3/4 20', 25', 47'	[Report Report]	Tries: Talau 14'; Bullemor 36'; Cherry-Evans 55'; Koula 71'; Goals: Garrick 4/4 15', 37', 57', 72'	Stadium: Accor Stadium; Attendance: 50,714; Referee: Grant Atkins

=== Ladder ===
Pos	Team	Pld	W	D	L	B	PF	PA	PD	Pts	Qualification
1	Melbourne Storm	24	19	0	5	3	692	449	+243	44	Advance to finals series
2	Penrith Panthers (P)	24	17	0	7	3	580	394	+186	40	Advance to finals series
3	Sydney Roosters	24	16	0	8	3	738	463	+275	38	Advance to finals series
4	Cronulla-Sutherland Sharks	24	16	0	8	3	653	431	+222	38	Advance to finals series
5	North Queensland Cowboys	24	15	0	9	3	657	568	+89	36	Advance to finals series
6	Canterbury-Bankstown Bulldogs	24	14	0	10	3	529	433	+96	34	Advance to finals series
7	Manly Warringah Sea Eagles	24	13	1	10	3	634	521	+113	33	Advance to finals series
8	Newcastle Knights	24	12	0	12	3	470	510	−40	30	Advance to finals series
9	Canberra Raiders	24	12	0	12	3	474	601	−127	30	
10	Dolphins	24	11	0	13	3	577	578	−1	28	
11	St. George Illawarra Dragons	24	11	0	13	3	508	634	−126	28	
12	Brisbane Broncos	24	10	0	14	3	537	607	−70	26	
13	New Zealand Warriors	24	9	1	14	3	512	574	−62	25	
14	Gold Coast Titans	24	8	0	16	3	488	656	−168	22	
15	Parramatta Eels	24	7	0	17	3	561	716	−155	20	
16	South Sydney Rabbitohs	24	7	0	17	3	494	682	−188	20	
17	Wests Tigers	24	6	0	18	3	463	750	−287	18	

Source: National Rugby League
(P) Premiers

== 2024 squad ==
Canterbury Bulldogs 2024 squad
Top 30 squad - 2024 NRL season			Supplementary list	Coaching staff
Josh Addo-Carr – WG; Matt Burton – FE, CE; Stephen Crichton (c) – CE, FB; Joshua Curran – PR, LK, SR; Sam Hughes – PR; Drew Hutchison – HB, FE, CE; Kitione Kautoga – SR; Viliame Kikau – SR; Max King – PR; Jacob Kiraz – WG, CE, FB	Liam Knight – PR, LK; Reed Mahoney – HK; Kurt Mann – LK; Kurtis Morrin – LK, PR; Karl Oloapu – FE, HB; Chris Patolo – PR; Hayze Perham – CE, FB, WG, FE; Jacob Preston – SR; Jaeman Salmon – SR, LK; Jordan Samrani – CE, SR	Toby Sexton – HB, FE, HK; Jeral Skelton – WG; Daniel Suluka-Fifita – PR; Ryan Sutton – PR, LK; Blake Taaffe – FB, HB, FE; Connor Tracey – FB, WG; Jake Turpin – LK, HK; Blake Wilson – WG; Bronson Xerri – CE	Poasa Faamausili – PR, LK; Bailey Hayward – LK; Joseph O'Neill – HB, FE; Joash Papalii – FB; Extended squad: Eli Clark – WG, CE; Harry Hayes – SR; Lipoi Hopoi – LK, PR, SR; Jack Todd – LK, PR	Manager: Phil Gould (General Manager of Football); Head coach: Cameron Ciraldo; Assistant coaches: Chad Randall; Jason Taylor; Luke Vella (NRL Transition Coach); Mick Potter (NSW Cup Coach); Josh Jackson (Jersey Flegg Coach); Managers: Fred Ciraldo (Team Manager); Legend: (c) Captain(s); (vc) Vice-captain(s); Updated: 15 September 2024; Source(s): Bulldogs 2024
