= 2023 Canterbury-Bankstown Bulldogs season =

NRL rugby league season

- NRL Rank: 15th
- Play-off result: Missed
- 2023 record: Wins: 7; losses: 17
- Points scored: For: 438; against: 769

Team information
- CEO: Aaron Warburton
- Head Coach: Cameron Ciraldo
- Captain: Raymond Faitala-Mariner (Club Captain) Matt Burton (Game day Co-Captain) Reed Mahoney (Game day Co-Captain)
- Stadium: Accor Stadium; Belmore Sports Ground
- Avg. attendance: 18,348
- High attendance: 41,462
- Low attendance: 5,130

Top scorers
- Tries: Jake Averillo (12)
- Goals: Matt Burton (60)
- Points: Matt Burton (138)
← 2022	List of seasons	2024 →

The 2023 Canterbury-Bankstown Bulldogs season is the 89th in the club's history. They will compete in the National Rugby League's 2023 Telstra Premiership. Cameron Ciraldo takes over as head coach of the team for his first season following the departure of Trent Barrett part way through the previous season.

== Fixtures ==
The club started 2023 with two pre-season trial matches against the Canberra Raiders and the Cronulla Sutherland Sharks in February before kicking off the regular season away to the Manly Warringah Sea Eagles in round one.

=== Regular season ===
Round	Home	Score	Away	Match Information
Round	Home	Score	Away	Date and Time	Venue	Crowd
1	Manly-Warringah Sea Eagles	31–6	Canterbury Bankstown Bulldogs	Sun 4 Mar, 3:00pm AEDT	4 Pine Park	17,217
2	Melbourne Storm	12–26	Canterbury Bankstown Bulldogs	Sat 11 Mar 7:35pm AEDT	AAMI Park	17,248
3	Canterbury Bankstown Bulldogs	26–22	Wests Tigers	Sun 19 Mar 4:05pm AEDT	Belmore Sports Ground	16,404
4	New Zealand Warriors	16–14	Canterbury Bankstown Bulldogs	Sun 26 Mar 2:00pm AEDT	Mount Smart Stadium	18,595
5	Canterbury Bankstown Bulldogs	15–14	North Queensland Cowboys	Sun 2 Apr 6:15pm AEST	Accor Stadium	9,626
6	Canterbury Bankstown Bulldogs	16–50	South Sydney Rabbitohs	Fri 7 Apr 4:00pm AEST	Accor Stadium	35,211
7	Parramatta Eels	30–4	Canterbury Bankstown Bulldogs	Sun 16 Apr 4:05pm AEST	CommBank Stadium	26,755
8	Canterbury Bankstown Bulldogs	20–33	Cronulla Sutherland Sharks	Sat 22 Apr 5:30pm AEST	Accor Stadium	12,184
9	St George Illawarra Dragons	16–18	Canterbury Bankstown Bulldogs	Sun 30 Apr 4:05pm AEST	WIN Stadium	16,678
10	Canterbury Bankstown Bulldogs	30–34	Canberra Raiders	Fri 5 May 6:00pm AEST	Suncorp Stadium	41,462*
11	Canterbury Bankstown Bulldogs	12–24	New Zealand Warriors	Fri 12 May 6:00pm AEST	Accor Stadium	14,294
12	Canterbury Bankstown Bulldogs	20–18	Gold Coast Titans	Sun 21 May 2:00pm AEST	Accor Stadium	10.815
13	BYE
14	Sydney Roosters	25–24	Canterbury Bankstown Bulldogs	Sun 4 Jun 2:00pm AEST	Industree Group Stadium	18,338
15	Canterbury Bankstown Bulldogs	12–34	Parramatta Eels	Mon 12 Jun 4:00pm AEST	Accor Stadium	33,866
16	Cronulla Sutherland Sharks	48–10	Canterbury Bankstown Bulldogs	Sun 18 Jun 4:05pm AEST	PointsBet Stadium	11,901
17	BYE
18	Canterbury Bankstown Bulldogs	0–66	Newcastle Knights	Sun 02 Jul 2:00pm AEST	Accor Stadium	11,004
19	South Sydney Rabbitohs	32–36	Canterbury Bankstown Bulldogs	Sat 08 Jul 7:35pm AEST	Accor Stadium	16,166
20	Canterbury Bankstown Bulldogs	24–44	Brisbane Broncos	Sat 15 Jul 3:00pm AEST	Belmore Sports Ground	17,103
21	Penrith Panthers	44–18	Canterbury Bankstown Bulldogs	Sun 23 Jul 2:00pm AEST	BlueBet Stadium	21,525
22	Canterbury Bankstown Bulldogs	23–22	The Dolphins	Sun 30 Jul 2:00pm AEST	Salter Oval	5,130
23	BYE
24	Newcastle Knights	42–6	Canterbury Bankstown Bulldogs	Sun 13 Aug 4:05pm AEST	McDonald Jones Stadium	23,464
25	Canberra Raiders	36–24	Canterbury Bankstown Bulldogs	Sun 20 Aug 4:05pm AEST	GIO Stadium	12,402
26	Canterbury Bankstown Bulldogs	24–42	Manly-Warringah Sea Eagles	Sun 27 Aug 2:00pm AEST	Accor Stadium	13,074
27	Gold Coast Titans	34–30	Canterbury Bankstown Bulldogs	Sun 03 Sep 2:00pm AEST	Cbus Super Stadium	14,942
Legend: Win Loss Draw Bye | * Magic Round

Round 1: 4 March 2023	Manly Warringah Sea Eagles	31–6	Canterbury-Bankstown Bulldogs	Brookvale
15:00 AEDT	Tries: T. Trbojevic 16'; Garrick 35'; Cherry-Evans 42', 60', 79'; Goals: Garrick 5/6 18', 36', 44', 61', 80'; Field goals: Cherry-Evans 71'	[Report Report]	Tries: Mahoney 20'; Goals: Burton 1/1 21'; Sin bin: Flanagan (yellow card) 34' to 44'	Stadium: 4 Pines Park; Attendance: 17,278; Referee: Grant Atkins

Round 2: 11 March 2023	Melbourne Storm	12–26	Canterbury-Bankstown Bulldogs	Melbourne
19:35 AEDT	Tries: Asofa-Solomona 52'; Hughes 57'; Goals: Meaney 2/2 53', 58'; Sin bin: Tonumaipea (yellow card) 24' to 34'	[Report Report]	Tries: Preston 8'; Kiraz 27', 44'; Addo-Carr 33'; Averillo 49'; Goals: Burton 3/5 10', 34', 50'; Sin bin: Kikau (yellow card) 76' to 80'	Stadium: AAMI Park; Attendance: 17,248; Referee: Chris Butler

Round 3: 19 March 2023	Canterbury-Bankstown Bulldogs	26–22	Wests Tigers	Belmore
16:05 AEDT	Tries: Perham 4'; Addo-Carr 13', 28'; Burton 54'; Goals: Flanagan 5/5 6', 15', 30', 40 pen', 55'	[Report Report]	Tries: Naden 21'; Brooks 66'; Pole 69'; Staines 70'; Goals: Doueihi 3/4 23', 69', 70'	Stadium: Belmore Sports Ground; Attendance: 16,404; Referee: Todd Smith

Round 4: 26 March 2023	New Zealand Warriors	16–14	Canterbury-Bankstown Bulldogs	Auckland
16:00 NZDT	Tries: Vailea 27'; Montoya 55'; Johnson 66'; Goals: Johnson 2/3 28', 67'	[Report Report]	Tries: Kiraz 2'; Addo-Carr 44'; Goals: Burton 3/3 3', 8 pen', 45'	Stadium: Mount Smart Stadium; Attendance: 18,595; Referee: Peter Gough

Round 5: 2 April 2023	Canterbury-Bankstown Bulldogs	15–14 (g.p.)	North Queensland Cowboys	Sydney Olympic Park
18:15 AEST	Tries: Preston 18', 67'; Addo-Carr 79'; Goals: Burton 1/3 20'; Field goals: Burton 84'; Sin bin: Okunbor (yellow card) 13' to 23'	[Report Report]	Tries: Dearden 6'; Chester 59'; Goals: Holmes 3/4 7', 13 pen', 61'	Stadium: Accor Stadium; Attendance: 9,626; Referee: Liam Kennedy

Round 6: 7 April 2023	Canterbury-Bankstown Bulldogs	16–50	South Sydney Rabbitohs	Sydney Olympic Park
16:00 AEST	Tries: Averillo 3'; Burton 54', 72'; Goals: Burton 2/3 4', 56'; Sin bin: Preston (yellow card) 62' to 72'	[Report Report]	Tries: Murray 17'; L. Mitchell 31', 34', 66'; Host 38'; Walker 63'; Graham 68', 76', 78'; Goals: L. Mitchell 7/10 18', 28 pen', 33', 35', 39', 65', 67'	Stadium: Accor Stadium; Attendance: 35,211; Referee: Gerard Sutton

Round 7: 16 April 2023	Parramatta Eels	30–4	Canterbury-Bankstown Bulldogs	Parramatta
16:05 AEST	Tries: Penisini 21'; Sivo 25', 76'; Moses 27'; Campbell-Gillard 62'; Goals: Moses 5/6 22', 27', 64', 74 pen', 77'	[Report Report]	Tries: Alamoti 49'; Goals: Burton 0/1	Stadium: CommBank Stadium; Attendance: 26,755; Referee: Chris Butler

== Ladder ==
2023 NRL season
Pos	Team	Pld	W	D	L	B	PF	PA	PD	Pts
1	Penrith Panthers (P)	24	18	0	6	3	645	312	+333	42
2	Brisbane Broncos	24	18	0	6	3	639	425	+214	42
3	Melbourne Storm	24	16	0	8	3	627	459	+168	38
4	New Zealand Warriors	24	16	0	8	3	572	448	+124	38
5	Newcastle Knights	24	14	1	9	3	626	451	+175	35
6	Cronulla-Sutherland Sharks	24	14	0	10	3	619	497	+122	34
7	Sydney Roosters	24	13	0	11	3	472	496	−24	32
8	Canberra Raiders	24	13	0	11	3	486	623	−137	32
9	South Sydney Rabbitohs	24	12	0	12	3	564	505	+59	30
10	Parramatta Eels	24	12	0	12	3	587	574	+13	30
11	North Queensland Cowboys	24	12	0	12	3	546	542	+4	30
12	Manly Warringah Sea Eagles	24	11	1	12	3	545	539	+6	29
13	Dolphins	24	9	0	15	3	520	631	−111	24
14	Gold Coast Titans	24	9	0	15	3	527	653	−126	24
15	Canterbury-Bankstown Bulldogs	24	7	0	17	3	438	769	−331	20
16	St. George Illawarra Dragons	24	5	0	19	3	474	673	−199	16
17	Wests Tigers	24	4	0	20	3	385	675	−290	14

== 2023 squad ==
Canterbury Bulldogs 2023 squad
Top 30 squad - 2023 NRL season			Development players	Coaching staff
Josh Addo-Carr – WG; Paul Alamoti – CE; Jake Averillo – CE, FB, HB; Braidon Burns – CE, WG; Matt Burton (c) – FE, HB; Declan Casey – WG; Raymond Faitala-Mariner (c) – LK, SR, PR; Kyle Flanagan – HB, HK, FE; Reece Hoffman – CE, SR; Sam Hughes – PR	Viliame Kikau – SR; Max King – PR; Jacob Kiraz – WG, CE; Liam Knight – PR; Reed Mahoney (c) – HK; Jayden Okunbor – SR, WG; Karl Oloapu – FE; Tevita Pangai Junior – PR, LK, SR; Chris Patolo – PR; Franklin Pele – PR	Hayze Perham – FB; Jacob Preston – SR; Ethan Quai-Ward – CE; Toby Sexton – HB; Jeral Skelton – WG; Ryan Sutton – PR, LK; Luke Thompson – PR, LK; Jackson Topine – SR; Corey Waddell – SR, LK	Kitione Kautoga – SR; Isaac Matalavea-Booth – PR; Joseph O'Neill – HB, FE; Jordan Samrani – CE; Extended squad: Bailey Biondi-Odo – HB, FE; Harrison Edwards – LK, PR; Kurtis Morrin – LK; Khaled Rajab – FE; Jayden Tanner – PR; Blake Wilson – WG	Manager: Phil Gould (General Manager of Football); Head coach: Cameron Ciraldo; Assistant coaches: Mick Potter; Chad Randall; David Tangata-Toa (NSW Cup Coach); Managers: Fred Ciraldo (Team Manager); Legend: (c) Captain(s); (vc) Vice-captain(s); Updated: 10 May 2023; Source(s): Bulldogs 2023

== Awards ==
=== Canterbury-Bankstown Bulldogs awards night ===
Held at Doltone House, Darling Island, Tuesday 5 September.

- Dr George Peponis Medal (NRL Player of the Year): Jacob Preston
- Coaches Award: Jacob Kiraz
- Steve Mortimer Medal (NRL Rookie of the Year): Jacob Preston
- Member's Player of the Year: Jacob Preston
- Peter Warren Award (Community Service): Viliame Kikau
- Terry Lamb Medal (Player of the Year New South Wales Cup): Jayden Tanner
- Hazem El Masri Medal (Player of the Year Jersey Flegg Cup): Lachlan Vale
- Ron Massey Cup Player of the Year: Josh Kalati
- Harold Matthews Cup Player of the Year: Mitchell Woods
- S.G. Ball Cup Player of the Year: AJ Jones
- Tarsha Gale Cup Player of the Year: Tarli Dennis
- NSWRL Women's Premiership Player of the Year: Holli Wheeler
- Les Johns Medal (Club Person of the Year): Melanie Riccio
- Employee of the Year: Caitlin Glanville
