= Eli Clark =

Australian rugby league footballer (born 2002)

Personal information
- Born: 2002 (age 23–24)

Playing information
- Position: Centre, Wing
Club
Years	Team	Pld	T	G	FG	P
2024	Canterbury Bulldogs	1	0	0	0	0

Eli Clark (born 2002) is an Australian rugby league footballer who played for the Canterbury-Bankstown Bulldogs in the NRL.

== Rugby league career ==
An outside back, Clark was a Forster Tuncurry Hawks junior and played early representative rugby league for the Canterbury-linked North Coast Bulldogs, before joining the NRL club in 2000.

Clark spent three seasons in Canterbury-Bankstown's Jersey Flegg Cup side, which included a premiership in 2023, and played regular NSW Cup fixtures in the 2023 and 2024 seasons. He made his solitary first-grade appearance for the Bulldogs in the final round of the 2024 NRL season against the North Queensland Cowboys. Both Clark and fellow debutant Jonathan Sua were standing in for injured wingers Josh Addo-Carr and Jeral Skelton.

At the end of the 2024 season, Clark left the Bulldogs to join Cronulla-Sutherland.

== Personal life ==
Clark has worked as teacher at Belmore Boys High School.
