= Jayden Tanner =

Australian rugby league footballer

Personal information
- Born: 25 July 2000 (age 24); Sydney, New South Wales, Australia

Playing information
- Position: Prop
Club
Years	Team	Pld	T	G	FG	P
2023	Canterbury Bulldogs	3	0	0	0	0
2024	Featherstone Rovers	2	0	0	0	0
	Total	5	0	0	0	0
- Source: As of 6 Jun 2025

Jayden Tanner (born 25 July 2000) is an Australian professional rugby league footballer who last played as a prop for Featherstone Rovers in the RFL Championship.

== Background ==
Tanner was born in Sydney, New South Wales. While attending Patrician Brothers' College, Blacktown, he was an Australian Schoolboys representative in 2018. He played his junior rugby league for the Hills District Bulls. In 2019, the Penrith Panthers signed him to a development contract.

== Playing career ==
=== Canterbury-Bankstown Bulldogs ===
In 2022, Tanner joined the Canterbury-Bankstown Bulldogs. In round 1 of the 2023 NRL season, Tanner made his first grade debut in his side's 31–6 loss to the Manly Warringah Sea Eagles at Brookvale Oval. At the Bulldogs annual awards in September 2023, Tanner was the recipient of the Terry Lamb Medal for the NSW Cup Player of the Year.

=== Featherstone Rovers ===
On 9 Feb 2024 it was reported that he had signed for Featherstone Rovers in the RFL Championship

On 4 Jun 2024 it was reported that he had parted with Featherstone Rovers and returned to Australia
