= Alekolasimi Jones =

New Zealand rugby league footballer (born 2004)

AJ Jones

Personal information
- Full name: Alekolasimi Jones
- Born: 2 November 2004 (age 21)

Playing information
- Position: Lock, Second-row
Club
Years	Team	Pld	T	G	FG	P
2026–	Canterbury Bulldogs	6	0	0	0	0
- Source: RLP

Alekolasimi Jones (born 2 November 2004) is a New Zealand rugby league footballer for the Canterbury-Bankstown Bulldogs in the National Rugby League (NRL).

== Early life ==
Jones attended St Paul's College, Auckland, and played his early rugby league for local club Ellerslie Eagles.

== Career ==
A back-rower primarily, Jones came through the Bulldogs's junior pathways from the age of 17. He made six appearances for the Bulldogs during the 2026 NRL season, debuting against the North Queensland Cowboys in round nine, and was named the club's "Rookie of the Year". After agreeing to a two-year contract extension in 2026, Jones is signed on to remain with Bulldogs until the end of 2029 season.
