= Ethan Quai-Ward =

Australian rugby league footballer

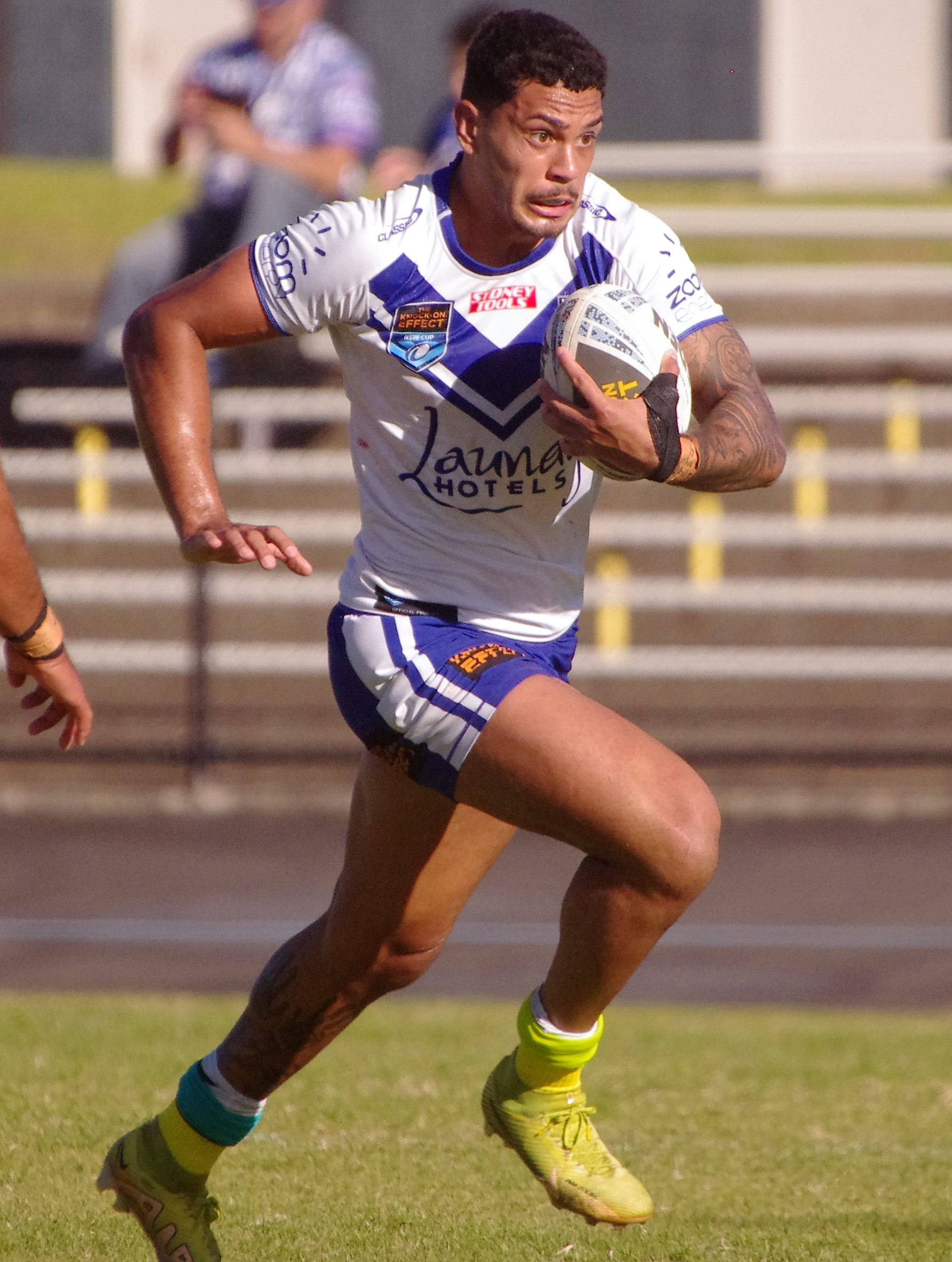

Personal information
- Full name: Ethan Quai-Ward
- Born: 18 August 1999 (age 27) Wagga Wagga, New South Wales, Australia
- Height: 6 ft 3 in (1.90 m)
- Weight: 15 st 2 lb (96 kg)

Playing information
- Position: Centre
Club
Years	Team	Pld	T	G	FG	P
2023	Canterbury Bulldogs	1	1	0	0	4
2026–	Toulouse Olympique	12	2	0	0	8
	Total	13	3	0	0	12
- Source: As of 19 September 2026

Ethan Quai-Ward (born 18 August 1999) is an Australian rugby league footballer who plays as a centre for Toulouse Olympique in the Super League.

== Playing career ==
=== 2023 ===
Quai-Ward made his NRL debut in Round 19 against the South Sydney Rabbitohs, scoring one try on debut. Quai-Ward left the Canterbury Bulldogs at the end of the season returning to Queensland to join Souths Logan Magpies.

=== 2026 ===
On 29 April 2026, it was reported he had signed for Toulouse Olympique in the Super League on a 1½ year deal.
