= Delouise Hoeter =

Tonga international rugby league footballer

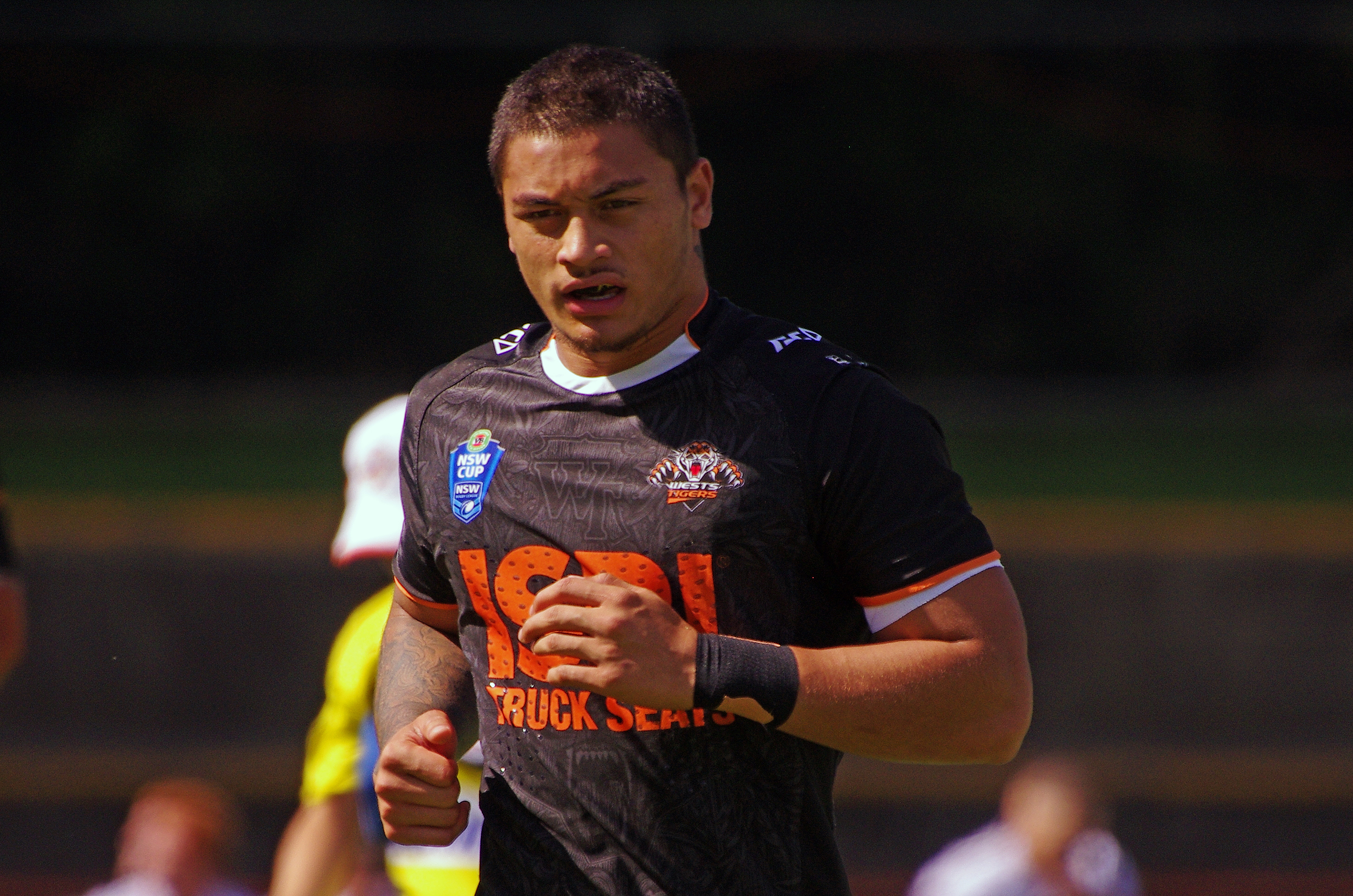

Personal information
- Full name: Delouise Hoeter
- Born: 6 March 1994 (age 32) Tonga
- Height: 185 cm (6 ft 1 in)
- Weight: 92 kg (14 st 7 lb)

Playing information
- Position: Centre, Wing
Club
Years	Team	Pld	T	G	FG	P
2015	Wests Tigers	7	0	0	0	0
2022–25	Brisbane Broncos	9	5	0	0	20
	Total	16	5	0	0	20
Representative
Years	Team	Pld	T	G	FG	P
2015	Tonga	1	0	0	0	0
2017–19	Queensland Residents	2	5	0	0	20
- Source: As of 4 July 2025

Delouise Hoeter (born 6 March 1994) is a Tongan professional rugby league footballer who last played as a centre for the Brisbane Broncos in the National Rugby League (NRL).

He previously played for the Wests Tigers in the NRL and Townsville Blackhawks, Norths Devils and the Wynnum Manly Seagulls in the Queensland Cup.

== Background ==
Born in Tonga, Hoeter moved to Auckland, New Zealand at age 5 and played his junior rugby league for the Marist Saints. He later moved to Queensland, Australia to attend Keebra Park State High School before being signed by the Wests Tigers.

== Playing career ==
=== Early career ===
In 2013 and 2014, Hoeter played for the Wests Tigers' NYC team. In September 2013, he was named in the Junior Kiwis train-on squad, but missed the game due to injury. On 12 February 2014, he re-signed with the Tigers on a 2-year contract. Coach Mick Potter said, "Delouise is a very good outside back who's [sic] understanding and anticipation of what is going to happen is excellent and I'm looking forward to seeing him progress." In September 2014, Hoeter was again named in the Junior Kiwis train-on squad, but again missed the game due to injury.

=== 2015 ===
In 2015, Hoeter graduated to the Tigers' New South Wales Cup team. In Round 4 of the 2015 NRL season, he made his NRL debut for the Tigers against the Canterbury-Bankstown Bulldogs. On 17 October, he played for Tonga against the Cook Islands in their 2017 Rugby League World Cup qualifier match. In December, he was released from the final year of his Tigers contract.

=== 2016 ===
In January 2016, Hoeter signed with the Townsville Blackhawks in the Intrust Super Cup on a one-year deal.

=== 2017 ===
Hoeter joined the Norths Devils for their 2017 campaign in the Intrust Super Cup.

In November, Hoeter signed with the Wynnum Manly Seagulls for the 2018 season of the Intrust Super Cup.

=== 2021 ===
In December 2021, the Brisbane Broncos announced that Hoeter had been upgraded to a Top 30 NRL contract from a train & replacement contract for the 2022 season.

The 27-year-old – who played seven NRL games for the Wests Tigers in 2015 – had a standout 2021 in the centres for Broncos Affiliate Wynnum Manly Seagulls in the Intrust Super Cup, crossing for 11 tries in 20 games as well as racking up 10 try assists and 66 tackle breaks as his team reached the Grand Final.

"Delouise is a great example of why you should never give up on your dream." "He came to the Broncos looking for a chance at 27 years of age and grabbed it with both hands. I’m excited to see what he brings in 2022." - Ben Ikin, Brisbane Broncos Football & Performance Director.

=== 2022 ===
Hoeter made his club debut for the Brisbane Broncos in round 6 against the Penrith Panthers, in a 40-12 loss. In Round 17, Hoeter played his second game for the Brisbane club scoring his first two tries in a 32-18 win over St. George Illawarra, after being called up 24 hours before the game due to Corey Oates being called into the Queensland Maroons team because of covid cases to Cameron Munster and Murray Taulagi. He started at centre in Brisbane's loss to St. George Illawarra in round 25 of the 2022 NRL season, he finished the season for the Brisbane outfit with four tries from seven appearances. In September 2022, Hoeter signed a two-year contract extension to remain with the Broncos until the end of the 2024 NRL season.

=== 2023 ===
Hoeter played only the one game for Brisbane in the 2023 NRL season which came in the final round against Melbourne. Brisbane would go on the lose the match 32-22.

=== 2025 ===
He got a start at centre playing in jersey 18 in a depleted Brisbane Broncos side scoring a brilliant go ahead try that eventually proved the difference in the 22-18 win, playing against Canterbury Bankstown Bulldogs, in his first match of the season in the top grade. On 24 October, Brisbane announced that Hoeter re-signed with the club for a further year.

=== 2026 ===
On 28 August, it was announced by Brisbane that Hoeter would be departing the club after not being offered a new contract.
