= Lipoi Hopoi =

Australian rugby league footballer

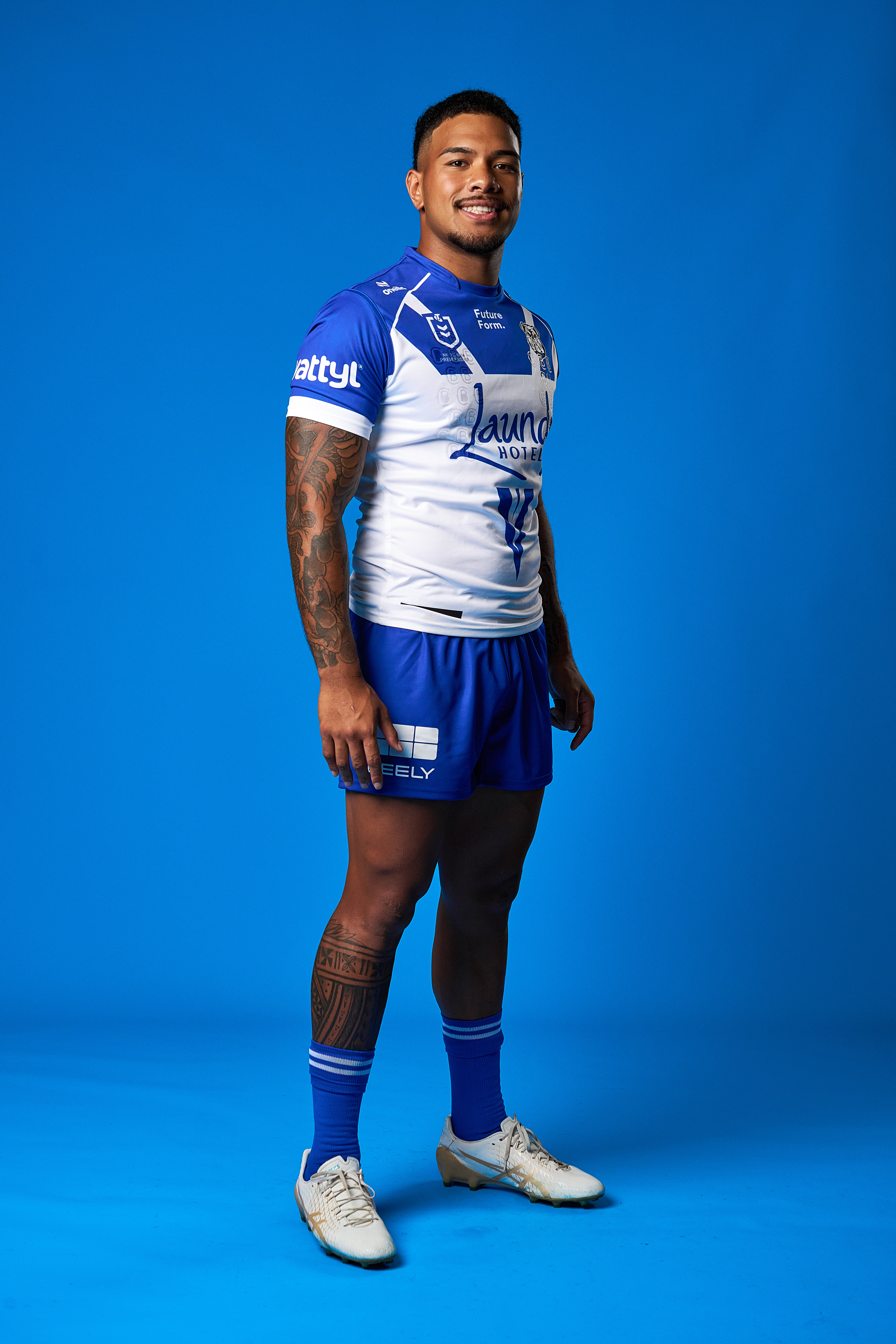

Personal information
- Full name: Lipoi Hopoi
- Born: 13 March 2002 (age 24) Sydney, New South Wales, Australia
- Height: 183 cm (6 ft 0 in)
- Weight: 105 kg (16 st 7 lb)

Playing information
- Position: Prop, Lock
Club
Years	Team	Pld	T	G	FG	P
2024–26	Canterbury Bulldogs	17	1	0	0	4
2027–	Canberra Raiders	0	0	0	0	0
	Total	17	1	0	0	4
- Source: As of 15 September 2026

Lipoi Hopoi (born 13 March 2002) is an Australian professional rugby league footballer who plays as a prop and lock for the Canberra Raiders in the National Rugby League (NRL).

== Background ==
Hopoi is a local junior from the St George Dragons in the Canterbury-Bankstown District Junior Rugby League. He progressed through the Bulldogs' pathways system, playing in the Harold Matthews, SG Ball, and Jersey Flegg Cups, where he was a member of the 2023 Premiership-winning team.

== Playing career ==
=== Canterbury-Bankstown Bulldogs ===
Hopoi made his first grade debut in round 13 of the 2024 season, coming off the bench in a 32–2 victory over the Newcastle Knights.

In August 2024, Hopoi signed a two-year contract extension with Canterbury, keeping him at the club until the end of the 2026 NRL season. He was expected to be promoted to the Top 30 roster in 2026.

In early August, it was reported that Hopoi had signed a deal with the Canberra Raiders. On 22 September 2026, the Raiders officially announced the signing of Hopoi on a two year deal.
