= Bailey Hayward =

Scotland international rugby league footballer (born 2001)

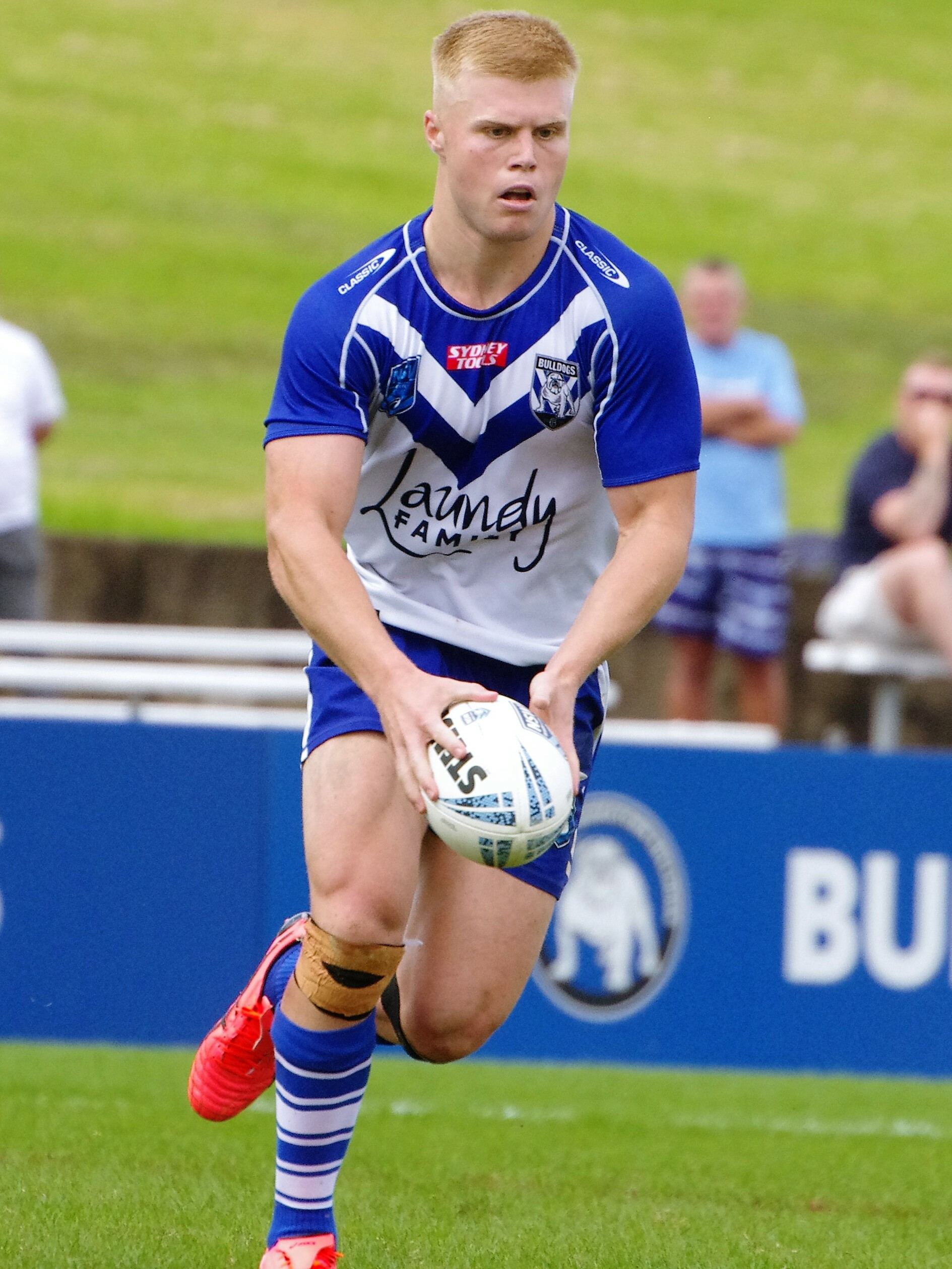

Personal information
- Full name: Bailey Hayward
- Born: 5 April 2001 (age 25) Camperdown, New South Wales, Australia
- Height: 175 cm (5 ft 9 in)
- Weight: 83 kg (13 st 1 lb)

Playing information
- Position: Hooker, Lock, Five-eighth
Club
Years	Team	Pld	T	G	FG	P
2024–	Canterbury Bulldogs	70	2	0	0	8
Representative
Years	Team	Pld	T	G	FG	P
2022	Scotland	2	0	0	0	0
- Source: As of 3 September 2026
- Relatives: Paul Hayward (grandfather)

Bailey Hayward (born 5 April 2001) is a Scotland international rugby league footballer who plays as a hooker, lock and five-eighth for the Canterbury-Bankstown Bulldogs in the NRL.

== Background ==
Hayward was born in Camperdown, New South Wales, Australia. He is of Scottish descent. He is the grandson of former Newtown Jets player Paul Hayward and the brother of Central Coast Mariners forward Paige Hayward in the A-League Women.

Hayward is a Canterbury-Bankstown local junior from the St George Dragons (Clemton Park) junior club.

== Club career ==
=== 2024 ===
Hayward made his first grade debut for Canterbury in Round 6 of the 2024 NRL season, in a narrow 16-14 loss against the Melbourne. In Round 7, Hayward scored his first NRL try in the Bulldogs' 36–12 victory over the Newcastle Knights at Accor Stadium. Hayward played 20 games for Canterbury in the 2024 NRL season as the club qualified for the finals finishing 6th on the table. Hayward played in their elimination final loss against Manly.

=== 2025 ===
On 25 March, Hayward re-signed with Canterbury until the end of 2026. On 10 August, the Bulldogs announced that Hayward had extended his contract with the team again until the end of 2028.

Following a shock loss to the Wests Tigers in round 22, Hayward was selected to start ahead of former Canterbury captain and hooker, Reed Mahoney. Hayward played 69 minutes against the New Zealand Warriors in Round 23, as Canterbury dispelled conjecture that they could not play in wet weather conditions with a 32-14 victory over a fellow Top Four contender. Hayward started the remaining fixtures in the regular season, scoring his first try of 2025 against the Melbourne Storm in a narrow 20-14 defeat in round 25. Hayward played 26 games for Canterbury in the 2025 NRL season as the club finished fourth and qualified for the finals. Canterbury would be eliminated from the finals in straight sets.

=== 2026 ===
Hayes played 24 matches for Canterbury in the 2026 NRL season as the club finished 12th on the table.

== International career ==
In 2022, Hayward was named in the Scotland squad for the 2021 Rugby League World Cup.

== Statistics ==
Year	Team	Games	Tries	Pts
2024	Canterbury-Bankstown Bulldogs	20	1	4
2025	Canterbury-Bankstown Bulldogs	26	1	4
2026	Canterbury-Bankstown Bulldogs	4		
	Totals	50	2	8
