= Jake Turpin =

Australian rugby league footballer

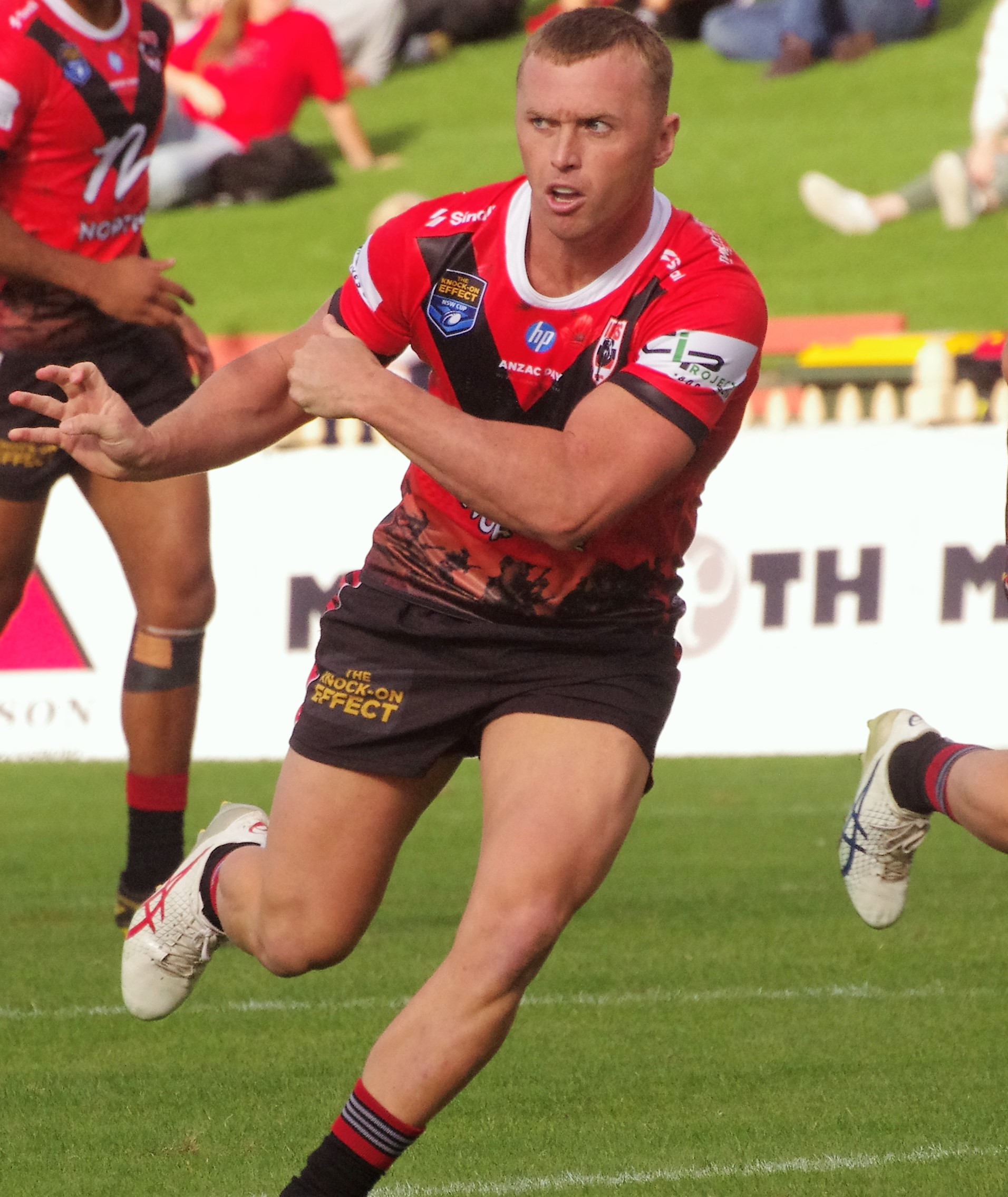

Personal information
- Full name: Jake Anthony Turpin
- Born: 16 November 1996 (age 30) Brisbane, Queensland, Australia
- Height: 178 cm (5 ft 10 in)
- Weight: 86 kg (13 st 8 lb)

Playing information
- Position: Hooker, Halfback
Club
Years	Team	Pld	T	G	FG	P
2018–22	Brisbane Broncos	60	4	0	0	16
2023	Sydney Roosters	15	0	0	0	0
2024–26	Canterbury Bulldogs	14	0	0	0	0
	Total	89	4	0	0	16
- Source: As of 3 September 2026

Jake Turpin (born 16 November 1996) is an Australian professional rugby league footballer who last played as a hooker for the Canterbury-Bankstown Bulldogs.

He previously played for the Brisbane Broncos and the Sydney Roosters in the National Rugby League (NRL).

== Background ==
Turpin was born in Brisbane, Queensland, Australia.

He played his junior rugby league for Redlands and the Ipswich Brothers, before being signed by the Melbourne Storm.

== Playing career ==
=== Early years ===
From 2014 to 2016, Turpin played for the Melbourne Storm NYC team, playing 44 games scoring 9 tries and kicking one field goal before graduating to their Queensland Cup team, Sunshine Coast Falcons in 2017.

=== 2018 ===
In 2018, Turpin joined the Brisbane Broncos. In round 17 of the 2018 NRL season, he made his NRL debut for the Broncos against the Gold Coast Titans, starting off the interchange bench after regular hooker Andrew McCullough was called up to the Queensland State of Origin team.

=== 2019 ===
Turpin played 15 games for Brisbane in the 2019 NRL season including the club's 58–0 loss against Parramatta in the elimination final.

=== 2020 ===
Turpin played six games for Brisbane in the 2020 NRL season due to a broken leg and a broken hand injuries suffered, as the club finished last on the table and claimed their first ever wooden spoon.

=== 2021 ===
In round 10, Turpin captained his first game for the Brisbane club stepping in for Alex Glenn. Brisbane would go on to lose the match 50–6 against Manly-Warringah.

=== 2022 & 2023 ===
Turpin played a total of 15 games for Brisbane in the 2022 NRL season as the club missed the finals. At the end of 2022, he signed a contract to join the Sydney Roosters. Turpin played a total of 15 games for the Sydney Roosters in the 2023 NRL season. On 21 September, it was announced that Turpin had been released by the club after not being able to secure a new contract. On 24 September, Turpin played for North Sydney in their 2023 NSW Cup grand final loss against South Sydney. On 8 November 2023, Turpin signed a contract to join the Canterbury ahead of the 2024 NRL season.

=== 2025 ===
Turpin only featured in three games for Canterbury in the 2025 NRL season as the club finished third and qualified for the finals.

=== 2026 ===
Turpin was limited to just seven appearances with Canterbury in the 2026 NRL season as the club finished 12th on the table.

== Statistics ==
Year	Team	Games	Tries	Pts
2018	Brisbane Broncos	2		
2019	Brisbane Broncos	15	3	12
2020	Brisbane Broncos	6	1	4
2021	Brisbane Broncos	22		
2022	Brisbane Broncos	15		
2023	Sydney Roosters	15		
2024	Canterbury-Bankstown Bulldogs	4		
2025	Canterbury-Bankstown Bulldogs	3		
2026	Canterbury-Bankstown Bulldogs	3		
	Totals	85	4	16
