= Jack Todd (rugby league) =

Australian rugby league footballer

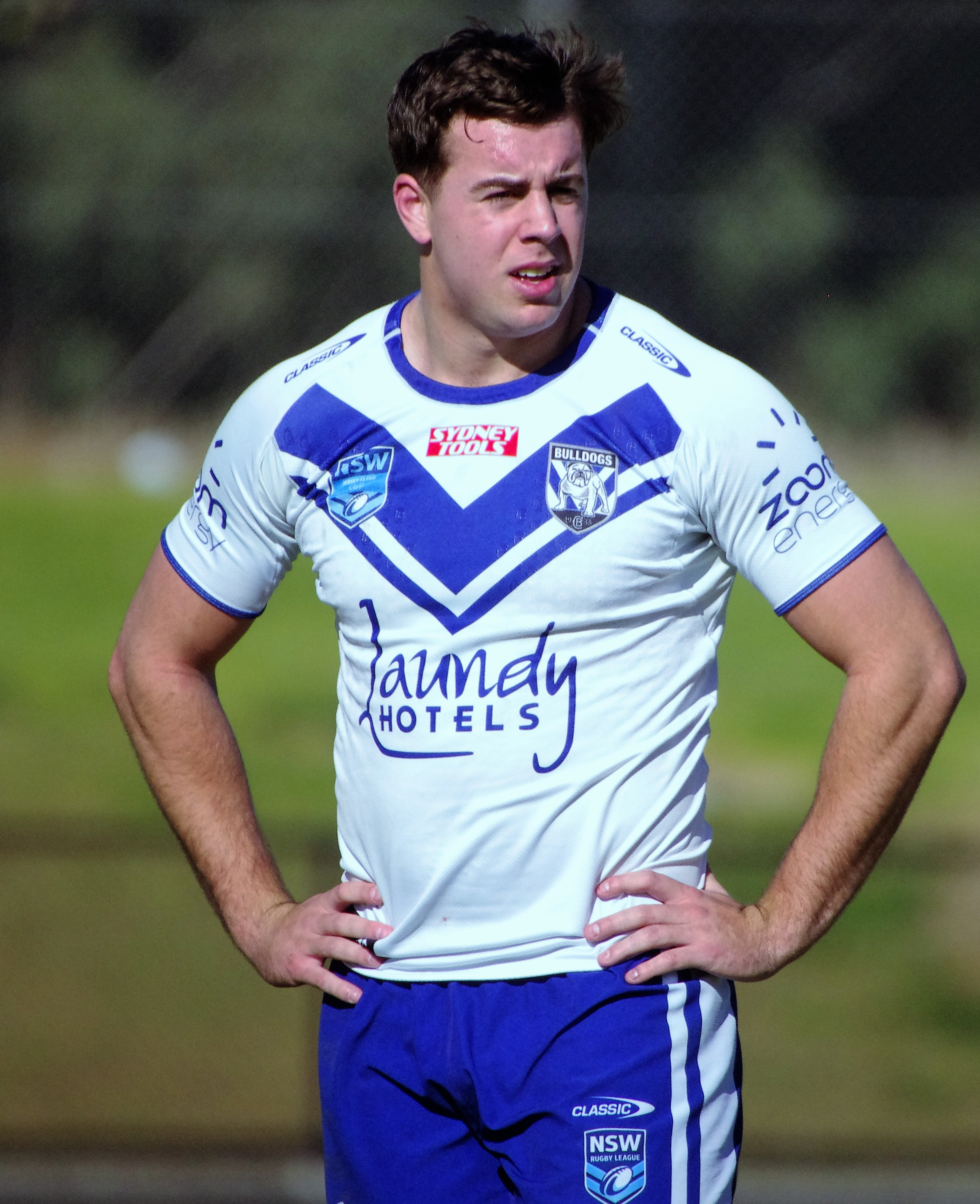

Personal information
- Full name: Jack Todd
- Born: 21 April 2002 (age 24) Manilla, New South Wales, Australia
- Height: 188 cm (6 ft 2 in)
- Weight: 106 kg (16 st 10 lb)

Playing information
- Position: Lock, Prop
Club
Years	Team	Pld	T	G	FG	P
2025–26	Canterbury Bankstown Bulldogs	4	1	0	0	4
2027–	Castleford Tigers	0	0	0	0	0
	Total	4	1	0	0	4
- Source: As of 22 November 2026

Jack Todd (born 21 April 2002) is an Australian professional rugby league footballer who plays as a lock or prop forward for the Castleford Tigers in the Super League.

He has previously played for Canterbury Bulldogs in the National Rugby League.

== Background ==
Todd hails from Dungowan in northern New South Wales and played junior rugby league for the Tamworth Bears.

He joined the Bulldogs' pathways system in 2019.

== Playing career ==
=== Canterbury-Bankstown Bulldogs ===
While injury hampered the promising young forward throughout 2024, after impressing in the pre-season, he made his first-grade debut in Round 4 of the 2025 NRL season, coming off the bench in a 20–6 victory over Cronulla.

=== Castleford Tigers ===
On 11 November 2026, Castleford Tigers announced the signing of Todd on a two-year deal from the 2027 Super League season.
