= Daniel Suluka-Fifita =

Australian rugby league footballer

Daniel Fifita
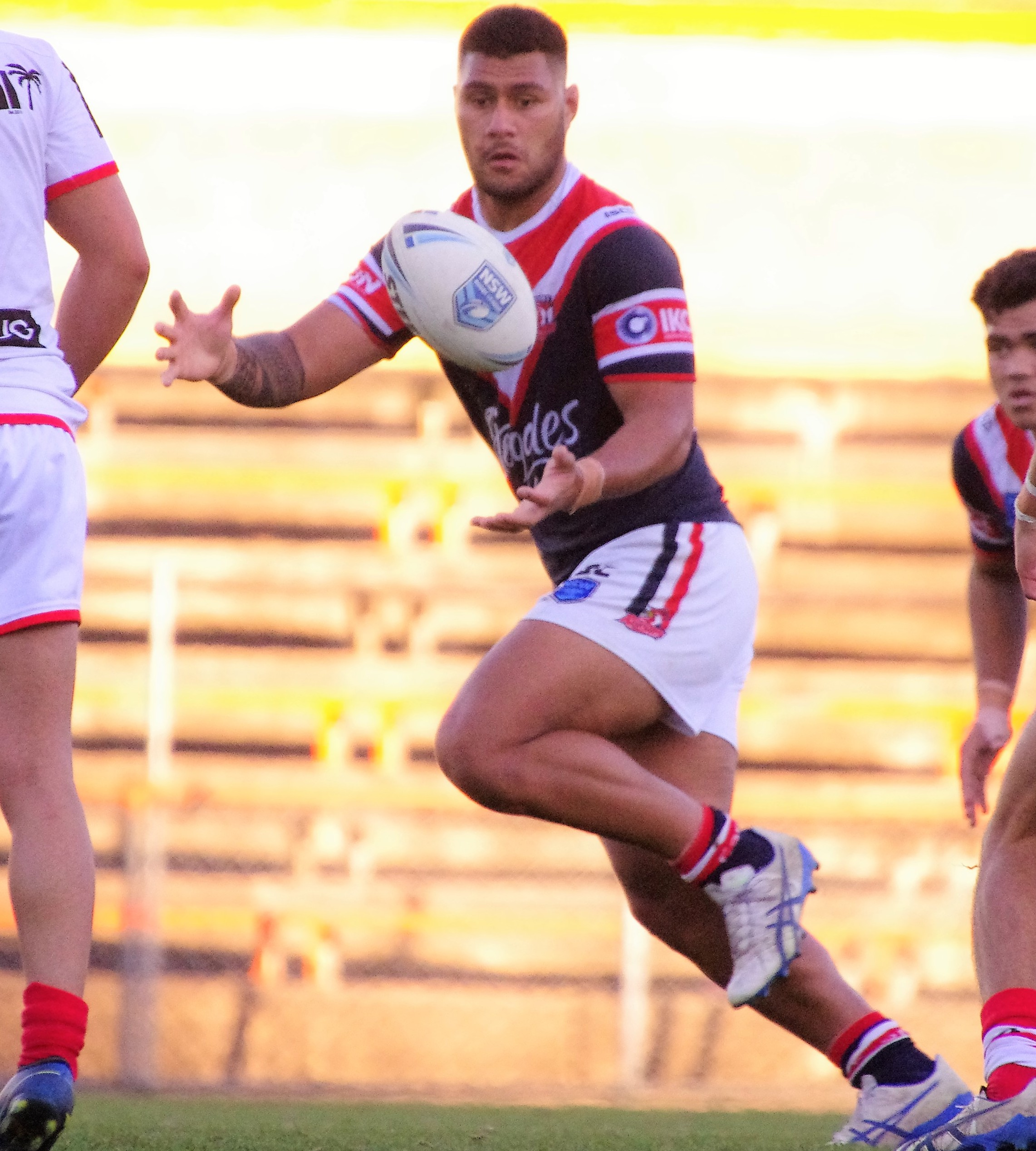

Personal information
- Full name: Daniel Suluka-Fifita
- Born: 19 August 1999 (age 27) Sydney, New South Wales, Australia
- Height: 6 ft 4 in (1.92 m)
- Weight: 17 st 9 lb (112 kg)

Playing information
- Position: Prop
Club
Years	Team	Pld	T	G	FG	P
2020–22	Sydney Roosters	20	0	0	0	0
2022–23	South Sydney	15	0	0	0	0
2025–26	Canterbury Bulldogs	11	1	0	0	4
2026–	St Helens	13	0	0	0	0
	Total	59	1	0	0	4
- Source: As of 6 November 2026

Daniel Suluka-Fifita (born 19 August 1999) is an Australian professional rugby league footballer who plays as a prop forward for St Helens in the Betfred Super League.

He previously played for the Sydney Roosters, South Sydney Rabbitohs and the Canterbury-Bankstown Bulldogs in the National Rugby League.

== Background ==
Suluka-Fifita played his junior rugby league for the Matraville Tigers. Suluka-Fifita is of Tongan descent.

== Career ==
=== 2020 ===
Suluka-Fifita made his debut in round 12 of the 2020 NRL season for the Sydney Roosters against the Gold Coast Titans.

=== 2021 ===
In round 3 of the 2021 NRL season, he was sent to the sin bin during the Sydney Roosters 26-16 loss against archrivals Souths after punching Jai Arrow in the back of the head after making a tackle.

=== 2022 ===
On 13 June, Suluka-Fifita signed a three-year deal to join arch-rivals South Sydney starting in the 2023 NRL season. Suluka-Fifita was later released early from the Sydney Roosters and made his club debut for Souths in their round 17 match against Newcastle which South Sydney won 40-28.

=== 2023 ===
He played a total of ten games for Souths in the 2023 NRL season as the club finished 9th on the table and missed the finals.

=== 2024 ===
On 4 March 2024, Suluka-Fifita signed a two-year deal to join Canterbury-Bankstown Bulldogs.

=== 2025 ===
On 19 August, Canterbury announced that Suluka-Fifita had re-signed with the club for a further year. He played eleven matches for Canterbury in the 2025 NRL season as the club finished fourth and qualified for the finals. Canterbury would be eliminated from the finals in straight sets.

=== 2026 ===
On 26 May 2026, Canterbury announced that Suluka-Fifita had been released from his contract and signed a two and a half year deal with St Helens in the Super League. He made his club debut for St Helens in round 14 against Warrington.

== Statistics ==
Year	Team	Games	Tries	Pts
2020	Sydney Roosters	4		
2021	Sydney Roosters	9		
2022	Sydney Roosters	7		
2022	South Sydney Rabbitohs	5		
2023	South Sydney Rabbitohs	10		
2025	Canterbury-Bankstown Bulldogs	11	1	4
2026	Canterbury-Bankstown Bulldogs			
2026	St Helens	2		
	Totals	48	1	4
