= Harry Hayes (rugby league) =

Australian rugby league footballer

Personal information
- Full name: Harry Hayes
- Born: 3 May 2002 (age 24) Woy Woy, New South Wales, Australia
- Height: 190 cm (6 ft 3 in)
- Weight: 102 kg (16 st 1 lb)

Playing information
- Position: Second-row, Prop
Club
Years	Team	Pld	T	G	FG	P
2024–	Canterbury Bulldogs	53	2	0	0	8
- Source: As of 3 September 2026

Harry Reems Hayes (born 3 May 2002) is an Australian professional rugby league footballer who plays as a second-row forward for the Canterbury-Bankstown Bulldogs in the National Rugby League (NRL).

== Background ==
Hayes Hayes from Woy Woy, New South Wales, and began his rugby league journey with The Entrance Tigers. He is the grandson of Merv Hicks, a former Canterbury and Great Britain international who was part of the 1967 Grand Final team that narrowly lost to South Sydney.

== Playing career ==
=== Junior and lower grades ===
Initially starting his career as a fullback, Hayes transitioned to the wing and then into the centres. By 2022, he had moved into the back row, where he became a key player for the Bulldogs' Jersey Flegg Cup team, alternating between centre and second-row positions. His performances earned him recognition, including the Terry Lamb Medal as the club's best NSW Cup player in 2024.

=== Canterbury-Bankstown Bulldogs ===
Hayes made his NRL debut in Round 20 of the 2024 season against the North Queensland Cowboys at Queensland Country Bank Stadium. As of July 2025, he made 13 NRL appearances, scoring one try and contributing four points to the team's efforts. On 6 August, Canterbury announced that Hayes had signed an extension with the club until the end of 2029. Hayes played 23 games for Canterbury in the 2025 NRL season as the club finished third and qualified for the finals. Canterbury would be eliminated from the finals in straight sets. Hayes played 21 matches for Canterbury in the 2026 NRL season as the club finished 12th on the table.

== Statistics ==
Year	Team	Games	Tries	Pts
2024	Canterbury-Bankstown Bulldogs	9	1	4
2025	Canterbury-Bankstown Bulldogs	23	1	4
2026	Canterbury-Bankstown Bulldogs	13		
	Totals	45	2	8
