= Blake S. Wilson =

American research scientist

Blake Shaw Wilson is an American research scientist best known for his role in developing signal processing strategies for the cochlear implant.

== Degrees ==
His undergraduate and Ph.D. degrees from Duke University, are in electrical engineering. He also holds a D. Science degree from the University of Warwick and a D. Engineering degree from University of Technology Sydney. In addition, he has been awarded honorary doctorates from Uppsala University and from the University of Salamanca.

== Neural prosthesis research ==
His initial research projects investigated sound source localization in humans and bats and the effects of microwave radiation on the auditory system. In 1977, he began work as a research engineer at the Research Triangle Institute (RTI). He was the head of the RTI Neuroscience Program 1983–1994, the director of the Center for Auditory Prosthesis Research 1994–2002, and was a Senior Fellow 2002–07.

In 1983, Wilson received the first of seven contracts (1983–2005) from the Neural Prosthesis Branch of the National Institutes of Health (NIH) to investigate sound coding strategies for cochlear implants. This long period of continuous funding allowed him to investigate multiple signal coding strategies. The best known is the high-rate, continuous interleaved sampling (CIS) processor.

Among many other features, CIS presents non-simultaneous pulses to the different electrodes in the implant, which greatly reduces deleterious interactions, or crosstalk, among the electrodes. Other signal coding strategies developed and implemented in his laboratory include predecessors of the Fine Structure Processing (FSP, FS4) strategies and of the Fidelity120 virtual channel strategy.

In collaboration with Cochlear Americas, Duke University and the NIH, Wilson's group also developed and evaluated a high pulse rate, channel-picking strategy. A direct outcome was the advanced combination encoder, or ACE strategy.

== Awards and honors ==
In 2013, Wilson (with Graeme Clark and Ingeborg Hochmair) was awarded the Lasker-DeBakey Clinical Medical Research Award "for the development of the modern cochlear implant."

In 2015, with G. Clark, E. Hochmair, I. Hochmair, and M. Merzenich, he was awarded the Russ Prize "for engineering cochlear implants that allow the deaf to hear."

In 2017, he was elected a member of the National Academy of Engineering (NAE) and he received the Helmholtz-Rayleigh Interdisciplinary Silver Medal from the Acoustical Society of America (ASA) "for contributions to the development and adoption of cochlear implants."

In 2019, he received Duke's Distinguished Alumni Award.

In 2026, he was awarded the Queen Elizabeth Prize for Engineering

== Selected publications ==
- Wilson, Blake (2012). Better Hearing with Cochlear Implants: Studies at the Research Triangle Institute. San Diego, Plural Publishing, Inc. Archived from the original on October 14, 2018.
- Niparko JK, Kirk KI, Mellon NK, Robbins AM, Tucci DL, Wilson BS (Eds.), Cochlear Implants: Principles & Practices, Lippincott Williams & Wilkins, Philadelphia, PA, 2000.
- Niparko JK, Kirk KI, Mellon NK, Robbins AM, Tucci DL, Wilson BS (Eds.), Cochlear Implants: Principles & Practices, Second Edition, Lippincott Williams & Wilkins, Philadelphia, PA, 2009.
