= Karl Oloapu =

Samoa international rugby league footballer

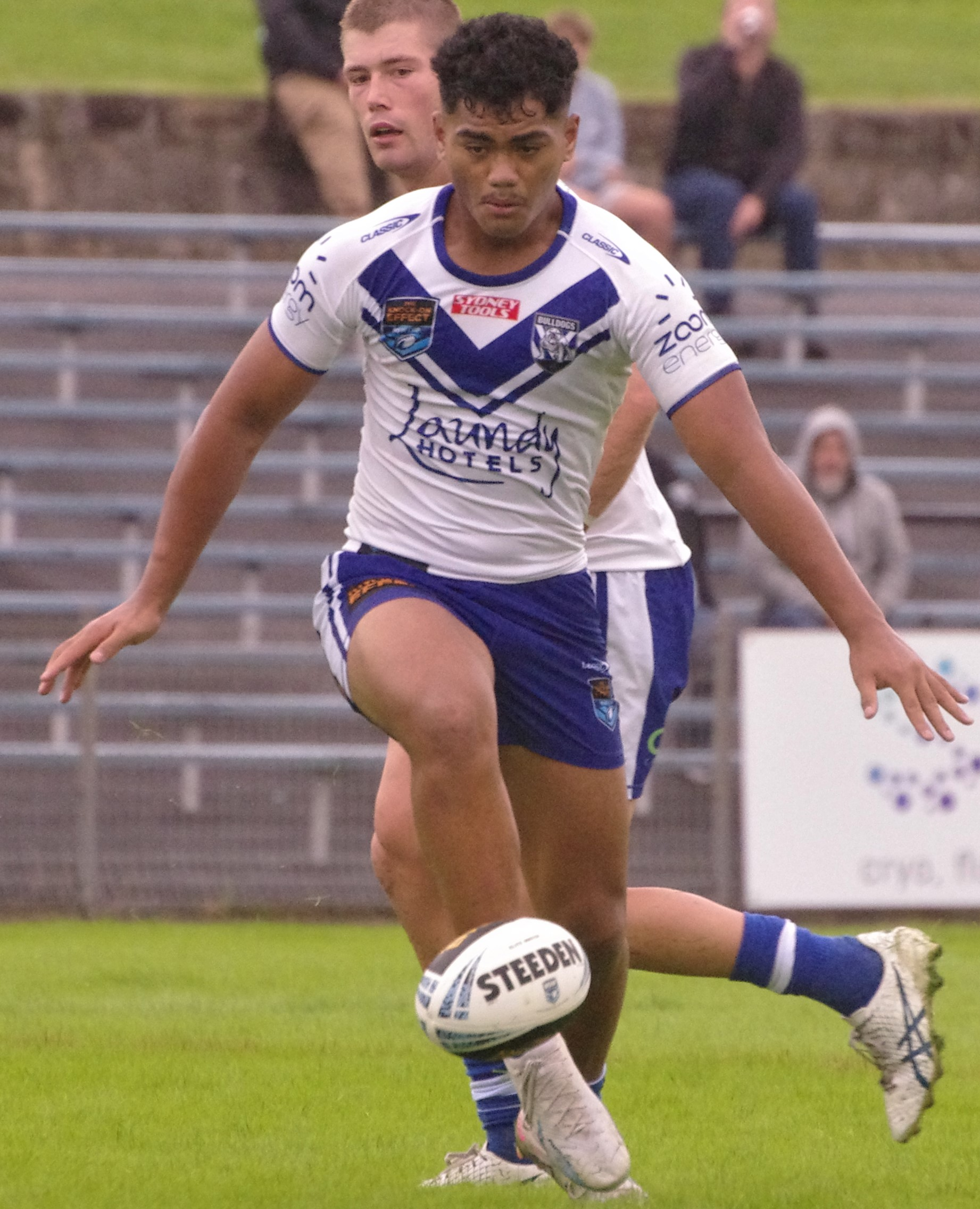

Personal information
- Full name: Karl Oloapu
- Born: 18 January 2005 (age 21) Wellington, New Zealand
- Height: 185 cm (6 ft 1 in)
- Weight: 94 kg (14 st 11 lb)

Playing information
- Position: Five-eighth
Club
Years	Team	Pld	T	G	FG	P
2023–24	Canterbury Bulldogs	7	0	0	0	0
- Source: As of 18 June 2023

Karl Oloapu (born 18 January 2005) is a professional rugby league footballer who last played as a five-eighth for the Canterbury-Bankstown Bulldogs in the National Rugby League (NRL).

== Background ==
Oloapu was born in Wellington, New Zealand and is of Samoan descent. He began playing junior rugby league for the Randwick Kingfishers before moving to Brisbane, Queensland.

In Brisbane, Oloapu played junior rugby league for the Redcliffe Dolphins and attended Wavell State High School.

== Playing career ==
=== Early career ===
Oloapu was signed by the Brisbane Broncos as a 13-year-old, joining their academy. In 2021, he played for the Redcliffe Dolphins in the Cyril Connell Challenge.

In January 2022, Oloapu re-signed with Broncos until the end of the 2025 season. Later the year he played for the Norths Devils in the Mal Meninga Cup and was selected for the Australian Schoolboys, captaining the side on their tour of Fiji.

In November 2022, 10 months after re-signing with the Broncos, Oloapu requested a release from his contract, citing a number of broken promises by the club. On 9 November 2022, the Broncos released a statement, denying the request and any wrongdoing, stating that Oloapu had since hired a new manager and requested an upgrade to his deal. On 11 November 2022, Oloapu and his manager, former NRL player Matt Adamson, released a statement, with Oloapu stating "I will never play for Brisbane as long as I live." He subsequently stopped attending training with the club. The NRL and RLPA later reviewed the situation at the request of Oloapu and Adamson and found no wrongdoing by the Broncos.

=== 2023 ===
On 26 January, the Broncos placed a $500,000 transfer fee on Oloapu. On 27 January, a day later, the Canterbury-Bankstown Bulldogs announced the signing of Oloapu on a four-year contract.

On 1 February, Oloapu was named in Queensland's under-19 emerging Origin squad. In March, he began the season playing for the Bulldogs' New South Wales Cup side.

In round 9 of the 2023 NRL season, Oloapu made his first-grade debut for Canterbury, coming off the interchange bench in their 18–16 win over the St. George Illawarra Dragons at WIN Stadium.

=== 2024 ===
Oloapu would not play in the 2024 NRL season, after he underwent surgery for a bulging disc in his neck. In March 2024, the Bulldogs requested salary cap relief due to his injury.

=== 2025 ===
On 25 February, the Bulldogs announced a mutual agreement that they had released Oloapu from his playing contract effective immediately.
