= Toby Sexton =

Australian rugby league footballer

Personal information
- Born: 1 March 2001 (age 25) Sunnybank, Queensland, Australia
- Height: 6 ft 0 in (1.84 m)
- Weight: 13 st 8 lb (86 kg)

Playing information
- Position: Scrum-half
Club
Years	Team	Pld	T	G	FG	P
2021–23	Gold Coast Titans	24	4	41	0	98
2023–25	Canterbury Bulldogs	41	6	9	0	42
2026	Catalans Dragons	29	14	47	0	150
2027–	Perth Bears	0	0	0	0	0
	Total	94	24	97	0	290
- Source: As of 6 November 2026

Toby Sexton (born 1 March 2001) is an Australian professional rugby league footballer who plays as a scrum-half for the Perth Bears in the NRL.

== Background ==
Sexton was born in Sunnybank, a suburb of Brisbane, Queensland.

== Playing career ==
=== 2021 ===
In round 19 of the 2021 NRL season, Sexton made his debut for the Gold Coast against the St. George Illawarra Dragons, scoring a try and kicking six goals during a 32–10 victory.

=== 2022 ===
Sexton played a total of 19 games for the Gold Coast in the 2022 NRL season as the club finished 13th on the table.

=== 2023 ===
On April 9, he scored the match winning try in his NRL recall against the St. George Illawarra Dragons in round 6 of the 2023 NRL season. On 4 July, he was released from his contract with the Gold Coast and transferred to the Canterbury-Bankstown Bulldogs immediately, signing a two-year deal. Sexton made his Canterbury debut in the clubs 36-32 victory over South Sydney in round 19 of the competition.

=== 2024 ===
Sexton played 16 games for Canterbury in the 2024 NRL season as the club qualified for the finals finishing 6th on the table. During the season, Sexton usurped Drew Hutchison to become the club's first choice halfback. Sexton played in Canterbury's elimination finals loss against Manly.

=== 2025 ===
On 4 July, Sexton signed a two-year deal to join French side the Catalans Dragons in the Super League. It had been reported a month earlier that Sexton was told his services were no longer required at the end of the 2025 NRL season after the signing of Lachlan Galvin. Canterbury were sitting at the top of the table at the time of this decision. Sexton played a total of 18 games for Canterbury in 2025 as the club finished 3rd on the table. Canterbury would be eliminated from the finals in straight sets losing to both Melbourne and Penrith. On 29 November 2025, it was reported that Sexton had signed a two-year deal starting in 2027 with the Perth Bears becoming a marquee signing for the incoming club. Sexton signed this contract without having played a single match for his new club Catalans.

== Statistics ==
Year	Team	Games	Tries	Goals	Pts
2021	Gold Coast Titans	4	1	16	36
2022	Gold Coast Titans	19	2	25	58
2023	Gold Coast Titans	1	1		4
2023	Canterbury Bulldogs	7	2		8
2024	Canterbury Bulldogs	16	1	5	14
2025	Canterbury Bulldogs	11	1		4
2026	Catalans Dragons	29	14	47	150
2027	Perth Bears				
	Totals	94	24	97	290
