= Kurtis Morrin =

Australian rugby league footballer

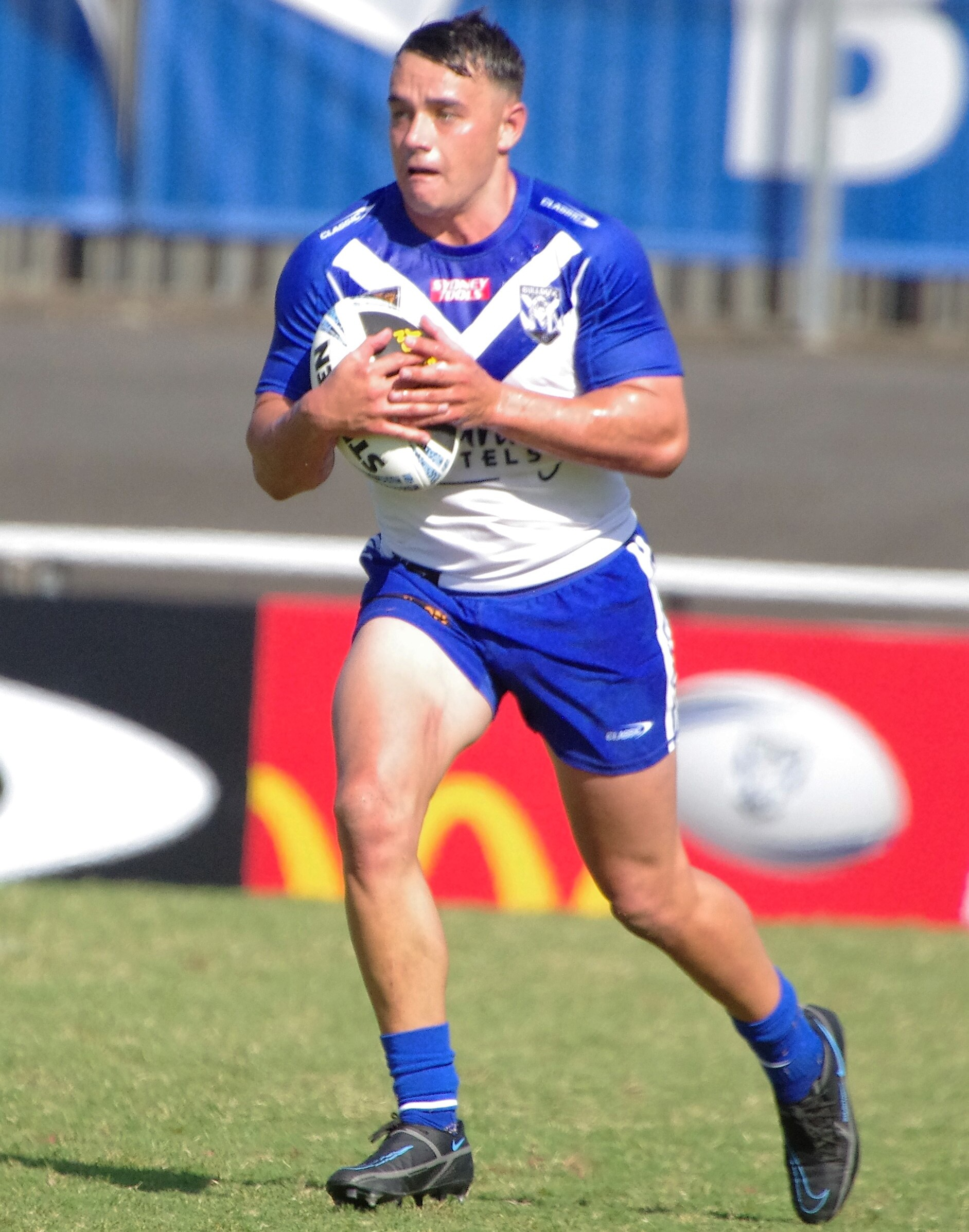

Personal information
- Born: 17 March 2000 (age 26) Sydney, New South Wales, Australia
- Height: 177 cm (5 ft 10 in)
- Weight: 95 kg (14 st 13 lb)

Playing information
- Position: Lock, Hooker
Club
Years	Team	Pld	T	G	FG	P
2022–25	Canterbury-Bankstown Bulldogs	46	4	0	0	16
2026–	Gold Coast Titans	22	7	0	0	28
	Total	68	11	0	0	44
Representative
Years	Team	Pld	T	G	FG	P
2025	Māori All Stars	1	0	0	0	0
2026	Prime Minister's XIII	1	1	0	0	4
- Source: As of 6 November 2026
- Relatives: Brad Morrin (uncle)

Kurtis Morrin (born 17 March 2000) is an Australian professional rugby league player who plays as a lock for the Gold Coast Titans in the National Rugby League (NRL).

== Background ==
Morrin is of Maori descent through his Mother and is the nephew of former Canterbury player Brad Morrin. Morrin played junior rugby league for the Moorebank Rams.

== Playing career ==
Morrin made his first grade debut from the bench in his side's 36–12 victory over the Wests Tigers at Western Sydney Stadium in round 15 of the 2022 season. Morrin also scored a try on debut. On 25 September, Morrin played for Canterbury's NSW Cup team in their grand final loss to Penrith. Morrin played 12 matches for Canterbury in the 2023 NRL season as the club finished 15th on the table.

=== 2024 ===
Morrin played 23 games for Canterbury in the 2024 NRL season which saw Canterbury qualify for the finals finishing 6th on the table. Morrin played in their elimination finals loss against Manly.

=== 2025 ===
On 5 June the Gold Coast announced that Morrin had signed a two-year deal and would depart Canterbury at the end of the season.

=== 2026 ===
Morrin played 22 games for the Gold Coast in the 2026 NRL season as the club finished 16th on the table.

He made his Prime Minister's XIII début on 3 October 2026 in the 10-60 win over PNG Prime Minister's XIII in Port Moresby, scoring a try.

== Statistics ==
Year	Team	Games	Tries	Pts
2022	Canterbury-Bankstown Bulldogs	3	1	4
2023	Canterbury-Bankstown Bulldogs	12	2	8
2024	Canterbury-Bankstown Bulldogs	23	1	4
2025	Canterbury-Bankstown Bulldogs	8		
2026	Gold Coast Titans	16	6	24
2027	Gold Coast Titans			
	Totals	62	10	40
