= Samuel Hughes (rugby league) =

Australian rugby league footballer

Sam Hughes
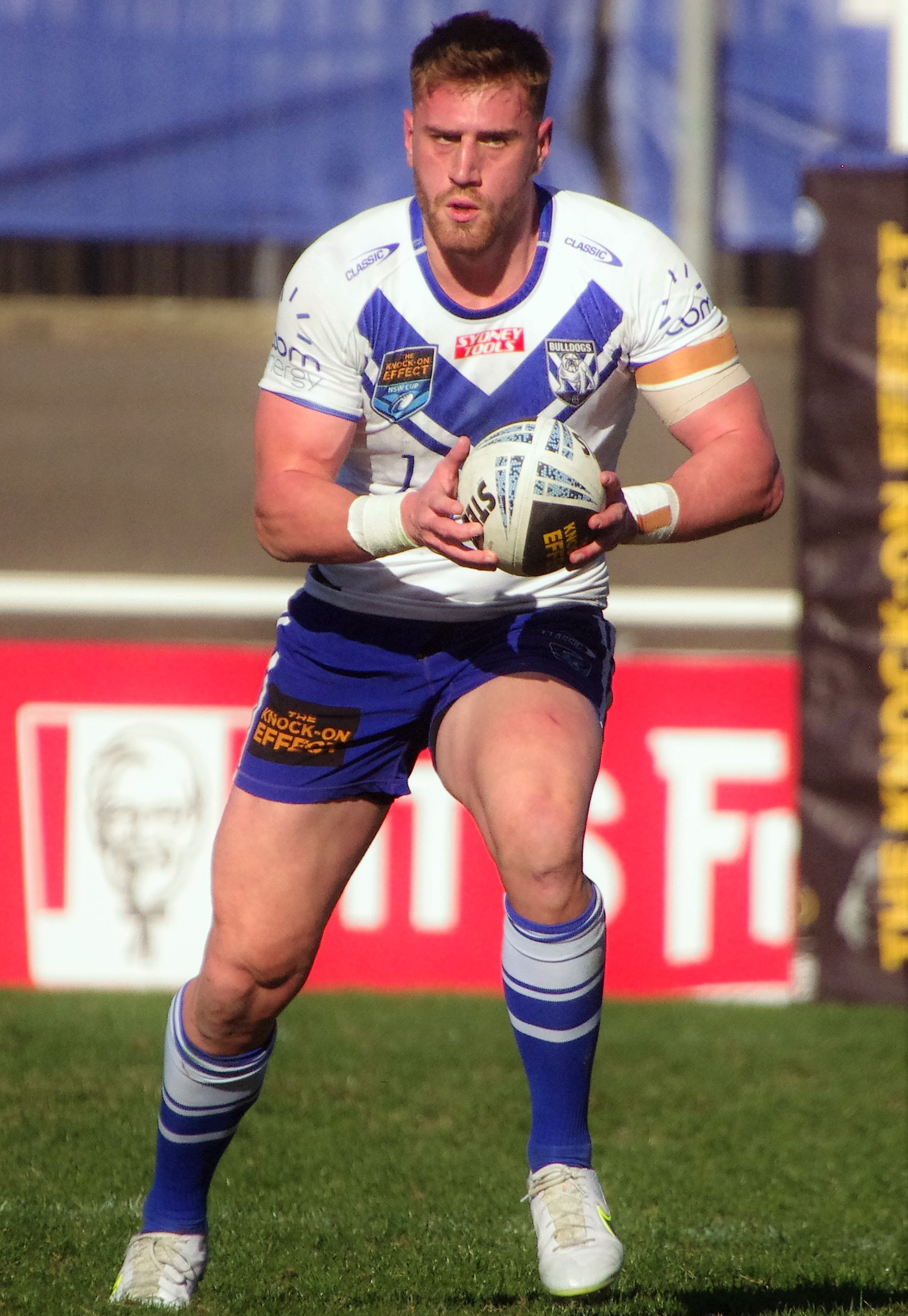

Personal information
- Full name: Samuel Hughes
- Born: 31 January 2001 (age 25) Cronulla, New South Wales, Australia
- Height: 193 cm (6 ft 4 in)
- Weight: 111 kg (17 st 7 lb)

Playing information
- Position: Prop
Club
Years	Team	Pld	T	G	FG	P
2023–	Canterbury Bulldogs	48	5	0	0	20

Samuel Hughes (born 31 January 2001) is an Australian professional rugby league footballer who plays as a prop forward for the Canterbury-Bankstown Bulldogs in the National Rugby League.

== Background ==
Hughes was born in Cronulla, New South Wales.

== Playing career ==
Hughes was scouted by the Parramatta Eels as a Harold Matthews Cup prospect and plucked from the nursery of the Cronulla-Sutherland Sharks before debuting for Parramatta in 2017. He proved to be a dynamic weapon off the edge in his first campaign at the Eels and was particularly lethal in the red zone where his superior size and athleticism relative to the age bracket made him a mismatch nightmare.

In 2021 and 2022, Hughes played for the Parramatta Eels in the Jersey Flegg Cup, where he was touted as a player to watch.

In 2023, Hughes joined the Canterbury-Bankstown Bulldogs. Hughes made his first grade debut from the bench in his side's 50−16 loss to the South Sydney Rabbitohs in the annual Good Friday clash at Stadium Australia in round 6 of the 2023 NRL season. Hughes played 25 games for 2024 NRL season as the club qualified for the finals finishing 6th on the table. Hughes played for the club in their elimination final loss against Manly. Hughes was limited to just ten games for Canterbury in the 2025 NRL season as the club finished fourth and qualified for the finals. Canterbury would be eliminated from the finals in straight sets. Hughes played only eight matches for Canterbury in the 2026 NRL season as the club finished 12th on the table.

== Statistics ==
Year	Team	Games	Tries	Pts
2023	Canterbury-Bankstown Bulldogs	5		
2024	Canterbury-Bankstown Bulldogs	25	2	8
2025	Canterbury-Bankstown Bulldogs	10	2	8
2026	Canterbury-Bankstown Bulldogs	3		
	Totals	43	4	16
