= Jonathan Sua =

Australian rugby league footballer

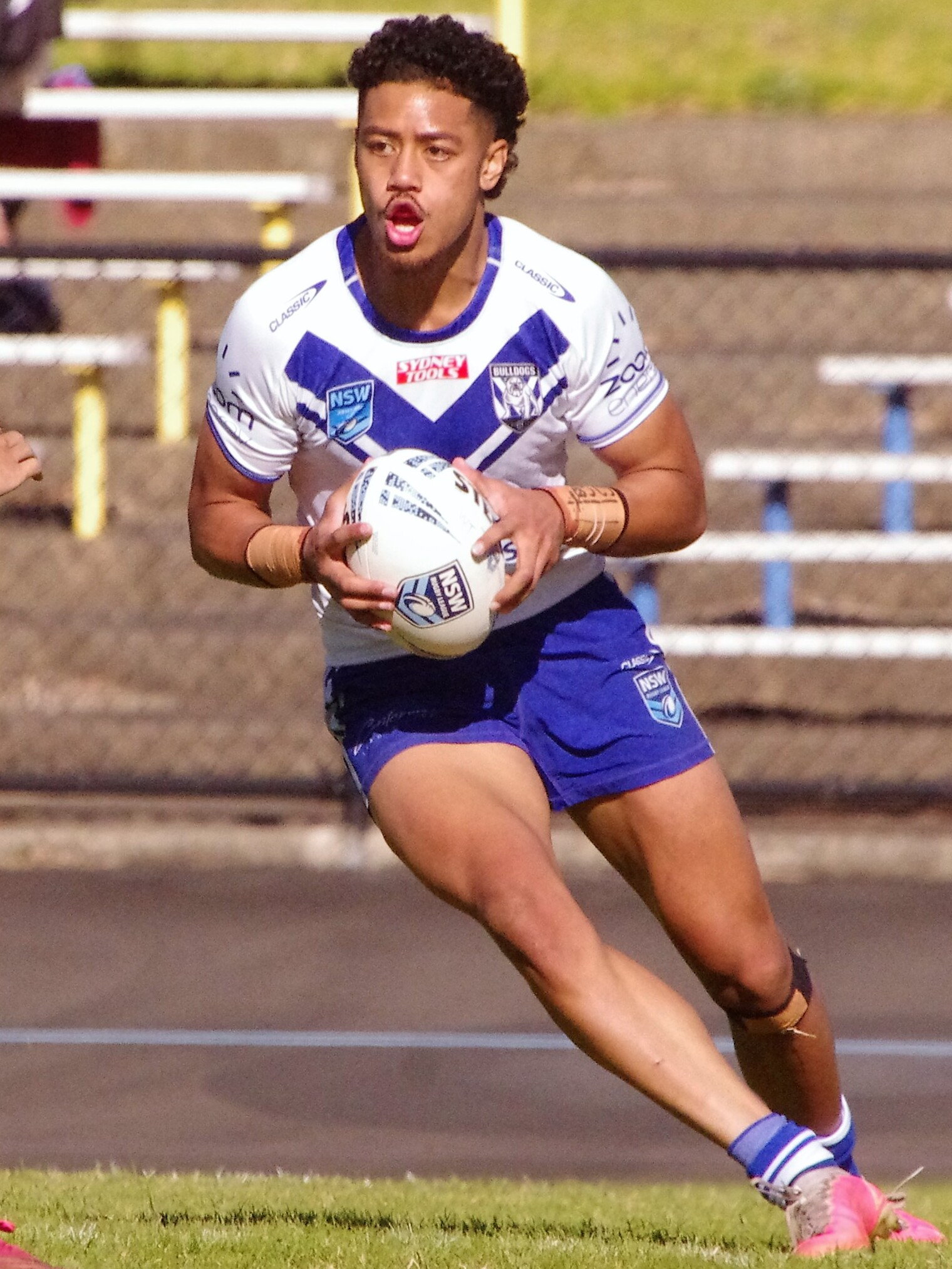

Personal information
- Full name: Jonathan Su’a
- Born: 17 August 2004 (age 22)
- Height: 189 cm (6 ft 2 in)
- Weight: 88 kg (13 st 12 lb)

Playing information
- Position: Wing
Club
Years	Team	Pld	T	G	FG	P
2024–26	Canterbury Bulldogs	7	1	0	0	4
2027–	Perth Bears	0	0	0	0	0
	Total	7	1	0	0	4
- Source: As of 20 October 2026

Jonathan Sua is a professional rugby league footballer who plays as a winger for the Perth Bears in the NRL.

== Background ==
Sua attended Bass High School in Sydney, New South Wales, Australia.

He played for the St Johns Eagles as a junior. Su'a graduated through the Canterbury Bulldogs junior system, playing in their Harold Matthews, SG Ball and Jersey Flegg sides.

== Career ==
Sua made his debut in July 2023 for Canterbury against the South Sydney Rabbitohs in the NSW Cup. He played nearly 40 reserve grade games for Canterbury-Bankstown between 2023 and 2025, including a stand-out 2025 where he scored 15 tries in 21 matches.

He played in a pre-season National Rugby League trial game for the Bulldogs in 2024 and two in 2025.

He is contracted at Belmore until the end of the 2026 NRL season.

On 2 September 2026, the Perth Bears announced Sua had signed with the club on a three year deal.
