= Blake Wilson (rugby league) =

Australian rugby league footballer (born 2000)

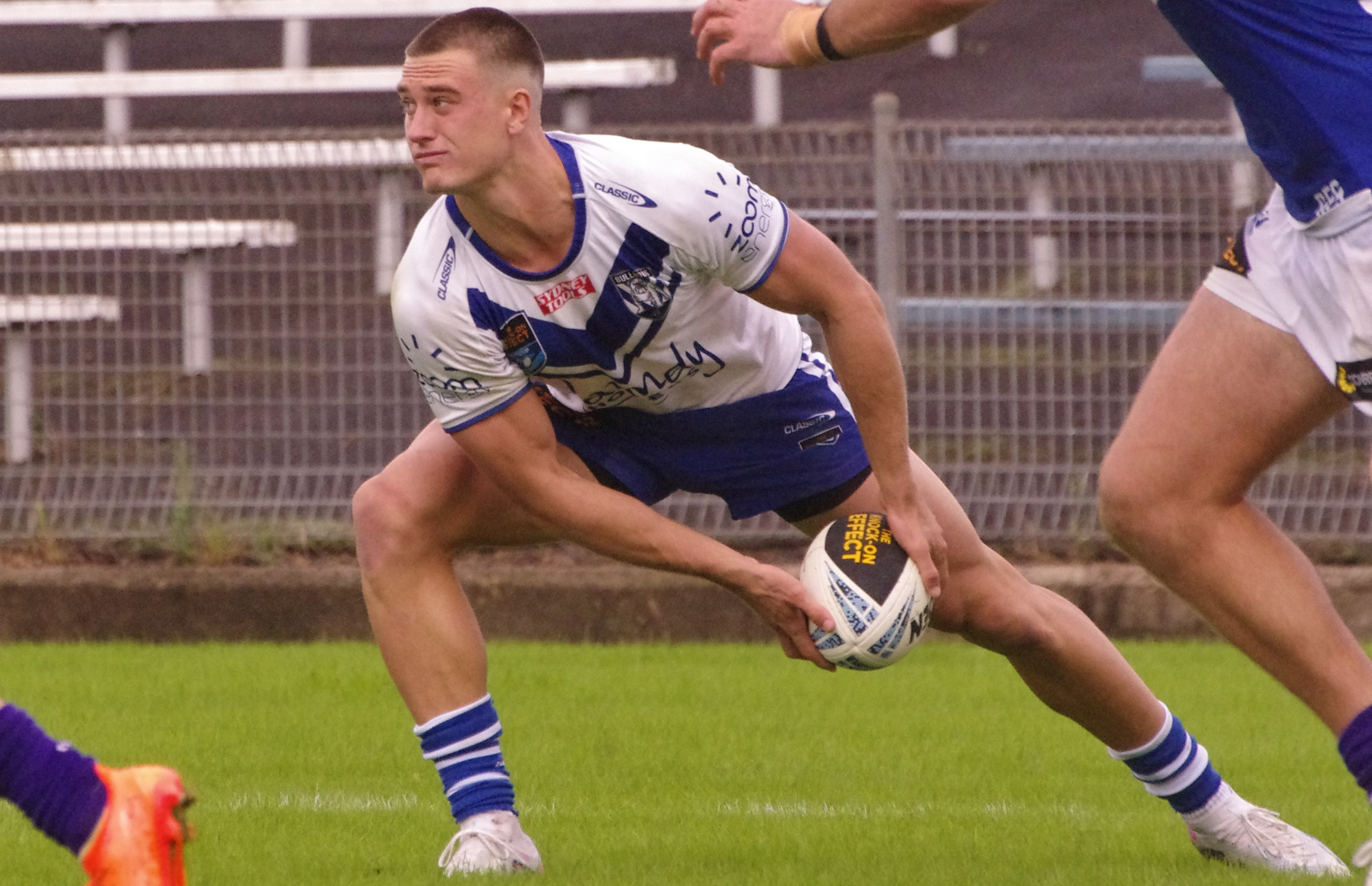

Personal information
- Born: 19 August 2000 (age 26) Noosa, Queensland, Australia
- Height: 186 cm (6 ft 1 in)
- Weight: 95 kg (14 st 13 lb)

Playing information
- Position: Wing
Club
Years	Team	Pld	T	G	FG	P
2023–25	Canterbury Bulldogs	27	12	0	0	48
2026	Manly Sea Eagles	3	2	0	0	8
2027–	Perth Bears	0	0	0	0	0
	Total	30	14	0	0	56
- As of 14 November 2026

Blake Wilson (born 19 August 2000) is an Australian professional rugby league footballer who most recently played as a winger for the Perth Bears in the National Rugby League.

== Background ==
Wilson previously played for the Sunshine Coast Falcons in the Hostplus Cup competition. He signed with the Canterbury-Bankstown Bulldogs for 2023. He signed with the Manly-Warringah Sea Eagles for 2026.

== Playing career ==
=== 2023 ===
In round 11 of the 2023 NRL season, Wilson made his first-grade debut for Canterbury in their 24–12 loss to the New Zealand Warriors. In round 19, Wilson scored a hat-trick in Canterbury's 36-32 victory over South Sydney. Wilson played a total of 11 matches for Canterbury in the 2023 NRL season and scored six tries as the club finished 15th on the table.

=== 2024 ===
In round 14 of the 2024 NRL season, Wilson scored two tries for Canterbury in their 22-18 victory over arch-rivals Parramatta. Wilson played a total of ten games for the club in the 2024 NRL season as they qualified for the finals finishing 6th on the table.

=== 2025 ===
Wilson would make just six appearances, scoring two tries for Canterbury in 2025, primarily playing for Canterbury's NSW Cup team. On 15 August, Wilson would sign a two-year deal to join the Manly Warringah Sea Eagles on a two-year deal.

=== 2026 ===
In September, Wilson was one of twelve players that was released by the Manly club. On 30 October 2026, the Perth Bears announced the signing of Wilson for the 2027 season.
