= Jacob Kiraz =

Lebanon international rugby league footballer

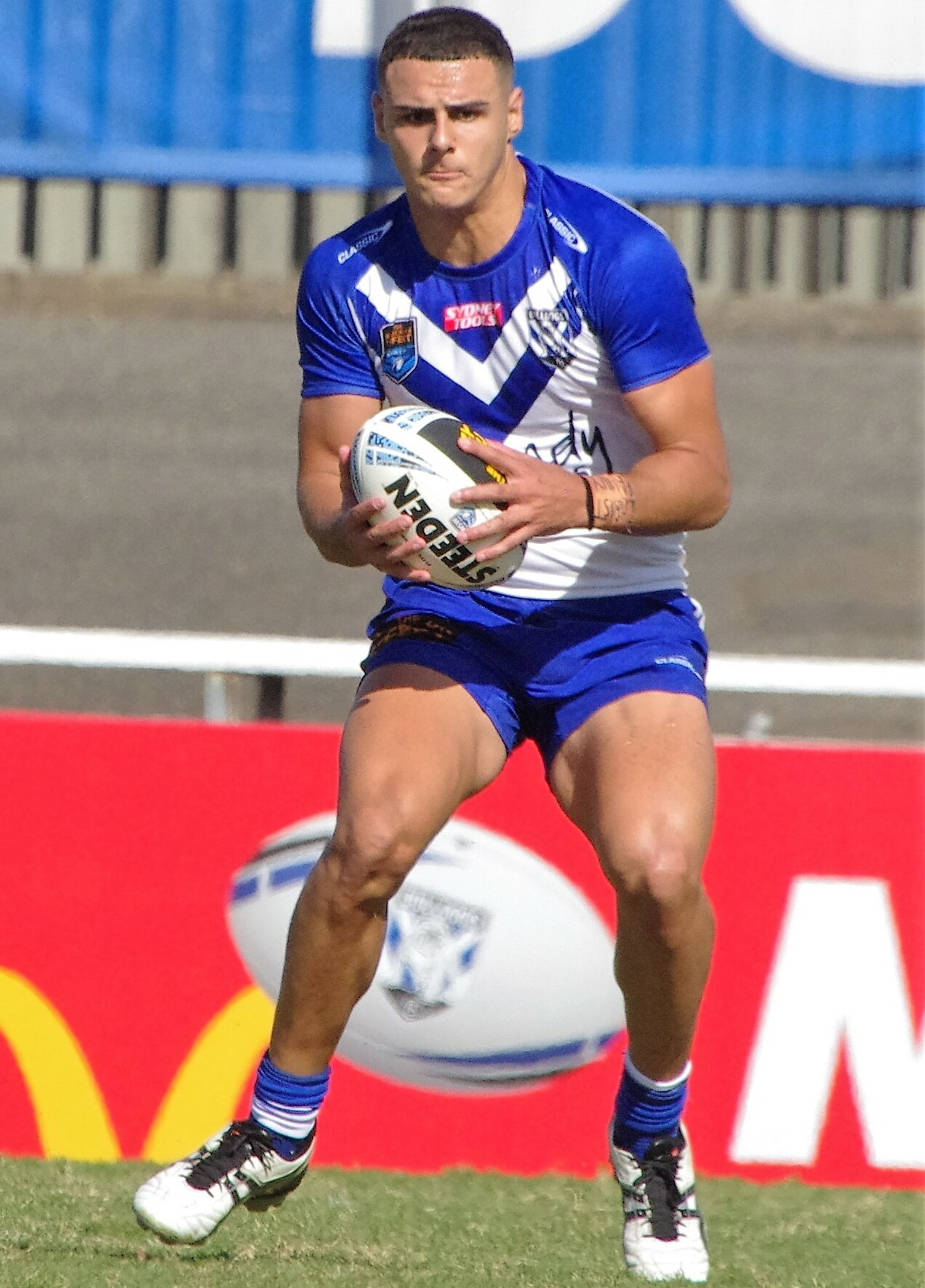

Personal information
- Born: 23 November 2001 (age 24) Sydney, New South Wales, Australia
- Height: 187 cm (6 ft 2 in)
- Weight: 92 kg (14 st 7 lb)

Playing information
- Position: Wing, Centre, Fullback
Club
Years	Team	Pld	T	G	FG	P
2022–	Canterbury Bulldogs	98	44	0	0	176
Representative
Years	Team	Pld	T	G	FG	P
2019–	Lebanon	7	1	0	0	4
2019	Lebanon 9s	1	0	0	0	0
- Source: As of 6 November 2026

Jacob Kiraz (born 23 November 2001) is a Lebanon international rugby league footballer who plays as a winger or centre for the Canterbury-Bankstown Bulldogs in the NRL.

== Background ==
Kiraz was born in Sydney, New South Wales, Australia, and is of Lebanese descent.

He played his junior rugby league for the Berala Bears and later St Johns Eagles.

Kiraz is a devout Maronite Catholic.

== Playing career ==
=== Early career ===
In 2015, Kiraz was a member of the Canterbury-Bankstown Bulldogs under-15 Summer Development Squad. In 2018, he was a member of the under-17 Winter Development squad. In November 2018, he was named in the St. George Dragons SG Ball Cup train-on squad. On 6 February 2019, he was named in the team's final squad, and played eight games and scored three tries during the season.

=== 2019 ===
In June, Kiraz signed a three-year contract with the North Queensland Cowboys, beginning in 2020.

On 22 June, at 17-years old, Kiraz made his international Test debut for Lebanon, coming off the bench in their 58–14 loss to Fiji at Leichhardt Oval. He set up his side's third try just two minutes after coming onto the field.

On 10 October, he was named in Lebanon's 2019 Rugby League World Cup 9s squad. Kiraz played just one game in the tournament before being disqualified for being under the age of 18. While the International Rugby League allows players 16 or older to play in Test matches, the National Rugby League, who ran the tournament, stipulates that you must be 18 to play. Kiraz would not turn 18 until November.

=== 2020 ===
In 2020, Kiraz moved to Townsville but played just one game for the Townsville Blackhawks Under-20s side before moving back to Sydney after the competition was cancelled due to the COVID-19 pandemic.

=== 2021 ===
In 2021, Kiraz joined the Newcastle Knights on an NRL development contract.

=== 2022 ===
After not being able to break through for an NRL debut at the Newcastle club, Kiraz returned to the Canterbury-Bankstown Bulldogs ahead of the 2022 season.

In round 7 of the 2022 NRL season, Kiraz made his NRL debut for Canterbury against Brisbane. He scored his first try in first grade the following week against the Wests Tigers.

In round 20, Kiraz scored a hat-trick in Canterbury's 24-10 victory over Newcastle.

Kiraz played 15 games for Canterbury in the 2022 season scoring six tries. The club would finish 12th on the table at the end of the season.

Kiraz would impress in the unfamiliar position of fullback for Lebanon during the Rugby League World Cup, scoring a try against Ireland as the Cedars made the quarter finals.

=== 2023 ===
In round 7 against arch-rivals Parramatta, Kiraz was taken from the field during the first half with a knee injury. Canterbury would go on to lose the match 30-4. Kiraz was later ruled out for three matches. Kiraz played a total of 19 matches for Canterbury in the 2023 NRL season as the club finished 15th on the table. On 24 October, Kiraz signed a contract extension to remain at Canterbury until the end of the 2027 season.

=== 2024 ===
Kiraz played 25 games for Canterbury in the 2024 NRL season and scored twelve tries as the club qualified for the finals. Kiraz played in their elimination finals loss against Manly.

=== 2025 ===
In round 9 of the 2025 NRL season, Kiraz scored a hat-trick in Canterbury's 38-18 victory over the hapless Gold Coast side. On 8 September, the Canterbury outfit announced that Kiraz had extended his contract until of the 2028 season. Kiraz played 19 games for Canterbury in the 2025 NRL season as the club finished third and qualified for the finals. Canterbury would be eliminated from the finals in straight sets.

=== 2026 ===
Kiraz played 20 matches for Canterbury in the 2026 NRL season as the club finished 12th on the table and missed the finals.

== Statistics ==
Year	Team	Games	Tries	Pts
2022	Canterbury-Bankstown Bulldogs	15	6	24
2023	Canterbury-Bankstown Bulldogs	19	6	24
2024	Canterbury-Bankstown Bulldogs	25	12	48
2025	Canterbury-Bankstown Bulldogs	19	11	44
2026	Canterbury-Bankstown Bulldogs	20	9	36
2027	Canterbury-Bankstown Bulldogs			
	Totals	98	44	176
