= 1935 Canterbury-Bankstown Bulldogs season =

Football season

- NSWRFL rank: 8th (out of 9)
- Play-off result: Missed Finals
- 1935 record: Wins: 2; draws: 0; losses: 14
- Points scored: For: 150; against: 660

Team information
- Captains: Jack Morrison; Tom Carey

Top scorers
- Tries: Vince Dwyer (4)
- Goals: George Main (29)
- Points: George Main (58)
| 1936 → |

The 1935 Canterbury-Bankstown season was the first in Canterbury's history. The club competed in the New South Wales Rugby Football League Premiership (NSWRFL), finishing 8th for the season.

== Ladder ==
| | Team | Pld | W | D | L | B | PF | PA | PD | Pts |
|---|---|---|---|---|---|---|---|---|---|---|
| 1 | Eastern Suburbs | 16 | 15 | 0 | 1 | 2 | 599 | 157 | +442 | 34 |
| 2 | South Sydney | 16 | 11 | 0 | 5 | 2 | 314 | 222 | +112 | 26 |
| 3 | Western Suburbs | 16 | 10 | 0 | 6 | 2 | 345 | 243 | +102 | 24 |
| 4 | North Sydney | 16 | 9 | 1 | 6 | 2 | 248 | 253 | -5 | 23 |
| 5 | Balmain | 16 | 8 | 1 | 7 | 2 | 320 | 225 | +95 | 21 |
| 6 | St. George | 16 | 8 | 0 | 8 | 2 | 334 | 162 | +172 | 20 |
| 7 | Newtown | 16 | 8 | 0 | 8 | 2 | 280 | 248 | +32 | 20 |
| 8 | Canterbury | 16 | 2 | 0 | 14 | 2 | 150 | 660 | -510 | 8 |
| 9 | University | 16 | 0 | 0 | 16 | 2 | 109 | 529 | -420 | 4 |

== Fixtures ==
| Round | Opponent | Result | Score | Date | Venue | Crowd | Ref |
|---|---|---|---|---|---|---|---|
| 1 | North Sydney | Loss | 5 – 20 | Thursday 25 April | North Sydney Oval | | |
| 2 | Souths Sydney | Loss | 9 – 37 | Saturday 27 April | Marrickville Oval | 4,000 | |
| 3 | Balmain | Loss | 5 – 44 | Saturday 4 May | Leichhardt Oval | | |
| 4 | Newtown | Loss | 14 – 22 | Monday 6 May | Marrickville Oval | | |
| 5 | St. George | Loss | 6 – 91 | Saturday 11 May | Earl Park, Arncliffe | | |
| 6 | Eastern Suburbs | Loss | 7 – 87 | Saturday 18 May | Sydney Sports Ground | | |
| 7 | BYE | | | | | | |
| 8 | University | Win | 21 – 2 | Saturday 22 June | Pratten Park | | |
| 9 | Western Suburbs | Loss | 19 – 25 | Saturday 29 June | Pratten Park | 2,000 | |
| 10 | North Sydney | Loss | 2 – 37 | Saturday 6 July | North Sydney Oval | | |
| 11 | Souths Sydney | Loss | 3 – 28 | Saturday 13 July | Sydney Sports Ground | | |
| 12 | Balmain | Loss | 7 – 39 | Saturday 20 July | Leichhardt Oval | | |
| 13 | Newtown | Loss | 9 – 49 | Saturday 27 July | Marrickville Oval | 1,000 | |
| 14 | St. George | Loss | 6 – 34 | Saturday 3 August | Earl Park, Arncliffe | | |
| 15 | Eastern Suburbs | Loss | 10 – 65 | Saturday 10 August | Pratten Park | 1,000 | |
| 16 | BYE | | | | | | |
| 17 | University | Win | 16 – 15 | Saturday 24 August | Marrickville Oval | | |
| 18 | Western Suburbs | Loss | 11 – 65 | Saturday 31 August | Pratten Park | 1,000 | |
