= EasyMarkets =

Privately held online brokerage firm

easyMarkets
- Formerly: Easy Forex
- Type: Private
- Industry: Financial services
- Founded: 2001
- Headquarters: Limassol, Cyprus
- Key people: Koula Lamprou (CEO)
- Services: Online trading in forex, CFDs, commodities, equities, cryptocurrencies
- Parent: Blue Capital Markets Ltd
- Website: www.easy-markets.com

easyMarkets (styled in lowercase; formerly Easy Forex) is a privately held online brokerage firm that offers trading in the foreign exchange market (forex) and contracts for difference (CFDs) on commodities, indices, equities, and cryptocurrencies. Founded in 2001, the company is headquartered in Limassol, Cyprus.

The easyMarkets group operates through entities regulated by the Cyprus Securities and Exchange Commission (CySEC), the Australian Securities & Investments Commission (ASIC), the Seychelles Financial Services Authority (FSA), the British Virgin Islands Financial Services Commission (FSC), and South Africa's Financial Sector Conduct Authority (FSCA). It previously operated under U.S. registration (2005–2013) and held authorisation in the United Kingdom, which was withdrawn in 2022.

easyMarkets has used sports sponsorships as part of its marketing, including a partnership with Real Madrid C.F.. It has also been involved in legal disputes, including litigation and a police investigation in Israel in the late 2000s and early 2010s in connection with allegations about its trading practices.

== History ==
easyMarkets was founded in 2001 under the name Easy Forex. The firm expanded to Australia in 2003. In 2005, it introduced a tool known as Freeze Rate, allowing users to lock in exchange rates briefly during volatile market periods.

In 2007, Easy Forex Trading Ltd received regulatory authorisation from CySEC under the MiFID framework. Easy Forex US Ltd also operated in the United States under NFA registration. In 2010, Easy Forex stopped serving U.S. retail clients. It withdrew its remaining NFA registrations in 2013 as capital requirements increased.

In January 2016, Easy Forex rebranded as easyMarkets as its product range expanded beyond forex. In the same year, it launched dealCancellation, a risk-management feature that allows clients to cancel a trade within a specified time window for a fee.

In subsequent years, the company expanded its offering to include CFDs on equities and digital assets. In 2018, easyMarkets discontinued its Poland operations following changes in leverage rules for retail CFD trading. In 2020, it obtained a license from the Seychelles FSA. It also entered a sponsorship arrangement with Real Madrid C.F. in 2020; the club announced that the partnership was renewed in December 2024.

In 2021, the broker launched a micro-bitcoin (μBTC) account. That same year, it added access to U.S. and European stocks through MetaTrader 4, integrated the TradingView platform, and obtained a license from the British Virgin Islands Financial Services Commission. In 2022, it expanded its MetaTrader 5 offering to include variable spreads, as well as additional cryptocurrency and equity instruments.

In June 2024, easyMarkets launched ai.easymarkets.com, described as an AI-based tool intended to assist users with market analysis. In August 2024, the firm received a license from the FSCA in South Africa. By 2025, easyMarkets reported offering over 275 instruments across multiple asset classes.

== Operations ==
easyMarkets is owned by Blue Capital Markets Ltd, a Cyprus-incorporated holding company. The group operates through multiple regulated entities, including Easy Forex Trading Ltd in Cyprus (authorised by CySEC) and easyMarkets Pty Ltd in Australia (an ASIC Australian Financial Services Licensee, AFSL 246566). The broker has also operated under offshore licensing arrangements in the Seychelles (FSA) and the British Virgin Islands (FSC), and received an operating licence from South Africa's FSCA in 2024. easyMarkets does not operate in the United States, having stopped serving U.S. retail clients in 2010 and withdrawn its remaining NFA registrations in 2013.

The company offers retail trading in foreign exchange and CFDs on commodities, indices, equities, and cryptocurrencies. Its platforms include a proprietary web interface and mobile applications, as well as MetaTrader 4 (MT4), MetaTrader 5 (MT5), and integration with TradingView. Since 2024, the company has also introduced an AI-powered tool to assist users with market analysis.

easyMarkets offers easyTrade, a simplified interface that allows users to set a predefined risk amount and potential payout without using margin or stop-loss settings. It also offers vanilla options trading on selected currency pairs and commodities.

The broker markets several risk-management features aimed at retail traders, including fixed spreads, guaranteed stop-loss orders on certain platforms, and negative balance protection. The dealCancellation function allows users to cancel a trade within a fixed time window after execution, subject to a fee.

In August 2025, easyMarkets' chief marketing officer, Garen Meserlian, moved into the chief operating officer role. In late November 2025, Koula Lamprou was appointed CEO, succeeding Nikos Antoniades.

== Sponsorships ==
EasyMarkets has used sports sponsorships and promotional campaigns as part of its marketing strategy.

In the early 2010s, the company (then branded as Easy Forex) sponsored the Canterbury-Bankstown Bulldogs of Australia's National Rugby League.

In August 2019, easyMarkets signed a three-year front-of-shirt sponsorship deal with the Spanish football club Real Betis Balompié. In September 2020, easyMarkets signed a three-year sponsorship agreement with Real Madrid C.F., becoming the club's official online trading partner. In December 2024, Real Madrid C.F. announced that the partnership had been renewed. The renewal came after Spain's Comisión Nacional del Mercado de Valores (CNMV) introduced measures restricting CFD advertising, brand promotion and sponsorships aimed at retail investors.

In 2024, easyMarkets announced the return of the xBar Cup for 2025, a freestyle football competition run by the broker as a promotional campaign.

== Legal matters ==
=== Israel lawsuits and investigation ===
In November 2007, Globes reported that a lawsuit against Easy Forex alleged that the company paid brokers incentives when clients lost money and penalised them when clients profited. The company said it warned customers about the risks of foreign exchange trading.

In June 2010, five former clients filed a lawsuit in Israel and sought class-action status, alleging, among other things, that the broker provided misleading investment guidance, manipulated price quotes and used employee incentives linked to client losses. Reports cited audio recordings made by a plaintiff who had briefly joined the company as an employee.

In 2011, Globes reported that the Israel Police were investigating allegations of fraud against Easy Forex in connection with a class action suit seeking NIS 500 million in damages, and that the plaintiffs argued the company profited from client losses. Finance Magnates reported that a criminal investigation had been opened after a customer complaint, but that police later notified the complainant the case had been closed for "lack of criminal guilt". The report said an appeal sought renewed enforcement and that police subsequently formed a task force to revisit the matter. In another lawsuit, two former customers (Benjamin Tiktuk and Arie Levy Dash) sued for NIS 2 million and said they had not been aware that Easy Forex acted as the counterparty to most transactions on its trading system.

In a 2014 overview, Finance Magnates described Easy Forex as repeatedly involved in Israeli litigation and cited Israeli press reporting about out-of-court settlements in some related proceedings. For example, according to Haaretz, a client (Dr. Dan Haronian) sued Easy Forex after losing about $500,000, and the matter was reported as having been settled out of court for roughly the same amount.

=== Trademark dispute with EasyGroup ===
In 2024, EasyGroup (associated with easyJet) brought trademark infringement and passing off proceedings in Ireland against Easy Forex Trading Limited and Blue Capital Markets Limited (trading as easyMarkets). The High Court declined jurisdiction, holding that Ireland was not the appropriate forum and that the evidence did not establish targeting of Irish consumers sufficient to ground the claim there, and the proceedings were dismissed without a decision on the merits of the trademark claim.
