= George Main =

George Main may refer to:

- George Washington Main (1807–1836), Alamo defender
- George Main (horse racing) (1879–1948), Australian pastoralist and horse breeder
- George Main (rugby league) (1910–1970), Australian rugby league footballer
