= Vic Dwyer =

Australian rugby league footballer

Personal information
- Full name: Victor Bede Dwyer
- Born: 5 April 1909 Murrurundi, New South Wales, Australia
- Died: 7 April 1968 (aged 59)

Playing information
- Position: Wing, Centre
Club
Years	Team	Pld	T	G	FG	P
1929	Western Suburbs	2	1	0	0	3
1930	Newtown	5	3	0	0	9
1935	Canterbury-Bankstown	10	4	0	0	12
	Total	17	8	0	0	24
- Source: As of 21 February 2019

Victor Bede Dwyer (5 April 1909 – 7 April 1968) was an Australian professional rugby league footballer who played in the 1920s and 1930s. Dwyer played for Western Suburbs, Canterbury-Bankstown and Newtown. Dwyer was a foundation player for Canterbury-Bankstown.

== Playing career ==
Dwyer made his first grade debut for Western Suburbs in Round 16 1929 against Glebe at Wentworth Park. In 1930, Dwyer signed for Newtown and played in 5 games for the club scoring 3 tries. After 4 years out of first grade, Dwyer signed with newly admitted side Canterbury-Bankstown.

Dwyer played for the club in their first ever game against North Sydney at North Sydney Oval which finished in a 20–5 loss.

Canterbury-Bankstown finished the 1935 season in second last position narrowly avoiding the wooden spoon which was handed to University but Dwyer did finish as the club's top try scorer with 4 tries.
