= Craig Polla-Mounter =

Australian rugby league footballer (born 1972)

Personal information
- Full name: Craig Polla-Mounter
- Born: 7 March 1972 (age 54) Melbourne, Victoria, Australia

Playing information
- Height: 5 ft 7 in (1.70 m)
- Weight: 12 st 9 lb (80 kg)
- Position: Halfback, Five-eighth
Club
Years	Team	Pld	T	G	FG	P
1992–01	Canterbury Bulldogs	192	41	0	4	168
Representative
Years	Team	Pld	T	G	FG	P
1993	NSW City	1	0	0	0	0

Craig Polla-Mounter (born 7 March 1972) is an Australian former professional rugby league footballer who played in the 1990s and 2000s for the Canterbury-Bankstown Bulldogs. He primarily played at halfback.

== Background ==
Polla-Mounter was born in Melbourne, Victoria, Australia, but he moved to Ipswich, Queensland at a young age. While attending Ipswich Grammar School, he went on two tours with the Australian Schoolboys rugby union team.

== Playing career ==
Polla-Mounter switched to rugby league in 1991, joining the Canterbury-Bankstown Bulldogs and playing in their premiership winning Presidents Cup side. Polla-Mounter made his first grade debut for the club in round 3 1992 against South Sydney at Belmore Oval.

He played at halfback in three grand finals for Canterbury-Bankstown, for two losses in 1994 and 1998 against the Canberra Raiders and the Brisbane Broncos, and one win in 1995 against Manly-Warringah.

In the 1998 NRL season, Polla-Mounter played 25 games as Canterbury finished 9th on the table and qualified for the finals. Canterbury proceeded to make the 1998 NRL Grand Final after winning 4 sudden death elimination matches in a row including the club's famous preliminary final victory over rivals Parramatta which is considered to be the greatest rugby league comeback of all time.

After being 18–2 down with less than 10 minutes remaining, Canterbury scored 3 tries to take the game into extra-time before winning the match 32–20. Also during the match was an infamous moment when Parramatta player Paul Carige elected to kick the ball back into the field of play with the siren sounding and the scores locked at 18-18. Polla-Mounter gathered the ball and attempted a field goal from the halfway line which just skimmed the under side of the crossbar.

In 2001, his final year in the NRL, Polla-Mounter was embroiled in a State of Origin eligibility tug-of-war. Despite being born in Victoria, Polla-Mounter grew up in Queensland, making him eligible for Queensland. Due to playing his first game of senior rugby league in Sydney for Canterbury, he was also eligible for New South Wales. In 1993, under the advice of then-Bulldogs boss, Peter Moore, Polla-Mounter played one game for City Origin. Although a push was made by Queensland to select Polla-Mounter in the 2001 series, he was never selected, with the NSWRL blocking the move Polla-Mounter later admitted he regretted playing for the City Origin side.

After his retirement from the NRL, Polla-Mounter returned to Queensland to play on the Sunshine Coast. In 2004, Polla-Mounter briefly returned to the Bulldogs, playing for their Premier League side before injury forced him to again retire.
