= Paul Carige =

Australian rugby league footballer

Personal information
- Full name: Paul Jeffery Carige
- Born: 5 August 1973 (age 53) Brisbane, Queensland, Australia
- Height: 187 cm (6 ft 2 in)
- Weight: 102 kg (16 st 1 lb)

Playing information
- Position: Fullback, Centre, Wing
Club
Years	Team	Pld	T	G	FG	P
1996	Illawarra Steelers	16	1	0	0	4
1997–98	Parramatta Eels	45	13	0	0	52
1999	Salford City Reds	27	7	0	0	28
	Total	88	21	0	0	84

Paul Carige (born 5 August 1973) is an Australian former rugby league footballer who played in the 1990s. He played for the Illawarra Steelers, Parramatta Eels, and the Salford City Reds. He mostly played at centre, but occasionally he played the odd game at fullback or wing.

== Playing career ==
Carige made his first-grade début for the Illawarra Steelers in round 2 of the 1996 season, an 18–10 loss to the Auckland Warriors at Ericsson Stadium. He played 16 games and scored one try in his début season.

In 1997, Carige joined the Parramatta Eels. The 1997 season also saw the recruitment of a new coach, former Illawarra Steelers and St. George Dragons mentor Brian Smith. Smith's appointment saw a reversal in the club's fortunes, taking the Parramatta club from being perennial easybeats (not having made a finals appearance since their last premiership win in 1986) to title contenders, although the club lost both of their finals matches that year to the Newcastle Knights and the North Sydney Bears in weeks 1 and 2 of the finals series respectively. In 1998, the Parramatta side went even closer to breaking their premiership drought, going within one game of making their first Grand Final appearance since 1986.

Carige is probably best remembered for his poor performance in Parramatta's 32–20 extra-time loss to arch-rivals the Bulldogs in the 1998 preliminary final at the Sydney Football Stadium. With just 11 minutes remaining, Parramatta had a commanding 18–2 lead, and looked like inevitable victors, but three quick tries to Craig Polla-Mounter, Rod Silva and Willie Talau saw the Bulldogs side draw level at 18-all. As the full-time siren sounded and the Bulldogs’ Corey Hughes missed a long-range field goal attempt that rolled into Parramatta's in-goal area, Carige stepped onto his own dead-ball line and attempted to ground the ball, believing this would allow a 20-metre tap restart for his team. However, because the ball was deemed to have stopped rolling as he grounded it, Parramatta were forced to make a goal-line dropout instead, returning possession to Canterbury and gifting them one more chance to win the game. Carige then retrieved another missed field-goal attempt from Robert Relf as the full-time siren sounded and inexplicably kicked the ball away from his own 10-metre line straight to Bulldogs' fullback Rod Silva, who handed it off to five-eighth Craig Polla-Mounter. Polla-Mounter immediately made an attempt at kicking a field goal from just inside the half-way line and almost stole the match in regular time, with the ball only narrowly missing by passing under the crossbar. In extra-time, Carige then twice caught the ball from a poor Bulldogs kick, on both occasions deep in his own territory, only to inadvertently take it into touch, further hampering his side's chances. In commentary for Channel Nine, caller and Parramatta Eels legend Peter Sterling described Carige as having “made some of the dumbest plays I have ever seen in a game of rugby league.” The Bulldogs went on to win the match 32–20, and would subsequently qualify for the 1998 NRL Grand Final against the Brisbane Broncos the following week. Despite being contracted with the Parramatta club until the end of the 1999 season, Carige's stint with the club ended after this match. In his two seasons with the Eels, he had played 45 games and scored 13 tries, but after the preliminary final loss, Carige was forced to flee Sydney for Coffs Harbour after receiving abuse from people wherever he went and further bullying from disgruntled fans over the internet.

In 1999, Carige joined an English Super League side, the Salford City Reds. After playing 27 games and scoring seven tries for the Reds, Carige left Salford at the end of the 1999 Super League season.

In 2000, Carige played for the Newtown Jets in the NSW Cup competition. Carige then returned to Queensland, where he went on to play for the Wynnum-Manly Seagulls in the Queensland Cup and then captain/coached the Fassifern Bombers in the local Ipswich Rugby League competition in 2005.

In November 2018, Carige unexpectedly made a comeback after several years in hiding, taking to the field for Parramatta in the Legends of League tournament.
