= Canterbury-Bankstown Bulldogs =

Australian rugby league club

Club information
- Full name: Canterbury Bankstown Bulldogs Rugby League Club Limited
- Nickname(s): Berries, Blue and Whites, Dogs, Doggies, Animal, Dogs of War, The Family Club, The Entertainers
- Short name: BUL, CBY
- Colours: Blue; White
- Founded: 1935; 91 years ago
- Website: bulldogs.com.au

Current details
- Grounds: Stadium Australia (5); Belmore Sports Ground (0)
- Chairman: Adam Driussi
- Coach: Cameron Ciraldo (NRL) Brayden Wiliame (NRLW)
- Manager: Phil Gould
- Captain: Stephen Crichton (NRL); Tayla Preston & Angelina Teakaaranga-Katoa (NRLW)
- Competition: National Rugby League
- 2026 Season: 12th
- Current season

Uniforms
Home colours	Away colours

Records
- Premierships: 8 (1938, 1942, 1980, 1984, 1985, 1988, 1995, 2004)
- Runners-up: 10 (1940, 1947, 1967, 1974, 1979, 1986, 1994, 1998, 2012, 2014)
- Minor premierships: 8 (1938, 1942, 1947, 1984, 1993, 1994, 2012)
- NSW Cup: 10 (1939, 1971, 1972, 1980, 1998, 2000, 2002, 2010, 2011, 2018)
- NRL State Championship: 1 (2018)
- Wooden spoons: 6 (1943, 1944, 1964, 2002, 2008, 2021)
- Most capped: 317 – Hazem El Masri
- Highest try scorer: 159 – Hazem El Masri
- Highest points scorer: 2418 – Hazem El Masri

The Canterbury-Bankstown Bulldogs are an Australian professional rugby league club based in Belmore, a suburb in the Canterbury-Bankstown region of Sydney. They compete in the NRL Telstra Premiership, as well as competitions facilitated by the New South Wales Rugby League, including the NSW Cup, the Jersey Flegg Cup, NSWRL Women's Premiership, Tarsha Gale Cup, S. G. Ball Cup and the Harold Matthews Cup.

The club was admitted to the New South Wales Rugby Football League premiership, predecessor of the current NRL competition, in 1935. They won their first premiership in their fourth year of competition with another soon after, and after spending the 1950s and most of the 1960s on the lower rungs went through a very strong period in the 1980s, winning four premierships in that decade. The club won the first National premiership in 1995, but would defect to Super League in 1997 during the Super League war. They would return in 1998 for the first NRL season, where they have played since.

Known in 1995 as the Sydney Bulldogs, they reverted to the Canterbury-Bankstown Bulldogs until 1999 before changing their name to the geographically indistinct The Bulldogs before reverting again in 2009 to their current name. The club has won 8 premierships, with their most recent premiership in 2004. In 2012, they won their most recent minor premiership. They last played in a Grand Final in 2014 losing to South Sydney. They are commonly referred to as Canterbury, the Bulldogs or just the Dogs.

== History ==
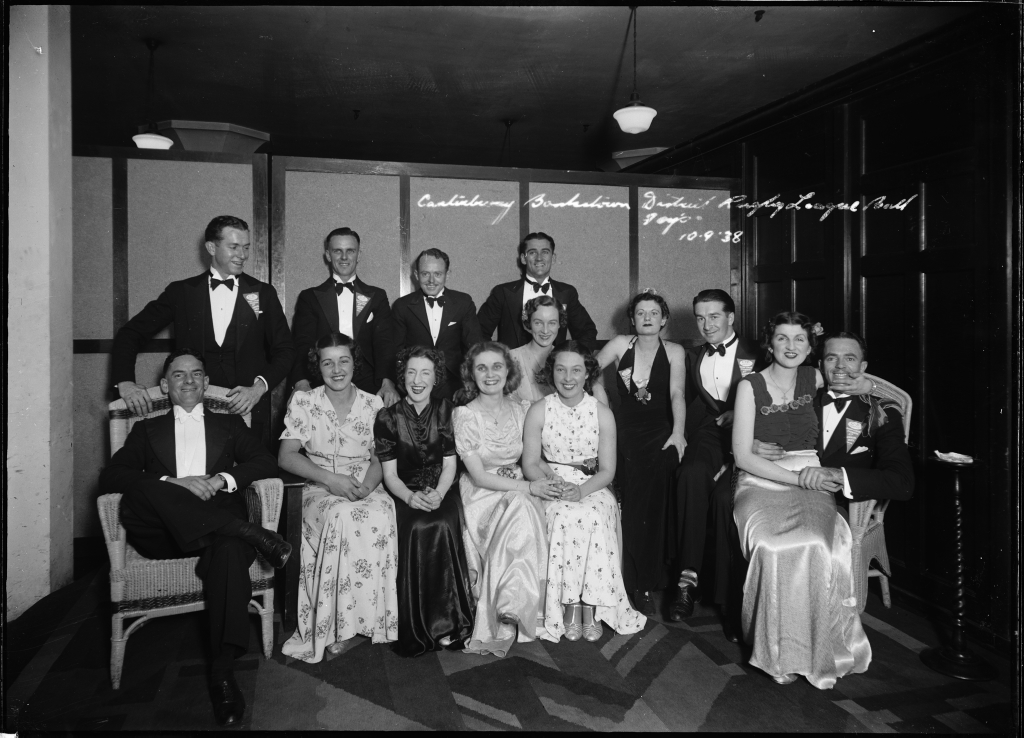
The third annual Club Ball, 1938, from the Tom Lennon collection, courtesy of the Powerhouse Museum

In 1935—thirteen years after a meeting above "The Ideal Milk Bar" in Campsie led to the creation of the Canterbury-Bankstown Junior Rugby League—the Canterbury club was admitted into the elite New South Wales Rugby Football League premiership. It took the new club, nicknamed "Country Bumpkins" because of their rural recruiting and CB emblem, four years to win their first premiership in 1938. The grand final-winning effort was repeated in 1942 before a 38-year premiership drought.

In 1967, having ended the 11-year premiership reign of St. George by defeating them in the final, "The Berries" (as they were known at the time) lost to South Sydney in the grand final. But the return to the top end of the table set the scene for off-field restructuring that laid the foundations for the club to become one of the most consistent achievers in the remaining decades of the 20th century.

In 1978, Canterbury became known as "The Bulldogs". Nicknames such as "Cantabs" "CBs" and "Berries" were seen to be "soft" and the club wanted something to signify determination and grit. The new name and logo was purchased from a local Sydney Liquor Store owner Bill Caralis. A grand final appearance in 1979, followed by a grand final win in 1980 with a young, enthusiastic and free-running side dubbed "The Entertainers", was the beginning of a golden era that was to produce three more grand final wins in the 1980s: 1984, 1985 and 1988.

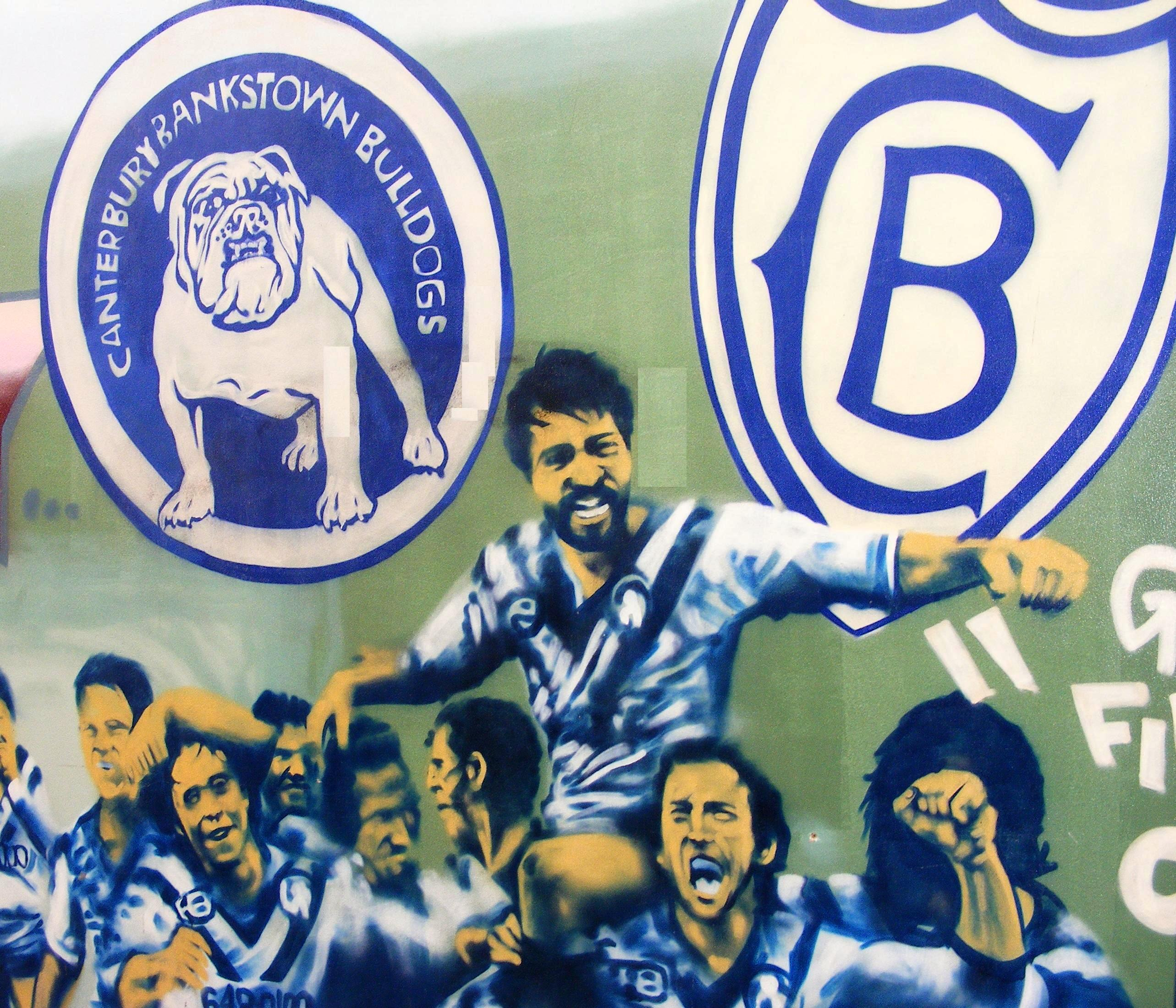
1980 NRL Grand Final artwork

During the mid-1990s' Super League war, Canterbury aligned themselves with the Super League competition, playing in the 1997 premiership season. In 1998 the Bulldogs came close to adding another premiership trophy after qualifying for the grand final where they met the Brisbane Broncos and lost 38–12. On the way to the 1998 Grand Final, Canterbury had two come-from-behind wins. The first was against the Newcastle Knights in the third week of the finals—behind 16–0 in the second half, they fought back to 16 all at full time and went on to win in extra time. A week later they trailed arch rivals Parramatta in the preliminary final by 16 points with 9 minutes remaining. Three tries and a conversion from the sideline by Daryl Halligan in the final minutes got them back level at 18 all and send the game into extra-time. Canterbury eventually went on to win 32–20 in one of the greatest finals comebacks in the history of the game.

Chart of yearly table positions for Canterbury-Bankstown Bulldogs in First Grade Rugby League

Following indifferent form in 1999, 2000 and 2001 where they had varying levels of success, the club was found to have systematically and deliberately breached the NRL salary cap in 2002 (for the 2001–02 seasons), and was penalised all 37 competition points which it had amassed up to that point for 2002. This resulted in the club falling from first to last place on the ladder, and at the end of the season the Bulldogs received their first "wooden spoon" (a reference to the club which finishes last in the competition) since 1964.

The Bulldogs returned to finals contention in 2003; however, they fell one step short of yet another grand final after losing to the Roosters 28–18 in the preliminary final.

The club went through some off-field dramas in 2004, the most serious of which included rape allegations during a pre-season match in Coffs Harbour. The team managed to focus on football and triumphed when they held out the Sydney Roosters 16–13 with a try-saving tackle by Andrew Ryan in the dying seconds of the 2004 Grand Final. The game was to be the last for departing captain Steve Price, but he missed the match due to a leg injury. Price is now taking over at the club as the General Manager of Football, this position becoming effective in 2020 as he looks to turn the club's fortunes around to that of 2004.

2005 saw Canterbury unable to mount a serious defence of their premiership title as injuries and contract negotiations saw the year start and finish on a sour note for the club. Due to the extent of injuries suffered, the team was under-strength for most of the year. This took its toll in the final six weeks of the season, with the club suffering successive heavy losses and missing the finals series. In 2006, little was expected from the club after a poor 2005 season, but despite some doubt over the strength of their side, Canterbury's forward pack helped them to a better than expected result for the year, finishing a game short of the grand final, losing to eventual premiers the Brisbane Broncos. Inconsistency and a poor finish to the 2007 season meant Canterbury were knocked out of the finals in week two.

In 2008, having already lost Mark O'Meley to the Sydney Roosters, Willie Mason left the club. Further into the off-season Canterbury-Bankstown also lost halfback Brent Sherwin, and prospects for the 2008 NRL season began to look dim. Although they recorded at the start of the season a couple of victories, the injury toll and the departure Sonny Bill Williams mid-season demoralised the club and players, and the Canterbury club earned their second wooden spoon of the decade.

Another source of discontent in 2008 was the battle for election to the football club board. Many contenders believed that the board of the time was steering the club in the wrong direction, particularly then-CEO Malcolm Noad. New members were elected to the board early in 2008, and later in the season Noad resigned as CEO. His replacement as head of the football club was Todd Greenberg.

Greenberg's influence became apparent during the 2009 season. Premiership-winning coach Steve Folkes was replaced with his assistant Kevin Moore. The purchases of several key players, including former Melbourne and Cronulla playmaker Brett Kimmorley changed Canterbury from a poorly run and poorly performing club to one of the best clubs both on and off the field in 2009. Canterbury finished second in the regular season (losing the minor premiership to the St. George Illawarra Dragons due to a loss of two competition points for an interchange breach against Penrith in Round 2), and players and officials took out a number of Dally M awards. 2009 was also the final season for Hazem El Masri, who became the highest all-time pointscorer in Australian rugby league history with a penalty goal in the Bulldogs' Round 1 match against the Manly Warringah Sea Eagles.

From 2010, Canterbury returned to the name Canterbury-Bankstown Bulldogs. The Canterbury club celebrated its 75th anniversary in 2010.

In the 2012 NRL season, Canterbury finished first on the competition ladder to take out their first minor premiership since 1994. They made it to the grand final, losing to Melbourne 14–4.

In May 2013, former Netball New Zealand chief executive Raelene Castle was appointed CEO, the first female in the NRL's history. They finished the regular season sixth on the ladder and bowed out in the semi-final.

In 2014, Canterbury made history by winning three consecutive games by one point, from Round 5 to Round 7. They finished runners up to South Sydney in the 2014 NRL Grand Final. Canterbury reached the grand final after winning three sudden death finals matches against Melbourne, Manly-Warringah and Penrith.

On 10 August 2017, Canterbury announced Rugby League World Cup CEO Andrew Hill as the replacement for outgoing boss Raelene Castle. On the appointment, chairman Ray Dib noted that "Andrew was appointed from a very strong list of candidates and has exceptional experience in the game of rugby league."

In September 2017, Canterbury announced that former premiership winning player Dean Pay would be the new coach at the club starting in 2018.

The 2018 NRL season started off badly for Canterbury with the club only winning 3 of its first 10 matches. In May 2018, the new Canterbury board admitted that they would not be able to make any major signings until the end of the 2021 season due to the salary cap drama engulfing the club. The issue with the salary cap problems involved the previous administration and former coach Des Hasler who signed numerous players on back ended deals. In the wake of the scandal, the club was forced to offload players to free up room in the cap. This resulted in Moses Mbye departing for the Wests Tigers and star recruit Aaron Woods being sold to Cronulla after only signing with Canterbury months prior. On 16 June 2018, Canterbury suffered a humiliating 32–10 loss to the Gold Coast Titans at Belmore, in the press conference coach Dean Pay said "Physically, we just weren't good enough. The way they turned up, the way they trained during the week wasn't good enough, I feel sorry for the fans". On 20 July 2018, Canterbury played against arch rivals Parramatta in what the media had dubbed as the "Spoon Bowl" with both sides sitting at the bottom of the ladder. There were fears before the game that the match would attract the lowest NRL crowd in over 20 years. Parramatta went on to win the match 14–8. After the defeat by Parramatta, Canterbury were facing the prospect of finishing with the wooden spoon for the first time since 2008 but over the coming four weeks the club managed to pull off upset wins against the Wests Tigers, the Brisbane Broncos and St. George to finish the season in 12th place. The lower grades of Canterbury performed better in 2018 with the club winning the NSW Cup, defeating Newtown 18–12 in the final and also winning the NRL State Championship defeating Redcliffe 42–18.

Canterbury started off the 2019 NRL season losing their two first games in convincing fashion against the Warriors and rivals Parramatta. Due to the bad start to the season, there were rumours that coach Dean Pay would be relieved of his duties but he was then granted a 12-month contract extension to remain as Canterbury coach until the end of 2020.

By the mid of the 2019 season, Canterbury found themselves sitting last on the table and in real danger of finishing with the wooden spoon. However, for the third straight season, Canterbury achieved four upset victories in a row over Penrith, the Wests Tigers, South Sydney and Parramatta who were all competing for a place in the finals series and were higher on the table. Pay was credited with the late season revival as the side focused heavily on defence.

In the 2020 NRL season, Canterbury were defeated in both of their opening fixtures. The season was then temporarily postponed. Following the season resumption, they were defeated by Manly-Warringah at Central Coast Stadium. They then defeated the St George Illawarra Dragons 22–2 at Western Sydney Stadium. After round 9, they have not won a game. They were defeated in round 9 by the Brisbane Broncos at Lang Park 26–8. The speculation that then Head Coach Dean Pay would be sacked grew. By Tuesday 14 July 2020, Canterbury released a statement saying that Pay had resigned from his position. In this statement, the club announced that Pay's assistant coach Steve Georgallis would take over the role. Following this, it was reported that Dean's other assistant, Steve Antonelli, also resigned from his position. The clubs NSW Cup head coach Brad Henderson would fill in as Georgallis's assistant coach.

On Wednesday 22 July 2020, the club announced that they had secured the services of former Manly Warringah Sea Eagles head coach and current (at 22 July 2020) Penrith Panthers assistant coach, Trent Barrett to coach the club from the start of season 2021 on a three-year deal.

Canterbury finished the 2020 NRL season in 15th place on the table after a horror year on and off the field. Canterbury finished on equal points with Brisbane but avoided the wooden spoon due to a slightly better for and against record.

Canterbury started the 2021 NRL season poorly losing their opening three matches including being kept scoreless in round 2 & round 3 against Penrith and Brisbane respectively. This was the first time in the club's history that this had occurred. In round 4 of the 2021 NRL season, Canterbury were defeated 38-0 by South Sydney in the traditional Good Friday game. Canterbury became only the second team in the NRL era to lose three straight games without scoring a point after Cronulla who achieved this in the 2014 NRL season.

It was also the worst start to a season by any team since Glebe in the 1928 NSWRFL season who managed to only score 12 points in their first four matches. On 30 June 2021, Canterbury were fined $50,000 by the NRL after failing to communicate the increased COVID restrictions to players. The incident was in relation to five Canterbury players visiting Sydney's Eastern Suburbs which was a COVID-19 hotspot.

In round 16 of the 2021 NRL season, Canterbury suffered their third heaviest defeat in club history losing 66–0 to Manly-Warringah at Western Sydney Stadium.

In round 22 of the 2021 NRL season, Canterbury were handed their sixth wooden spoon after losing 24–10 against the Warriors. Canterbury needed to win the match and their remaining three fixtures to avoid finishing last.

Despite a number of off-season recruits, Canterbury started the 2022 NRL season poorly winning only two of their first ten matches. On 16 May 2022, Canterbury head coach Trent Barrett resigned from his position with the club sitting bottom of the table. On 18 May 2022, Michael Potter was named as interim coach of the Canterbury-Bankstown Bulldogs after the resignation of Barrett. Under Potter, the club won five of their last 14 matches to avoid the wooden spoon by finishing 12th.

In round 18 of the 2023 NRL season, Canterbury suffered their equal third worst loss as a club when they were defeated 66-0 by Newcastle. Canterbury would finish the 2023 NRL season in 15th place. The club also finished with the worst for and against out of all 17 teams with a -331 points differential.

In the 2024 NRL season, Canterbury qualified for the finals finishing 6th on the table. This was the first time in eight years that the club had managed to achieve this. However, they lost their elimination finals match 24-22 against Manly at Stadium Australia.

Canterbury started the 2025 NRL season in great form winning their opening six games and equalling their best start to a campaign since 1938. In round 8, the club suffered their first loss of the year against Brisbane which ended with a score line of 42-18. Canterbury affirmed their premiership credentials in round 10, registering their biggest comeback since 2001, winning 32-20 from 20-0 down at half-time, away at the Canberra Raiders, who went on to be the season's Minor Premiers. Other notable wins came in Round 11 against the Sydney Roosters, and in round 21 against Manly, where Canterbury defeated them 42-4 at Sydney Football Stadium (2022) as they commemorated their 1995 Premiership triumph. Following a 28-4, round 26 victory over the Penrith Panthers, Canterbury confirmed their spot in the Top Four for the 2025 season. Locking in a 3rd place finish, Canterbury achieved their first Top Four finish since their Minor Premiership in 2012. The club would lose their two finals matches against Melbourne and Penrith as they were eliminated from the finals in straight sets. The year was highlighted by the ongoing saga with new recruit Lachlan Galvin who signed mid-season from the Wests Tigers with starting halfback Toby Sexton being replaced by Galvin in the team along with hooker Reed Mahoney being told he was free to leave at the end of 2025.

In the 2026 NRL season, Canterbury started off as one of the favourites to make the finals and challenge for the premiership. In round 6, the club defeated Penrith 32-16 which reaffirmed them as one of the favourites to win the title but they would then lose their next five matches in a row. To round out the year the club would lose four of their last five matches to finish 12th on the table.

== Name and emblem ==
The name and emblem of the club has changed several times over its history. At the club's foundation in 1935, it was known only as 'Canterbury-Bankstown', without an animal mascot. The nicknames 'Berries' and 'C-Bs' (or, derisively, 'Country Bumpkins') were often used informally, 'C-Bs' being used from the outset and 'Berries' coming into use by the mid-1940s. The club had been referred to as the 'Bulldogs' as early as 1977. In 1978, the Bulldog mascot and name was adopted, with the club becoming known as the 'Canterbury-Bankstown Bulldogs'. This was the name used throughout the team's 1980s glory era. In 1995 the club name was changed to 'Sydney Bulldogs', reflecting a similar change by Eastern Suburbs (to 'Sydney City Roosters'). The name changed again in 1996, returning to 'Canterbury Bulldogs' with 'Bankstown' omitted, and yet again in 2000, to the geographically indistinct 'Bulldogs'by the commencement of the NRL. Bob Hagan, the club boss at the time of the 1998 change, explained that the dropping of the name 'Canterbury' was intended to broaden the appeal of the club outside of its traditional supporter base, so that the club could attract a geographically diverse following like Manchester United or the Chicago Bulls. Despite the name change, some supporters, as well as many television and radio commentators, continued to refer to the club as 'Canterbury'. In 2009, board officials voted for the club to return to 'Canterbury-Bankstown Bulldogs' from the 2010 season onwards.

The initial crest was a 'CB' in a shield. The adoption of the 'Bulldogs' name and mascot took place in 1978. There have been four main versions of the mascot logo. The first, which featured a snarling bulldog inside a circle, was replaced in 1998 by a more 'cartoonish' logo of a bulldog's head. This then followed up with a return to an updated version of the 1978 logo in 2010.

In 2009, the club announced that the logo would be changing again, and asked members to vote on which of two similar proposed logos would be used from 2010. The rationale for the logo change was to celebrate the club's 75th anniversary in 2010 and to better reflect the club's "true essence and history". Two months later, the new design was unveiled, with the official change of logo taking place in November 2009. The logo returned to the standing bulldog of the 1978–1997 logo, although no longer snarling. It also referenced elements of the club's history by incorporating the 'C-B' emblem, the club's year of foundation (1935), and the blue and white 'V' design which has featured on many of the club's jerseys over the years. The change of name from 'Bulldogs' to 'Canterbury-Bankstown Bulldogs' took place after.

In October 2025, the Bulldogs announced the introduction of a refreshed club logo. The updated emblem was designed to reflect the club’s history while modernising its visual identity. According to the club, the redesign drew inspiration from elements of previous logos and was created with a digital-first approach.

Canterbury Bankstown Bulldogs – Logos

1935–1977

== Colours ==
The Bulldogs have played in predominantly blue and white strip since the club entered the league in 1935. The only exception to this was during the Second World War, when rationing meant they had to wear a maroon jersey with a blue 'V'.

There have been four basic strip designs since the club's inception in the top-flight league competition:

- The irregular ("butcher stripes") stripes design – used from 1935 until 1962. This design had blue and white irregular stripes worn with black shorts. The irregular strip has been used recently in occasional 'heritage' matches (e.g. Heritage round in 2008 vs St. George Illawarra)
- Maroon with Blue V - used from 1943 until 1945 during the war. Due to the war effort, dye was in limited supply. Teams were asked to avoid stripes to conserve dye. This jersey design has been seen as 'unlucky' by fans.
- The 'V Strip' – used between 1963 and 1969, and revived in 1973. White shirt with blue V, blue shorts. The current "away" strip has blue shorts, but features a blue shirt with white V.
- Blue & White hoops - From 1970 to 1972, the club adopted a jersey featuring blue and white hoops. This reverted to the 'V Strip' from 1973 onwards.
Canterbury Bankstown Bulldogs – home jerseys

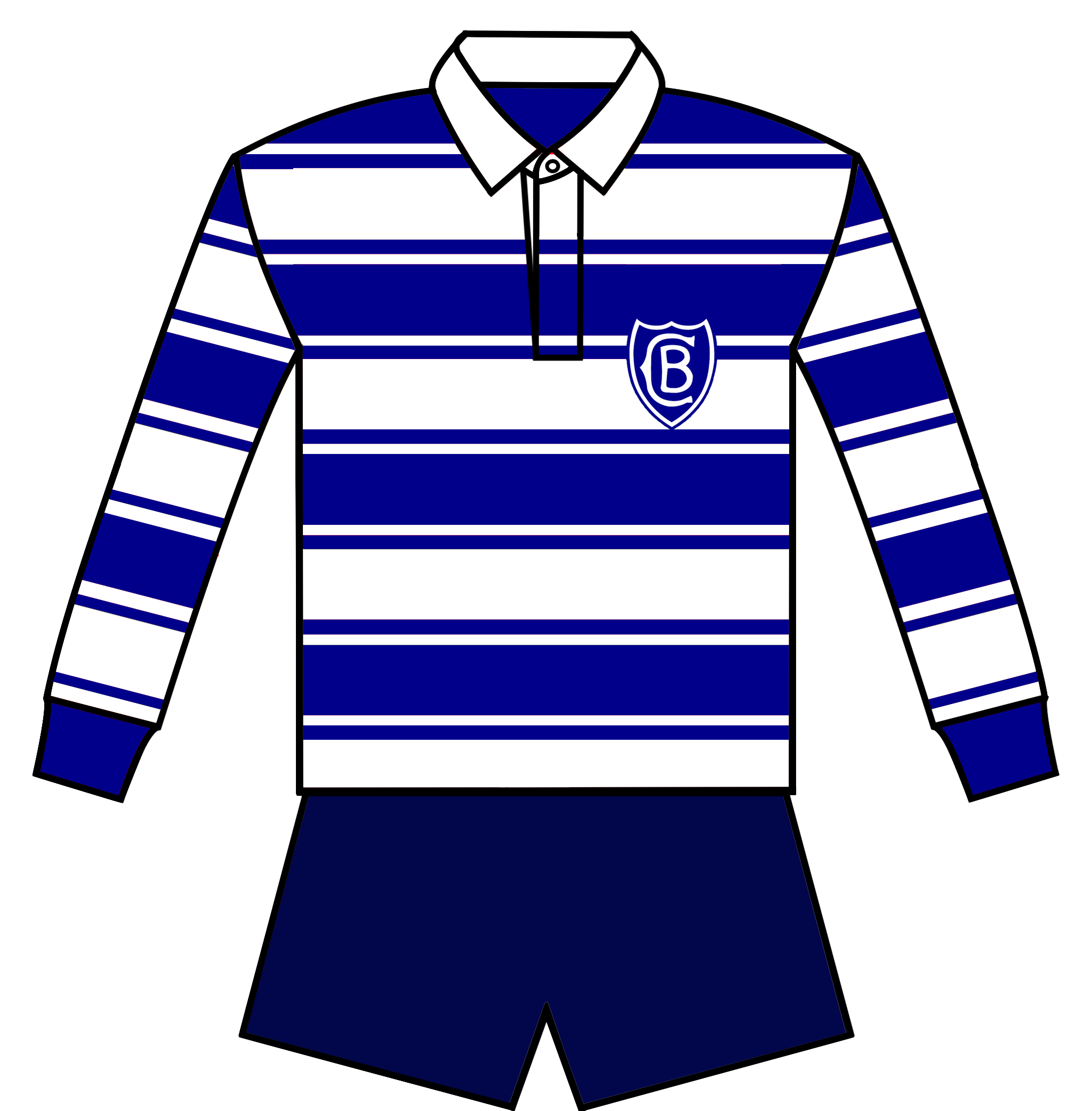
1935–1942

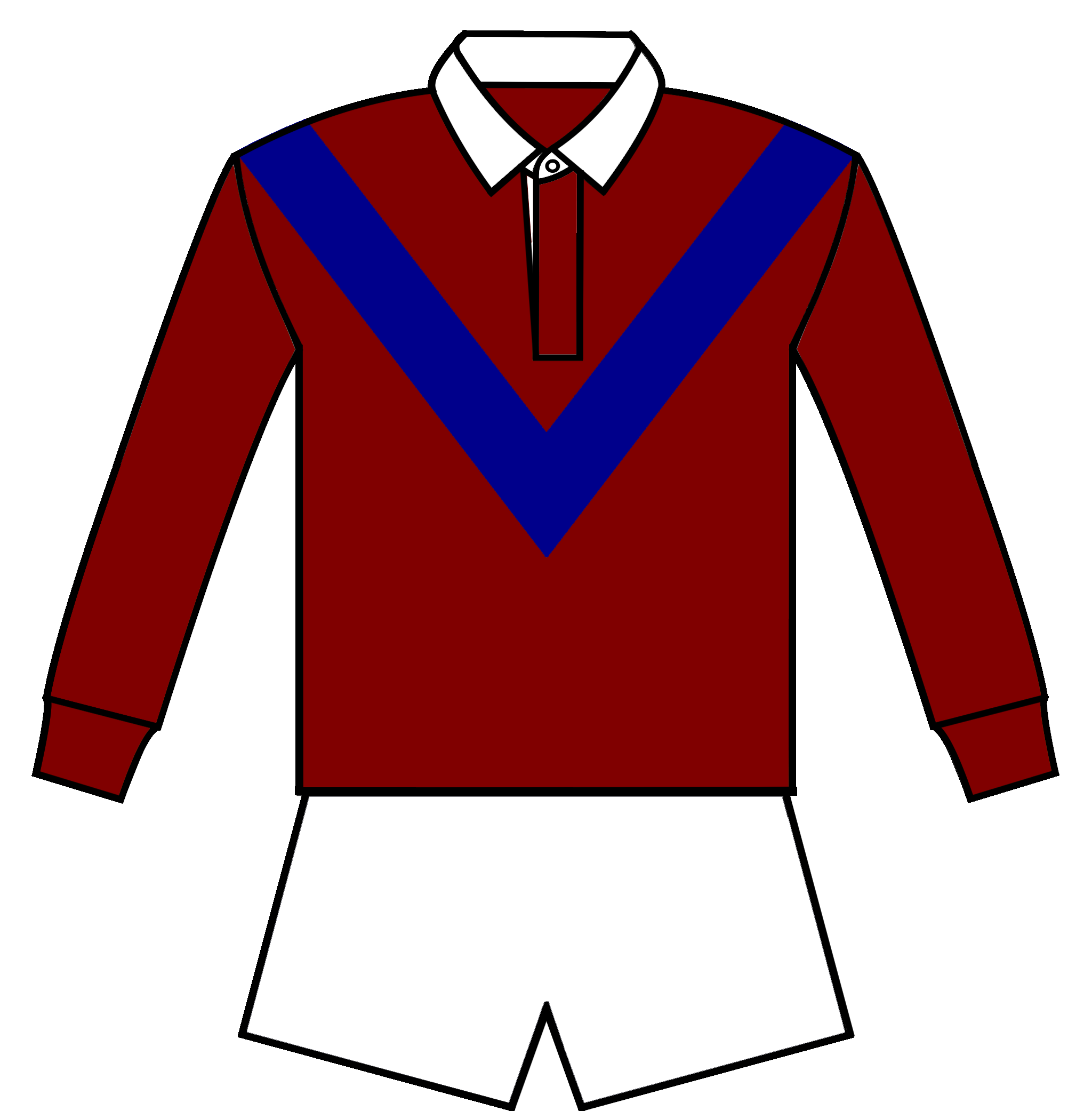
1943–1945

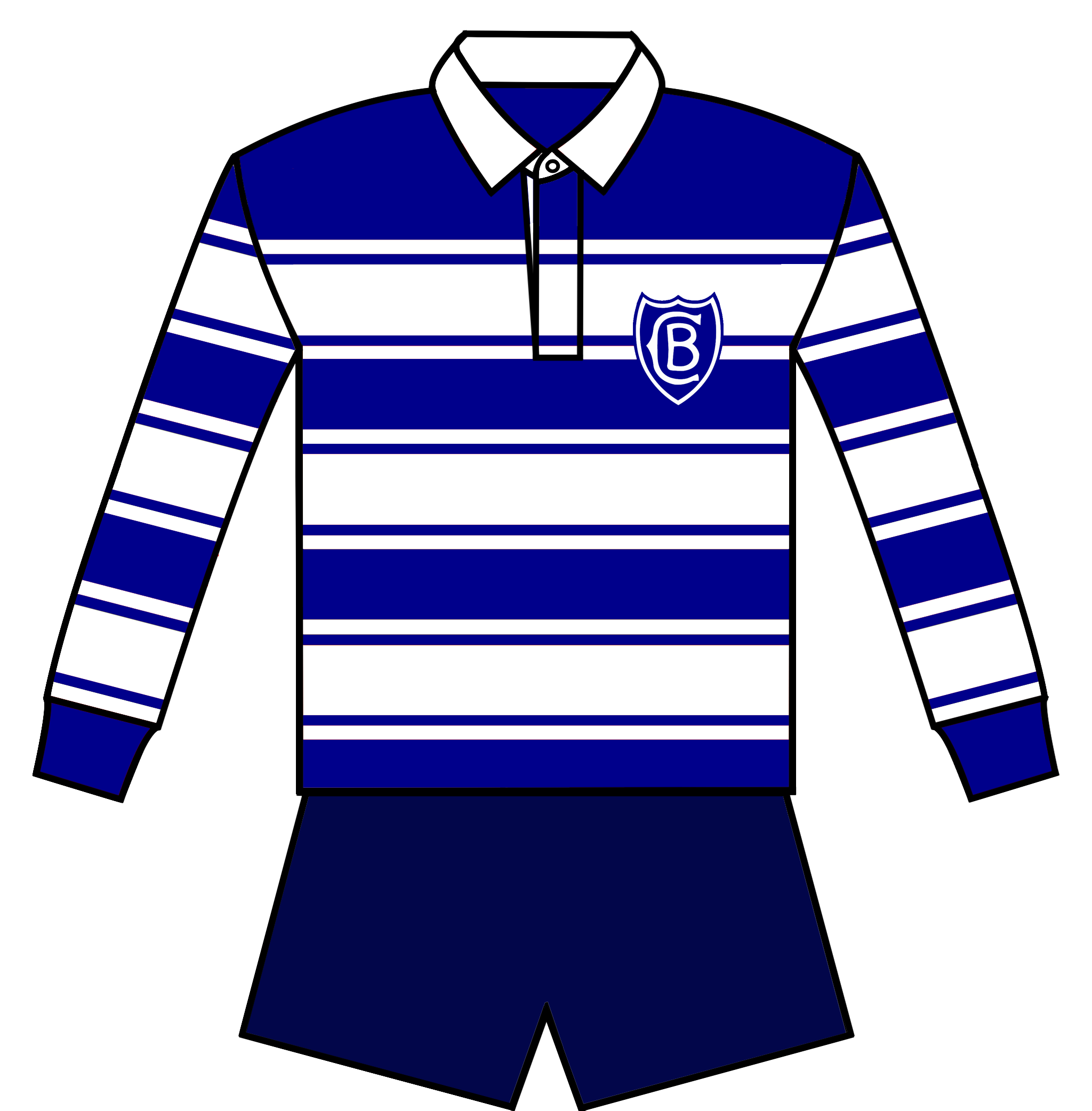
1946–1962

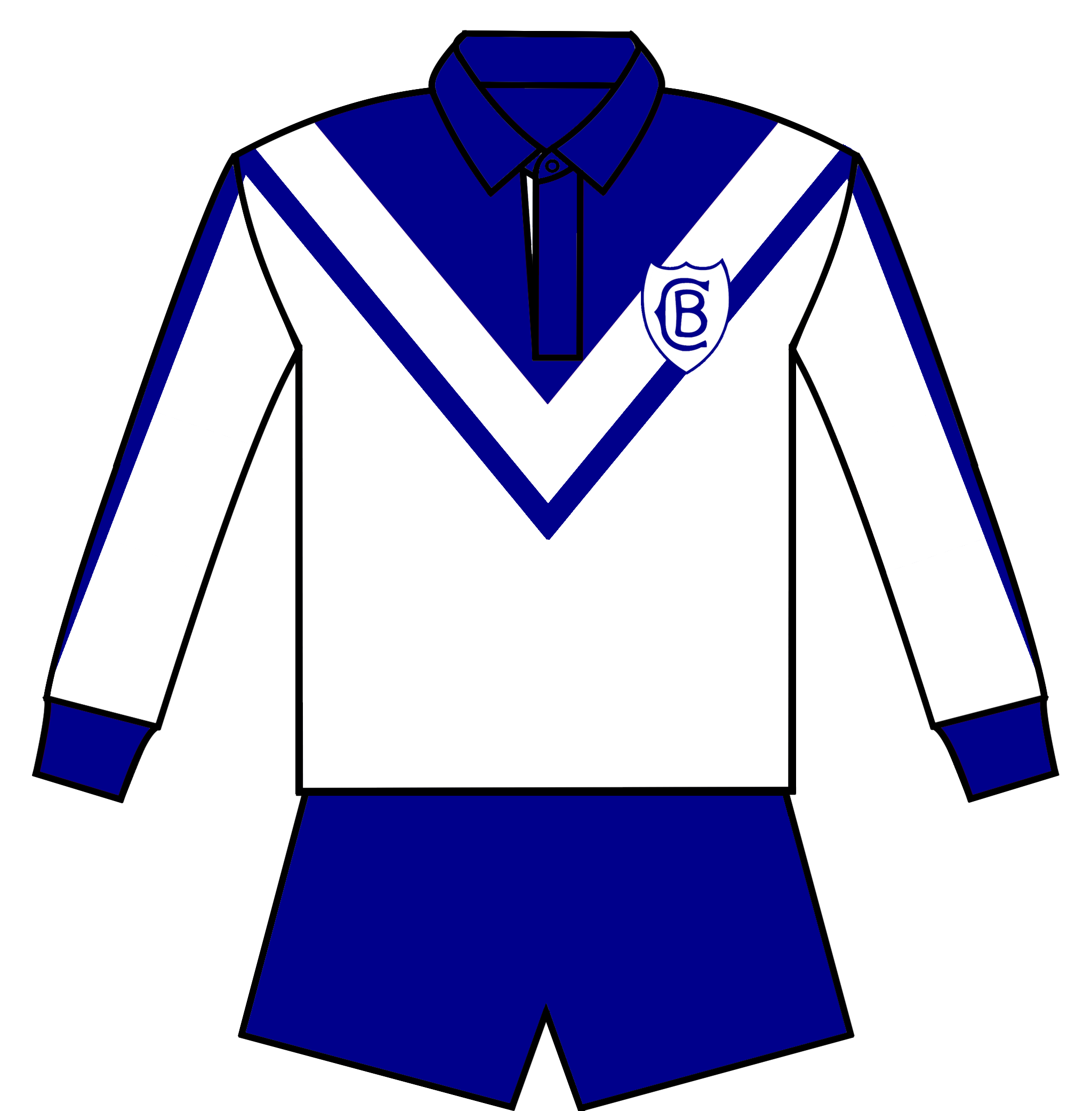
1963–1969, 1973–1977

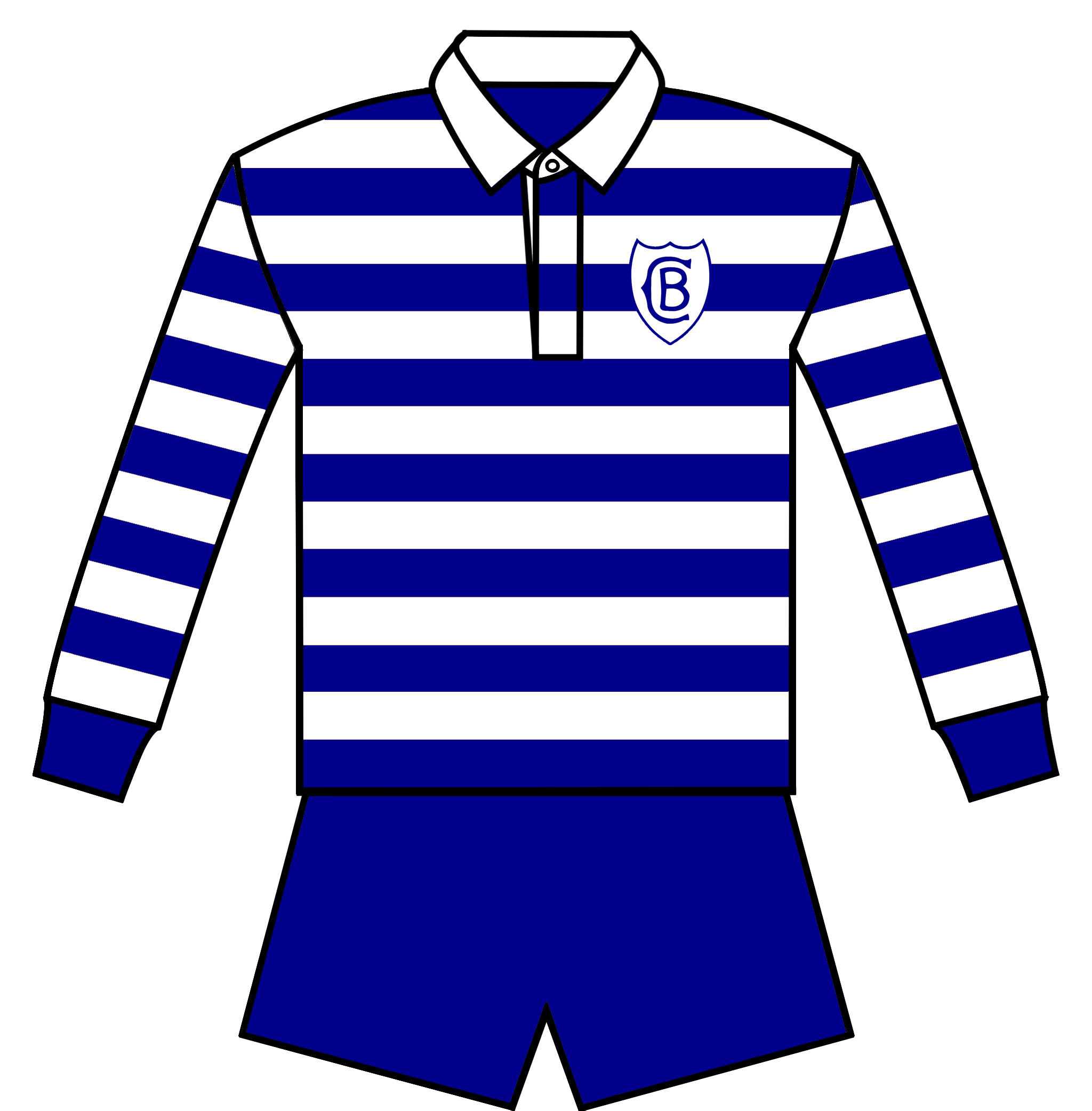
1970–1972

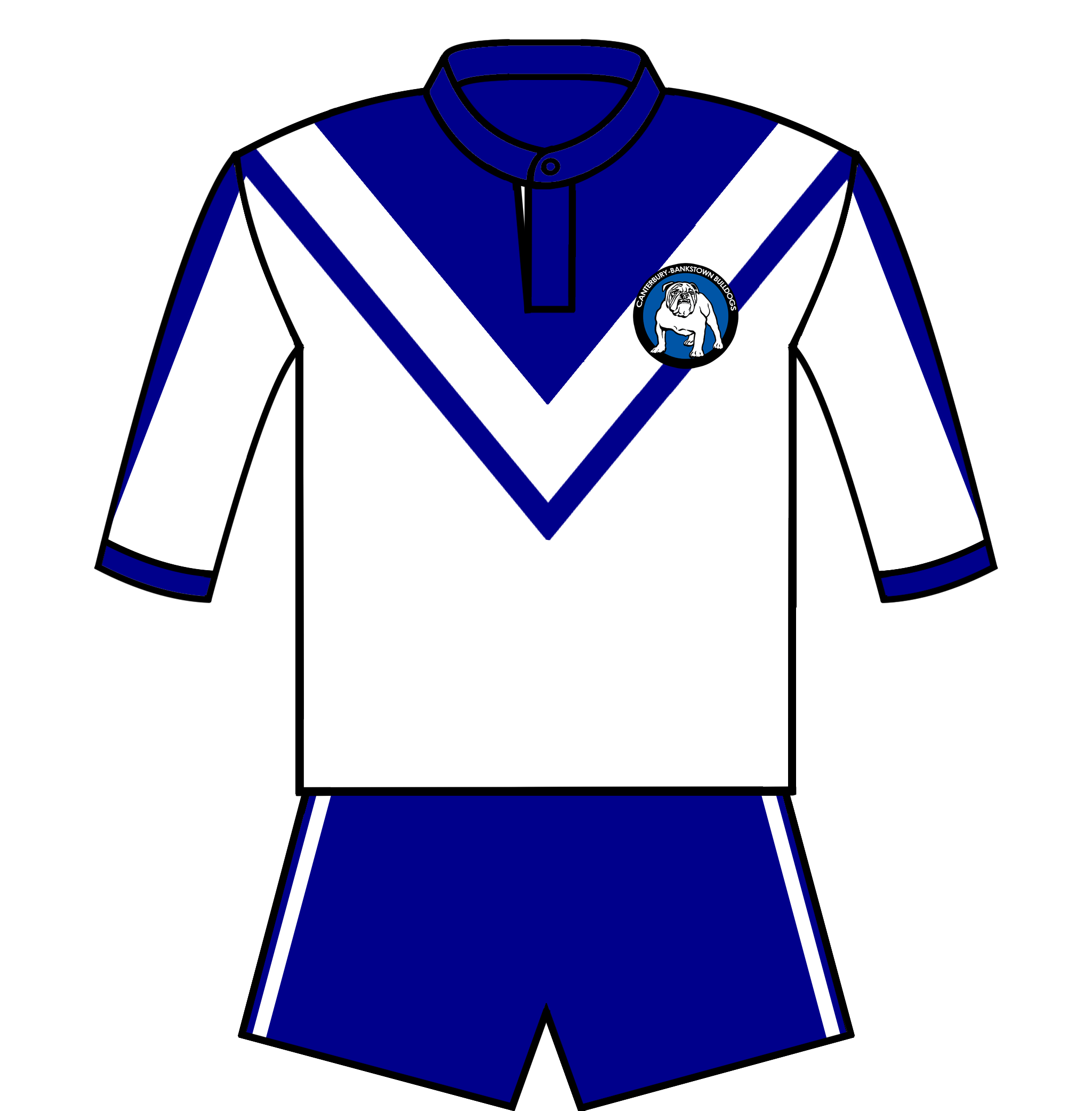
1978–1996

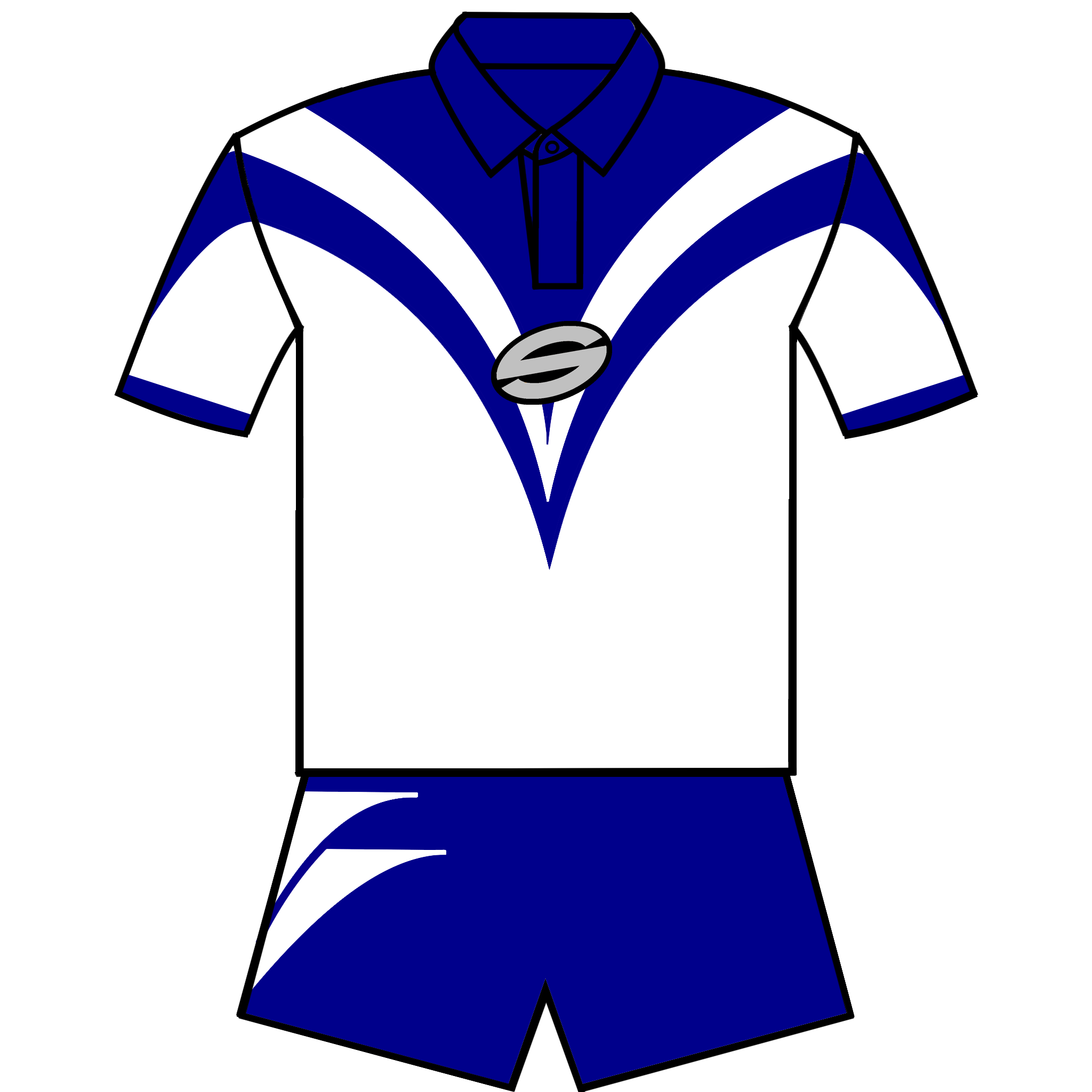
1997

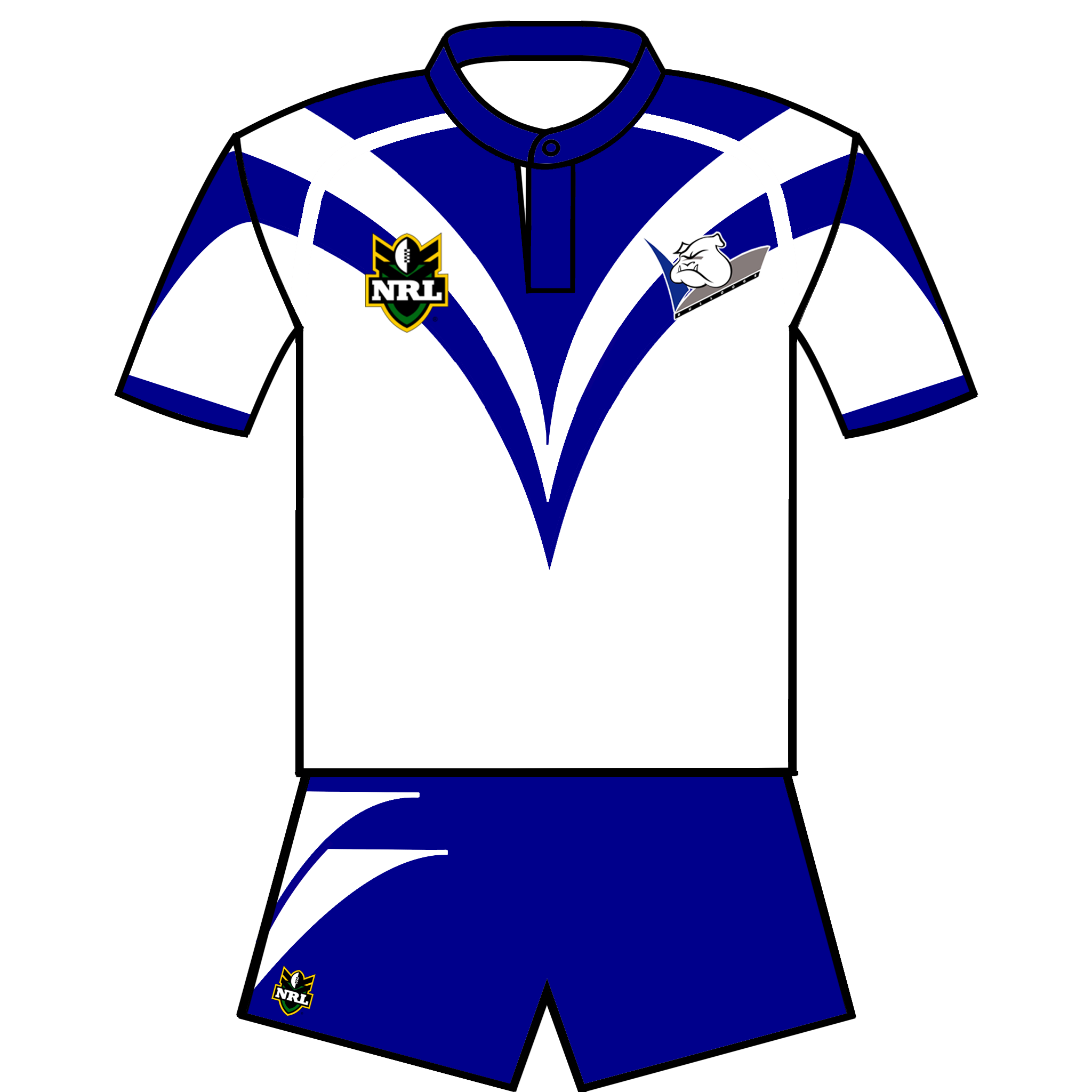
1998-2006

== Stadium ==
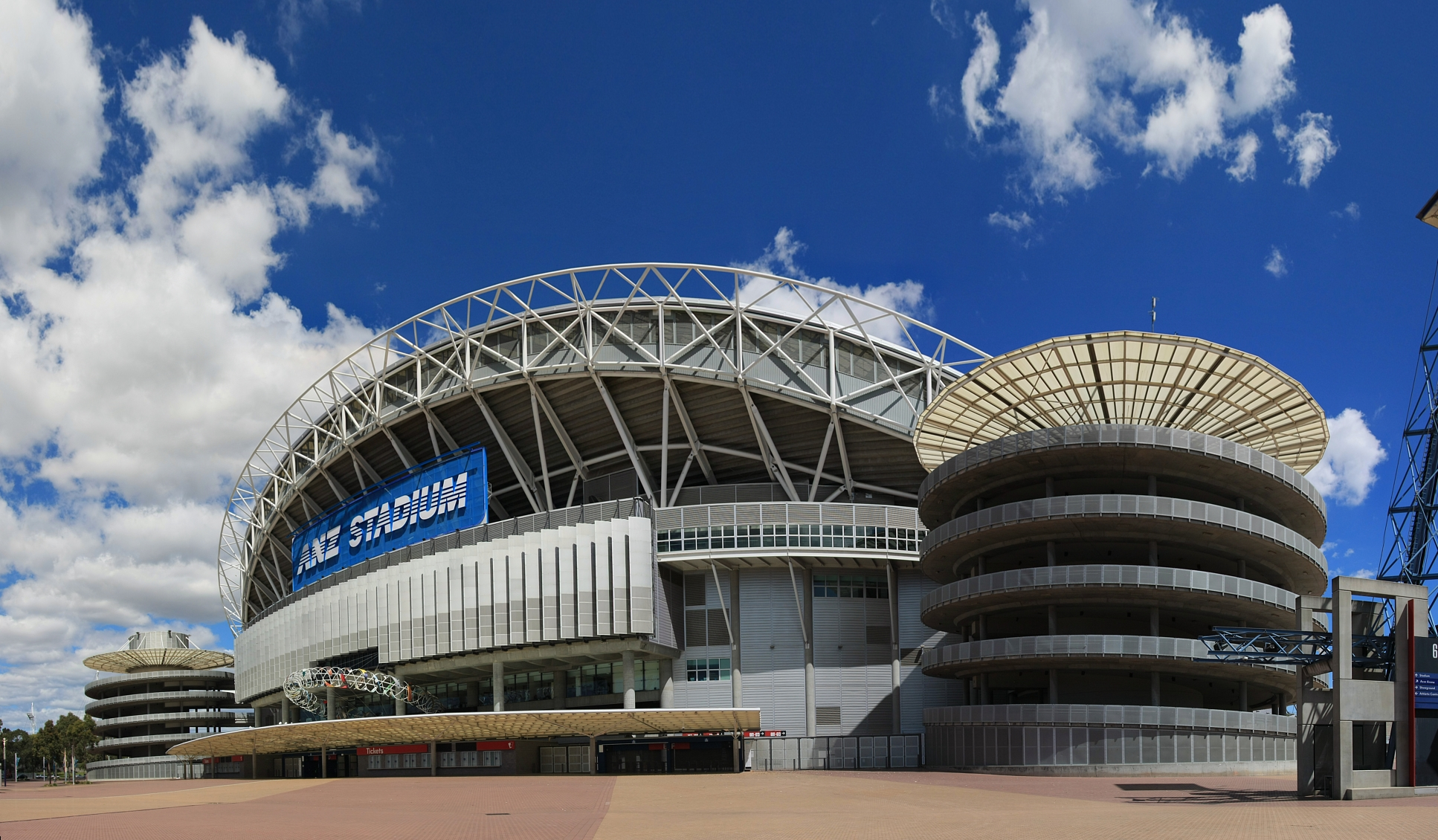
Exterior of Stadium Australia

In their inaugural season, very few home matches were allocated to the Canterbury-Bankstown club. However, when the opportunity arose the club took their matches to either Marrickville or Pratten Park. From the following season, the club began to base itself at Belmore Sports Ground. The club had a long-time affinity with the ground and stayed there continuously until 1994.

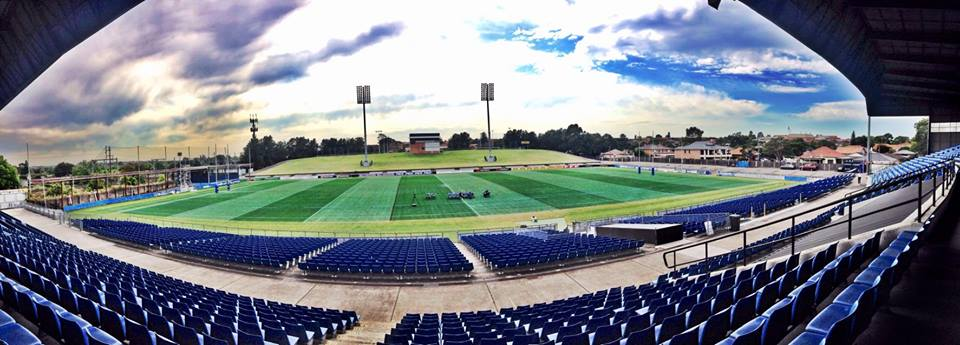
Interior of Belmore Sports Ground

In 1995 when the Super League War began to come about, the club changed its playing name to the "Sydney Bulldogs" in an attempt to broaden its fan base and played matches at Parramatta Stadium where spectator facilities were of a higher class. This move paid off with the club going on to become premiers that season. However, the club reverted its name to Canterbury for the 1996 season and once again played matches out of Belmore Sports Ground; something that lasted up until the inaugural National Rugby League season of 1998.

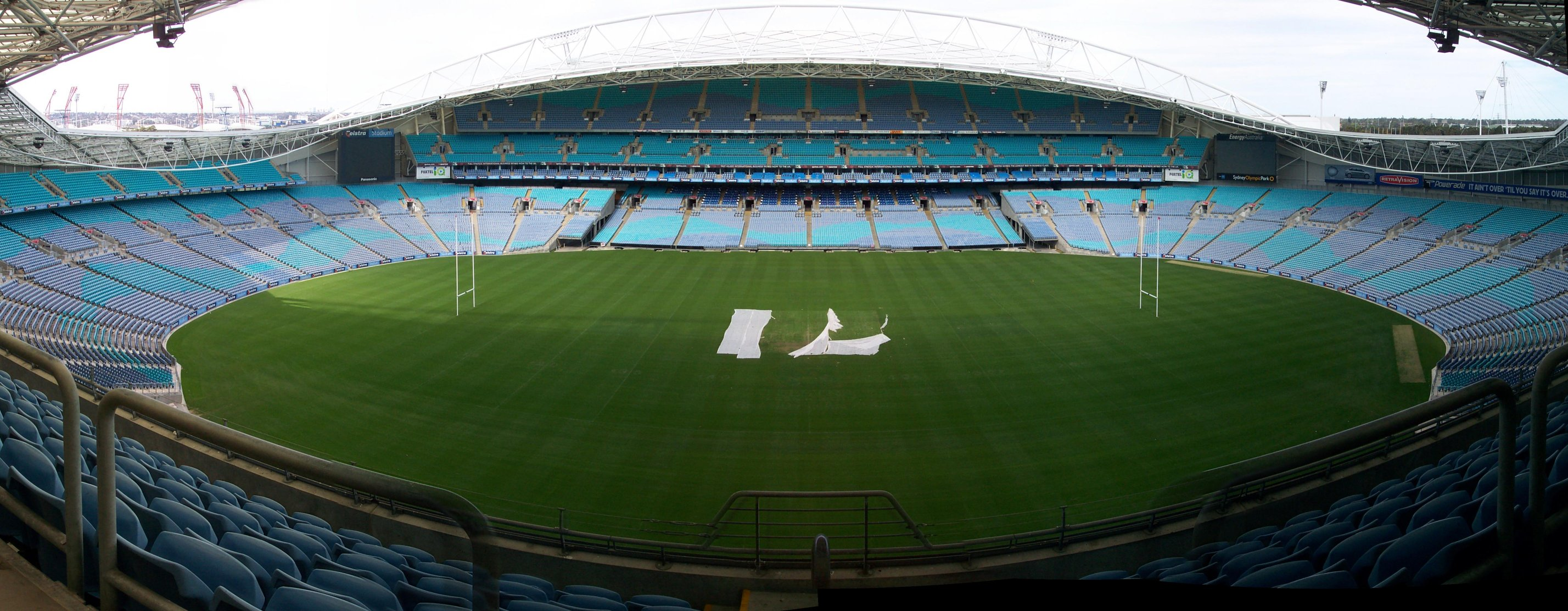
Interior of Stadium Australia

Once the new Stadium Australia had been finished and opened in preparation for the Sydney 2000 Olympic Games, the club began to play matches there between 1999 and 2000. From 2001 to 2005, the club then began to play matches out of the new Sydney Showground at Homebush Bay, with bigger matches played out of Stadium Australia from 2003. When fans began to complain about the poor quality of the Showground venue as a rugby league ground, the club eventually decided to move all future home matches to the Stadium, where the club remains.

The club's training and administration offices remained at Belmore Sports Ground until the beginning of 2008, but were relocated to Sydney Olympic Park during the 2008 season. With the NSW Government committing to upgrading Belmore Sports Ground, the club administration and training has now been returned to the historical ground after a $9 million upgrade.

In 2015, the club played two home games at their traditional home ground Belmore Sports Ground as part of the club's 80th-anniversary celebrations. They have continued to play some games at Belmore every year since 2015. From 2019, the club started to schedule only one home fixture at Belmore Sports Ground. No game was held at Belmore in the 2020 season due to the COVID-19 season postponement and season rescheduling.

== Supporters ==
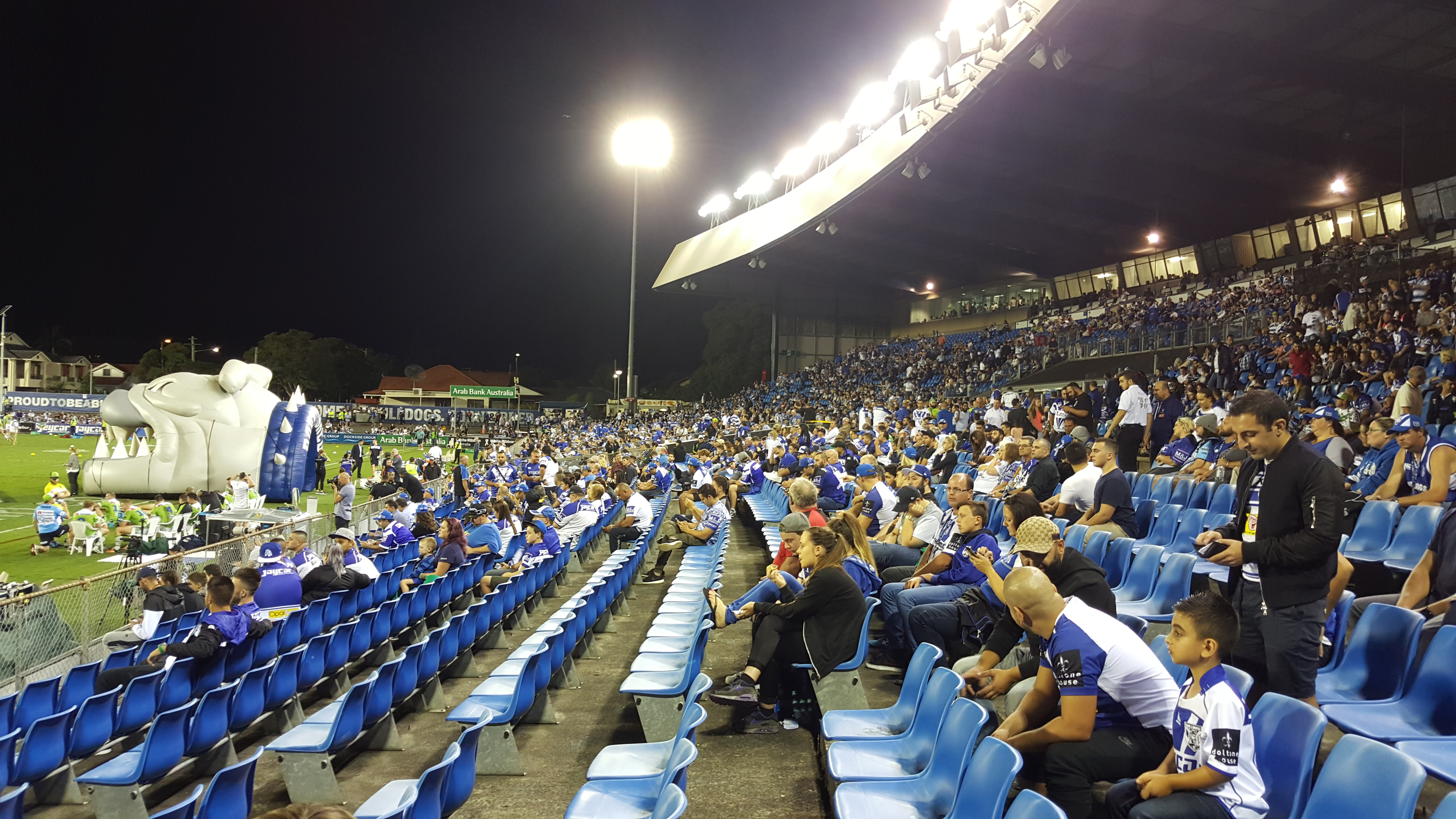
Belmore Oval, Crowd at 2015 "Return to Belmore" match, where the Bulldogs defeated the Melbourne Storm.

The Bulldogs Army is the core supporter group for the Bulldogs, with the section they sit within known as 'The Kennel'. To be sitting in this section, supporters must become a member of the club itself and register any large flags and/or banners which are brought to the game. At all away games the Bulldogs Army locates themselves in the general admission section. The main aim of the Bulldogs Army is to show support and passion for Canterbury.

As the region's traditional local representatives, the Bulldogs predominantly draw on a support base in and around the districts of Canterbury and Bankstown in south-western Sydney, although in recent years club administration and home matches have relocated to Sydney Olympic Park. The Bulldogs are the most supported NRL club in regional NSW—over 25% of Bulldog fans are located in regional NSW, over 25% are located outside of NSW and over 10% are located in Queensland. The club at one stage had one of the highest average attendances in the league: over the 2010 season, it was one of only two clubs to record an average home crowd of more than 20,000. At the end of the 2023 NRL season, the club recorded one of the lowest average home attendances in the league with 16,243. At the end of the 2023 NRL season, the club recorded 22,000 memberships which ranked them higher than the majority of the nine Sydney clubs but significantly lower than South Sydney and Parramatta.

The multicultural demographics of the suburbs in the club's support base, such as Lakemba, means the club has a large number of supporters from a range of non-Anglo ethnicities. In recent years the club has become particularly identified in the media with the Lebanese and the Greek community, particularly with the club's former star goalkicker Hazem El Masri, who migrated from Lebanon as a young child. The Greek community has a huge history of Greeks playing for the club dating back to the 1970s with club legend Dr George Peponis, who migrated from Greece as a very young child who captained the Bulldogs and Australia. El Masri retired at the end of the 2009 season.

=== Notable supporters ===
Famous Bulldogs Supporters
Matthew Barton, Tennis Player; Tahir Bilgic, Actor, Comedian, Writer and Creator; Don Burke, Television Personality and Writer; Tony Burke, Politician, 21st Leader of the House; John Fahey, 38th Premier of New South Wales; Elka Graham, Olympic Swimmer; Joe Hansen, Guitarist for Grinspoon; John Hatzistergos, Politician; Tsehay Hawkins, the Yellow Wiggle of The Wiggles; Paul Keating, 24th Prime Minister of Australia; Harry Kewell, Soccer Player; Chris Minns, 47th Premier of New South Wales	Michael Clarke, Cricketer; Peter Lonard, Golfer; James Magnussen, Olympic Swimmer; Ma'a Nonu, Rugby Union Player; Chris Paterson, Hair Stylist; Margot Robbie, Australian actress; Tony Roche, Tennis Player; Ian Thorpe, Olympic Swimmer; Doug Walters, Cricketer; Mark Waugh, Cricketer; Steve Waugh, Cricketer; Bill Woods, Journalist

== Rivalries ==
=== Parramatta Eels ===
The rivalry between the Canterbury-Bankstown Bulldogs and the Parramatta Eels is one of the fiercest in the NRL. The two clubs have been geographically close throughout their whole histories. In the 1980s, Canterbury and Parramatta both won four premierships each and met in two grand finals in 1984 and 1986.

In the 1990s, at the height of the super league war, Parramatta signed four of Canterbury's star players Jarrod McCracken, Dean Pay, Jim Dymock and Jason Smith which helped Parramatta reach the finals for the first time in eleven years, in the 1998 preliminary final, Parramatta were winning against Canterbury 18–2 with less than ten minutes to play when Canterbury staged one of the biggest finals comebacks defeating Parramatta 32–20 in extra time.

In the 2007 NRL season, the club's played each other in the elimination final at Telstra Stadium with Parramatta gaining revenge for the 1998 preliminary final as they defeated Canterbury 25–6.

In the 2009 NRL season, Parramatta defeated Canterbury in the preliminary final to cap off a remarkable run to the grand final. The crowd which attended the match was a non grand final record of 74,000 fans.

Speaking to the Herald Sun in 2007, former Canterbury-Bankstown player Craig Polla-Mounter described the rivalry between the two club's saying "I think the Parramatta and Canterbury fans can be the most unforgiving, especially when we play each other. I have no doubt it is the biggest rivalry in rugby league and part of the reason he didn't play again". Polla-Mounter said this in reference to Parramatta player Paul Carige and his infamous performance in the 1998 preliminary final.

Speaking of the rivalry in 2015, former Canterbury player James Graham said "As soon as I came to this club, I was told that they were the closest club to us and that there was no love lost between players and fans". Andrew Ryan who played for both clubs said "Both clubs do speak about the rivalry, in the change room and leading into the clashes, they always want to get the wood on their rival, I went for Canterbury when I was a kid, but then got my first opportunity in first grade to play for Parramatta. They place a huge amount of emphasis on the game. I think I was one of the only players to go the other way, a lot of players who had played for the Bulldogs allayed first the Eels, not too many went the other way".

=== Sydney Roosters ===
The Canterbury-Bankstown Bulldogs have a long-standing rivalry with fellow team the Sydney Roosters, Whilst both teams had crossed premiership paths in grand finals in four occasions. In 1938, Canterbury-Bankstown won their first premiership against the Eastern Suburbs as what they were known as back then winning 19–6 at the Sydney Cricket Ground. Two years later in 1940, the sides met again with the Easts winning the 1940 NSWRFL Grand Final 24–14. In 1980, the Canterbury-Bankstown Bulldogs broke a 38-year premiership drought defeating the Eastern Suburbs Roosters 18–4 at the Sydney Cricket Ground.

In 2002, the Sydney Roosters won the NRL premiership on the back of a 9-game winning streak. This was the same year the premiership favourite Canterbury were stripped of 37 points due to systematic breaches of the salary cap in 2001 and 2002, in 2003, the Roosters proved themselves worthy of defending premiers title when they defeated Canterbury in the preliminary final 28–18 in front of a sold out Sydney Football Stadium. In 2004, the Roosters defeated Canterbury 35–0 and fighting broke out in the stands during and after the game had been completed. While the Roosters finished the regular season with the minor premiership, Canterbury defeated them in the grand final 16–13 after trailing 13–6 at half time.

As of the 2024 NRL season, the last time the two clubs met in a finals game was the 2015 Elimination Final which the Roosters won 38–12 at the Sydney Football Stadium.

=== St. George Illawarra Dragons ===
The Canterbury-Bankstown Bulldogs have a fierce rivalry with their neighbour the St. George Illawarra Dragons. Canterbury-Bankstown were founded in 1935, fourteen years after St. George Dragons, St. George inflicted a premiership record 91–6 victory over Canterbury in 1935 but Canterbury enjoyed premiership success first in 1938 and St. George in 1942. In the 1942 NSWRFL season, the two clubs met in the Grand Final with Canterbury-Bankstown defeating St. George 11–9 in a low-scoring affair at the Sydney Cricket Ground. After that however, St. George recorded eleven straight premierships in the years following 1955–1966. It was also Canterbury who put an end to their Premiership run in 1967, when they beat them by a point in the preliminary final to face South Sydney in the grand final. Since then, both clubs inflicted Premiership defeats on the other, with the St. George Dragons defeating the Canterbury-Bankstown Bulldogs in their last grand final success in 1979, the Bulldogs returned the favour in 1985.

The two teams subsequently met in the 1993 preliminary final which St. George defeated Canterbury 27–12. They would meet again in the 1995 and 1998 finals series with Canterbury running out winners on both occasions. The elimination final in 1998 was also St. George's last game as a stand-alone entity as the club elected to form a joint venture with Illawarra for the 1999 NRL season. Biggest loss 6–91 (85 pts) – 11 May 1935 – vs. St George.

In recent years, the Bulldogs have enjoyed a period of success over the Red V. In the 2023 NRL season, Canterbury won the only fixture 18-16 at Wollongong Showground, with Bulldogs junior Jake Averillo scoring a double to seal the victory in Round 9. The sides met twice in the 2024 NRL season, first in Round 12 as the Bulldogs scored 38 unanswered second half points to win 44-12. The Round 23 return fixture at Jubilee Oval was won convincingly by Canterbury, 28-10. The two sides kicked off their 2025 NRL season against each other at this same venue, as the Bulldogs won 28-20 despite a hat-trick from Christian Tuipulotu. The Dogs survived to win 20-18 in Round 20, with new recruit Lachlan Galvin setting up a dramatic 78th minute winner in his first match as Canterbury's halfback, extending Canterbury's win streak over the Dragons to 5 matches.

The two rivals are set to meet again in Round 1 to open the 2026 season as part of Rugby League Las Vegas. The game is scheduled for Saturday, 28 February 2026, local time.

=== South Sydney Rabbitohs ===
Souths and Canterbury-Bankstown have played each other every Good Friday since 2012. They met in the 1967 NSWRFL Grand Final with South Sydney winning 12–10. However, the competitive nature intensified when they met in the 2014 NRL Grand Final where Souths won 30–6 to claim their first premiership since 1971.

During their Good Friday clash in 2015, this game was labelled "Bad Friday" for its controversy, as South Sydney won 18–17 thanks to a late penalty goal. Canterbury fans were angry about the match officials decision and attacked the match officials when they walked off the field, throwing bottles at them, even causing one of them to slip over. Some fans were given lifetime bans for throwing bottles at the match officials.

In round 4 of the 2021 NRL season, Canterbury were defeated 38–0 by South Sydney in the traditional Good Friday game. Canterbury became only the second team in the NRL era to lose three straight games without scoring a point after Cronulla who achieved this in the 2014 NRL season. It was also the worst start to a season by any team since Glebe in the 1928 NSWRFL season who managed to only score 12 points in their first four matches. In round 6 of the 2023 NRL season, South Sydney recorded the most points scored by a winning team in the Good Friday game as they defeated Canterbury 50–16.

In the 2025 NRL season, Canterbury recorded a clean-sweep over Souths, winning the two matches between the clubs. In Round 7, Canterbury won 32-0 in the Good Friday clash which was played in front of 65,305 spectators, setting the record for the largest crowd for a standalone regular season fixture. With this win, the Bulldogs equalled their best ever start to a season, seeing 6 consecutive wins without loss. The two sides met again in Round 15, with Canterbury leading 18-0 after 17 minutes, before a dramatic storm disrupted the game for 30-minutes just before half-time. The Bulldogs held on to win 24-18.

== Canterbury League Club ==
The Canterbury League Club is the licensed club of the Canterbury-Bankstown Bulldogs. Canterbury League Club first opened its doors for trade in September 1956 to service the needs of the football club and local community. The Salvation Army Hall became the first venue of the Canterbury League Club. Sixty people would fill the venue on a busy night.

In the first two years of trade the club was outgrowing itself and in 1960 the Club moved its premises to Bridge St which allowed the League Club to grow as well as cater for patron parking.

In 2000, the Board had approved major renovations. The renovations started in 2000 and in 2002 the Brasserie, Restaurant, new foyer, level 1 and health club were opened to the public.

The club also amalgamated with Lakemba Services Memorial Club (2008) & Belfield RSL (2013).

Canterbury League Club has amenities including three restaurants, two coffee shops, multiple bars and entertainment lounges and a 24-hour health club.

== Statistics and records ==
Hazem El Masri holds the NRL record for the most games played for the club, having made 317 appearances in total.

Hazem El Masri also holds records for the most points scored, the most tries scored and the most points scored for the Bulldogs. Since his debut in 1996, he has scored a total of 2,418 points—which was also a competition record for Rugby League in Australia until 2019. Former player Daryl Halligan, who retired with the club in 2000, had previously held the competition record for most points scored with 2,034, which included points scored whilst at his former club the North Sydney Bears.

The club's largest win occurred in 1995 when they played as the "Sydney Bulldogs." In a match against the newly formed North Queensland Cowboys, the Bulldogs won 66–4. In the club's first season in 1935 they were subject to the two heaviest defeats in competition history two weeks in succession. Firstly, they lost to St. George 91–6 and the following week to Eastern Suburbs 87–7. However, despite these big losses, the club was able to secure their first premiership three years later in 1938 in the Grand Final against Eastern Suburbs; at the same time setting the record for becoming the quickest non-foundation club to win a title. This record was not broken until 1999.

In 2002, the club won 17 matches in a row after getting beaten by the New Zealand Warriors; falling just two short of the record set by the Eastern Suburbs team of 1975.

In round 7 of the 2014 season, after beating the South Sydney Rabbitohs 15–14, Canterbury became the first club to win three consecutive matches by one point. They went on to be runners up to South Sydney in the grand final.

Canterbury are the only team in NSWRL/NRL history to win a premiership and then finish with back to back wooden spoon's. In 1942, Canterbury won their second premiership defeating St. George in the grand final but then finished last in 1943 and 1944. Canterbury also endured one of the longest premiership droughts in the competitions history with the club not winning a title between 1942 and 1980 which totalled 38 years.

== Season summaries ==
P=Premiers, R=Runner-Ups, M=Minor Premierships, F=Finals Appearance, W=Wooden Spoons (brackets represent finals games)
Competition	Games Played	Games Won	Games Drawn	Games Lost	Ladder Position	P	R	M	F	W	Coach	Captain	Details
1935 NSWRFL season	16	2	0	14	8 / 9						Tedda Courtney	Jack Morrison / Tom Carey	Canterbury-Bankstown 1935
1936 NSWRFL season	14 (1)	9	2	3 (1)	3 / 9				✔		Frank Burge	Alan Brady	Canterbury-Bankstown 1936
1937 NSWRFL season	8	4	0	4	5 / 9						George Mason	Alan Brady	Canterbury-Bankstown 1937
1938 NSWRFL season	14 (2)	12 (2)	2	1	1 / 8	✔		✔	✔		Jimmy Craig	Alan Brady	Canterbury-Bankstown 1938
1939 NSWRFL season	14 (1)	10	0	4	3 / 8				✔		Jerry Brien	Alan Brady	Canterbury-Bankstown 1939
1940 NSWRFL season	14 (2)	8 (1)	0	6 (1)	4 / 8		✔		✔		Alan Brady	Alan Brady / Jack Bonnyman	Canterbury-Bankstown 1940
1941 NSWRFL season	14 (1)	9	0	5 (1)	3 / 8				✔		Ron Bailey	Ron Bailey	Canterbury-Bankstown 1941
1942 NSWRFL season	14 (2)	10 (1)	0	4 (1)	1 / 8	✔		✔	✔		Jerry Brien	Ron Bailey	Canterbury-Bankstown 1942
1943 NSWRFL season	14	3	0	11	8 / 8					✔	Roy Kirkaldy	Roy Kirkaldy	Canterbury-Bankstown 1943
1944 NSWRFL season	14	3	1	10	8 / 8					✔	Ron Bailey/ Cec Fifield	Ron Bailey	Canterbury-Bankstown 1944
1945 NSWRFL season	14	4	1	9	6 / 8						Bill Kelly	George Kilham	Canterbury-Bankstown 1945
1946 NSWRFL season	14 (2)	8 (1)	1	5 (1)	4 / 8				✔		Ross McKinnon	Ron Bailey	Canterbury-Bankstown 1946
1947 NSWRFL season	18 (3)	13 (1)	1	4 (2)	1 / 10		✔	✔	✔		Ross McKinnon	Henry Porter	Canterbury-Bankstown 1947
1948 NSWRFL season	18	7	2	9	5 / 10						Arthur Halloway	Henry Porter	Canterbury-Bankstown 1948
1949 NSWRFL season	18	6	2	10	7 / 10						Henry Porter	Bruce Hopkins	Canterbury-Bankstown 1949
1950 NSWRFL season	18	9	0	9	6 / 10						Alby Why	Eddie Burns	Canterbury-Bankstown 1950
1951 NSWRFL season	18	7	0	11	7 / 10						Vic Bulgin / Alby Why	Vic Bulgin	Canterbury-Bankstown 1951
1952 NSWRFL season	18	5	1	12	9 / 10						Alby Why	Ken Charlton	Canterbury-Bankstown 1952
1953 NSWRFL season	18	9	2	7	6 / 10						Jack Hampstead	Cec Cooper	Canterbury-Bankstown 1953
1954 NSWRFL season	18	4	0	14	8 / 10						Jack Hampstead	Leo Trevena	Canterbury-Bankstown 1954
1955 NSWRFL season	18	4	0	14	9 / 10						Vic Hey	Ray Gartner	Canterbury-Bankstown 1955
1956 NSWRFL season	18	6	0	12	7 / 10						Vic Hey	Col Geelan	Canterbury-Bankstown 1956
1957 NSWRFL season	18	3	1	14	9 / 10						Col Geelan	Col Geelan	Canterbury-Bankstown 1957
1958 NSWRFL season	18	4	1	13	9 / 10						Cec Cooper	Ray Gartner	Canterbury-Bankstown 1958
1959 NSWRFL season	18	5	1	12	9 / 10						Cec Cooper	Brian Davies	Canterbury-Bankstown 1959
1960 NSWRFL season	18 (2)	11 (0)	0	7 (2)	5 / 10				✔		Eddie Burns	Brian Davies	Canterbury-Bankstown 1960
1961 NSWRFL season	18	6	1	11	8 / 10						Eddie Burns	Ray Gartner	Canterbury-Bankstown 1961
1962 NSWRFL season	18	7	2	9	6 / 10						Eddie Burns	Ray Beavan / Brian Davies	Canterbury-Bankstown 1962
1963 NSWRFL season	18	6	1	11	8 / 10						Clive Churchill	Ray Gartner	Canterbury-Bankstown 1963
1964 NSWRFL season	18	1	1	16	10 / 10					✔	Clive Churchill	Les Johns	Canterbury-Bankstown 1964
1965 NSWRFL season	18	5	0	13	9 / 10						Eddie Burns	Leo Toohey	Canterbury-Bankstown 1965
1966 NSWRFL season	18	8	0	10	8 / 10						Roger Pearman	Roger Pearman / George Taylforth	Canterbury-Bankstown 1966
1967 NSWRFL season	22 (3)	14 (2)	1	7 (1)	3 / 12		✔		✔		Kevin Ryan	Kevin Ryan	Canterbury-Bankstown 1967
1968 NSWRFL season	22	9	1	12	9 / 12						Kevin Ryan	Kevin Ryan	Canterbury-Bankstown 1968
1969 NSWRFL season	22	10	0	12	8 / 12						Kevin Ryan	Kevin Ryan	Canterbury-Bankstown 1969
1970 NSWRFL season	22 (1)	14 (0)	0	8 (1)	4 / 12				✔		Kevin Ryan	Ron Raper	Canterbury-Bankstown 1970
1971 NSWRFL season	22	11	0	11	6 / 12						Bob Hagan	Johnny Greaves	Canterbury-Bankstown 1971
1972 NSWRFL season	22	12	0	10	6 / 12						Bob Hagan	Johnny Greaves	Canterbury-Bankstown 1972
1973 NSWRFL season	22 (1)	12 (0)	1	10 (1)	5 / 12				✔		Malcolm Clift	Geoff Connell	Canterbury-Bankstown 1973
1974 NSWRFL season	22 (3)	13 (2)	0	9 (1)	3 / 12		✔		✔		Malcolm Clift	John McDonell	Canterbury-Bankstown Bulldogs 1974
1975 NSWRFL season	22 (1)	11 (0)	0	9 (1)	4 / 12				✔		Malcolm Clift	Tim Pickup	Canterbury-Bankstown Bulldogs 1975
1976 NSWRFL season	22 (3)	12 (2)	3	7 (1)	5 / 12				✔		Malcolm Clift	Bob McCarthy	Canterbury-Bankstown Bulldogs 1976
1977 NSWRFL season	22	10	1	11	7 / 12						Malcolm Clift	Bob McCarthy	Canterbury-Bankstown Bulldogs 1977
1978 NSWRFL season	22 (1)	13 (0)	2	7 (1)	5 / 12				✔		Ted Glossop	George Peponis	Canterbury-Bankstown Bulldogs 1978
1979 NSWRFL season	22 (4)	13 (3)	0	9 (1)	5 / 12		✔		✔		Ted Glossop	George Peponis	Canterbury-Bankstown Bulldogs 1979
1980 NSWRFL season	22 (3)	15 (3)	0	7 (0)	2 / 12	✔			✔		Ted Glossop	George Peponis	Canterbury-Bankstown Bulldogs 1980
1981 NSWRFL season	22	8	0	14	10 / 12						Ted Glossop	George Peponis	Canterbury-Bankstown Bulldogs 1981
1982 NSWRFL season	26	12	3	11	9 / 14						Ted Glossop	George Peponis	Canterbury-Bankstown Bulldogs 1982
1983 NSWRFL season	26 (3)	18 (1)	0	8 (2)	3 / 14				✔		Ted Glossop	Chris Anderson	Canterbury-Bankstown Bulldogs 1983
1984 NSWRL season	24 (2)	19 (2)	0	5 (0)	1 / 13	✔		✔	✔		Warren Ryan	Steve Mortimer	Canterbury-Bankstown Bulldogs 1984
1985 NSWRL season	24 (4)	16 (3)	2	6 (1)	3 / 13	✔			✔		Warren Ryan	Steve Mortimer	Canterbury-Bankstown Bulldogs 1985
1986 NSWRL season	24 (4)	15 (2)	1	8 (2)	3 / 13		✔		✔		Warren Ryan	Steve Mortimer	Canterbury-Bankstown Bulldogs 1986
1987 NSWRL season	24	13	0	11	6 / 13						Warren Ryan	Steve Mortimer	Canterbury-Bankstown Bulldogs 1987
1988 NSWRL season	22 (3)	16 (3)	0	6 (0)	2 / 16	✔			✔		Phil Gould	Peter Tunks	Canterbury-Bankstown Bulldogs 1988
1989 NSWRL season	22	10	2	10	9 / 16						Phil Gould	Peter Tunks	Canterbury-Bankstown Bulldogs 1989
1990 NSWRL season	22	12	1	9	7 / 16						Chris Anderson	Terry Lamb	Canterbury-Bankstown Bulldogs 1990
1991 NSWRL season	22 (1)	13 (0)	1	8 (1)	5 / 16				✔		Chris Anderson	Terry Lamb	Canterbury-Bankstown Bulldogs 1991
1992 NSWRL season	22	10	2	10	7 / 16						Chris Anderson	Terry Lamb	Canterbury-Bankstown Bulldogs 1992
1993 NSWRL season	22 (2)	17 (0)	0	5 (2)	1 / 16			✔	✔		Chris Anderson	Terry Lamb	Canterbury-Bankstown Bulldogs 1993
1994 NSWRL season	22 (2)	18 (1)	0	4 (1)	1 / 16		✔	✔	✔		Chris Anderson	Terry Lamb	Canterbury-Bankstown Bulldogs 1994
1995 ARL season	22 (4)	14 (4)	0	8 (0)	6 / 20	✔			✔		Chris Anderson	Terry Lamb	Sydney Bulldogs 1995
1996 ARL season	21	11	0	10	10 / 20						Chris Anderson	Simon Gillies	Sydney Bulldogs 1996
1997 SL season	18 (1)	10 (0)	0	8 (1)	4 / 10				✔		Chris Anderson	Simon Gillies	Canterbury Bulldogs 1997
1998 NRL season	24 (5)	13 (4)	0	11 (1)	9 / 20		✔		✔		Steve Folkes	Darren Britt	Canterbury Bulldogs 1998
1999 NRL season	24 (2)	15 (1)	1	8 (1)	5 / 17				✔		Steve Folkes	Darren Britt	Canterbury Bulldogs 1999
2000 NRL season	26	10	1	15	11 / 14						Steve Folkes	Darren Britt	Bulldogs 2000
2001 NRL season	26 (2)	17 (0)	3	6 (2)	2 / 14				✔		Steve Folkes	Darren Britt	Bulldogs 2001
2002 NRL season	24	20	1	3	15 / 15					✔	Steve Folkes	Steven Price	Bulldogs 2002
2003 NRL season	24	16 (1)	0	8 (2)	3 / 15				✔		Steve Folkes	Steven Price	Bulldogs 2003
2004 NRL season	24 (4)	19 (3)	0	5 (1)	2 / 15	✔			✔		Steve Folkes	Steven Price	Bulldogs 2004
2005 NRL season	24	9	1	14	12 / 15						Steve Folkes	Andrew Ryan	Bulldogs 2005
2006 NRL season	24 (2)	16 (1)	0	8 (1)	2 / 15				✔		Steve Folkes	Andrew Ryan	Bulldogs 2006
2007 NRL season	24 (2)	12 (0)	0	12 (2)	6 / 16				✔		Steve Folkes	Andrew Ryan	Bulldogs 2007
2008 NRL season	24	5	0	19	16 / 16					✔	Steve Folkes	Andrew Ryan	Bulldogs 2008
2009 NRL season	24 (2)	18 (1)	0	6 (1)	2 / 16				✔		Kevin Moore	Andrew Ryan	Bulldogs 2009
2010 NRL season	24	9	0	15	13 / 16						Kevin Moore	Andrew Ryan	Canterbury-Bankstown Bulldogs 2010
2011 NRL season	24	12	0	12	9 / 16						Kevin Moore/ Jim Dymock	Andrew Ryan	Canterbury-Bankstown Bulldogs 2011
2012 NRL season	24 (3)	18 (2)	0	6 (1)	1 / 16		✔	✔	✔		Des Hasler	Michael Ennis	Canterbury-Bankstown Bulldogs 2012
2013 NRL season	24 (1)	13 (0)	0	11 (1)	6 / 16				✔		Des Hasler	Michael Ennis	Canterbury-Bankstown Bulldogs 2013
2014 NRL season	24 (4)	13 (3)	0	11 (1)	7 / 16		✔		✔		Des Hasler	Michael Ennis and Frank Pritchard (Co-captains)	Canterbury-Bankstown Bulldogs 2014
2015 NRL season	24 (2)	14 (1)	0	10 (1)	5 / 16				✔		Des Hasler	James Graham	Canterbury-Bankstown Bulldogs 2015
2016 NRL season	24 (1)	14 (0)	0	10 (1)	7 / 16				✔		Des Hasler	James Graham	Canterbury-Bankstown Bulldogs 2016
2017 NRL season	24	10	0	14	11 / 16						Des Hasler	James Graham	Canterbury-Bankstown Bulldogs 2017
2018 NRL season	24	8	0	16	12 / 16						Dean Pay	Josh Jackson	Canterbury-Bankstown Bulldogs 2018
2019 NRL season	24	10	0	14	12 / 16						Dean Pay	Josh Jackson	Canterbury-Bankstown Bulldogs 2019
2020 NRL season	20	3	0	17	15 / 16						Dean Pay / Steve Georgallis	Josh Jackson	Canterbury-Bankstown Bulldogs 2020
2021 NRL season	24	3	0	21	16 / 16					✔	Trent Barrett	Josh Jackson	Canterbury-Bankstown Bulldogs 2021
2022 NRL season	24	7	0	17	12 / 16						Trent Barrett / Michael Potter	Josh Jackson	Canterbury-Bankstown Bulldogs 2022
2023 NRL season	24	7	0	17	15 / 17						Cameron Ciraldo	Raymond Faitala-Mariner (Club Captain); Matt Burton and Reed Mahoney (Game day Co-captains)	Canterbury-Bankstown Bulldogs 2023
2024 NRL season	24 (1)	14 (0)	0	10 (1)	6 / 17				✔		Cameron Ciraldo	Stephen Crichton	Canterbury-Bankstown Bulldogs 2024
2025 NRL season	24 (2)	16 (0)	0	8 (2)	3 / 17				✔		Cameron Ciraldo	Stephen Crichton	Canterbury-Bankstown Bulldogs 2025
2026 NRL season	12	4	0	8	TBD/17						Cameron Ciraldo	Stephen Crichton	Canterbury-Bankstown Bulldogs 2026

== Sponsorship history ==
Year	Kit Manufacturer	Major Sponsor	Back Top Sponsor	Sleeve Sponsor	Back Bottom Sponsor	Front Shorts Sponsor	Back Shorts Sponsor	Chest Sponsor
1978-79	Classic Sportswear	-	-	-	-	-	-	-
1980-81	Classic Sportswear	Electronic Sales & Rentals	General Corporation Japan	-	-	-	-	-
1982	Classic Sportswear	Joyce Mayne	General Corporation Japan	-	-	-	-	-
1983	Classic Sportswear	General Corporation Japan	General Corporation Japan	-	-	-	-	-
1984-89	Classic Sportswear	HFC Finance	HFC Finance	-	-	-	-	-
1990	Classic Sportswear	Household Finance	Household Card	-	-	-	-	-
1991	Classic Sportswear	Household Finance	Household Card	Mobil	-	-	-	-
1992	Classic Sportswear	Household Finance	Household Card	-	-	-	-	-
1993	Classic Sportswear	Hyundai	Hyundai	Cenovis Vitamins	-	-	-	-
1994-96	Classic Sportswear	Hyundai	Hyundai	Cenovis Vitamins	-	Hyundai	-	-
1997	Nike	Canterbury Leagues Club	-	Cenovis Vitamins	-	-	-	-
1998	Nike	Stardome	Stardome	Cenovis Vitamins	-	-	-	-
1999	Nike	Stardome	Stardome	Cenovis Vitamins	-	Clipsal	-	-
2000	Nike	RealEstate.com.au	RealEstate.com.au	Cenovis Vitamins	-	Clipsal	-	-
2001	Nike	NTG	National Telecoms Group	ADCO Constructions	-	Clipsal	-	-
2002	Nike	National Telecoms	NTG	ADCO Constructions	-	Bradley	Clipsal	-
2003	Nike	Mitsubishi Electric	Diamond View	ADCO Constructions	-	Bradley	Progressive Investment Securities	-
2004	Nike	Mitsubishi Electric	Diamond Digital	Auto Group Auctions	-	AGC Catering Equipment	Kari & Ghossayn	-
2005	Nike	Mitsubishi Electric	Diamond Digital	Auto Group Auctions	-	Yes Home Loans	Bill Express	-
2006	Nike	Mitsubishi Electric	Yes Home Loans	QLD Group	Yes Home Loans	QLD Group	Bill Express	-
2007	Nike	Mitsubishi Electric	Yes Home Loans	Bankstown Sports Club	Yes Home Loans	-	Maico	-
2008	Nike	Mitsubishi Electric	-	Bankstown Sports Club	Maxim Home Loans	Maxim Home Loans	Sagem	-
2009	XBlades	Jaycar Electronics	Jaycar Electronics	Bankstown Sports Club	Laughter IS the best medicine	Camp Quality	Camp Quality	-
2010	XBlades	Jaycar Electronics	Jaycar Electronics	Doltone House	Autobarn	Camp Quality	Camp Quality	-
2011	Canterbury of New Zealand	Jaycar Electronics	Jaycar Electronics	Doltone House	Autobarn	Autobarn	Camp Quality	-
2012	Canterbury of New Zealand	Jaycar Electronics	Jaycar Electronics	Doltone House	Autobarn	Easy Forex	Camp Quality/Easy Forex	-
2013	Canterbury of New Zealand	Jaycar Electronics	Jaycar Electronics	Doltone House	Easy Forex	M&J Chickens	Camp Quality/M&J Chickens	-
2014-15	Canterbury of New Zealand	Jaycar Electronics	Jaycar Electronics	M&J Chickens	Easy Forex	M&J Chickens	M&J Chickens	-
2016	Canterbury of New Zealand	Jaycar Electronics	Jaycar Electronics	M&J Chickens	OpalSolar	M&J Chickens	M&J Chickens	-
2017	Canterbury of New Zealand	Kia	Jaycar Electronics	M&J Chickens	OpalSolar	Wicked Sister Desserts	Wicked Sister Desserts	-
2018	Canterbury of New Zealand	Kia	Jaycar Electronics	M&J Chickens	Ladbrokes	Wicked Sister Desserts	Wicked Sister Desserts	-
2019	Classic Sportswear	Kia	Ultimate Security	M&J Chickens	Ladbrokes	Waterview	CPE Australia	-
2020	Classic Sportswear		Ultimate Security	M&J Chickens	Ladbrokes	Waterview	Hitachi/CPE Australia	Sydney Tools
2021	Classic Sportswear	Laundy Hotels	Ultimate Security	OnSolar	The Jenny Souris Foundation	I’m In The Right	Hitachi/CPE Australia	Sydney Tools
2022	Classic Sportswear	Laundy Hotels	Ultimate Security	Young Academics	The Jenny Souris Foundation	Illuvium	Air Conditioning Guys/CPE Australia	Sydney Tools
2023	Classic Sportswear	Laundy Hotels	KFC	Young Academics	The Jenny Souris Foundation	Future Form	Air Conditioning Guys/CPE Australia	Sydney Tools
2024	Classic Sportswear	Laundy Hotels	KFC	Young Academics	The Jenny Souris Foundation	Supporting Disabilities Australia	Supporting Disabilities Australia/CPE Australia	Future Form
2025-	O'Neills	Laundy Hotels	KFC	Wattyl	Supporting Disabilities Australia	Young Academics	M&J Chickens/CPE Australia	Future Form

== Players ==
=== 2026 squad ===
Canterbury Bulldogs 2026 squad
Top 30 squad - 2026 NRL season			Supplementary list	Coaching staff
Matt Burton – FE; Stephen Crichton (c) – CE; Joshua Curran – PR, SR; Kade Dykes – FB, FE; Lachlan Galvin – HB; Harry Hayes – PR; Bailey Hayward – HK; Lipoi Hopoi – LK; Sam Hughes – PR; Viliame Kikau (vc) – SR	Max King – PR; Jacob Kiraz – WG, FB, CE; Finau Latu – LK; Zyon Maiu'u – PR; Kurt Mann – LK; Marcelo Montoya – WG; Sean O'Sullivan – HB, FE; Jacob Preston – SR; Jaeman Salmon – LK; Jonathan Sua – WG	Leo Thompson – PR; Jack Todd – LK, PR; Connor Tracey – FB; Enari Tuala – WG; Sitili Tupouniua – PR, SR; Jake Turpin – HK; Mitchell Woods – HB; Bronson Xerri – CE; Patrick Young – HK	Sosaia Alatini – CE; Alekolasimi Jones – SR; Gordon Chan Kum Tong – HK; Logan Spinks – SR; Jack Underhill – PR; Extended squad: Alex Conti – HB; Jethro Rinakama – WG	Manager: Phil Gould (general manager of football); Head coach: Cameron Ciraldo; Assistant coaches: Adam O'Brien; Chad Randall; Luke Vella; Jason Taylor (NSW Cup coach); Mick Potter (academy coach); Josh Jackson (Jersey Flegg coach); Trent Elkin (athletic performance & rehabilitation lead); Michael Kulen (head football analyst); Travis Touma (high performance manager); Managers: Adam Hartigan (chief of staff); Legend: (c) Captain(s); (vc) Vice-captain(s); Updated: 20 November 2026; Source(s): Bulldogs 2025

=== Hall of Fame ===
On 1 August 2015, the Canterbury-Bankstown Bulldogs announced the first five inductees into the Hall of Fame to celebrate their 80th anniversary. A further three former players were inducted during the club's 90th anniversary celebrations in February 2025.

Player #	Inductee	Active	Achievements	Games played
16	Eddie Burns	1935–1950	2× Premiership winner (1938, 1942) Coach: 1960–62, 1965	215
284	Les Johns	1963–1971	National Rugby League Hall of Fame inductee	103
402	George Peponis	1974–1982	1× Premiership winner (1980)	132
413	Steve Mortimer	1976–88	4× Premiership winner (1980, 1984, 1985, 1988) National Rugby League Hall of Fame inductee	273
477	Terry Lamb	1984–1996	3× Premiership winner (1984, 1988, 1995) National Rugby League Hall of Fame inductee	262
303	Johnny Greaves	1964–1972		112
432	Steve Folkes	1978–1991	4× Premiership winner (1980, 1984, 1985, 1988) Coach: 1998–2008 1× Premiership coach (2004)	245
605	Hazem El Masri	1996–2009	1× Premiership winner (2004) Club highest point scorer (2,418) Club highest try scorer (159)	317

=== Notable players ===
On 1 August 2015, the Canterbury-Bankstown Bulldogs announced a "Team of the Decade" to celebrate their 80th anniversary.

Bulldogs Team of the Decade
First team squad	Interchange	Coaching staff
1 Luke Patten – FB; 2 Hazem El Masri – WG; 3 Josh Morris – CE; 4 Willie Tonga – CE; 5 Matt Utai – WG; 6 Josh Reynolds – FE; 7 Trent Hodkinson – HB; 8 James Graham – PR; 9 Michael Ennis – HK; 10 Roy Asotasi – PR; 11 Sonny Bill Williams – SR; 12 Andrew Ryan – SR; 13 Greg Eastwood – LK	14 Aiden Tolman – PR; 15 Mark O'Meley – PR; 16 Willie Mason – PR; 17 Frank Pritchard – SR	Legend: (c) Captain(s); (vc) Vice-captain(s); Injured; Updated: 1 August 2015; Source(s): Bulldogs name team of decade

== Honours ==
- New South Wales Rugby League, Australian Rugby League and National Rugby League premiers: 8

1938, 1942, 1980, 1984, 1985, 1988, 1995, 2004

- New South Wales Rugby League, Australian Rugby League and National Rugby League runners-up: 10

1940, 1947, 1967, 1974, 1979, 1986, 1994, 1998, 2012, 2014

- New South Wales Rugby League, Australian Rugby League and National Rugby League minor premierships: 7

1938, 1942, 1947, 1984, 1993, 1994, 2012

Reserve/Pre-season Representative Honours

- New South Wales Rugby League Club Championships: 7

1938, 1939, 1993, 1994, 2009, 2010, 2011

- Pre-Season Cup titles: 2

1962, 1970

- Inter-City titles: 1

1939

- NRL State Championship: 1

2018

Junior Representative Honours:

- Jersey Flegg Premiers: 10

1963, 1971, 1976, 1979, 1983, 1999, 2000, 2001, 2003, 2023

(Record - Most Jersey Flegg Titles)

- SG Ball Premiers: 3

1972, 1978, 2009

- Harold Matthews Premiers: 4

2007, 2009, 2011, 2023

== NRL Women's team ==
Canterbury-Bankstown Bulldogs

Club information
- Full name: Canterbury-Bankstown Bulldogs Rugby League Club
- Nickname(s): Dogs, Doggies, The Family Club
- Colours: Blue; White
- Founded: Team: 28 Mar 2024; 2 years ago Club: 1935; 91 years ago
- Website: bulldogs.com.au

Current details
- Grounds: Stadium Australia (84,000); Belmore Sports Ground (19,000)
- CEO: Aaron Warburton
- Chairman: Adam Driussi
- Coach: Brayden Wiliame
- Manager: Phil Gould
- Captain: Tayla Preston; Angelina Teakaraanga-Katoa
- Competition: NRL Women's Premiership
- Current season

Uniforms
Home colours	Away colours

On 28 March 2024, the NRL announced that the Bulldogs were one of two clubs granted permission to join the NRL Women's Premiership from the 2025 season. The club subsequently announced the appointment of Blake Cavallaro as their inaugural NRLW coach and, in July 2024, their first player signings. Cavallaro resigned in January 2025.

On 7 April 2025 Brayden Wiliame was announced as head-coach for the club's inaugural NRLW season.

The inaugural 24 player NRLW squad, along with 4 NRLW Development Contracted players, was announced May 12, 2025.

The inaugural squad is as follows

- Alexis Tauaneai
- Andie Robinson
- Angelina Teakaraanga-Katoa
- Anneka Wilson
- Ashleigh Quinlan
- Bridget Hoy
- Ebony Prior
- Elizabeth MacGregor
- Holli Wheeler
- Hope Millard
- Kalosipani Hopoate
- Latisha Smythe
- Maatuleio Fotu-Moala
- Moana Courtenay
- Monica Tagoai
- Paea Uilou
- Pauline Suli-Ruka
- Sarahcen Oliver
- Shaniece Monschau
- Shannon Muru
- Shaquaylah Mahakitau-Monschau
- Tayla Preston
- Tegan Dymock
- Vani Buleki

NRLW Development Contracted Players

- Lahnayah Mahakitau-Monschau
- Leilani Wilson
- Simina Lokotui
- Waimarie Martin

== NRLW Season summaries ==
P=Premiers, R=Runner-Ups, M=Minor Premierships, F=Finals Appearance, W=Wooden Spoons (brackets represent finals games)
Competition	Games Played	Games Won	Games Drawn	Games Lost	Ladder Position	P	R	M	F	W	Coach	Captain	Details
2025 NRL Women's season	11	3	1	7	9 / 12						Brayden Wiliame	Tayla Preston and Angelina Teakaraanga-Katoa (Co-captains)	Canterbury-Bankstown Bulldogs NRLW 2025

== Other Women's teams ==
The club runs women's teams in pathway competitions facilitated by the New South Wales Rugby League - the open-age Harvey Norman Women's Premiership, Under 19 Tarsha Gale Cup, and Under 17 Lisa Fiaola Cup.

== Canterbury-Bankstown District Juniors ==
Current Canterbury-Bankstown junior clubs are:

- Bankstown Bulls
- Bankstown Sports
- Berala Bears
- Chester Hill Hornets
- East Hills Bulldogs
- Greenacre Tigers
- Milperra Colts
- Moorebank Rams
- Revesby Heights Rhinos
- St Christophers
- St George Dragons
- St Johns Eagles

In 1908 and 1909 the only districts with Junior Leagues were South Sydney and Balmain. The first clubs from the Canterbury district to participate in rugby league were Belmore in the NSWRL 2nd grade competition, and Campsie Triers in the Western Suburbs A Grade. When the St George JRL was established in 1911, Canterbury clubs were allocated to this competition. In 1922 the Canterbury JRL was established and Campsie Iona with 17 points edged out Wattle Hill 16 for the A Grade title, Lakemba won B Grade and Wattle Hill the C Grade. Campsie Iona repeated their A grade success in 1923, 1924 and 1925 before Belmore stopped their run in 1926.
