= George Main (rugby league) =

Rugby league footballer

Personal information
- Born: 19 October 1910 Newtown, New South Wales, Australia
- Died: 15 March 1970 (aged 59)

Playing information
- Position: Fullback
Club
Years	Team	Pld	T	G	FG	P
1935–37	Canterbury-Bankstown	19	0	42	0	84

George Main (1910–1970) was an Australian professional rugby league footballer who played in the 1930s. He played three seasons for Canterbury-Bankstown of the New South Wales Rugby League Premiership. A goal-kicking fullback, Main played for the struggling Canterbury side who were playing their first seasons of professional football.

== Playing career ==
On Anzac Day, 1935, Main made his debut with the new Canterbury club (who played their first game in club history) against North Sydney. North Sydney would win the game 20-5. 3 rounds later, Main scored his first career points, kicking 3 goals in Canterbury's 22-14 loss to Newtown. In Round 5, Main played in a record-breaking 91-6 loss to the St. George Dragons. The game still remains as the largest winning margin (85) in a NSWRL/NRL game.

In Round 8, he recorded a respectable 6 goals against the eventual wooden spooners for the 1935 season, University. He helped his club win their first game in history, winning 21-2 after holding onto a 5-2 lead at half-time. One round later, Main kicked 5 goals against Western Suburbs, but his side lost 25-19. Main was employed as the side's regular goal kicker for the remainder of the season. At the conclusion of 1935, Main scored 29 goals in 14 appearances, totaling 58 points. He was Canterbury's leader in goals scored and points scored.

After Main's solid 1935 season, he struggled to consistently play games. He only made 3 appearances in 1936, scoring 8 goals.

The following year, he only played the two opening rounds of the season, before finishing his career. He played the final game of his career in a Round 2 loss to South Sydney, kicking 3 goals. Main concluded his career with 42 goals (84 points) in 19 appearances.
