= Camp Quality =

Australian children's cancer charity

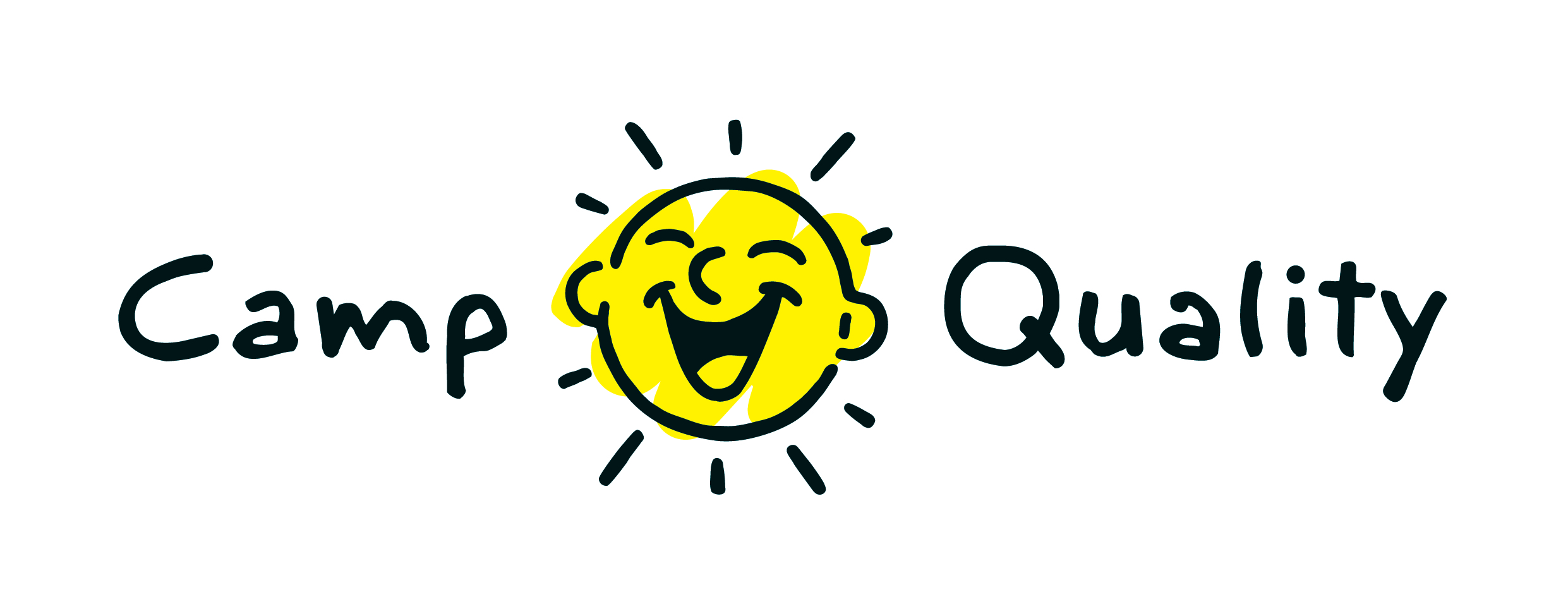
- Founded: 1983; 43 years ago
- Founder: Vera Entwistle
- Purpose: Children facing cancer and their families
- Origins: Sydney, Australia
- Region served: Australia
- Key people: Deborah Thomas (CEO)
- Website: campquality.org.au

Camp Quality is an Australian non-governmental and non-profit organisation with offices in Sydney, Melbourne, Perth, Adelaide, Newcastle and Brisbane, offering cancer support nationally. Camp Quality's programs and services are designed specifically for children aged up to 15 years, and their families. In 2021 there were 9,108 kids and 4,114 families impacted by cancer registered for their programs and services.

Camp Quality is registered as a charity by the Australian Charities and Not-For-Profits Commission as a public benevolent institution.

== History ==
Camp Quality was founded by Vera Entwistle in Australia in 1983. The name of the organisation was sourced from a conversation with a pediatric oncologist, who told Entwistle that "No one can do anything about the quantity of life, but we all can do something about the quality."

Entwistle later introduced Camp Quality to several countries, including the United States and Canada.

== Programs and services ==
=== Recreation programs ===
Camp Quality is best known for their camps which are run across Australia.

== Fundraising ==
In the 2019 financial year, Camp Quality reported total income of $14.1 million, derived from events & community fundraising (28%), corporate income (24%), general donations (16%), volunteer contributions (18%), private & government grants (7%), ORANGES Toolkit revenue (4%), and bequests (3%).
