= TradingView =

Analysis platform for traders and investors

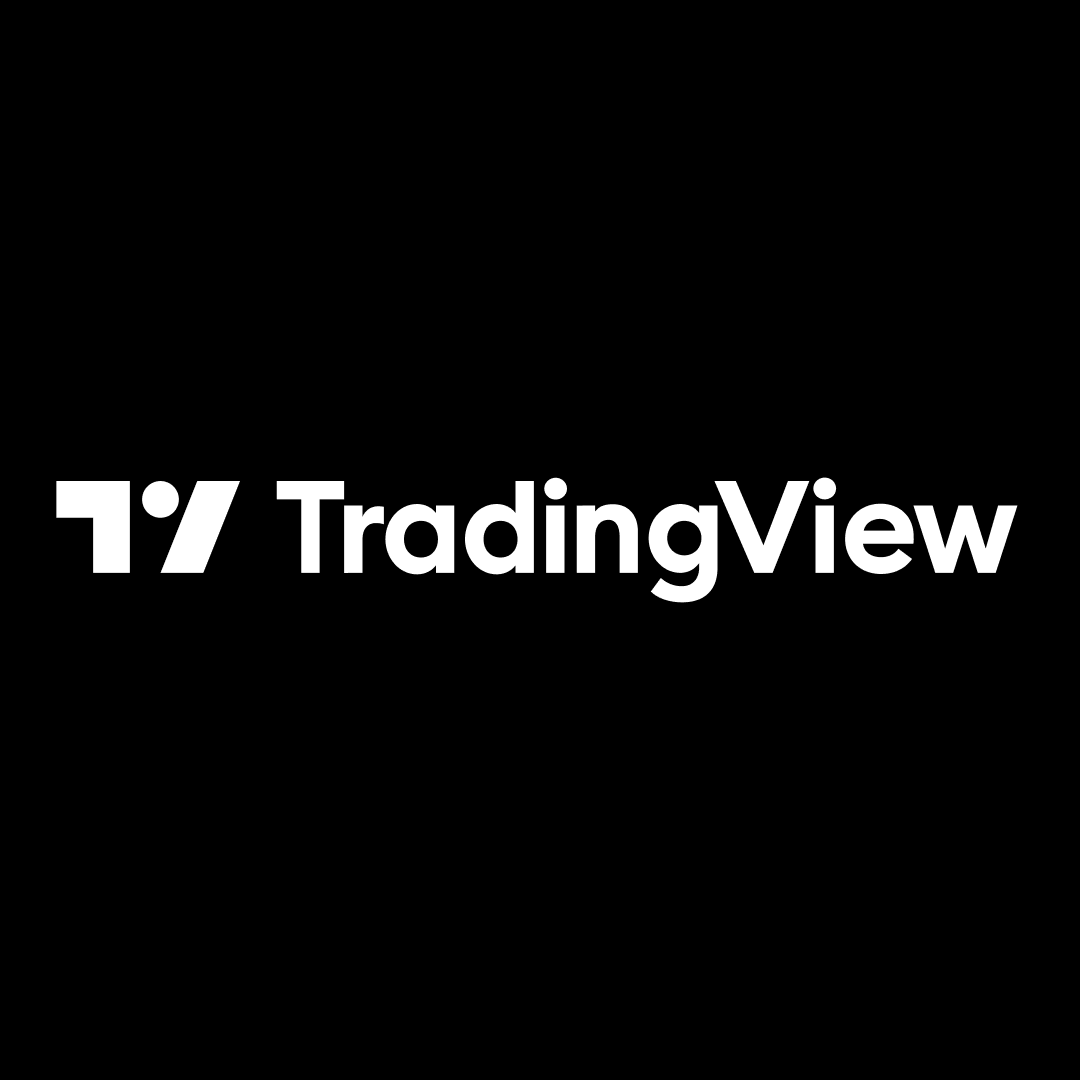
- Type: Private
- Industry: Analytical platform and social network for traders
- Founded: 2011; 15 years ago
- Headquarters: New York City, United States
- Key people: Oleg Mukhanov (CEO)
- Website: www.tradingview.com/about/

TradingView is an American-British social media network, social trading network, financial analysis platform and mobile app for traders and investors. The company was founded in 2011 and has offices in New York, Málaga, Tbilisi and London. As of 2020, the company ranks in the top 130 websites globally according to Alexa.

== History ==
TradingView was founded in 2011. TradingView is headquartered in New York and has its European market headquarters in London.

The platform aims to help users around the world better understand financial markets by discussing investment ideas in an open forum. In the summer of 2013, the project was selected for the startup accelerator Techstars, where it signed contracts with Microsoft and CME. The company later received $3.6 million in funding from iTech Capital and other investors (TechStars, Right Side Capital Management, Irish Angels).

In May 2018, the company closed another round of venture investment for $37 million led by Insight Venture Partners, DRW Venture Capital and Jump Capital, acquiring TradeIT. In October 2021, as part of the next round of financing, TradingView was valued at $3 billion and attracted an additional $298 million from investors, including Tiger Global Management.

== See also ==
- List of electronic trading platforms
