= 2023 Cronulla-Sutherland Sharks season =

- NRL Rank: 6th
- 2023 record: Wins: 14; draws: 0; losses: 10
- Points scored: For: 619; against: 497

Team information
- CEO: Dino Mezzatesta
- Coach: Craig Fitzgibbon
- Assistant coach: Josh Hannay; Daniel Holdsworth; Steve Price
- Captain: Wade Graham (17 games) Dale Finucane (13 games) Nicho Hynes (5 games)
- Stadium: PointsBet Stadium (10 games); Suncorp Stadium (1 game); C.ex Coffs International Stadium (1 game)
- Avg. attendance: 11,090

Top scorers
- Tries: Ronaldo Mulitalo (21)
- Goals: Nicho Hynes (83)
- Points: Nicho Hynes (187)
← 2022	2024 →

The 2023 Cronulla-Sutherland Sharks season is the 57th in the club's history. The club is coached by Craig Fitzgibbon in his second season with the Sharks and captained by Dale Finucane and Wade Graham. The team is currently competing in the National Rugby League's 2023 Telstra Premiership.

== Milestones ==
- Round 1: Oregon Kaufusi made his debut for the club, after previously playing for the Parramatta Eels.
- Round 3: Jesse Ramien played his 100th career game.
- Round 5: Teig Wilton played his 50th career and club game.
- Round 5: Ronaldo Mulitalo scored his 50th career try for the club.
- Round 8: Sione Katoa scored his 50th career try for the club.
- Round 15: Daniel Atkinson made his debut for the club, after previously playing for the Melbourne Storm.
- Round 16: Briton Nikora played his 100th career and club game.
- Round 16: Tom Hazelton scored his 1st career try for the club.
- Round 18: Blayke Brailey played his 100th career and club game.
- Round 23: Wade Graham played his 250th game for the club.
- Round 23: Jesse Ramien played his 100th game for the club.
- Round 23: Royce Hunt played his 50th game for the club.
- Round 24: Matt Moylan played his 100th game for the club.

== Fixtures ==
=== Pre-season ===
Date	Round	Opponent	Venue	Result	Score	Tries	Goals	Field Goals	Report
10 February	Trial Match	Newcastle Knights	Central Coast Stadium, Gosford	Win	28-16	Tom Rodwell (3') 1 Mawene Hiroti (31') 1 Tom Hazelton (38') 1 Daniel Atkinson (46') 1 Josh Finau (80') 1	Niwhai Puru 3/3 (5', 40', 48'); Daniel Atkinson 1/1 (80'); Mawene Hiroti 0/1		
Team Details: FB / 1 / Daniel Atkinson; WG / 2 / Tom Rodwell; CE / 3 / Mawene Hiroti; CE / 4 / Kayal Iro; WG / 5 / Sam Stonestreet; FE / 6 / Wade Graham (c); HB / 7 / Niwhai Puru; PR / 8 / Toby Rudolf; HK / 9 / Jayden Berrell; PR / 10 / Braden Hamlin-Uele; SR / 11 / Teig Wilton; SR / 12 / Jesse Colquhoun; LK / 13 / Jack Williams; Interchange: IC / 14 / Cameron McInnes; IC / 15 / Josh Finau; IC / 16 / Tom Hazelton; IC / 17 / Max Bradbury; IC / 18 / Lachlan Crouch; IC / 19 / Henry O'Kane; IC / 20 / Sam Healey; IC / 21 / Jacob Gagan; IC / 22 / Blake Hosking; IC / 23 / Max Riolo; IC / 24 / Manaia Waitere; IC / 25 / Oregon Kaufusi; IC / 26 / Kobie Wilson; Coach: / / Craig Fitzgibbon
19 February	Trial Match	Canterbury-Bankstown Bulldogs	Belmore Sports Ground, Sydney	Win	36-16	Teig Wilton (26', 43') 2 Ronaldo Mulitalo (38', 47') 2 Sione Katoa (16') 1 Sam Stonestreet (62') 1	Nicho Hynes 5/5 (17', 27', 39', 45', 48'); Braydon Trindall 1/1 (64')		
Team Details: FB / 1 / William Kennedy; WG / 2 / Sione Katoa; CE / 3 / Jesse Ramien; CE / 4 / Siosifa Talakai; WG / 5 / Ronaldo Mulitalo; FE / 6 / Matt Moylan; HB / 7 / Nicho Hynes; PR / 8 / Toby Rudolf; HK / 9 / Blayke Brailey; PR / 17 / Braden Hamlin-Uele; SR / 11 / Briton Nikora; SR / 12 / Teig Wilton; LK / 13 / Dale Finucane (c); Interchange: IC / 14 / Cameron McInnes; IC / 15 / Wade Graham; IC / 16 / Oregon Kaufusi; IC / 18 / Braydon Trindall; IC / 19 / Jack Williams; IC / 20 / Mawene Hiroti; IC / 21 / Jesse Colquhoun; IC / 22 / Jayden Berrell; IC / 23 / Niwhai Puru; IC / 24 / Tom Hazelton; IC / 25 / Kayal Iro; IC / 26 / Daniel Atkinson; IC / 27 / Sam Stonestreet; IC / 29 / Josh Finau; Reserves: RE / 10 / Royce Hunt; Coach: / / Craig Fitzgibbon
Legend: Win Loss Draw Bye

=== Regular season ===
Date	Round	Opponent	Venue	Result	Score	Tries	Goals	Field Goals	Report
4 March	1	South Sydney Rabbitohs	PointsBet Stadium, Sydney	Loss	18-27	Braydon Trindall (19') 1 Sione Katoa (39') 1 Teig Wilton (71') 1	Braydon Trindall 3/3 (21', 40', 72')		
Team Details: FB / 1 / William Kennedy; WG / 2 / Sione Katoa; CE / 3 / Jesse Ramien; CE / 4 / Siosifa Talakai; WG / 5 / Ronaldo Mulitalo; FE / 6 / Matt Moylan; HB / 7 / Braydon Trindall; PR / 8 / Toby Rudolf; HK / 9 / Blayke Brailey; PR / 10 / Braden Hamlin-Uele; SR / 11 / Briton Nikora; SR / 12 / Teig Wilton; LK / 13 / Dale Finucane (c); Interchange: IC / 14 / Cameron McInnes; IC / 15 / Wade Graham (c); IC / 16 / Oregon Kaufusi; IC / 17 / Jack Williams; Concussion Substitute: RE / 19 / Mawene Hiroti; Reserves: RE / 18 / Connor Tracey; RE / 20 / Tom Hazelton; RE / 21 / Jayden Berrell; RE / 22 / Niwhai Puru; Coach: / / Craig Fitzgibbon
10 March	2	Parramatta Eels	CommBank Stadium, Sydney	Win	30-26	William Kennedy (18', 36', 55') 3 Briton Nikora (14') 1 Ronaldo Mulitalo (60') 1	Braydon Trindall 5/5 (16', 19', 37', 56', 62')		
Team Details: FB / 1 / William Kennedy; WG / 2 / Sione Katoa; CE / 3 / Jesse Ramien; CE / 4 / Siosifa Talakai; WG / 5 / Ronaldo Mulitalo; FE / 6 / Matt Moylan; HB / 7 / Braydon Trindall; PR / 8 / Toby Rudolf; HK / 9 / Blayke Brailey; PR / 10 / Braden Hamlin-Uele; SR / 11 / Briton Nikora; SR / 12 / Teig Wilton; LK / 13 / Dale Finucane (c); Interchange: IC / 14 / Cameron McInnes; IC / 15 / Royce Hunt; IC / 16 / Oregon Kaufusi; IC / 17 / Connor Tracey (Note: Was named on the bench but did not enter the game.); Concussion Substitute: RE / 18 / Tom Hazelton; Reserves: RE / 19 / Mawene Hiroti; RE / 20 / Max Bradbury; RE / 21 / Jayden Berrell; RE / 22 / Niwhai Puru; Coach: / / Craig Fitzgibbon
19 March	3	Canberra Raiders	GIO Stadium, Canberra	Loss	20-24	William Kennedy (6') 1 Ronaldo Mulitalo (33') 1 Jesse Ramien (55') 1 Briton Nikora (71') 1	Braydon Trindall 2/3 (8', 72'); Siosifa Talakai 0/1		
Team Details: FB / 1 / William Kennedy; WG / 2 / Sione Katoa; CE / 3 / Jesse Ramien; CE / 4 / Siosifa Talakai; WG / 5 / Ronaldo Mulitalo; FE / 6 / Matt Moylan; HB / 7 / Braydon Trindall; PR / 8 / Toby Rudolf; HK / 9 / Blayke Brailey; PR / 10 / Braden Hamlin-Uele; SR / 11 / Briton Nikora; SR / 12 / Teig Wilton; LK / 13 / Dale Finucane (c); Interchange: IC / 14 / Cameron McInnes; IC / 15 / Royce Hunt; IC / 16 / Oregon Kaufusi; IC / 17 / Jack Williams; Concussion Substitute: RE / 18 / Connor Tracey; Reserves: RE / 19 / Tom Hazelton; RE / 20 / Mawene Hiroti; RE / 21 / Jayden Berrell; RE / 22 / Daniel Atkinson; Coach: / / Craig Fitzgibbon
26 March	4	St. George Illawarra Dragons	Netstrata Jubilee Stadium, Sydney	Win	40-8	Ronaldo Mulitalo (43', 57') 2 Jesse Ramien (31', 59') 2 William Kennedy (7') 1 Briton Nikora (50') 1 Sione Katoa (68') 1	Nicho Hynes 5/7 (8', 33', 52', 60', 70'); Siosifa Talakai 1/1 (79' pen)		
Team Details: FB / 1 / William Kennedy; WG / 2 / Sione Katoa; CE / 3 / Jesse Ramien; CE / 4 / Siosifa Talakai; WG / 5 / Ronaldo Mulitalo; FE / 6 / Matt Moylan; HB / 7 / Nicho Hynes; PR / 8 / Toby Rudolf; HK / 9 / Blayke Brailey; PR / 10 / Braden Hamlin-Uele; SR / 11 / Briton Nikora; SR / 12 / Teig Wilton; LK / 13 / Dale Finucane (c); Interchange: IC / 14 / Cameron McInnes; IC / 15 / Royce Hunt; IC / 16 / Oregon Kaufusi; IC / 18 / Jack Williams; Concussion Substitute: RE / 19 / Mawene Hiroti; Reserves: RE / 17 / Braydon Trindall; RE / 20 / Tom Hazelton; RE / 21 / Jayden Berrell; RE / 22 / Connor Tracey; Coach: / / Craig Fitzgibbon
2 April	5	New Zealand Warriors	PointsBet Stadium, Sydney	Loss	30-32	Ronaldo Mulitalo (4', 55') 2 Teig Wilton (1') 1 Sione Katoa (14') 1 William Kennedy (26') 1	Nicho Hynes 5/7 (2', 6', 15', 18' pen, 28')		
Team Details: FB / 1 / William Kennedy; WG / 2 / Sione Katoa; CE / 3 / Jesse Ramien; CE / 4 / Siosifa Talakai; WG / 5 / Ronaldo Mulitalo; FE / 6 / Matt Moylan; HB / 7 / Nicho Hynes; PR / 8 / Toby Rudolf; HK / 9 / Blayke Brailey; PR / 10 / Braden Hamlin-Uele; SR / 11 / Briton Nikora; SR / 12 / Teig Wilton; LK / 13 / Dale Finucane (c); Interchange: IC / 14 / Cameron McInnes; IC / 15 / Royce Hunt; IC / 16 / Jack Williams; IC / 17 / Braydon Trindall; Concussion Substitute: RE / 21 / Sam Stonestreet; Reserves: RE / 18 / Connor Tracey; RE / 19 / Tom Hazelton; RE / 20 / Mawene Hiroti; RE / 22 / Tuku Hau Tapuha; Coach: / / Craig Fitzgibbon
	6	Bye							
14 April	7	Sydney Roosters	PointsBet Stadium, Sydney	Win	22-12	Matt Moylan (20') 1 Ronaldo Mulitalo (45') 1 Blayke Brailey (68') 1 Briton Nikora (76') 1	Nicho Hynes 3/5 (15' pen, 21', 77')		
Team Details: FB / 1 / William Kennedy; WG / 2 / Sione Katoa; CE / 3 / Jesse Ramien; CE / 4 / Siosifa Talakai; WG / 5 / Ronaldo Mulitalo; FE / 6 / Matt Moylan; HB / 7 / Nicho Hynes (c); PR / 16 / Oregon Kaufusi; HK / 9 / Blayke Brailey; PR / 10 / Braden Hamlin-Uele; SR / 11 / Briton Nikora; SR / 12 / Teig Wilton; LK / 13 / Cameron McInnes; Interchange: IC / 8 / Royce Hunt; IC / 14 / Wade Graham (c); IC / 15 / Jack Williams; IC / 17 / Tom Hazelton; Concussion Substitute: RE / 18 / Braydon Trindall; Reserves: RE / 19 / Connor Tracey; RE / 20 / Tuku Hau Tapuha; RE / 21 / Mawene Hiroti; RE / 22 / Jayden Berrell; Coach: / / Craig Fitzgibbon
22 April	8	Canterbury-Bankstown Bulldogs	Accor Stadium, Sydney	Win	33-20	William Kennedy (6', 9', 22') 3 Matt Moylan (41') 1 Sione Katoa (56') 1	Nicho Hynes 6/6 (8', 10', 23', 43', 57', 75' pen)	Nicho Hynes 1/2 (79')	
Team Details: FB / 1 / William Kennedy; WG / 2 / Sione Katoa; CE / 3 / Jesse Ramien; CE / 4 / Siosifa Talakai; WG / 5 / Ronaldo Mulitalo; FE / 6 / Matt Moylan; HB / 7 / Nicho Hynes (c); PR / 8 / Oregon Kaufusi; HK / 9 / Blayke Brailey; PR / 10 / Braden Hamlin-Uele; SR / 11 / Briton Nikora; SR / 12 / Teig Wilton; LK / 13 / Cameron McInnes; Interchange: IC / 14 / Wade Graham (c); IC / 15 / Jack Williams; IC / 16 / Royce Hunt; IC / 17 / Tom Hazelton; Concussion Substitute: RE / 18 / Braydon Trindall; Reserves: RE / 19 / Connor Tracey; RE / 20 / Tuku Hau Tapuha; RE / 21 / Mawene Hiroti; RE / 22 / Jayden Berrell; Coach: / / Craig Fitzgibbon
27 April	9	North Queensland Cowboys	PointsBet Stadium, Sydney	Win	44-6	Ronaldo Mulitalo (43', 57') 2 Siosifa Talakai (1') 1 Jesse Ramien (13') 1 Sione Katoa (27') 1 Nicho Hynes (59') 1 Teig Wilton (73') 1	Nicho Hynes 8/9 (3', 10' pen, 14', 28', 46' pen, 58', 61', 75')		
Team Details: FB / 1 / William Kennedy; WG / 2 / Sione Katoa; CE / 3 / Jesse Ramien; CE / 4 / Siosifa Talakai; WG / 5 / Ronaldo Mulitalo; FE / 6 / Matt Moylan; HB / 7 / Nicho Hynes (c); PR / 8 / Oregon Kaufusi; HK / 9 / Blayke Brailey; PR / 10 / Braden Hamlin-Uele; SR / 11 / Briton Nikora; SR / 12 / Teig Wilton; LK / 13 / Cameron McInnes; Interchange: IC / 14 / Wade Graham (c); IC / 15 / Jack Williams; IC / 16 / Royce Hunt; IC / 17 / Tom Hazelton; Concussion Substitute: IC / 18 / Braydon Trindall (Note: 18th man was activated during the match due to foul play.); Reserves: RE / 19 / Connor Tracey; RE / 20 / Jesse Colquhoun; RE / 21 / Mawene Hiroti; RE / 22 / Jayden Berrell; Coach: / / Craig Fitzgibbon
6 May	10	Dolphins	Suncorp Stadium, Brisbane	Loss	16-36	Ronaldo Mulitalo (36') 1 William Kennedy (38') 1 Teig Wilton (66') 1	Nicho Hynes 2/3 (39', 67')		
Team Details: FB / 1 / William Kennedy; WG / 2 / Sione Katoa; CE / 3 / Jesse Ramien; CE / 4 / Siosifa Talakai; WG / 5 / Ronaldo Mulitalo; FE / 6 / Matt Moylan; HB / 7 / Nicho Hynes; PR / 8 / Oregon Kaufusi; HK / 9 / Blayke Brailey; PR / 10 / Royce Hunt; SR / 11 / Briton Nikora; SR / 12 / Teig Wilton; LK / 14 / Cameron McInnes; Interchange: IC / 13 / Dale Finucane (c); IC / 15 / Jack Williams; IC / 16 / Wade Graham (c); IC / 17 / Tom Hazelton; Concussion Substitute: RE / 18 / Braydon Trindall; Reserves: RE / 19 / Connor Tracey; RE / 20 / Jesse Colquhoun; RE / 21 / Mawene Hiroti; RE / 22 / Jayden Berrell; Coach: / / Craig Fitzgibbon
14 May	11	Manly Sea Eagles	4 Pines Park, Sydney	Win	20-14	Royce Hunt (5') 1 Sione Katoa (30') 1 Jesse Ramien (47') 1	Nicho Hynes 4/4 (7', 19' pen, 31', 49')		
Team Details: FB / 1 / William Kennedy; WG / 2 / Sione Katoa; CE / 3 / Jesse Ramien; CE / 19 / Connor Tracey; WG / 5 / Ronaldo Mulitalo; FE / 6 / Matt Moylan; HB / 7 / Nicho Hynes; PR / 14 / Cameron McInnes; HK / 9 / Blayke Brailey; PR / 10 / Royce Hunt; SR / 11 / Briton Nikora; SR / 12 / Teig Wilton; LK / 13 / Dale Finucane (c); Interchange: IC / 15 / Jack Williams; IC / 16 / Wade Graham (c); IC / 17 / Tom Hazelton; IC / 18 / Braydon Trindall; Concussion Substitute: RE / 21 / Mawene Hiroti; Reserves: RE / 4 / Siosifa Talakai; RE / 8 / Oregon Kaufusi; RE / 20 / Jesse Colquhoun; RE / 22 / Jayden Berrell; Coach: / / Craig Fitzgibbon
20 May	12	Newcastle Knights	C.ex Coffs International Stadium, Coffs Harbour	Win	26-6	William Kennedy (6') 1 Ronaldo Mulitalo (26') 1 Connor Tracey (44') 1 Royce Hunt (69') 1	Nicho Hynes 5/5 (8', 27', 46', 55' pen, 70')		
Team Details: FB / 1 / William Kennedy; WG / 2 / Sione Katoa; CE / 3 / Jesse Ramien; CE / 4 / Connor Tracey; WG / 5 / Ronaldo Mulitalo; FE / 6 / Matt Moylan; HB / 7 / Nicho Hynes; PR / 8 / Oregon Kaufusi; HK / 9 / Blayke Brailey; PR / 10 / Royce Hunt; SR / 11 / Briton Nikora; SR / 12 / Teig Wilton; LK / 13 / Dale Finucane (c); Interchange: IC / 15 / Jack Williams; IC / 16 / Wade Graham (c); IC / 17 / Tom Hazelton; IC / 20 / Braden Hamlin-Uele; Concussion Substitute: RE / 18 / Daniel Atkinson; Reserves: RE / 14 / Braydon Trindall; RE / 19 / Mawene Hiroti; RE / 21 / Jesse Colquhoun; RE / 22 / Jayden Berrell; Coach: / / Craig Fitzgibbon
	13	Bye							
3 June	14	Brisbane Broncos	PointsBet Stadium, Sydney	Loss	12-20	Siosifa Talakai (21') 1 William Kennedy (75') 1	Nicho Hynes 2/2 (23', 75')		
Team Details: FB / 1 / William Kennedy; WG / 2 / Sione Katoa; CE / 3 / Jesse Ramien; CE / 4 / Siosifa Talakai; WG / 5 / Ronaldo Mulitalo; FE / 6 / Matt Moylan; HB / 7 / Nicho Hynes; PR / 8 / Oregon Kaufusi; HK / 9 / Blayke Brailey; PR / 10 / Royce Hunt; SR / 11 / Briton Nikora; SR / 12 / Teig Wilton; LK / 13 / Dale Finucane (c); Interchange: IC / 14 / Wade Graham (c); IC / 15 / Jack Williams; IC / 16 / Tom Hazelton; IC / 17 / Braden Hamlin-Uele; Concussion Substitute: RE / 18 / Braydon Trindall; Reserves: RE / 19 / Connor Tracey; RE / 20 / Jesse Colquhoun; RE / 21 / Daniel Atkinson; RE / 22 / Jayden Berrell; Coach: / / Craig Fitzgibbon
11 June	15	Melbourne Storm	AAMI Park, Melbourne	Loss	10-54	Teig Wilton (7') 1 Ronaldo Mulitalo (76') 1	Nicho Hynes 1/3 (9')		
Team Details: FB / 1 / William Kennedy; WG / 2 / Sione Katoa; CE / 3 / Jesse Ramien; CE / 4 / Siosifa Talakai; WG / 5 / Ronaldo Mulitalo; FE / 6 / Matt Moylan; HB / 7 / Nicho Hynes; PR / 17 / Braden Hamlin-Uele; HK / 9 / Blayke Brailey; PR / 10 / Royce Hunt; SR / 11 / Briton Nikora; SR / 12 / Teig Wilton; LK / 13 / Dale Finucane (c); Interchange: IC / 8 / Oregon Kaufusi; IC / 14 / Cameron McInnes; IC / 15 / Wade Graham (c); IC / 16 / Jack Williams; Concussion Substitute: IC / 21 / Daniel Atkinson; Reserves: RE / 18 / Braydon Trindall; RE / 19 / Connor Tracey; RE / 20 / Tom Hazelton; RE / 22 / Jesse Colquhoun; Coach: / / Craig Fitzgibbon
18 June	16	Canterbury-Bankstown Bulldogs	PointsBet Stadium, Sydney	Win	48-10	Teig Wilton (8') 1 Braden Hamlin-Uele (17') 1 Ronaldo Mulitalo (24') 1 Cameron McInnes (33') 1 Jack Williams (36') 1 Tom Hazelton (47') 1 Briton Nikora (54') 1 Jesse Ramien (59') 1	Nicho Hynes 8/9 (10', 12' pen, 19', 35', 37', 48', 55', 61')		
Team Details: FB / 1 / William Kennedy; WG / 2 / Sione Katoa; CE / 3 / Jesse Ramien; CE / 4 / Siosifa Talakai; WG / 5 / Ronaldo Mulitalo; FE / 6 / Matt Moylan; HB / 7 / Nicho Hynes; PR / 8 / Oregon Kaufusi; HK / 9 / Blayke Brailey; PR / 10 / Braden Hamlin-Uele; SR / 11 / Briton Nikora; SR / 12 / Teig Wilton; LK / 13 / Dale Finucane (c); Interchange: IC / 14 / Cameron McInnes; IC / 15 / Wade Graham (c); IC / 16 / Jack Williams; IC / 17 / Tom Hazelton; Concussion Substitute: RE / 18 / Connor Tracey; Reserves: RE / 19 / Braydon Trindall; RE / 20 / Toby Rudolf; RE / 21 / Daniel Atkinson; RE / 22 / Jesse Colquhoun; Coach: / / Craig Fitzgibbon
	17	Bye							
29 June	18	St. George Illawarra Dragons	PointsBet Stadium, Sydney	Win	52-16	Briton Nikora (24', 76') 2 Ronaldo Mulitalo (55', 70') 2 Nicho Hynes (7') 1 Jesse Ramien (31') 1 Tom Hazelton (39') 1 William Kennedy (59') 1 Siosifa Talakai (67') 1	Nicho Hynes 8/9 (9', 26', 33', 40', 56', 69', 71', 77')		
Team Details: FB / 1 / William Kennedy; WG / 2 / Sione Katoa; CE / 3 / Jesse Ramien; CE / 4 / Siosifa Talakai; WG / 5 / Ronaldo Mulitalo; FE / 6 / Matt Moylan; HB / 7 / Nicho Hynes; PR / 8 / Oregon Kaufusi; HK / 9 / Blayke Brailey; PR / 10 / Braden Hamlin-Uele; SR / 11 / Briton Nikora; SR / 12 / Teig Wilton; LK / 13 / Dale Finucane (c); Interchange: IC / 14 / Cameron McInnes; IC / 15 / Tom Hazelton; IC / 16 / Jack Williams; IC / 17 / Wade Graham (c); Concussion Substitute: RE / 18 / Connor Tracey; Reserves: RE / 19 / Mawene Hiroti; RE / 20 / Toby Rudolf; RE / 21 / Braydon Trindall; RE / 22 / Jesse Colquhoun; Coach: / / Craig Fitzgibbon
6 July	19	Wests Tigers	CommBank Stadium, Sydney	Win	36-12	Sione Katoa (15', 45', 79') 3 Siosifa Talakai (22', 67') 2 Jesse Ramien (56') 1 Nicho Hynes (72') 1	Nicho Hynes 4/8 (11' pen, 23', 46', 69')		
Team Details: FB / 1 / William Kennedy; WG / 2 / Sione Katoa; CE / 3 / Jesse Ramien; CE / 4 / Siosifa Talakai; WG / 5 / Ronaldo Mulitalo; FE / 6 / Matt Moylan; HB / 7 / Nicho Hynes (c); PR / 8 / Oregon Kaufusi; HK / 9 / Blayke Brailey; PR / 10 / Toby Rudolf; SR / 11 / Briton Nikora; SR / 12 / Teig Wilton; LK / 13 / Cameron McInnes; Interchange: IC / 14 / Jack Williams; IC / 15 / Wade Graham (c); IC / 16 / Jesse Colquhoun; IC / 17 / Tom Hazelton; Concussion Substitute: RE / 19 / Braydon Trindall; Reserves: RE / 18 / Connor Tracey; RE / 20 / Tuku Hau Tapuha; RE / 21 / Mawene Hiroti; RE / 22 / Jayden Berrell; Coach: / / Craig Fitzgibbon
16 July	20	New Zealand Warriors	Go Media Stadium, Auckland	Loss	12-44	Nicho Hynes (9') 1 Briton Nikora (73') 1	Nicho Hynes 2/2 (10', 74')		
Team Details: FB / 1 / William Kennedy; WG / 2 / Sione Katoa; CE / 3 / Jesse Ramien; CE / 4 / Siosifa Talakai; WG / 5 / Ronaldo Mulitalo; FE / 6 / Matt Moylan; HB / 7 / Nicho Hynes (c); PR / 8 / Oregon Kaufusi; HK / 9 / Blayke Brailey; PR / 10 / Toby Rudolf; SR / 11 / Briton Nikora; SR / 12 / Teig Wilton; LK / 13 / Cameron McInnes; Interchange: IC / 14 / Wade Graham (c); IC / 15 / Tom Hazelton; IC / 16 / Jack Williams; IC / 17 / Jesse Colquhoun; Concussion Substitute: RE / 18 / Connor Tracey; Reserves: RE / 19 / Kayal Iro; RE / 20 / Braden Hamlin-Uele; RE / 21 / Braydon Trindall; RE / 22 / Tuku Hau Tapuha; Coach: / / Craig Fitzgibbon
23 July	21	Manly Sea Eagles	PointsBet Stadium, Sydney	Loss	26-30	Ronaldo Mulitalo (46') 1 Sione Katoa (59') 1 Cameron McInnes (70') 1 Jesse Ramien (72') 1 William Kennedy (74') 1	Nicho Hynes 3/5 (71', 73', 74')		
Team Details: FB / 1 / William Kennedy; WG / 2 / Sione Katoa; CE / 3 / Jesse Ramien; CE / 4 / Connor Tracey; WG / 5 / Ronaldo Mulitalo; FE / 6 / Braydon Trindall; HB / 7 / Nicho Hynes; PR / 8 / Oregon Kaufusi; HK / 9 / Blayke Brailey; PR / 10 / Toby Rudolf; SR / 11 / Briton Nikora; SR / 12 / Jesse Colquhoun; LK / 13 / Dale Finucane (c); Interchange: IC / 14 / Cameron McInnes; IC / 16 / Jack Williams; IC / 17 / Tom Hazelton; IC / 20 / Royce Hunt; Concussion Substitute: RE / 18 / Kayal Iro; Reserves: RE / 15 / Siosifa Talakai; RE / 19 / Mawene Hiroti; RE / 21 / Daniel Atkinson; RE / 22 / Tuku Hau Tapuha; Coach: / / Craig Fitzgibbon
29 July	22	Penrith Panthers	BlueBet Stadium, Penrith	Loss	0-28				
Team Details: FB / 1 / William Kennedy; WG / 2 / Sione Katoa; CE / 3 / Jesse Ramien; CE / 15 / Siosifa Talakai; WG / 4 / Connor Tracey; FE / 6 / Braydon Trindall; HB / 7 / Nicho Hynes; PR / 20 / Braden Hamlin-Uele; HK / 9 / Blayke Brailey; PR / 10 / Toby Rudolf; SR / 11 / Briton Nikora; SR / 12 / Wade Graham (c); LK / 13 / Cameron McInnes; Interchange: IC / 8 / Oregon Kaufusi; IC / 14 / Jack Williams; IC / 16 / Tom Hazelton; IC / 17 / Royce Hunt; Concussion Substitute: RE / 18 / Matt Moylan; Reserves: RE / 5 / Ronaldo Mulitalo; RE / 19 / Kayal Iro; RE / 21 / Daniel Atkinson; RE / 22 / Tuku Hau Tapuha; Coach: / / Craig Fitzgibbon
5 August	23	South Sydney Rabbitohs	Optus Stadium, Perth	Win	26-16	Braydon Trindall (44', 57') 2 Mawene Hiroti (17') 1 Sione Katoa (23') 1	Nicho Hynes 5/5 (18', 24', 32' pen, 45', 58')		
Team Details: FB / 1 / Connor Tracey; WG / 2 / Sione Katoa; CE / 3 / Jesse Ramien; CE / 4 / Siosifa Talakai; WG / 20 / Mawene Hiroti; FE / 6 / Braydon Trindall; HB / 7 / Nicho Hynes; PR / 8 / Braden Hamlin-Uele; HK / 9 / Blayke Brailey; PR / 10 / Toby Rudolf; SR / 11 / Briton Nikora; SR / 12 / Wade Graham (c); LK / 13 / Cameron McInnes; Interchange: IC / 14 / Jack Williams; IC / 15 / Tom Hazelton; IC / 16 / Royce Hunt; IC / 18 / Matt Moylan; Concussion Substitute: RE / 17 / Jesse Colquhoun; Reserves: RE / 5 / Ronaldo Mulitalo; RE / 19 / Kayal Iro; RE / 21 / Tuku Hau Tapuha; RE / 22 / Daniel Atkinson; Coach: / / Craig Fitzgibbon
11 August	24	Gold Coast Titans	PointsBet Stadium, Sydney	Win	36-6	Ronaldo Mulitalo (3', 30') 2 Connor Tracey (17') 1 Cameron McInnes (35') 1 Wade Graham (44') 1 Toby Rudolf (63') 1 Jesse Ramien (75') 1	Nicho Hynes 4/7 (18', 36', 46', 64')		
Team Details: FB / 1 / Connor Tracey; WG / 2 / Sione Katoa; CE / 3 / Jesse Ramien; CE / 4 / Siosifa Talakai; WG / 5 / Ronaldo Mulitalo; FE / 6 / Braydon Trindall; HB / 7 / Nicho Hynes; PR / 8 / Braden Hamlin-Uele; HK / 9 / Blayke Brailey; PR / 10 / Toby Rudolf; SR / 11 / Briton Nikora; SR / 12 / Wade Graham (c); LK / 13 / Cameron McInnes; Interchange: IC / 14 / Jack Williams; IC / 15 / Royce Hunt; IC / 16 / Jesse Colquhoun; IC / 17 / Matt Moylan; Concussion Substitute: RE / 19 / Tuku Hau Tapuha; Reserves: RE / 18 / Mawene Hiroti; RE / 20 / Daniel Atkinson; RE / 21 / Kayal Iro; RE / 22 / Jayden Berrell; Coach: / / Craig Fitzgibbon
17 August	25	North Queensland Cowboys	Queensland Country Bank Stadium, Townsville	Win	32-12	Ronaldo Mulitalo (17') 1 Tom Hazelton (30') 1 Royce Hunt (33') 1 Wade Graham (48') 1 Nicho Hynes (72') 1	Nicho Hynes 6/6 (19', 32', 35', 50', 66' pen, 73')		
Team Details: FB / 1 / Connor Tracey; WG / 2 / Sione Katoa; CE / 3 / Jesse Ramien; CE / 4 / Siosifa Talakai; WG / 5 / Ronaldo Mulitalo; FE / 6 / Braydon Trindall; HB / 7 / Nicho Hynes; PR / 8 / Braden Hamlin-Uele; HK / 9 / Blayke Brailey; PR / 10 / Toby Rudolf; SR / 11 / Briton Nikora; SR / 12 / Wade Graham (c); LK / 13 / Cameron McInnes; Interchange: IC / 14 / Jack Williams; IC / 15 / Royce Hunt; IC / 16 / Tom Hazelton; IC / 17 / Matt Moylan; Concussion Substitute: RE / 20 / Jesse Colquhoun; Reserves: RE / 18 / Mawene Hiroti; RE / 19 / Tuku Hau Tapuha; RE / 21 / Kayal Iro; RE / 22 / Jayden Berrell; Coach: / / Craig Fitzgibbon
27 August	26	Newcastle Knights	McDonald Jones Stadium, Newcastle	Loss	32-6	Connor Tracey (6') 1	Braydon Trindall 1/1 (17')		
Team Details: FB / 1 / Connor Tracey; WG / 2 / Sione Katoa; CE / 3 / Jesse Ramien; CE / 4 / Siosifa Talakai; WG / 5 / Ronaldo Mulitalo; FE / 17 / Matt Moylan; HB / 6 / Braydon Trindall; PR / 8 / Toby Rudolf; HK / 9 / Blayke Brailey; PR / 10 / Braden Hamlin-Uele; SR / 11 / Briton Nikora; SR / 12 / Wade Graham (c); LK / 13 / Cameron McInnes; Interchange: IC / 14 / Jack Williams; IC / 15 / Royce Hunt; IC / 16 / Tom Hazelton; IC / 18 / Jesse Colquhoun; Concussion Substitute: RE / 19 / Mawene Hiroti; Reserves: RE / 7 / Nicho Hynes; RE / 20 / Oregon Kaufusi; RE / 21 / Kayal Iro; RE / 22 / Jayden Berrell; Coach: / / Craig Fitzgibbon
3 September	27	Canberra Raiders	PointsBet Stadium, Sydney	Win	24-6	Jesse Ramien (15') 1 Jack Williams (52') 1 Braydon Trindall (60') 1 Ronaldo Mulitalo (63') 1 Sione Katoa (71') 1	Braydon Trindall 2/5 (54', 65')		
Team Details: FB / 1 / Connor Tracey; WG / 2 / Sione Katoa; CE / 3 / Jesse Ramien; CE / 4 / Siosifa Talakai; WG / 5 / Ronaldo Mulitalo; FE / 6 / Braydon Trindall; HB / 7 / Nicho Hynes; PR / 8 / Toby Rudolf; HK / 9 / Blayke Brailey; PR / 10 / Braden Hamlin-Uele; SR / 11 / Briton Nikora; SR / 12 / Wade Graham (c); LK / 13 / Cameron McInnes; Interchange: IC / 14 / Jack Williams; IC / 15 / Royce Hunt; IC / 16 / Tom Hazelton; IC / 20 / Oregon Kaufusi; Concussion Substitute: RE / 18 / Kayal Iro; Reserves: RE / 17 / Matt Moylan; RE / 19 / Mawene Hiroti; RE / 21 / Jesse Colquhoun; RE / 22 / Daniel Atkinson; Coach: / / Craig Fitzgibbon
Legend: Win Loss Draw Bye

=== Finals Series ===
Date	Round	Opponent	Venue	Result	Score	Tries	Goals	Field Goals	Report
9 September	Finals Week 1	Sydney Roosters	PointsBet Stadium, Sydney	Loss	13-12	Sione Katoa (14') 1 Ronaldo Mulitalo (52') 1	Nicho Hynes 2/4 (20' pen, 61' pen)		
Team Details: FB / 1 / Connor Tracey; WG / 2 / Sione Katoa; CE / 3 / Jesse Ramien; CE / 4 / Siosifa Talakai; WG / 5 / Ronaldo Mulitalo; FE / 6 / Braydon Trindall; HB / 7 / Nicho Hynes; PR / 8 / Toby Rudolf; HK / 9 / Blayke Brailey; PR / 15 / Royce Hunt; SR / 11 / Briton Nikora; SR / 12 / Wade Graham (c); LK / 13 / Cameron McInnes; Interchange: IC / 14 / Jack Williams; IC / 16 / Tom Hazelton; IC / 17 / Oregon Kaufusi; IC / 20 / Jesse Colquhoun; Concussion Substitute: RE / 18 / Kayal Iro; Reserves: RE / 10 / Braden Hamlin-Uele; RE / 19 / Daniel Atkinson; RE / 21 / William Kennedy; RE / 22 / Matt Moylan; Coach: / / Craig Fitzgibbon
Legend: Win Loss Draw Bye

== Ladder ==
2023 NRL season
Pos	Team	Pld	W	D	L	B	PF	PA	PD	Pts
1	Penrith Panthers (P)	24	18	0	6	3	645	312	+333	42
2	Brisbane Broncos	24	18	0	6	3	639	425	+214	42
3	Melbourne Storm	24	16	0	8	3	627	459	+168	38
4	New Zealand Warriors	24	16	0	8	3	572	448	+124	38
5	Newcastle Knights	24	14	1	9	3	626	451	+175	35
6	Cronulla-Sutherland Sharks	24	14	0	10	3	619	497	+122	34
7	Sydney Roosters	24	13	0	11	3	472	496	−24	32
8	Canberra Raiders	24	13	0	11	3	486	623	−137	32
9	South Sydney Rabbitohs	24	12	0	12	3	564	505	+59	30
10	Parramatta Eels	24	12	0	12	3	587	574	+13	30
11	North Queensland Cowboys	24	12	0	12	3	546	542	+4	30
12	Manly Warringah Sea Eagles	24	11	1	12	3	545	539	+6	29
13	Dolphins	24	9	0	15	3	520	631	−111	24
14	Gold Coast Titans	24	9	0	15	3	527	653	−126	24
15	Canterbury-Bankstown Bulldogs	24	7	0	17	3	438	769	−331	20
16	St. George Illawarra Dragons	24	5	0	19	3	474	673	−199	16
17	Wests Tigers	24	4	0	20	3	385	675	−290	14

=== Result by round ===
Round	1	2	3	4	5	6	7	8	9	10	11	12	13	14	15	16	17	18	19	20	21	22	23	24	25	26	27
Ground	H	A	A	A	H	–	H	A	H	N	A	H	–	H	A	H	–	H	A	A	H	A	A	H	A	A	H
Result	L	W	L	W	L	B	W	W	W	L	W	W	B	L	L	W	B	W	W	L	L	L	W	W	W	L	W
Position	14	10	12	6	12	11	6	5	2	4	4	3	2	4	5	5	4	3	3	6	6	7	6	5	5	6	6
Points	0	2	2	4	4	6	8	10	12	12	14	16	18	18	18	20	22	24	26	26	26	26	28	30	32	32	34

Updated to match(es) played on 6 July 2023. Source: National Rugby League
A = Away; H = Home; N = Neutral; B = Bye; W = Win; D = Draw; L = Loss

== Squad ==
No	Nat	Player	1st Position	2nd Position	Age	Height	Weight	NRL Games	Previous 1st Grade Club
1	(Australia)	William Kennedy	Fullback		26	183	88	62	None
2	(Tonga)	Sione Katoa	Wing		26	180	88	64	None
3	(Australia)	Jesse Ramien	Centre		26	184	98	97	Newcastle Knights
4	(Tonga)	Siosifa Talakai	Centre		26	178	100	63	South Sydney Rabbitohs
5	(New Zealand)	Ronaldo Mulitalo	Wing		24	190	95	64	None
6	(Australia)	Matt Moylan	Five-Eighth		32	185	90	171	Penrith Panthers
7	(Australia)	Braydon Trindall	Five-Eighth	Halfback	24	180	90	38	None
8	(Australia)	Toby Rudolf	Prop		27	190	106	66	None
9	(Australia)	Blayke Brailey	Hooker		25	180	86	85	None
10	(New Zealand)	Braden Hamlin-Uele	Prop		28	191	115	80	North Queensland Cowboys
11	(New Zealand)	Briton Nikora	Second Row		26	185	94	86	None
12	(Australia)	Teig Wilton	Second Row		24	186	98	45	None
13	(Australia)	Dale Finucane (c)	Lock		32	188	106	235	Melbourne Storm
14	(Australia)	Cameron McInnes	Lock	Prop	29	177	91	155	St. George Illawarra Dragons
15	(Australia)	Wade Graham (c)	Second Row		33	186	106	277	Penrith Panthers
16	(Samoa)	Oregon Kaufusi	Prop	Lock	24	188	114	72	Parramatta Eels
17	(New Zealand)	Jack Williams	Lock		27	184	98	75	None
18	(Samoa)	Royce Hunt	Prop	Lock	28	192	112	36	Canberra Raiders
19	(Australia)	Nicho Hynes	Halfback	Fullback	27	188	90	61	Melbourne Storm
20	(Australia)	Tom Hazelton	Prop		24	198	114	1	None
21	(Australia)	Connor Tracey	Centre	Fullback	27	183	87	56	South Sydney Rabbitohs
22	(Italy)	Daniel Atkinson; Development player	Five-Eighth	Fullback	22	185	89	1	Melbourne Storm
23	(Australia)	Jesse Colquhoun	Second Row	Prop	22	190	105	4	None
24	(New Zealand)	Mawene Hiroti	Wing	Centre	24	187	95	23	South Sydney Rabbitohs
	(Australia)	Jayden Berrell	Hooker		28	177	87	0	None
	(Australia)	Max Bradbury; Development player	Prop		20	???	??	0	None
	(Australia)	Kade Dykes	Fullback	Five-Eighth	21	???	??	2	None
	(Australia)	Josh Finau; Development player	Prop	Second Row	21	194	112	0	None
	(New Zealand)	Tuku Hau Tapuha; Mid-season gain	Prop		22	196	114	3	Sydney Roosters
	(Australia)	Matt Ikuvalu; Mid-season loss	Wing	Centre	30	184	100	43	Sydney Roosters
	(Cook Islands)	Kayal Iro; Development player	Centre	Wing	21	185	94	1	None
	(Australia)	Niwhai Puru; Development player	Halfback	Five-Eighth	21	178	91	0	None
	(Australia)	Sam Stonestreet	Wing	Centre	21	193	97	0	None
	(Greece)	Siteni Taukamo	Fullback	Wing	19	185	89	0	None

== Player movements ==
=== Recruited ===
Nat	Pos	Player	From	Date	Ref
(Samoa)	PR	Oregon Kaufusi	Parramatta Eels	December 2021	
(Australia)	FE	Niwhai Puru	Penrith Panthers	December 2022	
(Australia)	PR	Max Bradbury	Newcastle Knights	February 2023	
(Italy)	HB	Daniel Atkinson	Sunshine Coast Falcons	February 2023	
(New Zealand)	PR	Tuku Hau Tapuha	Sydney Roosters	March 2023; Mid-season transfer	

=== Released ===
Nat	Pos	Player	To	Date	Ref
(Australia)	FE	Luke Metcalf	New Zealand Warriors	November 2021	
(New Zealand)	PR	Franklin Pele	Canterbury-Bankstown Bulldogs	August 2022	
(Australia)	PR	Aiden Tolman	Retirement	August 2022	
(New Zealand)	C	Jensen Taumoepeau	Released	October 2022	
(Tonga)	PR	Andrew Fifita	Retirement	October 2022	
(Australia)	PR	Jack Martin	Wynnum Manly Seagulls	November 2022	
(Australia)	HB	Ryan Rivett	Newcastle Knights	December 2022	
(Australia)	FB	Lachlan Miller	Newcastle Knights	January 2023	
(New Zealand)	W	Jonaiah Lualua	Released	February 2023	Undisclosed
(Australia)	W	Matt Ikuvalu	Catalans Dragons	April 2023; Mid-season transfer	

== Player appearances ==
FB=Fullback	W=Winger	C=Centre	FE=Five-Eighth	HB=Halfback	PR=Prop	H=Hooker	SR=Second Row	L=Lock	B=Bench	R=Reserve

No	Player	1	2	3	4	5	6	7	8	9	10	11	12	13	14	15	16	17	18	19	20	21	22	23	24	25	26	27	F1
1	Jayden Berrell	H (NSW)	H (NSW)	H (NSW)	H (NSW)	H (NSW)	–	H (NSW)	H (NSW)	H (NSW)	H (NSW)	H (NSW)	H (NSW)	H (NSW)	–	H (NSW)	H (NSW)	H (NSW)	H (NSW)			H (NSW)	H (NSW)	H (NSW)	H (NSW)	H (NSW)	H (NSW)	–	–
2	Blayke Brailey	H	H	H	H	H	–	H	H	H	H	H	H	–	H	H	H	–	H	H	H	H	H	H	H	H	H	H	H
3	Jesse Colquhoun								PR (NSW)	PR (NSW)	PR (NSW)	PR (NSW)	–	PR (NSW)	–	PR (NSW)	PR (NSW)	SR (NSW)	SR (NSW)	B	B	SR	–	–	B	L (NSW)	B	–	B
4	Kade Dykes																												
5	Dale Finucane	L	L	L	L	L	–	Red card	Red card	Red card	B	L	L	–	L	L	L	–	L	Red card	Red card	L							
6	Wade Graham	B	Red card	Red card	Red card	Red card	–	B	B	B	B	B	B	–	B	B	B	–	B	B	B		SR	SR	SR	SR	SR	SR	SR
7	Braden Hamlin-Uele	PR	PR	PR	PR	PR	–	PR	PR	PR			B	–	B	PR	PR	–	PR				PR	PR	PR	PR	PR	PR	–
8	Tuku Hau Tapuha	On 17 March, Tuku Hau Tapuha signed a two-year deal with the club after being granted an immediate release from the Sydney Roosters.		B (NSW)	B (NSW)	B (NSW)	–	B (NSW)	PR (NSW)	PR (NSW)	B (NSW)	B (NSW)	PR (NSW)	PR (NSW)	–	PR (NSW)	–	PR (NSW)	PR (NSW)	B (NSW)	B (NSW)	B (NSW)	SR (NSW)	SR (NSW)	SR (NSW)	SR (NSW)	SR (NSW)	–	–
9	Tom Hazelton	R	R	R	PR (NSW)	PR (NSW)	–	B	B	B	B	B	B	–	B	–	B	–	B	B	B	B	B	B		B	B	B	B
10	Mawene Hiroti	R	FB (NSW)	FB (NSW)	R	C (NSW)	–	C (NSW)	C (NSW)	C (NSW)	C (NSW)	FB (NSW)	–	FB (NSW)	FB (NSW)	C (NSW)	FB (NSW)	C (NSW)	C (NSW)	FE (NSW)	C (NSW)	C (NSW)	C (NSW)	W	C (NSW)	FB (NSW)	–	–	–
11	Royce Hunt		B	B	B	B	–	B	B	B	PR	PR	PR	–	PR	PR						B	B	B	B	B	B	B	PR
12	Nicho Hynes				HB	HB	–	HB	HB	HB	HB	HB	HB	–	HB	HB	HB	–	HB	HB	HB	HB	HB	HB	HB	HB		HB	HB
13	Matt Ikuvalu							W (NSW)	On 20 April, Matt Ikuvalu was announced as an immediate signing for the Catalans Dragons of the Super League.																				
14	Sione Katoa	W	W	W	W	W	–	W	W	W	W	W	W	–	W	W	W	–	W	W	W	W	W	W	W	W	W	W	W
15	Oregon Kaufusi	B	B	B	B		–	PR	PR	PR	PR	–	PR	–	PR	B	PR	–	PR	PR	PR	PR	B			–	–	B	B
16	William Kennedy	FB	FB	FB	FB	FB	–	FB	FB	FB	FB	FB	FB	–	FB	FB	FB	–	FB	FB	FB	FB	FB						
16	Cameron McInnes	B	B	B	B	B	–	L	L	L	L	PR				B	B	–	B	L	L	B	L	L	L	L	L	L	L
17	Matt Moylan	FE	FE	FE	FE	FE	–	FE	FE	FE	FE	FE	FE	–	FE	FE	FE	–	FE	FE	FE	–	–	B	B	B	FE	–	–
18	Ronaldo Mulitalo	W	W	W	W	W	–	W	W	W	W	W	W	–	W	W	W	–	W	W	W	W	–	–	W	W	W	W	W
19	Briton Nikora	SR	SR	SR	SR	SR	–	SR	SR	SR	SR	SR	SR	–	SR	SR	SR	–	SR	SR	SR	SR	SR	SR	SR	SR	SR	SR	SR
20	Jesse Ramien	C	C	C	C	C	–	C	C	C	C	C	C	–	C	C	C	–	C	C	C	C	C	C	C	C	C	C	C
21	Toby Rudolf	PR	PR	PR	PR	PR													L (NSW)	PR	PR	PR	PR	PR	PR	PR	PR	PR	PR
22	Sam Stonestreet	W (NSW)	W (NSW)	W (NSW)	C (NSW)	R	–	W (NSW)	W (NSW)	W (NSW)	W (NSW)	C (NSW)	C (NSW)	W (NSW)	–	–	W (NSW)	W (NSW)	W (NSW)	W (NSW)							B (NSW)	W (JFC)	W (JFC)
23	Siosifa Talakai	C	C	C	C	C	–	C	C	C	C				C	C	C	–	C	C	C	–	C	C	C	C	C	C	C
24	Siteni Taukamo	–	–	–	FB (SGB)	FB (SGB)	–	R (JFC)	R (JFC)	W (JFC)	–	–	–	–	–	–	–	–	–	–	–	FB (JFC)	–	W (JFC)	FB (JFC)	FB (JFC)	FB (JFC)	FB (JFC)	FB (JFC)
25	Connor Tracey	FB (NSW)	B	R	FB (NSW)	FB (NSW)	–	FB (NSW)	FB (NSW)	FB (NSW)	–	C	C	–	–	FB (NSW)	–	FB (NSW)	FB (NSW)	FB (NSW)	–	C	W	FB	FB	FB	FB	FB	FB
26	Braydon Trindall	HB	HB	HB		B	–	HB (NSW)	R	R HB (NSW)	–	B	FE (NSW)	–	–	FE (NSW)	FE (NSW)	FE (NSW)	FE (NSW)	HB (NSW)	FE (NSW)	FE	FE	FE	FE	FE	HB	FE	FE
27	Jack Williams	B		B	B	B	–	B	B	B	B	B	B	–	B	B	B	–	B	B	B	B	B	B	B	B	B	B	B
28	Teig Wilton	SR	SR	SR	SR	SR	–	SR	SR	SR	SR	SR	SR	–	SR	SR	SR	–	SR	SR	SR								
Development Players
29	Daniel Atkinson	FE (NSW)	FE (NSW)	FE (NSW)	FE (NSW)	FE (NSW)	–	FE (NSW)	FE (NSW)	FE (NSW)	FE (NSW)	FE (NSW)	–	FE (NSW)	–	R					FB (NSW)	FE (NSW)	FE (NSW)	–	FB (NSW)	–	–	–	–
30	Max Bradbury	PR (NSW)	PR (JFC)	PR (JFC)	PR (JFC)	PR (JFC)	–	PR (JFC)	PR (JFC)	–	–	B (JFC)	PR (JFC)	B (JFC)	B (JFC)	B (JFC)	–	PR (JFC)	B (JFC)	–	–	–	–	–	–	–	–	B (JFC)	PR (JFC)
31	Josh Finau	PR (JFC)	–	–	–	R (JFC)	–	SR (JFC)	SR (JFC)	PR (JFC)	–	PR (JFC)	PR (JFC)	PR (JFC)	PR (JFC)	PR (JFC)	–	PR (JFC)	–	–	–	–	–	–	–	–	–	–	–
32	Kayal Iro	C (NSW)	C (NSW)	C (NSW)	R (NSW)	R (NSW)	–	C (NSW)	C (NSW)	C (NSW)	C (NSW)	–	–	C (NSW)	–	C (NSW)	C (NSW)	C (NSW)	–	C (NSW)	C (NSW)	–	C (NSW)	–	C (NSW)	C (NSW)	C (NSW)	–	–
33	Niwhai Puru	HB (NSW)	HB (NSW)	HB (NSW)	HB (NSW)	HB (NSW)	–	HB (JFC)	HB (NSW)	–	HB (NSW)	HB (NSW)	HB (NSW)	HB (NSW)	HB (JFC)	HB (NSW)	HB (NSW)	HB (NSW)	HB (NSW)	–	HB (NSW)	HB (NSW)	HB (NSW)	HB (NSW)	HB (NSW)	HB (NSW)	HB (NSW)	–	–

== Representative honours ==
Pos.	Player	Team	Call-up	References
First Grade
RE	Blayke Brailey	New South Wales Origin	2023 State of Origin Game I	
PR	Royce Hunt	(Māori people) Maori All Stars	2023 All Stars Match	
PR	Royce Hunt	Samoa	2023 Rugby League Pacific Championships	
HB	Nicho Hynes	Indigenous All Stars	2023 All Stars Match	
BE	Nicho Hynes	New South Wales Origin	2023 State of Origin Game I	
BE	Nicho Hynes	Australian XIII	2023 Prime Minister's XIII	
RE / BE	Nicho Hynes	Australia	2023 Rugby League Pacific Championships	
CE	Kayal Iro	Cook Islands	2023 Rugby League Pacific Championships	
BE	Cameron McInnes	Australian XIII	2023 Prime Minister's XIII	
WG	Ronaldo Mulitalo	New Zealand	2023 Rugby League Pacific Championships	
SR	Briton Nikora	(Māori people) Maori All Stars	2023 All Stars Match	
SR	Briton Nikora	New Zealand	2023 Rugby League Pacific Championships	
BE	Braydon Trindall	Indigenous All Stars	2023 All Stars Match	
Women's
HK	Brooke Anderson	(Māori people) Maori All Stars	2023 All Stars Match	
LK	Brooke Anderson	New South Wales Women	2023 Women's State of Origin Game I	
RE	Brooke Anderson	New South Wales Women	2023 Women's State of Origin Game II	
HK	Quincy Dodd	Indigenous All Stars	2023 All Stars Match	
BE	Quincy Dodd	New South Wales Women	2023 Women's State of Origin Game I	
BE	Quincy Dodd	New South Wales Women	2023 Women's State of Origin Game II	
BE	Quincy Dodd	Australian XIII	2023 Prime Minister's XIII	
WG	Zali Fay	(Māori people) Maori All Stars	2023 All Stars Match	
RE	Ellie Johnston	New South Wales Women	2023 Women's State of Origin Game I	
RE	Tiana Penitani	New South Wales Women	2023 Women's State of Origin Game I	
WG	Tiana Penitani	New South Wales Women	2023 Women's State of Origin Game II	
FB	Emma Tonegato	New South Wales Women	2023 Women's State of Origin Game I	
FB	Emma Tonegato	New South Wales Women	2023 Women's State of Origin Game II	

== Squad statistics ==
Name	Start	Int	T	G	FG	Pts
Daniel Atkinson	0	1	0	0	0	0
Jayden Berrell	0	0	0	0	0	0
Blayke Brailey	25	0	1	0	0	4
Jesse Colquhoun	1	5	0	0	0	0
Kade Dykes	0	0	0	0	0	0
Dale Finucane	12	1	0	0	0	0
Wade Graham	7	13	2	0	0	8
Braden Hamlin-Uele	17	2	1	0	0	4
Tom Hazelton	0	18	3	0	0	12
Mawene Hiroti	1	0	1	0	0	4
Royce Hunt	6	14	3	0	0	12
Nicho Hynes	21	0	5	83	1	187
Sione Katoa	25	0	13	0	0	52
Oregon Kaufusi	11	8	0	0	0	0
William Kennedy	19	0	14	0	0	56
Cameron McInnes	14	9	3	0	0	12
Matt Moylan	18	2	2	0	0	8
Ronaldo Mulitalo	23	0	21	0	0	84
Briton Nikora	25	0	8	0	0	32
Jesse Ramien	25	0	11	0	0	44
Toby Rudolf	15	0	1	0	0	4
Sam Stonestreet	0	0	0	0	0	0
Siosifa Talakai	22	0	5	1	0	22
Siteni Taukamo	0	0	0	0	0	0
Connor Tracey	10	0	3	0	0	12
Braydon Trindall	11	2	4	13	0	42
Jack Williams	0	24	2	0	0	8
Teig Wilton	17	0	6	0	0	24
24 Players used	—	—	109	97	1	619

== NSWRL Major Comps ==
=== Knock-On Effect NSW Cup (Newtown Jets) ===
==== Pre-season ====
Date	Round	Opponent	Venue	Result	Score	Tries	Goals	Field Goals	Report
11 February	Trial Match	Blacktown Workers Sea Eagles	HE Laybutt Field, Sydney	Win	32-16	Maile Haumono (19', 66') 2 Wesley Lolo (4') 1 Johnny-Lee Gabrael (12') 1 Kai Parker 1 Harrison Geraghty 1 Connor Garrety 1			
Team Details: FB / 1 / Wyatt Rangi; WG / 2 / Marco Talagi; CE / 3 / Trentham Petersen; CE / 4 / Kyle Pickering; WG / 5 / Maile Haumono; FE / 6 / Harrison Geraghty; HB / 7 / Johnny-Lee Gabrael; PR / 8 / Wesley Lolo; HK / 9 / Isaac Longmuir; PR / 10 / Rhys Dakin; SR / 11 / Charbel Tasipale; SR / 12 / Jordin Leiu; LK / 13 / Billy Magoulias (c); Interchange: IC / 6 / Toroa Rapana; IC / 9 / Kobie Wilson; IC / 14 / Jackson Stewart; IC / 15 / Adam Fearnley; IC / 17 / Toataua Porima; IC / 19 / Connor Garrety; IC / 22 / Kai Parker; Coach: / / George Ndaira
19 February	Trial Match	Canterbury-Bankstown Bulldogs	Belmore Sports Ground, Sydney	Win	42-32	Niwhai Puru (33', 48') 2 Charbel Tasipale (6') 1 Kayal Iro (19') 1 Tom Rodwell (23') 1 Billy Magoulias (30') 1 Johnny-Lee Gabrael (37') 1	Niwhai Puru 6/8 (8', 31', 35' 38', 40' pen, 49')		
Team Details: FB / 1 / Trentham Petersen; WG / 2 / Tom Rodwell; CE / 3 / Kyle Pickering; CE / 4 / Kayal Iro; WG / 5 / Sam Stonestreet; FE / 6 / Johnny-Lee Gabrael; HB / 7 / Niwhai Puru; PR / 8 / Tom Hazelton; HK / 9 / Jayden Berrell; PR / 14 / Rhys Dakin; SR / 11 / Jordin Leiu; SR / 12 / Charbel Tasipale; LK / 13 / Billy Magoulias (c); Interchange: IC / 2 / Josh Mansour; IC / 5 / Connor Garrety; IC / 13 / Marco Talagi; IC / 15 / Adam Fearnley; IC / 16 / Josh Finau; IC / 18 / Sam Healey; IC / 19 / Blake Hosking; IC / 20 / Max Bradbury; IC / 22 / Kai Parker; IC / 25 / Wyatt Rangi; IC / 26 / Isaac Longmuir; Reserves: RE / 1 / Daniel Atkinson; RE / 7 / Harrison Geraghty; RE / 10 / Jesse Colquhoun; Coach: / / George Ndaira
Legend: Win Loss Draw Bye

==== Regular season ====
Date	Round	Opponent	Venue	Result	Score	Tries	Goals	Field Goals	Report
4 March	1	South Sydney Rabbitohs	Henson Park, Sydney	Win	26-6	Kayal Iro (21', 74') 2 Charbel Tasipale (24') 1 Josh Mansour (55') 1 Jacob Gagan (77') 1	Niwhai Puru 3/6 (25', 40' pen, 76')		
Team Details: FB / 1 / Connor Tracey; WG / 2 / Josh Mansour; CE / 3 / Jacob Gagan; CE / 4 / Kayal Iro; WG / 5 / Sam Stonestreet; FE / 6 / Daniel Atkinson; HB / 7 / Niwhai Puru; PR / 8 / Max Bradbury; HK / 9 / Jayden Berrell; PR / 10 / Rhys Dakin; SR / 11 / Jordin Leiu; SR / 12 / Charbel Tasipale; LK / 13 / Billy Magoulias (c); Interchange: IC / 14 / Tyler Slade; IC / 15 / Brad Fearnley; IC / 17 / Wesley Lolo; IC / 19 / Kyle Pickering; Concussion Substitute: RE / 18 / Tom Rodwell; Reserves: RE / 1 / Trentham Petersen; RE / 18 / Johnny-Lee Gabrael; RE / 25 / Kai Parker; RE / 26 / Isaac Longmuir; Coach: / / George Ndaira
10 March	2	Parramatta Eels	CommBank Stadium, Sydney	Win	42-12	Sam Stonestreet (18', 71', 77') 3 Caleb Hamlin-Uele (8') 1 Jayden Berrell (12') 1 Charbel Tasipale (54') 1 Josh Mansour (65') 1	Mawene Hiroti 7/7 (10', 14', 20', 56', 67', 73', 79')		
Team Details: FB / 25 / Mawene Hiroti; WG / 2 / Josh Mansour; CE / 3 / Jacob Gagan; CE / 4 / Kayal Iro; WG / 1 / Sam Stonestreet; FE / 6 / Daniel Atkinson; HB / 7 / Niwhai Puru; PR / 8 / Caleb Hamlin-Uele; HK / 9 / Jayden Berrell; PR / 10 / Rhys Dakin; SR / 11 / Jordin Leiu; SR / 12 / Charbel Tasipale; LK / 13 / Billy Magoulias (c); Interchange: IC / 15 / Brad Fearnley; IC / 17 / Wesley Lolo; IC / 19 / Kyle Pickering; IC / 22 / Tyler Slade; Concussion Substitute: RE / 5 / Tom Rodwell; Reserves: RE / 22 / Trentham Petersen; Coach: / / George Ndaira
19 March	3	Canberra Raiders	GIO Stadium, Canberra	Loss	20-28	Mawene Hiroti (5', 45') 2 Sam Stonestreet (9') 1 Daniel Atkinson (65') 1	Mawene Hiroti 2/4 (25', 47')		
Team Details: FB / 1 / Mawene Hiroti; WG / 2 / Josh Mansour; CE / 3 / Jacob Gagan; CE / 4 / Kayal Iro; WG / 5 / Sam Stonestreet; FE / 6 / Daniel Atkinson; HB / 7 / Niwhai Puru; PR / 8 / Caleb Hamlin-Uele; HK / 9 / Jayden Berrell; PR / 10 / Rhys Dakin; SR / 11 / Jordin Leiu; SR / 12 / Charbel Tasipale; LK / 13 / Billy Magoulias (c); Interchange: IC / 15 / Tyler Slade; IC / 19 / Brad Fearnley; IC / 22 / Kyle Pickering; IC / 25 / Kai Parker; Concussion Substitute: RE / 26 / Tom Rodwell; Coach: / / George Ndaira
26 March	4	St. George Illawarra Dragons	Netstrata Jubilee Stadium, Sydney	Win	30-16	Tom Hazelton (13', 64') 2 Daniel Atkinson (53', 74') 2 Tom Rodwell (17') 1	Niwhai Puru 5/6 (15', 25' pen, 55', 66', 74')		
Team Details: FB / 1 / Connor Tracey; WG / 2 / Josh Mansour; CE / 3 / Jacob Gagan; CE / 5 / Sam Stonestreet; WG / 26 / Tom Rodwell; FE / 6 / Daniel Atkinson; HB / 7 / Niwhai Puru; PR / 14 / Tom Hazelton; HK / 9 / Jayden Berrell; PR / 10 / Rhys Dakin; SR / 11 / Jordin Leiu; SR / 12 / Charbel Tasipale; LK / 13 / Billy Magoulias (c); Interchange: PR / 8 / Caleb Hamlin-Uele; IC / 15 / Tyler Slade; IC / 17 / Tuku Hau Tapuha; IC / 22 / Kyle Pickering; Concussion Substitute: RE / 19 / Brad Fearnley; Reserves: RE / 4 / Kayal Iro; Coach: / / George Ndaira
1 April	5	Canterbury-Bankstown Bulldogs	Henson Park, Sydney	Loss	6-16	Jacob Gagan (74') 1	Niwhai Puru 1/1 (75')		
Team Details: FB / 1 / Connor Tracey; WG / 2 / Josh Mansour; CE / 3 / Jacob Gagan; CE / 4 / Mawene Hiroti; WG / 18 / Tom Rodwell; FE / 6 / Daniel Atkinson; HB / 7 / Niwhai Puru; PR / 14 / Tom Hazelton; HK / 9 / Jayden Berrell; PR / 10 / Rhys Dakin; SR / 11 / Jordin Leiu; SR / 25 / Kai Parker; LK / 13 / Billy Magoulias (c); Interchange: IC / 8 / Caleb Hamlin-Uele; IC / 15 / Tyler Slade; IC / 17 / Tuku Hau Tapuha; IC / 19 / Brad Fearnley; Concussion Substitute: RE / 26 / Johnny-Lee Gabrael; Reserves: RE / 4 / Kayal Iro; RE / 5 / Sam Stonestreet; RE / 12 / Charbel Tasipale; RE / 22 / Kyle Pickering; Coach: / / George Ndaira
	6	Bye							
15 April	7	Sydney Roosters	Henson Park, Sydney	Win	40-18	Charbel Tasipale (6', 28') 2 Sam Stonestreet (10') 1 Matt Ikuvalu (35') 1 Brad Fearnley (38') 1 Jacob Gagan (55') 1 Daniel Atkinson (76') 1	Mawene Hiroti 6/7 (8', 12', 29', 39', 57', 76')		
Team Details: FB / 18 / Connor Tracey; WG / 2 / Matt Ikuvalu; CE / 1 / Mawene Hiroti; CE / 4 / Kayal Iro; WG / 5 / Sam Stonestreet; FE / 6 / Daniel Atkinson; HB / 7 / Braydon Trindall; PR / 8 / Caleb Hamlin-Uele; HK / 9 / Jayden Berrell; PR / 10 / Rhys Dakin; SR / 11 / Jordin Leiu; SR / 12 / Charbel Tasipale; LK / 13 / Billy Magoulias (c); Interchange: IC / 3 / Jacob Gagan; IC / 15 / Tyler Slade; IC / 17 / Tuku Hau Tapuha; IC / 19 / Brad Fearnley; Concussion Substitute: RE / 22 / Kyle Pickering; Reserves: RE / 7 / Niwhai Puru; RE / 18 / Josh Mansour; Coach: / / George Ndaira
22 April	8	Canterbury-Bankstown Bulldogs	Accor Stadium, Sydney	Win	28-10	Connor Tracey (36', 45') 2 Kayal Iro (50') 1 Daniel Atkinson (72') 1 Josh Mansour (78') 1	Mawene Hiroti 4/6 (38', 47', 52', 74')		
Team Details: FB / 1 / Connor Tracey; WG / 2 / Josh Mansour; CE / 3 / Mawene Hiroti; CE / 4 / Kayal Iro; WG / 5 / Sam Stonestreet; FE / 6 / Daniel Atkinson; HB / 7 / Niwhai Puru; PR / 21 / Tuku Hau Tapuha; HK / 9 / Jayden Berrell; PR / 10 / Jesse Colquhoun; SR / 11 / Jacob Gagan; SR / 12 / Charbel Tasipale; LK / 13 / Billy Magoulias (c); Interchange: IC / 15 / Tyler Slade; IC / 17 / Caleb Hamlin-Uele; IC / 19 / Kyle Pickering; IC / 22 / Brad Fearnley; Concussion Substitute: RE / 18 / Harrison Geraghty; Reserves: RE / 8 / Rhys Dakin; Coach: / / George Ndaira
29 April	9	North Sydney Bears	Henson Park, Sydney	Loss	28-29	Billy Magoulias (6') 1 Connor Tracey (14') 1 Jacob Gagan (20') 1 Daniel Atkinson (39') 1 Kayal Iro (73') 1	Mawene Hiroti 4/5 (8', 15', 22', 73')		
Team Details: FB / 1 / Connor Tracey; WG / 2 / Josh Mansour; CE / 3 / Mawene Hiroti; CE / 4 / Kayal Iro; WG / 5 / Sam Stonestreet; FE / 6 / Daniel Atkinson; HB / 7 / Braydon Trindall; PR / 21 / Tuku Hau Tapuha; HK / 9 / Jayden Berrell; PR / 10 / Jesse Colquhoun; SR / 11 / Jacob Gagan; SR / 25 / Jordin Leiu; LK / 13 / Billy Magoulias (c); Interchange: IC / 12 / Charbel Tasipale; IC / 15 / Tyler Slade; IC / 17 / Caleb Hamlin-Uele; IC / 22 / Brad Fearnley; Concussion Substitute: RE / 19 / Kyle Pickering; Reserves: RE / 7 / Niwhai Puru; RE / 8 / Rhys Dakin; Coach: / / George Ndaira
7 May	10	Penrith Panthers	HE Laybutt Field, Sydney (Note: Match was originally set to take place at Redfern Oval, Sydney.)	Win	29-16	Daniel Atkinson (26', 38') 2 Sam Stonestreet (51', 59') 2 Kayal Iro (72') 1	Mawene Hiroti 4/5 (27', 38', 53', 61')	Niwhai Puru 1 (79')	
Team Details: FB / 1 / Mawene Hiroti; WG / 2 / Josh Mansour; CE / 3 / Jensen Taumoepeau; CE / 4 / Kayal Iro; WG / 5 / Sam Stonestreet; FE / 6 / Daniel Atkinson; HB / 7 / Niwhai Puru; PR / 8 / Rhys Dakin; HK / 9 / Jayden Berrell; PR / 10 / Jesse Colquhoun; SR / 11 / Jordin Leiu; SR / 19 / Kyle Pickering; LK / 13 / Billy Magoulias (c); Interchange: IC / 12 / Charbel Tasipale; IC / 15 / Tyler Slade; IC / 21 / Tuku Hau Tapuha; IC / 22 / Brad Fearnley; Concussion Substitute: RE / 18 / Tom Rodwell; Reserves: RE / 3 / Jacob Gagan; RE / 17 / Caleb Hamlin-Uele; Coach: / / George Ndaira
14 May	11	Blacktown Workers Sea Eagles	4 Pines Park, Sydney	Draw	22-22	Sam Stonestreet (1') 1 Josh Mansour (5') 1 Niwhai Puru (7') 1 Brad Fearnley (26') 1	Mawene Hiroti 3/4 (6', 9', 27')		
Team Details: FB / 1 / Manaia Waitere; WG / 2 / Josh Mansour; CE / 3 / Mawene Hiroti; CE / 5 / Sam Stonestreet; WG / 18 / Tom Rodwell; FE / 6 / Daniel Atkinson; HB / 7 / Niwhai Puru; PR / 8 / Rhys Dakin; HK / 9 / Jayden Berrell; PR / 10 / Jesse Colquhoun; SR / 11 / Jordin Leiu; SR / 12 / Charbel Tasipale; LK / 13 / Billy Magoulias (c); Interchange: IC / 15 / Tyler Slade; IC / 19 / Kyle Pickering; IC / 21 / Tuku Hau Tapuha; IC / 22 / Brad Fearnley; Concussion Substitute: RE / 17 / Caleb Hamlin-Uele; Reserves: RE / 1 / Connor Tracey; RE / 4 / Kayal Iro; Coach: / / George Ndaira
20 May	12	Newcastle Knights	Henson Park, Sydney	Win	40-12	Josh Mansour (33', 52') 2 Tom Rodwell (8') 1 Tuku Hau Tapuha (19') 1 Jensen Taumoepeau (30') 1 Charbel Tasipale (42') 1 Braydon Trindall (76') 1	Mawene Hiroti 6/7 (21', 31', 35', 44', 54', 77')		
Team Details: FB / 1 / Mawene Hiroti; WG / 2 / Josh Mansour; CE / 3 / Jensen Taumoepeau; CE / 4 / Sam Stonestreet; WG / 5 / Tom Rodwell; FE / 6 / Braydon Trindall; HB / 7 / Niwhai Puru; PR / 8 / Rhys Dakin; HK / 9 / Jayden Berrell; PR / 21 / Tuku Hau Tapuha; SR / 11 / Jordin Leiu; SR / 12 / Charbel Tasipale; LK / 13 / Billy Magoulias (c); Interchange: IC / 15 / Tyler Slade; IC / 17 / Caleb Hamlin-Uele; IC / 19 / Kyle Pickering; IC / 22 / Brad Fearnley; Concussion Substitute: RE / 26 / Harrison Geraghty; Reserves: RE / 6 / Johnny-Lee Gabrael; RE / 10 / Jesse Colquhoun; Coach: / / George Ndaira
28 May	13	Sydney Roosters	Wentworth Park, Sydney	Loss	23-24	Mawene Hiroti (26', 36') 2 Sam Stonestreet (13') 1 Rhys Dakin (43') 1	Mawene Hiroti 3/5 (14', 34' pen, 45')	Niwhai Puru 1/1 (39')	
Team Details: FB / 1 / Mawene Hiroti; WG / 2 / Josh Mansour; CE / 3 / Jensen Taumoepeau; CE / 4 / Sam Stonestreet; WG / 5 / Tom Rodwell; FE / 6 / Daniel Atkinson; HB / 7 / Niwhai Puru; PR / 21 / Tuku Hau Tapuha; HK / 9 / Jayden Berrell; PR / 10 / Jesse Colquhoun; SR / 11 / Jordin Leiu; SR / 12 / Charbel Tasipale; LK / 13 / Billy Magoulias (c); Interchange: IC / 8 / Rhys Dakin; IC / 15 / Tyler Slade; IC / 17 / Caleb Hamlin-Uele; IC / 19 / Kyle Pickering; Concussion Substitute: RE / 18 / Tom Rodwell; Reserves: RE / 22 / Brad Fearnley; Coach: / / George Ndaira
3 June	14	Bye							
11 June	15	North Sydney Bears	North Sydney Oval, Sydney	Win	36-20	Josh Mansour (22', 72', 79') 3 Connor Tracey (2', 68') 2 Charbel Tasipale (18') 1 Braydon Trindall (25') 1	Braydon Trindall 4/4 (26', 69', 73', 79'); Mawene Hiroti 0/3		
Team Details: FB / 1 / Connor Tracey; WG / 2 / Josh Mansour; CE / 3 / Mawene Hiroti; CE / 4 / Kayal Iro; WG / 5 / Tom Rodwell; FE / 6 / Braydon Trindall; HB / 7 / Niwhai Puru; PR / 8 / Tuku Hau Tapuha; HK / 9 / Jayden Berrell; PR / 10 / Jesse Colquhoun; SR / 11 / Jordin Leiu; SR / 12 / Charbel Tasipale; LK / 13 / Billy Magoulias (c); Interchange: IC / 15 / Kyle Pickering; IC / 17 / Caleb Hamlin-Uele; IC / 18 / Sam Healey; IC / 19 / Brad Fearnley; Concussion Substitute: RE / 25 / Jensen Taumoepeau; Reserves: RE / 5 / Sam Stonestreet; RE / 6 / Daniel Atkinson; RE / 8 / Rhys Dakin; RE / 15 / Tyler Slade; Coach: / / George Ndaira
17 June	16	New Zealand Warriors	Henson Park, Sydney	Win	24-16	Braydon Trindall (10', 72') 2 Kayal Iro (15') 1 Charbel Tasipale (49') 1	Mawene Hiroti 4/5 (12', 40' pen, 50', 72')		
Team Details: FB / 1 / Mawene Hiroti; WG / 2 / Josh Mansour; CE / 3 / Jensen Taumoepeau; CE / 4 / Kayal Iro; WG / 5 / Sam Stonestreet; FE / 6 / Braydon Trindall; HB / 7 / Niwhai Puru; PR / 8 / Rhys Dakin; HK / 9 / Jayden Berrell; PR / 10 / Jesse Colquhoun; SR / 11 / Jordin Leiu; SR / 12 / Charbel Tasipale; LK / 13 / Billy Magoulias (c); Interchange: IC / 15 / Kyle Pickering; IC / 17 / Caleb Hamlin-Uele; IC / 18 / Sam Healey; IC / 19 / Brad Fearnley; Concussion Substitute: RE / 26 / Tom Rodwell; Reserves: RE / 1 / Daniel Atkinson; RE / 8 / Tuku Hau Tapuha; Coach: / / George Ndaira
24 June	17	Parramatta Eels	Henson Park, Sydney	Win	40-22	Jayden Berrell (7') 1 Braydon Trindall (11') 1 Billy Magoulias (15') 1 Sam Stonestreet (20') 1 Jesse Colquhoun (38') 1 Sam Healey (57') 1 Connor Tracey (74') 1	Mawene Hiroti 6/7 (9', 12', 16', 22', 58', 76')		
Team Details: FB / 1 / Connor Tracey; WG / 2 / Josh Mansour; CE / 3 / Mawene Hiroti; CE / 4 / Kayal Iro; WG / 5 / Sam Stonestreet; FE / 6 / Braydon Trindall; HB / 7 / Niwhai Puru; PR / 8 / Kurt Dillon; HK / 9 / Jayden Berrell; PR / 21 / Tuku Hau Tapuha; SR / 10 / Jesse Colquhoun; SR / 12 / Charbel Tasipale; LK / 13 / Billy Magoulias (c); Interchange: IC / 15 / Kyle Pickering; IC / 17 / Caleb Hamlin-Uele; IC / 18 / Sam Healey; IC / 19 / Brad Fearnley; Concussion Substitute: RE / 22 / Trentham Petersen; Reserves: RE / 8 / Rhys Dakin; RE / 11 / Jacob Gagan; RE / 26 / Tom Rodwell; Coach: / / George Ndaira
1 July	18	St. George Illawarra Dragons	Henson Park, Sydney	Loss	12-46	Josh Mansour (20', 65', 72') 3	Mawene Hiroti 0/2; Braydon Trindall 0/1		
Team Details: FB / 1 / Connor Tracey; WG / 2 / Josh Mansour; CE / 3 / Jensen Taumoepeau; CE / 4 / Mawene Hiroti; WG / 5 / Sam Stonestreet; FE / 6 / Braydon Trindall; HB / 7 / Niwhai Puru; PR / 8 / Kurt Dillon; HK / 9 / Jayden Berrell (c); PR / 10 / Tuku Hau Tapuha; SR / 11 / Jesse Colquhoun; SR / 12 / Charbel Tasipale; LK / 23 / Toby Rudolf; Interchange: IC / 15 / Henry O'Kane; IC / 17 / Caleb Hamlin-Uele; IC / 18 / Sam Healey; IC / 19 / Brad Fearnley; Concussion Substitute: RE / 14 / Rhys Dakin; Reserves: RE / 4 / Kayal Iro; RE / 6 / Johnny-Lee Gabrael; RE / 13 / Billy Magoulias (c); RE / 15 / Kyle Pickering; RE / 22 / Tyler Slade; Coach: / / George Ndaira
8 July	19	Western Suburbs Magpies	Henson Park, Sydney	Loss	22-24	Sam Stonestreet (24') 1 Kyle Pickering (28') 1 Connor Tracey (46') 1 Sam Healey (58') 1	Mawene Hiroti 3/4 (29', 47', 59')		
Team Details: FB / 1 / Connor Tracey; WG / 2 / Josh Mansour; CE / 3 / Jensen Taumoepeau; CE / 4 / Kayal Iro; WG / 5 / Sam Stonestreet; FE / 6 / Mawene Hiroti; HB / 7 / Braydon Trindall (c); PR / 17 / Caleb Hamlin-Uele; HK / 19 / Tyler Slade; PR / 10 / Rhys Dakin; SR / 11 / Kyle Pickering; SR / 12 / Charbel Tasipale; LK / 13 / Blake Hosking; Interchange: IC / 8 / Kurt Dillon; IC / 9 / Sam Healey; IC / 15 / Brad Fearnley; IC / 21 / Tuku Hau Tapuha; Concussion Substitute: RE / 22 / Trentham Petersen; Reserves: RE / 6 / Johnny-Lee Gabrael; RE / 7 / Niwhai Puru; RE / 9 / Jayden Berrell (c); Coach: / / George Ndaira
16 July	20	New Zealand Warriors	Go Media Stadium, Auckland	Win	26-18	Tom Rodwell (59', 66') 2 Daniel Atkinson (2') 1 Caleb Hamlin-Uele (16') 1 Sam Healey (52') 1	Mawene Hiroti 3/6 (18', 47' pen, 68')		
Team Details: FB / 1 / Daniel Atkinson; WG / 2 / Jensen Taumoepeau; CE / 3 / Mawene Hiroti; CE / 4 / Kayal Iro; WG / 5 / Tom Rodwell; FE / 6 / Braydon Trindall (c); HB / 7 / Niwhai Puru; PR / 8 / Caleb Hamlin-Uele; HK / 9 / Sam Healey; PR / 10 / Rhys Dakin; SR / 11 / Kyle Pickering; SR / 12 / Charbel Tasipale; LK / 19 / Brad Fearnley; Interchange: IC / 14 / Kurt Dillon; IC / 15 / Blake Hosking; IC / 17 / Tuku Hau Tapuha; IC / 22 / Trentham Petersen; Concussion Substitute: RE / 25 / Kai Parker; Reserves: RE / 2 / Josh Mansour; RE / 4 / Trentham Petersen; RE / 13 / Blake Hosking; RE / 19 / Tyler Slade; Coach: / / George Ndaira
22 July	21	Manly Sea Eagles	Henson Park, Sydney	Loss	12-28	Kyle Pickering (9', 63') 2	Mawene Hiroti 2/2 (11', 64')		
Team Details: FB / 1 / Manaia Waitere; WG / 2 / Jensen Taumoepeau; CE / 3 / Mawene Hiroti; CE / 4 / Trentham Petersen; WG / 5 / Tom Rodwell; FE / 6 / Daniel Atkinson; HB / 7 / Niwhai Puru; PR / 8 / Caleb Hamlin-Uele; HK / 9 / Jayden Berrell (c); PR / 10 / Rhys Dakin; SR / 11 / Kyle Pickering; SR / 12 / Charbel Tasipale; LK / 15 / Brad Fearnley; Interchange: IC / 13 / Blake Hosking; IC / 14 / Kurt Dillon; IC / 17 / Tuku Hau Tapuha; IC / 18 / Sam Healey; Concussion Substitute: RE / 21 / Wesley Lolo; Reserves: RE / 3 / Kai Parker; RE / 22 / Tyler Slade; Coach: / / George Ndaira
29 July	22	Penrith Panthers	BlueBet Stadium, Penrith	Loss	6-30	Sam Healey (60') 1	Mawene Hiroti 1/1 (61')		
Team Details: FB / 1 / Manaia Waitere; WG / 2 / Jensen Taumoepeau; CE / 3 / Mawene Hiroti; CE / 4 / Kayal Iro; WG / 5 / Trentham Petersen; FE / 6 / Daniel Atkinson; HB / 7 / Niwhai Puru; PR / 14 / Kurt Dillon; HK / 9 / Jayden Berrell (c); PR / 10 / Rhys Dakin; SR / 11 / Tuku Hau Tapuha; SR / 12 / Kyle Pickering; LK / 15 / Blake Hosking; Interchange: IC / 8 / Caleb Hamlin-Uele; IC / 13 / Brad Fearnley; IC / 18 / Sam Healey; IC / 22 / Kai Parker; Concussion Substitute: RE / 25 / Toby Boothroyd; Reserves: RE / 5 / Tom Rodwell; RE / 17 / Wesley Lolo; Coach: / / George Ndaira
5 August	23	South Sydney Rabbitohs	Redfern Oval, Sydney	Loss	16-32	Jayden Berrell (15', 26') 2 Manaia Waitere (47') 1	Niwhai Puru 2/3 (27', 49')		
Team Details: FB / 1 / Manaia Waitere; WG / 2 / Trentham Petersen; CE / 3 / Jensen Taumoepeau; CE / 26 / Chris Vea'ila; WG / 5 / Tom Rodwell; FE / 6 / Johnny-Lee Gabrael; HB / 7 / Niwhai Puru; PR / 8 / Kurt Dillon; HK / 9 / Jayden Berrell (c); PR / 10 / Rhys Dakin; SR / 11 / Tuku Hau Tapuha; SR / 4 / Kyle Pickering; LK / 13 / Blake Hosking; Interchange: IC / 12 / Brad Fearnley; IC / 14 / Addison Demetriou; IC / 17 / Caleb Hamlin-Uele; IC / 18 / Sam Healey; Concussion Substitute: RE / 15 / Tyler Slade; Reserves: RE / 4 / Kyle Pickering; RE / 19 / Kai Parker; RE / 21 / Wesley Lolo; Coach: / / George Ndaira
12 August	24	Canberra Raiders	Henson Park, Sydney	Loss	12-36	Kyle Pickering (10') 1 Caleb Hamlin-Uele (54') 1	Mawene Hiroti 2/2 (12', 55')		
Team Details: FB / 1 / Daniel Atkinson; WG / 2 / Jensen Taumoepeau; CE / 3 / Mawene Hiroti; CE / 4 / Kayal Iro; WG / 5 / Tom Rodwell; FE / 6 / Johnny-Lee Gabrael; HB / 7 / Niwhai Puru; PR / 8 / Kurt Dillon; HK / 9 / Jayden Berrell (c); PR / 10 / Rhys Dakin; SR / 11 / Tuku Hau Tapuha; SR / 12 / Kyle Pickering; LK / 13 / Blake Hosking; Interchange: IC / 14 / Addison Demetriou; IC / 15 / Brad Fearnley; IC / 17 / Caleb Hamlin-Uele; IC / 18 / Sam Healey; Concussion Substitute: RE / 22 / Trentham Petersen; Reserves: RE / 3 / Manaia Waitere; RE / 19 / Tyler Slade; Coach: / / George Ndaira
20 August	25	Western Suburbs Magpies	Lidcombe Oval, Sydney	Win	56-20	Tom Rodwell (11', 31', 59') 3 Jesse Colquhoun (16') 1 Kayal Iro (34') 1 Jenson Taumoepeau (38') 1 Addison Demetriou (49') 1 Mawene Hiroti (55') 1 Tuku Hau Tapuha (63') 1 Samuel Healey (67') 1 Caleb Uele (74') 1	Mawene Hiroti 4/9 (13', 18', 32', 40'); Niwhai Puru 2/2 (69', 75')		
Team Details: FB / 1 / Mawene Hiroti; WG / 2 / Jensen Taumoepeau; CE / 3 / Addison Demetriou; CE / 4 / Kayal Iro; WG / 5 / Tom Rodwell; FE / 6 / Manaia Waitere; HB / 7 / Niwhai Puru; PR / 8 / Caleb Uele; HK / 9 / Jayden Berrell (c); PR / 10 / Rhys Dakin; SR / 11 / Tuku Hau Tapuha; SR / 12 / Kyle Pickering; LK / 13 / Jesse Colquhoun; Interchange: IC / 14 / Kurt Dillon; IC / 15 / Brad Fearnley; IC / 18 / Sam Healey; IC / 26 / Johnny-Lee Gabrael; Concussion Substitute: RE / 19 / Toby Boothroyd; Coach: / / George Ndaira
27 August	26	Newcastle Knights	McDonald Jones Stadium, Newcastle	Win	48-10	Kayal Iro (19', 66', 71') 3 Sam Stonestreet (14', 40') 2 Kyle Pickering (29') 1 Manaia Waitere (43') 1 Brad Fearnley (47') 1 Jenson Taumoepeau (78') 1	Niwhai Puru 6/9 (31', 42', 45', 48', 68', 79')		
Team Details: FB / 1 / Daniel Atkinson; WG / 2 / Jensen Taumoepeau; CE / 3 / Addison Demetriou; CE / 4 / Kayal Iro; WG / 5 / Tom Rodwell; FE / 6 / Manaia Waitere; HB / 7 / Niwhai Puru; PR / 8 / Caleb Uele; HK / 9 / Jayden Berrell (c); PR / 10 / Rhys Dakin; SR / 11 / Tuku Hau Tapuha; SR / 12 / Kyle Pickering; LK / 19 / Brad Fearnley; Interchange: IC / 13 / Blake Hosking; IC / 14 / Kurt Dillon; IC / 15 / Sam Stonestreet; IC / 18 / Sam Healey; Concussion Substitute: RE / 26 / Johnny-Lee Gabrael; Coach: / / George Ndaira
Legend: Win Loss Draw Bye

=== Jersey Flegg Cup (U21s) ===
==== Regular season ====
Date	Round	Opponent	Venue	Result	Score	Tries	Goals	Field Goals	Report
4 March	1	South Sydney Rabbitohs	PointsBet Stadium, Sydney	Win	24-6	Sam Healey (2') 1 Te Wehi Waitere (25') 1 Max Riolo (61') 1 Lachlan Crouch (65') 1	Max Riolo 4/4 (4', 26', 63', 66')		
Team Details: FB / 1 / Manaia Waitere; WG / 2 / Te Wehi Waitere; CE / 3 / Noah Lester; CE / 4 / Ben Lavender; WG / 5 / Kristian Dixon; FE / 6 / Max Riolo; HB / 7 / Cody Fuz; PR / 8 / Lachlan Crouch; HK / 9 / Sam Healey; PR / 10 / Josh Finau; SR / 11 / Toby Boothroyd; SR / 12 / Henry O'Kane; LK / 13 / Blake Hosking (c); Interchange: IC / 14 / Kobie Wilson; IC / 15 / Salesi Ataata; IC / 16 / Toataua Porima; IC / 17 / Tom Crossle; Concussion Substitute: RE / 18 / Jed Hardy; Reserves: RE / 19 / Tully Wilton; Coach: / / Andrew Dallalana
11 March	2	Parramatta Eels	New Era Stadium, Sydney	Win	34-14	Henry O'Kane (16', 32') 2 Blake Hosking (22') 1 Ben Lavender (28') 1 Cody Fuz (43') 1 Manaia Waitere (68') 1	Max Riolo 4/5 (24', 30', 34', 44'); Cody Fuz 1/1 (69')		
Team Details: FB / 1 / Manaia Waitere; WG / 2 / Te Wehi Waitere; CE / 3 / Noah Lester; CE / 4 / Ben Lavender; WG / 5 / Kristian Dixon; FE / 6 / Max Riolo; HB / 7 / Cody Fuz; PR / 8 / Lachlan Crouch; HK / 9 / Sam Healey; PR / 10 / Max Bradbury; SR / 11 / Toby Boothroyd; SR / 12 / Henry O'Kane; LK / 13 / Blake Hosking (c); Interchange: IC / 14 / Kobie Wilson; IC / 15 / Salesi Ataata; IC / 16 / Toataua Porima; IC / 17 / Tom Crossle; Concussion Substitute: RE / 18 / Jed Hardy; Reserves: RE / 19 / Ethan Cocco; Coach: / / Andrew Dallalana
19 March	3	Canberra Raiders	GIO Stadium, Canberra	Win	28-16	Cody Fuz (12') 1 Toby Boothroyd (19') 1 Noah Lester (22') 1 Sam Healey (42') 1 Cain Barnes (62') 1	Max Riolo 4/5 (13', 21', 23', 43')		
Team Details: FB / 1 / Manaia Waitere; WG / 2 / Te Wehi Waitere; CE / 3 / Noah Lester; CE / 4 / Ben Lavender; WG / 5 / Cain Barnes; FE / 6 / Max Riolo; HB / 7 / Cody Fuz; PR / 8 / Lachlan Crouch; HK / 9 / Sam Healey; PR / 10 / Max Bradbury; SR / 11 / Toby Boothroyd; SR / 12 / Henry O'Kane; LK / 13 / Blake Hosking (c); Interchange: IC / 14 / Kobie Wilson; IC / 15 / Salesi Ataata; IC / 16 / Toataua Porima; IC / 17 / Tom Crossle; Concussion Substitute: RE / 19 / Ethan Cocco; Reserves: RE / 18 / Jed Hardy; Coach: / / Andrew Dallalana
6 May (Note: Match was postponed due to ground availability issues.)	4	St. George Illawarra Dragons	Sid Parrish Park, Sydney	Win	30-22	Ben Lavender (16', 69') 2 Kristian Dixon (26', 51') 2 Manaia Waitere (7') 1 Cain Barnes (42') 1	Max Riolo 3/6 (8', 43', 53')		
Team Details: FB / 1 / Manaia Waitere; WG / 2 / Cain Barnes; CE / 3 / Noah Lester; CE / 4 / Ben Lavender; WG / 5 / Kristian Dixon; FE / 6 / Max Riolo; HB / 7 / Cody Fuz; PR / 19 / Jayden Foye; HK / 9 / Sam Healey; PR / 10 / Josh Finau; SR / 11 / JT Manuofetoa; SR / 12 / Henry O'Kane; LK / 13 / Blake Hosking (c); Interchange: IC / 14 / Kobie Wilson; IC / 15 / Salesi Ataata; IC / 16 / Toataua Porima; IC / 17 / Max Bradbury; Concussion Substitute: RE / 18 / Ethan Cocco; Reserves: RE / 8 / Lachlan Crouch; RE / 20 / Chaz Jarvis; RE / 22 / Felix Fa'atili; Coach: / / Andrew Dallalana
2 April	5	Canterbury-Bankstown Bulldogs	PointsBet Stadium, Sydney	Win	15-14	Cain Barnes (16', 32') 2 Max Riolo (51') 1	Max Riolo 1/3 (17')	Manaia Waitere 1/1 (69')	
Team Details: FB / 1 / Chaz Jarvis; WG / 23 / Cain Barnes; CE / 3 / Noah Lester; CE / 4 / Ben Lavender; WG / 5 / Kristian Dixon; FE / 6 / Max Riolo; HB / 7 / Manaia Waitere; PR / 8 / Lachlan Crouch; HK / 9 / Sam Healey; PR / 10 / Max Bradbury; SR / 11 / Toby Boothroyd; SR / 12 / Henry O'Kane; LK / 13 / Blake Hosking (c); Interchange: IC / 14 / Kobie Wilson; IC / 15 / Salesi Ataata; IC / 17 / Tom Crossle; IC / 18 / Toataua Porima; Concussion Substitute: RE / 19 / Ethan Cocco; Reserves: RE / 2 / Te Wehi Waitere; RE / 16 / Josh Finau; RE / 20 / Jed Hardy; RE / 21 / Jayden Foye; RE / 22 / Tully Wilton; Coach: / / Andrew Dallalana
	6	Bye							
14 April	7	Sydney Roosters	PointsBet Stadium, Sydney	Win	26-6	Cain Barnes (15', 24') 2 Sam Healey (30') 1 Blake Hosking (33') 1 Henry O'Kane (66') 1	Max Riolo 3/5 (31', 34', 68')		
Team Details: FB / 7 / Manaia Waitere; WG / 2 / Cain Barnes; CE / 3 / Noah Lester; CE / 4 / Ben Lavender; WG / 5 / Kristian Dixon; FE / 6 / Max Riolo; HB / 23 / Niwhai Puru; PR / 8 / Lachlan Crouch; HK / 9 / Sam Healey; PR / 10 / Max Bradbury; SR / 11 / Josh Finau; SR / 12 / Henry O'Kane; LK / 13 / Blake Hosking (c); Interchange: IC / 14 / Kobie Wilson; IC / 15 / Salesi Ataata; IC / 16 / Toataua Porima; IC / 17 / JT Manuofetoa; Concussion Substitute: RE / 19 / Ethan Cocco; Reserves: RE / 1 / Chaz Jarvis; RE / 18 / Siteni Taukamo; RE / 20 / Tully Wilton; RE / 21 / Jayden Foye; Coach: / / Andrew Dallalana
21 April	8	Canterbury-Bankstown Bulldogs	Belmore Sports Ground, Sydney	Loss	10-36	Manaia Waitere (6') 1 JT Manuofetoa (47') 1	Max Riolo 1/2 (48')		
Team Details: FB / 1 / Chaz Jarvis; WG / 2 / Cain Barnes; CE / 3 / Noah Lester; CE / 4 / Ben Lavender; WG / 5 / Kristian Dixon; FE / 6 / Max Riolo; HB / 7 / Manaia Waitere (c); PR / 8 / Lachlan Crouch; HK / 9 / Sam Healey; PR / 10 / Max Bradbury; SR / 11 / Josh Finau; SR / 12 / Henry O'Kane; LK / 13 / Ethan Cocco; Interchange: IC / 14 / Kobie Wilson; IC / 15 / Salesi Ataata; IC / 16 / Toataua Porima; IC / 17 / JT Manuofetoa; Concussion Substitute: IC / 18 / Jayden Foye; Reserves: RE / 19 / Siteni Taukamo; Coach: / / Andrew Dallalana
27 April	9	Melbourne Storm	PointsBet Stadium, Sydney	Loss	12-14	Blake Hosking (34') 1 Ben Lavender (62') 1	Niwhai Puru 2/2 (34', 63')		
Team Details: FB / 1 / Manaia Waitere; WG / 18 / Chaz Jarvis; CE / 3 / Noah Lester; CE / 4 / Ben Lavender; WG / 5 / Kristian Dixon; FE / 6 / Max Riolo; HB / 23 / Niwhai Puru; PR / 8 / Lachlan Crouch; HK / 9 / Sam Healey; PR / 10 / Josh Finau; SR / 11 / Toby Boothroyd; SR / 12 / JT Manuofetoa; LK / 13 / Blake Hosking (c); Interchange: IC / 14 / Kobie Wilson; IC / 15 / Salesi Ataata; IC / 17 / Ethan Cocco; IC / 19 / Jayden Foye; Concussion Substitute: RE / 22 / Felix Fa'atili; Reserves: RE / 2 / Siteni Taukamo; RE / 7 / Cody Fuz; RE / 16 / Toataua Porima; Coach: / / Andrew Dallalana
	10	Bye							
14 May	11	Manly Sea Eagles	4 Pines Park, Sydney	Win	40-4	Cain Barnes (29', 42') 2 Cody Fuz (2') 1 Noah Lester (11') 1 Blake Hosking (18') 1 Max Riolo (45') 1 Kristian Dixon (57') 1 Kobie Wilson (64') 1	Max Riolo 4/8 (3', 43', 46', 66')		
Team Details: FB / 23 / Chaz Jarvis; WG / 2 / Cain Barnes; CE / 3 / Noah Lester; CE / 4 / Ben Lavender; WG / 5 / Kristian Dixon; FE / 6 / Max Riolo; HB / 7 / Cody Fuz; PR / 8 / Lachlan Crouch; HK / 9 / Sam Healey; PR / 10 / Josh Finau; SR / 11 / JT Manuofetoa; SR / 12 / Henry O'Kane; LK / 13 / Blake Hosking (c); Interchange: IC / 14 / Kobie Wilson; IC / 15 / Toby Boothroyd; IC / 16 / Max Bradbury; IC / 19 / Jayden Foye; Concussion Substitute: RE / 17 / Ethan Cocco; Reserves: RE / 1 / Manaia Waitere; RE / 18 / Paaua Papuni-Abbott; RE / 20 / Te Wehi Waitere; RE / 22 / Felix Fa'atili; Coach: / / Andrew Dallalana
20 May	12	Newcastle Knights	Henson Park, Sydney	Win	26-20	Josh Finau (12') 1 Kristian Dixon (16') 1 Cody Fuz (20') 1 Ben Lavender (40') 1 Cain Barnes (62') 1	Max Riolo 2/3 (13', 22'); Kristian Dixon 1/2 (42')		
Team Details: FB / 1 / Manaia Waitere; WG / 2 / Cain Barnes; CE / 3 / Noah Lester; CE / 4 / Ben Lavender; WG / 5 / Kristian Dixon; FE / 6 / Max Riolo; HB / 7 / Cody Fuz; PR / 16 / Max Bradbury; HK / 9 / Sam Healey; PR / 10 / Josh Finau; SR / 11 / JT Manuofetoa; SR / 12 / Henry O'Kane; LK / 13 / Blake Hosking (c); Interchange: IC / 8 / Lachlan Crouch; IC / 14 / Kobie Wilson; IC / 15 / Salesi Ataata; IC / 17 / Toby Boothroyd; Concussion Substitute: RE / 19 / Jayden Foye; Reserves: RE / 18 / Chaz Jarvis; Coach: / / Andrew Dallalana
28 May	13	Sydney Roosters	Wentworth Park, Sydney	Loss	14-35	Kristian Dixon (28') 1 Noah Lester (31') 1 Henry O'Kane (62') 1	Kristian Dixon 1/3 (63')		
Team Details: FB / 1 / Chaz Jarvis; WG / 2 / Cain Barnes; CE / 3 / Noah Lester; CE / 4 / Ben Lavender; WG / 5 / Kristian Dixon; FE / 6 / Tully Wilton; HB / 7 / Manaia Waitere; PR / 8 / Lachlan Crouch; HK / 9 / Sam Healey; PR / 10 / Josh Finau; SR / 11 / Toby Boothroyd; SR / 12 / Henry O'Kane; LK / 13 / Blake Hosking (c); Interchange: IC / 14 / Kobie Wilson; IC / 15 / Salesi Ataata; IC / 16 / Max Bradbury; IC / 17 / Ethan Cocco; Concussion Substitute: RE / 18 / Jayden Foye; Reserves: RE / 19 / Felix Fa'atili; RE / 20 / Te Wehi Waitere; RE / 21 / Sam McCulloch; RE / 22 / Toataua Porima; Coach: / / Andrew Dallalana
3 June	14	Wests Tigers	PointsBet Stadium, Sydney	Win	12-8	Tully Wilton (59') 1 Kobie Wilson (67') 1	Niwhai Puru 2/2 (60', 68')		
Team Details: FB / 1 / Manaia Waitere; WG / 2 / Cain Barnes; CE / 3 / Noah Lester; CE / 4 / Ben Lavender; WG / 5 / Kristian Dixon; FE / 6 / Tully Wilton; HB / 7 / Niwhai Puru; PR / 8 / Lachlan Crouch; HK / 9 / Sam Healey; PR / 10 / Josh Finau; SR / 11 / Toby Boothroyd; SR / 12 / Henry O'Kane; LK / 13 / Blake Hosking (c); Interchange: IC / 14 / Kobie Wilson; IC / 15 / Salesi Ataata; IC / 16 / Max Bradbury; IC / 17 / Ethan Cocco; Concussion Substitute: RE / 22 / Felix Fa'atili; Reserves: RE / 18 / Chaz Jarvis; RE / 19 / Jayden Foye; RE / 20 / Jake Hay; Coach: / / Andrew Dallalana
11 June	15	Melbourne Storm	Gosch's Paddock, Melbourne	Loss	18-28	Blake Hosking (11') 1 Ben Lavender (16') 1 Kristian Dixon (30') 1 Max Bradbury (36') 1	Jake Hay 1/4 (12')		
Team Details: FB / 1 / Chaz Jarvis; WG / 2 / Cain Barnes; CE / 3 / Noah Lester; CE / 4 / Ben Lavender; WG / 5 / Kristian Dixon; FE / 6 / Jake Hay; HB / 7 / Tully Wilton; PR / 8 / Lachlan Crouch; HK / 14 / Kobie Wilson; PR / 10 / Josh Finau; SR / 11 / Toby Boothroyd; SR / 12 / Henry O'Kane; LK / 13 / Blake Hosking (c); Interchange: IC / 15 / Salesi Ataata; IC / 16 / Max Bradbury; IC / 17 / Ethan Cocco; IC / 21 / Sam McCulloch; Concussion Substitute: RE / 19 / Jayden Foye; Reserves: RE / 9 / Sam Healey; RE / 18 / Paaua Papuni-Abbott; RE / 20 / Te Wehi Waitere; Coach: / / Andrew Dallalana
	16	Bye							
24 June	17	Parramatta Eels	PointsBet Stadium, Sydney	Loss	12-22	Kobie Wilson (31') 1 Chaz Jarvis (66') 1	Max Riolo 2/2 (33', 67')		
Team Details: FB / 1 / Chaz Jarvis; WG / 2 / Cain Barnes; CE / 3 / Noah Lester; CE / 4 / Ben Lavender; WG / 5 / Kristian Dixon; FE / 6 / Max Riolo; HB / 7 / Jake Hay; PR / 8 / Max Bradbury; HK / 9 / Kobie Wilson; PR / 10 / Josh Finau; SR / 11 / Toby Boothroyd; SR / 12 / Henry O'Kane; LK / 13 / Blake Hosking (c); Interchange: IC / 14 / Tully Wilton; IC / 15 / Salesi Ataata; IC / 16 / Lachlan Crouch; IC / 17 / Sam McCulloch; Concussion Substitute: RE / 18 / Te Wehi Waitere; Reserves: RE / 19 / Jayden Foye; RE / 22 / Tre Fotu; Coach: / / Andrew Dallalana
29 June	18	St. George Illawarra Dragons	PointsBet Stadium, Sydney	Loss	18-34	Kristian Dixon (10', 17') 2 Felix Fa'atili (53') 1 Toby Boothroyd (56') 1	Kristian Dixon 1/2 (54'); Max Riolo 0/2		
Team Details: FB / 1 / Manaia Waitere; WG / 2 / Te Wehi Waitere; CE / 3 / Noah Lester; CE / 4 / Ben Lavender; WG / 5 / Kristian Dixon; FE / 6 / Max Riolo; HB / 7 / Tully Wilton; PR / 8 / Lachlan Crouch; HK / 9 / Sam Healey; PR / 10 / Salesi Ataata; SR / 11 / Toby Boothroyd; SR / 12 / Henry O'Kane; LK / 13 / Blake Hosking (c); Interchange: IC / 14 / Kobie Wilson; IC / 15 / Max Bradbury; IC / 16 / Josh Finau; IC / 17 / Sam McCulloch; Concussion Substitute: RE / 18 / Felix Fa'atili; Reserves: RE / 19 / Jayden Foye; Coach: / / Andrew Dallalana
8 July	19	Penrith Panthers	PointsBet Stadium, Sydney	Loss	16-18	Te Wehi Waitere (12') 1 Felix Fa'atili (59') 1 Tully Wilton (63') 1	Niwhai Puru 2/3 (60', 63')		
Team Details: FB / 1 / Manaia Waitere (c); WG / 2 / Te Wehi Waitere; CE / 20 / Ben Lavender; CE / 4 / Chris Vea'ila; WG / 5 / Kristian Dixon; FE / 3 / Noah Lester; HB / 19 / Niwhai Puru; PR / 8 / Jayden Foye; HK / 14 / Kobie Wilson; PR / 10 / Salesi Ataata; SR / 11 / Toby Boothroyd; SR / 12 / Henry O'Kane; LK / 13 / Lachlan Crouch; Interchange: IC / 7 / Tully Wilton; IC / 15 / Felix Fa'atili; IC / 16 / Sam McCulloch; IC / 17 / Ethan Cocco; Concussion Substitute: RE / 18 / JT Manuofetoa; Reserves: RE / 6 / Max Riolo; RE / 9 / Sam Healey; Coach: / / Andrew Dallalana
15 July	20	South Sydney Rabbitohs	Redfern Oval, Sydney	Win	20-12	Salesi Ataata (6') 1 Manaia Waitere (13') 1 Toby Boothroyd (30') 1 Max Riolo (36') 1	Max Riolo 2/4 (8', 38')		
Team Details: FB / 1 / Manaia Waitere (c); WG / 2 / Te Wehi Waitere; CE / 3 / Ben Lavender; CE / 4 / Chris Vea'ila; WG / 5 / Kristian Dixon; FE / 6 / Max Riolo; HB / 7 / Noah Lester; PR / 8 / Jayden Foye; HK / 9 / Kobie Wilson; PR / 10 / Salesi Ataata; SR / 18 / JT Manuofetoa; SR / 12 / Henry O'Kane; LK / 13 / Lachlan Crouch; Interchange: IC / 11 / Toby Boothroyd; IC / 14 / Tully Wilton; IC / 15 / Felix Fa'atili; IC / 17 / Ethan Cocco; Concussion Substitute: RE / 19 / Paaua Papuni-Abbott; Reserves: RE / 16 / Sam McCulloch; RE / 20 / Taj Brailey; Coach: / / Andrew Dallalana
23 July	21	Manly Sea Eagles	PointsBet Stadium, Sydney	Win	22-16	Felix Fa'atili (29') 1 Te Wehi Waitere (49') 1 Lachlan Crouch (52') 1 Kristian Dixon (57') 1	Kristian Dixon 3/4 (30', 50', 54')		
Team Details: FB / 1 / Chaz Jarvis; WG / 2 / Te Wehi Waitere; CE / 3 / Ben Lavender; CE / 4 / Chris Vea'ila; WG / 5 / Kristian Dixon; FE / 6 / Max Riolo; HB / 7 / Noah Lester (c); PR / 8 / Jayden Foye; HK / 14 / Kobie Wilson; PR / 10 / Salesi Ataata; SR / 11 / JT Manuofetoa; SR / 12 / Henry O'Kane; LK / 13 / Lachlan Crouch; Interchange: IC / 15 / Felix Fa'atili; IC / 16 / Toby Boothroyd; IC / 17 / Ethan Cocco; IC / 19 / Tully Wilton; Concussion Substitute: RE / 18 / Paaua Papuni-Abbott; Reserves: RE / 9 / Sam Healey; RE / 20 / Siteni Taukamo; Coach: / / Andrew Dallalana
29 July	22	Penrith Panthers	Henson Park, Sydney	Loss	20-22	Kristian Dixon (8') 1 Henry O'Kane (12') 1 Lachlan Crouch (21') 1 Noah Lester (51') 1	Kristian Dixon 2/4 (13', 23')		
Team Details: FB / 1 / Siteni Taukamo; WG / 2 / Cain Barnes; CE / 3 / Ben Lavender; CE / 4 / Chris Vea'ila; WG / 5 / Kristian Dixon; FE / 6 / Tully Wilton; HB / 7 / Noah Lester (c); PR / 8 / Jayden Foye; HK / 9 / Kobie Wilson; PR / 10 / Salesi Ataata; SR / 11 / JT Manuofetoa; SR / 12 / Henry O'Kane; LK / 13 / Lachlan Crouch; Interchange: IC / 14 / Chaz Jarvis; IC / 15 / Felix Fa'atili; IC / 16 / Toby Boothroyd; IC / 17 / Ethan Cocco; Concussion Substitute: RE / 18 / Paaua Papuni-Abbott; Reserves: RE / 19 / Tre Fotu; RE / 20 / Dylan Coutts; Coach: / / Andrew Dallalana
	23	Bye							
11 August	24	Canberra Raiders	PointsBet Stadium, Sydney	Win	34-16	Kristian Dixon (45', 58', 68') 3 Tully Wilton (5') 1 Ben Lavender (8') 1 Manaia Waitere (12') 1 Siteni Taukamo (34') 1	Kristian Dixon 3/7 (6', 10', 13')		
Team Details: FB / 20 / Manaia Waitere (c); WG / 1 / Siteni Taukamo; CE / 3 / Ben Lavender; CE / 4 / Chris Vea'ila; WG / 5 / Kristian Dixon; FE / 6 / Tully Wilton; HB / 7 / Noah Lester; PR / 8 / Jayden Foye; HK / 9 / Kobie Wilson; PR / 10 / Salesi Ataata; SR / 11 / Toby Boothroyd; SR / 12 / Henry O'Kane; LK / 13 / Lachlan Crouch; Interchange: IC / 14 / JT Manuofetoa; IC / 15 / Felix Fa'atili; IC / 16 / Paaua Papuni-Abbott; IC / 17 / Ethan Cocco; Concussion Substitute: RE / 18 / Dylan Coutts; Reserves: RE / 2 / Te Wehi Waitere; RE / 19 / Chaz Jarvis; Coach: / / Andrew Dallalana
20 August	25	Wests Tigers	Lidcombe Oval, Lidcombe	Win	34–10	Kristian Dixon (4', 43') 2 Te Wehi Waitere (9', 40') 2 Salesi Ataata (54') 1 Lachlan Crouch (62') 1	Kristian Dixon 5/7 (5', 11', 56', 63', 69' pen)		
Team Details: FB / 1 / Siteni Taukamo; WG / 2 / Te Wehi Waitere; CE / 3 / Ben Lavender; CE / 4 / Chris Vea'ila; WG / 5 / Kristian Dixon; FE / 6 / Tully Wilton; HB / 7 / Noah Lester (c); PR / 10 / Salesi Ataata; HK / 9 / Kobie Wilson; PR / 13 / Lachlan Crouch; SR / 11 / Toby Boothroyd; SR / 14 / JT Manuofetoa; LK / 20 / Blake Hosking; Interchange: IC / 8 / Jayden Foye; IC / 15 / Felix Fa'atili; IC / 16 / Paaua Papuni-Abbott; IC / 17 / Ethan Cocco; Concussion Substitute: RE / 23 / Lawson Cotter; Coach: / / Andrew Dallalana
27 August	26	Newcastle Knights	Newcastle Centre of Excellence, Newcastle	Win	30–26	Tully Wilton (17') 1 Toby Boothroyd (20') 1 Ethan Cocco (32') 1 Kristian Dixon (41') 1 Henry O'Kane (48') 1	Kristian Dixon 5/5 (18', 22', 34', 43', 50')		
Team Details: FB / 2 / Siteni Taukamo; WG / 5 / Kristian Dixon; CE / 3 / Ben Lavender; CE / 4 / Chris Vea'ila; WG / 23 / Te Wehi Waitere; FE / 6 / Tully Wilton; HB / 7 / Noah Lester (c); PR / 10 / Salesi Ataata; HK / 9 / Kobie Wilson; PR / 16 / Jayden Foye; SR / 11 / Toby Boothroyd; SR / 12 / Henry O'Kane; LK / 8 / Lachlan Crouch; Interchange: IC / 14 / JT Manuofetoa; IC / 15 / Felix Fa'atili; IC / 17 / Ethan Cocco; IC / 21 / Paaua Papuni-Abbott; Concussion Substitute: RE / 23 / Riley Pollard; Reserves: RE / 19 / Tully Wilton; Coach: / / Andrew Dallalana
Legend: Win Loss Draw Bye

==== Finals Series ====
Date	Round	Opponent	Venue	Result	Score	Tries	Goals	Field Goals	Report
3 September	FW1	Canterbury-Bankstown Bulldogs	Netstrata Jubilee Stadium, Sydney	Loss	44–22	Kristian Dixon (27') 1 Blake Hosking (31') 1 Siteni Taukamo (42', 50') 2	Kristian Dixon 3/4 (29', 31', 51')		
Team Details: FB / 2 / Siteni Taukamo; WG / 5 / Kristian Dixon; CE / 4 / Chris Vea'ila; CE / 7 / Noah Lester (c); WG / 22 / Sam Stonestreet; FE / 6 / Tully Wilton; HB / 1 / Manaia Waitere; PR / 8 / Lachlan Crouch; HK / 9 / Samuel Healey; PR / 10 / Salesi Ataata; SR / 11 / Toby Boothroyd; SR / 12 / Henry O'Kane; LK / 13 / Blake Hosking; Interchange: IC / 14 / Kobie Wilson; IC / 15 / Felix Fa'atili; IC / 17 / Ethan Cocco; IC / 19 / Max Bradbury; Concussion Substitute: RE / 18 / JT Manuofetoa; Coach: / / Andrew Dallalana
9 September	FW2	Parramatta Eels	Leichhardt Oval, Sydney	Loss	20–6	Manaia Waitere (40') 1	Kristian Dixon 1/1 (42')		
Team Details: FB / 1 / Siteni Taukamo; WG / 2 / Sam Stonestreet; CE / 3 / Noah Lester (c); CE / 4 / Chris Vea'ila; WG / 5 / Kristian Dixon; FE / 6 / Tully Wilton; HB / 7 / Manaia Waitere; PR / 8 / Lachlan Crouch; HK / 9 / Samuel Healey; PR / 16 / Max Bradbury; SR / 11 / Toby Boothroyd; SR / 21 / Henry O'Kane; LK / 13 / Blake Hosking; Interchange: IC / 10 / Salesi Ataata; IC / 14 / Kobie Wilson; IC / 15 / Jayden Foye; IC / 17 / Ethan Cocco; Concussion Substitute: RE / 18 / JT Manuofetoa; Coach: / / Andrew Dallalana
Legend: Win Loss Draw Bye

=== Harvey Norman Women's Premiership ===
==== Regular season ====
Date	Round	Opponent	Venue	Result	Score	Tries	Goals	Field Goals	Report
4 February	1	Wests Tigers	Campbelltown Sports Stadium, Sydney	Win	30-18	Ella Barker (43', 60') 2 Tayla Curtis (21') 1 Brandi Davis-Welsh (26') 1 Monique Donovan (55') 1 Rhiannon Byers (69') 1	Maddie Studdon 3/6 (23', 51', 70')		
Team Details: FB / 1 / Cassie Staples; WG / 2 / Brandi Davis-Welsh; CE / 3 / Monique Donovan; CE / 4 / Kiana Takairangi; WG / 5 / Ella Barker; FE / 6 / Zali Hopkins; HB / 7 / Maddie Studdon; PR / 8 / Sarah Boyle; HK / 9 / Sienna Stewart; PR / 13 / Natasha Penitani; SR / 11 / Rhiannon Byers; SR / 12 / Tayla Curtis (c); LK / 10 / Ellie Johnston; Interchange: IC / 14 / Felicity Powdrell; IC / 15 / Jazmon Tupou-Witchman; IC / 16 / Mackenzie Lear; IC / 17 / Chloe Saunders; Concussion Substitute: RE / 19 / Stephanie Ball; Coach: / / Ruan Sims
11 February	2	North Sydney Bears	Hills Grammar, Kenthurst	Loss	10-22	Ella Barker (11') 1 Tayla Curtis (51') 1	Maddie Studdon 1/2 (53')		
Team Details: FB / 1 / Cassie Staples; WG / 2 / Brandi Davis-Welsh; CE / 3 / Monique Donovan; CE / 13 / Chloe Saunders; WG / 5 / Ella Barker; FE / 6 / Zali Hopkins; HB / 7 / Maddie Studdon; PR / 8 / Natasha Penitani; HK / 9 / Sienna Stewart; PR / 17 / Jazmon Tupou-Witchman; SR / 11 / Tayla Curtis (c); SR / 12 / Rhiannon Byers; LK / 10 / Ellie Johnston; Interchange: IC / 14 / Felicity Powdrell; IC / 15 / Tegan Dymock; IC / 16 / Stephanie Ball; IC / 19 / Mackenzie Lear; Concussion Substitute: RE / 18 / Macie Carlile; Reserves: RE / 4 / Kiana Takairangi; RE / 20 / Sarah Boyle; Coach: / / Ruan Sims
18 February	3	Central Coast Roosters	Cronulla High School, Sydney	Loss	12-14	Andie Robinson (27') 1 Tayla Curtis (69') 1	Maddie Studdon 2/2 (29', 69')		
Team Details: FB / 1 / Cassie Staples; WG / 2 / Zali Fay; CE / 3 / Monique Donovan; CE / 4 / Andie Robinson; WG / 5 / Ella Barker; FE / 6 / Zali Hopkins; HB / 7 / Maddie Studdon; PR / 8 / Jazmon Tupou-Witchman; HK / 9 / Quincy Dodd; PR / 10 / Tegan Dymock; SR / 11 / Rhiannon Byers; SR / 12 / Tayla Curtis (c); LK / 13 / Chloe Saunders; Interchange: IC / 14 / Felicity Powdrell; IC / 15 / Natasha Penitani; IC / 16 / Macie Carlile; IC / 22 / Grace Uliuburotu; Concussion Substitute: RE / 19 / Sarah Boyle; Coach: / / Ruan Sims
26 February	4	Canterbury-Bankstown Bulldogs	PointsBet Stadium, Sydney	Loss	21-22	Kiana Takairangi (30') 1 Monique Donovan (34') 1 Rhiannon Byers (47') 1 Brooke Anderson (58') 1	Maddie Studdon 2/4 (49', 59')	Maddie Studdon 1/1 (69')	
Team Details: FB / 1 / Tiana Penitani; WG / 2 / Cassie Staples; CE / 3 / Kiana Takairangi; CE / 4 / Andie Robinson; WG / 5 / Zali Fay; FE / 6 / Zali Hopkins; HB / 7 / Maddie Studdon; PR / 8 / Jazmon Tupou-Witchman; HK / 9 / Quincy Dodd; PR / 10 / Ellie Johnston; SR / 11 / Tayla Curtis (c); SR / 12 / Rhiannon Byers; LK / 13 / Brooke Anderson; Interchange: IC / 14 / Chloe Saunders; IC / 15 / Tegan Dymock; IC / 16 / Macie Carlile; IC / 17 / Monique Donovan; Concussion Substitute: RE / 18 / Felicity Powdrell; Coach: / / Ruan Sims
4 March	5	South Sydney Rabbitohs	Cronulla High School, Sydney	Win	14-10	Ella Barker (13') 1 Macie Carlile (32') 1 Tiana Penitani (48') 1	Maddie Studdon 1/3 (33')		
Team Details: FB / 1 / Tiana Penitani; WG / 19 / Ella Barker; CE / 3 / Monique Donovan; CE / 2 / Kiana Takairangi; WG / 5 / Cassie Staples; FE / 6 / Zali Hopkins; HB / 7 / Maddie Studdon; PR / 8 / Jazmon Tupou-Witchman; HK / 9 / Quincy Dodd; PR / 10 / Ellie Johnston; SR / 15 / Chloe Saunders; SR / 12 / Tayla Curtis (c); LK / 13 / Brooke Anderson; Interchange: IC / 14 / Felicity Powdrell; IC / 16 / Macie Carlile; IC / 17 / Sarah Boyle; IC / 20 / Natasha Penitani; Concussion Substitute: RE / 18 / Mackenzie Lear; Reserves: RE / 4 / Andie Robinson; RE / 15 / Tegan Dymock; Coach: / / Ruan Sims
11 March	6	Wentworthville Magpies	Ringrose Park, Sydney	Win	36-10	Zali Fay (9', 23', 27') 3 Quincy Dodd (31') 1 Andie Robinson (50') 1 Chloe Saunders (58') 1 Brooke Anderson (61') 1	Maddie Studdon 4/7 (25', 33', 52', 63')		
Team Details: FB / 2 / Cassie Staples; WG / 17 / Monique Donovan; CE / 3 / Kiana Takairangi; CE / 4 / Andie Robinson; WG / 5 / Zali Fay; FE / 6 / Zali Hopkins; HB / 7 / Maddie Studdon; PR / 8 / Jazmon Tupou-Witchman; HK / 9 / Quincy Dodd; PR / 10 / Ellie Johnston; SR / 11 / Chloe Saunders; SR / 12 / Tayla Curtis (c); LK / 13 / Brooke Anderson; Interchange: IC / 14 / Nakia Davis-Welsh; IC / 15 / Natasha Penitani; IC / 16 / Macie Carlile; IC / 18 / Mackenzie Lear; Concussion Substitute: RE / 19 / Ella Barker; Reserves: RE / 1 / Tiana Penitani; Coach: / / Ruan Sims
20 March	7	Mount Pritchard Mounties	NSWRL Centre of Excellence, Sydney	Loss	12-30	Zali Fay (9') 1 Brooke Anderson (14') 1 Kiana Takairangi (53') 1	Maddie Studdon 0/3		
Team Details: FB / 19 / Tiana Penitani; WG / 1 / Cassie Staples; CE / 3 / Kiana Takairangi; CE / 4 / Andie Robinson; WG / 5 / Zali Fay; FE / 6 / Zali Hopkins; HB / 7 / Maddie Studdon; PR / 8 / Jazmon Tupou-Witchman; HK / 9 / Quincy Dodd; PR / 10 / Ellie Johnston; SR / 17 / Mackenzie Lear; SR / 20 / Rhiannon Byers; LK / 13 / Brooke Anderson; Interchange: IC / 11 / Chloe Saunders; IC / 14 / Nakia Davis-Welsh; IC / 15 / Natasha Penitani; IC / 16 / Macie Carlile; Concussion Substitute: RE / 2 / Monique Donovan; Reserves: RE / 12 / Tayla Curtis (c); RE / 18 / Ella Barker; Coach: / / Ruan Sims
26 March	8	St. George Dragons	Cronulla High School, Sydney (Note: Match was originally set to take place at PointsBet Stadium.)	Win	46-12	Ella Barker (10', 33') 2 Ellie Johnston (13', 20') 2 Nakia Davis-Welsh (16', 51') 2 Jada Taylor (30', 65') 2 Chloe Saunders (0') 1 Sarah Boyle (67') 1	Felicity Powdrell 3/8 (21', 53', 68'); Sarah Boyle 0/2		
Team Details: FB / 1 / Jada Taylor; WG / 2 / Ella Barker; CE / 3 / Monique Donovan; CE / 4 / Kiana Takairangi; WG / 5 / Brandi Davis-Welsh; FE / 6 / Nakia Davis-Welsh; HB / 7 / Maddie Studdon; PR / 8 / Jazmon Tupou-Witchman; HK / 14 / Brooke Anderson; PR / 10 / Tegan Dymock; SR / 11 / Chloe Saunders; SR / 12 / Ellie Johnston; LK / 13 / Felicity Powdrell; Interchange: IC / 9 / Sienna Stewart; IC / 15 / Sarah Boyle; IC / 17 / Chloe Boston; IC / 22 / Grace Uluiburotu; Concussion Substitute: RE / 18 / Holly Furness; Coach: / / Ruan Sims
3 April	9	Illawarra Steelers	Collegians Sporting Complex, Wollongong (Note: Match was originally set to take place at Sid Parrish Park, Sydney.)	Loss	22-24	Quincy Dodd (26') 1 Zali Fay (29') 1 Tegan Dymock (36') 1 Kiana Takairangi (48') 1	Maddie Studdon 3/4 (28', 31', 37')		
Team Details: FB / 2 / Cassie Staples; WG / 19 / Ella Barker; CE / 3 / Tiana Penitani; CE / 4 / Kiana Takairangi; WG / 5 / Zali Fay; FE / 6 / Zali Hopkins; HB / 7 / Maddie Studdon; PR / 8 / Jazmon Tupou-Witchman; HK / 9 / Quincy Dodd; PR / 10 / Ellie Johnston; SR / 11 / Rhiannon Byers; SR / 12 / Chloe Saunders; LK / 13 / Brooke Anderson; Interchange: IC / 14 / Nakia Davis-Welsh; IC / 15 / Tegan Dymock; IC / 16 / Macie Carlile; IC / 17 / Mackenzie Lear; Concussion Substitute: RE / 18 / Felicity Powdrell; Reserves: RE / 1 / Jada Taylor; Coach: / / Ruan Sims
	10	Bye							
15 April	11	Newcastle Knights	St Johns Oval, Newcastle	Loss	4-30	Zali Fay (1') 1	Maddie Studdon 0/1		
Team Details: FB / 1 / Jada Taylor; WG / 2 / Cassie Staples; CE / 3 / Tiana Penitani; CE / 4 / Monique Donovan; WG / 5 / Zali Fay; FE / 6 / Zali Hopkins; HB / 7 / Maddie Studdon; PR / 8 / Jazmon Tupou-Witchman; HK / 9 / Quincy Dodd; PR / 10 / Ellie Johnston; SR / 11 / Rhiannon Byers; SR / 12 / Mackenzie Lear; LK / 13 / Chloe Saunders; Interchange: IC / 14 / Nakia Davis-Welsh; IC / 15 / Sarah Boyle; IC / 16 / Macie Carlile; IC / 17 / Sienna Stewart; Concussion Substitute: RE / 18 / Holly Furness; Coach: / / Ruan Sims
Legend: Win Loss Draw Bye

== NSWRL Junior Reps ==
=== SG Ball Cup (U19s) ===
==== Regular season ====
Date	Round	Opponent	Venue	Result	Score	Tries	Goals	Field Goals	Report
4 February	1	Balmain Tigers	Leichhardt Oval, Sydney	Win	42-24	Sam McCulloch (1', 45') 2 Felix Fa'atili (7') 1 Dylan Christensen (10') 1 Osca Catton (28') 1 Luke Raymond (33') 1 Junior Taupau (49') 1	Bryce Sait 7/7 (3', 8', 11', 30', 34', 46', 51')		
Team Details: FB / 1 / Jett Forbes; WG / 2 / Osca Catton; CE / 3 / Talanoa Penitani; CE / 4 / Jacob Taulani; WG / 5 / Richard Whalebone; FE / 6 / Dylan Christensen; HB / 7 / Bryce Sait; PR / 8 / Lachlan Crossle; HK / 9 / Taj Brailey; PR / 10 / Felix Fa'atili; SR / 11 / Lawson Cotter (c); SR / 12 / Luke Raymond; LK / 13 / Sam McCulloch; Interchange: IC / 14 / Junior Taupau; IC / 15 / Cruiz Devine; IC / 17 / Riley Lester; IC / 19 / Lachlan Araullo; Concussion Substitute: RE / 18 / Albert Litisoni; Reserves: RE / 16 / Zane Watson; RE / 18 / Blake Woodger; RE / 19 / Jai Davies; Coach: / / Dave Howlett
11 February	2	North Sydney Bears	Hills Grammar, Kenthurst	Loss	16-24	Talanoa Penitani (1') 1 Felix Fa'atili (19') 1 Jacob Taulani (25') 1	Bryce Sait 2/3 (3', 20')		
Team Details: FB / 1 / Jett Forbes; WG / 2 / Talanoa Penitani; CE / 3 / Tre Fotu; CE / 4 / Jacob Taulani; WG / 5 / Richard Whalebone; FE / 6 / Dylan Christensen; HB / 7 / Bryce Sait; PR / 8 / Lachlan Crossle; HK / 9 / Taj Brailey; PR / 10 / Felix Fa'atili; SR / 11 / Lawson Cotter (c); SR / 12 / Luke Raymond; LK / 13 / Sam McCulloch; Interchange: IC / 16 / Lachlan Araullo; IC / 17 / Riley Lester; IC / 19 / Jai Davies; IC / 21 / Zane Watson; Concussion Substitute: RE / 18 / Osca Catton; Reserves: RE / 14 / Junior Taupau; RE / 15 / Cruiz Devine; Coach: / / Dave Howlett
18 February	3	Sydney Roosters	Henson Park, Sydney	Loss	12-54	Felix Fa'atili (5') 1 Jett Forbes (27') 1	Dylan Christensen 2/2 (6', 28')		
Team Details: FB / 18 / Osca Catton; WG / 2 / Talanoa Penitani; CE / 3 / Tre Fotu; CE / 4 / Jacob Taulani; WG / 1 / Jett Forbes; FE / 6 / Dylan Christensen; HB / 7 / Bryce Sait; PR / 8 / Lachlan Crossle; HK / 9 / Taj Brailey; PR / 10 / Felix Fa'atili; SR / 11 / Lawson Cotter (c); SR / 20 / Dylan Coutts; LK / 13 / Sam McCulloch; Interchange: IC / 12 / Luke Raymond; IC / 14 / Junior Taupau; IC / 16 / Lachlan Araullo; IC / 17 / Riley Lester; Concussion Substitute: RE / 5 / Tanna Featherstone; Reserves: RE / 5 / Richard Whalebone; RE / 15 / Cruiz Devine; RE / 19 / Jai Davies; RE / 21 / Zane Watson; Coach: / / Dave Howlett
25 February	4	Melbourne Storm	PointsBet Stadium, Sydney	Win	34-16	Dylan Christensen (16') 1 Sam McCulloch (19') 1 Tre Fotu (27') 1 Felix Fa'atili (37') 1 Dylan Coutts (41') 1 Lawson Cotter (66') 1	Bryce Sait 5/6 (17', 21', 38', 42', 67')		
Team Details: FB / 1 / Jett Forbes; WG / 2 / Talanoa Penitani; CE / 3 / Tre Fotu; CE / 4 / Jacob Taulani; WG / 5 / Richard Whalebone; FE / 6 / Dylan Christensen; HB / 7 / Bryce Sait; PR / 8 / Lachlan Crossle; HK / 9 / Taj Brailey; PR / 10 / Felix Fa'atili; SR / 11 / Lawson Cotter (c); SR / 12 / Dylan Coutts; LK / 13 / Sam McCulloch; Interchange: IC / 14 / Luke Raymond; IC / 15 / Cruiz Devine; IC / 17 / Riley Lester; IC / 21 / Samson Mairi; Concussion Substitute: RE / 18 / Osca Catton; Reserves: RE / 16 / Lachlan Araullo; Coach: / / Dave Howlett
5 March	5	South Sydney Rabbitohs	PointsBet Stadium, Sydney	Win	32-16	Felix Fa'atili (34', 40') 2 Luke Raymond (19') 1 Sam McCulloch (22') 1 Dylan Christensen (55') 1 Richard Whalebone (61') 1	Bryce Sait 4/5 (20', 35', 41', 56')		
Team Details: FB / 1 / Jett Forbes; WG / 2 / Talanoa Penitani; CE / 18 / Tanna Featherstone; CE / 4 / Jacob Taulani; WG / 5 / Richard Whalebone; FE / 6 / Dylan Christensen; HB / 7 / Bryce Sait; PR / 8 / Lachlan Crossle; HK / 9 / Taj Brailey; PR / 10 / Felix Fa'atili; SR / 11 / Lawson Cotter (c); SR / 12 / Dylan Coutts; LK / 13 / Sam McCulloch; Interchange: IC / 14 / Luke Raymond; IC / 16 / Lachlan Araullo; IC / 20 / Harrison Hood; IC / 21 / Samson Mairi; Concussion Substitute: RE / 17 / Riley Lester; Reserves: RE / 3 / Tre Fotu; RE / 15 / Cruiz Devine; RE / 18 / Osca Catton; Coach: / / Dave Howlett
11 March	6	Parramatta Eels	New Era Stadium, Sydney	Loss	16-20	Kurt Montgomery (23', 64') 2 Sam McCulloch (1') 1	Bryce Sait 2/3 (1', 25')		
Team Details: FB / 1 / Jett Forbes; WG / 2 / Talanoa Penitani; CE / 3 / Tre Fotu; CE / 19 / Kurt Montgomery; WG / 5 / Richard Whalebone; FE / 6 / Dylan Christensen; HB / 7 / Bryce Sait; PR / 8 / Lachlan Crossle; HK / 9 / Taj Brailey; PR / 16 / Lachlan Araullo; SR / 11 / Lawson Cotter (c); SR / 12 / Dylan Coutts; LK / 13 / Sam McCulloch; Interchange: IC / 4 / Jacob Taulani; IC / 14 / Luke Raymond; IC / 20 / Harrison Hood; IC / 21 / Samson Mairi; Concussion Substitute: RE / 17 / Riley Lester; Reserves: RE / 10 / Felix Fa'atili; RE / 18 / Osca Catton; Coach: / / Dave Howlett
18 March	7	Canberra Raiders	Raiders Belconnen, Canberra	Loss	22-30	Tre Fotu (8') 1 Albert Litisoni (29') 1 Dylan Coutts (43') 1 Felix Fa'atili (65') 1	Bryce Sait 3/4 (31', 44', 66')		
Team Details: FB / 1 / Jett Forbes; WG / 20 / Albert Litisoni; CE / 3 / Tre Fotu; CE / 2 / Talanoa Penitani; WG / 5 / Richard Whalebone; FE / 17 / Riley Lester; HB / 7 / Bryce Sait; PR / 8 / Lachlan Crossle; HK / 9 / Taj Brailey; PR / 16 / Lachlan Araullo; SR / 11 / Lawson Cotter (c); SR / 12 / Dylan Coutts; LK / 13 / Sam McCulloch; Interchange: IC / 4 / Jacob Taulani; IC / 10 / Felix Fa'atili; IC / 14 / Luke Raymond; IC / 18 / Harrison Hood; Concussion Substitute: RE / 15 / Samson Mairi; Reserves: RE / 6 / Dylan Christensen; Coach: / / Dave Howlett
25 March	8	St. George Illawarra Dragons	Cronulla High School, Sydney	Loss	20-26	Richard Whalebone (12', 48') 2 Talanoa Penitani (19') 1 Albert Litisoni (43') 1	Siteni Taukamo 2/2 (44', 50'); Bryce Sait 0/2		
Team Details: FB / 21 / Siteni Taukamo; WG / 2 / Albert Litisoni; CE / 3 / Tre Fotu; CE / 4 / Talanoa Penitani; WG / 5 / Richard Whalebone; FE / 6 / Dylan Christensen; HB / 7 / Bryce Sait; PR / 8 / Lachlan Crossle; HK / 17 / Harrison Hood; PR / 16 / Lachlan Araullo; SR / 11 / Lawson Cotter (c); SR / 12 / Dylan Coutts; LK / 13 / Sam McCulloch; Interchange: IC / 14 / Luke Raymond; IC / 15 / Jacob Taulani; IC / 18 / Samson Mairi; IC / 19 / Riley Lester; Concussion Substitute: RE / 20 / Nabatiku Utiaro; Reserves: RE / 1 / Jett Forbes; RE / 9 / Taj Brailey; RE / 10 / Felix Fa'atili; Coach: / / Dave Howlett
1 April	9	Illawarra Steelers	Cronulla High School, Sydney	Loss	8-30	Sam McCulloch (20') 1 Lawson Cotter (25') 1	Siteni Taukamo 0/2; Dylan Christensen 0/2		
Team Details: FB / 1 / Siteni Taukamo; WG / 2 / Albert Litisoni; CE / 20 / Nabatiku Utiaro; CE / 4 / Talanoa Penitani; WG / 5 / Richard Whalebone; FE / 6 / Dylan Christensen; HB / 18 / Osca Catton; PR / 8 / Lachlan Crossle; HK / 9 / Taj Brailey; PR / 14 / Junior Taupau; SR / 11 / Lawson Cotter (c); SR / 12 / Dylan Coutts; LK / 13 / Sam McCulloch; Interchange: IC / 10 / Felix Fa'atili; IC / 15 / Cruiz Devine; IC / 17 / Harrison Hood; IC / 19 / Jai Davies; Concussion Substitute: RE / 3 / Kobey O'Brien; Reserves: RE / 3 / Tre Fotu; RE / 7 / Bryce Sait; RE / 14 / Luke Raymond; RE / 15 / Jacob Taulani; RE / 16 / Lachlan Araullo; RE / 18 / Samson Mairi; RE / 19 / Riley Lester; Coach: / / Dave Howlett
Legend: Win Loss Draw Bye

=== Harold Matthews Cup (U17s) ===
==== Regular season ====
Date	Round	Opponent	Venue	Result	Score	Tries	Goals	Field Goals	Report
4 February	1	Balmain Tigers	Leichhardt Oval, Sydney	Win	26-6	Kailan Rehayem (2', 57') 2 Alex Challenor (39', 53') 2 Nikora Williams (43') 1	Jayze Tuigamala 3/4 (40', 55', 59'); Callum Grantham 0/1		
Team Details: FB / 1 / Callum Grantham; WG / 2 / Kailan Rehayem; CE / 3 / Nikora Williams; CE / 4 / Jayze Tuigamala; WG / 5 / Bailey Leach; FE / 6 / Blake Wardrobe; HB / 7 / Max Halloran; PR / 8 / Garylee Tohovaka; HK / 9 / Daniel Louka; PR / 10 / Lama Afu; SR / 11 / Kaden Garner; SR / 12 / Beau Watson; LK / 13 / Alex Challenor (c); Interchange: IC / 14 / Oliver Lester; IC / 15 / Tom Dellow; IC / 16 / Dylan Watkins; IC / 17 / Blake Watman; Concussion Substitute: RE / 18 / Nathaniel Xiros; Coach: / / Brad Kelly
11 February	2	North Sydney Bears	Hills Grammar, Kenthurst	Win	26-10	Kailan Rehayem (9') 1 Bailey Leach (18') 1 Nikora Williams (45') 1 Daniel Louka (51') 1 Beau Watson (58') 1	Nikora Williams 3/3 (46', 52', 59'); Jayze Tuigamala 0/2		
Team Details: FB / 1 / Oliver Lester; WG / 2 / Kailan Rehayem; CE / 3 / Nikora Williams; CE / 4 / Jayze Tuigamala; WG / 5 / Bailey Leach; FE / 6 / Blake Wardrobe; HB / 7 / Max Halloran; PR / 8 / Garylee Tohovaka; HK / 9 / Daniel Louka; PR / 10 / Lama Afu; SR / 11 / Kaden Garner; SR / 12 / Beau Watson; LK / 13 / Alex Challenor (c); Interchange: IC / 14 / Tye Bursill; IC / 15 / Tom Dellow; IC / 17 / Blake Watman; IC / 18 / Nathaniel Xiros; Concussion Substitute: RE / 19 / Zane Walker; Reserves: RE / 16 / Dylan Watkins; RE / 20 / Xavier Singh; RE / 21 / Koby Lillis; Coach: / / Brad Kelly
18 February	3	Sydney Roosters	Henson Park, Sydney	Loss	18-36	Blake Wardrobe (5') 1 Nikora Williams (8') 1 Oliver Lester (14') 1	Nikora Williams 3/3 (6', 10', 16')		
Team Details: FB / 1 / Will Stewart; WG / 2 / Oliver Lester; CE / 3 / Nikora Williams; CE / 4 / Jayze Tuigamala; WG / 5 / Xavier Singh; FE / 6 / Blake Wardrobe; HB / 7 / Taj Wever; PR / 8 / Garylee Tohovaka; HK / 9 / Daniel Louka; PR / 10 / Lama Afu; SR / 11 / Kaden Garner; SR / 12 / Beau Watson; LK / 13 / Alex Challenor (c); Interchange: IC / 14 / Zane Walker; IC / 15 / Tom Dellow; IC / 16 / Nathaniel Xiros; IC / 17 / Blake Watman; Concussion Substitute: RE / 18 / Koby Lillis; Reserves: RE / 19 / Tom Wiseman; RE / 20 / Kailan Rehayem; Coach: / / Brad Kelly
25 February	4	Central Coast Roosters	PointsBet Stadium, Sydney	Win	36-6	Xavier Singh (20', 43', 51') 3 Kaden Garner (0') 1 Kailan Rehayem (16') 1 Oliver Lester (35') 1 Nathaniel Xiros (58') 1	Nikora Williams 4/7 (2', 21', 36', 59')		
Team Details: FB / 1 / Will Stewart; WG / 20 / Kailan Rehayem; CE / 3 / Nikora Williams; CE / 19 / Tom Wiseman; WG / 5 / Xavier Singh; FE / 6 / Blake Wardrobe; HB / 2 / Oliver Lester; PR / 4 / Jayze Tuigamala; HK / 9 / Daniel Louka; PR / 10 / Nathaniel Xiros; SR / 11 / Kaden Garner; SR / 12 / Beau Watson; LK / 13 / Alex Challenor (c); Interchange: IC / 15 / Tom Dellow; IC / 16 / Natane Haunga; IC / 17 / Blake Watman; IC / 21 / Tye Bursill; Concussion Substitute: RE / 14 / Zane Walker; Reserves: RE / 7 / Taj Wever; RE / 8 / Garylee Tohovaka; RE / 18 / Koby Lillis; RE / 22 / Max Halloran; Coach: / / Brad Kelly
5 March	5	South Sydney Rabbitohs	PointsBet Stadium, Sydney	Draw	18-18	Tom Wiseman (47') 1 Tom Dellow (54') 1 Oliver Lester (59') 1	Nikora Williams 3/3 (48', 55', 60')		
Team Details: FB / 1 / Will Stewart; WG / 2 / Kailan Rehayem; CE / 3 / Nikora Williams; CE / 4 / Tom Wiseman; WG / 5 / Xavier Singh; FE / 6 / Blake Wardrobe; HB / 7 / Oliver Lester; PR / 8 / Jayze Tuigamala; HK / 9 / Daniel Louka; PR / 10 / Nathaniel Xiros; SR / 11 / Kaden Garner; SR / 12 / Beau Watson; LK / 13 / Alex Challenor (c); Interchange: IC / 14 / Tye Bursill; IC / 15 / Tom Dellow; IC / 16 / Natane Haunga; IC / 17 / Garylee Tohovaka; Concussion Substitute: RE / 18 / Zane Walker; Reserves: RE / 19 / Max Halloran; RE / 20 / Koby Lillis; RE / 21 / Blake Watman; Coach: / / Brad Kelly
	6	Bye							
18 March	7	Canberra Raiders	Raiders Belconnen, Canberra	Loss	22-26	Kailan Rehayem (18') 1 Tom Dellow (24') 1 Will Stewart (28') 1 Zane Walker (55') 1	Nikora Williams 3/4 (20', 25', 56')		
Team Details: FB / 1 / Will Stewart; WG / 2 / Kailan Rehayem; CE / 3 / Nikora Williams; CE / 4 / Tom Wiseman; WG / 5 / Xavier Singh; FE / 6 / Blake Wardrobe; HB / 7 / Oliver Lester; PR / 8 / Jayze Tuigamala; HK / 9 / Daniel Louka; PR / 10 / Garylee Tohovaka; SR / 11 / Kaden Garner; SR / 12 / Beau Watson; LK / 13 / Alex Challenor (c); Interchange: IC / 14 / Zane Walker; IC / 15 / Tom Dellow; IC / 16 / Natane Haunga; IC / 17 / Nathaniel Xiros; Concussion Substitute: RE / 18 / Tye Bursill; Reserves: RE / 19 / Max Halloran; RE / 20 / Koby Lillis; RE / 21 / Blake Watman; Coach: / / Brad Kelly
25 March	8	St. George Illawarra Dragons	Cronulla High School, Sydney	Win	14-10	Bailey Leach (1') 1 Kailan Rehayem (28') 1 Nikora Williams (30') 1	Nikora Williams 1/3 (3')		
Team Details: FB / 1 / Will Stewart; WG / 2 / Kailan Rehayem; CE / 3 / Nikora Williams; CE / 21 / Bailey Leach; WG / 5 / Xavier Singh; FE / 6 / Blake Wardrobe; HB / 7 / Oliver Lester; PR / 8 / Nathaniel Xiros; HK / 9 / Daniel Louka; PR / 10 / Garylee Tohovaka; SR / 11 / Kaden Garner; SR / 12 / Beau Watson; LK / 13 / Alex Challenor (c); Interchange: IC / 14 / Zane Walker; IC / 15 / Tom Dellow; IC / 16 / Natane Haunga; IC / 17 / Blake Watman; Concussion Substitute: RE / 18 / Tye Bursill; Reserves: RE / 4 / Tom Wiseman; RE / 19 / Max Halloran; RE / 20 / Koby Lillis; Coach: / / Brad Kelly
1 April	9	Illawarra Steelers	Cronulla High School, Sydney	Win	12-8	Oliver Lester (4') 1 Blake Wardrobe (7') 1	Nikora Williams 2/2 (5', 8')		
Team Details: FB / 1 / Will Stewart; WG / 2 / Kailan Rehayem; CE / 3 / Nikora Williams; CE / 4 / Bailey Leach; WG / 5 / Xavier Singh; FE / 6 / Blake Wardrobe; HB / 7 / Oliver Lester; PR / 8 / Jayze Tuigamala; HK / 9 / Tye Bursill; PR / 10 / Garylee Tohovaka; SR / 11 / Kaden Garner; SR / 12 / Beau Watson; LK / 13 / Alex Challenor (c); Interchange: IC / 14 / Zane Walker; IC / 15 / Tom Dellow; IC / 16 / Natane Haunga; IC / 17 / Nathaniel Xiros; Concussion Substitute: RE / 18 / Blake Watman; Reserves: RE / 19 / Max Halloran; RE / 20 / Koby Lillis; RE / 21 / Dallas Blackburn-Kingi; RE / 22 / Tom Wiseman; Coach: / / Brad Kelly
Legend: Win Loss Draw Bye

==== Finals series ====
Date	Round	Opponent	Venue	Result	Score	Tries	Goals	Field Goals	Report
15 April	1	Parramatta Eels	Campbelltown Sports Stadium, Sydney	Loss	4-18	Xavier Singh (17') 1	Nikora Williams 0/1		
Team Details: FB / 1 / Will Stewart; WG / 2 / Kailan Rehayem; CE / 3 / Nikora Williams; CE / 4 / Bailey Leach; WG / 5 / Xavier Singh; FE / 6 / Blake Wardrobe; HB / 7 / Oliver Lester; PR / 8 / Jayze Tuigamala; HK / 9 / Daniel Louka; PR / 10 / Garylee Tohovaka; SR / 11 / Kaden Garner; SR / 12 / Beau Watson; LK / 13 / Alex Challenor (c); Interchange: IC / 14 / Zane Walker; IC / 15 / Tom Dellow; IC / 16 / Natane Haunga; IC / 17 / Blake Watman; Concussion Substitute: RE / 18 / Tye Bursill; Reserves: RE / 19 / Max Halloran; RE / 20 / Koby Lillis; RE / 21 / Nathaniel Xiros; RE / 22 / Tom Wiseman; Coach: / / Brad Kelly
Legend: Win Loss Draw Bye

=== Tarsha Gale Cup (U19s) ===
==== Regular season ====
Date	Round	Opponent	Venue	Result	Score	Tries	Goals	Field Goals	Report
	1	Bye							
11 February	2	North Sydney Bears	Hills Grammar, Kenthurst	Draw	10-10	Mercydes Metcalf (37') 1 Sage Gray (50') 1	Angie Tucker 1/2 (38')		
Team Details: FB / 1 / Tia-Jordyn Vasilovski; WG / 2 / Tess Robinson; CE / 3 / Kelsey Wilson; CE / 4 / Sage Gray; WG / 5 / Katalina Veikoso; FE / 6 / Olivia Herman; HB / 7 / Angie Tucker; PR / 8 / Ariana Harden; HK / 9 / Bianca Cutrupi; PR / 10 / Laura Came; SR / 11 / Ava Cahill; SR / 12 / Charlotte Boyle; LK / 13 / Stephanie Faulkner; Interchange: IC / 14 / Sereena Moussa; IC / 16 / Alena Pale Eli; IC / 17 / Kalolaine Veikoso; IC / 21 / Mercydes Metcalf; Concussion Substitute: RE / 19 / Raphaela Stojoski; Reserves: RE / 15 / Summer Hoban; RE / 18 / Lailah Sheridan; RE / 20 / Zoe Topham; Coach: / / Neil Stanley
18 February	3	Indigenous Academy	Henson Park, Sydney	Loss	4-34	Zoe Topham (13') 1	Alena Pale Eli 0/1		
Team Details: FB / 1 / Tia-Jordyn Vasilovski; WG / 2 / Zoe Topham; CE / 3 / Kelsey Wilson; CE / 4 / Sage Gray; WG / 5 / Katalina Veikoso; FE / 6 / Olivia Herman; HB / 7 / Angie Tucker; PR / 8 / Ariana Harden; HK / 9 / Bianca Cutrupi; PR / 10 / Alena Pale Eli; SR / 11 / Ava Cahill; SR / 12 / Charlotte Boyle; LK / 13 / Stephanie Faulkner; Interchange: IC / 14 / Sereena Moussa; IC / 15 / Mercydes Metcalf; IC / 16 / Summer Hoban; IC / 17 / Kalolaine Veikoso; Concussion Substitute: RE / 19 / Lailah Sheridan; Reserves: RE / 18 / Raphaela Stojoski; RE / 20 / Zali O'Brien; RE / 21 / Tess Robinson; Coach: / / Neil Stanley
25 February	4	St. George Dragons	PointsBet Stadium, Sydney	Loss	12-20	Raphaela Stojoski (36') 1 Tia-Jordyn Vasilovski (46') 1 Kalolaine Veikoso (51') 1	Alena Pale Eli 0/3		
Team Details: FB / 1 / Tia-Jordyn Vasilovski; WG / 18 / Raphaela Stojoski; CE / 3 / Kelsey Wilson; CE / 2 / Lailah Sheridan; WG / 5 / Katalina Veikoso; FE / 6 / Olivia Herman; HB / 7 / Angie Tucker; PR / 15 / Mercydes Metcalf; HK / 9 / Bianca Cutrupi; PR / 10 / Alena Pale Eli; SR / 4 / Sage Gray; SR / 12 / Charlotte Boyle; LK / 13 / Stephanie Faulkner; Interchange: IC / 11 / Kalolaine Veikoso; IC / 14 / Sereena Moussa; IC / 16 / Summer Hoban; IC / 17 / Laura Came; Concussion Substitute: RE / 19 / Ava Cahill; Reserves: RE / 8 / Ariana Harden; RE / 20 / Zoe Topham; RE / 21 / Tess Robinson; Coach: / / Neil Stanley
4 March	5	South Sydney Rabbitohs	Cronulla High School, Sydney	Win	20-10	Ava Cahill (14') 1 Brooke Elliott (47') 1 Sereena Moussa (53') 1 Alena Pale Eli (58') 1	Brooke Elliott 2/3 (55', 59'); Olivia Herman 0/1		
Team Details: FB / 3 / Kelsey Wilson; WG / 2 / Raphaela Stojoski; CE / 16 / Sage Gray; CE / 4 / Lailah Sheridan; WG / 5 / Katalina Veikoso; FE / 6 / Olivia Herman; HB / 7 / Angie Tucker; PR / 8 / Laura Came; HK / 9 / Bianca Cutrupi; PR / 10 / Alena Pale Eli; SR / 11 / Ava Cahill; SR / 12 / Kalolaine Veikoso; LK / 13 / Stephanie Faulkner; Interchange: IC / 14 / Sereena Moussa; IC / 15 / Summer Hoban; IC / 17 / Brooke Elliott; IC / 19 / Zoe Topham; Concussion Substitute: RE / 20 / Rylea Harris; Reserves: RE / 1 / Tia-Jordyn Vasilovski; RE / 19 / Tess Robinson; Coach: / / Neil Stanley
11 March	6	Parramatta Eels	New Era Stadium, Sydney	Win	22-16	Katalina Veikoso (8', 13', 57') 3 Stephanie Faulkner (51') 1	Olivia Herman 2/3 (53', 58'); Angie Tucker 1/1 (10')		
Team Details: FB / 1 / Kelsey Wilson; WG / 2 / Raphaela Stojoski; CE / 3 / Lailah Sheridan; CE / 4 / Brooke Elliott; WG / 5 / Katalina Veikoso; FE / 6 / Olivia Herman; HB / 7 / Angie Tucker; PR / 8 / Laura Came; HK / 9 / Bianca Cutrupi; PR / 10 / Alena Pale Eli; SR / 11 / Ava Cahill; SR / 12 / Kalolaine Veikoso; LK / 13 / Stephanie Faulkner; Interchange: IC / 14 / Sereena Moussa; IC / 15 / Summer Hoban; IC / 16 / Sage Gray; IC / 17 / Ariana Harden; Concussion Substitute: RE / 19 / Zoe Topham; Reserves: RE / 18 / Rylea Harris; RE / 19 / Tess Robinson; Coach: / / Neil Stanley
18 March	7	Canberra Raiders	Raiders Belconnen, Canberra	Loss	6-22	Ariana Harden (51') 1	Olivia Herman 1/1 (52')		
Team Details: FB / 1 / Kelsey Wilson; WG / 2 / Raphaela Stojoski; CE / 3 / Lailah Sheridan; CE / 4 / Sage Gray; WG / 5 / Katalina Veikoso; FE / 6 / Olivia Herman; HB / 7 / Angie Tucker (c); PR / 8 / Laura Came; HK / 9 / Bianca Cutrupi; PR / 10 / Alena Pale Eli; SR / 11 / Ava Cahill; SR / 12 / Kalolaine Veikoso; LK / 13 / Stephanie Faulkner; Interchange: IC / 14 / Sereena Moussa; IC / 15 / Summer Hoban; IC / 17 / Ariana Harden; IC / 19 / Zoe Topham; Concussion Substitute: RE / 20 / Rylea Harris; Reserves: RE / 18 / Tia-Jordyn Vasilovski; Coach: / / Neil Stanley
26 March	8	Canterbury-Bankstown Bulldogs	Cronulla High School, Sydney	Loss	0-56				
Team Details: FB / 1 / Tia-Jordyn Vasilovski; WG / 2 / Raphaela Stojoski; CE / 3 / Kelsey Wilson; CE / 4 / Katalina Veikoso; WG / 5 / Lailah Sheridan; FE / 6 / Olivia Herman; HB / 7 / Angie Tucker (c); PR / 8 / Ariana Harden; HK / 9 / Bianca Cutrupi; PR / 16 / Alena Pale Ali; SR / 11 / Charlotte Boyle; SR / 12 / Sage Gray; LK / 13 / Stephanie Faulkner; Interchange: IC / 14 / Sereena Moussa; IC / 18 / Ava Cahill; IC / 19 / Zoe Topham; IC / 22 / Brooke Elliott; Concussion Substitute: RE / 15 / Summer Hoban; Reserves: RE / 10 / Laura Came; RE / 20 / Rylea Harris; RE / 21 / Mercydes Metcalf; Coach: / / Neil Stanley
1 April	9	Illawarra Steelers	Cronulla High School, Sydney	Win	10-4	Tia-Jordyn Vasilovski (5', 58') 2	Brooke Elliott 1/1 (58'); Olivia Herman 0/1		
Team Details: FB / 1 / Tia-Jordyn Vasilovski; WG / 2 / Raphaela Stojoski; CE / 5 / Lailah Sheridan; CE / 4 / Katalina Veikoso; WG / 19 / Zoe Topham; FE / 6 / Olivia Herman; HB / 7 / Angie Tucker (c); PR / 8 / Ariana Harden; HK / 14 / Sereena Moussa; PR / 10 / Alena Pale Eli; SR / 13 / Stephanie Faulkner; SR / 12 / Sage Gray; LK / 9 / Bianca Cutrupi; Interchange: IC / 15 / Summer Hoban; IC / 16 / Mercydes Metcalf; IC / 20 / Rylea Harris; IC / 22 / Brooke Elliott; Reserves: RE / 11 / Charlotte Boyle; Coach: / / Neil Stanley
Legend: Win Loss Draw Bye

== Awards ==
=== 2023 Dally M Awards ===
- Provan-Summons Medal: Nicho Hynes
- NRLW Rookie of the Year: Annessa Biddle

=== Sharks Awards Night ===
Held at Doltone House, Sylvania Waters, Sydney on Thursday, 14 September.

- Porter Gallen Medal and Pontifex Player of the Year: Blayke Brailey
- Porter Gallen Nominees: Blayke Brailey, William Kennedy, Sione Katoa, Cameron McInnes & Briton Nikora
- NRLW Player of the Year: Tiana Penitani
- Tommy Bishop Players Player: Blayke Brailey
- NRLW Player's Player: Annessa Biddle
- Steve Rogers Rookie of the Year: Thomas Hazelton
- Members Player of the Year: William Kennedy
- Sharks Have Heart Community Award: Toby Rudolf (NRL) & Jada Taylor (NRLW)
- Iron Man: Blayke Brailey, Briton Nikora, Sione Katoa, Jesse Ramien
- Andrew Ettingshausen Club Person of the Year: Jess Adams
- Education Excellence: Samuel Stonestreet (NRL), Andie Robinson (NRLW) & Kristian Dixon (Jersey Flegg)
- Jersey Flegg – Gavin Miller Player of the Year: Blake Hosking
- Jersey Flegg – Greg Pierce Players Player: Noah Lester

=== Women's Awards Night ===
Held at Sharks at Kareela, Sydney on Tuesday, 27 June.

- Female Pathways Player of the Year: Stephanie Faulkner
- Tarsha Gale Coaches Award: Stephanie Faulkner
- Tarsha Gale Player's Player of the Year: Bianca Cutrupi
- Harvey Norman Women's Premiership Coaches Award: Quincy Dodd
- Harvey Norman Women's Premiership Player's Player of the Year: Ellie Johnston

=== Junior Rep Awards Night ===
Held at Sharks at Kareela, Sydney on Wednesday, 10 May.

- Junior Rep Player of the Year: Alex Challenor
- Harold Matthews Cup Player of the Year: Alex Challenor
- Harold Matthews Cup Coaches Award: Thomas Dellow
- SG Ball Player of the Year: Sam McCulloch
- SG Ball Coaches Award: Lachlan Crossle

=== Other awards ===
- Preston Campbell Medal: Nicho Hynes
