= 2021 Cronulla-Sutherland Sharks season =

- NRL Rank: 9th
- 2021 record: Wins: 10; draws: 0; losses: 14
- Points scored: For: 520; against: 556

Team information
- CEO: Dino Mezzatesta
- Coach: John Morris → Josh Hannay (interim)
- Assistant coach: Dave Howlett; Daniel Holdsworth
- Captain: Wade Graham (11 games) Aaron Woods (13 games)
- Stadium: Netstrata Jubilee Stadium (6 games); Suncorp Stadium (3 games); C.ex Coffs International Stadium (1 game); Moreton Daily Stadium (1 game); Cbus Super Stadium (1 game)

Top scorers
- Tries: William Kennedy & Connor Tracey (14)
- Goals: Braydon Trindall (36)
- Points: Braydon Trindall (88)
← 2020	2022 →

The 2021 Cronulla-Sutherland Sharks season was the 55th in the club's history. The club was coached by Josh Hannay in an interim role and captained by Wade Graham. The team was initially coached by John Morris, who was relinquished of his duties following the signing of Craig Fitzgibbon as coach for the 2022 NRL season. The team competed in the National Rugby League's 2021 Telstra Premiership.

== Milestones ==
- Round 1: Aaron Woods played his 50th game for the club.
- Round 1: Aiden Tolman made his debut for the club, after previously playing for the Canterbury-Bankstown Bulldogs.
- Round 2: Wade Graham played his 250th career game.
- Round 4: Teig Wilton scored his 1st career try.
- Round 6: Braden Hamlin-Uele played his 50th career game.
- Round 8: Will Chambers made his debut for the club, after previously playing for the Melbourne Storm.
- Round 9: Matt Moylan played his 50th game for the club.
- Round 12: Shaun Johnson played his 200th career game.
- Round 12: Briton Nikora played his 50th career and club game.
- Round 12: Franklin Pele made his NRL debut for the club.
- Round 15: Will Chambers scored his 1st try for the club.
- Round 16: Aiden Tolman scored his 1st try for the club.
- Round 17: Braydon Trindall scored his 1st career try.
- Round 19: Toby Rudolf scored his 1st career try.
- Round 20: Luke Metcalf made his NRL debut for the club.
- Round 23: Luke Metcalf scored his 1st career try.

== Fixtures ==
=== Pre-season ===
Date	Round	Opponent	Venue	Result	Score	Tries	Goals	Field Goals	Report
13 February	Trial Match	St. George Illawarra Dragons	Shark Park, Sydney	Win	36-28	Macdonald (2), Iro, Wilton, Trindall, Hiroti, Metcalf	Trindall 4/5, Hiroti 0/2		
Team Details: FB / 1 / Luke Metcalf; WG / 2 / Nene Macdonald; CE / 3 / Mawene Hiroti; CE / 4 / Kayleb Milne; WG / 5 / Kayal Iro; FE / 6 / Jack A Williams; HB / 7 / Braydon Trindall; PR / 8 / Franklin Pele; HK / 9 / Kyle Paterson; PR / 10 / Daniel Vasquez; SR / 11 / Teig Wilton; SR / 12 / Josh Carr; LK / 13 / Billy Magoulias; Interchange: IC / 14 / Monty Raper; IC / 15 / Tom Hazelton; IC / 16 / Jack Martin; IC / 17 / Kade Dykes; IC / 18 / Ryan Rivett; IC / 19 / Jordan Samrani; IC / 20 / Addison Demetriou; IC / 21 / Gabe Hamlin; IC / 22 / Josh Finau; IC / 24 / Kyle Pickering
27 February	Trial Match	Canterbury-Bankstown Bulldogs	Netstrata Jubilee Stadium, Sydney	Loss	12-16	Mulitalo (2)	Townsend 2/2		
Team Details: FB / 1 / William Kennedy; WG / 2 / Sione Katoa; CE / 3 / Josh Dugan; CE / 4 / Jesse Ramien; WG / 5 / Ronaldo Mulitalo; FE / 6 / Matt Moylan; HB / 7 / Chad Townsend; PR / 8 / Braden Hamlin-Uele; HK / 9 / Blayke Brailey; PR / 10 / Aaron Woods; SR / 11 / Briton Nikora; SR / 12 / Wade Graham; LK / 13 / Billy Magoulias; Interchange: IC / 14 / Connor Tracey; IC / 15 / Jack Williams; IC / 16 / Teig Wilton; IC / 17 / Andrew Fifita; IC / 18 / Luke Metcalf; IC / 19 / Mawene Hiroti; IC / 20 / Braydon Trindall; IC / 21 / Nene Macdonald; IC / 22 / Franklin Pele; IC / 23 / Kayleb Milne
Legend: Win Loss Draw Bye

=== Regular season ===
Date	Round	Opponent	Venue	Result	Score	Tries	Goals	Field Goals	Report
14 March	1	St. George Illawarra Dragons	Netstrata Jubilee Stadium, Sydney	Win	32-18	Kennedy (2), Dugan, Mulitalo, Woods	Townsend 6/6	Moylan 0/1, Townsend 0/1	
Team Details: FB / 1 / William Kennedy; WG / 2 / Sione Katoa; CE / 3 / Josh Dugan; CE / 4 / Jesse Ramien; WG / 5 / Ronaldo Mulitalo; FE / 6 / Matt Moylan; HB / 7 / Chad Townsend; PR / 8 / Braden Hamlin-Uele; HK / 9 / Blayke Brailey; PR / 10 / Aaron Woods; SR / 11 / Briton Nikora; SR / 12 / Wade Graham (c); LK / 13 / Toby Rudolf; Interchange: IC / 14 / Connor Tracey; IC / 15 / Aiden Tolman; IC / 16 / Jack Williams; IC / 17 / Billy Magoulias; Reserves: RE / 18 / Mawene Hiroti; RE / 19 / Teig Wilton; RE / 20 / Andrew Fifita; RE / 21 / Braydon Trindall
21 March	2	Canberra Raiders	Netstrata Jubilee Stadium, Sydney	Loss	10-12	Kennedy, Dugan	Townsend 1/4	Moylan 0/1	
Team Details: FB / 1 / William Kennedy; WG / 2 / Sione Katoa; CE / 3 / Josh Dugan; CE / 4 / Mawene Hiroti; WG / 5 / Ronaldo Mulitalo; FE / 6 / Matt Moylan; HB / 7 / Chad Townsend; PR / 8 / Braden Hamlin-Uele; HK / 9 / Blayke Brailey; PR / 10 / Aaron Woods; SR / 11 / Briton Nikora; SR / 12 / Wade Graham (c); LK / 13 / Toby Rudolf; Interchange: IC / 14 / Connor Tracey; IC / 15 / Aiden Tolman; IC / 16 / Jack Williams; IC / 17 / Billy Magoulias; Reserves: RE / 18 / Nene Macdonald; RE / 19 / Teig Wilton; RE / 20 / Andrew Fifita; RE / 21 / Braydon Trindall
27 March	3	Parramatta Eels	Bankwest Stadium, Sydney	Loss	4-28	Katoa	Townsend 0/1		
Team Details: FB / 1 / William Kennedy; WG / 2 / Sione Katoa; CE / 3 / Josh Dugan; CE / 4 / Connor Tracey; WG / 5 / Ronaldo Mulitalo; FE / 6 / Matt Moylan; HB / 7 / Chad Townsend; PR / 8 / Braden Hamlin-Uele; HK / 9 / Blayke Brailey; PR / 10 / Aaron Woods; SR / 11 / Briton Nikora; SR / 12 / Wade Graham (c); LK / 13 / Toby Rudolf; Interchange: IC / 14 / Teig Wilton; IC / 15 / Aiden Tolman; IC / 16 / Jack Williams; IC / 17 / Billy Magoulias; Reserves: RE / 18 / Mawene Hiroti; RE / 19 / Nene Macdonald; RE / 20 / Andrew Fifita; RE / 21 / Braydon Trindall
3 April	4	North Queensland Cowboys	Netstrata Jubilee Stadium, Sydney	Win	48-10	Tracey (2), Kennedy (2), Hiroti, Dugan, Moylan, Wilton	Townsend 8/8		
Team Details: FB / 1 / William Kennedy; WG / 2 / Mawene Hiroti; CE / 3 / Josh Dugan; CE / 4 / Connor Tracey; WG / 5 / Ronaldo Mulitalo; FE / 6 / Matt Moylan; HB / 7 / Chad Townsend; PR / 8 / Braden Hamlin-Uele; HK / 9 / Blayke Brailey; PR / 10 / Aaron Woods; SR / 11 / Teig Wilton; SR / 12 / Wade Graham (c); LK / 13 / Toby Rudolf; Interchange: IC / 14 / Braydon Trindall; IC / 15 / Aiden Tolman; IC / 16 / Jack Williams; IC / 17 / Billy Magoulias; Reserves: RE / 18 / Franklin Pele; RE / 19 / Nene Macdonald; RE / 20 / Andrew Fifita; RE / 21 / Jensen Taumoepeau
Due to the COVID situation in south-east Queensland, the match between the Sharks and the Cowboys was relocated to Netstrata Jubilee Stadium. The match was originally set to take place at Sunshine Coast Stadium, Sunshine Coast.
10 April	5	Sydney Roosters	Central Coast Stadium, Central Coast	Loss	18-26	Hiroti, Kennedy, Williams	Townsend 3/4		
Team Details: FB / 1 / William Kennedy; WG / 2 / Mawene Hiroti; CE / 3 / Josh Dugan; CE / 4 / Jesse Ramien; WG / 5 / Ronaldo Mulitalo; FE / 6 / Matt Moylan; HB / 7 / Chad Townsend; PR / 8 / Braden Hamlin-Uele; HK / 9 / Blayke Brailey; PR / 10 / Aaron Woods; SR / 11 / Teig Wilton; SR / 12 / Wade Graham (c); LK / 13 / Toby Rudolf; Interchange: IC / 14 / Connor Tracey; IC / 15 / Aiden Tolman; IC / 16 / Jack Williams; IC / 17 / Billy Magoulias; Concussion Substitute: RE / 18 / Braydon Trindall; Reserves: RE / 19 / Nene Macdonald; RE / 20 / Andrew Fifita; RE / 21 / Franklin Pele
16 April	6	Newcastle Knights	McDonald Jones Stadium, Newcastle	Loss	22-26	Ramien, Nikora, Tracey, Hiroti	Townsend 3/4		
Team Details: FB / 1 / William Kennedy; WG / 2 / Mawene Hiroti; CE / 4 / Jesse Ramien; CE / 12 / Teig Wilton; WG / 3 / Connor Tracey; FE / 6 / Matt Moylan; HB / 7 / Chad Townsend; PR / 8 / Braden Hamlin-Uele; HK / 9 / Blayke Brailey; PR / 10 / Aaron Woods (c); SR / 11 / Briton Nikora; SR / 16 / Jack Williams; LK / 13 / Toby Rudolf; Interchange: IC / 14 / Billy Magoulias; IC / 15 / Aiden Tolman; IC / 17 / Siosifa Talakai; IC / 18 / Braydon Trindall (DNP); Concussion Substitute: RE / 20 / Franklin Pele; Reserves: RE / 5 / Ronaldo Mulitalo; RE / 19 / Nene Macdonald; RE / 21 / Jensen Taumoepeau
24 April	7	Canterbury-Bankstown Bulldogs	Netstrata Jubilee Stadium, Sydney	Loss	12-18	Brailey, Hiroti	Townsend 2/2		
Team Details: FB / 1 / William Kennedy; WG / 2 / Mawene Hiroti; CE / 3 / Josh Dugan; CE / 4 / Jesse Ramien; WG / 5 / Connor Tracey; FE / 15 / Shaun Johnson; HB / 7 / Chad Townsend; PR / 8 / Braden Hamlin-Uele; HK / 9 / Blayke Brailey; PR / 10 / Aaron Woods (c); SR / 11 / Briton Nikora; SR / 12 / Teig Wilton; LK / 13 / Toby Rudolf; Interchange: IC / 14 / Billy Magoulias; IC / 16 / Jack Williams; IC / 17 / Siosifa Talakai; IC / 18 / Braydon Trindall; Concussion Substitute: RE / 20 / Franklin Pele; Reserves: RE / 6 / Matt Moylan; RE / 19 / Will Chambers; RE / 21 / Jensen Taumoepeau
30 April	8	Melbourne Storm	AAMI Park, Melbourne	Loss	14-40	Nikora, Tracey	Townsend 2/3		
Team Details: FB / 1 / William Kennedy; WG / 2 / Mawene Hiroti; CE / 3 / Will Chambers; CE / 14 / Teig Wilton; WG / 5 / Connor Tracey; FE / 6 / Shaun Johnson; HB / 7 / Chad Townsend; PR / 8 / Aiden Tolman; HK / 9 / Blayke Brailey; PR / 10 / Aaron Woods; SR / 11 / Briton Nikora; SR / 12 / Wade Graham (c); LK / 13 / Toby Rudolf; Interchange: IC / 15 / Braydon Trindall; IC / 16 / Jack Williams; IC / 17 / Braden Hamlin-Uele; IC / 19 / Billy Magoulias; Concussion Substitute: RE / 21 / Josh Dugan; Reserves: RE / 4 / Jesse Ramien; RE / 18 / Matt Moylan; RE / 20 / Franklin Pele
7 May	9	Penrith Panthers	BlueBet Stadium, Sydney	Loss	0-48				
Team Details: FB / 1 / William Kennedy; WG / 2 / Mawene Hiroti; CE / 3 / Will Chambers; CE / 4 / Jesse Ramien; WG / 5 / Connor Tracey; FE / 6 / Shaun Johnson; HB / 7 / Chad Townsend; PR / 8 / Aiden Tolman; HK / 9 / Blayke Brailey; PR / 10 / Aaron Woods; SR / 11 / Briton Nikora; SR / 12 / Wade Graham (c); LK / 13 / Toby Rudolf; Interchange: IC / 15 / Teig Wilton; IC / 16 / Jack Williams; IC / 17 / Billy Magoulias; IC / 18 / Matt Moylan; Concussion Substitute: RE / 19 / Josh Dugan; Reserves: RE / 14 / Braydon Trindall; RE / 20 / Franklin Pele; RE / 21 / Jensen Taumoepeau
15 May	10	South Sydney Rabbitohs	Suncorp Stadium, Brisbane	Loss	22-32	Kennedy, Woods, Nikora, Hiroti	Townsend 3/4		
Team Details: FB / 1 / William Kennedy; WG / 2 / Mawene Hiroti; CE / 3 / Josh Dugan; CE / 4 / Will Chambers; WG / 5 / Connor Tracey; FE / 14 / Matt Moylan; HB / 7 / Chad Townsend; PR / 8 / Aiden Tolman; HK / 9 / Blayke Brailey; PR / 10 / Aaron Woods; SR / 11 / Briton Nikora; SR / 12 / Wade Graham (c); LK / 13 / Toby Rudolf; Interchange: IC / 15 / Teig Wilton (DNP); IC / 16 / Jack Williams; IC / 17 / Andrew Fifita; IC / 18 / Braydon Trindall; Concussion Substitute: RE / 19 / Billy Magoulias; Reserves: RE / 6 / Shaun Johnson; RE / 20 / Franklin Pele; RE / 21 / Jensen Taumoepeau
21 May	11	St. George Illawarra Dragons	Netstrata Jubilee Stadium, Sydney	Win	13-12	Tracey, Kennedy	Townsend 2/2	Townsend 1/3	
Team Details: FB / 1 / William Kennedy; WG / 2 / Mawene Hiroti; CE / 3 / Josh Dugan; CE / 4 / Will Chambers; WG / 5 / Connor Tracey; FE / 6 / Matt Moylan; HB / 7 / Chad Townsend; PR / 8 / Aiden Tolman; HK / 9 / Blayke Brailey; PR / 10 / Aaron Woods; SR / 11 / Briton Nikora; SR / 12 / Wade Graham (c); LK / 13 / Toby Rudolf; Interchange: IC / 14 / Braydon Trindall; IC / 15 / Teig Wilton; IC / 16 / Jack Williams; IC / 19 / Billy Magoulias (DNP); Concussion Substitute: RE / 20 / Franklin Pele; Reserves: RE / 17 / Andrew Fifita; RE / 18 / Shaun Johnson; RE / 21 / Jensen Taumoepeau
30 May	12	Gold Coast Titans	C.ex Coffs International Stadium, Coffs Harbour	Win	38-10	Mulitalo, Ramien, Williams, Brailey, Tracey	Johnson 7/7		
Team Details: FB / 1 / William Kennedy; WG / 2 / Connor Tracey; CE / 3 / Will Chambers; CE / 4 / Jesse Ramien; WG / 5 / Ronaldo Mulitalo; FE / 6 / Matt Moylan; HB / 7 / Shaun Johnson; PR / 8 / Aiden Tolman; HK / 9 / Blayke Brailey; PR / 10 / Aaron Woods; SR / 11 / Briton Nikora; SR / 12 / Wade Graham (c); LK / 13 / Toby Rudolf; Interchange: IC / 14 / Braydon Trindall; IC / 15 / Siosifa Talakai; IC / 16 / Jack Williams; IC / 20 / Franklin Pele; Concussion Substitute: RE / 19 / Billy Magoulias; Reserves: RE / 17 / Andrew Fifita; RE / 18 / Chad Townsend; RE / 21 / Jensen Taumoepeau
	13	Bye							
11 June	14	Penrith Panthers	Netstrata Jubilee Stadium, Sydney	Win	19-18	Moylan, Johnson, Mulitalo	Johnson 3/5	Johnson 1/1	
Team Details: FB / 1 / William Kennedy; WG / 2 / Connor Tracey; CE / 3 / Will Chambers; CE / 4 / Jesse Ramien; WG / 5 / Ronaldo Mulitalo; FE / 6 / Matt Moylan; HB / 7 / Shaun Johnson; PR / 8 / Aiden Tolman; HK / 9 / Blayke Brailey; PR / 10 / Aaron Woods; SR / 11 / Briton Nikora; SR / 12 / Wade Graham (c); LK / 13 / Toby Rudolf; Interchange: IC / 14 / Braydon Trindall; IC / 15 / Siosifa Talakai; IC / 16 / Jack Williams; IC / 17 / Andrew Fifita; Concussion Substitute: RE / 18 / Teig Wilton; Reserves: RE / 19 / Chad Townsend; RE / 20 / Franklin Pele; RE / 21 / Mawene Hiroti
18 June	15	North Queensland Cowboys	Queensland Country Bank Stadium, Townsville	Win	26-24	Tracey, Woods, Mulitalo, Chambers	Johnson 5/5		
Team Details: FB / 1 / William Kennedy; WG / 2 / Connor Tracey; CE / 3 / Will Chambers; CE / 4 / Jesse Ramien; WG / 5 / Ronaldo Mulitalo; FE / 6 / Matt Moylan; HB / 7 / Shaun Johnson; PR / 8 / Aiden Tolman; HK / 9 / Blayke Brailey; PR / 10 / Aaron Woods (c); SR / 11 / Briton Nikora; SR / 12 / Siosifa Talakai; LK / 13 / Toby Rudolf; Interchange: IC / 14 / Braydon Trindall; IC / 15 / Teig Wilton; IC / 16 / Jack Williams; IC / 20 / Braden Hamlin-Uele; Concussion Substitute: RE / 24 / Billy Magoulias; Reserves: RE / 17 / Andrew Fifita; RE / 19 / Chad Townsend; RE / 21 / Sione Katoa
4 July	16	Brisbane Broncos	Suncorp Stadium, Brisbane	Loss	18-26	Tracey (2), Tolman	Johnson 3/3		
Team Details: FB / 1 / William Kennedy; WG / 5 / Ronaldo Mulitalo; CE / 2 / Connor Tracey; CE / 4 / Jesse Ramien; WG / 19 / Sione Katoa; FE / 14 / Braydon Trindall; HB / 7 / Shaun Johnson; PR / 8 / Aiden Tolman; HK / 9 / Blayke Brailey; PR / 10 / Aaron Woods (c); SR / 11 / Briton Nikora; SR / 15 / Teig Wilton; LK / 13 / Toby Rudolf; Interchange: IC / 12 / Siosifa Talakai; IC / 16 / Jack Williams; IC / 17 / Braden Hamlin-Uele; IC / 21 / Mawene Hiroti (DNP); Concussion Substitute: RE / 18 / Billy Magoulias; Reserves: RE / 3 / Will Chambers; RE / 6 / Matt Moylan; RE / 20 / Andrew Fifita
11 July	17	New Zealand Warriors	Netstrata Jubilee Stadium, Sydney	Win	20-12	Tracey, Trindall, Hamlin-Uele	Trindall 4/4		
Team Details: FB / 1 / William Kennedy; WG / 2 / Sione Katoa; CE / 4 / Jesse Ramien; CE / 6 / Connor Tracey; WG / 5 / Ronaldo Mulitalo; FE / 14 / Braydon Trindall; HB / 7 / Shaun Johnson; PR / 8 / Aiden Tolman; HK / 9 / Blayke Brailey; PR / 10 / Aaron Woods (c); SR / 12 / Teig Wilton; SR / 15 / Siosifa Talakai; LK / 13 / Toby Rudolf; Interchange: IC / 11 / Briton Nikora; IC / 16 / Jack Williams; IC / 17 / Braden Hamlin-Uele; IC / 19 / Mawene Hiroti; Concussion Substitute: RE / 21 / Luke Metcalf; Reserves: RE / 3 / Will Chambers; RE / 18 / Billy Magoulias; RE / 20 / Andrew Fifita
After Round 17, the ARL Commission relocated NSW and ACT-based teams to south-east Queensland in the wake of Sydney's COVID outbreak, resulting in venue changes potentially for the rest of the season.
17 July	18	Canberra Raiders	Cbus Super Stadium, Gold Coast	Loss	18-34	Ramien, Katoa, Mulitalo	Trindall 3/3		
Team Details: FB / 1 / William Kennedy; WG / 2 / Sione Katoa; CE / 3 / Connor Tracey; CE / 4 / Jesse Ramien; WG / 5 / Ronaldo Mulitalo; FE / 6 / Braydon Trindall; HB / 7 / Shaun Johnson; PR / 8 / Aiden Tolman; HK / 9 / Blayke Brailey; PR / 10 / Aaron Woods (c); SR / 12 / Teig Wilton; SR / 15 / Siosifa Talakai; LK / 13 / Toby Rudolf; Interchange: IC / 11 / Briton Nikora; IC / 14 / Mawene Hiroti; IC / 16 / Jack Williams; IC / 17 / Braden Hamlin-Uele; Concussion Substitute: RE / 19 / Royce Hunt; Reserves: RE / 18 / Billy Magoulias; RE / 20 / Andrew Fifita; RE / 21 / Luke Metcalf
25 July	19	Canterbury-Bankstown Bulldogs	Cbus Super Stadium, Gold Coast	Win	44-24	Katoa (2), Mulitalo, Kennedy, Talakai, Rudolf, Tracey	Trindall 8/9		
Team Details: FB / 1 / William Kennedy; WG / 2 / Sione Katoa; CE / 3 / Connor Tracey; CE / 4 / Jesse Ramien; WG / 5 / Ronaldo Mulitalo; FE / 6 / Braydon Trindall; HB / 7 / Shaun Johnson; PR / 8 / Toby Rudolf; HK / 9 / Blayke Brailey; PR / 10 / Aaron Woods (c); SR / 11 / Siosifa Talakai; SR / 16 / Briton Nikora; LK / 13 / Jack Williams; Interchange: IC / 14 / Mawene Hiroti; IC / 15 / Royce Hunt; IC / 17 / Braden Hamlin-Uele; IC / 20 / Andrew Fifita; Concussion Substitute: RE / 18 / Billy Magoulias; Reserves: RE / 12 / Teig Wilton; RE / 19 / Luke Metcalf; RE / 21 / Jonaiah Lualua
2 August	20	Manly Sea Eagles	Suncorp Stadium, Brisbane	Loss	22-40	Kennedy (2), Trindall (2)	Trindall 3/4		
Team Details: FB / 1 / William Kennedy; WG / 2 / Sione Katoa; CE / 3 / Will Chambers; CE / 12 / Siosifa Talakai; WG / 5 / Ronaldo Mulitalo; FE / 6 / Connor Tracey; HB / 7 / Braydon Trindall; PR / 8 / Aiden Tolman; HK / 9 / Blayke Brailey; PR / 10 / Aaron Woods (c); SR / 11 / Briton Nikora; SR / 16 / Jack Williams; LK / 13 / Toby Rudolf; Interchange: IC / 14 / Braden Hamlin-Uele; IC / 15 / Royce Hunt; IC / 17 / Andrew Fifita; IC / 19 / Luke Metcalf; Concussion Substitute: RE / 20 / Billy Magoulias; Reserves: RE / 4 / Jesse Ramien; RE / 18 / Matt Moylan; RE / 21 / Jonaiah Lualua
Due to the Queensland government's decision to implement a snap three-day lockdown, the match between the Sharks and Sea Eagles was postponed by a day.
7 August	21	New Zealand Warriors	Cbus Super Stadium, Gold Coast	Loss	16-18	Tracey, Nikora, Kennedy	Trindall 2/3	Trindall 0/1	
Team Details: FB / 1 / William Kennedy; WG / 2 / Sione Katoa; CE / 3 / Will Chambers; CE / 4 / Jesse Ramien; WG / 5 / Ronaldo Mulitalo; FE / 6 / Connor Tracey; HB / 7 / Braydon Trindall; PR / 8 / Toby Rudolf; HK / 9 / Blayke Brailey; PR / 10 / Aaron Woods (c); SR / 11 / Briton Nikora; SR / 12 / Siosifa Talakai; LK / 13 / Jack Williams; Interchange: IC / 14 / Braden Hamlin-Uele; IC / 16 / Aiden Tolman; IC / 17 / Andrew Fifita; IC / 19 / Luke Metcalf; Concussion Substitute: RE / 20 / Billy Magoulias; Reserves: RE / 15 / Royce Hunt; RE / 18 / Matt Moylan; RE / 21 / Jonaiah Lualua
15 August	22	Newcastle Knights	Moreton Daily Stadium, Redcliffe	Loss	14-16	Ramien, Mulitalo	Trindall 3/3		
Team Details: FB / 1 / William Kennedy; WG / 2 / Sione Katoa; CE / 3 / Siosifa Talakai; CE / 4 / Jesse Ramien; WG / 5 / Ronaldo Mulitalo; FE / 6 / Connor Tracey; HB / 7 / Braydon Trindall; PR / 8 / Braden Hamlin-Uele; HK / 9 / Blayke Brailey; PR / 10 / Aaron Woods (c); SR / 11 / Briton Nikora; SR / 12 / Jack Williams; LK / 13 / Toby Rudolf; Interchange: IC / 14 / Luke Metcalf; IC / 15 / Aiden Tolman; IC / 16 / Andrew Fifita; IC / 17 / Billy Magoulias; Concussion Substitute: RE / 20 / Kai O'Donnell; Reserves: RE / 18 / Jonaiah Lualua; RE / 19 / Will Chambers; RE / 21 / Mawene Hiroti
21 August	23	Wests Tigers	Browne Park, Rockhampton	Win	50-20	Katoa (2), Mulitalo (2), Kennedy (2), Metcalf (2), Wilton	Trindall 7/9	Trindall 0/1	
Team Details: FB / 1 / William Kennedy; WG / 2 / Sione Katoa; CE / 6 / Connor Tracey; CE / 4 / Jesse Ramien; WG / 5 / Ronaldo Mulitalo; FE / 14 / Luke Metcalf; HB / 7 / Braydon Trindall; PR / 8 / Toby Rudolf; HK / 9 / Blayke Brailey; PR / 10 / Aaron Woods (c); SR / 11 / Briton Nikora; SR / 12 / Siosifa Talakai; LK / 13 / Jack Williams; Interchange: IC / 15 / Braden Hamlin-Uele; IC / 16 / Teig Wilton; IC / 17 / Billy Magoulias; IC / 18 / Matt Moylan; Concussion Substitute: RE / 20 / Kai O'Donnell; Reserves: RE / 3 / Mawene Hiroti; RE / 19 / Will Chambers; RE / 21 / Jonaiah Lualua
28 August	24	Brisbane Broncos	Suncorp Stadium, Brisbane	Win	24-16	Katoa, Ramien, Tracey, Trindall	Trindall 4/5	Trindall 0/1	
Team Details: FB / 1 / William Kennedy; WG / 2 / Sione Katoa; CE / 3 / Connor Tracey; CE / 4 / Jesse Ramien; WG / 5 / Mawene Hiroti; FE / 6 / Luke Metcalf; HB / 7 / Braydon Trindall; PR / 8 / Toby Rudolf; HK / 9 / Blayke Brailey; PR / 10 / Aaron Woods (c); SR / 11 / Briton Nikora; SR / 12 / Siosifa Talakai; LK / 13 / Jack Williams; Interchange: IC / 14 / Matt Moylan; IC / 15 / Braden Hamlin-Uele; IC / 16 / Aiden Tolman; IC / 17 / Teig Wilton; Concussion Substitute: RE / 18 / Kai O'Donnell; Reserves: RE / 19 / Billy Magoulias; RE / 20 / Jensen Taumoepeau; RE / 21 / Jonaiah Lualua
3 September	25	Melbourne Storm	Cbus Super Stadium, Gold Coast	Loss	16-28	Katoa (2), Tracey	Trindall 2/4		
Team Details: FB / 1 / William Kennedy; WG / 2 / Sione Katoa; CE / 3 / Connor Tracey; CE / 4 / Jesse Ramien; WG / 5 / Mawene Hiroti; FE / 6 / Matt Moylan; HB / 7 / Braydon Trindall; PR / 8 / Toby Rudolf; HK / 9 / Blayke Brailey; PR / 10 / Aaron Woods (c); SR / 11 / Briton Nikora; SR / 12 / Teig Wilton; LK / 13 / Jack Williams; Interchange: IC / 14 / Luke Metcalf; IC / 15 / Braden Hamlin-Uele; IC / 16 / Aiden Tolman; IC / 17 / Siosifa Talakai; Concussion Substitute: RE / 18 / Kai O'Donnell; Reserves: RE / 19 / Billy Magoulias; RE / 20 / Jensen Taumoepeau; RE / 21 / Jonaiah Lualua
Legend: Win Loss Draw Bye

== Ladder ==
Pos	Team	Pld	W	D	L	B	PF	PA	PD	Pts	
1	Melbourne Storm (M)	24	21	0	3	1	815	316	+499	44	Advance to finals series
2	Penrith Panthers (P)	24	21	0	3	1	676	286	+390	44	Advance to finals series
3	South Sydney Rabbitohs	24	20	0	4	1	775	453	+322	42	Advance to finals series
4	Manly-Warringah Sea Eagles	24	16	0	8	1	744	492	+252	34	Advance to finals series
5	Sydney Roosters	24	16	0	8	1	630	489	+141	34	Advance to finals series
6	Parramatta Eels	24	15	0	9	1	566	457	+109	32	Advance to finals series
7	Newcastle Knights	24	12	0	12	1	428	571	−143	26	Advance to finals series
8	Gold Coast Titans	24	10	0	14	1	580	583	−3	22	Advance to finals series
9	Cronulla-Sutherland Sharks	24	10	0	14	1	520	556	−36	22	
10	Canberra Raiders	24	10	0	14	1	481	578	−97	22	
11	St. George Illawarra Dragons	24	8	0	16	1	474	616	−142	18	
12	New Zealand Warriors	24	8	0	16	1	453	624	−171	18	
13	Wests Tigers	24	8	0	16	1	500	714	−214	18	
14	Brisbane Broncos	24	7	0	17	1	446	695	−249	16	
15	North Queensland Cowboys	24	7	0	17	1	460	748	−288	16	
16	Canterbury-Bankstown Bulldogs (W)	24	3	0	21	1	340	710	−370	8	

Updated to match(es) played on 5 September 2021. Source: 2021 NRL Ladder
(M) Minor premiers; (P) Premiers; (W) Wooden spoon

=== Ladder progression ===
- Numbers highlighted in green indicate that the team finished the round inside the top 8.
- Numbers highlighted in blue indicates the team finished first on the ladder in that round.
- Numbers highlighted in red indicates the team finished last place on the ladder in that round.
- Underlined numbers indicate that the team had a bye during that round.

	Team	1	2	3	4	5	6	7	8	9	10	11	12	13	14	15	16	17	18	19	20	21	22	23	24	25
1	Melbourne Storm	2	2	2	4	6	8	10	12	14	16	18	20	22	24	26	28	30	32	34	36	38	40	42	42	44
2	Penrith Panthers (P)	2	4	6	8	10	12	14	16	18	20	22	24	24	24	26	28	30	32	34	34	36	38	40	42	44
3	South Sydney Rabbitohs	0	2	4	6	8	10	12	14	14	16	16	18	20	22	24	26	28	30	32	34	36	38	38	40	42
4	Manly Warringah Sea Eagles	0	0	0	0	2	4	6	6	8	10	12	12	14	16	18	20	20	22	24	26	26	28	30	32	34
5	Sydney Roosters	2	4	4	6	8	8	10	12	12	14	14	16	18	20	20	20	22	24	26	28	28	30	32	32	34
6	Parramatta Eels	2	4	6	8	8	10	12	14	16	18	18	18	20	22	24	24	26	28	28	28	28	28	30	32	32
7	Newcastle Knights	2	4	4	4	4	6	6	6	8	8	8	10	10	10	12	14	16	16	16	18	20	22	24	26	26
8	Gold Coast Titans	0	2	4	4	6	6	6	6	8	8	10	10	10	10	10	12	14	14	16	18	20	20	20	20	22
9	Cronulla-Sutherland Sharks	2	2	2	4	4	4	4	4	4	4	6	8	10	12	14	14	16	16	18	18	18	18	20	22	22
10	Canberra Raiders	2	4	4	6	6	6	6	6	6	8	8	8	10	12	12	12	14	16	18	18	20	20	20	22	22
11	St. George Illawarra Dragons	0	2	4	6	8	8	8	8	10	10	10	10	12	12	14	16	18	18	18	18	18	18	18	18	18
12	New Zealand Warriors	2	2	4	4	4	6	6	8	8	8	10	10	12	12	12	12	12	12	12	14	16	18	18	18	18
13	Wests Tigers	0	0	2	2	2	2	2	4	4	6	6	8	10	10	10	10	12	14	14	14	16	18	18	18	18
14	Brisbane Broncos	0	0	2	2	2	2	2	4	4	4	6	6	6	6	6	8	10	10	10	12	12	12	14	14	16
15	North Queensland Cowboys	0	0	0	0	2	4	6	6	8	8	10	12	14	14	14	14	14	14	14	14	14	14	14	16	16
16	Canterbury-Bankstown Bulldogs	0	0	0	0	0	0	2	2	2	2	2	2	4	6	6	6	6	6	6	6	6	6	6	6	8

== Coaching staff ==
- Josh Hannay — NRL Head Coach (Interim)
- Darren Mooney — General Manager – Football
- Mark Noakes — NRL Performance Operations
- Nathan Pickworth — Head of Performance
- Dave Howlett — NRL Assistant Coach
- Paul Gallen – NRL Specialist coach
- Luke Lewis – NRL Specialist coach
- Daniel Holdsworth – Elite Development Coach/NRL Assistant
- Tony Grimaldi — Strength and Conditioning Coach
- Alex Clarke — Strength Coach
- Dave Garrick – NRL Physiotherapist
- Pat Williams – NRL Physiotherapist
- John Davey – Sports Scientist
- Marc Leabres – Performance Analyst
- Luke Mace - NRL Operations
- Amanda King – Education and Wellbeing
- Jeff Robson – Education and Wellbeing
- Glenn Brailey – Academy and Talent Identification
- Dr. George Pitsis – Club Doctor

== Squad ==
No	Nat	Player	1st Position	2nd Position	Age	Height	Weight	NRL Games	Previous 1st Grade Club
1	(Australia)	William Kennedy	Fullback		23	183	88	19	None
2	(Tonga)	Sione Katoa	Wing		23	180	88	35	None
3	(Australia)	Josh Dugan	Centre	Fullback	30	189	102	207	St. George Illawarra Dragons
4	(Australia)	Jesse Ramien	Centre		23	184	98	58	Newcastle Knights
5	(Samoa)	Ronaldo Mulitalo	Wing	Centre	20	190	95	24	None
6	(Australia)	Matt Moylan	Five-Eighth	Fullback	29	185	90	132	Penrith Panthers
7	(Australia)	Chad Townsend; Mid-season loss	Halfback		29	181	89	176	New Zealand Warriors
8	(New Zealand)	Braden Hamlin-Uele	Prop		25	191	115	44	North Queensland Cowboys
9	(Australia)	Blayke Brailey	Hooker		21	180	80	35	None
10	(Australia)	Aaron Woods	Prop		29	194	111	209	Canterbury-Bankstown Bulldogs
11	(New Zealand)	Briton Nikora	Second Row		22	185	94	40	None
12	(Australia)	Wade Graham (c)	Second Row		29	186	96	248	Penrith Panthers
13	(Australia)	Toby Rudolf	Lock	Prop	24	190	106	20	None
14	(Australia)	Connor Tracey	Five-Eighth	Fullback	24	183	87	18	South Sydney Rabbitohs
15	(Australia)	Aiden Tolman	Prop		32	183	102	275	Canterbury-Bankstown Bulldogs
16	(Australia)	Jack Williams	Lock	Prop	24	184	98	45	None
17	(Greece)	Billy Magoulias	Lock	Second Row	23	179	99	5	None
18	(New Zealand)	Mawene Hiroti	Centre	Wing	21	187	95	7	South Sydney Rabbitohs
19	(Australia)	Teig Wilton	Second Row		20	186	98	5	None
20	(Australia)	Braydon Trindall	Halfback	Five-Eighth	21	180	90	5	None
21	(Australia)	Siosifa Talakai	Second Row	Lock	23	178	100	27	South Sydney Rabbitohs
22	(New Zealand)	Shaun Johnson; Mid-season loss	Five-Eighth	Halfback	30	179	91	196	New Zealand Warriors
23	(Australia)	Will Chambers; Mid-season gain	Centre		33	190	100	215	Suntory Sungoliath
24	(Tonga)	Andrew Fifita	Prop		31	194	118	223	Wests Tigers
25	(New Zealand)	Franklin Pele	Prop		19	190	132	0	None
26	(Australia)	Royce Hunt	Prop		25	192	112	15	Canberra Raiders
27	(Australia)	Luke Metcalf; Development player	Fullback	Five-Eighth	21	183	84	0	None
	(New Zealand)	Jackson Ferris; Development player	Centre	Wing	22	178	93	1	None
	(Australia)	Jonaiah Lualua; Development player	Wing		20	???	??	0	None
	(Papua New Guinea)	Nene Macdonald; Mid-season loss	Wing		26	192	108	98	North Queensland Cowboys
	(Australia)	Jack Martin; Development player	Prop		19	???	??	0	None
	(Australia)	Kai O'Donnell; Mid-season gain	Second Row	Hooker	22	181	98	4	Canberra Raiders
	(Australia)	Kyle Paterson	Hooker		21	178	83	0	None
	(New Zealand)	Jensen Taumoepeau	Centre	Wing	20	189	102	0	None
	(Australia)	Daniel Vasquez; Development player	Lock	Prop	23	189	107	1	None
	(Australia)	Jack A Williams; Development player	Five-Eighth	Hooker	24	175	75	0	None
	(Australia)	Bronson Xerri; Mid-season loss	Centre		20	187	99	22	None

== Player movements ==
Losses

- Bryson Goodwin released
- Shaun Johnson released (mid-season)
- Cameron King to Townsville Blackhawks (Intrust Super Cup)
- Nene Macdonald to Norths Devils (Intrust Super Cup) (mid-season)
- Scott Sorensen to Penrith Panthers
- Chad Townsend to New Zealand Warriors (mid-season)
- Bronson Xerri to suspended (mid-season)

Gains

- Will Chambers from Suntory Sungoliath (Top League) (mid-season)
- Jack Martin from Ipswich Jets (Hastings Deering Colts)
- Luke Metcalf from Manly-Warringah Sea Eagles
- Kai O'Donnell from Mackay Cutters (Intrust Super Cup) (mid-season)
- Aiden Tolman from Canterbury-Bankstown Bulldogs

== Player Appearances ==
FB=Fullback	W=Winger	C=Centre	FE=Five-Eighth	HB=Halfback	PR=Prop	H=Hooker	SR=Second Row	L=Lock	B=Bench	R=Reserve

No	Player	1	2	3	4	5	6	7	8	9	10	11	12	13	14	15	16	17	18	19	20	21	22	23	24	25
1	Blayke Brailey	H	H	H	H	H	H	H	H	H	H	H	H	–	H	H	H	H	H	H	H	H	H	H	H	H
2	Will Chambers	On 19 April, Will Chambers signed a one-year deal with the club after being granted an immediate release from the Suntory Sungoliath of the Top League.						C (NSW)	C	C	C	C	C	–	C	C	R	Red card	Red card	Red card	C	C	R	R	–	–
3	Josh Dugan	C	C	C	C	C		C	R	R	C	C	Red card	–	C (NSW)	C (NSW)	Red card	Red card	Red card	Red card	Red card	Red card	Red card	Red card	Red card	Red card
4	Andrew Fifita	PR (NSW)	–	PR (NSW)	PR (NSW)	PR (NSW)	Red card	Red card	Red card	Red card	B				B	PR (NSW)	R	R	R	B	B	B	B			
5	Wade Graham (c)	SR	SR	SR	SR	SR			SR	SR	SR	SR	SR	–	SR											
6	Braden Hamlin-Uele	PR	PR	PR	PR	PR	PR	PR	B							B	B	B	B	B	B	B	PR	B	B	B
7	Mawene Hiroti	R	C	R	W	W	W	W	W	W	W	W	Red card	–	C (NSW)	C (NSW)	B	B	B	B				R	W	W
8	Royce Hunt																		R	B	B	R	–	–	–	–
9	Shaun Johnson							FE	FE	FE			HB	–	HB	HB	HB	HB	HB	HB				On 17 August, Shaun Johnson was granted an immediate release from his contract to return to New Zealand in preparation for the 2022 NRL season.		
10	Sione Katoa	W	W	W											W (NSW)	W (NSW)	W	W	W	W	W	W	W	W	W	W
11	William Kennedy	FB	FB	FB	FB	FB	FB	FB	FB	FB	FB	FB	FB	–	FB	FB	FB	FB	FB	FB	FB	FB	FB	FB	FB	FB
12	Nene Macdonald	W (NSW)	R	W (NSW)	R	W (NSW)	R	C (NSW)	–	–	–	W (NSW)	–	W (NSW)	W (NSW)	W (NSW)	–	–	–	–	On 30 July, Nene Macdonald was announced as an immediate signing for the Norths Devils of the Intrust Super Cup for the remainder of the 2021 NRL season.					
13	Billy Magoulias	B	B	B	B	B	B L (NSW)	B	B	B	R	B L (NSW)	R	L (NSW)	L (NSW)	R	R	R	R	R	R	R	B	B	R	R
14	Matt Moylan	FE	FE	FE	FE	FE	FE			B	FE	FE	FE	–	FE	FE								B	B	FE
15	Ronaldo Mulitalo	W	W	W	W	W							W	–	W	W	W	W	W	W	W	W	W	W		
16	Briton Nikora	SR	SR	SR	Red card	Red card	SR	SR	SR	SR	SR	SR	SR	–	SR	SR	SR	B	B	SR	SR	SR	SR	SR	SR	SR
17	Kai O'Donnell	On 10 August, Kai O'Donnell signed with the club from the Mackay Cutters of the Intrust Super Cup for the remainder of the year. O'Donnell was previously contracted with the Canberra Raiders during the season.																					R	R	R	R
18	Kyle Paterson	H (NSW)	–	B (NSW)	B (NSW)	B (NSW)	H (NSW)	B (NSW)	–	–	–	B (NSW)	–	B (NSW)	H (NSW)	H (NSW)	–	–	–	–	–	–	–	–	–	–
19	Franklin Pele	PR (JFC)	PR (JFC)	PR (JFC)	PR (JFC)	B (NSW)	B (NSW)	PR (JFC)	PR (JFC)	R	R	PR (NSW)	B	PR (NSW)	PR (NSW)											
20	Jesse Ramien	C	Red card	Red card	Red card	C	C	C		C			C	–	C	C	C	C	C	C		C	C	C	C	C
21	Toby Rudolf	L	L	L	L	L	L	L	L	L	L	L	L	–	L	L	L	L	L	PR	L	PR	L	PR	PR	PR
22	Siosifa Talakai						B	B	Red card	Red card	Red card	Red card	B	SR (NSW)	B	SR	B	SR	SR	SR	C	SR	C	SR	SR	B
23	Jensen Taumoepeau	C (JFC)	C (JFC)	C (JFC)	C (NSW)	C (NSW)	C (NSW)	C (JFC)	C (JFC)	R	R	C (NSW)	R	C (NSW)	C (JFC)	C (JFC)	–	–	–	–	–	–	–	–	R	R
24	Aiden Tolman	B	B	B	B	B	B	Red card	PR	PR	PR	PR	PR	–	PR	PR	PR	PR	PR	Red card	PR	B	B	Red card	B	B
25	Chad Townsend	HB	HB	HB	HB	HB	HB	HB	HB	HB	HB	HB	R	–	HB (NSW)	HB (NSW)	On 23 June, Chad Townsend was granted an immediate release from his contract, signing with the New Zealand Warriors for the remainder of the 2021 NRL season.									
26	Connor Tracey	B	B	C	C	B	W	W	W	W	W	W	W	–	W	W	C	C	C	C	FE	FE	FE	C	C	C
27	Braydon Trindall	HB (NSW)	R	HB (NSW)	B	HB (NSW)	B HB (NSW)	B	B	R	B	B	B	–	B	B	FE	FE	FE	FE	HB	HB	HB	HB	HB	HB
28	Jack Williams	B	B	B	B	B	SR	B	B	B	B	B	B	–	B	B	B	B	B	L	SR	L	SR	L	L	L
29	Teig Wilton	SR (NSW)	R	B	SR	SR	C	SR	C	B	B	B	Red card	–	SR (NSW)	B	SR	SR	SR					B	B	SR
30	Aaron Woods	PR	PR	PR	PR	PR	PR	PR	PR	PR	PR	PR	PR	–	PR	PR	PR	PR	PR	PR	PR	PR	PR	PR	PR	PR
31	Bronson Xerri	Red card	Red card	On 23 March, Bronson Xerri's contract was terminated after being formally suspended by the NRL Anti-Doping Tribunal.																						
Development Players
30	Jackson Ferris	C (NSW)																								
32	Jonaiah Lualua	W (JFC)	W (JFC)	W (JFC)	W (JFC)	W (NSW)	W (NSW)	W (NSW)	W (JFC)	–	–	C (NSW)	W (JFC)	C (NSW)	W (JFC)	W (JFC)	–	–	–	R	R	R	R	R	R	R
33	Jack Martin	PR (JFC)	PR (JFC)	PR (JFC)	PR (JFC)	–	PR (JFC)	PR (JFC)	PR (JFC)	–	–	PR (JFC)	B (JFC)	B (JFC)	PR (JFC)	PR (JFC)	–	–	–	–	–	–	–	–	–	–
34	Luke Metcalf	–	–	FB (NSW)	FB (NSW)	FB (NSW)	FB (NSW)	FB (NSW)	–	–	–	FE (NSW)	–	HB (NSW)	FE (NSW)	FB (NSW)	–	R	R	R	B	B	B	FE	FE	B
35	Daniel Vasquez	PR (NSW)	–	PR (NSW)	PR (NSW)	PR (NSW)	PR (NSW)	PR (NSW)	–	–	–	PR (NSW)	–	PR (NSW)	PR (NSW)	PR (NSW)	–	–	–	–	–	–	–	–	–	–
36	Jack A Williams			FE (NSW)	FE (NSW)	FE (NSW)	FE (NSW)	FE (NSW)	–	FE (NSW)	FE (NSW)	R (NSW)	–			FE (NSW)	–	–	–	–	–	–	–	–	–	–

== Representative honours ==
Pos.	Player	Team	Call-up	References
First Grade
N/A	Blayke Brailey	Emerging Blues	Pre-season NSW preparations	
N/A	Sione Katoa	Emerging Blues	Pre-season NSW preparations	
N/A	Toby Rudolf	Emerging Blues	Pre-season NSW preparations	
N/A	Siosifa Talakai	Emerging Blues	Pre-season NSW preparations	
PR	Andrew Fifita	Indigenous All Stars	2021 All Stars Match	
CE	Jesse Ramien	Indigenous All Stars	2021 All Stars Match	
SR	Briton Nikora	(Māori people) Maori All Stars	2021 All Stars Match	
RE	Ronaldo Mulitalo^{1}	Queensland Maroons	2021 State of Origin	
Under 18s
FB	Siteni Taukamo	City Under 18s	2021 Country vs City Under 18s	
BE	Kobie Wilson	City Under 18s	2021 Country vs City Under 18s	
Under 16s
BE	Lachlan Araullo	City Under 16s	2021 Country vs City Under 16s	
Women's
FB	Jaime Chapman	Indigenous All Stars	2021 All Stars Match	
HK	Quincy Dodd	Indigenous All Stars	2021 All Stars Match	
SR	Kennedy Cherrington	(Māori people) Maori All Stars	2021 All Stars Match	
WG	Zali Fay	(Māori people) Maori All Stars	2021 All Stars Match	
CE	**Corban Baxter**	(Māori people) Maori All Stars	2021 All Stars Match	
FE	**Corban Baxter**	City Women's	2021 Country vs City Open Women's	
PR	Kennedy Cherrington	City Women's	2021 Country vs City Open Women's	
HK	Quincy Dodd	City Women's	2021 Country vs City Open Women's	
SR	Talei Holmes	City Women's	2021 Country vs City Open Women's	
CE	Tiana Penitani	City Women's	2021 Country vs City Open Women's	
HB	Maddie Studdon	City Women's	2021 Country vs City Open Women's	
FE	Corban Baxter	New South Wales Women	2021 Women's State of Origin	
BE	Kennedy Cherrington	New South Wales Women	2021 Women's State of Origin	
BE	Quincy Dodd	New South Wales Women	2021 Women's State of Origin	
WG	Tiana Penitani	New South Wales Women	2021 Women's State of Origin	
HB	Maddie Studdon	New South Wales Women	2021 Women's State of Origin	
Women's Under 19s
LK	Tegan Dymock	City Women's Under 19s	Harvey Norman Women's National Championships	
HB	Zali Hopkins	City Women's Under 19s	Harvey Norman Women's National Championships	
WG	Andie Robinson	City Women's Under 19s	Harvey Norman Women's National Championships	
BE	Tegan Dymock	New South Wales Women's Under 19s	2021 Women's Under 19s State of Origin	
CE	Andie Robinson	New South Wales Women's Under 19s	2021 Women's Under 19s State of Origin	

- **Bold** denotes players who captained their respective teams.
- **(ToS)** - Train on Squad

^{1} – Ronaldo Mulitalo was originally set to make his debut for the Queensland Maroons but was found to be ineligible despite having played representative rugby league for Queensland's under 18s and under 20s sides.

== Squad statistics ==
Statistics Source:

Name	App	T	G	FG	Pts
Blayke Brailey	24	2	0	0	8
Will Chambers	9	1	0	0	4
Josh Dugan	8	3	0	0	12
Andrew Fifita	6	0	0	0	0
Wade Graham	11	0	0	0	0
Braden Hamlin-Uele	19	1	0	0	4
Mawene Hiroti	14	5	0	0	20
Royce Hunt	2	0	0	0	0
Shaun Johnson	10	1	18	1	41
Sione Katoa	13	9	0	0	36
William Kennedy	24	14	0	0	56
Billy Magoulias	11	0	0	0	0
Luke Metcalf	6	2	0	0	8
Matt Moylan	15	2	0	0	8
Ronaldo Mulitalo	16	10	0	0	40
Briton Nikora	22	4	0	0	16
Franklin Pele	1	0	0	0	0
Jesse Ramien	17	4	0	0	16
Toby Rudolf	24	1	0	0	4
Siosifa Talakai	15	1	0	0	4
Aiden Tolman	21	1	0	0	4
Chad Townsend	11	0	31	1	63
Connor Tracey	24	14	0	0	56
Braydon Trindall	18	4	36	0	88
Jack Williams	24	2	0	0	8
Teig Wilton	15	2	0	0	8
Aaron Woods	23	3	0	0	12
27 Players used	—	87	85	2	520

== NSWRL Major Comps ==
=== Knock-On Effect NSW Cup (Newtown Jets) ===
==== Pre-season ====
Date	Round	Opponent	Venue	Result	Score	Tries	Goals	Field Goals	Report
13 February	Trial Match	Penrith Panthers	St Marys League Stadium, Sydney	Win	18-10	Garlick, Uele, Miller	Tuha 2/2, Peachey 1/1		
Team Details: FB / 1 / Tyla Tamou; WG / 2 / Johnathan Tufaga; CE / 3 / Tyrone Phillips; CE / 4 / Dylan O'Connor; WG / 5 / Eddie Aiono; FE / 6 / Wyatt Rangi; HB / 7 / Wyndham Peachey; PR / 8 / Brock Gray; HK / 9 / Zac Woolford; PR / 10 / Kurt Dillon; SR / 11 / Bronson Garlick; SR / 12 / Tom Caughlan; LK / 13 / Duwanye Mariner; Interchange: IC / 14 / Brock Ilett; IC / 15 / Eli Roberts; IC / 16 / Josh Delailoa; IC / 17 / Caleb Uele; IC / 18 / Muong Dut; IC / 19 / Jonah Ngaronoa; IC / 20 / Ethan Natoli; IC / 21 / Sione Afemui; IC / 22 / Honeti Tuha; IC / 23 / Jackson Stewart; IC / 24 / Benton Leme; IC / 25 / Josh Natoli; IC / 26 / Jackson Garlick; IC / 27 / Joe Barber; IC / 28 / D'Rhys Miller; IC / 29 / Jakiel Mariner
20 February	Trial Match	Blacktown Workers Sea Eagles	H.E. Laybutt Stadium, Sydney	Draw	12-12	Tuha, Rangi, Gray	Both clubs agreed that there would be no conversion attempts during the match.		
Team Details: FB / 1 / Honeti Tuha; WG / 2 / Eddie Aiono; CE / 3 / Addison Demetriou; CE / 4 / Jonah Ngaronoa; WG / 5 / Tyrone Phillips; FE / 6 / Wyatt Rangi; HB / 7 / Wyndham Peachey; PR / 8 / Tom Hazelton; HK / 9 / Zac Woolford; PR / 10 / Kurt Dillon; SR / 11 / Bronson Garlick; SR / 12 / D'Rhys Miller; LK / 13 / Gabe Hamlin; Interchange: IC / 14 / Brock Ilett; IC / 15 / Eli Roberts; IC / 16 / Josh Delailoa; IC / 17 / Muong Dut; IC / 18 / Dylan O'Connor; IC / 19 / Ethan Natoli; IC / 20 / Johnathan Tufaga; IC / 21 / Jackson Stewart; IC / 22 / Caleb Uele; IC / 23 / Manaia Rudolph; IC / 24 / Tyla Tamou; IC / 25 / Brock Gray; IC / 26 / Jackson Garlick; IC / 27 / Tom Caughlan; IC / 28 / Duwanye Mariner
27 February	Trial Match	Mount Pritchard Mounties	Netstrata Jubilee Stadium, Sydney	Win	28-12	Macdonald, Trindall, Garlick, Tamou, Hazelton, O'Connor	Trindall 2/6		
Team Details: FB / 1 / Luke Metcalf; WG / 2 / Eddie Aiono; CE / 3 / Addison Demetriou; CE / 4 / Tyrone Phillips; WG / 5 / Nene Macdonald; FE / 6 / Manaia Rudolph; HB / 7 / Braydon Trindall; PR / 8 / Kayleb Milne; HK / 9 / Kyle Paterson; PR / 10 / Daniel Vasquez; SR / 11 / Bronson Garlick; SR / 12 / Josh Carr; LK / 13 / Monty Raper; Interchange: IC / 14 / Gabe Hamlin; IC / 15 / Zac Woolford; IC / 16 / Brock Gray; IC / 17 / Tom Hazelton; IC / 18 / Tyla Tamou; IC / 19 / Dylan O'Connor; IC / 20 / Johnathan Tufaga; IC / 21 / D'Rhys Miller; IC / 22 / Wyatt Rangi; IC / 23 / Honeti Tuha; IC / 24 / Jonah Ngaronoa; IC / 25 / Wyndham Peachey; IC / 26 / Duwanye Mariner
Legend: Win Loss Draw Bye

==== Regular season ====
Date	Round	Opponent	Venue	Result	Score	Tries	Goals	Field Goals	Report
14 March	1	St. George Illawarra Dragons	Netstrata Jubilee Stadium, Sydney	Win	16-10	Wilton, Aiono, Trindall	Trindall 2/3		
Team Details: FB / 1 / Honeti Tuha; WG / 2 / Eddie Aiono; CE / 3 / Tyrone Phillips; CE / 4 / Jackson Ferris; WG / 5 / Nene Macdonald; FE / 18 / Manaia Rudolph; HB / 19 / Braydon Trindall; PR / 10 / Daniel Vasquez; HK / 9 / Kyle Paterson; PR / 23 / Andrew Fifita; SR / 11 / Bronson Garlick (c); SR / 14 / Teig Wilton; LK / 13 / Gabe Hamlin; Interchange: IC / 15 / Zac Woolford; IC / 16 / Brock Gray; IC / 17 / Tom Hazelton; IC / 21 / Monty Raper; Reserves: RE / 6 / Tyla Tamou; RE / 7 / Luke Metcalf; RE / 8 / Brock Ilett; RE / 12 / D'Rhys Miller; RE / 26 / Wyndham Peachey
15 May	2	Newcastle Knights	Maitland Sports Ground, Sydney	Loss	8-22	Garlick, Aiono	Aiono 0/2		
Team Details: FB / 1 / Dylan O'Connor; WG / 2 / Eddie Aiono; CE / 3 / Tyla Tamou; CE / 4 / Tom Rodwell; WG / 5 / Tom Caughlan; FE / 6 / Jack A Williams (c); HB / 7 / Angus Ernst; PR / 8 / Brock Gray; HK / 9 / Zac Woolford; PR / 10 / Jesse Colquhoun; SR / 11 / Jack Boyling; SR / 12 / Bronson Garlick; LK / 13 / Tyler Slade; Interchange: IC / 14 / D'Rhys Miller; IC / 15 / Ethan Natoli; IC / 17 / Ryan Verlinden; IC / 21 / Kayleb Milne; Reserves: RE / 1 / Luke Metcalf; RE / 2 / Jonaiah Lualua; RE / 3 / Nene Macdonald; RE / 5 / Jensen Taumoepeau; RE / 8 / Brock Ilett; RE / 10 / Daniel Vasquez; RE / 15 / Kyle Paterson; RE / 17 / Franklin Pele; RE / 19 / Duwanye Mariner
Due to heavy rainfall, round two of the Knock-On Effect NSW Cup was moved to Cessnock Sports Ground on the 21st of March. The Jets were originally slated to face the Knights at Central Coast Stadium on the 19th. The match was then moved to PointsBet Stadium before being deferred due to continued heavy rain.
27 March	3	Parramatta Eels	Bankwest Stadium, Sydney	Loss	20-22	Garlick (2), Gray, Trindall	Trindall 2/4		
Team Details: FB / 1 / Luke Metcalf; WG / 2 / Eddie Aiono; CE / 3 / Jonah Ngaronoa; CE / 4 / Kayal Iro; WG / 20 / Nene Macdonald; FE / 6 / Jack A Williams; HB / 19 / Braydon Trindall; PR / 10 / Daniel Vasquez; HK / 9 / Zac Woolford; PR / 23 / Andrew Fifita; SR / 11 / Kayleb Milne; SR / 12 / Bronson Garlick (c); LK / 13 / Gabe Hamlin; Interchange: IC / 8 / Tom Hazelton; IC / 14 / Monty Raper; IC / 15 / Kyle Paterson; IC / 16 / Brock Gray; Reserves: RE / 5 / Honeti Tuha; RE / 7 / Manaia Rudolph; RE / 22 / Dylan O'Connor
3 April	4	Canberra Raiders	Belconnen Oval, Canberra	Loss	20-60	Metcalf, Aiono, Williams, Tuha	Metcalf 1/3, Tuha 1/1		
Team Details: FB / 1 / Luke Metcalf; WG / 2 / Eddie Aiono; CE / 4 / Kayal Iro; CE / 24 / Jensen Taumoepeau; WG / 5 / Honeti Tuha; FE / 6 / Jack A Williams (c); HB / 7 / Manaia Rudolph; PR / 10 / Daniel Vasquez; HK / 9 / Zac Woolford; PR / 23 / Andrew Fifita; SR / 11 / Brock Gray; SR / 12 / Bronson Garlick; LK / 16 / Ethan Natoli; Interchange: IC / 14 / Brock Ilett; IC / 15 / Kyle Paterson; IC / 19 / Duwanye Mariner; IC / 20 / Tom Caughlan; Reserves: RE / 3 / Jonah Ngaronoa; RE / 8 / Tom Hazelton; RE / 13 / Monty Raper; RE / 18 / Tyla Tamou
11 April	5	North Sydney Bears	North Sydney Oval, Sydney	Draw	20-20	Metcalf (2), Lualua, Garlick	Trindall 2/4		
Team Details: FB / 1 / Luke Metcalf; WG / 20 / Nene Macdonald; CE / 4 / Kayal Iro; CE / 24 / Jensen Taumoepeau; WG / 22 / Jonaiah Lualua; FE / 6 / Jack A Williams (c); HB / 19 / Braydon Trindall; PR / 10 / Daniel Vasquez; HK / 9 / Zac Woolford; PR / 23 / Andrew Fifita; SR / 12 / Bronson Garlick; SR / 21 / D'Rhys Miller; LK / 11 / Brock Gray; Interchange: IC / 2 / Eddie Aiono; IC / 15 / Kyle Paterson; IC / 16 / Ethan Natoli; IC / 17 / Franklin Pele; Reserves: RE / 2 / Eddie Aiono; RE / 3 / Jonah Ngaronoa; RE / 5 / Honeti Tuha; RE / 7 / Manaia Rudolph; RE / 8 / Tom Hazelton; RE / 13 / Monty Raper; RE / 14 / Brock Ilett; RE / 19 / Duwanye Mariner; RE / 20 / Tom Caughlan
17 April	6	Newcastle Knights	Henson Park, Sydney	Loss	22-42	Lualua (4), Trindall	Trindall 1/5		
Team Details: FB / 1 / Luke Metcalf; WG / 2 / Eddie Aiono; CE / 4 / Dylan O'Connor; CE / 24 / Jensen Taumoepeau; WG / 5 / Jonaiah Lualua; FE / 6 / Jack A Williams (c); HB / 19 / Braydon Trindall; PR / 8 / Brock Gray; HK / 9 / Kyle Paterson; PR / 10 / Daniel Vasquez; SR / 11 / D'Rhys Miller; SR / 12 / Bronson Garlick; LK / 14 / Billy Magoulias; Interchange: IC / 13 / Gabe Hamlin; IC / 15 / Zac Woolford; IC / 17 / Franklin Pele; IC / 21 / Kayleb Milne; Reserves: RE / 3 / Johnathan Tufaga; RE / 7 / Tyla Tamou; RE / 14 / Ethan Natoli; RE / 16 / Tom Hazelton; RE / 16 / Brock Ilett; RE / 20 / Monty Raper
24 April	7	Mount Pritchard Mounties	Henson Park, Sydney	Win	30-14	Garlick (2), Tamou, Metcalf, Macdonald	Metcalf 5/6		
Team Details: FB / 1 / Luke Metcalf; WG / 5 / Jonaiah Lualua; CE / 3 / Nene Macdonald; CE / 4 / Will Chambers; WG / 22 / Dylan O'Connor; FE / 6 / Jack A Williams (c); HB / 26 / Tyla Tamou; PR / 10 / Daniel Vasquez; HK / 9 / Zac Woolford; PR / 16 / Brock Ilett; SR / 11 / D'Rhys Miller; SR / 12 / Bronson Garlick; LK / 13 / Gabe Hamlin; Interchange: IC / 8 / Brock Gray; IC / 14 / Ethan Natoli; IC / 15 / Kyle Paterson; IC / 19 / Duwanye Mariner; Reserves: RE / 2 / Eddie Aiono; RE / 21 / Kayleb Milne
	8	Bye							
8 May	9	Penrith Panthers	BlueBet Stadium, Sydney	Loss	18-46	Garlick (2), Aiono, Miller	Tuha 1/2, Williams 0/1, Aiono 0/1		
Team Details: FB / 1 / Honeti Tuha; WG / 2 / Eddie Aiono; CE / 3 / Eli Roberts; CE / 4 / Dylan O'Connor; WG / 5 / Tom Rodwell; FE / 6 / Jack A Williams (c); HB / 7 / Tyla Tamou; PR / 8 / Brock Ilett; HK / 9 / Zac Woolford; PR / 10 / Brock Gray; SR / 11 / D'Rhys Miller; SR / 12 / Bronson Garlick; LK / 13 / Tyler Slade; Interchange: IC / 14 / Ethan Natoli; IC / 15 / Duwanye Mariner; IC / 16 / Jesse Colquhoun; IC / 18 / Wyatt Rangi; Reserves: RE / 1 / Luke Metcalf; RE / 2 / Jonaiah Lualua; RE / 3 / Josh Dugan; RE / 5 / Nene Macdonald; RE / 10 / Daniel Vasquez; RE / 14 / Jensen Taumoepeau; RE / 15 / Kyle Paterson
Due to COVID-19 regulations, both sides were prevented from including any NRL full-time squad members on match day.
	10	Bye							
22 May	11	St. George Illawarra Dragons	Henson Park, Sydney	Win	44-20	Pele (2), Garlick (2), O'Connor, Aiono, Macdonald, Lualua	Metcalf 6/8		
Team Details: FB / 1 / Dylan O'Connor; WG / 2 / Eddie Aiono; CE / 3 / Jensen Taumoepeau; CE / 4 / Jonaiah Lualua; WG / 5 / Nene Macdonald; FE / 6 / Luke Metcalf; HB / 18 / Manaia Rudolph; PR / 8 / Franklin Pele; HK / 15 / Zac Woolford; PR / 10 / Daniel Vasquez; SR / 12 / Bronson Garlick (c); SR / 22 / Tom Caughlan; LK / 14 / Billy Magoulias; Interchange: IC / 9 / Kyle Paterson; IC / 13 / Brock Gray; IC / 17 / Ryan Verlinden; IC / 19 / Ethan Natoli; Reserves: RE / 7 / Jack A Williams; RE / 11 / D'Rhys Miller; RE / 21 / Kayleb Milne
	12	Bye							
5 June	13	Canberra Raiders	Henson Park, Sydney	Loss	10-20	Aiono, Talakai	Metcalf 1/2		
Team Details: FB / 1 / Dylan O'Connor; WG / 2 / Eddie Aiono; CE / 3 / Jensen Taumoepeau; CE / 4 / Jonaiah Lualua; WG / 5 / Nene Macdonald; FE / 6 / Bronson Garlick (c); HB / 7 / Luke Metcalf; PR / 10 / Daniel Vasquez; HK / 9 / Zac Woolford; PR / 17 / Franklin Pele; SR / 11 / Tom Caughlan; SR / 12 / Siosifa Talakai; LK / 13 / Billy Magoulias; Interchange: IC / 14 / Brock Gray; IC / 15 / Kyle Paterson; IC / 16 / Monty Raper; IC / 19 / Ethan Natoli; Reserves: RE / 8 / Andrew Fifita; RE / 20 / Kayleb Milne; RE / 21 / Ryan Verlinden
11 June	14	Penrith Panthers	Henson Park, Sydney	Loss	16-32	Pele, Macdonald, Metcalf	Townsend 2/3		
Team Details: FB / 1 / Dylan O'Connor; WG / 2 / Sione Katoa; CE / 3 / Josh Dugan; CE / 4 / Mawene Hiroti; WG / 5 / Nene Macdonald; FE / 6 / Luke Metcalf; HB / 7 / Chad Townsend; PR / 10 / Daniel Vasquez; HK / 9 / Kyle Paterson; PR / 17 / Franklin Pele; SR / 11 / Teig Wilton; SR / 12 / Bronson Garlick (c); LK / 13 / Billy Magoulias; Interchange: IC / 8 / Brock Gray; IC / 14 / Monty Raper; IC / 15 / Zac Woolford; IC / 19 / Tom Caughlan; Reserves: RE / 3 / Jensen Taumoepeau; RE / 4 / Jonaiah Lualua; RE / 12 / Gabe Hamlin; RE / 17 / Ryan Verlinden; RE / 19 / Ethan Natoli
19 June	15	Manly Sea Eagles	Henson Park, Sydney	Win	26-12	Metcalf (2), Hiroti, Macdonald, Garlick	Townsend 3/5		
Team Details: FB / 1 / Luke Metcalf; WG / 2 / Sione Katoa; CE / 3 / Josh Dugan; CE / 4 / Mawene Hiroti; WG / 5 / Nene Macdonald; FE / 6 / Jack A Williams (c); HB / 7 / Chad Townsend; PR / 8 / Andrew Fifita; HK / 9 / Kyle Paterson; PR / 10 / Daniel Vasquez; SR / 11 / Gabe Hamlin; SR / 12 / Bronson Garlick; LK / 13 / Kurt Dillon; Interchange: IC / 14 / Brock Gray; IC / 15 / Zac Woolford; IC / 16 / Monty Raper; IC / 19 / Eddie Aiono; Reserves: RE / 17 / Ryan Verlinden; RE / 19 / Ethan Natoli; RE / 20 / Tom Hazelton; RE / 22 / Tom Caughlan
3 July	16	North Sydney Bears	Henson Park, Sydney	Draw	0-0				
10 July	17	South Sydney Rabbitohs	Redfern Oval, Sydney	Draw	0-0				
18 July	18	Mount Pritchard Mounties	Aubrey Keech Reserve, Sydney	Draw	0-0				
24 July	19	Western Suburbs Magpies	Henson Park, Sydney	Draw	0-0				
	20	Bye							
7 August	21	South Sydney Rabbitohs	Henson Park, Sydney	Draw	0-0				
Rounds 16, 17, 18, 19, 20 and 21 of the Knock-On Effect Cup were cancelled in line with the NSW Public Health Order to deal with the public health risk of the recent COVID-19 outbreak. All clubs received one point for a draw (COVID draw). On 10 August, the NSWRL made the call to abandon the remainder of the competition due to the COVID-19 outbreak.
Legend: Win Loss Draw Bye

=== Jersey Flegg Cup (U21s) ===
==== Regular season ====
Date	Round	Opponent	Venue	Result	Score	Tries	Goals	Field Goals	Report
13 March	1	St. George Illawarra Dragons	Collegians Sporting Complex, Wollongong	Loss	4-10	Lualua	Pickering 1/1		
Team Details: FB / 1 / Trentham Petersen; WG / 2 / Kayal Iro; CE / 3 / Jensen Taumoepeau; CE / 4 / Kyle Pickering; WG / 5 / Jonaiah Lualua; FE / 6 / Harrison Geraghty; HB / 7 / Angus Ernst; PR / 8 / Franklin Pele; HK / 9 / Isaac Longmuir; PR / 10 / Jack Martin; SR / 11 / Kai Parker; SR / 12 / Jack Boyling (c); LK / 13 / Tyler Slade; Interchange: IC / 14 / Jesse Colquhoun; IC / 15 / Thomas Giles; IC / 16 / Rhys Dakin; IC / 17 / Bailey Cantrill; Reserves: RE / 18 / Zane Jegers; RE / 19 / Alec Brennan
21 March	2	Victoria Thunderbolts	Netstrata Jubilee Stadium, Sydney	Win	18-10	Rodwell, Geraghty, Parker, Pickering	Pickering 1/3, Lualua 0/1		
Team Details: FB / 1 / Trentham Petersen; WG / 2 / Tom Rodwell; CE / 3 / Jensen Taumoepeau; CE / 4 / Kyle Pickering; WG / 5 / Jonaiah Lualua; FE / 6 / Harrison Geraghty; HB / 7 / Angus Ernst; PR / 8 / Franklin Pele; HK / 9 / Isaac Longmuir; PR / 10 / Jack Martin; SR / 11 / Kai Parker; SR / 20 / Kayal Iro; LK / 12 / Jack Boyling (c); Interchange: IC / 14 / Jesse Colquhoun; IC / 15 / Thomas Giles; IC / 16 / Rhys Dakin; IC / 17 / Bailey Cantrill; Reserves: RE / 13 / Tyler Slade; RE / 18 / Zane Jegers; RE / 19 / Alec Brennan
27 March	3	Parramatta Eels	McCredie Park, Sydney	Win	26-18	Pele, Ernst, Pickering, Taumoepeau, Parker	Pickering 3/6		
Team Details: FB / 1 / Trentham Petersen; WG / 2 / Tom Rodwell; CE / 3 / Jensen Taumoepeau; CE / 4 / Kyle Pickering; WG / 5 / Jonaiah Lualua; FE / 6 / Harrison Geraghty; HB / 7 / Angus Ernst; PR / 8 / Franklin Pele; HK / 9 / Isaac Longmuir; PR / 10 / Jack Martin; SR / 11 / Kai Parker; SR / 12 / Jack Boyling (c); LK / 13 / Tyler Slade; Interchange: IC / 14 / Jesse Colquhoun; IC / 15 / Thomas Giles; IC / 16 / Rhys Dakin; IC / 17 / Bailey Cantrill; Reserves: RE / 18 / Zane Jegers; RE / 19 / Alec Brennan
2 April	4	Sydney Roosters	PointsBet Stadium, Sydney	Win	20-10	Pickering, Ernst, Coyne, Longmuir	Pickering 2/4		
Team Details: FB / 1 / Trentham Petersen; WG / 2 / Tom Rodwell; CE / 3 / James Coyne; CE / 4 / Kyle Pickering; WG / 5 / Jonaiah Lualua; FE / 6 / Harrison Geraghty; HB / 7 / Angus Ernst; PR / 10 / Jack Martin; HK / 9 / Isaac Longmuir; PR / 20 / Franklin Pele; SR / 11 / Kai Parker; SR / 12 / Jack Boyling (c); LK / 13 / Tyler Slade; Interchange: IC / 14 / Jesse Colquhoun; IC / 15 / Thomas Giles; IC / 17 / Bailey Cantrill; IC / 19 / Alec Brennan; Reserves: RE / 16 / Rhys Dakin
	5	Bye							
17 April	6	Victoria Thunderbolts	Haines Drive Reserve, Melbourne	Draw	18-18	Stonestreet, Petersen, Boyling, Iro	Pickering 1/4		
Team Details: FB / 1 / Trentham Petersen; WG / 2 / Tom Rodwell; CE / 3 / Kayal Iro; CE / 4 / Kyle Pickering; WG / 5 / Sam Stonestreet; FE / 6 / Harrison Geraghty; HB / 7 / Angus Ernst; PR / 8 / Jesse Colquhoun; HK / 13 / Tyler Slade; PR / 10 / Jack Martin; SR / 11 / Kai Parker; SR / 16 / Rhys Dakin; LK / 12 / Jack Boyling (c); Interchange: IC / 9 / Isaac Longmuir; IC / 14 / Alec Brennan; IC / 15 / Thomas Giles; IC / 18 / Blake Hosking; Reserves: RE / 17 / Bailey Cantrill; RE / 19 / Semisi Sikei
24 April	7	Canterbury-Bankstown Bulldogs	Netstrata Jubilee Stadium, Sydney	Loss	12-28	Dykes (2), Stonestreet	Pickering 0/3		
Team Details: FB / 21 / Kade Dykes; WG / 2 / Tom Rodwell; CE / 4 / Kyle Pickering; CE / 22 / Jensen Taumoepeau; WG / 5 / Sam Stonestreet; FE / 6 / Harrison Geraghty; HB / 7 / Angus Ernst; PR / 10 / Jack Martin; HK / 9 / Isaac Longmuir; PR / 20 / Franklin Pele; SR / 12 / Jack Boyling (c); SR / 16 / Rhys Dakin; LK / 13 / Tyler Slade; Interchange: IC / 8 / Jesse Colquhoun; IC / 15 / Thomas Giles; IC / 18 / Blake Hosking; IC / 19 / Semisi Sikei; Reserves: RE / 1 / Trentham Petersen; RE / 3 / Kayal Iro; RE / 11 / Kai Parker; RE / 14 / Alec Brennan; RE / 17 / Bailey Cantrill
1 May	8	South Sydney Rabbitohs	PointsBet Stadium, Sydney	Win	30-14	Coyne (2), Pele, Samrani, Longmuir	Lualua 5/5		
Team Details: FB / 19 / Jordan Samrani; WG / 2 / Tom Rodwell; CE / 3 / Jensen Taumoepeau; CE / 4 / James Coyne; WG / 5 / Jonaiah Lualua; FE / 6 / Harrison Geraghty; HB / 7 / Angus Ernst; PR / 8 / Franklin Pele; HK / 9 / Isaac Longmuir; PR / 10 / Jack Martin; SR / 11 / Kyle Pickering; SR / 15 / Semisi Sikei; LK / 13 / Tyler Slade; Interchange: IC / 14 / Jesse Colquhoun; IC / 16 / Rhys Dakin; IC / 17 / Blake Hosking; IC / 18 / Alec Brennan; Reserves: RE / 1 / Kade Dykes; RE / 12 / Jack Boyling (c); RE / 20 / Josh Finau
7 May	9	Penrith Panthers	BlueBet Stadium, Sydney	Draw	20-20	Coyne, Longmuir, Hosking, Boyling	Samrani 1/3, Longmuir 1/2		
Team Details: FB / 1 / Kade Dykes; WG / 3 / Jordan Samrani; CE / 4 / James Coyne; CE / 19 / Josh Finau; WG / 5 / Sam Stonestreet; FE / 6 / Harrison Geraghty; HB / 7 / Angus Ernst; PR / 12 / Semisi Sikei; HK / 9 / Isaac Longmuir; PR / 15 / Thomas Giles; SR / 16 / Rhys Dakin; SR / 22 / Deighton Ieriko; LK / 13 / Jack Boyling (c); Interchange: IC / 17 / Blake Hosking; IC / 18 / Alec Brennan; IC / 20 / Bailey Cantrill; IC / 23 / Zane Jegers; Reserves: RE / 2 / Tom Rodwell; RE / 8 / Franklin Pele; RE / 10 / Jack Martin; RE / 11 / Kyle Pickering; RE / 14 / Jesse Colquhoun; RE / 21 / Cody Fuz
	10	Bye							
21 May	11	St. George Illawarra Dragons	Netstrata Jubilee Stadium, Sydney	Loss	18-24	Rodwell, Stonestreet, Geraghty	Pickering 3/3		
Team Details: FB / 1 / Kade Dykes; WG / 2 / Tom Rodwell; CE / 3 / Kayal Iro; CE / 4 / James Coyne; WG / 5 / Sam Stonestreet; FE / 6 / Harrison Geraghty; HB / 7 / Angus Ernst; PR / 8 / Jesse Colquhoun; HK / 9 / Isaac Longmuir; PR / 10 / Jack Martin; SR / 11 / Kyle Pickering; SR / 12 / Semisi Sikei; LK / 13 / Jack Boyling (c); Interchange: IC / 14 / Josh Finau; IC / 15 / Thomas Giles; IC / 16 / Rhys Dakin; IC / 17 / Blake Hosking; Reserves: RE / 18 / Jordan Samrani; RE / 19 / Zane Jegers
30 May	12	Sydney Roosters	North Sydney Oval, Sydney	Loss	24-26	Coyne (2), Martin, Dykes	Lualua 4/4		
Team Details: FB / 1 / Kade Dykes; WG / 2 / Tom Rodwell; CE / 3 / Kayal Iro; CE / 4 / James Coyne; WG / 19 / Jonaiah Lualua; FE / 6 / Harrison Geraghty; HB / 7 / Angus Ernst; PR / 8 / Thomas Giles; HK / 9 / Isaac Longmuir; PR / 10 / Jesse Colquhoun; SR / 11 / Kyle Pickering; SR / 12 / Semisi Sikei; LK / 13 / Jack Boyling (c); Interchange: IC / 15 / Jack Martin; IC / 16 / Rhys Dakin; IC / 17 / Blake Hosking; IC / 20 / Zane Jegers; Reserves: IC / RE / Josh Finau; RE / 18 / Jordan Samrani; RE / 19 / Manaia Waitere; RE / 21 / Bailey Cantrill
5 June	13	Canterbury-Bankstown Bulldogs	Belmore Sports Ground, Sydney	Loss	14-24	Iro, Dykes, Longmuir	Pickering 1/3		
Team Details: FB / 1 / Kade Dykes; WG / 2 / Tom Rodwell; CE / 3 / Kayal Iro; CE / 4 / James Coyne; WG / 5 / Jordan Samrani; FE / 20 / Harrison Geraghty; HB / 7 / Angus Ernst; PR / 8 / Thomas Giles; HK / 9 / Isaac Longmuir; PR / 10 / Jesse Colquhoun; SR / 6 / Kyle Pickering; SR / 11 / Jack Boyling (c); LK / 13 / Rhys Dakin; Interchange: IC / 15 / Jack Martin; IC / 16 / Zane Jegers; IC / 17 / Blake Hosking; IC / 23 / Deighton Ieriko; Reserves: RE / 12 / Semisi Sikei; RE / 14 / Josh Finau; RE / 18 / Manaia Waitere; RE / 19 / Alec Brennan; RE / 21 / Bailey Cantrill
11 June	14	Penrith Panthers	Netstrata Jubilee Stadium, Sydney	Loss	10-17	Boyling, Iro	Pickering 1/2		
Team Details: FB / 1 / Kade Dykes; WG / 2 / Tom Rodwell; CE / 3 / Kayal Iro; CE / 20 / Jensen Taumoepeau; WG / 5 / Jonaiah Lualua; FE / 6 / Harrison Geraghty; HB / 7 / Angus Ernst; PR / 8 / Jesse Colquhoun; HK / 9 / Isaac Longmuir; PR / 10 / Jack Martin; SR / 11 / Kyle Pickering; SR / 12 / Jack Boyling (c); LK / 13 / Tyler Slade; Interchange: IC / 4 / James Coyne; IC / 14 / Alec Brennan; IC / 15 / Thomas Giles; IC / 16 / Rhys Dakin; Reserves: RE / 5 / Sam Stonestreet; RE / 17 / Jordan Samrani; RE / 18 / Manaia Waitere; RE / 21 / Bailey Cantrill
19 June	15	Manly Sea Eagles	4 Pines Oval, Sydney	Win	18-16	Lualua, Giles, Sikei	Lualua 3/3		
Team Details: FB / 1 / Kade Dykes; WG / 2 / Tom Rodwell; CE / 3 / Jensen Taumoepeau; CE / 4 / James Coyne; WG / 5 / Jonaiah Lualua; FE / 6 / Manaia Waitere; HB / 7 / Angus Ernst; PR / 8 / Jesse Colquhoun; HK / 9 / Blake Hosking; PR / 10 / Jack Martin; SR / 11 / Kyle Pickering; SR / 12 / Jack Boyling (c); LK / 13 / Tyler Slade; Interchange: IC / 14 / Semisi Sikei; IC / 15 / Thomas Giles; IC / 16 / Rhys Dakin; IC / 17 / Samuel Healey; Reserves: RE / 9 / Isaac Longmuir; RE / 18 / Jordan Samrani; RE / 19 / Josh Finau
	16	Bye							
11 July	17	South Sydney Rabbitohs	Redfern Oval, Sydney	Draw	0-0				
18 July	18	Parramatta Eels	PointsBet Stadium	Draw	0-0				
24 July	19	Wests Tigers	Henson Park, Sydney	Draw	0-0				
	20	Bye							
7 August	21	South Sydney Rabbitohs	Henson Park, Sydney	Draw	0-0				
Rounds 16, 17, 18, 19, 20 and 21 of the Jersey Flegg Cup were cancelled in line with the NSW Public Health Order to deal with the public health risk of the recent COVID-19 outbreak. All clubs received one point for a draw (COVID draw). On 10 August, the NSWRL made the call to abandon the remainder of the competition due to the COVID-19 outbreak.
Legend: Win Loss Draw Bye

=== Harvey Norman Women's Premiership ===
==== Regular season ====
Date	Round	Opponent	Venue	Result	Score	Tries	Goals	Field Goals	Report
13 March	1	South Sydney Rabbitohs	PointsBet Stadium, Sydney	Win	50-6	Takairangi (2), Holmes (2), Dodd (2), Fay, Cherrington, T. Penitani	Studdon 7/9		
Team Details: FB / 1 / Tiana Penitani; WG / 2 / Zali Fay; CE / 3 / Leianne Tufuga; CE / 4 / Kiana Takairangi; WG / 5 / Andie Robinson; FE / 6 / Corban McGregor (c); HB / 7 / Maddie Studdon; PR / 8 / Crystal Papalii; HK / 9 / Quincy Dodd; PR / 10 / Kennedy Cherrington; SR / 11 / Talei Holmes; SR / 12 / Zali Waihape-Andrews; LK / 14 / Tegan Dymock; Interchange: IC / 13 / Kaarla Cowan; IC / 15 / Analei Netzler; IC / 16 / Natasha Penitani; IC / 17 / Shae Muhleisen; Reserves: RE / 18 / Lynda Howarth; RE / 19 / Rosaline Aumale; RE / 20 / Ariel George; RE / 21 / Mary Makai
Due to heavy rainfall, round two of the Harvey Norman Women's Premiership was cancelled. The Sharks were originally set to face the Mount Pritchard Mounties at Aubrey Keech Reserve, Sydney.
28 March	3	Glebe Dirty Reds	Wentworth Park, Sydney	Win	58-0	Holmes (2), Tufuga (2), McGregor, Cherrington, Studdon, Dodd, Robinson, Cowan	Studdon 9/10		
Team Details: FB / 1 / Tiana Penitani; WG / 5 / Andie Robinson; CE / 3 / Leianne Tufuga; CE / 4 / Kiana Takairangi; WG / 18 / Lynda Howarth; FE / 6 / Corban McGregor (c); HB / 7 / Maddie Studdon; PR / 8 / Crystal Papalii; HK / 9 / Quincy Dodd; PR / 10 / Kennedy Cherrington; SR / 11 / Talei Holmes; SR / 12 / Zali Waihape-Andrews; LK / 13 / Kaarla Cowan; Interchange: IC / 14 / Tegan Dymock; IC / 15 / Analei Netzler; IC / 16 / Natasha Penitani; IC / 17 / Shae Muhleisen; Reserves: RE / 2 / Zali Fay; RE / 19 / Rosaline Aumale
	4	Bye							
11 April	5	North Sydney Bears	North Sydney Oval, Sydney	Win	22-12	Howarth, Robinson, Holmes, Studdon	Studdon 3/4		
Team Details: FB / 1 / Tiana Penitani; WG / 2 / Lynda Howarth; CE / 3 / Leianne Tufuga; CE / 4 / Kiana Takairangi; WG / 5 / Andie Robinson; FE / 6 / Corban McGregor (c); HB / 7 / Maddie Studdon; PR / 8 / Crystal Papalii; HK / 9 / Kaarla Cowan; PR / 10 / Kennedy Cherrington; SR / 11 / Talei Holmes; SR / 12 / Zali Waihape-Andrews; LK / 17 / Shae Muhleisen; Interchange: IC / 14 / Rosaline Aumale; IC / 15 / Zali Fay; IC / 16 / Natasha Penitani; IC / 18 / Quincy Dodd; Reserves: RE / 13 / Tegan Dymock; RE / 19 / Ariel George
19 April	6	Helensburgh Tigers	Rex Jackson Oval, Wollongong	Win	38-12	Howarth (2), Robinson (2), McGregor, Holmes, Cowan, T. Penitani	Studdon 3/8		
Team Details: FB / 1 / Tiana Penitani; WG / 2 / Lynda Howarth; CE / 3 / Leianne Tufuga; CE / 4 / Kiana Takairangi; WG / 5 / Andie Robinson; FE / 6 / Corban McGregor (c); HB / 7 / Maddie Studdon; PR / 8 / Crystal Papalii; HK / 9 / Quincy Dodd; PR / 10 / Kennedy Cherrington; SR / 11 / Talei Holmes; SR / 12 / Zali Waihape-Andrews; LK / 13 / Kaarla Cowan; Interchange: IC / 14 / Georgia Page; IC / 15 / Rosaline Aumale; IC / 16 / Natasha Penitani; IC / 17 / Shae Muhleisen; Reserves: RE / 19 / Ariel George
	7	Bye							
1 May	8	South Sydney Rabbitohs	PointsBet Stadium, Sydney	Win	34-0	Dodd (3), Cowan, Holmes, Tufuga	Studdon 5/6		
Team Details: FB / 1 / Tiana Penitani; WG / 2 / Lynda Howarth; CE / 3 / Leianne Tufuga; CE / 4 / Kiana Takairangi; WG / 5 / Andie Robinson; FE / 6 / Corban Baxter (c); HB / 7 / Maddie Studdon; PR / 8 / Crystal Papalii; HK / 9 / Quincy Dodd; PR / 10 / Kennedy Cherrington; SR / 11 / Talei Holmes; SR / 12 / Georgia Page; LK / 13 / Kaarla Cowan; Interchange: IC / 14 / Lavinia Taukamo; IC / 15 / Rosaline Aumale; IC / 16 / Natasha Penitani; IC / 18 / Mardi Longford; Reserves: RE / 17 / Shae Muhleisen; RE / 19 / Ariel George
8 May	9	Cabramatta Two Blues	PointsBet Stadium, Sydney	Win	80-0	Tufuga (5), Howarth (2), T. Penitani (2), Papalii, Aumale, N. Penitani, Dodd, Holmes, Baxter	Studdon 10/15		
Team Details: FB / 1 / Tiana Penitani; WG / 2 / Lynda Howarth; CE / 3 / Leianne Tufuga; CE / 4 / Kiana Takairangi; WG / 5 / Andie Robinson; FE / 6 / Corban Baxter (c); HB / 7 / Maddie Studdon; PR / 8 / Crystal Papalii; HK / 9 / Quincy Dodd; PR / 15 / Rosaline Aumale; SR / 11 / Talei Holmes; SR / 12 / Georgia Page; LK / 13 / Kaarla Cowan; Interchange: IC / 10 / Kennedy Cherrington; IC / 14 / Tayla Preston; IC / 16 / Natasha Penitani; IC / 17 / Lavinia Taukamo; Reserves: RE / 18 / Zali Hopkins; RE / 19 / Shae Muhleisen
	10	Bye							
22 May	11	Wests Tigers	PointsBet Stadium, Sydney	Win	40-6	Holmes (2), Dodd, T. Penitani, Takairangi, Studdon, Barker, Tufuga	Studdon 4/8		
Team Details: FB / 1 / Tiana Penitani; WG / 2 / Lynda Howarth; CE / 3 / Leianne Tufuga; CE / 4 / Kiana Takairangi; WG / 5 / Ella Barker; FE / 6 / Corban Baxter (c); HB / 7 / Maddie Studdon; PR / 8 / Crystal Papalii; HK / 9 / Quincy Dodd; PR / 10 / Kennedy Cherrington; SR / 11 / Talei Holmes; SR / 12 / Georgia Page; LK / 13 / Kaarla Cowan; Interchange: IC / 14 / Lavinia Taukamo; IC / 15 / Rosaline Aumale; IC / 16 / Natasha Penitani; IC / 18 / Tayla Preston; Reserves: RE / 19 / Zali Waihape-Andrews
29 May	12	Central Coast Roosters	Morry Breen Oval, Central Coast	Loss	10-24	Baxter, Robinson	Studdon 1/2		
Team Details: FB / 1 / Tiana Penitani; WG / 2 / Lynda Howarth; CE / 3 / Leianne Tufuga; CE / 4 / Kiana Takairangi; WG / 5 / Andie Robinson; FE / 6 / Corban Baxter (c); HB / 7 / Maddie Studdon; PR / 8 / Crystal Papalii; HK / 9 / Quincy Dodd; PR / 10 / Kennedy Cherrington; SR / 11 / Talei Holmes; SR / 12 / Georgia Page; LK / 13 / Kaarla Cowan; Interchange: IC / 14 / Zali Waihape-Andrews; IC / 15 / Rosaline Aumale; IC / 16 / Tayla Preston; IC / 17 / Lavinia Taukamo; Reserves: RE / 18 / Zali Hopkins
5 June	13	Wentworthville Magpies	NSWRL Centre of Excellence, Sydney	Win	36-4	Page (2), Takairangi (2), Holmes (2), Preston	Studdon 4/6, Preston 1/1		
Team Details: FB / 1 / Tiana Penitani; WG / 16 / Tayla Preston; CE / 3 / Leianne Tufuga; CE / 4 / Kiana Takairangi; WG / 18 / Andie Robinson; FE / 6 / Corban Baxter (c); HB / 7 / Maddie Studdon; PR / 8 / Crystal Papalii; HK / 9 / Quincy Dodd; PR / 10 / Kennedy Cherrington; SR / 11 / Talei Holmes; SR / 12 / Georgia Page; LK / 13 / Kaarla Cowan; Interchange: IC / 15 / Rosaline Aumale; IC / 17 / Lavinia Taukamo; IC / 19 / Natasha Penitani; IC / 20 / Tegan Dymock; Reserves: RE / 2 / Lynda Howarth; RE / 5 / Ella Barker; RE / 14 / Zali Waihape-Andrews; RE / 21 / Jae Withers
12 June	14	St Marys Saints	PointsBet Stadium, Sydney	Win	34-4	Tufuga (2), T. Penitani, Preston, Dodd, Cherrington	Preston 5/6		
Team Details: FB / 1 / Tiana Penitani; WG / 2 / Lynda Howarth; CE / 3 / Leianne Tufuga; CE / 4 / Andie Robinson; WG / 5 / Ella Barker; FE / 6 / Corban Baxter (c); HB / 7 / Tayla Preston; PR / 8 / Crystal Papalii; HK / 9 / Quincy Dodd; PR / 10 / Kennedy Cherrington; SR / 11 / Talei Holmes; SR / 12 / Georgia Page; LK / 13 / Kaarla Cowan; Interchange: IC / 14 / Lavinia Taukamo; IC / 15 / Rosaline Aumale; IC / 16 / Natasha Penitani; IC / 17 / Tegan Dymock; Reserves: RE / 4 / Kiana Takairangi; RE / 7 / Maddie Studdon; RE / 18 / Jae Withers; RE / 19 / Zali Waihape-Andrews
21 June	15	Helensburgh Tigers	Rex Jackson Oval, Wollongong	Loss	14-16	Holmes, Barker, Withers	Cowan 1/1, Preston 0/2, Hopkins 0/1		
Team Details: FB / 1 / Jae Withers; WG / 2 / Lynda Howarth; CE / 3 / Leianne Tufuga; CE / 4 / Kiana Takairangi; WG / 5 / Ella Barker; FE / 6 / Tayla Preston; HB / 7 / Zali Hopkins; PR / 8 / Crystal Papalii; HK / 13 / Kaarla Cowan; PR / 15 / Rosaline Aumale; SR / 11 / Talei Holmes; SR / 12 / Georgia Page; LK / 16 / Natasha Penitani; Interchange: IC / 9 / Alexandra Weir; IC / 14 / Tayla Curtis; IC / 17 / Mardi Longford; IC / 18 / Hannah Whatman; Reserves: RE / 14 / Kirsty Sant; RE / 19 / Lily Murdoch
Legend: Win Loss Draw Bye

- The Sharks were originally set to compete in the Harvey Norman Women's Premiership finals series. Due to the COVID lockdown situation in Sydney as well as surrounding areas, the NSWRL made the decision to cancel qualifying matches and head straight to a grand final, eliminating the Sharks from the competition.

== NSWRL Junior Reps ==
=== SG Ball Cup (U19s) ===
==== Regular season ====
Date	Round	Opponent	Venue	Result	Score	Tries	Goals	Field Goals	Report
6 February	1	Canberra Raiders	Bruce Oval, Canberra	Loss	24-28	Stonestreet, Abou-Arrage, Wilson, Dykes	Rivett 4/4		
Team Details: FB / 1 / Kade Dykes; WG / 2 / Sam Stonestreet; CE / 3 / Jordan Samrani; CE / 4 / Noah Lester; WG / 5 / Te Wehi Waitere; FE / 6 / Cody Fuz (c); HB / 7 / Ryan Rivett; PR / 8 / Josh Finau; HK / 9 / Kobie Wilson; PR / 10 / Semisi Sikei; SR / 11 / Jed Hardy; SR / 12 / Jake Biggs; LK / 13 / Blake Hosking; Interchange: IC / 14 / Sam Jinks; IC / 16 / Waylon Fiaii; IC / 17 / Billy Burke; IC / 19 / William Abou-Arrage; Reserves: RE / 15 / Toby Boothroyd; RE / 18 / Sam Healey; RE / 20 / Tully Wilton
	2	Bye							
20 February	3	North Sydney Bears	PointsBet Stadium, Sydney	Win	50-6	Dykes (2), Rivett (2), Samrani, Wilson, Fuz, Levi, Hosking	Rivett 5/7, Samrani 2/2		
Team Details: FB / 1 / Kade Dykes; WG / 2 / Sam Stonestreet; CE / 3 / Jordan Samrani; CE / 4 / Noah Lester; WG / 5 / Te Wehi Waitere; FE / 6 / Cody Fuz (c); HB / 7 / Ryan Rivett; PR / 8 / Josh Finau; HK / 9 / Kobie Wilson; PR / 10 / Semisi Sikei; SR / 11 / Jed Hardy; SR / 12 / Jake Biggs; LK / 13 / Blake Hosking; Interchange: IC / 15 / Toby Boothroyd; IC / 16 / Waylon Fiaii; IC / 17 / Billy Burke; IC / 19 / Douglas Levi; Reserves: RE / 14 / Sam Jinks; RE / 18 / Sam Healey; RE / 20 / Tully Wilton; RE / 21 / William Abou-Arrage
27 February	4	Balmain Tigers	PointsBet Stadium, Sydney	Win	34-8	Samrani (2), Sikei, Lester, Rivett, Finau	Rivett 3/4, Samrani 2/2		
Team Details: FB / 1 / Kade Dykes; WG / 2 / Sam Stonestreet; CE / 3 / Jordan Samrani; CE / 4 / Noah Lester; WG / 5 / Te Wehi Waitere; FE / 6 / Cody Fuz (c); HB / 7 / Ryan Rivett; PR / 8 / Josh Finau; HK / 9 / Kobie Wilson; PR / 10 / Semisi Sikei; SR / 11 / Jed Hardy; SR / 12 / Jake Biggs; LK / 13 / Blake Hosking; Interchange: IC / 14 / Sam Jinks; IC / 15 / Toby Boothroyd; IC / 16 / Waylon Fiaii; IC / 19 / Douglas Levi; Reserves: RE / 17 / Billy Burke; RE / 18 / Sam Healey
6 March	5	Sydney Roosters	Bill Hicks Oval, Wyong	Loss	14-26	Wilson, Stonestreet, Rivett	Rivett 1/3		
Team Details: FB / 1 / Kade Dykes; WG / 2 / Sam Stonestreet; CE / 3 / Jordan Samrani; CE / 4 / Noah Lester; WG / 5 / Te Wehi Waitere; FE / 6 / Cody Fuz (c); HB / 7 / Ryan Rivett; PR / 8 / Josh Finau; HK / 9 / Kobie Wilson; PR / 10 / Semisi Sikei; SR / 11 / Jed Hardy; SR / 15 / Toby Boothroyd; LK / 13 / Blake Hosking; Interchange: IC / 14 / Sam Jinks; IC / 16 / Waylon Fiaii; IC / 17 / Billy Burke; IC / 19 / Douglas Levi; Reserves: RE / 12 / Jake Biggs; RE / 18 / Sam Healey
13 March	6	Illawarra Steelers	Collegians Sporting Complex, Wollongong	Loss	26-40	Dykes (3), Stonestreet, Rivett	Rivett 3/5		
Team Details: FB / 1 / Kade Dykes; WG / 2 / Sam Stonestreet; CE / 3 / Jordan Samrani; CE / 4 / Noah Lester; WG / 5 / Te Wehi Waitere; FE / 6 / Cody Fuz (c); HB / 7 / Ryan Rivett; PR / 8 / Josh Finau; HK / 9 / Kobie Wilson; PR / 10 / Semisi Sikei; SR / 11 / Jed Hardy; SR / 12 / Toby Boothroyd; LK / 13 / Blake Hosking; Interchange: IC / 14 / Sam Healey; IC / 15 / Jake Biggs; IC / 16 / Waylon Fiaii; IC / 17 / Douglas Levi; Reserves: RE / 18 / Billy Burke; RE / 19 / Kenny Saad; RE / 20 / Jackson Lenzo
10 April	7	Parramatta Eels	PointsBet Stadium, Sydney	Loss	18-54	Finau, Bishop, Stonestreet	Samrani 2/2, Rivett 1/1		
Team Details: FB / 1 / Noah Lester; WG / 2 / Sam Stonestreet; CE / 3 / Jordan Samrani; CE / 19 / Carl Bishop; WG / 5 / Te Wehi Waitere; FE / 6 / Cody Fuz (c); HB / 7 / Ryan Rivett; PR / 8 / Josh Finau; HK / 14 / Sam Healey; PR / 10 / Jake Biggs; SR / 12 / Toby Boothroyd; SR / 4 / Douglas Levi; LK / 11 / Jed Hardy; Interchange: IC / 9 / Kobie Wilson; IC / 13 / Billy Burke; IC / 15 / William Abou-Arrage; IC / 20 / Jackson Lenzo; Reserves: RE / 16 / Waylon Fiaii; RE / 18 / Tully Wilton
Due to heavy rainfall, round seven of the SG Ball Cup was postponed to the weekend of 10-11 April. The match was originally set to take place on the 20th of March.
27 March	8	Western Suburbs Magpies	PointsBet Stadium, Sydney	Win	54-18	Dykes (3), Samrani (2), Stonestreet (2), Sikei, Wilson	Rivett 9/9		
Team Details: FB / 1 / Kade Dykes; WG / 2 / Sam Stonestreet; CE / 3 / Jordan Samrani; CE / 4 / Noah Lester; WG / 5 / Te Wehi Waitere; FE / 6 / Cody Fuz (c); HB / 7 / Ryan Rivett; PR / 10 / Semisi Sikei; HK / 14 / Sam Healey; PR / 15 / Jake Biggs; SR / 12 / Toby Boothroyd; SR / 16 / Douglas Levi; LK / 13 / Blake Hosking; Interchange: IC / 8 / Josh Finau; IC / 9 / Kobie Wilson; IC / 11 / Jed Hardy; IC / 17 / Billy Burke; Reserves: RE / 19 / Kenny Saad
3 April	9	Penrith Panthers	BlueBet Stadium, Penrith	Win	28-18	Waitere (2), Healey, Finau, Stonestreet	Rivett 3/4, Samrani 1/1		
Team Details: FB / 1 / Kade Dykes; WG / 2 / Sam Stonestreet; CE / 3 / Jordan Samrani; CE / 4 / Noah Lester; WG / 5 / Te Wehi Waitere; FE / 6 / Cody Fuz (c); HB / 7 / Ryan Rivett; PR / 10 / Semisi Sikei; HK / 14 / Sam Healey; PR / 15 / Jake Biggs; SR / 12 / Toby Boothroyd; SR / 16 / Douglas Levi; LK / 13 / Blake Hosking; Interchange: IC / 8 / Josh Finau; IC / 9 / Kobie Wilson; IC / 11 / Jed Hardy; IC / 17 / Billy Burke; Reserves: RE / 19 / Kenny Saad
Legend: Win Loss Draw Bye

=== Harold Matthews Cup (U17s) ===
==== Regular season ====
Date	Round	Opponent	Venue	Result	Score	Tries	Goals	Field Goals	Report
6 February	1	Canberra Raiders	Bruce Oval, Canberra	Win	28-4	Catton (2), Araullo, Stewart, Crossle	Christensen 4/5		
Team Details: FB / 1 / Chevy Stewart; WG / 2 / Harrison Hood; CE / 3 / Talanoa Penitani; CE / 4 / Koby Douglas; WG / 20 / Osca Catton; FE / 6 / Max Demeio; HB / 7 / Dylan Christensen; PR / 10 / Lachlan Crossle; HK / 9 / Taj Brailey (c); PR / 8 / Zane Watson; SR / 11 / Lawson Cotter; SR / 12 / Lachlan Colenso; LK / 13 / Luke Raymond; Interchange: IC / 14 / Billy Dickens; IC / 15 / Lachlan Araullo; IC / 16 / Justin Letton; IC / 17 / Ricardo Oloapu; Reserves: RE / 5 / Samson Mairi; RE / 18 / Mitchell Hodgson; RE / 19 / Albert Litisoni
	2	Bye							
20 February	3	North Sydney Bears	PointsBet Stadium, Sydney	Loss	20-24	Catton (2), Douglas, Stewart	Taukamo 1/3, Christensen 1/1		
Team Details: FB / 1 / Siteni Taukamo (c); WG / 5 / Chevy Stewart; CE / 3 / Talanoa Penitani; CE / 18 / Koby Douglas; WG / 4 / Osca Catton; FE / 6 / Max Demeio; HB / 7 / Dylan Christensen; PR / 8 / Lachlan Crossle; HK / 9 / Taj Brailey; PR / 10 / Zane Watson; SR / 11 / Lawson Cotter; SR / 12 / Lachlan Colenso; LK / 13 / Luke Raymond; Interchange: IC / 2 / Harrison Hood; IC / 14 / Sam McCulloch; IC / 15 / Lachlan Araullo; IC / 16 / Justin Letton; Reserves: RE / 17 / Samson Mairi; RE / 19 / Mitchell Hodgson; RE / 20 / Kurt Montgomery
27 February	4	Balmain Tigers	PointsBet Stadium, Sydney	Win	20-10	McCulloch, Douglas, Taukamo, Stewart	Christensen 2/3, Taukamo 0/1		
Team Details: FB / 1 / Siteni Taukamo (c); WG / 2 / Chevy Stewart; CE / 3 / Talanoa Penitani; CE / 4 / Koby Douglas; WG / 5 / Osca Catton; FE / 6 / Max Demeio; HB / 7 / Dylan Christensen; PR / 8 / Lachlan Crossle; HK / 9 / Taj Brailey; PR / 10 / Sam McCulloch; SR / 11 / Samson Mairi; SR / 12 / Mitchell Hodgson; LK / 13 / Zane Watson; Interchange: IC / 14 / Billy Dickens; IC / 15 / Lachlan Araullo; IC / 16 / Justin Letton; IC / 17 / Lawson Cotter; Reserves: RE / 18 / Ricardo Oloapu; RE / 19 / Lachlan Colenso; RE / 20 / Harrison Hood
6 March	5	Sydney Roosters	Bill Hicks Oval, Wyong	Loss	12-36	McCulloch, Cotter	Christensen 2/2		
Team Details: FB / 1 / Siteni Taukamo (c); WG / 21 / Talanoa Penitani; CE / 3 / Osca Catton; CE / 4 / Koby Douglas; WG / 2 / Chevy Stewart; FE / 6 / Max Demeio; HB / 7 / Dylan Christensen; PR / 8 / Zane Watson; HK / 9 / Taj Brailey; PR / 10 / Sam McCulloch; SR / 11 / Samson Mairi; SR / 12 / Mitchell Hodgson; LK / 13 / Justin Letton; Interchange: IC / 14 / Billy Dickens; IC / 15 / Lachlan Araullo; IC / 16 / Lawson Cotter; IC / 22 / Luke Raymond; Reserves: RE / 5 / Harrison Hood; RE / 17 / Ricardo Oloapu; RE / 19 / Lachlan Colenso; RE / 20 / Albert Litisoni
13 March	6	Illawarra Steelers	Collegians Sporting Complex, Wollongong	Draw	28-28	Penitani (2), Crossle, Taukamo, Cotter	Christensen 4/5		
Team Details: FB / 1 / Siteni Taukamo (c); WG / 2 / Chevy Stewart; CE / 3 / Talanoa Penitani; CE / 4 / Koby Douglas; WG / 5 / Osca Catton; FE / 6 / Max Demeio; HB / 7 / Dylan Christensen; PR / 8 / Lachlan Crossle; HK / 9 / Taj Brailey; PR / 10 / Sam McCulloch; SR / 11 / Lawson Cotter; SR / 12 / Luke Raymond; LK / 13 / Zane Watson; Interchange: IC / 14 / Billy Dickens; IC / 15 / Lachlan Araullo; IC / 17 / Ricardo Oloapu; IC / 20 / Riley Lester; Reserves: RE / 16 / Justin Letton; RE / 18 / Samson Mairi
10 April	7	Parramatta Eels	PointsBet Stadium, Sydney	Loss	10-30	Taukamo, Popovic	Stewart 1/2		
Team Details: FB / 1 / Chevy Stewart; WG / 5 / Albert Litisoni; CE / 21 / Samson Mairi; CE / 4 / Koby Douglas; WG / 2 / Osca Catton; FE / 6 / Siteni Taukamo (c); HB / 7 / Riley Lester; PR / 8 / Lachlan Crossle; HK / 9 / Taj Brailey; PR / 10 / Sam McCulloch; SR / 11 / Lawson Cotter; SR / 12 / Luke Raymond; LK / 13 / Nick Stonestreet; Interchange: IC / 14 / Billy Dickens; IC / 15 / Ryan Clements; IC / 16 / Lachlan Colenso; IC / 20 / Sasha Popovic; Reserves: RE / 3 / Talanoa Penitani; RE / 17 / Ricardo Oloapu; RE / 19 / Angus Riitano
Due to heavy rainfall, round seven of the Harold Matthews Cup was postponed to the weekend of 10-11 April. The match was originally set to take place on the 20th of March.
27 March	8	Western Suburbs Magpies	PointsBet Stadium, Sydney	Loss	6-36	Montgomery	Christensen 1/1		
Team Details: FB / 1 / Chevy Stewart; WG / 2 / Kurt Montgomery; CE / 3 / Talanoa Penitani; CE / 17 / Koby Douglas; WG / 5 / Osca Catton; FE / 20 / Max Demeio; HB / 7 / Dylan Christensen; PR / 8 / Lachlan Crossle; HK / 9 / Taj Brailey (c); PR / 16 / Nick Stonestreet; SR / 11 / Lawson Cotter; SR / 12 / Luke Raymond; LK / 13 / Zane Watson; Interchange: IC / 6 / Riley Lester; IC / 10 / Sam McCulloch; IC / 18 / Ryan Clements; IC / 21 / Samson Mairi; Reserves: RE / 4 / Siteni Taukamo (c); RE / 14 / Billy Dickens; RE / 15 / Lachlan Araullo; RE / 19 / Harrison Hood
3 April	9	Penrith Panthers	BlueBet Stadium, Penrith	Loss	18-20	Taukamo, Catton, Colenso	Stewart 3/3		
Team Details: FB / 1 / Chevy Stewart; WG / 5 / Albert Litisoni; CE / 3 / Talanoa Penitani; CE / 4 / Koby Douglas; WG / 2 / Osca Catton; FE / 6 / Siteni Taukamo (c); HB / 7 / Riley Lester; PR / 8 / Lachlan Crossle; HK / 9 / Taj Brailey; PR / 10 / Sam McCulloch; SR / 11 / Lawson Cotter; SR / 12 / Luke Raymond; LK / 13 / Nick Stonestreet; Interchange: IC / 14 / Billy Dickens; IC / 15 / Ryan Clements; IC / 16 / Lachlan Colenso; IC / 17 / Ricardo Oloapu; Reserves: RE / 19 / Harrison Hood; RE / 21 / Mitchell Hodgson
Legend: Win Loss Draw Bye

=== Tarsha Gale Cup (U19s) ===
==== Regular season ====
Date	Round	Opponent	Venue	Result	Score	Tries	Goals	Field Goals	Report
6 February	1	Canberra Raiders	Bruce Oval, Canberra	Win	16-12	Weir, Hopkins, Brennan	Griffin 2/3		
Team Details: FB / 1 / Lily Murdoch; WG / 2 / Ella Gould; CE / 3 / Chloe Boston; CE / 4 / Ella Barker; WG / 5 / Taylor Charman; FE / 6 / Alexandra Weir; HB / 7 / Zali Hopkins (c); PR / 8 / Kirsty Sant; HK / 9 / Sienna Stewart; PR / 10 / Skye Brennan; SR / 11 / Tayah Beckett; SR / 12 / Sophia Griffin; LK / 13 / Erika-May Kavana; Interchange: IC / 15 / Lilli O'Dea; IC / 16 / Tipani Matai; IC / 17 / Manaia Blair; IC / 20 / Tayla Curtis; Reserves: RE / 14 / Sarah Archer; RE / 18 / Maeghan McCauley; RE / 19 / Marama Katipa
12 February	2	Canterbury-Bankstown Bulldogs	PointsBet Stadium, Sydney	Win	18-8	Gould, Barker, Hopkins, Weir	Griffin 1/3		
Team Details: FB / 1 / Lily Murdoch; WG / 2 / Ella Gould; CE / 3 / Chloe Boston; CE / 4 / Ella Barker; WG / 5 / Taylor Charman; FE / 6 / Alexandra Weir; HB / 7 / Zali Hopkins (c); PR / 8 / Tayla Curtis; HK / 9 / Sienna Stewart; PR / 10 / Skye Brennan; SR / 11 / Tayah Beckett; SR / 12 / Sophia Griffin; LK / 13 / Kirsty Sant; Interchange: IC / 14 / Marama Katipa; IC / 15 / Lilli O'Dea; IC / 16 / Maeghan McCauley; IC / 17 / Tipani Matai; Reserves: RE / 18 / Manaia Blair
	3	Bye							
27 February	4	Newcastle Knights	PointsBet Stadium, Sydney	Loss	4-24	Boston	Griffin 0/1		
Team Details: FB / 1 / Lily Murdoch; WG / 2 / Ella Gould; CE / 3 / Chloe Boston; CE / 4 / Ella Barker; WG / 5 / Taylor Charman; FE / 6 / Alexandra Weir; HB / 7 / Zali Hopkins (c); PR / 8 / Tayla Curtis; HK / 9 / Sienna Stewart; PR / 10 / Skye Brennan; SR / 11 / Tayah Beckett; SR / 12 / Sophia Griffin; LK / 13 / Kirsty Sant; Interchange: IC / 14 / Marama Katipa; IC / 15 / Lilli O'Dea; IC / 16 / Erika-May Kavana; IC / 17 / Tipani Matai; Reserves: RE / 18 / Manaia Blair; RE / 19 / Maeghan McCauley
6 March	5	Indigenous Academy	Bill Hicks Oval, Wyong	Loss	8-14	Barker, Curtis	Griffin 0/1, Hopkins 0/1		
Team Details: FB / 1 / Lily Murdoch; WG / 2 / Ella Gould; CE / 3 / Chloe Boston; CE / 4 / Ella Barker; WG / 20 / Andie Robinson; FE / 6 / Alexandra Weir; HB / 7 / Zali Hopkins (c); PR / 13 / Kirsty Sant; HK / 9 / Sienna Stewart; PR / 18 / Manaia Blair; SR / 11 / Tayah Beckett; SR / 8 / Tayla Curtis; LK / 12 / Sophia Griffin; Interchange: IC / 5 / Taylor Charman; IC / 15 / Lilli O'Dea; IC / 16 / Erika-May Kavana; IC / 17 / Tipani Matai; Reserves: RE / 10 / Skye Brennan; RE / 14 / Marama Katipa; RE / 19 / Maeghan McCauley
13 March	6	Illawarra Steelers	Collegians Sporting Complex, Wollongong	Loss	4-44	Boston			
Team Details: FB / 1 / Lily Murdoch; WG / 2 / Ella Gould; CE / 3 / Chloe Boston; CE / 4 / Ella Barker; WG / 5 / Lilli O'Dea; FE / 6 / Alexandra Weir; HB / 7 / Zali Hopkins (c); PR / 8 / Kirsty Sant; HK / 9 / Sienna Stewart; PR / 15 / Maeghan McCauley; SR / 17 / Tipani Matai; SR / 12 / Tayla Curtis; LK / 16 / Erika-May Kavana; Interchange: IC / 11 / Tayah Beckett; IC / 14 / Taylor Charman; IC / 18 / Monica Litisoni; IC / 19 / Manaia Blair; Reserves: RE / 10 / Skye Brennan; RE / 13 / Sophia Griffin
10 April	7	Parramatta Eels	PointsBet Stadium, Sydney	Loss	12-30	Barker, Kavana	Griffin 2/2		
Team Details: FB / 1 / Ella Barker; WG / 18 / Mary Mateo; CE / 17 / Taylor Charman; CE / 2 / Ella Gould; WG / 5 / Lilli O'Dea; FE / 6 / Alexandra Weir; HB / 7 / Zali Hopkins (c); PR / 8 / Kirsty Sant; HK / 14 / Marama Katipa; PR / 10 / Tipani Matai; SR / 11 / Tayah Beckett; SR / 12 / Tayla Curtis; LK / 13 / Erika-May Kavana; Interchange: IC / 15 / Skye Brennan; IC / 19 / Talei Vakauta; IC / 20 / Sophia Griffin; IC / 21 / Maeghan McCauley; Reserves: RE / 3 / Chloe Boston; RE / 4 / Lily Murdoch; RE / 9 / Sienna Stewart; RE / 16 / Emeline Taufaeteau; RE / 18 / Mary Mateo
Due to heavy rainfall, round seven of the Tarsha Gale Cup was postponed to the weekend of 10-11 April. The match was originally set to take place on the 20th of March.
27 March	8	Wests Tigers	PointsBet Stadium, Sydney	Win	18-14	Curtis (2), Murdoch, Boston	Griffin 1/1, Hopkins 0/2, Weir 0/1		
Team Details: FB / 1 / Lily Murdoch; WG / 2 / Ella Gould; CE / 3 / Chloe Boston; CE / 4 / Ella Barker; WG / 5 / Lilli O'Dea; FE / 6 / Alexandra Weir; HB / 7 / Zali Hopkins (c); PR / 8 / Kirsty Sant; HK / 9 / Sienna Stewart; PR / 10 / Skye Brennan; SR / 11 / Tayah Beckett; SR / 12 / Tayla Curtis; LK / 15 / Sophia Griffin; Interchange: IC / 13 / Erika-May Kavana; IC / 14 / Manaia Blair; IC / 16 / Monica Litisoni; IC / 17 / Tipani Matai; Reserves: RE / 18 / Taylor Charman; RE / 19 / Mary Mateo
4 April	9	St. George Illawarra Dragons	Mascot Oval, Sydney	Loss	8-26	Curtis, Boston	Hopkins 0/1		
Team Details: FB / 1 / Ella Barker; WG / 2 / Ella Gould; CE / 4 / Lily Murdoch; CE / 18 / Andie Robinson; WG / 3 / Chloe Boston; FE / 6 / Alexandra Weir; HB / 7 / Zali Hopkins (c); PR / 8 / Kirsty Sant; HK / 9 / Sienna Stewart; PR / 10 / Skye Brennan; SR / 11 / Tayah Beckett; SR / 12 / Tayla Curtis; LK / 19 / Tegan Dymock; Interchange: IC / 13 / Sophia Griffin; IC / 14 / Erika-May Kavana; IC / 16 / Monica Litisoni; IC / 17 / Tipani Matai; Reserves: RE / 5 / Lilli O'Dea; RE / 15 / Taylor Charman; RE / 20 / Marama Katipa
Legend: Win Loss Draw Bye

==== Finals series ====
Date
Round
Opponent
Venue
Result
Score
Tries
Goals
Field Goals
Report
17 April
1
Indigenous Academy
Leichhardt Oval, Sydney
Loss
0-20

Team Details

FB	1	Ella Barker
WG	2	Ella Gould
CE	3	Chloe Boston
CE	4	Lily Murdoch
WG	5	Mary Mateo
FE	6	Alexandra Weir
HB	7	Zali Hopkins (c)
PR	8	Kirsty Sant
HK	9	Sienna Stewart
PR	14	Skye Brennan
SR	11	Tayah Beckett
SR	10	Tipani Matai
LK	13	Sophia Griffin
Interchange:
IC	15	Erika-May Kavana
IC	17	Lilli O'Dea
IC	18	Taylor Charman
IC	19	Maeghan McCauley
Reserves:
RE	12	Tayla Curtis
RE	16	Marama Katipa
