= Gabe Hamlin =

Australian rugby league footballer

Personal information
- Full name: Gabriel Hamlin
- Born: 4 January 1997 (age 28); Penrith, New South Wales, Australia
- Height: 5 ft 10 in (1.78 m)
- Weight: 14 st 13 lb (95 kg)

Playing information
- Position: Prop, Loose forward
Club
Years	Team	Pld	T	G	FG	P
2018–19	Wigan Warriors	26	3	0	0	12
2018(loan)	→ Swinton Lions	1	0	0	0	0
	Total	27	3	0	0	12
- Source: As of 25 March 2019

Gabriel Hamlin (born 4 January 1997) is a professional rugby league footballer who last played as a prop for the Wigan Warriors in the Super League.

He has spent time on loan from Wigan at the Swinton Lions in the 2018 Betfred Championship.

== Background ==
Hamlin was born in Penrith, New South Wales, Australia.

== Career ==
In 2018 he made his Super League début for Wigan against Hull Kingston Rovers.
