= Tom Rodwell =

Australian rugby league player

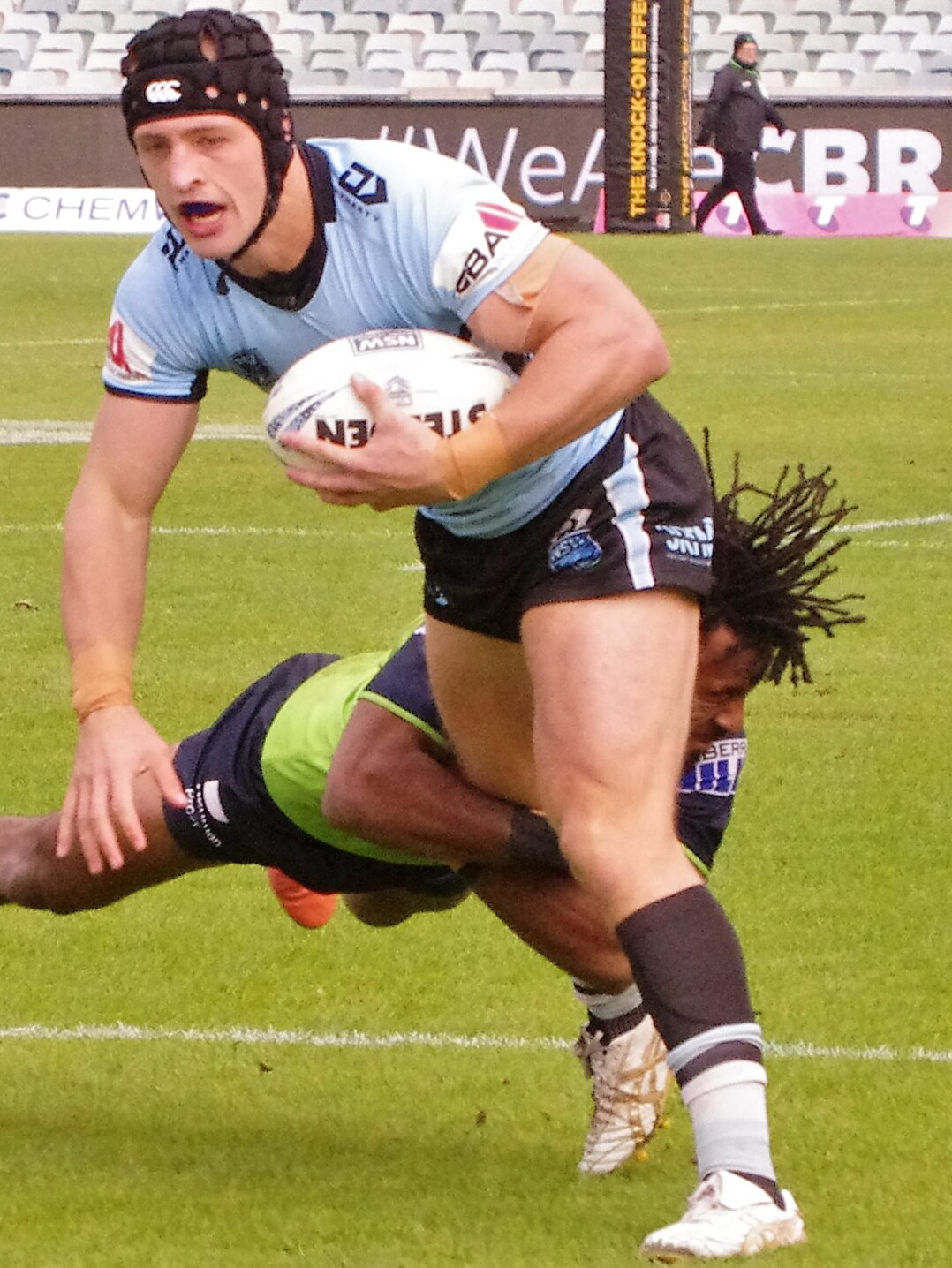

Personal information
- Full name: Thomas Rodwell
- Born: 10 September 2001 (age 25) Paddington, New South Wales, Australia
- Height: 178 cm (5 ft 10 in)
- Weight: 87 kg (13 st 10 lb)

Playing information
- Position: Wing
Club
Years	Team	Pld	T	G	FG	P
2025–	Sydney Roosters	2	0	0	0	0
- Source: As of 19 September 2026
- Father: Brett Rodwell

Tom Rodwell (born 10 September 2001) is an Australian professional rugby league footballer who plays as a wing for the Sydney Roosters in the National Rugby League.

== Background ==
Rodwell came through the Cronulla Sharks system before signing with the Roosters for the 2025 season.

== Career ==
In round 18 2025, Rodwell made his NRL debut for the Roosters against the Wests Tigers at Allianz Stadium. Playing Wing in a 30-28 loss. Rodwell re-signed with the Roosters until the end of 2026.
