= Kade Dykes =

Australian rugby league footballer

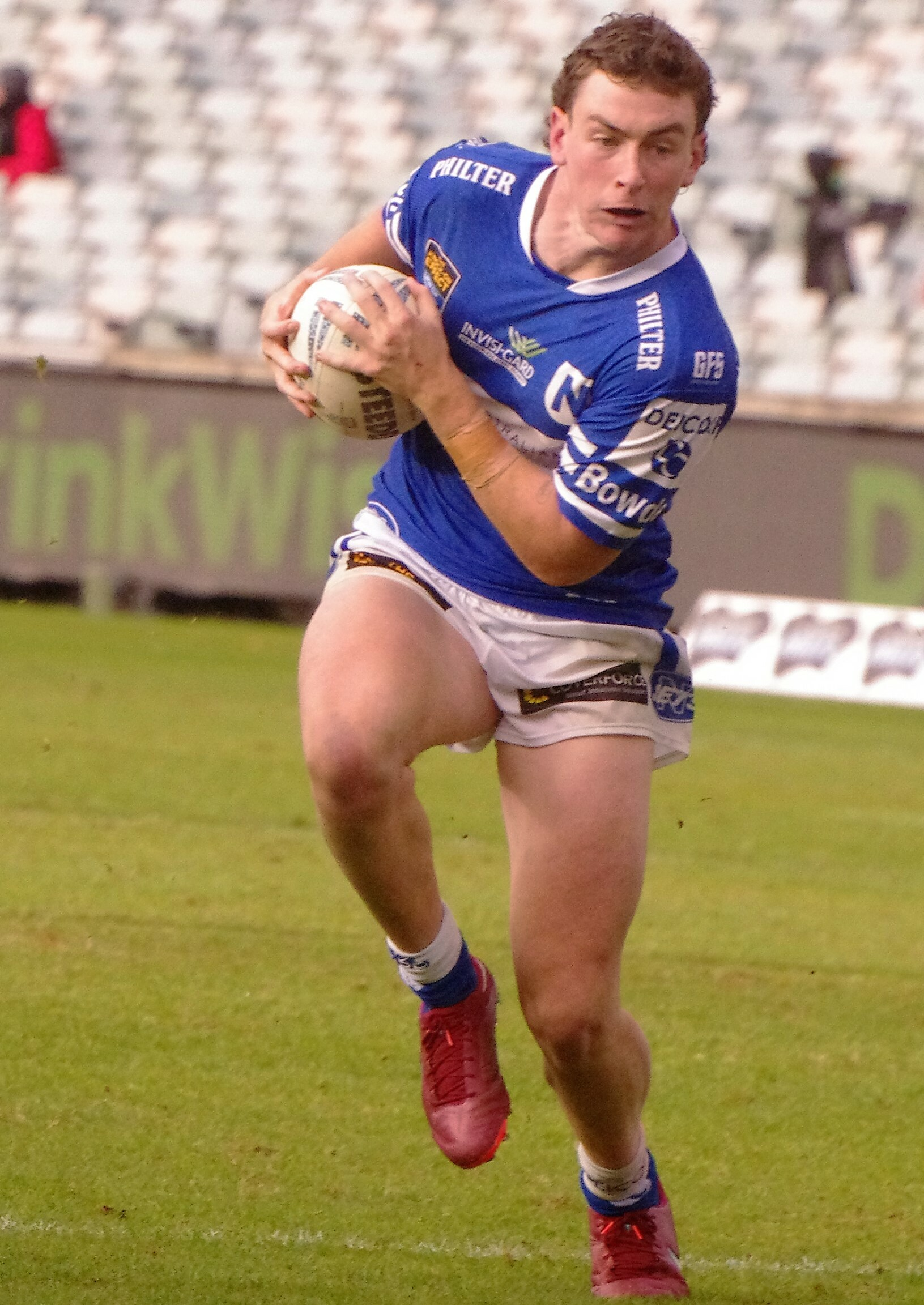

Personal information
- Born: 31 January 2002 (age 24) Sydney, New South Wales, Australia
- Height: 187 cm (6 ft 2 in)
- Weight: 92 kg (14 st 7 lb)

Playing information
- Position: Fullback
Club
Years	Team	Pld	T	G	FG	P
2022	Cronulla Sharks	2	1	0	0	4
2026–	Canterbury Bulldogs	0	0	0	0	0
	Total	2	1	0	0	4
- Source: Rugby League Project As of 14 August 2022
- Father: Adam Dykes

Kade Dykes (born 31 January 2002) is an Australian professional rugby league footballer who plays as a fullback for the Canterbury-Bankstown Bulldogs in the National Rugby League (NRL).

== Background ==
Kade Dykes is the son of former Cronulla player, Adam Dykes and grandson of John Dykes who also played for Cronulla.

== Career ==
=== 2022 ===
Dykes made his first grade debut for Cronulla against fierce rivals St. George Illawarra in round 21 of the 2022 NRL season.

=== 2025 ===
In April of the 2025 season, Dykes was ruled out for the rest of the playing season after he ruptured his patellar tendon playing in NSW cup. On 5 August, Canterbury announced that they had signed Dykes for the 2026 season.

== Statistics ==
=== NRL ===
Statistics are correct as of the end of the 2022 season

Season	Team	Matches	T	G	GK %	F/G	Pts
2022	Cronulla-Sutherland	2	1	0	—	0	4
2026	Canterbury-Bankstown Bulldogs						
Career totals		2	1	0	—	0	4
