= Ryan Verlinden =

Australian rugby league footballer (born 1986)

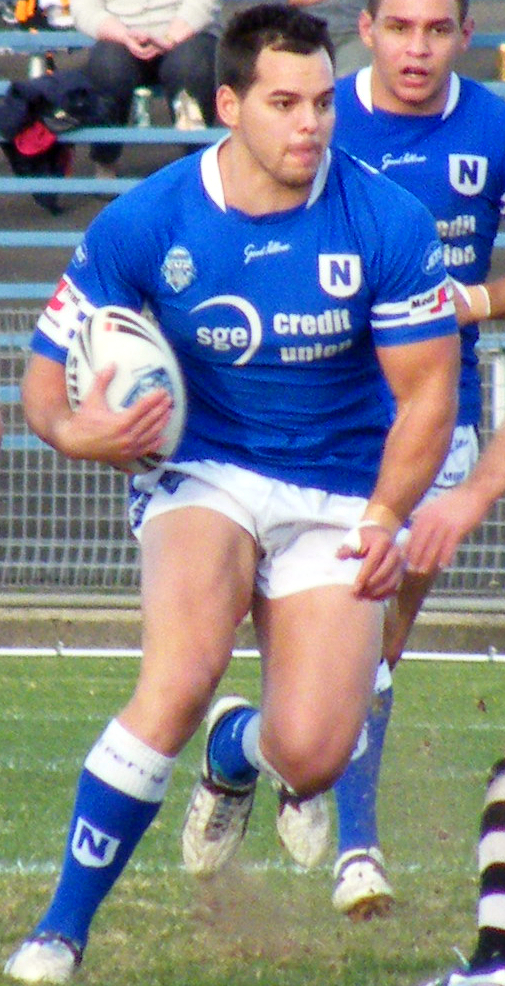

Personal information
- Full name: Ryan Verlinden
- Born: 18 February 1986 (age 39); Sydney, New South Wales, Australia
- Height: 6 ft 4 in (1.93 m)
- Weight: 18 st 10 lb (119 kg)

Playing information
- Position: Prop
Club
Years	Team	Pld	T	G	FG	P
2015	Featherstone Rovers	7	1	0	0	4
2015(loan)	→ Doncaster	7	1	0	0	4
2016–17	Workington Town	25	0	0	0	0
	Total	39	2	0	0	8
- Source: As of 1 January 2018

Ryan Verlinden (born 18 February 1986) is an Australian professional rugby league footballer who last played as a prop for Workington Town in the Kingstone Press Championship.

== Background ==
Verlinden was born in Sydney, Australia.

== Career ==
Verlinden has previously played for the Cronulla Sharks, North Sydney Bears and the Newtown Jets in the NSW Cup.
