= Siteni Taukamo =

Greece international rugby league footballer

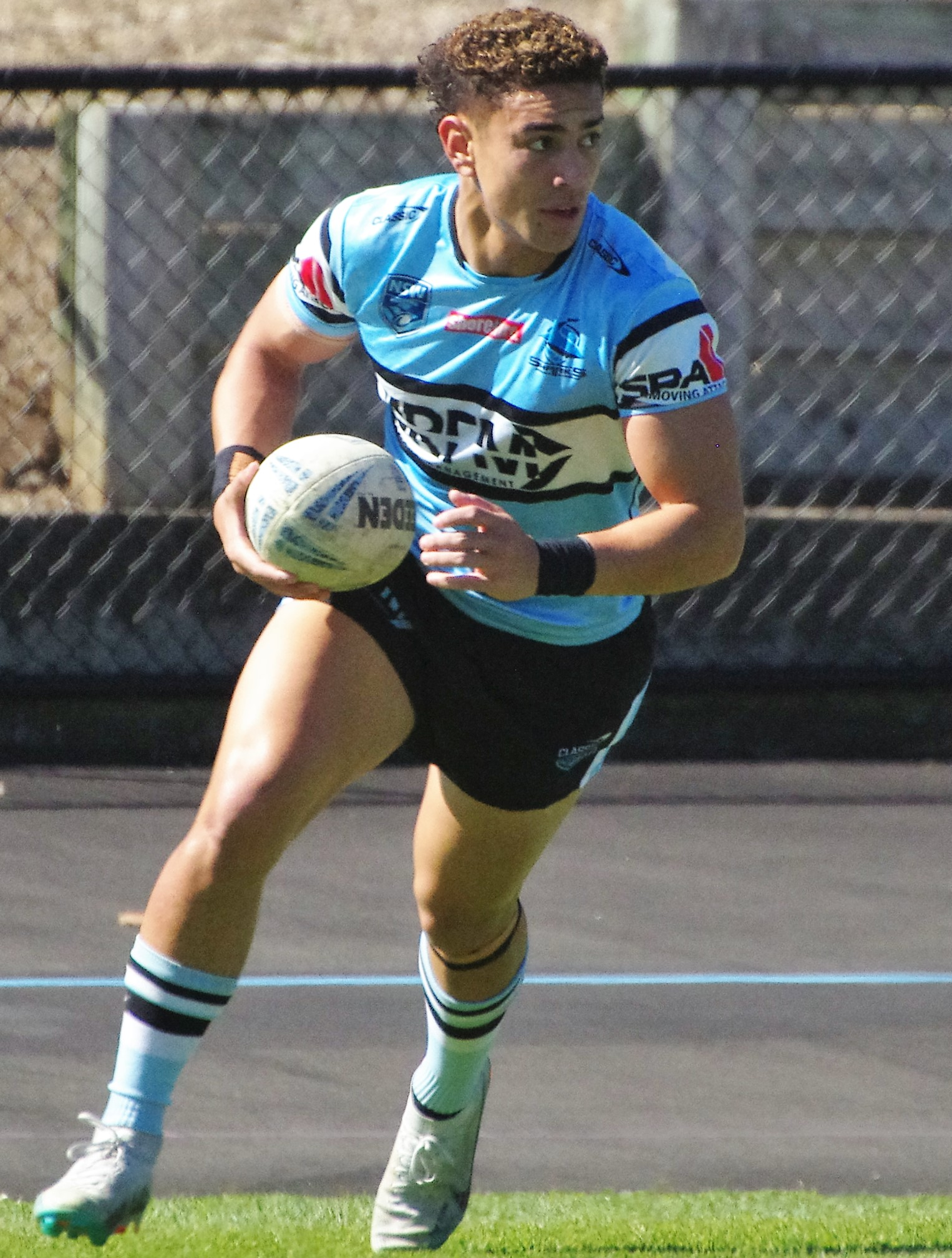

Personal information
- Born: 9 October 2004 (age 21) Australia
- Height: 185 cm (6 ft 1 in)
- Weight: 90 kg (14 st 2 lb)

Playing information
- Position: Wing, Fullback, Five-eighth
Club
Years	Team	Pld	T	G	FG	P
2024–	Cronulla Sharks	0	0	0	0	0
2025–	Newcastle Knights	0	0	0	0	0
	Total	0	0	0	0	0
Representative
Years	Team	Pld	T	G	FG	P
2022–	Greece	3	2	0	0	8
- Source: As of 30 October 2022

Siteni Taukamo (born 9 October 2004) is a Greece international rugby league footballer who has played as a winger or fullback for the Newcastle Knights in the NRL since 2025. Taukamo previously played for the Cronulla-Sutherland Sharks.

== Background ==
Taukamo is of Greek, Tongan and New Zealander descent. Growing up he also played rugby union at Newington College.

He played his junior rugby league for the Gymea Gorillas before being signed by the Cronulla-Sutherland Sharks. He is the younger brother of fellow Greek international, Tyrone Taukamo.

== Playing career ==
Taukamo captained the Sharks' Harold Matthews Cup squad during the 2020 and 2021 seasons. On 18 July 2020, Taukamo signed a four-year contract with the club until the end of 2024, transitioning into the first grade squad in 2023.

=== 2022 ===
In 2022, Taukamo was named in the Greece squad for the 2021 Rugby League World Cup, the first ever Greek rugby league squad to compete in a World Cup. Taukamo was initially left out of Greece's 24-man squad due to uncertainty around his age. In Greece's opening match, Taukamo made history by scoring the country's first ever World Cup try. In Greece's final group stage match, Taukamo scored their only try during a record 94-4 loss against England at Bramall Lane in Sheffield.

=== 2023 ===
Taukamo was part of the Sharks' top 30 squad for the 2023 NRL season.

=== 2024 ===
Taukamo knocked off ladder leaders' Parramatta in round 21 of 2024 NSW Cup season, playing in the No. 6 jersey coming up with an assist. In 2024 Taukamo was released by the Sharks to take up a deal with fellow NRL club the Newcastle Knights and was listed in their extended squad for the 2025 season.
