= Jesse Colquhoun =

Australian rugby league footballer

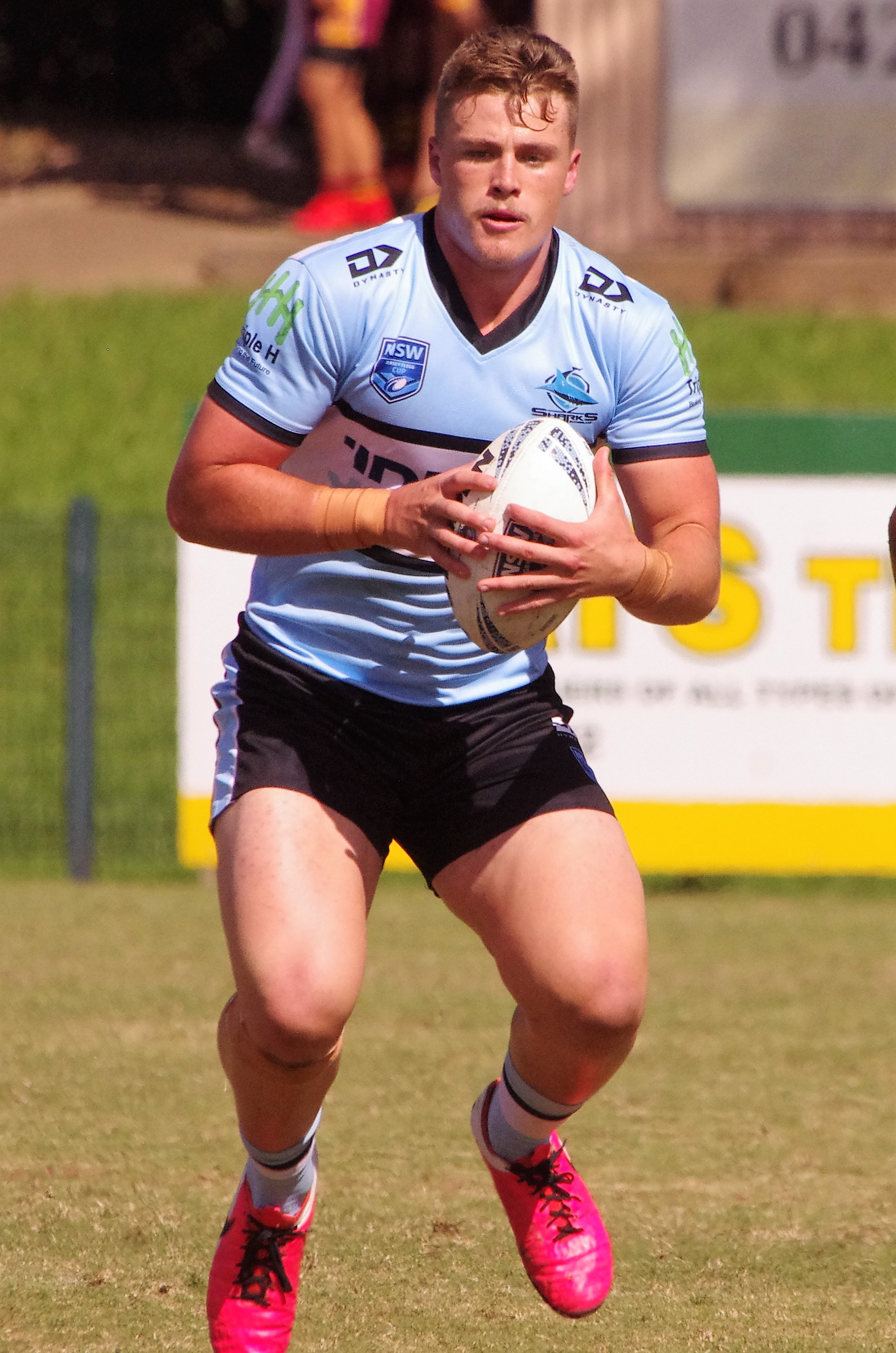

Personal information
- Born: 12 October 2001 (age 25) Wollongong, New South Wales, Australia
- Height: 190 cm (6 ft 3 in)
- Weight: 106 kg (16 st 10 lb)

Playing information
- Position: Lock
Club
Years	Team	Pld	T	G	FG	P
2022–	Cronulla Sharks	52	4	0	0	16
- Source: As of 19 September 2026

Jesse Colquhoun (born 12 October 2001) is an Australian professional rugby league footballer who plays as a prop or lock forward for the Cronulla-Sutherland Sharks in the National Rugby League.

== Background ==
Colquhoun played his junior football for the Collegians Rugby League Football club in Wollongong.

== Playing career ==
=== 2022 ===
In Round 18 of the 2022 NRL season, Colquhoun made his first grade debut for the Cronulla-Sutherland Sharks against the North Queensland Cowboys off the bench in a 26–12 victory.

=== 2023 ===
Colquhoun played a total of six games for Cronulla in the 2023 NRL season as Cronulla finished sixth on the table. Colquhoun played in the clubs 13-12 upset loss against the Sydney Roosters which ended their season.

=== 2024 ===
Colquhoun played only one game of the 2024 NRL season. He played in Cronulla's round 19 58-6 win against the Wests Tigers where he injured his ACL and was ruled out for the rest of the season.

=== 2025 ===
He played 18 games for Cronulla in the 2025 NRL season as the club finished 5th on the table. The club reached the preliminary final for a second consecutive season but lost against Melbourne 22-14.

=== 2026 ===
On 19 January, the Cronulla outfit announced that Colquhoun had re-signed with the club for a further four years. He played 23 games for Cronulla in the 2026 NRL season as the club finished 5th on the table and qualified for the finals.

== Statistics ==
=== NRL ===
Season	Team	Matches	T	G	GK %	F/G	Pts
2022	Cronulla-Sutherland	4	0	0	—	0	0
2023	Cronulla-Sutherland	6	0	0	—	0	0
2024	Cronulla-Sutherland	1	0	0			
2025	Cronulla-Sutherland	14	1				
2026	Cronulla-Sutherland	23	3				12
Career totals		52	4	0	—	0	16
