= Talanoa Penitani =

Australian rugby league footballer (born 2004)

Noa Penitani
Personal information
- Full name: Talanoa Penitani
- Born: 15 September 2004 (age 22) Sydney, New South Wales, Australia
- Height: 185 cm (6 ft 1 in)
- Weight: 94 kg (14 st 11 lb)

Playing information
- Position: Centre, Wing
Club
Years	Team	Pld	T	G	FG	P
2026	South Sydney	1	2	0	0	8
- Source: RLP

Talanoa Penitani (born 15 September 2004) is an Australian rugby league footballer for the South Sydney Rabbitohs in the National Rugby League (NRL).

== Early life ==
Penitani was born in Sydney and attended Endeavour Sports High School.

== Career ==
An outside back, Penitani played junior rugby league for the Matraville Tigers and had several years with the Cronulla Sharks' junior sides before moving to South Sydney in 2025. He had a strong season playing as a centre in the 2025 NSW Cup, to secure a development deal with the Rabbitohs, and made his first-grade debut against the North Queensland Cowboys in round 12 of the 2026 NRL season. Playing on the right wing, Penitani scored two tries on debut before suffering a hamstring injury in the final minute of play.

== Personal life ==
Penitani's sisters Natasha and Tiana both play in the NRLW. His brother-in-law, through marriage to Tania, is former Rabbitohs player Aaron Gray.
