= D'Rhys Miller =

Fiji international rugby league footballer

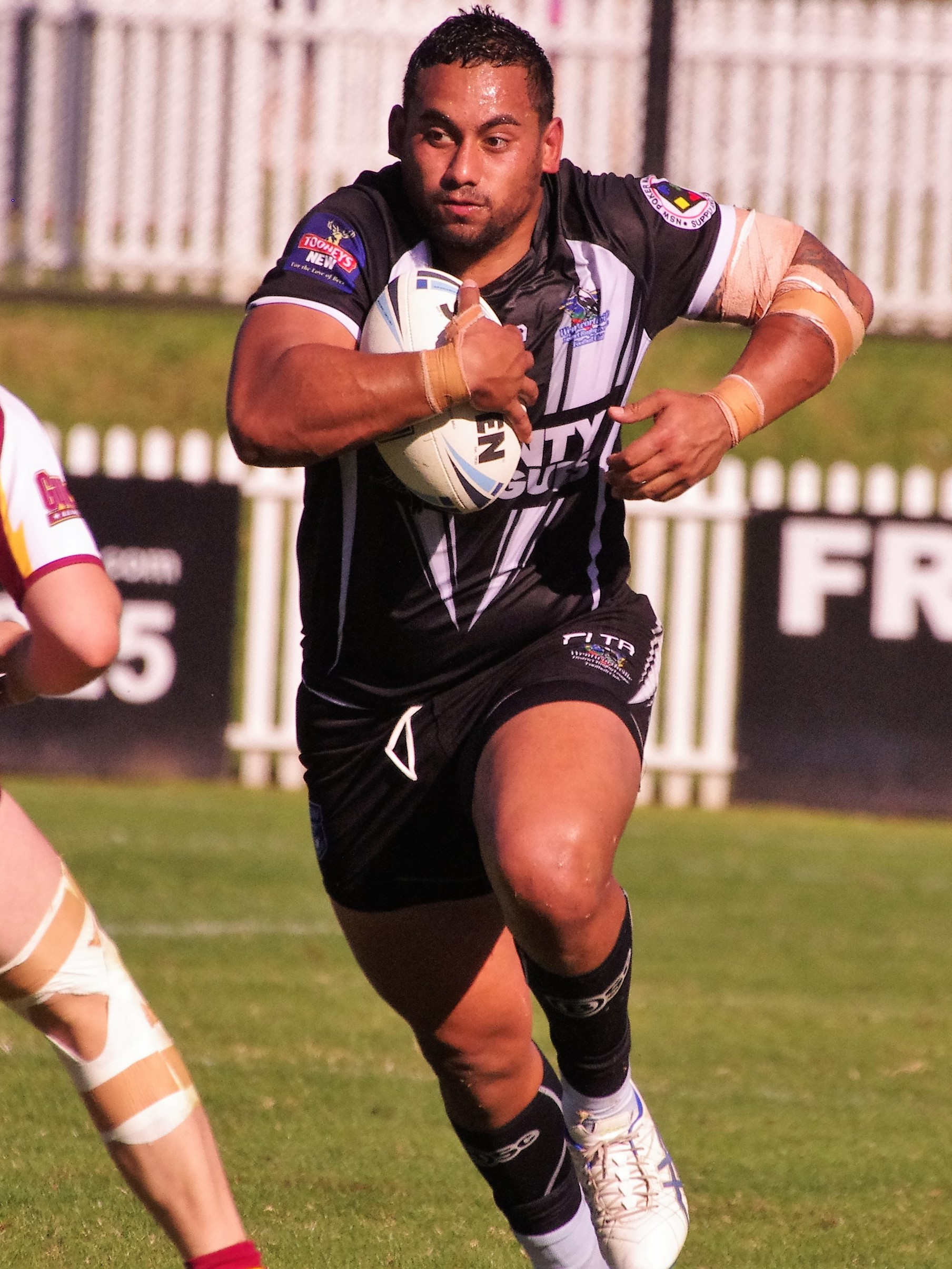

Personal information
- Full name: D'Rhys Miller
- Born: 26 June 1995 (age 31) Sydney, New South Wales, Australia

Playing information
- Position: Second-row
Representative
Years	Team	Pld	T	G	FG	P
2019	Fiji Prime Minister's XIII	1	0	0	0	0
2019–	Fiji	3	1	0	0	4
- Source: As of 10 November 2023

D'Rhys Miller is a Fiji international rugby league footballer who plays as a second-row forward for the Western Suburbs Magpies in the Canterbury Cup NSW.

== Career ==
Miller made his international debut for Fiji in their 56–14 victory vs Lebanon in the 2019 Pacific Test.

On 28 November 2019, Miller signed a contract to join Canterbury Cup NSW side North Sydney after departing Wentworthville.
