= Jensen Taumoepeau =

New Zealand rugby league footballer (born 2000)

Personal information
- Born: 21 June 2000 (age 26) New Plymouth, Taranaki, New Zealand
- Height: 193 cm (6 ft 4 in)
- Weight: 100 kg (15 st 10 lb)

Playing information
- Position: Wing, Centre
Club
Years	Team	Pld	T	G	FG	P
2026–	Gold Coast Titans	6	0	0	0	0
- Source: RLP

Jensen Taumoepeau (born 21 June 2000) is a New Zealand rugby league footballer for the Gold Coast Titans in the National Rugby League (NRL).

== Early life ==
Taumoepeau was born in New Plymouth, Taranaki, and is of both Māori and Tongan descent. He played schoolboy rugby union during his time at Francis Douglas Memorial College and got early exposure in rugby league with New Plymouth club the Western Suburbs Tigers.

== Career ==
Taumoepeau was scouted while playing a Māori youth tournament in Rotorua and competed in the 2016 Harold Matthews Cup with the South Sydney Rabbitohs.

An outside back, Taumoepeau left the Rabbitohs in 2017 and joined the Cronulla Sharks, where he featured in their SG Ball Cup and Jersey Flegg Cup sides. He remained with the Sharks until 2023, and while a regular for feeder club Newtown in the NSW Cup for his final two years, was unable to break into first-grade.

Taumoepeau's time in Cronulla was followed by successive single season stints with the North Queensland Cowboys and Canberra Raiders, in 2024 and 2025 respectively.

Prior to the 2026 NRL season, Taumoepeau was signed by the Gold Coast Titans on a two-year contract. At the age of 25, Taumoepeau made his first-grade debut as a winger in round 10 against the Sydney Roosters. He retained his place for a further five matches before being sidelined with a dislocated ankle.
