= 2018 Cronulla-Sutherland Sharks season =

- NRL rank: 4th
- 2018 record: Wins: 16; draws: 0; losses: 8
- Points scored: For: 519; against: 423

Team information
- CEO: Barry Russell
- Coach: Shane Flanagan
- Assistant coach: Jim Dymock
- Captain: Paul Gallen, Wade Graham
- Stadium: Shark Park
- Avg. attendance: 12,685

Top scorers
- Tries: Valentine Holmes (22)
- Goals: Chad Townsend (62)
- Points: Chad Townsend (148)
← 2017	2019 →

The 2018 Cronulla-Sutherland Sharks season was the 52nd in the club's history. Coached by Shane Flanagan and captained by Paul Gallen and Wade Graham, they competed in the National Rugby League's 2018 Telstra Premiership.

== Fixtures ==
=== Pre-season ===
Date	Round	Opponent	Venue	Result	Cro.	Opp.	Source
17 February	Trial Match	Manly-Warringah Sea Eagles	Southern Cross Group Stadium, Sydney	Win	30	14	
24 February	Trial Match	Wests Tigers	Campbelltown Stadium, Sydney	Win	24	12	

=== Regular season ===
Date	Round	Opponent	Venue	Result	Cro.	Opp.	Tries	Goals	Field Goals	Report
9 March	1	North Queensland Cowboys	1300SMILES Stadium, Townsville	Loss	14	20	Dugan, Segeyaro	Townsend 3/3		
15 March	2	St George Illawarra Dragons	Southern Cross Group Stadium, Sydney	Loss	16	20	Bukuya, Feki	Townsend 4/4		
24 March	3	Parramatta Eels	ANZ Stadium, Sydney	Win	14	4	Townsend	Townsend 5/5		
30 March	4	Melbourne Storm	Southern Cross Group Stadium, Sydney	Win	14	4	Lee	Townsend 5/5		
6 April	5	Sydney Roosters	Southern Cross Group Stadium, Sydney	Loss	10	28	Holmes (2)	Townsend 1/3		
13 April	6	St George Illawarra Dragons	WIN Stadium, Sydney	Loss	20	40	Brailey, Lee, Holmes, Leutele	Townsend 2/4		
22 April	7	Penrith Panthers	Southern Cross Group Stadium, Sydney	Win	26	22	Ramien (2), Holmes, Sorensen	Townsend 5/6		
28 April	8	Gold Coast Titans	Cbus Super Stadium, Gold Coast	Win	10	9	Holmes, Lee	Townsend 0/2	Townsend 2/2	
5 May	9	Parramatta Eels	Southern Cross Group Stadium, Sydney	Win	22	20	Feki (2), Townsend, Lee	Townsend 3/5		
13 May	10	Canberra Raiders	GIO Stadium, Canberra	Win	24	16	Holmes (2), Williams, Feki	Townsend 4/5		
20 May	11	Canterbury-Bankstown Bulldogs	Southern Cross Group Stadium, Sydney	Win	22	16	Lee, Holmes, Ramien, Matt Prior	Townsend 3/4		
27 May	12	Newcastle Knights	McDonald Jones Stadium, Newcastle	Win	48	10	Holmes (3), Ramien (2), Brailey, Dugan, Lee, Lewis	Townsend 6/10		
1 June	13	South Sydney Rabbitohs	ANZ Stadium, Sydney	Loss	14	22	Ramien, Katoa	Townsend 3/3		
10 June	14	Wests Tigers	Southern Cross Group Stadium, Sydney	Win	24	16	Gallen, Holmes, Lee, Ramien	Townsend 4/5		
16 June	15	Brisbane Broncos	Southern Cross Group Stadium, Sydney	Loss	16	20	Ramien, Leutele, Graham	Townsend 2/3		
29 June	16	New Zealand Warriors	Mt Smart Stadium, Auckland	Win	18	15	Lee (2), Ramien	Townsend 3/5		
	17	Bye								
13 July	18	Penrith Panthers	Panthers Stadium, Sydney	Win	24	12	Holmes (2), Katoa, Moylan	Townsend 4/4		
20 July	19	Canberra Raiders	Southern Cross Group Stadium, Sydney	Win	28	24	Fifita, Leutele, Holmes, Graham, Katoa	Townsend 4/6		
26 July	20	Brisbane Broncos	Suncorp Stadium, Brisbane	Loss	10	12	Holmes(2)	Townsend 1/2		
5 August	21	Manly-Warringah Sea Eagles	Southern Cross Group Stadium, Sydney	Loss	32	33	Graham, Holmes, Moylan, Ramien, Woods	Holmes 6/7		
12 August	22	Melbourne Storm	AAMI Park, Melbourne	Win	17	14	Brailey, Holmes, Dugan	Holmes 2/3	Townsend 1/1	
18 August	23	North Queensland Cowboys	Southern Cross Group Stadium, Sydney	Win	28	16	Lewis, Townsend, Fifita, Dugan, Bukuya	Holmes 4/5		
26 August	24	Newcastle Knights	Southern Cross Group Stadium, Sydney	Win	38	12	Lee(2), Dugan, Feki, Holmes, Townsend	Holmes4/5, Lee 1/1		
2 September	25	Canterbury-Bankstown Bulldogs	ANZ Stadium, Sydney	Win	30	18	Feki(2), Capewell, Fifita, Dugan, Holmes	Holmes 3/6		

=== Finals Series ===
Date	Week	Opponent	Venue	Result	Cro.	Opp.	Tries	Goals	Field Goals	Report
8 September	1	Sydney Roosters	Allianz Stadium, Sydney	Loss	12	21	Feki, Lee	Holmes 2/3		
14 September	2	Penrith Panthers	Allianz Stadium, Sydney	Win	21	20	Townsend, Holmes, Lewis	Holmes 4/5	Townsend 1/1	
14 September	2	Melbourne Storm	AAMI Park, Melbourne	Loss	6	22	Lewis	Holmes 1/1		

=== Ladder ===
2018 NRL season
Pos	Team	Pld	W	D	L	B	PF	PA	PD	Pts
1	Sydney Roosters	24	16	0	8	1	542	361	+181	34
2	Melbourne Storm	24	16	0	8	1	536	363	+173	34
3	South Sydney Rabbitohs	24	16	0	8	1	582	437	+145	34
4	Cronulla-Sutherland Sharks	24	16	0	8	1	519	423	+96	34
5	Penrith Panthers	24	15	0	9	1	517	461	+56	32
6	Brisbane Broncos	24	15	0	9	1	556	500	+56	32
7	St. George Illawarra Dragons	24	15	0	9	1	519	472	+47	32
8	New Zealand Warriors	24	15	0	9	1	472	447	+25	32
9	Wests Tigers	24	12	0	12	1	377	460	−83	26
10	Canberra Raiders	24	10	0	14	1	563	540	+23	22
11	Newcastle Knights	24	9	0	15	1	414	607	−193	20
12	Canterbury-Bankstown Bulldogs	24	8	0	16	1	428	474	−46	18
13	North Queensland Cowboys	24	8	0	16	1	449	521	−72	18
14	Gold Coast Titans	24	8	0	16	1	472	582	−110	18
15	Manly-Warringah Sea Eagles	24	7	0	17	1	500	622	−122	16
16	Parramatta Eels	24	6	0	18	1	374	550	−176	14

== Squad ==
Cronulla Sharks 2018 Squad
First team squad			Coaching staff
Blayke Brailey – HK; Jayden Brailey – HK; Jayson Bukuya – SR, LK; Kurt Capewell – SR, CE; Kurt Dillon – PR; Josh Dugan – FB, CE; Sosaia Feki – WG; Andrew Fifita (vc) – PR; Kyle Flanagan – HB, FE; Paul Gallen (c) – LK, PR; Wade Graham (c) – SR, LK	Aaron Gray – CE, WG; Valentine Holmes – WG, FB (gk); Sione Katoa – WG; William Kennedy – FB; Edrick Lee – WG; Ricky Leutele – CE; Luke Lewis – SR; Billy Magoulias – LK, SR; Matt Moylan – FE, FB; Briton Nikora – SR	Joseph Paulo – LK, SR; Matt Prior – PR, LK; Jesse Ramien – CE; James Segeyaro – HK; Ava Seumanufagai – PR; Scott Sorensen – SR; Chad Townsend – HB, FE (gk); Braden Uele – PR; Jack Williams – SR, LK; Aaron Woods – PR	Head coach: Shane Flanagan; Assistant coaches: Jim Dymock; John Morris; Legend: (c) Captain(s); (vc) Vice-captain(s); Injured; Updated: 16 July 2018; Source(s): Sharks 2018 Squad

== Player movements ==
Losses

- Gerard Beale to New Zealand Warriors
- Jack Bird to Brisbane Broncos
- Fa'amanu Brown to Canterbury-Bankstown Bulldogs
- Manaia Cherrington to New Zealand Warriors (mid-season)
- Jordan Drew to Townsville Blackhawks (mid-season)
- Chris Heighington to Newcastle Knights
- Malakai Houma to Newtown Jets
- Jaimin Jolliffe to Newtown Jets
- Jeremy Latimore to St George Illawarra Dragons
- James Maloney to Penrith Panthers
- Jayden McDonogh to Newtown Jets
- Daniel Mortimer to Leigh Centurions (mid season)
- Sam Tagataese to Brisbane Broncos
- Jayden Walker to Penrith Panthers
- Tony Williams to Parramatta Eels

Gains

- Josh Dugan from St George Illawarra Dragons
- Aaron Gray from South Sydney Rabbitohs
- Trent Hodkinson from Newcastle Knights
- Matt Moylan from Penrith Panthers
- James Segeyaro from Leeds Rhinos (mid-season)
- Ava Seumanufagai from Wests Tigers
- Scott Sorensen from Canberra Raiders
- Braden Uele from North Queensland Cowboys

== Representative honours ==
The following players have played a first grade representative match in 2018. (C) = Captain

Player	State of Origin 1	2018 Pacific Rugby League Tests	State of Origin 2	State of Origin 3	International Rugby League tests
Valentine Holmes	Queensland	-	Queensland	Queensland	Australia
James Segeyaro	-	Papua New Guinea (C)	—	—	—
Joseph Paulo	-	Samoa	—	—	—
Andrew Fifita	-	Tonga	—	—	Tonga
Matt Prior	-	-	New South Wales	—	—
Aaron Woods	-	-	-	-	Australia

== Squad statistics ==
Statistics Source: Statistics current as of Round 25

Name	App	T	G	FG	Pts
Jayden Brailey	23	3	0	0	12
Jayson Bukuya	18	2	0	0	8
Kurt Capewell	17	1	0	0	4
Kurt Dillon	5	0	0	0	0
Josh Dugan	13	6	0	0	24
Sosaia Feki	13	7	0	0	28
Andrew Fifita	23	3	0	0	12
Paul Gallen	20	1	0	0	4
Wade Graham	17	3	0	0	12
Aaron Gray	1	0	0	0	0
Trent Hodkinson	4	0	0	0	0
Valentine Holmes	23	21	21	0	126
Sione Katoa	9	3	0	0	12
Edrick Lee	16	11	1	0	46
Ricky Leutele	23	3	0	0	12
Luke Lewis	13	2	0	0	8
Matt Moylan	21	2	0	0	8
Joseph Paulo	20	0	0	0	0
Matt Prior	24	1	0	0	4
Jesse Ramien	18	10	0	0	40
James Segeyaro	23	1	0	0	4
Ava Seumanufagai	13	0	0	0	0
Scott Sorensen	12	1	0	0	4
Chad Townsend	24	4	62	3	143
Braden Uele	1	0	0	0	0
Jack Williams	4	1	0	0	4
Aaron Woods	9	1	0	0	4
Kyle Flanagan	1	0	0	0	0
28 Players used	—	87	84	3	519
