= 2019 Cronulla-Sutherland Sharks season =

- NRL Rank: 7th
- Play-off result: Elimination Finalist
- 2019 record: Wins: 12; draws: 0; losses: 12
- Points scored: For: 514; against: 464

Team information
- CEO: ~~Barry Russell~~ → Richard Munro
- Coach: John Morris
- Assistant coach: Jim Dymock
- Captains: Paul Gallen; Wade Graham
- Stadium: PointsBet Stadium
- Avg. attendance: 12,224

Top scorers
- Tries: Josh Morris (15)
- Goals: Shaun Johnson (45)
- Points: Shaun Johnson (102)
← 2018	2020 →

The 2019 Cronulla-Sutherland Sharks season was the 53rd in the club's history. The team was coached by John Morris, who replaced Shane Flanagan after he resigned in January. The Cronulla Sharks were captained by Paul Gallen and Wade Graham and competed in the National Rugby League's 2019 Telstra Premiership.

== Milestones ==
- Round 1: Josh Morris made his debut for the club, after previously playing for the Canterbury-Bankstown Bulldogs.
- Round 1: Shaun Johnson made his debut for the club, after previously playing for the New Zealand Warriors and kicked his 1st goal for the club.
- Round 1: Briton Nikora made his NRL debut for the club.
- Round 1: Blayke Brailey made his NRL debut for the club.
- Round 2: John Morris recorded his first victory as head coach.
- Round 2: Chad Townsend played his 100th game for the club.
- Round 2: Briton Nikora scored his 1st career try.
- Round 3: Paul Gallen played his 329th career and club game, eclipsing Andrew Ettingshausen's all-time games record of 328 games.
- Round 3: Josh Morris scored his 1st try for the club.
- Round 3: Blayke Brailey scored his 1st career try.
- Round 4: Bronson Xerri made his NRL debut for the club.
- Round 4: Kyle Flanagan kicked his 1st NRL goal for the club.
- Round 5: Jayden Brailey played his 50th career game.
- Round 6: William Kennedy made his NRL debut for the club.
- Round 6: Bronson Xerri scored his 1st career try.
- Round 7: Ronaldo Mulitalo made his NRL debut for the club.
- Round 8: Braden Hamlin-Uele scored his 1st career try.
- Round 9: Aaron Gray scored his 1st try for the club.
- Round 9: Paul Gallen kicked his 1st NRL goal for the club.
- Round 10: Andrew Fifita played his 200th career game.
- Round 11: Chad Townsend played his 150th career game.
- Round 11: Kurt Capewell played his 50th career game.
- Round 13: Kyle Flanagan scored his 1st career try.
- Round 19: Billy Magoulias made his NRL debut for the club.
- Round 19: Ronaldo Mulitalo scored his 1st career try.
- Round 25: Paul Gallen kicked his 1st NRL field goal for the club.

== Fixtures ==
=== Pre-season ===
Date	Round	Opponent	Venue	Result	Cro.	Opp.	Tries	Goals	Field Goals	Report
23 February	Trial Match	Manly-Warringah Sea Eagles	Shark Park, Sydney	Win	28	22	Mulitalo (2), Morris, Xerri, Katoa	Flanagan 4/5		
Team Details: FB / 1 / William Kennedy; WG / 2 / Sosaia Feki; CE / 3 / Bronson Xerri; CE / 4 / Josh Morris; WG / 5 / Sione Katoa; FE / 6 / Kyle Flanagan; HB / 7 / Chad Townsend; PR / 8 / Ava Seumanufagai; HK / 9 / Blayke Brailey; PR / 10 / Braden Hamlin-Uele; SR / 11 / Briton Nikora; SR / 12 / Scott Sorensen; LK / 13 / Jack Williams; Interchange: IC / 14 / Jaimin Jolliffe; IC / 15 / Billy Magoulias; IC / 16 / Braydon Trindall; IC / 17 / Cruz Topai-Aveai; IC / 18 / Ronaldo Mulitalo; IC / 19 / Daniel Vasquez; IC / 20 / Luke Polselli; IC / 21 / Isaac Lumelume; IC / 22 / Jackson Ferris; IC / 23 / Jack A Williams; IC / 24 / Teig Wilton; IC / 25 / Josh Carr; Coach: / / John Morris
2 March	Trial Match	Newcastle Knights	Maitland Sports Ground, Newcastle	Win	30	6	Dugan, Morris, Fifita, Katoa, Townsend	Johnson 4/4, Flanagan 1/1		
Team Details: FB / 1 / Matt Moylan; WG / 2 / Sosaia Feki; CE / 3 / Josh Dugan; CE / 4 / Josh Morris; WG / 5 / Sione Katoa; FE / 6 / Shaun Johnson; HB / 7 / Chad Townsend; PR / 8 / Andrew Fifita; HK / 9 / Jayden Brailey; PR / 10 / Matt Prior; SR / 11 / Briton Nikora; SR / 12 / Kurt Capewell; LK / 13 / Paul Gallen (c); Interchange: IC / 14 / Jayson Bukuya; IC / 15 / Jack Williams; IC / 16 / Aaron Woods; IC / 17 / Scott Sorensen; IC / 18 / Bronson Xerri; IC / 19 / Kyle Flanagan; IC / 20 / Billy Magoulias; IC / 21 / Ronaldo Mulitalo; IC / 22 / William Kennedy; Coach: / / John Morris

=== Regular season ===
Date	Round	Opponent	Venue	Result	Cro.	Opp.	Tries	Goals	Field Goals	Report
15 March	1	Newcastle Knights	McDonald Jones Stadium, Newcastle	Loss	8	14	Katoa	Johnson 2/2		
Team Details: FB / 1 / Matt Moylan; WG / 2 / Sosaia Feki; CE / 3 / Josh Dugan; CE / 4 / Josh Morris; WG / 5 / Sione Katoa; FE / 6 / Shaun Johnson; HB / 7 / Chad Townsend; PR / 8 / Andrew Fifita; HK / 9 / Jayden Brailey; PR / 10 / Matt Prior; SR / 11 / Briton Nikora; SR / 12 / Kurt Capewell; LK / 13 / Paul Gallen (c); Interchange: IC / 14 / Blayke Brailey; IC / 15 / Jayson Bukuya; IC / 16 / Aaron Woods; IC / 17 / Jack Williams; Reserves: RE / 18 / Scott Sorensen; RE / 19 / Kyle Flanagan; RE / 20 / Bronson Xerri; RE / 21 / Braden Hamlin-Uele; Coach: / / John Morris
23 March	2	Gold Coast Titans	Shark Park, Sydney	Win	20	6	Katoa (2), Dugan, Nikora	Johnson 2/4		
Team Details: FB / 1 / Matt Moylan; WG / 2 / Sosaia Feki; CE / 3 / Josh Dugan; CE / 4 / Josh Morris; WG / 5 / Sione Katoa; FE / 6 / Shaun Johnson; HB / 7 / Chad Townsend; PR / 8 / Andrew Fifita; HK / 9 / Jayden Brailey; PR / 10 / Matt Prior; SR / 11 / Briton Nikora; SR / 12 / Kurt Capewell; LK / 13 / Paul Gallen (c); Interchange: IC / 14 / Blayke Brailey; IC / 15 / Jayson Bukuya; IC / 16 / Aaron Woods; IC / 17 / Jack Williams; Reserves: RE / 18 / Scott Sorensen; RE / 19 / Kyle Flanagan; RE / 20 / Bronson Xerri; RE / 21 / Braden Hamlin-Uele; Coach: / / John Morris
30 March	3	North Queensland Cowboys	1300SMILES Stadium, Townsville	Win	42	16	Townsend (2), Morris (2), Nikora, Dugan, B. Brailey	Johnson 7/7		
Team Details: FB / 1 / Matt Moylan; WG / 2 / Sosaia Feki; CE / 3 / Josh Dugan; CE / 4 / Josh Morris; WG / 5 / Sione Katoa; FE / 6 / Shaun Johnson; HB / 7 / Chad Townsend; PR / 8 / Andrew Fifita; HK / 9 / Jayden Brailey; PR / 10 / Matt Prior; SR / 11 / Briton Nikora; SR / 12 / Kurt Capewell; LK / 13 / Paul Gallen (c); Interchange: IC / 14 / Blayke Brailey; IC / 15 / Jayson Bukuya; IC / 16 / Aaron Woods; IC / 17 / Jack Williams; Reserves: RE / 18 / Scott Sorensen; RE / 19 / Kyle Flanagan; RE / 20 / Bronson Xerri; RE / 21 / Braden Hamlin-Uele; Coach: / / John Morris
6 April	4	Parramatta Eels	ANZ Stadium, Sydney	Loss	12	24	Feki (2)	Flanagan 2/2		
Team Details: FB / 1 / Josh Dugan; WG / 2 / Sosaia Feki; CE / 3 / Bronson Xerri; CE / 4 / Josh Morris; WG / 5 / Sione Katoa; FE / 19 / Kyle Flanagan; HB / 7 / Chad Townsend; PR / 8 / Andrew Fifita (c); HK / 9 / Jayden Brailey; PR / 10 / Matt Prior; SR / 11 / Briton Nikora; SR / 12 / Kurt Capewell; LK / 15 / Jayson Bukuya; Interchange: IC / 14 / Blayke Brailey; IC / 16 / Aaron Woods; IC / 17 / Jack Williams; IC / 18 / Scott Sorensen; Reserves: RE / 6 / Shaun Johnson; RE / 13 / Paul Gallen; RE / 20 / Aaron Gray; RE / 21 / Braden Hamlin-Uele; Coach: / / John Morris
13 April	5	Sydney Roosters	PointsBet Stadium, Sydney	Loss	16	30	Morris, Johnson, Williams	Townsend 2/3		
Team Details: FB / 1 / Josh Dugan; WG / 2 / Sosaia Feki; CE / 3 / Bronson Xerri; CE / 4 / Josh Morris; WG / 5 / Sione Katoa; FE / 6 / Shaun Johnson; HB / 7 / Chad Townsend; PR / 8 / Andrew Fifita (c); HK / 9 / Jayden Brailey; PR / 10 / Matt Prior; SR / 11 / Briton Nikora; SR / 12 / Kurt Capewell; LK / 16 / Jack Williams; Interchange: IC / 14 / Blayke Brailey; IC / 15 / Jayson Bukuya; IC / 17 / Scott Sorensen; IC / 20 / Braden Hamlin-Uele; Reserves: RE / 13 / Paul Gallen; RE / 18 / Kyle Flanagan; RE / 19 / William Kennedy; RE / 21 / Aaron Gray; Coach: / / John Morris
18 April	6	Penrith Panthers	PointsBet Stadium, Sydney	Win	24	20	Xerri, Townsend, Fifita, Dugan	Townsend 4/4		
Team Details: FB / 19 / William Kennedy; WG / 2 / Sosaia Feki; CE / 3 / Bronson Xerri; CE / 4 / Josh Morris; WG / 1 / Josh Dugan; FE / 6 / Shaun Johnson; HB / 7 / Chad Townsend; PR / 8 / Andrew Fifita; HK / 9 / Jayden Brailey; PR / 10 / Matt Prior; SR / 11 / Briton Nikora; SR / 12 / Kurt Capewell; LK / 13 / Paul Gallen (c); Interchange: IC / 14 / Blayke Brailey; IC / 16 / Jack Williams; IC / 17 / Scott Sorensen; IC / 20 / Braden Hamlin-Uele; Reserves: RE / 5 / Sione Katoa; RE / 15 / Jayson Bukuya; RE / 18 / Kyle Flanagan; RE / 21 / Aaron Gray; Coach: / / John Morris
27 April	7	Brisbane Broncos	Suncorp Stadium, Brisbane	Loss	6	29	J. Brailey	Townsend 1/1		
Team Details: FB / 1 / William Kennedy; WG / 2 / Sosaia Feki; CE / 3 / Bronson Xerri; CE / 4 / Josh Morris; WG / 18 / Ronaldo Mulitalo; FE / 6 / Shaun Johnson; HB / 7 / Chad Townsend; PR / 8 / Andrew Fifita; HK / 9 / Jayden Brailey; PR / 10 / Matt Prior; SR / 11 / Scott Sorensen; SR / 12 / Kurt Capewell; LK / 13 / Paul Gallen (c); Interchange: IC / 14 / Blayke Brailey; IC / 15 / Jayson Bukuya; IC / 16 / Jack Williams; IC / 17 / Braden Hamlin-Uele; Reserves: RE / 5 / Josh Dugan; RE / 19 / Kyle Flanagan; RE / 20 / Sione Katoa; RE / 21 / Billy Magoulias; Coach: / / John Morris
3 May	8	Melbourne Storm	PointsBet Stadium, Sydney	Win	20	18	Katoa, Nikora, Hamlin-Uele	Flanagan 4/5		
Team Details: FB / 21 / Josh Dugan; WG / 20 / Aaron Gray; CE / 3 / Bronson Xerri; CE / 4 / Josh Morris; WG / 5 / Sione Katoa; FE / 6 / Kyle Flanagan; HB / 7 / Chad Townsend; PR / 8 / Andrew Fifita; HK / 9 / Jayden Brailey; PR / 10 / Matt Prior; SR / 11 / Briton Nikora; SR / 12 / Kurt Capewell; LK / 13 / Paul Gallen (c); Interchange: IC / 14 / Blayke Brailey; IC / 15 / Jayson Bukuya; IC / 16 / Jack Williams; IC / 17 / Braden Hamlin-Uele; Reserves: RE / 1 / William Kennedy; RE / 2 / Sosaia Feki; RE / 18 / Scott Sorensen; RE / 19 / Ronaldo Mulitalo; Coach: / / John Morris
9 May	9	Gold Coast Titans	Suncorp Stadium, Brisbane	Win	26	18	Morris (2), Gray (2), Gallen	Flanagan 2/5, Gallen 1/1		
Team Details: FB / 1 / Josh Dugan; WG / 2 / Sosaia Feki; CE / 3 / Bronson Xerri; CE / 4 / Josh Morris; WG / 5 / Aaron Gray; FE / 6 / Kyle Flanagan; HB / 7 / Chad Townsend; PR / 8 / Andrew Fifita; HK / 9 / Jayden Brailey; PR / 10 / Matt Prior; SR / 11 / Briton Nikora; SR / 12 / Kurt Capewell; LK / 13 / Paul Gallen (c); Interchange: IC / 14 / Blayke Brailey; IC / 15 / Jayson Bukuya; IC / 16 / Jack Williams; IC / 17 / Braden Hamlin-Uele; Reserves: RE / 18 / Scott Sorensen; RE / 19 / Sione Katoa; RE / 20 / Billy Magoulias; RE / 21 / William Kennedy; Coach: / / John Morris
19 May	10	Manly Sea Eagles	PointsBet Stadium, Sydney	Loss	14	24	Xerri, Hamlin-Uele, Feki	Flanagan 1/3		
Team Details: FB / 1 / Josh Dugan; WG / 2 / Sosaia Feki; CE / 3 / Bronson Xerri; CE / 4 / Josh Morris; WG / 5 / Aaron Gray; FE / 6 / Kyle Flanagan; HB / 7 / Chad Townsend; PR / 8 / Andrew Fifita; HK / 9 / Jayden Brailey; PR / 10 / Matt Prior; SR / 11 / Briton Nikora; SR / 12 / Kurt Capewell; LK / 13 / Paul Gallen (c); Interchange: IC / 14 / Blayke Brailey; IC / 15 / Jayson Bukuya; IC / 16 / Jack Williams; IC / 17 / Braden Hamlin-Uele; Reserves: RE / 18 / Scott Sorensen; RE / 19 / Sione Katoa; RE / 20 / Billy Magoulias; RE / 21 / William Kennedy; Coach: / / John Morris
26 May	11	St George Illawarra Dragons	WIN Stadium, Sydney	Win	22	9	Xerri (3), B. Brailey	Flanagan 2/3, Gallen 1/1		
Team Details: FB / 21 / Matt Moylan; WG / 2 / Sosaia Feki; CE / 3 / Bronson Xerri; CE / 4 / Josh Morris; WG / 1 / Josh Dugan; FE / 6 / Kyle Flanagan; HB / 7 / Chad Townsend; PR / 8 / Andrew Fifita; HK / 9 / Jayden Brailey; PR / 10 / Matt Prior; SR / 11 / Briton Nikora; SR / 12 / Kurt Capewell; LK / 13 / Paul Gallen (c); Interchange: IC / 14 / Blayke Brailey; IC / 15 / Jayson Bukuya; IC / 16 / Jack Williams; IC / 17 / Braden Hamlin-Uele; Reserves: RE / 5 / Aaron Gray; RE / 18 / Scott Sorensen; RE / 19 / Sione Katoa; RE / 20 / Billy Magoulias; Coach: / / John Morris
	12	Bye								
8 June	13	Parramatta Eels	PointsBet Stadium, Sydney	Win	42	22	Xerri (2), Fifita, Dugan, Townsend, Flanagan, Gray	Flanagan 7/8		
Team Details: FB / 1 / Matt Moylan; WG / 2 / Sosaia Feki; CE / 3 / Bronson Xerri; CE / 4 / Josh Dugan; WG / 5 / Aaron Gray; FE / 6 / Kyle Flanagan; HB / 7 / Chad Townsend; PR / 8 / Andrew Fifita; HK / 9 / Jayden Brailey; PR / 10 / Matt Prior; SR / 11 / Briton Nikora; SR / 12 / Kurt Capewell; LK / 13 / Paul Gallen (c); Interchange: IC / 15 / Jayson Bukuya; IC / 16 / Jack Williams; IC / 17 / Braden Hamlin-Uele; IC / 20 / Wade Graham (c); Reserves: RE / 14 / Blayke Brailey; RE / 18 / Scott Sorensen; RE / 19 / Sione Katoa; RE / 21 / Shaun Johnson; Coach: / / John Morris
13 June	14	Canberra Raiders	GIO Stadium, Canberra	Loss	20	22	Dugan (2), Morris, Hamlin-Uele	Johnson 2/4		
Team Details: FB / 1 / Matt Moylan; WG / 2 / Sosaia Feki; CE / 3 / Bronson Xerri; CE / 4 / Josh Morris; WG / 5 / Josh Dugan; FE / 21 / Shaun Johnson; HB / 7 / Chad Townsend; PR / 8 / Andrew Fifita; HK / 9 / Blayke Brailey; PR / 10 / Matt Prior; SR / 11 / Briton Nikora; SR / 12 / Kurt Capewell; LK / 13 / Paul Gallen (c); Interchange: IC / 14 / Wade Graham (c); IC / 15 / Jayson Bukuya; IC / 16 / Jack Williams; IC / 17 / Braden Hamlin-Uele; Reserves: RE / 6 / Kyle Flanagan; RE / 18 / Aaron Gray; RE / 19 / Scott Sorensen; RE / 20 / Billy Magoulias; Coach: / / John Morris
30 June	15	Canterbury-Bankstown Bulldogs	ANZ Stadium, Sydney	Loss	12	14	Feki, Johnson, Dugan	Johnson 0/3		
Team Details: FB / 1 / Matt Moylan; WG / 2 / Sosaia Feki; CE / 3 / Bronson Xerri; CE / 4 / Josh Morris; WG / 5 / Josh Dugan; FE / 6 / Shaun Johnson; HB / 7 / Chad Townsend; PR / 16 / Jack Williams; HK / 9 / Jayden Brailey; PR / 10 / Matt Prior; SR / 11 / Briton Nikora; SR / 12 / Wade Graham (c); LK / 13 / Paul Gallen (c); Interchange: IC / 8 / Braden Hamlin-Uele; IC / 15 / Jayson Bukuya; IC / 17 / Kurt Capewell; IC / 21 / Aaron Woods; Reserves: RE / 14 / Blayke Brailey; RE / 18 / Scott Sorensen; RE / 19 / Kyle Flanagan; RE / 20 / Aaron Gray; Coach: / / John Morris
7 July	16	Brisbane Broncos	PointsBet Stadium, Sydney	Loss	22	24	Morris (3), Dugan, Townsend	Townsend 0/4, Flanagan 1/1		
Team Details: FB / 1 / Matt Moylan; WG / 2 / Sosaia Feki; CE / 3 / Bronson Xerri; CE / 4 / Josh Morris; WG / 5 / Josh Dugan; FE / 6 / Shaun Johnson; HB / 7 / Chad Townsend; PR / 8 / Aaron Woods; HK / 9 / Jayden Brailey; PR / 10 / Matt Prior; SR / 11 / Briton Nikora; SR / 12 / Kurt Capewell; LK / 13 / Paul Gallen (c); Interchange: IC / 14 / Kyle Flanagan; IC / 15 / Jayson Bukuya; IC / 16 / Jack Williams; IC / 17 / Braden Hamlin-Uele; Reserves: RE / 18 / Blayke Brailey; RE / 19 / Scott Sorensen; RE / 20 / Billy Magoulias; RE / 21 / Aaron Gray; Coach: / / John Morris
13 July	17	Melbourne Storm	AAMI Park, Melbourne	Loss	14	40	Gray, Capewell, Johnson	Johnson 2/3		
Team Details: FB / 20 / Aaron Gray; WG / 2 / Sosaia Feki; CE / 3 / Bronson Xerri; CE / 4 / Josh Dugan; WG / 5 / Josh Morris; FE / 6 / Shaun Johnson; HB / 7 / Chad Townsend; PR / 8 / Andrew Fifita (c); HK / 9 / Jayden Brailey; PR / 16 / Aaron Woods; SR / 11 / Briton Nikora; SR / 14 / Kurt Capewell; LK / 10 / Matt Prior; Interchange: IC / 13 / Jack Williams; IC / 15 / Jayson Bukuya; IC / 17 / Braden Hamlin-Uele; IC / 21 / Blayke Brailey; Reserves: RE / 1 / Matt Moylan; RE / 12 / Wade Graham; RE / 18 / Billy Magoulias; RE / 19 / Kyle Flanagan; Coach: / / John Morris
19 July	18	New Zealand Warriors	Westpac Stadium, Wellington	Loss	18	19	Nikora, Townsend, Feki	Johnson 3/3		
Team Details: FB / 1 / Matt Moylan; WG / 2 / Sosaia Feki; CE / 3 / Bronson Xerri; CE / 4 / Kurt Capewell; WG / 21 / Ronaldo Mulitalo; FE / 6 / Shaun Johnson; HB / 7 / Chad Townsend; PR / 8 / Aaron Woods; HK / 9 / Jayden Brailey; PR / 10 / Aaron Woods; SR / 11 / Briton Nikora; SR / 12 / Scott Sorensen; LK / 13 / Paul Gallen (c); Interchange: IC / 14 / Blayke Brailey; IC / 15 / Jack Williams; IC / 16 / Braden Hamlin-Uele; IC / 17 / Matt Prior; Reserves: RE / 5 / Aaron Gray; RE / 18 / Billy Magoulias; RE / 19 / Kyle Flanagan; RE / 20 / William Kennedy; Coach: / / John Morris
25 July	19	North Queensland Cowboys	PointsBet Stadium, Sydney	Win	16	14	Mulitalo, Dugan, Xerri	Johnson 2/3		
Team Details: FB / 1 / Josh Dugan; WG / 2 / Sosaia Feki; CE / 3 / Bronson Xerri; CE / 4 / Josh Morris; WG / 5 / Ronaldo Mulitalo; FE / 6 / Shaun Johnson; HB / 7 / Chad Townsend; PR / 16 / Matt Prior; HK / 9 / Jayden Brailey; PR / 10 / Aaron Woods; SR / 11 / Briton Nikora; SR / 12 / Kurt Capewell; LK / 13 / Paul Gallen (c); Interchange: IC / 8 / Braden Hamlin-Uele; IC / 14 / Blayke Brailey; IC / 15 / Jack Williams; IC / 17 / Billy Magoulias; Reserves: RE / 18 / Jayson Bukuya; RE / 19 / Kyle Flanagan; RE / 20 / Scott Sorensen; RE / 21 / Sione Katoa; Coach: / / John Morris
3 August	20	South Sydney Rabbitohs	PointsBet Stadium, Sydney	Win	39	24	Xerri (2), Mulitalo, Dugan, Morris, Nikora	Johnson 7/8	Townsend 1/1	
Team Details: FB / 1 / Matt Moylan; WG / 20 / Ronaldo Mulitalo; CE / 3 / Bronson Xerri; CE / 4 / Josh Dugan; WG / 5 / Josh Morris; FE / 6 / Shaun Johnson; HB / 7 / Chad Townsend; PR / 8 / Aaron Woods; HK / 9 / Jayden Brailey; PR / 10 / Matt Prior; SR / 11 / Briton Nikora; SR / 12 / Wade Graham (c); LK / 13 / Paul Gallen (c); Interchange: IC / 14 / Kurt Capewell; IC / 15 / Jack Williams; IC / 16 / Andrew Fifita; IC / 17 / Braden Hamlin-Uele; Reserves: RE / 2 / Sosaia Feki; RE / 18 / Scott Sorensen; RE / 19 / Blayke Brailey; RE / 21 / Kyle Flanagan; Coach: / / John Morris
9 August	21	Penrith Panthers	Panthers Stadium, Sydney	Loss	20	26	Graham, Williams, Morris, Feki	Johnson 2/4		
Team Details: FB / 1 / Josh Dugan; WG / 2 / Sosaia Feki; CE / 3 / Bronson Xerri; CE / 4 / Josh Morris; WG / 5 / Ronaldo Mulitalo; FE / 6 / Shaun Johnson; HB / 7 / Chad Townsend; PR / 8 / Aaron Woods; HK / 9 / Jayden Brailey; PR / 10 / Matt Prior; SR / 11 / Briton Nikora; SR / 12 / Wade Graham (c); LK / 13 / Paul Gallen (c); Interchange: IC / 14 / Kurt Capewell; IC / 15 / Jack Williams; IC / 16 / Andrew Fifita; IC / 17 / Braden Hamlin-Uele; Reserves: RE / 18 / Billy Magoulias; RE / 19 / Blayke Brailey; RE / 20 / Sione Katoa; RE / 21 / Kyle Flanagan; Coach: / / John Morris
18 August	22	St George Illawarra Dragons	PointsBet Stadium, Sydney	Win	18	12	Woods, Feki, Xerri	Johnson 3/3		
Team Details: FB / 1 / Matt Moylan; WG / 2 / Sosaia Feki; CE / 3 / Bronson Xerri; CE / 4 / Josh Dugan; WG / 5 / Josh Morris; FE / 6 / Shaun Johnson; HB / 7 / Chad Townsend; PR / 8 / Aaron Woods; HK / 9 / Jayden Brailey; PR / 10 / Matt Prior; SR / 11 / Briton Nikora; SR / 12 / Wade Graham (c); LK / 13 / Paul Gallen (c); Interchange: IC / 14 / Kurt Capewell; IC / 15 / Jack Williams; IC / 16 / Billy Magoulias; IC / 17 / Braden Hamlin-Uele; Reserves: RE / 18 / Jayson Bukuya; RE / 19 / Blayke Brailey; RE / 20 / Ronaldo Mulitalo; RE / 21 / Kyle Flanagan; Coach: / / John Morris
24 August	23	New Zealand Warriors	PointsBet Stadium, Sydney	Win	42	16	Morris (2), Xerri, Dugan, Nikora, Hamlin-Uele, Mulitalo	Johnson 7/7		
Team Details: FB / 1 / Josh Dugan; WG / 2 / Sosaia Feki; CE / 3 / Bronson Xerri; CE / 4 / Josh Morris; WG / 5 / Ronaldo Mulitalo; FE / 6 / Shaun Johnson; HB / 7 / Chad Townsend; PR / 8 / Aaron Woods; HK / 9 / Jayden Brailey; PR / 10 / Matt Prior; SR / 11 / Briton Nikora; SR / 12 / Wade Graham (c); LK / 13 / Paul Gallen (c); Interchange: IC / 14 / Kurt Capewell; IC / 15 / Jack Williams; IC / 16 / Andrew Fifita; IC / 17 / Braden Hamlin-Uele; Reserves: RE / 18 / Billy Magoulias; RE / 19 / Blayke Brailey; RE / 20 / Sione Katoa; RE / 21 / Kyle Flanagan; Coach: / / John Morris
1 September	24	Canberra Raiders	PointsBet Stadium, Sydney	Loss	14	15	Mulitalo (2), J. Brailey	Flanagan 0/3	Townsend 2/2	
Team Details: FB / 1 / Josh Dugan; WG / 2 / Sione Katoa; CE / 3 / Bronson Xerri; CE / 4 / Josh Morris; WG / 5 / Ronaldo Mulitalo; FE / 20 / Kyle Flanagan; HB / 7 / Chad Townsend; PR / 8 / Aaron Woods; HK / 9 / Jayden Brailey; PR / 10 / Matt Prior; SR / 11 / Briton Nikora; SR / 12 / Wade Graham (c); LK / 13 / Paul Gallen (c); Interchange: IC / 14 / Kurt Capewell; IC / 15 / Braden Hamlin-Uele; IC / 16 / Andrew Fifita; IC / 17 / Jayson Bukuya; Reserves: RE / 6 / Shaun Johnson; RE / 18 / Billy Magoulias; RE / 19 / Blayke Brailey; RE / 21 / Matt Moylan; Coach: / / John Morris
8 September	25	Wests Tigers	Leichhardt Oval, Sydney	Win	25	8	Feki (2), Nikora, Morris	Johnson 4/5	Gallen 1/1	
Team Details: FB / 1 / Josh Dugan; WG / 2 / Sosaia Feki; CE / 3 / Bronson Xerri; CE / 4 / Josh Morris; WG / 5 / Ronaldo Mulitalo; FE / 6 / Shaun Johnson; HB / 7 / Chad Townsend; PR / 16 / Andrew Fifita; HK / 9 / Jayden Brailey; PR / 10 / Matt Prior; SR / 11 / Briton Nikora; SR / 12 / Wade Graham (c); LK / 13 / Paul Gallen (c); Interchange: IC / 8 / Aaron Woods; IC / 14 / Kurt Capewell; IC / 15 / Jack Williams; IC / 17 / Braden Hamlin-Uele; Reserves: RE / 18 / Billy Magoulias; RE / 19 / Blayke Brailey; RE / 20 / Kyle Flanagan; RE / 21 / Matt Moylan; Coach: / / John Morris

=== Finals series ===
Date
Week
Opponent
Venue
Result
Cro.
Opp.
Tries
Goals
Field Goals
Report
14 September
1
Manly Sea Eagles
Lottoland, Sydney
Loss
16
28
Xerri, Gray, Morris
Johnson 2/3

Team Details

FB	1	Josh Dugan
WG	2	Sosaia Feki
CE	3	Bronson Xerri
CE	4	Josh Morris
WG	5	Aaron Gray
FE	6	Shaun Johnson
HB	7	Chad Townsend
PR	16	Andrew Fifita
HK	9	Jayden Brailey
PR	10	Matt Prior
SR	11	Briton Nikora
SR	12	Wade Graham (c)
LK	13	Paul Gallen (c)
Interchange:
IC	8	Aaron Woods
IC	14	Kurt Capewell
IC	15	Jack Williams
IC	17	Braden Hamlin-Uele
Reserves:
RE	18	Billy Magoulias
RE	19	Blayke Brailey
RE	20	Kyle Flanagan
RE	21	Matt Moylan
Coach:		John Morris

=== Ladder ===
2019 NRL season
Pos	Team	Pld	W	D	L	B	PF	PA	PD	Pts
1	Melbourne Storm	24	20	0	4	1	631	300	+331	42
2	Sydney Roosters	24	17	0	7	1	627	363	+264	36
3	South Sydney Rabbitohs	24	16	0	8	1	521	417	+104	34
4	Canberra Raiders	24	15	0	9	1	524	374	+150	32
5	Parramatta Eels	24	14	0	10	1	533	473	+60	30
6	Manly-Warringah Sea Eagles	24	14	0	10	1	496	446	+50	30
7	Cronulla-Sutherland Sharks	24	12	0	12	1	514	464	+50	26
8	Brisbane Broncos	24	11	1	12	1	432	489	−57	25
9	Wests Tigers	24	11	0	13	1	475	486	−11	24
10	Penrith Panthers	24	11	0	13	1	413	474	−61	24
11	Newcastle Knights	24	10	0	14	1	485	522	−37	22
12	Canterbury-Bankstown Bulldogs	24	10	0	14	1	326	477	−151	22
13	New Zealand Warriors	24	9	1	14	1	433	574	−141	21
14	North Queensland Cowboys	24	9	0	15	1	378	500	−122	20
15	St. George Illawarra Dragons	24	8	0	16	1	427	575	−148	18
16	Gold Coast Titans	24	4	0	20	1	370	651	−281	10

== Squad ==
Cronulla Sharks 2019 Squad
First Grade (Top 30) Squad			Development Players	Coaching staff
Blayke Brailey – HK; Jayden Brailey – HK; Jayson Bukuya – SR, LK; Kurt Capewell – SR, CE; Josh Dugan – CE, FB, WG; Sosaia Feki – WG; Andrew Fifita (vc) – PR; Kyle Flanagan (gk) – HB, FE; Paul Gallen (c) – LK, PR; Wade Graham (c) – SR, FE	Aaron Gray – WG, CE; Braden Hamlin-Uele – PR; Shaun Johnson (gk) – HB, FE; Sione Katoa – WG; William Kennedy – FB; Billy Magoulias – LK, HK; Kayleb Milne – SR, LK; Josh Morris – CE, WG; Matt Moylan – FB, FE; Ronaldo Mulitalo – CE, WG	Briton Nikora – SR; Matt Prior – PR, LK; Scott Sorensen – SR; Cruz Topai-Aveai – PR; Chad Townsend (gk) – HB; Braydon Trindall – HB, FE; Jack Williams – LK; Teig Wilton – SR; Aaron Woods – PR; Bronson Xerri – CE	Josh Carr – SR; Jackson Ferris – CE, WG; Jaimin Jolliffe – PR, LK; Toby Rudolf – PR, SR; Daniel Vasquez – PR, LK	Head coach: John Morris; Assistant coach: Jim Dymock; Legend: (c) Captain(s); (vc) Vice-captain(s); Injured

== Player movements ==
Losses

- Bessie Aufaga-Toomaga to Central Queensland Capras
- Kurt Dillon to South Sydney Rabbitohs
- Valentine Holmes to New York Jets
- Edrick Lee to Newcastle Knights
- Ricky Leutele to Toronto Wolfpack
- Luke Lewis to retirement
- Isaac Lumelume to Melbourne Storm (mid-season)
- Joseph Paulo to St Helens R.F.C.
- Jesse Ramien to Newcastle Knights
- James Segeyaro to Brisbane Broncos (mid-season)
- Ava Seumanufagai to Leeds Rhinos (mid-season)

Gains

- Jackson Ferris from Cronulla-Sutherland Sharks Jersey Flegg Cup
- Shaun Johnson from New Zealand Warriors
- Jaimin Jolliffe from Newtown Jets (mid-season)
- Josh Morris from Canterbury-Bankstown Bulldogs
- Kayleb Milne from Melbourne Storm (mid-season)
- Ronaldo Mulitalo from Cronulla-Sutherland Sharks Jersey Flegg Cup
- Toby Rudolf from Redcliffe Dolphins
- Braydon Trindall from Cronulla-Sutherland Sharks Jersey Flegg Cup
- Teig Wilton from Cronulla-Sutherland Sharks Jersey Flegg Cup
- Bronson Xerri from Cronulla-Sutherland Sharks Jersey Flegg Cup

== Representative honours ==
The following players have played a first grade representative match in 2019. (C) = Captain

Player	2019 All Stars match	State of Origin 1	2019 Oceania Cup and Internationals	State of Origin 2	State of Origin 3	World Cup 9s	International Rugby League tests
Andrew Fifita	Indigenous All Stars	-	-^{1}	-	-	Tonga	Tonga
Josh Morris	-	New South Wales	-	-	-	-	-
Shaun Johnson	-	-	New Zealand	-	-	New Zealand	New Zealand
Briton Nikora	-	-	New Zealand	-	-	New Zealand	New Zealand
Isaac Lumelume	-	-	Fiji	-	-	-	-
Jayson Bukuya	-	-	Fiji	-	-	-	-
Wade Graham	-	-	-	New South Wales	New South Wales	Australia	Australia; Prime Minister's XIII
Braden Hamlin-Uele	-	-	-	-	-	New Zealand	New Zealand
Sione Katoa	-	-	-	-	-	Tonga	-
Ronaldo Mulitalo	-	-	-	-	-	United States	Samoa
Billy Magoulias	-	-	-	-	-	-	Greece

^{1} – Andrew Fifita was originally selected to play, but was subsequently forced to withdraw following suspension.

== Squad statistics ==
Statistics Source:

Name	App	T	G	FG	Pts
Blayke Brailey	15	2	0	0	8
Jayden Brailey	24	2	0	0	8
Jayson Bukuya	16	0	0	0	0
Kurt Capewell	25	1	0	0	4
Josh Dugan	23	11	0	0	44
Sosaia Feki	22	9	0	0	36
Andrew Fifita	21	2	0	0	8
Kyle Flanagan	8	1	19	0	42
Paul Gallen	22	1	2	1	9
Wade Graham	10	1	0	0	4
Aaron Gray	6	5	0	0	20
Braden Hamlin-Uele	21	4	0	0	16
Shaun Johnson	18	3	45	0	102
Sione Katoa	7	4	0	0	16
William Kennedy	2	0	0	0	0
Billy Magoulias	2	0	0	0	0
Josh Morris	23	15	0	0	60
Matt Moylan	11	0	0	0	0
Ronaldo Mulitalo	8	5	0	0	20
Briton Nikora	24	7	0	0	28
Matt Prior	25	0	0	0	0
Scott Sorensen	5	0	0	0	0
Chad Townsend	25	6	7	3	41
Jack Williams	24	2	0	0	8
Aaron Woods	16	1	0	0	4
Bronson Xerri	22	13	0	0	52
26 Players used	—	0	0	0	0
