= Anthony Xuereb =

Former Malta international rugby league footballer

Personal information
- Born: 28 June 1970 (age 56) Penrith, New South Wales, Australia

Playing information
- Position: Fullback, Wing, Centre
Club
Years	Team	Pld	T	G	FG	P
1991	Penrith Panthers	13	2	0	0	8
1992	Western Suburbs	2	0	0	0	0
1993–94	Penrith Panthers	19	5	1	0	22
	Total	34	7	1	0	30
Representative
Years	Team	Pld	T	G	FG	P
2005	Malta	1	0	0	0	0
- Source: As of 17 February 2021

Anthony Xuereb (born 28 June 1970) is a former Malta international rugby league footballer who played for the Penrith Panthers and Western Suburbs in the New South Wales Rugby League premiership.

To date, he is one of only two players in the history of the NRL (the other being Bronson Xerri) with a last name beginning with the letter "X"; both also happen to be eligible for Malta.

== Background ==
Xuereb was born in Penrith, New South Wales. He grew up living in the suburbs of Tregear and Mount Druitt. He attended Tregear Primary School and Dunheved High School.

== Playing career ==
Xuereb made his first grade debut for Penrith in round 10 1991 against St. George at Penrith Park.

Following their 1991 grand final victory, Xuereb traveled with the Penrith to England for the 1991 World Club Challenge which was lost to Wigan.

In 1992, Xuereb joined Western Suburbs but only played two games for the club before heading back to Penrith.

Xuereb's final game in the top grade came against Eastern Suburbs in round 18 1994 at the Sydney Football Stadium which Penrith lost 30–8. He was released by the Penrith club at the end of the 1994 season and subsequently never played first grade again.

== International ==
Eleven years after his final first grade game, Xuereb gained one international cap for Malta in the 24–22 win over Greece, playing at centre, at Fairfax Community Stadium in Sydney on Sunday, 8 October 2005.

== Career playing statistics ==
=== Point scoring summary ===
Games	Tries	Goals	F/G	Points
34	7	1	-	30
