= Jack Williams (rugby league) =

Australian rugby league footballer (born 1996)

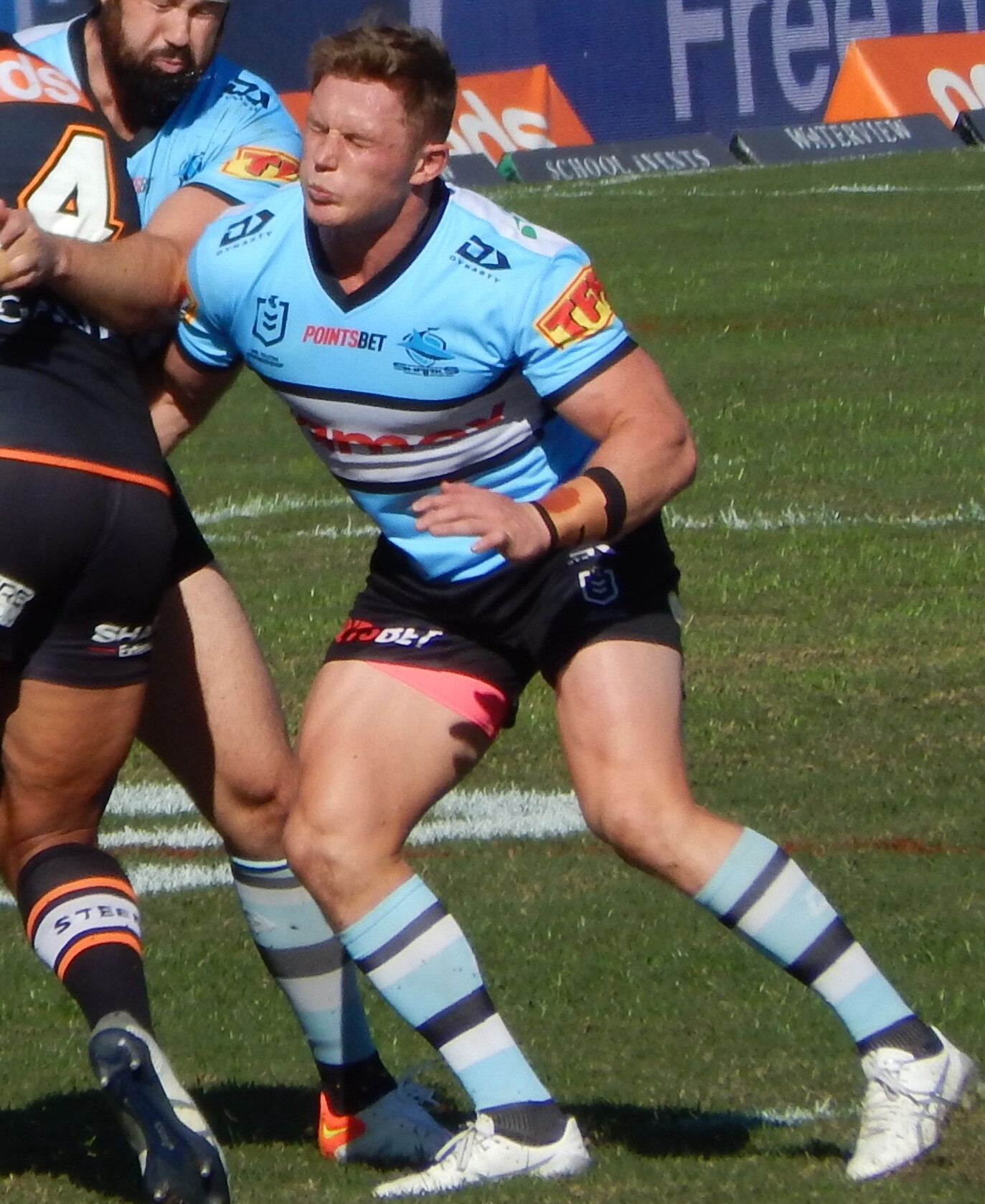

Personal information
- Born: 28 September 1996 (age 30) Pambula, New South Wales, Australia
- Height: 184 cm (6 ft 0 in)
- Weight: 98 kg (15 st 6 lb)

Playing information
- Position: Lock, Second-row, Prop
Club
Years	Team	Pld	T	G	FG	P
2018–24	Cronulla Sharks	124	11	0	0	44
2025–	Parramatta Eels	45	4	0	0	16
	Total	169	15	0	0	60
Representative
Years	Team	Pld	T	G	FG	P
2017	NSW Residents	1	0	0	0	0
2025	Prime Minister's XIII	1	0	0	0	0
- Source: As of 6 September 2026

Jack Williams (born 28 September 1996) is an Australian rugby league footballer who plays as a lock, second-row or prop forward for the Parramatta Eels in the National Rugby League.

== Background ==
Williams was born in Pambula, New South Wales, Australia.

He played his junior rugby league for the Cooma Colts.

== Career ==
=== 2018 ===
In round 10 of the 2018 NRL season, Williams made his NRL debut for Cronulla, scoring a try in their 24–16 win over the Canberra Raiders.

=== 2019 ===
Williams made a total of 24 appearances for Cronulla in the 2019 NRL season as the club finished 7th on the table and qualified for the finals. Williams played from the bench in the club's elimination final defeat against Manly at Brookvale Oval.

=== 2020 ===
Williams played 17 games for Cronulla in the 2020 NRL season as the club finished 8th and qualified for the finals. He played in Cronulla's elimination final loss against Canberra.

=== 2021 ===
Williams played every match for Cronulla in the 2021 NRL season which saw the club narrowly miss the finals by finishing 9th on the table.

=== 2022 ===
Williams was limited to only six appearances for Cronulla in the 2022 NRL season as the club finished second on the table and qualified for the finals. Williams did not feature in Cronulla's finals campaign which saw them eliminated in the second week by South Sydney.

=== 2023 ===
Williams played a total of 24 games for Cronulla in the 2023 NRL season as Cronulla finished sixth on the table. Williams played in the clubs 13–12 upset loss against the Sydney Roosters which ended their season.

=== 2024 ===
Williams played 25 games for Cronulla in the 2024 NRL season as the club finished 4th on the table and qualified for the finals. Williams played in all three of the clubs finals matches including their preliminary final loss to Penrith. On 1 October it was announced that Williams had signed a three-year deal to join the Parramatta Eels until 2027.

=== 2025 ===
On 30 January, Williams was named in Parramatta's new leadership group after the club announced Mitchell Moses as their new club captain. Williams made his club debut for Parramatta in round 1 of the 2025 NRL season against Melbourne which saw the side lose 56–18. On 29 March, it was announced that Williams would be ruled out for at least six weeks with a knee injury. Williams played 21 games for Parramatta in the 2025 NRL season as the club finished 11th on the table. Williams was later awarded with the Ken Thornett Medal after being named Parramatta's player of the season. On 6 October, Williams was named in the PM's XIII to face Papua New Guinea.

=== 2026 ===
Williams played every game for Parramatta in the 2026 NRL season as the club finished 13th on the table. In September, Williams was voted as Parramatta's player of the season along with Brian Kelly.

== Statistics ==
=== NRL ===
*denotes season competing

Season	Team	Matches	T	G	GK %	F/G	Pts
2018	Cronulla-Sutherland	4	1	0	—	0	4
2019	Cronulla-Sutherland	24	2	0	—	0	8
2020	Cronulla-Sutherland	17	2	0	—	0	8
2021	Cronulla-Sutherland	24	2	0	—	0	8
2022	Cronulla-Sutherland	6	0	0	—	0	0
2023	Cronulla-Sutherland	24	2	0		0	8
2024	Cronulla-Sutherland	25	2				8
2025	Parramatta Eels	21	2	0	0	0	8
2026	Parramatta Eels	24	2	0	0	0	8
Career totals		150	13	0	—	0	52
