= Braden Hamlin-Uele =

NZ & Samoa international rugby league footballer

Braden Uele
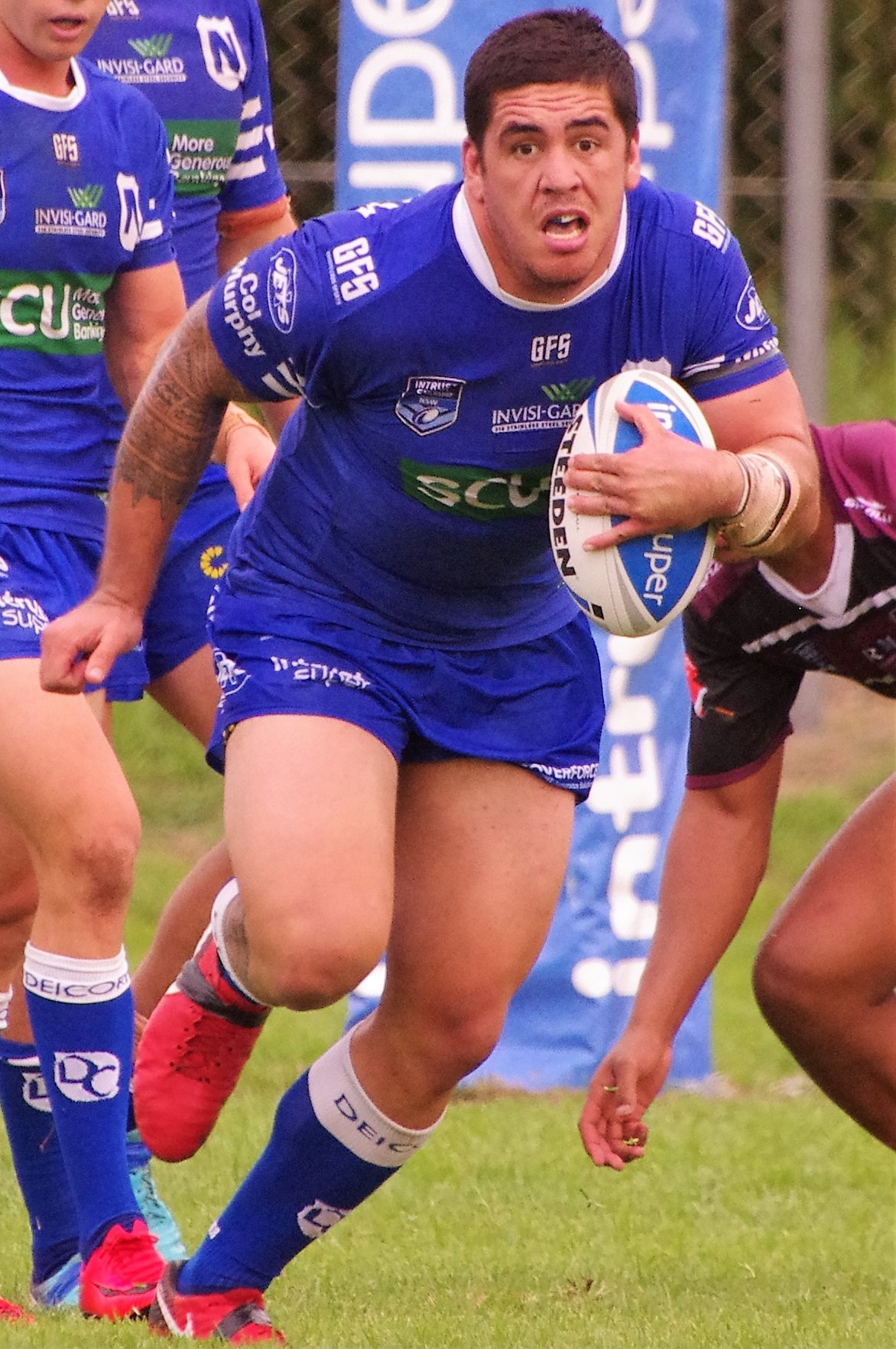

Personal information
- Full name: Braden Uele
- Born: Braden Uele; 9 January 1995 (age 31) Auckland, New Zealand
- Height: 191 cm (6 ft 3 in)
- Weight: 115 kg (18 st 2 lb)

Playing information
- Position: Prop
Club
Years	Team	Pld	T	G	FG	P
2017	North Qld Cowboys	1	0	0	0	0
2018–26	Cronulla Sharks	135	17	0	0	68
2027	Sydney Roosters
	Total	136	17	0	0	68
Representative
Years	Team	Pld	T	G	FG	P
2019	New Zealand	1	0	0	0	0
2022–	Samoa	1	0	0	0	0
- Source: As of 20 November 2026
- Relatives: Caleb Hamlin-Uele (brother)

Braden Uele (born 9 January 1995), also known as Braden Hamlin-Uele, is a professional rugby league footballer who plays as a prop for the Sydney Roosters in the NRL. He has played for both Samoa and New Zealand at international level.

He previously played for the North Queensland Cowboys in the National Rugby League.

== Background ==
Uele was born in Auckland, New Zealand, and is of English and Samoan descent.

He moved to New Zealand before he turned one. Uele played his junior rugby league for the Glenora Bears and Point Chevalier Pirates before signing with the Sydney Roosters.

== Playing career ==
=== Early career ===
In 2013, Uele started the season playing for the Roosters' SG Ball Cup side before he made his NYC debut later that year. In 2014, he represented the Junior Kiwis.

In 2015, Uele joined the North Queensland Cowboys, playing for their NYC side and once again representing the Junior Kiwis. After graduating from the NYC, Uele signed a two-year NRL contract with the Cowboys. This re-united Uele with Paul Green, who gave him his NYC debut while he coached the Roosters. In 2016, Uele spent the entire season playing for the Mackay Cutters, one of the Cowboys' Queensland Cup feeder clubs.

=== 2017 ===
In Round 21 of the 2017 NRL season, Uele made his NRL debut against the Sydney Roosters.

In August, Uele signed a two-year contract with the Cronulla-Sutherland Sharks.

=== 2018 ===
Uele made his debut appearance for Cronulla in Round 10 against Canberra which ended in a 24–16 victory. Uele spent the majority of the season playing for Cronulla's feeder club team Newtown in the Intrust Super Premiership NSW. Uele played from the bench in Newtown's grand final defeat against Canterbury.

=== 2019 ===
On 14 June, Uele signed a contract extension with Cronulla keeping him at the club until the end of the 2022 season.

Uele made a total of 21 appearances for Cronulla in the 2019 NRL season as the club finished in 7th spot on the table. Uele played in the Cronulla's elimination final defeat against Manly at Brookvale Oval.

=== 2020 ===
He played 21 games for Cronulla in the 2020 NRL season as the club finished 8th and qualified for the finals. He played in Cronulla's elimination final loss against Canberra.

=== 2021 ===
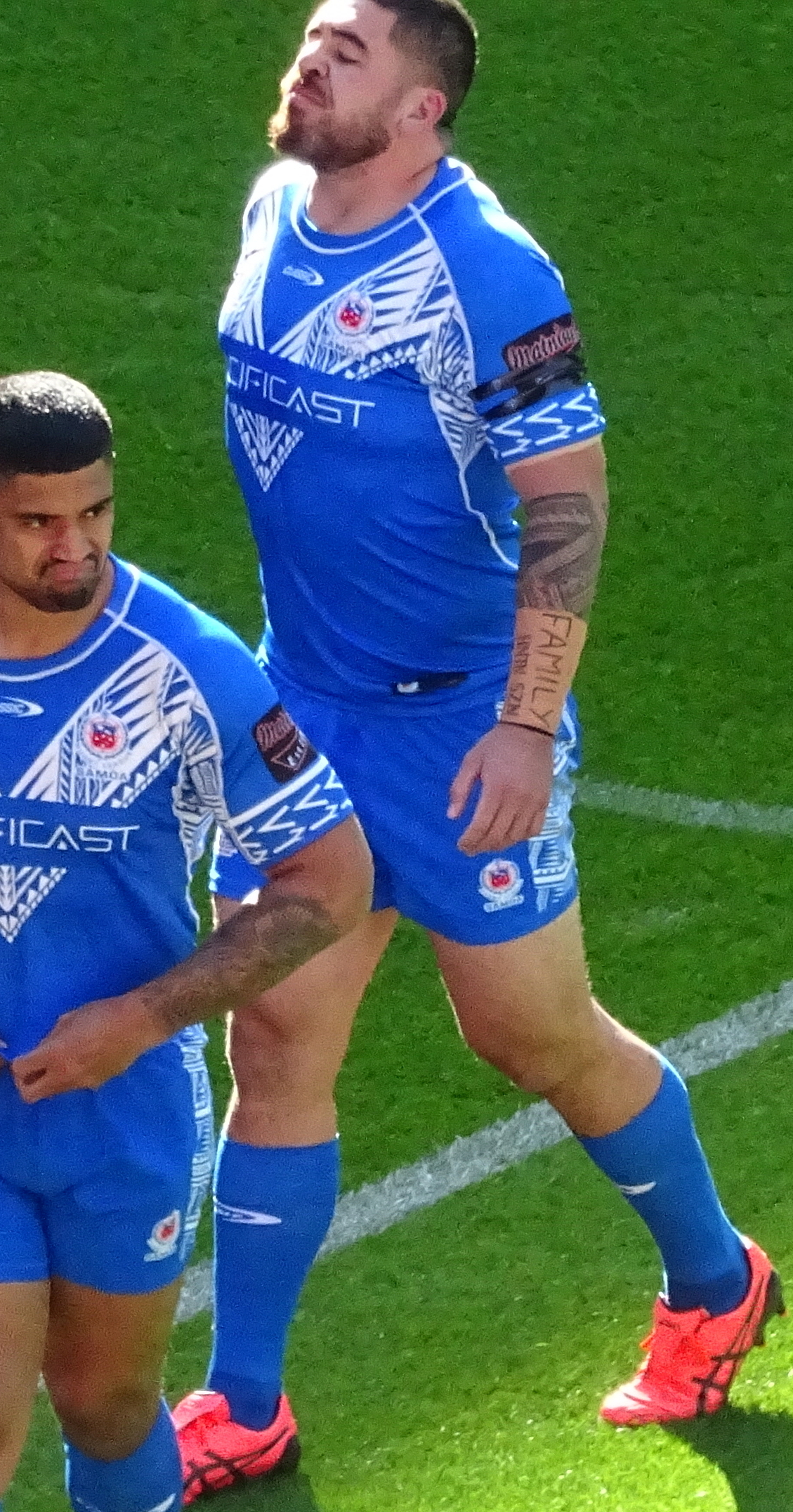
Hamlin-Uele warming up for Samoa in 2022

He played 19 games for Cronulla in the 2021 NRL season which saw the club narrowly miss the finals by finishing 9th on the table.

=== 2022 ===
Hamlin-Uele played 17 games for Cronulla in the 2022 NRL season as the club finished second on the table and qualified for the finals. He played in both finals games which saw Cronulla eliminated in straight sets.

In October Hamlin-Uele was named in the Samoa squad for the 2021 Rugby League World Cup.

=== 2023 ===
Hamlin-Uele played a total of 19 games for Cronulla in the 2023 NRL season as Cronulla finished sixth on the table. Hamlin-Uele missed the clubs elimination final loss against the Sydney Roosters due to injury.

=== 2024 ===
Hamlin-Uele was limited to only twelve appearances with Cronulla in the 2024 NRL season as they finished 4th on the table and qualified for the finals. He did not feature in Cronulla's finals campaign which ended at the preliminary final stage against Penrith. On 29 September, he played for Newtown in their 2024 NSW Cup Grand Final victory over North Sydney.

=== 2025 ===
He played 21 matches for Cronulla in the 2025 NRL season as the club finished 5th on the table. The club reached the preliminary final for a second consecutive season but lost against Melbourne 22–14.

=== 2026 ===
Hamlin-Uele was limited to just four appearances with Cronulla in the 2026 NRL season as the club finished 5th on the table and qualified for the finals. In September, he played for the clubs feeder side Newtown in their 2026 NSW Cup Grand Final loss to Penrith. On 30 October 2026, the Sharks confirmed that Uele was one of nine players leaving the club at the end of the season. On the 18th of November 2026, it was announced that Uele would join the Sydney Roosters for the 2027 season.

== Statistics ==
=== NRL ===
Season	Team	Matches	T	G	GK %	F/G	Pts
2017	North Queensland	1	0	0	—	0	0
2018	Cronulla-Sutherland	1	0	0	—	0	0
2019	Cronulla-Sutherland	21	4	0	—	0	16
2020	Cronulla-Sutherland	21	6	0	—	0	24
2021	Cronulla-Sutherland	19	1	0	—	0	4
2022	Cronulla-Sutherland	17	2	0	—	0	8
2023	Cronulla-Sutherland	19	1				4
2024	Cronulla-Sutherland	12	1				4
2025	Cronulla-Sutherland	21	2				8
2026	Cronulla-Sutherland	3					
Career totals		135	17	0	—	0	68

=== International ===
Season	Team	Matches	T	G	GK %	F/G	Pts
2019	New Zealand	1	0	0	—	0	0
2022	Samoa	1	0	0	—	0	0
Career totals		2	0	0	—	0	0
