= Bronson Xerri =

Australian rugby league footballer

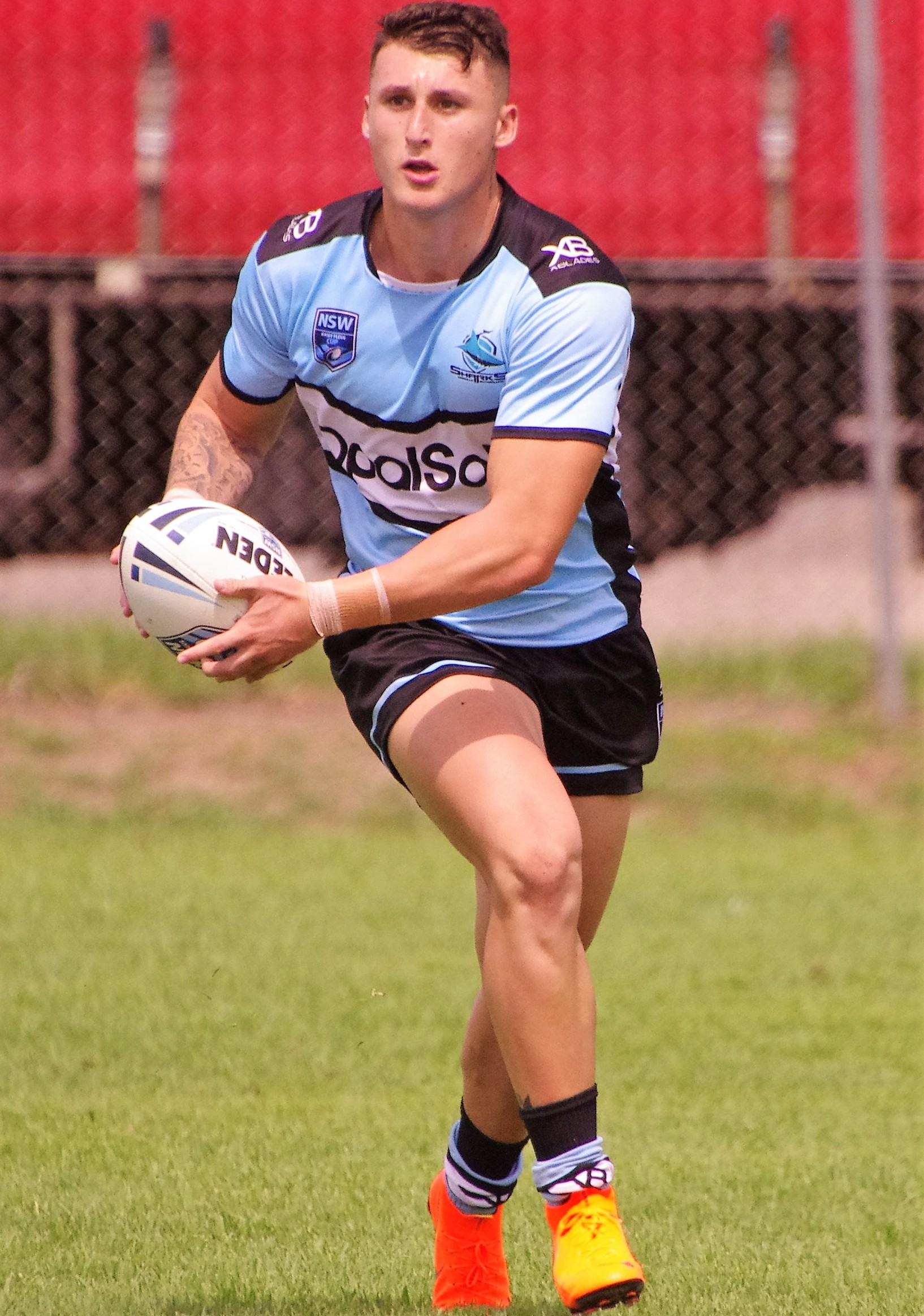

Personal information
- Full name: Bronson Xerri
- Born: 10 September 2000 (age 26) Sydney, New South Wales, Australia
- Height: 187 cm (6 ft 2 in)
- Weight: 99 kg (15 st 8 lb)

Playing information
- Position: Centre
Club
Years	Team	Pld	T	G	FG	P
2019	Cronulla Sharks	22	13	0	0	52
2024–26	Canterbury Bulldogs	59	22	0	0	84
2027–	Melbourne Storm	0	0	0	0	0
	Total	81	35	0	0	136
- Source: As of 3 September 2026

Bronson Xerri (/ʃɛri/, "sherry") (born 10 September 2000) is an Australian professional rugby league footballer who plays as a centre for the Melbourne Storm in the National Rugby League. He previously played for the Cronulla-Sutherland Sharks, before being suspended for four years, before returning to play for the Canterbury-Bankstown Bulldogs. To date, Xerri is one of only two players in the history of the NRL (the other being Anthony Xuereb) with a last name beginning with the letter "X"; both also happen to be eligible for Malta.

== Background ==
Xerri was born in Sydney, New South Wales, Australia, and is of Maltese and Italian descent.

He played his junior rugby league for the Aquinas Colts and Moorebank Rams. Before making his first grade debut, Xerri played for Cronulla's under 20's side along with representing New South Wales Under 18 and Under 20's sides.

== Career ==
=== 2019 ===
Xerri made his debut in round 4 of the 2019 NRL season against the Parramatta Eels. Xerri went on from there and kept playing in the centres for the next two rounds of the season where he scored his first NRL career try against the Penrith Panthers in round six.

In round 10 against rivals the St. George Illawarra Dragons, Xerri scored his first career hat-trick as Cronulla won the match 22–9 at Kogarah Oval. The following week, Xerri scored two tries as Cronulla defeated Parramatta 42–22.

In round 20, Xerri scored 2 tries as Cronulla defeated the South Sydney Rabbitohs 39–24 at Shark Park.

In round 22 against St. George Illawarra, Xerri scored the winning try as Cronulla won the match 18–12 at Shark Park.

At the end of the 2019 regular season, Cronulla finished in 7th place on the table. Xerri played in the club's elimination final match which Cronulla lost 28–16 against Manly at Brookvale Oval with Xerri scoring a try in the loss.

=== 2020 ===
On 26 May 2020, Xerri was provisionally suspended after failing a drug test.

On 1 September, Xerri's B-Sample returned and confirmed he had tested positive for the use of anabolic steroids. The NRL released a statement saying “The National Rugby League (NRL) has today issued Cronulla Sharks player Bronson Xerri with a Notice of Alleged Anti-Doping Rule Violations under the NRL’s Anti-Doping Policy,” the NRL said in a statement.

“This follows the return of a positive sample and completion of the anti-doping process administered by Sport Integrity Australia.

“The Notice alleges that Mr Xerri breached the policy through the presence, use and possession of Anabolic Androgenic Steroids prohibited by the World Anti-Doping Agency (WADA) and the NRL's Anti-Doping Policy".

=== 2021 ===
On 23 March, the NRL confirmed that Xerri had been formally suspended for four years following a ruling made by the NRL Anti-Doping Tribunal. Xerri would be free to resume his career from November 2023.

In response to his appeal being rejected and the ban upheld, Xerri said “For all you haters calling me a drug cheat, you all have no clue how much I put in the work to be where I was, and to my loyal family and friends, words can't express how much you all mean to me. The comeback is on, 2024".

=== 2022 ===
On 2 December, it was announced that Canterbury had offered Xerri a two-year deal starting in 2024 after his doping ban is completed.

=== 2024 ===
On 15 February, Xerri played his first rugby league game in four years which came in a trial match for Canterbury against Melbourne at Belmore Sports Ground. In round 5 of the 2024 NRL season, Xerri made his debut for Canterbury in the NRL in their 30-26 victory over the Sydney Roosters. Xerri played a total of 19 games for Canterbury in the 2024 NRL season as the club qualified for the finals finishing 6th. Xerri played in Canterbury's elimination final loss against Manly. On 28 November, Canterbury announced that Xerri had extended his contract until the end of 2027.

=== 2025 ===
In round 4 of the 2025 NRL season, Xerri scored two tries against his former club Cronulla in Canterbury's 20-6 victory. Xerri played 24 games for Canterbury in the 2025 NRL season as the club finished third and qualified for the finals. Canterbury would be eliminated from the finals in straight sets.

=== 2026 ===
On 10 July, Melbourne announced that Xerri had signed a three-year deal with the club starting in 2027. This came after Xerri was given permission to negotiate with other clubs by Canterbury despite having a year remaining on his contract. Xerri had been demoted to reserve grade just one game into the 2026 season and it was reported that he had grown out of favour with Canterbury officials.

== Statistics ==
Year	Team	Games	Tries	Pts
2019	Cronulla-Sutherland Sharks	22	13	52
2024	Canterbury-Bankstown Bulldogs	19	10	40
2025	Canterbury-Bankstown Bulldogs	24	9	36
2026	Canterbury-Bankstown Bulldogs	11	2	8
	Totals	76	34	136
