= Blayke Brailey =

Australia international rugby league footballer

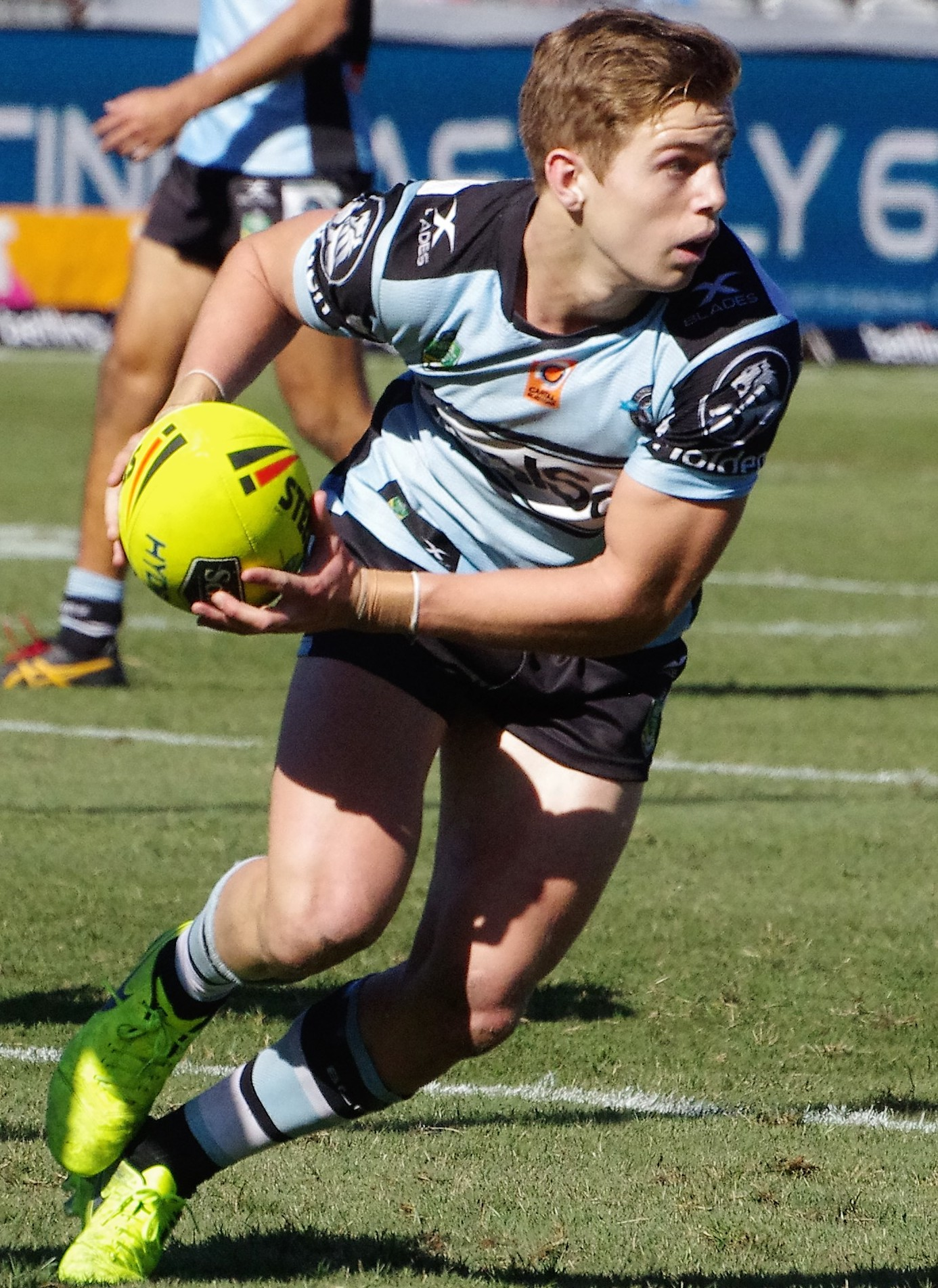

Personal information
- Born: 23 September 1998 (age 28) Sydney, New South Wales, Australia
- Height: 180 cm (5 ft 11 in)
- Weight: 80 kg (12 st 8 lb)

Playing information
- Position: Hooker
Club
Years	Team	Pld	T	G	FG	P
2019–	Cronulla Sharks	185	21	0	0	84
Representative
Years	Team	Pld	T	G	FG	P
2018	NSW Residents	1	0	0	0	0
2026	New South Wales	2	0	0	0	0
2026–	Australia	1	0	0	0	0
- Source: As of 16 November 2026
- Relatives: Jayden Brailey (brother)

Blayke Brailey (born 23 September 1998) is an Australian rugby league footballer who plays as a hooker for and co-captains the Cronulla-Sutherland Sharks in the NRL and Australia at international level.

He is known for his tackling abilities and defensive attributes.

== Background ==
Brailey was born in Sydney, New South Wales, Australia.

He played his junior rugby league for the Aquinas Colts. His older brother Jayden is also a hooker who plays for the Canberra Raiders in the National Rugby League.

== Playing career ==
=== 2018 ===
Brailey played for Cronulla's feeder club side Newtown Jets in the 2018 Intrust Super Premiership NSW grand final against Canterbury-Bankstown at Leichhardt Oval which Newtown lost 18–12.

=== 2019 ===
Brailey made his first grade debut in round 1 of the 2019 NRL season against the Newcastle Knights.

Brailey played for Cronulla's feeder side Newtown in their Canterbury Cup NSW grand final victory over the Wentworthville Magpies at Bankwest Stadium. Newtown won the match 20–15 after extra-time. The following week, Brailey played in the NRL State Championship final for Newtown against the Burleigh Bears at ANZ Stadium which Newtown won on the final siren after trailing Burleigh 16–14 to win 20–16.

=== 2020 ===
After the departure of his brother Jayden to Newcastle, Brailey became the Sharks’ first-choice hooker for the 2020 NRL season. Brailey played in 20 games throughout the shortened season, including Cronulla's elimination final exit.

=== 2021 ===
Brailey played a total of 24 games for Cronulla in the 2021 NRL season which saw the club finish 9th and narrowly miss out on the finals.

=== 2022 ===
Brailey played 26 games for Cronulla in the 2022 NRL season including both of the clubs finals games as they were eliminated in straight sets losing to North Queensland and South Sydney.

=== 2023 ===
Brailey was added to the extended squad for the NSW Blues for Game 1 in Adelaide. In round 18 of the 2023 NRL season, Brailey made his 100th first grade appearance for Cronulla in their 52–16 victory over rivals St. George Illawarra. Brailey was named 2023 Porter Gallen Medal winner as 2023 Cronulla Sharks player of the year and also Tommy Bishop Player's Player.

=== 2024 ===
Brailey played 27 games for Cronulla in the 2024 NRL season as the club finished 4th on the table and qualified for the finals. Brailey played in the clubs preliminary final loss against Penrith.

=== 2025 ===
On 5 September, Cronulla announced that Brailey had re-signed with the club until the end of 2030. Brailey played 27 matches for Cronulla in the 2025 NRL season as the club finished 5th on the table. The club reached the preliminary final for a second consecutive season but lost against Melbourne 22–14.

=== 2026 ===
He made his New South Wales debut in Game 1 of the 2026 State of Origin on 27 May 2026 in the 22-20 win. Brailey played 21 games for Cronulla in the 2026 NRL season as the club finished 5th on the table and qualified for the finals.

He made his Australia international début in the 2026 Rugby League World Cup 36-22 win over Fiji on 25 October 2026.

== Statistics ==
=== NRL ===
*denotes season competing

Season	Team	Matches	T	Pts
2019	Cronulla-Sutherland	15	2	8
2020	Cronulla-Sutherland	20	4	16
2021	Cronulla-Sutherland	24	2	8
2022	Cronulla-Sutherland	26	3	12
2023	Cronulla-Sutherland	25	1	4
2024	Cronulla-Sutherland	27	3	12
2025	Cronulla-Sutherland	27	3	12
2026	Cronulla-Sutherland	21	3	12
2027	Cronulla-Sutherland			
Career totals		185	21	84

== Honours ==
Representative

- Rugby League World Cup Champion: 2026
