= Aaron Gray (rugby league) =

Australian rugby league footballer

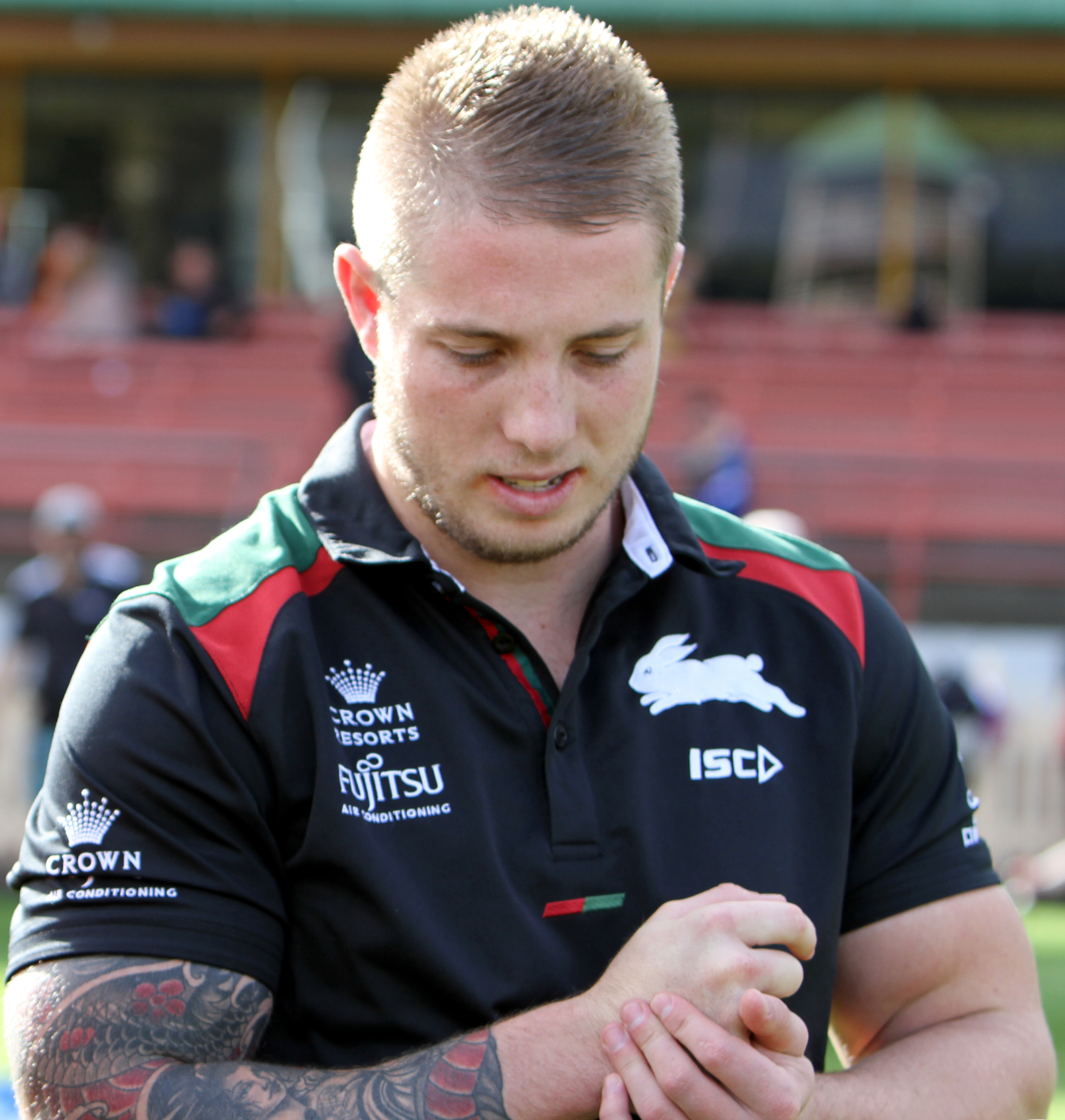

Personal information
- Born: 7 April 1994 (age 32) Sydney, New South Wales, Australia
- Height: 181 cm (5 ft 11 in)
- Weight: 96 kg (15 st 2 lb)

Playing information
- Position: Wing, Centre
Club
Years	Team	Pld	T	G	FG	P
2015–17	South Sydney	42	17	0	0	68
2018–19	Cronulla Sharks	7	5	0	0	20
	Total	49	22	0	0	88
Representative
Years	Team	Pld	T	G	FG	P
2016	NSW City	1	4	0	0	16
2018	NSW Residents	1	0	0	0	0
- Source: As of 10 January 2024
- Relatives: Brock Gray (brother); Tiana Penitani (Wife)

Aaron Gray (born 7 April 1994) is an Australian professional rugby league footballer who last played as a centre and on the wing for the Cronulla-Sutherland Sharks in the NRL.

He previously played for the South Sydney Rabbitohs in the National Rugby League. Gray played for NSW City in 2016.

== Background ==
Gray was born in Sydney, New South Wales, Australia.

He played his junior rugby league for the Mascot Jets, before being signed by the South Sydney Rabbitohs.

== Playing career ==
=== Early career ===
From 2012 to 2014, Gray played for the South Sydney Rabbitohs' NYC team. On 3 May 2014, he played for the New South Wales under-20s team against the Queensland under-20s team, after coming in as a late inclusion for an injured player.

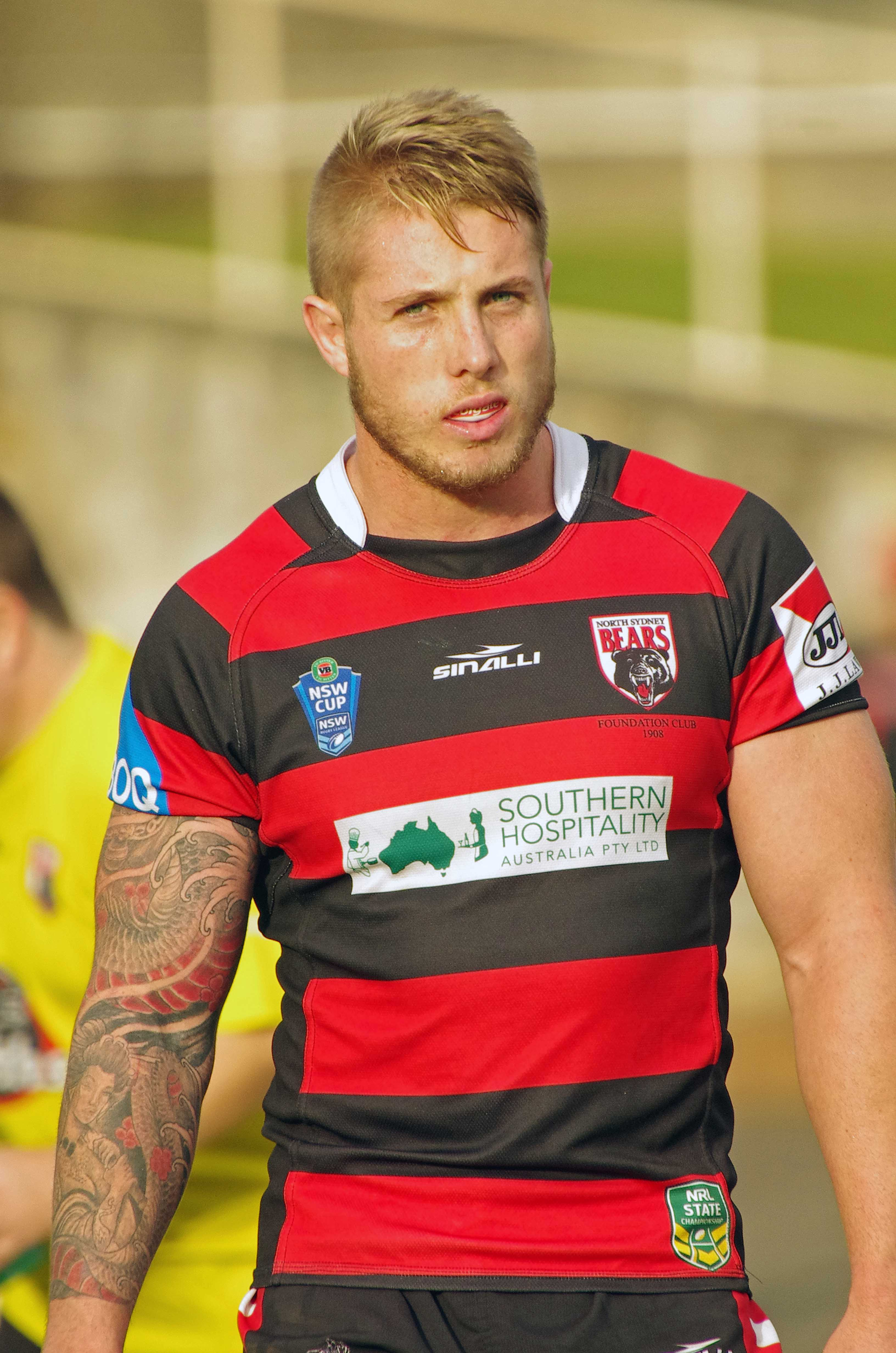
Gray playing for the North Sydney Bears

=== 2015 ===
On 31 January and 1 February, Gray played for South Sydney in the 2015 NRL Auckland Nines.

In 2015, Gray graduated on to South Sydney's New South Wales Cup team, the North Sydney Bears. Gray played 12 games for Norths and scored 7 tries before making his NRL Debut. In Round 8 of the 2015 NRL season, he made his NRL debut for Souths against the Canberra Raiders, playing in the Rabbitohs' 22–30 loss. In Round 9, he scored his first two tries for the Rabbitohs against the St. George Illawarra Dragons. On 3 August, he re-signed with the Rabbitohs on a 2-year contract. He finished off the 2015 season having played in 12 games and scoring seven tries.

In the early hours of 22 September 2015, Gray and fellow South Sydney teammate and best friend Dylan Walker were hospitalized after the pair overdosed on prescription drugs Oxycodone and Tramadol at Gray's apartment in Rosebery. The pair were discovered by another friend who alerted emergency services and the pair were sent to St Vincent's Hospital in a critical condition placed in induced comas.

The pair were released from hospital three days later to front the media about the unfortunate situation.

=== 2016 ===
South Sydney's loss of centre Dylan Walker to the Manly Warringah Sea Eagles caused a reshuffle among the club's back-line, handing Gray a more secure spot on the wing. He began the season, scoring a try in round 1. In round 2, he scored his first career hat-trick against the Newcastle Knights in South Sydney's 48–6 win at ANZ Stadium. On 8 May, he played for NSW City against NSW Country in the annual City vs Country Origin match. Despite being named in the centres, an injury to City winger David Nofoaluma moved Gray to the wing, where he scored four tries in the match. During the second half of the season, the Rabbitohs shifted Gray to the position of centre, where he scored four tries overall, including a double in Round 26 against the Canterbury-Bankstown Bulldogs. He finished the 2016 season with 21 appearances and 9 tries.

=== 2017 ===
Gray was named in the Souths squad for the 2017 NRL Auckland Nines.

On 13 July Gray signed a two-year contract with the Cronulla-Sutherland Sharks starting in 2018.

=== 2018 ===
Gray made his debut for Cronulla in round 2 against the St George Illawarra Dragons. In June 2018, Gray was selected to play for NSW residents against the QLD residents side. NSW residents won the match 36–20. Gray only managed to make 1 appearance for Cronulla in 2018 and spent the entire season playing for Newtown in the Intrust Super Premiership NSW. On 23 September, Gray played for Newtown in their 18–12 grand final loss to Canterbury.

=== 2019 ===
Gray started the 2019 NRL season in the Canterbury Cup NSW behind established winger Sosaia Feki and Sione Katoa. Gray was then called up to the Cronulla side to cover injuries within the team for the club's Round 8 match against Melbourne which Cronulla won 20–18. The following week, Gray scored 2 tries as Cronulla defeated the Gold Coast 26–18.

Gray played for Cronulla-Sutherland in their elimination final match against Manly-Warringah which ended in a 28–16 loss at Brookvale Oval with Gray scoring a try in the defeat.

Gray played for Cronulla's feeder side Newtown in their Canterbury Cup NSW grand final victory over the Wentworthville Magpies at Bankwest Stadium.

=== 2020 ===
In February, it was revealed that Gray was released by Cronulla-Sutherland after failing to secure a new contract.
