= Matt Prior (rugby league) =

Australian professional rugby league footballer

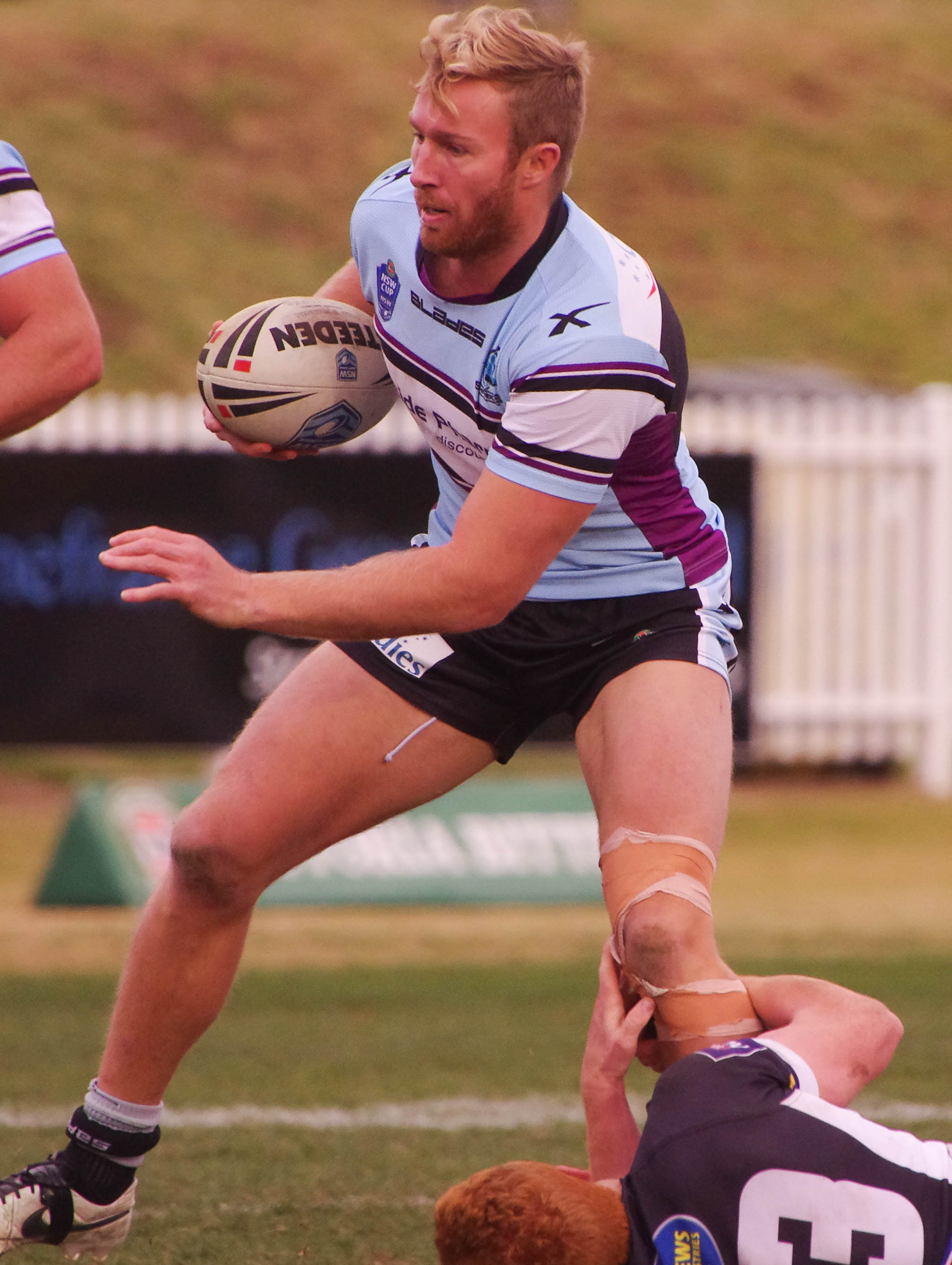

Personal information
- Full name: Matthew John Prior
- Born: 27 May 1987 (age 39) Wollongong, New South Wales, Australia
- Height: 6 ft 3 in (191 cm)
- Weight: 16 st 1 lb (102 kg)

Playing information
- Position: Prop, Loose forward, Second-row, Centre
Club
Years	Team	Pld	T	G	FG	P
2008–13	St. George Illawarra	123	8	0	0	32
2014–19	Cronulla Sharks	134	6	0	0	24
2020–22	Leeds Rhinos	62	7	0	0	28
	Total	319	21	0	0	84
Representative
Years	Team	Pld	T	G	FG	P
2011–17	Country Origin	2	0	0	0	0
2018	New South Wales	1	0	0	0	0
2021–22	Combined Nations All Stars	2	0	0	0	0
- Source: As of 26 September 2022

Matthew Prior (born 27 May 1987) is an Australian former professional rugby league footballer who played as prop and loose forward for the Leeds Rhinos in the Super League.

He was a member of the St. George Illawarra Dragons' 2010 and the Cronulla-Sutherland Sharks' 2016 NRL Premiership winning teams. Prior has played for Country Origin and New South Wales. He played as a second-row forward and centre earlier in his career.

== Background ==
Prior was born in Wollongong, New South Wales, Australia.

== Playing career ==
=== St George llawarra ===
Prior started at St. George Illawarra in 2006, making his first grade debut in round 5 of the 2008 NRL season. In 2010, he was a member of St. George Illawarra's premiership winning side and he played in their 2010 NRL Grand Final victory. That year he signed for a further three years with the club and he played with them till the end of 2013.

In round 9, 2012 he was sent off for striking North Queensland captain Johnathan Thurston with his elbow, with his charge referred directly to the NRL Judiciary. He was suspended for five weeks over the incident. After the incident Prior was moved to the interchange bench for the St. George Illawarra Dragons.

=== Cronulla ===
For the 2014 NRL season, Prior moved to the Cronulla-Sutherland Sharks. He was a regular member of their first grade team and in 2016 played a pivotal role in their push as premiership contenders. He gave a man of the match performance in their qualifying semi-final match against the Canberra Raiders and played in their semi-final victory over the North Queensland Cowboys to earn a place in the 2016 NRL Grand Final. Prior played at prop in the grand final against Melbourne which Cronulla won 14–12, claiming their first premiership since entering the competition in 1967.

On 3 September 2017, Prior made his 200th appearance in The NRL.

Prior played 27 games for Cronulla in 2018 as the club reached the preliminary final against Melbourne but fell short of another grand final appearance losing 22–6 at AAMI Park.

In round 23 2019, Prior played his 250th NRL game for the Sharks in their 42–16 win over the New Zealand Warriors at PointsBet Stadium in Cronulla. Prior made a total of 25 appearances for Cronulla in the 2019 NRL season as the club finished 7th on the table and qualified for the finals. Prior played in the club's elimination final loss against Manly-Warringah at Brookvale Oval.

=== Leeds Rhinos ===
On 29 November 2019, Prior signed a two-year contract to join English Super League team Leeds. On 17 October 2020, he played in the 2020 Challenge Cup Final victory for Leeds over Salford at Wembley Stadium. Prior played a total of 23 games for Leeds in the 2021 Super League season including the club's 36–8 loss against St Helens in the semi-final. In round 21 of the 2022 Super League season, Prior was sent off in Leeds 36–32 comeback victory over the Catalans Dragons. On 24 September 2022, Prior played for Leeds in their 24–12 loss to St Helens RFC in the 2022 Super League Grand Final.

=== Representative ===
On 13 January 2011, Prior was named in the "Blues in waiting" squad. He attended a three-day camp at Homebush January 2013 co-ordinated by coach Ricky Stuart for players deemed to have potential to feature in future New South Wales Origin teams.

A surprise selection, Prior was named in the 2018 NSW Blues team for Origin 2 to replace the injured Reagan Campbell-Gillard. New South Wales went on to win the game 18-14 and win their first series since 2014. In game 3, Prior was left out of The Blues side and was replaced by Tariq Sims.

On 25 June 2021 he played for the Combined Nations All Stars in their 26–24 victory over England, staged at the Halliwell Jones Stadium, Warrington, as part of England's 2021 Rugby League World Cup preparation.

== Statistics ==
Year	Team	Games	Tries	Pts
2008	St. George Illawarra Dragons	11		
2009	St. George Illawarra Dragons	20	2	8
2010	St. George Illawarra Dragons	23		
2011	St. George Illawarra Dragons	26	2	8
2012	St. George Illawarra Dragons	17	3	12
2013	St. George Illawarra Dragons	23	1	4
2014	Cronulla-Sutherland Sharks	10		
2015	Cronulla-Sutherland Sharks	22		
2016	Cronulla-Sutherland Sharks	25	4	16
2017	Cronulla-Sutherland Sharks	24	1	4
2018	Cronulla-Sutherland Sharks	27	1	4
2019	Cronulla-Sutherland Sharks	25		
2020	Leeds Rhinos	16		
2021	Leeds Rhinos	24	3	12
2022	Leeds Rhinos	23	4	16
	Totals	319	21	84
