= Jayson Bukuya =

Fiji international rugby league footballer

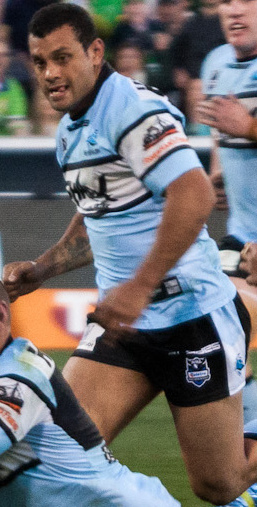

Personal information
- Full name: Jayson Bukuya
- Born: 21 April 1989 (age 37) Brisbane, Queensland, Australia

Playing information
- Height: 180 cm (5 ft 11 in)
- Weight: 95 kg (14 st 13 lb)
- Position: Second-row, Lock
Club
Years	Team	Pld	T	G	FG	P
2008–13	Cronulla Sharks	59	13	0	0	52
2014	New Zealand Warriors	18	2	0	0	8
2015–19	Cronulla Sharks	110	11	0	0	44
	Total	187	26	0	0	104
Representative
Years	Team	Pld	T	G	FG	P
2008–19	Fiji	20	7	0	0	28

Jayson Bukuya (born 21 April 1989) is a former Fiji international rugby league footballer who played as a lock or second-row forward for the Cronulla-Sutherland Sharks in the NRL.

Bukuya previously played for Cronulla and the New Zealand Warriors in the National Rugby League. He has part of the Sharks team that won their maiden premiership title in the 2016 season. Bukuya also played a prominent role for Newtown Jets during their 2019 campaign, where they lifted the highly coveted Canterbury Cup.

== Background ==
Bukuya was born in Brisbane, Queensland, Australia. Bukuya is of Fijian descent.

He attended Sandgate District State High School and St Patrick's College, Shorncliffe. He was also an Aspley and Norths Brisbane junior.

== Playing career ==
=== 2008-13 ===
Bukuya made his National Rugby League debut for the Cronulla Sharks in 2008. Bukuya played all 4 games for Fiji at the 2008 World Cup, and was again named in the Fiji squad for the 2013 Rugby League World Cup. During his first stint with the Sharks, Bukuya played in 59 NRL games, and scored 13 tries.

=== 2014 ===
He joined the New Zealand Warriors for the 2014 season. He finished off the year playing 18 NRL games and scoring 2 tries. On 1 November 2014, Bukuya was released from his Warriors' contract on compassionate grounds to return to Sydney.

=== 2015-2019 ===
On 11 November 2014, Bukuya signed a two-year deal to rejoin the Cronulla-Sutherland Sharks. In 2016, he was a part of the Sharks maiden premiership winning grand final team. In 2017, Bukuya was part of the Cronulla side which qualified for the finals but were eliminated in week one after suffering a shock defeat by North Queensland Cowboys 15–14. In 2018, Bukuya made 21 appearances for Cronulla as the club reached the preliminary final before being defeated by Melbourne Storm 22–6.

Bukuya made a total of 16 appearances for Cronulla in the 2019 NRL season. Bukuya played for Cronulla's feeder club Newtown in their 2019 Canterbury Cup NSW grand final victory over Wentworthville at the Western Sydney Stadium. The following week, Bukuya played for Newtown in the NRL State Championship victory over the Burleigh Bears at ANZ Stadium.

== Post playing ==
On 13 June 2020, Bukuya announced his retirement from rugby league effective immediately.

On 18 July 2020, Bukuya played for Dubbo CYMS against North Sydney in the first round of a state-wide open competition.

== Statistics ==
Year	Team	Games	Tries	Pts
2008	Cronulla-Sutherland Sharks	2		
2011	Cronulla-Sutherland Sharks	11	2	8
2012	Cronulla-Sutherland Sharks	24	4	16
2013	Cronulla-Sutherland Sharks	22	7	28
2014	New Zealand Warriors	18	2	8
2015	Cronulla-Sutherland Sharks	24	2	8
2016	Cronulla-Sutherland Sharks	25	4	16
2017	Cronulla-Sutherland Sharks	23	3	12
2018	Cronulla-Sutherland Sharks	21	2	8
2019	Cronulla-Sutherland Sharks	16		
	Totals	187	26	104
