= Jayden Brailey =

Australian rugby league footballer (born 1996)

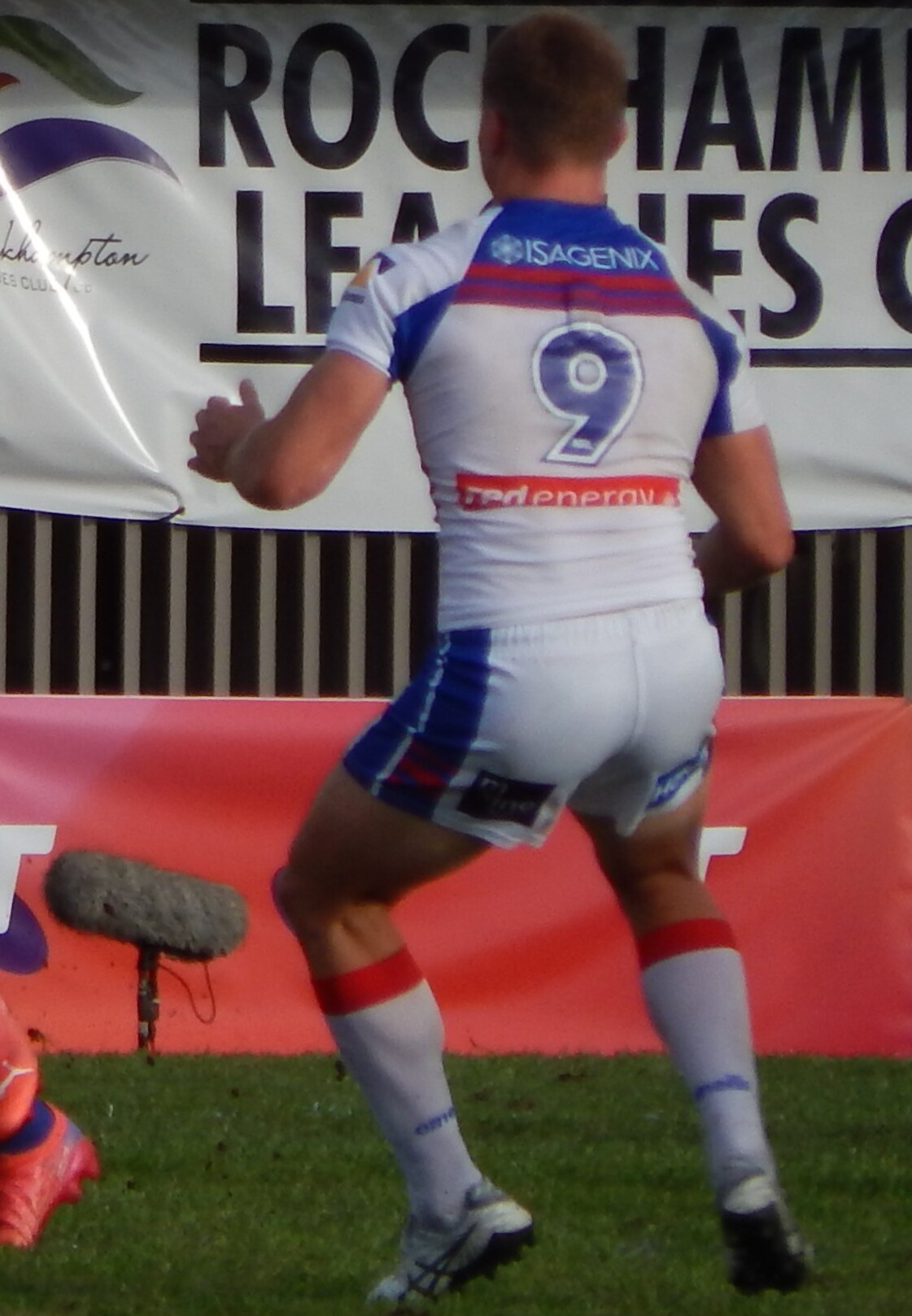

Personal information
- Born: 9 April 1996 (age 30) Hurstville, New South Wales, Australia
- Height: 180 cm (5 ft 11 in)
- Weight: 86 kg (13 st 8 lb)

Playing information
- Position: Hooker, Lock
Club
Years	Team	Pld	T	G	FG	P
2017–19	Cronulla Sharks	69	9	0	0	36
2020–25	Newcastle Knights	85	5	0	0	20
2026	Canberra Raiders	16	0	0	0	0
2027	Wests Tigers	0	0	0	0	0
	Total	170	14	0	0	56
- Relatives: Blayke Brailey (brother)

Jayden Brailey (born 9 April 1996) is an Australian professional rugby league footballer who plays as a hooker for the Wests Tigers in the National Rugby League (NRL).

He previously played for the Cronulla-Sutherland Sharks , Newcastle Knights and Canberra Raiders in the NRL.

== Background ==
Brailey was born in Hurstville, New South Wales, Australia. He is of English descent.

He played his junior football for the Aquinas Colts and attended Aquinas College, Menai. In 2014, Brailey played for the Australian Schoolboys. In 2015 and 2016, Brailey played for the Sharks NYC team. On 4 September 2016, Brailey was awarded as the 2016 Holden Cup Player of the Year.

== Playing career ==
=== 2017 ===
After the retirement of Michael Ennis after the Sharks' historical 2016 NRL Grand Final win against the Melbourne Storm, Brailey earned the job of hooker ahead of new recruits, Daniel Mortimer and Manaia Cherrington. He made his debut for the Sharks in the World Club Challenge match against the Wigan Warriors. On 2 March, Brailey made his first appearance in the NRL against the Brisbane Broncos. In Round 16 against Manly, Brailey suffered a broken jaw after attempting to tackle Manly player Dylan Walker. He was ruled out for two months and returned for in round 24.

=== 2018 ===
Brailey made 26 appearances for Cronulla in 2018 as the club fell one game short of another grand final appearance losing to Melbourne in the preliminary final.

=== 2019 ===
In July, Brailey signed a three-year contract with the Newcastle Knights starting in 2020, after being granted a release from the final year of his Cronulla contract.

Brailey made a total of 24 appearances for Cronulla in the 2019 NRL season as the club finished in 7th spot on the table and qualified for the finals. Brailey's final game for Cronulla came in the elimination final against Manly which Cronulla lost 28–16 at Brookvale Oval.

=== 2020 ===
In March, Brailey was ruled out for the remainder of the 2020 NRL season after rupturing his anterior cruciate ligament against the Wests Tigers in round 2 of the season.

=== 2021 ===
For round 1 of the 2021 NRL season, Brailey was announced as a Knights co-captain alongside Daniel Saifiti. Brailey played 23 games for Newcastle in the 2021 NRL season including the club's elimination finals loss against Parramatta.

=== 2022 ===
Brailey played eight matches for Newcastle in the 2022 NRL season as the club finished 14th on the table.

=== 2023 ===
On 10 April, Brailey was ruled out for the remainder of the 2023 NRL season with a ruptured ACL and torn meniscus injury.

=== 2024 ===
Brailey played 23 games for Newcastle in the 2024 NRL season as the club finished 8th and qualified for the finals. They were eliminated in the first week of the finals by North Queensland.

=== 2025 ===
On 26 March, Canberra announced that Brailey had signed a two-year deal to join the club in 2026. Brailey played 24 games for Newcastle in the 2025 NRL season as the club finished with the Wooden Spoon.

=== 2026 ===
On 12 August 2026, the Wests Tigers announced that Brailey had signed a two-year deal with the club from 2027.

== Statistics ==
Year	Team	Played	Tries	Pts
2017	Cronulla-Sutherland	19	4	16
2018	Cronulla-Sutherland	26	3	12
2019	Cronulla-Sutherland	24	2	8
2020	Newcastle Knights	2		
2021	Newcastle Knights	23	3	12
2022	Newcastle Knights	8	1	4
2023	Newcastle Knights	5		
2024	Newcastle Knights	23	1	4
2025	Newcastle Knights	24		
2026	Canberra Raiders	16		
	Totals	170	14	56

*denotes season competing
