= Billy Magoulias =

Greece international rugby league footballer

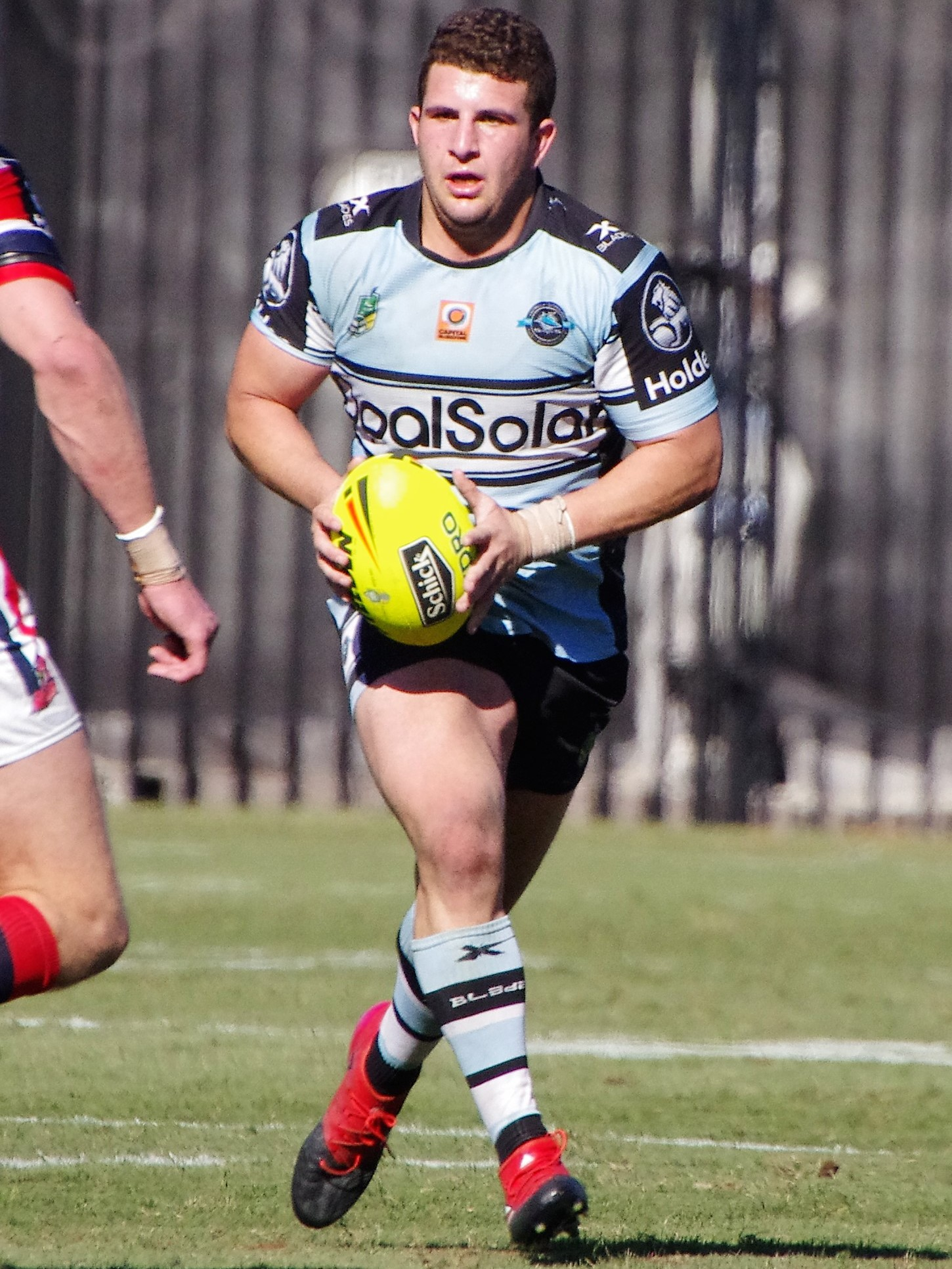

Personal information
- Full name: Billy Magoulias
- Born: 23 January 1997 (age 29) Sydney, New South Wales, Australia
- Height: 180 cm (5 ft 11 in)
- Weight: 101 kg (15 st 13 lb)

Playing information
- Position: Lock, Second-row, Prop, Hooker
Club
Years	Team	Pld	T	G	FG	P
2019–21	Cronulla Sharks	17	1	0	0	4
2022	Warrington Wolves	12	0	0	0	0
	Total	29	1	0	0	4
Representative
Years	Team	Pld	T	G	FG	P
2018–	Greece	7	1	0	0	4
- Source: As of 23 October 2022

Billy Magoulias (born 23 January 1997) is a Greece international rugby league footballer who plays as a lock for the Newtown Jets in the NSW Cup.

He previously played for the Cronulla-Sutherland Sharks in the NRL and the Warrington Wolves in the Super League.

== Background ==
Magoulias was born in Sydney, Australia, and is of Greek descent.

He played his junior rugby league for Mascot Jets in the South Sydney District Junior Rugby Football League and Cronulla Caringbah JRLFC.

== Playing career ==
=== 2018 ===
Magoulias spent the entirety of 2018 playing for Newtown who are Cronulla's feeder club side making 26 appearances. Magoulias played for Newtown in the Intrust Super Premiership NSW 18–12 grand final defeat against Canterbury-Bankstown at Leichhardt Oval.

=== 2019 ===
Magoulias made his NRL debut in round 19 of the 2019 NRL season for Cronulla-Sutherland against the North Queensland Cowboys, coming off the bench in a 16–14 victory at Shark Park.

Magoulias played for Newtown in their 2019 Canterbury Cup NSW grand final victory over Wentworthville at the Western Sydney Stadium. Magoulias set up the winning try for Newtown in the 88th minute after the game went into extra-time.

On 29 September 2019, Magoulias was named in the 2019 Canterbury Cup NSW team of the season.

The following week in the NRL State Championship final at ANZ Stadium, Magoulias set up the winning try with just five seconds of normal time remaining. With Newtown trailing the match, Magoulias kicked over the top of the Burleigh Bears defence and Newtown player Jackson Ferris raced away to score under the posts.

He was also part of Greece's 2021 Rugby League World Cup qualifying campaign where they qualified for their first Rugby League World Cup.

=== 2020 ===
In round 2 of the 2020 NRL season, he scored his first try in the top grade as Cronulla-Sutherland lost 12–10 against Melbourne at an empty Kogarah Oval.

=== 2021 ===
He played 11 games for Cronulla in the 2021 NRL season which saw the club narrowly miss the finals by finishing 9th on the table.

=== 2022 ===
Magoulias made his club debut for Warrington in their 16–12 loss against Wakefield Trinity in the Challenge Cup. On 14 June, Magoulias was released from his Warrington contract with immediate effect on compassionate grounds. On 22 June, Magoulias re-joined NSW Cup side Newtown, He captained the side in season 2023.

=== 2024 ===
On 29 September, he played for Newtown in their 2024 NSW Cup Grand Final victory over North Sydney, he came up with a vital try assist to forward Jordan Leiu.

=== 2025 ===
On 27 September 2025, Magoulias announced his retirement from rugby league.
