= Barry Russell (Cronulla) =

Australian rugby league footballer

Personal information
- Born: 1965 (age 60–61)

Playing information
- Position: Halfback, Five-eighth
Club
Years	Team	Pld	T	G	FG	P
1985–91	Cronulla-Sutherland	76	31	0	0	124

Barry Russell is an Australian former professional rugby league footballer who played in the 1980s and 1990s. He played in the halves for the Cronulla-Sutherland Sharks club of the NSWRL Premiership with whom he won the Rothmans Medal in 1988.

A member of the same Jersey Flegg Cup team as Andrew Ettingshausen and Jonathan Docking, Russell made his first-grade debut in 1985. Towards the end of the season, Russell was the team's regular five-eighth.

Russell had the first of two shoulder reconstructions after the 1985 season, and took no part in 1986. His career was often hampered by injury.

Despite missing six games of the 1988 NSWRL season due to injury, 23-year-old Russell was awarded the Rothmans Medal.
