= Kyle Flanagan (rugby league) =

Australian professional rugby league footballer

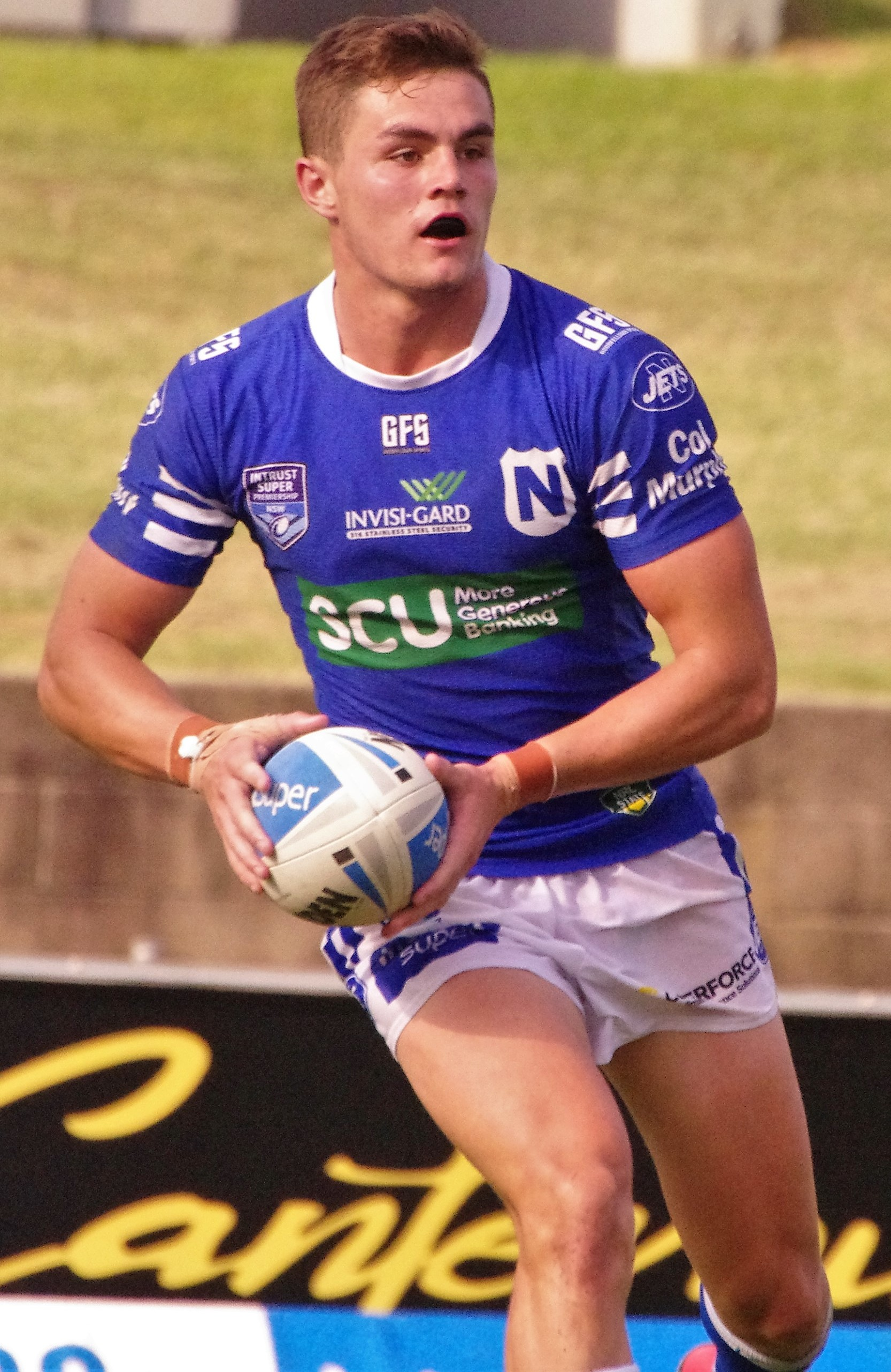

Personal information
- Born: 15 September 1998 (age 28) Sydney, New South Wales, Australia
- Height: 183 cm (6 ft 0 in)
- Weight: 85 kg (13 st 5 lb)

Playing information
- Position: Halfback, Five-eighth
Club
Years	Team	Pld	T	G	FG	P
2018–19	Cronulla Sharks	9	1	19	0	42
2020	Sydney Roosters	20	4	91	0	198
2021–23	Canterbury Bulldogs	50	7	29	0	86
2024–	St. George Illawarra	65	13	48	0	148
	Total	144	25	187	0	474
Representative
Years	Team	Pld	T	G	FG	P
2018	NSW Residents	1	1	6	0	16
2025	Prime Minister's XIII	1	0	0	0	0
- Source: As of 5 September 2026
- Father: Shane Flanagan

Kyle Flanagan (born 15 September 1998) is an Australian professional rugby league footballer who plays as a halfback and five-eighth for the St. George Illawarra Dragons in the National Rugby League.

He previously played for the Cronulla-Sutherland Sharks, Sydney Roosters and the Canterbury-Bankstown Bulldogs in the NRL.

== Background ==
Kyle Flanagan was born in Sydney, New South Wales, Australia on 15 September 1998. He is the son of former St. George Illawarra coach Shane Flanagan.

== Career ==
=== 2018 ===
In Round 24 of the 2018 NRL season, Flanagan made his NRL debut under the coaching of his father in the Sharks' 38–12 win over the Newcastle Knights. On 23 September 2018, Flanagan played for Newtown in the Intrust Super Premiership NSW grand final defeat against Canterbury.

=== 2019 ===
In Round 13 of the 2019 NRL season, Flanagan scored 18 individual points which included a try and seven goals as Cronulla defeated Parramatta 42-22 at Shark Park. On 22 July 2019, Flanagan signed a two-year deal to join the Sydney Roosters starting in the 2020 NRL season.

=== 2020 ===
In round 16 of the 2020 NRL season, he kicked nine goals in a 58-12 victory over Brisbane at the Sydney Cricket Ground. Flanagan finished his first season with the Roosters with 4 tries and 91 goals.

Flanagan played a total of 20 games for the Sydney Roosters in the 2020 NRL season as the club finished fourth on the table. Flanagan played in both finals games as the club were eliminated in straight sets from the finals series losing to Penrith and Canberra. In the wake of their exit from the finals, the club informed Flanagan that he would not be required for the 2021 season.

On 26 October 2020, he signed a three-year deal with the Canterbury-Bankstown Bulldogs.

=== 2021 ===
In round 1 of the 2021 NRL season, he made his debut for Canterbury-Bankstown against Newcastle which Canterbury lost 32-16.

In round 9 of the 2021 NRL season, Flanagan was substituted off the field by Canterbury head coach Trent Barrett after a poor first half performance in the club's 32-12 loss against St. George. Flanagan was then dropped from the first grade team until the round 16 game against Manly Warringah Sea Eagles, when he was reselected after four Canterbury players were side-lined by NSW Health after breaching NRL restrictions related to COVID-19.

Flanagan made a total of 13 appearances for Canterbury in the 2021 NRL season as the club finished last and claimed the Wooden Spoon.

=== 2022 ===
Flanagan made a total of 20 appearances for Canterbury in the 2022 NRL season as the club finished 12th on the table and missed the finals.

=== 2023 ===
In round 1 of the 2023 NRL season, Flanagan was sent to the sin bin during Canterbury's 31-6 loss against Manly at Brookvale Oval. Flanagan played a total of 17 games for Canterbury in the 2023 NRL season as Canterbury finished 15th on the table. On 7 September, Flanagan signed a two-year deal to join St. George Illawarra starting in 2024.

=== 2024 ===
In round 1 of the 2024 NRL season, Flanagan made his club debut for St. George Illawarra as they upset the Gold Coast 28-4. During the club's round 23 loss against Canterbury, Flanagan was placed on report for allegedly biting Stephen Crichton. On 13 August, Flanagan was suspended for four games after being found guilty of biting an opponent. Flanagan played 20 games for St. George Illawarra in the 2024 NRL season as the club finished 11th on the table. On 19 December, St. George Illawarra announced that Flanagan had re-signed with the club until the end of the 2027 season.

=== 2025 ===
In round 2 of the 2025 NRL season, Flanagan scored two tries for St. George Illawarra in their 25-24 loss against South Sydney. Flanagan played every game for St. George Illawarra in the 2025 NRL season despite supporters demanding that he should be demoted to the NSW Cup in place of Lachlan Ilias. St. George Illawarra would finish the season in 15th place recording only eight wins.

On 12 October 2025 he made his debut in the Prime Minister's XIII 28-10 win over PNG Prime Minister's XIII in Port Moresby

=== 2026 ===
Flanagan played 19 games for St. George Illawarra in the 2026 NRL season as the club finished with the Wooden Spoon. It was the clubs first wooden spoon and the first any St. George affiliated side had received since 1938.

== Statistics ==
Year	Team	Games	Tries	Goals	Pts
2018	Cronulla-Sutherland Sharks	1			
2019	Cronulla-Sutherland Sharks	8	1	19	42
2020	Sydney Roosters	20	4	91	198
2021	Canterbury-Bankstown Bulldogs	13	1	17	38
2022	Canterbury-Bankstown Bulldogs	20	4	5	26
2023	Canterbury-Bankstown Bulldogs	17	2	7	22
2024	St. George Illawarra Dragons	20	5	11	42
2025	St. George Illawarra Dragons	24	7	32	92
2026	St. George Illawarra Dragons	6		1	2
	Totals	129	24	182	462
