= Sosaia Feki =

Tonga international rugby league footballer

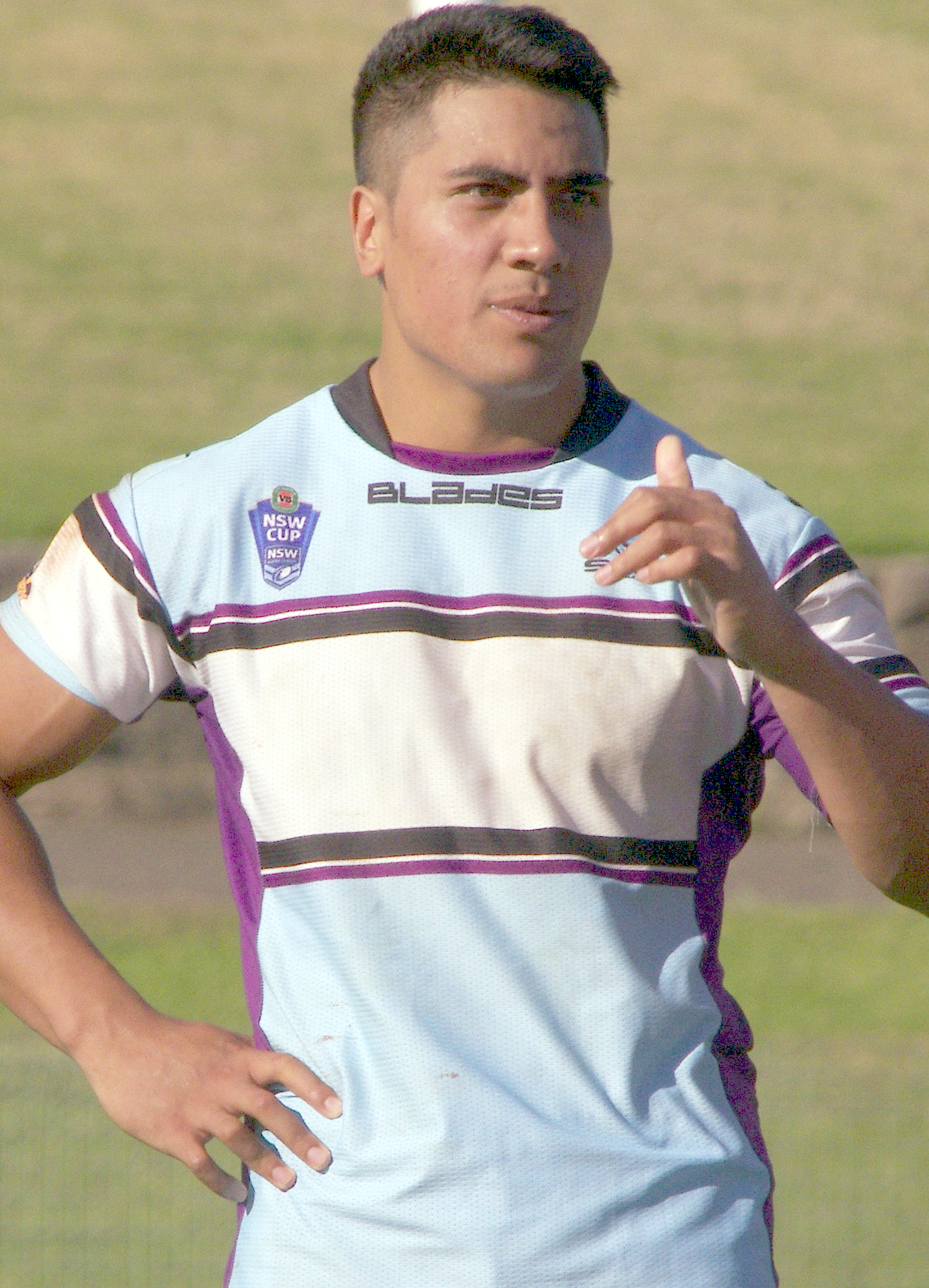

Personal information
- Born: 9 May 1991 (age 35) Auckland, New Zealand
- Height: 6 ft 2 in (1.88 m)
- Weight: 15 st 13 lb (101 kg)

Playing information
- Position: Wing
Club
Years	Team	Pld	T	G	FG	P
2013–19	Cronulla Sharks	148	67	0	0	268
2020–22	Castleford Tigers	2	0	0	0	0
2022(loan)	→ Featherstone Rovers	0	0	0	0	0
2022(loan)	→ Sheffield Eagles	0	0	0	0	0
	Total	150	67	0	0	268
Representative
Years	Team	Pld	T	G	FG	P
2013–15	Tonga	2	0	0	0	0
- Source: As of 14 March 2023

Sosaia Feki (born 9 May 1991), anglicised Josiah Feki, also known by the nickname of "The PM" is a Tonga international rugby league footballer who plays on the wing for Western Suburbs Red Devils in the Illawarra Rugby League.

He played for the Cronulla-Sutherland Sharks in the NRL, and was part of the Cronulla team that won their maiden premiership title in the 2016 season.

== Background ==
Feki was born in Auckland, New Zealand and is of Tongan descent.

Feki played his junior football for the Bay Roskill Vikings before being signed by the New Zealand Warriors. Feki played for the Warriors NYC team in 2010 and 2011. In October 2011, Feki played for the Junior Kiwis.

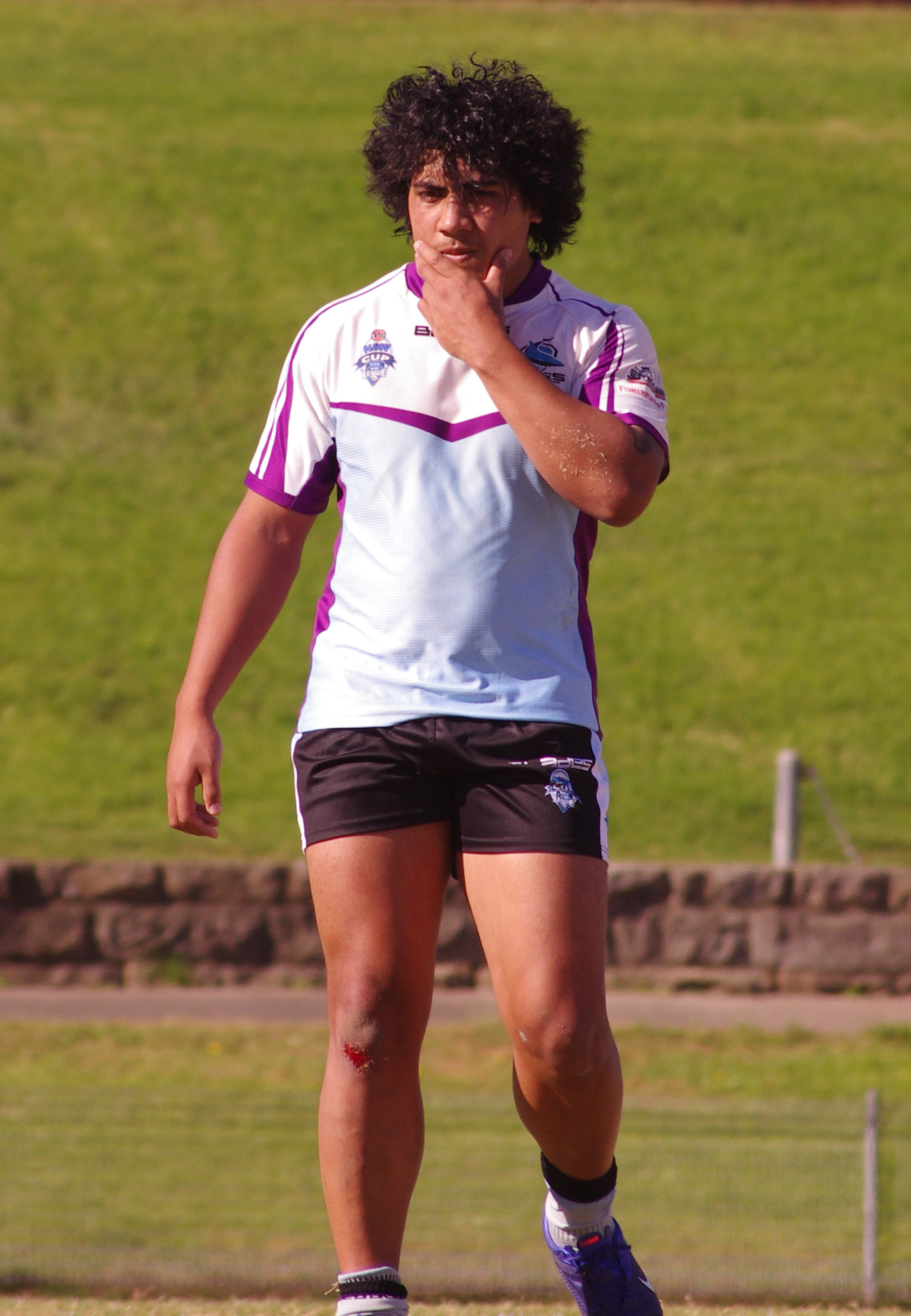
Feki playing for the Sharks in 2012

In 2012, Feki joined the Cronulla-Sutherland Sharks.

== Playing career ==
=== 2013 ===
In round 8 of the 2013 NRL season, Feki made his National Rugby League (NRL) début for the Cronulla-Sutherland Sharks as a wing in the 21–20 victory over the Newcastle Knights at Hunter Stadium. In his second game in Round 9 against the Wests Tigers at SFS, Feki scored his first and second NRL career tries in the Sharks 30–6 win. Feki finished his debut year in the NRL with him playing in 19 matches and scoring 7 tries for the Sharks in the 2013 NRL season. On 8 October 2013, Feki was named in the 24 man Tonga national rugby league team squad for the 2013 World Cup. Feki played in 1 match in the tournament in Tonga's 26–24 loss to the Scotland at Derwent Park in Workington.

=== 2014 ===
In February 2014, Feki was included in the Sharks inaugural 2014 Auckland Nines squad. On 11 July 2014, Feki extended his contract with Cronulla-Sutherland for three years through till the end of the 2017 season. Feki was the Cronulla-Sutherland Sharks highest tryscorer of the 2014 NRL season with 9 tries in 20 matches although his efforts were not enough to save the club from finishing last on the table.

On 9 September 2014, Feki was selected for the New Zealand 2014 Four Nations train squad. On 7 October 2014, Feki was selected in the New Zealand national rugby league team final 24-man squad for the series, but didn't play a match in the tournament.

=== 2015 ===
On 31 January and 1 February, Feki played for the Sharks in the 2015 NRL Auckland Nines. On 2 May, he played for Tonga in their Polynesian Cup clash with Pacific rivals Samoa, playing on the wing in Tonga's 18–16 loss at Cbus Super Stadium. He finished off the 2015 season having played in 23 matches and scoring 7 tries for the Sharks.

=== 2016 ===
In February, Feki played for the Sharks in the 2016 NRL Auckland Nines. In Round 10 against the Newcastle Knights, he scored a hat-trick of tries in the Sharks' 62–0 win.

For a career best 14 tries from 24 appearances, 248 runs amassing 2588 metres, 13 linebreaks and 51 tackle breaks. In October, Feki played in Cronulla-Sutherland's 2016 NRL Grand Final victory over Melbourne Storm, however, he was forced off with a knee injury in the second half. This was the first NRL Premiership for both Feki and the Cronulla-Sutherland Sharks.

=== 2017 ===
Feki was scheduled to come off contract, however continued performance led to re-signing with the Sharks through to the 2019 season. Feki, a Cronulla fan favourite stated 'I'm looking forward to it' and 'I'm hoping to stay as long as I can.'

=== 2018 ===
Feki made 16 appearances for Cronulla in 2018 as the club reached the preliminary final but fell short of another grand final appearance losing to Melbourne 22–6. The match was also remembered for Melbourne player Billy Slater hitting Feki in the first half with an illegal shoulder charge when Feki was close to scoring a try. Slater was later cleared of any wrongdoing and was allowed to play in the grand final the following week.

=== 2019 ===
On 3 July, Feki signed a three-year contract to join English side Castleford Tigers for the 2020 Super League season.

In round 25 against the Wests Tigers, Feki scored 2 tries as Cronulla-Sutherland won the match 25–8 at Leichhardt Oval. Cronulla needed to win the match to ensure that they would reach the finals as was also the case for Wests.

Feki's final game for Cronulla came in the elimination final against Manly at Brookvale Oval which Cronulla lost 28–16.

=== 2020 ===
On 4 March 2020, it was reported that Feki suffered a pre-season injury that would delay his Castleford Tigers début

=== 2021 ===
On 18 February, Castleford Tigers announced that Feki had sustained a ruptured Achilles tendon in pre-season training.

=== 2022 ===
On 7 August 2022, Feki played his first game in 693 days as Castleford were defeated 20–12 by St Helens RFC.
