= 2024 NSW Cup season =

2024 New South Wales Cup
- Duration: 7 March - 29 September
- Teams: 13
- Premiers: Newtown Jets
- Minor premiers: North Sydney Bears
- Wooden spoon: Western Suburbs Magpies
- Matches played: 162
- Top points scorer(s): Kieran Hayman (212)
- Top try-scorer(s): Allan Fitzgibbon (21)

The 2024 season of the New South Wales Cup was the 118th season of the premier state rugby league competition in New South Wales.

== Season summary ==
The 2024 season of the New South Wales Cup commenced on 7 March. Teams played 26 regular competition rounds, with the top five teams qualifying for the final series in September.

== Teams ==
There are 13 teams competing in the competition in 2024, with eleven based in New South Wales itself, as well as one in the Australian Capital Territory and one from New Zealand.

Club	NRL Affiliate	Home Ground(s)	Head Coach
Blacktown Workers; Sea Eagles	Manly Warringah; Sea Eagles	4 Pines Park (6) & HE Laybutt Field (5)	Wayne Lambkin
Canberra Raiders		GIO Stadium (9), Raiders Belconnen (1) & Seiffert Oval (1)	Brock Shepperd
Canterbury Bulldogs		Belmore Sports Ground (6) & Stadium Australia (5)	Michael Potter
Newcastle Knights		McDonald Jones Stadium (10), Newcastle Permanent Centre of Excellence (2)	Ronald Griffiths
Newtown Jets	Cronulla Sharks	Henson Park (11), PointsBet Stadium (1)	George Ndaira
New Zealand Warriors		Mount Smart Stadium (7), North Harbour Stadium (3) & Navigation Homes Stadium (1)	David Tangata-Toa
North Sydney; Bears	Melbourne Storm	North Sydney Oval (12)	~~Pat Weisner~~ → Kieran Dempsey
Parramatta Eels		CommBank Stadium (9), Eric Tweedale Stadium (2) & Lidcombe Oval (1)	Nathan Cayless
Penrith Panthers		BlueBet Stadium (10), St Marys Leagues Stadium (1)	Ben Harden
South Sydney Rabbitohs		Accor Stadium (7), Redfern Oval (3), Coogee Oval (1), Central Coast Stadium (1)	Joe O'Callaghan
Sydney Roosters		Wentworth Park (9), Allianz Stadium (2), Central Coast Stadium (1)	Brett Morris
St. George Illawarra Dragons		Collegians Sporting Complex Wollongong (7), WIN Stadium (2), Netstrata Jubilee Stadium (2) & Sid Parrish Park (1)	Ben Woolf
Western Suburbs Magpies	Western Suburbs Tigers	Lidcombe Oval (7), Campbelltown Stadium (3) & Leichhardt Oval (1)	Aaron Payne

== Regular season ==
=== Ladder ===
2024 NSW Cup
Pos	Team	Pld	W	D	L	B	PF	PA	PD	Pts
1	North Sydney Bears	24	15	2	7	2	560	479	+81	36
2	Newtown Jets	24	15	1	8	2	654	492	+162	35
3	Canberra Raiders	24	14	2	8	2	713	456	+257	34
4	New Zealand Warriors	24	14	1	9	2	590	506	+84	33
5	Penrith Panthers	24	13	3	8	2	602	520	+82	33
6	St. George Illawarra Dragons	24	14	0	10	2	580	447	+133	32
7	Canterbury-Bankstown Bulldogs	24	14	0	10	2	622	547	+75	32
8	Newcastle Knights	24	11	0	13	2	595	650	-55	26
9	Blacktown Workers Sea Eagles	24	10	0	14	2	566	704	-138	24
10	Sydney Roosters	24	9	1	14	2	540	583	-43	23
11	Parramatta Eels	24	9	1	14	2	535	678	-143	23
12	South Sydney Rabbitohs	24	6	1	17	2	482	658	-176	17
13	Western Suburbs Magpies	24	6	0	18	2	454	773	-319	16

== Finals series ==
The top five teams qualified for the finals series, with these being Norths, Newtown, Canberra, New Zealand and Penrith.

Home	Score	Away	Match Information			
Home	Score	Away	Date and Time	Venue	Referee(s)	Crowd
QUALIFYING AND ELIMINATION FINAL
New Zealand Warriors	12 – 24	Penrith Panthers	Saturday 7 September, 1:00pm	Leichhardt Oval	Kieren Irons	
Newtown Jets	38 – 16	Canberra Raiders	Saturday 7 September, 5:00pm	Leichhardt Oval	Damian Brady	
SEMI-FINALS
Canberra Raiders	30 – 14	Penrith Panthers	Saturday 15 September, 1:00pm	Leichhardt Oval	Damian Brady	
North Sydney Bears	18 – 16	Newtown Jets	Saturday 15 September, 5:00pm	Leichhardt Oval	Kieren Irons	
PRELIMINARY FINAL
Canberra Raiders	16 – 18	Newtown Jets	Saturday 21 September, 3:00 pm	Leichhardt Oval	Kieren Irons	
GRAND FINAL
North Sydney Bears	22 – 28	Newtown Jets	Sunday 29 September, 3:00pm	CommBank Stadium	Kieren Irons	10,386

Qualifying and elimination finals
2	Newtown	38
3	Canberra	16
4	New Zealand	12
5	Penrith	24

Semi-finals
1	North Sydney	18
Newtown	16
Canberra	30
Penrith	14

Preliminary final
Canberra	16
Newtown	18

Grand final
North Sydney	22
Newtown	28

== Grand Final ==
2024 The Knock-On Effect NSW Cup Grand Final

Sunday, 29 September
15:00 AEST (UTC+10)

North Sydney Bears	22 – 28	Newtown Jets
Tries: 4 Garlick 20'; Faalogo 34'; Fitzgibbon 43'; Wilson 58'; Goals: 4 Hayman 21', 45', 60' (3/4)	1st: 10–16; 2nd: 12–12; Report	Tries: 5 Rodwell 16'; Vea'ila 26'; Hiroti 39'; Leiu 52'; Hamlin-Uele 64'; Goals: 4 Puru 18', 39', 54', 66' (4/5)

CommBank Stadium, Sydney
Attendance: 10,386
Referee: Kieren Irons
Player of the Match: Niwhai Puru

Team details
North Sydney Bears		Position	Newtown Jets
Name	Number	Position	Number	Name
Sualauvi Fa'alogo	20	Fullback	1	Liam Ison
Allan Fitzgibbon	2	Wing	2	Tom Rodwell
Israel Ogden	3	Centre	3	Chris Vea'ila
Dean Ieremia	4	Centre	4	Mawene Hiroti
Tui Katoa	5	Wing	5	Samuel Stonestreet
Kieran Hayman	1	Five eighth	6	Khaled Rajab
Harradyn Wilson	7	Half back	7	Niwhai Puru
Kurt De Luis (c)	8	Prop forward	10	Tuku Hau Tapuha
Bronson Garlick	9	Hooker	9	Jayden Berrell
Tepai Moeroa	10	Prop forward	14	Braden Hamlin-Uele
Joe Chan	11	Second row	11	Kyle Pickering
Matt Stimson	12	Second row	12	Billy Burns (c)
Ativalu Lisati	13	Lock forward	13	Blake Hosking
Nathaniel Roache	14	Interchange	14	Jordin Leiu
Regan Hughes	15	Interchange	17	Billy Magoulias
Phillip Makatoa	16	Interchange	18	Samuel Healey
Ben Talty	17	Interchange	19	Brad Fearnley
Coby Thomas (not used)	18	Concussion substitute	14	Rhys Dakin (not used)
Kieran Dempsey		Coach		George Ndaira

== NRL State Championship ==
As premiers of the NSW Cup, the Newtown Jets will face Queensland Cup premiers Norths Devils in the NRL State Championship match.

2024 NRL State Championship

Sunday, 6 October
13:20 AEDT (UTC+11)

Newtown Jets	18-20	Norths Devils
Tries: 4 Stonestreet 16', 31', 45'; Puru 23'; Goals: 1 Puru 1/4 17'	1st: 14-10; 2nd: 4-10; Report	Tries: 4 Simbiken 4'; Lipp 39'; Keeley 55', 74'; Goals: 2 Lipp 2/4 6', 56'

Accor Stadium, Sydney
Referee: Liam Kennedy
Touch judges: Jarrod Cole, Kieren Irons
Bunker: Peter Gough

== Awards ==
- Player of the Year:
- Top Tryscorer: Allan Fitzgibbon (21)
- Top Pointscorer: Kieran Hayman (212)

=== Team of the Year ===
Position	Nat	Winner	Club
Fullback	(Australia)	Jake Toby	North Sydney Bears
Wing	(New Zealand)	Savelio Tamale	St. George Illawarra Dragons
Centre	(Australia)	James Schiller	Canberra Raiders
Centre	(Australia)	Tyrone Peachey	Penrith Panthers
Wing	(New Zealand)	Watson Heleta	Blacktown Workers Sea Eagles
Five-eighth	(England)	Will Pryce	Newcastle Knights
Halfback	(Australia)	Adam Cook	Canberra Raiders
Prop	(Australia)	Kurt De Luis	North Sydney Bears
Hooker	(Australia)	Jayden Berrell	Newtown Jets
Prop	(Serbia)	Jordan Grant	Penrith Panthers
Second-row	(Samoa)	Jacob Laban	New Zealand Warriors
Second-row	(Australia)	Billy Burns	Newtown Jets
Lock	(Australia)	Hohepa Puru	Canberra Raiders

== See also ==
- New South Wales Rugby League
- 2024 NRL season
