= 2024 Cronulla-Sutherland Sharks season =

43rd Parramatta Eels season

- NRL Rank: 4th
- Play-off result: PF
- 2024 record: Wins: 16; losses: 8
- Points scored: For: 653; against: 431

Team information
- CEO: Dino Mezzatesta
- Coach: (Australia) Craig Fitzgibbon
- Captain: (Australia) Dale Finucane (Australia) Cameron McInnes
- Stadium: PointsBet Stadium (Capacity: 15,000)

Top scorers
- Tries: (New Zealand) Ronaldo Mulitalo (18)
- Goals: (Australia) Nicho Hynes (61)
- Points: (Australia) Nicho Hynes (131)
← 2023	List of seasons	2025 →

The 2024 Cronulla-Sutherland Sharks season is the 58th season in the club's history and they compete in the National Rugby League.

The club is coached by Craig Fitzgibbon in his third season with the Sharks and captained by Dale Finucane and Cameron McInnes. On Tuesday 23 April, in the lead up to Round 8, co-captain Dale Finucane announced his immediate retirement from the NRL on medical advice, due to repeated head knocks.

== Milestones ==
- Round 1: Jack Williams played in his 100th NRL and club game.
- Round 2: Tuku Hau Tapuha makes his club debut having previously played for the Sydney Roosters.
- Round 2: Dale Finucane plays his 250th NRL match.
- Round 2: Cameron McInnes plays in his 50th club match.
- Round 3: Billy Burns makes his club debut having previously played for the St. George Illawarra Dragons.
- Round 4: Kayal Iro scores his 1st NRL try.
- Round 7: Samuel Stonestreet makes his NRL debut and scores his first NRL try.
- Round 7: Braden Hamlin-Uele plays his 100th NRL match.
- Round 8: Braden Hamlin-Uele plays his 100th club match.
- Round 11: Oregon Kaufusi plays his 100th NRL match.
- Round 13: Sione Katoa plays his 100th NRL and club match.
- Round 13: Daniel Atkinson scores his 1st NRL try.
- Round 14: Ronaldo Mulitalo plays his 100th NRL and club match.
- Round 17: Siosifa Talakai plays his 100th NRL match.
- Round 21: Liam Ison and Jayden Berrell make their NRL debuts.
- Round 23: William Kennedy plays his 100th NRL and club match.
- Round 23: Jesse Ramien scores his 50th try for the club.
- Finals Week 1: Toby Rudolf plays his 100th NRL and club match.
- Finals Week 3: Nicho Hynes plays his 100th NRL match.

== 2024 Squad ==
Cronulla Sharks 2024 squad
Top 30 squad - 2024 NRL season			Supplementary list	Coaching staff
Daniel Atkinson – FE, WG, FB; Jayden Berrell – HK; Blayke Brailey – HK, HB; Billy Burns – SR; Jesse Colquhoun – PR, SR; Kade Dykes – FB, FE; Michael Gabrael – CE; Braden Hamlin-Uele – PR; Tuku Hau Tapuha – PR; Thomas Hazelton – PR	Royce Hunt – PR; Nicho Hynes (vc) – HB; Kayal Iro – CE; Sione Katoa – WG; Oregon Kaufusi – PR; Will Kennedy – FB; Cameron McInnes (c) – LK, HK; Ronaldo Mulitalo – WG; Briton Nikora – SR; Niwhai Puru – HB	Jesse Ramien – CE; Toby Rudolf – PR; Samuel Stonestreet – WG; Siosifa Talakai – SR, CE; Siteni Taukamo – WG; Braydon Trindall – FE, HB; Jack Williams – LK, SR; Teig Wilton – SR	Max Bradbury – PR; Dylan Coutts – SR; Mawene Hiroti – CE, FE, FB, WG; Liam Ison – FB; Extended squad: Sam Healey – HK; Blake Hosking – LK, SR; Tom Rodwell – WG; Chris Vea'ila – CE, WG	Head coach: Craig Fitzgibbon; Assistant coaches: Josh Hannay; Daniel Holdsworth; Steve Price; Legend: (c) Captain(s); (vc) Vice-captain(s); Updated: 28 September 2024; Source(s): Sharks Team Profiles

== Squad changes ==
=== Transfers in ===
Nat	Pos	Player	From	Ref
(Australia)	SR	Billy Burns	St. George Illawarra Dragons	
(Australia)	C	Michael Gabrael	Canterbury-Bankstown Bulldogs	
(Australia)	FB	Liam Ison	Penrith Panthers	

=== Transfers out ===
Nat	Pos	Player	To	Ref
(Australia)	SR	Wade Graham	Retirement	
(Australia)	W	Matt Ikuvalu	Catalans Dragons (mid season)	
(Australia)	FE	Matt Moylan	Leigh Leopards	
(Australia)	FB, W, C	Connor Tracey	Canterbury-Bankstown Bulldogs	
(Australia)	PR	Josh Finau	Western Suburbs Magpies (NSW Cup)	

== Pre-season ==
Round 1: 17 February 2024	Newcastle Knights	44–18	Cronulla-Sutherland Sharks	Gosford
13:45 AEDT	Tries: McCarthy 16'; Lucas 26', 38'; Jones 36'; Armstrong 51', 64'; Cogger 53'; Pryce 57'; Goals: Gamble 1/1 17'; Cogger 3/3 26', 37', 39'; Pryce 2/4 55', 59'	[Details Report]	Tries: Berrell 7'; Katoa 11'; Rodwell 66'; Goals: Hiroti 2/2 8', 12'; Puru 1/1 68'; Sin bin: Hazelton (yellow card) 49' to 59'	Attendance: 7,952; Referee: Kasey Badger

Round 2: 23 February 2024	Cronulla-Sutherland Sharks	12–6	Canterbury-Bankstown Bulldogs	Sydney
20:00 AEDT	Tries: Wilton 12'; Vea'ila 72'; Goals: Trindall 2/2 14', 74'; Sin bin: Nikora (yellow card) 29' to 39'	[Report; Details Report]	Tries: Preston 32'; Goals: Burton 1/1 33'	Stadium: Belmore Sports Ground; Referee: Adam Gee

== Regular season ==
=== Ladder ===
Pos	Team	Pld	W	D	L	B	PF	PA	PD	Pts	Qualification
1	Melbourne Storm	24	19	0	5	3	692	449	+243	44	Advance to finals series
2	Penrith Panthers (P)	24	17	0	7	3	580	394	+186	40	Advance to finals series
3	Sydney Roosters	24	16	0	8	3	738	463	+275	38	Advance to finals series
4	Cronulla-Sutherland Sharks	24	16	0	8	3	653	431	+222	38	Advance to finals series
5	North Queensland Cowboys	24	15	0	9	3	657	568	+89	36	Advance to finals series
6	Canterbury-Bankstown Bulldogs	24	14	0	10	3	529	433	+96	34	Advance to finals series
7	Manly Warringah Sea Eagles	24	13	1	10	3	634	521	+113	33	Advance to finals series
8	Newcastle Knights	24	12	0	12	3	470	510	−40	30	Advance to finals series
9	Canberra Raiders	24	12	0	12	3	474	601	−127	30	
10	Dolphins	24	11	0	13	3	577	578	−1	28	
11	St. George Illawarra Dragons	24	11	0	13	3	508	634	−126	28	
12	Brisbane Broncos	24	10	0	14	3	537	607	−70	26	
13	New Zealand Warriors	24	9	1	14	3	512	574	−62	25	
14	Gold Coast Titans	24	8	0	16	3	488	656	−168	22	
15	Parramatta Eels	24	7	0	17	3	561	716	−155	20	
16	South Sydney Rabbitohs	24	7	0	17	3	494	682	−188	20	
17	Wests Tigers	24	6	0	18	3	463	750	−287	18	

Source: National Rugby League
(P) Premiers

=== Results by round ===
Round	1	2	3	4	5	6	7	8	9	10	11	12	13	14	15	16	17	18	19	20	21	22	23	24	25	26	27
Ground	A	H	A	H	–	A	H	A	H	A	N	H	A	A	H	–	A	H	H	–	A	H	A	H	A	H	A
Result	W	W	L	W	B	W	W	W	W	W	W	L	L	W	L	B	L	L	W	B	L	W	W	W	W	L	W
Position	8	3	10	4	4	1	1	1	1	1	1	1	2	2	3	3	3	4	4	3	4	4	4	4	3	4	4
Points	2	4	4	6	8	10	12	14	16	18	20	20	20	22	22	24	24	24	26	28	28	30	32	34	36	36	38

Source: National Rugby League
A = Away; H = Home; N = Neutral; B = Bye; W = Win; D = Draw; L = Loss

=== Matches ===
The league fixtures were announced on 13 November 2023.

Win Draw Loss Fixtures

Round 1: 8 March 2024	New Zealand Warriors	12–16	Cronulla-Sutherland Sharks	Auckland
20:00 NZDT	Tries: Fonua-Blake 7'; Metcalf 12'; Goals: Johnson 2/2 9', 13'	[Report Report]	Tries: Ramien 34'; Mulitalo 41'; Talakai 57'; Goals: Trindall 1/1 36'; Hynes 1/2 58'	Stadium: Go Media Stadium; Attendance: 24,076; Referee: Peter Gough

Round 2: 15 March 2024	Cronulla-Sutherland Sharks	25–6	Canterbury-Bankstown Bulldogs	Cronulla
18:00 AEDT	Tries: Trindall 23'; Katoa 55'; Mulitalo 64'; Wilton 74'; Goals: Hynes 4/4 24', 57', 69', 75'; Field goals: Hynes 79'; Sin bin: Nikora (yellow card) 5' to 15'	[Report Report]	Tries: Wilson 12'; Goals: Burton 1/1 14'	Stadium: PointsBet Stadium; Attendance: 12,928; Referee: Ziggy Przeklasa-Adamski

Round 3: 23 March 2024	Wests Tigers	32–6	Cronulla-Sutherland Sharks	Leichhardt
19:35 AEDT	Tries: Papali'i 20'; Seyfarth 34'; Olam 38'; Bula 51', 69'; Goals: Koroisau 4/4 22', 35', 45 pen', 53'; Sezer 2/2 39', 71'	[Report Report]	Tries: Hazelton 13'; Goals: Hynes 1/1 14'	Stadium: Leichhardt Oval; Attendance: 15,990; Referee: Chris Butler

Round 4: 31 March 2024	Cronulla-Sutherland Sharks	36–22	Canberra Raiders	Cronulla
18:15 AEDT	Tries: Trindall 27'; Mulitalo 33', 62'; Brailey 36'; Iro 58'; Katoa 79'; Goals: Hynes 6/6 29', 35', 37', 60', 63', 79'	[Report Report]	Tries: Schiller 11', 71'; Savage 17'; Levi 23'; Goals: Fogarty 3/4 13', 18', 24'	Stadium: PointsBet Stadium; Attendance: 12,692; Referee: Todd Smith

Round 5 (Bye for Cronulla-Sutherland Sharks)

Round 6: 13 April 2024	South Sydney Rabbitohs	22–34	Cronulla-Sutherland Sharks	Sydney Olympic Park
19:35 AEST	Tries: Chee-Kam 16'; Milne 55'; Burgess 68'; Tass 74'; Goals: Hawkins 3/5 18', 56', 69'	[Report Report]	Tries: Mulitalo 12', 33'; Wilton 28', 65'; Katoa 48'; Brailey 78'; Goals: Hynes 5/6 30', 35', 50', 66', 78'	Stadium: Accor Stadium; Attendance: 12,207; Referee: Ashley Klein

Round 7: 21 April 2024	Cronulla-Sutherland Sharks	42–6	North Queensland Cowboys	Cronulla
16:05 AEST	Tries: Kennedy 2'; Hazelton 20'; Stonestreet 25'; Trindall 30', 46'; Mulitalo 54', 73'; Goals: Hynes 7/7 4', 22', 26', 32', 48', 56', 75'	[Report Report]	Tries: Holmes 62'; Goals: Holmes 1/1 64'	Stadium: PointsBet Stadium; Attendance: 12,415; Referee: Adam Gee

Round 8: 28 April 2024	Canberra Raiders	0–40	Cronulla-Sutherland Sharks	Canberra
16:05 AEST		[Report Report]	Tries: McInnes 12'; Hazelton 17'; Katoa 25', 61'; Nikora 45'; Hynes 54'; Ramien 74'; Goals: Hynes 6/7 14', 18', 26', 46', 55', 63'	Stadium: GIO Stadium; Attendance: 15,820; Referee: Peter Gough

Round 9: 5 May 2024	Cronulla-Sutherland Sharks	20–10	St. George Illawarra Dragons	Cronulla
16:05 AEST	Tries: Kaufusi 13'; Talakai 45'; Hazelton 64'; Goals: Hynes 4/4 15', 46', 66', 77 pen'	[Report Report]	Tries: Ravalawa 26', 39'; Goals: Lomax 1/2 39'	Stadium: PointsBet Stadium; Attendance: 9,731; Referee: Todd Smith

Round 10: 11 May 2024	Melbourne Storm	18–25	Cronulla-Sutherland Sharks	Melbourne
19:35 AEST	Tries: Katoa 17'; Smith 31'; Wishart 68'; Goals: Meaney 3/4 14 pen', 33', 70'; Sin bin: Grant (yellow card) 35' to 45'	[Report Report]	Tries: Hau Tapuha 23'; Kaufusi 36'; Ramien 50'; Talakai 74'; Goals: Atkinson 4/4 24', 37', 51', 75'; Field goals: Atkinson 73'	Stadium: AAMI Park; Attendance: 18,670; Referee: Grant Atkins

Round 11: 18 May 2024	Cronulla-Sutherland Sharks	38–30	Sydney Roosters	Brisbane
17:30 AEST	Tries: Kennedy 0'; Katoa 18'; Wilton 30'; Talakai 43'; Mulitalo 65'; Hazelton 77'; Goals: Hynes 7/7 2', 20', 31', 44', 59 pen', 66', 78'	[Report Report]	Tries: Young 6', 70'; Tupou 25'; Pauga 34', 39'; Goals: Walker 5/6 8', 10 pen', 35', 40', 72'; Sin bin: Sua'ali'i (yellow card) 14' to 24'	Stadium: Suncorp Stadium; Attendance: 48,934; Referee: Adam Gee

Round 12: 25 May 2024	Cronulla-Sutherland Sharks	0–42	Penrith Panthers	Cronulla
17:30 AEST		[Report Report]	Tries: Fisher-Harris 4'; Luai 8'; Alamoti 25'; Edwards 31'; Cole 38'; Henry 46'; Sorensen 64'; Goals: Edwards 7/8 5', 9', 27', 39', 47', 66', 70 pen' Sin bin: Leota (yellow card) 79' to 80'	Stadium: PointsBet Stadium; Attendance: 13,500; Referee: Gerard Sutton

Round 13: 30 May 2024	Parramatta Eels	34–22	Cronulla-Sutherland Sharks	Parramatta
20:00 AEST	Tries: Penisini 10'; Sivo 14', 23'; Paulo 47'; Simonsson 57'; Brown 68'; Goals: Moses 5/7 15', 24', 49', 54 pen', 70'	[Report Report]	Tries: Katoa 4', 65'; Kennedy 33'; Atkinson 61'; Goals: Trindall 3/4 35', 62', 66'	Stadium: CommBank Stadium; Attendance: 11,665; Referee: Ashley Klein

Round 14: 8 June 2024	Brisbane Broncos	12–22	Cronulla-Sutherland Sharks	Brisbane
19:35 AEST	Tries: Carrigan 11'; Smoothy 32'; Goals: Staggs 2/2 13', 34'	[Report Report]	Tries: Talakai 16'; Katoa 42'; Trindall 47'; Brailey 49'; Goals: Trindall 3/5 44', 48', 51'	Stadium: Suncorp Stadium; Attendance: 41,004; Referee: Grant Atkins

Round 15: 13 June 2024	Cronulla-Sutherland Sharks	28–30	Dolphins	Cronulla
19:50 AEST	Tries: Hunt 28'; Nikora 34'; Mulitalo 45'; Kennedy 52'; Katoa 79'; Goals: Hynes 4/5 29', 35', 47', 53'	[Report Report]	Tries: Plath 10'; Farnworth 13'; Bostock 20'; Averillo 24'; Tabuai-Fidow 58'; Goals: Isaako 5/7 11', 15', 25', 59', 71 pen'	Stadium: PointsBet Stadium; Attendance: 8,035; Referee: Todd Smith

Round 16 (Bye for Cronulla-Sutherland Sharks)

Round 17: 28 June 2024	Canterbury-Bankstown Bulldogs	15–14 (g.p.)	Cronulla-Sutherland Sharks	Sydney Olympic Park
20:00 AEST	Tries: Kikau 2'; Mahoney 13'; Goals: Burton 3/3 4', 14', 76 pen' Field goals: Burton 83'	[Report Report]	Tries: Nikora 21'; Katoa 52'; Trindall 61'; Goals: Hynes 1/3 22'	Stadium: Accor Stadium; Attendance: 15,765; Referee: Gerard Sutton

Round 18: 5 July 2024	Cronulla-Sutherland Sharks	16–20	Gold Coast Titans	Coffs Harbour
18:00 AEST	Tries: Trindall 47'; Atkinson 60'; Hynes 74'; Goals: Hynes 2/3 61', 75'; Sin bin: Talakai (yellow card) 10' to 20'	[Report Report]	Tries: K. Foran 6'; Randall 13'; Palasia 51'; Goals: Boyd 4/4 7', 14', 44 pen', 53'	Stadium: C.ex Coffs International Stadium; Attendance: 8,673; Referee: Ziggy Przeklasa-Adamski

Round 19: 12 July 2024	Cronulla-Sutherland Sharks	58–6	Wests Tigers	Cronulla
20:00 AEST	Tries: Iro 2'; Mulitalo 13', 47', 58'; Katoa 24', 37'; Hamlin-Uele 54'; Nikora 62'; Ramien 76'; Trindall 78'; Goals: Trindall 9/10 3', 15', 25', 38', 55', 60', 63', 76', 79'	[Report Report]	Tries: Faataape 9'; Goals: Koroisau 1/1 10'; Sin bin: Koroisau (yellow card) 17' to 27'	Stadium: PointsBet Stadium; Attendance: 10,912; Referee: Adam Gee

Round 20 (Bye for Cronulla-Sutherland Sharks)

Round 21: 27 July 2024	North Queensland Cowboys	30–22	Cronulla-Sutherland Sharks	Townsville
17:30 AEST	Tries: Taulagi 5'; Nanai 14'; Feldt 36', 63', 75'; Goals: Holmes 5/6 16', 28 pen', 37', 65', 76'	[Report Report]	Tries: Mulitalo 10'; Iro 32'; Trindall 54'; Atkinson 78'; Goals: Trindall 3/4 33', 56', 78'; Sin bin: Brailey (yellow card) 27' to 37'	Stadium: Queensland Country Bank Stadium; Attendance: 17,907; Referee: Adam Gee

Round 22: 3 August 2024	Cronulla-Sutherland Sharks	20–6	South Sydney Rabbitohs	Cronulla
19:35 AEST	Tries: Katoa 13'; Stonestreet 47'; Trindall 58'; Iro 65'; Goals: Trindall 1/3 60'; Atkinson 1/1 66'	[Report Report]	Tries: Gray 6'; Goals: Myers 1/2 29 pen'	Stadium: PointsBet Stadium; Attendance: 12,763; Referee: Liam Kennedy

Round 23: 9 August 2024	Gold Coast Titans	0–44	Cronulla-Sutherland Sharks	Gold Coast
18:00 AEST	Sin bin: Fotuaika (yellow card) 16' to 26'	[Report Report]	Tries: Rudolf 4'; Stonestreet 14', 45'; Ramien 17'; Hazelton 24'; Talakai 27'; Nikora 59'; Williams 67'; Goals: Atkinson 6/8 5', 15', 19', 26', 28', 61'; Sin bin: Ramien (yellow card) 70' to 80'	Stadium: Cbus Super Stadium; Attendance: 13,287; Referee: Adam Gee

Round 24: 18 August 2024	Cronulla-Sutherland Sharks	19–18 (g.p.)	Newcastle Knights	Cronulla
16:05 AEST	Tries: Atkinson 2'; Nikora 7'; Mulitalo 72'; Goals: Atkinson 3/5 4', 63 pen', 74'; Field goals: Atkinson 84'	[Report Report]	Tries: Pearce-Paul 20'; Marzhew 30'; Gagai 49'; Goals: Ponga 3/4 21', 31', 45 pen' Sin bin: Crossland (yellow card) 40' to 50'	Stadium: PointsBet Stadium; Attendance: 11,503; Referee: Gerard Sutton

Round 25: 25 August 2024	St. George Illawarra Dragons	10–38	Cronulla-Sutherland Sharks	Wollongong
16:05 AEST	Tries: Bird 22'; Tuipulotu 54'; Goals: Lomax 1/2 24'	[Report Report]	Tries: Ramien 6'; Iro 27'; Stonestreet 33', 67'; Kennedy 57'; Nikora 61'; Hiroti 77'; Goals: Trindall 5/7 28', 58', 62', 68', 78'; Sin bin: Ramien (yellow card) 16' to 26'	Stadium: WIN Stadium; Attendance: 17,754; Referee: Ashley Klein

Round 26: 31 August 2024	Cronulla-Sutherland Sharks	28–30	New Zealand Warriors	Cronulla
19:35 AEST	Tries: Wilton 24'; Iro 32'; Stonestreet 34', 68'; Hazelton 37'; Goals: Trindall 4/5 25', 35', 39', 70'; Sin bin: Iro (yellow card) 60' to 70'	[Report Report]	Tries: Metcalf 11'; Watene-Zelezniak 48', 53', 79'; Nicoll-Klokstad 61'; Montoya 64'; Goals: Johnson 3/6 50', 63', 65'	Stadium: PointsBet Stadium; Attendance: 12,637; Referee: Chris Butler

Round 27: 8 September 2024	Manly Warringah Sea Eagles	20–40	Cronulla-Sutherland Sharks	Brookvale
14:00 AEST	Tries: Talau 11'; Faulalo 16'; Olakau'atu 57'; Koula 76'; Goals: Garrick 2/4 58', 77'	[Report Report]	Tries: Katoa 4'; Mulitalo 22', 48'; Williams 37'; Atkinson 54'; Nikora 65', 70'; Goals: Hynes 6/7 23', 39', 49', 55', 66', 71'	Stadium: 4 Pines Park; Attendance: 17,384; Referee: Adam Gee

== Finals series ==
=== Bracket ===
Qualifying and elimination finals
14 September – Melbourne
1	Melbourne	37
4	Cronulla-Sutherland	10
14 September – Townsville
5	North Queensland	28
8	Newcastle	16
15 September – Sydney
6	Canterbury-Bankstown	22
7	Manly Warringah	24
13 September – Sydney
2	Penrith	30
3	Sydney	10

Semi-finals
20 September – Sydney
Cronulla-Sutherland	26
North Queensland	18
21 September – Sydney
Sydney	40
Manly Warringah	16

Preliminary finals
27 September – Melbourne
Melbourne	48
Sydney	18
28 September – Sydney
Penrith	26
Cronulla-Sutherland	6

Grand final
6 October – Sydney
Melbourne	6
Penrith	14

=== Matches ===
Win Draw Loss Fixtures

QEF: 14 September 2024	Melbourne Storm	37–10	Cronulla-Sutherland Sharks	Melbourne
16:05 AEST	Tries: Munster 1'; Warbrick 24', 62'; Grant 51', 71', 77'; Goals: Meaney 6/8 2', 26', 29 pen', 53', 72', 76 pen' Field goals: Papenhuyzen 79'	[Report Report]	Tries: Katoa 12'; Nikora 39'; Goals: Hynes 1/2 40'	Stadium: AAMI Park; Attendance: 26,326; Referee: Gerard Sutton

SF: 20 September 2024	Cronulla-Sutherland Sharks	26–18	North Queensland Cowboys	Moore Park
19:50 AEST	Tries: Trindall 13', 31'; McInnes 15'; Mulitalo 38'; Goals: Hynes 5/5 14', 16', 32', 39', 65 pen'	[Report Report]	Tries: Holmes 41', 69'; Cotter 54'; Goals: Holmes 2/2 43', 55'; Drinkwater 1/1 69'	Stadium: Allianz Stadium; Attendance: 19,124; Referee: Ashley Klein

PF: 28 September 2024	Penrith Panthers	26–6	Cronulla-Sutherland Sharks	Sydney Olympic Park
19:50 AEST	Tries: Alamoti 22', 65'; To'o 62'; Martin 76'; Goals: Cleary 4/5 6 pen', 23', 35 pen', 66'; Alamoti 1/1 77'	[Report Report]	Tries: Katoa 59'; Goals: Hynes 1/2 17 pen'	Stadium: Accor Stadium; Attendance: 33,753; Referee: Ashley Klein

== Player Appearances ==
FB=Fullback	W=Winger	C=Centre	FE=Five-Eighth	HB=Halfback	PR=Prop	H=Hooker	SR=Second Row	L=Lock	B=Bench	R=Reserve

No	Player	1	2	3	4	5	6	7	8	9	10	11	12	13	14	15	16	17	18	19	20	21	22	23	24	25	26	27	F1	F2	F3
1	Daniel Atkinson	FE (NSW)	FE (NSW)	FE (NSW)	B	–	–	FE (NSW)	FE	FE	FE	FE	FE	FE	FE	FE (NSW)	HB (NSW)	FB (NSW)	W	FE	–	FE	FE	FE	FE	FE	C	B	B	–	B
2	Jayden Berrell	H (NSW)	H (NSW)	H (NSW)	–	–	H (NSW)	–	H (NSW)	–	–	–	–	H (NSW)	H (NSW)	H (NSW)	H (NSW)	H (NSW)	–	H (NSW)	H (NSW)	B	FE (NSW)	B	B	–	H (NSW)	H (NSW)	H (NSW)	H (NSW)	H (NSW)
3	Blayke Brailey	H	H	H	H	–	H	H	H	H	HB	H	H	H	H	H	–	H	H	H	–	H	H	HB	HB	H	H	H	H	H	H
4	Billy Burns	SR (NSW)	SR (NSW)	B	B	–	SR (NSW)	SR (NSW)	SR (NSW)	SR (NSW)	SR (NSW)	SR (NSW)	SR (NSW)	SR (NSW)	–	SR (NSW)	SR (NSW)	SR (NSW)	–	SR (NSW)	SR (NSW)	SR (NSW)	SR (NSW)	B	B	–	SR (NSW)	SR (NSW)	SR (NSW)	SR (NSW)	SR (NSW)
5	Jesse Colquhoun													B (NSW)	PR (NSW)	B (NSW)	PR (NSW)	B (NSW)	L (NSW)	B											
6	Kade Dykes				FE (NSW)	–	FB (NSW)	FB (NSW)	FB (NSW)	FB (NSW)	FB (NSW)	–	–	–	–	–	–														
7	Dale Finucane	B	B	B					On 23 April, Finucane announced his immediate retirement from the NRL on medical grounds.																						
8	Michael Gabrael	C (JFC)	C (JFC)	C (JFC)	–	–	C (JFC)	C (JFC)	C (JFC)	C (JFC)	C (JFC)	–	–	–	–	–	–	C (JFC)	C (JFC)	C (JFC)	C (JFC)	–	C (JFC)	–	–	C (JFC)	–	C (JFC)	C (JFC)	C (JFC)	C (JFC)
9	Braden Hamlin-Uele						PR (NSW)	B	B	B	B	–	–	B	–	B	PR (NSW)	PR (NSW)	PR (NSW)	B	PR (NSW)	B	B	–	B	B	B	PR (NSW)	PR (NSW)	PR (NSW)	PR (NSW)
10	Tuku Hau Tapuha	PR (NSW)	B	–	B	–	B	PR (NSW)	B	PR (NSW)	B	B	B	PR (NSW)	B	PR (NSW)	–	PR (NSW)	B	PR (NSW)	PR (NSW)	–	–	PR (NSW)	B	PR (NSW)	PR (NSW)	PR (NSW)	PR (NSW)	PR (NSW)	PR (NSW)
11	Tom Hazelton	B	B	B	PR	–	PR	PR	PR	PR	PR	PR	PR	PR	B	B	–	B	B	B	–	PR		B		B	B	B	B	B	B
12	Royce Hunt	PR	–	B				PR (NSW)	PR (NSW)	PR (NSW)	B	B	B	B	B	B	–	B	PR	PR	–	PR (NSW)	PR	B	SR	B	B	PR	B	B	B
13	Nicho Hynes	HB	HB	HB	HB	–	HB	HB	HB	HB		HB	HB		–	HB	–	HB	HB								FE	HB	HB	HB	HB
14	Kayal Iro	–	–	C (NSW)	C	–	C	C	C	C	C	C	C	C	C	C	–	C	C	C	–	C	C	C		C	C	C	C	C	C
15	Sione Katoa	W	W	W	W	–	W	Red card	W	W	W	W	W	W	W	W	–	W		W	–	W	W	W	W		W	W	W	W	W
16	Oregon Kaufusi	PR	PR	PR	PR	–	PR	PR	PR	PR	PR	PR	PR	PR	PR	PR	–	PR	PR	PR	–	PR	PR	PR	PR	PR	PR	–	PR	PR	PR
17	William Kennedy	FB	FB	FB	FB	–	FB	FB	FB	FB	FB	FB	FB	FB	FB	FB	–	FB	FB	FB	–	Red card	FB	FB	FB	FB	FB	FB	FB	FB	FB
18	Cameron McInnes	L	L	L	L	–	L	L	L	L	H	L	L		L	L	–	L	L	L	–	L	L	H	H	L	L	L	L	L	L
19	Ronaldo Mulitalo	W	W	W	W	–	W	W	W	W	W	W	W	W	W	W	–	W	W	W	–	W			W			W	W	W	W
20	Briton Nikora	SR	SR	Red card	Red card	–	SR	SR	SR	SR	SR	SR	SR	SR	SR	SR	–	SR	SR	SR	–	SR	SR	SR	SR	SR	SR	SR	SR	SR	SR
21	Jesse Ramien	C	C	C	C	–	C	C	C	C	C	C	C	C	C	C	–	C	C	C	–	C	C	C	C	C	Red card	C		C	
22	Toby Rudolf	B	PR	PR			B	B		B				B	PR	PR	–	PR	PR (NSW)	B	–	B	B	PR	PR	PR	PR	PR	PR	PR	PR
23	Sam Stonestreet	W (NSW)	W (NSW)	W (NSW)	W (NSW)	–	W (NSW)	W	W (NSW)	W (NSW)	W (NSW)	W (NSW)	W (NSW)	W (NSW)	W (NSW)	W (NSW)	W (NSW)	W (NSW)			–	–	W	W	–	W	W	W (NSW)	W (NSW)	W (NSW)	W (NSW)
24	Siosifa Talakai	C	C	C	SR	–	B	B	B	B	B	B	B	B	SR	SR	–	SR	SR	Red card	–	B	B	SR	C	–	–	B	C	B	C
25	Siteni Taukamo	C (JFC)	C (JFC)	C (JFC)	FE (JFC)	–	C (JFC)	C (JFC)	C (JFC)	C (JFC)	W (JFC)	–	FB (JFC)	FB (JFC)	FB (JFC)	C (JFC)	C (JFC)	FB (JFC)	W (NSW)	W (NSW)	W (NSW)	FE (NSW)	W (NSW)	C (JFC)	C (JFC)	W (NSW)	W (NSW)	FB (JFC)	FB (JFC)	FB (JFC)	FB (JFC)
26	Niwhai Puru	HB (NSW)	HB (NSW)	HB (NSW)	HB (NSW)	–	HB (NSW)	HB (NSW)	HB (NSW)	HB (NSW)	HB (NSW)	HB (NSW)	HB (NSW)	HB (NSW)	HB (NSW)	HB (NSW)	–	HB (NSW)	HB (NSW)	HB (NSW)	HB (NSW)	HB (NSW)	HB (NSW)	HB (NSW)	–	HB (NSW)	HB (NSW)	HB (NSW)	HB (NSW)	HB (NSW)	HB (NSW)
27	Braydon Trindall	FE	FE	FE	FE	–	FE	FE	-	-	-	-	-	HB	HB	FE	–	FE	FE	HB	–	HB	HB	–	–	HB	HB	FE	FE	FE	FE
28	Jack Williams	B	B	SR	B	–	B	B	B	B	L	B	B	L	B	B	–	B	B				B	L	L	B	B	B	B	B	B
29	Teig Wilton	SR	SR	SR	SR	–	SR	SR	SR	SR	SR	SR	SR	SR				B	B	SR	–	SR	SR			SR	SR	SR	SR	SR	SR
Development Players
29	Max Bradbury	PR (JFC)	B (NSW)	PR (NSW)	PR (NSW)	–	PR (JFC)	PR (JFC)	–	PR (JFC)	PR (NSW)	PR (NSW)	PR (NSW)																		
30	Dylan Coutts	SR (JFC)	SR (JFC)	SR (JFC)	SR (JFC)	–	SR (JFC)	SR (JFC)	SR (JFC)	SR (JFC)	SR (JFC)	–	SR (JFC)	SR (JFC)	SR (JFC)	SR (JFC)	SR (JFC)	SR (JFC)	SR (JFC)	SR (JFC)	SR (JFC)	–	L (JFC)	SR (JFC)	SR (JFC)	SR (JFC)	SR (JFC)	SR (JFC)	SR (JFC)	SR (JFC)	SR (JFC)
31	Mawene Hiroti	FB (NSW)	–	–	–	–	FE (NSW)	W (NSW)	FE (NSW)	C (NSW)	C (NSW)	C (NSW)	–	C (NSW)	–	C (NSW)	C (NSW)	C (NSW)						C (NSW)	–	W	–	–	–	C (NSW)	C (NSW)
32	Liam Ison	FB (JFC)	FB (JFC)	FB (NSW)	FB (NSW)	–	FB (JFC)	FB (JFC)	FB (JFC)	FB (JFC)	FB (JFC)	FB (NSW)	FB (NSW)	FB (NSW)	FB (NSW)	FB (NSW)	FB (NSW)	–	FB (NSW)	FB (NSW)	–	FB	FB (NSW)	FB (NSW)	–	–	FB (NSW)	FB (NSW)	FB (NSW)	FB (NSW)	FB (NSW)

== Representative Honours ==
Player	All Stars match
Michael Gabrael	New South Wales U19 Origin
Nicho Hynes	Indigenous All Stars
Nicho Hynes	New South Wales Origin Game 1
Cameron McInnes	New South Wales Origin Game 1
Briton Nikora	(Māori people) Maori All Stars
Braydon Trindall	Indigenous All Stars
Sione Katoa	Tonga

== Awards ==
=== Sharks Awards Night ===
Were presented on Thursday 3 October 2024 at Doltone House Sylvania.

- Porter Gallen Medal and Pontifex Player of the Year: Blayke Brailey
- NRLW Player of the Year: Tiana Penitani
- Tommy Bishop Players Player: Jesse Ramien
- NRLW Player's Player: Quincy Dodd and Brooke Anderson
- Steve Rogers Rookie of the Year: Kayal Iro
- NRLW Rookie of the Year: Georgia Hannaway
- Members Player of the Year: Daniel Atkinson and Tiana Penitani
- Sharks Have Heart Community Award: Nicho Hynes, Max Bradbury and Emma Tonegato
- Iron Man: Blayke Brailey
- Andrew Ettingshausen Club Person of the Year: Tony Grimaldi
- Education Excellence: Jesse Colquhoun, Samuel McCulloch and Tiana Penitani
- Jersey Flegg - Gavin Miller Player of the Year: Samuel McCulloch
- Jersey Flegg - Greg Pierce Players Player: Felix Faatili

=== Women's Awards Night ===
Were held on Wednesday 15 May at Sharks at Kareela.

- Female Pathways Player of the Year: Felila Fakalelu
- Tarsha Gale Coaches Award: Joy Levy
- Tarsha Gale Player's Player of the Year: Koreti Leilua and Tia-Jordyn Vasilovski
- Tarsha Gale Player of the Year: Stephanie Faulkner
- Lisa Fiaola Coaches Award: Charlotte Hall
- Lisa Fiaola Players' Player: Felila Fakalelu
- Lisa Fiaola Player of the Year: Felila Fakalelu

=== Junior Rep Awards Night ===
Were presented on Tuesday 14th May.

- Junior Rep Player of the Year: Thomas Dellow
- Harold Matthews Cup Player of the Year: Thomas Dellow
- Harold Matthews Cup Coaches Award: Thomas Dellow
- Harold Matthews Cup Players' Player: Thomas Dellow
- SG Ball Player of the Year: Jai Davies
- SG Ball Coaches Award: Pharrell Gray
- SG Ball Players' Player: Max McCarthy

=== Other awards ===
- Preston Campbell Medal: Braydon Trindall
- Ken Stephen Medal: Nicho Hynes
- NRLW Captain of the Year: Tiana Penitani
