= Stonestreet =

Stonestreet may refer to:

== People ==
- Charles H. Stonestreet (1813–1885), American Roman Catholic priest
- Eric Stonestreet (born 1971), American actor
- George Stonestreet (1915–1993), Australian rugby league footballer
- Jess Stonestreet Jackson, Jr. (1930–2011), American wine entrepreneur and horsebreeder
- Lisa Gluskin Stonestreet (born 1968), American poet
- Ken Stonestreet (1942–2015), Australian rugby league footballer
- Skyler Stonestreet, American musician and singer-songwriter

== Other ==
- Stonestreet One, American software company
- Stonestreet: Who Killed the Centerfold Model?, American television movie
- Stonestreets Coaches, Australian bus company

== See also ==
- Stone Street (disambiguation)
