= Ronaldo Mulitalo =

NZ, US & Samoa international rugby league footballer

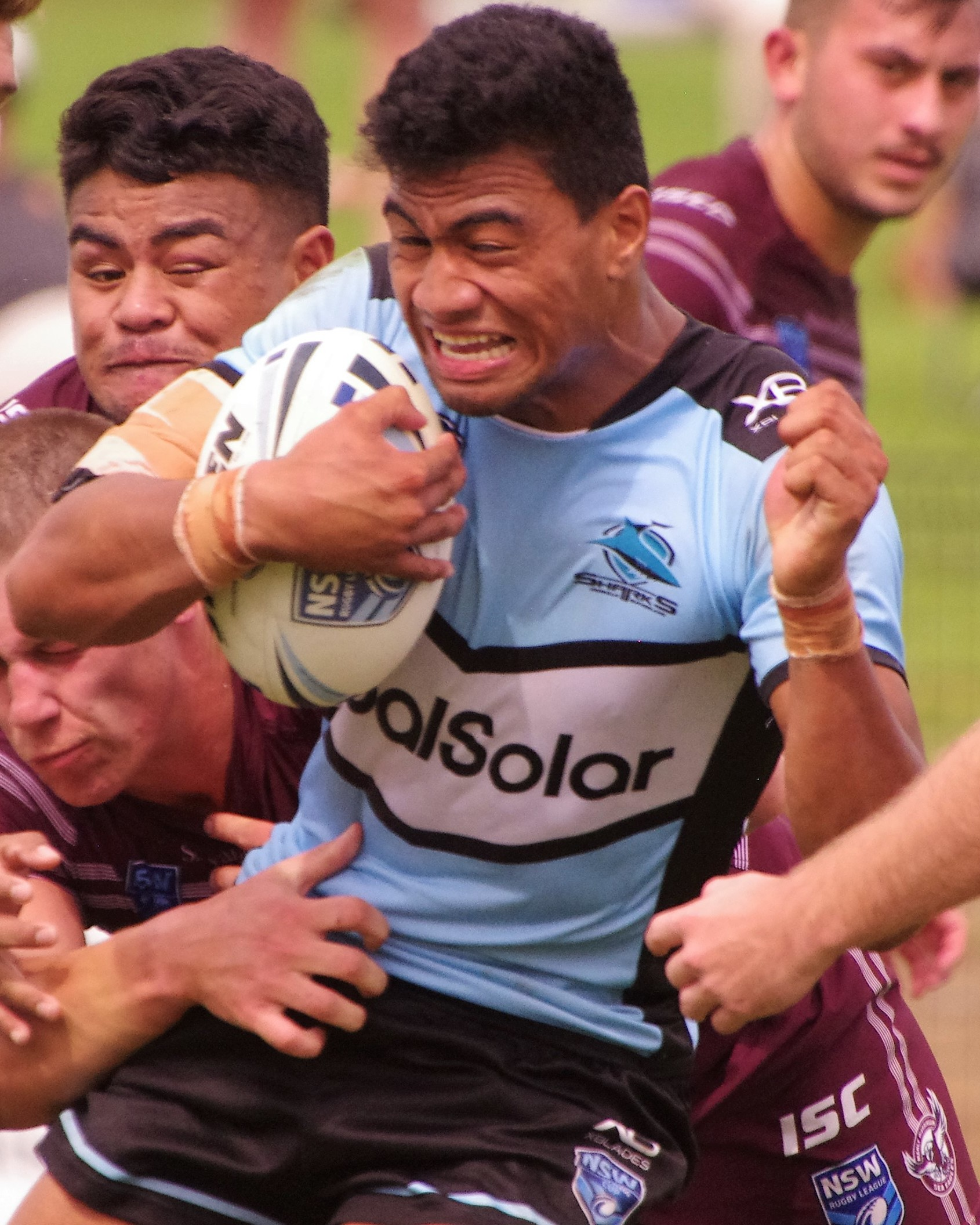

Personal information
- Born: 17 November 1999 (age 26) Auckland, New Zealand
- Height: 190 cm (6 ft 3 in)
- Weight: 95 kg (14 st 13 lb)

Playing information
- Position: Wing
Club
Years	Team	Pld	T	G	FG	P
2019–	Cronulla Sharks	153	113	0	0	452
Representative
Years	Team	Pld	T	G	FG	P
2019	United States 9s	3	0	0	0	0
2019	Samoa	1	1	0	0	4
2022–	New Zealand	13	10	0	0	40
- Source: As of 15 November 2026
- Education: Marcellin College, Auckland
- Relatives: Lorenzo Mulitalo (brother)

Ronaldo Mulitalo (born 17 November 1999) is a professional rugby league footballer who plays as a winger for the Cronulla-Sutherland Sharks in the National Rugby League (NRL). He has played for the United States, Samoa and New Zealand at an international level.

== Background ==
Mulitalo was born in South Auckland, New Zealand, and is of Samoan descent. His mother's family is from American Samoa.

He played his junior rugby league for the Ellerslie Eagles and attended Marcellin College, Auckland before moving to Ipswich, Queensland in October 2013. While in Ipswich, he attended Ipswich State High School and played for the Springfield Panthers.

== Playing career ==
=== Early career ===
In 2015, Mulitalo played for the Ipswich Jets Cyril Connell Cup side and moved up to their Mal Meninga Cup side in 2016. In 2017, he signed with Cronulla, playing for the SG Ball Cup side which made it to the Grand Final. Later that year, he represented Queensland under-18. In 2018, Mulitalo moved up to the Sharks' Jersey Flegg Cup side.

=== 2019 ===
Mulitalo started the 2019 season playing for Cronulla's Canterbury Cup NSW feeder side, Newtown.

On 26 April, after starting 2019 as a development player, Mulitalo signed a contract extension and was immediately elevated into Cronulla's top 30 squad. A day later, he made his NRL debut against the Brisbane Broncos as a late replacement for Josh Dugan, who was injured during the warm-up. In July, he played fullback for the Queensland under-20 side, scoring a try in their loss to New South Wales. In Round 19 against North Queensland, Mulitalo scored his first try in the top grade as Cronulla won the match 16-14 at Shark Park. In Round 24 against Canberra, Mulitalo scored 2 tries as Cronulla lost the match 15-14 in Golden Point extra-time at Shark Park.

In round 25 against the Wests Tigers, Mulitalo was placed on report and later suspended for one match after using an illegal shoulder charge on Wests player Luke Brooks.

Mulitalo played for Cronulla's feeder side Newtown in their Canterbury Cup NSW grand final victory over the Wentworthville Magpies at Bankwest Stadium, scoring a try in a 20-15 win. The following week, Mulitalo played for Newtown in the NRL State Championship victory over the Burleigh Bears at ANZ Stadium.

At the end of the 2019 season, Mulitalo was selected in the United States national rugby league team for the 2019 Rugby League World Cup 9s. He qualifies through his American Samoan heritage.

=== 2020 ===
In round 4 of the 2020 NRL season, Mulitalo scored two tries as Cronulla-Sutherland won their first game of the year defeating North Queensland 26-16 at Queensland Country Bank Stadium.

In round 18, he scored two tries in Cronulla's 22-14 victory over the New Zealand Warriors at Kogarah Oval. The second try he scored turned out to be the winner which saw Cronulla finish in the top 8 and qualify for the finals at New Zealand's expense.

=== 2021 ===
In round 12 of the 2021 NRL season, he scored two tries in Cronulla-Sutherland's 38-10 victory over the Gold Coast.

Mulitalo was named to make his State of Origin debut for Queensland in game 2 as a late replacement for Reece Walsh, however, Mulitalo was found to be ineligible for Queensland as he did not reside in the state prior to his 13th birthday, controversially, Mulitalo had previously been selected for and represented QRL Queensland age grade sides.

In round 23, Mulitalo scored two tries for Cronulla in a 50-20 victory over the Wests Tigers. In the second half of the match, Mulitalo was taken from the field with a suspected broken jaw. He played 16 games for Cronulla and scored 10 tries in the 2021 NRL season which saw the club narrowly miss the finals by finishing 9th on the table.

=== 2022 ===
In round 6 of the 2022 NRL season, Mulitalo scored two tries for Cronulla in a 34-18 loss against Melbourne. The following week, he scored another two tries in Cronulla's 34–22 victory over Manly. In round 14, Mulitalo scored two tries for Cronulla in a 38-16 victory over the New Zealand Warriors. Mulitalo played a total of 24 games for Cronulla in throughout the season scoring 17 tries to become the club's top try scorer for the year. Mulitalo played in both finals matches as they were eliminated in straight sets.

=== 2023 ===
In round 4 of the 2023 NRL season, Mulitalo scored two tries for Cronulla in their 40-8 victory over rivals St. George Illawarra. The following week, he scored a further two tries in the club's 32-30 loss against the New Zealand Warriors. At one stage, Cronulla had led the match 26-6. In round 9, Mulitalo scored two tries for Cronulla in a 44-6 victory over North Queensland. In round 18, Mulitalo scored two tries for Cronulla in their 52-16 victory over rivals St. George Illawarra. In round 24, Mulitalo scored a further two tries in Cronulla's 36-6 victory over the Gold Coast. Mulitalo played a total of 23 games for Cronulla in the 2023 NRL season and scored 21 tries as the club finished sixth on the table. Mulitalo played in the clubs 13-12 upset loss against the Sydney Roosters which ended their season.

=== 2024 ===
In round 4 of the 2024 NRL season, Mulitalo scored two tries for Cronulla in their 36-22 victory over Canberra. In round 6 of the 2024 NRL season, Mulitalo scored two tries for Cronulla in their 34-22 victory over South Sydney. In round 19, Mulitalo scored a hat-trick in Cronulla's 58-6 win over the Wests Tigers. In round 27, Mulitalo scored two tries for Cronulla in their 40-20 victory over Manly in the "Battle of the Beaches" game. Mulitalo played 23 games for Cronulla in the 2024 NRL season and scored 18 tries as the club finished 4th on the table and qualified for the finals. He played in all three of Cronulla's finals matches including their preliminary final loss against Penrith.

=== 2025 ===
On 11 February, Cronulla-Sutherland announced that Mulitalo had re-signed with the club until the end of 2028. Mulitalo played 26 matches for Cronulla in the 2025 NRL season as the club finished 5th on the table. The club reached the preliminary final for a second consecutive season but lost against Melbourne 22-14. On 23 October, the Sharks announced Mulitalo had suffered a ACL injury while playing for New Zealand in the Pacific Championships.

=== 2026 ===
After an ACL injury from late 2025, Mulitalo made a seven-month recovery and returned in Round 11 of the 2026 NRL season. Across 17 appearances, Mulitalo scored 13 tries, 3 try assists and 17 line breaks. Mulitalo scored two tries in his return during the Sharks' 38–16 Magic Round victory over the Canterbury-Bankstown Bulldogs in Round 11. In total, he made 2,485 total running metres (averaging 146 metres per game) and contributed to 45 tackle breaks Mulitalo played 17 matches for Cronulla in the 2026 NRL season as the club finished 5th on the table and qualified for the finals. Mulitalo played in both finals games for Cronulla as they were knocked out at the semi-final stage by the Sydney Roosters. In a post match interview Mulitalo said "We saved our worst for last. We're disappointed we let ourselves down and let our fans down. We've got a few guys leaving and it's shithouse this is their last memory".

== Statistics ==
=== NRL ===
Season	Team	Matches	T	G	GK %	F/G	Pts
2019	Cronulla-Sutherland	8	5	0	—	0	20
2020	Cronulla-Sutherland	16	12	0	—	0	48
2021	Cronulla-Sutherland	16	10	0	—	0	40
2022	Cronulla-Sutherland	24	17	0	—	0	68
2023	Cronulla-Sutherland	23	21	0	—	0	84
2024	Cronulla-Sutherland	23	18	0	—	0	72
2025	Cronulla-Sutherland	26	17	0	—	0	68
2026	Cronulla-Sutherland	17	13				52
Career totals		153	113	0	—	0	452

=== International ===
Season	Team	Matches	T	G	GK %	F/G	Pts
2019	Samoa	1	1	0	—	0	4
2022	New Zealand	2	1	0	—	0	4
Career totals		3	2	0	—	0	8
