= Stone Street =

Stone Street may refer to:

== Places ==
USA

- Stone Street (Manhattan), New York, United States in the Financial District
- Stone Street Historic District (New Hamburg, New York), United States
- Stone Street (Kent), England, the Antonine Itinerary's fourth route

England

- Stone Street, Boxford, Suffolk, England a hamlet near Babergh
- Stone Street, Spexhall, Suffolk, a hamlet
- Stone Street, Seal, near Sevenoaks, a hamlet in west Kent

== Other ==
- Stone Street (horse) (born 1905), American Thoroughbred racehorse

== See also ==
- Stonestreet (disambiguation)
- Stane Street (disambiguation)
- Stanegate, a Roman road parallel to Hadrian's Wall on its south side between Corbridge and Carlisle
- Roman roads in Britain
