= Sione Katoa (rugby league, born 1997) =

Tonga international rugby league footballer

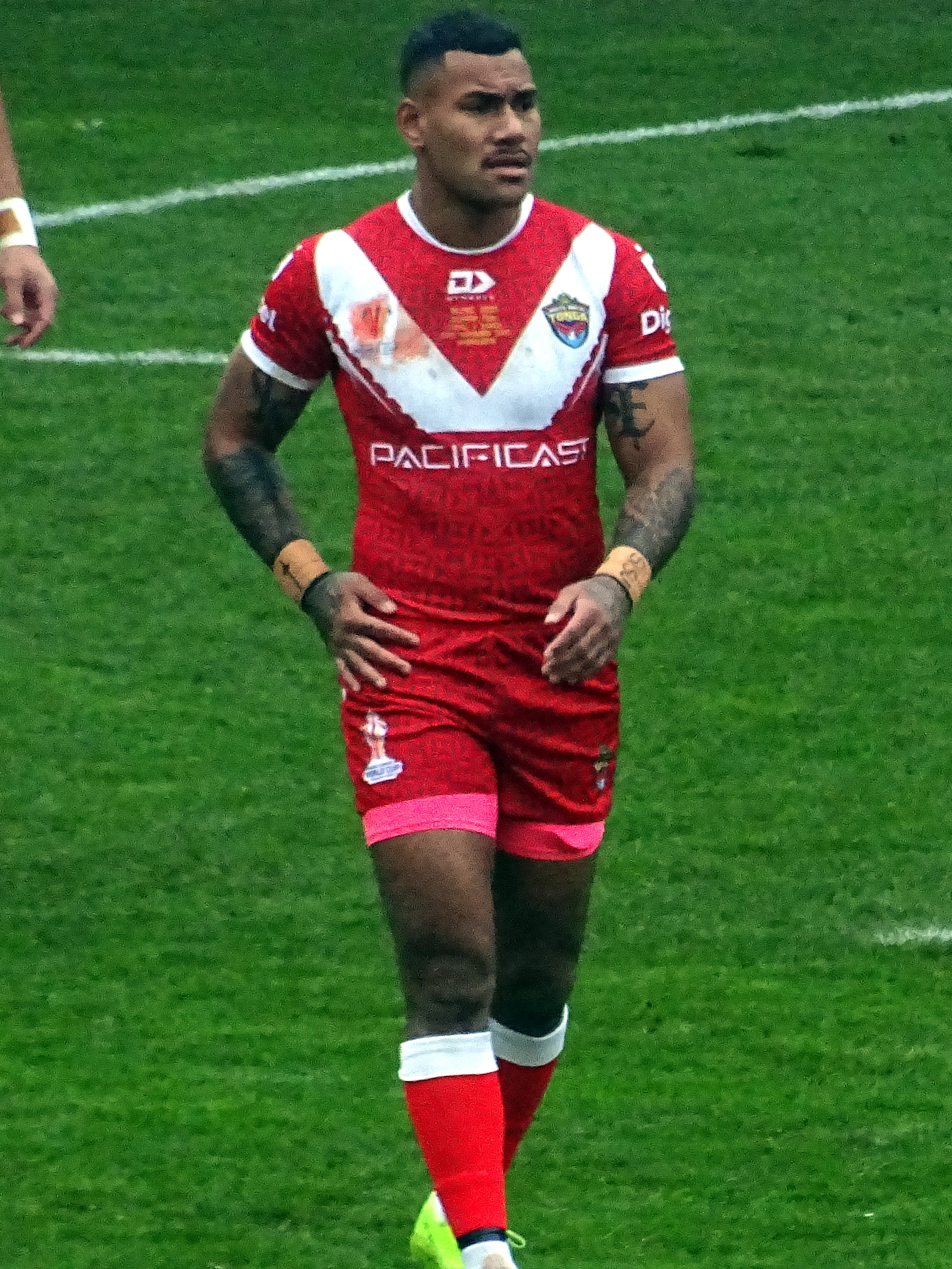

Personal information
- Born: 21 August 1997 (age 29) Hamilton, New Zealand
- Height: 180 cm (5 ft 11 in)
- Weight: 88 kg (13 st 12 lb)

Playing information
- Position: Wing
Club
Years	Team	Pld	T	G	FG	P
2018–26	Cronulla Sharks	148	102	1	0	410
2027–	North Qld Cowboys	0	0	0	0	0
	Total	148	102	1	0	410
Representative
Years	Team	Pld	T	G	FG	P
2019	Tonga 9s	3	1	1	0	6
2022–	Tonga	11	6	0	0	24
- Source: As of 16 November 2026
- Education: Barker College
- Relatives: Tui Katoa (brother)

Sione Katoa (born 21 August 1997) is a Tonga international rugby league footballer who plays on the wing for the North Queensland Cowboys in the NRL.

== Background ==
Katoa was born in Hamilton, New Zealand and is of Tongan descent. Katoa moved to Sydney, New South Wales, Australia in 2003 aged 6.

He played for the Junior Kiwis and his junior rugby league for the Chester Hill Hornets.

He was a student at Barker College where he played in the First XV rugby union team.

Katoa was part of the Parramatta Eels junior systems before being signed by the Cronulla-Sutherland Sharks.

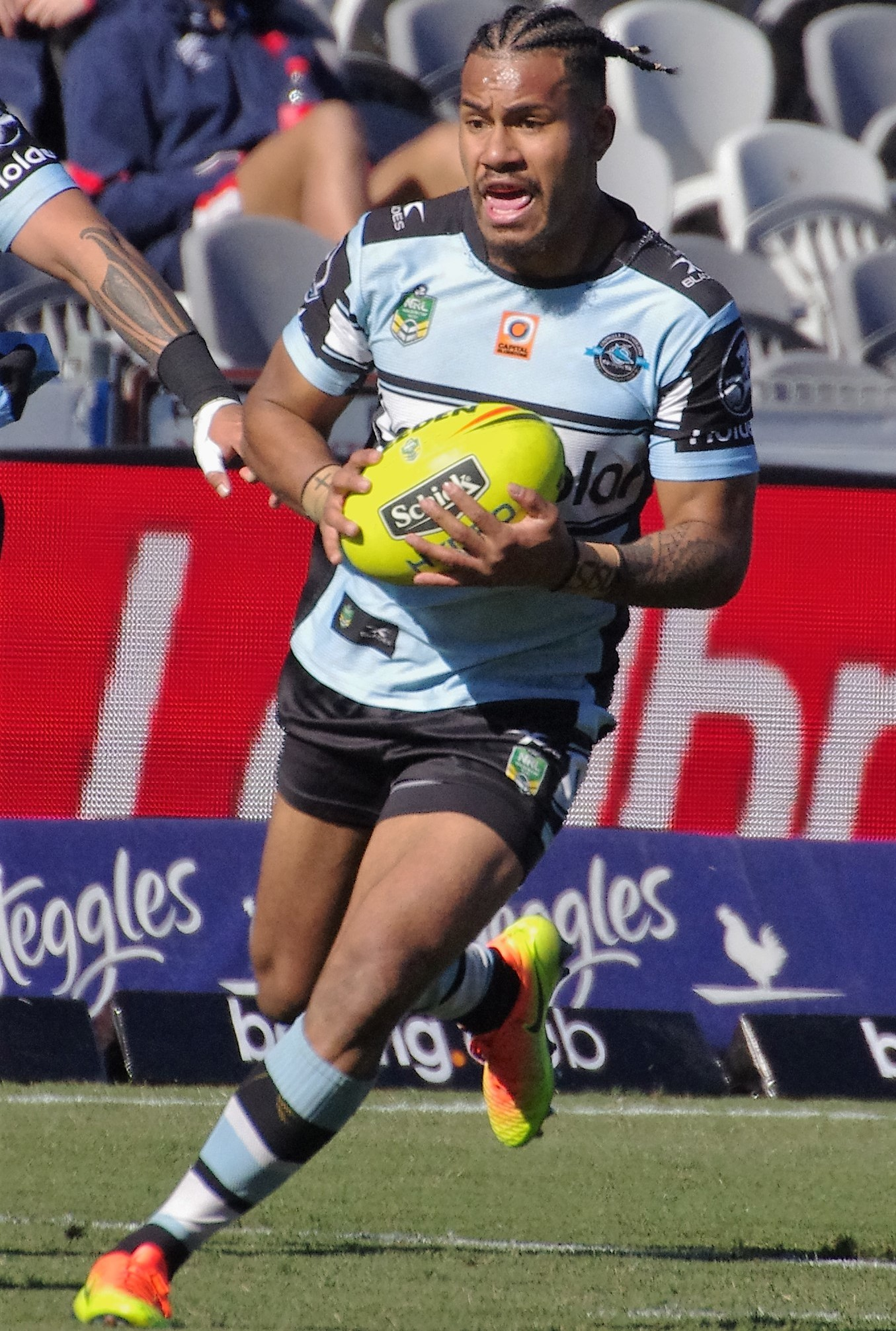
Katoa playing for the Cronulla Sharks in 2017

Katoa played for the Cronulla-Sutherland Sharks NYC team in 2016–2017, scoring 44 tries in 49 matches. On 4 September 2017, Katoa was named on the wing in the 2017 Holden Cup Team of the Year.

== Playing career ==
=== 2018 ===
After impressing in the pre-season trials for the Sharks, Katoa had beaten the likes of Edrick Lee and Aaron Gray to the vacant wing spot for Round 1. In Round 1 of the 2018 NRL season, Katoa made his NRL debut for the Cronulla-Sutherland Sharks against the North Queensland Cowboys, starting on the wing and had a solid performance before leaving the field with a suspected broken jaw in the second half as the Sharks were defeated 20–14 at 1300SMILES Stadium.

Katoa ended the season playing for Cronulla's feeder club side Newtown in the Intrust Super Premiership NSW. Katoa played on the wing for Newtown in their 2018 Intrust Super Premiership NSW grand final loss to Canterbury-Bankstown at Leichhardt Oval.

=== 2019 ===
Katoa made 7 appearances for Cronulla-Sutherland in the 2019 NRL season but mainly spent much of the year playing for the club's feeder side Newtown in the Canterbury Cup NSW. Katoa played for Newtown in their 2019 Canterbury Cup NSW grand final victory over the Wentworthville Magpies at the new Western Sydney Stadium. The following week, Katoa played for Newtown in the NRL State Championship victory over the Burleigh Bears at ANZ Stadium.

=== 2020 ===
In round 6 of the 2020 NRL season, Katoa scored a hat-trick as Cronulla defeated Canterbury 20–18 at Bankwest Stadium.

=== 2021 ===
In round 19 of the 2021 NRL season, he scored two tries for Cronulla in a 44–24 victory over Canterbury-Bankstown.

In round 23 against the Wests Tigers, Katoa scored two tries for Cronulla in a 50–20 victory. In round 25, Katoa scored two tries for Cronulla in a 26–18 loss against Melbourne. He played 13 games for Cronulla and scored nine tries in the 2021 NRL season which saw the club narrowly miss the finals by finishing 9th on the table.

=== 2022 ===
In round 14 of the 2022 NRL season, Katoa scored a hat-trick in Cronulla's 38–16 victory over the New Zealand Warriors. On 19 July, Katoa was ruled out for the rest of the 2022 NRL season with a pectoral injury.

=== 2023 ===
On 30 March, Katoa signed a three-year contract extension to remain at Cronulla until the end of 2026. In round 19 of the 2023 NRL season, Katoa scored a hat-trick in Cronulla's 36–12 victory over the bottom placed Wests Tigers. Katoa played a total of 25 games for Cronulla in the 2023 NRL season and scored 13 tries as Cronulla finished sixth on the table. Katoa played in the clubs 13-12 upset loss against the Sydney Roosters which ended their season.

=== 2024 ===
In round 8 of the 2024 NRL season, Katoa scored two tries for Cronulla in their 40-0 victory over Canberra. In round 13, Katoa scored two tries for Cronulla in their upset 34-22 loss against Parramatta. In round 19, he scored two tries for Cronulla in their 58-6 victory over the Wests Tigers. Katoa played 24 matches for Cronulla in the 2024 NRL season and scored 17 tries as the club finished 4th on the table and qualified for the finals. Katoa played in all three of Cronulla's finals matches including their preliminary final loss against Penrith.

=== 2025 ===
On 24 February, it was announced that Katoa would be ruled out indefinitely from playing after requiring shoulder surgery. In round 15, Katoa scored two tries for Cronulla in their 30-18 victory over rivals St. George Illawarra. Katoa played 15 games for Cronulla in the 2025 NRL season as the club finished 5th on the table. The club reached the preliminary final for a second consecutive season but lost against Melbourne 22-14.

=== 2026 ===
On 26 May 2026, North Queensland announced the signing on Katoa on a two-year deal. Katoa played 20 matches for Cronulla in the 2026 NRL season as the club finished 5th on the table and qualified for the finals. Katoa's final game for the club was their semi-final loss to eventual premiers the Sydney Roosters.

== Statistics ==
=== NRL ===
Statistics are correct as of the end of round 15 2025

Season	Team	Matches	T	G	GK %	F/G	Pts
2018	Cronulla-Sutherland Sharks	9	3	0	—	0	12
2019	Cronulla-Sutherland Sharks	7	4	0	—	0	16
2020	Cronulla-Sutherland Sharks	19	16	1/1	100.00%	0	66
2021	Cronulla-Sutherland Sharks	13	9	0	—	0	36
2022	Cronulla-Sutherland Sharks	16	14	0	—	0	56
2023	Cronulla-Sutherland Sharks	25	13	0	—	0	52
2024	Cronulla-Sutherland Sharks	24	17	0	—	0	68
2025	Cronulla-Sutherland Sharks	15	7				28
2026	Cronulla-Sutherland Sharks	20	19				76
2027	North Queensland Cowboys						
Career totals		148	102	1/1	100.00%	0	410

=== International ===
Season	Team	Matches	T	G	GK %	F/G	Pts
2022	Tonga	4	1	0	—	0	4
2024	Tonga	2	1				4
Career totals		6	2	0	—	0	8
