= Thomas Hazelton =

Australian rugby league footballer

Tom Hazelton
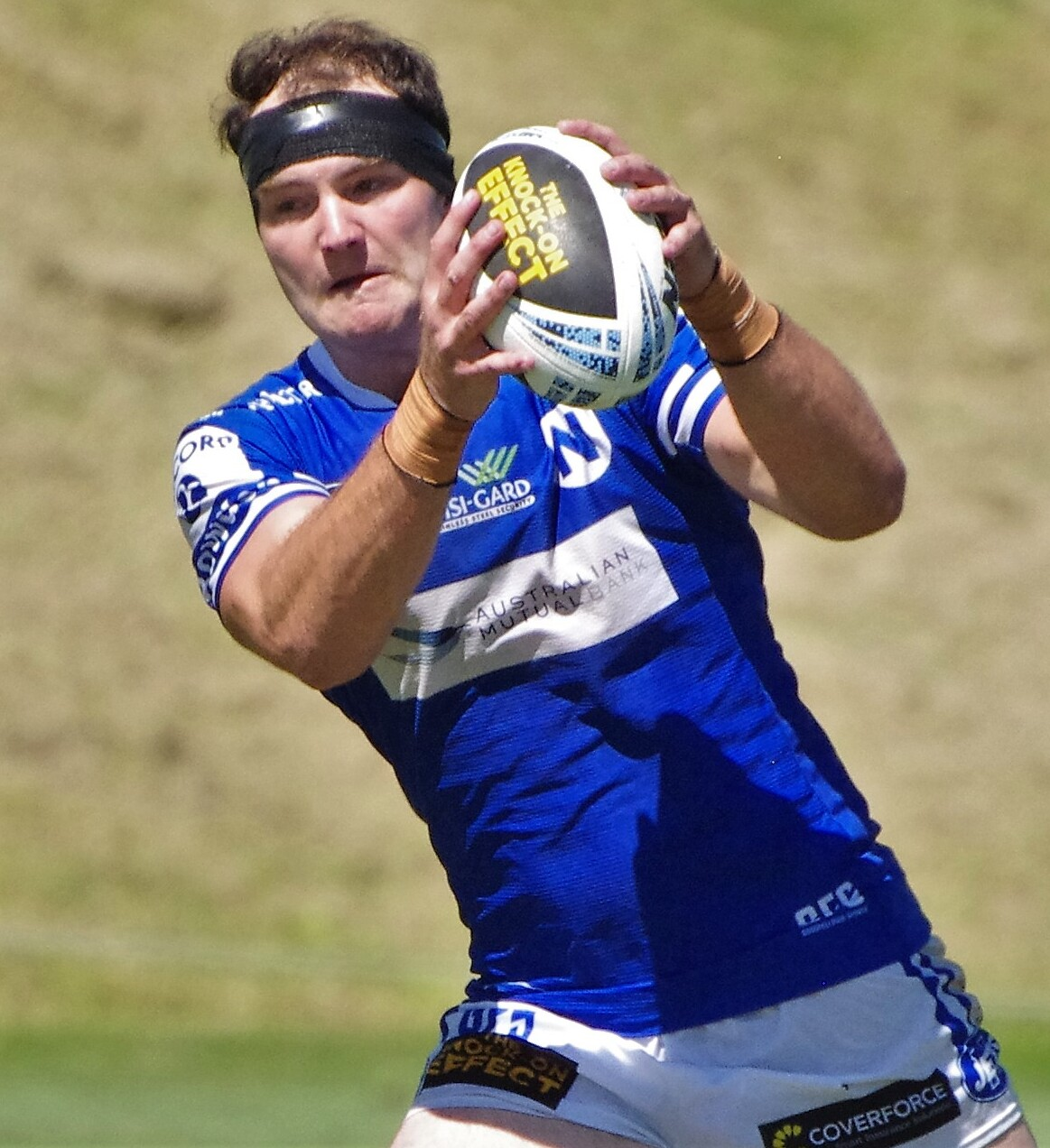

Personal information
- Full name: Thomas Hazelton
- Born: 22 January 1999 (age 27) Goulburn, New South Wales, Australia
- Height: 198 cm (6 ft 6 in)
- Weight: 116 kg (18 st 4 lb)

Playing information
- Position: Prop
Club
Years	Team	Pld	T	G	FG	P
2022–	Cronulla Sharks	81	13	0	0	52
Representative
Years	Team	Pld	T	G	FG	P
2026	Prime Minister's XIII	1	1	0	0	4
- Source: As of 19 November 2026

Thomas Anthony Hazelton (born 22 January 1999) is an Australian professional rugby league footballer who plays as a prop for the Cronulla-Sutherland Sharks in the National Rugby League (NRL).

== Background ==
Hazelton grew up in Goulburn, New South Wales and played his junior rugby league for the Goulburn Stockmen.

== Career ==
=== 2022 ===
Hazelton made his first grade debut for Cronulla against the Sydney Roosters in (Indigenous Round) round 12 of the 2022 NRL season, in a 36–16 loss and became Cronulla player number 552.

=== 2023 ===
Hazelton played a total of 18 games for Cronulla in the 2023 NRL season as Cronulla finished sixth on the table. Hazelton played in the club's 13–12 upset loss against the Sydney Roosters which ended their season.

=== 2024 ===
Hazelton played 25 games for Cronulla in the 2024 NRL season as the club finished 4th on the table and qualified for the finals. Hazelton played in all three of Cronulla's finals matches including their preliminary final loss against Penrith.

=== 2025 ===
Hazleton re-signed with the Cronulla outfit on a three-year deal. On 10 March, Cronulla officially confirmed that he had re-signed with the club until the end of 2028. On 29 May, it was announced that Hazelton would miss at least 12 weeks with a collarbone injury.

=== 2026 ===
Hazelton played 24 games for Cronulla in the 2026 NRL season as the club finished 5th on the table and qualified for the finals. He made his Prime Minister's XIII début on 3 October 2026 in the 10-60 win over PNG Prime Minister's XIII in Port Moresby, scoring a try.

== Statistics ==
=== NRL ===
Statistics are correct as of the end of the 2026 season

Season	Team	Matches	T	G	GK %	F/G	Pts
2022	Cronulla-Sutherland	1	0	0	—	0	0
2023	Cronulla-Sutherland	18	3	0	—	0	12
2024	Cronulla-Sutherland	25	7	0	—	0	28
2025	Cronulla-Sutherland	13	1				4
2026	Cronulla-Sutherland	24	2				8
2027	Cronulla-Sutherland						
Career totals		81	13	0	—	0	52
