= Peter Louis =

Australian rugby league footballer and coach (born 1945)

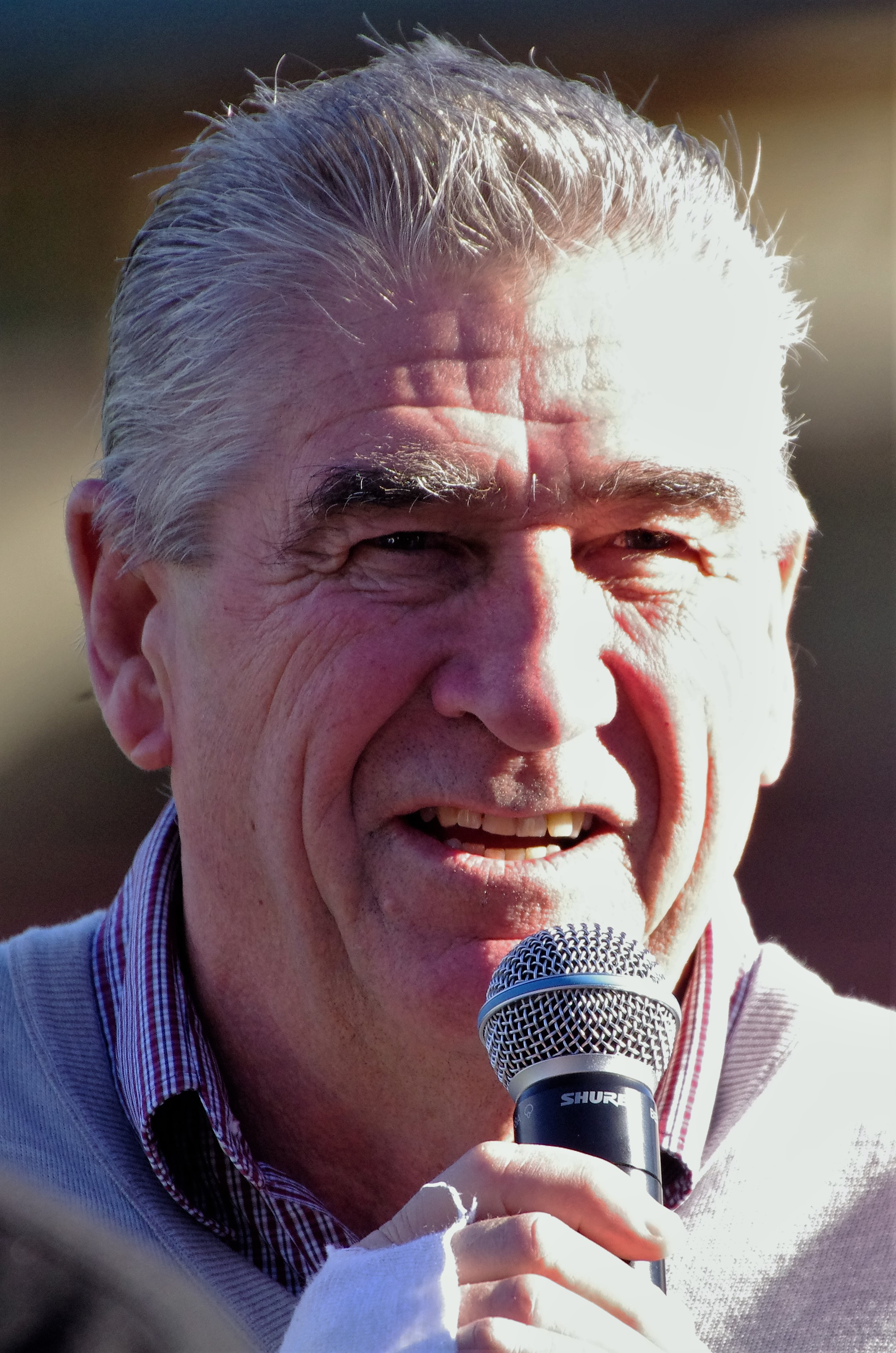

Personal information
- Born: 18 January 1945 (age 81)

Playing information
- Position: Second-row
Club
Years	Team	Pld	T	G	FG	P
1968–70	Canterbury-Bankstown	3	0	0	0	0
1970–??	Woy Woy
	Total	3	0	0	0	0

Coaching information
Club
Years	Team	Gms	W	D	L	W%
1993–99	North Sydney Bears	159	96	7	58	60
Representative
Years	Team	Gms	W	D	L	W%
1997	NSW City	1	0	0	1	0
- Source: As of 2 February 2024

Peter Louis (born 18 January 1945) is an Australian former professional rugby league footballer and coach. He played in the New South Wales Rugby Football League premiership for Sydney's Canterbury-Bankstown club in the 1960s as well as in the country for Woy Woy's club. Louis then started coaching there before returning to Sydney, eventually becoming head coach of the North Sydney Bears in the 1990s. After almost seven seasons he became the National Rugby League referees' coach.

== Playing career ==
Louis started his playing career in Woy Woy before moving to Sydney and joining NSWRFL premiership club, Canterbury-Bankstown in 1968. He played mostly in reserve grade, with a handful of appearances in first grade during the 1969 NSWRFL season. Part-way through the 1970 season Louis returned to Woy Woy where he was captain-coach. He guided the club to a first grade premiership.

== Coaching career ==
Louis returned to Sydney and had success coaching in the New South Wales Rugby Football League's reserve grade for the Parramatta Eels from 1984 to 1989 and the North Sydney Bears from 1990. He replaced Steve Martin as head coach of North Sydney for the 1993 NSWRL season.

After falling just outside the top five play-off group in his first year, he helped the Bears come to within one win of the minor premiership for the 1994 NSWRL season and was named coach of the year at the Dally M Awards. Under Louis Norths then came within one match of the 1996 ARL season's grand final.

The following season in 1997, Louis coached Norths to a 4th placed finish. North Sydney reached their 4th preliminary final in 7 years but once again fell short of an elusive grand final appearance losing to the Newcastle Knights. With less than 10 minutes to play, Norths had scored a try through Michael Buettner which gave captain Jason Taylor the chance to kick a goal which would give Norths a 14-12 lead.

Taylor a normally reliable goal kicker missed the conversion. Newcastle then went on to kick a field goal and score a try right on the full time siren to win the match 17-12.

Louis was appointed coach of City New South Wales for the City vs Country Origin match of 1997 which Country won.

Norths again reached the play-offs in the 1998 NRL season but were eliminated after losing to Parramatta and Canterbury-Bankstown in consecutive weeks.

During the 1999 season, North Sydney's last in the NRL, he announced his retirement as head coach of the club, being succeeded by Kieran Dempsey.

At the end of his coaching career with Norths, Louis had the second highest win percentage out of anyone who had coached the club before him except for 1921 & 1922 premiership winning coach Chris McKivat.

At the end of the 1999 NRL season Louis succeeded Michael Stone as NRL referees' coach. At the end of the 2002 NRL season he resigned from the position.

Sporting positions
Preceded by Steve Martin; 1990–1992	Coach North Sydney; 1993–1999	Succeeded by Kieran Dempsey; 1999
