= Stane Street (disambiguation) =

Stane Street was a Roman road, running from London Bridge to Chichester in West Sussex.

Stane Street may also refer to:

- Stane Street (Colchester) – from Braughing (Hertfordshire) to Colchester (Essex)
  - Stane Street Halt railway station, near Takeley, Essex, adjacent to the above

== See also ==
- Stanegate, a Roman road running from Corbridge to Carlisle to the south of Hadrian's Wall
- Stone Street (disambiguation)
