= Kieran Dempsey =

Australian rugby league footballer and coach

Personal information
- Full name: Kieran Dempsey

Coaching information
Club
Years	Team	Gms	W	D	L	W%
1999	North Sydney Bears	8	2	0	6	25

Kieran Dempsey is an Australian former head coach of North Sydney who played in the National Rugby League competition. Dempsey was the last head coach of the club when they were a first grade side.

== Coaching career ==
Dempsey was the assistant coach to North Sydney head coach Peter Louis during the 1999 NRL season. Midway through 1999, Louis departed the club after 7 seasons in charge and Dempsey was promoted to be the new head coach.

At the time of his appointment, Norths were sitting 12th on the table and were enduring one of their toughest seasons. Dempsey's first six games in charge all ended in defeats including a 56–18 loss against Cronulla-Sutherland.

Dempsey's first win came in round 25 1999 against Melbourne at North Sydney Oval which would also prove to be the club's last first grade game played at the ground.

The following week, Dempsey coached Norths in their final game as a first grade side when they faced North Queensland at the Willows Sports Complex. North Sydney would win the match 28–18. At the conclusion of 1999, Norths fell victim to the NRL's rationalisation policy and were forced to merge with arch rivals Manly-Warringah to form the Northern Eagles.

In August 2024, Dempsey became North Sydney's NSW Cup head coach once again after their former coach Pat Weisner was deregistered by the NSWRL for betting on matches. On 29 September 2024, Dempsey coached North Sydney in their 2024 NSW Cup Grand Final loss against Newtown.

== Post coaching ==
In 2014, Dempsey was hired as a talent scout for Melbourne. Dempsey later joined the club's recruitment and pathways team.
