= Tui Katoa =

Tongan rugby league footballer

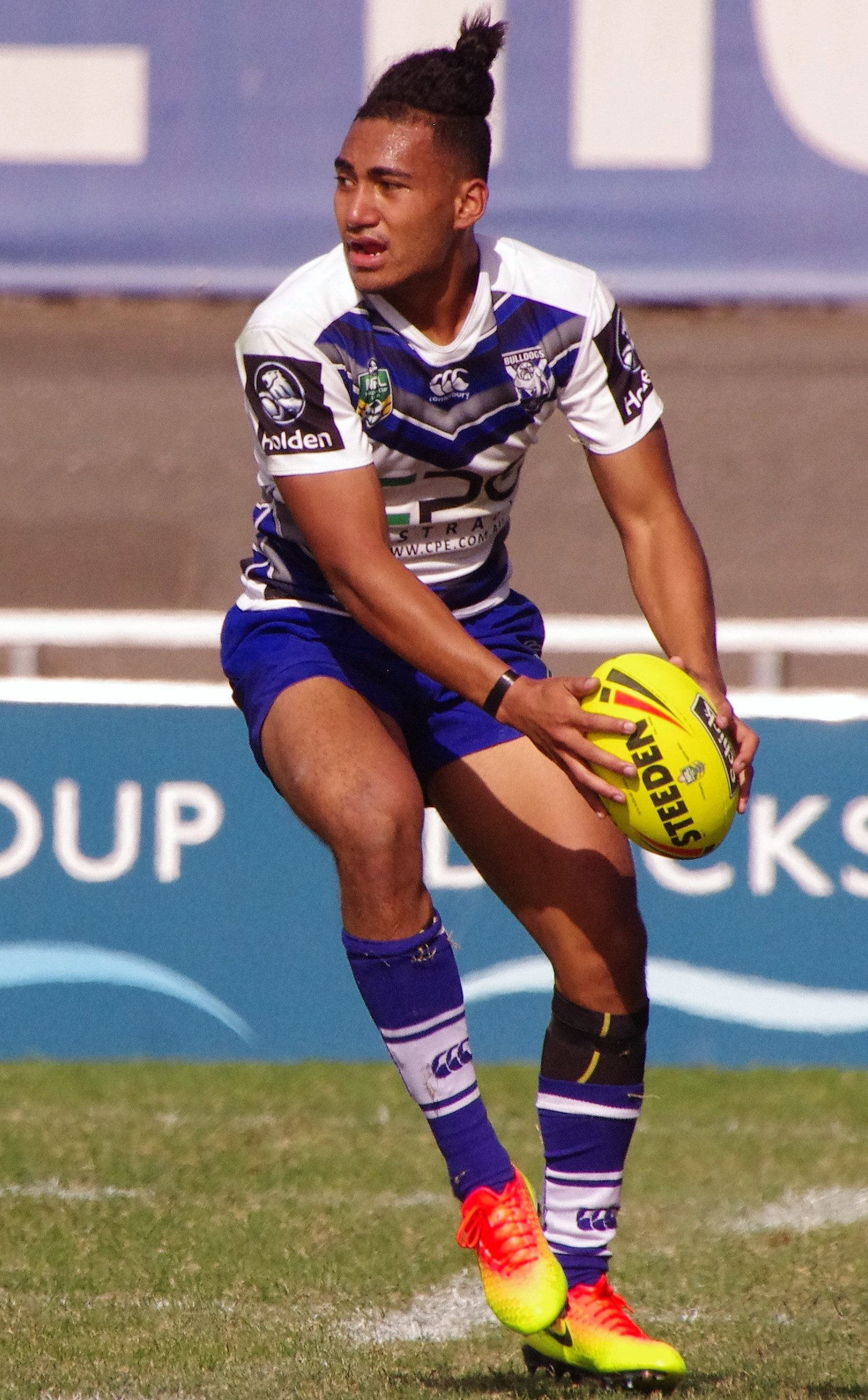

Personal information
- Full name: Tuipulotu Katoa
- Born: 27 April 1999 (age 27) Hamilton, New Zealand
- Height: 184 cm (6 ft 0 in)
- Weight: 88 kg (13 st 12 lb)

Playing information
- Position: Wing
Club
Years	Team	Pld	T	G	FG	P
2020–22	Canterbury Bulldogs	10	2	0	0	8
Representative
Years	Team	Pld	T	G	FG	P
2019	Tonga 9s	2	0	0	0	0
- Source: As of 19 May 2021
- Relatives: Sione Katoa (brother)

Tui Katoa (born 27 April 1999) is a Tonga international rugby league footballer who plays on the wing for North Sydney Bears in the NSW Cup.

He previously played for the Canterbury-Bankstown Bulldogs in the National Rugby League (NRL).

== Background ==
Katoa was born in Hamilton, New Zealand and is of Tongan descent. Katoa is the younger brother of Cronulla-Sutherland Sharks player, Sione.

He played his junior rugby league for the Chester Hill Hornets before being signed by the Canterbury-Bankstown Bulldogs.

== Playing career ==
Katoa played for the Canterbury-Bankstown junior sides from 2015 to 2018.

=== 2019 ===
Katoa spent the 2019 season primarily playing in the Canterbury Cup NSW as well as the Jersey Flegg Cup. He was selected to represent the New South Wales Under-20's in a 36–10 win. At the end of the season, Katoa was named in the 16-man Tongan World Nines squad.

=== 2020 ===
In round 20 of the 2020 NRL season, Katoa made his debut for Canterbury-Bankstown against the Penrith Panthers, coming off the bench for 55 minutes in a 42–0 loss.

=== 2021 ===
Katoa made a total of 11 appearances for Canterbury in the 2021 NRL season as the club finished last and claimed the Wooden Spoon.

=== 2022 & 2023 ===
In 2022, Katoa continued to play for Mounties in the NSW Cup. In 2023, he signed for the Sydney Roosters but made no appearances for the first grade team. Instead he played for the clubs feeder side North Sydney in the NSW Cup.
