= Samuel Stonestreet =

Australian rugby league player

Sam Stonestreet
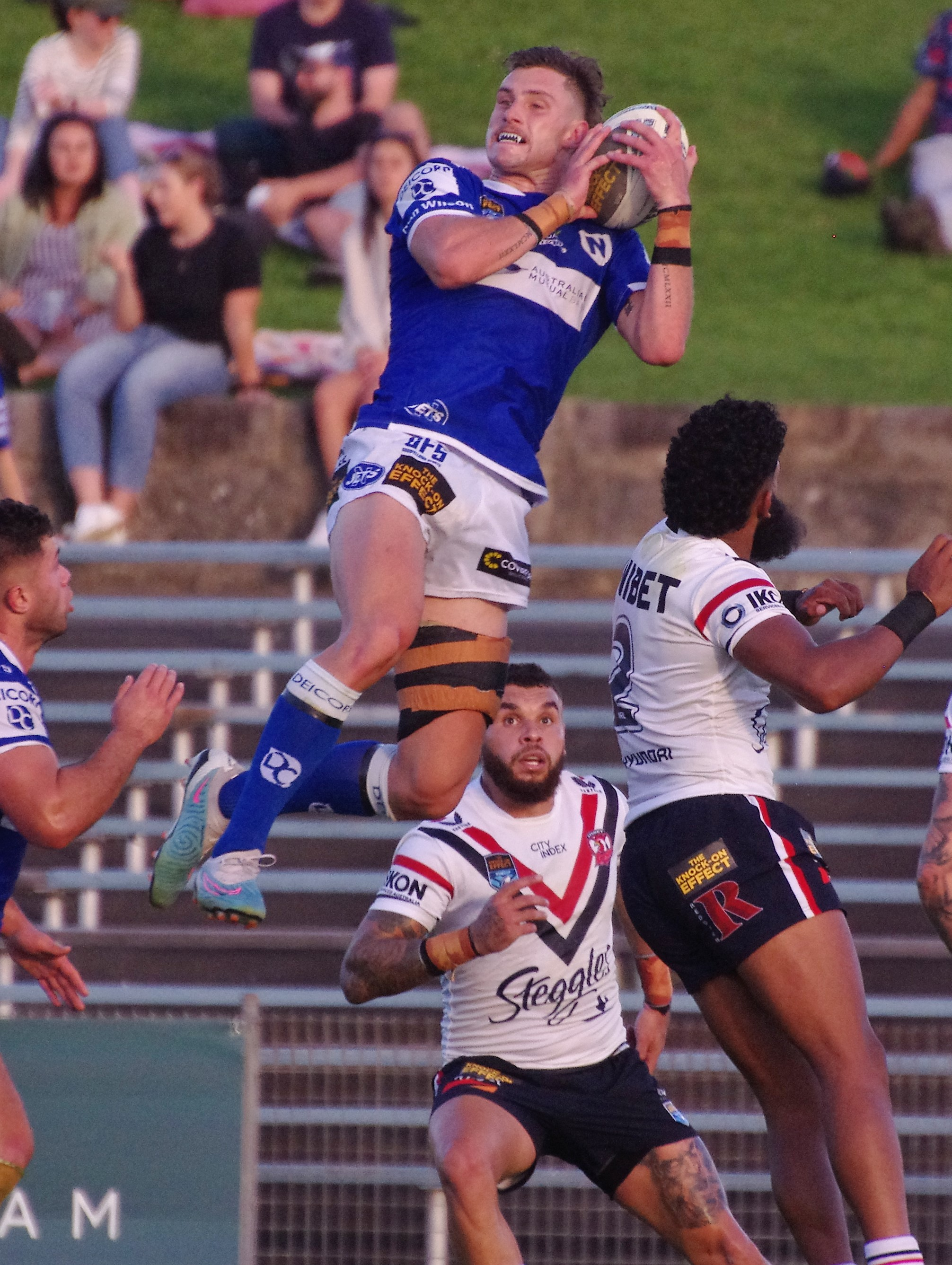

Personal information
- Full name: Samuel Stonestreet
- Born: 2 July 2002 (age 24) Westmead, New South Wales, Australia
- Height: 193 cm (6 ft 4 in)
- Weight: 97 kg (15 st 4 lb)

Playing information
- Position: Wing
Club
Years	Team	Pld	T	G	FG	P
2024–	Cronulla Sharks	28	20	0	0	80
- Source: As of 7 June 2026
- Education: De La Salle College, Cronulla
- Relatives: Ken Stonestreet (grandfather); George Stonestreet (great uncle); Terry Hill (cousin)

Samuel Stonestreet (born 2 July 2002) is an Australian professional rugby league footballer who plays as a winger for the Cronulla-Sutherland Sharks in the National Rugby League.

== Background ==
Stonestreet played his junior football for De La Salle Junior Rugby League Football Club Caringbah and is the grandson of Ken Stonestreet who played over 150 first grade games in the 1960's and 70s. Growing up, Stonestreet's favourite player was Luke Covell.

Stonestreet went to school at De La Salle College, Cronulla where he completed the HSC in 2020.

== Playing career ==
=== 2024 ===
In round 7 of the NRL season, Stonestreet made his debut for Cronulla in the teams win against the North Queensland Cowboys, Stonestreet scored a try in the 42-6 win. In round 23, Stonestreet scored two tries in Cronulla's 44-0 victory over the Gold Coast. In round 25, Stonestreet scored two tries for Cronulla in their 38-10 victory over rivals St. George Illawarra.

The following week, he scored two tries for Cronulla in their 30-28 loss against the New Zealand Warriors.

On 29 September, Stonestreet played for Newtown in their 2024 NSW Cup Grand Final victory over North Sydney.

=== 2025 ===
In round 2 of the 2025 NRL season, Stonestreet scored two tries for Cronulla in their 36-12 victory over North Queensland. In round 6, Stonestreet scored two tries for Cronulla in their 24-18 victory over Manly. On 3 September, the Cronulla outfit announced that Stonestreet had extended with the club for a further year. Stonestreet played eleven matches for Cronulla in the 2025 NRL season as the club finished 5th on the table.

=== 2026 ===
On 29 May 2026, Cronulla announced that Stonestreet had re-signed with the club until 2029.

Stonestreet played 12 matches for Cronulla in the 2026 NRL season as the club finished 5th on the table and qualified for the finals. Stonestreet spent most of the year playing for the clubs feeder side Newtown in the NSW Cup. On 26 September, he played for Newtown in their NSW Cup Grand Final loss to Penrith.
