= Liam Ison =

Australian rugby league footballer

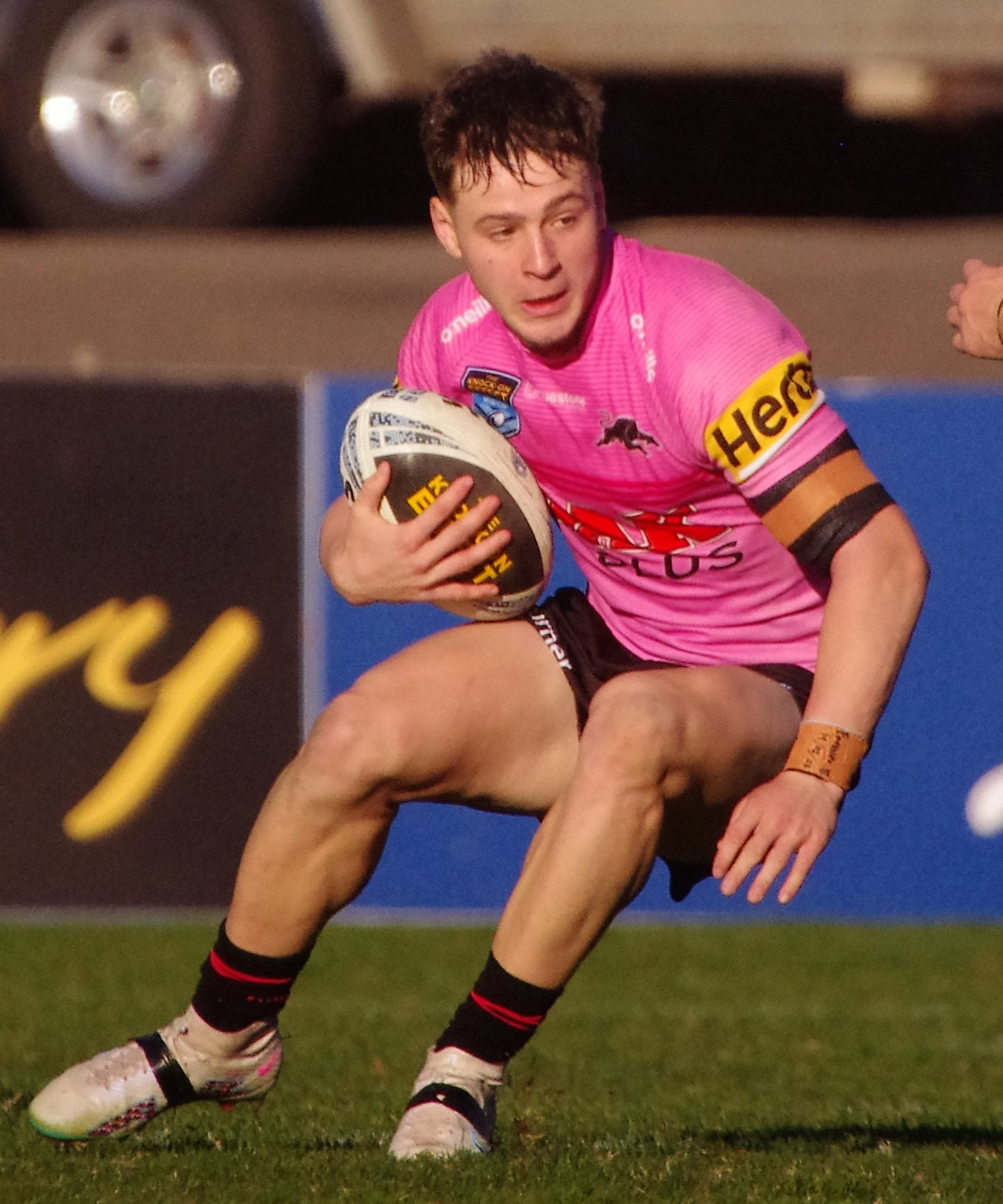

Personal information
- Full name: Liam Ison
- Born: 21 December 2004 (age 21) Penrith, New South Wales, Australia
- Height: 180 cm (5 ft 11 in)
- Weight: 80 kg (12 st 8 lb)

Playing information
- Position: Fullback
Club
Years	Team	Pld	T	G	FG	P
2024–	Cronulla Sharks	1	0	0	0	0

Liam Ison (born 21 December 2004) is an Australian rugby league footballer who plays as a fullback for the Cronulla-Sutherland Sharks in the National Rugby League.

== Background ==
Ison played his junior football for St Dominic's College, Penrith and came up through the grades via the Penrith Panthers system. Ison went to school at St Dominic's College, Penrith where he completed his HSC in 2022.

== Playing career ==
In 2024, Ison joined the Cronulla-Sutherland Sharks on a development contract. In round 21 of the 2024 NRL season, Ison made his first grade debut for Cronulla at fullback in his side's 30−22 loss to the North Queensland Cowboys at North Queensland Stadium. On 6 December 2024, Ison announced that he had re-signed with the club on a two-year deal. On 26 September 2026, Ison played in Newtown's NSW Cup Grand Final loss against Penrith.
