= Jayden Berrell =

Australian rugby league footballer (born 1995)

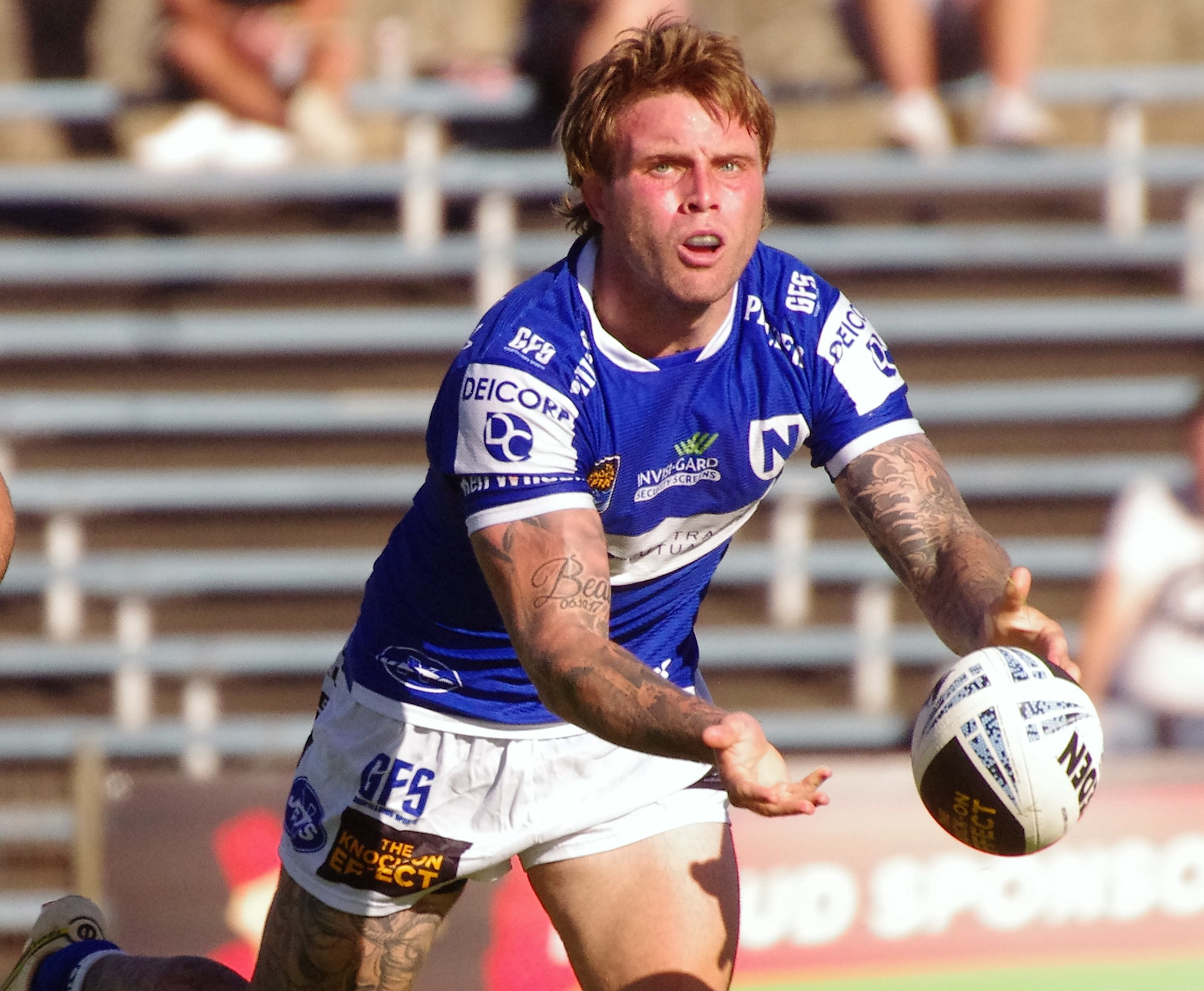

Personal information
- Full name: Jayden Berrell
- Born: 1 June 1995 (age 31) Ipswich, Queensland, Australia
- Height: 177 cm (5 ft 10 in)
- Weight: 87 kg (13 st 10 lb)

Playing information
- Position: Hooker
Club
Years	Team	Pld	T	G	FG	P
2024–26	Cronulla Sharks	7	0	0	0	0

Jayden Berrell (born 1 June 1995) is an Australian professional rugby league footballer who last played as a hooker for the Cronulla-Sutherland Sharks in the National Rugby League and hooker for the Newtown Jets in the NSW Cup.

== Early life ==
Berrell was born in Ipswich, Queensland on 1 June 1995 playing junior for Runaway Bay.

== Playing career ==
=== 2016 ===
In 2016, Berrell signed a 1-year contract with the Norths Devils playing 16 games and scoring 1 try.

=== 2017 ===
In 2017, Berrell joined the Wynnum Manly Seagulls after signing a 3-year contract with the club. He played 20 games and scored 3 tries. Additionally he earned the title of the 2017 Wynnum Manly Leagues Club Intrust Super Cup Player of the Year.

=== 2018 ===
In 2018, Berrell played 15 games scoring 2 tries.

=== 2019 ===
In 2019, Berrell played his last season of his contract with 26 games for the Wynnum Manly Seagulls, scoring 7 tries and helping the team reach the grand finals where they lost 10–28 to the Burleigh Bears.

=== 2021 ===
In 2021, Berrell signed a 1-year contract with the Wynnum Manly Seagulls. He played 20 games scoring 12 tries and assisting the team reach the grand finals losing 10–16 to the Norths Devils.

=== 2022-2023 ===
In 2022, Berrell joined the Newtown Jets playing 17 games and scoring 6 tries. He captained the team throughout round 18, round 21, round 23 and the preliminary final. After a standout season in 2021 with the Wynnum Manly Seagulls, the Cronulla-Sutherland Sharks signed him with a 2 year contract. Berrell spent the entire 2023 season with Cronulla’s feeder side the Newtown Jets, where he was named the club’s player of the season. He later re-signed with the Sharks for the 2024 season.

2024

After spending the majority of the season in reserve grade, Berrell was called onto the interchange bench for the Sharks’ round 21 fixture against the North Queensland Cowboys to make his NRL debut. After spending 12 seasons in reserve grade, Berrell’s debut at 29 years of age makes him amongst the oldest debutants in the modern NRL era. Berrell went on to make a total of 3 appearances with Cronulla’s top-grade side in the 2024 season. In reserve grade, Berrell was a part of the Newtown Jets team that won the NSW Cup premiership. Berrell was named to the NSW Cup team of the year, as the best hooker across the season.

2026

After making no top-grade appearances in the 2025 NRL season, Berrell was named in Cronulla’s Round 11 team for his first appearance of the 2026 season. In late September it was reported that Berrell would depart the club at the end of the season and return home to Queensland to play in the QRL. Berrell played for Newtown in their 2026 NSW Cup Grand Final loss to Penrith.
