= Ken Stonestreet =

Australian rugby league footballer

Personal information
- Full name: Kenneth Paul Stonestreet
- Born: 29 January 1942 Sydney, New South Wales, Australia
- Died: 28 May 2015 (aged 73) Sydney, New South Wales, Australia

Playing information
- Position: Hooker
Club
Years	Team	Pld	T	G	FG	P
1963–66	Eastern Suburbs	30	0	0	0	0
1967–72	Western Suburbs	124	8	0	1	26
	Total	154	8	0	1	26
Representative
Years	Team	Pld	T	G	FG	P
1969	New South Wales	1	1	0	0	3
- Source: As of 8 July 2019
- Relatives: George Stonestreet (cousin); Terry Hill (cousin); Samuel Stonestreet (grandson)

Kenneth Paul Stonestreet (29 January 1942 – 28 May 2015), nicknamed "Nebo", was an Australian professional rugby league footballer who played in the 1960s and 1970s. He played for Western Suburbs and Eastern Suburbs in the New South Wales Rugby League (NSWRL) competition.

== Playing career ==
Stonestreet grew up in Dulwich Hill and Marrickville. He played his junior football for Camperdown Dragons in the Newtown District and Redfern United in the South Sydney District.

Stonestreet made his first grade debut for Eastern Suburbs against Newtown in 1963 at Henson Park which ended in a 19-0 loss. Stonestreet played with Easts between 1963 and 1966 but his time at the club was not successful as they finished last in 1963, 1965 and 1966. In his final year at Easts, the club went the whole season without winning a single game. As of 2019, Eastern Suburbs are the last team to have gone the whole year without winning a match.

Stonestreet joined Western Suburbs in 1967. In 1969, Stonestreet was selected to play for New South Wales and featured in one game against Queensland. Stonestreet's time at Western Suburbs was mixed with the club missing the finals each year and finished last in 1971. Stonestreet retired as a player at the end of 1972 and then went on to coach the Western Suburbs Under 23 team for 2 seasons.
