= Niwhai Puru =

Australian rugby league footballer (born 2002)

Personal information
- Born: 2 July 2002 (age 24) Blacktown, Sydney, Australia
- Height: 178 cm (5 ft 10 in)
- Weight: 91 kg (14 st 5 lb)

Playing information
- Position: Halfback
Club
| Years | Team | Pld | T | G | FG | P |
|---|---|---|---|---|---|---|
| 2026 | Cronulla Sharks | 7 | 1 | 4 | 0 | 12 |
| 2027– | Perth Bears | 0 | 0 | 0 | 0 | 0 |
| | Total | 7 | 1 | 4 | 0 | 12 |
- Source: RLP As of 26 October 2026

Niwhai Puru (born 2 July 2002) is an Australian professional rugby league footballer who plays as halfback for the Perth Bears in the NRL.

== Early life ==
Puru, one of triplets, was born in Sydney to an Indigenous Australian father (Mununjali and Gidhabal) and Māori mother. He was raised in Sydney, attending Patrician Brothers' College, Blacktown.

== Career ==
A halfback, Puru played junior rugby league for the Windsor Wolves and started out in the lower grades with the Penrith Panthers. He was signed by Cronulla-Sutherland prior to the 2023 season and spent four years playing for their feeder club the Newtown Jets in the NSW Cup, notably securing man of the match honours in their 2024 grand final win. In 2025, Puru represented the Indigenous All Stars in the 2025 All Stars match, alongside twin brother and Cronulla teammate Hohepa.

Puru made his first-grade debut for the Sharks in round 13 of the 2026 NRL season, with regular halfback Nicho Hynes out injured. He featured in a further six matches, which included the semi-final loss to the Sydney Roosters when he came on off the bench. Following the 2026 season, Puru left Cronulla to join 2027-debutants the Perth Bears on a two-year contract.
