= George Stonestreet =

Australian rugby league footballer

Personal information
- Full name: George Albert Stonestreet
- Born: 27 August 1915; Petersham, New South Wales, Australia
- Died: 24 July 1993 (aged 77); Umina, New South Wales, Australia

Playing information
- Position: Lock, Hooker, Second-row
Club
| Years | Team | Pld | T | G | FG | P |
|---|---|---|---|---|---|---|
| 1937–42 | Newtown | 45 | 6 | 0 | 0 | 18 |
- Relatives: Terry Hill (grandson); Ken Stonestreet (cousin)

George Albert Stonestreet (1915–1993) was an Australian rugby league footballer who played in the 1930s and 1940s.

A prospect from the Newtown junior league, Stonestreet was graded in 1937 and rose through the ranks rapidly and had his first grade debut for Newtown on 19 June 1937. He retired at the end of the 1943 season.

Stonestreet died on 24 July 1993 at Umina, New South Wales.
