= Tuku Hau Tapuha =

NZ Rugby league player

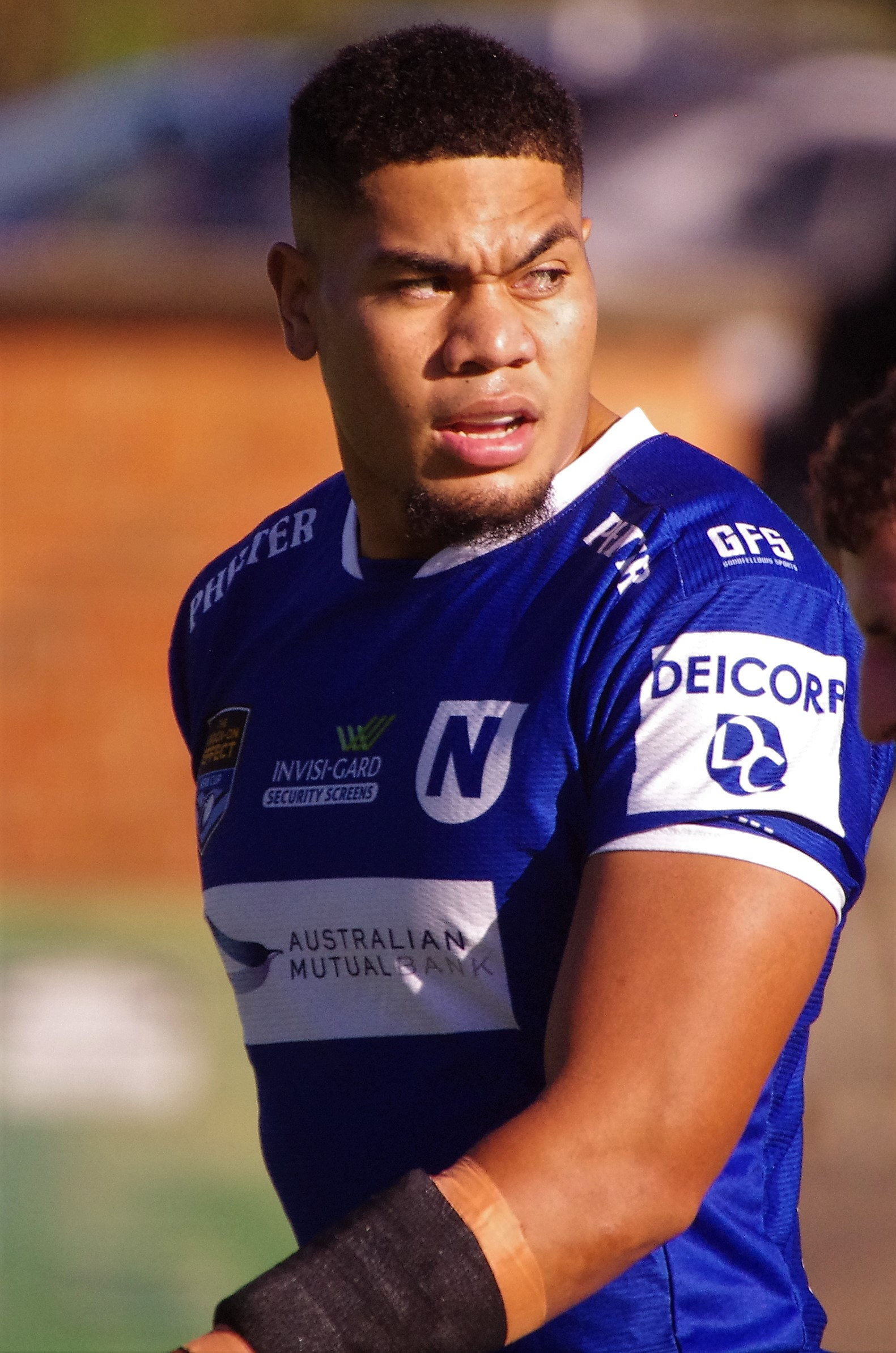

Personal information
- Full name: Tukupa-Ke Taa’i Hau Tapuha
- Born: 10 December 2001 (age 24) Pukekohe, New Zealand
- Height: 196 cm (6 ft 5 in)
- Weight: 114 kg (17 st 13 lb)

Playing information
- Position: Prop
Club
| Years | Team | Pld | T | G | FG | P |
|---|---|---|---|---|---|---|
| 2021–23 | Sydney Roosters | 3 | 0 | 0 | 0 | 0 |
| 2024– | Cronulla Sharks | 19 | 2 | 0 | 0 | 8 |
| | Total | 22 | 2 | 0 | 0 | 8 |
Representative
| Years | Team | Pld | T | G | FG | P |
| 2022 | Māori All Stars | 1 | 0 | 0 | 0 | 0 |
- Source: As of 17 July 2026

Tukupa-Ke Taa’i Hau Tapuha (born 10 December 2001) is a New Zealand professional rugby league footballer who plays as a prop for the Cronulla-Sutherland Sharks in the NRL.

== Background ==
Hau Tapuha was born in Pukekohe and is of Māori & Tongan descent. He moved to Brisbane when was 11-years-old. He played his first junior rugby league for Pine Central Holy Spirit and then Valleys Diehards when he was 14.

Hau Tapuha attended Wavell State High School and represented the Queensland Schoolboys side before being signed by the Sydney Roosters.

== Playing career ==
=== Early career ===
In 2015, Hau Tapuha represented the Brisbane Stingers under-14 side while playing for Valleys. In 2018, he played for the Redcliffe Dolphins in the Mal Meninga Cup.

In 2019, Hau Tapuha moved to Sydney, playing for the Roosters SG Ball Cup side. In 2020, he moved up to the club's Jersey Flegg Cup side. On 15 December 2020, he re-signed with the Roosters until the end of the 2022 season.

=== 2021 ===
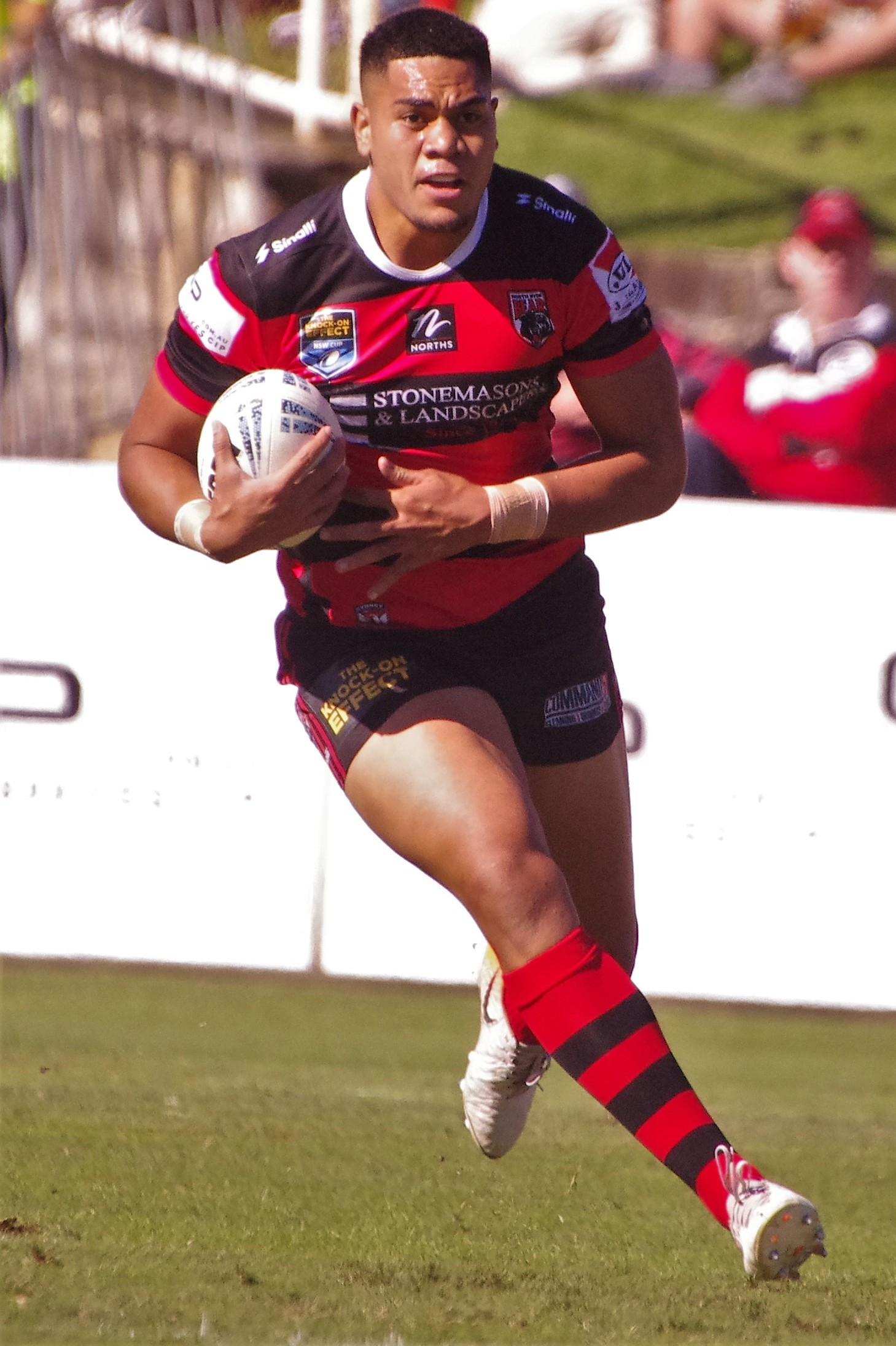
Hau Tapuha playing for the North Sydney Bears in 2021

Hau Tapuha began the 2021 season playing for North Sydney in the NSW Cup.

In round 9 of the 2021 NRL season, Hau Tapuha made his first grade debut for the Sydney Roosters against Parramatta.

=== 2024 ===
In round 2 of the 2024 NRL season, Hau Tapuha made his club debut for Cronulla in their 25–6 victory over Canterbury. He played ten games for the club throughout the season as they finished 4th on the table and qualified for the finals. On 29 September, he played for Newtown in their 2024 NSW Cup Grand Final victory over North Sydney. On 20 December, the Sharks announced that Hau Tapuha had re-signed with the club until the end of 2026.

=== 2025 ===
He was limited to just six games for Cronulla in the 2025 NRL season as the club finished 5th on the table.

=== 2026 ===
On 26 September, he played for Newtown in their NSW Cup Grand Final loss against Penrith. On 28 October 2026, the Sharks announced that Hau Tapuha had re-signed with the club for a further two years.
