= 2022 South Sydney Rabbitohs season =

Rugby team season

Team information
- CEO: Blake Solly
- Head Coach: Jason Demetriou (First Grade)
- Captain: Cameron Murray
- Stadium: Stadium Australia
- Avg. attendance: 15,609
- High attendance: 30,194 v Canterbury Bankstown, Round 6
← 2021	List of seasons	2023 →

The 2022 season is the 113th in the history of the South Sydney Rabbitohs. Coached by Jason Demetriou and captained by Cameron Murray, they competed in the National Rugby League's 2022 Telstra Premiership.

== Pre-season ==
19 February 2022
17:00 AEST (UTC+10:00)

North Queensland Cowboys	24 – 12	South Sydney Rabbitohs
	Report

Barlow Park, Cairns
Attendance: 7,128

26 February 2022
19:00 AEDT (UTC+11:00)

South Sydney Rabbitohs	10 – 16	St. George Illawarra Dragons
	Report

Glen Willow Regional Sports Stadium, Mudgee
Attendance: 9,257

== Season summary ==
=== Ladder ===
2022 NRL season
Pos	Team	Pld	W	D	L	B	PF	PA	PD	Pts
1	Penrith Panthers (P)	24	20	0	4	1	636	330	+306	42
2	Cronulla-Sutherland Sharks	24	18	0	6	1	573	364	+209	38
3	North Queensland Cowboys	24	17	0	7	1	633	361	+272	36
4	Parramatta Eels	24	16	0	8	1	608	489	+119	34
5	Melbourne Storm	24	15	0	9	1	657	410	+247	32
6	Sydney Roosters	24	15	0	9	1	635	434	+201	32
7	South Sydney Rabbitohs	24	14	0	10	1	604	474	+130	30
8	Canberra Raiders	24	14	0	10	1	524	461	+63	30
9	Brisbane Broncos	24	13	0	11	1	514	550	−36	28
10	St. George Illawarra Dragons	24	12	0	12	1	469	569	−100	26
11	Manly Warringah Sea Eagles	24	9	0	15	1	490	595	−105	20
12	Canterbury-Bankstown Bulldogs	24	7	0	17	1	383	575	−192	16
13	Gold Coast Titans	24	6	0	18	1	455	660	−205	14
14	Newcastle Knights	24	6	0	18	1	372	662	−290	14
15	New Zealand Warriors	24	6	0	18	1	408	700	−292	14
16	Wests Tigers	24	4	0	20	1	352	679	−327	10

=== Ladder progression ===
- Numbers highlighted in green indicate that the team finished the round inside the top eight.
- Numbers highlighted in blue indicates the team finished first on the ladder in that round.
- Numbers highlighted in red indicates the team finished last place on the ladder in that round.
- Underlined numbers indicate that the team had a bye during that round.

	Team	1	2	3	4	5	6	7	8	9	10	11	12	13	14	15	16	17	18	19	20	21	22	23	24	25
1	Penrith Panthers	2	4	6	8	10	12	14	16	16	18	20	22	24	26	28	30	32	34	36	36	38	38	40	42	42
2	Cronulla-Sutherland Sharks	0	2	4	6	8	8	10	10	12	12	14	14	16	18	20	22	24	26	26	28	30	32	34	36	38
3	North Queensland Cowboys	0	2	4	4	4	6	8	10	12	14	16	16	18	20	22	24	26	26	28	30	32	32	34	34	36
4	Parramatta Eels	2	2	4	6	8	8	10	10	12	12	14	16	18	18	20	20	22	24	24	26	28	28	30	32	34
5	Melbourne Storm	2	4	4	6	8	10	12	14	16	16	16	18	20	22	24	24	24	24	24	26	28	30	32	32	32
6	Sydney Roosters	0	2	2	4	6	8	8	8	10	12	12	14	14	14	14	14	16	18	20	22	24	26	28	30	32
7	South Sydney Rabbitohs	0	0	2	2	4	6	6	8	8	10	10	12	14	16	16	18	20	22	24	24	26	28	28	30	30
8	Canberra Raiders	2	2	4	4	4	4	4	4	6	8	10	10	12	12	14	14	16	18	20	22	22	24	26	28	30
9	Brisbane Broncos	2	4	4	4	4	4	6	8	10	12	14	16	18	20	20	20	22	24	26	26	26	28	28	28	28
10	St. George Illawarra Dragons	2	2	2	2	2	4	6	8	8	8	10	12	14	14	16	18	18	18	20	20	20	20	22	24	26
11	Manly Warringah Sea Eagles	0	0	2	4	6	8	8	8	10	10	10	10	12	14	14	16	18	20	20	20	20	20	20	20	20
12	Canterbury-Bankstown Bulldogs	2	2	2	2	2	2	2	4	4	4	4	4	4	6	8	8	10	10	12	14	14	14	14	14	16
13	Newcastle Knights	2	4	4	4	4	4	4	4	4	6	6	8	10	10	10	12	12	12	12	12	14	14	14	14	14
14	New Zealand Warriors	0	0	2	4	6	6	6	8	8	8	8	8	8	8	8	10	12	12	12	12	12	14	14	14	14
15	Gold Coast Titans	0	2	2	4	4	4	4	4	4	6	6	6	6	6	6	6	8	8	8	8	8	10	10	12	14
16	Wests Tigers	0	0	0	0	0	2	4	4	4	4	6	6	8	8	8	8	8	8	8	10	10	10	10	10	10

== Results ==
Date	Day	Competition	Opposition	Result	Score	Captain(s)	Venue	Crowd	Rank	
Regular season
Mar 11th	Friday 8:05pm	Round 1	Brisbane Broncos	Loss	4-11	Cameron Murray	Suncorp Stadium	32,002	12th	
Mar 17th	Thursday 8:00pm	Round 2	Melbourne Storm	Loss	14-15	Cameron Murray	AAMI Park	13,269	13th	
Mar 25th	Friday 8:00pm	Round 3	Sydney Roosters	Win	28-16	Cameron Murray	Accor Stadium	18,245	15th	
Apr 1st	Friday 8:00pm	Round 4	Penrith Panthers	Loss	12-26	Cameron Murray	BlueBet Stadium	20,521	13th	
Apr 9th	Saturday 5:30pm	Round 5	St. George Illawarra Dragons	Win	24-12	Cameron Murray	Accor Stadium	11,332	13th	
Apr 15th	Friday 4:00pm	Round 6	Canterbury-Bankstown Bulldogs	Win	36-16	Cameron Murray	Accor Stadium	30,194	9th	
Apr 23rd	Saturday 7:30pm	Round 7	Wests Tigers	Loss	22-23	Cameron Murray	CommBank Stadium	14,251	11th	
Apr 29th	Friday 8:00pm	Round 8	Manly Warringah Sea Eagles	Win	40-22	Cameron Murray	Central Coast Stadium	17,284	10th	
May 5	Thursday 7:50pm	Round 9	Brisbane Broncos	Loss	12-32	Cameron Murray	Accor Stadium	9,242	11th	
May 14	Saturday 3:00pm	Round 10	New Zealand Warriors	Win	32-30	Cody Walker	Suncorp Stadium	46,454	9th	
May 22	Sunday 2:00pm	Round 11	Canberra Raiders	Loss	12-32	Cody Walker	Apex Oval	11,124	11th	
May 28	Saturday 5:30pm	Round 12	Wests Tigers	Win	44-18	Cameron Murray	Accor Stadium	13,585	9th	
Jun 11th	Saturday 3:00pm	Round 14	Gold Coast Titans	Win	30-16	Cameron Murray	Cbus Super Stadium	14,290	7th	
Jun 16th	Thursday 7:50pm	Round 15	St. George Illawarra Dragons	Loss	12-32	Cameron Murray	WIN Stadium	11,257	8th	
Jul 2nd	Saturday 7:35pm	Round 16	Parramatta Eels	Win	30-12	Cameron Murray	Accor Stadium	10,102	8th	
Jul 8th	Friday 7:55pm	Round 17	Newcastle Knights	Win	40-28	Latrell Mitchell	McDonald Jones Stadium	18,621	7th	
Jul 17th	Sunday 6:15pm	Round 18	Canterbury-Bankstown Bulldogs	Win	36-28	Latrell Mitchell	Accor Stadium	19,126	7th	
Jul 23rd	Saturday 7:35pm	Round 19	Melbourne Storm	Win	24-12	Cameron Murray	Accor Stadium	11,217	6th	
Jul 30th	Saturday 5:30pm	Round 20	Cronulla-Sutherland Sharks	Loss	20-21	Cameron Murray	PointsBet Stadium	11,492	7th	
Aug 6th	Saturday 3:00pm	Round 21	New Zealand Warriors	Win	48-10	Cameron Murray	Sunshine Coast Stadium	8,911	6th	
Aug 12th	Friday 7:55pm	Round 22	Parramatta Eels	Win	26-0	Cameron Murray	CommBank Stadium	22,958	5th	
Aug 18th	Thursday 7:50pm	Round 23	Penrith Panthers	Loss	22-26	Cameron Murray	Accor Stadium	15,208	7th	
Aug 27th	Saturday 7:35pm	Round 24	North Queensland Cowboys	Win	20-10	Cameron Murray	Accor Stadium	15,264	7th	
Sep 2nd	Friday 7:55pm	Round 25	Sydney Roosters	Loss	16-26	Cameron Murray	Allianz Stadium	41,906	7th	
Finals
Sep 11th	Sunday 4:00pm	Elimination Final	Sydney Roosters	Win	30-14	Cameron Murray	Allianz Stadium	39,816	7th	
Sep 18th	Saturday 8:00pm	Semi Final	Cronulla-Sutherland Sharks	Win	38-12	Cameron Murray	Allianz Stadium	39,733	7th	7th
Sep 24th	Saturday 7:50pm	Preliminary Final	Penrith Panthers	Loss	12-32	Cameron Murray	Accor Stadium	50,035		7th

== Player statistics ==
Player	Games	Tries	Goals	Field goals	Points
Jai Arrow	23	1	0	0	4
Thomas Burgess	20	2	0	0	8
Jed Cartwright	4	0	0	0	0
Michael Chee-Kam	3	0	0	0	0
Damien Cook	20	8	0	0	32
Daniel Suluka-Fifita	5	0	0	0	0
Campbell Graham	17	5	0	0	20
Siliva Havili	21	1	0	0	4
Dean Hawkins	1	0	0	0	0
Jacob Host	8	0	0	0	0
Lachlan Ilias	23	4	0	0	16
Alex Johnston	23	28	0	0	112
Richard Kennar	1	3	0	0	12
Liam Knight	8	0	0	0	0
Keaon Koloamatangi	24	7	0	0	28
Peter Mamouzelos	2	1	0	0	4
Josh Mansour	5	2	0	0	8
Taane Milne	19	8	0	0	32
Latrell Mitchell	14	6	47	1	120
Shaquai Mitchell	3	0	0	0	0
Davvy Moale	12	0	0	0	0
Cameron Murray	20	3	0	0	12
Mark Nicholls	15	0	0	0	0
Kodi Nikorima	12	0	10	0	20
Jaxson Paulo	18	6	0	0	24
Trent Peoples	2	0	0	0	0
Hame Sele	11	0	0	0	0
Blake Taaffe	10	2	30	0	68
Isaiah Tass	13	2	0	0	8
Tevita Tatola	23	4	0	0	16
Izaac Thompson	2	2	0	0	8
Cody Walker	24	12	0	0	48

== See also ==
- 2022 NRL pre-season results
- 2022 NRL season
- 2022 NRL season results
- 2022 NRL finals series
