= 2023 South Sydney Rabbitohs season =

Rugby team season

- NRL Rank: 9th
- 2023 record: Wins: 12; losses: 12

Team information
- CEO: Blake Solly
- Head Coach: Jason Demetriou
- Captain: Cameron Murray
- Stadium: Stadium Australia (8 games); Barlow Park; Optus Stadium; Sunshine Coast Stadium (1 game each)
- Avg. attendance: 19,734
- High attendance: 36,263 v Roosters (Rd 27)
- Low attendance: 8,378 v Dragons (Rd 15)

Top scorers
- Tries: Alex Johnston (21)
- Points: Latrell Mitchell (143)
← 2022	List of seasons	2024 →

The 2023 South Sydney Rabbitohs season was the 114th in the history of the club. Coached by Jason Demetriou and captained by Cameron Murray, they competed in the National Rugby League's 2023 Telstra Premiership but did not qualify for the finals.

South Sydney became the first team since the introduction of the top 8 finals system to miss the finals after leading the competition after eleven rounds.

== Squad ==
The playing squad and coaching staff of the South Sydney Rabbitohs for the 2023 NRL season.

South Sydney Rabbitohs 2023 squad
Top 30 NRL Squad - 2023 Season			Development List	Coaching staff
Jai Arrow – SR, LK, PR; Thomas Burgess – PR; Jed Cartwright – SR, CE; Michael Chee Kam – SR; Damien Cook – HK; Campbell Graham – CE; Siliva Havili – LK, HK; Dean Hawkins – HB; Jacob Host – SR; Lachlan Ilias – HB	Alex Johnston – WG; Terrell Kalo Kalo – FB; Josiah Karapani – CE; Liam Knight – PR, LK; Keaon Koloamatangi – SR, PR; Ben Lovett – SR; Peter Mamouzelos – HK; Taane Milne – CE, SR; Latrell Mitchell – FB; Shaquai Mitchell – PR	Davvy Moale – PR; Cameron Murray (c) – LK; Hame Sele – PR; Daniel Suluka-Fifita – PR; Blake Taaffe – FB, FE; Isaiah Tass – CE; Tevita Tatola – PR; Leon Te Hau – WG; Izaac Thompson – WG; Cody Walker (vc) – FE	Tallis Duncan – LK; Jye Gray – FE, FB; Richard Kennar – WG; Tyrone Munro – WG, FB	Head coach: Jason Demetriou; Assistant coaches: Sam Burgess; Ben Hornby; Legend: (c) Captain(s); (vc) Vice-captain(s); Updated: 8 February 2023; Source(s): Rabbitohs Squad

== Pre-season ==
Round 1: 10 February 2023	South Sydney Rabbitohs	28–30	Manly Warringah Sea Eagles	Gosford
20:00 AEDT (UTC+11:00)	Tries: Carr 4'; Teaupa 11', 20'; Taaffe 45'; Subloo 71'; Goals: Taaffe 4/5 5', 12', 21', 47'; Sin bin: Te Hau (yellow card) 67' to 77'	[Report Report]	Tries: Vaega 7', 30'; Toby 32', 55'; Fulton 35'; Brown 68'; Goals: Johns 3/6 31', 37', 69'	Stadium: Industree Group Stadium; Attendance: 9,807; Referee: Todd Smith

Round 2: 18 February 2023	St. George Illawarra Dragons	24–42	South Sydney Rabbitohs	Mudgee
15:30 AEDT (UTC+11:00)	Tries: Mbye 49'; Sullivan 58'; Feagai 65'; Liddle 76'; Goals: Lomax 3/3 51', 60', 66'; Sullivan 1/1 77'	[Report Report]	Tries: Burgess 6'; Walker 11', 62'; L. Mitchell 25'; Arrow 28'; Moale 45'; Gagai 73'; Goals: L. Mitchell 7/8 7', 12', 27', 30', 40 (pen)', 47', 63'	Stadium: Glen Willow Oval; Attendance: 8,317; Referee: Peter Gough

== Regular season ==
=== Ladder ===
2023 NRL season
Pos	Team	Pld	W	D	L	B	PF	PA	PD	Pts
1	Penrith Panthers (P)	24	18	0	6	3	645	312	+333	42
2	Brisbane Broncos	24	18	0	6	3	639	425	+214	42
3	Melbourne Storm	24	16	0	8	3	627	459	+168	38
4	New Zealand Warriors	24	16	0	8	3	572	448	+124	38
5	Newcastle Knights	24	14	1	9	3	626	451	+175	35
6	Cronulla-Sutherland Sharks	24	14	0	10	3	619	497	+122	34
7	Sydney Roosters	24	13	0	11	3	472	496	−24	32
8	Canberra Raiders	24	13	0	11	3	486	623	−137	32
9	South Sydney Rabbitohs	24	12	0	12	3	564	505	+59	30
10	Parramatta Eels	24	12	0	12	3	587	574	+13	30
11	North Queensland Cowboys	24	12	0	12	3	546	542	+4	30
12	Manly Warringah Sea Eagles	24	11	1	12	3	545	539	+6	29
13	Dolphins	24	9	0	15	3	520	631	−111	24
14	Gold Coast Titans	24	9	0	15	3	527	653	−126	24
15	Canterbury-Bankstown Bulldogs	24	7	0	17	3	438	769	−331	20
16	St. George Illawarra Dragons	24	5	0	19	3	474	673	−199	16
17	Wests Tigers	24	4	0	20	3	385	675	−290	14

=== Result by round ===
Round	1	2	3	4	5	6	7	8	9	10	11	12	13	14	15	16	17	18	19	20	21	22	23	24	25	26	27
Ground	A	A	A	H	H	A	A	H	A	N	H	H	H	A	A	–	H	A	H	–	H	A	H	H	A	–	H
Result	W	L	L	W	L	W	W	W	W	W	W	L	L	W	L	B	L	W	L	B	L	W	L	W	L	B	L
Position	4	6	10	8	13	10	5	4	3	2	1	2	5	3	4	4	8	7	8	8	9	6	8	8	8	8	9
Points	2	2	2	4	4	6	8	10	12	14	16	16	16	18	18	20	20	22	22	24	24	26	26	28	28	30	30

Updated to match(es) played on 2 September 2023. Source: National Rugby League
A = Away; H = Home; N = Neutral; B = Bye; W = Win; D = Draw; L = Loss

=== Matches ===
Round 1: 4 March 2023	Cronulla-Sutherland Sharks	18–27	South Sydney Rabbitohs	Sydney
19:35 AEDT (UTC+11:00)	Tries: Trindall 19'; Katoa 39'; Wilton 71'; Goals: Trindall 3/3 21', 40', 72'; Sin bin: Graham (yellow card) 66' to 76'	[Report Report]	Tries: Ilias 9'; Koloamatangi 32'; Graham 46', 65'; Goals: L. Mitchell 5/5 10', 34', 47', 58 (pen)', 67'; Field goals: L. Mitchell 79'	Stadium: PointsBet Stadium; Attendance: 12,757; Referee: Todd Smith

Round 2: 9 March 2023	Penrith Panthers	16–10	South Sydney Rabbitohs	Sydney
19:50 AEDT (UTC+11:00)	Tries: Crichton 3'; Tago 39'; To'o 52'; Goals: Crichton 1/1 40'; Cleary 1/3 47 (pen)'	[Report Report]	Tries: Johnston 66'; Tass 78'; Goals: L. Mitchell 1/2 78'	Stadium: BlueBet Stadium; Attendance: 16,906; Referee: Grant Atkins

Round 3: 17 March 2023	Sydney Roosters	20–18	South Sydney Rabbitohs	Sydney
20:05 AEDT (UTC+11:00)	Tries: Smith 33'; Tupou 37'; Paulo 45', 65'; Goals: Walker 2/4 39', 47'; Sin bin: Manu (yellow card) 76' to 80'	[Report Report]	Tries: Koloamatangi 7'; Johnston 12'; Thompson 78'; Goals: L. Mitchell 3/5 8', 40 (pen)', 79'; Sin bin: Chee-Kam (yellow card) 76' to 80'	Stadium: Allianz Stadium; Attendance: 36,639; Referee: Gerard Sutton

Round 4: 25 March 2023	South Sydney Rabbitohs	13–12	Manly Warringah Sea Eagles	Sydney
19:35 AEDT (UTC+11:00)	Tries: Walker 22', 49'; Goals: L. Mitchell 2/3 23', 67 (pen)' Field goals: Ilias 81'	[Report Report]	Tries: Olakau'atu 25'; Cherry-Evans 39'; Goals: Garrick 2/2 26', 40'	Stadium: Accor Stadium; Attendance: 18,379; Referee: Chris Sutton

Round 5: 31 March 2023	South Sydney Rabbitohs	10–18	Melbourne Storm	Sydney
20:05 AEDT (UTC+11:00)	Tries: Walker 10'; Graham 59'; Goals: L. Mitchell 1/2 11'	[Report Report]	Tries: King 6'; Warbrick 21'; Munster 43'; Goals: Meaney 3/3 8', 22', 44'	Stadium: Accor Stadium; Attendance: 11,239; Referee: Todd Smith

Round 6: 7 April 2023	Canterbury-Bankstown Bulldogs	16–50	South Sydney Rabbitohs	Sydney
16:05 AEST (UTC+10:00)	Tries: Averillo 3'; Burton 54', 72'; Goals: Burton 2/3 4', 56'; Sin bin: Preston (yellow card) 72' to 80'	[Report Report]	Tries: Murray 17'; L. Mitchell 31', 34', 66'; Host 38'; Walker 63'; Graham 68', 76', 78'; Goals: L. Mitchell 7/10 18', 28 (pen)', 33', 35', 39', 65', 67'	Stadium: Accor Stadium; Attendance: 35,211; Referee: Gerard Sutton

Round 7: 13 April 2023	Dolphins	14–36	South Sydney Rabbitohs	Brisbane
19:50 AEST (UTC+10:00)	Tries: Aitken 1'; Marshall-King 33'; Goals: Isaako 3/3 3', 28 (pen)', 35'; Sin bin: K. Bromwich (yellow card) 60' to 70'	[Report Report]	Tries: Graham 22', 44'; Walker 48'; Tass 62'; L. Mitchell 64'; Johnston 67'; Goals: L. Mitchell 6/7 23', 46', 50', 58 (pen)', 63', 65'	Stadium: Suncorp Stadium; Attendance: 23,280; Referee: Ashley Klein

Round 8: 20 April 2023	South Sydney Rabbitohs	20–18	Penrith Panthers	Sydney
19:50 AEST (UTC+10:00)	Tries: Cook 19'; L. Mitchell 56', 74'; Tass 78'; Goals: L. Mitchell 2/4 20', 75'	[Report Report]	Tries: Crichton 38', 65', 70'; Goals: Crichton 3/4 40', 47 (pen)', 71'	Stadium: Accor Stadium; Attendance: 19,574; Referee: Gerard Sutton

Round 9: 28 April 2023	Brisbane Broncos	6–32	South Sydney Rabbitohs	Brisbane
20:00 AEST (UTC+10:00)	Tries: Arthars 11'; Goals: Reynolds 1/2 4 (pen)' Sin bin: Farnworth (yellow card) 45' to 55'	[Report Report]	Tries: Graham 6', 35', 48'; L. Mitchell 42', 67'; Walker 57'; Goals: L. Mitchell 4/6 8', 36', 44', 58'; Sin bin: Murray (yellow card) 4' to 14'	Stadium: Suncorp Stadium; Attendance: 40,102; Referee: Ashley Klein

Round 10: 6 May 2023	Melbourne Storm	12–28	South Sydney Rabbitohs	Brisbane
19:45 AEST (UTC+10:00)	Tries: Smith 35'; Garlick 75'; Goals: Meaney 2/2 36', 76'	[Report Report]	Tries: Walker 5'; Host 18'; Johnston 46', 51'; Tass 66'; Goals: L. Mitchell 4/6 6', 20', 53', 68'	Stadium: Suncorp Stadium; Attendance: 50,183; Referee: Adam Gee

Round 11: 13 May 2023	South Sydney Rabbitohs	20–0	Wests Tigers	Sydney
15:00 AEST (UTC+10:00)	Tries: Milne 24', 72'; L. Mitchell 74'; Goals: L. Mitchell 4/4 26', 51 (pen)', 73', 76'	[Report Report]		Stadium: Accor Stadium; Attendance: 21,013; Referee: Liam Kennedy

Round 12: 19 May 2023	South Sydney Rabbitohs	16–36	Parramatta Eels	Sydney
20:00 AEST (UTC+10:00)	Tries: Johnston 7', 36'; Graham 47'; Goals: L. Mitchell 2/3 38', 48'	[Report Report]	Tries: Russell 2'; Simonsson 26', 57'; Cartwright 52'; Brown 71'; Penisini 75'; Goals: Moses 6/6 3', 28', 54', 58', 73', 76'	Stadium: Allianz Stadium; Attendance: 27,432; Referee: Ashley Klein

Round 13: 27 May 2023	South Sydney Rabbitohs	26–33	Canberra Raiders	Sydney
19:35 AEST (UTC+10:00)	Tries: Cartwright 6'; Johnston 28', 50'; Tass 45'; Cook 68'; Goals: Taaffe 3/5 47', 52', 69'	[Report Report]	Tries: Horsburgh 13'; Hopoate 17', 22', 73'; Starling 58'; Goals: Croker 6/7 15', 23', 34 (pen)', 60', 75', 78 (pen)' Field goals: Fogarty 79'	Stadium: Accor Stadium; Attendance: 12,382; Referee: Grant Atkins

Round 14: 3 June 2023	Gold Coast Titans	28–46	South Sydney Rabbitohs	Gold Coast
17:30 AEST (UTC+10:00)	Tries: I. Fa'asuamaleaui 6'; Randall 9'; Khan-Pereira 21'; S. Fifita 39'; T. Fa'asuamaleaui 78'; Goals: Boyd 4/5 7', 10', 22', 78'	[Report Report]	Tries: Koloamatangi 13'; Johnston 16', 34', 47'; Graham 43'; Walker 55'; Kennar 72'; Sele 75'; Goals: Taaffe 7/9 14', 36', 44', 56', 70 (pen)', 73', 76'	Stadium: Cbus Super Stadium; Attendance: 18,736; Referee: Liam Kennedy

Round 15: 10 June 2023	St. George Illawarra Dragons	36–30	South Sydney Rabbitohs	Sydney
15:00 AEST (UTC+10:00)	Tries: B. Hunt 15'; Ravalawa 19'; Liddle 50'; Su'a 60'; M. Molo 66'; J. Hunt 72'; Goals: Lomax 6/7 17', 32 (pen)', 51', 61', 68', 73'	[Report Report]	Tries: Kennar 8'; Koloamatangi 36'; Tass 53'; Host 76'; Ilias 77'; Graham 78'; Goals: Taaffe 3/6 54', 77', 77'	Stadium: Netstrata Jubilee Stadium; Attendance: 17,357; Referee: Ben Cummins

Round 16 (Bye for South Sydney Rabbitohs)

Round 17: 25 June 2023	South Sydney Rabbitohs	6–31	North Queensland Cowboys	Sydney
16:05 AEST (UTC+10:00)	Tries: Ilias 58'; Goals: Taaffe 1/1 60'	[Report Report]	Tries: Taulagi 30'; Holmes 44', 46'; Finefeuiaki 69'; Dearden 77'; Goals: Holmes 5/6 45', 48', 63 (pen)', 71', 77'; Field goals: Drinkwater 39'	Stadium: Accor Stadium; Attendance: 11,262; Referee: Gerard Sutton

Round 18: 30 June 2023	New Zealand Warriors	6–28	South Sydney Rabbitohs	Auckland, New Zealand
20:00 NZST (UTC+12:00)	Tries: Montoya 15'; Goals: Johnson 1/1 17'; Sin bin: Fonua-Blake (yellow card) 33' to 43'	[Report Report]	Tries: Johnston 22', 48'; Murray 36'; Munro 66'; Taaffe 76'; Goals: Taaffe 3/5 37', 67', 77'	Stadium: Mount Smart Stadium; Attendance: 22,612; Referee: Ashley Klein

Round 19: 8 July 2023	South Sydney Rabbitohs	32–36	Canterbury-Bankstown Bulldogs	Sydney
19:35 AEST (UTC+10:00)	Tries: Burgess 4'; Munro 18', 76'; Taaffe 58', 66'; Duncan 77'; Goals: Taaffe 3/4 6', 20', 77'; Hawkins 1/2 67'; Sin bin: Milne (yellow card) 9' to 19'	[Report Report]	Tries: Wilson 7', 12', 70'; Mahoney 14'; Kiraz 25'; Quai-Ward 55'; Goals: Burton 6/7 8', 13', 16', 27', 63 (pen)', 72'	Stadium: Accor Stadium; Attendance: 16,166; Referee: Liam Kennedy

Round 20 (Bye for South Sydney Rabbitohs)

Round 21: 21 July 2023	South Sydney Rabbitohs	20–36	Brisbane Broncos	Sunshine Coast
20:00 AEST (UTC+10:00)	Tries: Johnston 5'; Graham 40'; Tass 68'; Goals: Taaffe 4/4 7', 13 (pen)', 40', 69'	[Report Report]	Tries: Staggs 5', 61'; Cobbo 23'; Walsh 50'; Willison 57'; Reynolds 74'; Goals: Reynolds 6/6 11', 24', 51', 58', 62', 75'; Sin bin: Taupau (yellow card) 12' to 22'; Arthars (yellow card) 68' to 78'	Stadium: Sunshine Coast Stadium; Attendance: 8,931; Referee: Ashley Klein

Round 22: 28 July 2023	Wests Tigers	18–32	South Sydney Rabbitohs	Tamworth
18:00 AEST (UTC+10:00)	Tries: Koroisau 8'; Papali'i 43'; Pole 56'; Goals: Koroisau 2/2 10', 57'; Brooks 1/1 44'	[Report Report]	Tries: Johnston 1', 22', 65'; Tass 17'; Koloamatangi 26'; Murray 75'; Goals: L. Mitchell 4/6 2', 27', 66', 76'	Stadium: Scully Park; Attendance: 10,453; Referee: Ziggy Przeklasa-Adamski

Round 23: 5 August 2023	South Sydney Rabbitohs	16–26	Cronulla-Sutherland Sharks	Perth
17:35 AWST (UTC+8:00)	Tries: Johnston 62'; Ilias 64'; Tass 73'; Goals: L. Mitchell 2/3 63', 65'; Sin bin: Burgess (yellow card) 75' to 80'	[Report Report]	Tries: Hiroti 17'; Katoa 23'; Trindall 44', 57'; Goals: Hynes 5/5 18', 24', 32 (pen)', 45', 58'	Stadium: Optus Stadium; Attendance: 45,814; Referee: Todd Smith

Round 24: 12 August 2023	South Sydney Rabbitohs	26–14	St. George Illawarra Dragons	Cairns
15:00 AEST (UTC+10:00)	Tries: Johnston 10', 71'; Graham 42'; Walker 50'; Goals: Mitchell 5/5 11', 18 (pen)', 43', 51', 72'	[Report Report]	Tries: Ravalawa 19'; Hunt 44'; Sloan 65'; Goals: Hunt 1/3 46'	Stadium: Barlow Park; Attendance: 8,378; Referee: Ben Cummins

Round 25: 20 August 2023	Newcastle Knights	29–10	South Sydney Rabbitohs	Newcastle
18:00 AEST (UTC+10:00)	Tries: Marzhew 5', 11', 36'; Saifiti 55'; Clune 59'; Best 69'; Goals: Ponga 2/6 57', 70'; Field goals: Clune 77'	[Report Report]	Tries: Cook 42'; S. Mitchell 65'; Goals: L. Mitchell 1/2 66'; Sin bin: L. Mitchell (yellow card) 78' to 80'	Stadium: McDonald Jones Stadium; Attendance: 29,018; Referee: Grant Atkins

Round 26 (Bye for South Sydney Rabbitohs)

Round 27: 1 September 2023	South Sydney Rabbitohs	12–26	Sydney Roosters	Sydney
20:00 AEST (UTC+10:00)	Tries: Murray 19'; Chee-Kam 55'; Goals: Ilias 2/2 20', 57'	[Report Report]	Tries: Allan 19'; Pauga 37'; Tedesco 44'; Smith 69'; Walker 74'; Goals: Sua'ali'i 2/5 46', 75'	Stadium: Accor Stadium; Attendance: 35,263; Referee: Adam Gee
