= 2021 South Sydney Rabbitohs season =

Team information
- CEO: Blake Solly
- Head Coach: Wayne Bennett (First Grade)
- Captain: Adam Reynolds
- Stadium: Stadium Australia
← 2020	List of seasons	2022 →

The 2021 season is the 112th in the history of the South Sydney Rabbitohs. Coached by Wayne Bennett and captained by Adam Reynolds, they compete in the National Rugby League's 2021 Telstra Premiership.

== Standings ==
Pos	Team	Pld	W	D	L	B	PF	PA	PD	Pts	
1	Melbourne Storm (M)	24	21	0	3	1	815	316	+499	44	Advance to finals series
2	Penrith Panthers (P)	24	21	0	3	1	676	286	+390	44	Advance to finals series
3	South Sydney Rabbitohs	24	20	0	4	1	775	453	+322	42	Advance to finals series
4	Manly-Warringah Sea Eagles	24	16	0	8	1	744	492	+252	34	Advance to finals series
5	Sydney Roosters	24	16	0	8	1	630	489	+141	34	Advance to finals series
6	Parramatta Eels	24	15	0	9	1	566	457	+109	32	Advance to finals series
7	Newcastle Knights	24	12	0	12	1	428	571	−143	26	Advance to finals series
8	Gold Coast Titans	24	10	0	14	1	580	583	−3	22	Advance to finals series
9	Cronulla-Sutherland Sharks	24	10	0	14	1	520	556	−36	22	
10	Canberra Raiders	24	10	0	14	1	481	578	−97	22	
11	St. George Illawarra Dragons	24	8	0	16	1	474	616	−142	18	
12	New Zealand Warriors	24	8	0	16	1	453	624	−171	18	
13	Wests Tigers	24	8	0	16	1	500	714	−214	18	
14	Brisbane Broncos	24	7	0	17	1	446	695	−249	16	
15	North Queensland Cowboys	24	7	0	17	1	460	748	−288	16	
16	Canterbury-Bankstown Bulldogs (W)	24	3	0	21	1	340	710	−370	8	

Updated to match(es) played on 5 September 2021. Source: 2021 NRL Ladder
(M) Minor premiers; (P) Premiers; (W) Wooden spoon

== Fixtures ==
=== Regular season ===
Round	Home	Score	Away	Match information		
Round	Home	Score	Away	Date and time (local)	Venue	Attendance
1	Melbourne Storm	26 – 18	South Sydney Rabbitohs	Thursday, 11 March, 8:05 pm	AAMI Park	11,812
2	Manly Warringah Sea Eagles	12 – 26	South Sydney Rabbitohs	Saturday, 20 March, 5:30 pm	Lottoland	3,218
3	South Sydney Rabbitohs	26 – 16	Sydney Roosters	Friday, 26 March, 8:05 pm	Stadium Australia	22,838
4	Canterbury-Bankstown Bulldogs	0 – 38	South Sydney Rabbitohs	Friday, 2 April, 4:05 pm	Stadium Australia	23,340
5	South Sydney Rabbitohs	35 – 6	Brisbane Broncos	Thursday, 8 April, 7:50 pm	Stadium Australia	9,142
6	South Sydney Rabbitohs	18 – 14	Wests Tigers	Saturday, 17 April, 5:30 pm	Stadium Australia	16,134
7	Gold Coast Titans	30 – 40	South Sydney Rabbitohs	Friday, 23 April, 6:00 pm	Cbus Super Stadium	17,383
8	Canberra Raiders	20 – 34	South Sydney Rabbitohs	Thursday, 29 April, 7:50 pm	GIO Stadium	14,260
9	South Sydney Rabbitohs	0 – 50	Melbourne Storm	Thursday, 6 May, 7:50 pm	Stadium Australia	7,501
10	Cronulla-Sutherland Sharks	22 – 32	South Sydney Rabbitohs	Saturday, 15 May, 5:30 pm	Suncorp Stadium	42,821
11	South Sydney Rabbitohs	12 – 56	Penrith Panthers	Sunday, 23 May, 2:00 pm	Apex Oval	10,824
12	South Sydney Rabbitohs	38 – 20	Parramatta Eels	Saturday, 29 May, 5:30 pm	Stadium Australia	20,743
13	Bye Round					
14	South Sydney Rabbitohs	24–10	Newcastle Knights	Saturday, 12 June, 5:30 pm	Stadium Australia	12,156
15	Brisbane Broncos	0 – 46	South Sydney Rabbitohs	Thursday, 17 June, 7:50 pm	Suncorp Stadium	19,713
16	Wests Tigers	22 – 38	South Sydney Rabbitohs	Sunday, 4 July, 4:05 pm	Leichhardt Oval	0
17	South Sydney Rabbitohs	46 – 18	North Queensland Cowboys	Friday, 9 July, 7:55 pm	McDonald Jones Stadium	3,127
18	South Sydney Rabbitohs	32 – 24	Canterbury-Bankstown Bulldogs	Sunday, 18 July, 6:15 pm	Cbus Super Stadium	2,979
19	South Sydney Rabbitohs	60 – 22	New Zealand Warriors	Saturday, 24 July, 3:00 pm	Sunshine Coast Stadium	7,569
20	St George Illawarra Dragons	14 – 50	South Sydney Rabbitohs	Saturday, 31 July, 3:00 pm	Suncorp Stadium	0
21	Parramatta Eels	12 – 40	South Sydney Rabbitohs	Friday, 6 August, 7:55 pm	Cbus Super Stadium	0
22	South Sydney Rabbitohs	36 – 6	Gold Coast Titans	Saturday, 14 August, 3:00 pm	Cbus Super Stadium	4,117
23	Penrith Panthers	25 – 12	South Sydney Rabbitohs	Friday, 20 August, 7:55 pm	Suncorp Stadium	8,848
24	Sydney Roosters	12 – 54	South Sydney Rabbitohs	Friday, 27 August, 7:55 pm	Suncorp Stadium	5,136
25	South Sydney Rabbitohs	20 – 16	St George Illawarra Dragons	Saturday, 4 September, 7:35 pm	Sunshine Coast Stadium	3,295
Legend: Win Loss Draw Bye

=== Finals Series ===
Round	Home	Score	Away	Match information		
Round	Home	Score	Away	Date and time (local)	Venue	Attendance
Qualifying Final	Penrith Panthers	10 - 16	South Sydney Rabbitohs	Saturday 11 September, 7:50pm	Queensland Country Bank Stadium	18,244
Semi Final	Bye Week					
Preliminary Final	Manly-Warringah Sea Eagles	16 - 36	South Sydney Rabbitohs	Friday 24 September, 8:05pm	Suncorp Stadium	26,249
Grand Final	Penrith Panthers	14 - 12	South Sydney Rabbitohs	Sunday 3 October, 7:30pm	Suncorp Stadium	39,322
Legend: Win Loss Draw Bye

== Squad movement ==
=== Players ===
==== Gains ====
Player	Signed from	Until	Reference
Jai Arrow	Gold Coast Titans	2024	
Jacob Host	St. George Illawarra Dragons	2023	
Taane Milne	New Zealand Warriors	2022	
Josh Mansour	Penrith Panthers	2022	
Benji Marshall	Wests Tigers	2021	

==== Losses ====
Player	2021 club	Reference
Bryson Goodwin	Cronulla-Sutherland Sharks	
Bayley Sironen	New Zealand Warriors	
Jack Johns	Newcastle Knights	
James Roberts	Wests Tigers	
Cory Denniss	Released	
Kurt Dillon	Released	
Ky Rodwell	Released	
Tom Amone	Released	
Ethan Lowe	Retirement	

==== Re-signings ====
Player	Signed until	Reference
Cameron Murray	2025	
Campbell Graham	2024	
Liam Knight	2023	
Hame Sele	2023	
Lachlan Ilias	2022	
Alex Johnston	2022	
Jaxson Paulo	2022	
Cody Walker	2022	
Latrell Mitchell	2021	
Jaydn Su'A	2021	

=== Coaching staff ===
Name	Position	Team	Reference
Wayne Bennett	Head coach	First Grade (NRL)	
Jason Demetriou	Assistant coach	First Grade (NRL)	
Joe O'Callaghan	Head coach	Under-21s (Jersey Flegg Cup)	
Sam Burgess	Head coach	Under-19s (S.G. Ball Cup)	
John Sutton	Assistant coach	Under-19s (S.G. Ball Cup)	
Beau Falloon	Head coach	Under-17s (Harold Matthews Cup)	

== Pre-season ==
Date	Time	Opponent	Venue	Score	Tries	Goals	Notes	References
27 February 2020		St George Illawarra Dragons	Glen Willow Stadium, Mudgee	–			38th Charity Shield	
Legend: Win Loss Draw
