= Jason Demetriou =

Jason Demetriou may refer to:

- Jason Demetriou (rugby league) (born 1976), Australian born Greek Cyptiot rugby league footballer and coach
- Jason Demetriou (footballer) (born 1987), English-born Cypriot association footballer
