= Blake Taaffe =

Australian rugby league footballer

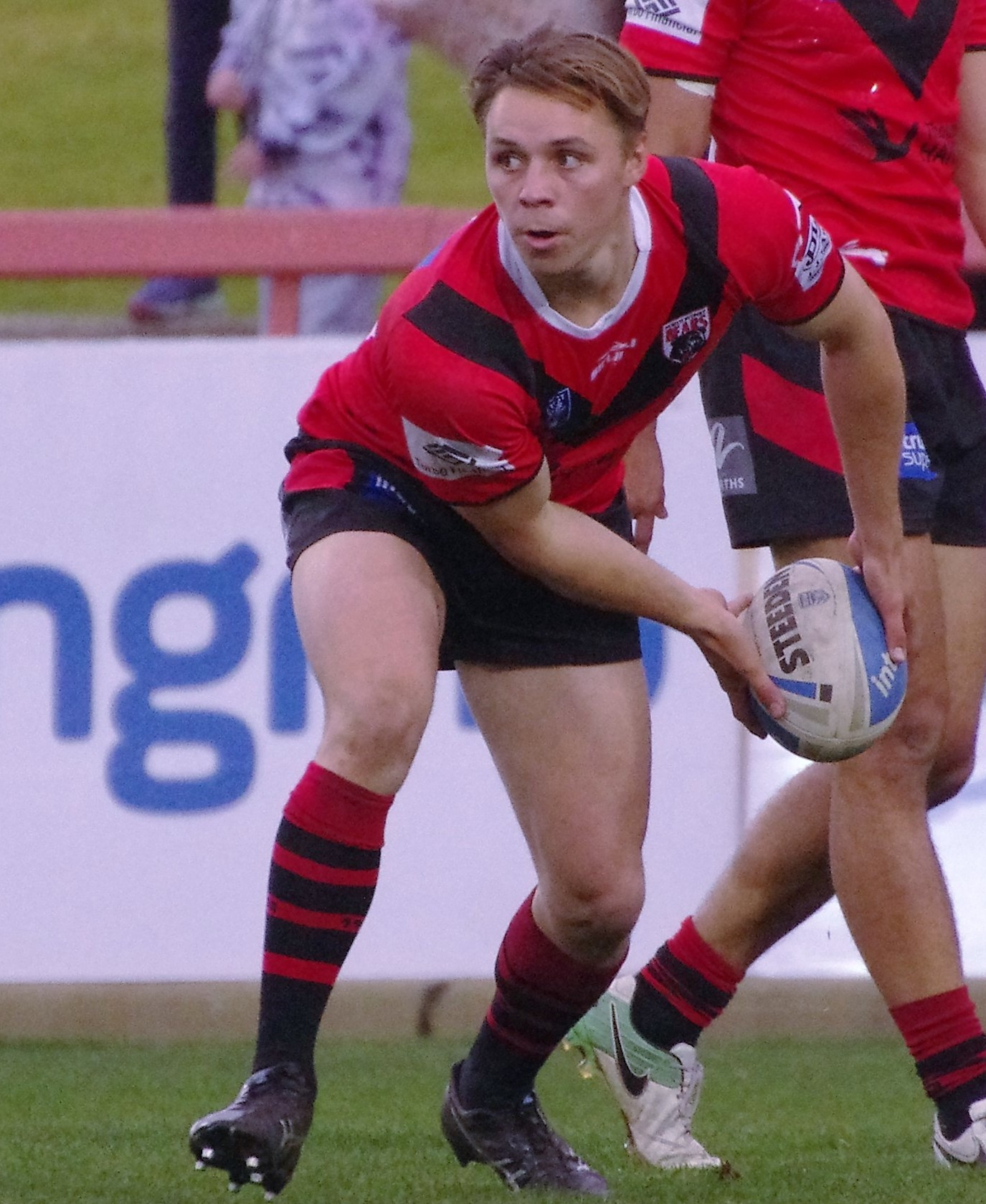

Personal information
- Full name: Blake Wayne Taaffe
- Born: 21 April 1999 (age 27) Sydney, New South Wales, Australia
- Height: 5 ft 10 in (1.79 m)
- Weight: 13 st 5 lb (85 kg)

Playing information
- Position: Fullback, Scrum-half
Club
Years	Team	Pld	T	G	FG	P
2021–23	South Sydney	31	6	60	0	144
2024–25	Canterbury Bulldogs	12	2	0	0	8
2026–	Castleford Tigers	2	1	0	0	4
	Total	45	9	60	0	156
- Source: As of 15 February 2026

Blake Taaffe (born 21 April 1999) is an Australian professional rugby league footballer who plays as a fullback for the Castleford Tigers in the Super League.

He has previously played for the South Sydney Rabbitohs and the Canterbury-Bankstown Bulldogs in the National Rugby League.

== Early life ==
Taaffe was educated at Tuggerah Lakes Secondary College.

== Playing career ==
=== 2021 ===
In round 15 of the 2021 NRL season, Taaffe made his first grade debut for South Sydney against the Brisbane Broncos in a 46–0 victory.

Taaffe played a total of eight games for South Sydney in the 2021 NRL season including the club's 2021 NRL Grand Final defeat against Penrith.

=== 2022 ===
Taaffe played a total of ten games for South Sydney in the 2022 NRL season. Taaffe did not feature in any of South Sydney's finals matches as the club reached the preliminary final before losing to Penrith.

=== 2023 ===
In round 19 of the 2023 NRL season, Taaffe scored two tries for South Sydney in their 36-32 loss against Canterbury.

On 31 July, Taaffe signed a two-year deal to join Canterbury starting in 2024.

On 24 September, Taaffe played for South Sydney in their 2023 NSW Cup grand final victory over North Sydney. Taaffe was named as man of the match for his performance in the final.

=== 2024 ===
In round 1 of the 2024 NRL season, Taaffe made his club debut for Canterbury in their 28-6 loss against arch-rivals Parramatta.

Taaffe played a total of nine games for Canterbury in the 2024 NRL season as they qualified for the finals finishing 6th on the table.

=== 2025 ===
On 25 August, Taaffe signed a three-year deal to join the Castleford Tigers from 2026.

Taaffe was limited to only four games with Canterbury in the 2025 NRL season and did not feature in their finals campaign.

=== 2026 ===
Taaffe was assigned Castleford's number 1 shirt for the 2026 season. He scored a try on debut on 8 February against Doncaster in the Challenge Cup. In the opening round of Super League against Wigan, Taaffe suffered a knee injury in the second half; he was later confirmed to have suffered a ruptured ACL, thus ruling him out for the entire remainder of the year.

== Statistics ==
Appearances and points in all competitions by year
Club	Season	Tier	App	T	G	DG	Pts
South Sydney Rabbitohs	2021	NRL	8	1	6	0	16
South Sydney Rabbitohs	2022	NRL	10	2	30	0	68
South Sydney Rabbitohs	2023	NRL	13	3	24	0	60
South Sydney Rabbitohs	Total		31	6	60	0	144
Canterbury-Bankstown Bulldogs	2024	NRL	8	2	0	0	8
Canterbury-Bankstown Bulldogs	2025	NRL	4	0	0	0	0
Canterbury-Bankstown Bulldogs	Total		12	2	0	0	8
Castleford Tigers	2026	Super League	2	1	0	0	4
Career total			45	9	60	0	156

As of match played 15 February 2026
