= Trent Peoples =

Australian rugby league footballer (b.1998)

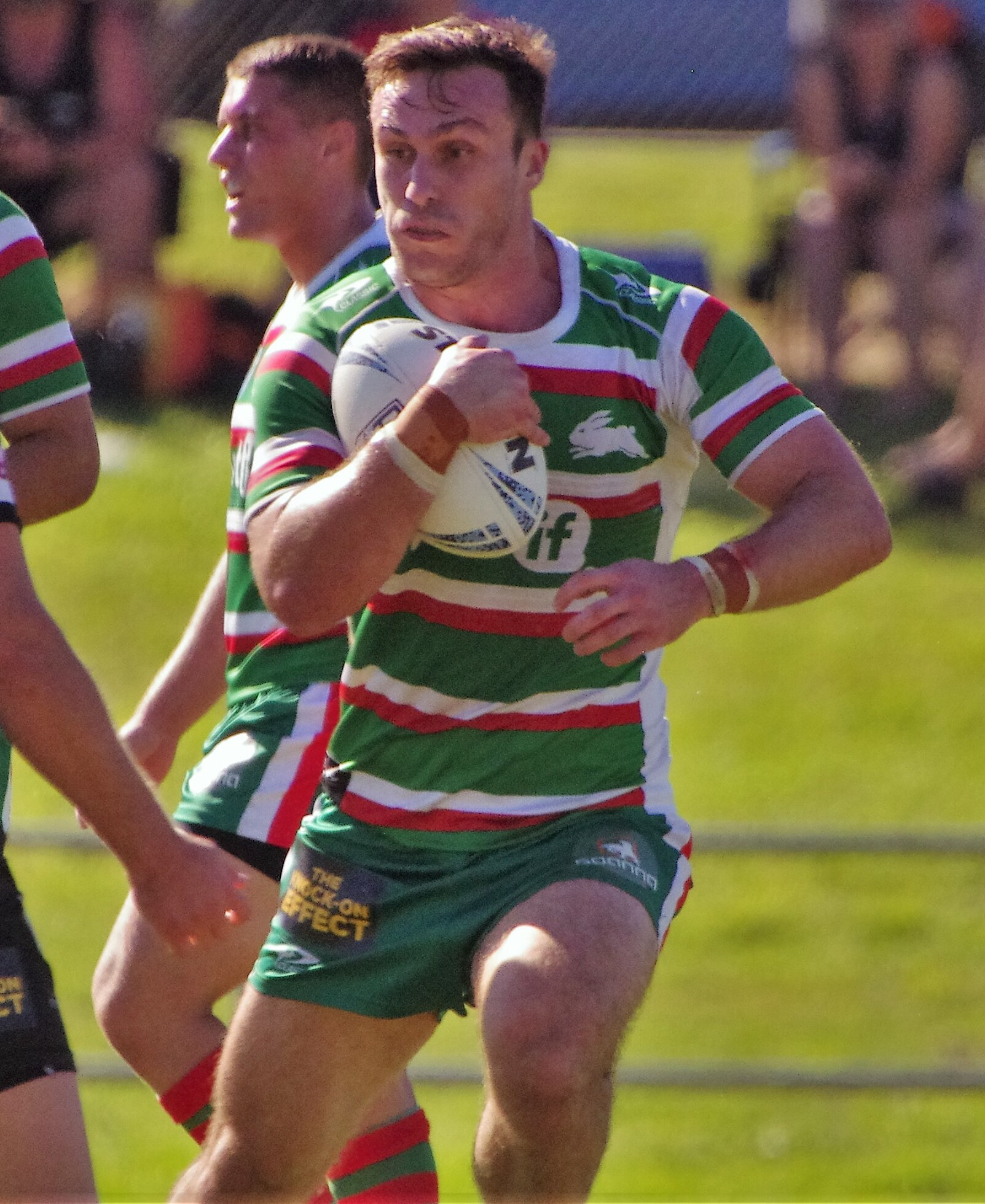

Personal information
- Full name: Trent Peoples
- Born: 22 June 1998 (age 27); Campbelltown, New South Wales, Australia
- Height: 188 cm (6 ft 2 in)
- Weight: 96 kg (15 st 2 lb)

Playing information
- Position: Second-row
Representative
Years	Team	Pld	T	G	FG	P
2022–	South Sydney	2	0	0	0	0
- Source: As of 23 May 2022

Trent Peoples (born 22 June 1998) is an Australian rugby league footballer who plays as a second-row forward for the South Sydney Rabbitohs in the NRL.

== Background ==
Peoples was born in Campbelltown, New South Wales, Australia. He completed his schooling at St. Gregory's College, Campbelltown.

He played his junior rugby league with the Campbelltown Collegians.

== Career ==
Peoples was named South Sydney's NSW Cup player of the year in 2021. Peoples made his first grade debut for South Sydney (first grade player number 1179) in his side's 32−12 loss to the Brisbane Broncos at Stadium Australia in round 9 of the 2022 NRL season. On 26 April 2023, Peoples announced he would be taking a hiatus from rugby league after failing to recover from a serious leg injury at the end of 2022.
