= Isaiah Tass =

Australian rugby league footballer (born 1999)

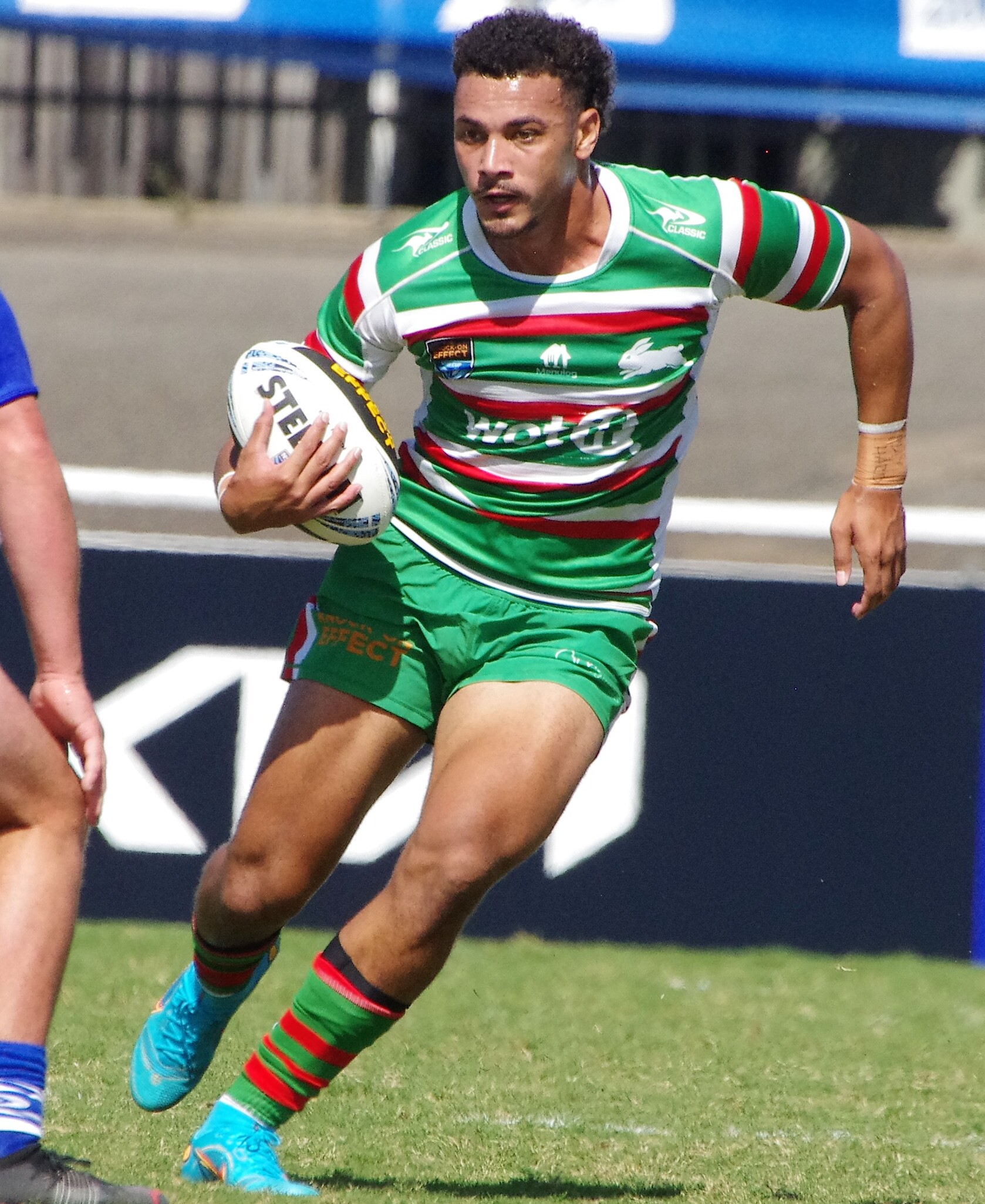

Personal information
- Full name: Isaiah Tass
- Born: 19 August 1999 (age 27) Mackay, Queensland, Australia
- Height: 185 cm (6 ft 1 in)
- Weight: 94 kg (14 st 11 lb)

Playing information
- Position: Centre, Wing
Club
Years	Team	Pld	T	G	FG	P
2022–	South Sydney	70	18	2	0	76
Representative
Years	Team	Pld	T	G	FG	P
2023	Indigenous All Stars	1	0	0	0	0
- Source: As of 16 October 2026

Isaiah Tass (born 19 August 1999) a rugby league footballer who plays as a centre or Winger for the South Sydney Rabbitohs in the NRL.

== Background ==
Tass was born in Mackay, Queensland and played his junior rugby league with the Norths Devils. He is of Indigenous Australian descent from the Yuwibara people and Vanuatuan descent.

== Playing career ==
=== 2022 ===
Tass made his first grade debut in round 6 of the 2022 NRL season for South Sydney against the Canterbury-Bankstown Bulldogs scoring a try during Souths 36-16 victory. Tass played 16 games for South Sydney in the 2022 NRL season including all three of the clubs finals matches as they reached the preliminary final for a fifth straight season. Souths would lose in the preliminary final to eventual premiers Penrith 32-12.

=== 2023 ===
In round 8 of the 2023 NRL season, Tass scored the winning try in South Sydney's 20-18 victory over Penrith. Tass played a total of 23 games for Souths in the 2023 NRL season as the club finished 9th on the table and missed the finals.

=== 2024 ===
On 7 May, it was announced that Tass would be ruled out from playing indefinitely after suffering a freak ankle injury at training. It was reported that Tass would require surgery and could potentially be out for up to three months. On 30 September, it was announced that Tass had re-signed with the club on a three year extension.

=== 2025 ===
Tass played 23 matches for South Sydney in the 2025 NRL season which saw the club finish 14th on the table. On 3 October, it was reported that Tass had injured his knee while playing at a rugby league carnival in Queensland, he is expect to miss a majority of the 2026 season.

== Statistics ==
Year	Team	Games	Tries	Pts
2022	South Sydney Rabbitohs	16	3	12
2023	South Sydney Rabbitohs	23	9	36
2024	South Sydney Rabbitohs	8	1	4
2025	South Sydney Rabbitohs	23	5	20
2026	South Sydney Rabbitohs	0	0	0
2027	South Sydney Rabbitohs	0	0	0
	Totals	70	18	72
