= Izaac Tu'itupou =

New Zealand rugby league footballer

Izaac Tui'itupou
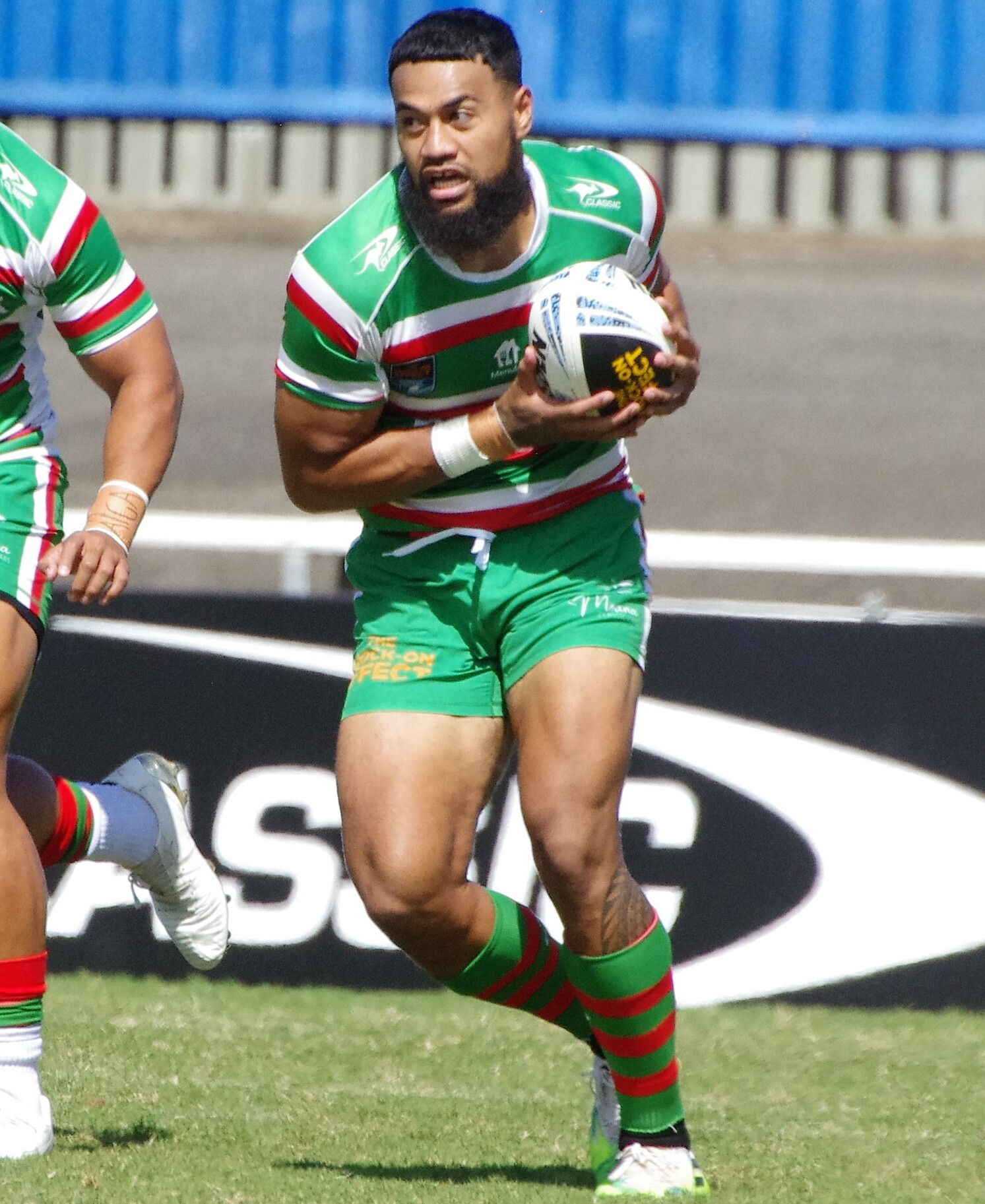

Personal information
- Full name: Izaac Tui'itupou Thompson
- Born: 3 October 1996 (age 29)
- Height: 192 cm (6 ft 4 in)
- Weight: 102 kg (16 st 1 lb)

Playing information
- Position: Wing, Centre
Club
Years	Team	Pld	T	G	FG	P
2022–24	South Sydney	13	6	0	0	24
2025	Wests Tigers	1	0	0	0	0
	Total	14	6	0	0	24
- Source: As of 26 July 2025

Izaac Tui'itupou Thompson (born 3 October 1996) is a New Zealand professional rugby league footballer who last played as a winger for the Wests Tigers in the NRL.

== Playing career ==
=== 2022 ===
Thompson made his first grade debut in round 21 of the 2022 NRL season for South Sydney against the New Zealand Warriors, scoring a try.

=== 2023 ===
Thompson played a total of seven games for Souths in the 2023 NRL season as the club finished 9th on the table and missed the finals. On 24 September, Thompson played for South Sydney in their 2023 NSW Cup grand final victory over North Sydney.

=== 2024 ===
Thompson played a total of five matches in the 2024 NRL season. Souths confirmed at the end of their round 27 match that Thompson would depart of the club at the end of the season. On 26 November, it was announced that Thompson had secured a train and trial deal with the Canberra Raiders.

=== 2025 ===
On 2 April, Thompson had signed a train and trial contract with the Wests Tigers. After he was released from the Wests Tigers, Thompson signed with Lakes United Seagulls.

== Statistics ==
Year	Team	Games	Tries	Pts
2022	South Sydney Rabbitohs	1	2	8
2023	South Sydney Rabbitohs	7	1	4
2024	South Sydney Rabbitohs	5	3	12
2025	Wests Tigers	1		
	Totals	14	6	24
