= Cameron Murray (rugby league) =

Australia international rugby league footballer

Cam Murray
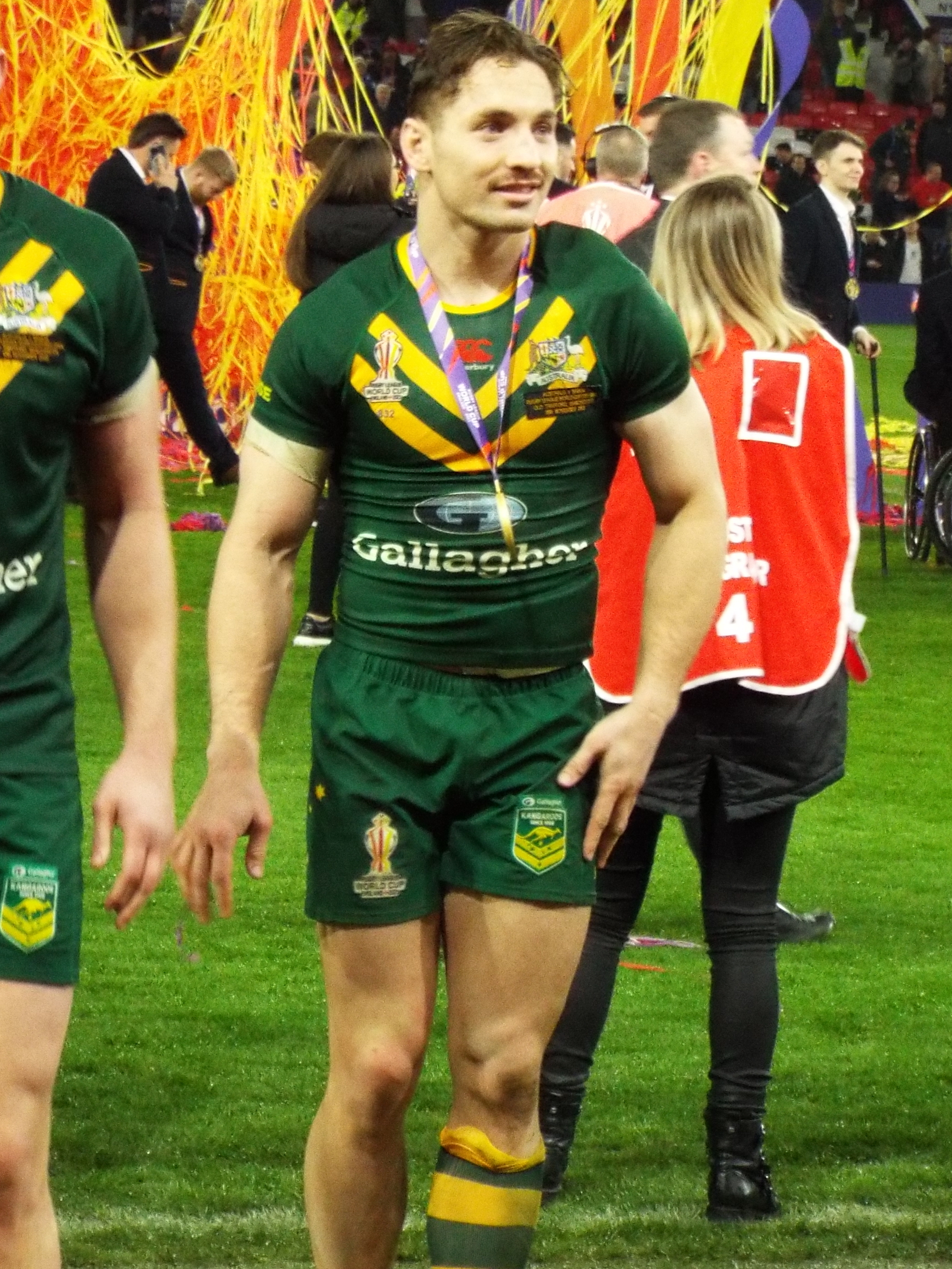

Personal information
- Full name: Cameron Murray
- Born: 16 January 1998 (age 28) Sydney, New South Wales, Australia
- Height: 184 cm (6 ft 0 in)
- Weight: 96 kg (15 st 2 lb)

Playing information
- Position: Lock, Second-row
Club
Years	Team	Pld	T	G	FG	P
2017–	South Sydney	182	40	0	0	160
Representative
Years	Team	Pld	T	G	FG	P
2019–26	New South Wales	18	2	0	0	8
2019–	Australia	14	7	0	0	28
2023	Prime Minister's XIII	1	0	0	0	0
- Source: As of 16 November 2026

Cameron Murray (born 16 January 1998) is an Australian professional rugby league footballer who plays as a lock forward and captains the South Sydney Rabbitohs in the NRL.

He has also represented New South Wales and Australia at international level.

== Early life ==
Murray was born in Sydney, New South Wales, Australia.

Murray played his junior rugby league for the Mascot Jets, before being signed by the South Sydney Rabbitohs. He attended Newington College, sitting his HSC in 2015. Academically, Murray performed well, achieving 1st place in the college in Earth and Environment Science, with a Band 6 (raw mark of 91). He was captain of Newington's GPS Championship Winning 1st XV Rugby team that same year. In his final year at the college he turned down captaincy of the Under-18 NSW State of Origin side in favour of playing for his school.

Cameron's father, Corey Murray, made 12 appearances for South Sydney in the early 1990s.

== Playing career ==
=== 2016 ===
In October 2015, Murray re-signed with South Sydney on a four-year contract until the end of 2019. Late in 2015, he played for the Australian Schoolboys. In 2016, he played for the South Sydney Rabbitohs' NYC team. He also featured for the Rabbitohs' Intrust Super Premiership NSW team, North Sydney Bears in 2016, playing a total of six games and scoring one try.

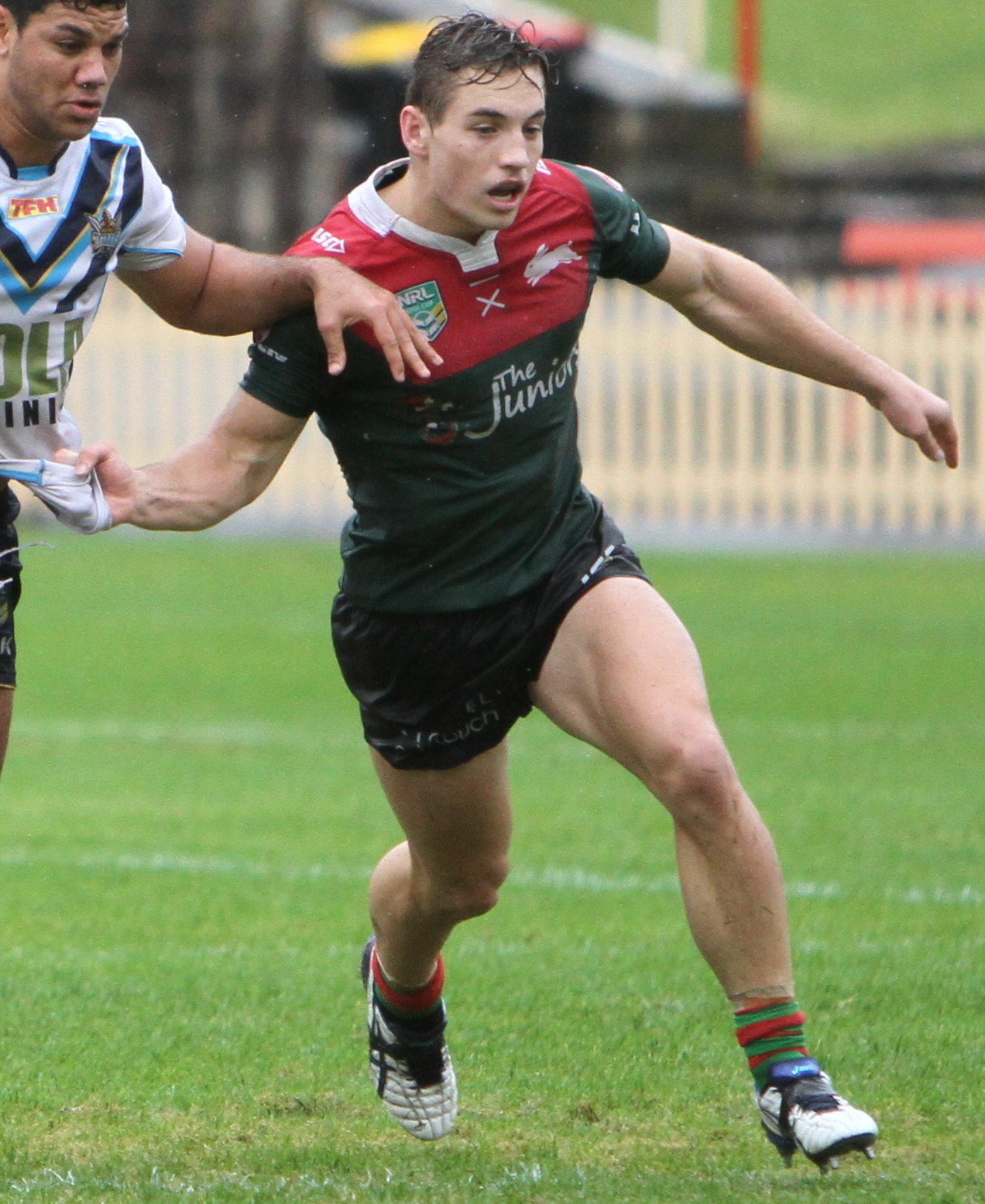
Murray playing for the Rabbitohs in 2016

On June 22, Murray captained the NSW Blues Under-18 side as they defeated Queensland 26-0 at Suncorp Stadium.

=== 2017 ===
Murray started off 2017 by playing in the Intrust Super Premiership NSW for North Sydney.

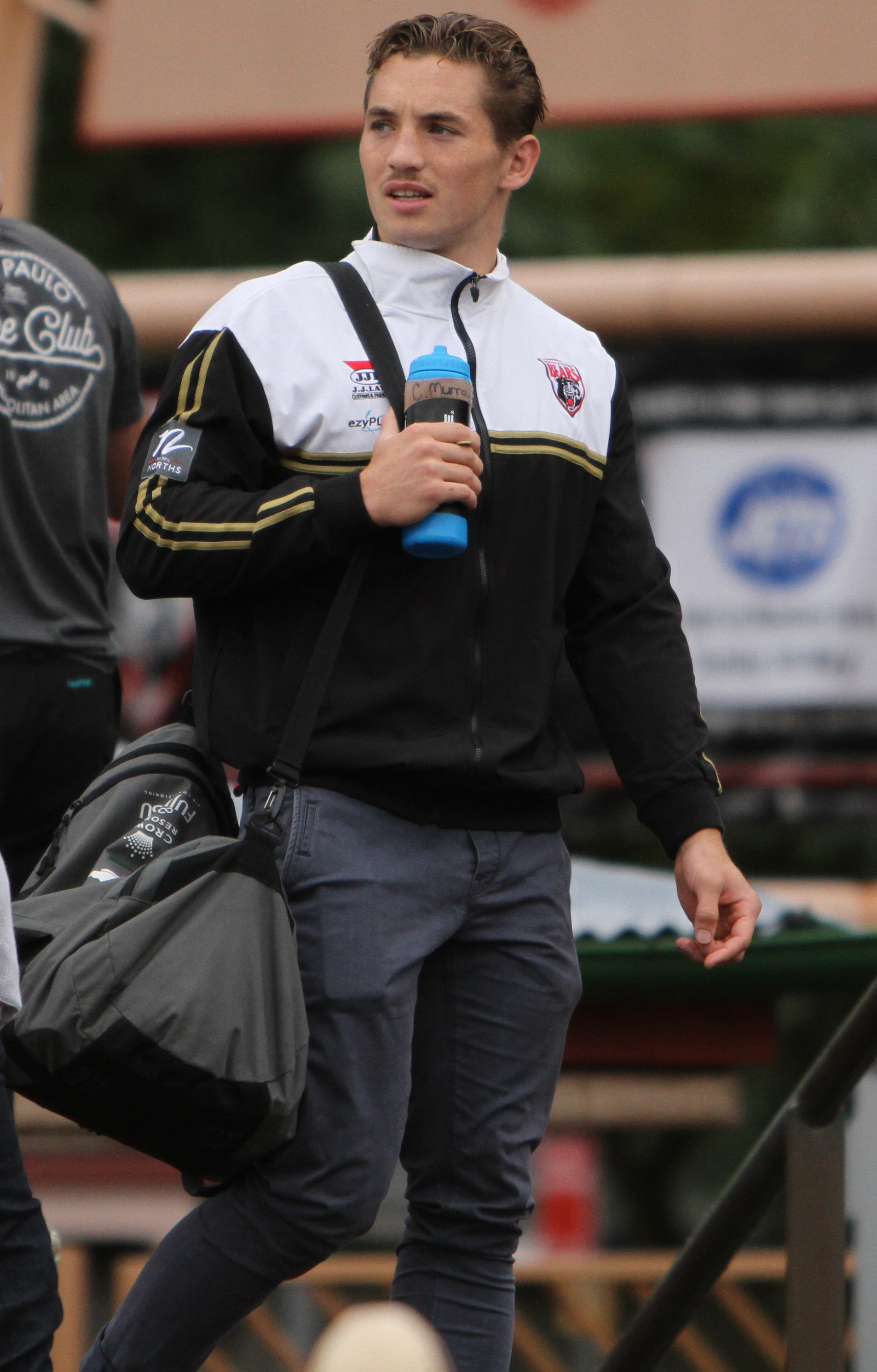
Murray with the North Sydney Bears in 2017

In May, he was selected to start at lock for the Junior Kangaroos team to play the Junior Kiwis.

In round 8 of the 2017 NRL season, he made his NRL debut for South Sydney off the bench against the Brisbane Broncos in round 8. Murray was named captain of the NSW Blues U20 side in May and playing in the 2nd row, as NSW defeated Queensland 30-16.

Murray went on to play 9 NRL matches in 2017, scoring his maiden try in round 24 against the New Zealand Warriors. He was named the club's rookie of the year at season's end.

=== 2018 ===
Murray was key part of the South Sydney side which finished third in 2018, often starting the game on the bench. In week one of the finals against the Melbourne Storm, Murray scored what seemed to be the game winning try, before a late try and field goal to the Storm handed Souths a 29–28 loss.

In week 2 of the finals against the St. George-Illawarra Dragons, Murray stripped the ball from Leeson Ah Mau with South Sydney trailing by a point with just over three minutes remaining. Adam Reynolds then kicked two field goals as South Sydney won 13-12. South Sydney were knocked out in the preliminary final, losing 12-4 to the Sydney Roosters.

Despite coming off the bench for majority of the season, Murray was regarded as one of South Sydney's best performers and was lauded for his quick play-the-ball speed setting up attacking opportunities for his teammates.

=== 2019 ===
In 2019, Murray was named as starting lock, with new coach Wayne Bennett moving captain Sam Burgess to the second row to accommodate for Murray. He started off 2019 in strong form as Souths won 10 of their first 11 games. Murray earned his first representative honour as he was selected to play for the New South Wales Blues by coach Brad Fittler. He played in all three matches for NSW in the 2019 State of Origin series as the Blues won the series 2–1.

At the end of the 2019 regular season, Souths finished third on the table and qualified for the finals. In the elimination final against the Manly-Warringah Sea Eagles, Murray scored two crucial tries as Souths won the game 32–26 at ANZ Stadium. Murray featured in the club's preliminary final match against the Canberra Raiders the following week which Souths lost 16–10 at Canberra Stadium.

On 2 October, Murray was named as the 2019 Dally M lock of the year at the Dally M Awards ceremony. In addition, Murray received the Rabbitohs Jack Rayner's Players' Player award as judged by his teammates.

On 7 October, Murray was named in the Australian side for the Oceania Cup fixtures and made his Test debut on 2 November against Tonga, who won 16-12 to defeat Australia for the first time.

=== 2020 ===
In the 2020 NRL season, Murray was moved by Bennett to the starting 2nd row position to replace John Sutton and Burgess, who both retired before the season began. Murray often played the opening minutes of the match on the edge before shifting back to his traditional lock spot, in an attempt to increase his output by reducing his workload in the opening exchanges of the match. This move was short-lived however, with Murray reverting to the number 13 jersey by round 5.

Murray played 23 games for Souths in 2020 as the club reached their third straight preliminary final but fell short of a grand final appearance once again, losing 20-16 to the Penrith Panthers.

Murray was selected for NSW for the 2020 State of Origin series commencing in November, however he suffered a hamstring injury after playing just four minutes of the opening game in Adelaide and was then ruled out for the remainder of the series.

=== 2021 ===
In the round 8 match against the Canberra Raiders, Murray suffered a grade two syndesmosis injury and was ruled out for four weeks. Despite this, he was selected for game one of the 2021 State of Origin series. Murray played all three matches for NSW, starting in the second row, as the Blues claimed a 2–1 series win.

Murray played a total of 20 games for South Sydney in 2021, including the club's grand final defeat against the Panthers. On 18 December 2021, Murray was named captain of the South Sydney club by new coach Jason Demetriou after the departure of Adam Reynolds to Brisbane.

=== 2022 ===
On 29 May, Murray was selected by New South Wales to play in game one of the 2022 State of Origin series. Murray played in all three games as New South Wales lost the series 2-1.

Murray played 23 games for South Sydney in the 2022 NRL season including all three of the clubs finals matches as they reached the preliminary final for a fifth straight season. Souths would lose in the preliminary final to eventual premiers Penrith 32-12.

In October, he was named in the Australia squad for the 2021 Rugby League World Cup. Murray played for Australia in their 2021 Rugby League World Cup final victory over Samoa, scoring a try during Australia's 30-10 victory.

In November, he was named in the 2021 RLWC Team of the Tournament.

=== 2023 ===
On 22 May, Murray was selected by New South Wales for game one of the 2023 State of Origin series. Murray played in all three games as New South Wales lost the series 2-1. On 31 August, Murray signed a five-year contract extension to remain at South Sydney until the end of 2028. Murray played a total of 21 games for Souths in the 2023 NRL season as the club finished 9th on the table and missed the finals.

Murray was selected in the Australian side for the 2023 Pacific Championships, and scored a try in both of Australia's pre-final matches to equal a record seven tries in six consecutive tests by an Australian forward set by Ron Coote in 1968-69.

=== 2024 ===
Following South Sydney's round 9 loss against Penrith, it was announced that Murray would be ruled out for 6-8 weeks with a hip flexor injury. On 16 June, Murray was selected by New South Wales for game two of the 2024 State of Origin series after only playing one match following his return from injury for South Sydney. In game three of the 2024 State of Origin series, Murray became the first player to be sin binned from the interchange bench when he jumped into an altercation between other players that had spilled over the field of play. Murray was later suspended for two games over the incident. Murray played 14 games for South Sydney in the 2024 NRL season as the club endured a difficult campaign finishing second bottom on the table.

=== 2025 ===
On 19 February during a training session Murray was sent for scans after suffering a suspected Achilles tendon rupture. Murray missed almost the entire 2025 NRL season but returned for the clubs final game of the year against arch-rivals the Sydney Roosters.

=== 2026 ===
In May, Murray was named by New South Wales for game one in the 2026 State of Origin series. Murray played all three games for New South Wales as the blues won the series 2-1. Murray played 20 matches for South Sydney in the 2026 NRL season as the club finished 6th on the table and qualified for the finals.

== Honours ==
Individual

- Dally M Lock of the Year: 2019
- RLWC Team of the Tournament: 2021
- Harry Sunderland Medal: 2023

South Sydney Rabbitohs

- NRL Premiership Runners-Up: 2021

NSW Blues

- State of Origin: 2019, 2021, 2024, 2026

Australia

- World Cup: 2021, 2026

== Statistics ==
Year	Team	Games	Tries	Pts
2017	South Sydney Rabbitohs	9	1	4
2018	South Sydney Rabbitohs	25	2	8
2019	South Sydney Rabbitohs	26	12	48
2020	South Sydney Rabbitohs	23	5	20
2021	South Sydney Rabbitohs	20	5	20
2022	South Sydney Rabbitohs	23	4	16
2023	South Sydney Rabbitohs	21	4	16
2024	South Sydney Rabbitohs	14	2	8
2025	South Sydney Rabbitohs	1	0	0
2026	South Sydney Rabbitohs	6	1	4
2027	South Sydney Rabbitohs			
	Totals	168	36	144
