= Shaquai Mitchell =

Australian rugby league footballer

Shaq Mitchell
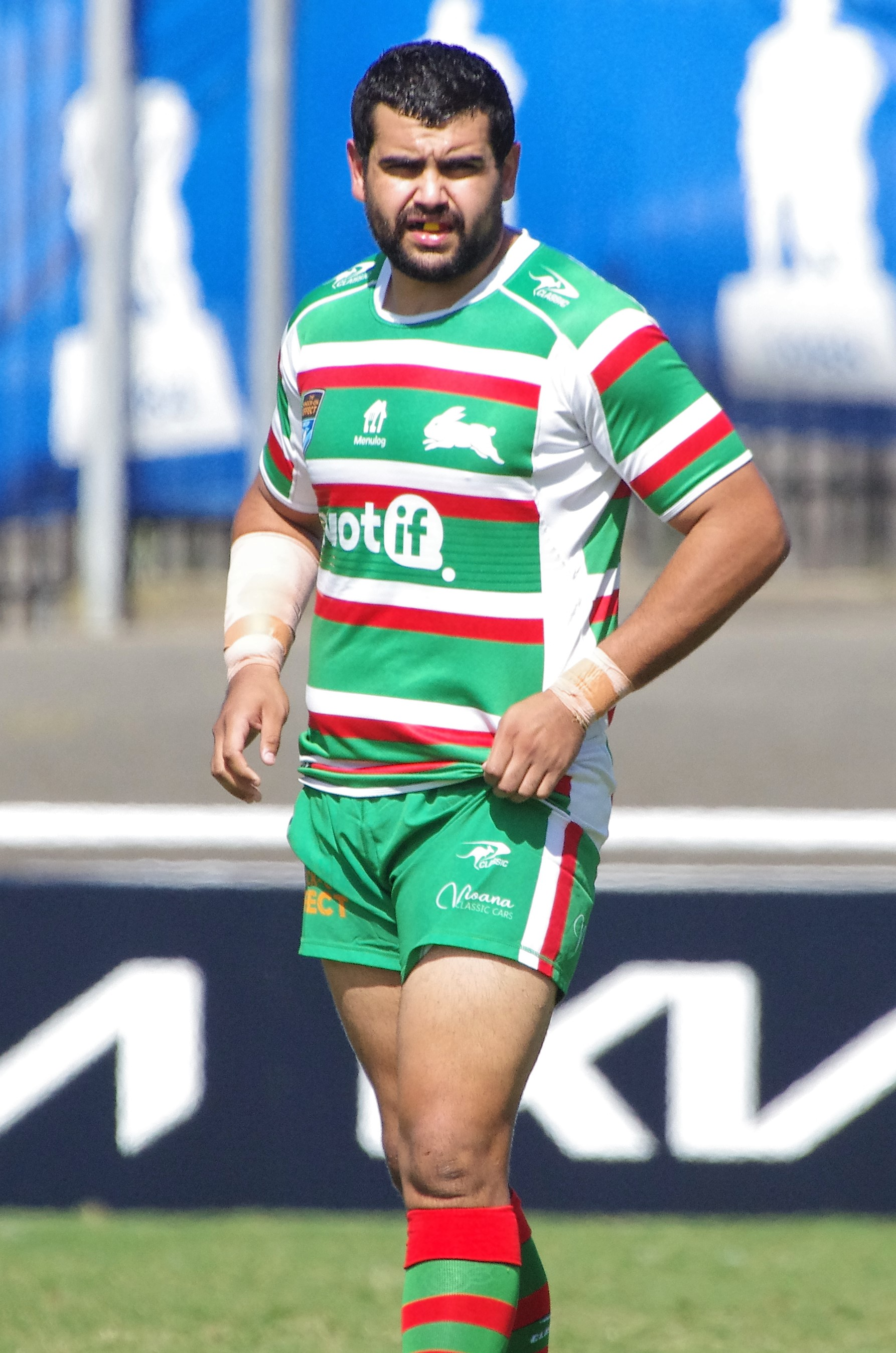

Personal information
- Full name: Shaquai Mitchell
- Born: 19 March 1996 (age 30) Taree, New South Wales, Australia
- Height: 192 cm (6 ft 4 in)
- Weight: 116 kg (18 st 4 lb)

Playing information
- Position: Prop, Second-row
Club
Years	Team	Pld	T	G	FG	P
2022–25	South Sydney	20	1	0	0	4
Representative
Years	Team	Pld	T	G	FG	P
2022–25	Indigenous All Stars	4	1	0	0	0
- As of 16 September 2025
- Relatives: Latrell Mitchell (brother)

Shaquai Mitchell (born 19 March 1996) is an Australian professional rugby league footballer who plays as a prop for the Tweed Heads Seagulls in the Queensland Cup.

== Background ==
Mitchell was part of the Sydney Roosters under 20s system where he won an SG Ball title in 2014 with his younger brother Latrell. Mitchell played for the Wyong Roos in the NSW Cup, with a playing weight of 175 kg in 2018. In 2022, Mitchell dropped over 25 kg and trained with the South Sydney Rabbitohs with the goal of playing in the NRL, following his Indigenous All Stars debut.

He is of Indigenous Australian descent from the Birrbay and Wiradjuri people.

== Playing career ==
Mitchell made his debut for the Indigenous All Stars in the 2022 All Stars match. In round 8 of the 2022 NRL season, he made his first grade debut for South Sydney against Manly-Warringah at the Central Coast Stadium which ended in a 40–22 victory.

In round 8 2022, Mitchell made his NRL debut for South Sydney against the Manly-Warringah Sea Eagles at Central Coast Stadium.

=== 2023 ===
Mitchell played eleven games for South Sydney in the 2023 NRL season as they finished 9th on the table and missed the finals. On 24 September 2023, Mitchell played for South Sydney in their 2023 NSW Cup grand final victory over North Sydney.

=== 2024 ===
Mitchell played six matches for South Sydney in the 2024 NRL season as they finished 16th on the table. On 23 September 2024, Mitchell signed a one-year extension with the club.

=== 2025 ===
Mitchell played no matches for South Sydney's first grade side in the 2025 NRL season. He would instead play for the clubs reserve grade side in the NSW Cup as they finished with the Wooden Spoon. In September, it was announced that Mitchell would be departing the South Sydney club after not being offered a new contract. Following his Bunnies exit Mitchell signed with QLD Cup side Tweed Heads Seagulls.

== Statistics ==
Year	Team	Games	Tries	Pts
2022	South Sydney Rabbitohs	3		
2023	South Sydney Rabbitohs	11	1	4
2024	South Sydney Rabbitohs	6		
	Totals	20	1	4
