= Jai Arrow =

Australian rugby league footballer (born 1995)

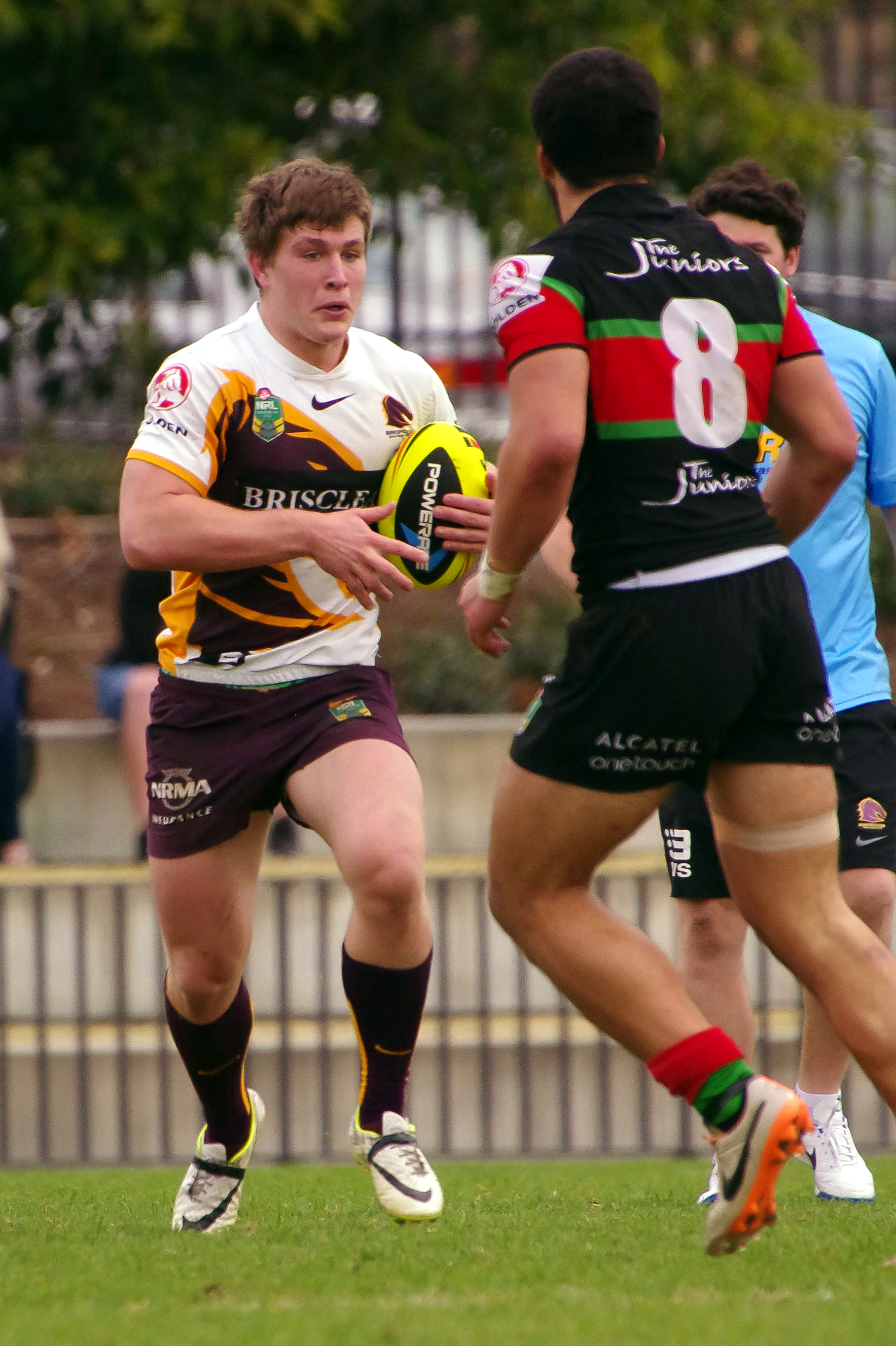
- Arrow in August 2014

Personal information
- Born: 12 July 1995 (age 31) Fairfield, Queensland, Australia
- Height: 189 cm (6 ft 2 in)
- Weight: 101 kg (15 st 13 lb)

Playing information
- Position: Lock, Second-row, Prop
Club
Years	Team	Pld	T	G	FG	P
2016–17	Brisbane Broncos	24	1	0	0	4
2018–20	Gold Coast Titans	56	4	0	0	16
2021–26	South Sydney	100	7	1	0	30
	Total	180	12	1	0	50
Representative
Years	Team	Pld	T	G	FG	P
2016	Queensland Residents	1	0	0	0	0
2018–23	Queensland	12	0	0	0	0
2019	Prime Minister's XIII	1	0	0	0	0
2019	Australia 9s	2	1	0	0	4
- Source: As of 4 September 2026

Jai Arrow (born 12 July 1995) is an Australian former professional rugby league footballer who played as a lock, second-row and prop forward for the South Sydney Rabbitohs in the National Rugby League (NRL).

He previously played for the Brisbane Broncos and Gold Coast Titans in the NRL. He has represented the Prime Minister's XIII and the Queensland Maroons in the State of Origin series. Arrow is known for highlighting the realities and raising awareness of motor neurone disease (MND) after announcing his retirement from the NRL following his diagnosis in 2026.

== Early life and education ==
Arrow was born in Fairfield in Queensland.

He played his junior rugby league for Palm Beach State Primary winning the Metropolitan Cup. He attended Keebra Park State High School in Southport, Queensland. In 2016, he made his NRL debut with the Brisbane Broncos.

== Playing career ==
=== Early career ===
From 2012 to 2015 Arrow played for the Brisbane Broncos' National Youth Competition team. In August 2012, he played for the Australian Schoolboys. Towards the end of the 2014 season, he re-signed with the Broncos on a 3-year contract. In 2015, he captained the Broncos' NYC side. On 2 May 2015, he played for the Junior Kangaroos against Junior Kiwis. On 8 July 2015, he played for the Queensland under-20s team against the New South Wales under-20s team. On 14 September 2015, he was named at lock in the 2015 NYC Team of the Year.

=== 2016 ===
In 2016 Arrow graduated to the Broncos' Queensland Cup team, Norths Devils. On 8 May, he played for the Queensland Residents against the New South Wales Residents. In round 10 of the 2016 NRL season, he made his NRL debut for the Broncos against the Manly Warringah Sea Eagles. In round 25 of 2016 NRL season, Arrow scored his first NRL try for the Broncos in the 26–16 win over the Melbourne Storm at AAMI Park.

=== 2017 ===
In August he signed a three-year contract with the Gold Coast Titans starting in 2018. He played 10 matches for Brisbane in the 2017 NRL season.

=== 2018 ===
In round 1 Arrow made his debut for the Gold Coast against the Canberra Raiders in the 30–28 win at Robina Stadium. In round 5 of the 2018 NRL season, Arrow scored his first 2 club tries for the Titans in a 32–20 win over the Manly Warringah Sea Eagles at Marley Brown Oval. Arrow had also made his Origin debut in a series that was won by New South Wales.

=== 2019 ===
Arrow made a total of 17 appearances for the Gold Coast in the 2019 NRL season as the club endured a horror year on the field finishing last.

On 30 September Arrow was named a squad member for the Australian PM's XIII side. On 7 October, Arrow was named in the Australian side for the 2019 Rugby League World Cup 9s. On 24 December, Arrow signed a $3.2 million, four-year contract to play for South Sydney starting in 2021.

=== 2020 ===
Arrow played 18 games for the Gold Coast in the 2020 NRL season as the club finished ninth on the table and missed the finals.

=== 2021 ===
In round 1 of the 2021 NRL season he made his club debut for South Sydney in an 18–26 loss against Melbourne at AAMI Park.

In round 10 he scored his first try for South Sydney in a 32–22 victory over Cronulla-Sutherland. Arrow played a total of 23 games for South Sydney in the 2021 NRL season including the club's 2021 NRL Grand Final defeat against Penrith. Arrow was taken off in the first half of the game after being hit in a high tackle by Penrith's Viliame Kikau. Arrow took no further part in the second half of the game after failing a head injury assessment.

=== 2022 ===
Arrow played 26 games for South Sydney in the 2022 NRL season including all three of the club's finals matches as they reached the preliminary final for a fifth straight season. Souths would lose in the preliminary final to eventual premiers Penrith 32–12.

=== 2023 ===
Arrow played a total of 14 games in the 2023 NRL season as South Sydney finished 9th on the table and missed the finals.

=== 2024 ===
On 12 March it was revealed that Arrow would be ruled out for an indefinite period after injuring his rotator cuff in South Sydney's round 1 loss against Manly. Arrow only managed to make 11 appearances for South Sydney in the 2024 NRL season as the club finished second last on the table.

=== 2025 ===
Arrow played every game for South Sydney in the 2025 NRL season which saw the club finish 14th on the table. At the end of the season Jai was voted South Sydney's best player for the year, winning his first George Piggins medal.

=== 2026 ===
On 20 May 2026 Arrow announced his official immediate retirement from the NRL following a diagnosis of motor neurone disease (MND), after initially seeking treatment for a shoulder injury at the back end of the 2025 season.

During round 15 of the NRL season the Rabbitohs wore a special 'white out' strip in honour of Arrow and named him as player 23 on their bench for the match. Arrow rang the legacy bell prior to the match beginning. During the month of July, players across the league would celebrate a try with a bow and arrow gesture in honour of Arrow. On 30 July 2026, the Titans announced a jersey for Arrow would be worn during round 26. On 25 August, the NRL had granted the Rabbitohs special permission to allow Arrow to be in the starting team for the final two games of the season which would allow Arrow to reach 100 Rabbitohs games. Arrow was named as captain and led the Rabbitohs out in their Round 26 game against the Gold Coast Titans. He was awarded the Provan-Summons Medal during the Dally M Awards before the 2026 NRL Grand Final and simultaneously it was announced that Arrow would do a lap of Stadium Australia while a selection of Australian musicians perform Gerry and the Pacemakers' song and Liverpool FC anthem You'll Never Walk Alone before the Grand final would be played.

== Statistics ==
Year	Team	Games	Tries	Goals	Pts
2016	Brisbane Broncos	12	1		4
2017	Brisbane Broncos	12			
2018	Gold Coast Titans	21	3		12
2019	Gold Coast Titans	17	1		4
2020	Gold Coast Titans	18			
2021	South Sydney Rabbitohs	23	2		8
2022	South Sydney Rabbitohs	26	2		8
2023	South Sydney Rabbitohs	14			
2024	South Sydney Rabbitohs	11	1	1	6
2025	South Sydney Rabbitohs	24	2		8
2026	South Sydney Rabbitohs	2			
	Totals	180	12	1	50

== Personal life ==
Arrow was diagnosed with motor neurone disease in May 2026. In July, Arrow married Berina Colakovic.

On 25 August 2026 South Sydney Rabbitohs agreed with their final two regular season opponents, Gold Coast Titans and Sydney Roosters, and with the NRL that Arrow would start the final two games to take his Rabbitohs career to 100 NRL games. Arrow started for the kick-off and was then imminently replaced.

=== Controversies ===
In November 2020 Arrow was fined for contrary conduct after slamming New South Wales captain James Tedesco, who was concussed, to the ground during a 2020 State of Origin series match. Arrow later apologised, stating he was unaware of Tedesco's condition at the time.

On 7 July 2021 Arrow was fined $35,000 by the NRL and suspended from playing in game 3 of the 2021 State of Origin series for Queensland after breaking the code's strict COVID-19 bio security protocols. It is alleged that Arrow brought "an unregistered guest" later revealed to be a woman into the team hotel.

Arrow's dog, an American Staffordshire Terrier, was euthanised in August 2022 after multiple attacks on other dogs, including the fatal mauling of a greyhound. It had previously been declared a "dangerous dog" by Waverley Council. Arrow unsuccessfully applied to the Supreme Court of New South Wales to halt the dog's euthanasia. In October 2025, the owner of the greyhound lodged a personal injury lawsuit against Arrow, stating that he had been diagnosed with post-traumatic stress disorder as a result of the incident.
