= Liam Knight =

Australian rugby league footballer (born 1995)

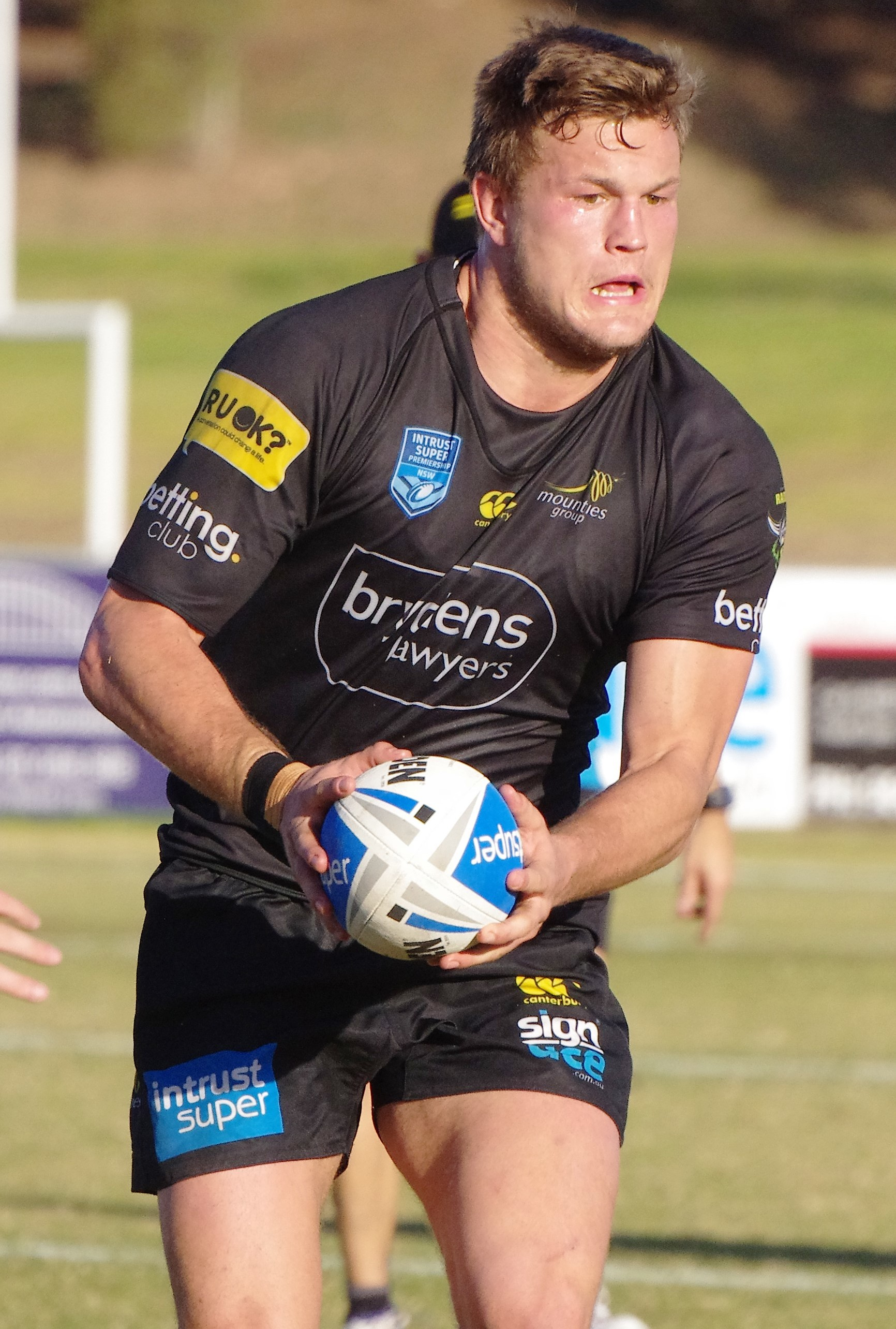

Personal information
- Born: 15 January 1995 (age 31) Alice Springs, Northern Territory, Australia
- Height: 6 ft 4 in (1.94 m)
- Weight: 16 st 10 lb (106 kg)

Playing information
- Position: Prop, Loose forward
Club
Years	Team	Pld	T	G	FG	P
2016	Manly Sea Eagles	1	0	0	0	0
2017–18	Canberra Raiders	9	1	0	0	4
2019–23	South Sydney	66	3	0	0	12
2023–24	Canterbury Bulldogs	7	1	0	0	4
2025–26	Hull FC	22	0	0	0	0
	Total	105	5	0	0	20
- Source: As of 20 November 2026
- Partner: Danika Mason

Liam Knight (born 15 January 1995) is an Australian rugby league footballer who plays as a prop or loose forward for North Sydney Bears in the NSW Cup.

He previously played for Hull FC in the Super League and the South Sydney Rabbitohs, Manly Warringah Sea Eagles and the Canberra Raiders in the National Rugby League (NRL), plus Cessnock Goannas in the Newcastle Rugby League..

== Background ==
Knight was born in Alice Springs, Northern Territory, Australia and moved to New South Wales at a young age.

He played his junior rugby league for The Entrance Tigers and Berkeley Vale Panthers. He was then signed by the Manly Warringah Sea Eagles.

== Playing career ==
=== Early career ===
From 2013 to 2015, Knight played for the Manly Warringah Sea Eagles' NYC team. On 8 July 2015, he played for the New South Wales under-20s team against the Queensland under-20s team.

=== 2016 ===
In 2016, Knight graduated to the Sea Eagles' Intrust Super Premiership NSW team. In March, he re-signed with the Manly club on a one-year contract. In Round 15 of the 2016 NRL season, he made his NRL debut for the Manly side against the Gold Coast Titans. In September, he was released from the final year of his Manly contract to take up a three-year contract with the Sydney Roosters starting in 2017.

=== 2017 ===
In June, Knight was released from his Sydney Roosters contract to join the Canberra Raiders, effective immediately on a contract until the end of 2019.

=== 2018 ===
In round 3 of the 2018 NRL season, he made his debut for Canberra in the 19-20 loss to the New Zealand Warriors at Canberra Stadium. In round 15 of the 2018 NRL season against the West Tigers, Knight scored his first NRL try in Canberra's 48-12 win at Campbelltown Stadium.

=== 2019 ===
Knight made his debut for South Sydney in round 1 of the 2019 NRL season against rivals the Sydney Roosters at the Sydney Cricket Ground. He made a total of 23 appearances for Souths in 2019 as the club finished third on the table and qualified for the finals. He played in all three finals games for Souths as the club reached the preliminary final but were defeated by his former club Canberra 16-10 at Canberra Stadium.

=== 2020 ===
In week 2 of the NRL 2020 finals series, Knight played his 50th NRL game scoring a try in a 38-24 victory against Parramatta. He played a total of 19 games for Souths in the 2020 NRL season including all three of the club's finals matches.

=== 2021 ===
Knight played 11 games for South Sydney in the 2021 NRL season. He did not feature in South Sydney's finals campaign or their 2021 NRL Grand Final loss to Penrith.

=== 2022 ===
Knight played eight games for South Sydney in the 2022 NRL season but did not feature in the clubs finals campaign as they reached the preliminary final before losing to Penrith.

=== 2023 ===
On 24 July, Knight was granted a release from his contract with South Sydney and signed with the Canterbury-Bankstown Bulldogs for the remainder of the season and 2024.

=== 2024 ===
Knight only played two matches with Canterbury in the 2024 NRL season. On 24 December, it was announced that he had been released by the club.

=== 2025 ===
On 3 March, Hull F.C. announced that they had signed Knight for the 2025 season. He made his début coming off the bench for Hull F.C. on 6 March against Leigh. At the 2025 Magic Weekend, he was given a straight red card for a professional foul during the clubs upset loss against Huddersfield. Knight played 17 games for Hull F.C. in the 2025 Super League season as the club finished 7th on the table.

=== 2026 ===
On 28 February 2026, Hull announced that Knight was released from his contract with the club to return home to Australia.

On 15 April 2026 it was reported that he had joined Cessnock Goannas in the Newcastle Rugby League

On 10 August 2026 it was reported that he had joined North Sydney Bears in the NSW Cup

== Statistics ==
Year	Team	Games	Tries	Pts
2016	Manly Warringah Sea Eagles	1		
2018	Canberra Raiders	9	1	4
2019	South Sydney Rabbitohs	23	2	8
2020	South Sydney Rabbitohs	19	1	4
2021	South Sydney Rabbitohs	11		
2022	South Sydney Rabbitohs	8		
2023	South Sydney Rabbitohs	5		
2023	Canterbury-Bankstown Bulldogs	5	1	4
2024	Canterbury-Bankstown Bulldogs	2		
2025	Hull FC	19		
	Totals	102	5	20

== Controversy ==
On 16 March 2016, Knight was charged with high range drink driving and exceeding the speed limit. Police claimed to have clocked him doing 137 kilometres per hour in a 70 kilometre zone. Knight was arrested, before being subjected to a breath test where he returned a blood alcohol reading of 0.176. He was also issued with a licence suspension notice and his licence was immediately confiscated. He was then stood down by the Sea Eagles.

== Personal life ==
Knight is currently in a relationship with sports reporter Danika Mason.
