= Blake Solly =

CEO of the South Sydney Rabbitohs

Blake Solly is the CEO of the South Sydney Rabbitohs rugby league football club, that competes in the NRL. He was previously the general manager of the First Utility Super League, the top-level professional rugby league club competition in Europe.
