= Charity Shield (NRL) =

Australian National Rugby League match

- Sport: Rugby league
- Inaugural season: 1982
- Number of teams: 2
- Shield Holders: South Sydney Rabbitohs (2026)
- Most titles: South Sydney Rabbitohs (25 titles)

The National Rugby League's Charity Shield match is an annual pre-season game between the South Sydney Rabbitohs and St. George Illawarra Dragons played before the start of the Premiership regular season. It has been regarded as the unofficial start to the National Rugby League (NRL) season and has been in operation since 1982, with the exception of 2000 and 2001 when Souths were omitted from the NRL.

Originally contested between South Sydney and St. George, and later by the St. George Illawarra Dragons when they formed a joint-venture with Illawarra in 1998 before the 1999 NRL season, the teams go head to head in an annual clash prior to the kickoff of the NRL season.

Since its inception in 1982, the Charity Shield has been played on 42 occasions. Of these, the Dragons (St George and St George Illawarra) have won 18 times, while the Rabbitohs, South Sydney have triumphed outright on 19 occasions. South Sydney holds the shield having won the most recent match in February 2024. Broken down, St George played 17 matches, winning 11; while St George Illawarra, since their joint-venture in 1999, have played 25 matches, winning 7.

The match has been broadcast on national television and is also now regularly screened live in the UK. The Charity Shield is for Souths Cares, Wollongong Hospital and St George Hospital.

== Head To Head ==
Team	Played	Games won	Games lost	Draws	Shields	PF	PA	PD
South Sydney Rabbitohs	43	20	18	5	25	785	737	+48
Both Dragons Teams	43	18	19	5	18	737	785	-48
St. George Dragons	17	11	4	2	11	273	217	+56
St George Illawarra Dragons	26	7	16	3	7	464	568	-104

== Match results ==
Winner	Score	Loser	Match information
Winner	Score	Loser	Date and time	Venue	Referee	Crowd
St. George Dragons	9–7	South Sydney Rabbitohs	13 February 1982	Redfern Oval	J.Danzey	10,980
St. George Dragons	28–10	South Sydney Rabbitohs	12 February 1983	Redfern Oval	K. Roberts	9,120
South Sydney Rabbitohs	24–6	St. George Dragons	10 March 1984	Redfern Oval	K. Roberts	8,365
St. George Dragons	10–8	South Sydney Rabbitohs	10 March 1985	Redfern Oval	K. Roberts	8,022
St. George Dragons	12–0	South Sydney Rabbitohs	15 February 1986	Redfern Oval	M. Stone	10,164
St. George Dragons	28–14	South Sydney Rabbitohs	7 February 1987	Redfern Oval	G. O'Donnell	10,724
South Sydney Rabbitohs	30–6	St. George Dragons	20 February 1988	Redfern Oval		9,678
South Sydney Rabbitohs	20–16	St. George Dragons	25 February 1989	Sydney Football Stadium	B. Harrigan	10,491
South Sydney Rabbitohs	10–10	St. George Dragons	9 February 1990	Sydney Football Stadium		12,791
South Sydney Rabbitohs	16–16	St. George Dragons	2 February 1991	Sydney Football Stadium	B. Harrigan	12,543
South Sydney Rabbitohs	21–20	St. George Dragons	1 February 1992	Sydney Football Stadium	G.Annesley	18,120
St. George Dragons	10–8	South Sydney Rabbitohs	30 January 1993	Sydney Football Stadium	B. Harrigan	18,231
St. George Dragons	14–11	South Sydney Rabbitohs	29 January 1994	Sydney Football Stadium	G. McCallum	19,266
St. George Dragons	18–10	South Sydney Rabbitohs	28 January 1995	Sydney Football Stadium	B. Harrigan	15,643
St. George Dragons	30–6	South Sydney Rabbitohs	17 February 1996	Sydney Football Stadium	K. Jeffes	8,920
St. George Dragons	26–18	South Sydney Rabbitohs	15 February 1997	Sydney Football Stadium	P. Simpkins	10,242
St. George Dragons	14–4	South Sydney Rabbitohs	21 February 1998	Sydney Football Stadium	B. Harrigan	28,310
South Sydney Rabbitohs	16–14	St George Illawarra Dragons	20 February 1999	Sydney Football Stadium	B. Harrigan	19,250
South Sydney Rabbitohs were excluded from competing in the NRL for the 2000 and 2001 seasons
South Sydney Rabbitohs	20–20	St George Illawarra Dragons	16 February 2002	Sydney Football Stadium	B. Harrigan	36,804
St George Illawarra Dragons	28–10	South Sydney Rabbitohs	15 February 2003	Sydney Football Stadium	S. Hampstead	20,834
St George Illawarra Dragons	34–8	South Sydney Rabbitohs	14 February 2004	Sydney Football Stadium		21,513
South Sydney Rabbitohs	30–6	St George Illawarra Dragons	19 February 2005	Sydney Football Stadium		20,481
South Sydney Rabbitohs	14–12	St George Illawarra Dragons	18 February 2006	Telstra Stadium	S. Clark	24,556
St George Illawarra Dragons	16–14	South Sydney Rabbitohs	3 March 2007	Telstra Stadium	S. Hayne	23,053
South Sydney Rabbitohs	24–20	St George Illawarra Dragons	1 March 2008	ANZ Stadium	T. Archer	25,127
South Sydney Rabbitohs	18–6	St George Illawarra Dragons	28 February 2009	ANZ Stadium	B. Cummins/T. Archer	25,871
South Sydney Rabbitohs	26–26	St. George Illawarra Dragons	27 February 2010	ANZ Stadium	A. Klein/B. Suttor	27,221
St George Illawarra Dragons	32–10	South Sydney Rabbitohs	13 February 2011	ANZ Stadium	T. Archer/J. Maxwell	19,267
St George Illawarra Dragons	18–12	South Sydney Rabbitohs	19 February 2012	ANZ Stadium	B.Suttor/J.Robinson	21,398
South Sydney Rabbitohs	28–10	St George Illawarra Dragons	22 February 2013	ANZ Stadium	Jared Maxwell/Adam Devcich	19,630
South Sydney Rabbitohs	38–20	St George Illawarra Dragons	22 February 2014	WIN Stadium	S. Hayne	14,633
South Sydney Rabbitohs	12–12	St George Illawarra Dragons	7 February 2015	ANZ Stadium	Adam Devcich	16,821
South Sydney Rabbitohs	18–14	St George Illawarra Dragons	13 February 2016	ANZ Stadium	G. Badger	13,421
South Sydney Rabbitohs	32–14	St George Illawarra Dragons	19 February 2017	ANZ Stadium	A. Klein/G. Munro	12,516
South Sydney Rabbitohs	22–18	St George Illawarra Dragons	24 February 2018	Glen Willow Stadium	Adam Gee/Chris Sutton	9,133
South Sydney Rabbitohs	36–24	St George Illawarra Dragons	2 March 2019	Glen Willow Stadium	A. Klein	9,027
South Sydney Rabbitohs	26–12	St George Illawarra Dragons	29 February 2020	Glen Willow Stadium	A. Klein/G.Badger	9,124
South Sydney Rabbitohs	48–16	St George Illawarra Dragons	27 February 2021	Glen Willow Stadium	P. Gough	6,840
St George Illawarra Dragons	16-10	South Sydney Rabbitohs	26 February 2022	Glen Willow Stadium	Z. Przeklasa-Adamski	9,257
South Sydney Rabbitohs	42–24	St George Illawarra Dragons	18 February 2023	Glen Willow Stadium	P. Gough	8,317
South Sydney Rabbitohs	28–6	St George Illawarra Dragons	17 February 2024	Netstrata Jubilee Stadium, Sydney	B.Sharpe	8,827
St George Illawarra Dragons	46–26	South Sydney Rabbitohs	22 February 2025	Glen Willow Stadium	A. Gee

=== Biggest wins ===
Points	Score	Winner	Year
32	48–16	South Sydney Rabbitohs	2021
26	34–8	St. George Illawarra Dragons	2004
24	30–6	South Sydney Rabbitohs	1988
24	30–6	St. George Dragons	1996
24	30–6	South Sydney Rabbitohs	2005

=== Most points scored in a game by a winning side ===
Points	Score	Winner	Year
48	48–16	South Sydney Rabbitohs	2021
46	46–26	St. George Illawarra Dragons	2025
38	38–20	South Sydney Rabbitohs	2014
36	36–24	South Sydney Rabbitohs	2019
34	34–8	St. George Illawarra Dragons	2004

=== Most points scored in a game by a losing side ===
Points	Score	Winner	Runner-up	Year
26	46–26	St. George Illawarra Dragons	South Sydney Rabbitohs	2025
24	36–24	South Sydney Rabbitohs	St. George Illawarra Dragons	2019
20	38–20	South Sydney Rabbitohs	St. George Illawarra Dragons	2014
20	21–20	South Sydney Rabbitohs	St. George Dragons	1992
20	24–20	South Sydney Rabbitohs	St. George Illawarra Dragons	2008

=== Most points scored in a game ===
Points	Score	Winner	Year
72	46–26	St. George Illawarra Dragons	2025
66	42-24	South Sydney Rabbitohs	2023
64	48–16	South Sydney Rabbitohs	2021
60	36–24	South Sydney Rabbitohs	2019
58	38–20	South Sydney Rabbitohs	2014
52	26–26	Draw	2010
46	32–14	South Sydney Rabbitohs	2017
44	26–18	St. George Dragons	1997
44	24–20	South Sydney Rabbitohs	2008
42	28–14	St. George Dragons	1987
42	34–8	St. George Illawarra Dragons	2004
42	32–10	St. George Illawarra Dragons	2011

=== Least points scored in a game ===
Points	Score	Winner	Year
12	12–0	St. George Dragons	1986
16	9–7	St. George Dragons	1982
18	10–8	St. George Dragons	1985
18	10–8	St. George Dragons	1993
18	14–4	St. George Dragons	1998

== See also ==
- Rivalries in the National Rugby League
