= Lachlan Ilias =

Greece international rugby league footballer

Personal information
- Full name: Lachlan Ilias
- Born: 9 May 2000 (age 26) Sydney, New South Wales, Australia
- Height: 184 cm (6 ft 0 in)
- Weight: 93 kg (14 st 9 lb)

Playing information
- Position: Halfback, Five-eighth
Club
Years	Team	Pld	T	G	FG	P
2021–24	South Sydney	53	10	2	1	45
2025	St George Illawarra	7	0	0	0	0
2026–	Gold Coast Titans	13	1	4	0	12
	Total	73	11	6	1	57
Representative
Years	Team	Pld	T	G	FG	P
2022	Greece	3	1	2	0	8
- Source: As of 4 September 2026

Lachlan Ilias (born 9 May 2000) is a Greece international rugby league footballer who plays as a halfback or five-eighth for the Gold Coast Titans in the National Rugby League (NRL).

He previously played for the South Sydney Rabbitohs and St. George Illawarra Dragons in the NRL.

== Background ==
Ilias was born in Australia, and is of Greek, Italian, and German heritage. He grew up in the Sydney suburb of Five Dock. He played schoolboy rugby union for Trinity Grammar and was in the 2018 Australian Schoolboys Rugby team. He also played junior rugby league with Leichhardt Wanderers in the Balmain junior district.

== Career ==
=== Early career ===
Ilias signed a development contract with Wests Tigers in 2017. In 2018, after a meeting with Anthony Seibold, Ilias transferred to the South Sydney Rabbitohs for the 2019 season.

=== 2021 ===
Ilias made his debut for South Sydney at halfback in his side's 20−16 victory over the St. George Illawarra Dragons in round 25 of the 2021 NRL season; Ilias scored a try.

=== 2022 ===
In round 15 of the 2022 NRL season, Ilias was substituted shortly after half-time during South Sydney's 32–12 loss against St. George Illawarra. South Sydney were down 32–0 at half-time, and Ilias had knocked the ball on from the opening kick off. Ilias played 26 games for South Sydney in the 2022 NRL season including all three of the clubs finals matches as they reached the preliminary final for a fifth straight season. Souths lost in the preliminary final to eventual premiers Penrith 32–12.

Ilias made his international debut for Greece against France on 17 October 2022 at the 2021 Rugby League World Cup.

=== 2023 ===
In round 4 of the 2023 NRL season, Ilias kicked a field goal during golden point extra-time to win the game for South Sydney over Manly 13–12. Ilias played a total of 24 games for Souths in the 2023 NRL season as the club finished 9th on the table and missed the finals.

=== 2024 ===
After South Sydney lost their opening two games of the 2024 NRL season, Ilias was demoted to reserve grade and replaced with Dean Hawkins. In round 5 of the NSW Cup season, Ilias suffered a fractured tibia during South Sydney's match against the New Zealand Warriors. It was announced that Ilias would miss a minimum of three months. On 29 April, it was announced by the South Sydney club that Ilias was free to negotiate with other teams at the end of the 2024 season. On 25 November 2024, Ilias signed a two-year deal with the St. George Illawarra Dragons.

=== 2025 ===
In round 1 of the 2025 NRL season, Ilias made his club debut for St. George Illawarra against Canterbury, ending in a 28–22 loss. The following week, Ilias came under fire from head coach Shane Flanagan following the clubs loss against his former side South Sydney. Flanagan said of Ilias "The people who needed to make the decisions didn't make them or the right ones and didn't get us into field position". Following the club's heavy loss against the Sydney Roosters in round 8, Ilias was demoted to reserve grade, despite a try assist in the second half of the match. Ilias made just seven appearances with St. George Illawarra in the 2025 NRL season—finishing with 3 wins and 4 losses including a major win against grand finalists Melbourne Storm—as head coach Shane Flanagan opted to select his son Kyle ahead of Ilias as the preferred halfback option. St. George Illawarra would finish the season in 15th place. Ilias led the St. George Illawarra NSW Cup team to the 2025 Grand final at halfback. On 28 September, Ilias played in St. George Illawarra's 30–12 NSW Cup Grand Final loss to New Zealand, finishing with two assists. On 2 November, the Gold Coast Titans announced that they had signed Ilias on a two year deal.

=== 2026 ===
Ilias started in the 6 jersey in round 6 as the Titans went on to destroy the Parramatta eels 52-6 which is one of the biggest wins in Titans history.

Ilias played 13 games finishing the season with 7 try assists for the Gold Coast in the 2026 NRL season as the club finished 16th on the table.

== Statistics ==
As of 17 April 2025

Year	Team	Games	Tries	Goals	FGs	Pts
2021	South Sydney Rabbitohs	1	1			4
2022	South Sydney Rabbitohs	26	5			20
2023	South Sydney Rabbitohs	24	4	2	1	21
2024	South Sydney Rabbitohs	2				
2025	St. George Illawarra Dragons	7				
2026	Gold Coast Titans	13	1	4		12
	Totals	73	11	6	1	53
