= Hame Sele =

Tonga international rugby league footballer

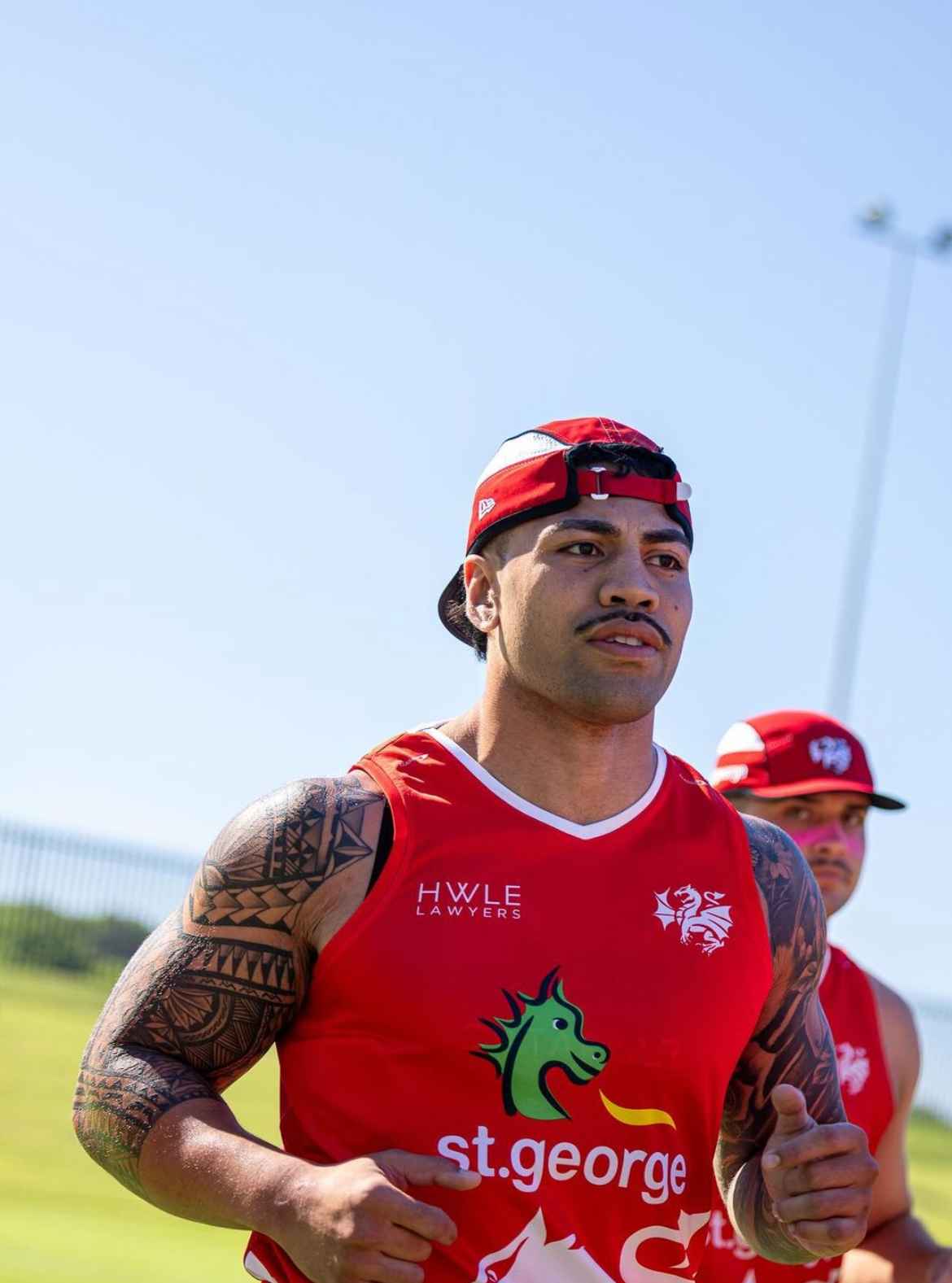

Personal information
- Born: 12 November 1996 (age 30) Kogarah, New South Wales, Australia
- Height: 182 cm (6 ft 0 in)
- Weight: 102 kg (16 st 1 lb)

Playing information
- Position: Prop, Lock
Club
Years	Team	Pld	T	G	FG	P
2017–18	St. George Illawarra	18	0	0	0	0
2019	Penrith Panthers	5	0	0	0	0
2020–23	South Sydney	49	2	0	0	8
2024–26	St. George Illawarra	22	0	0	0	0
2027–	Catalans Dragons	0	0	0	0	0
	Total	94	2	0	0	8
Representative
Years	Team	Pld	T	G	FG	P
2017	NSW City	1	0	0	0	0
2023	Tonga	2	0	0	0	0
- Source: As of 15 November 2026

Hame Sele (born 12 November 1996) is a Tonga international rugby league footballer who plays as a prop forward for the Catalans Dragons in the English Super League.

He previously played for the St. George Illawarra Dragons, Penrith Panthers and the South Sydney Rabbitohs in the NRL, and played at representative level for NSW City in 2017.

== Background ==
Sele was born in Kogarah, New South Wales, Australia. He is of Tongan descent.

He played his junior rugby league for the Kingsgrove Colts, before being signed by the St. George Illawarra Dragons.

== Playing career ==
=== Early career ===
From 2014 to 2016, Sele played for the St. George Illawarra Dragons' NYC team. Late in 2014, he played for the Australian Schoolboys. In July 2015, he played for the New South Wales under-20s team against the Queensland under-20s team. In May 2016, he re-signed with the Dragons on a 2-year contract until the end of 2018.

=== 2017 ===
In 2017, Sele graduated to the Dragons' Intrust Super Premiership NSW team, Illawarra Cutters. In round 6 of the 2017 NRL season, he made his NRL debut for the Dragons against the Manly Warringah Sea Eagles. In May, he was selected in the New South Wales City team, named at lock, he would play in the final ever City vs Country Origin clash on 7 May.

=== 2018 ===
Sele only managed to play 3 NRL games for the season, all of them coming from the interchange bench. At the end of the 2018 season, he was released from the Dragons.

=== 2019 ===
Sele signed with the Penrith Panthers for the start of the 2019 NRL season. He made his debut for Penrith in Round 1 against Parramatta which ended in a 20-12 defeat at Panthers Stadium.

On 16 September, it was announced that Sele was one of ten players that were to be released by the Penrith club at the end of the season.

=== 2020 ===
Early in 2020 Sele joined South Sydney Rabbitohs on a 'train and trial' deal.

He made 7 appearances for South Sydney in the 2020 NRL season as the club reached their third straight preliminary final before losing to Penrith.

=== 2021 ===
Sele scored his first try for South Sydney in round 15 of the 2021 NRL season against Brisbane. Souths would go on to win the game 46-0.

=== 2022 ===
Sele played a total of 14 games for South Sydney in the 2022 NRL season including all three of the clubs finals matches as they reached the preliminary final for a fifth straight season. Souths would lose in the preliminary final to eventual premiers Penrith 32-12.

=== 2023 ===
On 27 July, Sele signed a three-year deal to re-join St. George Illawarra starting in 2024. Sele played a total of 18 games for South Sydney in the 2023 NRL season as the club missed the finals for the first time since 2017.

=== 2024 ===
During round 23 of the 2024 NRL season, Sele was taken to hospital after suffering from an irregular heartbeat during St. George's match against Canterbury. Sele from hospital confirmed he was diagnosed with Pericarditis, Sele would be ruled out for the rest of the season.. Sele played 11 games for St. George Illawarra in the 2024 NRL season as the club finished 11th on the table. Sele revealed later that he thought it was his ribs hurting due to an illness he was carrying before going into the match, he has since returned to training.

=== 2025 ===
Sele was limited to only eight appearances for St. George Illawarra in the 2025 NRL season as the club finished 15th on the table. On 28 September, Sele played in St. George Illawarra's 30-12 NSW Cup Grand Final loss to New Zealand.

=== 2026 ===
Sele played only five games for St. George Illawarra in the 2026 NRL season as the club finished with the Wooden Spoon.

== Statistics ==
Year	Team	Games	Tries	Pts
2017	St. George Illawarra Dragons	15		
2018	St. George Illawarra Dragons	3		
2019	Penrith Panthers	5		
2020	South Sydney Rabbitohs	10		
2021	South Sydney Rabbitohs	7	1	4
2022	South Sydney Rabbitohs	14		
2023	South Sydney Rabbitohs	18	1	4
2024	St. George Illawarra Dragons	11		
2025	St. George Illawarra Dragons	6		
2026	St. George Illawarra Dragons	3		
2027	Catalans Dragons			
	Totals	92	2	8
