= Glen Willow Regional Sports Stadium =

Sports venue of Mudgee, NSW, Australia

Glen Willow Oval
- Interactive map of Glen Willow Oval
- Former names: Glen Willow Regional Sports Stadium
- Location: Mudgee, New South Wales, Australia
- Coordinates: 32.582554°S 149.582933°E
- Capacity: 10,000
- Surface: Grass
- Record attendance: 9,267

Construction
- Opened: 2012

Tenant
- Mudgee Dragons

Glen Willow Sporting Complex is a stadium located in Mudgee, New South Wales built in early 2012.

== History ==
It is named after the original property owned by the Pitt family - located in the Windamere Dam area named “Willow Glen”. Council retained the name "Glen Willow" after acquiring the property.

=== Rugby League ===
The oval has hosted 2 editions of the City vs Country Origin in 2012, and in 2017, which was notable for being the last edition of the representative fixture. The first NRL game at the venue and in Mudgee was on 26 May 2013 when 9,132 people turned up to see the Gold Coast Titans thrash Parramatta 42–4. The record attendance was set on 19 May 2019 for the Round 10 season game between the St. George Illawarra Dragons and the Newcastle Knights with an attendance of 9,267.

The St. George Illawarra Dragons hosted matches at the oval in 2018 and 2019 as well as the Charity Shield pre-season game against South Sydney. Since 2021, Manly Warringah have replaced St George Illawarra in hosting regular season matches.

=== Rugby Union ===
In the National Rugby Championship (NRC) the NSW Country Eagles played one Rugby Union match in the 2018 NRC season.

=== Soccer ===
In the A-League, the Western Sydney based Western Sydney Wanderers have chosen to take their Community Round match of the 2018–19 A-League season, to Mudgee's Glen Willow Regional Sports Stadium, as part of their new Regional Strategy.

== See also ==
- List of Australian rugby league stadiums
- List of Australian rugby union stadiums by capacity
- List of soccer stadiums in Australia
