= Jason Demetriou (rugby league) =

Australian rugby league coach and rugby league footballer (born 1976)

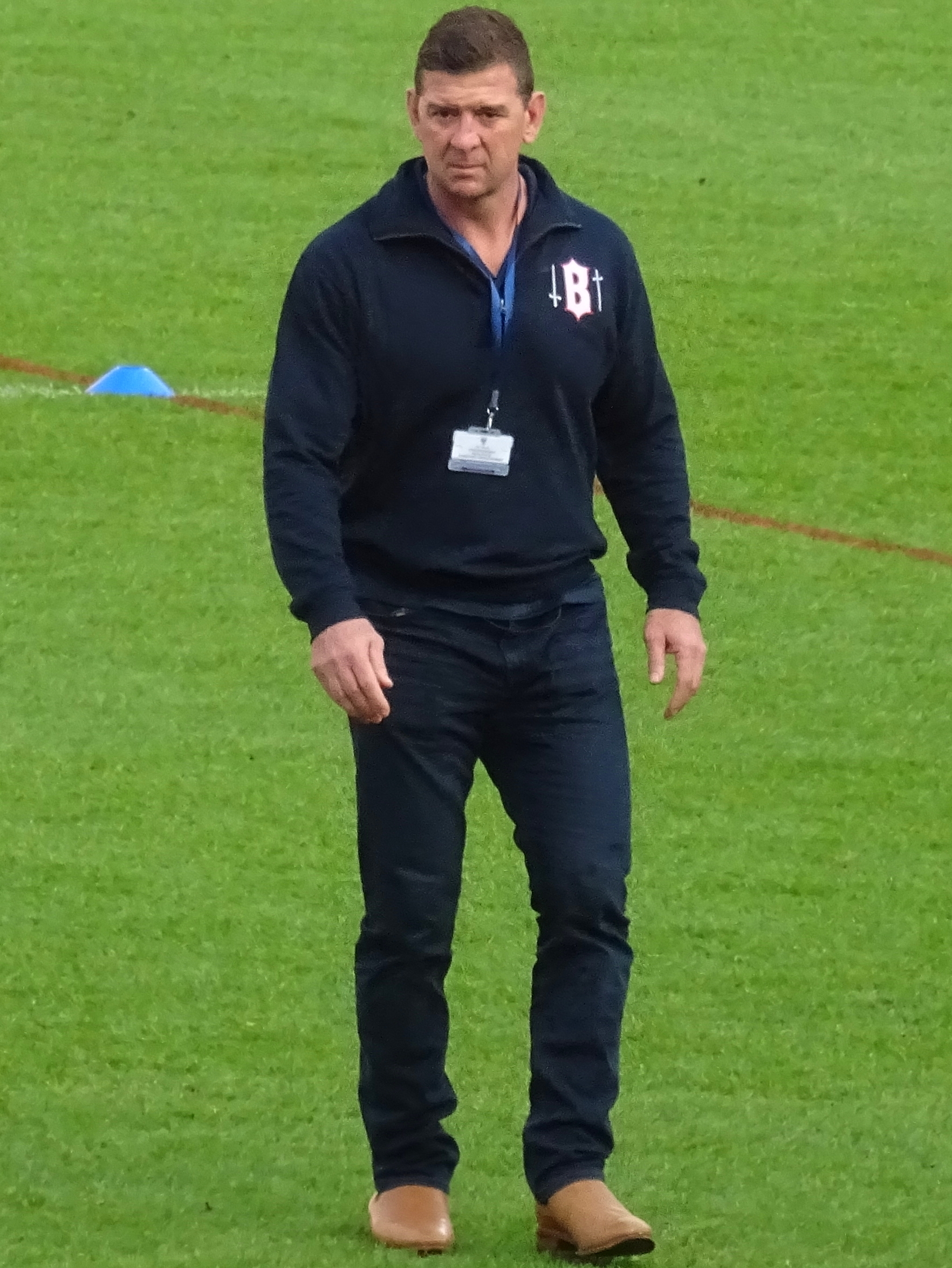

Personal information
- Full name: Jason Andrew Demetriou
- Born: 13 January 1976 (age 50) Sydney, New South Wales, Australia
- Height: 6 ft 0 in (1.83 m)
- Weight: 13 st 12 lb (88 kg)

Playing information
- Position: Centre, Loose forward, Wing, Stand-off
Club
Years	Team	Pld	T	G	FG	P
2000	Lancashire Lynx	10	4	0	1	17
2000	Rochdale Hornets	20	5	0	1	21
2001–03	Widnes Vikings	85	33	1	0	134
2004–10	Wakefield Trinity Wildcats	187	50	2	0	204
2011–12	Keighley Cougars	46	15	0	0	60
	Total	348	107	3	2	436
Representative
Years	Team	Pld	T	G	FG	P
2000	Canada	2	3	0	0	12

Coaching information
Club
Years	Team	Gms	W	D	L	W%
2011–12	Keighley Cougars	33	20	0	13	61
2013–14	Northern Pride	51	40	0	11	78
2020	South Sydney	2	2	0	0	100
2022–24	South Sydney	58	29	0	29	50
2026–	London Broncos	34	32	0	2	94
	Total	178	123	0	55	69
Representative
Years	Team	Gms	W	D	L	W%
2014	Queensland Residents	1	1	0	0	100
2024–	PNG PM's XIII	2	0	0	2	0
2024–	Papua New Guinea	8	5	0	3	63
- Source: As of 19 November 2026

Jason Demetriou (/ˈdəmiːtrɪoʊ/) (born 13 January 1976) is an Australian professional rugby league coach who is the head coach of the London Broncos in the Super League and Papua New Guinea at international level.

He is a former head coach of the South Sydney Rabbitohs in the NRL and a former professional rugby league footballer.

Predominantly a centre as a player, Demetriou spent all of his 13-year playing career in England, playing for Lancashire Lynx, Rochdale Hornets, Widnes Vikings, Wakefield Trinity Wildcats and the Keighley Cougars and for Canada at international level.

He has previously held head coaching jobs at the Keighley Cougars, Northern Pride and the Illawarra Cutters and has been an assistant coach at the St George Illawarra Dragons, Brisbane Broncos and North Queensland Cowboys, where he was on the coaching staff that won the 2015 NRL Grand Final.

== Playing career ==
=== Early career ===
Born in Sydney, Demetriou grew up in the St George area of Sydney and supported the Balmain Tigers as a child. He is of Greek and Canadian descent; his grandmother was born in Alberta. As a teen, Demetriou played in the Harold Matthews Cup and S.G. Ball Cup for the St George Dragons. From there Demetriou moved to the Newtown Jets, where he played for their Metropolitan Cup side and later the Bondi Roosters, before moving to England in December 1999. In 2000, Demetriou played for the now-defunct Lancashire Lynx and the Rochdale Hornets.

=== Widnes Vikings ===
In 2001, Demetriou joined the Widnes Vikings in the second division Northern Ford Premiership, with side gaining promotion to the Super League in Demetriou's first season with club and Demetriou being named the 2001 Northern Ford Premiership Overseas Player of the Year.

=== Wakefield Trinity Wildcats ===
In 2004, Demetriou joined the Wakefield Trinity Wildcats (captain) where he spent the next seven seasons, captaining the club for five of those seasons. In doing so, he became the first Australian player without NRL experience to captain a Super League team.

In 2006, he was named Wakefield Trinity Wildcat's Player of the Year. That season he scored a late try against local rivals, the Castleford Tigers, to keep Wakefield Trinity Wildcats in the Super League, simultaneously relegating Castleford Tigers. The moment was captured and a large copy of the photo is on display outside the coach's office at Belle Vue.

In 2007, he was named as Wakefield Trinity Wildcats' Player of the Year again. He was also named at centre in the Super League Dream Team, and was short-listed for the Man of Steel award along with Trent Barrett and James Roby.

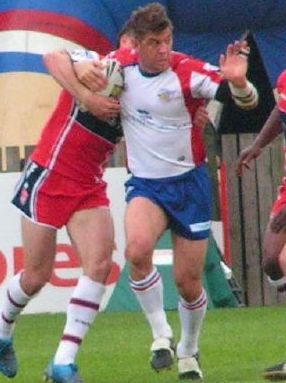
Demetriou playing for the Wakefield Trinity Wildcats in 2008

In 2009, he wore the number 8 jersey for Wakefield Trinity Wildcats, in memory of his close friend Adam Watene. Demetriou is associated with the Adam Watene Fund, helping raise funds for his family in New Zealand. In 2010, he was awarded a 3-month testimonial at the Wakefield Trinity Wildcats as a reward for his hard work and dedication to English rugby league.

=== International career ===
Demetriou played two games for Canada at the 2000 Rugby League Emerging Nations Tournament.

Demetriou said in 2022, "I should have played twice for Greece before I retired but off-season surgery stopped me. Probably the one regret I had during my career was not being able to represent Greece."

== Coaching career ==
=== Keighley Cougars ===
Demetriou's contract with Wakefield Trinity Wildcats expired at the end of 2010, and he was told that it would not be renewed. He initially joined the York City Knights for 2011, but a subsequent offer as player-coach for Keighley Cougars arose, and was accepted. In his first season in charge, Keighley gained promotion to the Kingstone Press Championship.

=== Northern Pride ===
Demetriou returned to Australia in 2013, becoming the head coach for the Northern Pride in the Queensland Cup. During his two seasons at the Pride, the club won back-to-back minor premierships, the 2014 Queensland Cup Grand Final and the inaugural NRL State Championship game. In 2014, he coached the Queensland Residents side, who defeated the NSW Cup rep side 24–16.

=== North Queensland Cowboys ===
In October 2014, Demetriou joined the North Queensland Cowboys as an assistant coach. On 4 October 2015, Demetriou was a member of the North Queensland coaching staff in the side's 17–16 Grand Final victory over Brisbane.

=== St George Dragons ===
In January 2016, Demetriou joined the St. George Illawarra Dragons as an assistant coach and as head coach to their NSW Cup feeder team, the Illawarra Cutters. In September 2016, he was named coach of the 2016 Intrust Super Premiership NSW Team of the Year. He went on to win the grand final with the Cutters that year.

=== Brisbane Broncos ===
In 2017, Demetriou joined Brisbane under head coach Wayne Bennett. He took over as the side's attacking coach in Round 6 of the 2018 NRL season, with the side scoring the second most tries in the competition from that point forward.

=== South Sydney Rabbitohs ===
In December 2018, he joined South Sydney as an assistant coach, following Bennett to the club. In February 2020, it was announced that Demetriou would succeed Bennett as head coach at the end of the 2021 NRL season. On 6 August 2020, it was announced Demetriou would make his coaching debut for the South Sydney Rabbitohs after head coach Wayne Bennett breached the NRL's COVID-19 protocols.

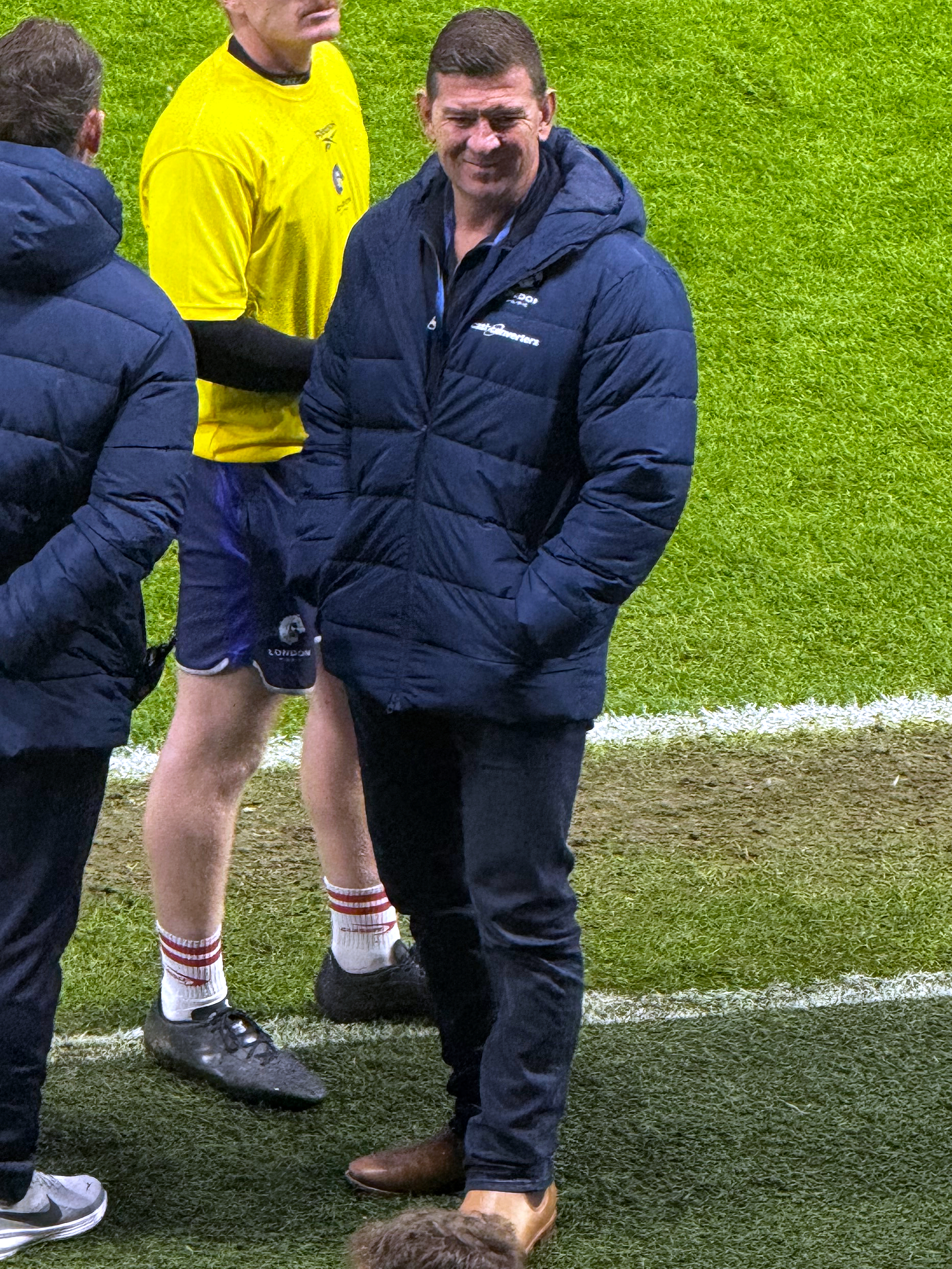
Demetriou down at the touch line at Wimbledon in January 2026

His first match as coach saw the South Sydney club defeat Brisbane by 28–10 at ANZ Stadium in Sydney.

Following the conclusion of the 2021 NRL season, he replaced the outgoing Bennett as the new head coach of South Sydney. In his first official game in charge, South Sydney were defeated 11-4 by Brisbane at Suncorp Stadium. In round 3 of the 2022 NRL season, he earned his first win in charge of South Sydney against arch rivals the Sydney Roosters. In his first full season at South Sydney, he guided the club to their fifth straight preliminary final. Souths took an early 12-0 lead over Penrith but were eventually defeated 32-12. In his second season at the club, Demetriou guided Souths to second place on the table during the midway point of the 2023 NRL season. However, the club would suffer a form slump in the second half of the year only winning four matches. South Sydney would finish 9th on the table missing the finals for the first time since 2017.

At the start of the 2024 NRL season under Demetriou, South Sydney lost their opening three matches of the season including a humiliating 48-6 loss against arch-rivals the Sydney Roosters. It was South Sydney's worst start to a season since 2008. Ahead of the clubs round 6 game against Cronulla, it was reported that Demetriou would be sacked as South Sydney head coach if they failed to win the match. Despite the team losing the match 34-22, Demetriou was not terminated due to an observable improvement in the team's effort for the game. The team would ultimately suffer yet another defeat after their subsequent bye, losing to Melbourne 54-20. Although no formal announcement was made by the club about Demetriou's status immediately following the loss, it was reported that club officials would be holding an official meeting regarding his future. On 30 April 2024, the club formally terminated Demetriou as coach, appointing Ben Hornby as an interim for the remainder of the season.

=== Papua New Guinea ===
On 27 August 2024, it was reported that Demetriou had been appointed coach of the men's Papua New Guinea national rugby league team.

=== London Broncos ===
In September 2025, Demetriou was confirmed as the new head coach of the London Broncos from 2026 onwards. This was confirmed to be a three-year deal after the Darren Lockyer led takeover of the London side was ratified in September 2025.

In August 2026, the Demetriou coached Broncos lifted the RFL Championship Leaders' Shield.

Demetriou coached London to their 1895 Cup Final victory over the Widnes Vikings at the Halliwell Jones Stadium in August 2026.

In October 2026, he coached the Broncos in their Championship Grand Final victory over Doncaster at Plough Lane.
