= 2019 NRL Finals Series =

- Duration: 13 Sep – 6 Oct 2019
- Teams: 8
- Premiers: Sydney Roosters (15th title)
- Minor premiers: Melbourne Storm (4th title)
- Matches played: 9
- Points scored: 292
- Highest attendance: 82,922 (Sydney vs Canberra Grand Final)
- Lowest attendance: 15,495 (Manly Warringah vs Cronulla-Sutherland Elimination Final)
- Average attendance: 32,313
- Attendance: 290,818
- Broadcast partners: Nine Network; Fox League
- Top points scorer(s): Adam Reynolds (22)
- Top try-scorer(s): James Tedesco (3)

The 2019 NRL Finals Series determined the winner of the 2019 National Rugby League season. The series ran over four weeks in September and October 2019. It culminated with the 2019 NRL Grand Final at Sydney's ANZ Stadium on 6 October 2019, where the Sydney Roosters defeated the Canberra Raiders 14–8.

The top eight teams from the 2019 NRL Season qualified for the finals series, playing under the same format since 2012. The qualifying teams were Melbourne, Sydney, South Sydney, Canberra, Parramatta, Manly Warringah, Cronulla-Sutherland and Brisbane.

== Qualification ==
2019 NRL season
Pos	Team	Pld	W	D	L	B	PF	PA	PD	Pts
1	Melbourne Storm	24	20	0	4	1	631	300	+331	42
2	Sydney Roosters	24	17	0	7	1	627	363	+264	36
3	South Sydney Rabbitohs	24	16	0	8	1	521	417	+104	34
4	Canberra Raiders	24	15	0	9	1	524	374	+150	32
5	Parramatta Eels	24	14	0	10	1	533	473	+60	30
6	Manly-Warringah Sea Eagles	24	14	0	10	1	496	446	+50	30
7	Cronulla-Sutherland Sharks	24	12	0	12	1	514	464	+50	26
8	Brisbane Broncos	24	11	1	12	1	432	489	−57	25
9	Wests Tigers	24	11	0	13	1	475	486	−11	24
10	Penrith Panthers	24	11	0	13	1	413	474	−61	24
11	Newcastle Knights	24	10	0	14	1	485	522	−37	22
12	Canterbury-Bankstown Bulldogs	24	10	0	14	1	326	477	−151	22
13	New Zealand Warriors	24	9	1	14	1	433	574	−141	21
14	North Queensland Cowboys	24	9	0	15	1	378	500	−122	20
15	St. George Illawarra Dragons	24	8	0	16	1	427	575	−148	18
16	Gold Coast Titans	24	4	0	20	1	370	651	−281	10

Melbourne qualified for their 9th consecutive finals series. Sydney qualified for their 3rd consecutive final series. South Sydney qualified for their 2nd consecutive finals series. Canberra qualified for their first finals series since 2016. Parramatta qualified for their first finals series since 2017. Manly Warringah qualified for their first finals series since 2017. Cronulla-Sutherland qualified for their 5th consecutive series. Brisbane qualified for their 6th consecutive series.

== Venues ==
Canberra's GIO Stadium hosted one match, Melbourne's AAMI Park hosted two matches and Sydney hosted the remaining six matches, between ANZ Stadium, Bankwest Stadium, Lottoland and the Sydney Cricket Ground.

Canberra	Melbourne	Sydney
GIO Stadium	AAMI Park	ANZ Stadium
Capacity: 25,011	Capacity: 30,050	Capacity: 83,500
Games: 1	Games: 2	Games: 2
2019 NRL Finals Series is located in Australia
Sydney
Bankwest Stadium	Lottoland	Sydney Cricket Ground
Capacity: 30,000	Capacity: 23,000	Capacity: 46,000
Games: 1	Games: 1	Games: 2

== Finals structure ==
The system used for the 2019 NRL finals series was a final eight system. In this format, the top four teams in the eight receive a "double chance" when they play in week-one qualifying finals, such that if a top-four team lose in the first week it still remained in the finals, playing a semi-final the next week against the winner of an elimination final. The bottom four of the eight will play knock-out games – only the winners survive and move on to the next week. Home-ground advantage goes to the team with the higher ladder position in the first two weeks, to the qualifying final winners in the third week.

In the second week, the winners of the qualifying finals receive a bye to the third week. The losers of the qualifying final play the winners of the elimination finals in a semi-final. In the third week, the winners of the semi-finals from week two play the winners of the qualifying finals in the first week. The winners of those matches move on to the grand final at ANZ Stadium in Sydney.

=== Bracket ===
Qualifying and elimination finals
14 Sep, AAMI Park
1	Melbourne	10
4	Canberra	12
15 Sep, Bankwest Stadium
5	Parramatta	58
8	Brisbane	0
14 Sep, Lottoland
6	Manly Warringah	28
7	Cronulla-Sutherland	16
13 Sep, SCG
2	Sydney	30
3	South Sydney	6

Semi-finals
21 Sep, AAMI Park
Melbourne	32
Parramatta	0
20 Sep, ANZ Stadium
South Sydney	34
Manly Warringah	26

Preliminary finals
27 Sep, GIO Stadium
Canberra	16
South Sydney	10
28 Sep, SCG
Sydney	14
Melbourne	6

Grand final
6 Oct, ANZ Stadium
Sydney	14
Canberra	8

== Qualifying and elimination finals ==
=== 2nd Qualifying final: Sydney v South Sydney ===
Friday, 13 September
7:50pm

Sydney Roosters	30 – 6	South Sydney Rabbitohs
Tries: Joseph Manu (3') 1 Mitchell Aubusson (11') 1 Boyd Cordner (26') 1 Sio Siua Taukeiaho (30') 1 James Tedesco (36') 1 Latrell Mitchell (59') 1 Goals: Latrell Mitchell 3/7 (9' pen, 27', 31')	1st: 26 – 0; 2nd: 4 – 6	Tries: 1 (65') Adam Reynolds; Goals: 1/1 Adam Reynolds (66')

Sydney Cricket Ground, Sydney
Attendance: 30,370
Referee: Gerard Sutton, Adam Gee
Player of the Match: Luke Keary

Team lists:

FB	1	James Tedesco
WG	2	Daniel Tupou
CE	3	Latrell Mitchell
CE	4	Joseph Manu
WG	5	Brett Morris
FE	6	Luke Keary
HB	7	Cooper Cronk
PR	8	Jared Waerea-Hargreaves
HK	9	Sam Verrills
PR	10	Isaac Liu
SR	11	Boyd Cordner (c)
SR	12	Mitchell Aubusson
LK	13	Victor Radley
Substitutes:
IC	14	Angus Crichton
IC	15	Zane Tetevano
IC	16	Nat Butcher
IC	17	Sio Siua Taukeiaho
Coach:
Trent Robinson

FB	1	Adam Doueihi
WG	2	Alex Johnston
CE	3	James Roberts
CE	4	Campbell Graham
WG	5	Corey Allan
FE	6	Cody Walker
HB	7	Adam Reynolds
PR	18	George Burgess
HK	9	Damien Cook
PR	10	Liam Knight
SR	11	John Sutton (c)
SR	12	Jaydn Su'A
LK	13	Cameron Murray
Substitutes:
IC	8	Tevita Tatola
IC	14	Ethan Lowe
IC	16	Thomas Burgess
IC	17	Mark Nicholls
Coach:
Wayne Bennett

=== 1st Qualifying final: Melbourne v Canberra ===
Saturday, 14 September
5:35pm

Melbourne Storm	10 – 12	Canberra Raiders
Tries: Suliasi Vunivalu (43') 1 Goals: Cameron Smith 3/4 (40' pen, 47' pen, 50' pen)	1st: 2 – 6; 2nd: 8 – 6	Tries: 1 (4') Bailey Simonsson; 1 (78') John Bateman; Goals: 2/4 Jarrod Croker (5', 79')

AAMI Park, Melbourne
Attendance: 20,136
Referee: Ashley Klein, Chris Sutton
Player of the Match: John Bateman

Team lists:

FB	1	Ryan Papenhuyzen
WG	2	Suliasi Vunivalu
CE	3	Will Chambers
CE	4	Justin Olam
WG	5	Josh Addo-Carr
FE	6	Cameron Munster
HB	7	Jahrome Hughes
PR	8	Jesse Bromwich
HK	9	Cameron Smith (c)
PR	10	Nelson Asofa-Solomona
SR	11	Felise Kaufusi
SR	12	Kenny Bromwich
LK	13	Dale Finucane
Substitutes:
IC	14	Brandon Smith
IC	15	Tui Kamikamica
IC	16	Max King
IC	17	Joe Stimson
Coach:
Craig Bellamy

FB	1	Charnze Nicoll-Klokstad
WG	14	Bailey Simonsson
CE	3	Jarrod Croker (c)
CE	2	Nick Cotric
WG	5	Jordan Rapana
FE	6	Jack Wighton
HB	7	Aidan Sezer
PR	15	Dunamis Lui
HK	9	Josh Hodgson (c)
PR	10	Sia Soliola
SR	11	John Bateman
SR	12	Elliott Whitehead
LK	13	Joseph Tapine
Substitutes:
IC	4	Joseph Leilua
IC	8	Josh Papalii
IC	16	Corey Horsburgh
IC	19	Emre Guler
Coach:
Ricky Stuart

=== 2nd Elimination final: Manly-Warringah v Cronulla-Sutherland ===
Saturday, 14 September
7:50pm

Manly Warringah Sea Eagles	28 – 16	Cronulla-Sutherland Sharks
Tries: Apisai Koroisau (9') 1 Moses Suli (12') 1 Brad Parker (19') 1 Addin Fonua-Blake (52') 1 Brendan Elliot (72') 1 Goals: Reuben Garrick 4/5 (10', 13', 20', 54')	1st: 18 – 4; 2nd: 10 – 12	Tries: 1 (25') Bronson Xerri; 1 (45') Aaron Gray; 1 (79') Josh Morris; Goals: 2/3 Shaun Johnson (47', 79')

Lottoland, Sydney
Attendance: 15,495
Referee: Matt Cecchin, Henry Perenara
Player of the Match: Daly Cherry-Evans

Team lists:

FB	1	Brendan Elliot
WG	2	Jorge Taufua
CE	3	Brad Parker
CE	4	Moses Suli
WG	5	Reuben Garrick
FE	6	Dylan Walker
HB	7	Daly Cherry-Evans (c)
PR	8	Addin Fonua-Blake
HK	9	Apisai Koroisau
PR	10	Sean Keppie
SR	11	Corey Waddell
SR	12	Jack Gosiewski
LK	13	Jake Trbojevic
Substitutes:
IC	14	Manase Fainu
IC	15	Haumole Olakau'atu
IC	16	Lloyd Perrett
IC	17	Toafofoa Sipley
Coach:
Des Hasler

FB	1	Josh Dugan
WG	2	Sosaia Feki
CE	3	Bronson Xerri
CE	4	Josh Morris
WG	5	Aaron Gray
FE	6	Shaun Johnson
HB	7	Chad Townsend
PR	16	Andrew Fifita
HK	9	Jayden Brailey
PR	10	Matt Prior
SR	11	Briton Nikora
SR	12	Wade Graham
LK	13	Paul Gallen (c)
Substitutes:
IC	8	Aaron Woods
IC	14	Kurt Capewell
IC	15	Jack Williams
IC	17	Braden Hamlin-Uele
Coach:
John Morris

=== 1st Elimination final: Parramatta v Brisbane ===
Sunday, 15 September
4:00pm

Parramatta Eels	58 – 0	Brisbane Broncos
Tries: Mitchell Moses (17', 73') 2 Maika Sivo (40', 49') 2 Dylan Brown (53', 76') 2 Michael Jennings (12') 1 Blake Ferguson (20') 1 Shaun Lane (33') 1 Tepai Moeroa (71') 1 Daniel Alvaro (80') 1 Goals: Mitchell Moses 6/11 (13', 19', 54', 72', 75', 78'); Manu Ma'u 1/1 (80')	1st: 24 – 0; 2nd: 34 – 0

Bankwest Stadium, Sydney
Attendance: 29,372
Referee: Ben Cummins, Grant Atkins
Player of the Match: Mitchell Moses

Team lists:

FB	1	Clint Gutherson (c)
WG	2	Maika Sivo
CE	3	Michael Jennings
CE	4	Waqa Blake
WG	5	Blake Ferguson
FE	6	Dylan Brown
HB	7	Mitchell Moses
PR	15	Daniel Alvaro
HK	9	Reed Mahoney
PR	10	Junior Paulo
SR	11	Shaun Lane
SR	12	Manu Ma'u
LK	13	Nathan Brown
Substitutes:
IC	14	Brad Takairangi
IC	16	Ray Stone
IC	17	Marata Niukore
IC	18	Tepai Moeroa
Coach:
Brad Arthur

FB	1	Anthony Milford
WG	5	Jamayne Isaako
CE	3	Kotoni Staggs
CE	4	Alex Glenn
WG	2	Corey Oates
FE	6	Darius Boyd (c)
HB	7	Jake Turpin
PR	8	Matthew Lodge
HK	9	Andrew McCullough
PR	10	Payne Haas
SR	11	David Fifita
SR	12	Matt Gillett
LK	13	Joe Ofahengaue
Substitutes:
IC	14	James Segeyaro
IC	15	Thomas Flegler
IC	16	Gehamat Shibisaki
IC	17	Patrick Carrigan
Coach:
Anthony Seibold

== Semi-finals ==
=== 2nd Semi-final: South Sydney v Manly-Warringah ===
Friday, 20 September
7:50pm

South Sydney Rabbitohs	34 – 26	Manly Warringah Sea Eagles
Tries: Cameron Murray (40', 71') 2 Alex Johnston (10') 1 Cody Walker (15') 1 John Sutton (68') 1 Goals: Adam Reynolds 7/9 (16', 21' pen, 40', 55' pen, 69', 73', 80' pen); Sin Bin: Cody Walker (29')	1st: 18 – 16; 2nd: 16 – 10	Tries: 1 (18') Brad Parker; 1 (24') Corey Waddell; 1 (36') Daly Cherry-Evans; 1 (47') Moses Suli; 1 (57') Jack Gosiewski; Goals: 3/5 Reuben Garrick (25', 37', 57'); Sin Bin: (54') Brad Parker (67') Jake Trbojevic

ANZ Stadium, Sydney
Attendance: 32,127
Referee: Gerard Sutton, Adam Gee
Player of the Match: Cameron Murray

Team lists:

FB	1	Adam Doueihi
WG	2	Alex Johnston
CE	3	James Roberts
CE	4	Dane Gagai
WG	5	Campbell Graham
FE	6	Cody Walker
HB	7	Adam Reynolds
PR	8	Thomas Burgess
HK	9	Damien Cook
PR	10	Liam Knight
SR	11	John Sutton
SR	12	Sam Burgess (c)
LK	13	Cameron Murray
Substitutes:
IC	14	George Burgess
IC	15	Mark Nicholls
IC	16	Tevita Tatola
IC	17	Ethan Lowe
Coach:
Wayne Bennett

FB	1	Brendan Elliot
WG	2	Jorge Taufua
CE	3	Brad Parker
CE	4	Moses Suli
WG	5	Reuben Garrick
FE	6	Dylan Walker
HB	7	Daly Cherry-Evans (c)
PR	8	Addin Fonua-Blake
HK	9	Apisai Koroisau
PR	10	Martin Taupau
SR	11	Corey Waddell
SR	12	Jack Gosiewski
LK	13	Jake Trbojevic
Substitutes:
IC	14	Manase Fainu
IC	15	Haumole Olakau'atu
IC	16	Sean Keppie
IC	17	Lloyd Perrett
Coach:
Des Hasler

=== 1st Semi-final: Melbourne v Parramatta ===
Saturday, 21 September
7:50pm

Melbourne Storm	32 – 0	Parramatta Eels
Tries: Josh Addo-Carr (6', 28') 2 Suliasi Vunivalu (10') 1 Cameron Munster (17') 1 Jahrome Hughes (22') 1 Ryan Papenhuyzen (59') 1 Nelson Asofa-Solomona (79') 1 Goals: Cameron Smith 1/6 (22'); Ryan Papenhuyzen 1/1 (80'); Cameron Munster 0/1; Sin Bin: Cameron Smith (30')	1st: 22 – 0; 2nd: 10 – 0

AAMI Park, Melbourne
Attendance: 21,015
Referee: Ben Cummins, Grant Atkins
Player of the Match: Nelson Asofa-Solomona

Team lists:

FB	1	Ryan Papenhuyzen
WG	2	Suliasi Vunivalu
CE	18	Curtis Scott
CE	4	Justin Olam
WG	5	Josh Addo-Carr
FE	6	Cameron Munster
HB	7	Jahrome Hughes
PR	8	Jesse Bromwich
HK	9	Cameron Smith (c)
PR	10	Nelson Asofa-Solomona
SR	11	Felise Kaufusi
SR	12	Kenny Bromwich
LK	13	Dale Finucane
Substitutes:
IC	3	Will Chambers
IC	14	Brandon Smith
IC	15	Tui Kamikamica
IC	16	Max King
Coach:
Craig Bellamy

FB	1	Clint Gutherson (c)
WG	2	Maika Sivo
CE	3	Michael Jennings
CE	4	Waqa Blake
WG	5	Blake Ferguson
FE	6	Dylan Brown
HB	7	Mitchell Moses
PR	8	Kane Evans
HK	9	Reed Mahoney
PR	10	Junior Paulo
SR	11	Shaun Lane
SR	12	Manu Ma'u
LK	13	Nathan Brown
Substitutes:
IC	14	Brad Takairangi
IC	15	Daniel Alvaro
IC	16	Tepai Moeroa
IC	17	Marata Niukore
Coach:
Brad Arthur

== Preliminary finals ==
=== 1st Preliminary final: Canberra v South Sydney ===
Friday, 27 September
7:50pm

Canberra Raiders	16 – 10	South Sydney Rabbitohs
Tries: Jarrod Croker (15') 1 Jack Wighton (45') 1 Josh Papalii (73') 1 Goals: Jarrod Croker 2/4 (16', 75'); Sin Bin: Charnze Nicoll-Klokstad (70')	1st: 6 – 6; 2nd: 10 – 4	Tries: 1 (28') Dane Gagai; 1 (79') Campbell Graham; Goals: 1/2 Adam Reynolds (30')

GIO Stadium, Canberra
Attendance: 26,567
Referee: Ben Cummins, Grant Atkins
Player of the Match: Josh Papalii

Team lists:

FB	1	Charnze Nicoll-Klokstad
WG	2	Nick Cotric
CE	3	Jarrod Croker (c)
CE	4	Joseph Leilua
WG	5	Jordan Rapana
FE	6	Jack Wighton
HB	7	Aidan Sezer
PR	8	Josh Papalii
HK	9	Josh Hodgson (c)
PR	10	Sia Soliola
SR	11	John Bateman
SR	12	Elliott Whitehead
LK	13	Joseph Tapine
Substitutes:
IC	14	Bailey Simonsson
IC	15	Emre Guler
IC	16	Corey Horsburgh
IC	17	Dunamis Lui
Coach:
Ricky Stuart

FB	1	Adam Doueihi
WG	2	Alex Johnston
CE	5	Campbell Graham
CE	4	Dane Gagai
WG	19	Corey Allan
FE	6	Cody Walker
HB	7	Adam Reynolds
PR	12	Sam Burgess (c)
HK	9	Damien Cook
PR	10	Liam Knight
SR	11	John Sutton
SR	16	Ethan Lowe
LK	13	Cameron Murray
Substitutes:
IC	8	Thomas Burgess
IC	15	Tevita Tatola
IC	17	Mark Nicholls
IC	20	Dean Britt
Coach:
Wayne Bennett

=== 2nd Preliminary final: Sydney v Melbourne ===
Saturday, 28 September
7:50pm

Sydney Roosters	14 – 6	Melbourne Storm
Tries: Boyd Cordner (15') 1 James Tedesco (69') 1 Goals: Latrell Mitchell 3/4 (2' pen, 33' pen, 70'); Sin Bin: Sio Siua Taukeiaho (1')	1st: 8 – 0; 2nd: 6 – 6	Tries: 1 (51') Nelson Asofa-Solomona; Goals: 1/1 Cameron Smith (52'); Sin Bin: (1') Nelson Asofa-Solomona

Sydney Cricket Ground, Sydney
Attendance: 32,814
Referee: Gerard Sutton, Adam Gee
Player of the Match: Boyd Cordner

Team lists:

FB	1	James Tedesco
WG	2	Daniel Tupou
CE	3	Latrell Mitchell
CE	4	Joseph Manu
WG	5	Brett Morris
FE	6	Luke Keary
HB	7	Cooper Cronk
PR	8	Isaac Liu
HK	9	Sam Verrills
PR	10	Sio Siua Taukeiaho
SR	11	Boyd Cordner (c)
SR	12	Mitchell Aubusson
LK	13	Victor Radley
Substitutes:
IC	14	Angus Crichton
IC	15	Zane Tetevano
IC	16	Nat Butcher
IC	17	Lindsay Collins
Coach:
Trent Robinson

FB	1	Ryan Papenhuyzen
WG	17	Will Chambers
CE	3	Curtis Scott
CE	4	Justin Olam
WG	5	Josh Addo-Carr
FE	6	Cameron Munster
HB	7	Jahrome Hughes
PR	8	Jesse Bromwich
HK	9	Cameron Smith (c)
PR	10	Nelson Asofa-Solomona
SR	11	Felise Kaufusi
SR	12	Kenny Bromwich
LK	13	Dale Finucane
Substitutes:
IC	14	Brandon Smith
IC	15	Tui Kamikamica
IC	16	Max King
IC	21	Sandor Earl
Coach:
Craig Bellamy

== Grand Final ==
Sunday, 6 October
7:40pm (AEDT)

Sydney Roosters	14 – 8	Canberra Raiders
Tries: Sam Verrills (7') 1 James Tedesco (73') 1 Goals: Latrell Mitchell 3/5 (8', 21' pen, 74'); Sin Bin: Cooper Cronk (50') 1	1st: 8 – 6; 2nd: 6 – 2	Tries: 1 (31') Jack Wighton; Goals: 2/2 Jarrod Croker (32', 50' pen)

ANZ Stadium
Attendance: 82,922
Clive Churchill Medal: Jack Wighton
Referee: Ben Cummins, Gerard Sutton

Team lists:

FB	1	James Tedesco
WG	2	Daniel Tupou
CE	3	Latrell Mitchell
CE	4	Joseph Manu
WG	5	Brett Morris
FE	6	Luke Keary
HB	7	Cooper Cronk
PR	8	Jared Waerea-Hargreaves
HK	9	Sam Verrills
PR	10	Isaac Liu
SR	11	Boyd Cordner (c)
SR	12	Mitchell Aubusson
LK	13	Victor Radley
Substitutes:
IC	14	Angus Crichton
IC	16	Nat Butcher
IC	17	Sio Siua Taukeiaho
IC	20	Jake Friend
Coach:
Trent Robinson

FB	1	Charnze Nicoll-Klokstad
WG	2	Nick Cotric
CE	3	Jarrod Croker (c)
CE	4	Joseph Leilua
WG	5	Jordan Rapana
FE	6	Jack Wighton
HB	7	Aidan Sezer
PR	8	Josh Papalii
HK	9	Josh Hodgson (c)
PR	10	Sia Soliola
SR	11	John Bateman
SR	12	Elliott Whitehead
LK	13	Joseph Tapine
Substitutes:
IC	14	Bailey Simonsson
IC	15	Emre Guler
IC	16	Corey Horsburgh
IC	17	Dunamis Lui
Coach:
Ricky Stuart
