= 2020 World Club Challenge =

Rugby league competition

2020 Betfred World Club Challenge
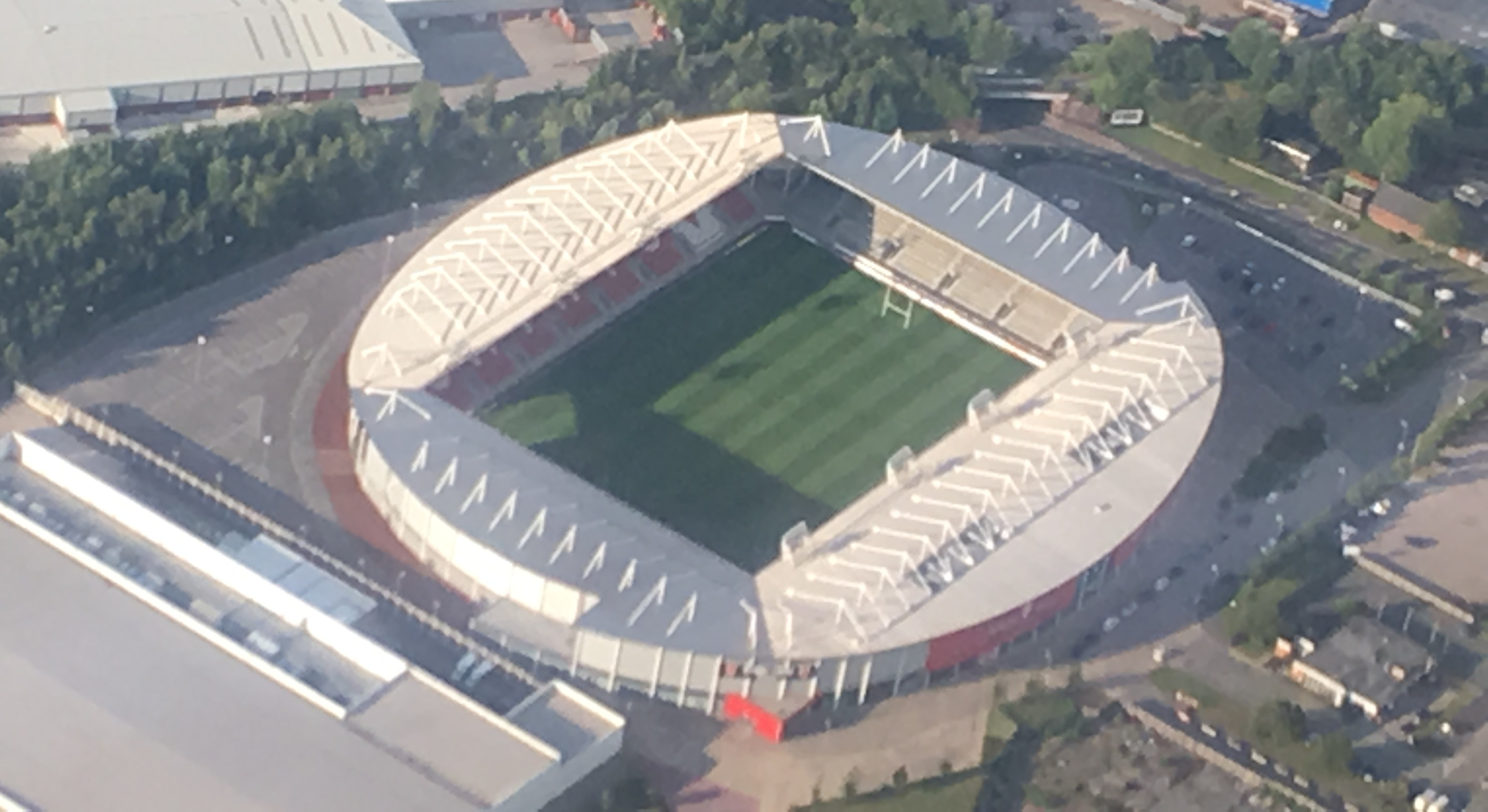
- Totally Wicked Stadium hosted the match
St Helens	Sydney Roosters
(Super League)	(NRL)
12	20
	1	2	Total
STH	6	6	12
SYD	8	12	20
- Date: 22 February 2020
- Stadium: Totally Wicked Stadium
- Location: St Helens
- Man of the Match: Luke Keary
- Referee: (England) Chris Kendall
- Attendance: 16,108

Broadcast partners
- Broadcasters: (Australia) Nine Network; (United Kingdom) Sky Sports; (New Zealand) Māori Television

The 2020 Betfred World Club Challenge was the 28th staging of the World Club Challenge. It featured Super League champions St Helens R.F.C., and NRL winners Sydney Roosters.

This was the third time these two teams had met in the World Club Challenge, with Sydney claiming a 25–2 victory in the inaugural World Club Challenge in 1976, and a 38–0 victory in 2003. Victory over St Helens means Sydney now have a record 5 titles, and become the only team to retain their title, as well as maintaining their 100% record in the World Club Challenge.

== Background ==
=== St Helens R.F.C. ===
St Helens finished 1st in the regular season, to earn a home tie against 2nd place Wigan Warriors in the semi-finals. Saints dominated the first half by scoring 4 tries inside 20 minutes, before Wigan hit back with 1 of their own.

Saints were irresistible in the first half, and led 26–6 with tries from Theo Fages, Kevin Naiqama, Luke Thompson, and Jonny Lomax.

Wigan knew they had a job to do in the 2nd half, but this was not to be, as Saints Zeb Taia's score and a Mark Percival double extended the lead to send Saints to their first grand final in 5 years.

This was also Justin Holbrook's final game for Saints at the Totally Wicked Stadium, without losing a single home game all season.

Saints then defeated Salford 23–6 in the grand final, making them champions and qualifying them for the World Club Challenge.

He left at the end of the season to take on the vacant coaching role at Gold Coast Titans and was replaced by Kristian Woolf for the 2020 Season.

=== Sydney Roosters ===
The Roosters finished the 2019 NRL season in second place with 36 points. In their first game of the finals, they defeated the South Sydney Rabbitohs 30–6 at home, earning themselves a one week break. They then played the Melbourne Storm, again at home, and they won that match 14–6, putting them in the Grand Final. They went on to defeat the Canberra Raiders 14–8, claiming the 2019 premiership and qualifying them for the World Club Challenge.

== Match details ==
22 February

St Helens	12–20	Sydney Roosters
Tries; Thompson, Walmsley, Goals; Makinson 2/2		Tries; Tupou, Manu (2), Keary; Goals; Flanagan 0/3, Taukeiaho 2/2, 1 pen

Totally Wicked Stadium
Attendance: 16,108
Referee: Chris Kendall
Player of the Match: Luke Keary

St Helens		Position	Sydney Roosters	
22	Jack Welsby	Fullback	1	James Tedesco
2	Tommy Makinson	Wing	2	Daniel Tupou
3	Kevin Naiqama	Centre	3	Angus Crichton
20	James Bentley	Centre	4	Joseph Manu
21	Matthew Costello	Wing	5	Brett Morris
6	Jonny Lomax	Stand-off	6	Luke Keary
7	Theo Fages	Scrum-half	7	Kyle Flanagan
8	Alex Walmsley	Prop	8	Jared Waerea-Hargreaves
9	James Roby	Hooker	9	Jake Friend
10	Luke Thompson	Prop	10	Sio Siua Taukeiaho
11	Zeb Taia	Second-row	11	Sitili Tupouniua
12	Dominique Peyroux	Second-row	12	Mitchell Aubusson
15	Morgan Knowles	Loose forward	13	Victor Radley
13	Louie McCarthy-Scarsbrook	Interchange	14	Sam Verrills
15	Matty Lees	Interchange	15	Isaac Liu
18	Joseph Paulo	Interchange	16	Nat Butcher
19	Aaron Smith	Interchange	17	Lindsay Collins
	Kristian Woolf	Coach		Trent Robinson
