= 2017 Rugby League World Cup Group B =

Group B of the 2017 Rugby League World Cup is one of the four groups in the 2017 Rugby League World Cup, which began on 28 October and was completed on 11 November 2017. The group comprised New Zealand, Samoa, Scotland and Tonga. Tonga finished top of the pool while New Zealand and Samoa also qualified for the quarter-finals.

== Overall ==
Key to colours in pool tables
Advances to knockout stage and qualifies for the 2021 Rugby League World Cup

Pos	Team	Pld	W	D	L	PF	PA	PD	Pts	Qualification
1	Tonga	3	3	0	0	110	44	+66	6	Advance to knockout stage
2	New Zealand (H)	3	2	0	1	134	42	+92	4	Advance to knockout stage
3	Samoa	3	0	1	2	40	84	−44	1	Advance to knockout stage
4	Scotland	3	0	1	2	24	138	−114	1	

(H) Hosts

== New Zealand vs Samoa ==
28 October 2017
20:10 NZDT (UTC+13)

New Zealand	38–8	Samoa
Tries: Jordan Rapana (4') 1 Shaun Johnson (20') 1 Brad Takairangi (46') 1 Kodi Nikorima (52') 1 Issac Liu (55') 1 Roger Tuivasa-Sheck (68') 1 Nelson Asofa-Solomona (72') 1 Goals: Shaun Johnson 5/7 (21', 53', 56', 69', 73')	Report	Tries: 1 (37') Ken Maumalo; 1 (80') Joseph Paulo; Goals: 0/1 Peter Matautia; 0/1 Tim Lafai

Mt Smart Stadium, Auckland
Attendance: 17,857
Referee: James Child (England)
Player of the Match: Joseph Tapine (New Zealand)

Team lists:

FB	1	Roger Tuivasa-Sheck
WG	2	Dallin Watene-Zelezniak
CE	3	Gerard Beale
CE	4	Brad Takairangi
WG	5	Jordan Rapana
FE	6	Kodi Nikorima
HB	7	Shaun Johnson
PR	8	Martin Taupau
HK	9	Thomas Leuluai
PR	18	Jared Waerea-Hargreaves
SR	13	Simon Mannering
SR	12	Joseph Tapine
LK	10	Adam Blair (c)
Substitutes:
IC	14	Nelson Asofa-Solomona
IC	15	Russell Packer
IC	16	Isaac Liu
IC	17	Danny Levi
Coach:
David Kidwell

FB	1	Young Tonumaipea
WG	2	Peter Mata’utia
CE	3	Tim Lafai
CE	4	Joseph Leilua
WG	5	Ken Maumalo
FE	6	Joseph Paulo
HB	7	Ben Roberts
PR	8	Junior Paulo
HK	9	Jazz Tevaga
PR	10	Sam Lisone
SR	11	Josh Papalii
SR	12	Frank Pritchard (c)
LK	13	Leeson Ah Mau
Substitutes:
IC	14	Pita Godinet
IC	15	Herman Ese’ese
IC	16	Suaia Matagi
IC	17	Bunty Afoa
Coach:
Matt Parish

== Scotland vs Tonga ==
29 October 2017
16:15 AEDT (UTC+10)

Scotland	4–50	Tonga
Tries: Danny Addy (62') 1 Goals: Danny Brough 0/1	Report	Tries: 3 (3', 20', 40') Michael Jennings; 2 (26', 73') Daniel Tupou; 1 (17') Jason Taumalolo; 1 (23') Sika Manu; 1 (38') Peni Terepo; 1 (76') Ata Hingano; Goals: 6/7 Sio Siua Taukeiaho (4', 19', 21', 24', 75', 78'); 1/2 Ata Hingano (40')

Barlow Park, Cairns
Attendance: 9,216
Referee: Phil Bentham (England)
Player of the Match: Jason Taumalolo (Tonga)

Notes:

- Due to high humidity conditions, the game was played with quarter-time drinks breaks after the heat rule was invoked.

Team lists:

FB	1	Lewis Tierney
WG	2	Matty Russell
CE	3	Ben Hellewell
CE	4	Lachlan Stein
WG	5	Will Oakes
FE	6	Danny Brough (c)
HB	7	Danny Addy
PR	8	Luke Douglas
HK	9	Kane Bentley
PR	10	Ben Kavanagh
SR	11	Frankie Mariano
SR	12	Dale Ferguson
LK	13	James Bell
Substitutes:
IC	14	Callum Phillips
IC	15	Andrew Bentley
IC	16	Sam Brooks
IC	17	Jonathan Walker
Coach:
Steve McCormack

FB	1	William Hopoate
WG	2	Daniel Tupou
CE	3	Michael Jennings
CE	4	Konrad Hurrell
WG	5	Manu Vatuvei
FE	6	Tuimoala Lolohea
HB	7	Mafoa'aeata Hingano
PR	8	Andrew Fifita
HK	9	Siliva Havili
PR	10	Sio Siua Taukeiaho
SR	11	Manu Ma'u
SR	12	Sika Manu (c)
LK	13	Jason Taumalolo
Substitutes:
IC	14	Sione Katoa
IC	15	Sam Moa
IC	16	Peni Terepo
IC	17	Ben Murdoch-Masila
Coach:
Kristian Woolf

== New Zealand vs Scotland ==
4 November 2017
17:00 NZDT (UTC+13)

New Zealand	74–6	Scotland
Tries: Te Maire Martin (32', 52', 76') 3 Pita Hiku (39', 58', 69') 3 Jason Nightingale (13', 23') 2 Kenny Bromwich (9') 1 Joseph Tapine (16') 1 Russell Packer (43') 1 Dean Whare (55') 1 Shaun Johnson (61') 1 Elijah Taylor (79') 1 Goals: Shaun Johnson 9/14 (11', 33', 44', 53', 56', 60', 63', 70', 80')	Report	Tries: 1 (72') Oscar Thomas; Goals: 1/1 Danny Addy (73')

Christchurch Stadium, Christchurch
Attendance: 12,130
Referee: Henry Perenara (New Zealand)
Player of the Match: Roger Tuivasa-Sheck (New Zealand)

Team lists:

FB	1	Roger Tuivasa-Sheck
WG	2	Jason Nightingale
CE	3	Dean Whare
CE	4	Brad Takairangi
WG	5	Peta Hiku
FE	6	Te Maire Martin
HB	7	Shaun Johnson
PR	8	Martin Taupau
HK	9	Elijah Taylor
PR	18	Jared Waerea-Hargreaves
SR	13	Kenny Bromwich
SR	12	Joseph Tapine
LK	10	Adam Blair (c)
Substitutes:
IC	14	Nelson Asofa-Solomona
IC	15	Russell Packer
IC	16	Addin Fonua-Blake
IC	17	Danny Levi
Coach:
David Kidwell

FB	1	Alex Walker
WG	2	Lewis Tierney
CE	3	Ben Hellewell
CE	4	Lachlan Stein
WG	5	Matty Russell
FE	6	Danny Brough (c)
HB	7	Oscar Thomas
PR	8	Luke Douglas
HK	9	Danny Addy
PR	10	Ben Kavanagh
SR	11	Jarred Anderson
SR	12	Dale Ferguson
LK	13	James Bell
Substitutes:
IC	14	Kane Bentley
IC	15	Sam Brooks
IC	16	Brandan Wilkinson
IC	17	Jonathan Walker
Coach:
Steve McCormack

== Samoa vs Tonga ==
In the week leading up to the match there were several "vicious street brawls" between Samoan and Tongan supporters. This led to members of both the Tongan and Samoan teams calling for calm. 29 people were arrested for fighting after the game.

4 November 2017
19:30 NZDT (UTC+13)

Samoa	18–32	Tonga
Tries: Jazz Tevaga (17') 1 Ben Roberts (65') 1 Tim Lafai (73') 1 Goals: Tim Lafai 3/3 (18', 66', 74')	Report	Tries: 2 (10', 29') Michael Jennings; 1 (52') Peni Terepo; 1 (60') Ben Murdoch-Masila; 1 (77') Manu Ma'u; Goals: 4/4 Sio Siua Taukeiaho (11', 28' pen, 30', 79'); 2/2 Ata Hingano (53', 61')

Waikato Stadium, Hamilton
Attendance: 18,156
Referee: Ben Cummins (Australia)
Player of the Match: Andrew Fifita (Tonga)

Team lists:

FB	1	Young Tonumaipea
WG	2	Ricky Leutele
CE	3	Tim Lafai
CE	4	Joseph Leilua
WG	5	Ken Maumalo
FE	20	Jarome Luai
HB	7	Ben Roberts
PR	8	Junior Paulo
HK	9	Jazz Tevaga
PR	10	Herman Ese'ese
SR	11	Josh Papalii
SR	12	Frank Pritchard (c)
LK	13	Leeson Ah Mau
Substitutes:
IC	14	Fa'amanu Brown
IC	15	Zane Musgrove
IC	16	Sam Lisone
IC	17	Bunty Afoa
Coach:
Matt Parish

FB	1	William Hopoate
WG	2	Daniel Tupou
CE	3	Michael Jennings
CE	4	Solomone Kata
WG	5	David Fusitu'a
FE	6	Tuimoala Lolohea
HB	7	Mafoa'aeata Hingano
PR	8	Andrew Fifita
HK	14	Sione Katoa
PR	10	Sio Siua Taukeiaho
SR	11	Manu Ma'u
SR	12	Sika Manu (c)
LK	13	Jason Taumalolo
Substitutes:
IC	9	Siliva Havili
IC	15	Sam Moa
IC	16	Peni Terepo
IC	17	Ben Murdoch-Masila
Coach:
Kristian Woolf

== New Zealand vs Tonga ==
After the match, Tonga's victory was described as "the small island nation's greatest ever sporting achievement". During celebrations following the match, 53 Tongan supporters were arrested in Auckland.

11 November 2017
17:00 NZDT (UTC+13)

New Zealand	22–28	Tonga
Tries: Roger Tuivasa-Sheck (39', 72') 2 Dallin Watene-Zelezniak (21') 1 Jordan Rapana (28') 1 Goals: Shaun Johnson 3/4 (30', 40', 73')	Report	Tries: 3 (48', 59', 77') David Fusitu'a; 1 (62') Tuimoala Lolohea; 1 (65') William Hopoate; Goals: 3/4 Sio Siua Taukeiaho (7' pen, 63', 66'); 1/2 Tuimoala Lolohea (60')

Waikato Stadium, Hamilton
Attendance: 24,041
Referee: Gerard Sutton (Australia)
Player of the Match: Tuimoala Lolohea (Tonga)

Team lists:

FB	1	Roger Tuivasa-Sheck
WG	2	Dallin Watene-Zelezniak
CE	3	Dean Whare
CE	4	Brad Takairangi
WG	5	Jordan Rapana
FE	6	Kodi Nikorima
HB	7	Shaun Johnson
PR	8	Martin Taupau
HK	9	Thomas Leuluai
PR	10	Jared Waerea-Hargreaves
SR	11	Simon Mannering
SR	12	Joseph Tapine
LK	13	Adam Blair (c)
Substitutes:
IC	14	Nelson Asofa-Solomona
IC	15	Russell Packer
IC	16	Isaac Liu
IC	17	Danny Levi
Coach:
David Kidwell

FB	1	William Hopoate
WG	2	Daniel Tupou
CE	18	Mahe Fonua
CE	4	Konrad Hurrell
WG	5	David Fusitu'a
FE	6	Tuimoala Lolohea
HB	7	Mafoa'aeata Hingano
PR	8	Andrew Fifita
HK	9	Sione Katoa
PR	10	Sio Siua Taukeiaho
SR	11	Manu Ma'u
SR	12	Sika Manu (c)
LK	13	Jason Taumalolo
Substitutes:
IC	14	Siliva Havili
IC	16	Peni Terepo
IC	17	Ben Murdoch-Masila
IC	21	Tevita Pangai Junior
Coach:
Kristian Woolf

Notes:

- This was New Zealand's first loss on home soil since 2012, when they lose to Australia in Auckland at Eden Park.
- This was the first time a tier two nation had defeated Australia, England or New Zealand in a World Cup match.

== Samoa vs Scotland ==
11 November 2017
17:00 AEDT (UTC+10)

Samoa	14–14	Scotland
Tries: Junior Paulo (12') 1 Matthew Wright (49') 1 Young Tonumaipea (66') 1 Goals: Matthew Wright 1/3 (13')	Report	Tries: 1 (5') Lewis Tierney; 1 (28') Frankie Mariano; Goals: 3/4 Danny Addy (6', 18' pen, 30')

Barlow Park, Cairns
Attendance: 4,309
Referee: Ashley Klein (Australia)
Player of the Match: Danny Addy (Scotland)

Team lists:

FB	1	Young Tonumaipea
WG	2	Ricky Leutele
CE	3	Tim Lafai
CE	4	Joseph Leilua
WG	5	Matthew Wright
FE	6	Jarome Luai
HB	7	Fa'amanu Brown
PR	8	Junior Paulo
HK	9	Jazz Tevaga
PR	10	Herman Ese’ese
SR	11	Josh Papalii
SR	12	Frank Winterstein
LK	13	Bunty Afoa
Substitutes:
IC	14	Pita Godinet
IC	15	Joseph Paulo
IC	16	Leeson Ah Mau
IC	17	Sam Tagataese
Coach:
Matt Parish

FB	1	Lewis Tierney
WG	2	Shane Toal
CE	3	Ben Hellewell
CE	4	Lachlan Stein
WG	5	Matty Russell
FE	6	Danny Addy
HB	7	Oscar Thomas
PR	8	Luke Douglas (c)
HK	9	Callum Phillips
PR	10	Ben Kavanagh
SR	11	Frankie Mariano
SR	12	Dale Ferguson
LK	13	James Bell
Substitutes:
IC	14	Kane Bentley
IC	15	Brandan Wilkinson
IC	16	Andrew Bentley
IC	17	Jarred Anderson
Coach:
Steve McCormack
