= 2016 NRL Under-20s season =

- Teams: 16

The 2016 NRL Under-20s season (known commercially as the 2016 Holden Cup due to sponsorship from Holden) was the ninth season of the National Rugby League's Under-20s competition. The draw and structure of the competition mirrored that of the NRL's 2016 Telstra Premiership season.

== Ladder ==
2016 NYC season
Pos	Team	Pld	W	D	L	B	PF	PA	PD	Pts
1	Penrith Panthers	24	18	2	4	2	851	382	+469	42
2	North Queensland Cowboys	24	16	1	7	2	770	520	+250	37
3	St George Illawarra Dragons	24	15	1	8	2	737	545	+192	35
4	Cronulla-Sutherland Sharks	24	15	1	8	2	670	607	+63	35
5	Sydney Roosters (P)	24	14	1	9	2	710	642	+68	33
6	Wests Tigers	24	12	4	8	2	680	541	+139	32
7	Parramatta Eels	24	14	0	10	2	579	562	+17	32
8	Canberra Raiders	24	13	1	10	2	608	694	-86	31
9	Brisbane Broncos	24	11	1	12	2	660	576	+84	27
10	Newcastle Knights	24	11	1	12	2	589	678	-89	27
11	Canterbury-Bankstown Bulldogs	24	9	1	14	2	604	694	-90	23
12	Melbourne Storm	24	8	2	14	2	700	758	-58	22
13	Gold Coast Titans	24	9	0	15	2	627	698	-71	22
14	New Zealand Warriors	24	8	1	15	2	466	680	-214	20
15	South Sydney Rabbitohs	24	7	0	17	2	468	742	-274	18
16	Manly Warringah Sea Eagles	24	3	1	20	2	483	883	-400	11

=== Ladder Progression ===
Numbers highlighted in green indicate that the team finished the round inside the top 8.

== Finals Series ==
Home	Score	Away	Match Information
Home	Score	Away	Date and Time (Local)	Venue	Referees	Crowd
QUALIFYING & ELIMINATION FINALS
North Queensland Cowboys	30 – 34	St George Illawarra Dragons†	9 September 2016, 5:15 pm	Suncorp Stadium		43,170 (CR)
Sydney Roosters	48 – 0	Canberra Raiders	10 September 2016, 2:55 pm	GIO Stadium Canberra		25,592 (CR)
Wests Tigers	54 – 24	Parramatta Eels	11 September 2016, 11:10 am	Allianz Stadium		21,233 (CR)
Penrith Panthers	28 – 6	Cronulla Sutherland Sharks	11 September 2016, 1:30 pm	Allianz Stadium		22,631 (CR)
SEMI FINALS
North Queensland Cowboys	32 – 16	Wests Tigers	16 September 2016, 5:15 pm	1300SMILES Stadium
Cronulla-Sutherland Sharks	18 – 28	Sydney Roosters	17 September 2016, 5:15 pm	GIO Stadium Canberra
PRELIMINARY FINALS
Penrith Panthers	32 – 16	North Queensland Cowboys	23 September 2016, 2:55 pm	Allianz Stadium
St. George Illawarra Dragons	20 – 26	Sydney Roosters	23 September 2016, 5:15 pm	Allianz Stadium

† Match decided in extra time.

== Grand final ==
=== Teams ===
Team details
Penrith Panthers		Position	Sydney Roosters
Name	Number	Position	Number	Name
Dylan Edwards	1	Fullback	1	Kiah Cooper
Ratu Tuisese	2	Wing	2	Johnny Tuivasa-Sheck
Christian Crichton	3	Centre	3	Joseph Manu
Braidon Burns	4	Centre	4	Jarred Anderson
Daniel Brown	5	Wing	5	Bernard Lewis
Tyrone May	6	Five eighth	6	Paul Momirovski
Soni Luke	7	Half back	7	Jesse Marschke
Cowan Epere	8	Prop forward	8	Poasa Faamausili
Wayde Egan	9	Hooker	9	Grant Garvey (c)
Oliver Clark	10	Prop forward	10	Ben Thomas
Kaide Ellis	11	Second row	11	Reuben Porter
Corey Waddell	12	Second row	12	Victor Radley
Reed Izzard (c)	13	Lock forward	13	Nat Butcher (c)
Dean Blore	14	Interchange	14	Jarrett Boland
Liam Martin	15	Interchange	15	Brendan Frei
Thompson Tuigamala	16	Interchange	16	Sukamanu Raki
Jack Nelson	17	Interchange	17	Sitili Tupouniua
Cameron Ciraldo		Coach		Anthony Barnes
RLP

=== Scoreboard ===
2016 Holden Cup NRL-Under 20s Grand Final

Sunday, 2 October
13:35 AEDT (UTC+11)

Penrith Panthers U20s	28 – 30	Sydney Roosters U20s
Tries: 5 Crichton 16'; Waddell 21'; Burns 24'; Ellis 34'; Egan 38'; Goals: 4 Edwards 17', 22', 35', 39' (4/6)	1st: 28–6; 2nd: 0–24; Report	Tries: 5 Manu 8', 65'; Butcher 43'; Tupouniua 49'; Tuivasa-Sheck 73'; Goals: 5 Marschke 10', 44', 51', 66', 74' (5/5)

ANZ Stadium, Sydney
Referees: Ziggy Przeklasa-Adamski, Drew Oultram
Jack Gibson Medal: Nat Butcher (Sydney)
