= Ben Thomas (rugby league) =

Australian rugby league footballer (born 1997)

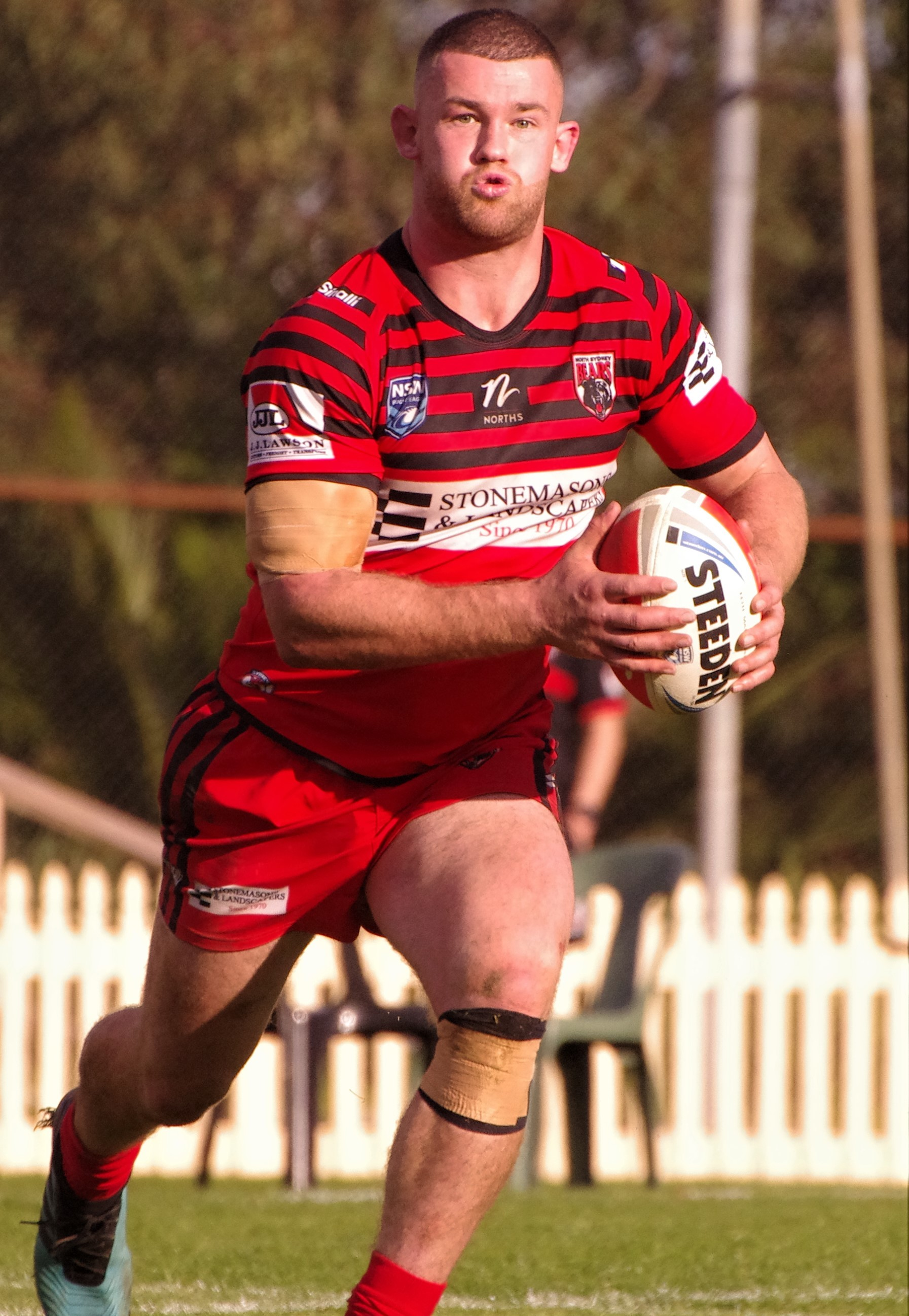

Personal information
- Full name: Benjamin Thomas
- Born: 10 December 1997 (age 28) Central Coast, New South Wales, Australia
- Height: 184 cm (6 ft 0 in)
- Weight: 104 kg (16 st 5 lb)

Playing information
- Position: Prop
Club
Years	Team	Pld	T	G	FG	P
2021–23	Sydney Roosters	7	0	0	0	0
- Source: As of 17 November 2026

Ben Thomas (born 10 December 1997) is an Australian professional rugby league footballer who plays as a prop forward.

He previously played for the Sydney Roosters in the National Rugby League (NRL).

== Background ==
He played his junior rugby league for the Kincumber Colts.

== Playing career ==
Thomas played under 20s for the Sydney Roosters in 2016 and 2017. Ben started in the front row in the Sydney Roosters 2016 Holden Cup premiership winning side that beat the Penrith Panthers 30–28. Thomas played for the Wyong Roos, Newcastle and North Sydney in the NSW Cup. In round 14 of the 2021 NRL season, Thomas made his first grade debut for the Sydney Roosters against the Gold Coast. On 21 September 2023, it was announced that Thomas had been released by the Sydney Roosters. On 24 September 2023, Thomas played for North Sydney in their 2023 NSW Cup grand final loss against South Sydney. On 11 February 2025, Thomas signed a contract to join Central Coast side the Kincumber Colts.
