= Sitili Tupouniua =

Tonga international rugby league footballer

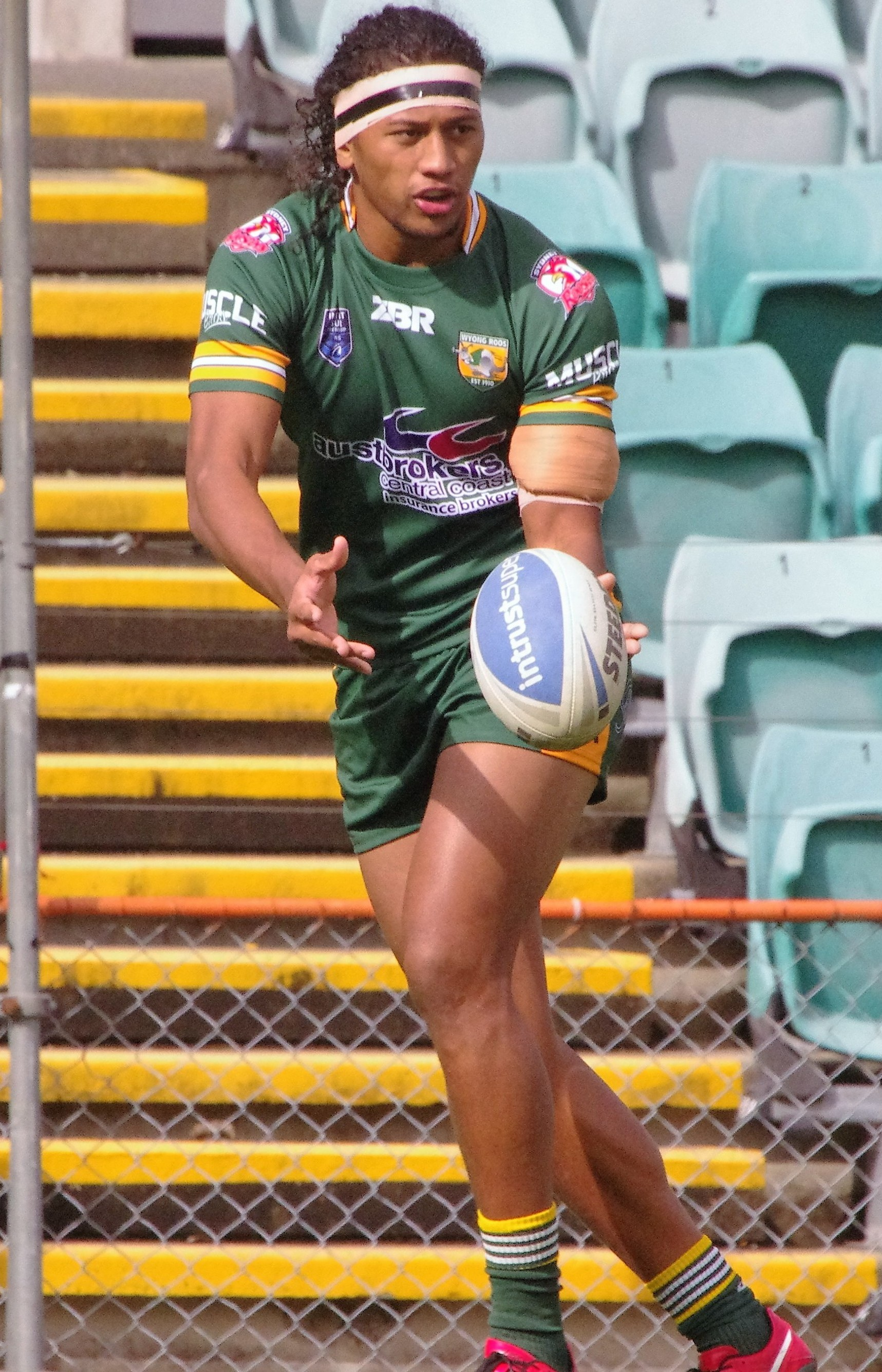

Personal information
- Born: 30 May 1997 (age 29) Auckland, New Zealand
- Height: 186 cm (6 ft 1 in)
- Weight: 101 kg (15 st 13 lb)

Playing information
- Position: Second-row
Club
Years	Team	Pld	T	G	FG	P
2018–24	Sydney Roosters	106	33	0	0	132
2025–	Canterbury Bulldogs	27	7	0	0	28
	Total	133	40	0	0	160
Representative
Years	Team	Pld	T	G	FG	P
2019–24	Tonga	5	0	0	0	0
- Source: As of 7 August 2026

Sitili Tupouniua (born 30 May 1997) is a Tonga international rugby league footballer from New Zealand who plays as a second-row forward for the Canterbury-Bankstown Bulldogs in the National Rugby League (NRL).

Tupouniua previously played for the Sydney Roosters with whom he won the 2020 World Club Challenge.

== Background ==
Tupouniua was born in Auckland, New Zealand, and is of Tongan descent.

Tupouniua played his junior rugby league for the Marist Saints. He played in the Sydney Roosters’ Holden Cup side from 2016-2017, including in the Sydney Roosters’ 2016 Holden Cup premiership winning team.

== Playing career ==
=== 2018 ===
Tupouniua made his first grade debut for the Sydney Roosters in round 16 of the 2018 NRL season against the Melbourne Storm at Adelaide Oval.

=== 2019 ===
Tupouniua scored his first try in the top grade against the Canterbury Bulldogs in round 14 of the 2019 NRL season at the Sydney Cricket Ground.

Tupouniua featured for North Sydney, the Sydney Roosters feeder club in the 2019 Canterbury Cup NSW finals series. Tupouniua scored 2 tries in North Sydney's elimination final defeat by Newtown at Leichhardt Oval.

=== 2020 ===
Tupouniua scored his first try of the 2020 NRL season in round 9 as the Sydney Roosters defeated North Queensland 42–16 at Queensland Country Bank Stadium.

He made a total of 20 appearances in the 2020 season as the Roosters reached the finals but were eliminated by Canberra ending their quest for a third straight premiership.

In December 2020, he signed a contract extension keeping him with the Roosters until the end of the 2024 season.

=== 2021 ===
He played a total of 24 games for the Sydney Roosters in the 2021 NRL season including the club's two finals matches. The Roosters were eliminated from the second week of the finals losing to Manly 42-6.

=== 2022 ===
In round 18 of the 2022 NRL season, Tupouniua was taken from the field during the Sydney Roosters 54-26 victory over St. George Illawarra with a knee injury. It was later announced that Tupounia would miss the remainder of the 2022 NRL season with an ACL injury.

=== 2023 ===
He played eight matches for the Sydney Roosters in the 2023 NRL season as the club finished 7th on the table and qualified for the finals.

=== 2024 ===
On 1 July, Tupouniua would sign a four-year deal to join Canterbury from 2025 onwards. He played a total of 21 matches for the Roosters in the 2024 NRL season including their preliminary final loss against Melbourne.

=== 2025 ===
In round 1 of the 2025 NRL season, he made his club debut for Canterbury in their 28-20 victory over St. George Illawarra scoring two tries. He was limited to just 12 games for Canterbury in the 2025 NRL season as the club finished fourth and qualified for the finals. Canterbury would be eliminated from the finals in straight sets.

=== 2026 ===
On 11 August, it was announced that Tupouniua would miss the remainder of the 2026 NRL season with a hamstring injury.

== Statistics ==
Year	Team	Games	Tries	Pts
2018	Sydney Roosters	1		
2019	Sydney Roosters	16	1	4
2020	Sydney Roosters	20	5	20
2021	Sydney Roosters	24	12	48
2022	Sydney Roosters	16	7	28
2023	Sydney Roosters	8	1	4
2024	Sydney Roosters	21	7	28
2025	Canterbury-Bankstown Bulldogs	12	3	12
2026	Canterbury-Bankstown Bulldogs	15	4	16
	Totals	133	40	160
