= Lachlan Stein =

Scotland international rugby league footballer

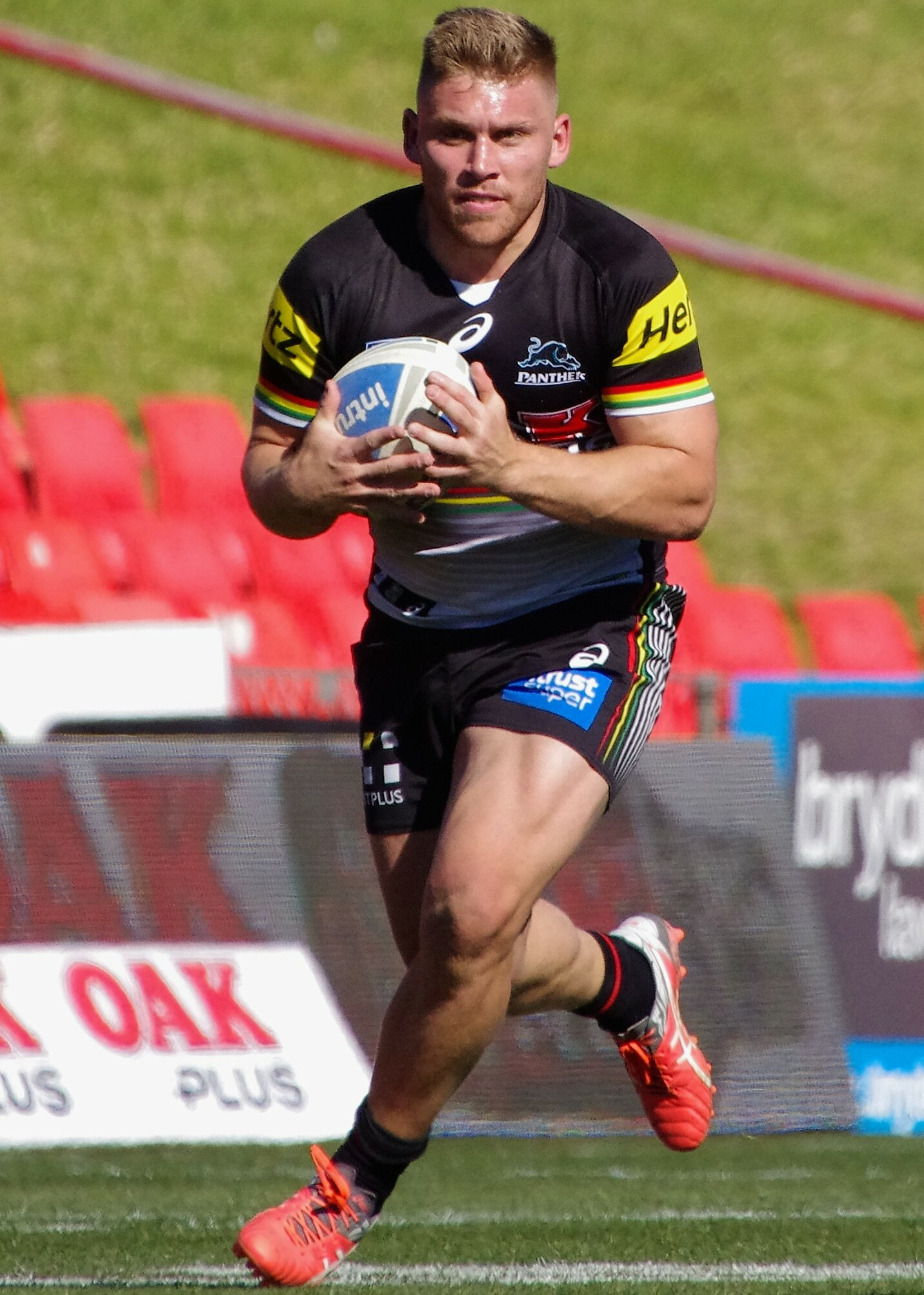

Personal information
- Born: 27 July 1996 (age 29) Wollongong, New South Wales, Australia
- Height: 176 cm (5 ft 9 in)
- Weight: 97 kg (15 st 4 lb)

Playing information
- Position: Wing, Centre
Club
Years	Team	Pld	T	G	FG	P
	Glebe-Burwood Wolves
Representative
Years	Team	Pld	T	G	FG	P
2017	Scotland	3	0	0	0	0
- Source: As of 4 March 2018

Lachlan Stein is a Scotland international rugby league footballer who plays for the Glebe-Burwood Wolves in the Ron Massey Cup, he has played at representative level for Scotland in the 2017 World Cup, and at club level for Penrith Panthers, as a wing, or centre.

== Background ==
Stein was born in Wollongong, New South Wales, Australia.

== Playing career ==
After playing junior football for the Thirroul Butchers, Stein played for the St George Illawarra Dragons, and the Cronulla-Sutherland Sharks in the 2015 Holden Cup. He then moved to the Penrith Panthers where he played in the NSW Cup.

He was named in the Scottish squad for the 2017 Rugby League World Cup.

In 2019, Stein joined Ron Massey Cup side the Glebe-Burwood Wolves. On 6 May 2019, Stein was selected for the Ron Massey Cup representative side to play against Newcastle Rebels.
