= Jarred Anderson =

Scotland international rugby league footballer

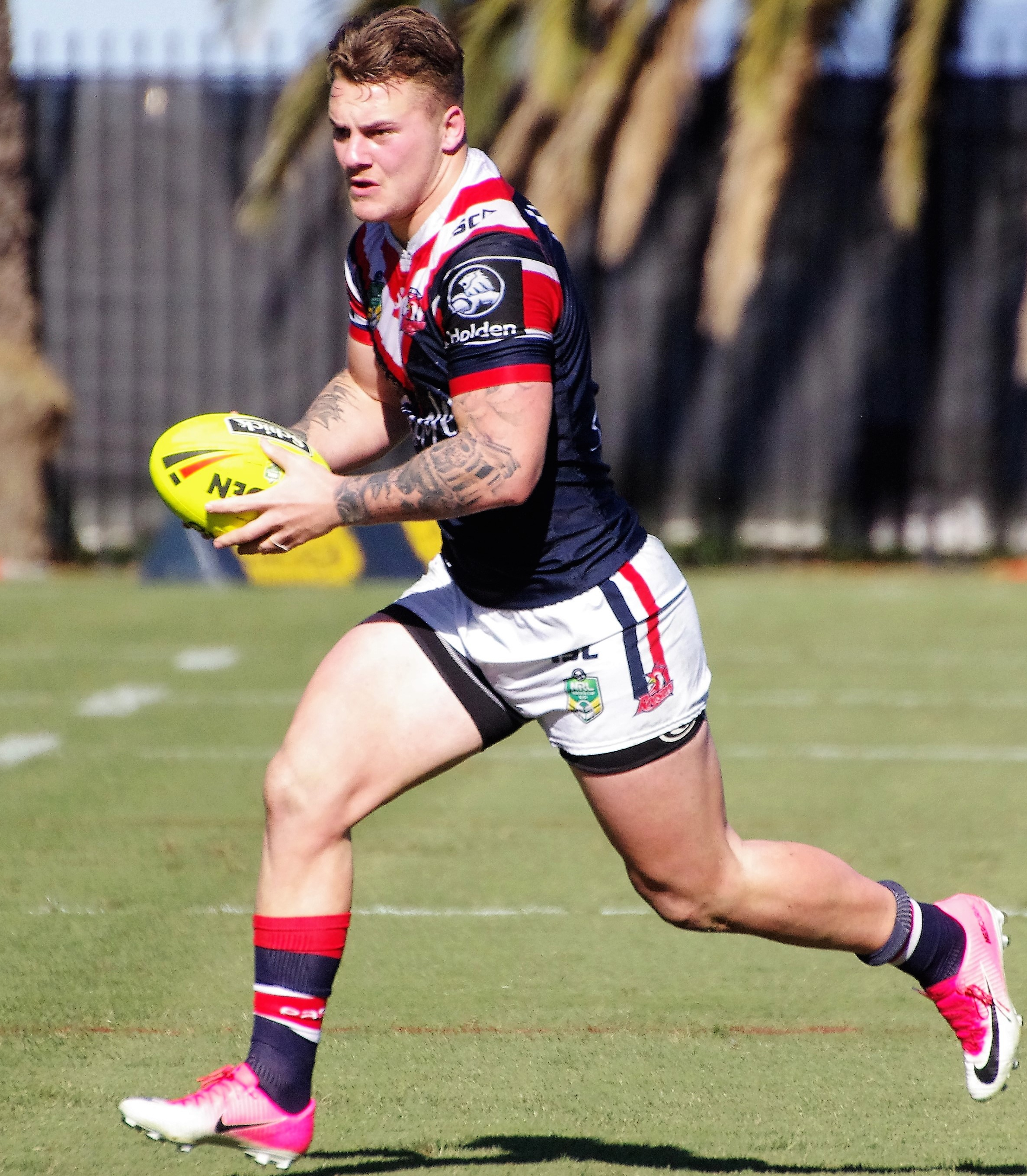

Personal information
- Born: 24 August 1997 (age 28) Maitland, New South Wales, Australia
- Height: 6 ft 2 in (187 cm)
- Weight: 16 st 3 lb (103 kg)

Playing information
- Position: Second-row
Representative
| Years | Team | Pld | T | G | FG | P |
|---|---|---|---|---|---|---|
| 2017 | Scotland | 2 | 0 | 0 | 0 | 0 |
- Source: As of 4 March 2018

Jarred Anderson (born 24 August 1997) is a Scotland international rugby league footballer who played as a second-row forward for the Canterbury-Bankstown Bulldogs in the NRL.

== Background ==
Anderson was born in Maitland, New South Wales, Australia.

== Playing career ==
Anderson attended Hunter Sports High School and played his junior rugby league for the Raymond Terrace Roosters and the Kurri Kurri Bulldogs. He then played for the Sydney Roosters in the Under-20s Holden Cup in 2016 and 2017. Anderson playing in the centres in the Sydney Roosters’ 2016 Holden Cup premiership winning team.

He was selected for Scotland at the 2017 Rugby League World Cup. He qualified for Scotland through his grandmother.

On 29 November, after World Cup duties, Anderson signed a three-year deal with the Canterbury-Bankstown Bulldogs.
