= Victor Radley =

England international rugby league footballer

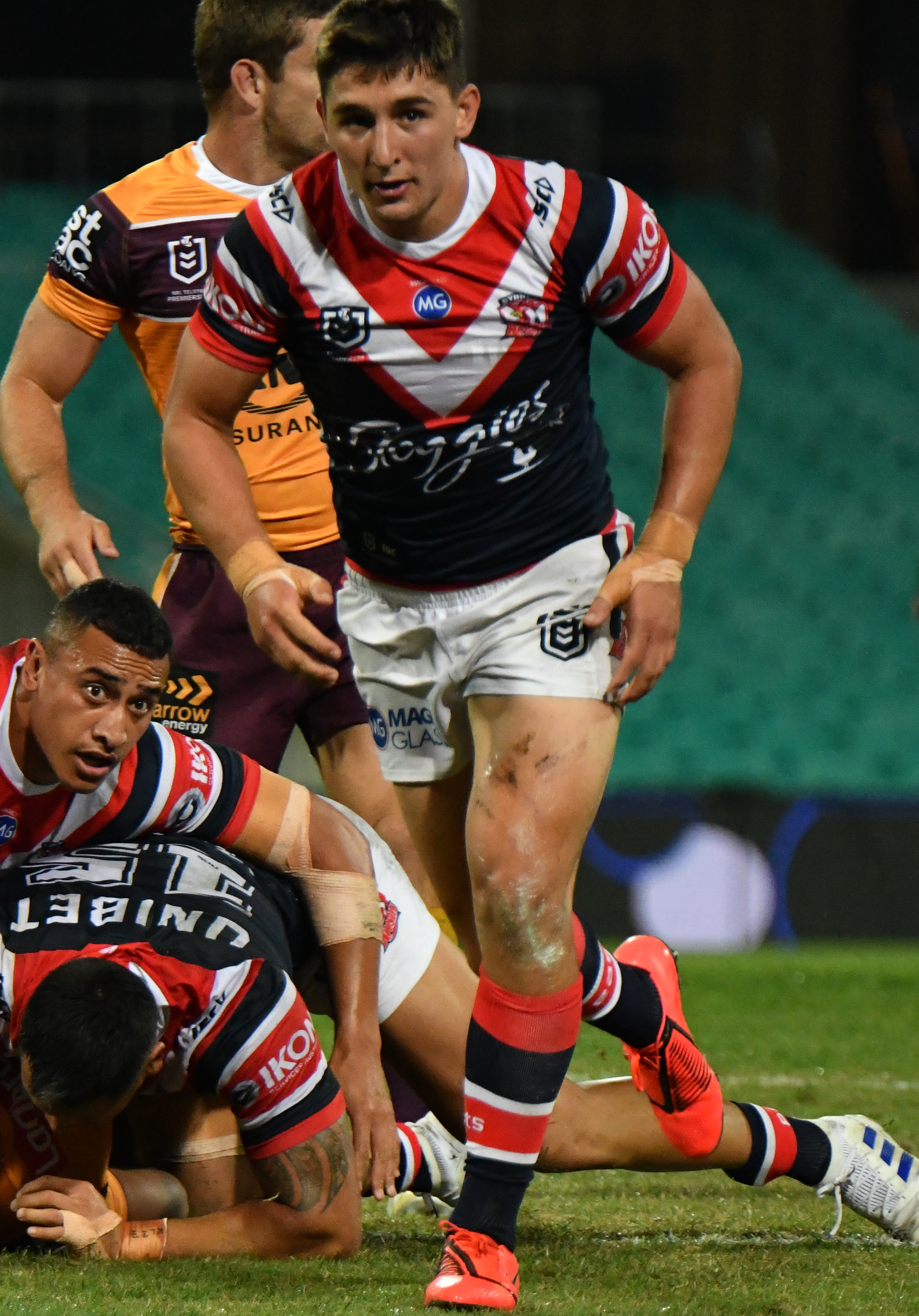

Personal information
- Full name: Victor Derrick Radley
- Born: 14 March 1998 (age 28) Sydney, New South Wales, Australia
- Height: 182 cm (6 ft 0 in)
- Weight: 92 kg (14 st 7 lb)

Playing information
- Position: Lock, Second-row, Hooker
Club
Years	Team	Pld	T	G	FG	P
2017–	Sydney Roosters	181	28	0	0	112
Representative
Years	Team	Pld	T	G	FG	P
2022–	England	11	3	0	0	12
2026	New South Wales	2	0	0	0	0
- Source: As of 16 November 2026

Victor Derrick Radley (born 14 March 1998) is an England international rugby league footballer who plays for the Sydney Roosters in the NRL. He won back-to-back NRL premierships with the Sydney Roosters in 2018 and 2019 and a third premiership in 2026. Radley is commonly dubbed as “Victor the Inflictor”, for his hard and effective tackling style.

== Background ==
Radley was born in Sydney, New South Wales, Australia and raised in Bronte. He grew up playing rugby union and is of English descent through his father Nigel.

== Club career ==
=== Early career ===
In 2016 and 2017, Radley played for the Sydney Roosters' NYC team. In October 2016, he played in the Roosters' NYC Grand Final win over the Penrith Panthers.

=== 2017 ===
In May, Radley played for the Junior Kangaroos against the Junior Kiwis, before playing for the New South Wales under-20s team against the Queensland under-20s team later that month.

In round 20 of the 2017 NRL season, he made his NRL debut for the Roosters against the Newcastle Knights. In September, he was named on the interchange bench in the NYC Team of the Year.

=== 2018 ===
In Round 3 against the Newcastle Knights, Radley scored his first NRL career try in the 38–8 win at Sydney Football Stadium. In round 9 against Manly, Radley earned the nickname "Victor the Inflictor" after he pulled off two try saving tackles on Martin Taupau and Dylan Walker as the Roosters held on to walk away with a 22–20 win at Sydney Football Stadium.

In 2018, Radley made 25 appearances for Eastern Suburbs as the club won their fourth minor premiership in six seasons. On 30 September, Radley played in Easts 21–6 victory over Melbourne in the 2018 NRL Grand Final. In the post match interview, Radley was speaking with Andrew Johns who asked Radley what he had planned for the celebrations, Radley famously replied "Beers, beers and more beers, I cannot wait".

=== 2019 ===
In round 23, Radley played his 50th NRL game for the Sydney Roosters, scoring a try in their 34–12 win over the St George Illawarra Dragons at Netstrata Jubilee Stadium. Radley played in the club's 2019 NRL Grand Final victory over Canberra at ANZ Stadium.

=== 2020 ===
In round 7 of the 2020 NRL season, Radley was taken from the field with an ACL injury in the Sydney Roosters' 26–12 victory over St. George at Bankwest Stadium that later ruled him out for the rest of the year.

=== 2021 ===
On March 10, Radley was suspended for two matches and fined $20,000 by the NRL for an incident that happened in December 2020. Radley was alleged to have tackled a man at a house party in Byron Bay. In round 11 of the 2021 NRL season, Radley was sin-binned twice and placed on report a further two times in the Sydney Roosters' 34–16 loss against Brisbane. Radley was later suspended for five games as a result of the tackles he produced against Brisbane, costing him a potential State of Origin debut.

On 15 June, Radley was removed from a flight that was due to depart the Gold Coast for allegedly being intoxicated. The following day, Sydney Roosters head coach Trent Robinson spoke to the media and said "It’s not what we want from our players. Just don’t do it. Just act like a man in public and behave yourself. It’s pretty simple".

On 16 August, Radley was suspended for two matches by the NRL after being placed on report during the Sydney Roosters victory over Brisbane in round 22 for dangerous contact.

Radley played a total of 20 games for the Sydney Roosters in the 2021 NRL season, including the club's two finals matches. The Sydney Roosters would be eliminated from the second week of the finals losing to Manly 42–6.

=== 2022 ===
On 19 June, Radley was selected by New South Wales for the game two of the 2022 State of Origin series. Radley took no part in the match as he was named in the preliminary squad. In the post-match celebrations following New South Wales' victory, Radley was caught on CCTV cameras in the dressing room mimicking a sex act on teammate Joseph Suaalii. NRL CEO Andrew Abdo issued Radley for an explanation over the incident. In the elimination final against South Sydney, Radley was sin binned twice in the Sydney Roosters 30–14 loss that ended their season.

=== 2023 ===
In round 6 of the 2023 NRL season, Radley was sent to the sin bin and placed on report for an illegal tackle on Melbourne's Cameron Munster during the clubs 28–8 loss. In round 8, Radley was sent to the sin bin for a third consecutive week during the Sydney Roosters 27–26 victory over St. George Illawarra in the ANZAC Day game. Radley played 21 matches for the Sydney Roosters in the 2023 NRL season as the club finished 7th on the table and qualified for the finals. Radley played in both of the clubs finals games as they were eliminated in the second week against Melbourne.

=== 2024 ===
Radley played 23 matches for the Sydney Roosters in the 2024 NRL season scoring seven tries. Radley played in all three finals games for the club as they were eliminated at the preliminary final stage against Melbourne.

=== 2025 ===
In round 9 of the 2025 NRL season, Radley scored two tries in the Sydney Roosters 36-26 victory over the Dolphins. On 26 August, Radley was named as one of the players who had been allegedly involved with former teammate Brandon Smith as he was charged with supplying dangerous drugs and using or disclosing inside knowledge for betting. Queensland Police allege that Smith unlawfully supplied a dangerous drug (cocaine) to Radley on 7 June while he was in the town of Currimundi. Radley's club released a statement which read "The Sydney Roosters are aware of speculation in the press that references a report we have not seen involving (among others) a Roosters player, with allegations due to be heard in court next month, the club will be making no further comment until the conclusion of that aspect of the legal process. The Sydney Roosters have procedures in place to deal with the sorts of allegations made in today's written media and on TV. We will address the matter once the facts have been established via the judicial system. When in possession of the facts, the Sydney Roosters will take any necessary action, including any action available to us to defend our proud name. It is what our fans, staff, players and sponsors demand of us. The club has been in contact with the NRL Integrity Unit".

In September 2025, it was alleged by Queensland Police that they had obtained text messages between Radley and Smith in relation to supplying drugs. One of the messages released to the media came from Radley where he sent to Smith saying “G tee up your cousin in sunny coast for me. Little short ball, Short 8 ball if you will". Smith then replied “Yeah, sweet, bro". It was alleged that Smith then sent Radley a number for a drug dealer with a message saying “Just call him that’s xxxxx from Goldie number. He’s got people in sunny coast he said to call him and he will give you number". After this it was alleged that Radley sent messages to the unnamed drug dealer with one message reading “All good bro, you sorted us good, man. Let me know if you need anything and I will sort it for you". On 17 September 2025, the Sydney Roosters informed Radley's management to explore his options as they wanted to avoid an un-fair dismissal claim.

On 18 September, the Roosters announced that Radley would be suspended for 10 games without pay and he was fined $30,000 for bringing the game into disrepute, the fine would be donated to the St Vincent's Hospital (Cancer Research). The sanction was the greatest in the club's history. Radley apologised for his actions, fully accepting responsibility for his actions.

=== 2026 ===
He made his New South Wales debut in Game 1 of the 2026 State of Origin on 27 May 2026, coming off the bench, and becoming the first person to have represented both England and New South Wales. Radley played 20 matches for the Sydney Roosters in the 2026 NRL season including the clubs 2026 NRL Grand Final victory over Newcastle.

== International career ==
=== Australia U-23 ===
On 7 October 2019, Radley was named at lock for the U23 Junior Australian side.

=== England ===
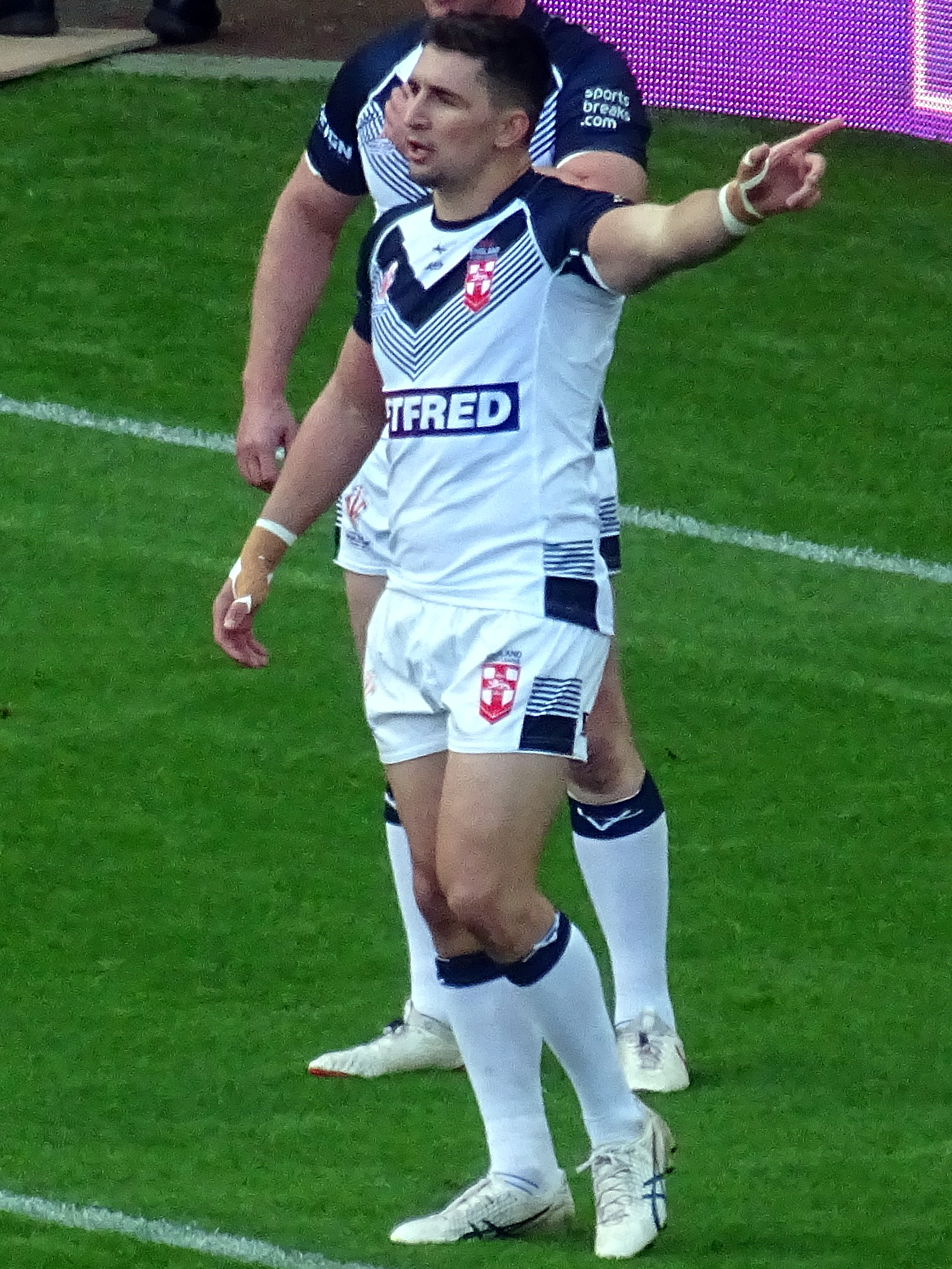
Radley playing for England in 2022

In October he was named in the England squad for the 2021 Rugby League World Cup. On 15 October, Radley made his England debut against Samoa in the 2021 Rugby League World Cup as England won the match 60–6. Radley played in all five matches for England at the tournament as they reached the semi-finals before losing to Samoa 27–26. On 14 November 2022, the Rugby Football League placed Radley under investigation after he was alleged to have been involved in a fight with Leeds player James Bentley at England's team hotel. In November he was named in the 2021 RLWC Team of the Tournament.

In September 2025, Radley ruled himself out of England's Ashes squad, following his domestic ban imposed by his club after being investigated for supplying illegal substances.

== Statistics ==
Year	Team	Games	Tries	Pts
2017	Sydney Roosters	3		
2018	Sydney Roosters	25	3	12
2019	Sydney Roosters	27	6	24
2020	Sydney Roosters	7	1	4
2021	Sydney Roosters	16	1	4
2022	Sydney Roosters	19	2	8
2023	Sydney Roosters	21	2	8
2024	Sydney Roosters	23	7	28
2025	Sydney Roosters	20	4	16
2026	Sydney Roosters	19	2	8
2027	Sydney Roosters			
	Totals	181	28	112

source;
