= 2019 NRL Grand Final =

Deciding game of the 2019 NRL season

Sydney Roosters	Canberra Raiders
14	8
	1	2	Total
SYD	8	6	14
CAN	6	2	8
- Date: 6 October 2019
- Stadium: ANZ Stadium
- Location: Sydney, New South Wales, Australia
- Clive Churchill Medal: Jack Wighton
- Australian National anthem: Natalie Bassingthwaighte
- Referee: Ben Cummins; Gerard Sutton; Nick Beashel (Touch Judge); Chris Butler (Touch Judge)
- Attendance: 82,922

Broadcast partners
- Broadcasters: Nine Network (Live); Fox League (Delayed)
- Commentators: Ray Warren Peter Sterling Andrew Johns Brad Fittler Johnathan Thurston Billy Slater

The 2019 NRL Grand Final was the conclusive and premiership-deciding game of the 2019 National Rugby League season and was played at Sydney's ANZ Stadium. The match was contested between defending premiers the Sydney Roosters and the Canberra Raiders. The match was won by the Sydney Roosters 14–8 in a tight contest to claim their 15th premiership title, making them the first club in 26 years to win consecutive premierships in a unified competition since the Brisbane Broncos in 1993, and the first Sydney Roosters side to win consecutive titles since 1975. The Clive Churchill Medal was awarded to Raiders five-eighth Jack Wighton as the game's man of the match.

The game is one of the most controversial grand finals, infamous for a reversed "six again" decision by referee Ben Cummins which preceded the winning try.

== Background ==
Sydney finished second on the premiership ladder with a record of 17–7. The club comfortably defeated South Sydney 30–6 to qualify for the preliminary final, then defeated minor premiers Melbourne 14–6 in the preliminary final to qualify for the grand final. Having won the 2018 premiership, the Roosters were aiming to win back-to-back premierships, and become the first team since the Brisbane Broncos in the 1992-93 NSWRL to do so in a unified competition. Trent Robinson coached the side to its third grand final in his seventh year coaching the Roosters.

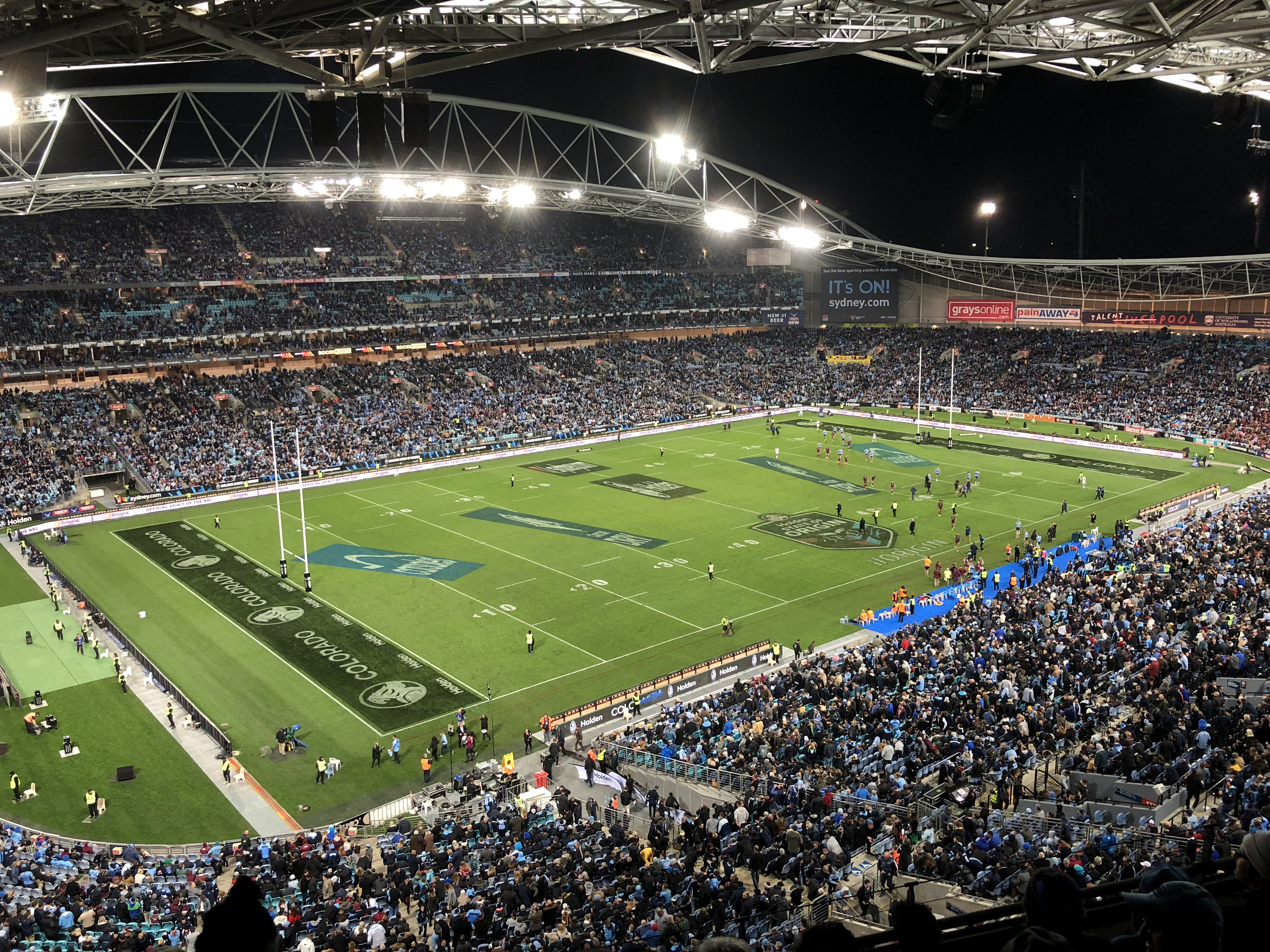
ANZ Stadium, where the match was played

Canberra finished fourth on the premiership ladder with a 15–9 record. The club won through to the grand final with a 12–10 win over Melbourne in the qualifying final, then a 16–10 win over South Sydney in the preliminary final. It was the club's first grand final appearance since 1994, breaking the longest drought of appearances in club history. Raiders coach Ricky Stuart was coaching his first grand final for Canberra in his sixth year with the club; it was his fourth grand final as a coach overall, having led the Roosters to the game in 2002, 2003 and 2004.

It was the first time the Sydney Roosters and the Canberra Raiders contested a Grand Final. The sides faced each other twice during the season, with the Roosters winning both games: a 30–24 win in round 9 on the neutral Suncorp Stadium during Magic Round, and a 22–18 win at GIO Stadium in round 21.

== Pre-match ==
=== Broadcasting ===
The match was broadcast live on the Nine Network and delayed on Fox League in Australia and Sky Sport in New Zealand. Radio broadcasters include ABC, Triple M, 2GB, SEN and Koori Radio.

=== Curtain-raiser matches ===
Curtain-raiser matches on the day will include two matches

=== Entertainment ===
Game-day entertainment will be headlined by OneRepublic, Darryl Braithwaite and Christine Anu

== Teams ==
Sydney Roosters	Position	Canberra Raiders
James Tedesco	Fullback	Charnze Nicoll-Klokstad
Daniel Tupou	Wing	Nick Cotric
Latrell Mitchell	Centre	Jarrod Croker (c)
Joseph Manu	Centre	Joseph Leilua
Brett Morris	Wing	Jordan Rapana
Luke Keary	Five-eighth	Jack Wighton
Cooper Cronk	Halfback	Aidan Sezer
Jared Waerea-Hargreaves	Prop	Josh Papalii
Sam Verrills	Hooker	Josh Hodgson (c)
Isaac Liu	Prop	Sia Soliola
Boyd Cordner (c)	2nd Row	John Bateman
Mitchell Aubusson	2nd Row	Elliott Whitehead
Victor Radley	Lock	Joseph Tapine
Angus Crichton	Interchange	Bailey Simonsson
Nat Butcher	Interchange	Emre Guler
Sio Siua Taukeiaho	Interchange	Corey Horsburgh
Jake Friend	Interchange	Dunamis Lui
Trent Robinson	Coach	Ricky Stuart

Sydney	Canberra

Brett Morris, Sam Verrills, Angus Crichton, Nat Butcher were the only new additions to the Roosters' grand final winning squad from the previous year. For the Canberra Raiders, all but one of their players played in their first NRL grand final, with centre Joseph Leilua having played for the Roosters in the 2010 Premiership decider; their second-row forward John Bateman had their most first grade grand final experience, having played in four Super League grand finals for the Wigan Warriors.

Sydney Roosters halfback Cooper Cronk was playing his 372nd and final game (323 of which were for the Melbourne Storm), retiring as the second most-capped NRL player in the competition's history. The match was his ninth first grade grand final, making him the first player since Ron Coote in 1975 to reach that mark; only Norm Provan and Brian Clay had played in more grand finals, with ten apiece. Having won premierships with Melbourne in 2017 and Sydney in 2018 and 2019, he became the first player since nine members of the Parramatta Eels 1981–83 teams to be involved in three straight premiership victories. (Note: Peter Sterling, Brett Kenny, Ray Price, Steve Edge, Mick Cronin, Steve Ella, Eric Grothe, Paul Taylor and Steve Sharp were present in all three of Parramatta's premiership wins.)

=== Officials ===
The officiating team, comprising two referees, two touch judges, two review officials and a stand-by in each position is given below. All four on-field officials, Ben Cummins, Gerard Sutton, Nick Beashel and Chris Butler, had officiated in previous NRL grand finals.

Position			Stand-By
Referees:	Ben Cummins (5)	Gerard Sutton (5)	Grant Atkins
Touch Judges:	Nick Beashel (3)	Chris Butler (2)	David Munro
Bunker:	Jared Maxwell	Ben Galea	

Numbers in brackets represent the number of grand finals officiated, including 2019.

== Match summary ==
Sunday, 6 October
7:40pm (AEDT)

Sydney Roosters	14 – 8	Canberra Raiders
Tries: Verrills (7') 1 Tedesco (73') 1 Goals: Mitchell 3/5 (8', 21' pen, 74'); Sin Bin: Cronk (50')	1st: 8 – 6; 2nd: 6 – 2	Tries: 1 (31') Wighton; Goals: 2/2 Croker (32', 50' pen)

ANZ Stadium
Attendance: 82,922
Clive Churchill Medal: Jack Wighton
Referee: Ben Cummins, Gerard Sutton

=== First half ===
Unfortunate circumstances robbed Canberra of an early scoring chance in the 3rd minute: Canberra prop Sia Soliola charged down Luke Keary's fifth tackle kick, but the ball bounced back off Roosters trainer Travis Touma, who was jogging around seven metres behind play. With no Roosters in the backfield and Raiders' second-rower Elliott Whitehead in best position to pursue the ball, Canberra would have been in a strong position to chase down an opening try; but, instead, the incident fell under the 'mutual interference' rule, resulting in a scrum feed to the Roosters, since the incident occurred in its defensive half. From the ensuing set of six, the Roosters earned a repeat set and attacked the Canberra line: Boyd Cordner crossed but was held up in the 5th minute, before Sam Verrills scored the first try of the game in the 7th minute, grounding the ball next to the posts with a 10m run from dummy-half. Latrell Mitchell converted, and the Roosters led 6–0.

Following the opening try, Canberra gained the territory advantage and made several attacking raids, including a bargeover attempt by Whitehead in the 11th minute which was held up, and several attacking bomb kicks; however, Canberra was unable to find the tryline. During this period, Roosters forward Mitchell Aubusson left the field with a match-ending knee injury. In the 19th minute, as Sydney advanced, Canberra's Joseph Tapine tackled Sydney's Victor Radley high, and Mitchell converted a 35-metre penalty to extend the lead to 8–0.

In the 30th minute, Canberra earned a repeat set after Sydney Roosters full-back James Tedesco fumbled an aerial contest for a bomb kick 10m from his defensive try line. On the next tackle, Jack Wighton broke the line between Sydney Roosters defenders Boyd Cordner and Angus Crichton to score Canberra's first try. Jarrod Croker converted to reduce the margin to 8–6.

The Canberra side fumbled the first play-the-ball after the restart, giving the Sydney Roosters the territory advantage, but several attacking raids came up short. In the last seconds before half-time before half time, Croker was penalised for interfering with Brett Morris in the chase for an attacking bomb; Mitchell's kick from near the sideline missed, and the half-time margin was 8–6.

=== Second half ===
Canberra dominated the game for the early part of the second half, with several near scoring chances in the first ten minutes. In the 50th minute, as John Bateman attempted a close-quarters pass near the posts to Josh Papalii, who was tackled by retiring Sydney half-back Cooper Cronk before the pass arrived; the referee sent Cronk to the sin bin for ten minutes for a professional foul, and asked the bunker to review for a possible penalty try, which it ruled against. Croker leveled the score at 8–8 from the penalty kick. During Cronk's ten minutes off the field, Canberra continued to dominate possession, but were held out by the Roosters; their only close scoring chance came in the 60th minute, when a chain of fifth tackle passes to the right wing put Brett Morris over in the corner, but was called back when Joseph Leilua's final flick pass was forward.

In the 67th minute, a pass by Radley saw Sio Siua Taukeiaho break the line to swing territory in Sydney's favour; and soon after winning a repeat set from a bomb kick, the Roosters won a penalty for a high tackle against Canberra's Aidan Sezer on Luke Keary. Mitchell missed the wide angle kick, and the score remained 8–8.

The game's most controversial moment came in the 71st minute. A Canberra fifth tackle bomb kick was contested in the air 10m from the try line, and bounced backwards off the Canberra chaser's shoulder to Josh Hodgson. Controlling referee Ben Cummins, believing the ball had hit Sydney full-back James Tedesco, signalled and called 'six again'; seconds later, on the advice of assistant referee Gerard Sutton and touch judge Chris Butler, he changed the signal and call to fifth tackle. The play ended with Jack Wighton, who did not hear or see the changed call, and he took a safe tackle rather than launch another fifth-tackle attacking option, resulting in a changeover.

From the ensuing set, on fourth tackle, Latrell Mitchell broke the line down the left wing at midfield with a flick pass to Daniel Tupou which ended with a try to James Tedesco. Mitchell converted, and the Roosters took a 14–8 lead. An even contest ensued over the last six minutes, the Sydney Roosters able to defend its lead and win the game, 14–8.

=== Overall ===
Canberra was considered to have played better overall, with more scoring opportunities and territory, but was unable to convert this into a winning score. Overall, the Raiders held 54% of possession. They played with much greater variation in attack, throwing 19 offloads to Sydney's 1, and launching 15 bomb and grubber kicks to Sydney's 9. The Clive Churchill Medal for man of the match was awarded to Canberra five-eighth Jack Wighton, who scored one try and led the Raiders' kicking game.

The win made the Sydney Roosters the first club since the Brisbane Broncos in 1992 and 1993 NSWRL seasons to win back-to-back premierships in a unified competition, and the first ever in the post-schism NRL competition. It was the first time the Roosters had won consecutive titles since 1974 and 1975.

The game is widely remembered for Cummins erroneous 'six again' call and the impact it had leading up to the winning try. Following the game, the NRL acknowledged the error and regretted the confusion it caused, while also confirming that the eventual call of fifth tackle was correct and endorsing Cummins' right to change his call on the advice of his assistant referees. Nevertheless, the call drew condemnation from Raiders' and neutral observers. Many analysts also disputed the league's endorsement of Cummins' right to change the call, citing NRL Law 16.9 which allows a judgement call to be changed on another referee's advice only in the event of foul play.

The game's other controversial decisions – the 'mutual interference' with the Roosters' trainer, and the sin binning of Cooper Cronk – were both also endorsed by the league's review. However, the 'mutual interference' rule was acknowledged to be an outdated rule, remnant from an era when territory was more valuable than possession.

== Curtain-raisers ==
Two opening matches were played on the ground prior to the grand final: the NRL State Championship – in which the Newtown Jets scored a try as time expired to snatch victory from the Burleigh Bears – and the NRL Women's Grand Final, won comfortably by the Brisbane Broncos Women's. Pre-match entertainment was headlined by American pop rock band OneRepublic. Natalie Bassingthwaighte performed the Advance Australia Fair. The match was broadcast live throughout Australia by the Nine Network.

=== NRL State Championship ===
2019 NRL State Championship

Sunday, 6 October
13:35 AEDT (UTC+11)

Newtown Jets	20 – 16	Burleigh Bears
Tries: 4 Katoa 54', 76'; Ferris 63', 80'; Goals: 2 Trindall pen 19' (1/4); Eastwood 80' (1/1); Sin bin: 1 Mulitalo (yellow card) 38' to 48'	1st: 2–10; 2nd: 18–6; Report	Tries: 3 Don 22', 30'; Fogarty 47'; Goals: 2 Fogarty 32', 48' (2/3)

ANZ Stadium, Sydney
Referees: Todd Smith, Tyson Brough
Player of the Match: Toby Rudolf (Newtown)

=== NRL Women's Premiership Grand Final ===
Sunday, 6 October
4:05pm (AEDT)

Brisbane Broncos Women's	30 – 6	St George Illawarra Dragons Women's
Tries: Lavinia Gould (4') 1 Raecene McGregor (16') 1 Julia Robinson (39') 1 Chelsea Lenarduzzi (42') 1 Amber Pilley (49') 1 Goals: Meg Ward 5/6 (18', 33' pen, 41', 43', 50')	1st: 10 – 0; 2nd: 20 – 6	Tries: 1 (51') Kezie Apps; Goals: 1/1 Maddie Studdon (52')

ANZ Stadium, Sydney
Referee: Kasey Badger, Daniel Schwass
