= Sam Verrills =

Australian rugby league footballer (born 1999)

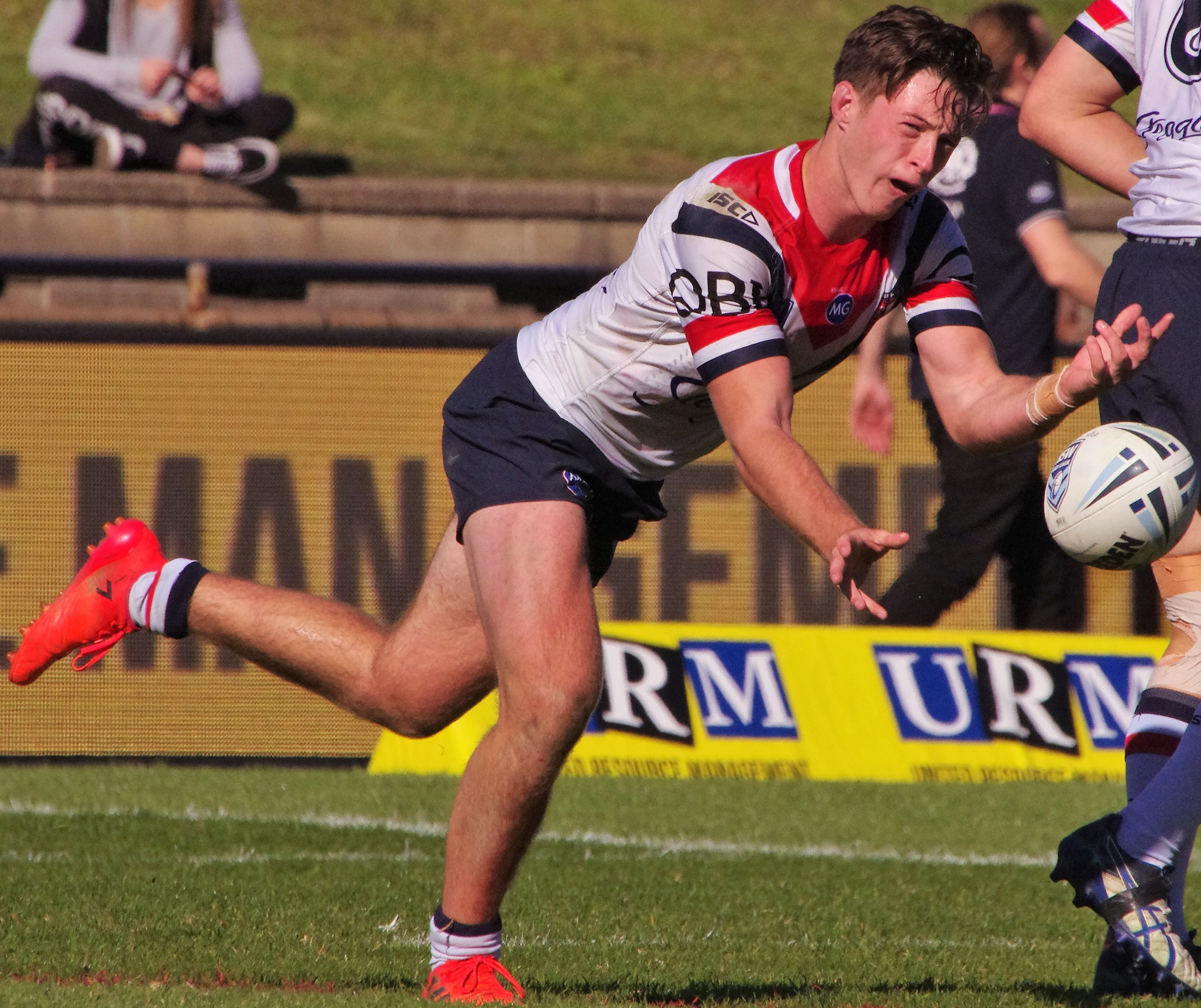

Personal information
- Full name: Samuel Verrills
- Born: 13 January 1999 (age 27) Avalon Beach, New South Wales, Australia
- Height: 183 cm (6 ft 0 in)
- Weight: 86 kg (13 st 8 lb)

Playing information
- Position: Hooker
Club
Years	Team	Pld	T	G	FG	P
2019–22	Sydney Roosters	48	7	0	0	28
2023–26	Gold Coast Titans	69	5	0	0	20
	Total	117	12	0	0	48
- Source: As of 4 September 2026

Samuel Verrills (born 13 January 1999) is an Australian professional rugby league footballer who last played as a hooker for the Gold Coast Titans in the National Rugby League (NRL).

Verrills previously played for the Sydney Roosters with whom he won the 2019 NRL Grand Final, scoring the opening try of the match.

== Early life ==
Verrills was born in Sydney, New South Wales and was educated at Barrenjoey High School, Avalon.

Verrills played his junior rugby league for Avalon Bulldogs.

== Career ==
Verrills made his NRL debut in round 6 of the 2019 NRL season for the Sydney Roosters against the Melbourne Storm at AAMI Park. In Round 20 against the Gold Coast, Verrills scored his first try in the top grade as the Roosters won the match 58–6 at the Sydney Cricket Ground.

In his debut year Verrills won his first premiership with the Roosters against the Canberra Raiders. Verrills scored the opening try after 6 minutes and the match was eventually won by Sydney, 14–8, making them the first club in 26 years to have won consecutive premierships in a unified competition, and the first time the club has won consecutive titles since 1974 and 1975.

In round 7 of the 2020 NRL season, Verrills was taken from the field with an ACL injury. In December, Verrills signed a contract extension keeping him at the Sydney Roosters until the end of 2024.

In the 2021 NRL season, after coming back from the injury, he then suffered a detached retina keeping him on the sidelines for multiple weeks. Verrills played a total of 14 games for the Roosters in the 2021 including the club's opening finals game against the Gold Coast. The Sydney would be eliminated from the second week of the finals losing to Manly 42–6.

On 10 August 2022, Verrills signed a two-year deal to join the Gold Coast. In round 22 of the 2022 NRL season, Verrills scored two tries for the Sydney Roosters in a 32–18 victory over North Queensland.

In round 1 of the 2023 NRL season, Verrills made his club debut for the Gold Coast in their victory over the Wests Tigers at Leichhardt Oval. The following week, Verrills fractured his collar bone in the clubs loss against St. George Illawarra. Verrills was later ruled out for an indefinite period. On 8 August 2023, it was announced that Verrills would miss the rest of the 2023 NRL season due to a shoulder injury. Verrills played 24 games for the Gold Coast in the 2024 NRL season as the club finished 14th on the table. Verrills played 21 matches for the Gold Coast in the 2025 NRL season as the club narrowly avoided the wooden spoon finishing 16th on the table. Verrills played 12 games for the Gold Coast in the 2026 NRL season as the club finished 16th on the table. Verrills was one of five players released by the club. On 6 September 2026, Verrills' partner posted on social media "Thank god that’s over x, no more Titans hallelujah". On 18 November 2026, the Roosters confirmed that Verrills would return to the club on a one year deal.

== Statistics ==
Year	Team	Games	Tries	Pts
2019	Sydney Roosters	14	3	12
2020	Sydney Roosters	5		
2021	Sydney Roosters	14	1	4
2022	Sydney Roosters	15	3	12
2023	Gold Coast Titans	11	1	4
2024	Gold Coast Titans	24	1	4
2025	Gold Coast Titans	21	2	8
2026	Gold Coast Titans	12	1	4
2027	Sydney Roosters			
	Totals	116	12	48
