= Sio Siua Taukeiaho =

NZ & Tonga international rugby league footballer

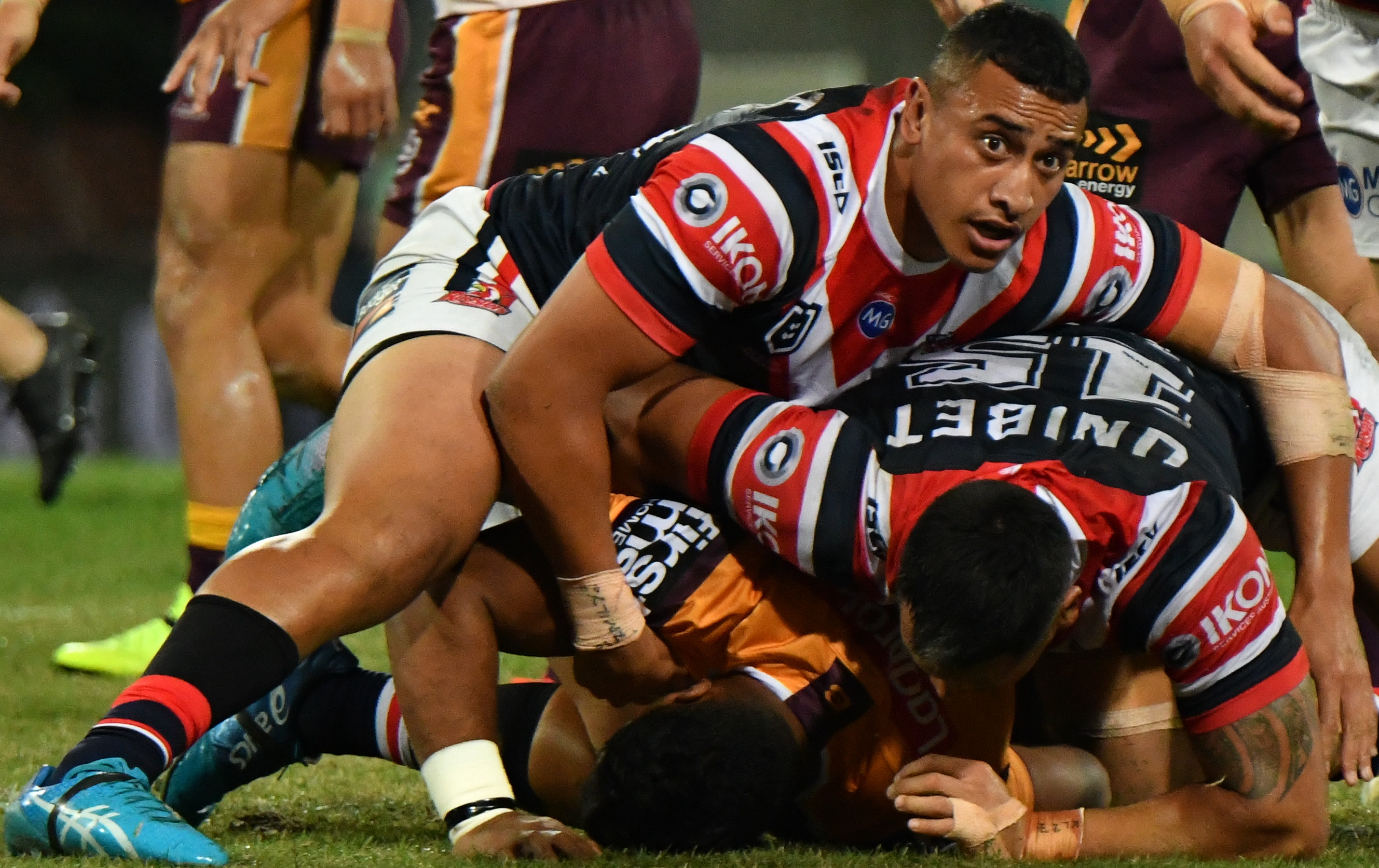

Personal information
- Full name: Sio Siua Taukei'aho
- Born: 3 January 1992 (age 34) Auckland, New Zealand
- Height: 186 cm (6 ft 1 in)
- Weight: 108 kg (17 st 0 lb)

Playing information
- Position: Prop, Lock, Second-row
Club
Years	Team	Pld	T	G	FG	P
2013	New Zealand Warriors	1	0	0	0	0
2014–22	Sydney Roosters	168	13	63	0	178
2023–24	Catalans Dragons	10	1	0	0	4
2025–26	Manly Sea Eagles	26	1	0	0	4
	Total	205	15	63	0	186
Representative
Years	Team	Pld	T	G	FG	P
2015–22	Tonga	15	2	26	0	60
2015	New Zealand	1	0	0	0	0
- Source: As of 9 May 2026

Sio Siua Taukeiaho (born 3 January 1992) is a professional rugby league footballer who last played as a prop or loose forward for the Manly Warringah Sea Eagles in the NRL. He plays for Tonga and played for New Zealand at international level.

He previously played for the Sydney Roosters and New Zealand Warriors in the National Rugby League (NRL). He won back-to-back NRL premierships with the Roosters in 2018 and 2019.

== Background ==
Taukeiaho was born and raised in Ōtara, South Auckland, New Zealand.

== Playing career ==
=== New Zealand Warriors ===
Taukeiaho is of Tongan descent and played for the Otara Scorpions in 2010 before being signed by the New Zealand Warriors.

He played in the 2011 Toyota Cup winning Junior Warriors and was named in the Junior Kiwis that year.

He made his first grade debut in round 26 against the St. George Illawarra Dragons on 7 September 2013.

At the end of the 2013 season he requested, and was granted, his release from the Warriors. Taukeiaho would then tweet on 27 September 2013 that he signed with the Roosters for two years.

=== Sydney Roosters ===
Taukeiaho came into the 2015 NRL season as the Roosters' replacement for the departed Sonny Bill Williams. Taukeiaho was a surprise inclusion on the interchange to start the 2015 season, his great early form cemented his spot as he went on to play every game of the season, scoring 2 tries.

On 30 September 2018, Taukeiaho played in Eastern Suburbs 21–6 victory over Melbourne in the 2018 NRL grand final.

Taukeiaho made a total of 20 appearances for the Sydney Roosters in the 2019 NRL season as the club finished second on the table and qualified for the finals. Taukeiaho played from the bench in the 2019 NRL Grand Final as the Sydney Roosters won their second consecutive premiership defeating Canberra 14–8 at ANZ Stadium.

He played a total of 21 games for the Sydney Roosters in the 2021 NRL season including the club's two finals matches. The Sydney Roosters would be eliminated from the second week of the finals losing to Manly 42-6.

=== Catalans Dragons ===
On 14 October 2023, Taukeiaho played in Catalans 2023 Super League Grand Final loss against Wigan.

On 12 July 2024, it was announced that Catalans Dragons had terminated his contract, along with two other players namely Jayden Nikorima and Damel Diakhate, for being "...involved in an incident deemed to be ‘highly unacceptable’ by the French club and contrary to their values..." After his release from Catalans, Taukeiaho attempted to sign with the Canterbury-Bankstown Bulldogs but the request was blocked by the NRL for the rest of the season.

=== Manly Warringah Sea Eagles ===
On 8 November 2024, Taukeiaho signed a one year deal with Manly for the 2025 NRL season. He played 21 games for Manly in the 2025 NRL season as the club finished 10th on the table. On 14 November 2025, it was announced that Taukeiaho re-signed for a further year with Manly.

In May 2026, Taukeiaho broke both bones in his leg while scoring a try in Manly's win against the Broncos in round 10.

In September, Taukeiaho was one of twelve players farewelled by the club at the end of their season.

=== International ===
Taukeiaho played for Tonga against Papua New Guinea in an end of year test match in the PNG while on 2 May 2015 in the Gold Coast, he played for Tonga in their Polynesian Cup clash with Pacific rivals Samoa.

On 2 November 2019, Taukeiaho captained Tonga against Australia as they went on to win 16–12, causing one of the biggest upsets in international rugby league history.

== Statistics ==
Year	Team	Games	Tries	Goals	Pts
2013	New Zealand Warriors	1			
2015	Sydney Roosters	27	2		8
2016	Sydney Roosters	20	1	27	58
2017	Sydney Roosters	17	1	3	10
2018	Sydney Roosters	24	1	5	14
2019	Sydney Roosters	21	5	3	26
2020	Sydney Roosters	20	1	3	10
2021	Sydney Roosters	21		22	44
2022	Sydney Roosters	18	2		8
2023	Catalans Dragons	10	1		4
2025	Manly Warringah Sea Eagles	21			
2026	Manly Warringah Sea Eagles	5	1		4
	Totals	205	15	63	186
