= Isaac Liu =

New Zealand & Samoa international rugby league footballer

Isaac "Iceman" Liu
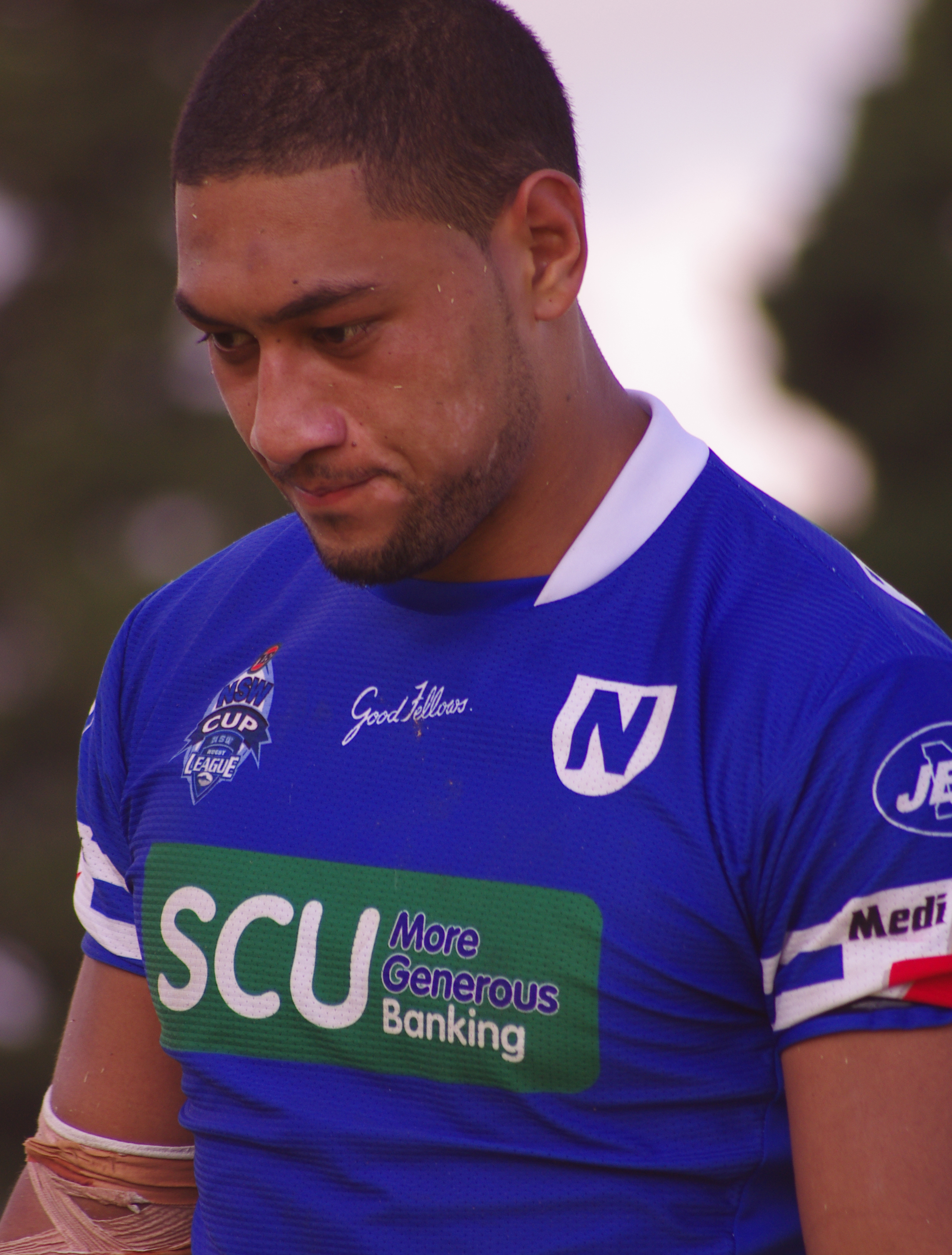

Personal information
- Full name: Isaac Liu
- Born: 26 April 1991 (age 35) Auckland, New Zealand
- Height: 6 ft 2 in (1.87 m)
- Weight: 17 st 0 lb (108 kg)

Playing information
- Position: Loose forward, Prop
Club
Years	Team	Pld	T	G	FG	P
2013–21	Sydney Roosters	203	15	0	0	60
2022–24	Gold Coast Titans	69	1	0	0	4
2025–26	Leigh Leopards	61	3	0	0	12
2027–	Hull FC	0	0	0	0	0
	Total	333	19	0	0	76
Representative
Years	Team	Pld	T	G	FG	P
2014–15	Samoa	5	1	0	0	4
2017–	New Zealand	12	2	0	0	8
- Source: As of 19 September 2026

Isaac Liu (born 26 April 1991) is a professional rugby league footballer who plays as a loose forward and prop forward for the Hull FC in the Super league and New Zealand at international level.

He has previously played for the Sydney Roosters in the NRL and won back-to-back NRL premierships with that club in 2018 and 2019. He represented Samoa earlier in his career at international level.

== Background ==
Liu was born in Auckland, New Zealand, and is of Samoan and Niuean heritage.

He played his junior football for the Otahuhu Leopards before moving to Australia as a teen and attending Keebra Park State High School on the Gold Coast, Queensland. He is of Samoan and Niuean descent.

In 2011, Liu signed with the Sydney Roosters. He played for the Roosters' NYC team in 2011, scoring 2 tries in 19 games.

== Playing career ==
In round 4 of the 2013 NRL season Liu made his NRL debut for the Roosters against the Parramatta Eels in a 50-0 victory at the Sydney Football Stadium. Liu made 15 appearances for the club in his debut season including the 40-14 preliminary final victory over Newcastle but he missed out on selection in the 2013 NRL Grand Final side which defeated Manly-Warringah. In May 2014, Liu played for Samoa in the 2014 Pacific Rugby League International. He made headlines in the match after taking a massive shot by Fijian player Korbin Sims. Liu made 23 appearances for Easts in the 2014 NRL season as the club won the minor premiership. Liu played in the club's preliminary final defeat by South Sydney which ended their premiership defence. On 7 October 2014, Liu was selected in the Samoan 24 man squad for the 2014 Four Nations series. On 2 May 2015, Liu played for Samoa in the Polynesian Cup against Tonga. In the 2015 NRL season, Liu made 26 appearances as the Sydney Roosters won their third consecutive minor premiership. Liu played in the club's preliminary final loss against Brisbane at Suncorp Stadium.

On 21 July 2017, Liu played his 100th First grade game against Newcastle, in this game he scored a try as the Roosters won the match 28-4 at the Sydney Football Stadium. Liu made a total of 22 appearances for Easts in the 2017 NRL season as the club finished 2nd on the table and reached the preliminary final before suffering a shock defeat by North Queensland. On 5 October 2017, Liu was named in New Zealand Rugby League world cup squad. Liu made 26 appearances for Easts in the 2018 NRL season as they won the minor premiership and reached the 2018 NRL Grand Final against Melbourne. Liu played from the bench as Easts defeated Melbourne 21-6 claiming their 14th premiership. Liu made 24 appearances for the Sydney Roosters in the 2019 NRL season as the club reached the 2019 NRL Grand Final against Canberra. The club would go on to win 14-8 with Liu starting at prop. It was the club's second consecutive premiership victory and Liu's second as a player.

Liu played 19 games for the Sydney Roosters in the 2020 NRL season. The club reached the finals but were eliminated by Canberra at the Sydney Cricket Ground. On 7 July 2021, Liu signed a contract to join the Gold Coast for the start of the 2022 season. Liu played 26 games for the Sydney Roosters in the 2021 NRL season as the club reached the finals but were eliminated in the second week by Manly.

=== 2022 ===
Liu played a total of 23 games for the Gold Coast in the 2022 NRL season as the club finished 13th on the table.

=== 2023 ===
Liu played a total of 21 matches for the Gold Coast in the 2023 NRL season as the club finished 14th on the table.

=== 2024 ===
Liu played a total of 23 matches for the Gold Coast in the 2024 season as the club again finished 14th on the table. On 9 September 2024, it was announced that Liu had been released by the club on compassionate grounds.

On 9 October 2024 it was announced that Liu had signed for Leigh in the Super League on a two-year deal.

=== 2025 ===
Liu made his club debut for Leigh in round 1 of the 2025 Super League season against rivals Wigan. Leigh would win the match 1-0 in extra-time after the game finished 0-0 at the conclusion of 80 minutes. Liu played 29 games for Leigh in the 2025 Super League season including their semi-final loss against Wigan.

=== 2026 ===
On 18 August 2026 it was reported that he had signed for Hull FC in the Super League on a 1-year deal.

== Statistics ==
Year	Team	Games	Tries	Pts
2013	Sydney Roosters	15		
2014	Sydney Roosters	23	2	8
2015	Sydney Roosters	26	1	4
2016	Sydney Roosters	22	1	4
2017	Sydney Roosters	22	2	8
2018	Sydney Roosters	26	5	20
2019	Sydney Roosters	24	2	8
2020	Sydney Roosters	19	1	4
2021	Sydney Roosters	26	1	4
2022	Gold Coast Titans	23		
2023	Gold Coast Titans	23	1	4
2024	Gold Coast Titans	23		
2025	Leigh Leopards	33	3	12
2026	Leigh Leopards	27		
2027	Hull FC			
	Totals	322	19	76
