= Joseph Manu =

New Zealand and Maori international rugby league footballer

Joey Manu
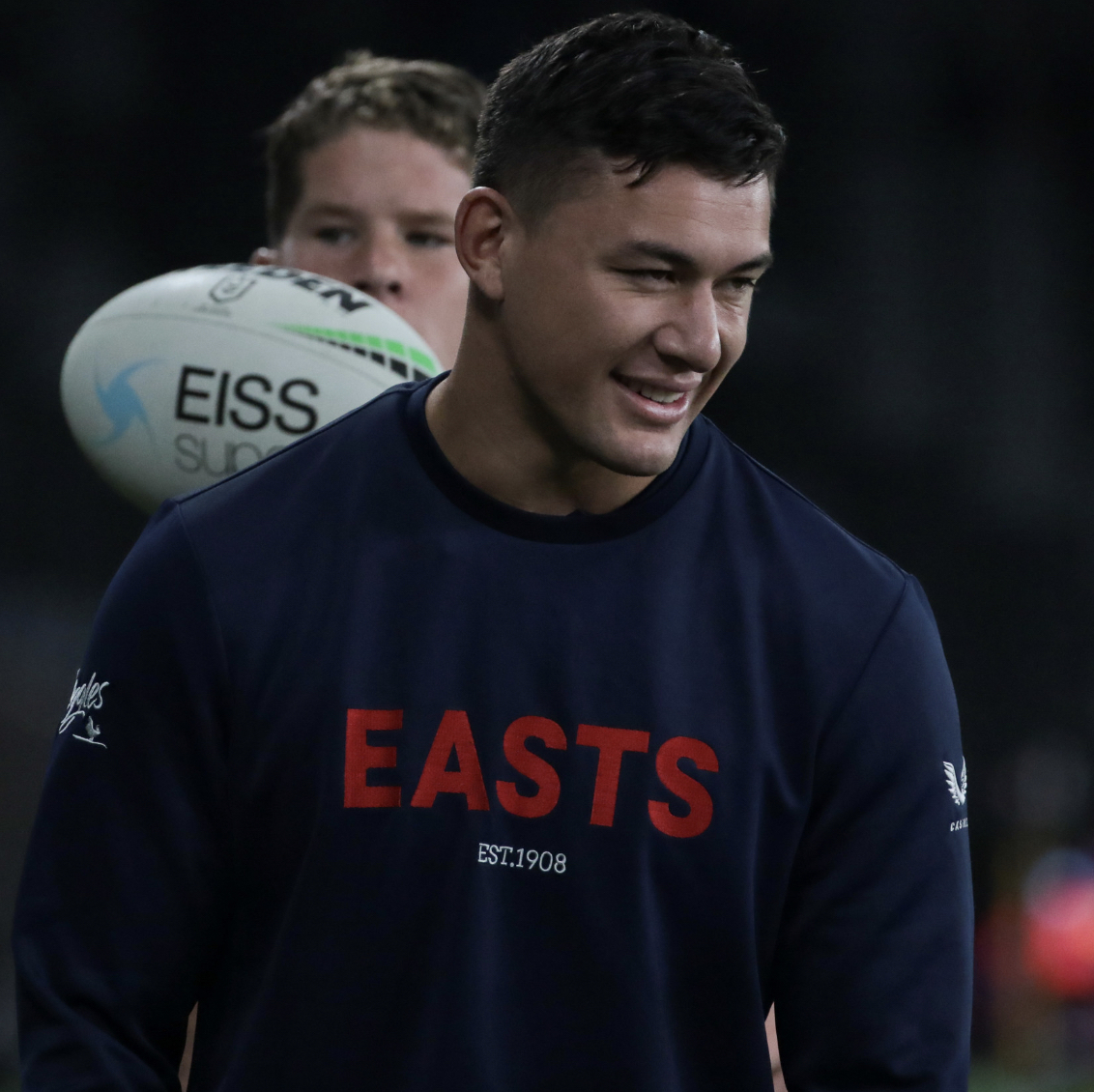

Personal information
- Full name: Joseph Manu
- Born: 29 June 1996 (age 30) Hamilton, New Zealand
- Height: 192 cm (6 ft 4 in)
- Weight: 102 kg (16 st 1 lb)

Playing information

Rugby league
- Position: Centre, Fullback, Wing, Five-eighth
Club
Years	Team	Pld	T	G	FG	P
2016–24	Sydney Roosters	181	69	0	0	276
Representative
Years	Team	Pld	T	G	FG	P
2018–23	New Zealand	17	6	0	0	24
2021	Māori All Stars	1	0	0	0	0

Rugby union
- Position: Centre, Wing, Fullback
Club
Years	Team	Pld	T	G	FG	P
2024–25	Toyota Verblitz	18	11	0	0	55
2025–	Racing 92	22	1	0	0	5
	Total	40	12	0	0	60
- Source: As of 21 June 2026
Medals
Men's rugby league nines
Representing Australia
Commonwealth Games
Bronze medal – third place	2014 Glasgow	Exhibition

Joseph Manu (born 29 June 1996) is a New Zealand professional rugby footballer who plays for Racing 92 in the Top 14. He previously played as a centre for the Sydney Roosters in the National Rugby League (NRL), with whom he won premierships in 2018 and 2019, and represented New Zealand and the New Zealand Māori at international level. He was widely regarded as one of the greatest centres in the game.

== Background ==
Manu was born in Hamilton, New Zealand, and is of Māori and Cook Island descent. He was raised in Tokoroa.

Manu played his junior rugby league for Tokoroa High School before being signed by the Sydney Roosters.

== Playing career ==
=== Early career ===
Having won the S. G. Ball Cup with the Roosters in 2014, Manu travelled to Glasgow to represent Australia in an under-19s rugby league nines tournament at the 2014 Commonwealth Games, where Australia finished in second place. Manu moved into the Roosters' NYC team by the end of the year, where he played until 2016, scoring 34 tries in 48 games. On 2 May 2015, Manu played for the Junior Kiwis against the Junior Kangaroos, playing on the wing and scoring a try in the 22-20 loss at Robina Stadium. On 16 June 2015, Manu re-signed with the Roosters on a 2-year contract. On 14 September 2015, Manu was named on the wing in the 2015 NYC team of the year as he scored 22 tries in 24 matches for the year.

=== 2016 ===
In February 2016, Manu was selected in the Roosters 2016 NRL Auckland Nines squad.

In Round 15 of the 2016 NRL season, Manu made his NRL debut for the Sydney Roosters against the New Zealand Warriors, playing on the wing in the 12-10 loss at Mt Smart Stadium. On 5 September 2016, Manu was named on the wing in the 2016 NYC Team of the Year. On 2 October 2016, Manu played on the wing in the Roosters 2016 Holden Cup Grand Final against the Penrith Panthers, scoring 2 tries in the comeback 30-28 victory after being down 28-6 at halftime. On 11 October 2016, Manu extended his contract with the Roosters to the end of the 2018 season. Manu finished his debut season in the NRL playing in 3 matches for the Roosters in the 2016 NRL season.

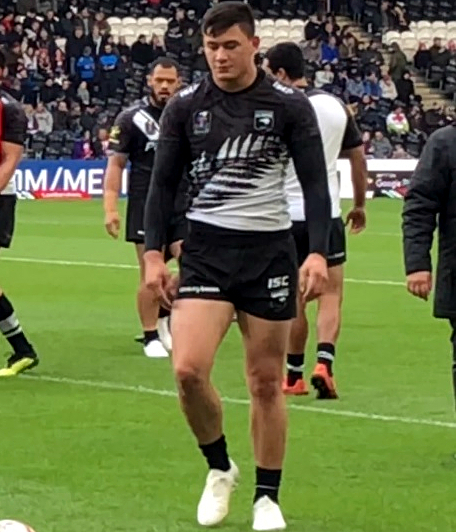
Manu warming up for the Kiwis in 2018

=== 2017 ===
In February 2017, Manu was selected in the Roosters 2017 NRL Auckland Nines winning squad.

In Round 7 against the Newcastle Knights, Manu scored his first NRL career try in the Roosters 24-6 win at Hunter Stadium. Manu finished the 2017 NRL season with playing in 16 matches and scoring 5 tries. Manu was overlooked for the Roosters finals series and played for the Wyong Roos in which they made the 2017 NSW Cup against the Penrith Panthers but lost 20-12 at Leichhardt Oval.

=== 2018 ===
On 20 March 2018, Manu extended his contract with the Roosters to the end of the 2020 season. On 30 September 2018, Manu played in the 2018 NRL Grand Final against the Melbourne Storm, playing at centre and scoring a try in the 21-6 win. In the final minutes of the match, Manu was on the receiving end of a kick to the head while he was on the ground by Melbourne five-eighth Cameron Munster in which Munster sin binned for the second time in the match. Manu had an enjoyable 2018 NRL season, playing in 26 matches and scoring 8 tries. The day after the Grand Final win, Manu was selected in the New Zealand national rugby league team 23-man squad for their one-off test against Australia and their tour of England.

On 13 October 2018, Manu made his international debut for New Zealand against Australia, playing at centre and scoring a try in a sensational debut as the Kiwis pulled off a 26-24 win at Mt Smart Stadium.

=== 2019 ===
Manu made 25 appearances for the Sydney Roosters in the 2019 NRL season as the club finished second on the table and qualified for the finals.

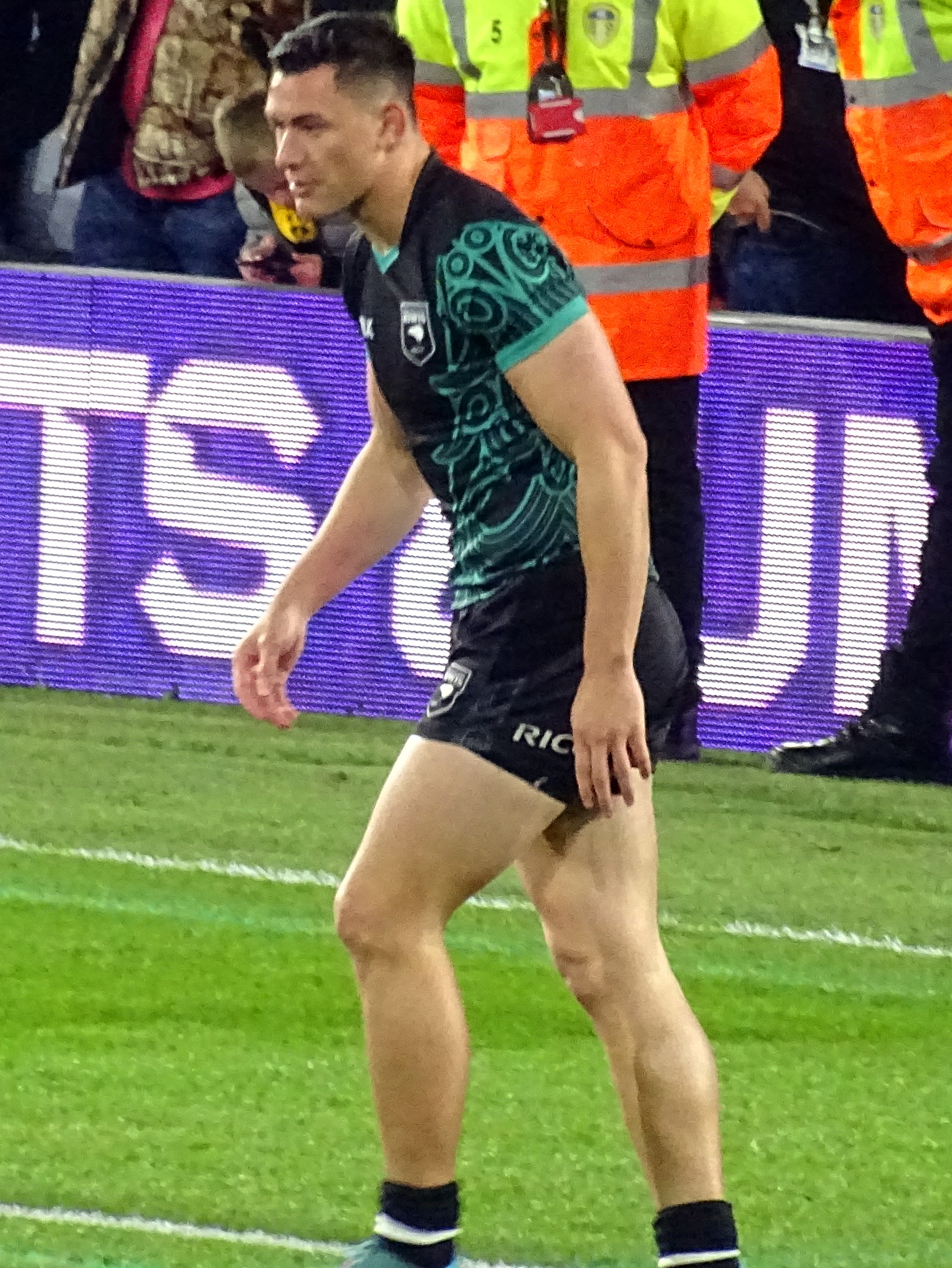
Manu warming up for the Kiwis in 2022

Manu played at centre in the club's 2019 NRL Grand Final victory over the Canberra Raiders at ANZ Stadium.

=== 2020 ===
On 22 February, Manu played for the Sydney Roosters in their 2020 World Club Challenge victory defeating St Helens 20-12.

Manu played 21 games for the Sydney Roosters in the 2020 NRL season. The club finished fourth on the table and qualified for the finals but lost both games to be eliminated in straight sets ending their quest for a third straight premiership.

=== 2021 ===
In round 12 of the 2021 NRL season, he scored two tries in a 44-16 victory over Canberra.

In the round 24 match against arch-rivals South Sydney, former teammate Latrell Mitchell hit Manu with a high and late shot to the head, resulting in a season-ending depressed cheekbone fracture. The Sydney Roosters would go on to lose the match 54-12. On 29 November 2021 after a speculated move to the New Zealand Warriors, Manu extended his contract to start with the Sydney Roosters until the end of 2024.

=== 2022 ===
In round 4 of the 2022 NRL season, he scored two tries for the Sydney Roosters in a 28-4 victory over North Queensland. The following week, he scored a further two tries in a 24-20 victory over Brisbane. In round 18, Manu scored two tries in a 54-26 victory over St. George Illawarra.

In October he was named in the New Zealand squad for the 2021 Rugby League World Cup.

In November he was named in the 2021 RLWC Team of the Tournament and was named the winner of the Golden Boot, for the best international player of the year. Manu also became the first Sydney Roosters player since Anthony Minichiello (in 2005) to claim the award while also becoming the next New Zealander after Roger Tuivasa-Sheck (in 2019) to win it despite the award wasn't given to anyone in 2020-2021 due to covid.

=== 2023 ===
In round 3 of the 2023 NRL season, Manu was sent to the sin bin during the Sydney Roosters 20-18 victory over arch-rivals South Sydney. Manu played 21 matches for the Sydney Roosters in the 2023 NRL season as the club finished 7th on the table and qualified for the finals. Manu played in the clubs elimination finals victory over Cronulla but missed the following weeks match against Melbourne in which the Sydney Roosters lost 18-13.

=== 2024 ===
In round 3 of the 2024 NRL season, Manu scored two tries for the Sydney Roosters in their 48-6 victory over arch-rivals South Sydney. On 16 April, it was reported that Manu had signed a one-year deal to join Japanese Rugby Union side Toyota Verblitz starting in 2025. In round 8 of the 2024 NRL season, Manu scored two tries for the Sydney Roosters in their 60-18 victory over St. George Illawarra in the traditional ANZAC Day game. In round 12, Manu scored two tries for the Sydney Roosters in their 44-16 win over Canberra.

On 26 August 2026, the PNG Chiefs announced the signing of Manu from the 2028 season, he was their seventh major signing.

== Rugby Union ==
He made his debut for Toyota Verblitz on 22 December 2024 at centre against Kubota Spears scoring a try on debut. He played at centre and right wing whole season finishing with 11 tries in 18 matches for the season. He played in every game this season but his team did not progress to the knock out rounds. He signed for Top14 side Racing 92 for the 2025-26 Top14 season.

== Honours ==
Individual

- Dally M Centre of the Year: 2022
- IRL Golden Boot: 2022
- RLWC Team of the Tournament: 2021

Sydney Roosters

- NRL Premiership: 2018, 2019
- NRL Minor Premiership: 2018

New Zealand

- Pacific Championship: 2023
