= 2024 South Sydney Rabbitohs season =

NRL rugby league season

- NRL Rank: 16th
- Play-off result: DNQ
- 2024 record: Wins: 7; losses: 17
- Points scored: For: 494; against: 682

Team information
- CEO: Blake Solly
- Head Coach: Jason Demetriou; Ben Hornby (caretaker)
- Captain: Cameron Murray
- Stadium: Accor Stadium
← 2023	List of seasons	2025 →

The 2024 South Sydney Rabbitohs season is the 115th in the history of the club. Coached by Ben Hornby and captained by Cameron Murray, they compete in the National Rugby League's 2024 Telstra Premiership.

== Squad ==
South Sydney Rabbitohs 2024 squad
Top 30 squad - 2024 NRL season			Supplementary list	Coaching staff
Jai Arrow – SR, PR; Thomas Burgess – PR; Michael Chee Kam – SR, CE; Damien Cook – HK; Tallis Duncan – LK; Campbell Graham – CE; Jye Gray – FB; Siliva Havili – LK, HK; Dean Hawkins – HB, FE; Jacob Host – SR	Lachlan Ilias – HB; Alex Johnston – WG; Richard Kennar – CE; Sean Keppie – PR; Keaon Koloamatangi – SR, LK, PR; Ben Lovett – SR; Peter Mamouzelos – HK; Taane Milne – WG, CE; Latrell Mitchell – FB; Shaquai Mitchell – SR, PR	Davvy Moale – PR; Tyrone Munro – WG; Cameron Murray (c) – LK, SR; Isaiah Tass – CE, WG; Tevita Tatola – PR; Leon Te Hau – WG; Izaac Tui'itupou Thompson – WG, CE; Cody Walker (vc) – FE, HB; Jack Wighton – CE, FE	Thomas Fletcher – SR; Jacob Gagai – WG, CE, FB; Liam Le Blanc – PR; Haizyn Mellars – CE; Fletcher Myers – CE, WG; Dion Teaupa – HB, FE; Extended squad: Bayleigh Bentley-Hape – FB, FE, CE; Chase Chapman – SR, LK; Adam Christensen – SR, CE; Matthew French – LK, PR; Gehamat Shibasaki – WG, CE; Leonard Skelton – CE, WG	Head coach: Ben Hornby (caretaker); Assistant coaches: David Furner; Joe O'Callaghan (NRL Assistant Coach/NSW Cup Coach); John Sutton (Development Coach); Andrew Croll (Head of Performance); Legend: (c) Captain(s); (vc) Vice-captain(s); Updated: 6 September 2024; Source(s): Rabbitohs squad

== Transfers ==
=== Transfers in ===
Nat	Pos	Player	From	Ref
(Australia)	CE	Jack Wighton	Canberra Raiders	
(Australia)	PR	Sean Keppie	Manly Warringah Sea Eagles	

=== Transfers out ===
Nat	Pos	Player	To	Ref
(Australia)	SR	Jed Cartwright	Newcastle Knights	
(Australia)	PR	Hame Sele	St. George Illawarra Dragons	
(Australia)	PR	Daniel Suluka-Fifita	Canterbury-Bankstown Bulldogs	
(Australia)	PR	Blake Taaffe	Canterbury-Bankstown Bulldogs	

== Fixtures ==
=== Pre-season ===
Round 1: 17 February 2024	St. George Illawarra Dragons	6–28	South Sydney Rabbitohs	Sydney
20:05 AEDT	Tries: Ravalawa 38'; Goals: Lomax 1/1 40'	[Report Report]	Tries: Host 36'; Burns 48', 71'; Moale 62'; Kennar 80'; Goals: Hawkins 3/4 37', 50', 63'; Milne 1/1 80'	Stadium: Netstrata Jubilee Stadium; Attendance: 8,827; Referee: Belinda Sharpe

Round 2: 23 February 2024	South Sydney Rabbitohs	10–46	Sydney Roosters	Sydney
18:00 AEDT	Tries: French 11'; Te Hau 65'; Goals: Bentley-Hape 1/2 13'	[Report Report]	Tries: Nasau 3'; Williams 16'; Ross 27'; Foketi 36'; Fekitoa 47'; Gromek 59', 61'; Coleman 72'; Jolliffee 74'; Goals: Taipari 5/9 28', 38', 49', 60', 73'	Stadium: Belmore Sports Ground; Attendance: 6,091; Referee: Ashley Klein

=== Regular season ===
==== League table ====
Pos	Team	Pld	W	D	L	B	PF	PA	PD	Pts	Qualification
1	Melbourne Storm	24	19	0	5	3	692	449	+243	44	Advance to finals series
2	Penrith Panthers (P)	24	17	0	7	3	580	394	+186	40	Advance to finals series
3	Sydney Roosters	24	16	0	8	3	738	463	+275	38	Advance to finals series
4	Cronulla-Sutherland Sharks	24	16	0	8	3	653	431	+222	38	Advance to finals series
5	North Queensland Cowboys	24	15	0	9	3	657	568	+89	36	Advance to finals series
6	Canterbury-Bankstown Bulldogs	24	14	0	10	3	529	433	+96	34	Advance to finals series
7	Manly Warringah Sea Eagles	24	13	1	10	3	634	521	+113	33	Advance to finals series
8	Newcastle Knights	24	12	0	12	3	470	510	−40	30	Advance to finals series
9	Canberra Raiders	24	12	0	12	3	474	601	−127	30	
10	Dolphins	24	11	0	13	3	577	578	−1	28	
11	St. George Illawarra Dragons	24	11	0	13	3	508	634	−126	28	
12	Brisbane Broncos	24	10	0	14	3	537	607	−70	26	
13	New Zealand Warriors	24	9	1	14	3	512	574	−62	25	
14	Gold Coast Titans	24	8	0	16	3	488	656	−168	22	
15	Parramatta Eels	24	7	0	17	3	561	716	−155	20	
16	South Sydney Rabbitohs	24	7	0	17	3	494	682	−188	20	
17	Wests Tigers	24	6	0	18	3	463	750	−287	18	

Source: National Rugby League
(P) Premiers

==== Results by round ====
Round	1	2	3	4	5	6	7	8	9	10	11	12	13	14	15	16	17	18	19	20	21	22	23	24	25	26	27
Ground	A	A	A	H	H	H	–	A	H	A	N	H	–	A	H	H	–	A	A	H	A	A	H	A	H	A	H
Result	L	L	L	W	L	L	B	L	L	L	L	W	B	W	W	W	B	W	L	W	L	L	L	L	L	L	L
Position	13	16	17	16	17	17	16	17	17	17	17	17	17	16	14	14	14	13	15	12	15	15	15	15	15	15	16
Points	0	0	0	2	2	2	4	4	4	4	4	6	8	10	12	14	16	18	18	20	20	20	20	20	20	20	20

Source: National Rugby League
A = Away; H = Home; N = Neutral; B = Bye; W = Win; D = Draw; L = Loss

==== Matches ====
Round 1: 2 March 2024	Manly Warringah Sea Eagles	36–24	South Sydney Rabbitohs	Las Vegas, United States
18:30 PST	Tries: Olakau'atu 22'; Saab 37'; Croker 39'; B. Trbojevic 53'; Garrick 60'; Brooks 76'; Goals: Garrick 6/6 24', 38', 51', 55', 62', 78'	[Report Report]	Tries: Kennar 6', 78'; Gagai 30'; L. Mitchell 43'; Johnston 47'; Goals: L. Mitchell 2/5 7', 48'	Stadium: Allegiant Stadium; Attendance: 40,746; Referee: Ashley Klein

Round 2: 14 March 2024	Brisbane Broncos	28–18	South Sydney Rabbitohs	Brisbane
19:00 AEST	Tries: Mariner 17', 74'; Walsh 24', 62'; Arthars 51'; Goals: Reynolds 2/4 26', 30 pen' Walsh 2/2 64', 76'	[Report Report]	Tries: Havili 42'; Moale 45'; L. Mitchell 79'; Goals: L. Mitchell 3/3 43', 46', 49'; Sin bin: Cook (yellow card) 29' to 39'	Stadium: Suncorp Stadium; Attendance: 35,507; Referee: Gerard Sutton

Round 3: 22 March 2024	Sydney Roosters	48–6	South Sydney Rabbitohs	Moore Park
20:00 AEDT	Tries: Young 3'; Walker 14', 27'; Manu 41', 66'; Watson 61'; Tedesco 72', 77'; Goals: Walker 4/4 5', 16', 29', 43'; Sua'ali'i 4/4 62', 67', 74', 77'	[Report Report]	Tries: Host 50'; Goals: L. Mitchell 1/1 51'; Sin bin: L. Mitchell (yellow card) 65' to 75'	Stadium: Allianz Stadium; Attendance: 37,594; Referee: Ashley Klein

Round 4: 29 March 2024	South Sydney Rabbitohs	20–16	Canterbury-Bankstown Bulldogs	Sydney Olympic Park
16:05 AEDT	Tries: Burgess 9'; Wighton 13', 44'; Goals: L. Mitchell 4/5 10', 45', 52 pen', 75 pen'	[Report Report]	Tries: Burton 24'; Tracey 33', 79'; Goals: Burton 2/3 26', 35'; Sin bin: Morrin (yellow card) 50' to 60'	Stadium: Accor Stadium; Attendance: 35,275; Referee: Gerard Sutton

Round 5: 6 April 2024	South Sydney Rabbitohs	4–34	New Zealand Warriors	Sydney Olympic Park
15:00 AEDT	Tries: Thompson 5'; Goals: L. Mitchell 0/1	[Report Report]	Tries: Berry 8'; Ford 34'; Johnson 36', 47'; Tuivasa-Sheck 61'; Martin 70'; Goals: Johnson 5/6 10', 36', 38', 48', 71'	Stadium: Accor Stadium; Attendance: 13,184; Referee: Liam Kennedy

Round 6: 13 April 2024	South Sydney Rabbitohs	22–34	Cronulla-Sutherland Sharks	Sydney Olympic Park
19:35 AEST	Tries: Chee-Kam 16'; Milne 55'; Burgess 68'; Tass 74'; Goals: Hawkins 3/5 18', 56', 69'	[Report Report]	Tries: Mulitalo 12', 33'; Wilton 28', 65'; Katoa 48'; Brailey 78'; Goals: Hynes 5/6 30', 35', 50', 66', 78'	Stadium: Accor Stadium; Attendance: 12,207; Referee: Ashley Klein

Round 7 (Bye for South Sydney Rabbitohs)

Round 8: 25 April 2024	Melbourne Storm	54–20	South Sydney Rabbitohs	Melbourne
19:50 AEST	Tries: Papenhuyzen 6', 42'; Coates 9', 27', 32'; Warbrick 29'; Grant 36'; Munster 65'; Wishart 70'; Chan 76'; Goals: Meaney 7/10 7', 28', 31', 37', 66', 71', 76'	[Report Report]	Tries: Gagai 18', 50'; Milne 57'; Murray 59'; Goals: Hawkins 2/4 58', 60'; Sin bin: Milne (yellow card) 79' to 80'	Stadium: AAMI Park; Attendance: 25,149; Referee: Todd Smith

Round 9: 2 May 2024	South Sydney Rabbitohs	12–42	Penrith Panthers	Sydney Olympic Park
19:50 AEST	Tries: Thompson 6'; Hawkins 9'; Goals: Hawkins 2/2 7', 10'; Sin bin: Arrow (yellow card) 17' to 27'; Host (yellow card) 68' to 78'	[Report Report]	Tries: Turuva 17'; Schneider 21'; Garner 32', 69'; Smith 58'; May 62'; Tago 76'; Goals: Edwards 7/7 19', 22', 33', 60', 63', 70', 77'; Sin bin: Tago (yellow card) 5' to 15'	Stadium: Accor Stadium; Attendance: 8,155; Referee: Adam Gee

Round 10: 11 May 2024	St. George Illawarra Dragons	28–14	South Sydney Rabbitohs	Kogarah
17:30 AEST	Tries: Lomax 9'; Bird 26'; Su'a 58'; De Belin 72'; Goals: Lomax 5/6 11', 42 pen', 60', 64 pen', 74'; Field goals: Lomax 39 (2 pt)'	[Report Report]	Tries: L. Mitchell 22', 77'; Thompson 45'; Goals: L. Mitchell 1/3 23'	Stadium: Nestrata Jubilee Stadium; Attendance: 7,517; Referee: Belinda Sharpe

Round 11: 18 May 2024	South Sydney Rabbitohs	22–28	North Queensland Cowboys	Brisbane
19:45 AEST	Tries: L. Mitchell 21'; Johnston 31'; Walker 65'; Cook 75'; Goals: L. Mitchell 3/4 22', 32', 66'; Sin bin: Teaupa (yellow card) 71' to 80'	[Report Report]	Tries: Vailea 7'; Dearden 13', 70'; Burns 37', 43'; Goals: Holmes 3/5 15', 39', 44'; Sin bin: Dearden (yellow card) 79' to 80'	Stadium: Suncorp Stadium; Attendance: 50,708; Referee: Peter Gough

Round 12: 25 May 2024	South Sydney Rabbitohs	42–26	Parramatta Eels	Sydney Olympic Park
19:35 AEST	Tries: Arrow 8'; Koloamatangi 11', 76'; Teaupa 20'; Johnston 26'; Keppie 52'; Cook 71'; Goals: L. Mitchell 6/7 9', 12', 21', 53', 71', 77'; Teaupa 1/1 47 pen' Sin bin: L. Mitchell (yellow card) 38' to 48'	[Report Report]	Tries: Talagi 30'; Russell 32'; Harper 42'; Sivo 64', 78'; Goals: Asi 3/5 31', 34', 65'	Stadium: Accor Stadium; Attendance: 15,202; Referee: Chris Butler

Round 13 (Bye for South Sydney Rabbitohs)

Round 14: 8 June 2024	Gold Coast Titans	12–46	South Sydney Rabbitohs	Gold Coast
15:00 AEST	Tries: Khan-Pereira 19'; D. Fifita 69'; Goals: Campbell 2/2 21', 70'	[Report Report]	Tries: L. Mitchell 8'; Gagai 12'; Kennar 28'; Walker 34', 77'; Burgess 54'; Moale 64'; Wighton 74'; Goals: L. Mitchell 6/7 9', 29', 35', 55', 65', 78'; Arrow 1/1 76'	Stadium: Cbus Super Stadium; Attendance: 14,434; Referee: Chris Sutton

Round 15: 14 June 2024	South Sydney Rabbitohs	22–12	Brisbane Broncos	Sydney Olympic Park
20:00 AEST	Tries: Cook 12'; Koloamatangi 17'; L. Mitchell 20'; Johnston 49'; Goals: L. Mitchell 3/4 13', 18', 21'; Sin bin: Kennar (yellow card) 30' to 40'; L. Mitchell (yellow card) 55' to 65'	[Report Report]	Tries: Mariner 66', 77'; Goals: Staggs 2/2 68', 77'; Sin bin: Riki (yellow card) 55' to 65'	Stadium: Accor Stadium; Attendance: 12,207; Referee: Adam Gee

Round 16: 22 June 2024	South Sydney Rabbitohs	14–0	Manly Warringah Sea Eagles	Sydney Olympic Park
19:35 AEST	Tries: Kennar 9'; Gray 20'; Koloamatangi 78'; Goals: Walker 1/3 79'	[Report Report]		Stadium: Accor Stadium; Attendance: 10,076; Referee: Chris Butler

Round 17 (Bye for South Sydney Rabbitohs)

Round 18: 4 July 2024	Parramatta Eels	16–32	South Sydney Rabbitohs	Parramatta
19:50 AEST	Tries: Talagi 35'; Campbell-Gillard 50'; Cartwright 72'; Goals: Moses 2/3 51', 72'; Sin bin: Moses (yellow card) 75' to 80'	[Report Report]	Tries: Gagai 8', 68'; Wighton 32', 76'; Walker 39'; L. Mitchell 56'; Goals: L. Mitchell 4/6 33', 39', 70', 77'	Stadium: CommBank Stadium; Attendance: 13,941; Referee: Liam Kennedy

Round 19: 11 July 2024	Dolphins	36–28	South Sydney Rabbitohs	Redcliffe
19:50 AEST	Tries: Bostock 5'; Pangai Junior 19'; Farnworth 25'; Nikorima 48'; O'Sullivan 69'; Fuller 71'; Goals: Isaako 6/6 6', 21', 27', 49', 70', 72'	[Report Report]	Tries: Gray 10'; Gagai 22', 58', 79'; Johnston 64', 74'; Goals: Walker 1/3 11'; Milne 1/3 74'	Stadium: Kayo Stadium; Attendance: 10,023; Referee: Gerard Sutton

Round 20: 20 July 2024	South Sydney Rabbitohs	42–28	Wests Tigers	Gosford
15:00 AEST	Tries: Moale 6'; Walker 9', 59'; Johnston 26', 35'; Mamouzelos 63'; Gray 72'; Goals: Cook 7/8 11', 27', 36', 43 pen', 61', 65', 73'	[Report Report]	Tries: Galvin 15'; Da Silva 18'; Bula 40'; Staines 47'; Si. Fainu 54'; Goals: Sezer 4/5 16', 19', 40', 56'; Sin bin: Sezer (yellow card) 68' to 78'	Stadium: Industree Group Stadium; Attendance: 16,284; Referee: Wyatt Raymond

Round 21: 28 July 2024	Canberra Raiders	32–12	South Sydney Rabbitohs	Canberra
18:15 AEST	Tries: Rapana 4', 36'; Savage 9'; Kris 19'; Mariota 44'; Goals: Fogarty 6/6 6', 10', 21', 37', 45', 70 pen' Sin bin: Whitehead (yellow card) 79' to 80'	[Report Report]	Tries: Milne 30'; Walker 39'; Duncan 60'; Goals: Cook 0/3	Stadium: GIO Stadium; Attendance: 12,114; Referee: Wyatt Raymond

Round 22: 3 August 2024	Cronulla-Sutherland Sharks	20–6	South Sydney Rabbitohs	Cronulla
19:35 AEST	Tries: Katoa 13'; Stonestreet 47'; Trindall 58'; Iro 65'; Goals: Trindall 1/3 60'; Atkinson 1/1 66'	[Report Report]	Tries: Gray 6'; Goals: Myers 1/2 29 pen'	Stadium: PointsBet Stadium; Attendance: 12,763; Referee: Liam Kennedy

Round 23: 8 August 2024	South Sydney Rabbitohs	16–28	Melbourne Storm	Sydney Olympic Park
19:50 AEST	Tries: Myers 18', 54'; Murray 70'; Goals: Myers 2/3 55', 71'	[Report Report]	Tries: Warbrick 6', 29'; Asofa-Solomona 23'; Papenhuyzen 34'; Anderson 41'; Goals: Meaney 4/6 7', 25', 35', 79 pen'	Stadium: Accor Stadium; Attendance: 8,973; Referee: Todd Smith

Round 24: 17 August 2024	Wests Tigers	18–16	South Sydney Rabbitohs	Campbelltown
19:35 AEST	Tries: Staines 9'; L. Laulilii 18'; Doueihi 31'; Goals: Sezer 3/4 11', 32', 49 pen'	[Report Report]	Tries: Gray 14'; Koloamatangi 57'; Cook 77'; Goals: Myers 2/3 58', 78'; Sin bin: Kennar (yellow card) 31' to 41'	Stadium: Campbelltown Sports Stadium; Attendance: 11,420; Referee: Belinda Sharpe

Round 25: 24 August 2024	South Sydney Rabbitohs	16–36	Newcastle Knights	Sydney Olympic Park
19:35 AEST	Tries: Milne 16'; Wighton 19'; Duncan 69'; Goals: Myers 2/3 18', 20'; Sin bin: Murray (yellow card) 37' to 47'	[Report Report]	Tries: Sharpe 11'; Lucas 31'; Gagai 34', 76'; Cogger 52', 58'; Goals: Ponga 6/7 12', 33', 35', 37 pen', 53', 60'; Sin bin: Su'a (yellow card) 71' to 80'	Stadium: Accor Stadium; Attendance: 9,659; Referee: Chris Butler

Round 26: 30 August 2024	Penrith Panthers	34–12	South Sydney Rabbitohs	Penrith
20:00 AEST	Tries: Fisher-Harris 8'; Garner 12'; Schneider 24'; Turuva 42', 45'; Yeo 70'; Goals: Alamoti 5/6 9', 12', 25', 46', 72'	[Report Report]	Tries: Munro 33', 53'; Goals: Myers 2/2 34', 54'; Sin bin: Koloamatangi (yellow card) 68' to 78'	Stadium: BlueBet Stadium; Attendance: 20,176; Referee: Peter Gough

Round 27: 6 September 2024	South Sydney Rabbitohs	28–36	Sydney Roosters	Sydney Olympic Park
20:00 AEST	Tries: Gray 22', 78'; Walker 33'; Munro 70'; Burgess 73'; Goals: Cook 2/3 34', 71'; Burgess 1/1 74'; Hawkins 1/1 78'	[Report Report]	Tries: Nawaqanitawase 6'; Pauga 28', 37', 60'; Tupouniua 45'; Tedesco 48', 55'; Goals: Sua'ali'i 4/7 8', 47', 49', 62'	Stadium: Accor Stadium; Attendance: 19,674; Referee: Grant Atkins
