= 2023 NRL State Championship =

| South Sydney Rabbitohs | Brisbane Tigers |
|---|---|
| 42 | 22 |
| | 1 | 2 | Total |
|---|---|---|---|
| SOU | 12 | 30 | 42 |
| BRI | 6 | 16 | 22 |
- Date: 1 October 2023
- Stadium: Accor Stadium
- Location: Sydney

Broadcast partners

The 2023 National Rugby League State Championship was a rugby league match contested by 2023 NSW Cup premiers South Sydney Rabbitohs and 2023 Queensland Cup premiers the Brisbane Tigers.

The NRL State Championship match was played at Accor Stadium, Sydney, as a curtain raiser match for the 2023 NRLW Grand Final and the 2023 NRL Grand Final on 1 October 2023. South Sydney Rabbitohs defeated Brisbane Tigers 42–22 to win the Championship.

== Background ==
South Sydney Rabbithohs won the NSW Cup by defeated North Sydney Bears 22–18 in the Grand Final, and Brisbane Tigers won the Queensland Cup by defeating Burleigh Bears 22–18 in the Grand Final.

== Match details ==
2023 NRL State Championship

1 October 2023
13:20 AEDT

| South Sydney Rabbitohs | 42–22 | Brisbane Tigers |
|---|---|---|
| Tries: 8 Tyrone Munro 10', 37', 55'; Tom Carr 18'; Ethan O'Neill 49'; Dion Teaupa 51'; Tallis Duncan 75'; Goals: 5 Dean Hawkins 50', 53', 57', 72', 76' | 1st: 12–6; 2nd: 30–16; Match stats | Tries: 4 Cole Geyer 21'; Tom Rafter 62'; Solomona Faataape 78'; Kane Bradley 80'; Goals: 3 Jonah Pezet 22', 63', 80' |

Accor Stadium, Sydney
Referee: Wyatt Raymond
Bunker: Chris Butler

== See also ==
- 2023 NSW Cup season
- 2023 Queensland Cup
