= 2021 Sydney Roosters season =

NRL rugby league season

- NRL Rank: 5th
- Play-off result: Semi-finals (Lost 42–6 vs MAN, 1st Semi Final)
- 2021 record: Wins: 16; draws: 0; losses: 8
- Points scored: For: 630; against: 489

Team information
- CEO: Joe Kelly
- Coach: Trent Robinson
- Captain: ~~Jake Friend~~ → James Tedesco
- Stadium: Sydney Cricket Ground

Top scorers
- Tries: Daniel Tupou (15)
- Goals: Adam Keighran (35)
- Points: Adam Keighran (86)
← 2020	2022 →

The 2021 Sydney Roosters season is the 114th in the club's history and they are competing in the 2021 NRL season. The team is coached by Trent Robinson, coaching the club for his 9th consecutive season. Jake Friend started the season as club captain for the 7th consecutive season, however, was forced into medical retirement on 8 April 2021 due to multiple head-knocks. He was replaced by James Tedesco in his first season as captain.

== 2021 Squad ==
Sydney Roosters 2021 Squad
Top 30 Squad - 2021 Season			Development Players	Coaching Staff
Fletcher Baker – PR, SR; Egan Butcher – SR; Nat Butcher – LK, SR; Lindsay Collins – PR; Dale Copley – CE, WG; Angus Crichton – SR, LK; Drew Hutchison (gk) – FE, HB, SR; Matt Ikuvalu – WG, CE; Luke Keary – HB, FE; Adam Keighran (gk) – FE, HK, CE	Lachlan Lam (gk) – FE, HB, HK; Isaac Liu – PR, LK, SR; Freddy Lussick – HK; Joseph Manu – CE, FB, FE; Josh Morris – CE; Victor Radley – LK; Billy Smith – CE; Joseph Suaalii – CE, FB, WG; Daniel Suluka-Fifita – PR; Sio Siua Taukeiaho (gk) – PR, LK	James Tedesco (gk) (c) – FB; Daniel Tupou – WG; Sitili Tupouniua – SR; Sam Verrills – HK; Jared Waerea-Hargreaves (vc) – PR; Sam Walker (gk) – HB, FE	Lani Graham-Taufa – CE; Moala Graham-Taufa – WG, FB; Tuku Hau Tapuha – PR, SR; Ben Marschke – HK; Naufahu Whyte – SR; Extended squad: Brad Abbey (gk) – FB, WG, CE; Jesse Marschke – FE, HB; Ben Thomas – PR	Head coach: Trent Robinson; Assistant coaches: Craig Fitzgibbon; Matt King; Nathan Cayless; Jason Taylor (ISP NORTHS); Anthony Barnes (JF); Legend: (c) Captain(s); (vc) Vice-captain(s); (gk) Goal-kicker; Updated: 6 August 2021; Source(s): Roosters Team Profiles

== Transfers ==
=== 2021 Gains ===
Player	From	To
Adam Keighran	New Zealand Warriors	Sydney Roosters
Joseph Suaalii	South Sydney Rabbitohs	Sydney Roosters
Dale Copley	Brisbane Broncos	Sydney Roosters

=== 2021 Losses ===
Player	From	To
Mitchell Aubusson	Sydney Roosters	retired
Kyle Flanagan	Sydney Roosters	Canterbury-Bankstown Bulldogs
Poasa Faamausili	Sydney Roosters	St. George Illawarra Dragons
Ryan Hall	Sydney Roosters	Hull KR
Christian Tuipulotu	Sydney Roosters	Manly-Warringah Sea Eagles
Sonny Bill Williams	Sydney Roosters	released
Jake Friend	Sydney Roosters	retired
Brett Morris	Sydney Roosters	retired
Josh Morris	Sydney Roosters	retired
Boyd Cordner	Sydney Roosters	retired
