= Matthew French =

Matthew French may refer to:

- Matthew French (sport shooter)
- Matthew French (rugby league)
