= Teaupa (surname) =

Teaupa is a surname. Notable people with the surname include:

- Dion Teaupa (born 2002), Tongan rugby league player
- Sione Teaupa (born 1992), Tongan-Japanese rugby union player
