= 2023 NSW Cup season =

2023 New South Wales Cup
- Duration: 3 March - 24 September
- Teams: 13
- Premiers: South Sydney Rabbitohs (21st title)
- Minor premiers: North Sydney Bears
- Matches played: 150
- Top points scorer: Ronald Volkman (197)
- Player of the year: Dean Hawkins
- Top try-scorer: Clayton Faulalo (29)

The 2023 season of the New South Wales Cup was the 117th season of the premier state rugby league competition in New South Wales.

== Season summary ==
The 2023 season of the New South Wales Cup commenced on the 3 March. Teams played 26 regular competition rounds, with the top five teams qualifying for the final series in September.

Round 10 will be only played at 2 grounds as part of magic round that being North Sydney Oval and HE Laybutt Field

== Teams ==
There are 13 teams competing in the competition in 2023, with eleven based in New South Wales itself, as well as one in the Australian Capital Territory and one from New Zealand.

Colours	Club	Home ground(s)	Head coach
	Blacktown Workers Sea Eagles	4 Pines Park & HE Laybutt Field	Greg Boulous
	Canberra Raiders	GIO Stadium & Raiders Belconnen	Justin Giteau
	Canterbury-Bankstown Bulldogs	Belmore Sports Ground & Stadium Australia	David Tangata-Toa
	Newcastle Knights	McDonald Jones Stadium	Michael Monaghan
	Newtown Jets	Henson Park	George Ndaira
	New Zealand Warriors	Mount Smart Stadium	Slade Griffin
	North Sydney Bears	North Sydney Oval	Jason Taylor
	Parramatta Eels	Kellyville Oval & CommBank Stadium	Nathan Cayless
	Penrith Panthers	BlueBet Stadium	Ben Harden
	South Sydney Rabbitohs	Ironmark High Performance Centre & Stadium Australia	Joe O'Callaghan
	Sydney Roosters	Wentworth Park	Anthony Barnes
	St. George Illawarra Dragons	WIN Stadium & Netstrata Jubilee Stadium	Bronx Goodwin
	Western Suburbs Magpies	Lidcombe Oval	Wayne Lambkin

== Regular season ==
=== Ladder ===
2023 NSW Cup
Pos	Team	Pld	W	D	L	B	PF	PA	PD	Pts
1	North Sydney Bears	24	16	0	8	2	637	474	+163	36
2	South Sydney Rabbitohs	24	15	0	9	2	584	533	+51	34
3	New Zealand Warriors	24	14	1	9	2	630	470	+160	33
4	Canberra Raiders	24	14	1	9	2	554	476	+78	33
5	Blacktown Workers Sea Eagles	24	13	2	9	2	629	524	+105	32
6	Newtown Jets	24	13	1	10	2	644	511	+133	31
7	Penrith Panthers	24	13	0	11	2	564	482	+82	30
8	Canterbury-Bankstown Bulldogs	24	11	3	10	2	569	501	+68	29
9	Parramatta Eels	24	11	1	12	2	480	683	-203	27
10	St. George Illawarra Dragons	24	9	1	14	2	572	624	-52	23
11	Western Suburbs Magpies	24	8	2	14	2	508	685	-177	22
12	Newcastle Knights	24	8	0	16	2	516	749	-233	20
13	Sydney Roosters	24	5	0	19	2	492	667	-175	14

== Finals series ==
The top five teams qualified for the finals series, with these being Norths, Souths, New Zealand, Canberra and Blacktown.

Home	Score	Away	Match Information			
Home	Score	Away	Date and Time	Venue	Referee(s)	Crowd
QUALIFYING AND ELIMINATION FINAL
Canberra Raiders	24 – 22	Blacktown Workers Sea Eagles	Saturday 2 September, 1:00pm	North Sydney Oval		1,000
South Sydney Rabbitohs	26 – 12	New Zealand Warriors	Saturday 3 September, 3:00pm	North Sydney Oval		1,000
SEMI-FINALS
New Zealand Warriors	49 – 6	Canberra Raiders	Saturday 9 September, 1:00pm	Leichhardt Oval		3,000
North Sydney Bears	24 – 30	South Sydney Rabbitohs	Saturday 9 September, 3:00pm	Leichhardt Oval		3,000
PRELIMINARY FINAL
North Sydney Bears	28 – 24	New Zealand Warriors	Saturday 16 September, 3:00 pm	Leichhardt Oval		3,000
GRAND FINAL
South Sydney Rabbitohs	22 – 18	North Sydney Bears	Sunday 24 September, 3:00pm	CommBank Stadium		10,173

Qualifying and elimination finals
2	South Sydney	26
3	New Zealand	12
4	Canberra	24
5	Blacktown	22

Semi-finals
1	North Sydney	24
South Sydney	30
New Zealand	49
Canberra	6

Preliminary final
North Sydney	28
New Zealand	24

Grand final
South Sydney	22
North Sydney	18

== Grand Final ==
Both Souths and Norths went into the Grand Final with lengthy droughts, at 40 and 30 years respectively. The two sides also met in a NSW Cup Grand Final for the first time in 97 years (1926).

2023 The Knock-On Effect NSW Cup Grand Final

Sunday, 24 September
15:00 AEST (UTC+10)

South Sydney Rabbitohs	22 – 18	North Sydney Bears
Tries: 4 Mitchell 14'; O'Neill 32'; Carr 51'; Munro 75'; Goals: 4 Hawkins 16', 34', 76' (3/4)	1st: 12–12; 2nd: 10–8; Report	Tries: 3 Smalley 5'; Marschke 25'; Porter 68'; Goals: 3 Hayman 27', 40', 70' (2/3)

CommBank Stadium, Sydney
Attendance: 10,173
Player of the Match: Dean Hawkins

== NRL State Championship ==
As premiers of the NSW Cup, the South Sydney Rabbitohs will face Queensland Cup premiers Brisbane Tigers in the NRL State Championship match.

2023 NRL State Championship

Sunday, 1 October
13:20pm AEDT (UTC+11)

South Sydney Rabbitohs	42 – 22	Brisbane Tigers
	1st: 12 – 6; 2nd: 30 – 16

Accor Stadium, Sydney
Referee: Wyatt Raymond
Bunker: Chris Butler
Touch judges: Tyson Brough, Cameron Paddy

== Awards ==
- Player of the Year: Dean Hawkins
- Top Tryscorer: Clayton Faulalo (29)
- Top Pointscorer: Ronald Volkman (197)

=== Team of the Year ===
Position	Nat	Winner	Club
Fullback	(Australia)	Isaiah Iongi	Penrith Panthers
Wing	(New Zealand)	Clayton Faulalo	Blacktown Workers Sea Eagles
Centre	(Cook Islands)	Kayal Iro	Newtown Jets
Centre	(New Zealand)	Ali Leiataua	New Zealand Warriors
Wing	(New Zealand)	Fetalaiga Pauga	North Sydney Bears
Five-eighth	(Australia)	Jesse Marschke	North Sydney Bears
Halfback	(Australia)	Dean Hawkins	South Sydney Rabbitohs
Prop	(Australia)	Liam Henry	Penrith Panthers
Hooker	(Greece)	Peter Mamouzelos	South Sydney Rabbitohs
Prop	(Australia)	Trey Mooney	Canberra Raiders
Second-row	(Australia)	Clay Webb	Canberra Raiders
Second-row	(New Zealand)	Kalani Going	New Zealand Warriors
Lock	(Australia)	Zach Dockar-Clay	North Sydney Bears

== See also ==
- 2023 New South Wales Rugby League
