= Trent Robinson =

Australian rugby league coach and footballer

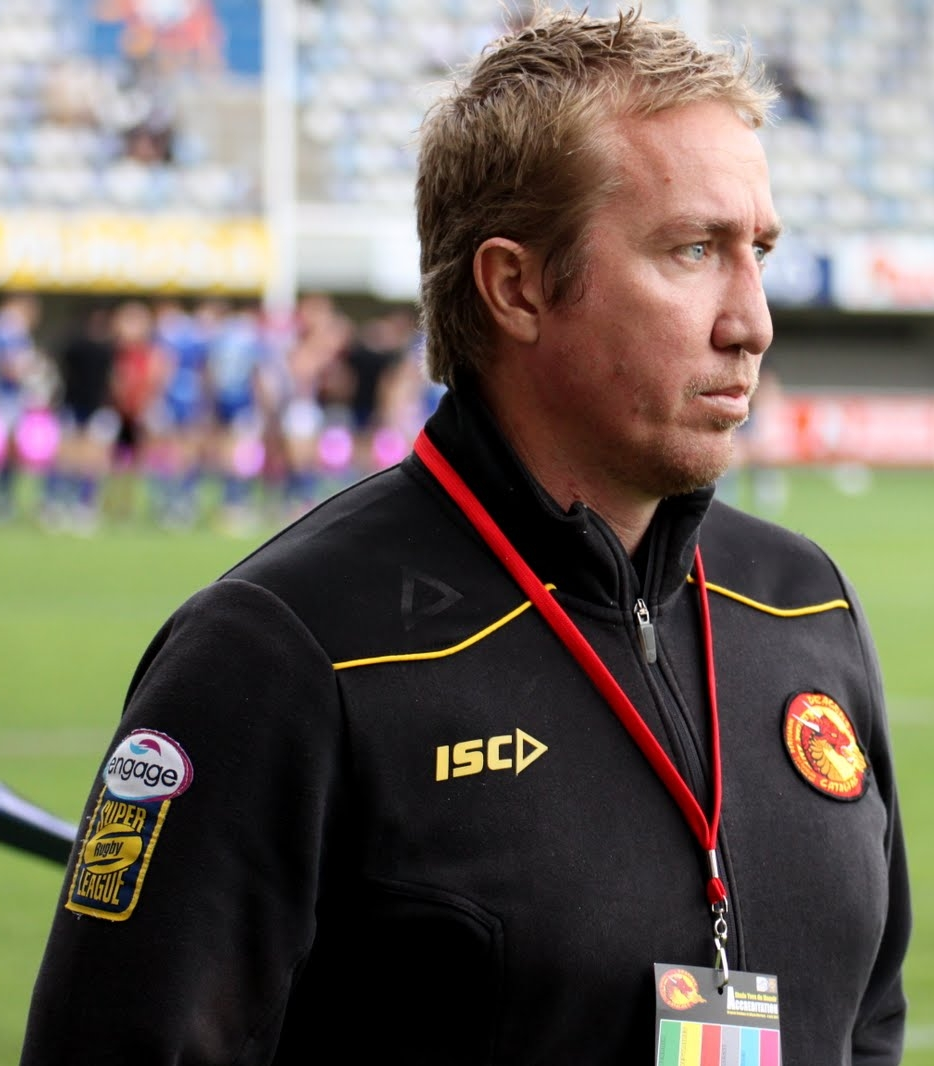

Personal information
- Full name: Trent Robinson
- Born: 15 March 1977 (age 49) Camden, New South Wales, Australia

Playing information
- Position: Lock, Prop, Second-row
Club
Years	Team	Pld	T	G	FG	P
2000–01	Wests Tigers	3	0	0	0	0
2002	Parramatta Eels	1	0	0	0	0
	Total	4	0	0	0	0

Coaching information
Club
Years	Team	Gms	W	D	L	W%
2005–06	Toulouse Olympique
2011–12	Catalans Dragons	63	37	1	25	59
2013–	Sydney Roosters	365	230	0	135	63
	Total	428	267	1	160	62
- Source: As of 15 August 2026

Trent Robinson (born 15 March 1977) is an Australian professional rugby league coach who is the head coach of the Sydney Roosters in the National Rugby League (NRL) and a former professional rugby league footballer. Robinson is widely considered as one of the greatest head coaches in rugby league history. He has led the Roosters to 4 premierships during his tenure, including back-to-back premierships in 2018 and 2019, which at the time, was the first a club had ever done so during the NRL era.

He has previously held coaching positions at Toulouse Olympique in the Elite One Championship and the Newcastle Knights in the NRL and was the head coach at the Catalans Dragons in the Super League. As a player he made appearances as a prop and lock for the Wests Tigers and the Parramatta Eels in the NRL and Toulouse in the Elite One Championship.

== Background ==
Robinson was born in Camden, a suburb located in Greater Sydney, New South Wales, Australia. He attended St Gregory's College, Campbelltown where he excelled academically and played rugby league.

== Playing career ==
A former student at St Gregory's College, Campbelltown, Robinson started his playing days in the Sydney Roosters pathways in the Jersey Flegg and Presidents Cup as an up-and-coming front rower.

In the top grade, Robinson played three games from the bench for the Wests Tigers between 2000 and 2001. He made his debut off the bench in Round 24 of the 2000 NRL Season in a 22-18 loss to the Canterbury-Bankstown Bulldogs. He was the first player to ever make his first-grade debut with Wests Tigers without having previously played first-grade with another team. He subsequently played in Rounds 19 and 20 in the 2001 NRL Season. In 2002, he joined the Brian Smith-coached Parramatta Eels, playing in a solitary game against the South Sydney Rabbitohs in Round 22 of the 2002 NRL Season.

Robinson moved to France in 2002, where he spent three seasons with Toulouse Olympique, including playing in their run to the Challenge Cup semi-finals in 2005. He retired from playing at the age of 28 following an arm injury sustained in a play-off match against Pia.

== Coaching career ==
=== Toulouse Olympique ===
After ending his playing career with Toulouse Olympique, Robinson, then aged just 28, was appointed to succeed Justin Morgan as head coach in 2005. He led Toulouse to the Championship final in the 2005–06 season before departing after one year to return to Australia.

=== Newcastle Knights ===
He was an assistant coach with the Newcastle Knights for three seasons (2007-2009) before seeking a release to join Brian Smith at the Sydney Roosters.

=== Sydney Roosters (Assistant Coach) ===
Robinson joined the Roosters in 2010 as an NRL Assistant Coach. He oversaw the team’s defence and in an incredible turnaround, the Club finished the year as runners-up in the NRL Grand Final, after placing last in the competition in 2009.

=== Catalans Dragons ===
At the conclusion of the 2010 Super League season, the French-speaking Robinson took over from Kevin Walters as coach at Catalans Dragons. He held this position until the end of 2012.

In his first season with the Dragons, Robinson took the side from last to sixth and was named ‘Super League Coach of the Year’ with his side making two consecutive Preliminary Finals.

=== Sydney Roosters ===
Robinson is currently the longest-serving Head Coach in the Foundation Club’s 116-year history and has led his side to the Finals in all but one season (2016).

On 7 September 2012, it was announced that Robinson had been appointed as head coach of the Sydney Roosters on a three-year contract, commencing in 2013.

He led the Sydney Roosters to Premiership success in his maiden season as an NRL Head Coach. In a memorable year, he became only the second rookie NRL coach to claim a Minor Premiership and became the youngest-ever recipient of the Dally M Award for Coach of the Year.

He capped this historic season by leading the Roosters to the Club’s 13th Premiership, becoming only the sixth rookie coach Premiership winner.

At the end of the 2013 season, Robinson received the Rugby League International Federation’s Coach of the Year award. In early 2014, the Sydney Roosters were also crowned World Club Champions after defeating Super League Champions Wigan 36-14 in the annual World Club Challenge.

The Sydney Roosters also claimed successive Minor Premierships and Club Championships under Robinson's tenure and qualified for the Preliminary Final in 2014. In 2015, the Sydney Roosters became the first team to claim a third consecutive Minor Premiership in the modern era, with the side also qualifying for the Preliminary Final. While injuries and suspension impacted the Club’s 2016 campaign, the Sydney Roosters were crowned champions at the 2017 NRL Auckland Nines and rounded out their campaign with a preliminary finals appearance.

In 2018, Robinson’s Sydney Roosters claimed their 14th Premiership, in a grand final dubbed a “coaching masterclass”. In his sixth season at the helm of the Club, the Roosters also secured a record 20th Minor Premiership.

In the 2019 NRL season, Robinson led the Sydney Roosters to the Club’s 15th Premiership, and became the first coach to win back-to-back Premierships in a unified competition since 1992-93.

After claiming the Club’s 15th Premiership in 2019, the Sydney Roosters kicked off their 2020 campaign by being crowned World Club Champions for the second successive year. In the coronavirus-impacted 2020 season, Robinson was a member of the NRL’s Project Apollo working group which worked on ensuring the resumption of the competition after it was halted for two months as a consequence of the worldwide pandemic. Despite a season impacted by an unprecedented injury toll, early retirements and suspension, the Roosters completed the 2021 regular season in fifth position. The club’s campaign ended in the second week of finals, but Robinson was recognised for his outstanding coaching efforts throughout the season by being named a Dally M Coach of the Year finalist.

Robinson made history in the 2022 NRL season, when he became the first person to coach 250 first-grade games in Roosters’ history. He was again named a finalist for the Dally M Coach of the Year for his coaching resolve and leadership which saw his side go on an eight-match winning streak to finish the regular season in sixth place on the ladder and qualify for the Finals Series.

In the Roosters’ first full season at the new Sydney Football Stadium, the 2023 NRL season saw Robinson’s Sydney Roosters go on a surge in the back end of the season to qualify for the Finals in seventh spot. With only a few rounds remaining it appeared the club would miss the finals, however they would go on a five-game winning run to secure their position in the Top 8. In the elimination final against Cronulla, the club pulled off a 13-12 upset victory. The following week, the Sydney Roosters went in as outsiders against Melbourne and with 10 minutes remaining lead the match 13-12 before Melbourne scored a try with two minutes remaining to knock the Sydney Roosters out of the finals race. In the 2024 NRL season, Robinson guided the club to a third placed finish on the table. The club would eventually reach the preliminary final stage but were comprehensively beaten by Melbourne ending their season.

In the 2025 NRL season, Robinson guided the Sydney Roosters to an 8th placed finish on the table despite many pundits before the year starting who predicted the club to miss the finals due to a high squad turnover in the off-season. The Sydney Roosters were eliminated in the opening week of the finals by Cronulla.

Robinson successfully led the Sydney Roosters to their 16th Premiership in the 2026 NRL season following a comeback victory against the Newcastle Knights surmounting an early 12-0 deficit.

== Coaching Honours ==
Team - Sydney Roosters

- NRL Premiership: 2013, 2018, 2019, 2026
- NRL Minor Premiership: 2013, 2014, 2015, 2018
- World Club Challenge: 2014, 2019, 2020
- NRL Nines: 2017

Individual

- Super League Coach of the Year: 2011
- Dally M Coach of the Year: 2013
- Rugby League International Federation Coach of the Year: 2013

== Statistics ==
Coaching results by season
Team	Season	Games	Wins	Draws	Losses	Win %	Season result
	2011	31	17	1	13	55	Lost 2011 Super League Preliminary Semi-Final v Wigan Warriors 0—44
	2012	32	20	0	12	63	Lost 2012 Super League Preliminary Semi-Final v Leeds Rhinos 20—27
Catalans Dragons		63	37	1	25	59	―
	2013	27	21	0	6	78	Won 2013 NRL Grand Final v Manly Warringah Sea Eagles 26—18
	2014	26	17	0	10	63	Lost 2014 NRL Preliminary Final v South Sydney Rabbitohs 22—32
	2015	27	19	0	8	70	Lost 2015 NRL Preliminary Final v Brisbane Broncos 12—31
	2016	24	6	0	18	25	Finished the 2016 NRL season in 15th position out of 16
	2017	26	18	0	8	69	Lost 2017 NRL Preliminary Final v North Queensland Cowboys 16—29
	2018	27	19	0	8	70	Won 2018 NRL Grand Final v Melbourne Storm 21—6
	2019	27	20	0	7	74	Won 2019 NRL Grand Final v Canberra Raiders 14—8
	2020	22	14	0	8	64	Lost 2020 NRL Semi-Final v Canberra Raiders 18—22
	2021	26	17	0	9	65	Lost 2021 NRL Semi-Final v Manly Sea Eagles 6—42
	2022	25	15	0	10	60	Lost 2022 NRL Semi-Final v South Sydney Rabbitohs 14-30
	2023	26	14	0	12	54	Lost 2023 NRL Semi-Final v Melbourne Storm 13—18
	2024	27	17	0	10	62	Lost 2024 NRL Preliminary Final v Melbourne Storm 18—48
	2025	25	13	0	12	52	Lost 2025 NRL Elimination Final v Cronulla Sharks 10—20
	2026	28	19	0	9	67	Won 2026 NRL Grand Final v Newcastle Knights 19—18
Sydney Roosters		363	229	0	135	63	―
Career		426	266	1	160	62	Statistics correct as of 5 Oct 2026
