= Matt Ikuvalu =

Australian rugby league footballer

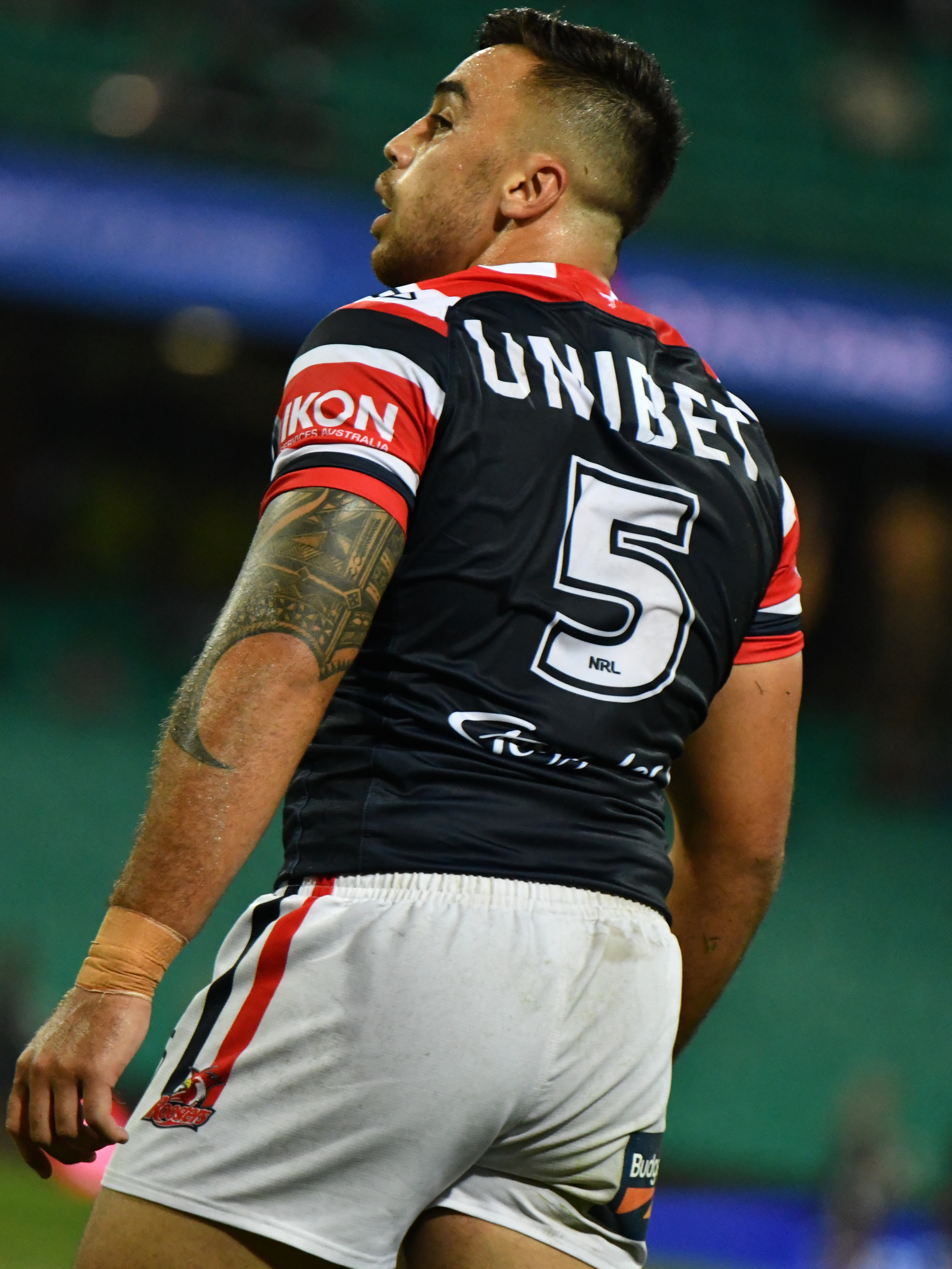

Personal information
- Full name: Matthew Ikuvalu
- Born: 9 November 1993 (age 33) Sydney, New South Wales, Australia
- Height: 184 cm (6 ft 0 in)
- Weight: 100 kg (15 st 10 lb)

Playing information
- Position: Wing, Centre
Club
Years	Team	Pld	T	G	FG	P
2018–21	Sydney Roosters	38	25	0	0	100
2022–23	Cronulla Sharks	5	4	0	0	16
2023–24	Catalans Dragons	37	12	0	0	48
	Total	80	41	0	0	164
- Source: As of 6 January 2025

Matt Ikuvalu (born 9 November 1993) is an Australian professional rugby league footballer who plays as a winger or centre for the Wyong Roos in the Central Coast Division Rugby League.

He previously played for the Sydney Roosters and the Cronulla-Sutherland Sharks in the National Rugby League (NRL), and the Catalan Dragons in the Super League.

== Background ==
Ikuvalu was born in Sydney, New South Wales, Australia, and is of Tongan and European descent.

He played junior rugby league for the Gosford Kariong Storm. He later transferred to the Erina Eagles while attending Narara Valley High School.

Ikuvalu played for Manly Warringah in the Under 20s competition, The Toyota Cup, in 2011 and 2012.

== Career ==
=== 2018 ===
Ikuvalu made his first grade debut in round 13 of the 2018 NRL season against the Wests Tigers.

=== 2019 ===
Ikuvalu joined the Sydney Roosters in their World Club Challenge 20–8 victory over Wigan before the start of the 2019 NRL season.

=== 2020 ===
In round 9 of the 2020 NRL season, Ikuvalu was called into the Sydney Roosters team 15 minutes before kick off due to an injury suffered by Brett Morris in the warm up. Ikuvalu went on to score five tries in the 42–16 win over North Queensland. He became the first Sydney Roosters player since 1955 to score five tries in a game.

=== 2021 ===
In round 9 of the 2021 NRL season, he scored a hat-trick for the Sydney Roosters in their 31–18 loss against Parramatta.

In round 14 of the 2021 NRL season, he scored two tries in a 35–34 victory over the Gold Coast.

In round 18, he scored two tries in a 34–18 victory over North Queensland. On 27 July, it was announced that he would be ruled out from playing for an indefinite period after suffering a syndesmosis injury.

At the conclusion of the 2021 season, Ikuvalu was released from the final year of his contract to take up a deal with the Cronulla-Sutherland Sharks, following his assistant coach at the Roosters Craig Fitzgibbon in departing the club for Cronulla-Sutherland.

=== 2022 ===
In round 23 of the 2022 NRL season, he scored two tries for Cronulla in a 40–6 victory over rivals Manly in the battle of the beaches game.

=== 2023 ===
On 23 April, Ikuvalu was granted an immediate release from his Cronulla contract to join Super League side the Catalans Dragons. On 14 October, Ikuvalu played in Catalans 2023 Super League Grand Final loss against Wigan.

=== 2024 ===
Ikuvalu played 22 matches for Catalans in the 2024 Super League season which saw the club miss the playoffs finishing 7th. Ikuvalu left Catalans at the end of the 2024 season

=== 2025 ===
In January 2025, Ikuvalu joined the Wyong Roos.

== Statistics ==
=== NRL / Super league ===
Season	Team	Matches	T	G	GK %	F/G	Pts
2018	Sydney Roosters	3	1	0	—	0	4
2019	Sydney Roosters	10	3	0	—	0	12
2020	Sydney Roosters	10	7	0	—	0	28
2021	Sydney Roosters	15	14	0	—	0	56
2022	Cronulla-Sutherland	5	4	0	—	0	16
2023	Catalans Dragons	5	2				
2024	Catalans Dragons	18	5				20
Career totals		73	39	0	—	0	156
