= Alexandria Park Community School =

School in New South Wales, Australia

Location
- Park Road, Alexandria, New South Wales; Australia; 33°54′03″S 151°11′47″E

Information
- Type: Government-controlled partially selective comprehensive co-educational secondary and primary day school
- Motto: Community, Opportunity, Success
- Established: December 2001
- School district: Port Jackson
- Educational authority: New South Wales Department of Education
- Principal: Debra Lade
- Teaching staff: 76.95 FTE (2020)
- Years: K–12
- Enrolment: 911 (2020)
- Website: alexparkcs-c.schools.nsw.gov.au

Alexandria Park Community School is a government school for primary and secondary students located at Park Road, Alexandria, a south Sydney inner suburb, New South Wales, Australia. The school is a public-funded, partially academically selective, comprehensive, co-educational day school. The school had over 1188 enrollments in 2023. 18% of students identified as Indigenous Australians and 58% were from a language background other than English. Opportunity classes are delivered in Year 5 and Year 6, as well as a selective stream in Year 7 to Year 12 for academically gifted and talented students. The school is operated by the NSW Department of Education in accordance with a curriculum developed by the New South Wales Education Standards Authority.

== History ==
The school was established in December 2001 upon the merger of Cleveland Street High School, which had been relocated in 1982, with Waterloo High School. In 2003, Redfern Public School, Waterloo Public School and Alexandria Public School were further merged into the school.

== Programs and initiatives ==
The Cleveland Street High School was located on the corner of Cleveland and Chalmers Streets in Surry Hills prior to its move to the current Alexandria Park Community School site in 1982. The Cleveland Street site became Cleveland Street Intensive English High School. In December 2001, Waterloo High School and Cleveland Street High School amalgamated to become Alexandria Park Community School. From 1 January 2003, the school expanded with the amalgamation of Redfern Public School, Waterloo Public School, Alexandria Public School into the new Community School.

Until 2017, the junior school was located at the Park Road Campus, and the senior school was located at the Mitchell Road Campus. In 2017 the senior school relocated into temporary buildings (pop-up school) at the Park Road Campus, with the intention that the Mitchell Road Campus would be occupied by the Cleveland Street Intensive English High School, freeing up the Cleveland Street site for a new 14 storey high school.

In 2018, the junior school moved into the expanded pop-up school on Park Road. The Cleveland Street Intensive English High School moved to the original Park Road Campus, pending the rebuild of the Mitchell Road campus, which completed in 2019.

Phase 1 of the redevelopment was completed in 2020 with Phase 2 completed in February 2023. The High School and Primary School moved into the completed buildings to make way for the demolition of the temporary buildings. Phase 1 provided new permanent learning spaces and core facilities for 1,000 primary students and approximately 500 secondary students. It commenced operations from the beginning of Term 4 2020. Phase 2 of the redevelopment expanded to accommodate new permanent learning spaces for 850 secondary students, plus a multipurpose hall, gymnasium, multiple sports courts and outdoor play spaces. It was completed in February 2023. The overall masterplan will allow Alexandria Park Community School to cater for 1,000 primary students and up to 1,200 secondary students. Additional learning spaces as part of future Stage 2 works are subject to enrolment demand.

== Awards ==
In 2013, the School received a NSW Department of Education director general's award for 'Improving Student Learning Outcomes'.

== Notable alumni ==
- William Hickey – NBL basketballer
- Biwali Bayles – NBL basketballer
- Tyrone Munro – NRL footballer

== See also ==
- List of government schools in New South Wales
- List of selective high schools in New South Wales
- Education in Australia
