= Wayne Lambkin =

Australian rugby league footballer & coach

Personal information
- Full name: Wayne Lambkin
- Born: 12 September 1972 (age 54)

Playing information
- Position: Second-row
Club
Years	Team	Pld	T	G	FG	P
1987–88	Western Suburbs	18	0	2	0	4
- Source: As of 23 December 2022

Wayne Lambkin (born 12 September 1972) is an Australian former professional rugby league footballer who played in the 1980s. He has played for Western Suburbs in the NSWRL competition. Since retirement, Lambkin has coached numerous lower grade sides in the NSWRL and NSW Cup competitions.

== Playing career ==
Lambkin made his first grade debut for Western Suburbs in round 1 of the 1987 NSWRL season against Penrith at Penrith Stadium. Lambkin played two seasons with the struggling club as they finished both years with the Wooden Spoon.

== Coaching career ==
Lambkin coached the North Sydney NSW Cup side from 2006 to 2015 and guided them to the 2007 NSW Cup Grand Final along with several other finals appearances. In 2017, Lambkin guided Manly to the NRL Under-20s title where they defeated Parramatta in the grand final. Between 2019 and 2021, Lambkin was head coach of the Wests Tigers Jersey Flegg team and was later promoted as Western Suburbs NSW Cup head coach for 2022. In 2024, Lambkin was head coach of the Blacktown Workers Sea Eagles in the NSW Cup.
