= Liam Le Blanc =

Australian rugby league footballer

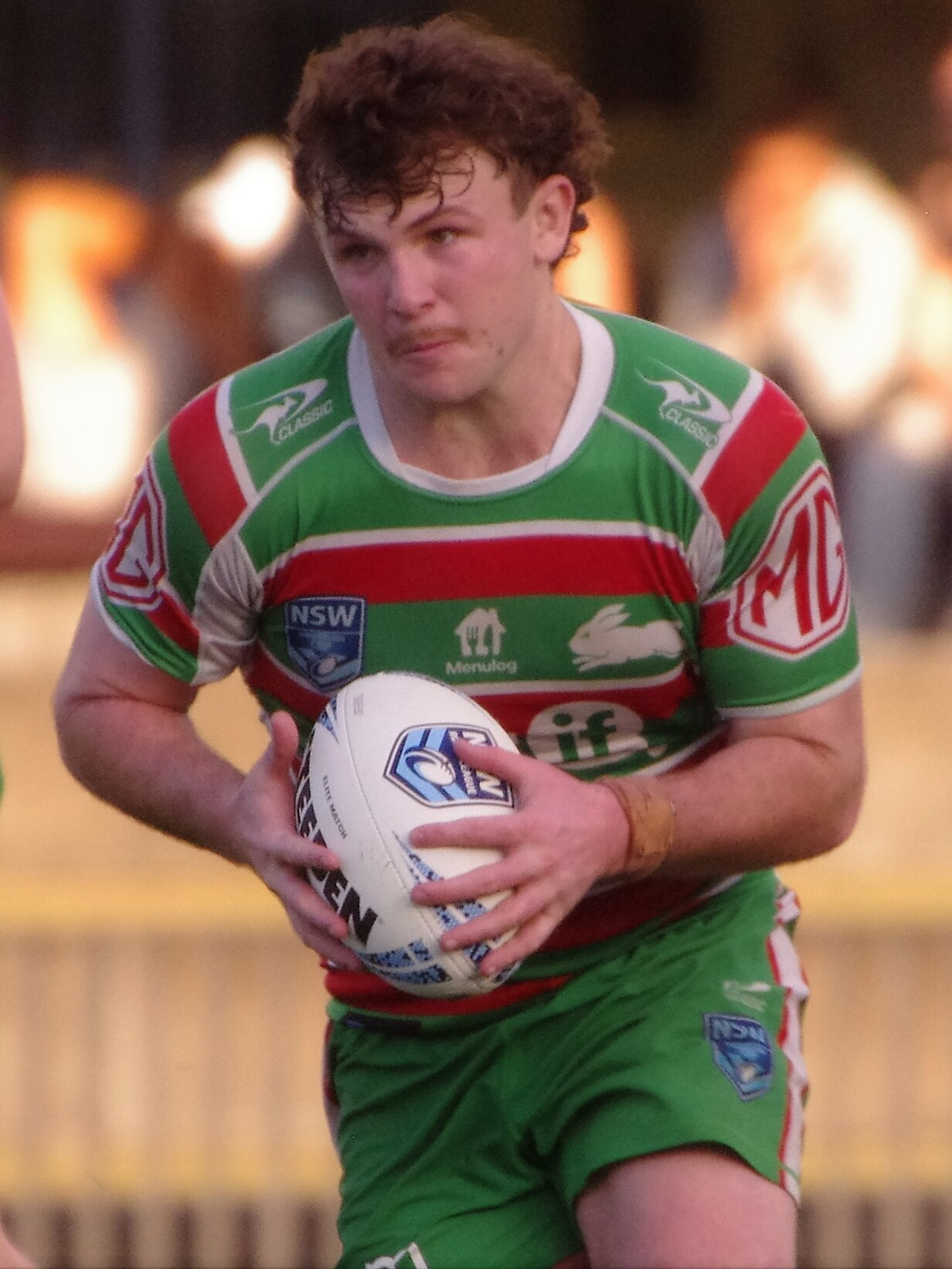

Personal information
- Full name: Liam Le Blanc
- Born: 13 September 2004 (age 22) Ingham, Queensland, Australia
- Height: 185 cm (6 ft 1 in)
- Weight: 98 kg (15 st 6 lb)

Playing information
- Position: Lock
Club
Years	Team	Pld	T	G	FG	P
2024–26	South Sydney	27	1	0	0	4
- Source: As of 2 August 2026

Liam Le Blanc (born 13 September 2004) is an Australian professional rugby league footballer who plays as a lock forward for the Penrith Panthers in the NRL.

== Early life ==
Le Blanc was born in Ingham, Queensland and played his junior football for the Norths Devils in Brisbane. He represented Queensland City under-17s and was selected for the Australian Schoolboys team in 2022.

== Playing career ==
=== South Sydney ===
Le Blanc joined the South Sydney Rabbitohs in 2022 through their Southeast Queensland Elite Pathway Program. He progressed through the SG Ball and Jersey Flegg Cup teams before making his NRL debut.

=== 2024 ===
Le Blanc made his first-grade debut in Round 16 of the 2024 NRL season, coming off the bench in South Sydney’s 14–0 victory over the Manly-Warringah Sea Eagles at Accor Stadium on 22 June 2024. He made 11 tackles with 100% efficiency and ran for 39 metres.

=== 2025 ===
In April 2025, South Sydney announced that Le Blanc had been promoted to the club’s Top 30 squad and extended his contract through the end of the 2026 season. Le Blanc played 15 matches for South Sydney in the 2025 NRL season which saw the club finish 14th on the table.
