= Dean Hawkins =

Australian rugby league footballer

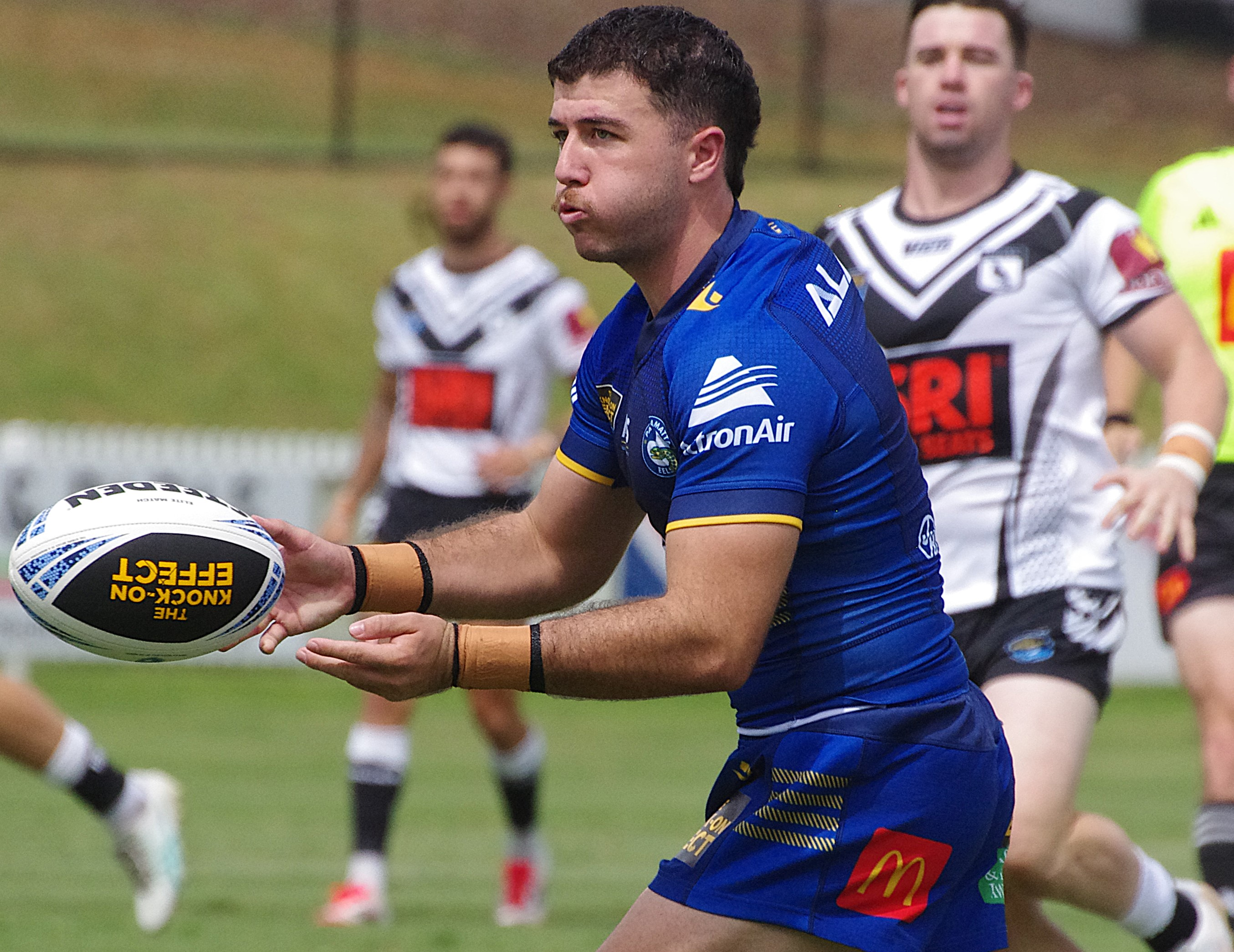

Personal information
- Full name: Dean Hawkins
- Born: 10 March 1999 (age 27) Randwick, New South Wales, Australia
- Height: 5 ft 11 in (1.80 m)
- Weight: 13 st 3 lb (84 kg)

Playing information
- Position: Scrum-half, Stand-off
Club
| Years | Team | Pld | T | G | FG | P |
|---|---|---|---|---|---|---|
| 2021–24 | South Sydney | 14 | 1 | 10 | 0 | 24 |
| 2025 | Parramatta Eels | 12 | 2 | 0 | 0 | 8 |
| 2026– | London Broncos | 21 | 10 | 50 | 1 | 141 |
| | Total | 47 | 13 | 60 | 1 | 173 |
- Source: As of 19 November 2026

Dean Hawkins (born 10 March 1999) is an Australian professional rugby league footballer who plays as a scrum-half and stand-off for the London Broncos in the Super League.

He has previously played for the South Sydney Rabbitohs and the Parramatta Eels in the NRL.

== Playing career ==
=== Early career ===
Hawkins made his NSW Cup debut for the North Sydney Bears in March 2018.

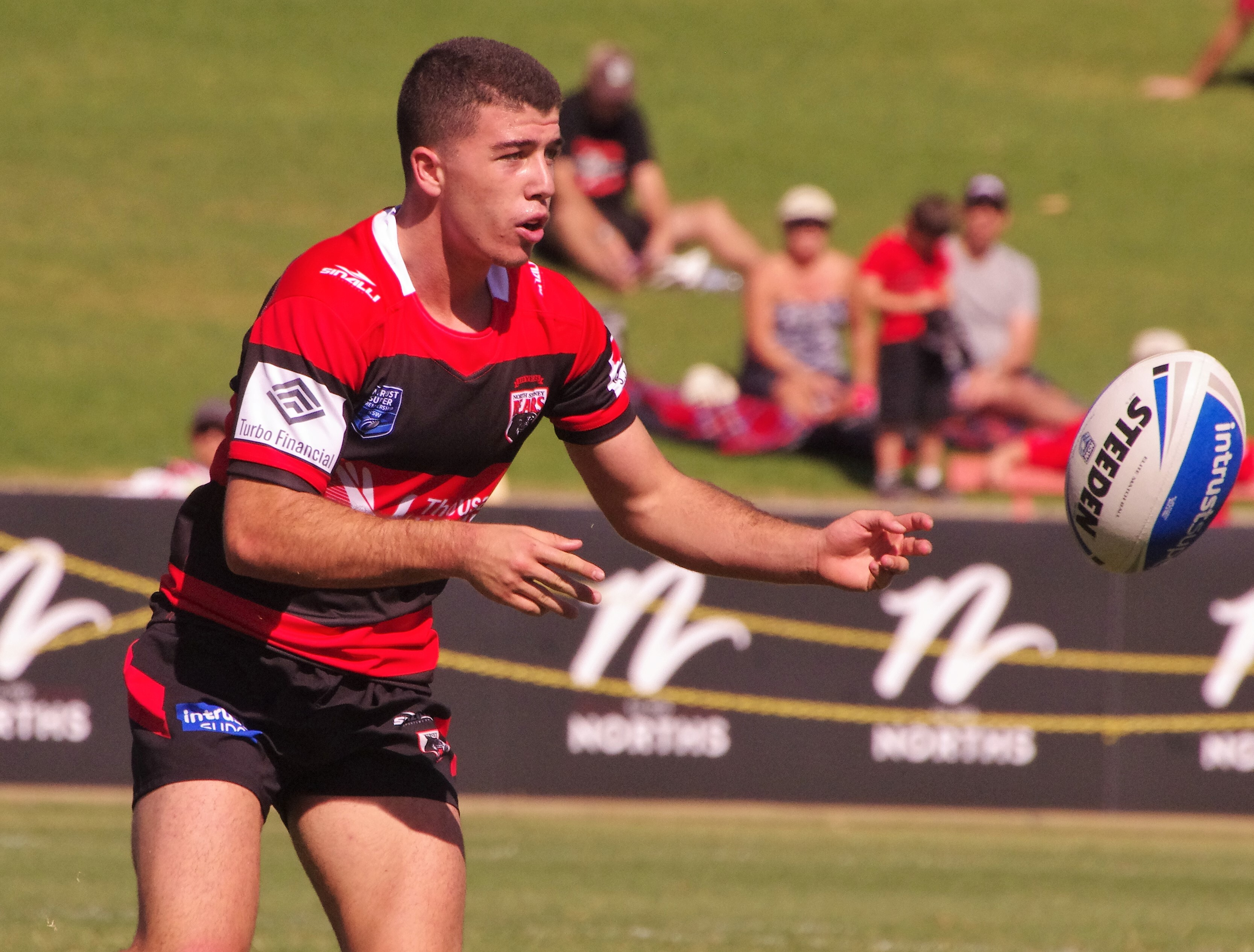
Hawkins playing for the North Sydney Bears in the NSW Cup in April 2018

=== 2021 ===
Hawkins made his first grade debut in round 5 of the 2021 NRL season for South Sydney against the Brisbane Broncos.

=== 2022 ===
Hawkins made only one first grade appearance for South Sydney in the 2022 NRL season which was a 26-0 victory over Parramatta in round 22 of the competition.

=== 2023 ===
Hawkins made just two first grade appearances for South Sydney in the 2023 NRL season, in rounds 15 and 19 of the competition.

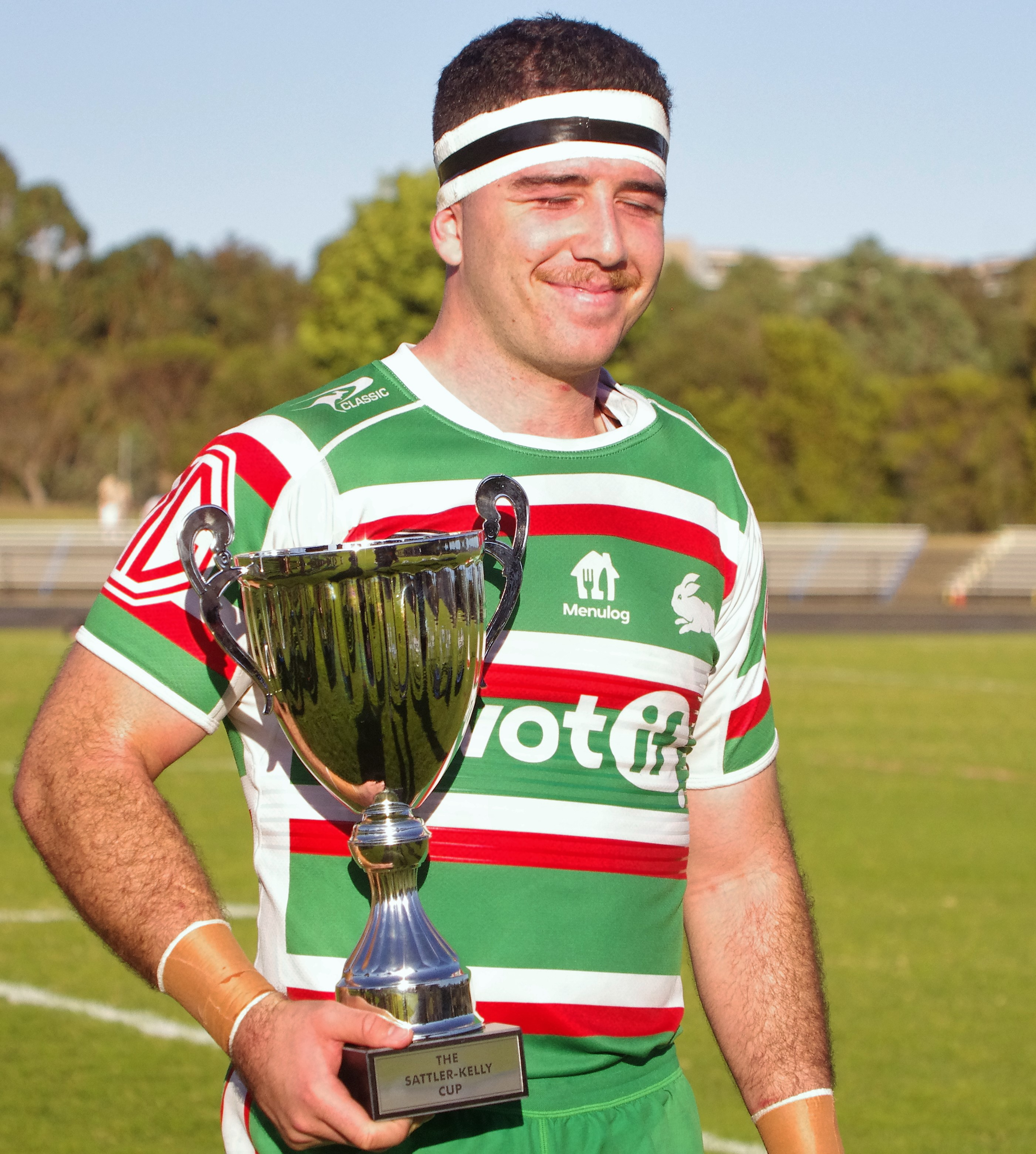
Hawkins with the Sattler-Kelly Cup in 2023

In the NSW Cup competition, South Sydney finished the regular season in second place and defeated the New Zealand Warriors in first week of the semi-finals, with Hawkins kicking five goals. On 4 September, Hawkins was named as The Knock-On Effect NSW Cup Player of the Year at the Brad Fittler Medal Awards ceremony.

On 24 September, Hawkins played for South Sydney in their 2023 NSW Cup grand final victory over North Sydney.

=== 2024 ===
In round 3 of the 2024 NRL season, Hawkins was called into the South Sydney team as a replacement for the demoted Lachlan Ilias. South Sydney would lose their round 3 match against arch-rivals the Sydney Roosters 48-6. In round 7, Hawkins sustained a quad injury in the clubs 42-12 loss against Penrith which ruled Hawkins out from playing for two months.

On 8 September, it was announced that Hawkins would be departing the South Sydney club after not being offered a new contract. On 27 September 2024, Hawkins signed with the Parramatta Eels on a two-year deal.

=== 2025 ===
In round 3 of the 2025 NRL season, Hawkins made his club debut for Parramatta in their 16-8 loss against arch-rivals Canterbury. In round 12, Hawkins was recalled into the Parramatta side for their round 12 game against Manly where he provided four try assists as Parramatta won 30-10. Hawkins played 12 games for Parramatta in the 2025 NRL season as the club finished 11th on the table.

In late October Hawkins was granted a release from the final year of his Parramatta contract in order to pursue other opportunities. On October 24th he joined the London Broncos, playing in the Betfred Championship.

=== 2026 ===
Hawkins made a try-scoring debut for the London Broncos in the round one victory over the Widnes Vikings at Plough Lane.

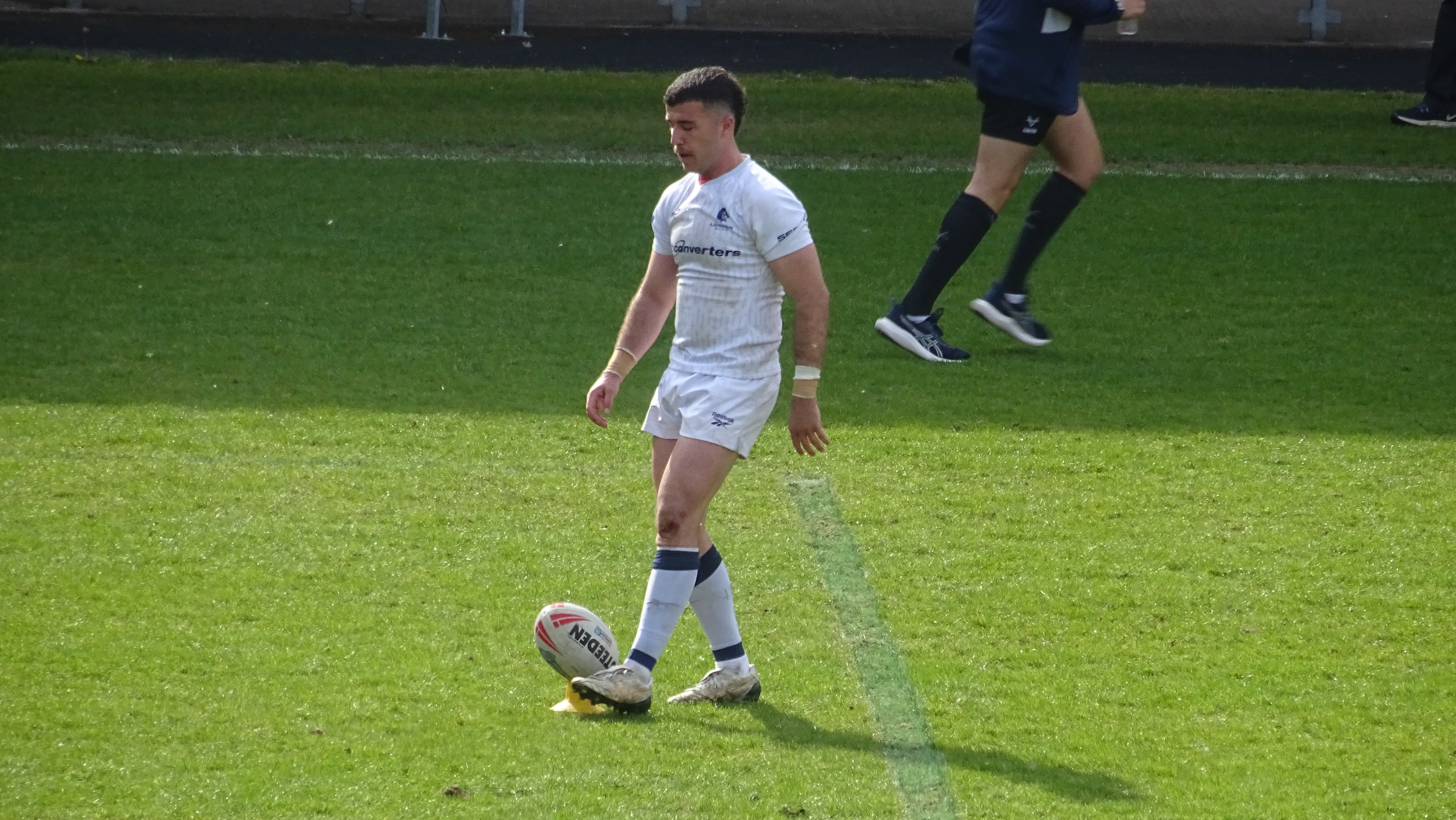
Hawkins preparing to kick at goal against Doncaster at the Eco-Power Stadium in 2026

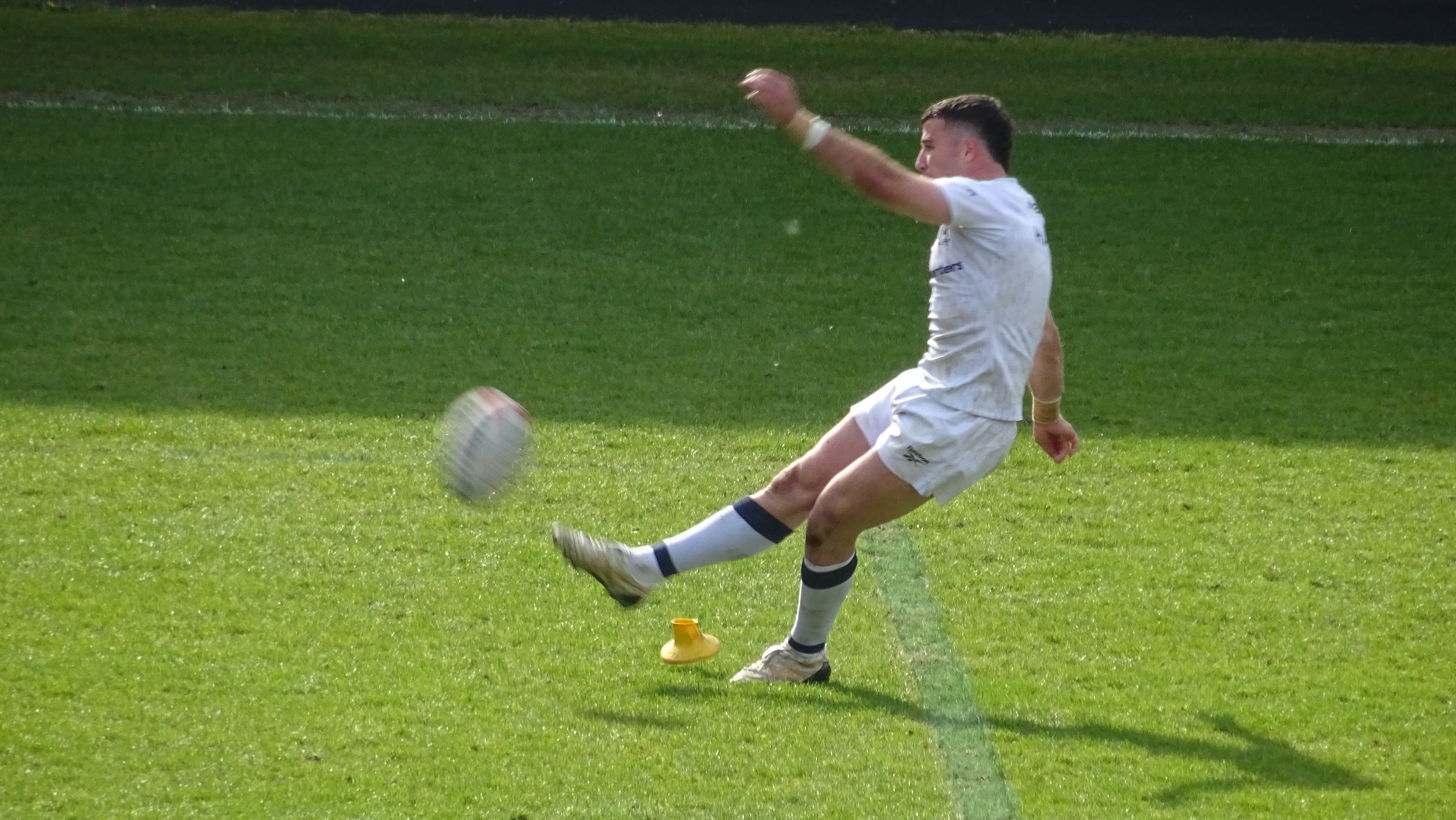
Hawkins kicking at goal at Doncaster in 2026

In August 2026, he was part of the Broncos squad that lifted the RFL Championship Leaders' Shield.

On 31 August 2026 in the 2026 RFL 1895 Cup final he won the Ray French Award for his Man of the Match performance.

In October 2026, he played in the Broncos Championship Grand Final victory over Doncaster at Plough Lane.

== Personal life ==
Hawkins is known by the nickname "Footy Dean" which came from the Youtube channel he created several years earlier where he showcased off his Rugby League skills which included kicking and tackling.

== Club statistics ==
| Year | Club | League Competition | Appearances | Tries | Goals | Drop goals | Points | Notes |
|---|---|---|---|---|---|---|---|---|
| 2018 | North Sydney Bears | 2018 NSW Cup season | 19 | 2 | 57 | 1 | 123 | |
| 2019 | South Sydney Rabbitohs | 2019 NSW Cup season | 11 | 2 | 11 | 0 | 30 | |
| 2021 | South Sydney Rabbitohs | 2021 NRL season | 3 | 0 | 0 | 0 | 0 | |
| 2021 | South Sydney Rabbitohs | 2021 NSW Cup season | 8 | 0 | 24 | 0 | 48 | |
| 2022 | South Sydney Rabbitohs | 2022 NRL season | 1 | 0 | 0 | 0 | 0 | |
| 2022 | South Sydney Rabbitohs | 2022 NSW Cup season | 21 | 2 | 30 | 0 | 68 | |
| 2023 | South Sydney Rabbitohs | 2023 NRL season | 2 | 0 | 2 | 0 | 4 | |
| 2023 | South Sydney Rabbitohs | 2023 NSW Cup season | 22 | 6 | 61 | 0 | 146 | |
| 2024 | South Sydney Rabbitohs | 2024 NRL season | 8 | 1 | 8 | 0 | 20 | |
| 2024 | South Sydney Rabbitohs | 2024 NSW Cup season | 4 | 1 | 2 | 0 | 8 | |
| 2025 | Parramatta Eels | 2025 NRL season | 12 | 2 | 0 | 0 | 8 | |
| 2025 | Parramatta Eels | 2025 NSW Cup season | 7 | 6 | 4 | 0 | 32 | |
| 2026 | London Broncos | 2026 RFL Championship | 21 | 10 | 50 | 1 | 141 | |
| Club career total | | | 139 | 32 | 249 | 2 | 528 | |
