= Jye Gray =

Australian rugby league footballer

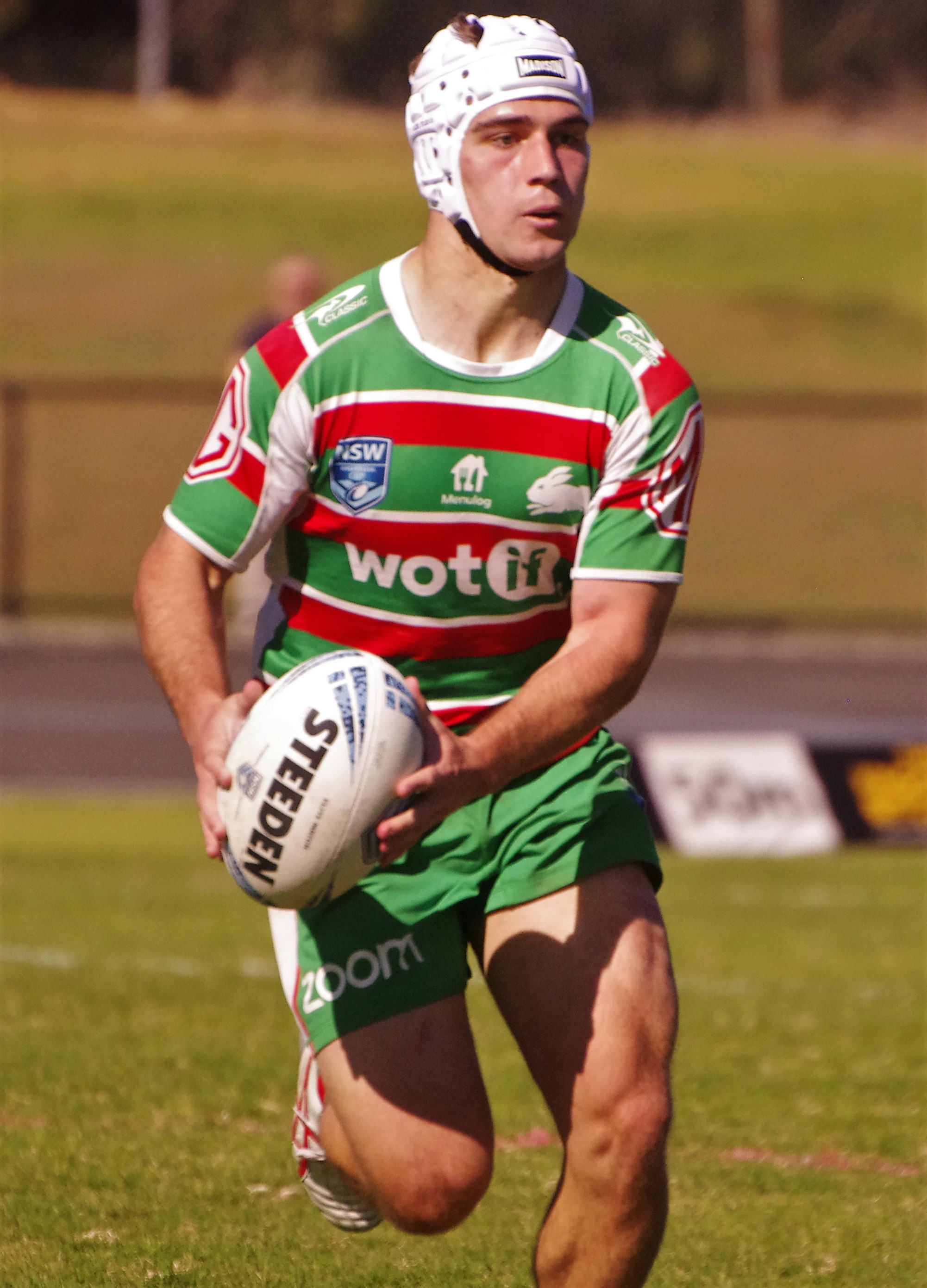

Personal information
- Full name: Jye Gray
- Born: 4 March 2004 (age 22) Liverpool, New South Wales, Australia
- Height: 170 cm (5 ft 7 in)
- Weight: 78 kg (12 st 4 lb)

Playing information
- Position: Fullback
Club
Years	Team	Pld	T	G	FG	P
2024–	South Sydney	48	17	0	0	68
Representative
Years	Team	Pld	T	G	FG	P
2025	Prime Minister's XIII	1	0	0	0	0
- Source: As of 16 November 2026

Jye Gray blue (born 4 March 2004) is an Australian professional rugby league footballer who plays as a fullback for the South Sydney Rabbitohs in the NRL.

== Background ==
Gray was born in Sydney, New South Wales and raised on the Gold Coast, Queensland.

He played his junior rugby league for the Parkwood Sharks and Runaway Bay Seagulls, and attended The Southport School where he was a diligent student, achieving an ATAR of 93 before being signed by the Brisbane Broncos despite being pursued by the Queensland Reds.

== Playing career ==
In 2021, Gray played for the Burleigh Bears in the Mal Meninga Cup and represented Queensland City under-17s, scoring twice in a 1–1 win over Queensland Country under-17s.

In 2022, Gray moved to the Souths Logan Magpies, scoring eight tries in eight games for their Mal Meninga Cup side. At the end of the season, he was named Mal Meninga Cup Player of the Year.

On 23 June 2022, he came off the bench for Queensland under-19s in their loss to New South Wales under-19s. On 28 June 2022, he signed with the South Sydney Rabbitohs on a two-year contract.

In 2023, Gray played for the Rabbitohs' SG Ball Cup and Jersey Flegg Cup sides.

=== 2024 ===
Gray began the season playing for South Sydney's New South Wales Cup side, moving from five-eighth to fullback.

In round 6 of the 2024 NRL season, Gray made his first grade debut, starting at fullback in South Sydney's 34–22 loss to the Cronulla-Sutherland Sharks. In round 9, Gray was taken from the field during the clubs 42-12 loss against Penrith. It was later revealed Gray had suffered a foot injury and would be ruled out for two months. In round 16, Gray crossed for his first try against the Manly Warringah Sea Eagles. In round 27, Gray scored two tries for South Sydney in their 36-28 loss against arch-rivals the Sydney Roosters.

=== 2025 ===
Gray started the 2025 NRL season as South Sydney's first choice fullback due to Latrell Mitchell being out injured. In the early rounds of the competition, Gray lead the Dally M leader board due to his good performances. Following the clubs round 15 loss to Canterbury, Gray was side lined with injury for an indefinite period. Gray played 19 games for South Sydney in the 2025 NRL season which saw the club finish 14th on the table. On 24 November 2025, the Rabbitohs announced that Gray had re-signed with the club until the end of 2029.

=== 2026 ===
Gray played 16 for South Sydney in the 2026 NRL season as the club finished 6th on the table and qualified for the finals.

== Statistics ==
Year	Team	Games	Tries	Pts
2024	South Sydney Rabbitohs	13	7	28
2025	South Sydney Rabbitohs	19	5	20
2026	South Sydney Rabbitohs	5	2	8
	Totals	37	14	56
