= Ben Marschke =

Australian rugby league footballer

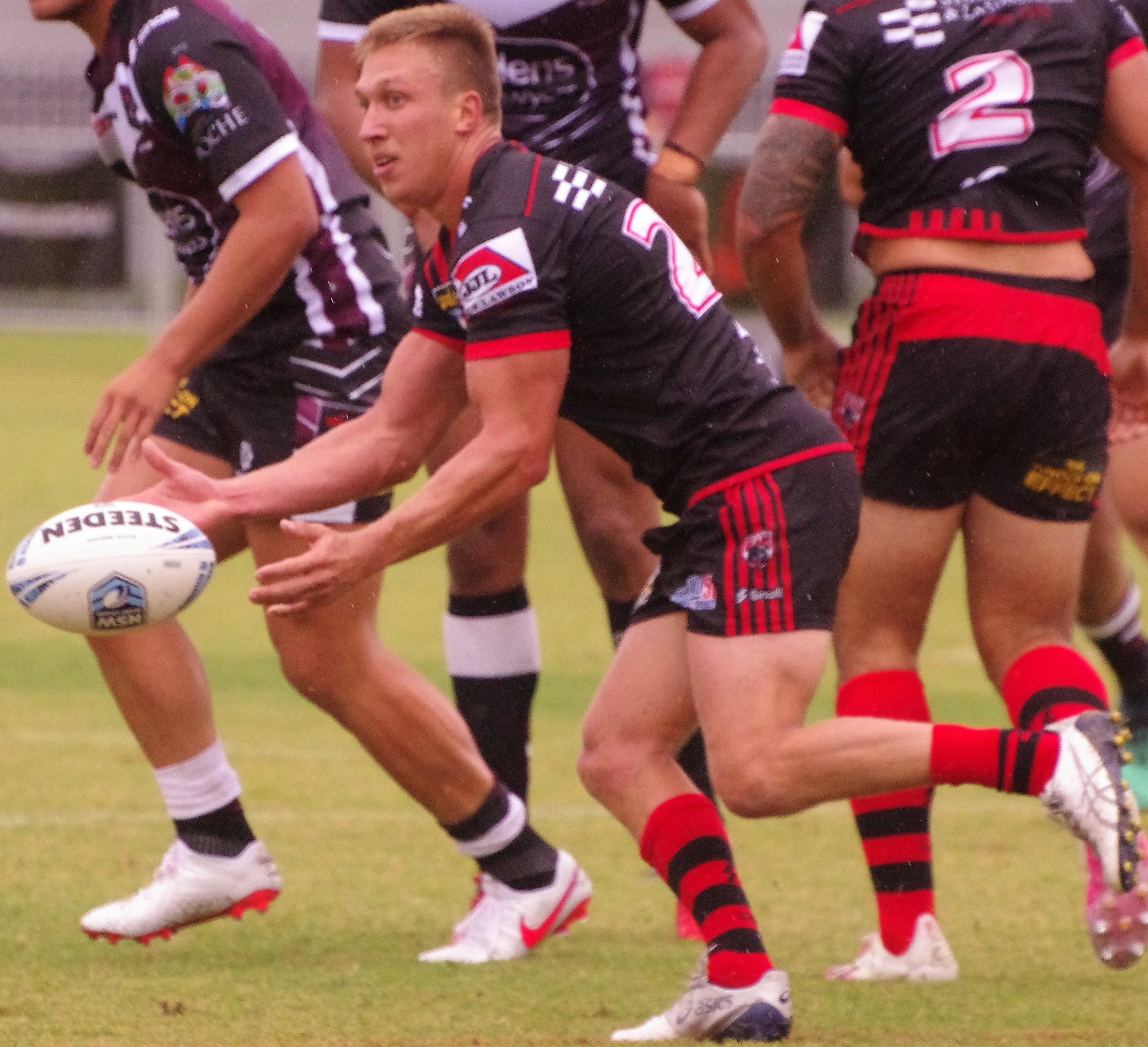

Personal information
- Full name: Benjamin Marschke
- Born: 19 June 1997 (age 28) Bundaberg, Queensland, Australia
- Height: 181 cm (5 ft 11 in)
- Weight: 95 kg (14 st 13 lb)

Playing information
- Position: Hooker
Club
Years	Team	Pld	T	G	FG	P
2021	Sydney Roosters	13	1	0	0	4
- Source: As of 4 June 2021
- Relatives: Jesse Marschke (brother)

Ben Marschke (/mɑːrʃkiː/ MARSH-key; born 19 June 1997) is an Australian professional rugby league footballer who last played as a hooker for the Sydney Roosters in the National Rugby League (NRL).

== Background ==
Marschke was born in Bundaberg, Queensland and played his junior rugby league for the Across The Waves Tigers and attended St Luke's Anglican School and Shalom College before being signed by the Sydney Roosters. Marschke is of Irish descent.

== Playing career ==
In 2013, Marschke played for the Central Crows in the Cyril Connell Cup. In 2014, he moved up to their Mal Meninga Cup side. In 2015, Marschke moved to Sydney, playing for the Roosters in the SG Ball Cup. In 2016 and 2017, Marschke played for the Roosters' under-20s team.

In 2018, Marschke played for the Penrith Panthers in the NSW Cup. In 2019, he played for the Canterbury-Bankstown Bulldogs NSW Cup side. In 2020, he played for the Bulldogs at the NRL Nines in Perth.

=== 2021 ===
In 2021, Marschke joined North Sydney, the Roosters' NSW Cup feeder club. In Round 4 of the 2021 NRL season, Marschke was called up to the Sydney Roosters first grade side, making his debut in their 32–12 win over the New Zealand Warriors.

=== 2022 ===
Marschke made no appearances for the Sydney Roosters in the 2022 NRL season. Marschke instead featured for the clubs NSW Cup team North Sydney playing 23 games throughout the year.

=== 2023 ===
Marschke spent the entire 2023 season playing for North Sydney in the NSW Cup. Marschke played in North Sydney's 22-18 NSW Cup grand final loss against South Sydney.

=== 2025 ===
On 11 February 2025, Marschke signed a contract to join Central Coast side the Kincumber Colts.
