= Tallis Duncan =

Malta international rugby league footballer

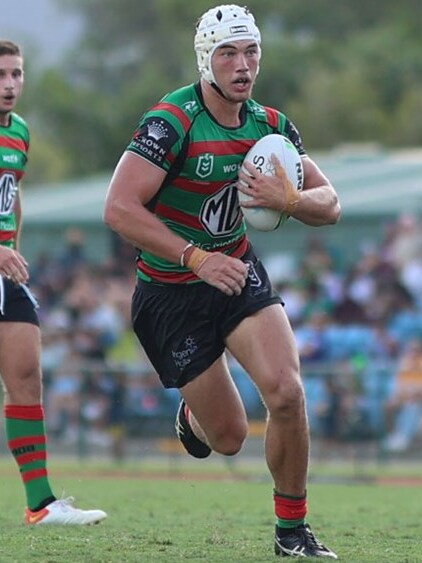

Personal information
- Full name: Tallis Duncan
- Born: 18 April 2002 (age 24) Wollongong, New South Wales, Australia
- Height: 186 cm (6 ft 1 in)
- Weight: 98 kg (15 st 6 lb)

Playing information
- Position: Second-row, Lock, Centre
Club
Years	Team	Pld	T	G	FG	P
2023–	South Sydney	73	24	0	0	96
Representative
Years	Team	Pld	T	G	FG	P
2022	Malta	1	0	0	0	0
2024–25	Prime Minister's XIII	2	1	0	0	4
- Source: As of 11 September 2026

Tallis Duncan (born 18 April 2002) is a Malta international rugby league footballer who plays as a second-row or lock forward for the South Sydney Rabbitohs in the National Rugby League.

He has also played for the Prime Minister's XIII at representative level.

== Background ==
Duncan was born in Wollongong, New South Wales. He was raised in Dungog, New South Wales and played junior rugby league for the Dungog Warriors. He played Harold Matthews Cup for the Newcastle Knights before moving to Sydney.

In Sydney, he played junior rugby league for Paddington Colts and Clovelly Crocodiles in the Eastern Suburbs District Junior Rugby League. Duncan went on to sign with the Sydney Roosters S.G. Ball side in the S.G. Ball Cup. He was named best forward for the 2019 season. After the 2020 season was called off due to COVID-19 Duncan went on to sign with the South Sydney Rabbitohs for the 2021 season.

He is of Indigenous Australian descent and Maltese descent.

== Playing career ==
In 2021, Duncan joined the South Sydney Rabbitohs. He was named in the Rabbitohs side for the 2022 NRL Trials. He made his debut against the North Queensland Cowboys, with the Rabbitohs losing 24–12. Duncan was sent to the sin bin in the 62nd minute of the game, and was later charged with a grade 1 dangerous tackle. Duncan was named in the Malta international side and represented them on 22 June against the Lebanon national rugby league team.

Duncan played the remainder of the 2022 season as a member of the South Sydney NSW Cup side. Duncan was named the Player of the Year and Player's Player for the 2022 Jersey Flegg Cup season.

=== 2023 ===
Duncan made his first grade debut from the bench in his side's 33–26 loss to the Canberra Raiders at Stadium Australia in round 13 of the 2023 NRL season. In round 19 of the 2023 NRL season, Duncan scored his first try in the top grade as South Sydney lost 36-32 against the Canterbury-Bankstown Bulldogs. On 24 September 2023, Duncan played for South Sydney in their 2023 NSW Cup grand final victory over North Sydney. He went on to be named South Sydney's NSW Cup player of the year.

=== 2024 ===
Duncan played 20 games for South Sydney in the 2024 NRL season as the club finished second last on the table after a difficult campaign.

=== 2025 ===
On 7 February, South Sydney announced that Duncan had re-signed with the club until the end of 2027. Duncan played every match for South Sydney in the 2025 NRL season which saw the club finish 14th on the table.

=== 2026 ===
In round 8 of the 2026 NRL season, Duncan scored a hat-trick in South Sydney's 48-6 victory over Melbourne. On 30 September 2026, the Rabbitohs announced that Duncan had re-signed with the club until the end of 2030. Duncan played 22 games for South Sydney in the 2026 NRL season as the club finished 6th on the table and qualified for the finals. Duncan played in South Sydney's upset elimination final loss to Newcastle.

== Statistics ==
Year	Team	Games	Tries	Pts
2023	South Sydney Rabbitohs	7	1	4
2024	South Sydney Rabbitohs	20	2	8
2025	South Sydney Rabbitohs	24	9	36
2026	South Sydney Rabbitohs	22	12	48
2027	South Sydney Rabbitohs			
	Totals	73	24	96
