= Tyrone Munro =

Australian rugby league player

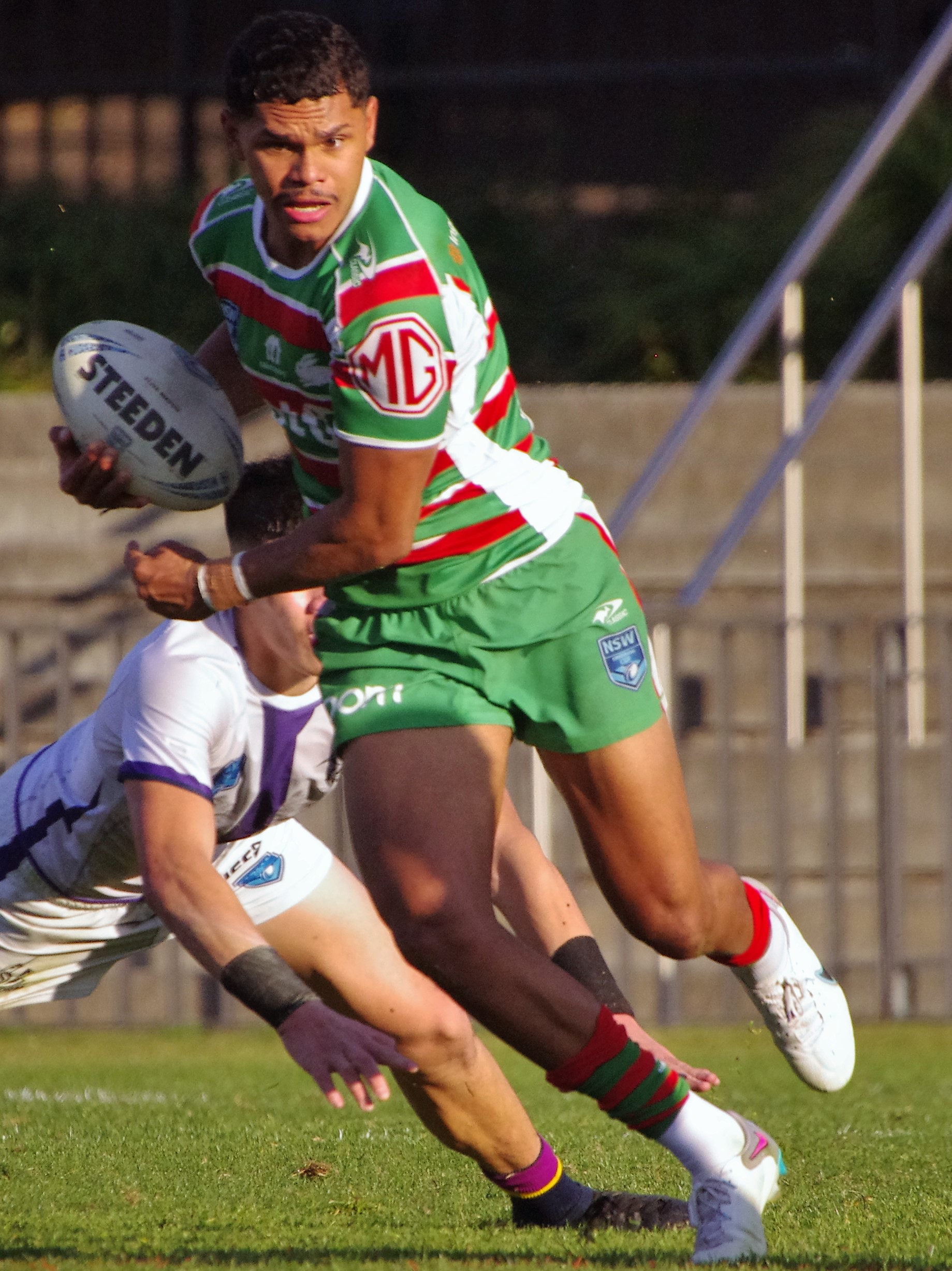

Personal information
- Full name: Tyrone Munro
- Born: 26 December 2004 (age 21) Moree, New South Wales, Australia
- Height: 187 cm (6 ft 2 in)
- Weight: 85 kg (13 st 5 lb)

Playing information
- Position: Wing
Club
Years	Team	Pld	T	G	FG	P
2023–	South Sydney	19	13	0	0	52
- Education: Alexandria Park Community School; Endeavour Sports High School
- Relatives: Josh Addo-Carr (cousin)

Tyrone Munro (born 26 December 2004), nicknamed Ty Ty, is an Australian professional rugby league player who plays as a winger for the South Sydney Rabbitohs in the National Rugby League.

== Early life and family ==
Munro was born in Moree, New South Wales and grew up in the Sydney suburb of Glebe.

He is of Indigenous Australian descent from the Gamilaraay people. He is the cousin of Parramatta Eels winger Josh Addo-Carr.

Munro attended Alexandria Park Community School for his high school education and captained the NSW Combined High Schools Rugby League team while attending Endeavour Sports High School.

== Playing career ==
=== Early career ===
While playing for the South Sydney Rabbitohs in the Harold Matthews Cup, Munro won the Player of the Year award in 2021 and was also a proficient player for the South Sydney Rabbitohs in the Jersey Flegg Cup. At the NSW Cup level, Munro achieved two try assists, four line-breaks, 156 average run metres and 10 tackle breaks in his only 3 games. On 28 June 2023, Munro signed a three-year contract extension with the Rabbitohs until the end of the 2025 NRL season.

=== NRL career ===
==== 2023 NRL Premiership season ====
Munro made three appearances in the 2023 NRL season for the South Sydney Rabbitohs and scored three tries in his three games.

Munro made his NRL debut against the New Zealand Warriors in round 18 of the 2023 NRL season. At Mount Smart Stadium in Auckland, New Zealand he was in the starting line-up for the South Sydney Rabbitohs, scoring his first NRL try. South Sydney Rabbitohs won this game 28-6.

In his second game against the Canterbury-Bankstown Bulldogs at Stadium Australia in round 19 of the 2023 NRL season on 8 July, Munro was selected in the South Sydney starting line-up. In this game, he scored tries in the 18th and 76th minute and ran a line-break in the 18th, 73rd and the 77th minute. The result for this game was the Bulldogs winning, 36-32.

In Munro's third and last game for South Sydney in the 2023 NRL season, he played against the Cronulla-Sutherland Sharks at Optus Stadium. This was in round 23 on 5 August. The final score for this match was 26-16, Cronulla's way.

Munro was selected in fourth game against the St. George Illawarra Dragons, but he was selected as the 18th man and he didn't get a chance to play.

==== 2024 NRL Premiership season ====
His first match for the Rabbitohs in 2024 NRL season occurred in Round 6 against the Cronulla-Sutherland Sharks at Stadium Australia, Sydney. He was selected to start this match. Munro only managed to play the first 19 minutes of the game before reaggravating a collarbone/shoulder injury that kept him out for the previous 5 matches of the 2024 season. Souths lost this game 22-34.

Tyrone Munro's first NRL game after recovering from his collarbone injury was against the Newcastle Knights at Stadium Australia, Sydney on 24 August. This game occurred in Round 24 of the 2024 NRL season. Munro was named in the starting line-up for this game. The final result for this match was the Newcastle Knights winning 16-36.

In Round 26, the South Sydney Rabbitohs played against the Penrith Panthers at Penrith Stadium, Sydney on the 20th of August. Tyrone Munro was named the starting winger in this game. His scored two tries in this match, being in the 33rd and the 53rd minutes of this game, including one full field intercept try. This was his second NRL career double. The final result for this game was the Rabbitohs losing, 34 to 12. Munro's performance on the night received high praise as just two days before the game his mum had died, while his uncle also died on the morning of the game.

=== 2025 NRL season ===
On 18 February, South Sydney announced that Munro had re-signed with the club until the end of 2027. Munro would be ruled out for six weeks after he fractured his collarbone for a third time in round one. Munro played 12 matches for South Sydney in the 2025 NRL season which saw the club finish 14th on the table.

=== 2026 NRL season ===
Tyrone Munro will miss the start of the 2026 premiership season due to his domestic violence court case not being held until April

=== Playing career outside NRL ===
==== 2023 ====
On 24 September 2023, Munro played for South Sydney Rabbitohs in their 2023 NSW Cup grand final victory over the North Sydney Bears. Munro scored the winning try for Souths with less than five minutes remaining.

On 1 October 2023, in the NRL State Championship, the Rabbitohs were playing the Brisbane Tigers at Stadium Australia, Sydney. The final result was the Bunnies winning 42-22. In this match, Tyrone Munro scored a hattrick, by scoring tries in the 10th, 37th and the 55th minutes. Because of this performance, he won the player of the match.

Tyrone Munro's first match after recovering from his collarbone injury was against the Western Suburbs Magpies in Round 24 of the 2024 NSW Cup season on the 17th of August. This match occurred in at Campbelltown Sports Stadium, Sydney. In this game, Munro scored tries in the 17th and 57th minute and achieved a line-break in the 57th.The Rabbitohs won this game 14-28.

== Statistics ==
Year	Team	Games	Tries	Pts
2023	South Sydney Rabbitohs	3	3	12
2024	South Sydney Rabbitohs	4	3	12
2025	South Sydney Rabbitohs	8	5	20
	Totals	15	11	44

== Controversy ==
On 14 October 2025, it was revealed that Munro had been charged by NSW Police with domestic violence-related offences. Munro was granted conditional bail to appear in Burwood Local Court on 30 October 2025.
