= Matthew French (rugby league) =

Australian rugby league footballer

Personal information
- Full name: Matthew French
- Born: 16 November 1999 (age 26) Gosford, New South Wales, Australia
- Height: 178 cm (5 ft 10 in)
- Weight: 94 kg (14 st 11 lb)

Playing information
- Position: Lock
Club
Years	Team	Pld	T	G	FG	P
2024–	South Sydney	1	0	0	0	0
- Source: As of 22 July 2025

Matthew French (born 16 November 1999) is an Australian professional rugby league footballer who plays as a lock forward for the South Sydney Rabbitohs in the National Rugby League (NRL).

== Early life ==
French grew up on the Central Coast of New South Wales. He played junior rugby league with The Entrance Tigers before progressing through North Sydney’s junior representative system.

== Playing career ==
=== NSW Cup and junior grades ===
French featured for North Sydney in the Jersey Flegg Cup in 2018, before joining South Sydney's Jersey Flegg side in 2019, where he was part of the premiership-winning team. He made his NSW Cup debut for South Sydney in Round 1 of the 2021 season against Penrith.

=== NRL debut ===
French made his NRL debut in Round 10 of the 2024 season, coming off the interchange bench in a 28–14 loss to St George Illawarra at Jubilee Oval. As of July 2025, that remains his sole first-grade appearance.
