= Jesse Marschke =

Australian rugby league footballer

Personal information
- Born: 19 June 1997 (age 29) Bundaberg, Queensland, Australia
- Height: 183 cm (6 ft 0 in)
- Weight: 90 kg (198 lb; 14 st 2 lb)

Playing information
- Position: Hooker, Five-eighth, Halfback
Club
Years	Team	Pld	T	G	FG	P
2024	St. George Illawarra	6	0	0	0	0
- Relatives: Ben Marschke (brother)

Jesse Marschke (/mɑːrʃkiː/ MARSH-key; born 19 June 1997) is an Australian professional rugby league footballer who played as a halfback and five-eighth for the St. George Illawarra Dragons in the National Rugby League (NRL). He is the brother of former Sydney Roosters player Ben Marschke.

== Career ==
In round 3 2024, Marschke made his NRL debut, starting at hooker, against the North Queensland Cowboys at Kogarah Oval in a 46−24 loss, in Round 13 he started at halfback in the upset 22-10 victory coming up against the reigning premiers the Penrith Panthers, and providing two vital try assists to get the win. On 23 November 2024, Marschke re-signed with North Sydney in the NSW Cup.
