= Dion Teaupa =

Tonga international rugby league footballer

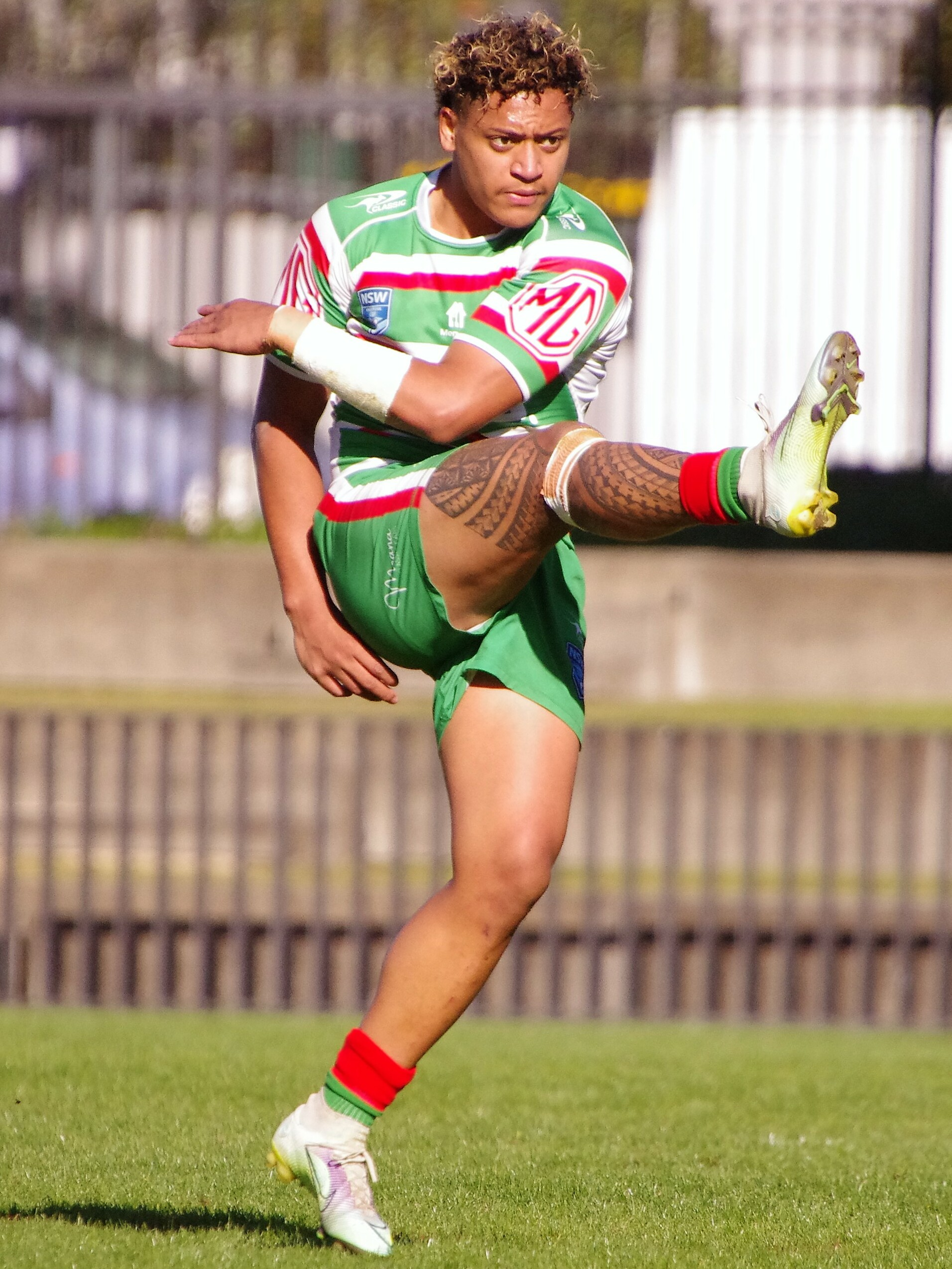

Personal information
- Full name: Dion Teaupa
- Born: 9 March 2002 (age 23) Liverpool, New South Wales, Australia

Playing information
- Position: Five-eighth, Halfback
Club
Years	Team	Pld	T	G	FG	P
2024	South Sydney	4	1	1	0	6
Representative
Years	Team	Pld	T	G	FG	P
2023–	Tonga	2	0	0	0	0
- Source: As of 7 September 2025

Dion Teaupa is a Tonga international rugby league footballer who plays as a five-eighth for the Gold Coast Titans in the NRL.

== Playing career ==
Teaupa made his first grade debut for South Sydney in round 10 of the 2024 NRL season against St. George Illawarra at Kogarah Oval. The following week, he was sent to the sin bin for a high tackle during South Sydney's 28-22 loss against North Queensland. On 8 September, it was announced that Teaupa would be departing the South Sydney club after not being offered a new contract.

=== 2025 ===
Dion has signed a train and trial deal with the Gold Coast Titans for season 2026.
