= History of the South Sydney Rabbitohs =

The history of the South Sydney Rabbitohs rugby league football club stretches back to the pre-schism (1908) days of rugby football in Australia to the present. The club's history is one of the longest of any Australian rugby league club and they are one of the National Rugby League's last two extant foundation clubs along with the Sydney Roosters.

== Early years ==
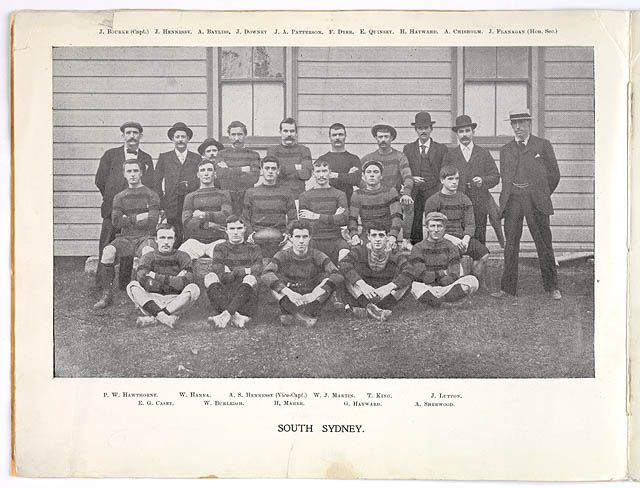
The South Sydney rugby union team of 1902 which included Arthur Hennessy, South Sydney rugby league club's first captain and coach. The rugby union club sported the original famous red and green colours.

South Sydney was the third rugby league football club founded in Australia after Glebe and Newtown. In 1908 a rugby league competition began in Sydney with working-class clubs, including the South Sydney Rugby Union Club, leaving rugby union to play by the new rules adopted by the New South Wales Rugby League. The South Sydney District Rugby League Football Club was founded on Friday 17 January 1908 at Redfern Town Hall when J J Giltinan was joined on the podium by cricketer Victor Trumper and politician Henry Clement Hoyle before a large crowd of supporters.

Souths took part in the first game of the inaugural competition when it started on Easter Monday, 20 April 1908. They defeated North Sydney 11–7 at Birchgrove Oval. Souths won the inaugural Sydney premiership beating Eastern Suburbs 14–12 in the final and backed it up the following year in extraordinary circumstances when opponents Balmain refused to show up in protest of the final being played as a prelude to a Kangaroos v Wallabies match. South Sydney kicked off to no one and were declared premiers.

During these early years Arthur Hennessy was considered the founding father of the South Sydney Rabbitohs, and he was assisted in administration by S. G. Ball. A hooker and prop forward, Hennessy was Souths' first captain and coach. He was also New South Wales' first captain and Australia's first test captain in 1908. He played 26 games for Souths between 1908 and 1911. South Sydney played in the grand final of the 1910 NSWRFL season, drawing with Newtown who were named premiers by virtue of being the League leaders.

South Sydney's playing jerseys sported cardinal red and myrtle green colours. Some sources have suggested that this combination of colours was due to the local rugby union club being nicknamed the "Redfern Waratahs". The suburb is named after surgeon William Redfern, who was granted 100 acres (0.40 km2) of land in this area in 1817 by Lachlan Macquarie. Red and green dominate the colours of the waratah and hence, possibly, the South Sydney Rugby League Football Club adopted these colours for their jerseys. Prior to the establishment of the rugby league club in 1908, the earlier South Sydney rugby union club (which included Arthur Hennessy, South Sydney Rugby League club's first captain and coach), originally sported the famous red and green colours.

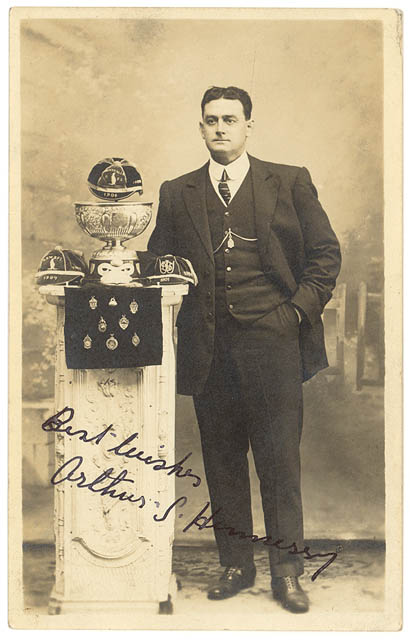
Arthur Hennessy, South Sydney's first captain and coach.

The most famous story of how the club got the "Rabbitohs" nickname comes from their rugby union days at the turn of the 20th century. During that period, players wearing their cardinal red and myrtle green football jumpers, earned some extra money on Saturday mornings by hawking rabbits around the district with the traditional cry of "Rabbitoh!" echoing through the narrow streets. As they made a sale, they would sling the bunny from their shoulder and skin it on the spot, inevitably accumulating some of the fur and blood on their jerseys as they did so. When they played in those blood stained jumpers that afternoon, opponents from wealthier rugby clubs did not always appreciate the aroma and would mockingly repeat the "Rabbitoh!" cry.

After further premierships in 1914 and 1918, Souths enjoyed the first of three golden premiership eras they would enjoy winning seven out of eight premierships from 1925–32, only missing out in 1930 where Wests broke through for their maiden premiership. Star players in Souths first golden era included five-eighth Alf "Smacker" Blair, Eddie Root, try scoring wing, Benny Wearing (144 career tries), Alf O'Connor and second-row, George Treweek.

In 1925 Souths won 15 games straight to go through the first grade season undefeated. The 1925 team is still the only Souths team to go through the first grade season undefeated.

Such was Souths' dominance in the early years of the rugby league competition that the Rabbitohs were labelled "The Pride of the League".

Premiership success evaded Souths between 1933-49 despite being runners up on four occasions before a new breed of Rabbitohs would make their mark on the game.

In 1948 Souths began playing their home games at Redfern Oval. Their first match there was a 19-all draw with Easts.

== The 1950s golden era ==
After missing the semi-finals for the previous four years, the Rabbitohs finished on top of the ladder at the end of the regular home and away season in 1949 ahead of Wests, St George and Balmain. However, they were beaten by St George twice: 16–12 in the first semi, then 19–12 in the grand final. In a rough game the Dragons had scored five tries to two. What followed, however. was a run where they won five of the next six titles. Souths' twelfth premiership, their first in almost two decades, came in 1950, when they again finished as minor premiers. They disposed of Newtown 30–4 before beating Wests 21–15 in the final.

1951 was a remarkable year as Souths finished the regular season 11 points clear of nearest rivals Manly, whom they dispatched in a devastating display 42–14 in the premiership decider. The 42 points remains the highest score by a team in a grand final.

Souths were beaten in 1952 in a very controversial final against Western Suburbs 22-12 where Souths had a fair try disallowed. It was Wests' fourth and final premiership. Leading the charge for Souths was captain Jack Rayner, whose side included Denis Donoghue, Les 'Chicka' Cowie, Johnny Graves, winger Ian Moir, Greg Hawick, Ernie Hammerton, goal-kicking forward Bernie Purcell and the great Clive Churchill.

In 1953, the Rabbitohs were once again minor premiers and narrowly beat Norths 5–4 in the first semi before a resounding victory over St George 31–12, with Churchill dominating the game. 1953 saw Newtown finish top of the ladder but they were beaten by Souths in the grand final 23–15.

The story of what Souths achieved in the season of 1955 is among the most famous in Australian sport. "The miracle of '55" was an epic fight in which the Rabbitohs won 11 virtual sudden-death matches in a row to steal the premiership. After the first match of the second round they had been equal second last on the ladder. In their incredible run home they came from behind in no less than five matches to win and earn themselves fourth spot and a place in the semi-finals. Mid season, stars Greg Hawick and Clive Churchill were injured and played no further part in the season. They beat Manly 14–12 in a desperate semi-final. They were down 14–11 in the final against St. George when in the dying minutes a try by winger Ian Moir and a pressure goal kicked by Bernie Purcell got them home.

The grand final against Newtown was a fitting finale after such a season. Newtown led 11–7 with six minutes to go. But the never-say-die Souths scrambled a try to halfback, Col Donohoe and converted it through Purcell to complete the fairytale with a 12–11 last gasp victory.

1956 was the beginning of the Dragons premiership era (finished 1966)– Souths finished third on the ladder but their season came to an end one match short of the Grand Final with a loss to Balmain 36–33. The pattern continued in 1957 as they finished third again and finished their season in the final, this time losing to Manly 15–11. After this they missed the semis for almost a decade.

== "The Little Master" ==
The heart and soul of the Rabbitohs in the 1950s was undoubtedly Clive Churchill. "The Little Master", as he was nicknamed by admirers, was a fullback and is regarded by many as the greatest Australian Rugby League player. Originally hailing from Newcastle, he was signed by Souths as a youngster and he would be a central figure in two of Souths' golden eras.

Rabbitoh altered the traditional tactical approach to the fullback position during his playing era. Despite his smaller physical stature, he is recognized as one of the most influential players in the history of the sport.

Churchill also captained Australia in a record 24 Test matches but strangely didn't captain Souths to a premiership. Churchill played 34 Tests for Australia and the 1954 World Cup series. For six years he was Australia's captain, including three series against Great Britain. Churchill played his final test for Australia on the 1956-57 Kangaroo Tour. He finished playing with South Sydney after being captain-coach for the 1958 season.

After being the main player in Souths' golden run between 1950–55, Churchill was back as coach in 1967 to help end the dominance of St. George and steer the Rabbitohs to their final four premierships.

He died of cancer in 1985 aged 58. In his memory, a stand at the Sydney Cricket Ground, a place where he achieved many of his finest feats and acts of courage for South Sydney and Australia, was named after him. On grand final day, the best performed player in the grand final is awarded the prestigious "Clive Churchill Medal".

== The 1960s and 1970s glory years ==
After their second golden era ended in 1955, the club had to wait a decade before making another premiership decider in 1965, and premiership in 1967. The remarkable St. George era of 11 consecutive premierships was sandwiched in between two special periods in the history of South Sydney. Churchill came back to coach the Rabbitohs and built a premiership team around a tough pack of forwards including Ron Coote (who is regarded as Australia's second best ever lock, after Johnny Raper), Bob McCarthy (who scored over 100 first grade tries), Gary Stevens, Bob Moses, John O'Neill, Jim Morgan, Elwyn Walters and inspirational captain John Sattler.

In February 1966 at Redfern Oval a record crowd of 18,701 saw Souths defeat premiers St George.

Souths would win four of the next five premierships between 1967 and 1971. In the 1967 grand final Souths beat Canterbury 12-10 following a spectacular intercept try by second row forward Bob McCarthy. In 1968 Souths defeated Manly 13-9 featuring a solo length of the field try by winger Mike Cleary. Souths lost the 1969 grand final 11–2 to Balmain who devised a controversial plan of "go slow" tactics in order to successfully disrupt Souths play. Souths convincingly beat Manly in the 1970 grand final with halfback Bob Grant starring with two tries. Souths' last grand final victory in 1971 saw them beat back a determined comeback by St. George in the second half to take out the game 16–10. This was their last grand final for 43 years ago. During this golden era Souths' backline also had plenty of class, including goal kicking legend Eric Simms, dual rugby internationals Michael Cleary and Jimmy Lisle, Paul Sait, Bob Honan, Brian James, brothers Ray and Arthur Branighan, Dennis Pittard and Bob Grant. Of the 1970 grand final side that beat Manly 23–12, only Arthur Branighan did not achieve International status. Souths was also a team of plenty of courage, highlighted by captain John Sattler in the 1970 grand final who in the early minutes was "king-hit" late and unexpectedly by Manly prop John Bucknall. The hit broke Sattler's jaw but he continued to play on for the full match and to lead by example.

Goal-kicking fullback Eric Simms broke many point-scoring records during this period, scoring a total of 1,841 first grade points (23 tries, 803 goals, 86 field goals) for the club by the end of his career. In 1969 Simms broke the record for the most points scored in a premiership season with 265, previously held by Dave Brown of Eastern Suburbs. Simms was such a great exponent of kicking field goals (including five in one game against Penrith in 1969) that in season 1971 the game's authorities eventually reduced the value of the field goal from two points to one.

International five-eighth Denis Pittard won the coveted Rothmans Medal twice, in 1969 and 1971.

In 1975 Souths fielded eight international players, a club record: Bob Grant, Bob Honan, Bernie Lowther, Bob McCarthy, John O'Neill, Paul Sait, Eric Simms and Gary Stevens.

== Hard times and 1980s revival ==
Financial problems started to hit Souths and key players from their grand final sides of the early '70s headed to either Manly (John O'Neill, Ray Branighan, Bob Moses) or Easts (Ron Coote, Michael Cleary, Elwyn Walters). Souths Leagues Club's doors were closed in 1973 but a 'Save Our Souths' campaign ensured the Rabbitohs survived.

Things began to turn around in 1978 when under new coach Jack Gibson, Souths won the pre-season competition (10-3 over Canterbury) and finished the season second in the club championship.

Souths' star player in the late '70s was the powerful Australian representative winger Terry Fahey, affectionately known to fans as the 'Redfern Express'. Utility back Robert 'Rocky' Laurie won the prestigious 'Dally M' award in 1980.

On 13 June 1982 at a Special General Meeting the South Sydney Club was incorporated as a company limited by guarantee.

Souths' only trophies in the 1980s were the win over Cronulla-Sutherland in the final of the mid-week 1981 Tooth Cup competition and victory in the pre-season 'Sevens' competition in 1988. In the premiership Souths made the semi-finals in 1980, 1984, 1986, 1987 and 1989, a year in which they were runaway minor premiers and also took out the Club Championship.

1980 saw the Rabbitohs make the semis for the first time in a few years, finishing fifth, but were promptly knocked out of the finals series by St George 16–5. Ron Willey became coach in 1984, and the next year Souths made the semis. Souths came from 0–14 behind to beat Manly 22–18 in a memorable first semi-final but were knocked out the following week by St. George, but their best two years were 1986 and 1989 under the leadership of Mario Fenech. The Rabbitohs just missed out on the minor premiership in 1986 and then were bundled out after losing both semi-finals to Canterbury and Balmain respectively.

Souths led from basically start to finish in 1989, remarkably not losing a single match away from the Sydney Football Stadium. Souths finished the regular season on 37 points with 18 wins and a draw, losing only three games along the way. However, come finals time, they lost a classic semi-final to Balmain and Canberra a week later powered home to end Souths best chance of getting back to the glory years.

Apart from hooker and captain Fenech, Souths' stars during this period included forwards Les and Ian Roberts, halfback Craig Coleman and mercurial five-eighth Phil Blake.

== The troubled 1990s and exclusion ==
More troubles hit Souths in the 1990s where they went from minor premiers in 1989 to wooden spooners in 1990. Led by George Piggins, Souths survived in the competition but much of the time were at the bottom of the ladder. They did however take out the pre-season competition in 1994, defeating two-time premiers Brisbane 27–26 in the final.

In 1996 Souths were thrashed 62-0 by arch-rivals Sydney Roosters on ANZAC Day. That year Souths would play their last ever first-grade match at Redfern, beating the South Queensland Crushers 48–16.

Lack of funds saw Souths unable to keep their top players (including captain Mario Fenech, Les Davidson, Mark Carroll and Craig Field) and a lot of talented young juniors were lost and went on to represent Australia from other clubs (these included Jim Dymock, Ian Roberts, Jim Serdaris, Terry Hill and later Craig Wing and Braith Anasta when the club was excluded from the competition).

The Super League war was triggered by a vision to cut Sydney sides, with Souths in the firing line. Souths remained in the ARL during the 1997 season, and then played in the National Rugby League, the merger of the Super League and ARL, from its first season in 1998. The NRL was determined to cut its competition to 14 teams and duly cut South Sydney from the premiership for the 2000 season.

== Fightback and readmission ==
Souths fought their way back through the courtrooms and public rallies, generating a swell of support throughout Sydney and Australia. As they took on the NRL and News Limited. Souths won readmission on appeal during the 2001 season and were brought back into the NRL competition for the 2002 season.

== The comeback, 2002–04 seasons ==
After being ousted from the NRL league competition in 1999, the Rabbitohs were granted readmission in 2002 after court action led by Sydney solicitor Nick Pappas. Shortly after the reinstatement, Pappas succeeded George Piggins as chairman of the club.

Not surprisingly, after having to create an entirely new team for the season, the Rabbitohs were not at their former best and performed disappointingly during their return season. They did however manage to notch up wins over various clubs, including two over Canberra. 2003 saw the team finish as wooden spooners, but they did acquire various new players, including Bryan Fletcher, Ashley Harrison, Justin Smith, Luke MacDougall and Mark Minichello.

2004 was another less-than-successful campaign on the field. Off the field, however, the league world was shocked by the announcement that Penrith CEO Shane Richardson would be quitting his post there to join the Rabbitohs. Richardson had previously led the Penrith Panthers football club to their second ever Premiership in 2003 against the Sydney Roosters. At the time Richardson said words to the effect of "bringing this club back to its previous success will be the challenge of my life. It will be tough, but I expect this club to be competing in the NRL finals in 2008"

== 2007 season ==
The Rabbitohs announced a series of big-name player signings for season 2007 including Roy Asotasi and Daniel Irvine (prop and hooker from the Bulldogs), David Kidwell (back row forward from Melbourne), Nigel Vagana (centre from Cronulla), Dean Widders (utility forward from Parramatta) and Jeremy Smith (half-back from Parramatta). Of these, Roy Asotasi was extremely popular with fans as he is currently considered by many as one of the top three prop forwards in the game. As a result of this recruitment, Souths were able to field the most internationals (eight) in a game since 1975: Kiwis Nigel Vagana, David Kidwell, Roy Asotasi, Joe Galuvao and David Fa'alogo and Kangaroos David Peachey and Shannon Hegarty.

Off-field the club had secured Jason Taylor (former Parramatta coach who became assistant coach at Souths), Mark Hughes (former Head of Recruitment at the Bulldogs), Errol Alcott (formerly Australian cricket team's head physiotherapist), Anthony Mundine (appointed as Indigenous Liaison Officer) and former NZ cricket captain Martin Crowe (as a board member).

Markedly improved results were shown on the field, with South Sydney winning their first three games of the 2007 season (marking their best start to a season since 1972) and being competitive in every game. On the back of one of the best defences in the competition, the Rabbitohs finished strongly, making the semi-finals for the first time since 1989. They finished the season in 7th position with 12 wins. Souths' season ended in the first week of the finals, losing 30–6 to the Manly-Warringah Sea Eagles (who they had beaten in a regular season match only a few weeks before, prompting hope among the Rabbitohs faithful that a repeat victory and a serious finals campaign was possible) at Brookvale Oval.

== 2008 season ==
The South Sydney Rabbitohs celebrated their centenary year during the 2008 National Rugby League season. The club fielded teams in the National Rugby League Telstra Premiership and the Toyota Cup National Youth Competition.

The Rabbitohs also began an affiliation with the New South Wales Premier League competition (the North Sydney Bears) and the Super League (Leeds Rhinos, the reigning Super League champions).

On 26 January 2008, the Rabbitohs played the Leeds Rhinos at the Hodges Stadium at University of North Florida in Jacksonville, Florida, the first time first-grade professional rugby league teams from Australia and England played each other in the United States. A crowd of about 12,000 attended with Russell Crowe, Greg Norman, and the stars of television show American Chopper among the audience. Leeds Rhinos won the game 26-24 (after having been behind 26–0 at half-time South Sydney staged an unlikely comeback that fell agonisingly short).

== 2009 season ==
In the 2009 season, Souths finished 10th on the table missing the finals. On 17 September 2009 it was announced that Taylor had been sacked as coach by the club due to an altercation with second-rower David Fa'alogo during end-of-season celebrations. A visibly upset Taylor appeared on the NRL Footy Show later that evening and on a number of sport programs on Sydney radio in the following days to explain his conduct and subsequent dismay at his sacking.

== 2010s ==
=== 2011 ===
Following the sacking of Taylor, South Sydney appointed former premiership winning coach John Lang as replacement. Lang's two years in charge ended with the club narrowly missing the finals in 2010 and 2011. At the end of 2011, Lang retired from coaching and was replaced by Michael Maguire. In Maguire's first season at Souths, the club finished 3rd on the table, which was their best finish to a regular season since finishing as minor premiers in 1989. Souths reached the preliminary final but were defeat by Canterbury-Bankstown 32–8.

=== 2013 ===
In 2013, Souths finished 2nd on the table. Souths reached the preliminary final for a second year running and led Manly-Warringah 14–6 at half time before a second half capitulation ended in a 30–20 defeat.

=== 2014 ===
In 2014, South Sydney finished third on the table at the end of the regular season. They defeated Manly and arch rivals Eastern Suburbs in the preliminary final 32–22 to reach their first grand final in 43 years. The following week, South Sydney defeated Canterbury 30–6 in the 2014 grand final winning their first premiership in 43 years. The match is best remembered for the fractured cheekbone that Sam Burgess sustained in the first tackle of the match. Burgess stayed on the field for the entire match against the advice of the training staff who advised him to come off the field. A second half try to his brother George Burgess was another highlight as he bumped off several Canterbury players including Tony Williams to score. After the match, Sam Burgess was awarded the Clive Churchill Medal.

=== 2015 ===
In 2015, South Sydney won the preseason Auckland Nines competition and started the season off strongly before injuries and suspensions set in with the club finishing 7th on the table. Souths were eliminated in the opening week of the finals series against Cronulla-Sutherland ending their premiership defense.

=== 2016 & 2017 ===
In 2016 and 2017, Souths missed out on the finals after finishing 12th in both seasons. In September 2017, Maguire was terminated as coach of South Sydney despite having two years remaining on his contract.

=== 2018 ===
At the end of 2017, Anthony Seibold was appointed as the new South Sydney head coach. For the 2018 NRL season, many experts predicted Souths to finish outside the top 8 but the club performed strongly throughout the year finishing 3rd on the table at the end of the regular season. In week one of the finals, South Sydney played against Melbourne and looked to have secured the victory until a late try and a field goal gave Melbourne the win 29–28. In week two, South Sydney played against St George for the first time in the finals series since 1984. Souths won the match 13–12 thanks to three field goals from Adam Reynolds including one in the final minute of the match. In the preliminary final, Souths faced off against arch rivals Eastern Suburbs in what would also be the last match played at the Sydney Football Stadium. In front of a ground record crowd of 44,380, Souths were defeated 12–4. After the conclusion of the 2018 season, both Wayne Bennett and Seibold were rumored to be switching clubs for the 2019 season. In November 2018, Seibold angrily spoke to the media about a possible switch with Brisbane coach Wayne Bennett. He went on to say "I have had a gutful. I’ve been sitting here for four weeks and feeling like a punching bag. It's not acceptable and it's not fair ... He's (Wayne Bennett) been ringing up the Souths boys but then tells his press conference he hasn't spoken to anyone. That's absolute bullshit ... I'm sick of Wayne carrying on. On 2 December 2018, Seibold was announced as the new Brisbane Broncos coach from 2019 onwards a year earlier than expected after Wayne Bennett was sacked as coach. Bennett was then named as new South Sydney head coach.

=== 2019 ===
South Sydney started the 2019 NRL season strongly with the club winning 10 of their first 11 matches. Following the 2019 State of Origin series, Souths suffered a slump in form losing 4 games in a row. The club then recovered towards the end of the regular season winning 3 games in a row to finish in 3rd place on the table and qualified for the finals series.

South Sydney would go on to lose their qualifying final against their arch rivals the Sydney Roosters 30–6 in week one of the 2019 finals series at the Sydney Cricket Ground. In the elimination final against Manly-Warringah, Souths won a hard-fought match 34–26 at ANZ Stadium to reach their second consecutive preliminary final. In the preliminary final against Canberra, Souths would go on to fall short of a grand final appearance losing the match 16–10 at a sold out Canberra Stadium.

== 2020s ==
=== 2020 ===
South Sydney finished the 2020 NRL season in sixth place and qualified for the finals. Along the way, the club recorded big victories over Parramatta winning 38–0 and defeating arch-rivals the Sydney Roosters 60–8 which was Souths' biggest ever win over the club. Souths would then defeat Newcastle and Parramatta to reach the preliminary final against Penrith. In the preliminary final, Souths lost a close encounter 20–16 which ended their season. The result also meant it was the club's third straight preliminary final loss.

=== 2021 ===
South Sydney began the 2021 NRL season as one of the favourites to win the premiership. After losing to Melbourne in the opening round of the year, Souths went on to win the next seven games in a row. In the next three games however, the club suffered a 50–0 loss against Melbourne and a 56–12 loss against Penrith. In round 22, they set a new record in the competitions 113-year history being the first club to score 30 points or more in eight consecutive matches. Souths would go on to finish the regular season in third place after winning 13 of their last 14 matches. In week one of the finals series, South Sydney defeated Penrith 16–10 to book a place in the preliminary final for the fourth season in a row. In the preliminary final, the club defeated Manly 36–16 to reach the Grand Final for the first time since 2014 and only the second time since 1971. In the 2021 NRL Grand Final, South Sydney trailed Penrith 8–6 at the half-time break. In the second half, Souths player Cody Walker threw a long pass which was intercepted by Penrith's Stephen Crichton which saw the player score untouched under the posts. With five minutes remaining, South Sydney scored in the corner through Alex Johnston. South Sydney captain Adam Reynolds then had a conversion attempt from the sideline to make the game 14–14. Reynolds narrowly missed his attempt which went just wide of the post. In the final minute, Reynolds attempted a two-point field goal which fell short of the crossbar. Penrith would go on to win the match 14–12.

=== 2022 ===
Following the departure of coach Wayne Bennet and captain Adam Reynolds, Rabbitohs assistant coach Jason Demetriou and lock Cameron Murray were appointed as head coach and captain respectively. The 2022 season got off to a rough start for Souths, losing three of their first four games, including an upset loss to the Brisbane Broncos, and a golden point loss to the Melbourne Storm. However, Souths would finish the regular season strongly, winning seven of their last ten games, including a four game winning streak between rounds 16 and 19, and narrow losses to the Sharks and Panthers. The South Sydney club finished seventh with a win-loss record of 14–10.

In week one of the finals, Souths beat arch-rivals the Sydney Roosters 30–14 after losing to them the week prior. The game was notable for having seven sin bins (four of which were Souths players), setting a new record for the most sin bins in a single game. The following week, Souths beat the Cronulla-Sutherland Sharks in a one-sided match, winning 38-12, and advancing to a fifth consecutive preliminary final, where they would face the Penrith Panthers. After leading 12-0, Penrith scored five unanswered tries to win the game 32-12, ending South Sydney’s season.

== Souths Victory Song – Club Song ==
The Souths Victory Song (club song) is called Glory Glory to South Sydney and uses the tune of the Battle Hymn of the Republic. It was written sometime before the end of 1967, the exact date not being known. It was apparently played in the South Sydney Rugby League Club at Redfern and became popular. When Souths won the first ever televised grand final in 1967, it was recorded and played on a Sydney radio station and then on a late night TV show. It became so popular that a record was made of it and sold to the public.

The record was made using 15 musicians and four backup singers who were known as the Will Dower Sounds. Will Dower was the Leagues Club band leader. The arrangement was by Les Dempsey and the lead vocals by the Leagues Club's solo singer, Terry Holden. The record was officially known as South's Victory Song rather than the now more popular Glory Glory to South Sydney

Many tens of thousands of copies of the song were sold in the late 1960s, with the proceeds going to charity.

The song is still used in 2014 and is exactly the same original recording. It is believed that the song is the first specifically written club song for any Australian premier rugby league team.

The "Mounties" mentioned in the second verse are North Sydney. This nickname came about since they shared their colours (red and black) with the Royal Canadian Mounted Police (i.e. the Mounties).

== Supporters ==
Over its long history, the South Sydney club has attracted several high-profile fans, many of whom were involved in campaigning for their reinstatement in the NRL after their expulsion at the close of the Super League war. These include Andrew Denton, Ray Martin, Anthony Maroon, Don Lane and John Jarratt.
