= Luke Stuart =

Australian rugby league footballer

Personal information
- Born: 24 February 1977 (age 49) Sydney, New South Wales, Australia

Playing information
- Height: 188 cm (6 ft 2 in)
- Weight: 100 kg (15 st 10 lb)
- Position: Prop
Club
Years	Team	Pld	T	G	FG	P
1998–01	Cronulla Sharks	52	5	0	0	20
2002–11	South Sydney	190	6	0	0	24
	Total	242	11	0	0	44
Representative
Years	Team	Pld	T	G	FG	P
2009	City Origin	1	0	0	0	0

Luke Stuart (born 24 February 1977) is an Australian former professional rugby league footballer who played for the South Sydney Rabbitohs in the National Rugby League (NRL). He played as second-row. Stuart joined South Sydney when they re-entered the NRL competition in 2002.

== Background ==
Stuart was born in Sydney, New South Wales, Australia.

Stuart was a St John's Bosco junior, in the Sutherland Shire.

== Career ==
Stuart made his first grade debut in round 9 of the 1998 NRL season for Cronulla-Sutherland against the Auckland Warriors at Mt. Smart Stadium. In the 1999 NRL season, Stuart made six appearances as Cronulla won the Minor Premiership and were among the favorites to win the competition but were defeated by rivals St. George in the preliminary final at Stadium Australia. In the 2001 NRL season, Stuart played nearly every game for Cronulla as the club reached another preliminary final but were defeated by eventual premiers Newcastle at the Sydney Football Stadium.

In 2002, Stuart joined South Sydney and played in the club's first game after their readmission which came against arch rivals the Sydney Roosters. Souths were defeated 40–6 at the Sydney Football Stadium. In the following seasons, Souths continued to struggle on the field and finished last in 2003, 2004 and 2006.

He was instrumental in South Sydney's 2007 Finals charge by playing the majority of games, while playing at Second-Row and Prop. He was a regular starter and was occasionally used as an impact player, coming off the bench to bolster Souths' feared forward pack, including Roy Asotasi, John Sutton, David Fa'alogo and Peter Cusack. Souths would eventually reach the 2007 finals series which was the first time the club had reached the finals since 1989.

In 2008, he won the George Piggins Medal as the club's best and fairest player for the season.

He was selected for City in the City vs Country match on 8 May 2009. At 32 years and 73 days, the selection makes Stuart the oldest NRL player to make their representative debut, a record previously held by Scott Sattler.

He was seen as one of South Sydney's most consistent performers since their readmission in to the NRL in 2002 and was rewarded for all his efforts when he was named replacement captain for the injured Roy Asotasi for the last few games of the 2009 season.

Stuart's final game for South Sydney in the top grade came in round 5 of the 2011 NRL season against the Wests Tigers at the Sydney Football Stadium which finished in a 30–6 loss.
