= John Sutton (rugby league) =

Australian rugby league footballer

John "Sutto" Sutton
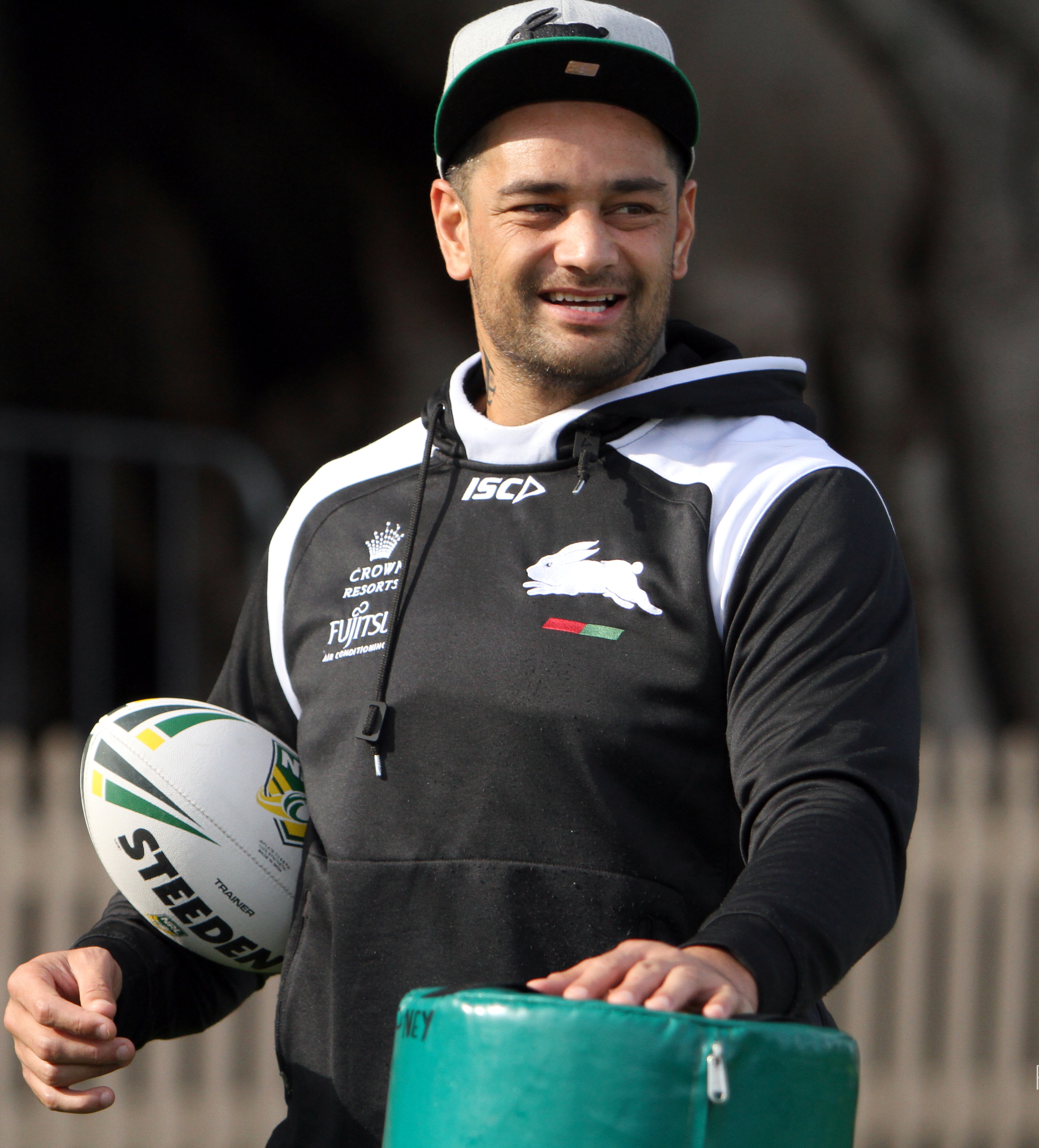

Personal information
- Full name: John Sutton
- Born: 5 November 1984 (age 42) Sydney, New South Wales, Australia

Playing information
- Height: 190 cm (6 ft 3 in)
- Weight: 105 kg (16 st 7 lb)
- Position: Five-eighth, Second-row
Club
Years	Team	Pld	T	G	FG	P
2004–19	South Sydney	336	61	7	1	259
Representative
Years	Team	Pld	T	G	FG	P
2005	Prime Minister's XIII	1	0	0	0	0
2008–09	NSW City	2	1	0	0	4

John Sutton (born 5 November 1984) is an Australian former professional rugby league footballer who played as a five-eighth and second-rower for the South Sydney Rabbitohs in the NRL.

Sutton played for NSW City Origin and the Prime Minister's XIII. He captained the Rabbitohs in their 2014 NRL Grand Final victory, and is the most capped player in South Sydney's history. Sutton currently works as a development coach for the Rabbitohs.

== Background ==
Sutton was born in Sydney, New South Wales, Australia and is of Fijian Rotuman descent.

Sutton played his junior football for Kensington United and the Coogee Randwick Wombats. Sutton attended Marcellin College, J J Cahill Memorial High School and South Sydney High School before being signed by the South Sydney Rabbitohs.

Sutton is a member of the Maroubra Bra Boys gang. He is the older brother of Joanna Sutton. Due to his Rotuman mother who comes from the village of Hapmafau, Itu’tiu, Rotuma, Sutton qualifies to play for the Fiji Bati.

== Playing career ==
=== 2004 ===
In Round 17, Sutton made his NRL debut for South Sydney against the Brisbane Broncos at centre and scored a try in the 48-28 loss at Suncorp Stadium. He finished his debut year with 10 matches and 2 tries as South Sydney finished last on the table.

=== 2005 ===
Sutton finished the 2005 NRL season with him playing in 19 matches, scoring 5 tries, kicking 7 goals and kicking a field goal for Souths. On 18 September, he played for the Australian Prime Minister's XIII team against Papua New Guinea, playing off the interchange bench in the 34-0 win in Port Moresby.

=== 2006 ===
Sutton played in 21 matches and scored 7 tries for Souths in the 2006 NRL season as the club finished last and claimed the wooden spoon.

=== 2007 ===
In Round 8 against the Brisbane Broncos, Sutton suffered a shoulder injury attempting to score the Rabbitohs match-winning try in dramatic circumstances. Sutton was ruled to have knocked on following a late attempt from Broncos fullback Karmichael Hunt to prevent the try. Souths lost the match 8-4 after a scoreless hour of play at Suncorp Stadium. Sutton missed 9 matches from the injury. Sutton played in 16 matches and scored 3 tries for Souths in the 2007 NRL season as the club qualified for the finals. It was the first time since 1989 that the side had reached the finals.

=== 2008 ===
On 2 May 2008, Sutton played for NSW City Origin against NSW Country Origin at lock and scored a try in the 22-all draw at WIN Stadium. Sutton finished the 2008 NRL season with him playing in all of the Rabbitohs 24 matches and scored 6 tries. In October 2008 Fiji named Sutton in their training squad for the 2008 World Cup, but he pulled out citing injury.

=== 2009 ===
In 2009, Sutton moved to play at five eighth permanently for the Rabbitohs. On 21 April 2009, Sutton was named in the preliminary 40 man squad for game 1 of the 2009 State of Origin series. On 8 May 2009, Sutton played for City Origin against Country at five-eighth in the 40-18 win in Orange, New South Wales. Sutton was one of the favourite for the NSW halves combination, but he injured a knuckle during the City-Country match and missed the Origin series as a result. In Round 13 against the North Queensland Cowboys, Sutton played his 100th NRL career match for the Rabbitohs in the 46-12 loss at 1300SMILES Stadium. In 2009 Sutton won the George Piggins Medal as the South Sydney Rabbitohs' best and fairest player for the season. Sutton played in 22 matches and scored 5 tries for the Rabbitohs in the 2009 NRL season.

=== 2010 ===
Sutton played in 20 matches and scored 4 tries for South Sydney in the 2010 NRL season as the club narrowly missed the finals by finishing ninth under new head coach John Lang.

=== 2011 ===
In Round 20 against the New Zealand Warriors, Sutton played his 150th NRL match for South Sydney in the 48-16 loss at ANZ Stadium. Sutton played in 23 matches and scored 3 tries for South Sydney in the 2011 NRL season.

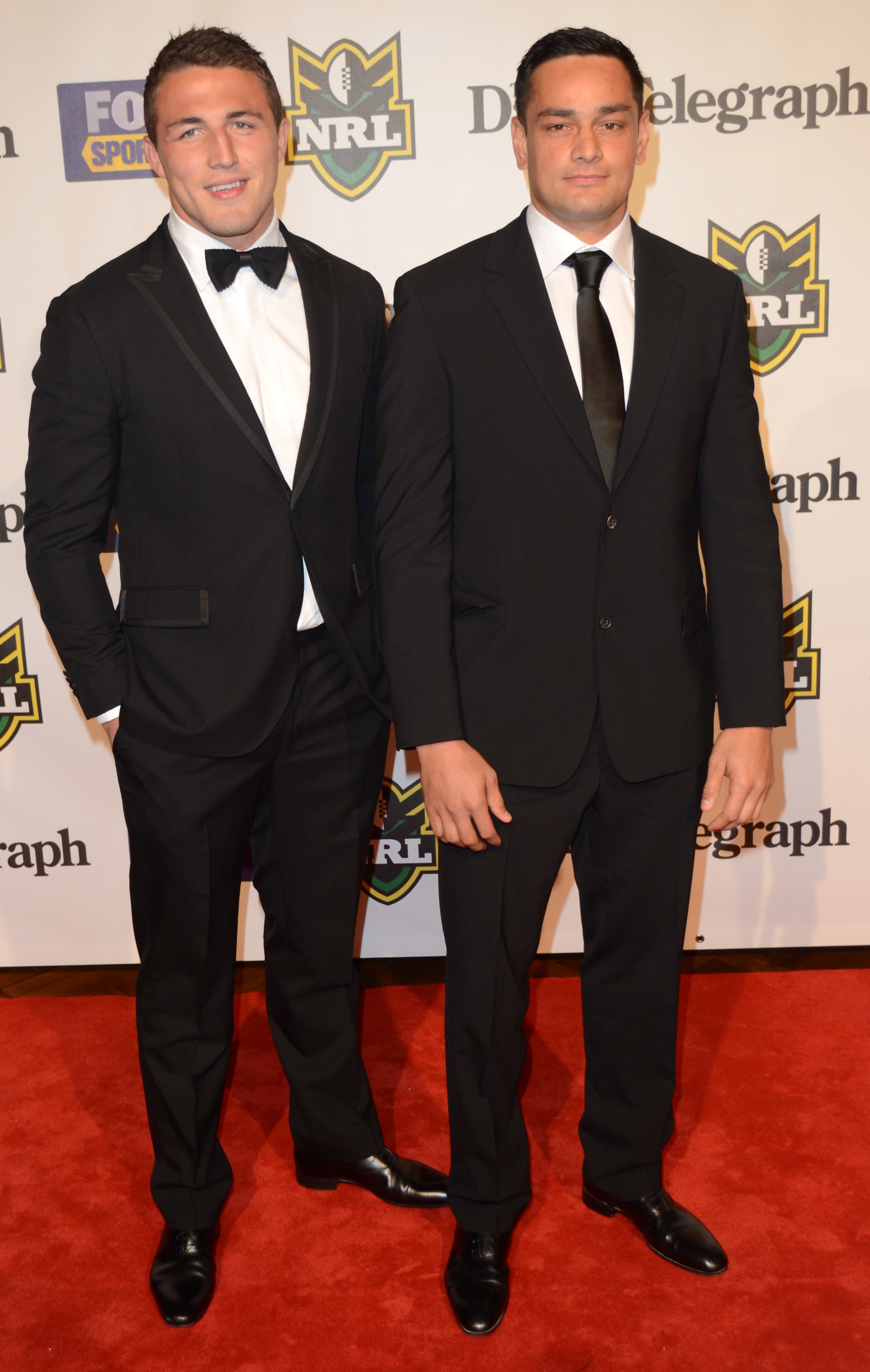
Sam Burgess alongside Sutton

=== 2012 ===
On 29 January 2012, Sutton was named by coach Michael Maguire as one of five co-captains of the South Sydney Rabbitohs alongside Michael Crocker, Sam Burgess, Matt King and Roy Asotasi for the 2012 NRL season. Sutton played in all of South Sydney's 27 matches and scored 4 tries in the season as the club made it to within one game of the grand final but were defeated in the preliminary final by Canterbury-Bankstown.

On 6 October 2012, Sutton again won the George Piggins Medal as the South Sydney Rabbitohs best and fairest player for the season. On 24 September 2012, Sutton was included in the Australian train-on squad.

=== 2013 ===
On 4 April 2013, Sutton re-signed with South Sydney on a four-year contract to the end of the 2017 season. In Round 20 against the Gold Coast Titans, Sutton played his 200th NRL career match for South Sydney in the 32-4 win at Cbus Super Stadium. Sutton played in 25 matches and scored 7 tries for Souths in the 2013 NRL season as the club reached the preliminary final for a second consecutive season but were defeated by Manly-Warringah. At one stage in the match, Souths were ahead 14-0 but a second half capitulation saw the score end 30-20 in Manly's favour.

On 10 October 2013, Sutton and Greg Inglis were named the joint winners of the George Piggins Medal as the South Sydney Rabbitohs best and fairest player for the season. In October 2013, Sutton was named in the Fijian squad for the 2013 World Cup, but was replaced by Ryan Millard prior to the tournament.

=== 2014 ===
In February 2014, Sutton was included in the South Sydney Rabbitohs inaugural Auckland Nines squad. Sutton made the shift back to lock for make way for upcoming five-eighth Luke Keary. In Round 5 against the St George Illawarra Dragons, Sutton became the most capped South Sydney Rabbitohs player with 212 matches overtaking Bob McCarthy with 211 matches, Sutton also made a return to five-eighth in the Rabbitohs 26-6 win at SCG. On 5 October 2014, in South Sydney's 2014 NRL Grand Final against the Canterbury-Bankstown Bulldogs, Sutton played at second-row and captained Souths to a 30-6 Grand Final victory.

=== 2015 ===
On 20 January 2015, Sutton was dumped as captain of South Sydney and was replaced by Greg Inglis after himself and former teammate Luke Burgess got into an incident at a bar in Flagstaff, Arizona, United States . The pair were arrested after a bouncer told them to leave and Burgess threw the bouncer to the ground, the pair were heavily intoxicated and were later charged with disorderly conduct. Later on 2 March 2015, the club received a $20,000 fine by the NRL for the incident. In Round 25 against the Brisbane Broncos, Sutton suffered a season ending broken leg injury in the Rabbitohs woeful 47-12 loss at Sydney Football Stadium. Sutton finished the 2015 NRL season with him playing in 18 matches and scoring 2 tries for Souths as the club reached the finals but were eliminated in the first week by Cronulla-Sutherland which ended their premiership defence.

=== 2016 ===
On 2 February, Sutton was named as the captain of the Rabbitohs 2016 Auckland Nines squad. Although being heavily linked with a move to the super league. In round 1 against the Sydney Roosters, Sutton tore his pectoral and was ruled out for half the season.

=== 2017 ===
Sutton played in all 24 games for Souths in the 2017 NRL season. Towards the end of the year, Sutton signed a one-year extension with Souths for the 2018 season with the goal of becoming the first player in the club's history to pass the 300 game mark.

=== 2018 ===
In 2018, Sutton played his 300th first grade game against the Wests Tigers in a 22-6 defeat. Sutton became the first South Sydney player to reach 300 games and only the 32nd player in the history of the game to reach this milestone. Sutton featured in 27 games as Souths finished 3rd on the table at the end of the regular season and made it all the way to the preliminary final before losing to arch rivals Eastern Suburbs 12-4.

=== 2019 ===
On 14 August 2019, Sutton announced that he would retire at the conclusion of the 2019 NRL season.

Sutton made a total of 27 appearances for South Sydney in the 2019 NRL season as the club finished third on the table and qualified for the finals. Sutton scored his final try for the club in their elimination semi-final victory over Manly at ANZ Stadium. Sutton's last game as a player came the following week against the Canberra Raiders in the preliminary final which South Sydney lost 16-10 at Canberra Stadium.

== Post playing ==
After retiring in 2019, Sutton joined the Rabbitohs coaching staff as a development coach.

In 2020, Sutton was inducted as a life member of the Rabbitohs.

In 2024, Sutton was part of the coaching staff for the Fiji Bati in the Pacific Bowl Championship.

== Statistics ==
Year	Team	Games	Tries	Goals	FGs	Pts
2004	South Sydney Rabbitohs	10	2			8
2005	South Sydney Rabbitohs	19	5	7	1	35
2006	South Sydney Rabbitohs	21	7			28
2007	South Sydney Rabbitohs	16	3			12
2008	South Sydney Rabbitohs	24	6			24
2009	South Sydney Rabbitohs	22	5			20
2010	South Sydney Rabbitohs	20	4			16
2011	South Sydney Rabbitohs	23	3			12
2012	South Sydney Rabbitohs	27	4			16
2013	South Sydney Rabbitohs	25	7			28
2014	South Sydney Rabbitohs	22	1			4
2015	South Sydney Rabbitohs	17	2			8
2016	South Sydney Rabbitohs	12	1			4
2017	South Sydney Rabbitohs	24	5			20
2018	South Sydney Rabbitohs	27	4			16
2019	South Sydney Rabbitohs	27	2			8
	Totals	336	61	7	1	259
