= Ryan Millard =

Fiji international rugby league footballer (born 1987)

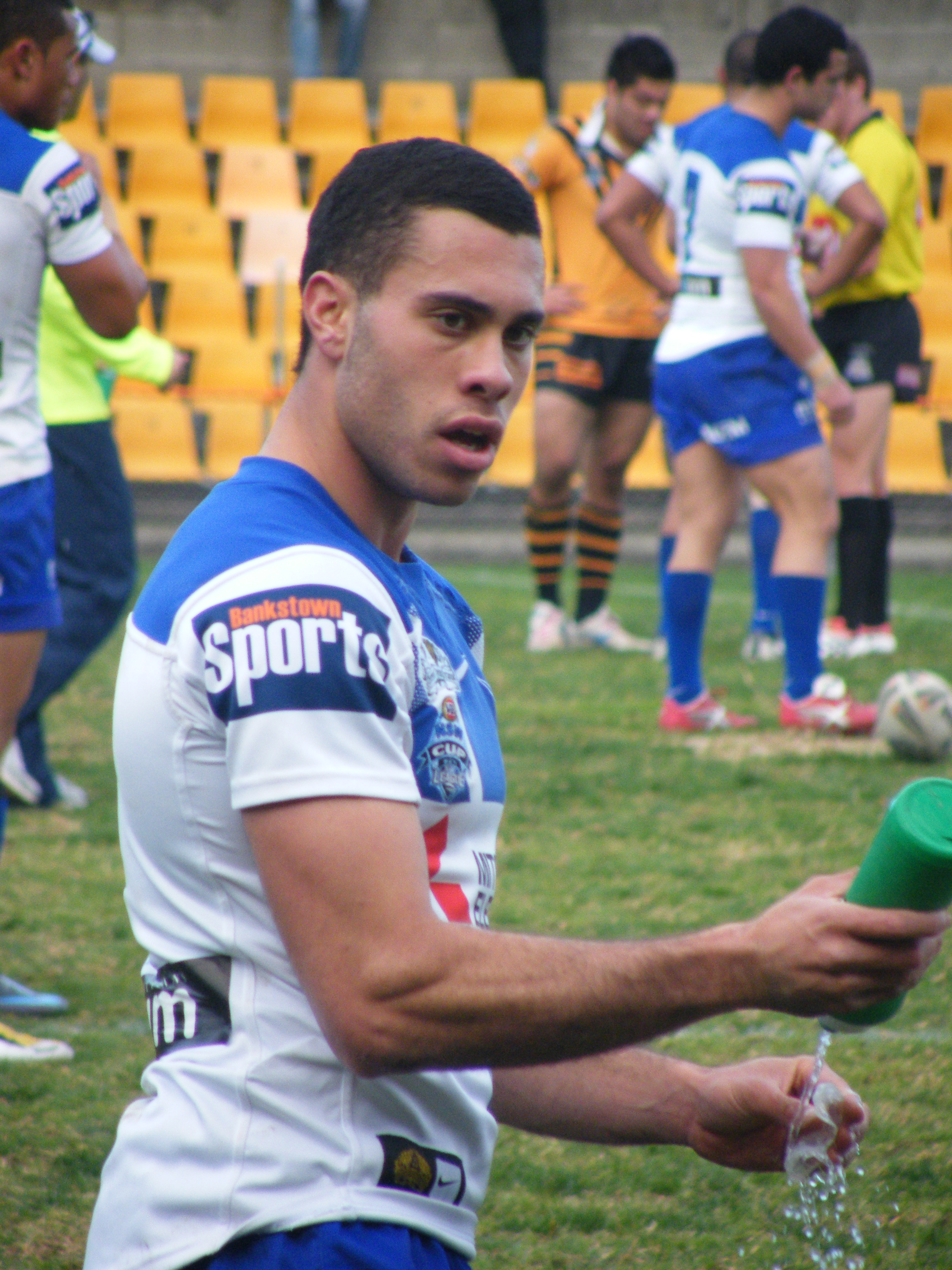

Personal information
- Born: 13 March 1987 (age 39) Hurstville, New South Wales, Australia
- Height: 179 cm (5 ft 10 in)
- Weight: 85 kg (13 st 5 lb)

Playing information
- Position: Five-eighth, Halfback
Club
| Years | Team | Pld | T | G | FG | P |
|---|---|---|---|---|---|---|
| 2014 | Rochdale Hornets | 22 | 12 | 0 | 0 | 48 |
Representative
| Years | Team | Pld | T | G | FG | P |
| 2009–15 | Fiji | 5 | 0 | 0 | 0 | 0 |
- Source: VB New South Wales Cup – 2009 Rochdale – 2014
- Father: Shane Millard
- Relatives: Daryl Millard (brother)

Ryan Millard (born 13 March 1987) is an Australian-born Fijian rugby league footballer who plays for the Wests Magpies in the New South Wales Cup. He plays as a five-eighth or fullback. He is a Fijian international.

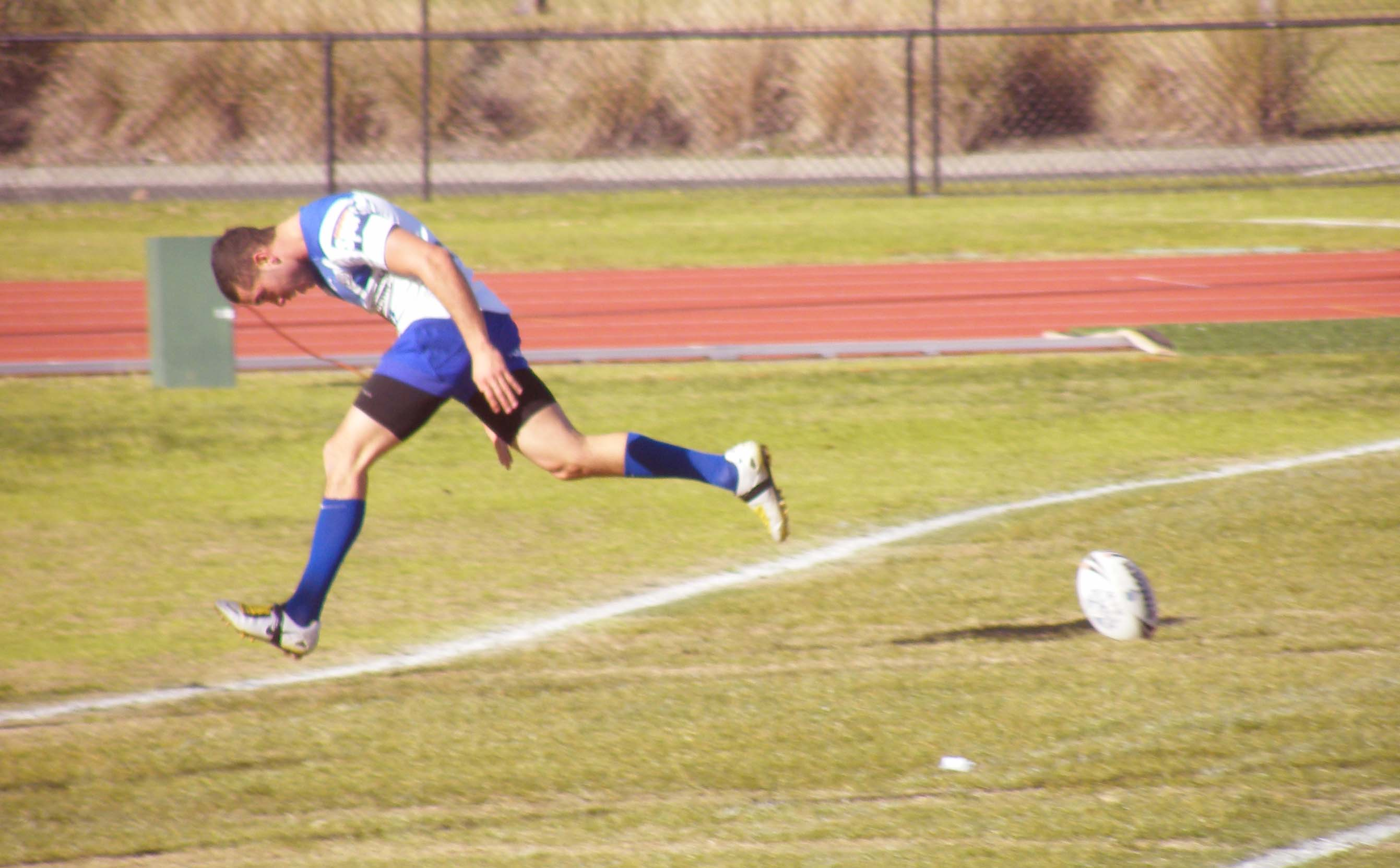
Millard scoring a try for the Bulldogs

== Background ==
Millard was born in Hurstville, Sydney, New South Wales, Australia. He is the younger brother of Daryl Millard.

== Biography ==
His elder brother Daryl Millard plays for South Sydney Rabbitohs in the Australian National Rugby League and is also a Fijian international. Their father, Shane Millard, is the assistant coach of the Australian Fijian rugby team. Shane is a former reserve-grade coach for the St George Dragons and also coached the USA Tomahawks. There is no relation between the family and journeyman Australian-born former USA international hooker and second-row Shane Millard, although this is sometimes reported as the case.

== Career ==
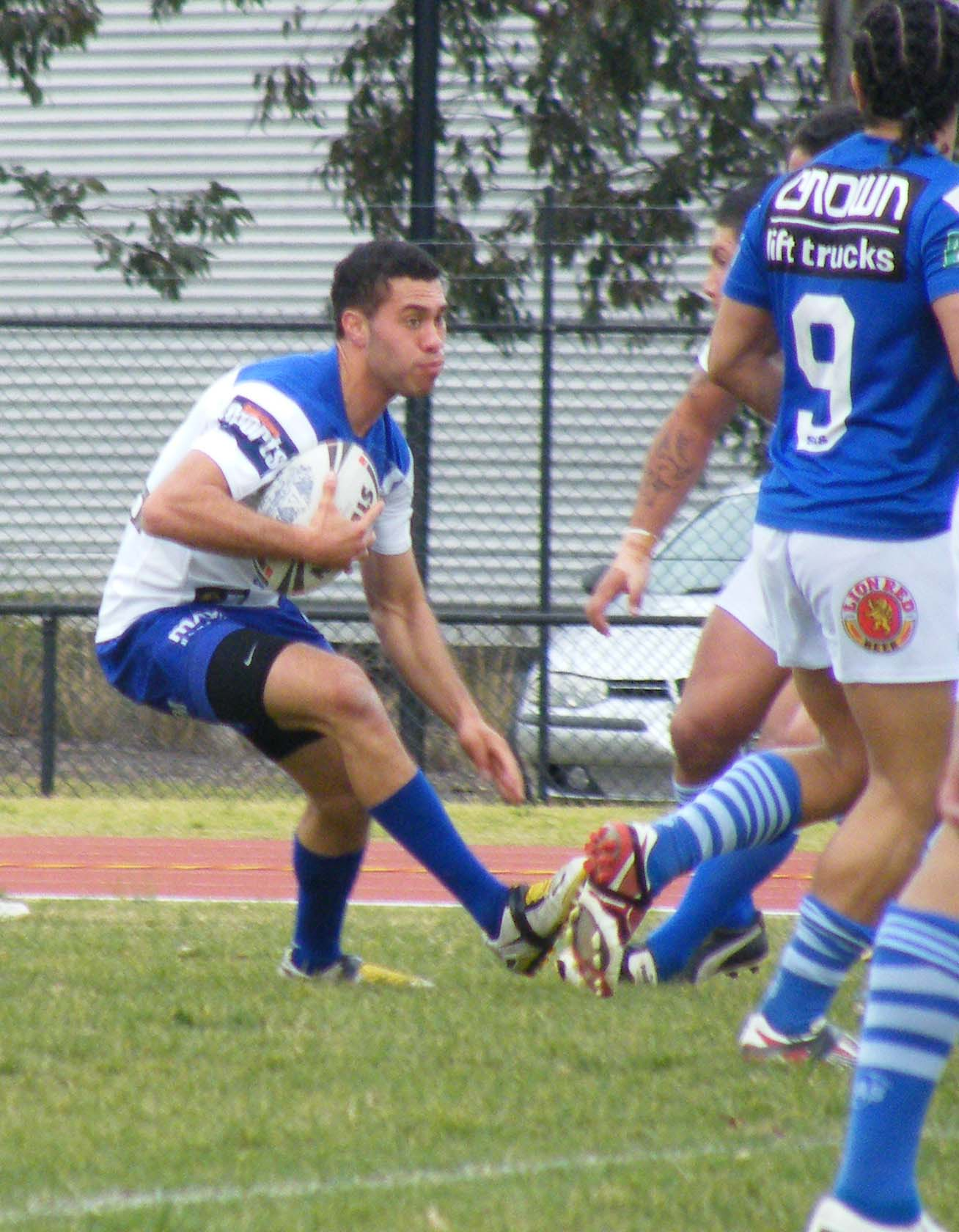
Millard in action for the Bullodgs

=== Domestic ===
Ryan Millard played junior rugby league for Renown United and previously played in the youth teams at the St. George Illawarra Dragons, playing in the Jersey Flegg and SG Ball sides for the Dragons. He failed to make first grade with St. George Illawarra and moved with his brother to the Bulldogs for the 2007 season. He played in the New South Wales Cup for the Canterbury-Bankstown Bulldogs in 2008 and for the Newtown Jets in 2009. For the 2010 season he moved to the Shellharbour City Dragons, the New South Wales Cup team that act as a feeder club to the NRL club St. George Illawarra Dragons.

=== International ===
Millard played for Fiji against the Junior Kangaroos in a narrow 15–14 loss in 2007. He was not selected in either the wider training squad nor the final 25-man Fiji squad for the 2008 Rugby League World Cup. He made his full international debut for Fiji in the 2009 Pacific Cup. Millard has also represented the Australian Fijian rugby team and was named Australian Fijian Fiji Bati Player of the Year for 2009. Millard is eligible to play for Fiji as he has a Fijian mother.

He was a late call-up to Fiji's 2013 Rugby League World Cup squad after John Sutton was ruled out before the tournament.

Following the 2013 Rugby League World Cup Millard followed in the footsteps of other Fijians and was signed by Hornets CEO Ryan Bradley for Rochdale Hornets.

On 2 May 2015, Ryan played for Fiji in the Melanesian Cup test-match.
