= George Piggins Medal =

Australian rugby league award

The George Piggins medal is an Australian rugby league award given each season to the player or players adjudged player of the year for the South Sydney Rabbitohs. It is named after former South Sydney player, coach, and administrator George Piggins, who also was responsible for South Sydney's successful bid to be reinstated to the National Rugby League following their exclusion in 1999.

The medal has been awarded since the 2003 season, along with other awards for the Rabbitohs' first grade, reserve grade, and women's sides.

John Sutton and Sam Burgess share the record for most medals won, with three apiece.

== George Piggins Medal ==
Season	Player	Position	Ref
2003	Bryan Fletcher	Second-row	
2004	Ashley Harrison	Lock	
2005	Peter Cusack	Prop	
2006	David Fa'alogo	Second-row	
2007	Roy Asotasi	Prop	
2008	Luke Stuart	Prop	
2009	John Sutton	Five-eighth	
2010	Issac Luke	Hooker	
2011	Nathan Merritt	Wing	
2012	John Sutton (2)	Five-eighth	
2013	John Sutton (3)	Five-eighth	
2013	Greg Inglis	Fullback	
2014	Sam Burgess	Lock	
2015	Greg Inglis (2)	Fullback	
2016	Sam Burgess (2)	Lock	
2017	Sam Burgess (3)	Lock	
2018	Damien Cook	Hooker	
2019	Damien Cook (2)	Hooker	
2020	Cody Walker	Five-eighth	
2021	Cody Walker (2)	Five-eighth	
2022	Junior Tatola	Prop	
2023	Campbell Graham	Centre	
2024	Jack Wighton	Centre / Five-eighth	
2025	Jai Arrow	Second-row	
2026	Cameron Murray	Lock	

=== Multiple recipients ===
Medals	Player	Seasons
3	John Sutton	2009, 2012, 2013
3	Sam Burgess	2014, 2016, 2017
2	Greg Inglis	2013, 2015
2	Damien Cook	2018, 2019
2	Cody Walker	2020, 2021

== Other awards ==
=== NRL ===
Several additional awards are given to standout players. These include the Jack Rayner award for players' player, the Bob McCarthy award for clubman of the year, the John Sattler award for rookie of the year, the Roy Asotasi award for members' choice, and The Burrow Appreciation award.

Year	Jack Rayner Award	Bob McCarthy Award	John Sattler Award	Roy Asotasi Award	The Burrow Appreciation	Souths Cares Award
2003	Luke Stuart	Jason Death	Mark Minichiello	Justin Smith	—	—
2004	Ashley Harrison	Ashley Harrison	Joe Williams	Mark Minichiello	—	—
2005	Peter Cusack	Luke Stuart	Manase Manuokafoa	John Sutton	—	—
2005	Peter Cusack	Luke Stuart	Yileen Gordon	John Sutton	—	—
2006	Nathan Merritt	Peter Cusack	Germaine Paulson	Nathan Merritt	—	Beau Champion
2007	Roy Asotasi	Luke Stuart	Issac Luke	Roy Asotasi	Paul Mellor	Dean Widders
2008	Luke Stuart	Beau Champion	Chris Sandow	Luke Stuart	Luke Stuart	Jamie Simpson
2008	Nathan Merritt	Beau Champion	Chris Sandow	Luke Stuart	Luke Stuart	Jamie Simpson
2009	Luke Stuart	Scott Geddes	David Tyrrell	Nathan Merritt	Nathan Merritt	Jamie Simpson
2010	Sam Burgess	Sam Burgess	Dylan Farrell	Issac Luke	Chris Sandow	Whole squad
2011	Chris Sandow	Michael Crocker	Nathan Peats	Michael Crocker	Michael Crocker	Whole squad
2012	Greg Inglis	Sam Burgess	Adam Reynolds	Adam Reynolds	Adam Reynolds	—
2012	Greg Inglis	Michael Crocker	Adam Reynolds	Adam Reynolds	Adam Reynolds	—
2013	Sam Burgess	Matt King	Dylan Walker	Issac Luke	Issac Luke	—
2014	Sam Burgess	Sam Burgess	Alex Johnston	Sam Burgess	Sam Burgess	—
2015	Greg Inglis	Ben Lowe	Chris Grevsmuhl	Bryson Goodwin	Jason Clark	—
2016	Sam Burgess	Jason Clark	Cody Walker	Cody Walker	Kyle Turner	—
2017	Angus Crichton	Damien Cook	Cameron Murray	Angus Crichton	Angus Crichton	—
2018	Sam Burgess	John Sutton	Adam Doueihi	Damien Cook	Damien Cook	—
2019	Cameron Murray	Braidon Burns	Corey Allan	Damien Cook	John Sutton	—
2020	Cody Walker	Damien Cook	Keaon Koloamatangi	Adam Reynolds	Thomas Burgess	—
2021	Cody Walker	Mark Nicholls	Blake Taaffe	Cameron Murray	Cody Walker	Cody Walker
2022	Campbell Graham	Jacob Host	Lachlan Ilias	Cameron Murray	Alex Johnston	Cody Walker
2023	Cody Walker	Yileen Gordon	Tyrone Munro	Cameron Murray	Campbell Graham	Latrell Mitchell
2024	Jack Wighton	Ben Lovett	Jye Gray	Cameron Murray	Jai Arrow	Ben Lovett
2025	Jye Gray	Jai Arrow	Jamie Humphreys	Jye Gray	Jye Gray	Jai Arrow
2026	Cameron Murray	Jai Arrow	Latrell Siegwalt	Alex Johnston	Tallis Duncan	Campbell Graham

=== NSW Cup ===
Year	Best & Fairest	Players' Player
2008	Trent Totter	Jason Clark
2009	Jason Clark	Jason Clark
2010	Matt Mundine	Malcolm Webster
2011	Kyle Turner	Adrian Ha’angana
2012	Luke Keary	Jesse Roberts
2013	Cameron McInnes	Cameron McInnes
2014	Cheyne Whitelaw	Jack Gosiewski
2015	Clayton Williams	Clayton Williams
2016	Maia Sands	Maia Sands
2017	Gabe Hamlin	Campbell Graham
2018	—	—
2019	Billy Brittain	Billy Brittain
2020	Season suspended due to the COVID-19 pandemic	
2021	Dean Hawkins	Trent Peoples
2022	Shaquai Mitchell	Dean Hawkins
2023	Tallis Duncan	Dean Hawkins
2024	Ryan Gray	Ryan Gray
2025	Ashton Ward	Tim Johannssen
2026	John Radel	Jordi Mazzone

=== Jersey Flegg Cup ===
Year	Player of the Year	Players Player
2019	Blake Taaffe	Ky Rodwell
2020	Season suspended due to the COVID-19 pandemic	
2021	Ben Lovett	Tallis Aniganga
2022	Tallis Duncan	Tallis Duncan
2023	Romano Cook	Archie Donnelly
2024	Louis Grossemy	Carson Kaho
2025	Josh Alhazim	Yehya Ayache
2026	Assariah Lenoy	Ben Geary

=== NSWRL Women's Premiership ===
Year	Player of the Year	Players' Player
2018	Maddie Studdon	Chloe Caldwell
2018	Maddie Studdon	Taleena Simon
2019	Karri Doyle	Kyla Gordon
2020	Ellie Johnston	Janaya Bent
2021	Seli Mailangi	Katie Brown
2022	Seli Mailangi	Ellie Johnston
2023	Patricia Raikadroka	Pihuka Berryman-Duff
2024		
2025	Jazmon Tupou-Witchman	Luisa Yaranamua
2026	Claudia Brown	Jazmon Tupou-Witchman
