= Peter Cusack (rugby league) =

Australian rugby league footballer

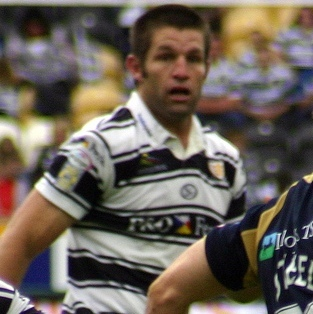
- Cusack playing for Hull in 2008

Personal information
- Full name: Peter Cusack
- Born: 27 January 1977 (age 48) Young, New South Wales, Australia

Playing information
- Height: 193 cm (6 ft 4 in)
- Weight: 105 kg (16 st 7 lb)
- Position: Prop
Club
Years	Team	Pld	T	G	FG	P
1998–04	Sydney Roosters	95	4	0	0	16
2005–07	South Sydney	73	3	0	0	12
2008–10	Hull FC	62	4	0	0	16
	Total	230	11	0	0	44
Representative
Years	Team	Pld	T	G	FG	P
2004–07	NSW Country	2	0	0	0	0

Peter Cusack (born 27 January 1977) is an Australian former professional rugby league footballer who played in the 1990s and 2000s. A Country New South Wales representative prop, Cusack played his club football in Australasia's National Rugby League for the Sydney Roosters and South Sydney Rabbitohs, and in the Super League for Hull FC.

== Early life ==
Born in Young, New South Wales, Cusack was educated at St. Gregory's College in Campbelltown, New South Wales. He was discovered by Arthur Beetson during a game for their 1st team and trialed with the Sydney Roosters.

== Playing career ==
Cusack made his National Rugby League premiership début with the Sydney Roosters in the 1998 NRL season. A front-rower, Cusack was one of the last remaining top-level league players to hold a job outside football, working part-time as a plumber. He played in the 2000 NRL Grand Final loss to the Brisbane Broncos. Cusack was awarded the 2002 Sydney Roosters season's Clubman of the Year and played in their 2002 NRL Grand Final victory over the New Zealand Warriors. He was also a member of the Roosters side that won the 2003 World Club Challenge, and appeared in the 2003 NRL Grand Final loss to the Penrith Panthers. Cusack played for the Roosters from the interchange bench in their 2004 NRL grand final loss to cross-Sydney rivals, Canterbury-Bankstown.

In 2005, Cusack joined the South Sydney Rabbitohs, that year winning the George Piggins Medal as the club's best and fairest player for the season. He served as a co-captain at the club, along with Roy Asotasi and David Kidwell.

In the 2006 NRL season, Cusack played 24 games as South Sydney finished last on the table. The season also saw Souths lose 66–0 against the New Zealand Warriors which is the club's worst ever defeat since entering the competition in 1908.

In November, 2007 Cusack signed to play in the Super League with English club Hull F.C. on a two-year contract. He retired at the end of 2010 season.
