= David Kidwell =

NZ RL coach and former NZ international rugby league footballer

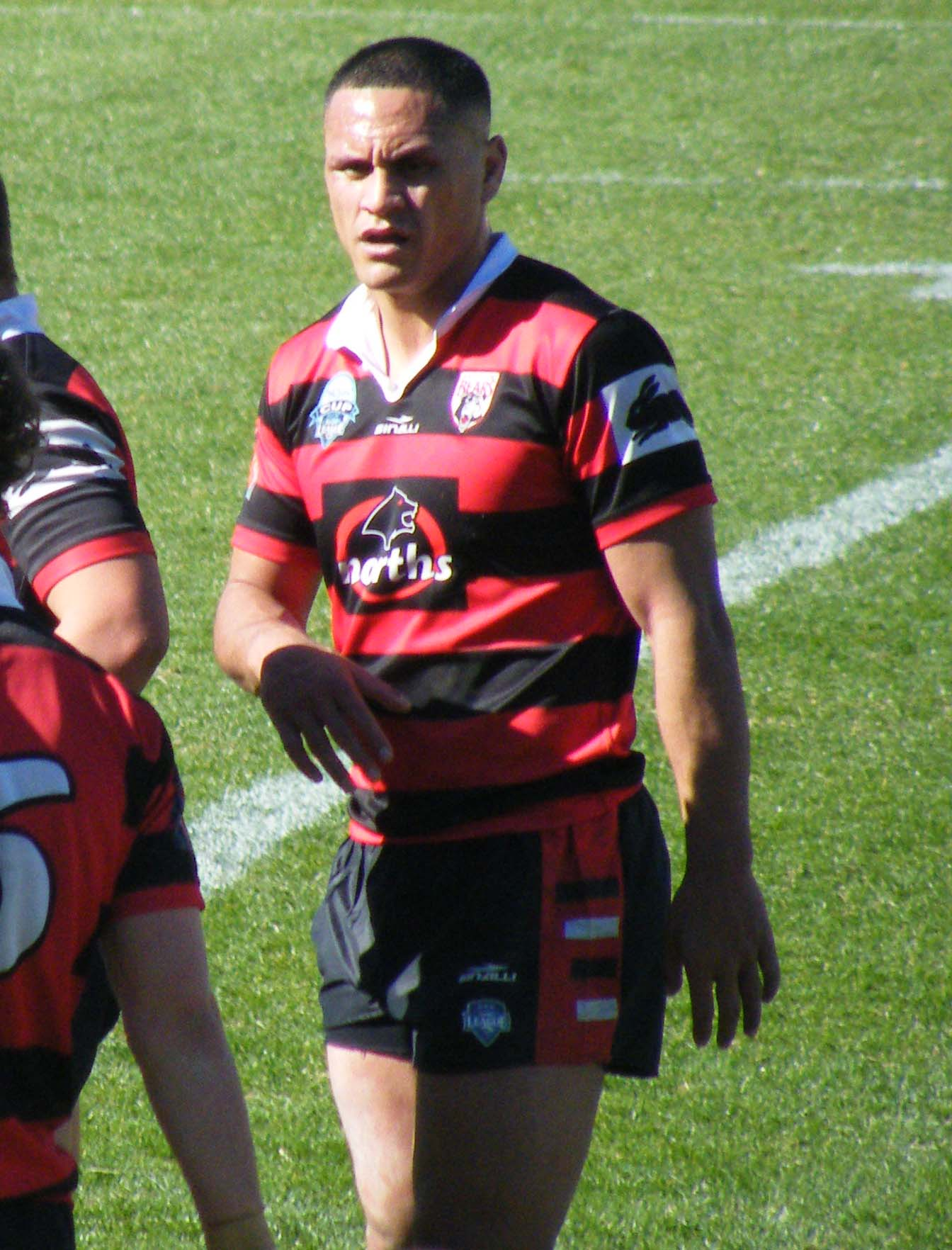

Personal information
- Full name: David Leon Peter Jamie Kidwell
- Born: 23 April 1977 (age 49) Christchurch, New Zealand

Playing information
- Height: 189 cm (6 ft 2 in)
- Weight: 108 kg (17 st 0 lb)
- Position: Second-row, Centre
Club
Years	Team	Pld	T	G	FG	P
1997–98	Adelaide Rams	16	2	0	0	8
1999–00	Parramatta Eels	33	8	0	0	32
2001–02	Warrington Wolves	32	12	0	0	48
2002	Sydney Roosters	19	3	0	0	12
2003–06	Melbourne Storm	103	18	0	0	72
2007–09	South Sydney	38	3	0	0	12
	Total	241	46	0	0	184
Representative
Years	Team	Pld	T	G	FG	P
1999–08	New Zealand	25	4	0	0	16
2000	Aotearoa Māori	3	1	0	0	4

Coaching information
Representative
Years	Team	Gms	W	D	L	W%
2016–18	New Zealand	12	5	1	6	42
2020–22	Māori All Stars	3	2	1	0	67

David Kidwell (born 23 April 1977) is a New Zealand professional rugby coach and former rugby league player who is the defence coach for the Highlanders in Super Rugby. As a player, he represented New Zealand as a member of the 2005 Tri-Nations and 2008 World Cup winning New Zealand teams. He primarily played as a second-row, though he started his career as a centre.

== Background ==
Kidwell was born in Christchurch, New Zealand.

== Playing career ==
A Hornby Panthers junior in the Canterbury Rugby League competition, in 1995 Kidwell played in the Lion Red Cup for the Canterbury Country Cardinals.

He then joined the Canterbury-Bankstown Bulldogs in 1996 and also made the 1996 Junior Kiwis that year. He made his first grade début on 17 August 1997 in round 17 for the Adelaide Rams against Canberra at Canberra Stadium. In 1999, Kidwell joined Parramatta and played in the clubs heart breaking preliminary final loss to Melbourne that year where the club was leading 16-6 but lost 18–16. Kidwell was selected for the New Zealand team to compete in the end of season 1999 Rugby League Tri-Nations tournament. In the final against Australia he played from the interchange bench in the Kiwis' 22–20 loss. Between 2001 and 2002, Kidwell played for Warrington in the Super League. In 2002, Kidwell joined the Sydney Roosters, he played 18 games for the club but missed out on playing in the clubs 2002 NRL Grand Final victory over the New Zealand Warriors.

In 2003, Kidwell joined Melbourne playing a total of 103 games for the club including the 2006 NRL Grand Final where the Storm lost to the Broncos 15–8. In 2006, Kidwell signed a pre-contract agreement to represent the South Sydney Rabbitohs until 2009.

In the 2007 pre-season, it was announced that Kidwell would be co-captain of the South Sydney Rabbitohs, along with Peter Cusack for 2007. In April 2007, Kidwell was ruled out for the season after suffering a freak accident at home where he tripped over one of his children and injured his knee. At the end of 2007 Kidwell was named in the Melbourne Storm team of the decade. After failing an alcohol test on 2 May 2008, the South Sydney club stripped Kidwell of his co-captaincy and four others who failed were relegated to the bench for their Sunday match against North Queensland. Kidwell retired from rugby league at the end of the 2009 season.

== Representative career ==
Kidwell made his New Zealand début in 1999.

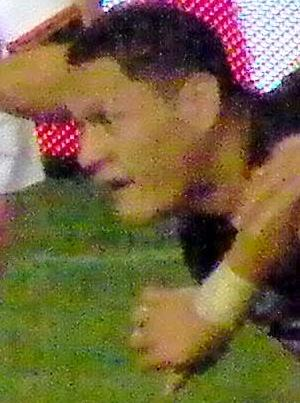
Kidwell playing for the Kiwis at the 2008 RLWC

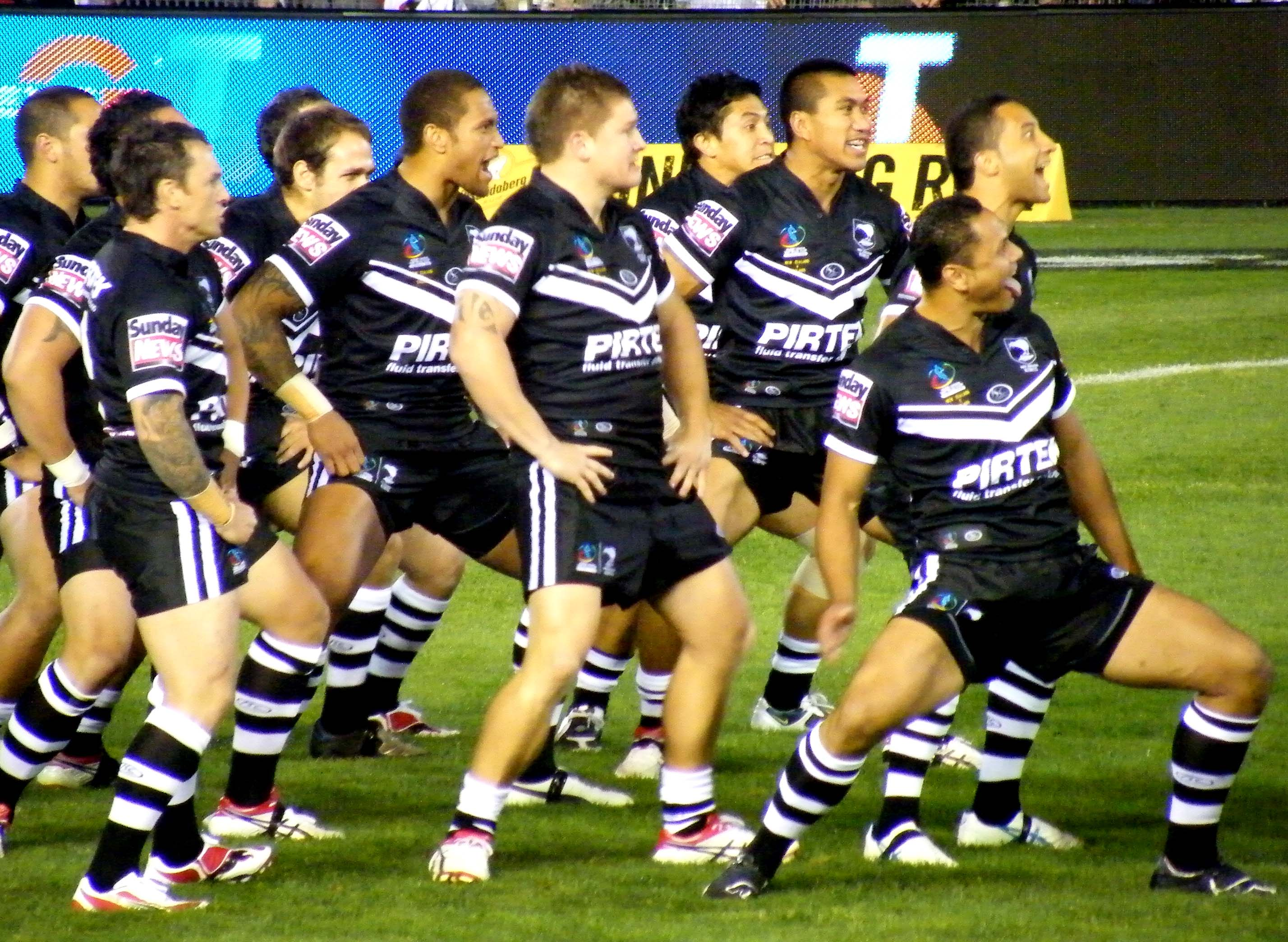
Kidwell (right) performing the Haka for New Zealand in 2008

In August 2008, Kidwell was named in the New Zealand training squad for the 2008 Rugby League World Cup, and in October 2008, he was named in the final 24-man Kiwi squad.

== Coaching career ==
Kidwell was appointed the Rabbitohs Toyota Cup (Under 20s competition) coach for 2010. They finished minor premiers that year and made the Grand Final, but were defeated 42–28 by the Under 20s New Zealand Warriors. He later worked as an assistant coach at the Melbourne Storm under Craig Bellamy. On 16 September 2013 it was announced that he would be joining the Wests Tigers in 2014 as an assistant coach.

Kidwell joined the New Zealand national rugby league team as an assistant coach in 2014. After Stephen Kearney left the role of being the head coach of the New Zealand national team in 2016, Kidwell was later appointed as the new Kiwis head coach, Kidwell oversaw a brief but embarrassing era for New Zealand Rugby League in which they lost two World Cup matches to tier-2 nations, and fluked a draw against another in the 2016 Four Nations tournament. A series of critical failures in team culture and management led to disappointing results and a mass exodus of players. One notable player to leave the team was Jason Taumololo. Taumololo defected to Tonga, who defeated New Zealand in a World Cup pool match. Kidwell was replaced by Michael Maguire after failing to make the semi-finals of the 2017 World Cup.

In 2018, Kidwell was appointed as assistant coach at one of his former clubs The Parramatta Eels.

In May 2022 it was announced that Kidwell had been appointed defensive coach of the Argentina rugby union side, by head coach Michael Cheika.

In February 2025 it was announced that Kidwell would reunite with Michael Cheika, joining Leicester Tigers as their defence coach on secondment from Japan rugby until the end of the season.

Following the end of the 2024/25 season, Kidwell has left his role with Japan rugby and joined Otago Highlanders as their defence coach on a 2 year contract.

=== Kiwis coaching record ===
Opponent	Played	Won	Drew	Lost	Win Ratio (%)
Australia	4	0	0	4	00.00
England	1	1	0	0	100.00
Fiji	1	0	0	1	00.00
Samoa	1	1	0	0	100.00
Scotland	2	1	1	0	50.00
Tonga	1	0	0	1	00.00
TOTAL	10	3	1	6	30.00
