= Ashley Harrison =

Australian rugby league footballer

Ash Harrison
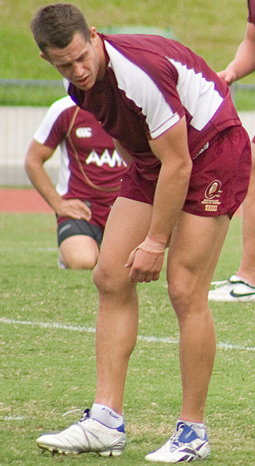

Personal information
- Full name: Ashley Harrison
- Born: 18 May 1981 (age 45) Brisbane, Queensland, Australia

Playing information
- Height: 188 cm (6 ft 2 in)
- Weight: 97 kg (15 st 4 lb)
- Position: Lock, Five-eighth, Second-row
Club
Years	Team	Pld	T	G	FG	P
2000–02	Brisbane Broncos	52	16	0	0	64
2003–05	South Sydney	66	21	0	0	84
2006–07	Sydney Roosters	41	7	0	0	28
2008–14	Gold Coast Titans	117	12	0	0	48
	Total	276	56	0	0	224
Representative
Years	Team	Pld	T	G	FG	P
2005	Prime Minister's XIII	1	0	0	0	0
2005–13	Queensland	15	0	0	0	0
2011–13	NRL All Stars	2	0	0	0	0

Ashley Harrison (born 18 May 1981) is an Australian former professional rugby league footballer who played as a lock in the 2000s and 2010s.

He played for the Gold Coast Titans in the NRL. A Queensland State of Origin representative lock forward, he also played club football for the Brisbane Broncos (with whom he won the 2000 NRL Premiership), South Sydney Rabbitohs and Sydney Roosters.

== Background ==
Harrison was born in Brisbane, Queensland, Australia.

== Playing career ==
=== Early career ===
Harrison attended Wavell State High School in Brisbane, Queensland, and played junior football for Brisbane Brothers and Norths Aspley.

He represented the Australian Schoolboys team in 1998.

=== Brisbane Broncos ===
Harrison made his debut in the National Rugby League for the Brisbane Broncos against the New Zealand Warriors on 20 February 2000 (Round 3). He played from the interchange bench for the Broncos in their 2000 NRL grand final victory over the Sydney Roosters.

Having won the 2000 NRL Premiership, the Broncos traveled to England to play against 2000's Super League V Champions, St Helens R.F.C. for the 2001 World Club Challenge, with Harrison playing from the interchange bench in Brisbane's loss.

=== South Sydney Rabbitohs ===
After moving to the South Sydney Rabbitohs, he was named the club's player of the year, winning the George Piggins Medal in 2004, and serving as the club's captain for a brief period in 2005.

Harrison was selected to play for Queensland in Game III, 2005, becoming South Sydney's first Queensland Origin representative in many years. Shortly after, he was promoted to the Rabbitohs captaincy, which coincided with the team winning six of their final eight matches of the season to avoid the wooden spoon (the only losses in that period being against the eventual Grand Finalists, Wests Tigers and North Queensland).

=== Sydney Roosters ===
Harrison moved to South Sydney's arch rivals the Sydney Roosters for the 2006 NRL season. He managed 41 out of a possible 48 matches at the Roosters.

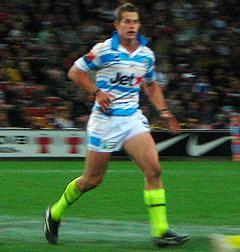
Harrison playing for the Gold Coast Titans in 2008

=== Gold Coast Titans ===
Harrison returned to Queensland to play for the Gold Coast Titans from 2008. At the Titans, he started at lock and performed well covering five-eighth also while Matthew Rogers was out on suspension.

As a result, he was named 18th man for the 2008 State of Origin series for Queensland. He started in both the second and third State of Origin games. Harrison was picked ahead of his club captain Scott Prince (who was only drafted into the squad after a knee injury sustained by Darren Lockyer) to play in the second State of Origin on 11 June 2008.

In April 2009, he was named in the preliminary 25-man squad to represent Queensland in the opening State of Origin match for 2009.

In the 2009 NRL season, Harrison was part of the first Gold Coast team to reach the finals. Harrison played in both finals matches against the Brisbane Broncos and Parramatta. The following year, Harrison was a member of the Gold Coast side which enjoyed their best season on the field as they eventually reached the preliminary final before being defeated by Harrison's old club the Sydney Roosters. In the 2011 NRL season, Harrison was limited to only 13 games as the Gold Coast finished last on the table and claimed the wooden spoon.

Harrison was only selected for Game I of the 2013 State of Origin series in which Queensland extended their record for consecutive series victories to eight.

On 27 June 2014, he confirmed his retirement earlier than he wanted due to a neck injury.
