= George Piggins =

Australian rugby league footballer, coach and administrator

Personal information
- Full name: George Leslie Piggins
- Born: 14 October 1944 (age 82)
- Height: 165 cm (5 ft 5 in)

Playing information
- Position: Hooker
Club
Years	Team	Pld	T	G	FG	P
1967–78	South Sydney	118	6	0	0	18
Representative
Years	Team	Pld	T	G	FG	P
1974–76	New South Wales	2	0	0	0	0
1975	Australia	3	0	0	0	0

Coaching information
Club
Years	Team	Gms	W	D	L	W%
1986–90	South Sydney	120	61	6	53	51

George Leslie Piggins AM (born 14 October 1944) is an Australian rugby league personality. He is a former player, coach and administrator of the South Sydney Rabbitohs club. Following their exclusion from the National Rugby League premiership at the end of the Super League war, Piggins also successfully led the Rabbitohs' battle for re-inclusion in the NRL in the early 2000s. Since 2003, the "George Piggins Medal" has been awarded annually to South Sydney's player of the year.

== Playing career ==
Of English descent, and once a wharf labourer from the Southern Sydney suburb of Mascot, Piggins played the game as a hooker. He established himself in the NSWRFL Premiership's first grade in 1967 but was left out for Elwyn Walters in the finals and took several years to re-establish himself. In 1971 Piggins played a superb game in the grand final when Walters was injured and late the following year finally established a permanent first grade berth for good. In 1974, with Walters leaving for Easts, Piggins advanced so much that was selected to play for New South Wales during the 1974 Great Britain Lions tour, and the following year, despite Souths finishing last after winning only two of their last sixteen games, Piggins' toughness saw him represent Australia three times in the 1975 World Series. The following year, he scored a memorable bustling try (one of only eight in 120 first grade games) against the Western Suburbs Magpies and again played for New South Wales. With injuries catching up, however, Piggins retired at the end of 1978, but his experience and the skill of coach Jack Gibson that season was an important precursor for the Rabbitohs reaching the semi-finals in 1980 after winning only one of their last eighteen games in 1977.

Post playing Piggins worked as a truck driver, eventually starting his own trucking business. He also invented a device which increased the rate at which trucks could be unloaded. His invention and business were later sold for millions of dollars.

== Coaching career ==
In 1986, Piggins took over as first grade coach and was awarded the Coca-Cola Rugby League Coach-of-the-Year award for taking South Sydney to the finals in his rookie year, and just missing out (by one point) on winning the minor premiership. Piggins at the time gave tribute to Phil Gould for his contribution to the development of the team and himself as coach. Piggins won a trip for two to Atlanta to study American football as part of his award.

With the work-rate of a relatively lightweight but extremely tough forward pack containing Les Davidson, David Boyle, Michael Andrews, Wayne Chisholm, captain Mario Fenech and young giant Ian Roberts, Piggins took the Rabbitohs into the finals again in his second season. Although they scored the fewest tries of the thirteen clubs playing, their ability to win tight, low-scoring games kept the Rabbitohs at the top of the table. Injuries to their pack in 1988 saw them finish eighth despite remedying their weakness in backline pace through acquiring Phil Blake. The side was also set back by the loss of two premiership points due to Piggins playing 17-year-old President's Cup player Scott Wilson in a game against Manly which Souths won, due to a breach of replacement rules. 1989 saw the Rabbitohs as the undisputed pace-setters until the finals, winning twelve games in a row through a watertight defence and skilful, solid backline play. 1990, however, was a disaster as Boyle, Andrews and Chisholm succumbed to injury and Roberts, who by this time was Souths best player, was lost to Manly. The Rabbitohs' watertight defence became incredibly thin and the team won only two games all season – actually conceding more tries in their last five games than in the entire 1989 home-and-away season. Piggins was axed as coach at the end of that year to be replaced by Frank Curry in 1990, but stayed involved by becoming Chairman of the Leagues Club.

== Administration ==
In 2000 Piggins was awarded the Australian Sports Medal for his contribution to Australia's international standing in the sport of rugby league.

Due to the National Rugby League's plans for a fourteen-team competition, the South Sydney club was excluded from the NRL premiership commencing with the 2000 season. Piggins was the chairman of the South Sydney club during the legal battle against the NRL for re-inclusion in the premiership, which was achieved during 2001. He led the marches and even put up $3.2 million of his own money in a mortgage on the club's block of units adjacent to the leagues club. That year Piggins was awarded the Centenary Medal "for service to the sport of rugby league" as the Rabbitohs returned to the playing field in 2002. At the start of that year his book, Never Say Die: The Fight to save the Rabbitohs was published. Its title refers to the persistence needed to keep the South Sydney club in the top-level competition. In 2002, Piggins was further honoured as a Member of the Order of Australia "for service to Rugby League football as an administrator, coach and player, and to the South Sydney community".

Also in 2002 he was replaced as chairman of the club by the lawyer who led the battle with News for re-inclusion, Nick Pappas.

Since 2003, the "George Piggins Medal" has been awarded by the South Sydney club to the Rabbitohs' best and fairest player of the season.

With the club's vote to allow Russell Crowe and Peter Holmes à Court's private ownership of the Rabbitohs in 2006, Piggins walked away from the South Sydney Club, as he didn't approve of what the new ownership represented.

On October 1, 2014, Piggins announced that he would be attending his first Souths game in nearly a decade, which was the 2014 NRL Grand Final between South Sydney and Canterbury-Bankstown. Piggins said in September 2014 he would only attend the decider if someone paid $100,000 to a charity of his choice. After Tab Corp, News Corp and 2GB owner John Singleton came up with the money, Piggins said he would attend. Piggins also came face to face with Souths co-owner Russell Crowe for the first time since 2006. South Sydney would go on to win their first premiership in 43 years, defeating Canterbury 30-6 at ANZ Stadium. His sister, Kim Piggins married Greek-Australian businessman and Souths bit part player, Peter Anasta who would become the parents of first grade footballer, Braith Anasta and Piggins' nephew.

== Sources ==
- George Piggins at eraofthebiff.com
- "In George We Trust" – Australian Story Transcript
- George Piggins at nrlstats.com
