= David Fa'alogo =

Former NZ & Samoa international rugby league footballer

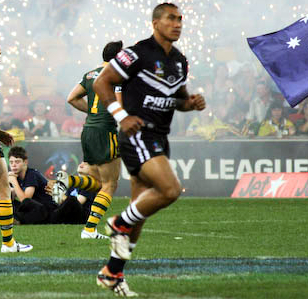

Personal information
- Full name: Daniel David Fa'alogo
- Born: 9 September 1980 (age 46) Auckland, New Zealand

Playing information
- Height: 185 cm (6 ft 1 in)
- Weight: 102 kg (16 st 1 lb)
- Position: Second-row, Prop, Lock
Club
Years	Team	Pld	T	G	FG	P
2003–09	South Sydney	142	24	0	0	96
2010–12	Huddersfield Giants	57	15	0	0	60
2013–15	Newcastle Knights	56	3	0	0	12
	Total	255	42	0	0	168
Representative
Years	Team	Pld	T	G	FG	P
2006–09	New Zealand	12	1	0	0	4
2011–12	Exiles	2	0	0	0	0
2013–14	Samoa	8	1	0	0	4
- Relatives: Sala Fa'alogo (brother)

David Fa'alogo (born 9 September 1980) is a former professional rugby league footballer played as a prop, second-row and lock in the 2000s and 2010s. He played for the South Sydney Rabbitohs and Newcastle Knights in the NRL, the Huddersfield Giants in the Super League and the Ipswich Jets in the Queensland Cup. He represented both New Zealand and Samoa at international level.

== Background ==
Born in Auckland, New Zealand, Fa'alogo is of Samoan descent. He is the younger brother of the rugby league footballer; Sala Fa'alogo.

Fa'alogo played his junior football for the Mount Albert Lions in the Bartercard Cup, and Papatoetoe Panthers before being signed by the South Sydney Rabbitohs.

== Professional playing career ==
=== South Sydney Rabbitohs ===
In Round 10 of 2003 NRL season Fa'alogo made his NRL début for the Rabbitohs against the Cronulla-Sutherland Sharks. In 2006, Fa'alogo made his international début for New Zealand against Australia in the ANZAC Test. He played in 4 more games at the end of the season. In 2006, he won the George Piggins Medal as South Sydney's best and fairest player of the season.

Fa'alogo was selected to play for the New Zealand national team at lock forward in the 2007 ANZAC Test loss against Australia. In Round 25 of the 2007 NRL season, Fa'alogo was sin binned against the Sydney Roosters after punching Roosters player Braith Anasta, which resulted in a seven-week suspension from the NRL Judiciary.

In 2008, he was sent home from a club trip to Florida, United States, and fined $10,000 after punching a member of the public at a taxi rank.

Fa'alogo playing for New Zealand in 2008

Fa'alogo was again selected for the ANZAC Test again in 2008. In August 2008, Fa'alogo was named in the New Zealand training squad for the 2008 Rugby League World Cup, and in October 2008, he was named in the final 24-man Kiwi squad. Fa'alogo played in the New Zealand team that defeated Australia in the final of the 2008 World Cup to claim New Zealand's first title.

In September 2009, he punched coach Jason Taylor during end of season celebrations, knocking him to the ground. He was reportedly provoked by Taylor's 'rough horseplay' and had his contract terminated due to the incident.

=== Huddersfield Giants ===
In May 2009, Fa'alogo signed a four-year contract with Super League club Huddersfield Giants starting in 2010. In 2011, Fa'alogo was selected in the inaugural Exiles squad for the International Origin match against England at Headingley. He was again selected to play for the Exiles in 2012.

=== Newcastle Knights ===
On 3 October 2012, Fa'alogo signed a one-year contract with the Newcastle Knights starting in 2013.

On 22 May 2013, Fa'alogo re-signed with the Newcastle club on a one-year contract.

In October 2013, Fa'alogo was selected for Samoa in their 2013 Rugby League World Cup campaign. He featured in all four of the Samoans' games at the Tournament.

In May 2014, Fa'alogo captained Samoa in the 2014 Pacific Rugby League International. He led New Zealand to a 32–16 win and a place in the 2014 Four Nations.

On 8 September 2014, Fa'alogo was selected for the Samoa Four Nations train-on squad. On 7 October 2014, Fa'alogo was selected in the Samoa national rugby league team Final 24-man squad for the 2014 Four Nations series.

On 31 October 2014, Fa'alogo re-signed with the Knights on a 1-year contract.

On 8 August 2015, Fa'alogo announced his immediate retirement from rugby league due to a neck injury. He finished having played 198 games in the NRL. However, in 2016, he extended his career by joining the Ipswich Jets in the Queensland Cup.
