= Roy Asotasi =

New Zealand and Samoa international rugby league footballer

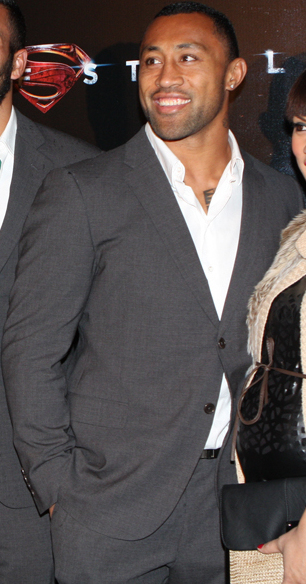

Personal information
- Born: 6 January 1982 (age 44) Auckland, New Zealand

Playing information
- Height: 181 cm (5 ft 11 in)
- Weight: 108 kg (17 st 0 lb)
- Position: Prop
Club
Years	Team	Pld	T	G	FG	P
2002–06	Canterbury Bulldogs	84	8	0	0	32
2007–13	South Sydney	133	12	0	0	48
2014–15	Warrington Wolves	58	5	1	0	22
	Total	275	25	1	0	102
Representative
Years	Team	Pld	T	G	FG	P
2004–09	New Zealand	24	0	0	0	0
2013	Samoa	1	0	0	0	0

Roy Asotasi (born 6 January 1982) is a former professional rugby league footballer who played as a prop in the 2000s and 2010s. A New Zealand international captain, he also played for Samoa. Asotasi played in the NRL for Australian clubs Canterbury-Bankstown (with whom he won the 2004 NRL Premiership) and the South Sydney Rabbitohs from 2007 to 2013. He then played in the Super League for the Warrington Wolves.

== Background ==
Asotasi was born in Auckland, New Zealand. He is of Samoan descent,

A product of the Marist Saints junior club in Auckland, he also attended Marcellin College, Auckland.

== Professional playing career ==
=== Canterbury-Bankstown ===
Asotasi joined Sydney NRL club, the Canterbury-Bankstown club in 2000 as a prop where he was a regular member of their Jersey Flegg Cup team, playing in the Premiership-winning team against Western Suburbs. In 2001 he was again a regular member of the Jersey Flegg Cup team and played in the Premiership-winning team against the Cronulla-Sutherland Sharks as a second-row.

By 2002 Asotasi became a regular member of the dogs of war' Premier League team and received the opportunity to join the highest grade of Rugby League in Australia, the NRL against Canberra, when Glen Hughes was injured. He returned to the Premier League to play in the Preliminary Final against Penrith Panthers but was injured and missed the Grand Final win.

In 2004, Asotasi started the season in the NRL premiership and played every game of the season including the 2004 NRL grand final victory over cross-town rivals, the Sydney Roosters. In that same year he was also selected to play for New Zealand. He has played 14 Tests for New Zealand from 2004 to 2006.

As 2004 NRL premiers, the Canterbury-Bankstown faced Super League IX champions, Leeds in the 2005 World Club Challenge. Asotasi played as a prop in the Bulldogs' 32–39 loss. In 2005, Asotasi played every match of the season before his sequence of 74 consecutive games was interrupted in 2006. He was injured just before the finals but returned to play in the Preliminary Final against Brisbane.

=== South Sydney ===
Asotasi with Jason Taylor

Foundation club, South Sydney Rabbitohs signed Roy Asotasi for the start of the 2007 NRL season. He was selected to captain the New Zealand national team as a prop in the 2007 ANZAC Test loss against Australia. With Souths he played a major part in helping the club to its first finals appearance in over two decades by finishing in seventh position. That year Asotasi was awarded the George Piggins Medal as the club's best and fairest player for the season. Asotasi was named the New Zealand national side captain, as of the 2008 Anzac Test Match. He was named in the New Zealand training squad for the 2008 Rugby League World Cup. However, in the round 25 clash against the Sydney Roosters, Asotasi picked up a pectoral injury and was sidelined for the remainder of the season and subsequently, took no part in New Zealand's Rugby League World Cup success. A pectoral injury also interrupted Asotasi's 2012 season.

In April 2013, Asotasi captained Samoa in their test match against fierce pacific rivals Tonga.

=== Warrington Wolves ===
On 2 July 2013, Roy signed a two-year contract to play for the English Super League club Warrington Wolves. His contract began in 2014.

On 20 August 2015, Tony Smith, coach of Warrington confirmed that he would be releasing Asotasi for the 2016 season as he wants space to sign one more player to the team next season. Asotasi finished his Warrington career with 58 appearances, 5 tries and one goal.

== Statistics ==
Year	Team	Games	Tries	Goals	Pts
2002	Canterbury-Bankstown Bulldogs	3			
2003	Canterbury-Bankstown Bulldogs	6	1		4
2004	Canterbury-Bankstown Bulldogs	28	4		16
2005	Canterbury-Bankstown Bulldogs	24	1		4
2006	Canterbury-Bankstown Bulldogs	23	2		8
2007	South Sydney Rabbitohs	25	4		16
2008	South Sydney Rabbitohs	23	3		12
2009	South Sydney Rabbitohs	20	1		4
2010	South Sydney Rabbitohs	20	1		4
2011	South Sydney Rabbitohs	8			
2012	South Sydney Rabbitohs	12	2		8
2013	South Sydney Rabbitohs	25	1		4
2014	Warrington Wolves	29	3		12
2015	Warrington Wolves	30	3	1	14
	Totals	275	25	1	102

== Highlights ==
- Junior Club: Marist Saints
- Career Stats: 218 career games to date scoring 15 tries
- Three Premierships with the Bulldogs, 2000 and 2001 (Jersey Flegg), 2004 (NRL)
- 3 May 2007: first game played in the famous red and green.
- Appointed captain of South Sydney
- Captain of New Zealand National Rugby League Team (the Kiwis)

Preceded by Ruben Wiki	New Zealand national rugby league team captain 2007–2008	Succeeded by Nathan Cayless
